= 1999 UCI Track Cycling World Cup Classics =

International track cycling competition

The 1999 UCI Track Cycling World Cup Classics is a multi race tournament over a season of track cycling. The season ran from 21 May 1999 to 6 September 1999. The World Cup is organised by the UCI.

== Overall nations standings ==
| Rank | Nation | Points |
|---|---|---|
| 1 | France | 384 |
| 2 | Germany | 293 |
| 3 | United States | 270 |
| 4 | Australia | 206 |
| 5 | Italy | 201 |
| 6 | Spain | 172 |
| 7 | Great Britain | 171 |
| 8 | Russia | 163 |
| 9 | New Zealand | 130 |
| 10 | Canada | 123 |

== Results ==
=== Men ===
| Event | Winner | Second | Third |
Mexico, Mexico City — May 21–23, 1999
| 1 km time trial | Hervé Thuet (FRA) | Jason Queally (GBR) | Matthew Sinton (NZL) |
| Keirin | Roberto Chiappa (ITA) | Marty Nothstein (USA) | Jan van Eijden (GER) |
| Sprint | Jan van Eijden (GER) | Darryn Hill (AUS) | Marty Nothstein (USA) |
| Team sprint | Great Britain; Craig MacLean; Jason Queally; Chris Hoy | Poland; Konrad Czajkowski; Grzegorz Krejner; Marcin Mientki | Spain; José Antonio Escuredo; Salvador Meliá; José Antonio Villanueva |
| Individual pursuit | Francis Moreau (FRA) | Robert Karsnicki (POL) | Franco Marvulli (SUI) |
| Team pursuit | France; Christophe Moreau; Philippe Ermenault; Damien Pommereau; Cyril Bos | New Zealand; Lee Maxwell Vertogen; Brendon Mark Cameron; Tim Carswell; Greg Henderson | Colombia; Luis Felipe Laverde; Víctor Herrera; Juan Alzate; Jhon García |
| Points race | Franco Marvulli (SUI) | James Carney (USA) | Alexei Garanine (RUS) |
| Madison | Spain; Joan Llaneras; Miguel Alzamora | Russia; Oleg Grichkine; Andrei Minachkine | New Zealand; Tim Carswell; Greg Henderson |
United States, Frisco — May 28–30, 1999
| 1 km time trial | Sören Lausberg (GER) | Shane Kelly (AUS) | Grzegorz Krejner (POL) |
| Keirin | Laurent Gané (FRA) | Roberto Chiappa (ITA) | Jan van Eijden (GER) |
| Sprint | Laurent Gané (FRA) | Marty Nothstein (USA) | Jan van Eijden (GER) |
| Team sprint | Poland; Marcin Mientki; Grzegorz Krejner; Konrad Czajkowski | Australia; Danny Day; Gary Neiwand; Shane Kelly | Germany; Jan van Eijden; René Wolff; Sören Lausberg |
| Individual pursuit | Christian Vande Velde (USA) | Mauro Trentini (ITA) | Luke Roberts (AUS) |
| Team pursuit | Australia; Nigel Grigg; Brett Lancaster; Luke Roberts; Graeme Brown | France; Cyril Bos; Philippe Ermenault; Francis Moreau; Damien Pommereau | United States; Tommy Mulkey; Mike Tillman; Adam Laurent; Christian Vande Velde |
| Points race | Brian Walton (CAN) | Luis Fernando Sepúlveda (CHI) | Franz Stocher (AUT) |
| Madison | Argentina; Juan Curuchet; Gabriel Curuchet | Spain; Isaac Gálvez; Miguel Alzamora | Austria; Roland Garber; Franz Stocher |
Spain, Valencia — June 18–20, 1999
| 1 km time trial | Jason Queally (GBR) | Stefan Nimke (GER) | Damien Gerard (FRA) |
| Keirin | Frédéric Magné (FRA) | Jens Fiedler (GER) | David Cabrero (ESP) |
| Sprint | Florian Rousseau (FRA) | Jens Fiedler (GER) | Roberto Chiappa (ITA) |
| Team sprint | Germany; Jens Fiedler; Eyk Pokorny; Stefan Nimke | France; Damien Gerard; Florian Rousseau; Frédéric Magné | Poland; Grzegorz Krejner; Bartlomiej Saczuk; Marcin Mientki |
| Individual pursuit | Robert Bartko (GER) | Sergiy Matveyev (UKR) | Mauro Trentini (ITA) |
| Team pursuit | Germany; Thorsten Rund; Christian Lademann; Daniel Becke; Guido Fulst | Ukraine; Alexandre Simonenko; Ruslan Pidgornyy; Sergiy Chernyavsky; Olexander Fedenko | Italy; Mario Benetton; Cristian Bianchini; Mauro Trentini; Cristiano Citton |
| Points race | Vasyl Yakovlev (UKR) | Kouji Yoshii (JPN) | Matthew Gilmore (BEL) |
| Madison | Argentina; Juan Curuchet; Gabriel Curuchet | Germany; Guido Fulst; Thorsten Rund | Denmark; Jimmi Madsen; Anders Kristensen |
Italy, Fiorenzuola d'Arda — August 27–29, 1999
| 1 km time trial | Sören Lausberg (GER) | Dimitris Georgalis (GRE) | Ihor Troyanovsky (UKR) |
| Keirin | Cancelled due to bad weather | | |
| Sprint | Roberto Chiappa (ITA) | Laurent Gané (FRA) | Ainārs Ķiksis (LAT) |
| Team sprint | Great Britain; Craig MacLean; Chris Hoy; Jason Queally | Spain; José Manuel Moreno; Diego Ortega; José Antonio Escuredo | Greece; Dimitris Georgalis; Labros Vassilopoulos; George Himonetos |
| Individual pursuit | Jens Lehmann (GER) | Alexei Markov (RUS) | Andrea Collinelli (ITA) |
| Team pursuit | Ukraine; Sergiy Chernyavsky; Olexander Fedenko; Sergiy Matveyev; Alexandre Simonenko | Italy; Andrea Collinelli; Mirko Crepaldi; Cristiano Citton; Marco Villa | Russia; Vladislav Borisov; Alexei Markov; Vladimir Karpets; Denis Smyslov |
| Points race | Silvio Martinello (ITA) | Cho Ho-Sung (KOR) | Jacob Piil (DEN) |
| Madison | Australia; Brett Aitken; Scott McGrory | Italy; Silvio Martinello; Marco Villa | Belgium; Etienne De Wilde; Matthew Gilmore |
Colombia, Cali — September 4–6, 1999
| 1 km time trial | Arnaud Tournant (FRA) | Garen Bloch (RSA) | Neil Campbell (GBR) |
| Keirin | Shinichi Ota (JPN) | José Antonio Escuredo (ESP) | Christian Marcelo Arrue (USA) |
| Sprint | Mickaël Bourgain (FRA) | Vincent Le Quellec (FRA) | Christian Marcelo Arrue (USA) |
| Team sprint | France; Arnaud Tournant; Mickaël Bourgain; Vincent Le Quellec | Slovakia; Jaroslav Jeřábek; Peter Bazálik; Jan Lepka | Great Britain; Craig MacLean; Neil Campbell; Craig Percival |
| Individual pursuit | Stefan Steinweg (GER) | Luke Roberts (AUS) | Mariano Friedick (USA) |
| Team pursuit | Australia; Luke Roberts; Brett Lancaster; Graeme Brown; Nigel Grigg | Denmark; Michael Sandstød; Jimmi Madsen; Jacob Nielsen; Jacob Piil | Spain; Carlos Torrent; Joan Llaneras; Nuria Florencio; Santos González |
| Points race | Juan Curuchet (ARG) | Zbigniew Wyrzykowski (POL) | Nigel Grigg (AUS) |
| Madison | Spain; Joan Llaneras; Miquel Alzamora | Argentina; Gabriel Curuchet; Juan Curuchet | Germany; Stefan Steinweg; Mario Vonhof |
Overall results
| 1 km time trial | Sören Lausberg (GER) | Tie: Grzegorz Krejner (POL) and Jason Queally (GBR) | |
| Keirin | Roberto Chiappa (ITA) | Marty Nothstein (USA) | Jan van Eijden (GER) |
| Sprint | Jan van Eijden (GER) | Roberto Chiappa (ITA) | Laurent Gané (FRA) |
| Team sprint | Great Britain | Tie: Spain and Poland | |
| Individual pursuit | Tie: Luke Roberts (AUS) and Mauro Trentini (ITA) | | Franco Marvulli (SUI) |
| Team pursuit | France | Spain | Australia |
| Points race | Tie: Cho Ho-Sung (KOR) and Zbigniew Wyrzykowski (POL) | | James Carney (USA) |
| Madison | Tie: Argentina and Spain | | Australia |

=== Women ===
| Event | Winner | Second | Third |
Mexico, Mexico City — May 21–23, 1999
| 500 m time trial | Tanya Dubnicoff (CAN) | Nancy Contreras (MEX) | Oksana Grishina (RUS) |
| Sprint | Tanya Dubnicoff (CAN) | Jennie Reed (USA) | Oksana Grishina (RUS) |
| Individual pursuit | Rasa Mažeikytė (LTU) | Yvonne McGregor (GBR) | Leontien Zijlaard-Van Moorsel (NED) |
| Points race | Mandy Poitras (CAN) | Antonella Bellutti (ITA) | Olga Slyusareva (RUS) |
United States, Frisco — May 28–30, 1999
| 500 m time trial | Félicia Ballanger (FRA) | Tanya Dubnicoff (CAN) | Jiang Cuihua (CHN) |
| Sprint | Félicia Ballanger (FRA) | Tanya Dubnicoff (CAN) | Wang Yan (CHN) |
| Individual pursuit | Erin Veenstra (USA) | Sarah Ulmer (NZL) | Natalia Karimova (RUS) |
| Points race | Olga Slyusareva (RUS) | Alayna Burns (AUS) | Anke Wichmann (GER) |
Spain, Valencia — June 18–20, 1999
| 500 m time trial | Félicia Ballanger (FRA) | Jiang Cuihua (CHN) | Nancy Contreras (MEX) |
| Sprint | Félicia Ballanger (FRA) | Jennie Reed (USA) | Magali Faure (FRA) |
| Individual pursuit | Rasa Mažeikytė (LTU) | Judith Arndt (GER) | Lucy Tyler-Sharman (AUS) |
| Points race | Belem Guerrero (MEX) | Judith Arndt (GER) | Antonella Bellutti (ITA) |
Italy, Fiorenzuola d'Arda — August 27–29, 1999
| 500 m time trial | Cancelled due to bad weather | | |
| Sprint | Félicia Ballanger (FRA) | Wang Yan (CHN) | Jiang Cuihua (CHN) |
| Individual pursuit | Leontien Zijlaard-Van Moorsel (NED) | Marion Clignet (FRA) | Elena Tchalych (RUS) |
| Points race | Elena Tchalych (RUS) | Antonella Bellutti (ITA) | Magali Faure (FRA) |
Colombia, Cali — September 4–6, 1999
| 500 m time trial | Tanya Dubnicoff (CAN) | Kathrin Freitag (GER) | Jiang Cuihua (CHN) |
| Sprint | Tanya Dubnicoff (CAN) | Michelle Ferris (AUS) | Tanya Lindenmuth (USA) |
| Individual pursuit | Marion Clignet (FRA) | Sarah Ulmer (NZL) | Natalia Karimova (RUS) |
| Points race | Marion Clignet (FRA) | Belem Guerrero (MEX) | Edita Kubelskienė (LTU) |
Overall results
| 500 m time trial | Tanya Dubnicoff (CAN) | Jiang Cuihua (CHN) | Félicia Ballanger (FRA) |
| Sprint | Félicia Ballanger (FRA) | Tanya Dubnicoff (CAN) | Wang Yan (CHN) |
| Individual pursuit | Rasa Mažeikytė (LTU) | Marion Clignet (FRA) | Sarah Ulmer (NZL) |
| Points race | Antonella Bellutti (ITA) | Belem Guerrero (MEX) | Olga Slyusareva (RUS) |
