= 2000 UCI Track Cycling World Cup Classics =

International track cycling competition

The 2000 UCI Track Cycling World Cup Classics is a multi race tournament over a season of track cycling. The season ran from 19 May 2000 to 13 August 2000. The World Cup is organised by the UCI.

== Results ==
=== Men ===
Event	Winner	Second	Third
Russia, Moscow — 19–21 May 2000
Keirin	Jan van Eijden (GER)	Pavel Buráň (CZE)	Ainārs Ķiksis (LAT)
1 km time trial	Hervé Robert Thuet (FRA)	José Antonio Escuredo (ESP)	Jason Queally (GBR)
Individual pursuit	Jens Lehmann (GER)	Francis Moreau (FRA)	Alexei Markov (RUS)
Team pursuit	Russia; Denis Smyslov; Vladimir Karpets; Edouard Gritsoun; Alexei Markov	Germany; Jens Lehmann; Christian Bach; Sébastian Siedler; Andreas Müller	France; Damien Pommereau; Cyril Bos; Philippe Ermenault; Francis Moreau
Sprint	Laurent Gané (FRA)	Roberto Chiappa (ITA)	Jan van Eijden (GER)
Points race	Lubor Tesař (CZE)	Franz Stocher (AUT)	Joan Llaneras (ESP)
Team sprint	Spain; Salvador Meliá; José Antonio Villanueva; José Antonio Escuredo	Great Britain; Chris Hoy; Jason Queally; Craig MacLean	Latvia; Ivo Lakučs; Ainārs Ķiksis; Viesturs Bērziņš
Madison	Denmark; Jacob Filipowicz; Jimmy Hansen	Austria; Franz Stocher; Roland Garber	Belgium; Matthew Gilmore; Frank Corvers
Colombia, Cali — 26–28 May 2000
Keirin	Ivan Vrba (CZE)	Darryn Hill (AUS)	Roberto Chiappa (ITA)
1 km time trial	Arnaud Duble (FRA)	Shane Kelly (AUS)	Garen Bloch (RSA)
Individual pursuit	Dylan Casey (USA)	Gary Anderson (NZL)	Robert Slippens (NED)
Team pursuit	New Zealand; Timothy Carswell; Gregory Henderson; Lee Vertongen; Gary Anderson	Germany; Graeme Brown; Brent Dawson; Ashley Hutchinson; Stephen Wooldridge	United States; Dylan Casey; Derek Bouchard-Hall; Erin Hartwell; Thomas Mulkey
Sprint	Marty Nothstein (USA)	Vincent le Quellec (FRA)	Florian Rousseau (FRA)
Points race	Marlon Pérez (COL)	Franz Stocher (AUT)	Glen Thompson (AUS)
Team sprint	Spain; Salvador Meliá; José Antonio Villanueva; José Antonio Escuredo	France; Arnaud Duble; Vincent le Quellec; Florian Rousseau	Greece; Dimitris Georgalis; George Himoneatos; Labros Vasilopoulus
Madison	Australia; Ashley Hutchinson; Graeme Brown	New Zealand; Timothy Carswell; Glen Thompson	Austria; Werner Riebenbauer; Franz Stocher
Mexico, Mexico — 16–18 June 2000
Keirin	Roberto Chiappa (ITA)	Eyk Pokorny (GER)	Jobie Dajka (AUS)
1 km time trial	Arnaud Tournant (FRA)	Ben Kersten (AUS)	Grzegorz Krejner (POL)
Individual pursuit	Stefan Steinweg (GER)	Andrea Collinelli (ITA)	Philippe Ermenault (FRA)
Team pursuit	Italy; Mario Benetton; Andrea Collinelli; Mauro Trentini; Ivan Quaranta	Netherlands; John Den Braber; Jens Mouris; Robert Slippens; Wilco Zuijderwijk	France; Franck Perque; Philippe Ermenault; Fabien Merciris; Julien Tejada
Sprint	Eyk Pokorny (GER)	Mickaël Bourgain (FRA)	Viesturs Bērziņš (LAT)
Points race	Matthew Gilmore (BEL)	Wilco Zuijderwijk (NED)	Adriano Baffi (ITA)
Team sprint	France; Arnaud Duble; Arnaud Tournant; Mickaël Bourgain	Germany; Carsten Bergemann; Matthias John; Eyk Pokorny	Latvia; Viesturs Bērziņš; Ainārs Ķiksis; Ivo Lakučs
Madison	Spain; Joan Llaneras; Isaac Gálvez	Italy; Adriano Baffi; Marco Villa	Switzerland; Kurt Betschart; Bruno Risi
Italy, Turin — 14–16 July 2001
Keirin	Ainārs Ķiksis (LAT)	José Antonio Villanueva (ESP)	Mickaël Bourgain (FRA)
1 km time trial	Stefan Nimke (GER)	Grzegorz Krejner (POL)	Andrei Vynokurov (UKR)
Individual pursuit	Sergiy Matveyev (UKR)	Mauro Trentini (ITA)	Robert Karsnicki (POL)
Team pursuit	Italy; Adler Capelli; Cristiano Citton; Andrea Collinelli; Mauro Trentini	Ukraine; Alexander Symonenko; Lioubamyr Polotayko; Olexandr Fedenko; Sergiy Matveyev	Great Britain; Bradley Wiggins; Paul Manning; Chris Newton; Bryan Steel
Sprint	Ainārs Ķiksis (LAT)	Matthias John (GER)	Viesturs Bērziņš (LAT)
Points race	Cho Ho-Sung (KOR)	Edouard Gritsoun (RUS)	Marlon Pérez (COL)
Team sprint	Poland; Grzegorz Krejner; Konrad Czajkowski; Marcin Mientki	Germany; Stefan Nimke; René Wolff; Matthias John	Great Britain; Neil Campbell; Chris Hoy; Jason Queally
Madison	Slovakia; Martin Liška; Jozef Žabka	Italy; Silvio Martinello; Marco Villa	Belgium; Matthew Gilmore; Etienne De Wilde
Malaysia, Ipoh — 11–13 August 2001
Keirin	Cancelled		
1 km time trial	Arnaud Duble (FRA)	Teun Mulder (NED)	Matthew Sinton (NZL)
Individual pursuit	Ondřej Sosenka (CZE)	Robert Karsnicki (POL)	Gary Anderson (NZL)
Team pursuit	New Zealand; Brendon Mark Cameron; Gregory Henderson; Lee Vertongen; Gary Anderson	Poland; Grzegorz Mrozinski; Robert Karsnicki; Sebastian Jezierski; Szymon Kurdynowsky	Iran; Amir Zargari; Moussa Arbati; Alireza Haghi; Abbas Saeidi Tanha
Sprint	Mickaël Bourgain (FRA)	Matthias John (GER)	Anthony Peden (NZL)
Points race	Glen Thompson (NZL)	Jukka Heinikainen (FIN)	Colby Pearce (USA)
Team sprint	France; Jérôme Hubschwelin; Mickaël Bourgain; Arnaud Duble	Japan; Arai Takahiro; Isezaki Akihiro; Sasaki Yuish	New Zealand; Timothy Carswell; Anthony Peden; Matthew Sinton
Madison	Cancelled		

=== Women ===
Event	Winner	Second	Third
Russia, Moscow — 19–21 May 2000
500 m time trial	Jiang Cuihua (CHN)	Félicia Ballanger (FRA)	Svetlana Grankovskaia (RUS)
Individual pursuit	Leontien Zijlaard-van Moorsel (NED)	Marion Clignet (FRA)	Elena Tchalykh (RUS)
Sprint	Svetlana Grankovskaia (RUS)	Félicia Ballanger (FRA)	Natalia Markovnichenko (BLR)
Points race	Elena Tchalykh (RUS)	Marion Clignet (FRA)	Antonella Bellutti (ITA)
Colombia, Cali — 26–28 May 2000
500 m time trial	Lyndelle Higginson (AUS)	Céline Nivert (FRA)	Nancy Contreras (MEX)
Individual pursuit	Sarah Ulmer (NZL)	Antonella Bellutti (ITA)	Alayna Burns (AUS)
Sprint	Lyndelle Higginson (AUS)	Tanya Lindenmuth (USA)	Lori-Ann Muenzer (CAN)
Points race	Alayna Burns (AUS)	Antonella Bellutti (ITA)	Mandy Poitras (CAN)
Mexico, Mexico — 16–18 June 2000
500 m time trial	Nancy Contreras (MEX)	Lyndelle Higginson (AUS)	Ulrike Weichelt (GER)
Individual pursuit	Antonella Bellutti (ITA)	Kathryn Watt (AUS)	Anouska van der Zee (NED)
Sprint	Lyndelle Higginson (AUS)	Tanya Lindenmuth (USA)	Jennie Reed (USA)
Points race	Anouska van der Zee (NED)	Belem Guerrero (MEX)	Megan Troxell (USA)
Italy, Turin — 14–16 July 2001
500 m time trial	Felicia Balanger (FRA)	Wang Yan (CHN)	Katrin Meinke (GER)
Individual pursuit	Marion Clignet (FRA)	Sarah Ulmer (NZL)	Olga Slioussareva (RUS)
Sprint	Felicia Balanger (FRA)	Oksana Grichina (RUS)	Natalia Markovinchenko (BLR)
Points race	Olga Slioussareva (RUS)	Antonella Bellutti (ITA)	Teodora Ruano Sanchon (ESP)
Malaysia, Ipoh — 11–13 August 2001
500 m time trial	Katrin Meinke (GER)	Céline Nivert (FRA)	Szilvia Szabolcsi (HUN)
Individual pursuit	Zhao Haijuan (CHN)	Frances Newstead (GBR)	Nadejda Vlassova (RUS)
Sprint	Katrin Meinke (GER)	Szilvia Szabolcsi (HUN)	Lu Yi Wen (TPE)
Points race	Frances Newstead (GBR)	Rochelle Gilmore (AUS)	Nadejda Vlassova (RUS)
