= 1995 UCI Track Cycling World Cup Classics =

International track cycling competition

The 1995 UCI Track Cycling World Cup Classics is a multi race tournament over a season of track cycling. The World Cup is organised by the UCI. The events were held in Athens (19–21 May), Cottbus (9–11 June), Adelaide (13–15 July), Tokyo (18–20 July), Manchester (25–27 August) and Quito (15–17 September).

== Results ==
=== Men ===
Event	Winner	Second	Third
Greece, Athens
1 km time trial	Hervé Thuet (FRA)	Gianluca Capitano (ITA)	Sören Lausberg (GER)
Sprint	Patrice Sulpice (FRA)	Federico Paris (ITA)	Marty Nothstein (USA)
Keirin	Patrice Sulpice (FRA)	Eyk Pokorny (GER)	José Antonio Escuredo (ESP)
Team sprint	France; Hervé Robert Thuet; Florian Rousseau; Patrice Sulpice	Russia; Serguei Bohanchev; Alexei Zinoviev; Alexandr Khromikh	Germany; Sören Lausberg; Michael Scheurer; Matthias Schulze
Individual pursuit	Graeme Obree (GBR)	Dietmar Müller (AUT)	Jan-bo Petersen (DEN)
Team pursuit	Germany	France	Denmark
Points race	Andreas Beikirch (GER)	Bruno Risi (SUI)	Jan-bo Petersen (DEN)
Madison	Belgium; Etienne De Wilde; Lorenzo Lapage	Switzerland; Bruno Risi; Kurt Betschart	Austria; Wolfgang Kotzmann; Roland Garber
Germany, Cottbus
1 km time trial	Grzegorz Krejner (POL)	Frederic Lancien (FRA)	José Antonio Escuredo (ESP)
Sprint			
Keirin			
Team sprint			
Individual pursuit	Eduard Gritschun (RUS)	Jens Lehmann (GER)	Philippe Ermenault (FRA)
Team pursuit			
Points race			
Madison	Germany; Andreas Beikirch; Uwe Messerschmidt	Austria; Wolfgang Kotzmann; Roland Garber	
Australia, Adelaide
1 km time trial	Florian Rousseau (FRA)	Yuichiro Kamiyama (JPN)	Danny Day (AUS)
Sprint	Darryn Hill (AUS)	Gary Neiwand (AUS)	Patrice Sulpice (FRA)
Keirin	Gary Neiwand (AUS)	Darryn Hill (AUS)	Emmanuel Raasch (GER)
Team sprint	France	Australia; Gary Neiwand; Darryn Hill; Danny Day	Japan
Individual pursuit	Graeme Obree (GBR)	Philippe Ermenault (FRA)	Haydn Bradbury (AUS)
Team pursuit	France	Australia; Brett Aitken; Tony Homan; Haydn Bradbury; James Cross	Germany
Points race	Franz Stocher (AUT)	Martijn Lust (NED)	Serge Barbara (FRA)
Madison	Franz Stocher, Werner Riebenbauer (AUT)	Gatefan Steinweg, Uwe Messerschmidt (GER)	Martijn Lust, Robert Slippens (NED)
Japan, Tokyo
1 km time trial	Benoit Vetu (FRA)	Grzegorz Krejner (POL)	Jens Glucklich (GER)
Sprint	Darryn Hill (AUS)	Florian Rousseau (FRA)	Tomohiro Kitagawa (JPN)
Keirin	Darryn Hill (AUS)	Gary Neiwand (AUS)	Emanuel Raasch (GER)
Team sprint	France		
Individual pursuit	Philippe Ermenault (FRA)	Graeme Obree (GBR)	Friedrich Berein (AUT)
Team pursuit	France	Germany	Poland
Points race	Brett Aitken (AUS)	Serge Barbara (FRA)	Stefan Steinweg (GER)
Madison	France; Serge Barbara; Cyril Bos	Germany; Uwe Messerschmidt; Stefan Steinweg	Australia; Brett Aitken; Anthony Homan
United Kingdom, Manchester
1 km time trial	Benoît Vetu (FRA)	José Antonio Escuredo (ESP)	(Germany)
Sprint	Marty Nothstein (USA)	Lars Brian Nielsen (DEN)	
Keirin	Frédéric Magné (FRA)	Marty Nothstein (USA)	Eric Schoefs (BEL)
Team sprint	Italy	Spain	France
Individual pursuit	Andrea Collinelli (ITA)	Graeme Obree (GBR)	
Team pursuit	Germany; Christian Lademann; Ronny Lauke; Thorsten Rund; Heiko Szonn		
Points race	Bruno Risi (SUI)		
Madison	Italy; S Martinello; M Villa	Germany; U Messerschmidt; A Beikirch	Switzerland; Bruno Risi; Kurt Betschart
Ecuador, Quito
1 km time trial	José Antonio Escuredo (ESP)		
Sprint			
Keirin			
Team sprint			
Individual pursuit			
Team pursuit	Germany	New Zealand; Julian Dean; Greg Henderson; Tim Carswell; Lee Vertongen	
Points race	Glenn McLeay (NZL)		
Madison			

=== Women ===
Event	Winner	Second	Third
Greece, Athens
500 m time trial	Félicia Ballanger (FRA)	Galina Enioukhina (RUS)	Antonella Bellutti (ITA)
Sprint	Oksana Grichina (RUS)	Félicia Ballanger (FRA)	Galina Enioukhina (RUS)
Individual pursuit	Catherine Marsal (FRA)	Antonella Bellutti (ITA)	Judith Arndt (GER)
Points race	Catherine Marsal (FRA)	Ingrid Haringa (NED)	Judith Arndt (GER)
Germany, Cottbus
500 m time trial	Félicia Ballanger (FRA)	Erika Salumäe (EST)	Oksana Grishina (RUS)
Sprint	Oksana Grixina (RUS)	Galina Enioukhina (RUS)	Erika Salumäe (EST)
Individual pursuit	Janie Eickhoff (USA)	Antonella Bellutti (ITA)	Rasa Mažeikytė (LTU)
Points race	Janie Eickhoff (USA)	Ina-Yoko Teutenberg (GER)	Maria Jongeling (NED)
Australia, Adelaide
500 m time trial	Félicia Ballanger (FRA)	Erika Salumäe (EST)	Michelle Ferris (AUS)
Sprint	Erika Salumäe (EST)	Félicia Ballanger (FRA)	Michelle Ferris (AUS)
Individual pursuit	Sarah Ulmer (NZL)	Karen Barrow (AUS)	Ina Teutenberg (GER)
Points race	Nathalie Lancien (FRA)	Félicia Ballanger (FRA)	Sarah Ulmer (NZL)
Japan, Tokyo
500 m time trial	Erika Salumäe (EST)	Chang Yubin (CHN)	Félicia Ballanger (FRA)
Sprint	Wang Yan (CHN)	Erika Salumäe (EST)	Félicia Ballanger (FRA)
Individual pursuit	Sarah Ulmer (NZL)	Ma Huizhen (CHN)	Karen Barrow (AUS)
Points race	Ina Teutenberg (GER)	Michelle Ferris (AUS)	Ludmilla Gorojanskaya (BLR)
United Kingdom, Manchester
500 m time trial	Félicia Ballanger (FRA)	Erika Salumäe (EST)	Annett Neumann (GER)
Sprint	Félicia Ballanger (FRA)	Tanya Dubnicoff (CAN)	Erika Salumäe (EST)
Individual pursuit	Antonella Bellutti (ITA)	Svetlana Samokhvalova (RUS)	Marion Clignet (FRA)
Points race	Svetlana Samokhvalova (RUS)	Nathalie Lancien-Even (FRA)	Ingrid Haringa (NED)
Ecuador, Quito
500 m time trial	Erika Salumäe (EST)	Oksana Grishina (RUS)	Rita Razmaitė (LTU)
Sprint	Erika Salumäe (EST)	Oksana Grishina (RUS)	Donna Wynd (NZL)
Individual pursuit	Sarah Ulmer (NZL)	Natalia Karimova (RUS)	Anke Wichmann (GER)
Points race	Jacqui Nelson (NZL)	Svetlana Samokhvalova (RUS)	Belem Guerrero (MEX)
