= Cycling at the 2000 Summer Olympics – Men's keirin =

Cycling at the Olympics

The men's keirin in cycling at the 2000 Summer Olympics was contested by 20 cyclists. A keirin race consisted of eight laps of the track, or 2 kilometres (1.2 mi).

== Medalists ==
| Gold | Silver | Bronze |
| Florian Rousseau (FRA) | Gary Neiwand (AUS) | Jens Fiedler (GER) |

== Results ==
=== First round ===
The 20 cyclists competed in three heats of six to seven riders each. The top two riders in each heat (six overall) advanced to the next round, while the other fourteen cyclists competed in the first repechage.

Heat 1
| Place | Name | Nation | Qualify |
|---|---|---|---|
| 1 | Jens Fiedler | Germany | Q |
| 2 | Gary Neiwand | Australia | Q |
| 3 | Shinishi Ota | Japan | |
| 4 | Lampros Vasilopoulos | Greece | |
| 5 | Jaroslav Jeřábek | Slovakia | |
| 6 | Christian Arrue | United States | |

Heat 2
| Place | Name | Nation | Qualify |
|---|---|---|---|
| 1 | Pavel Buráň | Czech Republic | Q |
| 2 | Roberto Chiappa | Italy | Q |
| 3 | Eom In-yeong | South Korea | |
| 4 | Chris Hoy | Great Britain | |
| 5 | Florian Rousseau | France | |
| 6 | Grzegorz Krejner | Poland | |
| | Anthony Peden | New Zealand | |

Heat 3
| Place | Name | Nation | Qualify |
|---|---|---|---|
| 1 | Jan van Eijden | Germany | Q |
| 2 | Frédéric Magné | France | Q |
| 3 | David Cabrero | Spain | |
| 4 | Marty Nothstein | United States | |
| 5 | Matt Sinton | New Zealand | |
| 6 | Yuichiro Kamiyama | Japan | |
| | Ainārs Ķiksis | Latvia | |

==== First repechage ====
The first round repechage consisted of three heats of four to five riders each. The top two cyclists in each of the heats rejoined the winners from the first round in advancing to the second round. The rest were eliminated from competition.

Heat 1
| Place | Name | Nation | Qualify |
|---|---|---|---|
| 1 | Ainārs Ķiksis | Latvia | Q |
| 2 | Shinishi Ota | Japan | Q |
| 3 | Grzegorz Krejner | Poland | |
| 4 | Matt Sinton | New Zealand | |
| | Chris Hoy | Great Britain | |

Heat 2
| Place | Name | Nation | Qualify |
|---|---|---|---|
| 1 | Marty Nothstein | United States | Q |
| 2 | Florian Rousseau | France | Q |
| 3 | Anthony Peden | New Zealand | |
| 4 | In-Young Eum | South Korea | |
| 5 | Christian Arrue | United States | |

Heat 3
| Place | Name | Nation | Qualify |
|---|---|---|---|
| 1 | David Cabrero | Spain | Q |
| 2 | Lampros Vasilopoulos | Greece | Q |
| 3 | Jaroslav Jeřábek | Slovakia | |
| 4 | Yuichiro Kamiyama | Japan | |

=== Second round ===
The second round consisted of two heats, with the twelve cyclists split into groups of six. The top three riders in each heat advanced to the final.

Heat 1
| Place | Name | Nation | Qualify |
|---|---|---|---|
| 1 | Jens Fiedler | Germany | Q |
| 2 | Jan van Eijden | Germany | Q |
| 3 | Florian Rousseau | France | Q |
| 4 | Roberto Chiappa | Italy | |
| | Lampros Vasilopoulos | Greece | |
| | Ainārs Ķiksis | Latvia | |

Heat 2
| Place | Name | Nation | Qualify |
|---|---|---|---|
| 1 | Marty Nothstein | United States | Q |
| 2 | Gary Neiwand | Australia | Q |
| 3 | Frédéric Magné | France | Q |
| 4 | David Cabrero | Spain | |
| 5 | Pavel Buráň | Czech Republic | |
| 6 | Shinishi Ota | Japan | |

=== Final ===
| Place | Name | |
|---|---|---|
| 1st place, gold medalist(s) | Florian Rousseau | France |
| 2nd place, silver medalist(s) | Gary Neiwand | Australia |
| 3rd place, bronze medalist(s) | Jens Fiedler | Germany |
| 4 | Jan van Eijden | Germany |
| 5 | Marty Nothstein | United States |
| 6 | Frédéric Magné | France |
