= Cycling at the 2000 Summer Olympics – Men's team sprint =

Cycling at the Olympics

The men's team sprint event in cycling at the 2000 Summer Olympics was contested by twelve teams. The races were held on Sunday, 17 September at the Dunc Gray Velodrome.

== Medalists ==
Gold	Silver	Bronze
France; Laurent Gane; Florian Rousseau; Arnaud Tournant	Great Britain; Chris Hoy; Craig MacLean; Jason Queally	Australia; Sean Eadie; Darryn Hill; Gary Neiwand

== Results ==
- Q denotes qualification by place in heat.
- q denotes qualification by overall place.
- REL denotes relegated- due to being passed
- DNS denotes did not start.
- DNF denotes did not finish.
- DQ denotes disqualification.

=== Qualifying round ===
The twelve teams of three riders raced the course without competition in the qualifying round. The top eight qualified for the first round, while the bottom four received final rankings based on their times in the qualifying round.

Rank	NOC	Riders	Time	Speed	Qualify
1	France	Laurent Gane, Florian Rousseau, Arnaud Tournant	44.425 s	60.777 km/h	q
2	Great Britain	Chris Hoy, Craig MacLean, Jason Queally	44.659 s	60.458 km/h	q
3	Australia	Sean Eadie, Darryn Hill, Gary Neiwand	44.719 s	60.377 km/h	q
4	Greece	Lampros Vasilopoulos, Dimitrios Georgalis, Kleanthis Barngas	45.207 s	59.725 km/h	q
5	Japan	Narihiro Inamura, Yuichiro Kamiyama, Tomohiro Nagatsuka	45.406 s	59.464 km/h	q
6	Latvia	Viesturs Bērziņš, Ainārs Ķiksis, Ivo Lakus	45.589 s	59.225 km/h	q
7	Slovakia	Peter Balazak, Jan Lepka, Jaroslav Jerebek	45.659 s	59.134 km/h	q
8	Germany	Jens Fiedler, Soeren Lausberg, Stefan Nimke	45.701 s	59.080 km/h	q
9	Spain	José Antonio Escuredo, Jose Villanueva, Salvador Meliá	45.799 s	58.953 km/h	
10	Poland	Konrad Czajkowski, Grzegorz Krejner, Marcin Mientki	46.186 s	58.459 km/h	
11	Czech Republic	Pavel Buráň, Martin Polak, Ivan Vrba	46.276 s	58.346 km/h	
12	United States	Christian Arrue, John Bairos, Jonas Carney	46.337 s	58.269 km/h	

=== First round ===
In the first round of match competition, teams raced head-to-head. The two fastest winners advanced to the finals, the other two winners competed for the bronze medal and fourth place, and losers received final rankings (fifth through eight places) based on their times in the round.

Heat	Place	NOC	Riders	Time	Speed	Qualify	Rank
1	1	Greece	Lampros Vasilopoulos, Dimitrios Georgalis, Kleanthis Bargkas	45.079 s	59.895 km/h	Q	4
1	2	Japan	Narihiro Inamura, Yuichiro Kamiyama, Tomohiro Nagatsuka	45.264 s	59.650 km/h		
2	1	Australia	Sean Eadie, Darryn Hill, Gary Neiwand	44.745 s	60.342 km/h	Q	3
2	2	Latvia	Viesturs Bērziņš, Ainārs Ķiksis, Ivo Lakus	46.625 s	58.033 km/h		
3	1	Great Britain	Chris Hoy, Craig MacLean, Jason Queally	44.571 s	60.651 km/h	Q	2
3	2	Slovakia	Peter Balazak, Jan Lepka, Jaroslav Jerebek	45.523 s	59.311 km/h		
4	1	France	Laurent Gane, Florian Rousseau, Arnaud Tournant	44.302 s	60.945 km/h	Q	1
4	2	Germany	Jens Fiedler, Soeren Lausberg, Stefan Nimke	45.537 s	59.292 km/h		

=== Medal round ===
Heat	Place	NOC	Riders	Time	Speed
Bronze; Medal	1	Australia	Sean Eadie, Darryn Hill, Gary Neiwand	45.161 s	59.786 km/h
Bronze; Medal	2	Greece	Lampros Vasilopoulos, Dimitrios Georgalis, Kleanthis Bargkas	45.332 s	59.561 km/h
Gold; Medal	1	France	Laurent Gane, Florian Rousseau, Arnaud Tournant	44.233 s	61.040 km/h
Gold; Medal	2	Great Britain	Chris Hoy, Craig MacLean, Jason Queally	44.680 s	60.430 km/h

=== Final classification ===
The final classification was

Place	NOC
1	France
2	Great Britain
3	Australia
4	Greece
5	Japan
6	Slovakia
7	Germany
8	Latvia
9	Spain
10	Poland
11	Czech Republic
12	United States
