= Mauro Trentini =

Italian cyclist

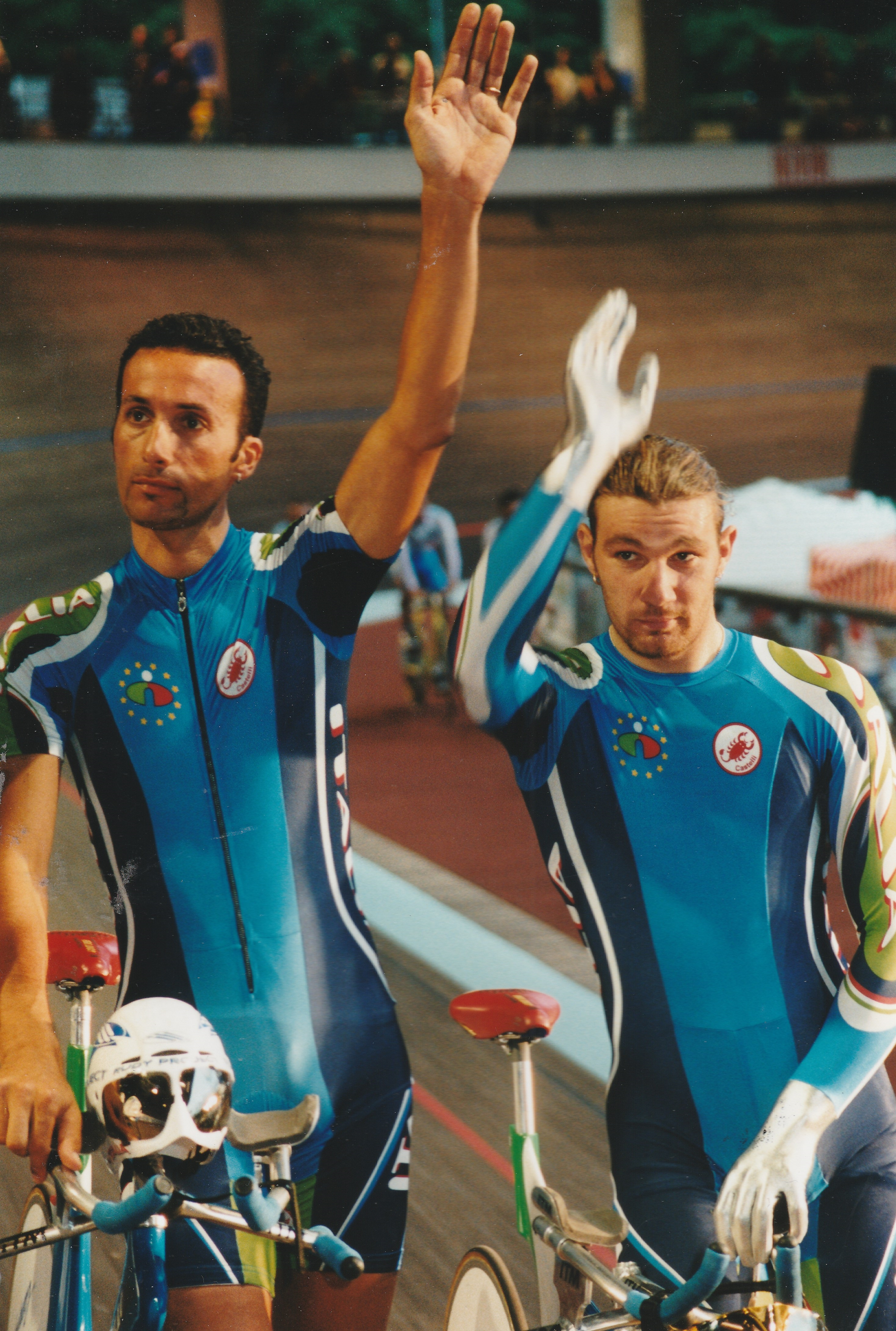
- Mauro Trentini (r.) with Andrea Colinelli

Personal information
- Full name: Mauro Trentini
- Born: 12 September 1975 (age 51) Trento, Italy

Cycling career
- Sport: Cycling
- Discipline: Track
- Role: Rider
Medal record
Men's track cycling
Representing Italy
World Championships
Gold medal – first place	1996 Manchester	Team pursuit
Bronze medal – third place	1999 Berlin	Individual pursuit

Mauro Trentini (born 12 September 1975 in Trento) is an Italian former track cyclist, specialising in the pursuit, where he was team pursuit world champion in 1996 and individual pursuit bronze medalist in 1999.

== Palmarès ==
Date	Placing	Event	Competition	Location	Country
31 August 1996	1st place, gold medalist(s)	Team pursuit (Note: The other riders on the squad were Adler Capelli, Cristiano Citton and Andrea Collinelli)	World Championships	Manchester	United Kingdom
28 May 1999	2	Individual pursuit	World Cup	Frisco	United States
18 June 1999	3	Individual pursuit	World Cup	Valencia	Spain
19 June 1999	3	Team pursuit (Note: The other riders on the squad were Mario Benetton, Cristian Bianchini and Cristiano Citton)	World Cup	Valencia	Spain
1999	1	Individual pursuit	World Cup	Overall (Note: Shared with Luke Roberts)	
22 October 1999	3rd place, bronze medalist(s)	Individual pursuit	World Championships	Berlin	Germany
17 June 2000	1	Team pursuit (Note: The other riders on the squad were Mario Benetton, Andrea Collinelli and Ivan Quaranta)	World Cup	Mexico City	Mexico
14 July 2000	2	Individual pursuit	World Cup	Turin	Italy
15 July 2000	1	Team pursuit (Note: The other riders on the squad were Adler Capelli, Cristiano Citton and Andrea Collinelli)	World Cup	Mexico City	Mexico
