= Cycling at the 2000 Summer Olympics – Men's track time trial =

Cycling at the Olympics

Men's track time trial at the Games of the XXVII Olympiad
- Track cycling pictogram
- Venue: Dunc Gray Velodrome
- Date: 16 September
- Competitors: 16 from 15 nations
- Winning time: 1:01.609 OR

Medalists
1st place, gold medalist(s)		Jason Queally; Great Britain
2nd place, silver medalist(s)		Stefan Nimke; Germany
3rd place, bronze medalist(s)		Shane Kelly; Australia

The men's track time trial in Cycling at the 2000 Summer Olympics was a time trial race in which each of the sixteen cyclists attempted to set the fastest time for four laps (1 kilometre) of the track. The race was held on Saturday, September 16 at the Dunc Gray Velodrome. For the first time since 1896, a nation had more than one cyclist: Germany had two. The event was won by Jason Queally of Great Britain, the nation's first victory in the men's track time trial (and first medal in the event since 1948). Stefan Nimke's silver was the first medal for Germany since 1936 (though the United Team of Germany, East Germany, and West Germany had each won medals). Shane Kelly, the 1992 silver medalist from Australia, became the fifth and last man to win multiple medals in the event with his bronze.

== Background ==
This was the 18th appearance of the event, which had previously been held in 1896 and every Games since 1928. For the first time, a women's track time trial event was held as well. Both the men's and women's versions would be cancelled after the 2004 Games, however.

The returning cyclists from 1996 were fourth-place finisher Soeren Lausberg of Germany, sixth-place finisher Grzegorz Krejner of Poland, seventh-place finisher Dimitrios Georgalis of Greece, and non-finisher Shane Kelly of Australia. Kelly had taken silver in 1992, won the world championship in 1995, and set the world record in 1995; he had been favored in 1996 but his foot slipped from his toe clip. Kelly won the world championship again in 1996 and 1997, coming in second to Arnaud Tournant of France in 1998 and 1999. Kelly and Tournant were the favorites in Sydney.

The Czech Republic made its debut in the men's track time trial, though Czechoslovakia has appeared before. France made its 18th appearance, the only nation to have competed at every appearance of the event.

== Competition format ==
The event was a time trial on the track, with each cyclist competing separately to attempt to achieve the fastest time. Each cyclist raced one kilometre from a standing start.

== Records ==
The following were the world and Olympic records prior to the competition.

World record	Arnaud Tournant (FRA)	1:00.148	Mexico City, Mexico	16 June 2000
Olympic record	Florian Rousseau (FRA)	1:02.712	Atlanta, United States	24 July 1996

Jason Queally broke the Olympic record with a time of 1:01.609. Stefan Nimke also beat the old Olympic record, but raced after Queally and did not beat his new mark.

== Schedule ==
All times are Australian Eastern Standard Time (UTC+10)

Date	Time	Round
Saturday, 16 September 2000	20:20	Final

== Results ==
Lausberg was the best of the first 12 cyclists. Queally went 13th, breaking the Olympic record and setting a time that nobody else would beat. Nimke rode after Queally, moving into second place. Kelly was 15th, recording a time that placed him third with only Tournant to go. The French cyclist, favored to win, had the best first-half but finished slowly and came in outside the medals with the fifth-best time.

Rank	Cyclist	Nation	250 m	500 m	750 m	Time	Notes
1st place, gold medalist(s)	Jason Queally	Great Britain	18.617	32.409	46.630	1:01.609	OR
2nd place, silver medalist(s)	Stefan Nimke	Germany	18.785	32.451	46.884	1:02.487	
3rd place, bronze medalist(s)	Shane Kelly	Australia	18.575	32.362	46.930	1:02.818	
4	Soeren Lausberg	Germany	19.114	32.954	47.321	1:02.937	
5	Arnaud Tournant	France	18.717	32.287	46.694	1:03.023	
6	Dimitrios Georgalis	Greece	18.546	32.664	47.747	1:04.018	
7	Grzegorz Krejner	Poland	19.160	33.257	48.127	1:04.156	
8	Garen Bloch	South Africa	19.088	33.335	48.338	1:04.478	
9	Narihito Inamura	Japan	19.256	33.574	48.673	1:05.085	
10	Julio César Herrera	Cuba	19.087	33.258	48.632	1:05.537	
11	Matt Sinton	New Zealand	19.348	33.837	49.106	1:05.706	
12	Jim Fisher	Canada	19.103	33.570	49.046	1:05.835	
13	Martin Polak	Czech Republic	19.420	33.731	49.091	1:05.851	
14	Jonas Carney	United States	19.007	33.618	49.187	1:05.968	
15	David Cabrero	Spain	19.498	34.236	50.212	1:07.710	
16	Gvido Miezis	Latvia	20.404	35.260	51.040	1:08.113	
