= Mario Benetton =

Italian cyclist

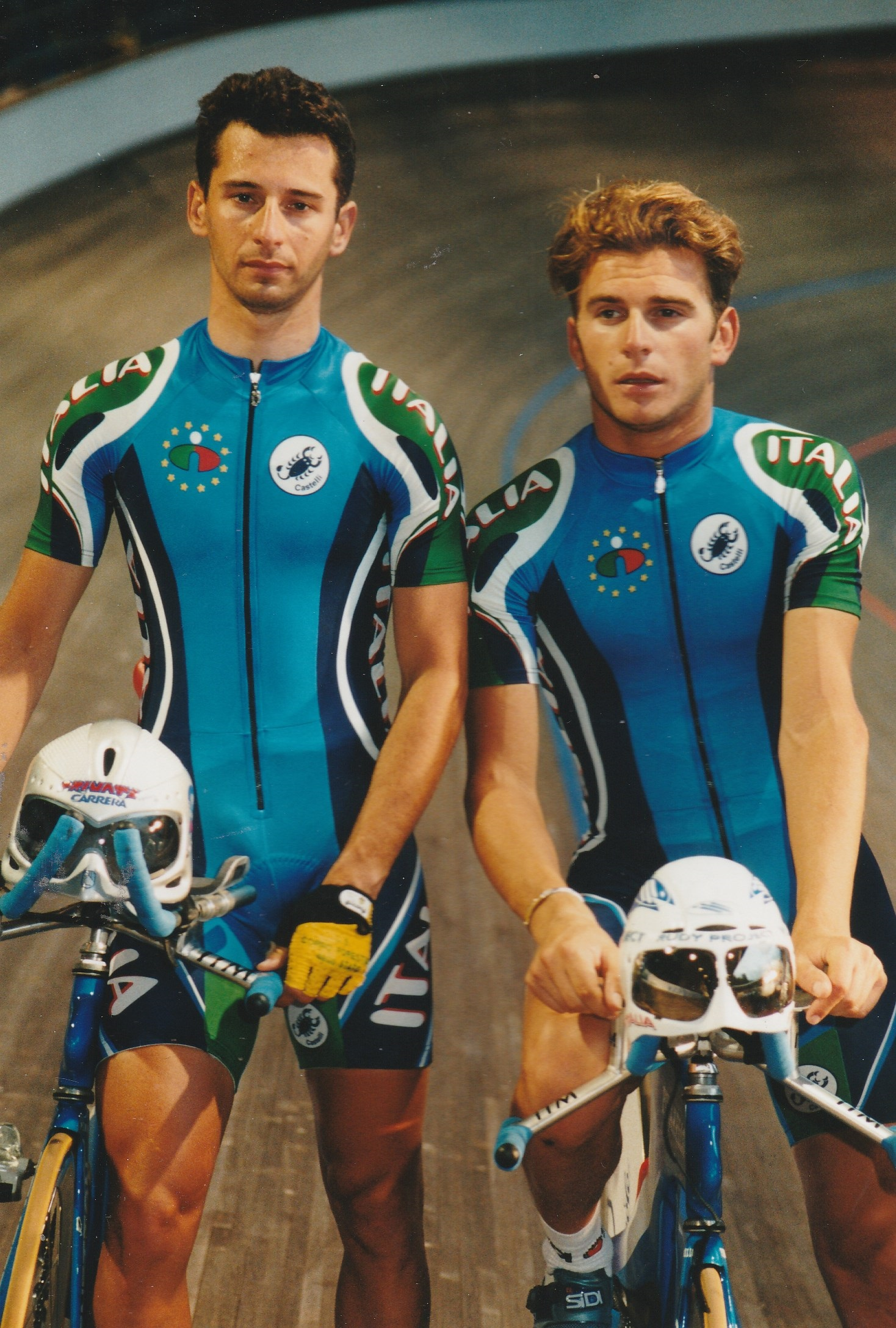
- Benetton (left) with Cristiano Citton

Personal information
- Born: 1 January 1974 (age 52) Padua, Italy

Cycling career
- Sport: Cycling
- Current team: Retired
- Disciplines: Track and road
- Role: Rider
Medal record
Men's track cycling
Representing Italy
World Championships
Gold medal – first place	1996 Manchester	Team pursuit
Gold medal – first place	1997 Perth	Team pursuit
Bronze medal – third place	1998 Bordeaux	Team pursuit

Mario Benetton (born 1 January 1974) is an Italian former track cyclist. He won the team pursuit, at the 1997 UCI Track Cycling World Championships. He also competed at the 2000 Summer Olympics.

== Major results ==
1997
1st Team pursuit, UCI World Track Championships
1st Stage 6 Paths of King Nikola
World Cup Classics

3rd Team pursuit, Quatro Sant'Elana

1998
3rd Team pursuit, UCI World Track Championships (with Andrea Collinelli, Adler Capelli & Cristiano Citton)
World Cup Classics

1st Team pursuit, Hyères

1999
World Cup Classics

3rd Team pursuit, Valencia

2000
World Cup Classics

1st Team pursuit, Mexico City
