= Six Days of Bassano del Grappa =

Six-day track cycling race

Race details
- Region: Bassano del Grappa, Italy
- Discipline: Track
- Type: Six-day racing

History
- First edition: 1986
- Editions: 10
- Final edition: 2013
- First winner: Roberto Amadio (ITA); Danny Clark (AUS); Francesco Moser (ITA)
- Most wins: Danny Clark (AUS) (3 wins)
- Final winner: Piergiacomo Marcolina (ITA); Franco Marvulli (SUI)

The Six Days of Bassano del Grappa was a six-day track cycling race held annually in Bassano del Grappa, Italy from 1986 to 1998. Two other editions took place in 2012 and 2013, but were only held over three days.

== Winners ==
Year	Winner	Second	Third
Six Days of Bassano del Grappa
1986	(Italy) Roberto Amadio (Australia) Danny Clark (Italy) Francesco Moser	(United Kingdom) Anthony Doyle (Italy) Silvio Martinello (Italy) Paolo Rosola	(Denmark) Gert Frank (Switzerland) Urs Freuler (Germany) Josef Kristen
1987	(Italy) Moreno Argentin (United Kingdom) Anthony Doyle (Liechtenstein) Roman Hermann	(Italy) Pierangelo Bincoletto (Australia) Danny Clark (Italy) Francesco Moser	(Italy) Adriano Baffi (Germany) Josef Kristen (Denmark) Hans-Henrik Ørsted
1988	(Australia) Danny Clark (Italy) Francesco Moser	(Italy) Adriano Baffi (United Kingdom) Anthony Doyle	(Italy) Silvio Martinello (Belgium) Stan Tourné
1989	(Italy) Adriano Baffi (Australia) Danny Clark	(Italy) Pierangelo Bincoletto (Belgium) Stan Tourné	(Italy) Stefano Allocchio (Italy) Silvio Martinello
1990	(West Germany) Volker Diehl (Italy) Silvio Martinello	(Soviet Union) Marat Ganeyev (Soviet Union) Konstantin Khrabtsov	(Italy) Mario Cipollini (Switzerland) Urs Freuler
1991–1995	No race
1996	(Italy) Silvio Martinello (Italy) Marco Villa	(Switzerland) Bruno Risi (Switzerland) Kurt Betschart	(Italy) Cristiano Citton (Italy) Andrea Collinelli
1997	(Italy) Cristiano Citton (Italy) Andrea Collinelli	(Italy) Silvio Martinello (Italy) Marco Villa	(Switzerland) Bruno Risi (Switzerland) Kurt Betschart
1998	(Italy) Marco Villa (Italy) Adriano Baffi	(Italy) Andrea Collinelli (Italy) Giovanni Lombardi	(Belgium) Etienne De Wilde (Belgium) Matthew Gilmore
Three Nights of Bassano del Grappa
2012	(Switzerland) Franco Marvulli (Italy) Elia Viviani	(Italy) Tomas Alberio (Italy) Kabir Lenzi	(Italy) Fabio Masotti (Argentina) Walter Pérez
2013	(Italy) Piergiacomo Marcolina (Switzerland) Franco Marvulli	(Germany) Marcel Barth (Germany) Nico Hesslich	(Czech Republic) Vojtěch Hačecký (Czech Republic) Marek Mixa
