= Cycling at the 2000 Summer Olympics – Men's points race =

Cycling event at the 2000 Olympics

Men's points race at the Games of the XXVII Olympiad
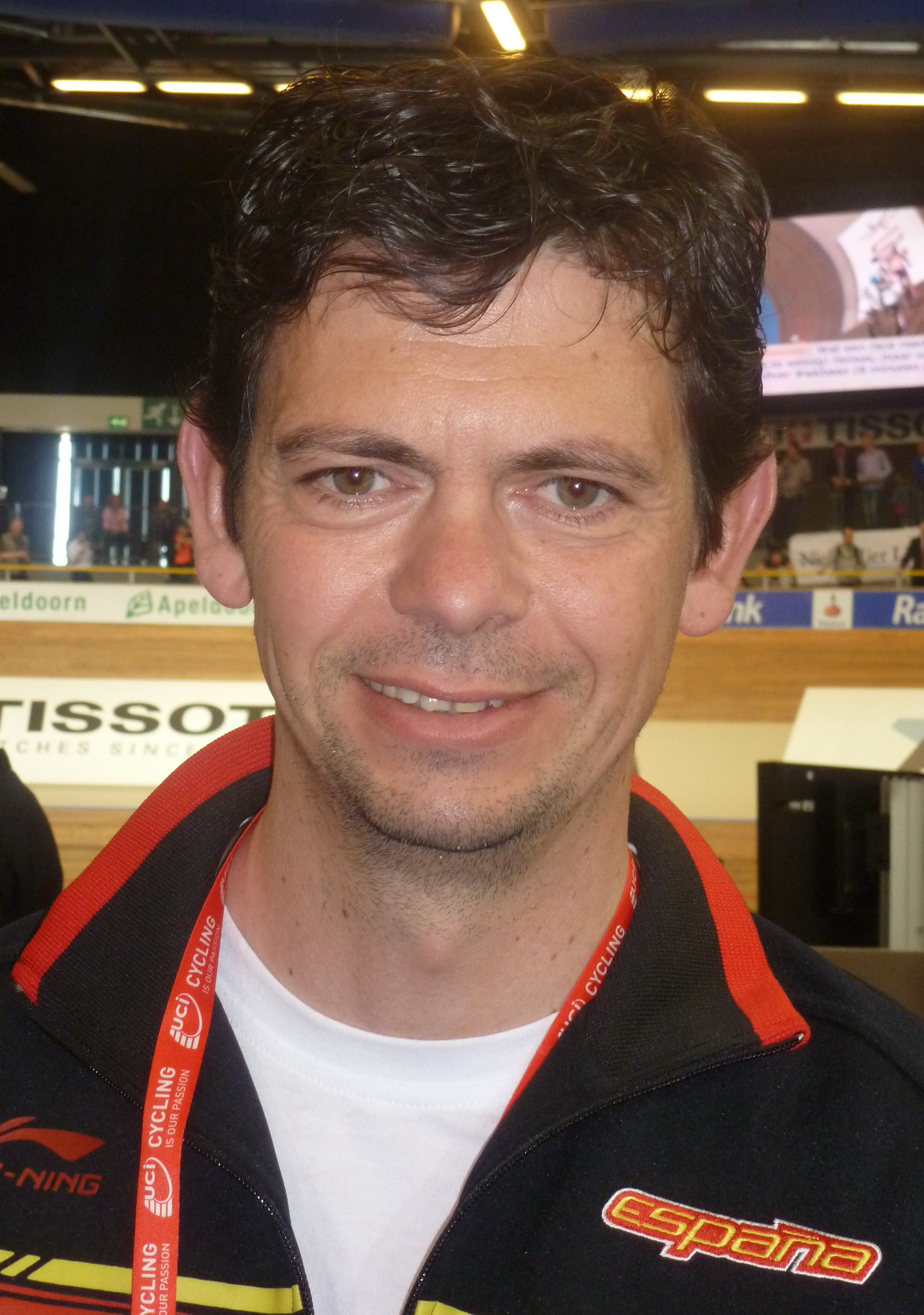
- Joan Llaneras (2011)
- Venue: Dunc Gray Velodrome
- Date: 20 September
- Competitors: 23 from 23 nations
- Winning score: 14 (0 laps behind)

Medalists
1st place, gold medalist(s)		Joan Llaneras; Spain
2nd place, silver medalist(s)		Milton Wynants; Uruguay
3rd place, bronze medalist(s)		Aleksei Markov; Russia

The men's points race was an event at the 2000 Summer Olympics in Sydney, Australia. There were 23 participants from 23 nations competing in the final, which was held on 20 September 2000. Each nation was limited to one cyclist in the event. The event was won by Joan Llaneras of Spain, the nation's first medal in the men's points race. Silver went to Milton Wynants of Uruguay and bronze to Aleksei Markov of Russia; those nations also earned their first medals in the event.

== Background ==
This was the sixth appearance of the event. It was first held in 1900 and not again until 1984; after that, it was held every Summer Games until 2008 when it was removed from the programme. The women's version was held from 1996 through 2008.

12 of the 28 cyclists from the 1996 Games, including all three medalists, returned: gold medalist Silvio Martinello of Italy, silver medalist Brian Walton of Canada, bronze medalist Stuart O'Grady of Australia, fourth-place finisher (and 1992 finalist) Vasyl Yakovlev of Ukraine, sixth-place finisher Joan Llaneras of Spain, seventh-place finisher Cho Ho-Sung of South Korea, tenth-place finisher Sergey Lavrenenko of Kazakhstan, eleventh-place finisher Milton Wynants of Uruguay, twelfth-place finisher Franz Stocher of Austria, seventeenth-place finisher Bruno Risi of Switzerland, twenty-third-place finisher Juan Curuchet of Argentina, and non-finisher Marlon Pérez of Colombia. Llaneras was the 1996 World Champion, with Martinello taking third. In 1997, those positions were reversed: Martinello won his third World Championship, with Llaneras in third. They flipped places again in 1998. Bruno Risi of Switzerland was the 1999 (reigning) World Champion, however.

Hong Kong made its debut at the event. France and Italy both competed for the sixth time, the only nations to have competed in all six Olympic men's points races.

== Competition format ==
With only 23 cyclists competing in 2000, only a final was held. The distance was 40 kilometres introduced in 1996, but the number of sprints was reduced from 20 to 16. Placement was determined first by how many laps behind the leader the cyclist was and second by how many sprint points the cyclist accumulated. That is, a cyclist with more sprint points but who was lapped once would be ranked behind a cyclist with fewer points but who had not been lapped. Sprint points could be gained only by cyclists who had not been lapped.

There were 16 sprints—one every 2.5 kilometres (10 laps). Points were awarded based on the position of the cyclists at the end of the sprint. Most of the sprints were worth 5 points for the leader, 3 to the second-place cyclist, 2 to third, and 1 to fourth. The final sprint was worth double: 10 points, 6, 4, and 2.

== Schedule ==
All times are Australian Eastern Standard Time (UTC+10)

Date	Time	Round
Wednesday, 20 September 2000	20:35	Final

== Results ==
Rank	Cyclist	Nation	Laps behind	Points
1st place, gold medalist(s)	Juan Llaneras	Spain	0	14
2nd place, silver medalist(s)	Milton Wynants	Uruguay	1	18
3rd place, bronze medalist(s)	Aleksei Markov	Russia	1	16
4	Cho Ho-Sung	South Korea	1	15
5	James Carney	United States	1	10
6	Franz Stocher	Austria	1	8
7	Glen Thomson	New Zealand	1	6
8	Silvio Martinello	Italy	1	5
9	Brian Walton	Canada	1	1
10	Stuart O'Grady	Australia	2	26
11	Wong Kam Po	Hong Kong	2	14
12	Bruno Risi	Switzerland	2	13
13	Jon Clay	Great Britain	2	10
14	Juan Curuchet	Argentina	2	8
15	Matthew Gilmore	Belgium	2	6
16	Makoto Iijima	Japan	2	6
17	Vasyl Yakovlev	Ukraine	2	5
18	Wilco Zuijderwijk	Netherlands	2	3
19	Christophe Capelle	France	2	2
20	Sergey Lavrenenko	Kazakhstan	2	1
21	Marlon Pérez	Colombia	2	0
22	Jimmi Madsen	Denmark	2	0
23	Thorsten Rund	Germany	2	0
