= Van Eijden =

van Eijden is a Dutch surname. Notable people with the surname include:

- Rens van Eijden (born 1988), Dutch footballer
- Remco van Eijden (born 1977), Dutch darts player
- Jan van Eijden (born 1976), German track cyclist
