= Frances Newstead =

English cyclist

Personal information
- Full name: Frances Newstead
- Born: 7 May 1973 (age 53) England; United Kingdom
- Height: 1.75 m (5 ft 9 in)
- Weight: 62 kg (137 lb)

Cycling career
- Sport: Cycling
- Disciplines: Road and track
- Role: Rider and Coach
- Rider type: Endurance

Amateur teams
- 1998: Holme Valley Wheelers
- 1999-2001: AC Slumberland
- 2002-2003: GS Strada
- 2004: AC Slumberland

Major wins
- (United Kingdom) British Champion

Frances Newstead (born 7 May 1973) is an English road and track cyclist from Holmfirth, West Yorkshire.

== Biography ==
Newstead took up cycling at Huddersfield University, where she studied sports science, commuting by bike before joining the university mountain bike club. She was spotted by coach Val Rushworth at Manchester velodrome while a riding the track league. She rode World Cup events in 2003 and 2004, and the 2002 UCI road world championships.

Newstead competed in the road race and time trial at the 2002 Commonwealth Games in Manchester, finishing eighth in both.

She has worked alongside Chris Boardman, she is also a coach and worked with British Cycling's Talent Team in 2005, 2006, 2007 and 2008.

Newstead has also been working with British Cycling's Paralympic team. In 2007, she helped Melaine Easter win the silver medal at the Pan American Championships, as tandem pilot in the road race. Frances now has 7 kids and is living a happy life. She is married and no longer cycles, although she coaches.

== Palmarès ==
2000
1st (United Kingdom) British National Circuit Race Championships
1st (United Kingdom) Points race, British National Track Championships
3rd Pursuit, British National Track Championships
1st Points race, Round 5, Ipoh, 2000 Track World Cup
2nd Pursuit, Round 5, Ipoh, 2000 Track World Cup
2nd CTT Time Trial Championships, 10 Miles

2002
1st (United Kingdom) British National Time Trial Championships
2nd CTT Time Trial Championships, 25 Miles
3rd Ster Zeeuwsche Eilanden

2nd Stage 3

7th Points race, Commonwealth Games
8th Road race, Commonwealth Games
8th Time trial, Commonwealth Games
12th Holland Ladies Tour

2003
2nd Pursuit, British National Track Championships
1st CTT Time Trial Championships, 25 Miles

2004
9th Profronde van Oostvoorne
10th Sparkassen Giro Bochum (UCI 1.9.2)

5th Climbs classification

2005
2nd Pursuit, British National Track Championships
