= Jim Fisher (cyclist) =

Canadian cyclist

Personal information
- Born: 17 June 1975 (age 51) Winnipeg, Canada

Cycling career
- Sport: Cycling

Jim Fisher (born 17 June 1975) is a Canadian cyclist. He competed in the men's track time trial at the 2000 Summer Olympics.

Fisher was inducted into the Manitoba Sports Hall of Fame in 2008.
