= 1997 UCI Track Cycling World Championships =

Cycling world championships

- Venue: Perth, Western Australia
- Date: 27–31 August 1997
- Velodrome: Perth SpeedDome
- Events: 12

The 1997 UCI Track Cycling World Championships were the World Championship for track cycling. They took place in Perth, Western Australia from 27 to 31 August 1997. Twelve events were contested, eight for the men and four for the women. France dominated most of the events, taking home half of the gold medals on offer.

== Medal table ==
Rank	Nation	Gold	Silver	Bronze	Total
1	France (FRA)	6	0	2	8
2	Italy (ITA)	2	1	1	4
3	Germany (GER)	1	3	1	5
4	Australia (AUS)	1	2	2	5
5	Russia (RUS)	1	2	1	4
6	Spain (ESP)	1	1	1	3
7	South Africa (RSA)	0	1	0	1
7	Switzerland (SUI)	0	1	0	1
7	Ukraine (UKR)	0	1	0	1
10	Argentina (ARG)	0	0	1	1
10	Great Britain (GBR)	0	0	1	1
10	Mexico (MEX)	0	0	1	1
10	United States (USA)	0	0	1	1
Totals (13 entries)		12	12	12	36

== Medal summary ==
Event	Gold		Silver		Bronze	
Men's Events
Men's sprint	Florian Rousseau; France		Jens Fiedler; Germany		Darryn Hill; Australia	
Men's 1 km time trial	Shane Kelly; Australia	1:03.156	Sören Lausberg; Germany	1:03.397	Stefan Nimke; Germany	1:03.470
Men's individual pursuit	Philippe Ermenault; France	4:23.058	Alexei Markov; Russia	4:27.350	Andrea Collinelli; Italy	4:27.511
Men's team pursuit	Andrea Capelli; Cristiano Citton; Andrea Collinelli; Mario Benetton; Italy	4:10.225	Oleksandr Klymenko; Olexandr Fedenko; Sergiy Matveyev; Alexander Symonenko; Ukraine	crashed	Carlos Da Cruz; Philippe Ermenault; Jérôme Neuville; Franck Perque; France	?
Men's team sprint	Vincent Le Quellec; Florian Rousseau; Arnaud Tournant; France	44.926	Sören Lausberg; Eyk Pokorny; Jan van Eijden; Germany	46.257	Danny Day; Sean Eadie; Shane Kelly; Australia	46.268
Men's keirin	Frédéric Magné; France		Jean-Pierre van Zyl; South Africa		Marty Nothstein; United States	
Men's points race	Silvio Martinello; Italy	37	Bruno Risi; Switzerland	16	Juan Llaneras; Spain	15
Men's madison	Miguel Alzamora; Juan Llaneras; Spain	19	Silvio Martinello; Marco Villa; Italy	13	Gabriel Curuchet; Juan Curuchet; Argentina	11
Women's Events
Women's sprint	Félicia Ballanger; France		Michelle Ferris; Australia		Oksana Grichina; Russia	
Women's 500 m time trial	Félicia Ballanger; France	34.681	Michelle Ferris; Australia	35.719	Magali Faure; France	35.898
Women's individual pursuit	Judith Arndt; Germany	3:38.730	Natalia Karimova; Russia	3:40.090	Yvonne McGregor; Great Britain	
Women's points race	Natalia Karimova; Russia	29	Teodora Ruano; Spain	29	Belem Guerrero; Mexico	19
