= Eom In-yeong =

South Korean cyclist

Personal information
- Born: 29 May 1971 (age 55)

Cycling career
- Sport: Cycling

Eom In-yeong (born 29 May 1971) is a South Korean cyclist. He competed in the men's keirin at the 2000 Summer Olympics.
