= 1998 UCI Track Cycling World Championships =

Cycling world championships

- Venue: Bordeaux, France
- Date: August 26–30, 1998
- Velodrome: Vélodrome de Bordeaux
- Nations participating: 32
- Events: 12

The 1998 UCI Track Cycling World Championships were the World Championship for track cycling. They took place in Bordeaux, France from August 26 to August 30, 1998. Twelve events were contested, eight for the men and four for the women. France dominated most of the events, taking home half of the gold medals on offer.

== Medal table ==
Rank	Nation	Gold	Silver	Bronze	Total
1	France (FRA)	6	1	2	9
2	Spain (ESP)	2	0	0	2
3	Germany (GER)	1	3	4	8
4	Australia (AUS)	1	3	1	5
5	Belgium (BEL)	1	0	0	1
5	Ukraine (UKR)	1	0	0	1
7	Italy (ITA)	0	1	2	3
8	Canada (CAN)	0	1	1	2
9	Latvia (LAT)	0	1	0	1
9	Mexico (MEX)	0	1	0	1
9	Netherlands (NED)	0	1	0	1
12	Russia (RUS)	0	0	1	1
12	United States (USA)	0	0	1	1
Totals (13 entries)		12	12	12	36

== Medal summary ==
Event	Gold		Silver		Bronze	
Men's Events
Men's sprint	Florian Rousseau; France		Jens Fiedler; Germany		Laurent Gané; France	
Men's 1 km time trial	Arnaud Tournant; France	1:01.879	Shane Kelly; Australia	1:02.261	Erin Hartwell; United States	1:02.637
Men's individual pursuit	Philippe Ermenault; France	4:20.627	Francis Moreau; France	4:21.466	Robert Bartko; Germany	4:26.890
Men's team pursuit	Alexander Symonenko; Sergiy Matveyev; Oleksandr Fedenko; Oleksandr Klymenko; Ukraine	4:02.895	Christian Lademann; Daniel Becke; Robert Bartko; Guido Fulst; Germany	4:08.160	Andrea Collinelli; Adler Capelli; Cristiano Citton; Mario Benetton; Italy	
Men's team sprint	Vincent Le Quellec; Florian Rousseau; Arnaud Tournant; France	44.338	Danny Day; Shane Kelly; Graham Sharman; Australia	45.464	Sören Lausberg; Stefan Nimke; Eyk Pokorny; Germany	45.210
Men's keirin	Jens Fiedler; Germany		Ainārs Ķiksis; Latvia		Laurent Gané; France	
Men's points race	Joan Llaneras; Spain		Andreas Kappes; Germany		Silvio Martinello; Italy	
Men's madison	Etienne De Wilde; Matthew Gilmore; Belgium		Silvio Martinello; Andrea Collinelli; Italy		Andreas Kappes; Stefan Steinweg; Germany	
Women's Events
Women's sprint	Félicia Ballanger; France		Michelle Ferris; Australia		Tanya Dubnicoff; Canada	
Women's 500 m time trial	Félicia Ballanger; France	34.010; W.R.	Tanya Dubnicoff; Canada	35.415	Michelle Ferris; Australia	35.451
Women's individual pursuit	Lucy Tyler-Sharman; Australia	3:35.255	Leontien Zijlaard-Van Moorsel; Netherlands	3:27.291	Judith Arndt; Germany	3:35.676
Women's points race	Teodora Ruano; Spain		Belem Guerrero; Mexico		Olga Slioussareva; Russia	
