= Gvido Miezis =

Latvian cyclist

Personal information
- Born: 9 September 1980 (age 46) Ventspils, Latvia
- Height: 176 cm (5 ft 9 in)
- Weight: 85 kg (187 lb)

Cycling career
- Sport: Cycling

Gvido Miezis (born 9 September 1980) is a Latvian cyclist. He competed in the men's track time trial at the 2000 Summer Olympics.
