= Cristiano Citton =

Italian cyclist

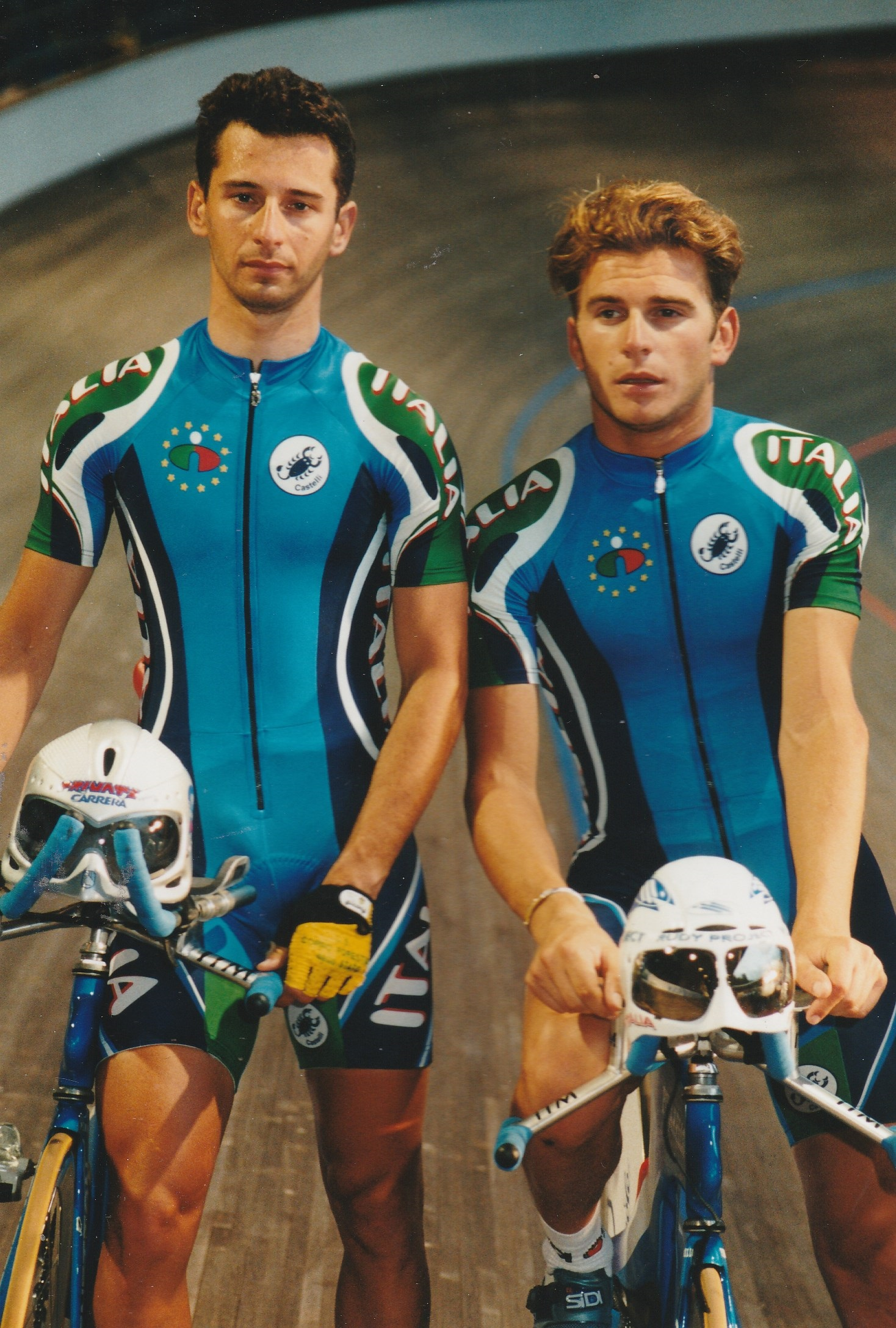
- Citton (right) with Mario Benetton

Personal information
- Born: 25 October 1974 (age 51) Romano d'Ezzelino, Italy
- Height: 1.80 m (5 ft 11 in)
- Weight: 75 kg (165 lb)

Cycling career
- Sport: Cycling
- Current team: Retired
- Disciplines: Track and road
- Role: Rider
Medal record
Men's track cycling
Representing Italy
World Championships
Gold medal – first place	1996 Manchester	Team pursuit
Gold medal – first place	1997 Perth	Team pursuit
Bronze medal – third place	1998 Bordeaux	Team pursuit

Cristiano Citton (born 25 October 1974) is an Italian former track cyclist. He is a two-time world team pursuit champion, winning the event in 1996 and 1997. He also competed at the 1996 and 2000 Summer Olympics.

== Major results ==
1996
1st Team pursuit, World Track Championships
1997
1st Team pursuit, World Track Championships
1st Six Days of Bassano del Grappa (with Andrea Colinelli)
1998
3rd Team pursuit, World Track Championships
World Cup Classics

1st Team pursuit, Hyères

1999
World Cup Classics

2nd Team pursuit, Fiorenzuola d'Arda
3rd Team pursuit, Valencia

2000
World Cup Classics

1st Team pursuit, Turin

=== Road ===
1996
1st Overall Olympia's Tour

1st Stage 2a

1997
1st Gran Premio della Liberazione
3rd Overall Olympia's Tour

1st Stage 3b
