= Lyndelle Higginson =

Australian track cyclist

Personal information
- Born: 5 November 1978 (age 47) Albury, New South Wales, Australia
- Height: 178 cm (5 ft 10 in)

Sport
- Country: Australia
- Sport: Track cycling
- Club: Brunswick Cycling Club

Lyndelle Higginson (born 5 November 1978 in Albury, New South Wales) is an Australian track cyclist.

Higginson competed in the women's track sprint at the 1998 Commonwealth Games in Kuala Lumpur, finishing in fourth place. She also competed in the women's track points race but failed to finish.

Higginson competed in Women's track time trial at the 2000 Summer Olympics and finished in 14th of 17.
