= Garen Bloch =

South African cyclist (1978–2018)

Personal information
- Born: 6 September 1978 Johannesburg, South Africa
- Died: 21 July 2018 (aged 39)

Cycling career
- Sport: Cycling
- Discipline: Track
- Role: Rider

Garen Bloch (6 September 1978 – 21 July 2018) was a South African Olympic cyclist.

Bloch was born in Johannesburg, South Africa. He is the younger brother of Olympian cyclist Sean Bloch of South Africa. He won 16 South African national titles, and set four national records. From 1994 to 1996, he was Maccabi Sportsman of the Year. He came in third at the 1997 World Cup in the points race, and second in the 1999 UCI Track Cycling World Cup Classics.

Bloch competed for Team South Africa in the 2000 Summer Olympics at the age of 22 in Sydney in Cycling; Men's 1,000 metres Time Trial, and finished in 8th with a time of 1:04.478.

On 21 July 2018, Bloch was killed in a motorbike accident in Johannesburg.
