= 1996 UCI Track Cycling World Championships =

Cycling world championships

- Venue: Manchester, United Kingdom
- Date: August 28–September 1, 1996
- Velodrome: Manchester Velodrome
- Events: 12

The 1996 UCI Track Cycling World Championships were the World Championship for track cycling. They took place in Manchester, United Kingdom from August 28 to September 1, 1996. Twelve events were contested, eight for the men and four for the women.

For the first time, the UCI Road World Championships was not organized in the same country as the Track Cycling World championships. In 1996, it took place in Lugano, Switzerland.

== Medal table ==
Rank	Nation	Gold	Silver	Bronze	Total
1	France (FRA)	4	1	4	9
2	Australia (AUS)	2	3	2	7
3	Italy (ITA)	2	1	2	5
4	United States (USA)	1	2	0	3
5	Russia (RUS)	1	0	1	2
6	Great Britain (GBR)	1	0	0	1
6	Spain (ESP)	1	0	0	1
8	Germany (GER)	0	4	3	7
9	Denmark (DEN)	0	1	0	1
Totals (9 entries)		12	12	12	36

== Medal summary ==
Event	Gold		Silver		Bronze	
Men's Events
Men's sprint	Florian Rousseau; France		Marty Nothstein; United States		Darryn Hill; Australia	
Men's 1 km time trial	Shane Kelly; Australia	1:02.777	Sören Lausberg; Germany	1:02.795	Jan van Eijden; Germany	1:04.541
Men's individual pursuit	Chris Boardman; Great Britain	4:11.114 WR	Andrea Collinelli; Italy	4:20.341	Francis Moreau; France	?
Men's team pursuit	Andrea Capelli; Cristiano Citton; Andrea Collinelli; Mauro Trentini; Italy	4:02.752	Cyril Bos; Philippe Ermenault; Jean-Michel Monin; Francis Moreau; France	4:04.539	Guido Fulst; Danilo Hondo; Thorsten Rund; Heiko Szonn; Germany	4:05.463
Men's team sprint	Darryn Hill; Gary Neiwand; Shane Kelly; Australia	44.804	Sören Lausberg; Jens Fiedler; Michael Hübner; Germany	45.455	Laurent Gané; Florian Rousseau; Herve Thuet; France	45.810
Men's keirin	Marty Nothstein; United States	10.982	Gary Neiwand; Australia		Frédéric Magné; France	
Men's points race	Joan Llaneras; Spain	29	Michael Sandstød; Denmark	29	Silvio Martinello; Italy	45 (-1 lap)
Men's madison	Silvio Martinello; Marco Villa; Italy	34	Scott McGrory; Stephen Pate; Australia	25	Andreas Kappes; Carsten Wolf; Germany	23
Women's Events
Women's sprint	Félicia Ballanger; France	11.959	Annett Neumann; Germany	12.225	Magali Humbert-Faure; France	12.112
Women's 500 m time trial	Félicia Ballanger; France	34.829	Annett Neumann; Germany	35.202	Michelle Ferris; Australia	35.694
Women's individual pursuit	Marion Clignet; France	3:31.023	Lucy Tyler-Sharman; Australia	3:36.411	Antonella Bellutti; Italy	?
Women's points race	Svetlana Samokhvalova; Russia	28	Janie Eickhoff; United States	18	Goulnara Fatkoulina; Russia	16
