= Robert Karśnicki =

Polish cyclist

Personal information
- Born: 20 May 1972 (age 54) Łódź, Poland

Cycling career
- Sport: Cycling

Robert Karśnicki (born 20 May 1972) is a Polish former cyclist. He competed at the 1992 Summer Olympics and the 1996 Summer Olympics.
