= Adler Capelli =

Italian track cyclist

Personal information
- Born: 8 November 1973 (age 52) San Pietro in Casale, Italy

Cycling career
- Sport: Cycling
- Current team: Retired
- Discipline: Track
- Role: Rider
Medal record
Men's track cycling
Representing Italy
World Championships
Gold medal – first place	1996 Manchester	Team pursuit
Gold medal – first place	1997 Perth	Team pursuit
Bronze medal – third place	1998 Bordeaux	Team pursuit

Adler Capelli (born 8 November 1973) is an Italian former track cyclist. He competed at the 1992, 1996 and the 2000 Summer Olympics.

== Major results ==
1996
1st Team pursuit, World Track Championships
1997
1st Team pursuit, World Track Championships
World Cup Classics

2nd Team pursuit, Quatro Sant'Elana

1998
3rd Team pursuit, World Track Championships
World Cup Classics

1st Team pursuit, Hyères

2000
World Cup Classics

1st Team pursuit, Turin
