= Kurt Betschart =

Swiss cyclist

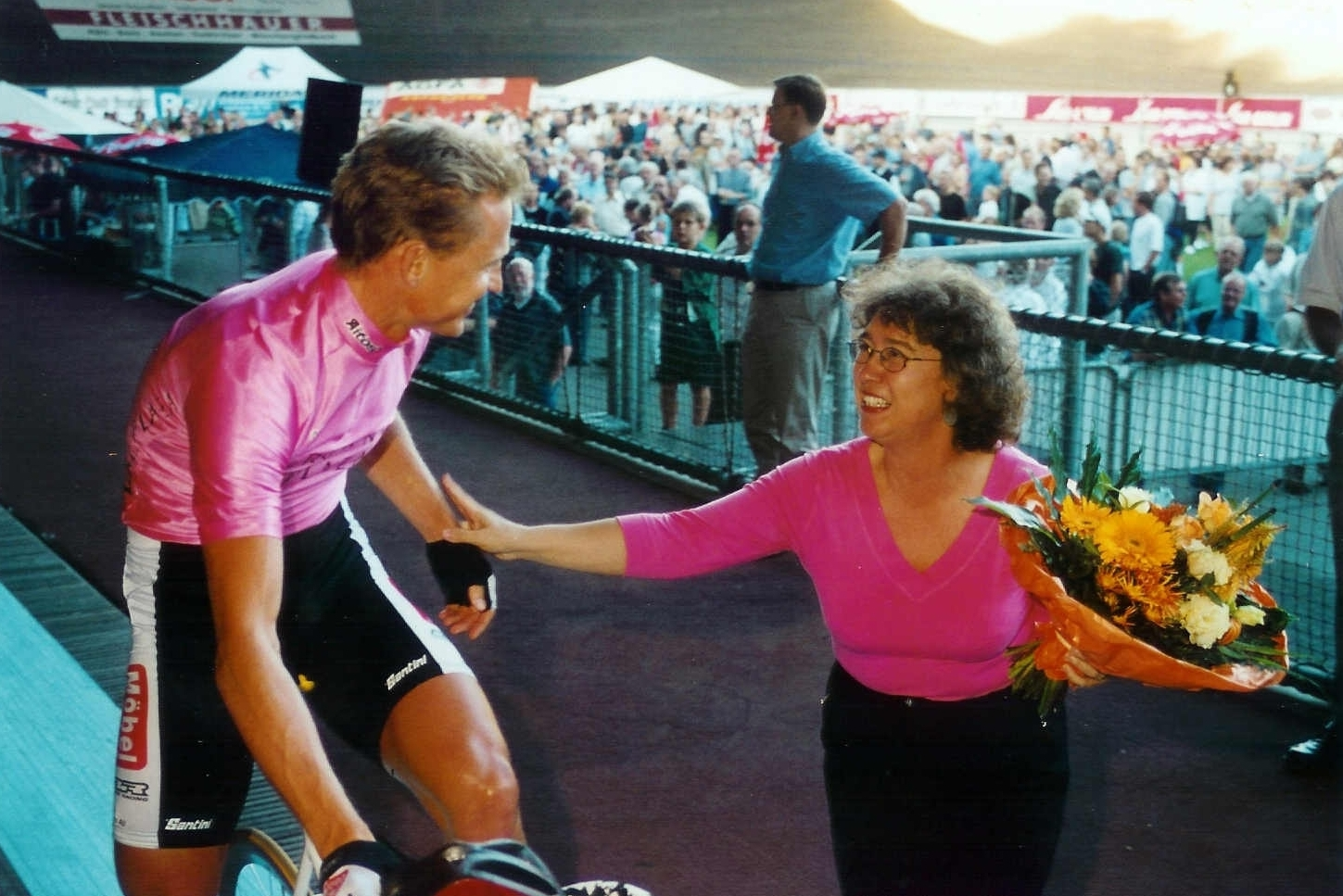

Personal information
- Full name: Kurt Betschart
- Born: 25 August 1968 (age 58) Erstfeld, Switzerland

Cycling career
- Sport: Cycling
- Discipline: Track
- Role: Retired Rider
- Rider type: Six Day

Professional teams
- 1991: Seco
- 1992: Seco-Scott, Bleiker
- 1993: Seco-Scott, Amore & Vita-Galatron
- 1994: I.K.O. - Corratec, Decarte - Ovronnaz
- 1995: I.K.O. - Corratec
- 1996: Wheeler
- 1997: Diamont Back
- 1998–2006: Mobel Marki

Major wins
- 37 "Six Day" wins 1st in National Track Championship 2001, Points; European Madison Champion (with Bruno Risi) 1995
Medal record
Representing Switzerland
Men's track cycling
World Championships
Bronze medal – third place	1995	Madison with Bruno Risi
European
Gold medal – first place	1995	Madison with Bruno Risi
Silver medal – second place	1996	Madison with Bruno Risi
Bronze medal – third place	2000	Madison with Bruno Risi
Bronze medal – third place	2000	Madison with Bruno Risi
Bronze medal – third place	2001	Madison with Bruno Risi
Silver medal – second place	2002	Madison with Bruno Risi
Bronze medal – third place	2003	Madison with Bruno Risi

Kurt Betschart born 25 August 1968 in Erstfeld Switzerland is a former professional cyclist. He was a Six Day Track specialist holding a world record 37 victories with the same partner, Bruno Risi. He had a total of 47 professional victories and represented Switzerland at the Olympic games. After sixteen years in professional cycling Kurt retired on 26 July 2006.

== Olympic Games ==
2000 Summer Olympics - Sydney
11th, Men's Madison (Track cycling)

== Palmares ==
1991
2nd in Giro del Lago Maggiore - GP Knorr (SUI)
3rd, Six Days of Zürich (with Bruno Risi)
1992
1st, Six Days of Dortmund (with Bruno Risi)
3rd in Giro dei Sei Comuni (SUI)
2nd in Giro del Lago Maggiore - GP Knorr (SUI)
3rd, Six Days of Munich (GER)
3rd in General Classification Niederoesterreich Rundfahrt (AUT)
1st, Six Days of Zürich; + Bruno Risi
2nd in General Classification GP Brissago (SUI)
1993
1st, Six Days of Zürich (with Bruno Risi)
1st, Six Days of Dortmund (with Bruno Risi)
1st, Six Days of Ghent (with Bruno Risi)
1st, Six Days of Munich (with Bruno Risi)
2nd, National Team Pursuit Championship (with Bruno Risi/Büchler/Gisler)
3rd, Six Days of Bremen (with Bruno Risi)
1994
1st, Six-Days of København (DEN)(with Bruno Risi)
1st, Six Days of Munich (with Bruno Risi)
1st, Six-Days' of Bordeaux (FRA) (with Bruno Risi)
3rd, Six Days of Antwerpen (BEL) (with Bruno Risi)
2nd, Six Days of Bremen (GER)
2nd, Six Days of Dortmund (GER)
3rd in Hegiberg-Rundfahrt (SUI)
3rd, Six Days of Cologne (GER)
2nd, Six Days of Stuttgart (GER)
2nd, Six Days of Zürich (SUI)
1995
(Europe) European Madison Champion (with Bruno Risi)
1st, Six Days of Bremen (with Bruno Risi)
1st, Six Days of Cologne (with Bruno Risi)
1st, Six Days of Zürich; + Bruno Risi
(bronze) 3rd World Madison Championship (with Bruno Risi), Bogota
2nd, Six Days of Dortmund (GER)
2nd, Six Days of Stuttgart (GER)
3rd, Six Days of Herning (DEN)
1996
1st, Six Days of Ghent (with Bruno Risi)
1st, Six-Days of København (with Bruno Risi)
1st, Six Days of Zürich (with Bruno Risi)
(silver) 2nd European Madison Championship (with Bruno Risi)
2nd, National Team Pursuit Championship (with Bruno Risi/Gisler/Strüby)
2nd, Six Days of Bassano del Grappa (ITA)
2nd, Six Days of Bremen (GER)
2nd, Six Days of Munich (GER)
2nd, Six Days of Milan (ITA)
2nd, Six Days of Stuttgart (GER)
2nd in National Championship, Track, Team Pursuit, Elite, Switzerland, Zürich (SUI)
3rd, Six Days of Dortmund (GER)
3rd in Erstfeld (SUI)
1997
1st, Six Days of Dortmund (with Bruno Risi)
1st, Six-Days' of Leipzig (with Bruno Risi)
1st, Six Days of Munich (with Bruno Risi)
(silver) 2nd European Madison Championship (with Bruno Risi)
2nd in Bordeaux, Six Days (FRA)
2nd in European Championship, Track, Madison, Elite
2nd, Six Days of Stuttgart (GER)
2nd, Six Days of Milan (ITA)
2nd, Six Days of Zürich (SUI)
3rd, Six Days of Herning (DEN)
3rd, Six Days of Bremen (GER)
3rd, Six Days of Bassano del Grappa (ITA)
1998
1st, Six Days of Munich (with Bruno Risi)
1st, Six Days of Stuttgart (with Bruno Risi)
1st, Six Days of Herning (with Bruno Risi)
1st, Six Days of Zürich (with Bruno Risi)
2nd, Six Days of Dortmund (GER)
3rd, Six Days of Bremen (GER)
3rd, Six-Days of København (DEN)
3rd in Hyères, Madison, Hyères (FRA)
1999
1st, Six Days of Bremen (with Bruno Risi)
1st, Six Days of Dortmund (with Bruno Risi)
1st, Six Days of Zürich (with Bruno Risi)
2nd, Six Days of Munich (GER)
2nd, Six Days of Fiorenzuola d' Arda (ITA)
2000
1st, Six Days of Munich (with Bruno Risi)
1st, Six Days of Zürich (with Bruno Risi, Markus Zberg)
(bronze) 3rd European Madison Championship (with Bruno Risi)
3rd, Six Days of Dortmund (GER)
3rd, Six Days of Fiorenzuola d' Arda (ITA)
2001
1st in National Championship, Track, Points race, Zürich, Switzerland
(bronze) 3rd European Madison Championship (with Bruno Risi)
1st in Dachau (GER)
2nd, Six Days of Dortmund (GER)
2nd, Six Days of Ghent (BEL)
2nd, Six Days of Munich (GER)
2nd, Six Days of Torino (ITA)
3rd, Six Days of Zürich (SUI)
3rd in Weil-am-Rhein (GER)
2nd in Silenen - Amsteg - Bristen (SUI)
2002
1st, Six Days of Bremen (with Bruno Risi)
1st, Six Days of Ghent (with Bruno Risi)
1st, Six Days of Stuttgart (with Bruno Risi)
(silver) 2nd European Madison Championship (with Bruno Risi)
1st in Silenen - Amsteg - Bristen (SUI)
1st in Stadtkriterium Thun (SUI)
1st in Osnabrück, Derny (GER)
2nd, Six Days of Munich (GER)
2nd in City Night Rhede, Derny (GER)
2nd in Rominger Classic, Engelberg (SUI)
3rd, Six Days of Dortmund (GER)
3rd, Six Days of Torino (ITA)
3rd, Six-Days of København (DEN)
3rd in Stuttgart-Hohenheim (GER)
2003
(bronze) European Madison Championship (with Bruno Risi)
1st, Six Days of Berlin (with Bruno Risi)
1st, Six Days of Dortmund (with Bruno Risi)
1st, Six Days of Munich (with Bruno Risi)
2nd, Six Days of Amsterdam (NED)
1st in Osnabrück (GER)
1st in Dachau (GER)
3rd in Chur - Arosa (SUI)
2nd in Stage 1 Rominger Classic (SUI)
2nd in Stage 2 Rominger Classic (SUI)
3rd in Trois Jours d'Aigle (SUI)
3rd, Six Days of Ghent (BEL)
3rd in Schattdorf (SUI)
2004
1st, Six Days of Bremen (with Bruno Risi)
1st in Silenen - Amsteg - Bristen (SUI)
1st in Gelsenkirchen (b) (GER)
2nd, Six Days of Stuttgart (GER)
2nd, Six Days of Amsterdam (NED)
3rd in Einhausen - Entega GP (GER)
3rd in Dahme Trophy (GER)
2005
1st, Six Days of Stuttgart (with Bruno Risi & Franco Marvulli)
1st, Six Days of Amsterdam (with Bruno Risi)
1st, Six Days of Berlin (with Bruno Risi)
2nd, Six Days of Rotterdam (NED)
2nd, Six Days of Bremen (GER)
2nd in Trois Jours d'Aigle (SUI)
2nd, Six Days of Dortmund (GER)
3rd, Six Days of Munich (GER)
3rd, Six Days of Ghent (BEL)
2006
2nd, Six-Days of København (DEN)
3rd, Six Days of Stuttgart (GER)
