= Thorsten Rund =

German cyclist (born 1976)

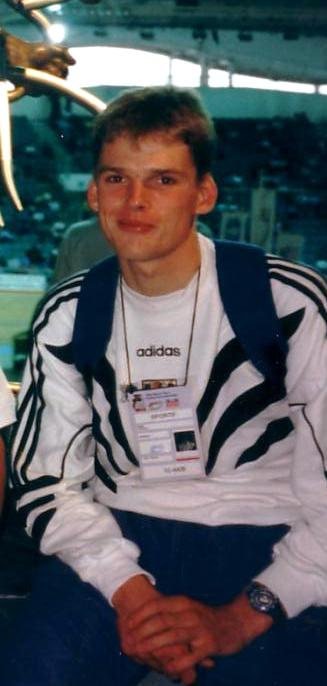
- Thorsten Rund in 1996

Personal information
- Born: 25 February 1976 (age 50) Lübben, East Germany

Cycling career
- Sport: Cycling
- Current team: Retired
- Disciplines: Road, track
- Role: Rider

Professional teams
- 1997–1998: Agro–Adler Brandenburg
- 2001–2003: Team Coast–Buffalo
- 2004: Winfix Arnolds Sicherheit
- 2005: Radshop Haueisen–Thüringen
Medal record
Men's track cycling
Representing Germany
World Championships
Bronze medal – third place	1996 Manchester	Team Pursuit

Thorsten Rund (born 25 February 1976 in Lübben) is a German former professional road and track cyclist. He competed in the points race at the 2000 Summer Olympics. He also rode in the 2003 Vuelta a España, finishing 142nd overall.

== Major results ==
1993
UCI Junior Track World Championships

1st Team pursuit
1st Points race
3rd Individual pursuit

1994
2nd Individual pursuit, UCI Junior Track World Championships
1995
2nd Team pursuit, National Track Championships
1996
3rd Team pursuit, UCI Track World Championships
1998
2nd Madison, National Track Championships
1999
National Track Championships

1st Madison (with Guido Fulst)
2nd Team pursuit

1st Stage 5 Volta a Tarragona
2000
3rd Team pursuit, National Track Championships
2004
3rd Team pursuit, National Track Championships
9th Rund um die Nürnberger Altstadt
