= Marion Clignet =

French track cyclist

Personal information
- Full name: Marion Clignet
- Born: 21 February 1964 (age 62) Hyde Park, Chicago, United States

Cycling career
- Sport: Cycling
- Disciplines: Track, road
- Role: Rider
- Rider type: Pursuit, time-trialist
Medal record
Representing France
Women's Road bicycle racing
World Championships
Gold medal – first place	1991 Stuttgart	Team time trial
Women's Track cycling
Olympic Games
Silver medal – second place	1996 Atlanta	Individual pursuit
Silver medal – second place	2000 Sydney	Individual pursuit
World Championships
Gold medal – first place	1994 Palermo	Individual pursuit
Gold medal – first place	1996 Manchester	Individual pursuit
Gold medal – first place	1999 Berlin	Individual pursuit
Gold medal – first place	1999 Berlin	Points race
Gold medal – first place	2000 Manchester	Points race
Silver medal – second place	1993 Hamar	Individual pursuit
Bronze medal – third place	1991 Stuttgart	Individual pursuit

Marion Clignet (French: [maʁjɔn kliɲɛ]; born 21 February 1964) is a French former track cyclist. Born in Chicago, United States, Clignet was diagnosed with epilepsy at the age of 22 and was shunned by the United States Cycling Federation. She subsequently raced for France from 1991 onwards. She rode at three Olympic Games for France, winning two silver medals in the individual pursuit. Clignet won six world championships in the late 1990s – 3 times in the individual pursuit and 2 times in the points race on the track, and the team time trial on the road.

== Major results ==
1990
United States National Road Championships

(silver) Road race

After 1990, Clignet competed in the French national championships

1991
National Track Championships

(gold) Individual pursuit

National Road Championships

(gold) Road race

Road World Championships

(gold) Team time trial (with Nathalie Gendron, Catherine Marsal and Cécile Odin)

Track Cycling World Championships, Stuttgart

(bronze) Individual pursuit

1992
National Track Championships

(silver) Individual pursuit

National Road Championships

(silver) Road race

1993
National Road Championships

(gold) Road race

2nd, Overall, Grande Boucle Féminine Internationale
Track Cycling World Championships, Hamar

(silver) Individual pursuit

1994
1st, Chrono des Herbiers
8th UCI Road World Championships – Women's time trial

1995
National Track Championships

(gold) Individual pursuit

1996
National Track Championships

(gold) Individual pursuit

National Road Championships

(gold) Individual time trial

Track Cycling World Championships, Manchester

(gold) Individual pursuit

1st, Overall, Tour du Finistère

1st, Prologue
1st, Stage 1
1st, Stage 2
1st, Stage 3
1st, Stage 4
1st, Stage 5

Olympic Games, Atlanta

(silver) Individual pursuit
5th, Road race

6th UCI Road World Championships – Women's time trial

1999
National Track Championships

(silver) Individual pursuit
(bronze) Points race

Track Cycling World Championships, Berlin

(gold) Individual pursuit
(gold) Points race

Track Cycling World Cup

1st, Individual pursuit, Cali
1st, Points race, Cali

2000
National Track Championships

(gold) Individual pursuit
(gold) Points race

National Road Championships

(bronze) Individual time trial

Track Cycling World Championships, Manchester

(gold) Points race

Olympic Games, Sydney

(silver) Individual pursuit

1st, Route Féminine Du Vignoble Nantais

2003
National Track Championships

(silver) Individual pursuit

Track Cycling World Cup

2nd, Points race, Sydney

== Honors and awards ==
- Officer of the Ordre National du Mérite (2000)
- Knight of the Order of Legion of Honour (2024)
