= Konrad Czajkowski =

Polish cyclist

Personal information
- Born: 11 January 1980 (age 46) Warsaw, Poland

Cycling career
- Sport: Cycling

Konrad Czajkowski (born 11 January 1980) is a Polish cyclist. He competed in the men's team sprint at the 2000 Summer Olympics.
