= Jens Fiedler (cyclist) =

German cyclist (born 1970)

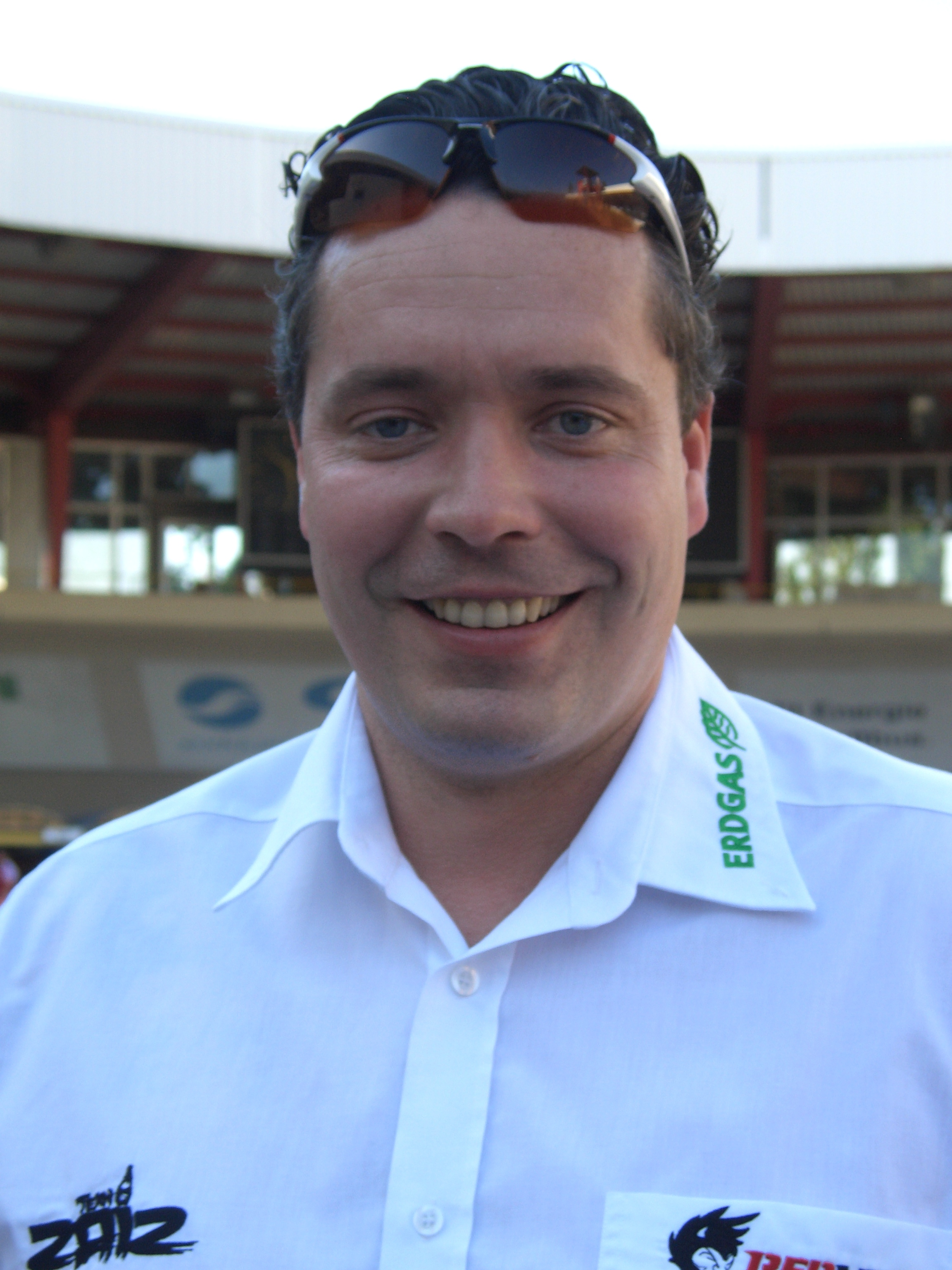

Personal information
- Full name: Jens Fiedler
- Born: 15 February 1970 (age 56) Dohna, Bezirk Dresden, East Germany

Cycling career
- Sport: Cycling
- Discipline: Track
- Role: Rider
- Rider type: Sprinter

Professional teams
- 1993–1996: Neue Walthersdorfer
- 1997–1999: XXL Erdgas
Medal record
Representing Germany
Men's track cycling
Olympic Games
Gold medal – first place	1992 Barcelona	Sprint
Gold medal – first place	1996 Atlanta	Sprint
Gold medal – first place	2004 Athens	Team Sprint
Bronze medal – third place	2000 Sydney	Sprint
Bronze medal – third place	2000 Sydney	Keirin
World Championship
Gold medal – first place	1991 Stuttgart	Amateur Sprint
Gold medal – first place	1995 Bogotá	Team sprint
Gold medal – first place	1998 Bordeaux	Keirin
Gold medal – first place	1999 Berlin	Keirin
Gold medal – first place	2003 Stuttgart	Team Sprint
Silver medal – second place	1996 Manchester	Team Sprint
Silver medal – second place	1997 Perth	Sprint
Silver medal – second place	1998 Bordeaux	Sprint
Silver medal – second place	1999 Berlin	Sprint
Silver medal – second place	2000 Manchester	Keirin
Bronze medal – third place	2000 Manchester	Sprint
Bronze medal – third place	2001 Antwerp	Keirin
Bronze medal – third place	2002 Copenhagen	Team Sprint

Jens Fiedler (born 15 February 1970) is a German triple Olympic champion and multiple world champion track cyclist. He retired from competitive cycling in early 2005.

== Major results ==
1992
1st Olympic Games, Sprint
1st National Championship, Sprint
1993
1st National Championship, Sprint
1994
1st National Championship, Sprint
1995
1st National Championship, Sprint
1st World Championship, Team sprint (with Michael Hübner, Jan van Eijden)
1996
1st Olympic Games, Sprint
1st National Championship, Sprint
1997
2nd World Championship, Sprint
1998
1st National Championship, Sprint
1st World Championship, Keirin
2nd World Championship, Sprint
1999
1st National Championship, Team sprint (with Jan van Eijden, Eyk Pokorny)
1st National Championship, Sprint
1st World Championship, Keirin
2000
1st National Championship, Team sprint (with Jan van Eijden, Carsten Bergemann)
3rd Olympic Games, Sprint
3rd Olympic Games, Keirin
2nd World Championship, Keirin
2001
1st National Championship, Team sprint (with Sören Yves Lausberg, Eyk Pokorny)
3rd World Championship, Keirin
2002
1st National Championship, Keirin
1st National Championship, Sprint
1st National Championship, Team sprint (with Stefan Nimke, Carsten Bergemann)
3rd World Championship, Team sprint
2003
2nd National Championship, Team sprint (with Stefan Nimke, Carsten Bergemann)
1st World Championship, Team sprint (with René Wolff, Carsten Bergemann)
2004
1st National Championship, Team sprint (with Stefan Nimke, Carsten Bergemann)
1st Olympic Games, Team sprint (with Stefan Nimke, René Wolff)

== Personal and professional ==
For many years Fiedler has lived in Chemnitz. He is trained as an electrician, and currently works for the city's power supply company. He lives with his third wife.

Since 2009 he has also been the manager of the UCI Track Team, "Erdgas".
