= Matt Sinton =

New Zealand cyclist (born 1976)

Personal information
- Born: 3 June 1976 (age 50)

Sport
- Country: New Zealand
- Sport: Cycling

Matt Sinton (born 03 June 1976) is a New Zealand cyclist. He competed at the 2000 Summer Olympics in Sydney, in the Men's keirin and the men's track time trial.

He attended High School at Waitākere College.
