= Darryn Hill =

Australian cyclist

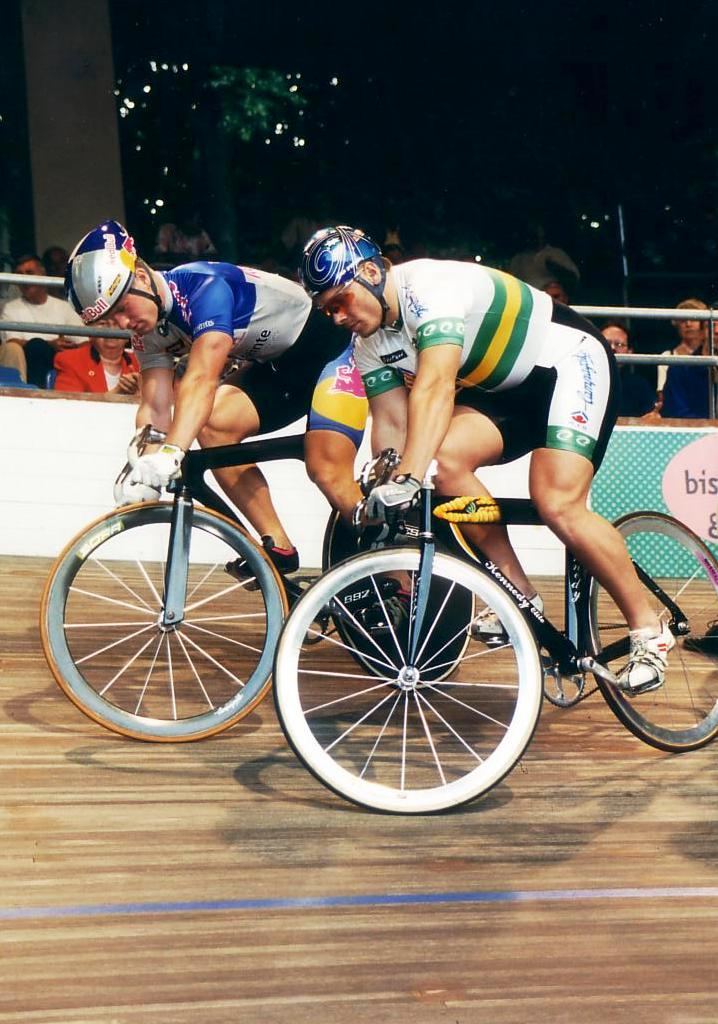
- Hill (right)

Personal information
- Full name: Darryn William Hill
- Born: 11 August 1974 (age 52) Perth, Western Australia

Cycling career
- Sport: Cycling
- Discipline: Track
- Role: Rider
- Rider type: Sprint
Medal record
Men's track cycling
Representing Australia
Olympic Games
Bronze medal – third place	2000 Sydney	Sprint
Commonwealth Games
Silver medal – second place	1994 Victoria	1 km time trial
Bronze medal – third place	1994 Victoria	Sprint
Silver medal – second place	1998 Kuala Lumpur	Sprint
World Championships
Gold medal – first place	1995 Bogotá	Sprint
Gold medal – first place	1996 Manchester	Team sprint
Silver medal – second place	1994 Palermo	Sprint
Bronze medal – third place	1996 Manchester	Sprint
Bronze medal – third place	1997 Perth	Sprint

Darryn William Hill (born 11 August 1974) is an Australian former racing cyclist, specialising in the sprint events of track cycling. Hill was an Australian Institute of Sport scholarship holder.

== Major results ==
1994
Commonwealth Games, Victoria

(silver) 1 km time trial
(bronze) Sprint

Track Cycling World Championships, Palermo

(silver) Sprint

1995
Track Cycling World Championships, Bogotá

(gold) Sprint

1996
Track Cycling World Championships, Manchester

(gold) Team Sprint (with Shane Kelly and Gary Neiwand)
(bronze) Sprint

1997
Track Cycling World Championships, Perth

(bronze) Sprint

1998
Track Cycling World Cup

(silver) Keirin, Berlin

Commonwealth Games, Kual Lumpur

(gold) Sprint

1999
Track Cycling World Cup

(silver) Sprint, Mexico City

2000
Olympic Games, Sydney

(bronze) Sprint
