= Jaroslav Jeřábek =

Slovak cyclist

Personal information
- Born: 2 April 1971 (age 55) Louny, Czechoslovakia

Cycling career
- Sport: Cycling

Jaroslav Jeřábek (born 2 April 1971) is a Slovak former cyclist. He competed for Czechoslovakia at the 1992 Summer Olympics and for Slovakia at the 2000 Summer Olympics and the 2004 Summer Olympics.
