= Roberto Chiappa =

Italian track cyclist

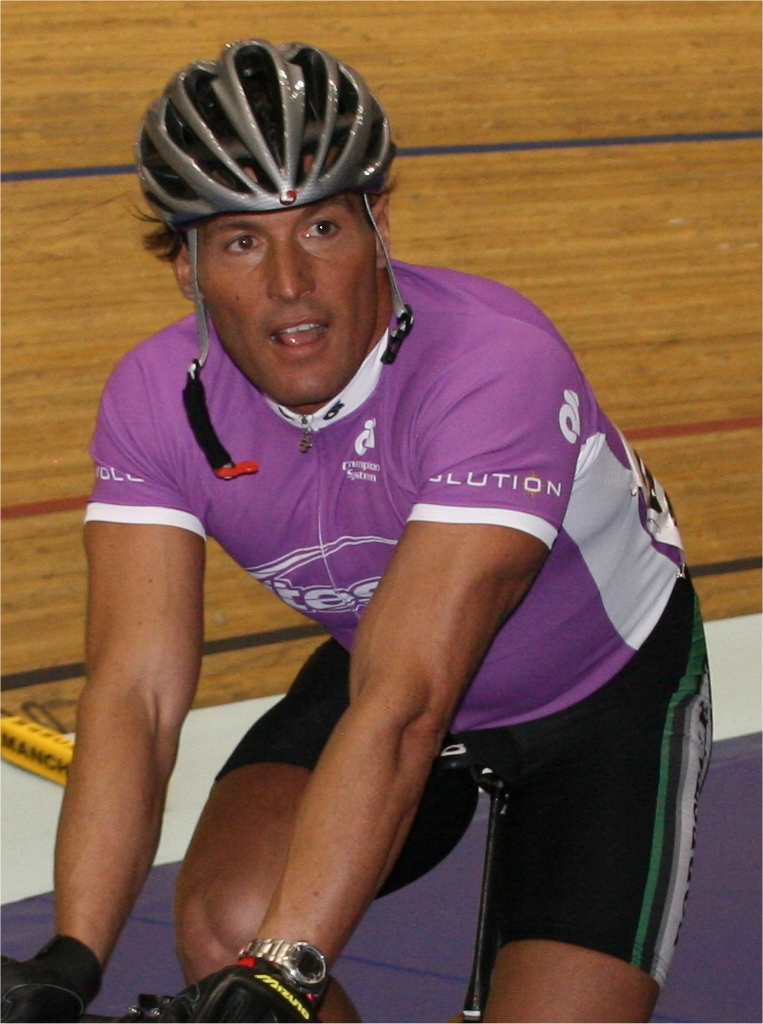

Personal information
- Full name: Roberto Chiappa
- Born: 11 September 1973 (age 53) Terni, Italy

Cycling career
- Sport: Cycling
- Discipline: Track
- Role: Rider

Roberto Chiappa (born 11 September 1973) is an Italian track cyclist born in Terni. He is a 44-time Italian Champion and became World Junior Sprint Champion in 1991, as well as World Champion in 1993 in the Tandem. He holds the Italian 200m Record in 10.18s. He rode at four Olympic Games.

== Career highlights ==
1990
(bronze) , World U19 Sprint Championship, Middlesbrough (GBR)
1991
World U19 Sprint Champion, Colorado Springs (USA)
1992
4th, Olympic Games, Sprint, Barcelona (SPA)
1993
World Amateur Tandem Champion, Hamar (NOR-with Federico Paris)
1994
(bronze) , World Amateur Tandem Championship, Palermo (ITA-with Federico Paris)
1996
3rd, World Cup, Track, Sprint, Busto Garolfo (ITA)
9th, Olympic Games, Sprint, Atlanta (USA)
1997
World Military Sprint Champion
1998
1st, World Cup, Track, Keirin, Hyères (FRA)
1999
1st, World Cup, Track, Keirin, Mexico City (MEX)
2nd, World Cup, Track, Keirin, Frisco, Texas (USA)
(bronze) , European Omnium Sprints Championship
2000
7th, Olympic Games, Sprint, Sydney (AUS)
2004
Italy Keirin Champion, Pordenone
Italy Sprint Champion, Pordenone
2005
Italy Keirin Champion, San Vincenzo
Italy Sprint Champion, San Vincenzo
2006
Italy Keirin Champion, Pordenone
Italy Sprint Champion, Pordenone
Italy Team Sprint Champion, Pordenone
7th, World Sprint Championship, Bordeaux (FRA)
7th, World Keirin Championship, Bordeaux (FRA)
2007
Italy Keirin Champion, Dalmine
Italy Sprint Champion, Dalmine
Italy Team Sprint Champion, Dalmine (with Ivan Quaranta & Marco Brossa)
1st, International Sprint Grand Prix, Trexlertown, Pennsylvania (USA)
1st, Keirin, Air Products Finals, Trexlertown, Pennsylvania (USA)
2nd, World Cup, Track, Sprint, Los Angeles (USA)
7th, World Sprint Championship, Palma de Mallorca (SPA)
2008
1st, World Cup, Track, Sprint, Los Angeles (USA)
4th, World Sprint Championship, Manchester (GBR)
1st, International Keirin Cup, Trexlertown, Pennsylvania (USA)
Italy Keirin Champion, Dalmine
Italy Sprint Champion, Dalmine
Italy Team Sprint Champion, Dalmine
