= David Cabrero =

Spanish cyclist (1976–2026)

Personal information
- Full name: David Cabrero Buenache
- Born: 11 December 1976 Madrid, Spain
- Died: 27 March 2026 (aged 49)

Cycling career
- Sport: Cycling

David Cabrero Buenache (11 December 1976 – 27 March 2026) was a Spanish cyclist. He competed in two events at the 2000 Summer Olympics.

Cabrero died after a long illness on 27 March 2026, at the age of 49.
