= Félicia Ballanger =

French cyclist (born 1971)

Personal information
- Full name: Félicia Ballanger
- Born: 12 June 1971 (age 55) La Roche-sur-Yon, Vendée, France

Cycling career
- Sport: Cycling
Medal record
Women's track cycling
Representing France
Olympic Games
Gold medal – first place	1996 Atlanta	Sprint
Gold medal – first place	2000 Sydney	Sprint
Gold medal – first place	2000 Sydney	500 m time trial
UCI Track World Championships
Gold medal – first place	1995 Bogota	Sprint
Gold medal – first place	1995 Bogota	500 m time trial
Gold medal – first place	1996 Manchester	Sprint
Gold medal – first place	1996 Manchester	500 m time trial
Gold medal – first place	1997 Perth	Sprint
Gold medal – first place	1997 Perth	500 m time trial
Gold medal – first place	1998 Bordeaux	Sprint
Gold medal – first place	1998 Bordeaux	500 m time trial
Gold medal – first place	1999 Berlin	Sprint
Gold medal – first place	1999 Berlin	500 m time trial
Silver medal – second place	1994 Palermo	Sprint

Félicia Ballanger (born 12 June 1971) is a French retired racing cyclist.

She won five world championships in the sprint and 500 m time trial. She was also a triple Olympic champion. She is 1.68 metres (5 ft 6 in) tall and weighs 70 kilograms (150 lb).

== Biography ==
Félicia Ballanger was born on 12 June 1971 in La Roche-sur-Yon. She is one of two children. Her mother named her Félicia after the Italian Tour de France winner Felice Gimondi and her brother, Frédéric, after the Spanish winner, Federico Bahamontes).

Ballanger was at first both a cyclist and a handball player. For cycling she was a member of Vendée la Roche Cycliste.

She came fourth in her first world championship and again the following year, 1992, at the Olympic Games in Barcelona. She crashed the following year, breaking a collarbone and having her thigh pierced by a splinter from the velodrome.

Her first world championship medal came the following season. She took silver in the sprint. Trained by Daniel Morelon, the former world sprint champion, she won her first world championships in 1995, winning the 500 m time-trial and the sprint. She won both again in the four following years. She also won the Olympic sprint medal at Atlanta.

Her last international was the 2000 Olympic Games in Sydney. She won the 500 metres. In the same year she was awarded the Vélo d'Or français, and remained the only female awardee until 2022. In 2001, she became vice-president of the Fédération Française de Cyclisme.

=== Personal life ===
Ballanger is married, has two children and has lived in Nouméa since 1998. She is involved in politics there. She was a television commentator during the Olympic Games in Beijing in 2008.

== Palmarès ==
=== Olympic Games ===
- (gold) 1996 1st sprint
- (gold) 2000 1st sprint, 1st 500m

=== World championship ===
- (gold) 1995, 1996, 1997, 1998, 1999 1st sprint
- (gold) 1995, 1996, 1997, 1998, 1999 1st 500m
- (silver) 1994 2nd sprint
- 1988 1st junior sprint

=== National championships ===
- Sprint: 1992, 1994...
- Youth sprint : 1986

=== World records ===
- 500m 35"811 3 July 1993 Hyères
- 500m 35"190 28 July 1993 Bordeaux
- 500m 34"604 3 July 1994 Hyères
- 500m 34"474 22 July 1994 Colorado Springs
- 500m 34"017 29 September Bogotá
- 500m 34"010 29 August 1998 Bordeaux
