= Roland Garber =

Austrian cyclist

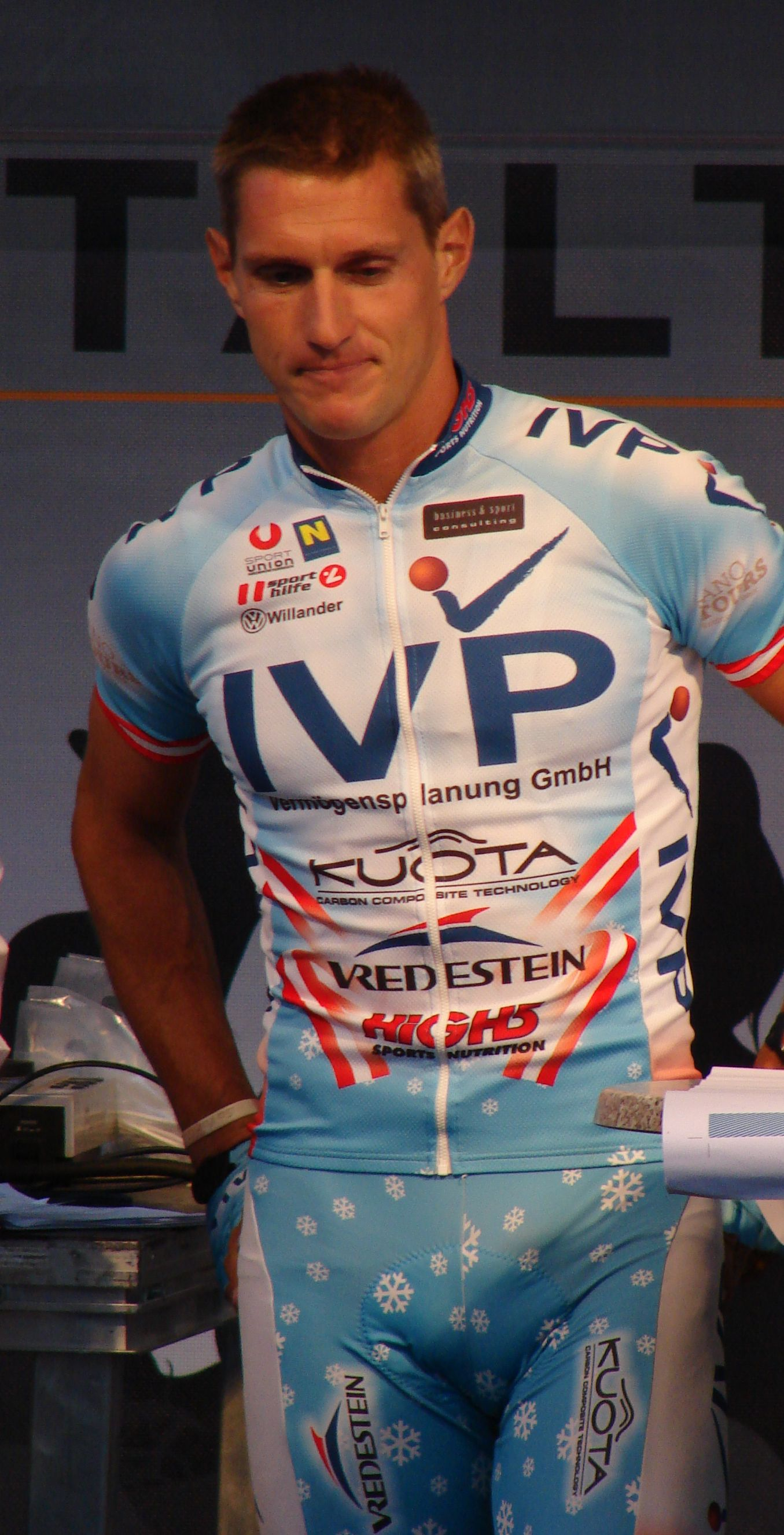

Personal information
- Born: 27 August 1972 (age 54) Vienna, Austria

Cycling career
- Sport: Cycling
- Current team: Retired
- Disciplines: Track, road
- Role: Rider

Professional team
- 2002–2004: Elk Haus
Medal record
Representing Austria
Men's track cycling
UCI Track World Championships
Silver medal – second place	2002 Copenhagen	Madison

Roland Garber (born 27 August 1972 in Vienna) is a former Austrian cyclist. He rode in the Madison at the 2000 and the 2004 Summer Olympics.

== Palmares ==
=== Track ===
2002
1st World Cup Madison (with Franz Stocher)

=== Road ===
1998
2nd National Time Trial Championships
