= Tim Carswell =

New Zealand cyclist (born 1971)

Personal information
- Born: 22 October 1971 (age 55)
Medal record
Men's track cycling
Commonwealth Games
Bronze medal – third place	1998 Kuala Lumpur	20km scratch race
Bronze medal – third place	1998 Kuala Lumpur	Team pursuit

Timothy Christopher Carswell (born 22 October 1971) is a former New Zealand racing cyclist. He won two bronze medals at the 1998 Commonwealth Games; one in the twenty kilometre scratch race and one in the team pursuit alongside fellow riders Brendon Cameron, Greg Henderson and Lee Vertongen.

He competed at two Olympics; in 1996 at Atlanta the team came 8th in the 4000m team pursuit, and in 2000 at Sydney the team came 6th in the 4000m team pursuit.

== Career ==
After a two year stint for Carswell with the UCI World Cycling Centre as head coach he returned home to New Zealand ad was appointed Endurance coach for the National track program. In 2016 Carswell joined the St Peter's School Cycling team as coach with his wife to help promote cycling to the younger generations. In February 2019 Carswell was appointed Head Coach of the Waikato hub of the Cycling New Zealand Network. In April 2022 Carswell was appointed the position of National coach for the Belgium Track cycling team. He has a contract with them until the end of the 2024 Summer Olympics.

== Major results ==
1999
8th Overall New Zealand Cycle Classic

1st Stage 2
