= Gary Neiwand =

Australian track cyclist

Personal information
- Full name: Gary Neiwand
- Born: 4 September 1966 (age 60) Melbourne, Victoria, Australia

Cycling career
- Sport: Cycling
- Current team: Team FORDE
- Discipline: Track
- Role: Coach
- Rider type: Sprinter

Professional team
- 1992–1995: Foster's
Medal record
Men's track cycling
Representing Australia
Olympic Games
Silver medal – second place	1992 Barcelona	Sprint
Silver medal – second place	2000 Sydney	Keirin
Bronze medal – third place	1988 Seoul	Sprint
Bronze medal – third place	2000 Sydney	Team sprint
World Championships
Gold medal – first place	1993 Hamar	Sprint
Gold medal – first place	1993 Hamar	Keirin
Gold medal – first place	1996 Manchester	Team sprint
Silver medal – second place	1996 Manchester	Keirin
Bronze medal – third place	1991 Stuttgart	Sprint
Commonwealth Games
Gold medal – first place	1986 Edinburgh	Sprint
Gold medal – first place	1990 Auckland	Sprint
Gold medal – first place	1994 Victoria	Sprint

Gary Malcolm Neiwand (born 4 September 1966) is an Australian retired track cyclist. He is a former world champion, who also won four Olympic medals during his career.

== Biography ==
=== Early life and career ===
Neiwand was born in Melbourne, Victoria, on 4 September 1966, the son of Ronald Charles Neiwand.

Neiwand represented his country at cycling for more than a decade. He was Commonwealth Games sprint champion in 1986 and won his first Olympic medal at the 1988 Summer Olympics in Seoul, winning bronze in the sprint event.

He repeated his success at the Commonwealth Games in 1990, taking the gold in the sprint. Neiwand won his first World Championship medal in 1991 in Stuttgart, winning the bronze in the sprint. He then went on to become the World Champion in both the keirin and sprint in 1993. 1994 saw Neiwand complete a hat-trick, winning his successive third sprint gold medal at the Commonwealth Games.

=== After cycling ===
Neiwand spiralled into depression after missing his goal of a gold medal in the Keirin at the 2000 Summer Olympics. He began drinking heavily, his marriage fell apart and he gained weight, ballooning to 116 kg.

In 2006 Neiwand was sentenced to eighteen months in prison for breaching a court order preventing him from harassing a former girlfriend.

Neiwand began his sentence at Port Phillip before being moved to Beechworth. He was released on probation after serving nine months in jail. He has since rebuilt his relationship with his children, Malcolm and Courtney, and ex-wife, Cathy.

Neiwand joined the Sunrise Foundation in 2007, an organisation which, through the high schools, aims to demystify and tackle depression in the community. It is run by former North Melbourne and Sydney footballer, Wayne Schwass.

On 5 December 2011 Niewand pleaded guilty to two charges of wilful and obscene exposure in Melbourne, after having been charged on two separate occasions in January and May 2011 for exposing himself to women while masturbating in his car. These offences occurred after Niewand had been released on a court order in December 2010 on unrelated charges, where he had been ordered to attend Forensicare and counselling about his behaviour. The court heard that having attended counselling over the previous six months Niewand had made significant progress, had his drinking problems under control, and was concerned and upset about his offending and his predicament. The magistrate regarded a report from the Forensicare counsellor as "promising", adjourning the case until March 2012 when he was sentenced to four months jail, wholly suspended for two years.

== Awards and honours ==
Neiwand received the Australian Sports Medal on 14 July 2000 and the Centenary Medal on 1 January 2001.

== Major results ==
1986
1st Sprint, Commonwealth Games
3rd Sprint, Goodwill Games, Moscow

1988
3rd Sprint Summer Olympics

1990
1st Sprint, Commonwealth Games

1991
3rd Sprint, UCI Track Cycling World Championships

1992
2nd Sprint, Summer Olympics
1st Sprint, Copenhagen

1993
2nd Sprint, GP de Paris
1st Keirin, UCI Track Cycling World Championships
1st Sprint, UCI Track Cycling World Championships

1994
1st Sprint, Commonwealth Games

1996
2nd Sprint, Busto Garolfo
2nd Keirin, UCI Track Cycling World Championships
1st Team Sprint, UCI Track Cycling World Championships (with Darryn William Hill & Shane Kelly)

1999
2nd Team Sprint, Frisco

2000
3rd Sprint, Summer Olympics
2nd Keirin, Summer Olympics
