= Silvio Martinello =

Italian cyclist (born 1963)

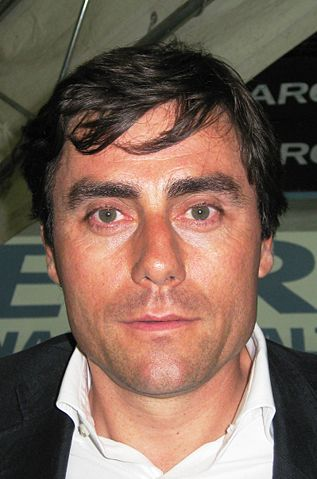

Personal information
- Born: 19 January 1963 (age 63) Padua, Italy
- Height: 1.79 m (5 ft 10 in)
- Weight: 79 kg (174 lb; 12.4 st)

Cycling career
- Sport: Cycling
- Current team: Retired
- Disciplines: Road; Track
- Role: Rider

Professional teams
- 1986–1987: Sammontana–Bianchi
- 1988–1989: Atala–Ofmega
- 1990: Jolly Componibili–Club 88
- 1991: Gis Gelati–Ballan
- 1992–1995: Mercatone Uno–Medeghini–Zucchini
- 1996–1997: Saeco–AS Juvenes San Marino
- 1998–2000: Team Polti

Major wins
- Grand Tours Giro d'Italia 2 individual stages (1991, 1996) Vuelta a España 1 individual stage (1990)
Medal record
Men's cycling
Representing Italy
Olympic Games
Gold medal – first place	1996 Atlanta	Points Race
Bronze medal – third place	2000 Sydney	Madison
World Championships
Gold medal – first place	1985 Bassano del Grappa	Team pursuit
Gold medal – first place	1995 Bogotá	Points Race
Gold medal – first place	1995 Bogotá	Madison
Gold medal – first place	1996 Manchester	Madison
Gold medal – first place	1997 Perth	Points Race
Silver medal – second place	1997 Perth	Madison
Silver medal – second place	1998 Bordeaux	Madison
Bronze medal – third place	1998 Bordeaux	Points Race

Silvio Martinello (born 19 January 1963) is a retired road bicycle and track cyclist from Italy. He won the gold medal in the men's points race at the 1996 Summer Olympics in Atlanta, Georgia, followed by the bronze medal in the men's madison in Sydney, Australia alongside Marco Villa. He was a professional rider from 1986 to 2000.

== Major results ==
=== Road ===
1983
1st Giro del Belvedere
1989
2nd Giro della Provincia di Reggio Calabria
3rd Trofeo Laigueglia
1990
1st Stage 3 Vuelta a España
1991
1st Milano–Vignola
1st Stage 18 Giro d'Italia
1st Stage 4 Tirreno–Adriatico
1st Stage 1 Giro del Trentino
3rd Giro del Veneto
7th Trofeo Pantalica
8th Giro dell'Etna
1992
1st Stage 3 Three Days of De Panne
1993
3rd Giro della Provincia di Reggio Calabria
1994
3rd E3 Prijs Vlaanderen
3rd Grand Prix Pino Cerami
5th GP Rik Van Steenbergen
8th Scheldeprijs
1996
Giro d'Italia

1st Stage 1
Held after Stages 1–2 & 4–5
Held after Stages 1, 4–11 & 13

4th Grand Prix of Aargau Canton
10th Gent–Wevelgem
1997
1st Overall Giro di Puglia

1st Stage 2

1st Stage 2 Tour of Galicia
1st Stage 4 Setmana Catalana de Ciclisme
3rd Giro dell'Etna
1998
International Rheinland–Pfalz Rundfahrt

1st Stages 3b & 7

1st Stage 5 Four Days of Dunkirk
2nd Giro della Provincia di Siracusa
5th Overall Giro di Puglia
1999
1st Stage 2 Tour de Suisse
