= Sören Lausberg =

German cyclist (born 1969)

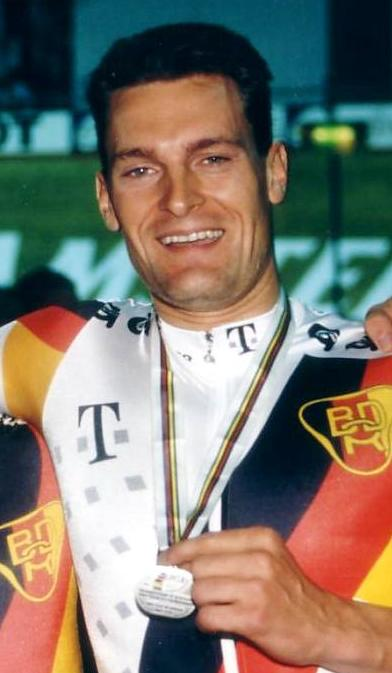
- Sören Lausberg in 1998

Personal information
- Full name: Sören Yves Lausberg
- Born: August 6, 1969 (age 57) Eisenhüttenstadt, East Germany

Cycling career
- Sport: Cycling
- Discipline: Track
- Role: Rider
- Rider type: Sprinter
Medal record
Representing Germany
Men's track cycling
World Championships
Silver medal – second place	1996 Manchester	Team sprint
Silver medal – second place	1996 Manchester	1000 m time trial
Silver medal – second place	1997 Perth	Team sprint
Silver medal – second place	1997 Perth	1000 m time trial
Silver medal – second place	2000 Manchester	1000 m time trial
Silver medal – second place	2001 Antwerp	1000 m time trial
Bronze medal – third place	1998 Bordeaux	Team sprint
Bronze medal – third place	1999 Berlin	Team sprint
Bronze medal – third place	2002 Copenhagen	Team sprint

Sören Yves Lausberg (born August 6, 1969, in Eisenhüttenstadt, Brandenburg, Germany) is a retired German track cyclist. He specialized in sprint events and competed in the 1,000-metre (1,100 yd) time trial at both the 1996 Summer Olympics and the 2000 Summer Olympics, finishing fourth in both competitions.

In the 2000 Olympics, he was also a member of the German team sprint squad, along with Jens Fiedler and Stefan Nimke, which placed seventh in the Olympic team sprint event.
