= Franz Stocher =

Austrian cyclist

Personal information
- Born: 23 March 1969 (age 57) Vienna, Austria

Cycling career
- Sport: Cycling
- Current team: Retired
- Disciplines: Track, road
- Role: Rider

Professional team
- 2002–2003: Elk Haus
Medal record
Representing Austria
Men's track cycling
UCI Track World Championships
| Gold medal – first place | 2003 Stuttgart | Points race |
| Silver medal – second place | 2002 Ballerup | Points race |
| Silver medal – second place | 2002 Copenhagen | Madison |
| Bronze medal – third place | 1994 Palermo | Points race |
| Bronze medal – third place | 2000 Manchester | Points race |
| Bronze medal – third place | 2001 Antwerp | Points race |

Franz Stocher (born 23 March 1969) is a former Austrian racing cyclist. A specialist of the track, he was the world champion in 2003 in the points race event. He competed at five Olympic Games.

== Palmares ==
=== Track ===
2002
1st World Cup Madison (with Roland Garber)

=== Road ===
1994
1st Uniqa Classic
1998
2nd GP Voralberg
2002
1st GP von Grafenbach
