= Jan van Eijden =

German cyclist (born 1976)

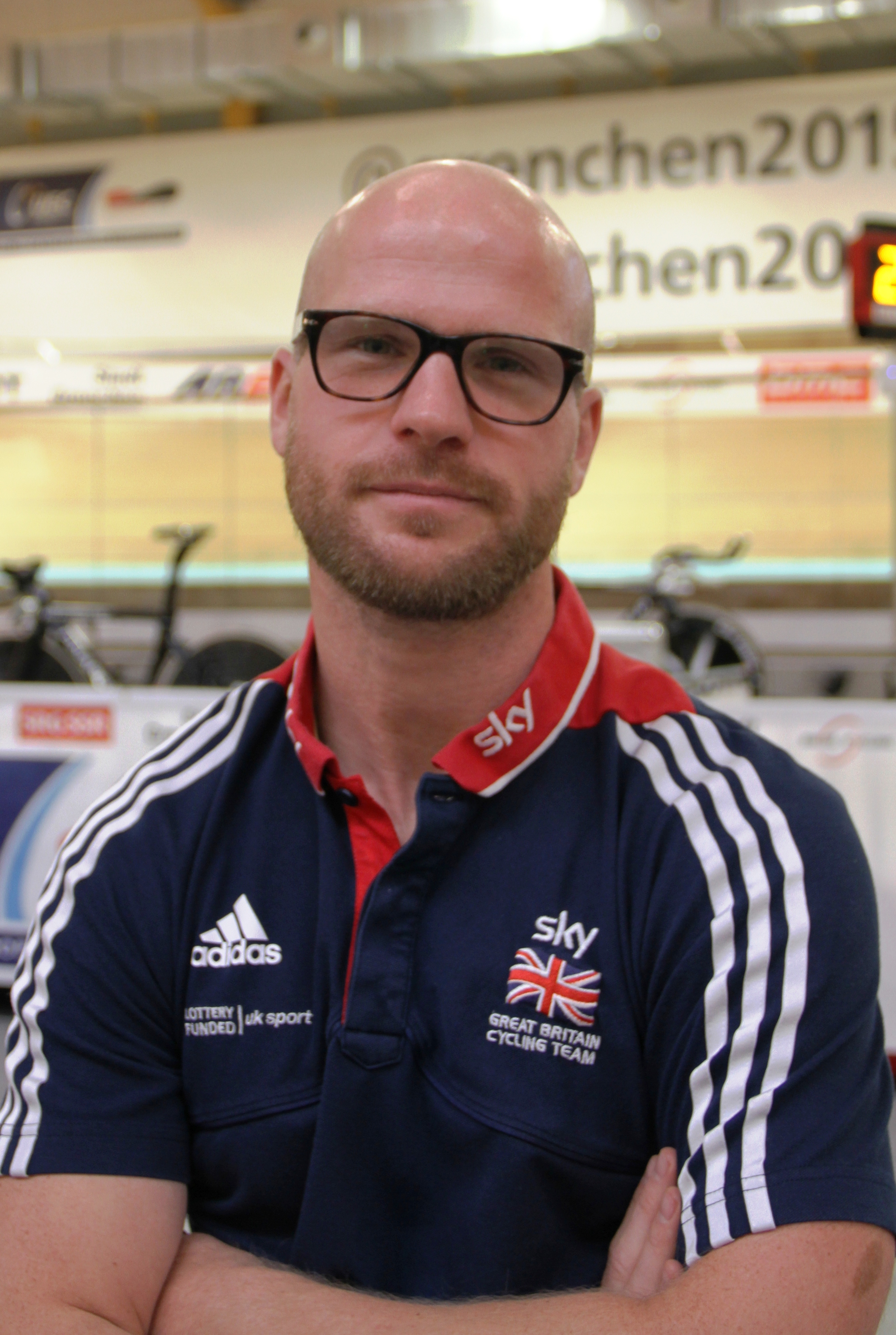
- Jan van Eijden (2015)

Personal information
- Full name: Jan van Eijden
- Born: 10 August 1976 (age 50) Bad Neuenahr-Ahrweiler, West Germany

Cycling career
- Sport: Cycling
- Current team: British Cycling
- Discipline: Track
- Role: Coach
- Rider type: Sprinter
Medal record
Representing Germany
Men's track cycling
World Championships
Gold medal – first place	1995 Bogotá	Team sprint
Gold medal – first place	2000 Manchester	Sprint
Silver medal – second place	1997 Perth	Team sprint
Bronze medal – third place	1996 Manchester	1 km time trial

Jan van Eijden (born 10 August 1976) is a German track cyclist born in Bad Neuenahr. He is a double World Champion in sprint and team sprint. He also won one world cup classic and four German national titles.

He retired from active racing in 2006 and worked as a sprint coach for the Great Britain Cycling Team until November 2021.

== Major results ==
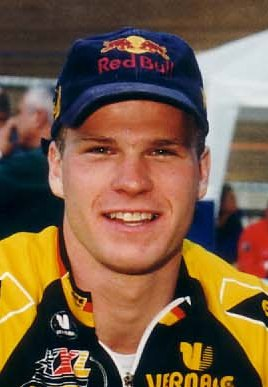

- 1994: 1st in UCI Track World Championships - 1 km time trial (juniors)
- 1995: 1st in UCI Track Cycling World Championships - team sprint
- 1996: 3rd in UCI Track World Championships - 1 km time trial
- 1997: 3rd in German national track cycling championships - sprint
- 1997: 2nd in UCI Track World Championships - team sprint
- 1999: 1st in German national track cycling championships - team sprint
- 1999: 3rd in German national track cycling championships - sprint
- 2000: 1st in UCI Track World Championships - sprint
- 2000: 1st in German national track cycling championships - sprint
- 2000: 1st in German national track cycling championships - team sprint
- 2000: 2nd in German national track cycling championships - keirin
- 2002: 3rd in German national track cycling championships - keirin
- 2003: 2nd in World cup classic Aguascalientes - keirin
- 2003: 3rd in World cup classic Cape Town - sprint
- 2003: 2nd in German national track cycling championships - team sprint
- 2003: 2nd in German national track cycling championships - sprint
- 2004: 2nd in World cup classic Aguascalientes - keirin
- 2004: 3rd in World cup classic Aguascalientes - team sprint
- 2004: 3rd in World cup classic Manchester - sprint
- 2004: 2nd in German national track cycling championships - keirin
- 2004: 1st in German national track cycling championships - sprint
- 2005: 1st in World cup classic Moscow - team sprint
- 2005: 2nd in German national track cycling championships - keirin
- 2005: 2nd in German national track cycling championships - team sprint
- 2006: 3rd in World cup classic Sydney - keirin
