= Grzegorz Krejner =

Polish cyclist

Personal information
- Born: 25 February 1969 (age 57) Żyrardów, Poland
- Height: 6 ft 2 in (188 cm)
- Weight: 212 lb (96 kg)

Cycling career
- Sport: Cycling
- Discipline: Track
- Role: Rider
- Rider type: Sprinter
Medal record
Representing Poland
Men's track cycling
World Championships
Bronze medal – third place	2001 Antwerp	1km time trial

Grzegorz Krejner (born 25 February 1969) is a Polish former track cyclist. He competed at four Olympic Games, including Barcelona 1992, Atlanta 1996, Sydney 2000, and Athens 2004.
