= Andrea Collinelli =

Italian cyclist

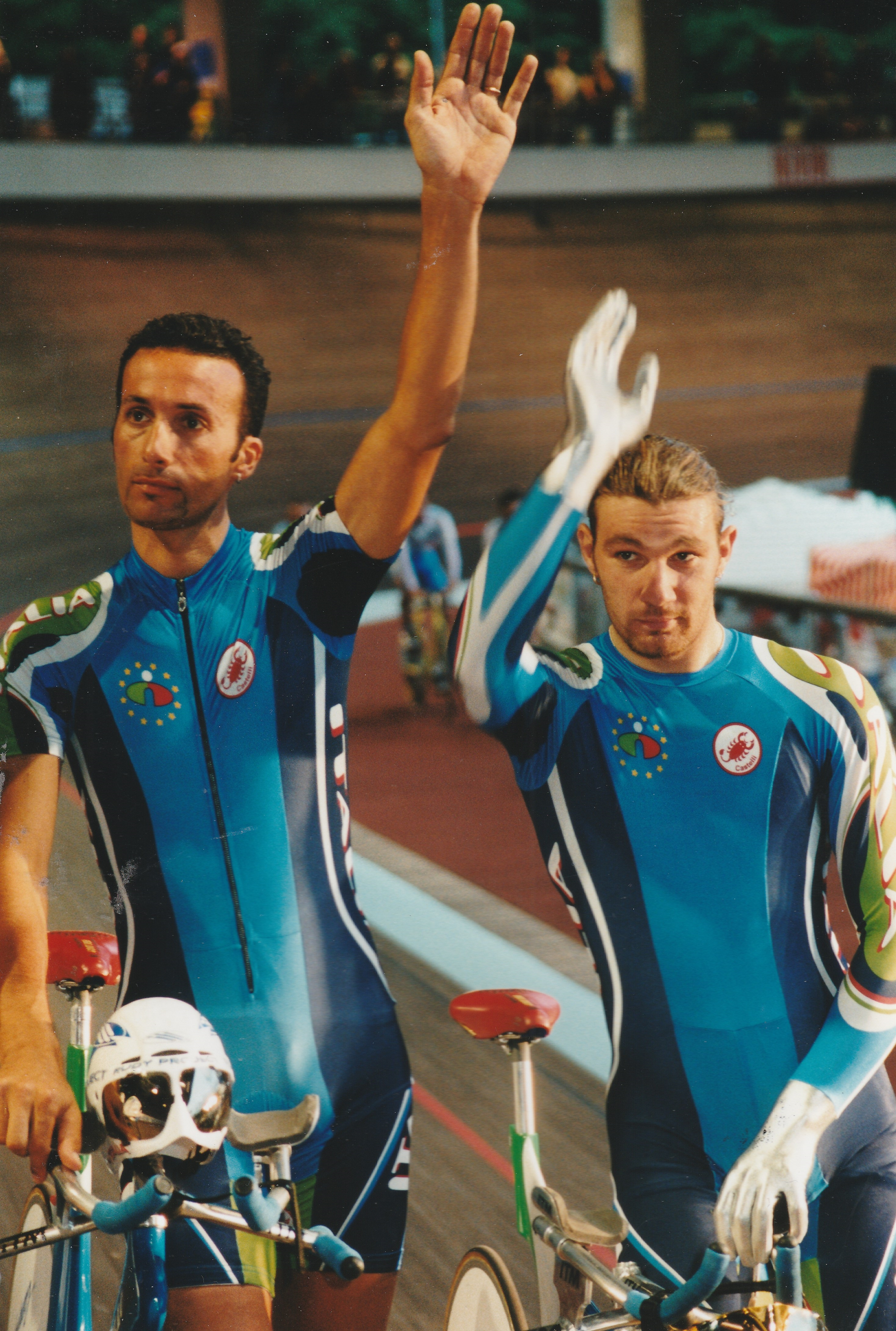
- Colinelli (left) with Mauro Trentin

Personal information
- Born: 2 July 1969 (age 57) Ravenna,

Cycling career
- Sport: Cycling
- Discipline: Track
- Role: Rider
- Rider type: Pursuit
Medal record
Men's track cycling
Representing Italy
Olympic Games
Gold medal – first place	1996 Atlanta	Individual pursuit
World Championships
Gold medal – first place	1996 Manchester	Team pursuit
Gold medal – first place	1997 Perth	Team pursuit
Silver medal – second place	1995 Bogota	Individual pursuit
Silver medal – second place	1996 Manchester	Individual pursuit
Silver medal – second place	1998 Bordeaux	Madison
Bronze medal – third place	1997 Perth	Individual pursuit
Bronze medal – third place	1998 Bordeaux	Team pursuit

Andrea Collinelli (born 2 July 1969) is an Italian former racing cyclist and Olympic champion in track cycling.

== Biography ==
He received a gold medal in 4000m individual pursuit at the 1996 Summer Olympics in Atlanta.
