= 2003 UCI Track Cycling World Cup Classics =

Track cycling tournament organized by UCI

The 2003 UCI Track Cycling World Cup Classics is a multi race tournament over a season of track cycling. The season ran from 14 February 2003 to 18 May 2003. The World Cup is organised by the UCI.

== Results ==
=== Men ===
| Event | Winner | Second | Third |
Russia, Moscow — February 14–16, 2003
| Keirin | René Wolff (GER) | Josiah Ng (MAS) | Ivan Vrba (CZE) |
| 1 km time trial | Stefan Nimke (GER) | Theo Bos (NED) | Grzegorz Krejner (POL) |
| Scratch | Robert Slippens (NED) | Alex Rasmussen (DEN) | Franck Perque (FRA) |
| Individual pursuit | Sergi Escobar Roure (ESP) | Jens Lehmann (GER) | Volodymyr Dyudya (UKR) |
| Team pursuit | Russia; Alexey Markov; Alexander Serov; Sergey Klimov; Nikita Eskov | Germany; Jens Lehmann; Guido Fulst; Sebastian Siedler; Christian Bach | Ukraine; Volodymyr Dyudya; Roman Kononenko; Sergiy Chernyavskyy; Volodymyr Zagorodny |
| Sprint | Laurent Gané (FRA) | Pavel Buráň (CZE) | Jaroslav Jeřábek (SVK) |
| Points race | Matthew Gilmore (BEL) | Juan Llaneras Rosello (ESP) | Mikhail Ignatiev (RUS) |
| Team sprint | Spain; José Antonio Villanueva; José Antonio Escuredo; Salvador Meliá Mangriñan | Poland; Grzegorz Krejner; Łukasz Kwiatkowski; Grzegorz Trebski | Japan; Yuichiro Kamiyama; Tomohiro Nagatsuka; Toshiaki Fushimi |
| Madison | Germany; Guido Fulst; Andreas Müller | Netherlands; Robert Slippens; Danny Stam | Denmark; Jimmy Hansen; Alex Rasmussen |
Mexico, Aguascalientes — March 21–23, 2003
| Keirin | Keiichiro Yaguchi (JPN) | Jan van Eijden (GER) | Jarosiav Jerabek (SVK) |
| 1 km time trial | Jamie Staff (GBR) | Sören Lausberg (GER) | Wilson Meneses (COL) |
| Scratch | Miguel Alzamora (ESP) | Franco Marvulli (SUI) | Walter Fernando Pérez (ARG) |
| Individual pursuit | Vasil Kiryienka (BLR) | Hayden Godfrey (NZL) | Paul Manning (GBR) |
| Team pursuit | Colombia; Alexander González; José Serpa; Carlos Alzate; Juan Pablo Forero | Great Britain; Bryan Steel; Tony Gibb; Paul Manning; Stephen Cummings | Belarus; Siarhei Daubniuk; Yauhen Sobal; Viktar Rapinski; Vasil Kiryienka |
| Sprint | Mark French (AUS) | Jamie Staff (GBR) | Arnaud Duble (FRA) |
| Points race | Leonardo Duque (COL) | Juan Curuchet (ARG) | Chris Newton (GBR) |
| Team sprint | France; Arnaud Duble; Matthieu Mandard; François Pervis | Slovakia; Jarosiav Jerabek; Peter Bazálik; Jan Lepka | Germany; Sören Lausberg; Jan van Eijden; Matthías John |
| Madison | Argentina; Juan Curuchet; Walter Fernando Pérez | Spain; Juan Llaneras; Miguel Alzamora | France; Franck Perque; Jérôme Neuville |
South Africa, Cape Town — April 11–13, 2003
| Keirin | José Antonio Escuredo (ESP) | Martin Benjamin (NED) | Peter Bazálik (SVK) |
| 1 km time trial | Chris Hoy (GBR) | Stefan Nimke (GER) | Shane Kelly (AUS) |
| Scratch | Alexander Äschbach (SUI) | Jean-Pierre van Zyl (RSA) | Jeroen Straathof (NED) |
| Individual pursuit | Luke Roberts (AUS) | Jérôme Neuville (FRA) | Sergi Escobar Roure (ESP) |
| Team pursuit | Ukraine; Alexander Symonenko; Volodymyr Zagorodny; Volodymyr Dyudya; Vitaliy Popkov | Great Britain; Bryan Steel; Tony Gibb; Paul Manning; Kieran Page | Australia; Luke Roberts; Peter Dawson; Mark Jamieson; Ashley Hutchinson |
| Sprint | Mickaël Bourgain (FRA) | Janoslav Jerabek (SVK) | Jan van Eijden (GER) |
| Points race | Mark Renshaw (AUS) | Andreas Müller (GER) | Franck Perque (FRA) |
| Team sprint | Great Britain; Chris Hoy; Jamie Staff; Jason Queally | Germany; Carsten Bergemann; Matthias John; Stefan Nimke | Australia; Ryan Bayley; Mark French; Shane Kelly |
| Madison | Argentina; Walter Fernando Pérez; Juan Curuchet | Switzerland; Alexander Äschbach; Franco Marvulli | Spain; Isaac Gálvez Lopez; Juan Llaneras Rosello |
Australia, Sydney — May 16–18, 2003
| Keirin | Jens Fiedler (GER) | Toshiaki Fushimi (JPN) | Ryan Bayley (AUS) |
| 1 km time trial | Shane Kelly (AUS) | Mathieu Mandard (FRA) | Wilson Meneses (COL) |
| Scratch | Greg Henderson (NZL) | Roland Garber (AUT) | Andreas Müller (GER) |
| Individual pursuit | Mark Jamieson (AUS) | Hayden Godfrey (NZL) | Guido Fulst (GER) |
| Team pursuit | New Zealand; Heath Blackgrove; Hayden Godfrey; Marc Ryan; Lee Vertongen | Germany; Marc Altmann; Guido Fulst; Leif Lampater; Andreas Müller | Australia; Mark Jamieson; Bradley Norton; Chris Pascoe; Chris Sutton |
| Sprint | René Wolff (GER) | Mark French (AUS) | Ross Edgar (GBR) |
| Points race | Mikhail Ignatiev (RUS) | Volodymyr Rybin (UKR) | Greg Henderson (NZL) |
| Team sprint | Japan; Toshiaki Fushimi; Kiyofumi Nagai; Tomohiro Nagatsuka | Australia; Ryan Bayley; Mark French; Shane Kelly | Germany; Jens Fiedler; Michael Seidenbecher; René Wolff |
| Madison | Germany; Guido Fulst; Andreas Müller | Australia; Rodney Mcgee; Darren Young | Netherlands; Gideon de Jong; Geert Jan Jonkman |

=== Women ===
| Event | Winner | Second | Third |
Russia, Moscow — February 14–16, 2003
| Keirin | Svetlana Grankovskaya (RUS) | Clara Sanchez (FRA) | Celine Nivert (FRA) |
| 500 m time trial | Natallia Tsylinskaya (BLR) | Yonghua Jiang (CHN) | Katrin Meinke (GER) |
| Scratch | Lyudmyla Vypyraylo (UKR) | Juliette Vandeckerchove (FRA) | Adrie Visser (NED) |
| Individual pursuit | Katherine Bates (AUS) | Svetlana Ivahonenkava (BLR) | Olga Slussareva (RUS) |
| Sprint | Natallia Tsylinskaya (BLR) | Svetlana Grankovskaia (RUS) | Katrin Meinke (GER) |
| Points race | Olga Slussareva (RUS) | Adrie Visser (NED) | Lyudmyla Vypyraylo (UKR) |
| Team sprint | Russia; Svetlana Grankovskaya; Tamilla Abassova; Oksana Grichina | Ukraine; Irina Yanovich; Lyudmyla Vypyraylo; Sofiya Prychshepa | Germany; Katrin Meinke; Susan Panzer; Christina Becker |
Mexico, Aguascalientes — March 21–23, 2003
| Keirin | Celine Nivert (FRA) | Na Li (CHN) | Tanya Lindenmuth (USA) |
| 500 m time trial | Natallia Tsylinskaya (BLR) | Nancy Contreras (MEX) | Tanya Lindenmuth (USA) |
| Scratch | Elena Chalykh (RUS) | Eleonora Soldo (ITA) | Belem Guerrero (MEX) |
| Individual pursuit | Sarah Ulmer (NZL) | Erin Mirabella (USA) | Rasa Mažeikytė (LTU) |
| Sprint | Natallia Tsylinskaya (BLR) | Tanya Lindenmuth (USA) | Nancy Contreras (MEX) |
| Points race | Elena Chalykh (RUS) | Belem Guerrero (MEX) | Vera Koedooder (NED) |
| Team sprint | Russia; Elena Chalykh; Oxana Grishina; Yulia Arustamova | Netherlands; Anouska van der Zee; Yvonne Hijgenaar; Vera Koedooder | Only two entrants |
South Africa, Cape Town — April 11–13, 2003
| Keirin | Daniela Larreal (VEN) | Katrin Meinke (GER) | Diana García (COL) |
| 500 m time trial | Nancy Contreras (MEX) | Natallia Tsylinskaya (BLR) | Cuihua Jiang (CHN) |
| Scratch | Yulia Arustamova (RUS) | Gema Pascual Torrecilla (ESP) | Alison Wright (AUS) |
| Individual pursuit | Karin Thürig (SUI) | Christina Becker (GER) | Gema Pascual Torrecilla (ESP) |
| Sprint | Svetlana Grankovskaya (RUS) | Katrin Meinke (GER) | Cuihua Jiang (CHN) |
| Points race | Svetlana Ivakhonenkova (BLR) | Vera Carrara (ITA) | Cathy Moncassin (FRA) |
| Team sprint | Germany; Katrin Meinke; Kathrin Freitag; Susan Panzer | Russia; Svetlana Grankovskaya; Yulia Arustamova; Tamilla Abassova | Australia; Kerrie Meares; Anna Meares; Rochelle Gilmore |
Australia, Sydney — May 16–18, 2003
| Keirin | Rosealee Hubbard (AUS) | Kerrie Meares (AUS) | Christin Muche (GER) |
| 500 m time trial | Nancy Contreras (MEX) | Yonghua Jiang (CHN) | Yvonne Hijgenaar (NED) |
| Scratch | Victoria Pendleton (GBR) | Rochelle Gilmore (AUS) | Sarah Ulmer (NZL) |
| Individual pursuit | Sarah Ulmer (NZL) | Diana Žiliūtė (LTU) | Amy Safe (AUS) |
| Sprint | Nancy Contreras (MEX) | Victoria Pendleton (GBR) | Lori-Ann Muenzer (CAN) |
| Points race | Vera Carrara (ITA) | Marion Clignet (FRA) | Sarah Ulmer (NZL) |
| Team sprint | Australia; Rochelle Gilmore; Rosealee Hubbard; Kerrie Meares | Russia; Tamilla Abassova; Yulia Arustamova; Oxana Grishina | Ukraine; Sofiya Pryshchepa; Lyudmyla Vypyraylo; Iryna Yanovych |
