= 2001 UCI Track Cycling World Cup Classics =

International track cycling competition

The 2001 UCI Track Cycling World Cup Classics is a multi race tournament over a season of track cycling. The season ran from 25 May 2001 to 26 August 2001. The World Cup is organised by the UCI.

== Results ==
=== Men ===
Event	Winner	Second	Third
Colombia, Cali — 25–27 May
Individual pursuit	Stefan Steinweg (GER)	Hayden Godfrey (NZL)	Damien Pommereau (FRA)
1 km time trial	Chris Hoy (GBR)	Hervé Robert Thuet (FRA)	Carsten Bergemann (GER)
Points race	Gregory Henderson (NZL)	Leonardo Duque (COL)	Robert Sassone (FRA)
Sprint	Laurent Gané (FRA)	Matthias John (GER)	José Antonio Villanueva (ESP)
Team pursuit	New Zealand; Hayden Godfrey; Gregory Henderson; Matthew Randall; Lee Maxwell Vertongen	Colombia; Arles Castro; Leonardo Duque; Víctor Herrera; José Serpa	Spain; Francisco Javier Carrion; Sergio Escobar; Cristobal Forcadell; Asier Maeztu
Keirin	Laurent Gané (FRA)	Jens Fiedler (GER)	Labros Vasilopoulos (GRE)
Team sprint	Germany; Carsten Bergemann; Jens Fiedler; Matthias John	France; Mickaël Bourgain; Laurent Gané; Hervé Robert Thuet	Great Britain; Chris Hoy; Alwyn Mcmath; Andrew Slater
Madison	Germany; Stefan Steinweg; Erik Weispfennig	Argentina; Juan Curuchet; Edgardo Simón	Switzerland; Alexander Äschbach; Franco Marvulli
Poland, Szczecin — 8–10 June
Individual pursuit	Jens Lehmann (GER)	Alexander Symonenko (UKR)	Alexei Markov (RUS)
Points	Franz Stocher (AUT)	Vasyl Yakovlev (UKR)	Milan Kadlec (CZE)
Sprint	Roberto Chiappa (ITA)	Pavel Buráň (CZE)	Viesturs Berzins (LAT)
Team pursuit	Germany; Christian Bach; Jens Lehmann; Andreas Müller; Sébastian Siedler	Great Britain; Paul Manning; Bryan Steel; Phillip West; Bradley Wiggins	Ukraine; Sergiy Chernyavsky; Aleksander Kliemienko; Roman Kononenko; Alexander Symonenko
Keirin	Pavel Buráň (CZE)	Jaroslav Jeřábek (SVK)	Viesturs Berzins (LAT)
Team sprint	Poland; Grzegorz Krejner; Łukasz Kwiatkowski; Marcin Mientki	Ukraine; Sergiy Ruban; Igor Troyanovsky; Andrei Vynokurov	Germany; Stefan Nimke; Eyk Pokorny; René Wolff
Madison	Switzerland; Alexander Äschbach; Franco Marvulli	Netherlands; Robert Slippens; Danny Stam	Austria; Roland Garber; Franz Stocher
1 km time trial	Teun Mulder (NED)	Stefan Nimke (GER)	Andrei Vynokurov (UKR)
Italy, Pordenone — 29 June–1 July
Individual pursuit	Thomas Liese (GER)	Bradley Wiggins (GBR)	Ruslan Pidgornyy (UKR)
1 km time trial	Sören Lausberg (GER)	Marty Nothstein (USA)	Hervé Robert Thuet (FRA)
Points race	Ho-Sung Cho (KOR)	Devid Garbelli (ITA)	Olexandr Fedenko (UKR)
Sprint	Laurent Gané (FRA)	Mickaël Bourgain (FRA)	Ainārs Ķiksis (LAT)
Team pursuit	Ukraine; Ruslan Pidgorniy; Uleksandr Fedenko; Borys Gapych; Sergiy Chernyavskyy	Great Britain	Australia
Keirin	Ainārs Ķiksis (LAT)	Yuji Yamada (JPN)	Marty Nothstein (USA)
Team sprint	Spain; Aguilar; José Antonio Escuredo; Salvador Meliá	Poland; Krejner; Zieliński; Mientki	Italy; Brossa; Roberto Chiappa; McFarlane
Madison	Cancelled		
Mexico, Mexico — 10–12 August
Individual pursuit	Damien Pommereau (FRA)	Sergio Escobar (ESP)	Alexei Markov (RUS)
1 km time trial	Arnaud Tournant (FRA)	Mark Renshaw (AUS)	Grzegorz Krejner (POL)
Points race	Robert Sassone (FRA)	Marco Arriagada (CHI)	Joan Llaneras (ESP)
Sprint	Roberto Chiappa (ITA)	Jeffrey Labauve (USA)	Arnaud Duble (FRA)
Team pursuit	Russia; Alexei Markov; Vladislav Borisov; Vladimir Karpets; Alexander Serov	Netherlands	Chile
Keirin	José Antonio Villanueva (ESP)	Grzegorz Krejner (POL)	Craig MacLean (GBR)
Team sprint	France; Mickaël Bourgain; Arnaud Duble; Arnaud Tournant	Japan; Takahiro Ara; Koji Hamada; Keichi Omori	United States; Jeffrey Labauve; Giddeon Massie; Joshua Weir
Madison	Spain	Russia	Netherlands
Malaysia, Ipoh — 24–26 August
Individual pursuit	Franco Marvulli (SUI)	Noriyuki Iijima (JPN)	Vadim Kravchenko (KAZ)
1 km time trial	Stefan Nimke (GER)	Mark Renshaw (AUS)	Hervé Gane (FRA)
Points race	Matthew Gilmore (BEL)	Jimmi Madsen (DEN)	James Carney (USA)
Sprint	Jobie Dajka (AUS)	Matthias John (GER)	René Wolff (GER)
Team pursuit	Germany; Marc Altman; Leif Lampater; Christian Müller; Bernhard Wachter	Czech Republic; Blaha; Hlavac; Kesl; Kozuvek	Kazakhstan
Keirin	Jobie Dajka (AUS)	Florian Rousseau (FRA)	Marty Nothstein (USA)
Team sprint	Germany; Matthias John; Stefan Nimke; Rene Wolff	France; Florian Rousseau; Jérôme Hubschwerlin; Hervé Gané	Japan; Nagai Kifoyumi; Kaneko Takashi; Sano Umezaku
Madison	Switzerland; Franco Marvulli; Alexander Äschbach	United States; James Carney; Colby Pearce	Belgium; Matthew Gilmore; Wouter van Mechelen
Final standings
Individual pursuit	Damien Pommereau (FRA)	Sergio Escobar (ESP)	Alexei Markov (RUS)
1 km time trial	Mark Renshaw (AUS)	Stefan Nimke (GER)	Hervé Robert Thuet (FRA)
Points race	James Carney (USA)	Robert Sassone (FRA)	Franz Stocher (AUT)
Sprint	Roberto Chiappa (ITA) shared with Laurent Gané (FRA)		Mickaël Bourgain (FRA)
Team pursuit	Germany	Great Britain shared with Ukraine	
Keirin	Pavel Buráň (CZE)	Josiah Ng (MAS) shared with Marty Nothstein (USA)	
Team sprint	Germany shared with France		Japan
Madison	Switzerland	Spain	United States

=== Women ===
Event	Winner	Second	Third
Colombia, Cali — 25–27 May
Sprint	Natalia Markovnichenko (BLR)	Svetlana Grankovskaia (RUS)	Tanya Lindenmuth (USA)
Individual pursuit	María Luisa Calle (COL)	Emma Davies (GBR)	Elena Tchalykh (RUS)
Points race	Belem Guerrero (MEX)	Teodora Ruano (ESP)	Katherine Bates (AUS)
500 m time trial	Natalia Markovnichenko (BLR)	Nancy Contreras (MEX)	Svetlana Grankovskaia (RUS)
Poland, Szczecin — 8–10 June
Sprint	Natalia Markovnichenko (BLR)	Svetlana Grankovskaia (RUS)	Oksana Grichina (RUS)
Individual pursuit	Leontien van Moorsel (NED)	Katherine Bates (AUS)	Lada Kozlíková (CZE)
Points race	Leontien van Moorsel (NED)	Katherine Bates (AUS)	Mirella van Melis (NED)
500 m time trial	Natalia Markovnichenko (BLR)	Katrin Meinke (GER)	Lori-Ann Muenzer (CAN)
Italy, Pordenone — 29 June–1 July
Sprint	Natalia Markovnichenko (BLR)	Svetlana Grankovskaia (RUS)	Oksana Grichina (RUS)
Individual pursuit	Olga Slioussareva (RUS)	Anouska van der Zee (NED)	Alison Wright (AUS)
Points race	Olga Slioussareva (RUS)	Rochelle Gilmore (AUS)	Anke Wichmann (GER)
500 m time trial	Natalia Markovnichenko (BLR)	Irina Janovich (UKR)	Oksana Grichina (RUS)
Mexico, Mexico — 10–12 August
Sprint	Nancy Contreras (MEX)	Tammy Thomas (USA)	Céline Nivert (FRA)
Individual pursuit	Sarah Ulmer (NZL)	Anouska van der Zee (NED)	Erin Mirabella (USA)
Points race	Belem Guerrero (MEX)	Anouska van der Zee (NED)	Erin Mirabella (USA)
500 m time trial	Nancy Contreras (MEX)	Tammy Thomas (USA)	Lori-Ann Muenzer (CAN)
Malaysia, Ipoh — 24–26 August
Sprint	Lori-Ann Muenzer (CAN)	Kerrie Meares (AUS)	Katrin Meinke (GER)
Individual pursuit	Christina Becker (GER)	Diana Žiliūtė (LTU)	Katherine Bates (AUS)
Points race	Christina Becker (GER)	Cathy Moncassin (FRA)	Erin Carter (CAN)
500 m time trial	Lori-Ann Muenzer (CAN)	Katrin Meinke (GER)	Yan Wang (CHN)
Final standings
Sprint	Natalia Markovnichenko (BLR)	Svetlana Grankovskaia (RUS)	Susann Panzer (GER)
Individual pursuit	Katherine Bates (AUS)	Erin Mirabella (USA)	Anouska van der Zee (NED)
Points race	Belem Guerrero (MEX)	Katherine Bates (AUS)	Erin Mirabella (USA)
500 m time trial	Natalia Markovnichenko (BLR)	Nancy Contreras (MEX)	Lori-Ann Muenzer (CAN)
