= 2004 UCI Track Cycling World Cup Classics =

International track cycling competition

The 2004 UCI Track Cycling World Cup Classics is a multi race tournament over a season of track cycling. The season ran from 17 February 2004 to 16 May 2004. The World Cup is organised by the UCI.

== Results ==
=== Men ===
| Event | Winner | Second | Third |
Russia, Moscow — February 13–15, 2004
| Keirin | Jens Fiedler (GER) | Jobie Dajka (AUS) | Pavel Buráň (CZE) |
| 1 km time trial | Theo Bos (NED) | Jason Queally (GBR) | Carsten Bergemann (GER) |
| Scratch | Walter Pérez (ARG) | Volodymyr Rybin (UKR) | Chris Newton (GBR) |
| Individual pursuit | Robert Bartko (GER) | Volodymyr Dyudya (UKR) | Alexei Markov (RUS) |
| Team pursuit | Lithuania; Raimondas Vilčinskas; Aivaras Baranauskas; Linas Balčiūnas; Tomas Vaitkus | Ukraine; Volodymyr Dyudya; Roman Kononenko; Vitaliy Popkov; Volodymyr Zagorodniy | Russia; Oleg Grishkine; Alexander Khatuntsev; Alexei Markov; Alexey Shmidt |
| Sprint | Jens Fiedler (GER) | René Wolff (GER) | Theo Bos (NED) |
| Points race | Marco Antonio Arriagada (CHI) | Milton Wynants (URU) | Juan Esteban Curuchet (ARG) |
| Team sprint | Germany; René Wolff; Jens Fiedler; Carsten Bergemann | Great Britain; Chris Hoy; Craig MacLean; Jason Queally | Spain; José Antonio Escuredo; Salvador Meliá; José Antonio Villanueva |
| Madison | Argentina; Juan Esteban Curuchet; Walter Pérez | Austria; Roland Garber; Franz Stocher | Russia; Oleg Grishkine; Serguei Koudentsov |
Mexico, Aguascalientes — March 12–14, 2004
| Keirin | Mickaël Bourgain (FRA) | Jan van Eijden (GER) | José Antonio Escuredo (ESP) |
| 1 km time trial | Stefan Nimke (GER) | Arnaud Tournant (FRA) | Ben Kersten (AUS) |
| Scratch | Colby Pearce (USA) | Greg Henderson (NZL) | Franco Marvulli (SUI) |
| Individual pursuit | Sergi Escobar Roure (ESP) | Fabien Sanchez (FRA) | Fabien Kiryienka (BLR) |
| Team pursuit | France; Anthony Langella; Fabien Merciris; Franck Perque; Fabien Sanchez | New Zealand; Jason Allen; Richard Bowker; Hayden Godfrey; Timothy Gudsell | Spain; Carlos Castaño Panadero; Sergio Roure; Guillermo Garcia (cyclist); Asier Maetzu |
| Sprint | Mickaël Bourgain (FRA) | Laurent Gané (FRA) | Josiah Ng On Lam (MYS) |
| Points race | Juan Esteban Curuchet (ARG) | Franck Perque (FRA) | Angelo Ciccone (ITA) |
| Team sprint | France; Mickaël Bourgain; Laurent Gané; Arnaud Tournant | Japan; Toshiaki Fushimi; Masaki Inoue; Tomohiro Nagatsuka | Germany; Stefan Nimke; Michael Seidenbecher; Jan van Eijden |
| Madison | Ukraine; Volodymyr Rybin; Vasyl Yakovlev | Switzerland; Alexander Äschbach; Franco Marvulli | Austria; Roland Garber; Franz Stocher |
United Kingdom, Manchester — April 9–11, 2004
| Keirin | Shane Kelly (AUS) | Josiah Ng (MYS) | Florian Rousseau (FRA) |
| 1 km time trial | Craig MacLean (GBR) | Theo Bos (NED) | Sören Lausberg (GER) |
| Scratch | Mark Renshaw (AUS) | Franck Perque (FRA) | Rob Hayles (GBR) |
| Individual pursuit | Bradley McGee (AUS) | Sergi Escobar Roure (ESP) | Paul Manning (GBR) |
| Team pursuit | Great Britain; Robert Hayles, Paul Manning, Chris Newton, Bryan Steel | Netherlands; Levi Heimans, Jens Mouris, Peter Schep, Jeroen Straathof | Australia; Ashley Hutchinson, Brett Lancaster, Brad McGee, Stephen Wooldridge |
| Sprint | Damian Zieliński (POL) | Florian Rousseau (FRA) | Jan van Eijden (GER) |
| Points race | Juan Llaneras Rosello (ESP) | Wong Kam-po (HKG) | Colby Pearce (AUS) |
| Team sprint | Great Britain; Craig MacLean; Jamie Staff; Chris Hoy | Netherlands; Jan Bos; Theo Bos; Teun Mulder | France; Grégory Baugé; Florian Rousseau; François Pervis |
| Madison | Czech Republic; Martin Bláha; Petr Lazar | Ukraine; Volodymyr Rybin; Vasyl Yakovlev | Slovakia; Martin Liška; Jozef Žabka |
Australia, Sydney — May 14–16, 2004
| Keirin | Jobie Dajka (AUS) | José Antonio Villanueva (ESP) | Anthony Peden (NZL) |
| 1 km time trial | Chris Hoy (GBR) | Ahmed López (CUB) | Masaki Inoue (JPN) |
| Scratch | Robert Slippens (NED) | Dean Downing (GBR) | Mathieu Ladagnous (FRA) |
| Individual pursuit | Paul Manning (GBR) | Volodymyr Dyudya (UKR) | Levi Heimans (NED) |
| Team pursuit | Great Britain; Robert Hayles; Paul Manning; Russell Downing; Bryan Steel | Netherlands; Levi Heimans; Jens Mouris; Peter Schep; Jeroen Straathof | Germany; Robert Bengsch; Guido Fulst; Christian Lademann; Leif Lampater |
| Sprint | Craig MacLean (GBR) | José Antonio Villanueva (ESP) | Takashi Kaneko (JPN) |
| Points race | Colby Pearce (USA) | Chris Newton (GBR) | Joan Llaneras (ESP) |
| Team sprint | Great Britain; Chris Hoy; Craig MacLean; Jamie Staff | Poland; Rafał Furman; Łukasz Kwiatkowski; Damian Zieliński | Japan; Toshiaki Fushimi; Yuichiro Kamiyama; Tomohiro Nagatsuka |
| Madison | Argentina; Juan Esteban Curuchet; Walter Pérez | Spain; Miguel Alzamora; Joan Llaneras | Switzerland; Franco Marvulli; Bruno Risi |

=== Women ===
| Event | Winner | Second | Third |
Russia, Moscow — February 13–15, 2004
| Keirin | Guo Shuang (CHN) | Katrin Meinke (GER) | Oksana Grichina (RUS) |
| 500 m time trial | Natallia Tsylinskaya (BLR) | Cuihua Jiang (CHN) | Yvonne Hijgenaar (NED) |
| Scratch | Olga Slyusareva (RUS) | Lyudmyla Vypyraylo (UKR) | Giorgia Bronzini (ITA) |
| Individual pursuit | Karin Thürig (SUI) | Olga Slyusareva (RUS) | Hanka Kupfernagel (GER) |
| Sprint | Svetlana Grankovskaia (RUS) | Natallia Tsylinskaya (BLR) | Tamilla Abassova (RUS) |
| Points race | Olga Slyusareva (RUS) | Belem Guerrero Méndez (MEX) | Yoanka González Pérez (CUB) |
| Team sprint | Russia; Svetlana Grankovskaia; Oksana Grichina | France; Céline Nivert; Clara Sanchez | Netherlands; Yvonne Hijgenaar; Willy Kanis |
Mexico, Aguascalientes — March 12–14, 2004
| Keirin | Simona Krupeckaitė (LTU) | Jennie Reed (USA) | Anna Meares (AUS) |
| 500 m time trial | Natallia Tsylinskaya (BLR) | Anna Meares (AUS) | Yvonne Hijgenaar (NED) |
| Scratch | Elena Tchalykh (RUS) | Gema Pascual Torrecilla (ESP) | Sarah Ulmer (NZL) |
| Individual pursuit | Sarah Ulmer (NZL) | Elena Tchalykh (RUS) | Emma Davies (GBR) |
| Sprint | Natallia Tsylinskaya (BLR) | Tanya Lindenmuth (USA) | Simona Krupeckaitė (LTU) |
| Points race | Erin Mirabella (USA) | Lada Kozlíková (CZE) | Yoanka González (CUB) |
| Team sprint | Australia; Rosealee Hubbard; Anna Meares | France; Celine Nivert; Clara Sanchez | Netherlands; Yvonne Hijgenaar; Willy Kanis |
United Kingdom, Manchester — April 9–11, 2004
| Keirin | Jennie Reed (USA) | Susan Panzer (GER) | Daniela Larreal (VEN) |
| 500 m time trial | Yvonne Hijgenaar (NED) | Yonghua Jiang (CHN) | Victoria Pendleton (GBR) |
| Scratch | Alison Wright (AUS) | Rochelle Gilmore (AUS) | Rebecca Quinn (USA) |
| Individual pursuit | Katherine Bates (AUS) | Emma Davies (GBR) | Hanka Kupfernagel (GER) |
| Sprint | Victoria Pendleton (GBR) | Irina Yanovych (UKR) | Susan Panzer (GER) |
| Points race | Katherine Bates (AUS) | Hanka Kupfernagel (GER) | Belem Guerrero Méndez (MEX) |
| Team sprint | Germany; Katrin Meinke; Susan Panzer | France; Celine Nivert; Clara Sanchez | Australia; Rosealee Hubbard; Kristine Bayley |
Australia, Sydney — May 14–16, 2004
| Keirin | Guo Shuang (CHN) | Jennie Reed (USA) | Katrin Meinke (GER) |
| 500 m time trial | Yvonne Hijgenaar (NED) | Lori-Ann Muenzer (CAN) | Clara Sanchez (FRA) |
| Scratch | Adrie Visser (NED) | Gu Sun-Geun (KOR) | Rebecca Quinn (USA) |
| Individual pursuit | Sarah Ulmer (NZL) | Karin Thürig (SUI) | Alexis Rhodes (AUS) |
| Sprint | Anna Meares (AUS) | Tanya Lindenmuth (USA) | Lori-Ann Muenzer (CAN) |
| Points race | Alexis Rhodes (AUS) | Lyudmyla Vypyraylo (UKR) | Sarah Ulmer (NZL) |
| Team sprint | Germany; Kathrin Freitag; Katrin Meinke | Australia; Rebecca Ellis; Rosealee Hubbard | Russia; Oxana Grishina; Anastasia Chulkova |
