= 2002 UCI Track Cycling World Cup Classics =

International track cycling competition

The 2002 UCI Track Cycling World Cup Classics is a multi race tournament over a season of track cycling. The season ran from 19 April 2002 to 11 August 2002. The World Cup is organised by the UCI.

== Results ==
=== Men ===
Event	Winner	Second	Third
Mexico, Monterrey — April 19–21, 2002
Keirin	José Antonio Escuredo (ESP)	Domenico Mei (ITA)	Josiah Ng Onn Lam (MAS)
1 km time trial	Arnaud Tournant (FRA)	José Antonio Escuredo (ESP)	Grzegorz Krejner (POL)
Scratch	Franco Marvulli (SUI)	Robert Slippens (NED)	James Carney (USA)
Individual pursuit	Paul Manning (GBR)	SERGI ESCOBAR (ESP)	Volodymyr Dyudya (UKR)
Team pursuit	Belarus; Dzmitry Aulasenka; Vasil Kiryienka; Viktar Rapinski; Yauhen Sobal	Great Britain; Russel Anderson; Tim Buckle; Stephen Cummings; Paul Manning	Netherlands; Jens Mouris; Peter Schep; Robert Slippens; Wilco Zuijderwijk
Sprint	René Wolff (GER)	Julio César Herrera (CUB)	Matthias John (GER)
Points race	Milton Wynants (URU)	Leonardo Duque (COL)	Juan Curuchet (ARG)
Team sprint	France; Franck Durivaux; Arnaud Duble; Arnaud Tournant	Germany; Carsten Bergemann; Matthias John; René Wolff	Poland; Łukasz Kwiatkowski; Grzegorz Krejner; Damian Zieliński
Madison	Spain; Miguel Alzamora; Juan Llaneras	Argentina; Juan Curuchet; Edgardo Simón	Switzerland; Alexander Äschbach; Franco Marvulli
Australia, Sydney — May 10–12, 2002
Keirin	Sean Eadie (AUS)	Josiah Ng Onn Lam (MAS)	Alwyn McMath (GBR)
1 km time trial	Chris Hoy (GBR)	Ben Kersten (AUS)	Garren Bloch (RSA)
Scratch	Robert Slippens (NED)	Jame Carney (USA)	Leonardo Duque (COL)
Individual pursuit	Peter Dawson (AUS)	Hayden Roulston (NZL)	Stefan Steinweg (GER)
Team pursuit	New Zealand; Hayden Roulston; Greg Henderson; Matthew Randall; Lee Vertongen	Australia; Peter Dawson; Stephen Wooldridge; Rod McGee; Mark Renshaw	Greece; Ioannis Tsakouridis; Vasilos Gianniosis; Elpidoforos Potouridis; Kostas Rodopoulos
Sprint	Sean Eadie (AUS)	Arnaud Tournant (FRA)	Mickeal Bourgain (FRA)
Points race	Mark Renshaw (AUS)	Jean-Pierre van Zyl (RSA)	Greg Henderson (NZL)
Team sprint	Great Britain; Chris Hoy; Alwyn McMath; Andy Slater	France; Arnaud Tournant; Mickaël Bourgain; Arnaud Duble	Greece; Lampros Vasilopoulos; Kleanthis Bargas; Dimitris Georgalis
Madison	New Zealand; Greg Henderson; Hayden Roulston	Australia; Mark Renshaw; Darren Young	Netherlands; Robert Slippens; Danny Stam
Russia, Moscow — May 31 – June 2, 2002
Keirin	Ainārs Ķiksis (LAT)	Ryan Bayley (AUS)	José Antonio Villanueva (ESP)
1 km time trial	Sören Lausberg (GER)	Andrei Vynokurov (UKR)	Jamie Staff (GBR)
Scratch	Lyubomyr Polatayko (UKR)	Miguel Alzamora (ESP)	Ivan Vrba (CZE)
Individual pursuit	Jens Lehmann (GER)	Luke Roberts (AUS)	Alexei Markov (RUS)
Team pursuit	Russia	Ukraine	Germany
Sprint	René Wolff (GER)	Łukasz Kwiatkowski (POL)	Florian Rousseau (FRA)
Points race	Graeme Brown (AUS)	Sergey Lavrenenko (KAZ)	Makoto Iijima (JPN)
Team sprint	Great Britain; Jamie Staff; Jason Queally; Chris Hoy	Australia; Sean Eadie; Ryan Bayley; Ben Kersten	Germany; Matthias John; Sören Lausberg; René Wolff
Madison	Austria	Switzerland	Australia
Colombia, Cali — June 21–23, 2002
Keirin	Jens Fiedler (GER)	Laurent Gané (FRA)	Peter Bazálik (SVK)
1 km time trial	José Antonio Villanueva (ESP)	Teun Mulder (NED)	Hervé Robert Thuet (FRA)
Scratch	Matthew Gilmore (BEL)	James Carney (USA)	Luis Fernando Sepúlveda (CHI)
Individual pursuit	Tomas Vaitkus (LTU)	Stefan Steinweg (GER)	Fabien Sánchez (FRA)
Team pursuit	Italy; Massimo Strazzer; Maicol Valgiusti; Alessandro Mazzolani; Angelo Ciccone	Lithuania; Tomas Vaitkus; Sergejus Apionkinas; Aivaras Baranauskas; Vytautas Kaupas	Spain; Guillermo Ferrer; Asier Maeztu; Isaac Gálvez; Cristóbal Forcadell
Sprint	Laurent Gané (FRA)	Jens Fiedler (GER)	Jan van Eijden (GER)
Points race	Colby Pearce (USA)	Joan Llaneras (ESP)	Franz Stocher (AUT)
Team sprint	Spain; José Antonio Escuredo; Salvador Meliá; José Antonio Villanueva	Slovakia; Peter Bazálik; Jaroslav Jeřábek; Jan Lepka	Cuba; Julio Herrera; Damian Gainza; Yosmani Poll
Madison	Germany	Australia	United States
China, Kunming — August 9–11, 2002
Keirin	Pavel Buráň (CZE)	Viesturs Berzins (LAT)	Lampros Vasilopoulos (GRE)
1 km time trial	Ahmed López (CUB)	Toshiaki Fushimi (JPN)	Benjamin Martinez (BOL)
Scratch	Ivan Vrba (CZE)	Franco Marvulli (SUI)	Tony Gibb (GBR)
Individual pursuit	Sebastian Siedler (GER)	Mike Tillman (USA)	Lyubomyr Polatayko (UKR)
Team pursuit	Germany	Ukraine	Poland
Sprint	Viesturs Berzins (LAT)	Pavel Buráň (CZE)	Carsten Bergenann (GER)
Points race	Franco Marvulli (SUI)	Colby Pearce (USA)	Volodymyr Rybin (UKR)
Team sprint	Czech Republic	Japan	Greece
Madison	Switzerland; Franco Marvulli; Alexander Äschbach	United States; Michael Tillman; Colby Pearce	Germany; Guido Fulst; Andreas Müller

=== Women ===
Event	Winner	Second	Third
Mexico, Monterrey — April 19–21, 2002
Keirin	Yumari González (CUB)	Katrin Meinke (GER)	Svetlana Grankovskaia (RUS)
500 m time trial	Natalia Markovnichenko (BLR)	Nancy Contreras (MEX)	Katrin Meinke (GER)
Scratch	Erin Mirabella (USA)	Mandy Poitras (CAN)	Belem Guerrero (MEX)
Individual pursuit	Emma Davies (GBR)	Svetlana Ivahonenkava (BLR)	Olga Slioussareva (RUS)
Sprint	Natalia Markovnichenko (BLR)	Svetlana Grankovskaia (RUS)	Tammy Thomas (USA)
Points race	Belem Guerrero (MEX)	Limei Yang (CHN)	Puxiang Zheng (CHN)
Australia, Sydney — May 10–12, 2002
Keirin	Rosealee Hubbard (AUS)	Michelle Ferris (AUS)	Lori-Ann Muenzer (CAN)
500 m time trial	Tanya Lindenmuth (USA)	Julie Paulding (GBR)	Nancy Contreras (MEX)
Scratch	Sarah Ulmer (NZL)	Sarah Hammer (USA)	Cathy Moncassin (FRA)
Individual pursuit	Sarah Ulmer (NZL)	Sara Symington (GBR)	Cathy Moncassin (FRA)
Sprint	Tammy Thomas (USA)	Tanya Lindenmuth (USA)	Lori-Ann Muenzer (CAN)
Points race	Sarah Hammer (USA)	Cathy Moncassin (FRA)	Sarah Ulmer (NZL)
Russia, Moscow — May 31 – June 2, 2002
Keirin	Iryna Yanovych (UKR)	Celine Niver (FRA)	Jennie Reed (USA)
500 m time trial	Natalia Tsylinskaya (BLR)	Tamilla Abassova (RUS)	Jiang Yonghua (CHN)
Scratch	Olga Slioussareva (RUS)	Rochelle Gilmore (AUS)	Rikke Sandhoj Olsen (DEN)
Individual pursuit	Leontien van Moorsel (NED)	Olga Slioussareva (RUS)	Katherine Bates (AUS)
Sprint	Natalia Tsylinskaya (BLR)	Svetlana Grankovskaia (RUS)	Tamilla Abassova (RUS)
Points race	Olga Slioussareva (RUS)	Neringa Raudonyte (LTU)	Katherine Bates (AUS)
Colombia, Cali — June 21–23, 2002
Keirin	Svetlana Grankovskaia (RUS)	Clara Sanchez (FRA)	Daniela Larreal (VEN)
500 m time trial	Tammy Thomas (USA)	Tatiana Malianova (RUS)	Yumari González (CUB)
Scratch	Mandy Poitras (CAN)	Erin Mirabella (USA)	Lada Kozlíková (CZE)
Individual pursuit	Rasa Mažeikytė (LTU)	Lada Kozlíková (CZE)	Erin Mirabella (USA)
Sprint	Svetlana Grankovskaia (RUS)	Tammy Thomas (USA)	Susann Panzer (GER)
Points race	Belem Guerrero (MEX)	Gema Pascual Torrecilla (ESP)	Anke Wichmann (GER)
China, Kunming — August 9–11, 2002
Keirin	Na Li (CHN)	Fang Tian (CHN)	Jennie Reed (USA)
500 m time trial	Yonghua Jiang (CHN)	Kathrin Freitag (GER)	Yvonne Hijgenaar (NED)
Scratch	Elena Tchalykh (RUS)	Lyudmyla Vypyralo (UKR)	Adrie Visser (NED)
Individual pursuit	Elena Tchalykh (RUS)	Amy Safe (AUS)	Christina Becker (GER)
Sprint	Na Li (CHN)	Kathrin Freitag (GER)	Fang Tian (CHN)
Points race	Elena Tchalykh (RUS)	Puxiang Zheng (CHN)	Vera Carrara (ITA)
