= 2004 UCI Track Cycling World Championships – Women's sprint =

Women's sprint at the 2004 UCI Track Cycling World Championships
- Venue: Vodafone Arena
- Location: Melbourne, Australia
- Dates: 28–29 May 2004
- Competitors: 22 from 16 nations

Medalists
gold medal	Svetlana Grankovskaya	Russia
silver medal	Anna Meares	Australia
bronze medal	Lori-Ann Muenzer	Canada

The Women's sprint competition at the 2004 UCI Track Cycling World Championships was held over two days at the Vodafone Arena in Melbourne, Australia. 22 riders from 16 nations competed. The early rounds were raced on 28 May, with the semifinals, finals, and races for minor placings on 29 May.

Svetlana Grankovskaya won her second consecutive sprint world title. After the race she described herself as "very motivated and very driven." Anna Meares won silver, following in the footsteps of her sister Kerrie Meares who won silver in the sprint in 2002.

== Results ==
=== Qualifying ===
Qualifying took place on Friday 28 May 2004, starting at 11:50. The qualifying round was a flying 200m time trial. The top 18 riders who completed qualifying would progress in the competition.

Qualifying results
Rank	Name	Nation	Time	Notes
1	Svetlana Grankovskaya	Russia	11.339	Q
2	Anna Meares	Australia	11.450	Q
3	Simona Krupeckaite	Lithuania	11.452	Q
4	Natallia Tsylinskaya	Belarus	11.462	Q
5	Yvonne Hijgenaar	Netherlands	11.472	Q
6	Lori-Ann Muenzer	Canada	11.527	Q
7	Tamilla Abassova	Russia	11.534	Q
8	Victoria Pendleton	Great Britain	11.559	Q
9	Jennie Reed	United States	11.569	Q
10	Jiang Cuihua	China	11.612	Q
11	Clara Sanchez	France	11.621	Q
12	Tanya Lindenmuth	United States	11.646	Q
13	Jiang Yonghua	China	11.666	Q
14	Susan Panzer	Germany	11.671	Q
15	Daniela Larreal	Venezuela	11.770	Q
16	Elisa Frisoni	Italy	11.840	Q
17	Oxana Grishina	Russia	11.843	Q
18	Katrin Meinke	Germany	11.855	Q
19	Szilvia Szabolcsi	Hungary	11.941	
20	Nancy Contreras	Mexico	11.981	
21	Iryna Yanovych	Ukraine	12.083	
22	Anastasia Tchulkova	Russia	12.264	

=== 1/16 Finals ===
The 1/16 finals took place on Friday 28 May 2004, starting at 13:20. Each heat consisted of a single three-lap race between two riders. Rider who won their heats proceeded to the 1/8 finals, while riders who lost their heats would race again in repechage for another chance to qualify for the 1/8 finals. In heat 5, Susan Panzer received a warning from the commissaires for deliberately riding on the blue band. In heat 9, Jiang Cuihua was disqualified from the competition for causing her opponent to crash.

1/16 Finals results
Heat	Rank	Name	Nation	Notes
1	1	Svetlana Grankovskaya	Russia	Q
1	2	Katrin Meinke	Germany	
2	1	Anna Meares	Australia	Q
2	2	Oxana Grishina	Russia	
3	1	Simona Krupeckaite	Lithuania	Q
3	2	Elisa Frisoni	Italy	
4	1	Natallia Tsylinskaya	Belarus	Q
4	2	Daniela Larreal	Venezuela	
5	1	Yvonne Hijgenaar	Netherlands	Q
5	2	Susan Panzer	Germany	
6	1	Lori-Ann Muenzer	Canada	Q
6	2	Jiang Yonghua	China	
7	1	Tamilla Abassova	Russia	Q
7	2	Tanya Lindenmuth	United States	
8	1	Victoria Pendleton	Great Britain	Q
8	2	Clara Sanchez	France	
9	1	Jennie Reed	United States	Q
9	2	Jiang Cuihua	China	DSQ

=== 1/16 Final Repechage ===
The 1/16 final repechage took place on Friday 28 May 2004, starting at 14:10. Each heat consisted of a single three-lap race between two or three riders, with the winner of each heat proceeding other the 1/8 finals. In heat 2, Susan Panzer was relegated by the commissaires for not holding her line during the final sprint.

1/16 Finals Repechage results
Heat	Rank	Name	Nation	Notes
1	1	Katrin Meinke	Germany	Q
1	2	Jiang Yonghua	China	
1				
2	1	Oxana Grishina	Russia	Q
2	2	Tanya Lindenmuth	United States	
2	3	Susan Panzer	Germany	REL
3	1	Daniela Larreal	Venezuela	Q
3	2	Elisa Frisoni	Italy	
3	3	Clara Sanchez	France	

=== 1/8 Finals ===
The 1/8 finals took place on Friday 28 May 2004, starting at 19:30. Each heat consisted of a single three-lap race between two riders, with winners proceeding to the quarterfinals and losers racing again in repechage.

1/8 Finals results
Heat	Rank	Name	Nation	Notes
1	1	Svetlana Grankovskaya	Russia	Q
1	2	Daniela Larreal	Venezuela	
2	1	Anna Meares	Australia	Q
2	2	Oxana Grishina	Russia	
3	1	Simona Krupeckaite	Lithuania	Q
2	2	Katrin Meinke	Germany	
4	1	Natallia Tsylinskaya	Belarus	Q
4	2	Jennie Reed	United States	
5	1	Victoria Pendleton	Great Britain	Q
5	2	Yvonne Hijgenaar	Netherlands	
6	1	Lori-Ann Muenzer	Canada	Q
6	2	Tamilla Abassova	Russia	

=== 1/8 Finals Repechage ===
The 1/8 finals repechage took place on 28 May 2004, starting at 20:15. The winner of each proceeded to the quarterfinals. During the first heat, Tamilla Abassova was relegated by the commissaires.

1/8 Finals Repechage results
Heat	Rank	Name	Nation	Notes
1	1	Jennie Reed	United States	Q
1	2	Daniela Larreal	Venezuela	
1	3	Tamilla Abassova	Russia	REL
2	1	Oxana Grishina	Russia	Q
2	2	Katrin Meinke	Germany	
2	3	Yvonne Hijgenaar	Netherlands	

=== Quarterfinals ===
The quarterfinals took place on Friday 28 May 2004, starting at 20:45. Each heat was a best-of-three competition between two riders, with riders needing to win two three-lap races to win their heat. Winner would proceed to the semifinals, while losers would race for 5th–8th place. In heat 4, Natallia Tsylinskaya received a warning from the commissaires for deviating from her line during the final sprint. Tsylinskaya also fell in her first race against Pendleton and was unable to finish that race, but she was only bruised and was able to contest the other two races in the heat.

Quarterfinals results
Heat	Rank	Name	Nation	Race 1	Race 2	Decider	Notes
1	1	Svetlana Grankovskaya	Russia	X	X		Q
1	2	Oxana Grishina	Russia				
2	1	Anna Meares	Australia	X	X		Q
2	2	Jennie Reed	United States				
3	1	Lori-Ann Muenzer	Canada		X	X	Q
3	2	Simona Krupeckaite	Lithuania	X			
4	1	Victoria Pendleton	Great Britain	X		X	Q
4	2	Natallia Tsylinskaya	Belarus	DNF	X		

=== Semifinals ===
The semifinals took place on Saturday 29 May 2004, starting at 19:15. Like the quarterfinals, each heat in this round was a best-of-three competition. The winners from this round would go on to compete for the gold medal, and the losers from this round would compete for bronze. Victoria Pendleton was relegated in the second race of heat 1 for entering the sprinter's lane when her opponent was already there.

Semifinals results
Heat	Rank	Name	Nation	Race 1	Race 2	Decider	Notes
1	1	Svetlana Grankovskaya	Russia	X	X		Q
1	2	Victoria Pendleton	Great Britain		REL		
2	1	Anna Meares	Australia		X	X	Q
2	2	Lori-Ann Muenzer	Canada	X			

=== Race for 9th–12th Places ===
The race for 9th–12th place took place on Saturday 29 May 2004, starting at 20:40. This round consisted of a single race between the riders who came second or third in the 1/8 final repechage to establish their overall placings.

Race for 9th–12th place results
Rank	Name	Nation	Notes
9	Yvonne Hijgenaar	Netherlands	
10	Katrin Meinke	Germany	
11	Daniela Larreal	Venezuela	
12	Tamilla Abassova	Russia	

=== Race for 5th–8th Places ===
The race for 5th–8th place took place on Saturday 29 May 2004, starting at 20:45. This round consisted of a single race between the riders who lost their heats in the quarterfinals to establish their final placings.

Race for 5th–8th place results
Rank	Name	Nation	Notes
5	Jennie Reed	United States	
6	Oxana Grishina	Russia	
7	Simona Krupeckaite	Lithuania	
8	Natallia Tsylinskaya	Belarus	DNS

=== Finals ===
The finals took place on Saturday 29 May 2004, starting at 20:50.

Final results
Rank	Name	Nation	Race 1	Race 2	Decider
Gold medal race
1st place, gold medalist(s)	Svetlana Grankovskaya	Russia	X		X
2nd place, silver medalist(s)	Anna Meares	Australia		X	
Bronze medal race
3rd place, bronze medalist(s)	Lori-Ann Muenzer	Canada	X	X	
4	Victoria Pendleton	Great Britain			
