= Cycling at the 2000 Summer Olympics – Women's sprint =

Cycling at the Olympics

Women's cycling sprint at the Games of the XXVII Olympiad
- Venue: Dunc Gray Velodrome
- Date: 18–20 September 2000
- Competitors: 12 from 12 nations

Medalists
1st place, gold medalist(s)		Félicia Ballanger	France
2nd place, silver medalist(s)		Oxana Grichina	Russia
3rd place, bronze medalist(s)		Iryna Yanovych	Ukraine

The women's 200m Sprint at the 2000 Summer Olympics (Cycling) was an event that consisted of cyclists making three laps around the track. Only the time for the last 200 metres of the 750 metres covered was counted as official time. The races were held on Monday, 18 September, Tuesday, 19 September, and Wednesday, 20 September 2000 at the Dunc Gray Velodrome.

== Records ==
World and Olympic records prior to the Games.
World Record	10.831 s	Olga Slioussareva	Russia	Moscow, Russia	25 April 1993
Olympic Record	11.212 s	Michelle Ferris	Australia	Atlanta, USA	24 July 1996

== Medalists ==
Gold:	Silver:	Bronze:
Felicia Ballanger, France	Oxana Grichina, Russia	Iryna Yanovych, Ukraine

== Results ==
- Q denotes qualification by place in heat.
- q denotes qualification by overall place.
- REL denotes relegated- due to being passed
- DNS denotes did not start.
- DNF denotes did not finish.
- DQ denotes disqualification.
- NR denotes national record.
- OR denotes Olympic record.
- WR denotes world record.
- PB denotes personal best.
- SB denotes season best.

=== Qualifying round ===
Held Monday, 18 September.
Times and average speeds are listed. All 12 riders were seeded by these results for the first round.

Pos.	Athlete	NOC	Time	Ave. Speed
1.	Felicia Ballanger	France	11.262 s	63.932 km/h
2.	Oxana Grichina	Russia	11.439 s	62.943 km/h
3.	Tanya Dubnicoff	Canada	11.494 s	62.641 km/h
4.	Michelle Ferris	Australia	11.512 s	62.543 km/h
5.	Daniela Larreal	Venezuela	11.526 s	62.467 km/h
6.	Szilvia Szabolcsi	Hungary	11.545 s	62.365 km/h
7.	Iryna Yanovych	Ukraine	11.548 s	62.348 km/h
8.	Tanya Lindenmuth	United States	11.649 s	61.808 km/h
9.	Yan Wang	China	11.650 s	61.803 km/h
10.	Kathrin Freitag	Germany	11.792 s	61.058; km/h
11.	Fiona Ramage	New Zealand	11.803 s	61.001 km/h
12.	Mira Kasslin	Finland	12.194 s	59.045 km/h

=== 1/8 final ===
Held Monday, 18 September. The 1/8 round consisted of six matches, each pitting two of the twelve cyclists against each other. The winners advanced to the quarterfinals, with the losers getting another chance in the 1/8 repechage.

Heat	Pos	Athlete	NOS	Time	Ave. Speed	Qualify
1	1	Felicia Ballanger	France	12.257 s	58.742 km/h	Q
1	2	Mira Kasslin	Finland			
2	1	Oxana Grichina	Russia	12.195 s	59.041 km/h	Q
2	2	Fiona Ramage	New Zealand			
3	1	Tanya Dubnicoff	Canada	12.414 s	57.999 km/h	Q
3	2	Kathrin Freitag	Germany			
4	1	Michelle Ferris	Australia	12.078 s	59.693 km/h	Q
4	2	Yan Wang	China			
5	1	Daniela Larreal	Venezuela	12.375 s	58.182 km/h	Q
5	2	Tanya Lindenmuth	United States			
6	1	Iryna Yanovych	Ukraine	12.015 s	59.925 km/h	Q
6	2	Szilvia Noemi Szabolcsi	Hungary			

==== 1/8 repechage ====
Held Monday, 18 September.
The six cyclists defeated in the 1/8 round competed in the 1/8 repechage. Two heats of three riders were held. Winners rejoined the victors from the 1/8 round and advanced to the quarterfinals. The four other riders competed in the 9th through 12th place classification.

Heat	Pos	Athlete	NOS	Time	Ave. Speed	Qualify
1	1	Szilvia Noemi Szabolcsi	Hungary	12.625 s	57.030 km/h	Q
1	2	Yan Wang	China			
1	3	Mira Kasslin	Finland			
2	1	Tanya Lindenmuth	United States	12.275 s	58.656 km/h	Q
2	2	Kathrin Freitag	Germany			
2	3	Fiona Ramage	New Zealand			

==== Classification 9-12 ====
Held 20 September
The 9-12 classification was a single race with all four riders that had lost in the 1/8 repechage taking place. The winner of the race received 9th place, with the others taking the three following places in order.

Pos	Athlete	NOS	Time	Ave. Speed
1	Kathrin Freitag	Germany	12.971 s	55.508 km/h
2	Fiona Ramage	New Zealand		
3	Mira Kasslin	Finland		
4	Yan Wang	China		

=== Quarterfinals ===
Held Tuesday, 19 September.
The eight riders that had advanced to the quarterfinals competed pairwise in four matches. Each match consisted of two races, with a potential third race being used as a tie-breaker if each cyclist won one of the first two races. All four quarterfinals matches were decided without a third race. Winners advanced to the semifinals, losers competed in a 5th to 8th place classification.

Heat	Pos	Athlete	NOS	Time 1	Time 2	Decider	Qualify
1	1	Felicia Ballanger	France	11.772 s	12.060 s		Q
1	2	Tanya Lindenmuth	United States				
2	1	Oxana Grichina	Russia	12.545 s	12.885 s		Q
2	2	Szilvia Noemi Szabolcsi	Hungary				
3	1	Iryna Yanovych	Ukraine	12.048 s	11.946 s		Q
3	2	Tanya Dubnicoff	Canada				
4	1	Michelle Ferris	Australia	REL	11.705 s	11.96 s	Q
4	2	Daniela Larreal	Venezuela			REL	

==== Classification 5-8 ====
Held Wednesday, 20 September
The 5-8 classification was a single race with all four riders that had lost in the quarterfinals taking place. The winner of the race received 5th place, with the others taking the three following places in order.

Pos	Athlete	NOS	Time	Ave. Speed
1	Szilvia Noemi Szabolcsi	Hungary	12.426 s	57.943 km/h
2	Tanya Lindenmuth	United States		
3	Tanya Dubnicoff	Canada		
4	Daniela Larreal	Venezuela		

=== Semifinals ===
Held Wednesday, 20 September.
The four riders that had advanced to the semifinals competed pairwise in two matches. Each match consisted of two races, with a potential third race being used as a tie-breaker if each cyclist won one of the first two races. Winners advanced to the finals, losers competed in the bronze medal match.

Heat	Pos	Athlete	NOS	Time 1	Time 2	Decider	Qualify
1	1	Felicia Ballanger	France	12.328 s	12.124 s		Q
1	2	Michelle Ferris	Australia				
2	1	Oxana Grichina	Russia	12.594	12.726 s		Q
2	2	Iryna Yanovych	Ukraine				

=== Medal Finals ===
Held Wednesday, 20 September.

==== Bronze medal match ====
The bronze medal match was contested in a set of three races, with the winner of two races declared the winner.

Pos	Athlete	NOS	Time 1	Time 2	Decider
1	Iryna Yanovych	Ukraine	12.156 s	13.310 s	
2	Michelle Ferris	Australia			

==== Gold medal match ====
The gold medal match was contested in a set of three races, with the winner of two races declared the winner.

Pos	Athlete	NOS	Time 1	Time 2	Decider
1	Felicia Ballanger	France	12.810 s		12.533 s
2	Oxana Grichina	Russia		13.122 s	

== Final classification ==
	Final results	
Pos.	Athlete	NOC
1.	Felicia Ballanger	France
2.	Oxana Grichina	Russia
3.	Iryna Yanovych	Ukraine
4.	Michelle Ferris	Australia
5.	Szilvia Noemi Szabolcsi	Hungary
6.	Tanya Lindenmuth	United States
7.	Tanya Dubnicoff	Canada
8.	Daniela Larreal	Venezuela
9.	Kathrin Freitag	Germany
10.	Fiona Ramage	New Zealand
11.	Mira Kasslin	Finland
12.	Yan Wang	China
