= 2002 UCI Track Cycling World Championships – Women's 500 m time trial =

Rainbow jersey

The Women's 500m Time Trial was one of the 6 women's events at the 2002 UCI Track Cycling World Championships, held in Copenhagen, Denmark.

18 Cyclists from 14 countries were due to participate in the race. The Final was held on September 26.

== World record ==
World Record
WR	34.000	Jiang Yonghua (CHN)	Kunming (China)	August 11, 2002

== Final ==
Rank	Name	250m	Time	Speed (km/h)
Rank	Name	250m	285-500	Speed (km/h)
	Natallia Tsylinskaya (BLR)	19.645 (2)	34.838	51.667
	Natallia Tsylinskaya (BLR)		15.193 (2)	51.667
	Nancy Contreras (MEX)	19.718 (3)	34.898	51.578
	Nancy Contreras (MEX)		15.180 (1)	51.578
	Kerrie Meares (AUS)	19.607 (1)	34.964	51.481
	Kerrie Meares (AUS)		15.357 (5)	51.481
4	Katrin Meinke (GER)	19.783 (4)	35.180	51.165
4	Katrin Meinke (GER)		15.397 (6)	51.165
5	Tanya Lindenmuth (USA)	19.900 (6)	35.185	51.158
5	Tanya Lindenmuth (USA)		15.285 (4)	51.158
6	Kathrin Freitag (GER)	19.886 (5)	35.365	50.897
6	Kathrin Freitag (GER)		15.479 (7)	50.897
7	Julie Paulding (GBR)	20.291 (11)	35.542	50.644
7	Julie Paulding (GBR)		15.251 (3)	50.644
8	Tamilla Abassova (RUS)	20.077 (7)	35.556	50.624
8	Tamilla Abassova (RUS)		15.479 (8)	50.624
9	Céline Nivert (FRA)	20.095 (8)	35.590	50.576
9	Céline Nivert (FRA)		15.495 (10)	50.576
10	Anna Meares (AUS)	20.120 (9)	35.610	50.547
10	Anna Meares (AUS)		15.490 (9)	50.547
11	Iryna Yanovych (UKR)	20.500 (13)	36.025	49.965
11	Iryna Yanovych (UKR)		15.525 (11)	49.965
12	Yvonne Hijgenaar (NED)	20.474 (12)	36.048	49.933
12	Yvonne Hijgenaar (NED)		15.574 (13)	49.933
13	Tatiana Malianova (RUS)	20.543 (14)	36.109	49.849
13	Tatiana Malianova (RUS)		15.566 (12)	49.849
14	Rebecca Conzelman (USA)	20.193 (10)	36.230	49.682
14	Rebecca Conzelman (USA)		16.037 (17)	49.682
15	Yumari González (CUB)	20.755 (16)	36.391	49.462
15	Yumari González (CUB)		15.636 (14)	49.462
16	Tatiana Makarova (RUS)	20.662 (15)	36.668	49.089
16	Tatiana Makarova (RUS)		16.006 (16)	49.089
17	Szilvia Szabolcsi (HUN)	20.842 (17)	36.776	48.944
17	Szilvia Szabolcsi (HUN)		15.934 (15)	48.944
18	Laura Yoisten (CAN)	21.142 (18)	38.187	47.136
18	Laura Yoisten (CAN)		17.045 (18)	47.136
