= Cycling at the 2000 Summer Olympics – Women's track time trial =

Cycling at the Olympics

The women's 500 metre time trial in Cycling at the 2000 Summer Olympics was a time trial race in which each of the seventeen cyclists attempted to set the fastest time for two laps (500 metre) of the track. The race was held on Saturday, 16 September at the Dunc Gray Velodrome.

== Medalists ==
Gold:	Silver:	Bronze:
Felicia Ballanger, France	Michelle Ferris, Australia	Jiang Cuihua, China

== Records ==
World and Olympics records before the games were held. This was a new event, so there was no previous Olympic record.

World Record	Felicia Ballanger, France	Bordeaux, France	34.010	29 August 1998

== Results ==
- DNS denotes did not start.
- DNF denotes did not finish.
- DQ denotes disqualification.
- NR denotes national record.
- OR denotes Olympic record.
- WR denotes world record.
- PB denotes personal best.
- SB denotes season best.

Rank	Name	NOC	Time	Record
1	Felicia Ballanger	France	34.140	OR
2	Michelle Ferris	Australia	34.692	
3	Jiang Cuihua	China	34.768	
4	Wang Yan	China	35.013	
5	Chris Witty	United States	35.230	
6	Ulrike Weichelt	Germany	35.315	
7	Kathrin Freitag	Germany	35.473	
8	Tanya Dubnicoff	Canada	35.486	
9	Iryna Yanovych	Ukraine	35.512	
10	Daniela Larreal	Venezuela	35.728	
11	Magali Faure-Humbert	France	35.766	
12	Szilvia Noemi Szabolcsi	Hungary	35.778	
13	Lori-Ann Muenzer	Canada	35.846	
14	Lyndelle Higginson	Australia	35.859	
15	Oxana Grichina	Russia	36.169	
16	Fiona Ramage	New Zealand	36.536	
17	Mira Kasslin	Finland	37.145	
