= Cycling at the 1996 Summer Olympics – Women's sprint =

Cycling at the Olympics

Women's cycling sprint at the Games of the XXVI Olympiad
- Venue: Stone Mountain
- Date: 24–27 July 1996
- Competitors: 14 from 14 nations

Medalists
1st place, gold medalist(s)		Félicia Ballanger	France
2nd place, silver medalist(s)		Michelle Ferris	Australia
3rd place, bronze medalist(s)		Ingrid Haringa	Netherlands

The Women's 200m Sprint at the 1996 Summer Olympics Cycling was an event that consisted of cyclists making three laps around the track. Only the time for the last 200 meters of the 750 meters covered was counted as official time. The races were held on Wednesday, July 24, Thursday, July 25, Friday, July 26, and Saturday, July 27, 1996 at the Stone Mountain Velodrome.

== Medalists ==
Gold:	Silver:	Bronze:
Felicia Ballanger, France	Michelle Ferris, Australia	Ingrid Haringa, Netherlands

== Results ==
- Q denotes qualification by place in heat.
- q denotes qualification by overall place.
- REL denotes relegated- due to being passed
- DNS denotes did not start.
- DNF denotes did not finish.
- DQ denotes disqualification.
- NR denotes national record.
- OR denotes Olympic record.
- WR denotes world record.
- PB denotes personal best.
- SB denotes season best.

=== Qualifying round ===
Held July 24

Times and average speeds are listed. 12 qualifying riders were seeded by these results for the first round.

Pos.	Athlete	NOC	Time	Ave. Speed	Notes
1.	Michelle Ferris	Australia	11.212 s	64.21 km/h	Q OR
2.	Felicia Ballanger	France	11.277 s	63.84 km/h	Q
3.	Oksana Grishina	Russia	11.298 s	63.74 km/h	Q
4.	Ingrid Haringa	Netherlands	11.456 s	62.84 km/h	Q
5.	Yan Wang	China	11.519 s	62.50 km/h	Q
6.	Annett Neumann	Germany	11.536 s	62.41 km/h	Q
7.	Connie Paraskevin-Young	United States	11.545 s	62.36 km/h	Q
8.	Tanya Dubnicoff	Canada	11.566 s	62.25 km/h	Q
9.	Erika Salumäe	Estonia	11.566 s	62.25 km/h	Q
10.	Daniela Larreal	Venezuela	11.878 s	60.61; km/h	Q
11.	Mira Kasslin	Finland	11.924 s	60.38 km/h	Q
12.	Donna Wynd	New Zealand	11.961 s	60.19 km/h	Q
13.	Rita Razmaite	Lithuania	11.971 s	60.14 km/h	
14.	Nancy Contreras	Mexico	11.992 s	60.04 km/h	

=== 1/8 final ===
Held July 25. The 1/8 round consisted of six matches, each pitting two of the twelve cyclists against each other. The winners advanced to the quarterfinals, with the losers getting another chance in the 1/8 repechage.

Heat	Pos	Athlete	NOS	Time	Qualify
1	1	Michelle Ferris	Australia	11.932 s	Q
1	2	Donna Wynd	New Zealand		
2	1	Felicia Ballanger	France	11.901 s	Q
2	2	Mira Kasslin	Finland		
3	1	Oksana Grishina	Russia	12.209 s	Q
3	2	Daniela Larreal	Venezuela		
4	1	Ingrid Haringa	Netherlands	12.164 s	Q
4	2	Erika Salumäe	Estonia		
5	1	Tanya Dubnicoff	Canada	12.02 s	Q
5	2	Yan Wang	China		
6	1	Annett Neumann	Germany	12.078 s	Q
6	2	Connie Paraskevin-Young	United States		

==== 1/8 repechage ====
Held July 25.
The six cyclists defeated in the 1/8 round competed in the 1/8 repechage. Two heats of three riders were held. Winners rejoined the victors from the 1/8 round and advanced to the quarterfinals.

Heat	Pos	Athlete	NOS	Time	Qualify
1	1	Erika Salumäe	Estonia	12.018 s	Q
1	2	Connie Paraskevin-Young	United States		
1	3	Donna Wynd	New Zealand		
2	1	Yan Wang	China	12.067 s	Q
2	2	Daniela Larreal	Venezuela		
2	3	Mira Kasslin	Finland		

=== Quarterfinals ===
Held July 26.
The eight riders that had advanced to the quarterfinals competed pairwise in four matches. Each match consisted of two races, with a potential third race being used as a tie-breaker if each cyclist won one of the first two races. All four quarterfinals matches were decided without a third race. Winners advanced to the semifinals, losers competed in a 5th to 8th place classification.

Heat	Pos	Athlete	NOS	Time 1	Time 2	Decider	Qualify
1	1	Michelle Ferris	Australia	11.825 s	11.932 s		Q
1	2	Yan Wang	China				
2	1	Felicia Ballanger	France	11.831 s	12.082 s		Q
2	2	Erika Salumäe	Estonia				
3	1	Annett Neumann	Germany		11.864 s	12.060 s	Q
3	2	Oksana Grishina	Russia	12.119 s			
4	1	Ingrid Haringa	Netherlands			12.049 s	Q
4	2	Tanya Dubnicoff	Canada	12.020 s	REL		

==== Classification 5-8 ====
Held July 26
The 5-8 classification was a single race with all four riders that had lost in the quarterfinals taking place. The winner of the race received 5th place, with the others taking the three following places in order.

Pos	Athlete	NOS	Time
1	Oksana Grishina	Russia	12.416 s
2	Erika Salumäe	Estonia	
3	Yan Wang	China	
4	Tanya Dubnicoff	Canada	

=== Semifinals ===
Held July 26
The four riders that had advanced to the semifinals competed pairwise in two matches. Each match consisted of two races, with a potential third race being used as a tie-breaker if each cyclist won one of the first two races. Winners advanced to the finals, losers competed in the bronze medal match.

Heat	Pos	Athlete	NOS	Time 1	Time 2	Decider	Qualify
1	1	Michelle Ferris	Australia	12.080 s	12.076 s		Q
1	2	Ingrid Haringa	Netherlands				
2	1	Felicia Ballanger	France	12.022 s	12.046 s		Q
2	2	Annett Neumann	Germany				

=== Medal Finals ===
Held July 27.

==== Bronze medal match ====
The bronze medal match was contested in a set of three races, with the winner of two races declared the winner.

Pos	Athlete	NOS	Time 1	Time 2	Decider
1	Ingrid Haringa	Netherlands		12.074 s	11.782 s
2	Annett Neumann	Germany	12.260 s		

==== Gold medal match ====
The gold medal match was contested in a set of three races, with the winner of two races declared the winner.

Pos	Athlete	NOS	Time 1	Time 2	Decider
1	Felicia Ballanger	France	11.903 s	12.096 s	
2	Michelle Ferris	Australia			

== Final classification ==
	Final results	
Pos.	Athlete	NOC
1.	Felicia Ballanger	France
2.	Michelle Ferris	Australia
3.	Ingrid Haringa	Netherlands
4.	Annett Neumann	Germany
5.	Oxana Grichina	Russia
6.	Erika Salumäe	Estonia
7.	Yan Wang	China
8.	Tanya Dubnicoff	Canada
