= Carsten Bergemann =

German cyclist (born 1979)

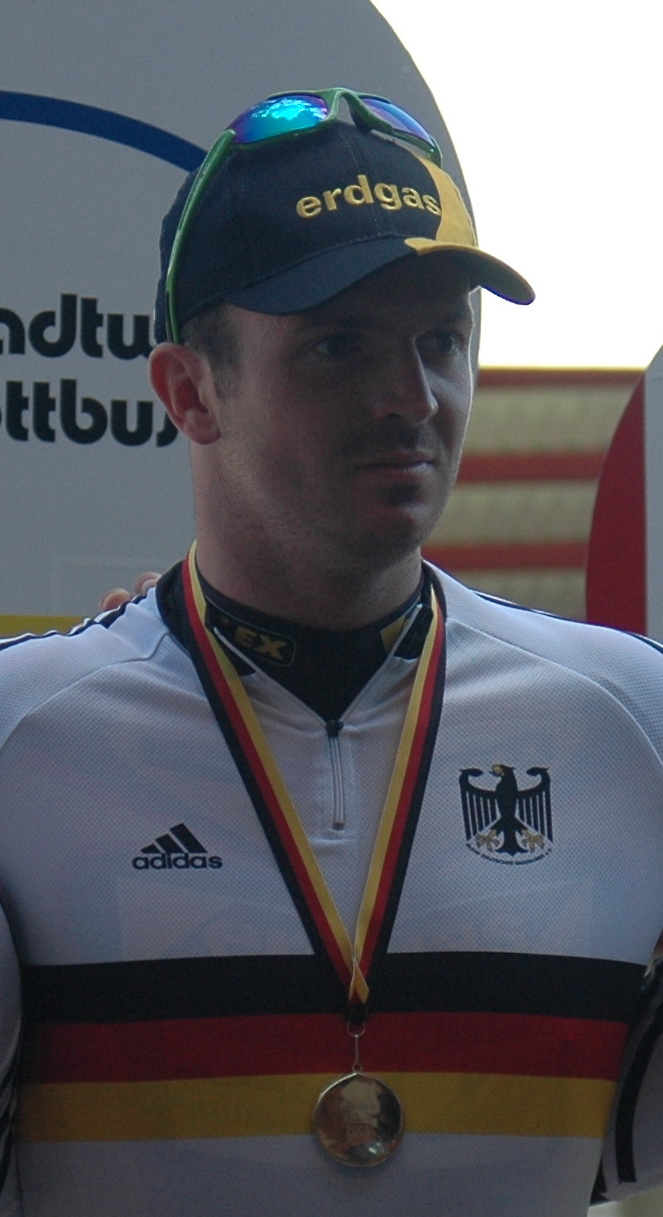
- Bergemann at the 2006 German national track championships

Personal information
- Full name: Carsten Bergemann
- Born: 24 January 1979 (age 47) Bautzen, Bezirk Dresden, East Germany

Cycling career
- Sport: Cycling
- Discipline: Track
- Role: Rider
- Rider type: Sprinter
Medal record
Representing Germany
Men's track cycling
World Championships
Gold medal – first place	2003 Stuttgart	Team sprint
Bronze medal – third place	2002 Copenhagen	Team sprint

Carsten Bergemann (born 24 January 1979, in Bautzen) is a German track cyclist, specialising in the sprint disciplines. Bergemann was world champion as part of the Germany team in team sprint in 2003.

== Major results ==
Date	Placing	Event	Competition	Location	Country
1999	2	1 km time trial	National championships	Berlin	Germany
1999	2	Team sprint (Note: The other riders on the squad were Thomas Henke and Stefan Nimke)	National championships	Berlin	Germany
17 June 2000	2	Team sprint (Note: The other riders on the squad were Matthias John and Eyk Pokorny)	World Cup	Mexico City	Mexico
29 June 2000	2	1 km time trial	National championships	Hamburg	Germany
30 June 2000	1	Team sprint (Note: The other riders on the squad were Jens Fiedler and Jan van Eijden)	National championships	Hamburg	Germany
2 July 2000	3	Keirin	National championships	Hamburg	Germany
July 2001	1st place, gold medalist(s)	Team sprint (Note: The other riders on the squad were Matthias John and Stefan Nimke)	European Track Championships	Fiorenzuola	Italy
25 May 2001	3	1 km time trial	World Cup	Cali	Colombia
26 May 2001	1	Team sprint (Note: The other riders on the squad were Jens Fiedler and Matthias John)	World Cup	Cali	Colombia
July 2001	3	1 km time trial	National championships	Chemnitz	Germany
19 April 2002	2	Team sprint (Note: The other riders on the squad were Matthias John and René Wolff)	World Cup	Monterrey	Mexico
July 2002	3	1 km time trial	National championships	Büttgen	Germany
July 2002	1	Team sprint (Note: The other riders on the squad were Jens Fiedler and Stefan Nimke)	National championships	Büttgen	Germany
July 2002	3	Sprint	National championships	Büttgen	Germany
18 July 2002	1st place, gold medalist(s)	Team sprint (Note: The other riders on the squad were Matthias John and Sören Lausberg)	European Track Championships	Büttgen	Germany
10 August 2002	3	Sprint	World Cup	Kunming	China
27 September 2002	3rd place, bronze medalist(s)	Team sprint (Note: The other riders on the squad were Jens Fiedler and Sören Lausberg)	World Championships	Ballerup	Denmark
13 April 2003	2	Team sprint (Note: The other riders on the squad were Matthias John and Stefan Nimke)	World Cup	Cape Town	South Africa
May 2003	2	Team sprint (Note: The other riders on the squad were Jens Fiedler and Jan van Eijden)	National championships		Germany
May 2003	2	1 km time trial	National championships		Germany
3 August 2003	1st place, gold medalist(s)	Team sprint (Note: The other riders on the squad were Jens Fiedler and René Wolff)	World Championships	Stuttgart	Germany
2004	1	1 km time trial	National championships	Leipzig	Germany
2004	1	Team sprint (Note: The other riders on the squad were Stefan Nimke and Jens Fiedler)	National championships	Leipzig	Germany
2004	3	Sprint	National championships	Leipzig	Germany
13 February 2004	3	1 km time trial	World Cup	Moscow	Russia
15 February 2004	1	Team sprint (Note: The other riders on the squad were Jens Fiedler and René Wolff)	World Cup	Moscow	Russia
15 December 2004	2	Team sprint (Note: The other riders on the squad were Matthias John and Stefan Nimke)	World Cup	Los Angeles	United States
August 2005	2	Sprint	National championships	Hamburg	Germany
August 2005	2	Team sprint (Note: The other riders on the squad were Stefan Nimke and Jan van Eijden)	National championships	Hamburg	Germany
19 August 2005	1	1 km time trial	National championships	Hamburg	Germany
4 November 2005	2	1 km time trial	World Cup	Moscow	Russia
6 November 2005	1	Team sprint (Note: The other riders on the squad were Matthias John and Stefan Nimke)	World Cup	Moscow	Russia
18 August 2006	3	1 km time trial	National championships	Cottbus	Germany
19 August 2006	2	Keirin	National championships	Cottbus	Germany
19 August 2006	1	Team sprint (Note: The other riders on the squad were Benjamin Wittmann and Stefan Nimke)	National championships	Cottbus	Germany
19 January 2007	2	1 km time trial	World Cup	Los Angeles	United States
23 August 2007	2	Team sprint (Note: The other riders on the squad were Benjamin Wittmann and Robert Förstemann)	National championships	Berlin	Germany
24 August 2007	2	1 km time trial	National championships	Berlin	Germany
26 August 2007	2	Sprint	National championships	Berlin	Germany
11 December 2008	1	Team sprint (Note: The other riders on the squad were Robert Förstemann and Stefan Nimke)	World Cup	Cali	Colombia
8 July 2009	1	Team sprint (Note: The other riders on the squad were Robert Förstemann and Sascha Hübner)	National championships	Erfurt	Germany
19 November 2009	2	Team sprint (Note: The other riders on the squad were René Enders and Tobias Wachter)	World Cup	Melbourne	Australia
20 November 2009	1	Keirin	World Cup	Melbourne	Australia
