= 2004 UCI Track Cycling World Championships =

Cycling world championships

- Venue: Melbourne, Australia
- Date: 26–30 May 2004
- Velodrome: Vodafone Arena
- Events: 15

The 2004 UCI Track Cycling World Championships were the World Championship set of events for track cycling. Both men's and women's events took place, with nine men's events and six women's events. They took place in Melbourne, Australia from 26 to 30 May 2004. 43 nations competed, and competitors from 19 nations were awarded medals.

== Medal table ==
Rank	Nation	Gold	Silver	Bronze	Total
1	France (FRA)	3	2	0	5
2	Australia (AUS)	2	2	1	5
2	Great Britain (GBR)	2	2	1	5
4	Russia (RUS)	2	0	2	4
5	New Zealand (NZL)	2	0	0	2
6	Spain (ESP)	1	2	1	4
7	Netherlands (NED)	1	1	2	4
8	Argentina (ARG)	1	0	2	3
9	Cuba (CUB)	1	0	0	1
10	Italy (ITA)	0	2	0	2
11	Canada (CAN)	0	1	1	2
12	China (CHN)	0	1	0	1
12	Switzerland (SUI)	0	1	0	1
12	Uruguay (URU)	0	1	0	1
15	Czech Republic (CZE)	0	0	1	1
15	Germany (GER)	0	0	1	1
15	Lithuania (LTU)	0	0	1	1
15	Mexico (MEX)	0	0	1	1
15	United States (USA)	0	0	1	1
Totals (19 entries)		15	15	15	45

== Medal summary ==
Event	Gold		Silver		Bronze	
Men's events
Men's sprint	Theo Bos; Netherlands		Laurent Gané; France		Ryan Bayley; Australia	
Men's 1 km time trial	Chris Hoy; Great Britain	1:01.599	Arnaud Tournant; France	1:01.957	Theo Bos; Netherlands	1:02.055
Men's individual pursuit	Sergi Escobar; Spain		Rob Hayles; Great Britain		Robert Bartko; Germany	
Men's team pursuit	Peter Dawson; Ashley Hutchinson; Luke Roberts; Stephen Wooldridge; Mark Renshaw (qualifying round only); Australia		Rob Hayles; Paul Manning; Chris Newton; Bryan Steel; Great Britain		Carlos Castaño; Sergi Escobar; Asier Maeztu; Carlos Torrent; Spain	
Men's team sprint	Mickaël Bourgain; Laurent Gané; Arnaud Tournant; France		José Antonio Escuredo; Salvador Meliá; José Antonio Villanueva; Spain		Chris Hoy; Craig MacLean; Jamie Staff; Great Britain	
Men's keirin	Jamie Staff; Great Britain		José Antonio Escuredo; Spain		Ivan Vrba; Czech Republic	
Men's scratch	Greg Henderson; New Zealand		Robert Slippens; Netherlands		Walter Pérez; Argentina	
Men's points race	Franck Perque; France	35	Milton Wynants; Uruguay	31	Juan Curuchet; Argentina	28
Men's madison	Juan Curuchet; Walter Pérez; Argentina	7	Bruno Risi; Franco Marvulli; Switzerland	5	Robert Slippens; Danny Stam; Netherlands	18 (-1 lap)
Women's events
Women's sprint	Svetlana Grankovskaya; Russia		Anna Meares; Australia		Lori-Ann Muenzer; Canada	
Women's 500 m time trial	Anna Meares; Australia		Jiang Yonghua; China		Simona Krupeckaitė; Lithuania	
Women's individual pursuit	Sarah Ulmer; New Zealand		Katie Mactier; Australia		Elena Tchalikh; Russia	
Women's keirin	Clara Sanchez; France		Elisa Frisoni; Italy		Jennie Reed; United States	
Women's scratch	Yoanka González; Cuba		Mandy Poitras; Canada		Olga Sliusareva; Russia	
Women's points race	Olga Sliusareva; Russia	39	Vera Carrara; Italy	31	Belem Guerrero Méndez; Mexico	30
