= Olympic record progression track cycling – Women's flying 200 m time trial =

This is an overview of the progression of the Olympic track cycling record of the women's flying 200 m time trial as recognised by the Union Cycliste Internationale (UCI).

The women's flying 200 m time trial is the qualification for the women's sprint. This discipline was introduced at the 1988 Summer Olympics.

== Progression ==
♦ denotes a performance that is also a current world record. Statistics are correct as of the end of the 2024 Summer Olympics.

Time	Cyclists	Location	Track	Date	Meet	Ref
11.527*	Erika Salumäe (URS)	Seoul (South Korea)		21 July 1988	1988 Summer Olympics	
11.419	Ingrid Haringa (NED)	Barcelona (Spain)	Open air track	28 July 1992	1992 Summer Olympics	
11.212	Michelle Ferris (AUS)	Atlanta (United States)	Open air track	24 July 1996	1996 Summer Olympics	
10.963	Victoria Pendleton (GBR)	Beijing (China)	Indoor track	17 August 2008	2008 Summer Olympics	
10.724	Victoria Pendleton (GBR)	London (United Kingdom) , London Velopark	Indoor track	5 August 2012	2012 Summer Olympics	
10.721	Becky James (GBR)	Rio de Janeiro (Brazil) , Rio Olympic Velodrome	Indoor track	14 August 2016	2016 Olympic Games	
10.310	Lea Friedrich (GER)	Izu (Japan) , Izu Velodrome	Indoor track	6 August 2021	2020 Olympic Games	
♦10.029	Lea Friedrich (GER)	(France) Saint-Quentin-en-Yvelines	Indoor track	9 August 2024	2024 Olympic Games	

* Not listed by the UCI as an Olympic record
