= Ivan Vrba =

Czech cyclist

Personal information
- Full name: Ivan Vrba
- Born: 15 June 1977 (age 49) Zlín, Czech Republic

Cycling career
- Sport: Cycling
- Discipline: Track
- Role: Rider
- Rider type: Sprinter
Medal record
Representing the Czech Republic
Men's track cycling
World Championships
Bronze medal – third place	2004 Melbourne	Keirin

Ivan Vrba (born 15 June 1977 in Zlín) is a Czech track cyclist. Vrba specialises in the sprint disciplines and won the bronze medal in keirin at the 2004 UCI Track Cycling World Championships.

== Palmarès ==
Date	Placing	Event	Competition	Location	Country
28 May 2000	1	Keirin	World Cup	Cali	Colombia
1 June 2002	3	Scratch	World Cup	Moscow	Russia
10 August 2002	1	Scratch	World Cup	Kunming	China
14 February 2003	3	Keirin	World Cup	Moscow	Russia
27 May 2004	3rd place, bronze medalist(s)	Keirin	World Championships	Melbourne	Australia
5 November 2004	3	Keirin	World Cup	Moscow	Russia
October 2005	3	Team pursuit (Note: The other riders on the squad were Lukas Petr, Karel Bucek and Matou Jobanek)	National championships	Prague	Czech Republic
October 2005	1	Keirin	National championships	Prague	Czech Republic
