= Volodymyr Rybin =

Ukrainian cyclist

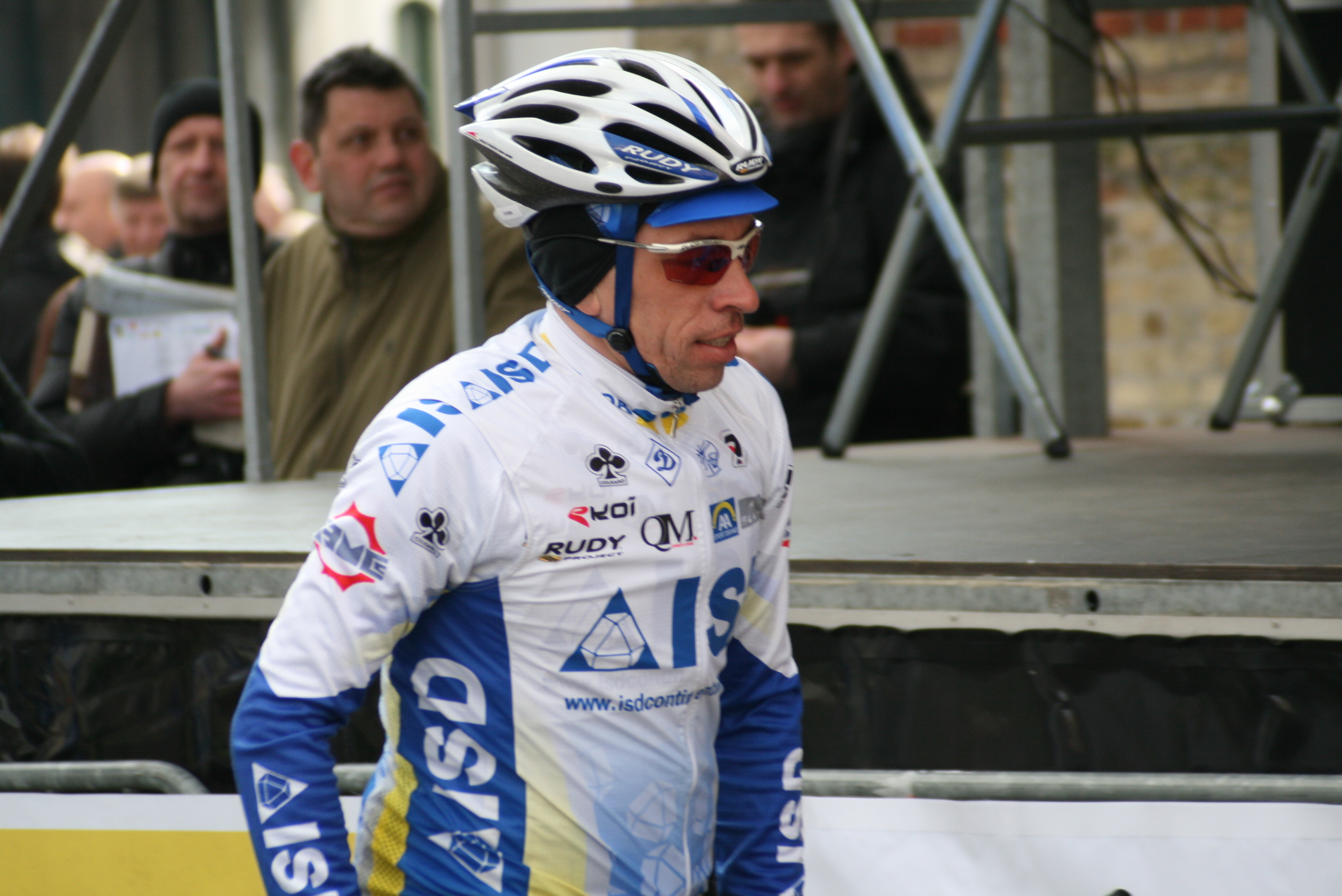
- Rybin at the 2010 Three Days of West Flanders

Personal information
- Full name: Volodymyr Ivanovych Rybin; Володимир Іванович Рибін
- Born: 14 September 1980 (age 46) Kreminna, Ukrainian SSR, Soviet Union
- Height: 1.76 m (5 ft 9 in)
- Weight: 69 kg (152 lb)

Cycling career
- Sport: Cycling
- Disciplines: Track and road
- Role: Rider
- Rider type: Endurance

Professional teams
- 2005–2006: Universal Caffé
- 2007–2010: ISD Sport Donetsk
Medal record
Representing Ukraine
Men's track cycling
World Championships
Gold medal – first place	2005 Los Angeles	Points race
Silver medal – second place	2006 Bordeaux	Madison

Volodymyr Ivanovych Rybin (Ukrainian: Володимир Іванович Рибін; born 14 September 1980) is a Ukrainian professional racing cyclist, who has achieved most success on both the track, where he was 2005 world champion in the points race. Rybin won a silver medal as well in the Madison in 2006 and has represented Ukraine at the 2004 and 2008 Summer Olympics.

== Palmarès ==
Date	Placing	Event	Competition	Location	Country
9 July 2009	3	Points race	World Cup	Kunming	China
17 May 2003	2	Points race	World Cup	Sydney	Australia
13 February 2004	2	Scratch	World Cup	Moscow	Russia
12 March 2004	1	Madison (Note: The other rider on the team was Vasyl Yakovlev)	World Cup	Aguascalientes	Mexico
10 April 2004	2	Madison	World Cup	Manchester	United Kingdom
17 January 2005	2	Scratch	World Cup	Manchester	United Kingdom
19 February 2005	1	Points race	World Cup	Sydney	Australia
20 February 2005	1	Madison (Note: The other rider on the team was Dmytro Grabovskyy)	World Cup	Sydney	Australia
24 March 2005	1st place, gold medalist(s)	Points race	World Championships	Los Angeles	United States
16 April 2006	2nd place, silver medalist(s)	Madison (Note: The other rider on the team was Lyubomyr Polatayko)	World Championships	Bordeaux	France
19 December 2007	3	Madison	World Cup	Beijing	China
