= Svetlana Grankovskaya =

Russian cyclist (born 1976)

Personal information
- Full name: Svetlana Grankovskaya
- Born: 22 February 1976 (age 50) Kharkiv, Ukrainian SSR, Soviet Union

Cycling career
- Sport: Cycling
- Discipline: Track
- Role: Rider
Medal record
Representing Russia
Women's track cycling
| Gold medal – first place | 2001 Antwerp | Sprint |
| Gold medal – first place | 2003 Stuttgart | Sprint |
| Gold medal – first place | 2003 Stuttgart | Keirin |
| Gold medal – first place | 2004 Melbourne | Sprint |

Svetlana Grankovskaya (also spelt Svetlana Grankovskaia, born 22 February 1976) is a Russian track racing cyclist from Kharkiv, and four times world champion. Despite being born in Ukraine, independent since 1991, she has represented Russia at world championships, Summer Olympics and World Cup events.

She missed a bronze medal at the 2004 Summer Olympics, losing the sprint in the final against Anna Meares of Australia.

== Palmarès ==
2001
1st Sprint, Track World Championships

2002
2nd Sprint, 2002 Track World Cup, Monterrey
3rd Keirin, 2002 Track World Cup, Monterrey
2nd Sprint, 2002 Track World Cup, Moscow

2003
1st Sprint, Track World Championships
1st Keirin, Track World Championships

2004
1st Sprint, Track World Championships
1st Sprint, 2004 Track World Cup, Moscow
1st Team Sprint, 2004 Track World Cup, Moscow (with Oksana Grichina)
4th Summer Olympics
2008
3rd Team Sprint, Round 1, 2008–2009 Track World Cup, Manchester
