= Fiona Ramage =

New Zealand cyclist

Personal information
- Born: 12 July 1978 (age 47)

Sport
- Country: New Zealand
- Sport: Cycling

Fiona Ramage (born 12 July 1978) is a New Zealand cyclist. She competed at the 2000 Summer Olympics in Sydney, in the women's sprint where she came in 10th, and the women's track time trial where she came in 16th.

In 2000 she won the New Zealand National Road Race Championships.
