= Łukasz Kwiatkowski =

Polish cyclist (1982–2018)

Personal information
- Born: 29 May 1982 Grudziądz, Poland
- Died: 25 November 2018 (aged 36)
- Height: 1.89 m (6 ft 2 in)
- Weight: 92 kg (203 lb)

Cycling career
- Sport: Cycling
- Discipline: Track
- Role: Rider
- Rider type: Sprinter

Professional team
- 2009: ASK Stal Grudziądz
Medal record
Men's track cycling
Representing Poland
European Championships
Gold medal – first place	2005 Fiorenzuola	Team sprint
Silver medal – second place	2004 Valencia	Team sprint
World Junior Championships
Silver medal – second place	2000 Fiorenzuola	Sprint
European U23 Championships
Gold medal – first place	2002 Büttgen	Sprint
Silver medal – second place	2001 Brno	Team sprint
Silver medal – second place	2002 Büttgen	Team sprint
Silver medal – second place	2003 Moscow	Sprint
Bronze medal – third place	2001 Brno	Sprint
Bronze medal – third place	2002 Büttgen	Keirin
Bronze medal – third place	2004 Valencia	Sprint

Łukasz Kwiatkowski (29 May 1982 – 25 November 2018) was a Polish professional track cyclist. He represented his nation Poland in two Olympic Games (2004 and 2008), and also claimed numerous medals in track cycling at the UCI World Cup and European Championships since 2002. During his sporting career, Kwiatkowski raced for the ASK Stal Grudziądz pro cycling team before his official retirement in 2010.

== Racing career ==
Kwiatkowski was born in Grudziądz. Considered one of Poland's strongest cyclists, he made headlines on the international scene as an 18-year-old teen, when he claimed the silver medal in the sprint final match against Australia's Ryan Bayley at the 2000 UCI Junior Track World Championships in Fiorenzuola, Italy.

An early success from junior cycling tournaments helped Kwiatkowski develop his form from a pure power sprinter into being one of the most successful Polish cyclists of all time. This showed that he had collected numerous medals in men's Keirin, sprint, and team sprint events at the European U-23 Championships and UCI World Cup.

Selected as the official member of the Polish cycling team, Kwiatkowski made his debut at the 2004 Summer Olympics in Athens, where he edged out Germany's top favorite Jens Fiedler to take the seventh spot in the men's keirin, but lost the repechage round one match to Barbados' Barry Forde in the men's sprint. Affiliating with Damian Zieliński and Rafał Furman in the men's team sprint, Kwiatkowski rode a split time of 13.360 on the second leg to deliver the Polish trio a ninth-place finish in 45.093, narrowly missing out in the first round match by eleven-hundredths of a second (0.11).

Shortly after his first Olympics, Kwiatkowski started the 2005–2006 season at the European Championships, where he helped the Polish squad score a more satisfactory triumph in the men's team sprint. He also added a silver medal to his seasonal career hardware in the final match against Ukraine's Andriy Vynokurov at the first stage of the UCI World Cup series in Moscow, Russia, making him the most successful male rider of the season by the Polish Cycling Federation.

Three years later, Kwiatkowski qualified for his second Polish squad, as a 25-year-old, in two track cycling events at the 2008 Summer Olympics in Beijing by receiving a berth from the UCI Track World Rankings. In the men's team sprint, held on the first day of the track program, Kwiatkowski and his teammates Maciej Bielecki and Kamil Kuczyński set a thirteenth-place time of 45.266 and an average speed of 59.647 km/h in an opening heat against Japan, but were relegated for swerving out of the lane on the final stretch, handing their rivals a more satisfactory triumph. Two days later, in the men's sprint, Kwiatkowski could not progress from the early stages after losing out again in the first round to Great Britain's Jason Kenny and the repechage to Malaysia's Azizulhasni Awang.

Kwiatkowski died at the age of 36 from leukemia.

== Career highlights ==
2000

- (silver) UCI Junior Track World Championships (Sprint), Fiorenzuola (ITA)

2002

- (gold) European Championships (Sprint), Büttgen (GER)
- (silver) European Championships (Team sprint), Büttgen (GER)
- (silver) Stage 2, UCI World Cup (Sprint), Moscow (RUS)
- (bronze) European Championships (Keirin), Büttgen (GER)
- (bronze) Stage 1, UCI World Cup (Team sprint), Monterrey (MEX)

2003

- (silver) European Championships (Team sprint), Moscow (RUS)
- (silver) Stage 1, UCI World Cup (Team sprint), Moscow (RUS)

2004

- (silver) European Championships (Team sprint), Valencia (ESP)
- (silver) Stage 4, UCI World Cup (Team sprint), Sydney (AUS)
- (bronze) European Championships (Sprint), Valencia (ESP)
- 7th Olympic Games (Keirin), Athens (GRE)
- 9th Olympic Games (Team sprint with Rafał Furman and Damian Zieliński), Athens (GRE)

2005

- (gold) European Championships (Team sprint with Kamil Kuczyński and Damian Zieliński), Fiorenzuola (ITA)
- (silver) Stage 3, UCI World Cup (Sprint), Manchester (GBR)
- (silver) Stage 3, UCI World Cup (Team sprint), Manchester (GBR)
- (silver) Stage 1, UCI World Cup (Keirin), Moscow (RUS)

2006

- (silver) Stage 3, UCI World Cup (Team sprint), Carson, California (USA)

2008

- 13th Olympic Games (Team sprint with Maciej Bielecki and Kamil Kuczyński), Beijing (CHN)
- 17th Olympic Games (Sprint), Beijing (CHN)
