= Miguel Alzamora =

Spanish cyclist

Personal information
- Born: 17 February 1974 (age 52) Artà, Spain
- Height: 1.84 m (6 ft 0 in)
- Weight: 78 kg (172 lb)

Cycling career
- Sport: Cycling
- Current team: Retired
- Disciplines: Track, road
- Role: Rider

Professional teams
- 2000: Amica Chips–Tacconi Sport
- 2001: Tacconi Sport–Vini Caldirola
Medal record
Representing Spain
Men's track cycling
World Championships
Gold medal – first place	1997 Perth	Madison

Miguel Alzamora (sometimes spelled Miquel; born 17 February 1974 in Artà) is a Spanish former track cyclist. He won the madison at the 1997 UCI Track Cycling World Championships with Joan Llaneras. He also competed at the 2000 and 2004 Summer Olympics.

== Major results ==
1997
1st Madison, World Track Championships (with Joan Llaneras)
1999
World Cup Classics

1st Madison, Cali (with Joan Llaneras)
1st Madison, Mexico City (with Joan Llaneras)
2nd Madison, Frisco (with Isaac Gálvez)

2000
1st Points race, National Track Championships
2002
1st Scratch, National Track Championships
World Cup Classics

1st Madison, Monterrey (with Joan Llaneras)
2nd Scratch, Moscow

2003
World Cup Classics

1st Scratch, Aguascalientes
2nd Madison, Aguascalientes

2004
World Cup Classics

2nd Madison, Sydney

2006
1st Scratch, National Track Championships
