= Rebecca Ellis =

American politician

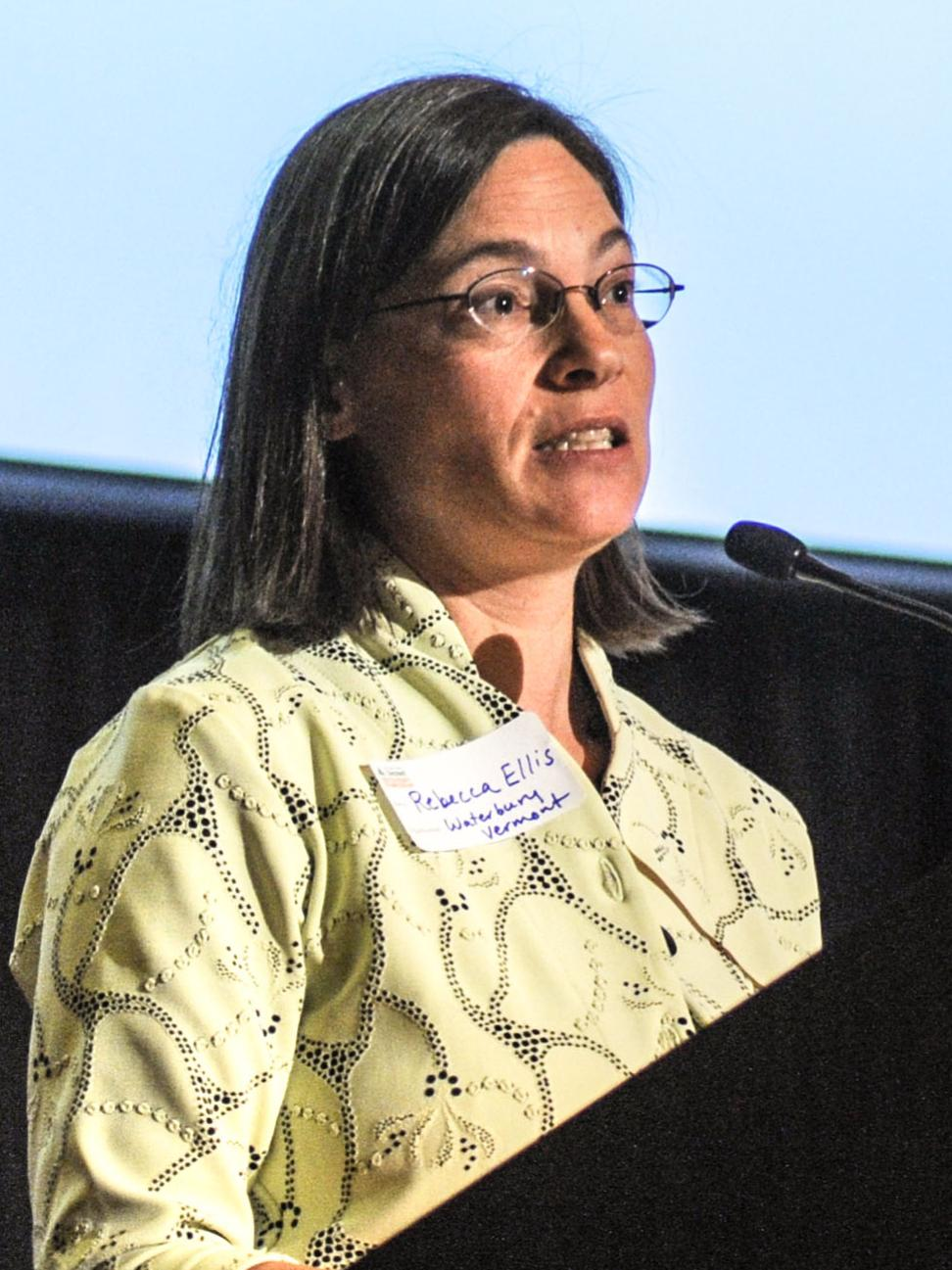

Member of the Vermont House of Representatives from the Washington-Chittenden district
- In office 2012–2016

Personal details
- Party: Democratic
- Education: Harvard College; Princeton University; Georgetown University

Rebecca Ellis is an American politician. She served as a Democratic member for the Washington-Chittenden district of the Vermont House of Representatives from 2012 to 2016.
