= Erin Mirabella =

American cyclist (born 1978)

Personal information
- Full name: Erin Veenstra-Mirabella
- Born: May 18, 1978 (age 48) Racine, Wisconsin, U.S.
- Height: 5 ft 5 in (1.65 m)

Cycling career
- Sport: Cycling
- Discipline: Track
- Role: Rider

Professional teams
- 1999: Pedalers
- 2000: Timex
- 2001: Jane's Cosmetics
Medal record
Representing United States
Pan American Games
Gold medal – first place	1999 Winnipeg	Pursuit
Gold medal – first place	1999 Winnipeg	Points race

Erin Veenstra-Mirabella (born May 18, 1978) is an American competitive cyclist. She represented the United States at the 2000 and 2004 Summer Olympics. Mirabella is a six-time national champion. She is coached by her husband Chris Mirabella.

== Palmarès ==
1999
1st Pursuit, Pan American Games, Winnipeg, Canada
1st Points race, Pan American Games, Winnipeg, Canada
1st Pursuit, 1999 UCI Track Cycling World Cup Classics

2002
1st Scratch race, 2002 UCI Track Cycling World Cup Classics, Round 1, Monterrey
1st Pursuit, 2002 UCI Track Cycling World Cup Classics
1st Points race, 2002 UCI Track Cycling World Cup Classics

2003
2nd Pursuit, American National Track Championships
3rd Scratch race, American National Track Championships
2nd Pursuit, 2004 UCI Track Cycling World Cup Classics, Round 2, Aguascalientes

2004
4th Points race, Olympic Games
1st Points race, 2004 UCI Track Cycling World Cup Classics, Round 2, Aguascalientes
3rd Points race, 2004–2005 UCI Track Cycling World Cup Classics, Round 2, Los Angeles

2005
1st Points race, Pan American Championships
3rd Pursuit, Pan American Championships

== Books ==
Mirabella has used her experiences as an Olympic athlete to write a series of children's books, The Barnsville Sports Squad Series.

- Gracie Goat's Big Bike Race, VeloPress, ISBN 978-1-931382-88-5 (June 10, 2007), illustrated by Lisa Horstman
- Shawn Sheep The Soccer Star, VeloPress, ISBN 978-1-934030-16-5 (July 28, 2008), illustrated by Sarah Davis
