= Michelle Ferris =

Australian cyclist (born 1976)

Personal information
- Born: 24 September 1976 (age 50) Warrnambool, Australia

Cycling career
- Sport: Cycling
- Discipline: Track
Medal record
Representing Australia
Women's track cycling
Olympic Games
Silver medal – second place	1996 Atlanta	Sprint
Silver medal – second place	2000 Sydney	Time trial
UCI Track World Championships
Silver medal – second place	1997 Perth	500 m time trial
Bronze medal – third place	1995 Bogota	500 m time trial
Bronze medal – third place	1996 Manchester	500 m time trial
Bronze medal – third place	1998 Bordeaux	500 m time trial
Commonwealth Games
Silver medal – second place	1994 Victoria BC	Sprint
Silver medal – second place	1998 Kuala Lumpur	Sprint

Michelle Louise Ferris (24 September 1976) is an Australian cyclist. She won the Silver Medal in Women's sprint in 1996 Summer Olympics and the 2000 Summer Olympics.

Her biggest rival was Félicia Ballanger, who beat her in the World Championships as well as in the Olympics. In the World Cup in 1997, she did beat her, making her one of only a few cyclists who were able to beat Ballanger in a big tournament.

In summer 2020, Ferris took on a role as Assistant Mentor Coach to the cycling squad at the Western Sydney Academy of Sport.

She is one of the few professional Australian athletes to come out publicly as gay, noting "Whenever I was interviewed after a race during my career, the journalists always asked me about my performance, no one ever asked if I was gay. If that question had been asked, I would have answered it honestly. I've never been afraid of who I am. But when you're talking about your race results, you're not going to add on at the end, 'By the way, I'm gay'." She has served as an ambassador for the Gay Games and stated she "can't say why so many lesbian athletes stay silent. But she says that while it was no secret she was gay when she won her silver medals at the Atlanta and Sydney Olympics, she never spoke about it publicly at the time."

== Palmarès ==
=== Olympic Games ===
- (silver) 1996, 2000 2nd 500m

=== World Championship ===
- (silver) 1997, 1998, 1999 2nd sprint
- (silver) 1995, 1996, 1997 2nd 500m

== Honours ==
- Added to the Cycling Australia Hall of Fame in 2018
