= Vera Carrara =

Italian cyclist (born 1980)

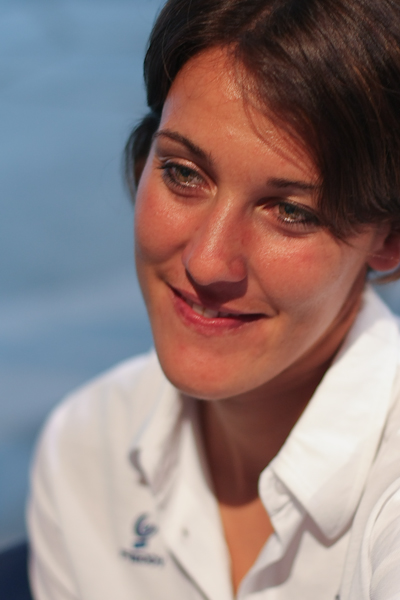

Personal information
- Full name: Vera Carrara
- Born: April 6, 1980 (age 46) Alzano Lombardo, Italy
- Height: 1.78 m (5 ft 10 in)
- Weight: 62 kg (137 lb; 9.8 st)

Cycling career
- Sport: Cycling
- Disciplines: Road & Track
- Role: Rider

Amateur teams
- 1987–1996: G.S. Valoti Arredamenti
- 1997: Selene Rama-Valoti
- 1998: Equipe
- 1999: Selene Rama-Valoti
- 2000: Bata Moser

Professional teams
- 2001–2002: Team Itera
- 2003: Road Runner Guerciotti
- 2004: G.S. Fiamme Azzurre
- 2006: USC Chirio Forno d'Asolo
- 2007: Safi - Pasta Zara - Manhattan
- 2008–: Cmax Dila

Major wins
- Multiple World Champion

Vera Carrara (born 6 April 1980) is an Italian professional racing cyclist.

Carrara was born in Alzano Lombardo and joined the G.S. Valoti Arredamenti at the age of seven. Since then she has become a multiple world champion in the points race, but despite her track cycling success she also races on the road, winning a stage of the Holland Ladies Tour in 2006 and finishing second in the prologue of the 2008 Giro d'Italia Femminile.

== Palmarès ==
1998
1st Points race, UCI Track Cycling World Championships, Juniors

2000
3rd European Road Race Championships, U23, Kielce (POL)

2001
3rd European Track Championships, Omnium

2002
1st Pursuit, European Track Championships, U23
3rd Points race, UCI Track Cycling World Championships, Kopenhagen
2nd European Time Trial Championships, U23, Grassobbio (ITA)

2003
2nd Pursuit, Italian National Track Championships
1st Points race, 2003 UCI Track Cycling World Cup Classics, Sydney (AUS)
2nd Points race, 2003 UCI Track Cycling World Cup Classics, Cape Town (RSA)

2004
2nd Points race, UCI Track Cycling World Championships, Melbourne
1st Giro del Lago Maggiore - GP Knorr (SUI)
5th Points race, 2004 Summer Olympics

2005
2nd Points race, 2004–2005 UCI Track Cycling World Cup Classics, Manchester (GBR)
1st Points race, UCI Track Cycling World Championships, Los Angeles

2006
1st Points race, 2005–2006 UCI Track Cycling World Cup Classics, Sydney (AUS)
1st Points race, UCI Track Cycling World Championships, Bordeaux
1st Stage 5, Holland Ladies Tour, Oirschot (NED)
2007
1st Points race, Italian National Track Championships, Dalmine
2nd Scratch, Italian National Track Championships, Dalmine
1st Italian National Time Trial Championships, Novi Ligure
1st Omnium, European Track Championships, Cottbus (GER)

2008
3rd Points race, UCI Track Cycling World Championships
1st GP Rund um Visp (SUI)
2nd Prologue, Giro d'Italia Femminile, Mantova
14th Points race, 2008 Summer Olympics
