= UCI Track Cycling World Cup =

Track cycling championship

Race details
- Date: October–February
- Region: Worldwide
- Discipline: Track
- Organiser: Union Cycliste Internationale
- Web site: www.uci.org/track/events/tissot-uci-track-cycling-world-cup

History
- First edition: 1993
- Editions: 28
- Final edition: 2019–20
- Most wins: Germany (10 titles)
- Final winner: Poland (1st title)

The UCI Track Cycling World Cup (formerly known as the UCI Track Cycling World Cup Classics) was a multi race tournament held over a track cycling season - usually between October and February. Each series is divided into several rounds, each held in a different country. It was replaced in 2021 by the UCI Track Cycling Nations Cup.

== Format ==
The UCI Track Cycling World Cup is a key event within the Track Cycling calendar, with only the World Championships and the Olympic Games attracting more World Ranking points.

The series is open to national teams and registered trade teams who compete over a number of track cycling disciplines. The overall classification is decided on a points system with riders or teams amassing points in each discipline competed during each round of the series. The rider or team that has the greatest number of points in each discipline wears a white jersey in that discipline in the following round to denote their status as leader. The World Cup trophy is presented to the nation with the greatest number of points in each discipline at the end of the final round of the series.

The inaugural round of the UCI Track Cycling World Cup Classics (as it was then known) was held in Copenhagen, Denmark in May 1993. The series is held over a track cycling season which was initially between February and June of each year; however since 2004–05 this has changed to between October and February. The number of rounds within each series has varied each year but has generally been between 3 and 6 rounds.

The name UCI Track Cycling World Cup was adopted from the 2011–12 series.

== Hosts ==
Times hosted
Hosts	Editions hosted
United Kingdom	16
Colombia	15
Australia	11
Mexico	9
United States	8
Russia	7
Italy	6
China	5
Germany	4
Hong Kong, Denmark, Canada, Greece	3
France, New Zealand, Poland, Malaysia	2
Cuba, Ecuador, Netherlands, Kazakhstan; Belarus, Chile, South Africa, Spain, Japan	1

== History ==
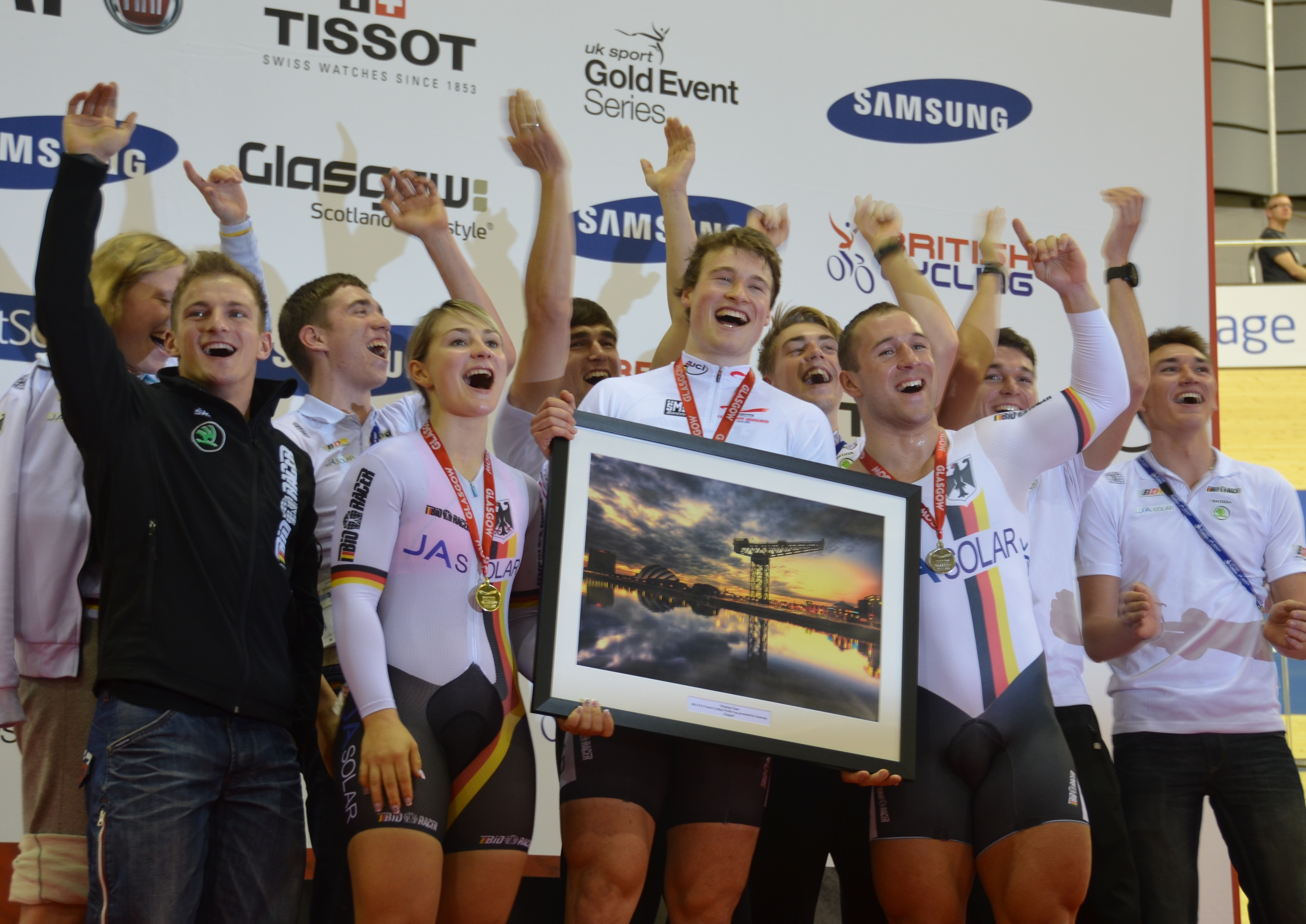
The German team (pictured in Glasgow) won the World Cup trophy in 2012–13

A summary of the World Cup trophy winning nations by year is shown below:

Number	Series	Rounds	Events	Winning Nation
1	1993	3	39	France
2	1994	4	52	Germany
3	1995	6	72	France
4	1996	5	72	France
5	1997	6	72	France
6	1998	4	48	Germany
7	1999	5	60	France
8	2000	5	60	France
9	2001	5	60	Germany
10	2002	5	75	United States
11	2003	4	64	Germany
12	2004	4	64	Germany
13	2004–05	4	60	Netherlands
14	2005–06	4	60	Netherlands
15	2006–07	4	64	Netherlands

Number	Series	Rounds	Events	Winning Nation
16	2007–08	4	68	Netherlands
17	2008–09	5	85	Germany
18	2009–10	4	68	Germany
19	2010–11	4	49	France
20	2011–12	4	58	Germany
21	2012–13	3	39	Germany
22	2013–14	3	48	Great Britain
23	2014–15	3	34	Germany
24	2015–16	3	41	Great Britain
25	2016–17	4	58	France
26	2017–18	5	76	Germany
27	2018–19	6	84	Australia
28	2019–20	6	83	Poland

== See also ==
- UCI Track Cycling Nations Cup
