= Nancy Contreras =

Mexican cyclist (born 1978)

Personal information
- Born: January 20, 1978 (age 48) Ciudad de México, Distrito Federal
Medal record
Women's track cycling
Representing Mexico
World Championships
Gold medal – first place	2001 Antwerp	500m time trial
Silver medal – second place	2002 Ballerup	500m time trial
Silver medal – second place	2003 Stuttgart	500m time trial
Bronze medal – third place	2003 Stuttgart	Sprint
Pan American Games
Gold medal – first place	2003 Santo Domingo	500m time trial
Silver medal – second place	1999 Winnipeg	500m time trial
Bronze medal – third place	1995 Mar del Plata	Sprint
Bronze medal – third place	2011 Guadalajara	Sprint
Central American and Caribbean Games
Gold medal – first place	2002 San Salvador	500m time trial
Silver medal – second place	2002 San Salvador	Sprint
Silver medal – second place	2006 Cartagena	500m time trial
Bronze medal – third place	2002 San Salvador	Keirin
Bronze medal – third place	2006 Cartagena	Sprint
Bronze medal – third place	2006 Cartagena	Keirin

Nancy Yareli Contreras Reyes (born January 20, 1978, in Ciudad de México, Distrito Federal) is a female track cyclist from Mexico, who represented her native country twice at the Summer Olympics: 1996 and 2004. She won a bronze medal in the 1995 Pan American Games in Mar del Plata, Argentina.

Contreras won the 500m time trial gold during the 1998 Central American and Caribbean Games, but failed the doping control with Pseudoephedrine and her medal was removed.

== Major results ==
1995
UCI Juniors Track World Championships

2nd Individual pursuit

1999
Track Cycling World Cup Classics

2nd 500m time trial, Round 1, Mexico City
3rd 500m time trial, Round 3, Valencia
3rd 500m time trial, final individual ranking

Pan American Games

2nd 500m time trial

2000
Track Cycling World Cup Classics

1st, 500m time trial, Round 3, Mexico City

2001
UCI Track Cycling World Championships

1st 500m time trial

Track Cycling World Cup Classics

1st Sprint, Round 4, Mexico City
1st 500m time trial, Round 4, Mexico City
2nd 500m time trial, Round 1, Cali

2002
UCI Track Cycling World Championships

2nd 500m time trial

Track Cycling World Cup Classics

2nd 500m time trial, Round 1, Monterrey
3rd 500m time trial, Round 2, Sydney

2003
UCI Track Cycling World Championships

2nd 500m time trial
3rd Sprint

Track Cycling World Cup Classics

2nd 500m time trial, Round 2, Aguascalientes
3rd Sprint, Round 2, Aguascalientes
1st 500m time trial, Round 3, Cape Town
1st 500m time trial, Round 4, Sydney
1st Sprint, Round 4, Sydney
1st 500m time trial, final individual ranking

Pan American Games

1st 500m time trial

2005
Pan American Championships

2nd 500m time trial

2007
Pan American Road and Track Championships

3rd Keirin

2011
Pan American Road and Track Championships

3rd Team Sprint (with Luz Daniela Gaxiola Gonzalez)

2012
Mexican National Track Championships

1st Scratch race
2nd 500m time trial
2nd Keirin
3rd Team pursuit (with Belem Guerrero and Carolina Rodríguez)
