= Liudmyla Vypyrailo =

Ukrainian cyclist

Personal information
- Born: 19 July 1979 (age 47) Simferopol, Ukrainian SSR, Soviet Union

Cycling career
- Sport: Cycling
- Discipline: Track
- Role: Rider
Medal record
Representing Ukraine
Women's track cycling
UCI Track World Championships
Bronze medal – third place	2005 Los Angeles	Scratch

Liudmyla Vypyrailo (born 19 July 1979) is a Ukrainian former track cyclist. She competed in the women's points race at the 2004 Summer Olympics.
