= Christina Becker =

German bicycle racer (born 1977)

Personal information
- Born: 12 December 1977 (age 48) Dortmund, Germany

Cycling career
- Sport: Cycling
- Discipline: Track cycling
- Role: Rider
- Rider type: endurance

Christina Becker (born 12 December 1977 in Dortmund) is a German female track cyclist, and part of the national team. She competed in the team pursuit event at the 2009 UCI Track Cycling World Championships.

Her younger sister Charlotte Becker is also a track cyclist and competed together with her in the team pursuit.
