= Mira Kasslin =

Finnish cyclist

Personal information
- Born: 26 January 1978 (age 48) Helsinki, Finland

Cycling career
- Sport: Cycling

Mira Kasslin (born 26 January 1978) is a Finnish cyclist. She competed at the 1996 Summer Olympics and the 2000 Summer Olympics.
