= Tanya Dubnicoff =

Canadian cyclist

Personal information
- Born: November 7, 1969 (age 56) Winnipeg, Manitoba, Canada
- Height: 170 cm (5 ft 7 in)

Cycling career
- Sport: Cycling
- Discipline: Track
- Role: Rider
- Rider type: Sprinter
Medal record
Women's track cycling
Representing Canada
UCI Track World Championships
Gold medal – first place	1993 Hamar	Sprint
Silver medal – second place	1998 Bordeaux	500 m time trial
Bronze medal – third place	1998 Bordeaux	Sprint
Bronze medal – third place	1999 Berlin	Sprint
Pan American Games
Gold medal – first place	1991 Havana	Sprint
Gold medal – first place	1995 Mar del Plata	Sprint
Gold medal – first place	1999 Winnipeg	Sprint
Gold medal – first place	1999 Winnipeg	500 m time trial

Tanya Dubnicoff (born November 7, 1969, in Winnipeg, Manitoba) is a Canadian cycling coach and retired track cyclist. She won four gold medals at the Pan American Games in addition to winning the world sprint championships in 1993. She represented Canada at three consecutive Summer Olympics: 1992 in Barcelona, 1996 in Atlanta and 2000 in Sydney. Dubnicoff retired in 2000.

She was inducted into the Manitoba Sports Hall of Fame and Museum in 2002. Dubnicoff was inducted into Cycling Canada's Hall of Fame in 2015.

== Coaching ==
Dubnicoff was named as Cycling Canada's Advancement Camp Coach based out of Calgary to start January 1, 2022. Previously, Dubnicoff was a National Team head coach with Cycling Canada from 2011 to 2013, helping Canada to a bronze medal in Women's Team Pursuit at the 2012 Summer Olympics in London.
