= Alison Wright (cyclist) =

Australian cyclist

Personal information
- Born: 2 November 1980 (age 46) Australia

Cycling career
- Sport: Cycling
- Disciplines: Road cycling, Track cycling

Professional teams
- 2003: Road Runner Guerciotti
- 2004–2005: Nobili Rubinetterie-Guerciotti
Medal record
Representing Australia
Women's road bicycle racing
Commonwealth Games
Bronze medal – third place	2002 Manchester	Individual pursuit

Alison Wright (born 2 November 1980) is a track and road cyclist from Australia. She represented her nation at 2002 Commonwealth Games and won a bronze medal in the 3000m Individual Pursuit. She rode at the 2001 and 2003 Track Cycling World Championships and also rode at the 1999, 2000, 2002, 2003 and 2004 UCI Road World Championships, where her best result was 5th place in the road race in Zolder, 2002.
