= Jiang Cuihua =

Chinese cyclist (born 1975)

Personal information
- Born: 2 February 1975 (age 51) Dalian, China
- Height: 5 ft 9 in (175 cm)
- Weight: 78 kg (172 lb)

Cycling career
- Sport: Cycling
Medal record
Representing China
Women's track cycling
Olympic Games
Bronze medal – third place	2000 Sydney	500 m time trial
UCI Track World Championships
Silver medal – second place	1999 Antwerp	500 m time trial
Silver medal – second place	2000 Manchester	500 m time trial
Bronze medal – third place	2003 Stuttgart	500 m time trial

Jiang Cuihua (Chinese: 姜翠华; born 2 February 1975) is a former Chinese cyclist. She competed in the track time trial at the 2000 Summer Olympics where she won a bronze medal.
