= Szilvia Szabolcsi =

Hungarian cyclist

Personal information
- Born: 12 October 1977 (age 49) Budapest, Hungary

Cycling career
- Sport: Cycling

Szilvia Szabolcsi (born 12 October 1977) is a Hungarian cyclist. She competed in two events at the 2000 Summer Olympics.
