= Salvador Meliá =

Spanish cyclist (born 1977)

Personal information
- Born: 1 April 1977 (age 49) Valencia, Spain

Cycling career
- Sport: Cycling
- Discipline: Track
- Role: Rider
Medal record
Men's track cycling
Representing Spain
World Championships
Silver medal – second place	2004 Melbourne	Team Sprint
Bronze medal – third place	2000 Manchester	Team Sprint

Salvador Meliá (born 1 April 1977) is a Spanish former track cyclist. He competed at the 2000 Summer Olympics and the 2004 Summer Olympics.
