= Joan Llaneras =

Spanish cyclist

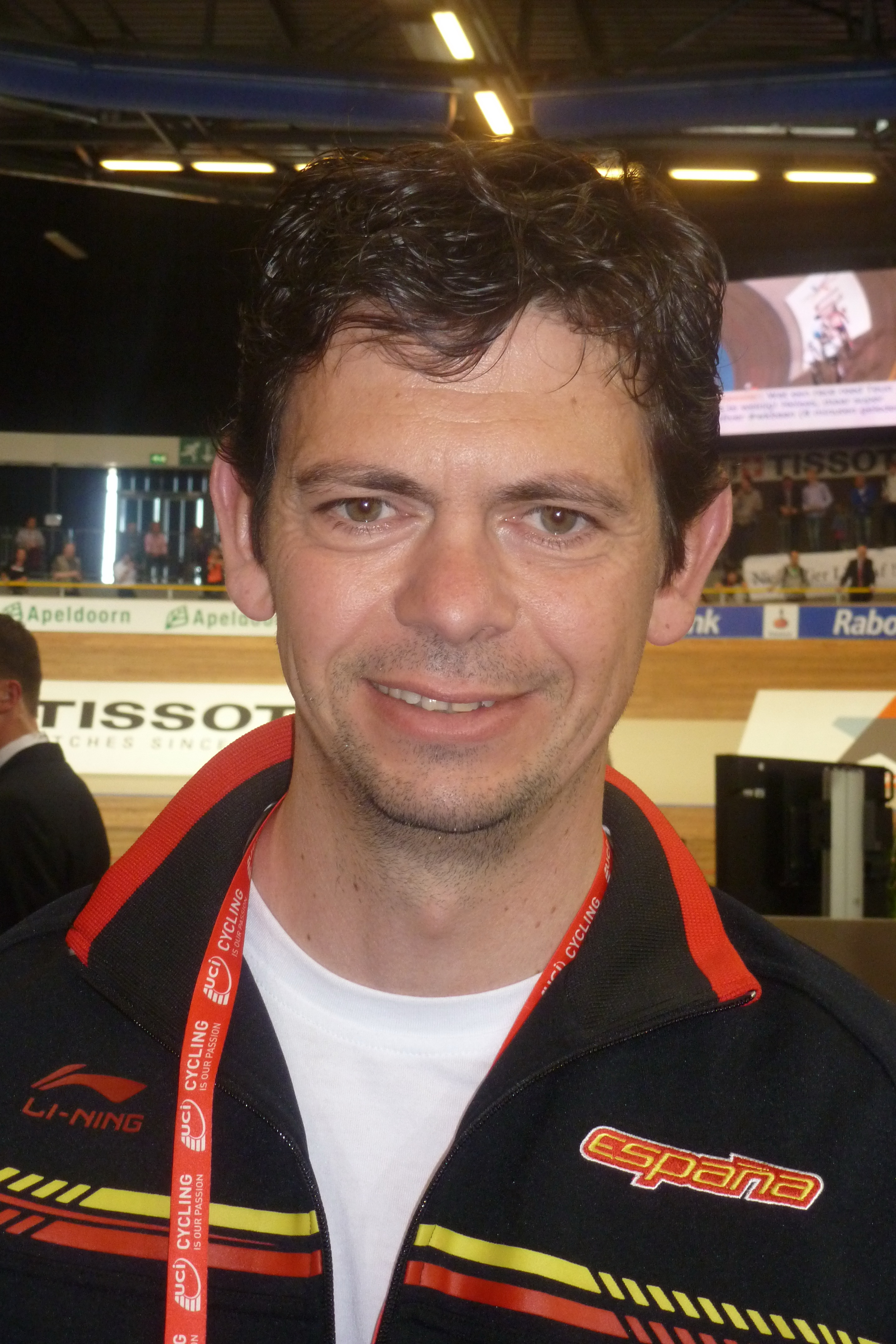
- Llaneras in 2011

Personal information
- Full name: Joan Llaneras Rosselló
- Born: 17 May 1969 (age 57) Porreres, Spain
- Height: 5 ft 11 in (1.80 m)
- Weight: 143 lb (65 kg)

Cycling career
- Sport: Cycling
- Discipline: Track
- Role: Rider
- Rider type: Madison and points

Professional teams
- 1991–1995: ONCE
- 1998: U.S. Postal Service
Medal record
Representing Spain
Men's track cycling
Olympic Games
Gold medal – first place	2000 Sydney	Points race
Gold medal – first place	2008 Beijing	Points race
Silver medal – second place	2004 Athens	Points race
Silver medal – second place	2008 Beijing	Madison
World Championships
Gold medal – first place	1996 Manchester	Points race
Gold medal – first place	1997 Perth	Madison
Gold medal – first place	1998 Bordeaux	Points race
Gold medal – first place	1999 Berlin	Madison
Gold medal – first place	2000 Manchester	Points race
Gold medal – first place	2006 Bordeaux	Madison
Gold medal – first place	2007 Palma de Mallorca	Points race
Silver medal – second place	2000 Manchester	Madison
Silver medal – second place	2001 Antwerp	Madison
Silver medal – second place	2003 Stuttgart	Points race
Bronze medal – third place	1997 Perth	Points race
Bronze medal – third place	2005 Los Angeles	Points race

Joan Llaneras Rosselló (born 17 May 1969) is a Spanish former track cyclist. He specialises in the madison and points race events.

Llaneras began his cycling career on the road with the ONCE professional cycling team but switched to concentrate on track cycling. Llaneras is a four-time world champion in the points race and three-time champion in the Madison. He is a double Olympic champion, winning the event at the 2000 Summer Olympics in Sydney and in Beijing in 2008.

Llaneras teamed up with Isaac Gálvez to compete on the lucrative Six Days of Ghent racing circuit in November 2006. It resulted with the death of Gálvez after colliding with Dimitri De Fauw and hitting the railings. Llaneras had decided to quit cycling, but a few months later in an interview with Spanish daily newspaper Marca, he said:

"Clearly I thought about leaving it all. It was the first reaction. Logical... Natural... Normal after what had happened, but life goes on, and giving it all up, unfortunately, will not solve anything. In addition, the track is my life, is my dream, my family, it is almost everything to me."

He returned to competition in 2007, and although he had no intention of returning to Madison racing, Llaneras teamed up with Antonio Tauler to take the silver medal in the Madison at the 2008 Summer Olympics, adding to the gold he won in the points race three days earlier. In doing so, he became the Spaniard with the most Olympic medals ever, with 2 gold and 2 silver to his name. After the Beijing Olympics, Llaneras retired.

== Major results ==
1991
2nd GP Libération (NED)

1993
1st Stage 1, Vuelta a Andalucia (Ruta del Sol), Chicania (ESP)

1994
2nd Platja d'Aro (ESP)
1st Trofeo Mallorca (ESP)

1995
1st Platja d'Aro (ESP)

1996
1st Points race, World Track Championships

1997
1st Madison, World Track Championships (with Miquel Alzamora Riera)
3rd Points race, World Track Championships
3rd Medellin, Six Days (COL)
3rd Zürich, Six Days (SUI)

1998
3rd Alconbendas (ESP)
2nd Cali, Madison, Cali (COL)
1st Cali, Points race, Cali (COL)
2nd Victoria, Madison, Victoria (CAN)
1st Points race, World Track Championships

1999
1st Madison, World Track Championships (with Isaac Gálvez)
3rd Six-Days of Grenoble (FRA)
1st Mexico City, Madison (MEX) (with Miquel Alzamora Riera)
3rd Cali, Team Pursuit, Cali (COL)
1st Cali, Madison, Cali (COL) (with Miquel Alzamora Riera)

2000
1st Points race, World Track Championships
2nd Madison, World Track Championships
2nd Zaragoza (ESP)
2nd Zürich, Six Days (SUI)
1st Olympic Games, Track, Points race, Elite, Sydney
2nd Buenos-Aires Six Days (ARG)
1st Six-Days of Grenoble (FRA) (with Isaac Gálvez

2001
2nd Madison, World Track Championships
2nd Hof (GER)

2003
2nd Points race, World Track Championships
2nd Moscou, Points race (RUS)
2nd Aguascalientes, Madison (MEX)
3rd Cape Town, Madison (RSA)

2004
1st Manchester, Points race (GBR)
1st Points race, Spanish National Track Championships - U23
2nd Sydney, Madison (AUS)
3rd Sydney, Points race (AUS)
2nd Points race, Olympic Games

2005
3rd Points race, World Track Championships

2006
1st Madison, World Track Championships (with Isaac Gálvez)
3rd Los Angeles, Points race (USA)
3rd Madison, Spanish National Track Championships
2nd Amsterdam, Six Days (NED)

2007
1st Points race, World Track Championships
3rd Fiorenzuola d' Arda, Six Days (ITA)
2nd Madison, Sydney (AUS)

2008
1st Points race, Olympic Games
2nd Madison, Olympic Games
