= Wang Yan (cyclist) =

Chinese cyclist

Personal information
- Born: 24 August 1974 (age 52)

Cycling career
- Sport: Cycling

Wang Yan (born 24 August 1974) is a Chinese former cyclist. She competed at the 1992, 1996 and the 2000 Summer Olympics.
