= Olga Slyusareva =

Russian cyclist

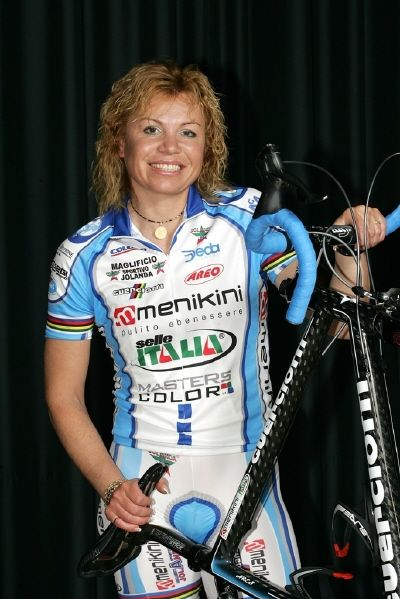

Personal information
- Full name: Olga Anatolyevna Slyusareva
- Born: 28 April 1969 (age 57) Chervonyi Donets, Ukrainian SSR

Cycling career
- Sport: Cycling
- Disciplines: Road and track
- Role: Rider

Professional teams
- 2000: Acca Due O-Lorena Camichie
- 2001–2002: Carpe Diem-Itera
- 2003: Velodames-Colnago
- 2004–2005: Nobili Rubinetterie
- 2007: Fenixs-HPB
- 2008: Menikini-Selle Italia-Master Colors
Medal record
Representing Russia
Women's road cycling
Olympic Games
Bronze medal – third place	2004 Athens	Road race
Women's track cycling
Olympic Games
Gold medal – first place	2004 Athens	Points race
Bronze medal – third place	2000 Sydney	Points race
UCI Track World Championships
Silver medal – second place	1995 Bogota	Sprint

Olga Anatolyevna Slyusareva (Russian: Ольга Анатольевна Слюсарева) (born 28 April 1969 in Chervonyi Donets, Ukrainian SSR) is a Russian professional racing cyclist. She won a gold medal at the 2004 Olympic Games in the points race, bronze medal at the 2000 Olympic Games in the points race, and at the 2004 Olympic Games in the road race. Since 2019, she is the Mayor of Tula, a city about 193 km (120 mi) South of Moscow.

== Major results ==
1995
2nd, World Championship, Track, Sprint, Elite, Bogotá
1998
1st, European Championship, Track Omnium
3rd, World Championship, Track, Points race, Elite, Bordeaux
2nd, World Cup, Track, Points race, Victoria, British Columbia
1999
1st, European Championship, Track Omnium
3rd, National Championship, Road, Elite, Russia
3rd, World Cup, Track, Points race, Mexico City
1st, World Cup, Track, Points race, Frisco, Texas
2000
3rd, Olympic Summer Games, Track, Points race, Sydney
3rd, World Championship, Track, Points race, Elite, Manchester
2001
1st, European Championship, Track Omnium
1st, Stage 4, Tour de l'Aude Cycliste Féminin
1st, Stage 10, Tour de l'Aude Cycliste Féminin
2nd, World Championship, Track, Pursuit, Elite, Antwerp
1st, World Championship, Track, Points race, Elite, Antwerp
1st, Trophée International
2002
3rd, National Championship, Road, Elite, Russia
2nd, World Championship, Track, Pursuit, Elite, Copenhagen
1st, World Championship, Track, Points race, Elite, Copenhagen
3rd, World Championship, Track, Scratch, Elite, Copenhagen
1st, World Cup, Track, Scratch, Moscow
2nd, World Cup, Track, Pursuit, Moscow
1st, World Cup, Track, Points race, Moscow
6th UCI Road World Championships – Women's time trial
2003
1st, Stage 3, Eko Tour Dookola Polski
1st, Stage 4, Eko Tour Dookola Polski
3rd, General Classification, Eko Tour Dookola Polski
1st, European Championship, Track Omnium
3rd, World Championship, Track, Pursuit, Elite, Stuttgart
1st, World Championship, Track, Points race, Elite, Stuttgart
1st, World Championship, Track, Scratch, Elite, Stuttgart
2004
1st, World Championship, Track, Points race, Elite, Melbourne
3rd, World Championship, Track, Scratch, Elite, Melbourne
1st, World Cup, Track, Points race, Moscow
2nd, World Cup, Track, Pursuit, Moscow
1st, World Cup, Track, Scratch, Moscow
1st, GP Liberazione
1st, Stage 7, Giro d'Italia Femminile, Oggiono
3rd, Olympic Summer Games, Road, Athens
1st, Olympic Summer Games, Track, Points race, Athens
2005
2nd, World Championship, Track, Points race, Elite, Los Angeles
1st, World Championship, Track, Scratch, Elite, Los Angeles
2nd, National Championship, Road, Elite, Russia, Moscow
1st, European Championship, Track Omnium, Fiorenzuola
1st, World Cup, Track, Points race, Moscow
3rd, World Cup, Track, Pursuit, Moscow
2006
2nd, World Championship, Track, Pursuit, Elite, Bordeaux
2nd, World Championship, Track, Points race, Elite, Bordeaux
3rd, World Championship, Track, Scratch, Elite, Bordeaux
3rd, Berner Rundfahrt, Bern
3rd, GP Liberazione
1st, Trofeo Riviera Della Versilia
2nd, Giro del Friuli
1st, National Championship, Road, ITT, Elite, Russia, Penza
1st, National Championship, Road, Elite, Russia, Penza
1st, Stage 3, Giro d'Italia Femminile, Marciano
1st, Stage 4, Giro d'Italia Femminile, Arezzo
1st, Stage 6, Giro d'Italia Femminile, Novi Ligure
2007
1st, World Cup, Track, Team Pursuit, Sydney
2nd, World Cup, Track, Team Pursuit, Beijing
2008
2nd, World Cup, Track, Team Pursuit, Los Angeles
