= Kathrin Freitag =

German cyclist (born 1974)

Personal information
- Born: 16 April 1974 (age 52)

Cycling career
- Sport: Cycling

Kathrin Freitag (born 16 April 1974) is a German former cyclist. She competed in the women's 500 metres time trial at the 2000 Summer Olympics.
