= Oksana Grishina (cyclist) =

Russian cyclist

Personal information
- Born: November 27, 1968 (age 57) Tula, Russia

Cycling career
- Sport: Cycling
- Discipline: Track
Medal record
Summer Olympics
Silver medal – second place	2000 Sydney	Women's track time trial

Oksana Grishina (also spelled Oxana Grichina) (Russian: Окса́на Гри́шина; born 27 November 1968 in Tula, Russia) is a Russian track cyclist.

Grishina competed in the 1996 Summer Olympics in Atlanta and came 5th in the women's sprint event. She also competed at the 2000 Summer Olympics in Sydney where she won a silver medal in the women's sprint event and came 15th in the women's track time trial events.
