= René Wolff =

German cyclist (born 1978)

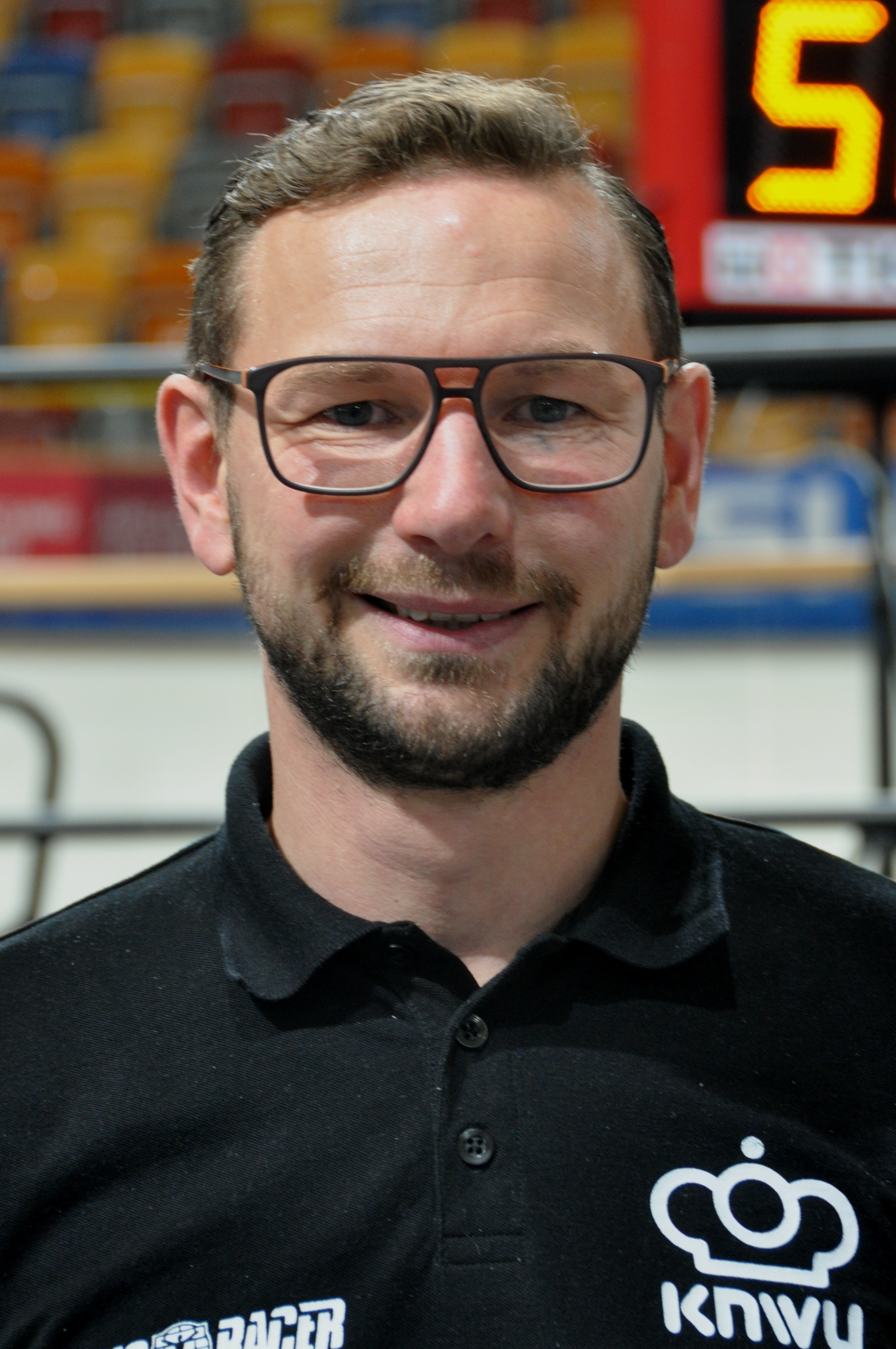
- Wolff in 2016

Personal information
- Full name: René Wolff
- Born: 4 April 1978 (age 48) Erfurt, East Germany

Cycling career
- Sport: Cycling
- Discipline: Track
- Role: Rider
- Rider type: Sprinter
Medal record
Representing Germany
Men's track cycling
Olympic Games
Gold medal – first place	2004 Athens	Team sprint
Bronze medal – third place	2004 Athens	Sprint
World Championships
Gold medal – first place	2005 Los Angeles	Sprint
Gold medal – first place	2003 Stuttgart	Team sprint
Bronze medal – third place	2005 Los Angeles	Team sprint
Bronze medal – third place	2003 Stuttgart	Sprint
Bronze medal – third place	2002 Copenhagen	Keirin

René Wolff (born 4 April 1978) is an Olympic and world champion track cyclist from Germany.

Wolff specializes in the sprint, team sprint and keirin events and teamed up with multiple Olympic champion Jens Fiedler and Stefan Nimke to win the gold medal in the team sprint event at the 2004 Summer Olympics.

Since 2010 René Wolff is the national coach of the Dutch track cycling team.
