= Tanya Lindenmuth =

American cyclist

Personal information
- Born: May 25, 1979 (age 47) Allentown, Pennsylvania, U.S.

Sport
- Country: United States
- Sport: Cycling
Medal record
Representing United States
Pan American Games
Gold medal – first place	2003 Santo Domingo	Sprint
Gold medal – first place	2003 Santo Domingo	Keirin

Tanya Lindenmuth (born May 25, 1979) is an American cyclist. She competed at the 2000 Summer Olympics in Sydney, in the women's sprint. Lindenmuth was born in Allentown, Pennsylvania.
