= Katrin Meinke =

German cyclist

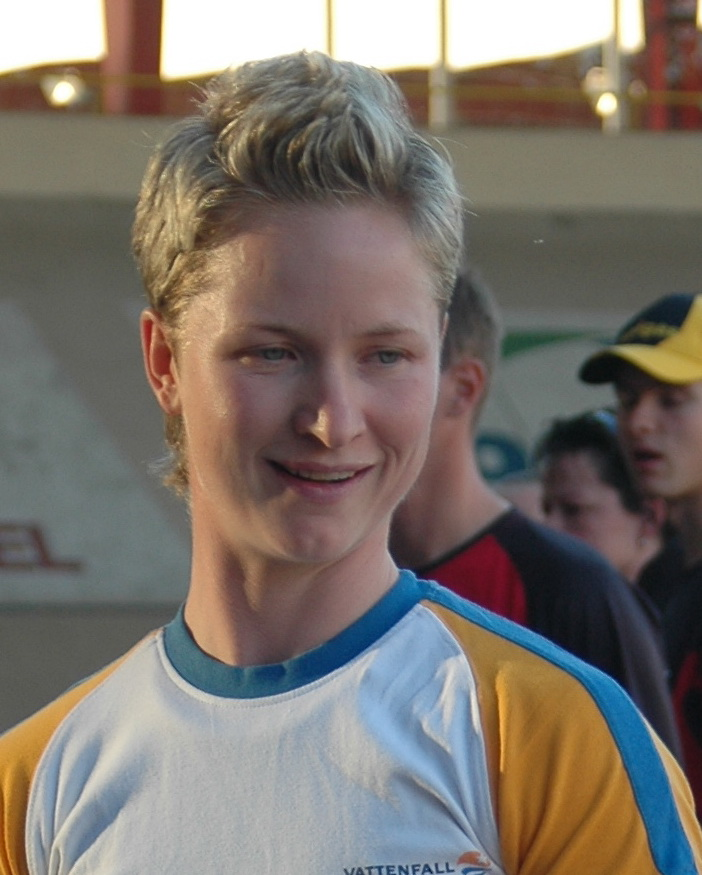

Personal information
- Nationality: German
- Born: 19 September 1979 (age 45)

Sport
- Sport: Cycling
- Event(s): Sprint; 500 metres Time Trial; Points Race

Katrin Meinke (born 19 September 1979) is a German bicyclist. She competed in the women's sprint cycling, points race and track time trial at the 2004 Summer Olympics.
