= Iryna Yanovych =

Ukrainian cyclist

Personal information
- Full name: Iryna Yanovych
- Born: July 14, 1976 (age 50) Amur, Russian SFSR, Soviet Union

Cycling career
- Sport: Cycling
- Discipline: Track
- Role: Rider
- Rider type: Sprinter
Medal record
Representing Ukraine
Women's track cycling
Olympic Games
Bronze medal – third place	2000 Sydney	Sprint

Iryna Yanovych (born 14 July 1976) is a Ukrainian track cyclist who competed at the 2000 Summer Olympics in Sydney, winning a bronze medal in the sprint event.
