= French National Track Championships =

Cycling competition

The French National Track Championships are held annually and are composed of competitions of various track cycling disciplines across various age and gender categories.

== Men ==
=== Senior ===
Year	Gold	Silver	Bronze
Individual pursuit
1992	Philippe Ermenault	Pascal Potié	Jean-Yves Mancais
1993	Philippe Ermenault	Eddy Seigneur	Francis Moreau
1994	Philippe Ermenault	Francis Moreau	Samuel Renaux
1995	Philippe Ermenault	Francis Moreau	Cyril Bos
1996	Philippe Ermenault	Cyril Bos	Jérôme Neuville
1997	Philippe Ermenault	Jérôme Neuville	Franck Perque
1998	Florian Rousseau	Philippe Ermenault	Jérôme Neuville
1999	Philippe Ermenault	Francis Moreau	Jérôme Neuville
2000	Philippe Gaumont	Jérôme Neuville	Philippe Ermenault
2001	Jérôme Neuville	Damien Pommereau	Cyril Bos
2002	Philippe Gaumont	Jérôme Neuville	Cyril Bos
2003	Jérôme Neuville	Franck Perque	Fabien Sanchez
2004	Fabien Sanchez	Anthony Langella	Damien Monier
2005	Damien Monier	Fabien Sanchez	Jonathan Mouchel
2006	Jonathan Mouchel	François Lamiraud	Sébastien Thomas
2007	Fabien Sanchez	Benoît Daeninck	Sébastien Thomas
2008	Damien Monier	Maxime Bouet	Fabien Sanchez
2009	Damien Gaudin	Julien Duval	Jérôme Cousin
2010	Damien Gaudin	Julien Morice	Julien Duval
1 km time trial
2000	Arnaud Tournant	Hervé Thuet	Arnaud Duble
2003	Mickaël Bourgain	Arnaud Tournant	Mathieu Mandard
2004	Arnaud Tournant	Sébastien Notin	Hervé Gane
2005	François Pervis	Sébastien Henriette	Sébastien Notin
2006	François Pervis	Kévin Sireau	Michaël D'Almeida
2007	François Pervis	Didier Henriette	Sébastien Henriette
2008	Michaël D'Almeida	Ghislain Boiron	Adrien Doucet
2009	François Pervis	Quentin Lafargue	Charlie Conord
2010	Quentin Lafargue	Thomas Bonafos	Florian Vernay
Sprint
1881	Frédéric de Civry		
1882	Frédéric de Civry		
1883	Paul Medinger		
1884	Paul Medinger		
1885	Paul Medinger		
1887	Paul Medinger		
1891	Paul Medinger		
1892	Georges Cassignard		
1893	Paul Medinger		
1896	Edmond Jacquelin		
1898	Ludovic Morin		
1899	Paul Bourillon		
1900	Edmond Jacquelin		
1902	Edmond Jacquelin		
1903	Victor Thuau		
1904	Emile Friol		
1905	Gabriel Poulain		
1906	Emile Friol		
1907	Emile Friol		
1908	Léon Hourlier		
1909	Victor Dupré		
1910	Emile Friol		
1911	Léon Hourlier		
1912	André Perchicot		
1913	Emile Friol		
1914	Léon Hourlier		
1922	Gabriel Poulain		
1923	Maurice Schilles		
1924	Gabriel Poulain		
1925	Lucien Michard		
1927	Lucien Michard		
1928	Lucien Michard		
1929	Lucien Michard		
1930	Lucien Michard		
1931	Lucien Faucheux		
1932	Louis Gerardin		
1933	Lucien Michard		
1934	Lucien Michard		
1935	Lucien Michard		
1936	Louis Gerardin		
1937	Louis Chaillot		
1938	Louis Gerardin		
1939	Guy Renaudin		
1941	Louis Gerardin		
1942	Louis Gerardin		
1943	Louis Gerardin		
1946	Louis Gerardin		
1947	Georges Senfftleben		
1948	Georges Senfftleben		
1949	Louis Gerardin		
1953	Jacques Bellenger		
1954	Jacques Bellenger		
1955	Jacques Bellenger		
1956	Roger Gaignard		
1957	Roger Gaignard		
1958	Roger Gaignard		
1959	Michel Rousseau		
1960	Michel Rousseau		
1961	Michel Rousseau		
1962	Michel Rousseau		
1963	Roger Gaignard		
1964	Roger Gaignard		
1965	Roger Gaignard		
1966	Bernard Charreau	Roger Gaignard	Christian Gastadi
1967	Michel Rousseau	André Gruchet	Bernard Charreau
1970	Cyrille Guimard	Gérard Billard	Christian Davaine
1976	Serge Aubey	Jean-Jacques Fussien	Jean-François Pescheux
1977	Serge Aubey	Jean-Jacques Fussien	Jean-Louis Danguillaume
1980	Daniël Morelon		Alain Patritti
1981	Francis Castaing		
1982	Yavé Cahard	Francis Castaing	Yvon Bertin
1985	Yavé Cahard	Philippe Vernet	Patrick Da Rocha
1986	Patrick Da Rocha	Dominique Lecrocq	Philippe Lauraire
1992	Frédéric Magné	Hervé Robert Thuet	Frédéric Lancien
1993	Fabrice Colas	Florian Rousseau	Frédéric Magné
1994	Frédéric Magné	Florian Rousseau	Fabrice Colas
1995	Florian Rousseau	Vincent Le Quellec	Frédéric Lancien
1996	Florian Rousseau	Frédéric Magné	Hervé Robert Thuet
1997	Florian Rousseau	Arnaud Tournant	Frédéric Magné
1998	Florian Rousseau	Vincent Le Quellec	
1999	Laurent Gané	Arnaud Tournant	Frédéric Magné
2000	Florian Rousseau	Laurent Gané	Frédéric Magné
2001	Laurent Gané	Florian Rousseau	Arnaud Tournant
2002	Laurent Gané	Arnaud Tournant	Florian Rousseau
2003	Laurent Gané	Mickaël Bourgain	Arnaud Tournant
2004	Laurent Gané	Arnaud Tournant	Mickaël Bourgain
2005	Arnaud Tournant	Mickaël Bourgain	Hervé Gané
2006	Kévin Sireau	Grégory Baugé	Arnaud Tournant
2007	Grégory Baugé	Kévin Sireau	Mickaël Bourgain
2008	Kevin Guillot	Julien Palma	Sébastien Marques
2009	Grégory Baugé	Kévin Sireau	Mickaël Bourgain
2010	Kévin Sireau	Mickaël Bourgain	Adrien Doucet
Keirin
1998	Florian Rousseau		
2000	Frédéric Magné	Florian Rousseau	Laurent Gané
2001	Vincent Le Quellec		
2003	Laurent Gané	Mickaël Bourgain	John Giletto
2004	Mickaël Bourgain	Hervé Gane	Sébastien Henriette
2005	Mickaël Bourgain	Arnaud Tournant	Sébastien Notin
2006	Kévin Sireau	Sébastien Notin	Mickaël Bourgain
2007	Grégory Baugé	Didier Henriette	François Pervis
2008	Charlie Conord	Thomas Bonafos	Thierry Jollet
2009	Mickaël Bourgain	Grégory Baugé	Kévin Sireau
2010	Kévin Sireau	Adrien Doucet	Quentin Lafargue
Points race
1996	Philippe Ermenault		
1997	Philippe Ermenault		
2000	Franck Perque	Philippe Ermenault	Laurent Genty
2001		Sylvain Anquetil	
2002		Sylvain Anquetil	
2003	Nicolas Meunier	Anthony Langella	Nicolas Reynaud
2004	Benoît Genauzeau	Franck Champeymont	Damien Pommereau
2005	Anthony Langella		
2006	Franck Perque	Alexandre Blain	Sylvain Anquetil
2007	Benoît Daeninck	Fabien Sanchez	François Lamiraud
2008	Fabien Sanchez	Kilian Patour	Damien Gaudin
2009	Vivien Brisse	Benoît Daeninck	Guillaume Perrot
2010	Morgan Kneisky	Kévin Lalouette	Benoît Daeninck
2019	Louis Pijourlet	Corentin Ermenault	Joffrey Degueurce
Scratch
2008	Romain Sicard	Guillaume Perrot	Mathieu Delaroziere
2009	Morgan Kneisky	Julien Duval	Jonathan Mouchel
2010	Laurent Pichon	Morgan Lamoisson	Julien Duval

==== Team sprint ====
Year	Gold	Silver	Bronze
2000	Côte d'Azur; Barelli, Mickaël Bourgain, Lancien	Lyonnais; Fremion, Giletto, Notin	Flandre-Artois; Tournant, Janowski, Tournant
2001	Lyonnais		
2005		Sébastien Henriette	
2006			Didier Henriette, Sébastien Henriette
2007	Kenny Cyprien, Charlie Connord & Thierry Jollet	Axel Sevieri, Thomas Bonafos & Didier Henriette	Benjamin Bury, Yann Zoonekyndt & Alexandre Volant
2008	Julien Palma, Sébastien Marques & Alexandre Piat	Sullivan Clet, Faustin Mandil & Florian Vernay	Kévin Guillot, Guillaume Labat & Judicaël Le Champion
2009	Brittany; Vincent Picaud, Kévin Guillot, Judicaël Le Champion	Orléanais; Marc Sarreau, Julien Palma, Sébastien Marques	Provence; Michaël Valenza, Sébastien Court, Guillaume Gonzalez
2010	Région Centre; Sebastien Marques, Julien Palma & Victor Palma	Île-de-France; Erwann Aubernon, Benjamin Edelin & Dany Maffeïs	Brittany; Kévin Guillot, Kévin Le Sellin & Vincent Picaud

==== Team pursuit ====
Year	Gold	Silver	Bronze
2000	Cofidis; Philippe Gaumont, Robert Sassone, Francis Moreau & Damien Pommereau	Normandy; Sylvain Anquetil, Cyril Bos, David Hubschwerlin & Fabien Merciris	Picardy; Franck Perque, Christophe Capelle, Philippe Ermenault & Vincent Socquin
2004	Aquitaine; Fabien Patanchon, Mathieu Ladagnous, Cédric Agez, Mickaël Delage & Jonathan Mouchel	Normandy; Vincent Soquin, Fabien Merciris, Cyril Bos & Yves Delarue	Orléanais; Nicolas Rousseau, François Lamiraud, Michaël Chaussard & Damien Tristant
2005	Mathieu Ladagnous, Anthony Langella, Fabien Sanchez & Mickaël Malle	Jonathan Mouchel, Cédric Agez, Fabien Patanchon & Yannick Marie	Mathieu Babin, Nicolas Rousseau, Kevin Rethoré & Sébastien Gréau
2006	Mickaël Delage, Mathieu Ladagnous, Jonathan Mouchel, Sylvain Blanquefort & Mikaël Preau	Maxime Lecoeur, Charly Legris, Ronan Guinaudeau, Sebastien Desplanques & Alexandre Bosquain	Yann Guyot, William Le Corre, Laurent Le Gac, Kevin Piriou & Yann Rault
2007	Alexandre Lemair, Ronan Guinaudeau, Etienne Pieret & Maxime Lecoeur	Andy Flickinger, Vivien Brisse, Guillaume Perrot, François Lamiraud & Pierre-Luc Périchon	Fabien Sanchez, Arnaud Depreeuw, Yann Meulemans & Jean-Marc Maurin
2008	Pays de la Loire; Damien Gaudin, Jérôme Cousin, Fabrice Jeandesboz & Sébastien Turgot	Provence; Jonathan Mouchel, Jonathan Balbuena, Maxime Bouet & Renaud Pioline	Côte d'Azur; Arnaud Depreeuw, Fabien Sanchez, Sébastien Thomas & Thomas Vaubourzex
2009	Pays de la Loire; Damien Gaudin, Jérôme Cousin, Bryan Nauleau & Angélo Tulik	Orléanais; Alexis Jarry, Morgan Lamoisson, Maël Maziou & Alexandre Piat	Rhône-Alpes; Morgan Kneisky, Guillaume Perrot, François Lamiraud & Kevin Fouache
2010	Pays de la Loire; Benoit Daeninck, Damien Gaudin, Julien Moric, Bryan Naulleau & Jeremie Souton	Normandy; Julien Duval, Nicolas Giulia, Kevin Lalouette & Alexandre Lemair	Provence-Alpes-Côte d'Azur; Jean-Edouard Antz, Jonathan Balbuena, Jonathan Brunel, Jonathan Mouchel & Fabien Sanchez

==== Madison ====
Year	Gold	Silver	Bronze
2000	Cofidis; Damien Pommereau & Robert Sassone	New Caledonia; Julien Tejada & Jean-Michel Tessier	Poitou-Charentes; Benoît Genauzeau & Fabien Fernandez
2003	Jérôme Neuville & Nicolas Reynaud	Mathieu Ladagnous & Fabien Patanchon	Robert Sassone & Julien Tejada
2004	Mathieu Ladagnous & Fabien Patanchon	Anthony Langella & Mickaël Delage	Fabien Fernandez & Benoît Genauzeau
2005	Jérôme Neuville & Laurent d'Ollivier	Mathieu Ladagnous & Fabien Patanchon	Benoît Dhaeninck & Yoann Victor
2006	Damien Gaudin & Thibaut Mace	Laurent d'Ollivier & François Lamiraud	Jonathan Mouchel & Sylvain Blanquefort
2007	Ronan Guinaudeau & Alexandre Lemair	Damien Gaudin & Thibaut Mace	Pierre Luc Perrichon & Guillaume Perrot
2008	Damien Gaudin & Sébastien Turgot	Pierre-Luc Périchon & Guillaume Perrot	Nicolas Rousseau & Vincent Dauga
2009	Kevin Fouache & Morgan Kneisky	Jérôme Cousin & Damien Gaudin	Rémi Badoc & Vivien Brisse
2010	Damien Gaudin & Benoît Daeninck	Alexandre Lemair & Florent Gougeard	Julien Duval & Nicolas Giulia

=== Junior ===
Year	Gold	Silver	Bronze
Pursuit
1976	Alain Bondue		
1977	Alain Bondue		
1979	Philippe Chevallier		
2000	William Bonnet	Nicolas Rousseau	Ludovic Fraioli
2003	Jonathan Mouchel	Maxime Bouet	Damien Gaudin
2004	Maxime Bouet	Guillaume Argouach	David Morreau
2005	Vincent Dauga		
2006	Alexandre Lemair		
2007	Jérôme Cousin		
Kilo
2000	Sylvain Alonso	Franck Durivaux	Firmin Touchais
2003	Didier Henriette		
2004	David Alexandre Cabrol	Denis Rivenaire	Damien Roblot
2007	Thierry Jollet	Quentin Lafargue	Charlie Conord
Sprint
2000	Dimitri Paul	Franck Durivaux	Sébastien Notin
2003		Didier Henriette	
2004	David Alexandre Cabrol	Kévin Sireau	Alexandre Volant
2007	Charlie Conord	Quentin Lafargue	Thierry Jollet
Points Race
2000	Olivier Basck	Laurent Duble	Ludovic Fraioli
2003	Jonathan Mouchel	Florent Barle	Alexandre Bosquain
2007	Kevin Fouache	Julien Natviel	Alexis Jarry

==== Team Pursuit ====
Year	Gold	Silver	Bronze
2000	Orléanais; William Bonnet, Olivier Basck, Charly Carlier & Nicolas Rousseau	Flandre-Artois; Grégory Bernard, Nicolas Fontaine, Sébastien Mille & Cédric Ritaine	Dauphine-Savoie; Wilfried Marget, Laurent d'Olivier, Kevin Avarello & Frédéric Dubois
2003	Jonathan Mouchel, Mickaël Delage, Yannick Marie & Mickaël Malle		
2004	Normandy; Maxime Vievard, Maxime Lecoeur, Guillaume Desforges, Ronan Guinaudeau & Raphaël Lesage	Pays de la Loire; Damien Gaudin, Thibaut Mace, Bertrand Mallard & Simon Berson	Brittany; Laurent Pichon, Yannick Simon, Gillaume Argouach, Yann Guyot & Yann Rault
2007	Nicolas Giulia, Julien Duval, Florent Gougeard, Richard Fournier & Jérôme Mallet	Pierre Demay, Jordane Gate, Damien Le Fustec & Simon Gwenaël	Rémi Azema, Remi Badoc, Axel Clot Courant, Christian Spinosa & Ludovic Lepied

==== Madison ====
Year	Gold	Silver	Bronze
2003	Mickaël Delage & Jonathan Mouchel	Mickaël Malle & Yannick Marie	Damien Gaudin & Renou
2004	Guillame Perrot & Pierre-Luc Périchon	Jérémy Besson & Luc Lameloise	Julien Badoc & David Moreau
2007	Pierre Demay & Damien Le Fustec	Rémi Azema & Remi Badoc	Jérôme Cousin & Kévin Francillette

== Women ==
=== Senior ===
Year	Gold	Silver	Bronze
Individual pursuit
1990	Roselyne Riou-Chalon	Corinne Le Gal	Chatherine Talon
1991	Marion Clignet	Jeannie Longo-Ciprelli	Cécile Odin
1992	Jeannie Longo-Ciprelli	Marion Clignet	Nathalie Gendron
1993	Nathalie Gendron	Isabelle Nicoloso	Fabienne Pigeonnier
1994	Jeannie Longo-Ciprelli	Sonia Huguet	Fabienne Pigeonnier
1995	Marion Clignet	Catherine Marsal	Jeannie Longo-Ciprelli
1996	Marion Clignet	Jeannie Longo-Ciprelli	Catherine Marsal
1997	Catherine Marsal	Isabelle N`Guyen van Tu	Cathy Moncassin-Prime
1998	Jeannie Longo-Ciprelli	Cathy Moncassin-Prime	Isabelle N`Guyen van Tu
1999	Jeannie Longo-Ciprelli	Marion Clignet	Laurence Restoin
2000	Marion Clignet	Jeannie Longo-Ciprelli	Isabelle Nicoloso
2001	Juliette Vandekerckhove	Jeannie Longo-Ciprelli	Cathy Moncassin-Prime
2002	Cathy Moncassin-Prime	Jeannie Longo-Ciprelli	Sonia Huguet
2003	Juliette Vandekerckhove	Marion Clignet	Cathy Moncassin-Prime
2004	Cathy Prime Moncassin	Jeannie Longo-Ciprelli	Edwige Pitel
2005	Jeannie Longo-Ciprelli	Marina Jaunâtre	Isabelle N`Guyen van Tu
2006	Cathy Moncassin-Prime	Pascale Jeuland	Jeannie Longo-Ciprelli
2007	Cathy Moncassin Prime	Jeannie Longo-Ciprelli	Pascale Jeuland
2008	Jeannie Longo-Ciprelli	Cathy Moncassin-Prime	Audrey Cordon
2009	Fiona Dutriaux	Jeannie Longo-Ciprelli	Pascale Jeuland
2010	Pascale Jeuland	Aude Bianic	Fiona Dutriaux
500 m time trial
1995	Félicia Ballanger	Magali Humbert-Faure	Nathalie Lancien-Even
1996	Félicia Ballanger	Magali Humbert-Faure	Christelle Ribault
1997	Félicia Ballanger	Magali Humbert-Faure	Nathalie Lancien-Even
1998	Félicia Ballanger	Magali Humbert-Faure	Christelle Ribault
1999	Félicia Ballanger	Magali Humbert-Faure	Christelle Ribault
2000	Félicia Ballanger	Magali Faure	Céline Nivert
2001	Magali Humbert-Faure	Céline Nivert	Mathilde Doutreluingne
2002	Céline Nivert	Clara Sanchez	Mathilde Doutreluingne
2003	Clara Sanchez	Céline Nivert	Mathilde Doutreluingne
2004	Clara Sanchez	Céline Nivert	Félicia Ballanger
2005	Céline Nivert	Clara Sanchez	Emilie Jeannot
2006	Clara Sanchez	Emilie Jeannot	Pascale Jeuland
2007	Sandie Clair	Virginie Cueff	Clara Sanchez
2008	Sandie Clair	Virginie Cueff	Clara Sanchez
2009	Sandie Clair	Clara Sanchez	Virginie Cueff
2010	Sandie Clair	Clara Sanchez	Virginie Cueff
Sprint
2000	Félicia Ballanger	Magali Faure	Céline Nivert
2004	Clara Sanchez	Céline Nivert	Emilie Jeannot
2007	Clara Sanchez	Virginie Cueff	Sandie Clair
2008	Clara Sanchez	Sandie Clair	Virginie Cueff
2009	Clara Sanchez	Virginie Cueff	Sandie Clair
2010	Clara Sanchez	Sandie Clair	Virginie Cueff
Points race
2000	Marion Clignet	Isabelle Nicoloso	Cathy Moncassin
2004	Sonia Huguet	Jeannie Longo-Ciprelli	Cathy Moncassin Prime
2007	Pascale Jeuland	Cathy Moncassin Prime	Sophie Creux
2008	Pascale Jeuland	Emilie Blanquefort	Elodie Henriette
2009	Pascale Jeuland	Sophie Creux	Flavie Montlusclat
2010	Fiona Dutriaux	Aude Bianic	Roxane Fournier
Scratch
2008	Edwige Pitel	Sandie Clair	Virginie Cueff
2009	Pascale Jeuland	Fiona Dutriaux	Sophie Creux
2010	Clara Sanchez	Fiona Dutriaux	Virginie Cueff

=== Junior ===
Year	Gold	Silver	Bronze
Pursuit
1994	Cathy Moncassin-Prime		
2000	Juliette Vandekerkhove	Adeline Le Borgne	Mélissa Seurin
2004	Pascale Jeuland	Emmanuelle Merlot	Angélique Aldana
2005	Pascale Jeuland		
2008	Margot Ortega	Aude Biannic	Roxane Fournier
500m TT
2000	Mathilde Doutreluingue	Clara Sanchez	Juliette Vandekerkhove
2004	Elodie Henriette	Marie Mélianie Verger	Christel Pourais
2007	Magali Baudacci	Typhenn Garel	Fiona Duriaux
2008	Olivia Montauban	Magalie Baudacci	Laurie Berthon
Sprint
2000	Juliette Vandekerkhove	Mathilde Doutreluingue	Clara Sanchez
2004	Elodie Henriette	Marie Aurélie	Christel Pourais
2007	Typhenn Garel	Pauline Avarello	Nolwenn Le Got
2008	Olivia Montauban	Magalie Baudacci	Laurie Berthon
Points Race
2000	Juliette Vandekerkhove	Albertine Bouedo	Mélissa Seurin
2004	Florence Girardet	Emmanuelle Merlot	Cindy Morvan
2007	Élise Delzenne	Fiona Dutriaux	Nolwenn Le Got
2008	Pauline Avarello	Margot Ortega	Nolwenn Le Got
