= 2003 UCI Track Cycling World Championships =

Cycling world championships

- Venue: Stuttgart, Germany
- Date: July 30–August 3, 2003
- Velodrome: Hanns-Martin-Schleyer-Halle
- Events: 15

The 2003 UCI Track Cycling World Championships were the World Championship for track cycling. They took place at the Hanns-Martin-Schleyer-Halle in Stuttgart, Germany from July 30 to August 3, 2003. The championships were due to be held in Shenzhen, China, but were moved to Stuttgart following the 2003 SARS outbreak in China.

One of Germany's best chances of earning a gold medal was the men's team pursuit, having broken the four-minute barrier at the 2000 Olympics. However, Erfurt coach Jens Lang and his cyclist Jens Lehmann disagreed with the national team selection, and threatened with not competing with Berlin riders Robert Bartko and Guido Fulst. As a result, the German federation decided to withdraw from the team pursuit event, and later decided to suspend the Erfurt riders from the national team.

== Medal table ==
| Rank | Nation | Gold | Silver | Bronze | Total |
|---|---|---|---|---|---|
| 1 | Russia (RUS) | 4 | 0 | 2 | 6 |
| 2 | France (FRA) | 2 | 2 | 2 | 6 |
| 3 | Germany (GER) | 2 | 0 | 1 | 3 |
| 4 | Switzerland (SUI) | 2 | 0 | 0 | 2 |
| 5 | Australia (AUS) | 1 | 7 | 0 | 8 |
| 6 | Great Britain (GBR) | 1 | 1 | 1 | 3 |
| 7 | Belarus (BLR) | 1 | 1 | 0 | 2 |
| 8 | Netherlands (NED) | 1 | 0 | 2 | 3 |
| 9 | Austria (AUT) | 1 | 0 | 0 | 1 |
| 10 | Mexico (MEX) | 0 | 1 | 1 | 2 |
| 10 | Spain (ESP) | 0 | 1 | 1 | 2 |
| 12 | Lithuania (LTU) | 0 | 1 | 0 | 1 |
| 12 | New Zealand (NZL) | 0 | 1 | 0 | 1 |
| 14 | Argentina (ARG) | 0 | 0 | 1 | 1 |
| 14 | Barbados (BAR) | 0 | 0 | 1 | 1 |
| 14 | China (CHN) | 0 | 0 | 1 | 1 |
| 14 | Cuba (CUB) | 0 | 0 | 1 | 1 |
| 14 | South Africa (RSA) | 0 | 0 | 1 | 1 |
| Totals (18 entries) | | 15 | 15 | 15 | 45 |

== Medal summary ==
| Event | Gold | | Silver | | Bronze | |
|---|---|---|---|---|---|---|
Men's Events
| Men's sprint | Laurent Gané; France | | Jobie Dajka; Australia | | René Wolff; Germany | |
| Men's 1 km time trial | Stefan Nimke; Germany | 1:01.599 | Shane Kelly; Australia | 1:01.957 | Arnaud Tournant; France | 1:02.055 |
| Men's individual pursuit | Bradley Wiggins; Great Britain | | Luke Roberts; Australia | | Sergi Escobar Roure; Spain | |
| Men's team pursuit | Graeme Brown; Peter Dawson; Brett Lancaster; Luke Roberts; Australia | | Rob Hayles; Paul Manning; Bradley Wiggins; Bryan Steel; Great Britain | | Fabien Merciris; Jérôme Neuville; Franck Perque; Fabien Sanchez; France | |
| Men's team sprint | Carsten Bergemann; Jens Fiedler; René Wolff; Germany | | Mickaël Bourgain; Laurent Gané; Arnaud Tournant; France | | Chris Hoy; Craig MacLean; Jamie Staff; Great Britain | |
| Men's keirin | Laurent Gané; France | | Jobie Dajka; Australia | | Barry Forde; Barbados | |
| Men's scratch | Franco Marvulli; Switzerland | | Robert Sassone; France | | Jean Pierre van Zyl; South Africa | |
| Men's points race | Franz Stocher; Austria | 77 | Joan Llaneras; Spain | 74 | Jos Pronk; Netherlands | 70 |
| Men's madison | Bruno Risi; Franco Marvulli; Switzerland | 13 | Gregory Henderson; Hayden Roulston; New Zealand | 5 | Juan Curuchet; Walter Pérez; Argentina | 5 |
Women's Events
| Women's sprint | Svetlana Grankovskaya; Russia | | Natallia Tsylinskaya; Belarus | | Nancy Contreras; Mexico | |
| Women's 500 m time trial | Natallia Tsylinskaya; Belarus | 34.078 | Nancy Contreras; Mexico | 34.516 | Jiang Cuihua; China | 34.746 |
| Women's individual pursuit | Leontien Zijlaard-van Moorsel; Netherlands | | Katie Mactier; Australia | | Olga Sliusareva; Russia | |
| Women's keirin | Svetlana Grankovskaya; Russia | | Anna Meares; Australia | | Oxana Grishina; Russia | |
| Women's scratch | Olga Sliusareva; Russia | | Rochelle Gilmore; Australia | | Adrie Visser; Netherlands | |
| Women's points race | Olga Sliusareva; Russia | 27 | Edita Kubelskienė; Lithuania | 19 | Yoanka González; Cuba | 16 |
