= 1999 UCI Track Cycling World Championships =

Cycling world championships

- Venue: Berlin, Germany
- Date: October 20–24, 1999
- Velodrome: Berlin Velodrome
- Events: 12

The 1999 UCI Track Cycling World Championships were the World Championship for track cycling. They took place in Berlin, Germany from October 20 to October 24, 1999. Twelve events were contested, eight for the men and four for the women. France dominated most of the events, with Félicia Ballanger and Marion Clignet making a clean sweep of the women's championships by taking two golds each, France won over half of the gold medals on offer.

== Medal table ==
Rank	Nation	Gold	Silver	Bronze	Total
1	France (FRA)	7	1	2	10
2	Germany (GER)	3	4	4	11
3	Spain (ESP)	1	0	0	1
3	Switzerland (SUI)	1	0	0	1
5	Australia (AUS)	0	2	0	2
6	New Zealand (NZL)	0	1	1	2
7	China (CHN)	0	1	0	1
7	Denmark (DEN)	0	1	0	1
7	Great Britain (GBR)	0	1	0	1
7	Ukraine (UKR)	0	1	0	1
11	Canada (CAN)	0	0	1	1
11	Italy (ITA)	0	0	1	1
11	Lithuania (LTU)	0	0	1	1
11	Russia (RUS)	0	0	1	1
11	South Korea (KOR)	0	0	1	1
Totals (15 entries)		12	12	12	36

== Medal summary ==
Event	Gold		Silver		Bronze	
Men's events
Men's sprint	Laurent Gané; France		Jens Fiedler; Germany		Florian Rousseau; France	
Men's 1 km time trial	Arnaud Tournant; France	1:02.231	Shane Kelly; Australia	1:02.436	Stefan Nimke; Germany	1:03.110
Men's individual pursuit	Robert Bartko; Germany		Jens Lehmann; Germany	caught	Mauro Trentini; Italy	4:25.079
Men's team pursuit	Christian Lademann; Daniel Becke; Robert Bartko; Guido Fulst; Germany	4:01.144	Cyril Bos; Philippe Ermenault; Francis Moreau; Jérôme Neuville; France	4:03.965	Vladislav Borisov; Edouard Gritsoun; Alexei Markov; Denis Smyslov; Russia	4:05.251
Men's team sprint	Laurent Gané; Florian Rousseau; Arnaud Tournant; France	44.848	Chris Hoy; Craig MacLean; Jason Queally; Great Britain	45.485	Sören Lausberg; Stefan Nimke; Eyk Pokorny; Germany	45.364
Men's keirin	Jens Fiedler; Germany		Anthony Peden; New Zealand		Laurent Gané; France	
Men's points race	Bruno Risi; Switzerland	25	Vasyl Yakovlev; Ukraine	18	Cho Ho-Sung; South Korea	15
Men's madison	Isaac Gálvez; Joan Llaneras; Spain	3	Jimmi Madsen; Jakob Storm Piil; Denmark	25 (-1 lap)	Andreas Kappes; Olaf Pollack; Germany	22 (-1 lap)
Women's events
Women's sprint	Félicia Ballanger; France		Michelle Ferris; Australia		Tanya Dubnicoff; Canada	
Women's 500 m time trial	Félicia Ballanger; France	34.447	Jiang Cuihua; China	34.869	Ulrike Weichelt; Germany	35.166
Women's individual pursuit	Marion Clignet; France	3:33.012	Judith Arndt; Germany	3:42.040	Rasa Mažeikytė; Lithuania	3:35.678
Women's points race	Marion Clignet; France	20	Judith Arndt; Germany	18	Sarah Ulmer; New Zealand	18
