= UCI Track Cycling World Championships – Men's 1 km time trial =

The UCI Track Cycling World Championships – Men's 1 km Time Trial is the world championship in the track cycling 1 kilometre time trial event for men, held annually at the UCI Track Cycling World Championships. The event is widely known simply as 'the kilo', and until 2024 was ridden only by men.

Jeffrey Hoogland of the Netherlands has the record of most wins with five. Arnaud Tournant achieved four wins in succession, setting the longest winning streak in the event. Shane Kelly of Australia, with thee gold medals, four silver medals and two bronze medals, is the most decorated kilo rider.

The event was also held at the Summer Olympics from 1928. However, after it was removed from the 2008 Summer Olympics cycling programme, some cyclists, such as Hoy, decided to concentrate on other events instead.

The event was first held at the world championships in 1966, until 1993 it was an amateurs race.

== Medalists ==
Championship	Gold	Silver	Bronze
1993 Hamar	Florian Rousseau (FRA)	Shane Kelly (AUS)	Jens Glücklich (GER)
1994 Palermo	Florian Rousseau (FRA)	Erin Hartwell (USA)	Shane Kelly (AUS)
1995 Bogotá	Shane Kelly (AUS)	Florian Rousseau (FRA)	Erin Hartwell (USA)
1996 Manchester	Shane Kelly (AUS)	Sören Lausberg (GER)	Jan van Eijden (GER)
1997 Perth	Shane Kelly (AUS)	Sören Lausberg (GER)	Stefan Nimke (GER)
1998 Bordeaux	Arnaud Tournant (FRA)	Shane Kelly (AUS)	Erin Hartwell (USA)
1999 Berlin	Arnaud Tournant (FRA)	Shane Kelly (AUS)	Stefan Nimke (GER)
2000 Manchester	Arnaud Tournant (FRA)	Sören Lausberg (GER)	Jason Queally (GBR)
2001 Antwerp	Arnaud Tournant (FRA)	Sören Lausberg (GER)	Grzegorz Krejner (POL)
2002 Copenhagen	Chris Hoy (GBR)	Arnaud Tournant (FRA)	Shane Kelly (AUS)
2003 Stuttgart	Stefan Nimke (GER)	Shane Kelly (AUS)	Arnaud Tournant (FRA)
2004 Melbourne	Chris Hoy (GBR)	Arnaud Tournant (FRA)	Theo Bos (NED)
2005 Los Angeles	Theo Bos (NED)	Jason Queally (GBR)	Chris Hoy (GBR)
2006 Bordeaux	Chris Hoy (GBR)	Ben Kersten (AUS)	François Pervis (FRA)
2007 Palma de Mallorca	Chris Hoy (GBR)	François Pervis (FRA)	Jamie Staff (GBR)
2008 Manchester	Teun Mulder (NED)	Michaël D'Almeida (FRA)	François Pervis (FRA)
2009 Pruszków	Stefan Nimke (GER)	Taylor Phinney (USA)	Mohd Rizal Tisin (MAS)
2010 Ballerup	Teun Mulder (NED)	Michaël D'Almeida (FRA)	François Pervis (FRA)
2011 Apeldoorn	Stefan Nimke (GER)	Teun Mulder (NED)	François Pervis (FRA)
2012 Melbourne	Stefan Nimke (GER)	Michaël D'Almeida (FRA)	Simon van Velthooven (NZL)
2013 Minsk	François Pervis (FRA)	Simon van Velthooven (NZL)	Joachim Eilers (GER)
2014 Cali	François Pervis (FRA)	Joachim Eilers (GER)	Simon van Velthooven (NZL)
2015 Yvelines	François Pervis (FRA)	Joachim Eilers (GER)	Matt Archibald (NZL)
2016 London	Joachim Eilers (GER)	Theo Bos (NED)	Quentin Lafargue (FRA)
2017 Hong Kong	François Pervis (FRA)	Tomáš Bábek (CZE); Quentin Lafargue (FRA)	None awarded
2018 Apeldoorn	Jeffrey Hoogland (NED)	Matthew Glaetzer (AUS)	Theo Bos (NED)
2019 Pruszków	Quentin Lafargue (FRA)	Theo Bos (NED)	Michaël D'Almeida (FRA)
2020 Berlin	Sam Ligtlee (NED)	Quentin Lafargue (FRA)	Michaël D'Almeida (FRA)
2021 Roubaix	Jeffrey Hoogland (NED)	Nicholas Paul (TTO)	Joachim Eilers (GER)
2022 Saint-Quentin-en-Yvelines	Jeffrey Hoogland (NED)	Melvin Landerneau (FRA)	Alejandro Martínez (ESP)
2023 Glasgow	Jeffrey Hoogland (NED)	Matthew Glaetzer (AUS)	Thomas Cornish (AUS)
2024 Ballerup	Harrie Lavreysen (NED)	Jeffrey Hoogland (NED)	Joseph Truman (GBR)
2025 Santiago	Harrie Lavreysen (NED)	Jeffrey Hoogland (NED)	Joseph Truman (GBR)
2026 Shanghai	Jeffrey Hoogland (NED)	Étienne Oliviero (FRA)	Joseph Truman (GBR)

== Medal table ==
Rank	Nation	Gold	Silver	Bronze	Total
1	France	11	11	8	30
2	Netherlands	11	5	2	18
3	Germany	5	6	6	17
4	Great Britain	4	1	6	11
5	Australia	3	7	3	13
6	United States	0	2	2	4
7	New Zealand	0	1	3	4
8	Czech Republic	0	1	0	1
9	Malaysia	0	0	1	1
9	Poland	0	0	1	1
9	Spain	0	0	1	1
9	Trinidad and Tobago	0	0	1	1
Totals (12 entries)		34	34	34	102
