= Lancien =

Lancien is a surname. Notable people with the surname include:

- Frédéric Lancien (born 1971), French cyclist
- Jack Lancien (1923–1991), Canadian ice hockey player
- Nathalie Lancien (born 1970), French racing cyclist
- Noël Lancien (1934–1999), French composer, conductor, and music educator
