= Vélo d'Or français =

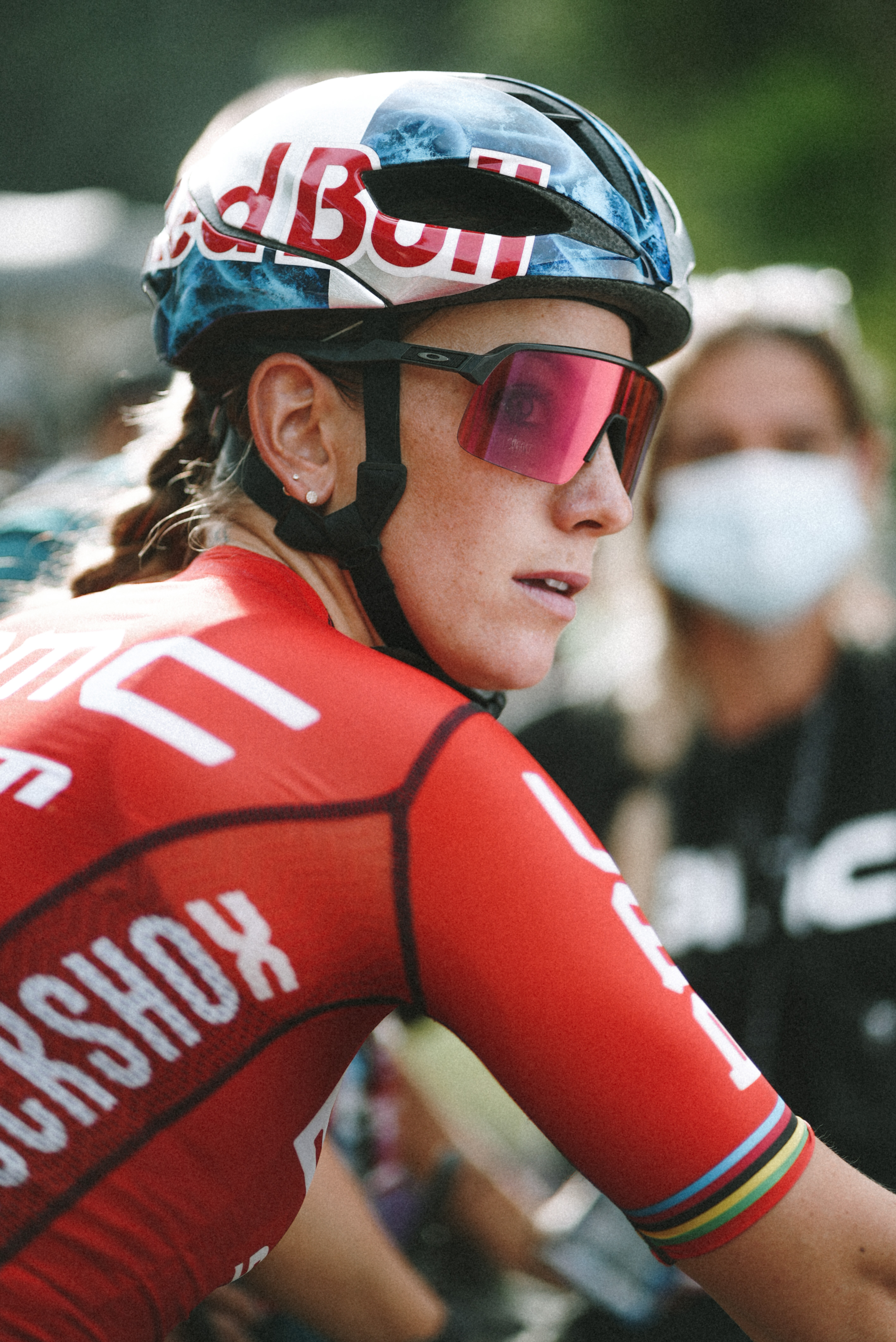
Pauline Ferrand Prevot during the XCC World Cup in Petropolis, 2022

The Vélo d'Or français (French for "French Golden Bicycle") is a cycle racing award, created in 1992 by the French cycling magazine Vélo Magazine. Until 2023, the award was given to the French rider, male or female, considered to have performed the best over the year. Since 2025, this has been subdivided into two awards: the "Trophée Bernard Hinault" for male cyclists and the "Trophée Jeannie Longo" for female cyclists. An additional award for Paralympic cycling was introduced in 2024. These awards are presented at the same ceremony as the "Vélo d'Or", which is given to the best international rider.

Mountain biker Julien Absalon has the most awards, with four.

== Recipients ==
=== Vélo d'Or français (1992 - 2022) ===
Year	Winner	Second	Third
1992	Laurent Jalabert	Luc Leblanc	Thierry Marie
1993	Florian Rousseau	Gilbert Duclos-Lassalle	Philippe Ermenault
1994	Luc Leblanc	Richard Virenque	Florian Rousseau
1995	Laurent Jalabert (2)	Richard Virenque	Jeannie Longo
1996	Florian Rousseau (2)	Jeannie Longo	Félicia Ballanger
1997	Laurent Brochard	Florian Rousseau	Laurent Jalabert
1998	Florian Rousseau (3)	Félicia Ballanger	Arnaud Tournant
1999	Laurent Gané	Félicia Ballanger	Laurent Jalabert
2000	Félicia Ballanger	Florian Rousseau	Miguel Martinez
2001	Arnaud Tournant	Laurent Jalabert	Jeannie Longo
2002	Laurent Jalabert (3)	Patrice Halgand	David Moncoutié
2003	Laurent Gané (2)	Richard Virenque	Jean-Patrick Nazon
2004	Julien Absalon	Thomas Voeckler	Richard Virenque
2005	Julien Absalon (2)	David Moncoutié	Anthony Geslin
2006	Julien Absalon (3)	Frédéric Guesdon	Cyril Dessel
2007	Julien Absalon (4)	Christophe Moreau	Sandy Casar
2008	Sylvain Chavanel	Julien Absalon	Cyril Dessel
2009	Grégory Baugé	Pierrick Fédrigo	Thomas Voeckler
2010	Thomas Voeckler	Sylvain Chavanel	Grégory Baugé
2011	Thomas Voeckler (2)	Pierre Rolland	Grégory Baugé
2012	Thomas Voeckler (3)	Julie Bresset	Thibaut Pinot/Arnaud Démare
2013	Christophe Riblon	Julie Bresset	Warren Barguil
2014	Jean-Christophe Péraud	Pauline Ferrand-Prévot	François Pervis
2015	Thibaut Pinot	Pauline Ferrand-Prévot	Romain Bardet
2016	Romain Bardet	Arnaud Démare	Julian Alaphilippe
2017	Romain Bardet (2)	Warren Barguil	Thibaut Pinot
2018	Thibaut Pinot (2)	Julian Alaphilippe	Romain Bardet
2019	Julian Alaphilippe	Thibaut Pinot	Pauline Ferrand-Prévot
2020	Julian Alaphilippe (2)	Arnaud Démare	Pauline Ferrand-Prévot
2021	Julian Alaphilippe (3)	Loana Lecomte	Benoît Cosnefroy
2022	Pauline Ferrand-Prévot	Christophe Laporte	Mathilde Gros

=== Trophée Bernard Hinault (from 2023) ===
Awarded to the best French male cyclist of the season

Year	Winner	Second	Third
2023	Christophe Laporte	Valentin Madouas	Juliette Labous
2024	Romain Bardet	Valentin Madouas	Cedrine Kerbaol
2025	Kévin Vauquelin		

=== Trophée Jeannie Longo (from 2025) ===
Awarded to the best French female cyclist of the season

Year	Winner	Second	Third
2025	Pauline Ferrand-Prévot		

=== Trophée mixte du para-cycliste français (from 2024) ===
Awarded to the best French para-cyclist of the season

Year	Winner	Second	Third
2024	Alexandre Léauté		
2025	Alexandre Léauté (2)		

== Previous awards ==
=== Trophée Daniel Morelon (2023) ===
Awarded to the best French athlete in the Olympic disciplines such as track, mountain biking or BMX

Year	Winner	Second	Third
2023	Pauline Ferrand-Prévot	Romain Mahieu	Victor Koretzky
2024	Pauline Ferrand-Prévot (2)	Joris Daudet	Benjamin Thomas
