= Vincent Le Quellec =

French cyclist (born 1975)

Personal information
- Full name: Vincent Le Quellec
- Born: 8 February 1975 (age 51) Lannion, France

Cycling career
- Sport: Cycling
- Discipline: Track
- Role: Rider
- Rider type: Sprinter

Professional team
- 1998–1999: Cofidis
Medal record
Representing France
Men's track cycling
World Championships
Gold medal – first place	1997 Perth	Team sprint
Gold medal – first place	1998 Bordeaux	Team sprint

Vincent Le Quellec (born 8 February 1975 in Lannion) is a French former track cyclist who specialised in the sprint disciplines, twice winning the team sprint world championship as part of the France team in 1997 and 1998.

== Major results ==
Date	Placing	Event	Competition	Location	Country
1995	2	Sprint	National championships		France
28 August 1997	1st place, gold medalist(s)	Team sprint (Note: The other riders on the squad were Florian Rousseau and Arnaud Tournant)	World Championships	Perth	Australia
21 June 1998	1	Team sprint (Note: The other riders on the squad were Laurent Gané and Hervé Thuet)	World Cup	Hyères	France
27 August 1998	1st place, gold medalist(s)	Team sprint (Note: The other riders on the squad were Florian Rousseau and Arnaud Tournant)	World Championships	Bordeaux	France
1998	2	Sprint	National championships		France
5 September 1999	2	Sprint	World Cup	Cali	Colombia
6 September 1999	1	Team sprint (Note: The other riders on the squad were Mickaël Bourgain and Arnaud Tournant)	World Cup	Cali	Colombia
2001	1	Keirin	National championships		France
