= 2000 UCI Track Cycling World Championships =

Cycling world championships

- Venue: Manchester, United Kingdom
- Date: October 25–29, 2000
- Velodrome: Manchester Velodrome
- Events: 12

The 2000 UCI Track Cycling World Championships were the World Championship for track cycling. They took place in Manchester, United Kingdom from October 26 to October 30, 2000.

== Medal table ==
Rank	Nation	Gold	Silver	Bronze	Total
1	Germany (GER)	4	5	1	10
2	France (FRA)	4	1	1	6
3	Belarus (BLR)	2	0	0	2
4	Great Britain (GBR)	1	2	2	5
5	Spain (ESP)	1	1	1	3
6	China (CHN)	0	1	1	2
7	Belgium (BEL)	0	1	0	1
7	Canada (CAN)	0	1	0	1
9	Russia (RUS)	0	0	2	2
10	Argentina (ARG)	0	0	1	1
10	Austria (AUT)	0	0	1	1
10	Czech Republic (CZE)	0	0	1	1
Totals (12 entries)		12	12	11	35

== Medal summary ==
Event	Gold		Silver		Bronze	
Men's Events
Men's sprint	Jan van Eijden; Germany		Laurent Gané; France			
Men's 1 km time trial	Arnaud Tournant; France	1:01.619	Sören Lausberg; Germany	1:01.744	Jason Queally; Great Britain	1:02.449
Men's individual pursuit	Jens Lehmann; Germany	4:21.836 (Note: Time from final)	Stefan Steinweg; Germany	4:26.704	Rob Hayles; United Kingdom	4:21.998 (Note: Time from bronze final)
Men's team pursuit	Sebastian Siedler; Daniel Becke; Guido Fulst; Jens Lehmann; Germany		Chris Newton; Paul Manning; Bradley Wiggins; Jon Clay; Great Britain		Cyril Bos; Philippe Gaumont; Jérôme Neuville; Damien Pommereau; France	
Men's team sprint	Laurent Gané; Florian Rousseau; Arnaud Tournant; France		Craig MacLean; Jason Queally; Chris Hoy; Great Britain		José Antonio Villanueva; José Antonio Escuredo; Salvador Meliá; Spain	
Men's keirin	Frédéric Magné; France	10.695	Jens Fiedler; Germany		Pavel Buráň; Czech Republic	
Men's points race	Joan Llaneras; Spain	19	Matthew Gilmore; Belgium	18	Franz Stocher; Austria	17
Men's madison	Stefan Steinweg; Erik Weispfennig; Germany	28	Isaac Gálvez; Joan Llaneras; Spain	15	Juan Curuchet; Edgardo Simón; Argentina	8
Women's Events
Women's sprint	Natalia Markovnichenko; Belarus		Lori-Ann Muenzer; Canada		Katrin Meinke; Germany	
Women's 500 m time trial	Natalia Markovnichenko; Belarus	34.838	Jiang Cuihua; China	35.461	Yan Wang; China	35.478
Women's individual pursuit	Yvonne McGregor; Great Britain	3:35.274	Judith Arndt; Germany	3:36.547	Elena Tchalikh; Russia	3:37.974
Women's points race	Marion Clignet; France	15	Judith Arndt; Germany	27 (−1 lap)	Olga Sliusareva; Russia	23 (−1 lap)
