= Anthony Langella =

French cyclist

Personal information
- Born: 24 April 1974 (age 52) Gennevilliers, France

Cycling career
- Sport: Cycling
- Current team: Retired
- Disciplines: Road, track
- Role: Rider

Professional team
- 1997-2002: GAN

Anthony Langella (born 24 April 1974) is a French former cyclist. He competed in the men's team pursuit at the 2004 Summer Olympics.

== Career achievements ==
=== Major results ===
1995
1st Tour de Gironde
1998
1st stage 4 Tour de l'Avenir
2nd Grand Prix de Fourmies
2000
3rd Duo Normand (with Frédéric Finot)
3rd Tour du Finistère
2004
1st World Cup Team Pursuit (with Fabien Merciris, Jérôme Neuville and Fabien Sanchez)
2005
National Points Race Champion
National Team Pursuit Champion (with Mathieu Ladagnous, Mickaël Malle and Fabien Sanchez)

=== Grand Tour general classification results timeline ===
Grand Tour	1999	2000	2001	2002
Giro d'Italia	—	—	—	—
Tour de France	132	120	—	148
Vuelta a España	—	—	—	—

Legend
—	Did not compete
DNF	Did not finish
