= Francis Moreau =

French cyclist

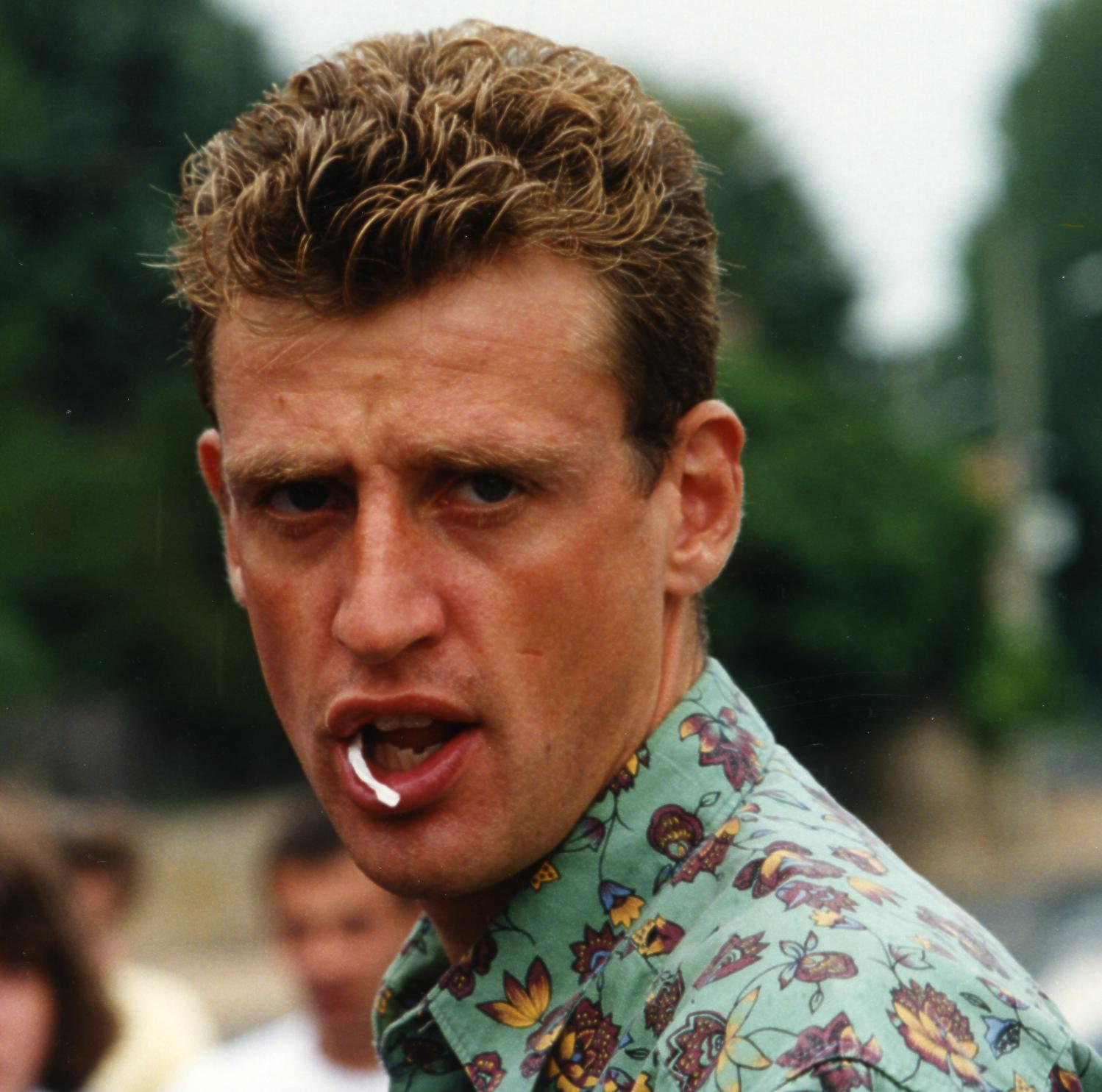

Personal information
- Full name: Francis Moreau
- Born: 21 July 1965 (age 61) Saint-Quentin, France
- Height: 1.87 m (6 ft 2 in)
- Weight: 77 kg (170 lb)

Cycling career
- Sport: Cycling
- Disciplines: Road & Track
- Role: Rider

Amateur team
- Veloclub Saint-Quentin

Professional teams
- 1989: Fagor-MBK
- 1990: Histor - Sigma
- 1991: Tonton Tapis - GB
- 1992: GB - MG Maglificio
- 1993–1996: GAN
- 1997–2000: Cofidis
Medal record
Men's track cycling
Representing France
Olympic Games
Gold medal – first place	1996 Atlanta	Team pursuit
World Championships
Gold medal – first place	1991 Stuttgart	Pursuit
Silver medal – second place	1990 Maebashi	Pursuit
Silver medal – second place	1991 Stuttgart	Points race
Silver medal – second place	1994 Palermo	Pursuit
Silver medal – second place	1996 Manchester	Team pursuit
Silver medal – second place	1998 Bordeaux	Pursuit
Silver medal – second place	1999 Berlin	Team Pursuit
Bronze medal – third place	1996 Manchester	Pursuit

Francis Moreau (born 21 July 1965) is a French former professional racing cyclist from Saint-Quentin. He turned professional in 1989 and retired 12 years later at the end of 2000. A pursuit specialist, Moreau was a frequent medalist and the UCI Track Cycling World Championships, winning the pursuit in 1991. He was also part of the gold medal winning team at the 1996 Summer Olympics, who set a new Olympic record with a time of 4:05:930.

On the road, Moreau finished 132nd at the 1991 Tour de France and 113th in 1994 - despite the death of his father on 9 July; his father had said that he would not want his son to drop out in mourning. In 1995 he finished 5th in the Grand Prix de Plumelec-Morbihan and came 9th in the 1996 Paris–Roubaix.

== Major results ==
1987
1st Stage 1, Circuit de la Sarthe

1988
2nd Segré
3rd Amiens - Beaurains, Amateurs, Beaurains
2nd Prix Frequence Nord, Amateurs

1990
2nd UCI Track Cycling World Championships - Men's Individual Pursuit
2nd Chrono des Herbiers
2nd Duo Normand
3rd Stage 3 Tour Méditerranéen, Marignane
1st Stage 1, Paris–Nice, Paris

1991
1st UCI Track Cycling World Championships - Men's Individual Pursuit
2nd UCI Track Cycling World Championships - Men's Points Race
1st Barentin
3rd Le Havre
3rd Amiens

1992
2nd Arpajon-sur-Cère (FRA)
1st Stage 3, Critérium International, Avignon
2nd Stage 3b, Tour of Luxembourg, Bettembourg
3rd Stage 4, Tour of Luxembourg, Diekirch

1993
3rd Pursuit, French National Track Championships
2nd Postgirot Open

1st Stage 5, Postgirot Open, Burseryd

3rd General Classification Tour du Poitou-Charentes et de la Vienne
3rd Stage 1 Paris–Nice, Fonteney Sous Bois
2nd Amiens
1st Paris - Brussel

1994
2nd UCI Track Cycling World Championships - Men's Individual Pursuit
2nd Pursuit, French National Track Championships
1st Bordeaux - Cauderan
3rd Stage 4a, Circuit Cycliste de la Sarthe
3rd Stage 2, Étoile de Bessèges, Aigues Mortes
1st Amiens
2nd Grand Prix des Nations

1995
1st A Travers le Morbihan
2nd Pursuit, French National Track Championships

1996
1st Team pursuit, 1996 Summer Olympics
2nd UCI Track Cycling World Championships - Men's Team Pursuit
3rd UCI Track Cycling World Championships - Men's Individual Pursuit
5th Points race, 1996 Summer Olympics
9th 1996 Paris–Roubaix
2nd Lèves
2nd La Côte Picarde (FRA)
2nd Stage 3b, Tour of Luxembourg, Bettembourg
3rd Stage 6, Volta Ciclista a Catalunya, Port Aventura

1997
2nd Stage 4b, Tour du Poitou-Charentes et de la Vienne, Poitiers

1998
1st (France) Pursuit, French National Track Championships
2nd UCI Track Cycling World Championships - Men's Individual Pursuit
2nd Calais
3rd Duo Normand
2nd Six-Days of Grenoble

1999
2nd UCI Track Cycling World Championships - Men's Team Pursuit
2nd Team pursuit, French National Track Championships
1st Mexico City, Team Pursuit; (with Cyril Bos, Philippe Ermenault & Damien Pommereau)
1st Mexico City, Pursuit
2nd Frisco, Team Pursuit, Frisco

2000
1st (France) Team pursuit, French National Track Championships
4th Team pursuit, 2000 Summer Olympics
1st GP de Lillers
