= Christelle Ribault =

French cyclist (born 1978)

Personal information
- Born: 23 March 1978 (age 48) Ermont, France

Cycling career
- Sport: Cycling
- Discipline: Track
- Role: Rider
Medal record
Representing France
World Track Championships
Bronze medal – third place	2023 Glasgow	Scratch race C2
Bronze medal – third place	2024 Rio de Janeiro	Scratch race C2
European Para Championships
Silver medal – second place	2023 Rotterdam	Road race C2

Christelle Ribault (born 23 March 1978) is a French cyclist.

== Biography ==
Ribault started cycling at the age of 7 at the Sannois club despite suffering from severe epilepsy, then she moved on to track cycling at the Villeneuve-la-Garenne club under the direction of Gérard Van den Abèle. She ranked third in the French National Track Championships, in the 500 m event when she was still a junior, only beaten by Félicia Ballanger and Magali Humbert-Faure. From 1997 to 1999, she spent two years at the Pôle France in Hyères, trained by three-time Olympic champion Daniel Morelon.

In February 2016, Ribault found herself paralyzed in her left leg caused by misdiagnosed sciatica caused by a herniated disc and despite four months in a rehabilitation center, she did not regain the use of this leg. She subsequently competed in para-cycling in the C21 classification. Although her left leg was paralysed, she did not have an amputation and therefore kept two cranks when she raced.
