= Langella =

Langella is an Italian surname. Notable people with the surname include:

- Anthony Langella (born 1974), French cyclist
- Antonio Langella (born 1977), Italian soccer player
- Frank Langella (born 1938), American actor
- Gennaro Langella (1939–2013), American mobster and underboss
