= Le Quellec =

- Pronunciation: pronounced [lœ kɛlːek]

Origin
- Origin: Breton
- Meaning: ballsy, one who has big testicles.
- Region of origin: Brittany

Other names
- Variant form: Le Quellec

Le Quellec is a surname, and may refer to:

Quellec derives from kellek which means ballsy in Breton. (cf. kell)

- Jean-Loïc Le Quellec, French ethnologist and anthropologist
- Vincent Le Quellec, French track cyclist
- Yann Le Quellec, French director
