= Cathy Moncassin =

French cyclist

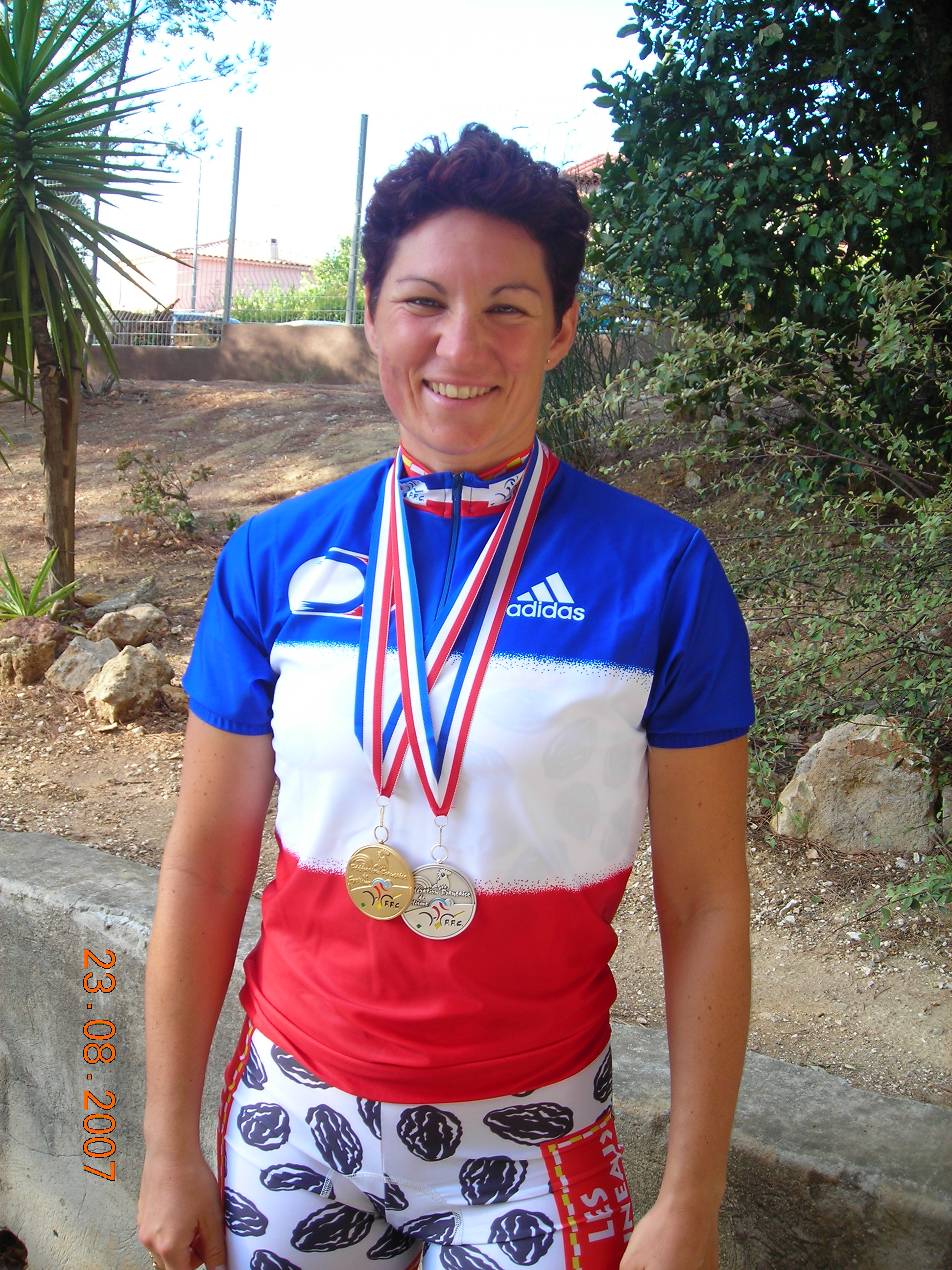

Personal information
- Full name: Cathy Moncassin-Prime
- Born: 3 June 1977 (age 49) Toulouse, France

Cycling career
- Sport: Cycling
- Discipline: Track
- Role: Rider

Professional teams
- 1999: CA Mantes-la-Ville - Jean Floc'h
- 2008: Lot-et-Garonne

Cathy Moncassin-Prime (born 3 June 1977) is a French track racing cyclist from Bonnetage. She is also the niece of Frédéric Moncassin, also a former professional cyclist.

== Palmarès ==
1994
1st Individual Pursuit, French National Track Championships - Junior

2002
1st Individual Pursuit, French National Track Championships

2003
1st Points Race, French National Track Championships
3rd Points Race, Round 3, 2003 UCI Track Cycling World Cup Classics, Cape Town

2004
1st Individual Pursuit, French National Track Championships
1st Stage 3, Tour de Bretagne Féminin

2006
1st Individual Pursuit, French National Track Championships

2007
1st Individual Pursuit, French National Track Championships
