= Philippe Gaumont =

French cyclist (1973–2013)

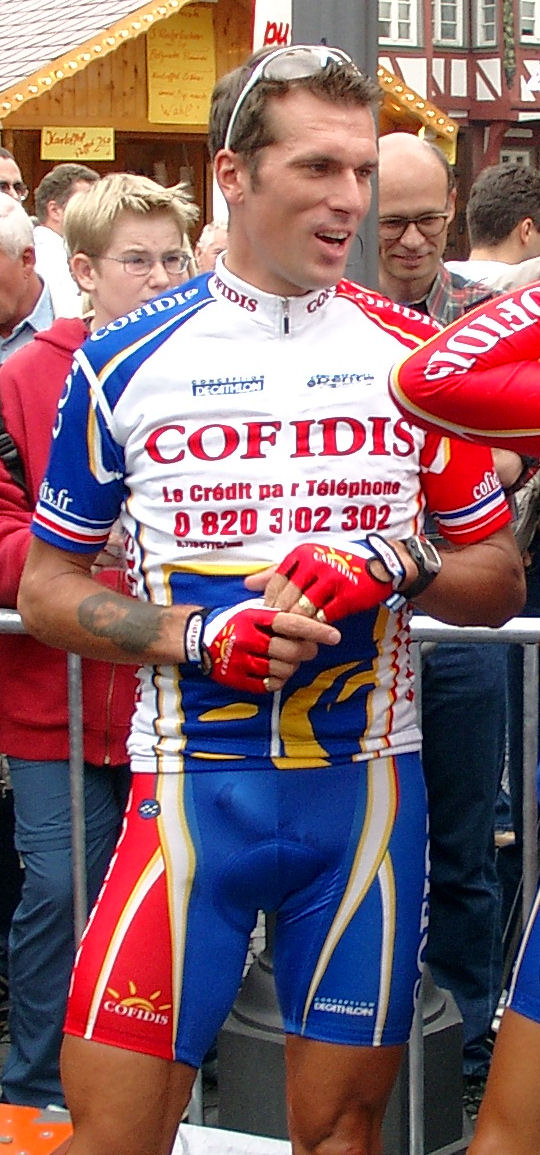

Personal information
- Full name: Philippe Gaumont
- Born: 22 February 1973 Amiens, France
- Died: 17 May 2013 (aged 40) Arras, France
- Height: 1.85 m (6 ft 1 in)
- Weight: 76 kg (168 lb; 12 st 0 lb)

Cycling career
- Sport: Cycling
- Discipline: Road
- Role: Rider

Professional teams
- 1994–1995: Castorama
- 1996: Gan
- 1997–2004: Cofidis
Medal record
Representing France
Men's road bicycle racing
Olympic Games
Bronze medal – third place	1992 Barcelona	Team Time Trial

Philippe Gaumont (22 February 1973 – 17 May 2013) was a French professional road racing cyclist. He earned a bronze medal in the 1992 Summer Olympics, 100 km team time trial. In 1997, he won the Belgian classic Gent–Wevelgem and he was twice individual pursuit French national champion, in 2000 and 2002. In 2004, Gaumont quit professional cycling and later ran a café in Amiens.

Gaumont was well known for having confessed to extensive doping and explaining many tricks of the trade. Gaumont gave a series of interviews, and wrote a book, Prisonnier du dopage ("Prisoner of doping") in which he explained doping methods, masking methods, the use of drug cocktails such as the pot belge for training and for recreation, and how the need to make money makes racers dope themselves. In April 2013, he suffered a major heart attack and was reported to be in a coma. On 13 May 2013, several news sources reported his death, but according to La Voix du Nord he remained in an artificial coma, though had suffered brain death. He died on 17 May 2013.

== Doping usage ==
Gaumont began his professional career in 1994 in the Castorama team. In 1996, he joined the GAN team, and tested positive for nandrolone in two races. He joined Cofidis in 1997 and stayed there until the end of his career. In 1998, he tested positive twice for the nandrolone drug, but the case was later dismissed. A year later a blood test conducted in the "Docteur Mabuse" justice case showed he was positive for amphetamines.

In 2004, he was interrogated by French police and justice in the enquiry for the Cofidis doping case. He declared that he had repeatedly and consistently used doping products, including EPO, since the beginning of his professional career. He then said that he thought that 95% of professional racers doped themselves and expressed very strong doubts that a racer could win a major tour, such as the Tour de France, without doping. As a result of this case, he quit professional racing.

Gaumont gave details in his book such as how to avoid being tested positive for corticoids: how, for instance, to irritate one's testicle sac using salt in order to provoke a rash and obtain a prescription for some corticoid cream. Since urine tests do not distinguish between (legal) corticoid applied as creams, with a prescription, and (illegal) injections, such prescriptions are used to mask doping.

== Major results ==
1992
1st Overall Tour de la Somme
Bronze medal Olympics Men's team time trial
1994
1st Overall Tour du Poitou-Charentes

1st Stage 5

1996
1st Overall Four Days of Dunkirk
1st Overall Tour de Picardie

1st Stage 1

1st La Côte Picarde
2nd Tour de Vendée
1997
1st Gent–Wevelgem
1st Stage 3a Four Days of Dunkirk
1998
1st Stage 1 Grand Prix du Midi Libre
3rd Overall Étoile de Bessèges
2000
French Pursuit Champion
French Team Pursuit Champion
Bronze medal World Championships - Pursuit
2002
French Pursuit Champion

== See also ==
- List of doping cases in cycling
- List of sportspeople sanctioned for doping offences
