= 2006 UCI Track Cycling World Championships – Men's scratch =

The Men's Scratch was one of the 9 men's events at the 2006 UCI Track Cycling World Championships, held in Bordeaux, France.

24 cyclists from 24 countries participated in the contest. Because of the number of entries, there were no qualification rounds for this discipline. Consequently, the event was run direct to the final.

== Final ==
The Final and only race was run at 15:45 on April 15. The competition consisted of 60 laps, making a total of 15 km.

Rank	Name	Country
	Jérôme Neuville	France
	Angel Colla	Argentina
	Ioannis Tamourdis	Greece
4	Wim Stroetinga	Netherlands
5	Danilo Napolitano	Italy
6	Rafał Ratajczyk	Poland
7	Vasil Kiryienka	Belarus
8	Andreas Müller	Germany
9	Unai Elorriaga Zubiaur	Spain
10	Miles Olman	Australia
11	Ivan Kovalev	Russia
12	Hayden Godfrey	New Zealand
13	Alex Rasmussen	Denmark
14	Mario Lexmũller	Austria
15	Carlos Manuel Hernandez	Mexico
16	Matthew Gilmore	Belgium
17	Taiji Nishitani	Japan
18	Jorge Soto	Uruguay
19	Oleksandr Polivoda	Ukraine
DNF	Jiří Hochmann	Czech Republic
DNF	Mark Cavendish	Great Britain
DNF	Bobby Lea	United States
DNF	Martin Gilbert	Canada
DNF	Franco Marvulli	Switzerland
