= Sonia Huguet =

French cyclist (born 1975)

Personal information
- Full name: Sonia Huguet
- Born: 13 September 1975 (age 51) Saint-Avold, France
- Height: 5 ft 10 in (1.78 m)
- Weight: 132 lb (60 kg)

Cycling career
- Sport: Cycling
- Disciplines: Track & Road
- Role: Rider

Professional teams
- 1999: ASPTT Champion - Moselle
- 2004: Baliston - Colnago - Moselle

Sonia Huguet (born 13 September 1975 in Saint-Avold) is a French racing cyclist who represented France at the 2004 Summer Olympics. She was a professional rider between 1994 and 2005.

== Palmarès ==
1993
1st Stage 3, Ronde van de Tarn-et-Garonne

1994
2nd Pursuit, French National Track Championships

1996
1st Points race, French National Track Championships
1st French National Time Trial Championships

2001
2nd French National Road Race Championships
6th French National Time Trial Championships

2002
2nd Pursuit, French National Track Championships
7th French National Time Trial Championships

2003
1st French National Road Race Championships
3rd French National Time Trial Championships

2004
1st La Flèche Wallonne Féminine
3rd French National Time Trial Championships
4th French National Road Race Championships

2005
6th French National Road Race Championships
7th French National Time Trial Championships
