= Mathilde Doutreluingne =

French cyclist

Personal information
- Born: 4 April 1982 (age 44) France

Cycling career
- Sport: Cycling
- Role: Rider (track)

Mathilde Doutreluingne is a French track racing cyclist.

As a junior, she won two bronze medals at the Junior Track Cycling World Championships in the Sprint and the 500 m time trial in 2000. In 2002, she won the European Championships (under-23) in the scratch. In all sprint and 500 m time trial races at the French National Track Championships in 2001, 2002 and 2003 races she finished third.
