= Fabien Patanchon =

French cyclist (born 1983)

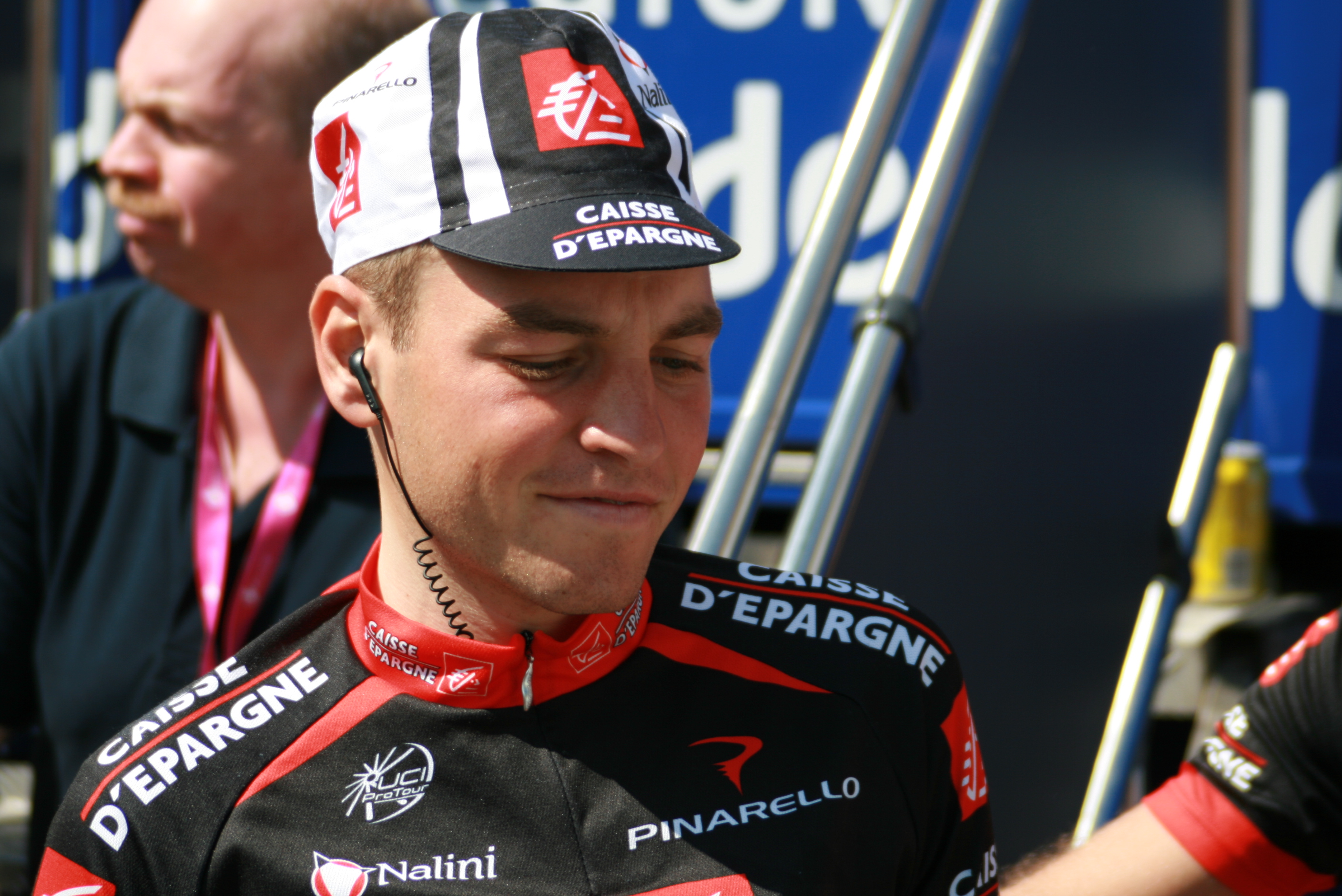

Personal information
- Full name: Fabien Patanchon
- Born: 14 June 1983 (age 43) Bordeaux, France
- Height: 1.79 m (5 ft 10 in)
- Weight: 69 kg (152 lb)

Cycling career
- Sport: Cycling
- Current team: none
- Discipline: Road
- Role: Rider

Professional teams
- 2006–2007: Française des Jeux
- 2008: Caisse d'Epargne

Fabien Patanchon (born 14 June 1983 in Bordeaux) is a retired French professional road bicycle racer.

== Palmarès ==
- Paris–Tours U23 (2005)
- France Track Championships
  - 1st, Madison (2004-with Mathieu Ladagnous)
  - 2nd, Madison (2003–2005), Team Pursuit (2005)
- France U23 Team Pursuit Champion (2005)
- European U23 Madison Champion (2003-with Mathieu Ladagnous)
