= Ulrike Weichelt =

German cyclist

Personal information
- Born: 25 February 1977 (age 49)

Cycling career
- Sport: Cycling

Ulrike Weichelt (born 25 February 1977) is a German former cyclist. She competed in the women's 500 metres time trial at the 2000 Summer Olympics.
