= Fabien Sanchez =

French cyclist

Personal information
- Full name: Fabien Sanchez
- Born: 30 March 1983 (age 43) Hyères, France
- Height: 1.80 m (5 ft 11 in)
- Weight: 77 kg (170 lb)

Cycling career
- Sport: Cycling
- Current team: Retired
- Discipline: Track
- Role: Rider
- Rider type: Pursuit

Amateur teams
- 2007–2009: Veloclub La Pomme Marseille
- 2010: Amical Vélo Club Aix-en-Provence

Professional teams
- 2003–2004: FDJeux.com
- 2005: Française des Jeux
- 2006: Cofidis

Major wins
- French Track Cycling Championships (Pursuit) (2004, 2007); French Track Cycling Championships (Team pursuit) (2005); French Track Cycling Championships (Points race) (2008)
Medal record
Men's track cycling
Representing France
World Championships
Bronze medal – third place	2003 Stuttgart	Team pursuit

Fabien Sanchez (born 30 March 1983 in Hyères) is a French retired professional track cyclist. He won the bronze medal in men's team pursuit at the 2003 UCI Track Cycling World Championships, and later represented his nation France in two editions of the Olympic Games (2004 and 2008). Before his official retirement in late 2008, Sanchez rode for three seasons on the FDJeux.com pro cycling team, following by his annual stint on Cofidis in 2006. Sanchez is also a four-time French track cycling champion in both the individual and team pursuit and in the points race.

== Racing career ==
Before his professional cycling career, Sanchez sought headlines in the international scene, when he led the French team for the gold in a team pursuit final match against the Germans at the 2001 UCI Junior Track Cycling World Championships in Trexlertown, Pennsylvania, United States.

In August 2003, Sanchez turned his sights to professional cycling when he signed a triple seasonal contract with FDJeux.com. On that same year, he delivered the French foursome a bronze-medal time of 4:04.119 to defeat the Russians in men's team pursuit at the UCI Track Cycling World Championships in Stuttgart, Germany, earning them a guaranteed spot for the Olympics.

An official member of the French cycling team, Sanchez made his debut at the 2004 Summer Olympics in Athens, where he finished sixth in the men's individual pursuit (4:21.235), and seventh in the men's team pursuit (4:07.336), along with Anthony Langella, Mathieu Ladagnous, and Jérôme Neuville.

Shortly after the 2004 Summer Olympics, Sanchez extended his career resume by scoring two triumphs each in men's individual and team pursuit at the French Championships, while competing for Française des Jeux and Cofidis pro cycling teams. At the end of 2006 season, Sanchez decided to return to his amateur sporting career, and later joined the La Pomme Marseille Cycling Club (French: Vélo-Club La Pomme Marseille).

The following year, Sanchez qualified for his second French squad, as a 25-year-old, in the men's individual pursuit at the 2008 Summer Olympics in Beijing based on the nation's selection process from the UCI Track World Rankings. Sanchez could not produce a more striking effort in the prelims after losing out his 4 km opening match to Australia's Brett Lancaster by a seven-second gap in 4:33.100, dropping him to fifteenth place in the overall standings.

Setting up his official retirement from competitive cycling in 2010, Sanchez currently works on a full-time position as an athletic director for La Pomme Marseille Cycling Club (French: Vélo-Club La Pomme Marseille).

== Career highlights ==
2001
(gold) UCI Junior World Championships (Team pursuit), Trexlertown, Pennsylvania (USA)
2003
(bronze) UCI Track Cycling World Championships (Team pursuit), Stuttgart (GER)
3rd French Championships (Individual pursuit), Hyères (FRA)
2004
1st French Championships (Individual pursuit), Hyères
6th Olympic Games (Individual pursuit), Athens (GRE)
7th Olympic Games (Team pursuit), Athens (GRE)
2005
1st French Championships (Team pursuit), France
2nd French Championships (Individual pursuit), France
2007
1st French Championships (Individual pursuit), Hyères (FRA)
2nd French Championships (Points race), Hyères (FRA)
3rd French Championships (Team pursuit), Hyères (FRA)
2008
1st French Championships (Points race), France
2nd French Championships (Individual pursuit), France
15th Olympic Games (Individual pursuit), Beijing (CHN)
