= Laurent Gané =

French cyclist

Personal information
- Full name: Laurent Gané
- Born: 7 March 1973 (age 53) Nouméa, France
- Height: 1.76 m (5 ft 9 in)
- Weight: 76 kg (168 lb; 12.0 st)

Cycling career
- Sport: Cycling
- Discipline: Track
- Role: Rider
- Rider type: Sprinter

Professional team
- 1998–2005: Cofidis
Medal record
Representing France
Men's track cycling
Olympic Games
Gold medal – first place	2000 Sydney	Team sprint
Bronze medal – third place	2004 Athens	Team sprint
World Championship
Gold medal – first place	1999 Berlin	Sprint
Gold medal – first place	1999 Berlin	Team sprint
Gold medal – first place	2000 Manchester	Team sprint
Gold medal – first place	2001 Antwerp	Team sprint
Gold medal – first place	2003 Stuttgart	Sprint
Gold medal – first place	2003 Stuttgart	Keirin
Gold medal – first place	2004 Melbourne	Team sprint
Silver medal – second place	2000 Manchester	Sprint
Silver medal – second place	2001 Antwerp	Sprint
Silver medal – second place	2001 Antwerp	Keirin
Silver medal – second place	2003 Stuttgart	Team sprint
Silver medal – second place	2004 Melbourne	Sprint
Bronze medal – third place	1996 Manchester	Team sprint
Bronze medal – third place	1998 Bordeaux	Sprint
Bronze medal – third place	1998 Bordeaux	Keirin

Laurent Gané (born 7 March 1973) is a former French professional track cyclist.

He was awarded the Vélo d'Or français, which is awarded by a panel of French journalists, in 1999 and 2003.

Gané is also the cousin of cyclist Hervé Gané.

== Major results ==
1996
3rd Team Sprint, Track World Championships (with Florian Rousseau & Hervé Robert Thuet)

1999
1st Team Sprint, Track World Championships (with Florian Rousseau & Arnaud Tournant)

2000
1st Team Sprint, Track World Championships (with Florian Rousseau & Arnaud Tournant)
1st Team Sprint, Olympic Games (with Florian Rousseau & Arnaud Tournant)
4th Sprint, Olympic Games

2001
1st Team Sprint, Track World Championships (with Florian Rousseau & Arnaud Tournant)

2003
2nd Team Sprint, Track World Championships (with Mickaël Bourgain & Arnaud Tournant)

2004
1st Team Sprint, Track World Championships (with Mickaël Bourgain & Arnaud Tournant)
3rd Team Sprint, Olympic Games (with Mickaël Bourgain & Arnaud Tournant)
4th Sprint, Olympic Games
