= Mickaël Bourgain =

French cyclist (born 1980)

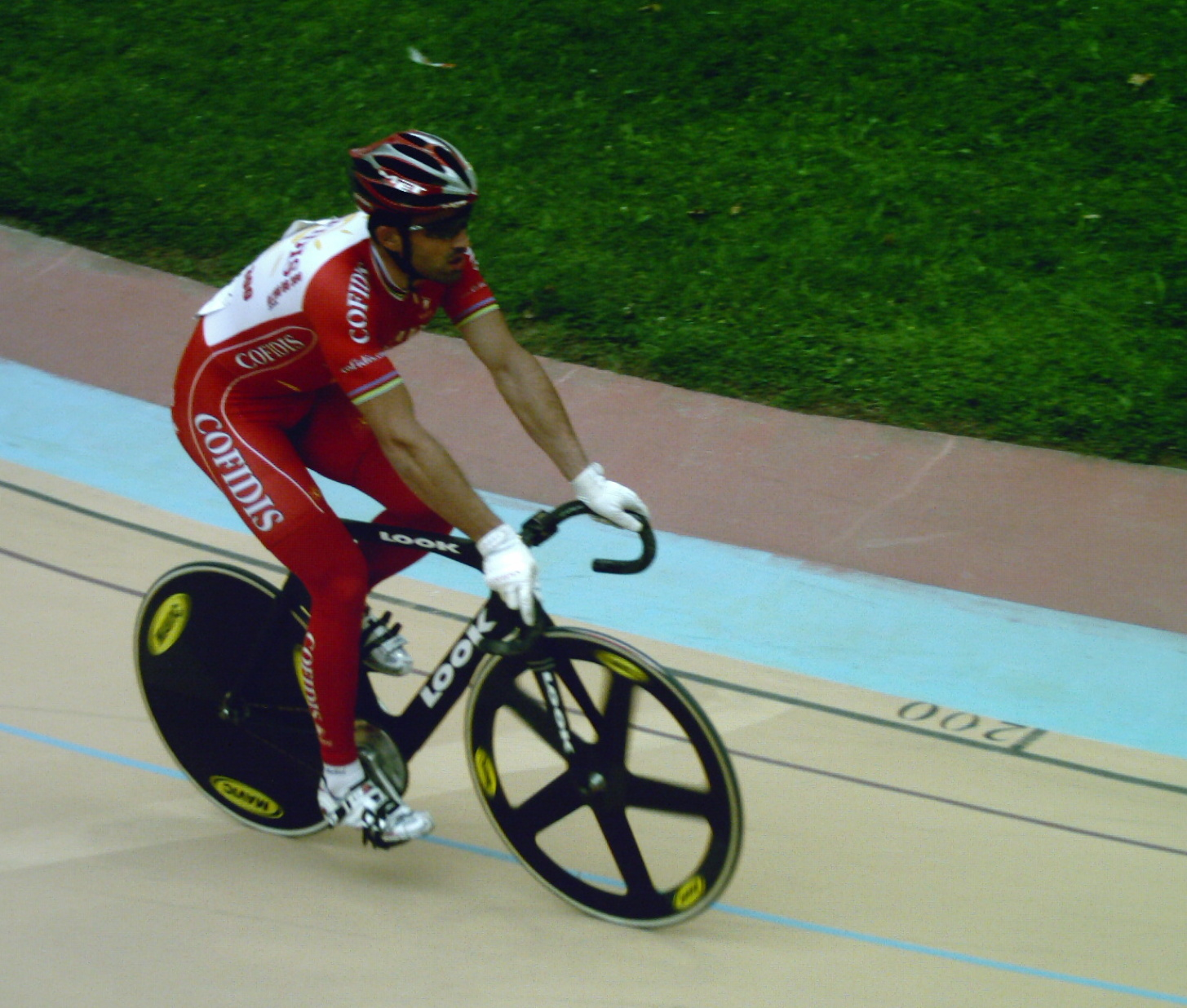

Personal information
- Full name: Mickaël Bourgain
- Born: 28 May 1980 (age 46) Boulogne-sur-Mer, France

Cycling career
- Sport: Cycling
- Discipline: Track
- Role: Rider
- Rider type: Sprinter

Professional team
- 1999-2009: Cofidis

Major wins
- Team sprint world champion (2004, 2006, 2007 and 2009)
Medal record
Representing France
Men's track cycling
Olympic Games
Bronze medal – third place	2004 Athens	Team Sprint
Bronze medal – third place	2008 Beijing	Sprint
World Championships
Gold medal – first place	2004 Melbourne	Team Sprint
Gold medal – first place	2006 Bordeaux	Team Sprint
Gold medal – first place	2007 Palma de Mallorca	Team Sprint
Gold medal – first place	2009 Pruszków	Team Sprint
Silver medal – second place	2003 Stuttgart	Team Sprint
Silver medal – second place	2005 Los Angeles	Sprint
Bronze medal – third place	2007 Palma de Mallorca	Sprint
Bronze medal – third place	2008 Manchester	Sprint
Bronze medal – third place	2011 Apeldoorn	Sprint
European Championships
Silver medal – second place	2011 Apeldoorn	Team sprint

Mickaël Bourgain (born 28 May 1980 in Boulogne-sur-Mer) is a French track cyclist, who won a bronze medal in the men's team sprint race at the 2004 Summer Olympics in Athens together with Laurent Gané and Arnaud Tournant, and a bronze medal in the men's individual sprint at the 2008 Summer Olympics.

== Major results ==
2002
2nd Team Sprint, World Cup, Sydney
3rd Sprint, World Cup, Sydney

2003
2nd Keirin, French National Track Championships
2nd Sprint, French National Track Championships
2nd Team Sprint, UCI Track World Championships
1st Sprint, World Cup, Cape Town
1st Kilo, French National Track Championships, Hyères

2004
1st Team Sprint, UCI Track World Championships
1st Keirin, World Cup, Aguascalientes
1st Team sprint, World Cup, Aguascalientes
1st Sprint, World Cup, Aguascalientes
1st Keirin, French National Track Championships, Hyères
3rd Sprint, French National Track Championships, Hyères
3rd Team Sprint, Olympic Games, Athens

2005
3rd Team sprint, World Cup, Los Angeles
1st Sprint, World Cup, Los Angeles
2nd Keirin, World Cup, Manchester
1st Sprint, World Cup, Manchester
2nd Sprint, UCI Track World Championships, Los Angeles
2nd Sprint, French National Track Championships, Hyères
1st Keirin, French National Track Championships, Hyères
3rd Sprint, World Cup, Manchester

2006
2nd Sprint, World Cup, Los Angeles
1st Team Sprint, World Cup, Los Angeles
1st Team Sprint, UCI Track World Championships, Bordeaux
3rd Keirin, French National Track Championships, Hyères
3rd Keirin, World Cup, Moscow
3rd Team Sprint, World Cup, Moscow

2007
3rd Sprint, World Cup, Manchester
1st Team Sprint, UCI Track World Championships, Palma de Mallorca
3rd Sprint, UCI Track World Championships, Palma de Mallorca
3rd Sprint, French National Track Championships
1st Sprint, World Cup, Sydney
2nd Sprint, World Cup, Beijing

2008
2nd Team sprint, World Cup, Los Angeles
