= Fabien Merciris =

French cyclist (born 1977)

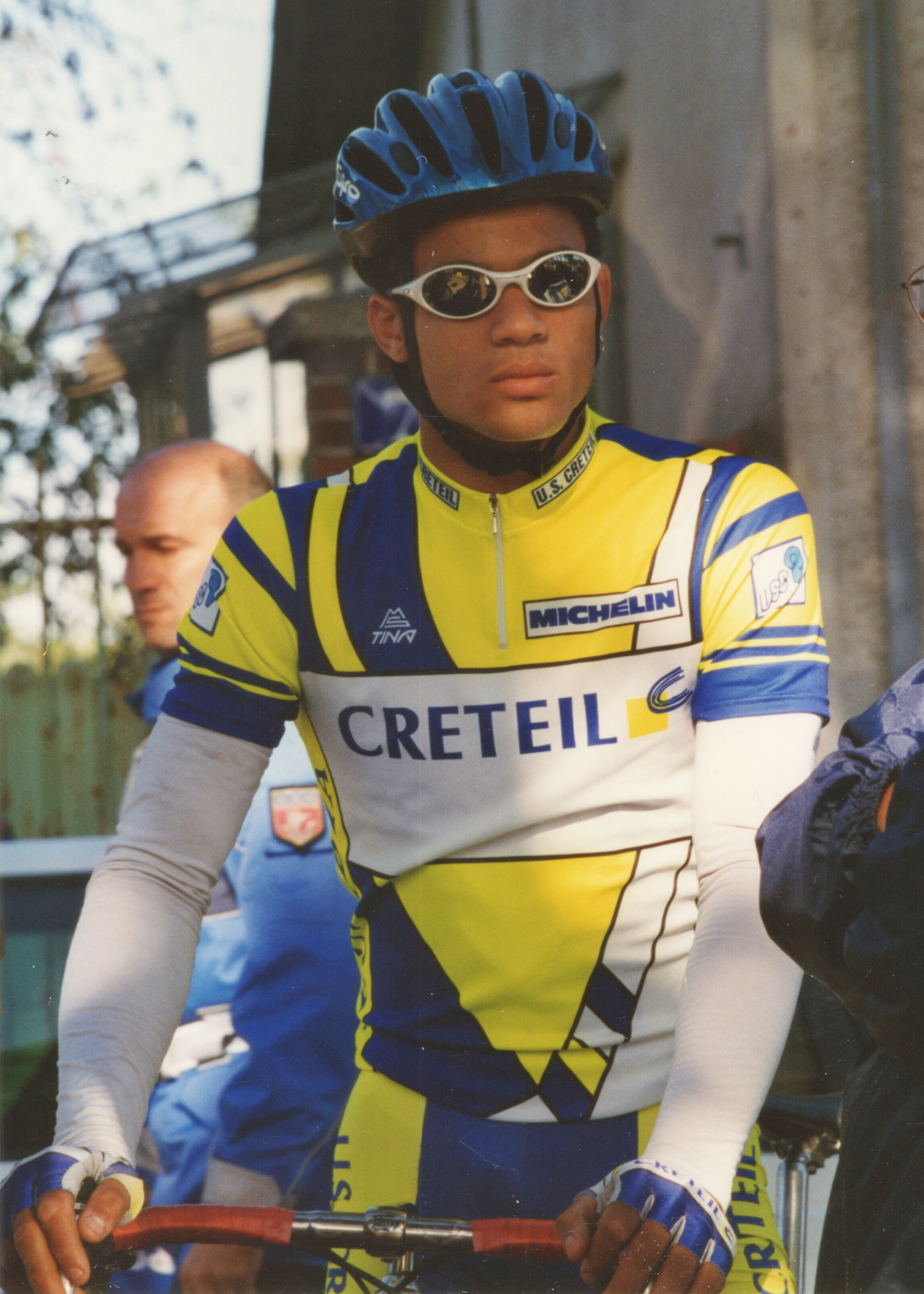
- Merciris in 1996

Personal information
- Born: 15 May 1977 (age 49) Chartres, France

Cycling career
- Sport: Cycling
- Current team: Retired
- Disciplines: Track; Road
- Role: Rider

Amateur teams
- 1999: CC Nogent-sur-Oise
- 2000–2004: USSA Pavilly Barentin
Medal record
Men's track cycling
Representing France
World Championships
Bronze medal – third place	2003 Stuttgart	Team pursuit

Fabien Merciris (born 15 May 1977) is a French former cyclist, who specialized in track races. He won a bronze medal in the team pursuit at the 2003 UCI Track Cycling World Championships.

== Major results ==
1998
1st Team pursuit – Cali, UCI World Cup
2000
2nd Team pursuit, National Championships
2001
2nd Team pursuit, National Championships
2002
8th Tour de la Somme
2003
3rd Team pursuit, UCI World Championships
2004
1st Team pursuit – Aguascalientes, UCI World Cup
