= Cyril Bos =

French cyclist (born 1972)

Personal information
- Born: 26 September 1972 (age 54) Mont-Saint-Aignan, France

Cycling career
- Sport: Cycling
- Current team: Retired
- Disciplines: Track, Road
- Role: Rider

Professional team
- 1997-1998: Gan
Medal record
Representing France
Men's track cycling
World Championships
Silver medal – second place	1996 Manchester	Team pursuit
Silver medal – second place	1999 Berlin	Team pursuit
Bronze medal – third place	2000 Manchester	Team pursuit

Cyril Bos (born 26 September 1972) is a former French cyclist. He competed in the men's team pursuit at the 2000 Summer Olympics.

== Palmares ==
=== Track ===
1995
1st World Cup Madison (with Serge Barbara)
1999
1st World Cup Team Pursuit (with Philippe Ermenault, Pommereau Damien and Francis Moreau)

=== Road ===
1997
1st Duo Normand (with Henk Vogels)
