= Nathalie Lancien =

French cyclist

Personal information
- Full name: Nathalie Lancien
- Born: 7 March 1970 (age 56) Paimpol, France

Cycling career
- Sport: Cycling
- Discipline: Track
- Role: Rider
Medal record
Women's track cycling
Representing France
Olympic Games
Gold medal – first place	1996 Atlanta	Points race
UCI Track World Championships
Bronze medal – third place	1995 Bogota	Points race

Nathalie Lancien (born 7 March 1970) is a French racing cyclist and olympic champion in track cycling.

She was born in Paimpol, and is married to cyclist Frédéric Lancien.

She won a gold medal in the points race at the 1996 Summer Olympics in Atlanta. Nathalie Lancien is married to Frédéric Lancien, a tandem cyclist. In Lannion, the sports center bears his name.
