= Shane Kelly (cyclist) =

Australian cyclist (born 1972)

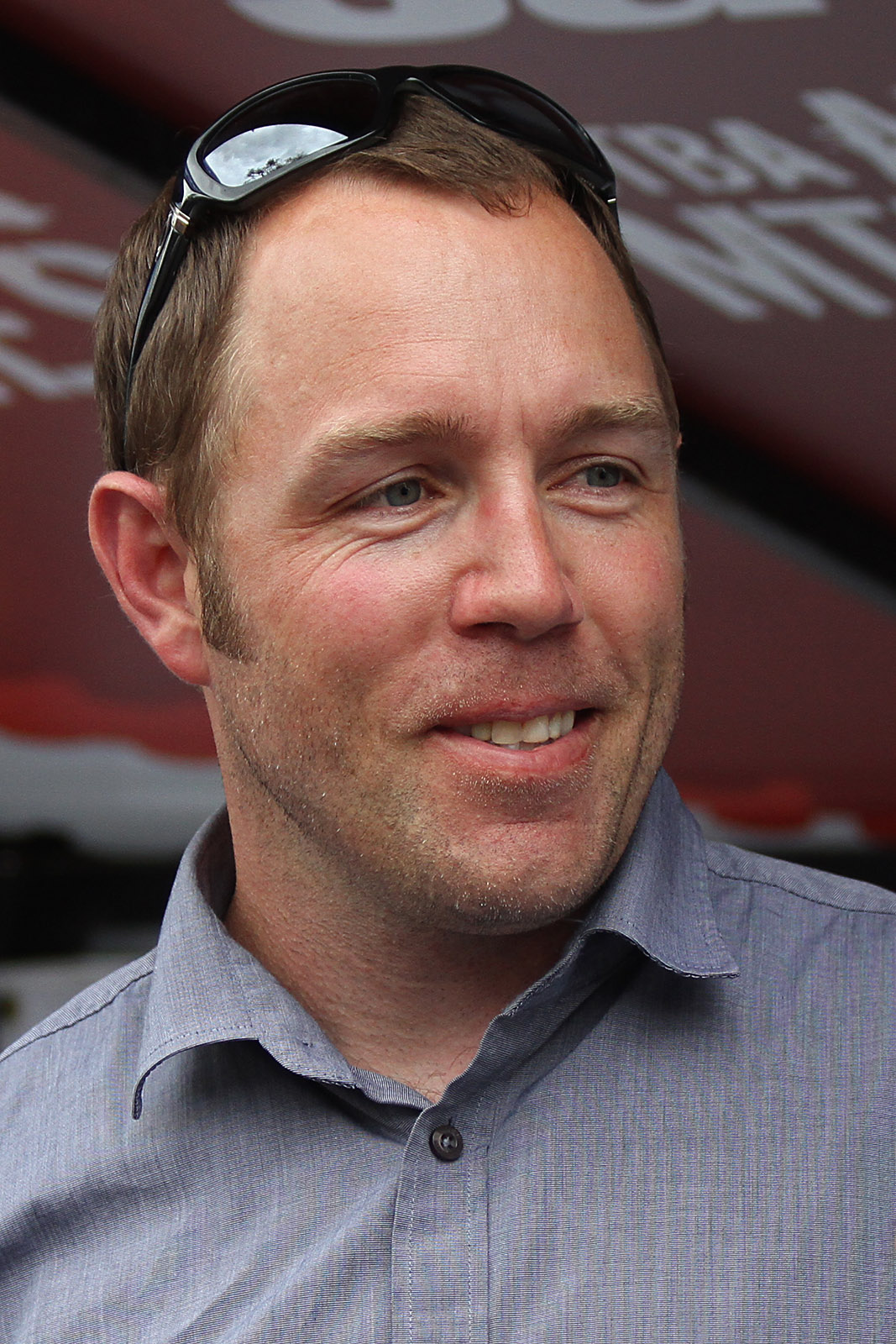
- Kelly in 2010

Personal information
- Full name: Shane John Kelly
- Born: 7 January 1972 (age 54) Ararat, Victoria, Australia
- Height: 1.82 m (6 ft 0 in)
- Weight: 85 kg (187 lb)

Cycling career
- Sport: Cycling
- Discipline: Track
- Role: Sprinter

Amateur team
- -: Stawell-Great Western Cycling Club

Professional team
- -: Toshiba-Australia
Medal record
Representing Australia
Men's track cycling
Olympic Games
Silver medal – second place	1992 Barcelona	1000 m time trial
Bronze medal – third place	2000 Sydney	1000 m time trial
Bronze medal – third place	2004 Athens	Keirin
World Championships
Gold medal – first place	1995 Bogotá	Kilo
Gold medal – first place	1996 Manchester	Kilo
Gold medal – first place	1996 Manchester	Team sprint
Gold medal – first place	1997 Perth	Kilo
Silver medal – second place	1993 Hamar	Kilo
Silver medal – second place	1998 Bordeaux	Kilo
Silver medal – second place	1998 Bordeaux	Team sprint
Silver medal – second place	1999 Berlin	Kilo
Silver medal – second place	2003 Stuttgart	Kilo
Bronze medal – third place	1994 Palermo	Kilo
Bronze medal – third place	1997 Perth	Team Sprint
Bronze medal – third place	2002 Ballerup	Kilo
Bronze medal – third place	2005 Los Angeles	Keirin
Bronze medal – third place	2006 Bordeaux	Team sprint
Commonwealth Games
Gold medal – first place	1994 Victoria BC	1000 m time trial
Gold medal – first place	1998 Kuala Lumpur	1000 m time trial
Bronze medal – third place	2006 Melbourne	Team sprint

Shane John Kelly OAM (born 7 January 1972) is a former professional Australian track racing cyclist. Kelly specialised in the men's 1000 m time trial, commonly known as the Kilo. Kelly announced his retirement from international competition at the end of the 2008 Beijing Summer Olympics. Kelly is now a cycling coach at the Victorian Institute of Sport, having coached Paralympic Gold in record time and multiple world champiuonship gold, silver, and bronze medals + world records!

== Cycling career ==
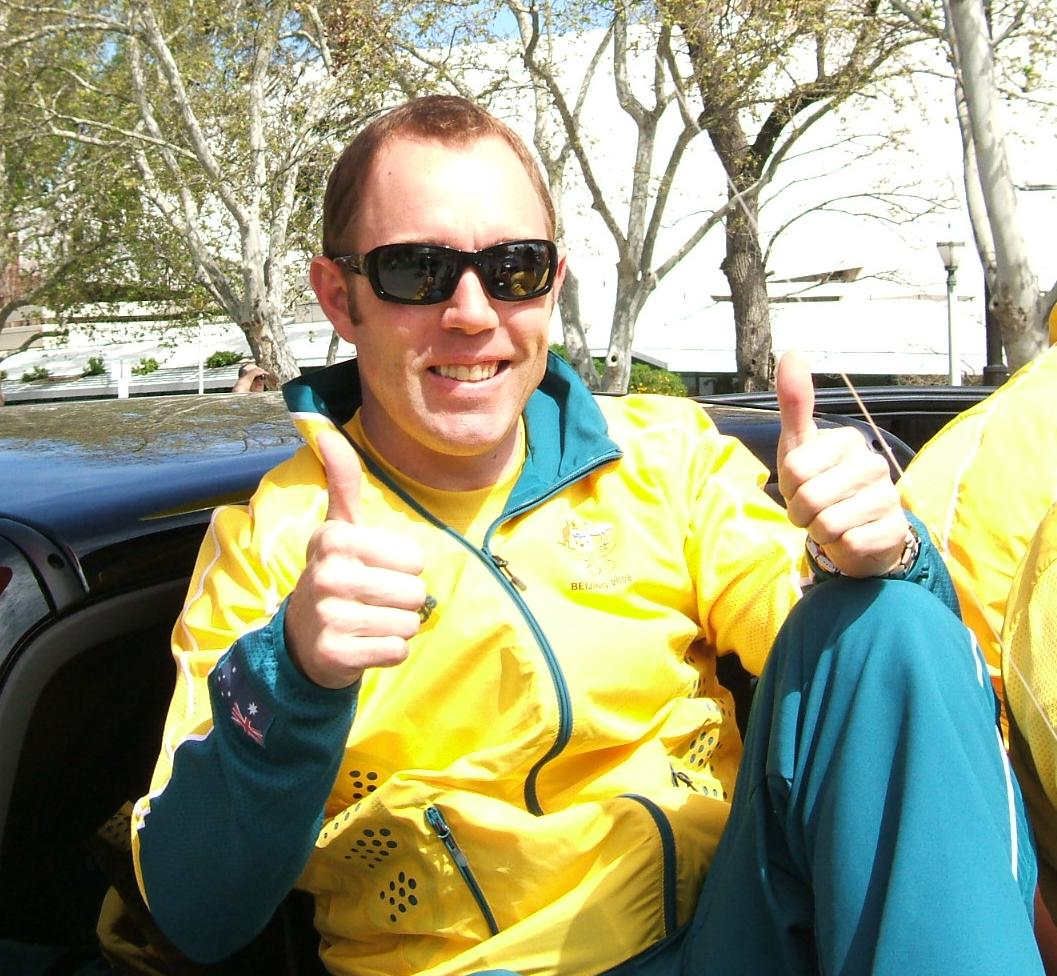
Kelly at the 2008 Summer Olympics welcome home parade, Adelaide

Kelly began cycling at the age of five. He achieved success as a junior, winning the junior Kilo at the Australian National Track Championships.

Kelly has competed in five Olympic Games. He won a silver medal in the 1000 m time trial at the 1992 Summer Olympics. Kelly is well known for an infamous mishap in the cycling at the 1996 Summer Olympics. Going into the Kilo event, he was the world record holder and strong favourite. However, his foot ripped from the pedal at the start, and he did not start racing. Kelly won a bronze medal at the 2000 Summer Olympics, and came fourth at the 2004 Summer Olympics. Also in 2004 he competed in the Keirin event, winning a bronze medal. He was fourth across the line, but another cyclist was disqualified for dangerous riding. The 1000m time trial event was removed from the Olympic program after 2004. At the 2008 Summer Olympics Kelly came fourth in the Keirin.

Kelly was the world champion in the kilo for three consecutive times, from 1995 to 1997. He also competed at the Commonwealth Games, winning gold in the 1000 m time trial in 1994 and 1998. Kelly has also won a World Championship in the Team Sprint in 1996.

== Awards and honours ==
Kelly was awarded the title of Australian Cyclist of the Year in 1996, and Australian Male Track Cyclist of the Year in 1996, 1997, 1998 and 1999. In 2001, he was inducted into the Australian Institute of Sport 'Best of the Best'. He was also awarded the medal of the Order of Australia on Australia Day in 2004.

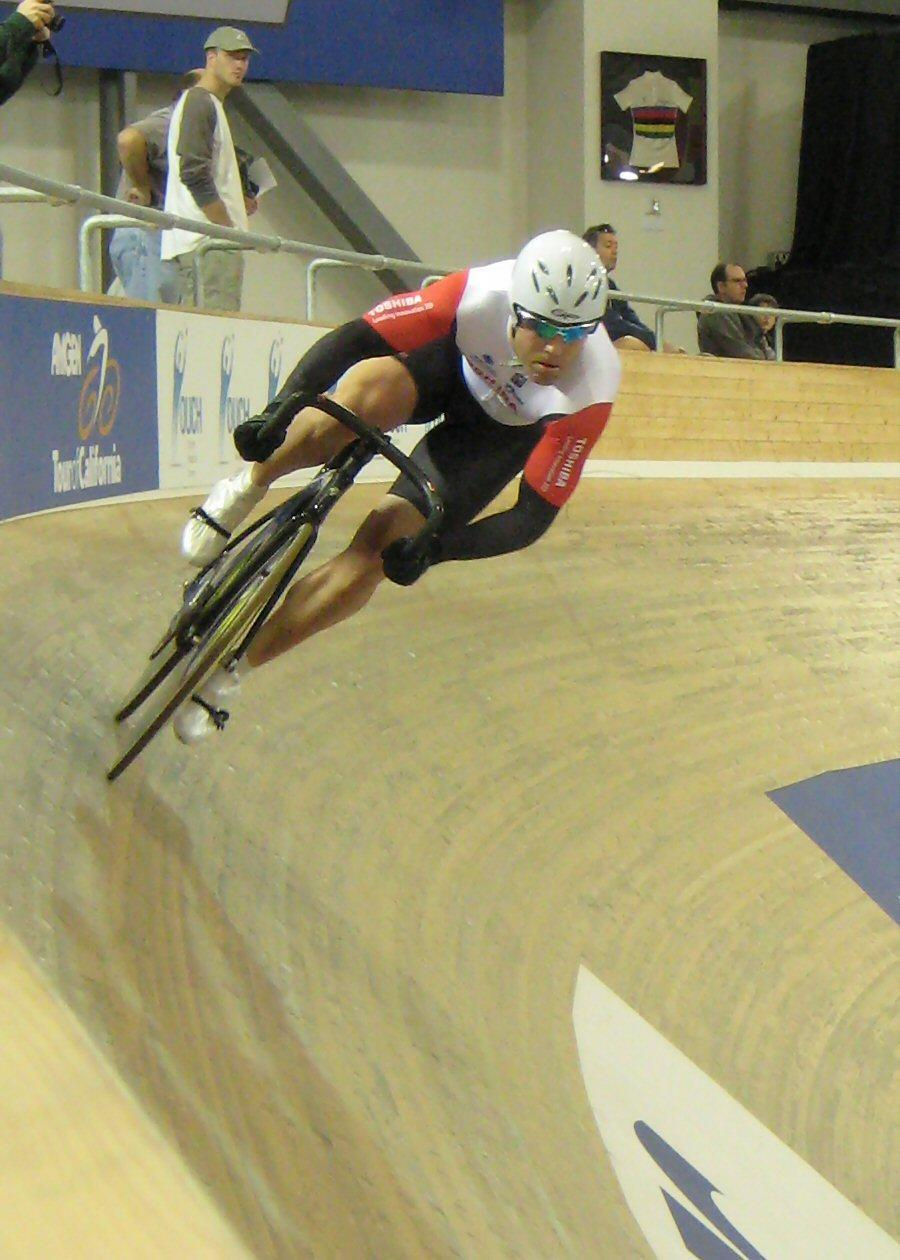
Kelly competing at the 2008 UCI Track World Cup, Los Angeles

== Major results ==
1990
1st Kilo, Australian National Track Championships - Juniors
1st Elimination Race, Australian National Track Championships - Juniors
3rd Scratch, Australian National Track Championships - Juniors
2nd Sprint, Australian National Track Championships - Juniors
3rd Kilo, UCI Track Cycling World Championships - Juniors
1st Elimination Race, UCI Track Cycling World Championships - Juniors

1991
1st Kilo, Australian National Track Championships
3rd Elimination Race, Australian National Track Championships

1992
2nd Kilo, Summer Olympics

1993
2nd Kilo, 1993 UCI Track Cycling World Championships

1994
1st Kilo, Commonwealth Games
2nd Kilo, Australian National Track Championships, Adelaide, SA (AUS)
3rd Kilo, 1994 UCI Track Cycling World Championships

1995
Kilo, World Record
1st Kilo, 1995 UCI Track Cycling World Championships

1996
1st Kilo, Australian National Track Championships, Perth, WA (AUS)
3rd Keirin, Australian National Track Championships, Perth, WA (AUS)
1st Kilo, 1996 UCI Track Cycling World Championships
1st Team Sprint, 1996 UCI Track Cycling World Championships (with Darryn William Hill & Gary Neiwand)

1997
1st Kilo, 1997 UCI Track Cycling World Championships
3rd Team Sprint, 1997 UCI Track Cycling World Championships

1998
1st Kilo, Commonwealth Games
2nd Kilo, 1998 UCI Track Cycling World Championships
2nd Team Sprint, 1998 UCI Track Cycling World Championships

1999
2nd Kilo, Australian National Track Championships
1st Keirin, Australian National Track Championships
2nd Kilo, Oceania International Track Grand Prix
2nd Team Sprint, Oceania International Track Grand Prix
2nd Kilo, Frisco
2nd Team Sprint, Frisco
2nd Kilo, 1999 UCI Track Cycling World Championships

2000
2nd Kilo, Australian National Track Championships
2nd Team sprint, Australian National Track Championships
3rd Kilo, Summer Olympics
2nd Kilo, Cali

2001
1st Kilo, Oceania Track Cycling Championships

2002
2nd Kilo, Australian National Track Championships
3rd Kilo, 2002 UCI Track Cycling World Championships

2003
2nd Kilo, 2003 UCI Track Cycling World Championships
3rd Kilo, Cape Town
3rd Team Sprint, Cape Town
1st Kilo, Sydney
2nd Team Sprint, Sydney

2004
2nd Keirin, Cottbus
1st Keirin, Oceania Track Cycling Championships
1st Kilo, Oceania Track Cycling Championships
2nd Sprint,Oceania Track Cycling Championships
1st Keirin, Manchester
1st Kilo, Australian National Track Championships
2nd Keirin, Oceania Games
1st Team Sprint, Oceania Games, (with Ben Kersten & Jason Niblett)

2005
2nd Keirin, Oceania Track Cycling Championships
1st Team Sprint, Oceania Track Cycling Championships
1st Keirin, Sydney Thousand
3rd Keirin, Manchester
2nd Sprint, Australian National Track Championships
1st Team sprint, Australian National Track Championships (with Joel Leonard & Jason Niblett)
3rd Keirin, 2005 UCI Track Cycling World Championships

2006
1st Keirin, Los Angeles
3rd Team Sprint, Los Angeles
3rd Team Sprint, Commonwealth Games
3rd Team Sprint, 2006 UCI Track Cycling World Championships

2007
1st Keirin, Oceania Track Cycling Championships
1st Team Sprint, Oceania Track Cycling Championships (with Ryan Bayley & Daniel Ellis)
1st Team Sprint, Sydney (with Ryan Bayley & Daniel Ellis)

2008
1st Team sprint, Australian National Track Championships (with Mark French & Shane Perkins)
2nd Keirin, Australian National Track Championships
