= Damien Pommereau =

French cyclist (born 1978)

Personal information
- Born: 12 May 1978 (age 48) Villepinte, Seine-Saint-Denis, France
- Height: 1.82 m (6 ft 0 in)
- Weight: 68 kg (150 lb)

Cycling career
- Sport: Cycling
- Current team: Retired
- Disciplines: Track; Road
- Role: Rider

Amateur teams
- 1999: CM Aubervilliers 93
- 2002: VC Rouen 76
- 2003: VC Beauvais
- 2004: Pays d'Olonne Cyclisme
- 2005: UC Cholet
- 2006: POC Côte de Lumière

Professional team
- 2000–2001: Cofidis
Medal record
Men's track cycling
Representing France
World Championships
Bronze medal – third place	2000 Manchester	Team pursuit
European Championships
Gold medal – first place	1999	Madison

Damien Pommereau (born 12 May 1978) is a French former cyclist, who specialized in track races. He won a bronze medal in the team pursuit at the 2000 UCI Track Cycling World Championships.

== Major results ==
1996
1st Madison, National Junior Track Championships
1997
2nd Points race, National Track Championships
1998
1st Team pursuit – Cali, UCI World Cup Classics
1999
UCI World Cup Classics

1st Team pursuit – Mexico
2nd Team pursuit – San Francisco

1st Madison, UEC European Track Championships (with Robert Sassone)
1st Points race, National Under-23 Track Championships
2000
1st Team pursuit, National Track Championships
3rd Team pursuit, UCI World Championships
3rd Team pursuit – Moscow, UCI World Cup Classics
2001
1st Overall Individual pursuit, UCI World Cup Classics

1st Mexico
3rd Cali

2nd Individual pursuit, National Track Championships
2002
6th Overall Circuit des Ardennes International
2004
3rd Points race, National Track Championships
