= Franck Perque =

French cyclist

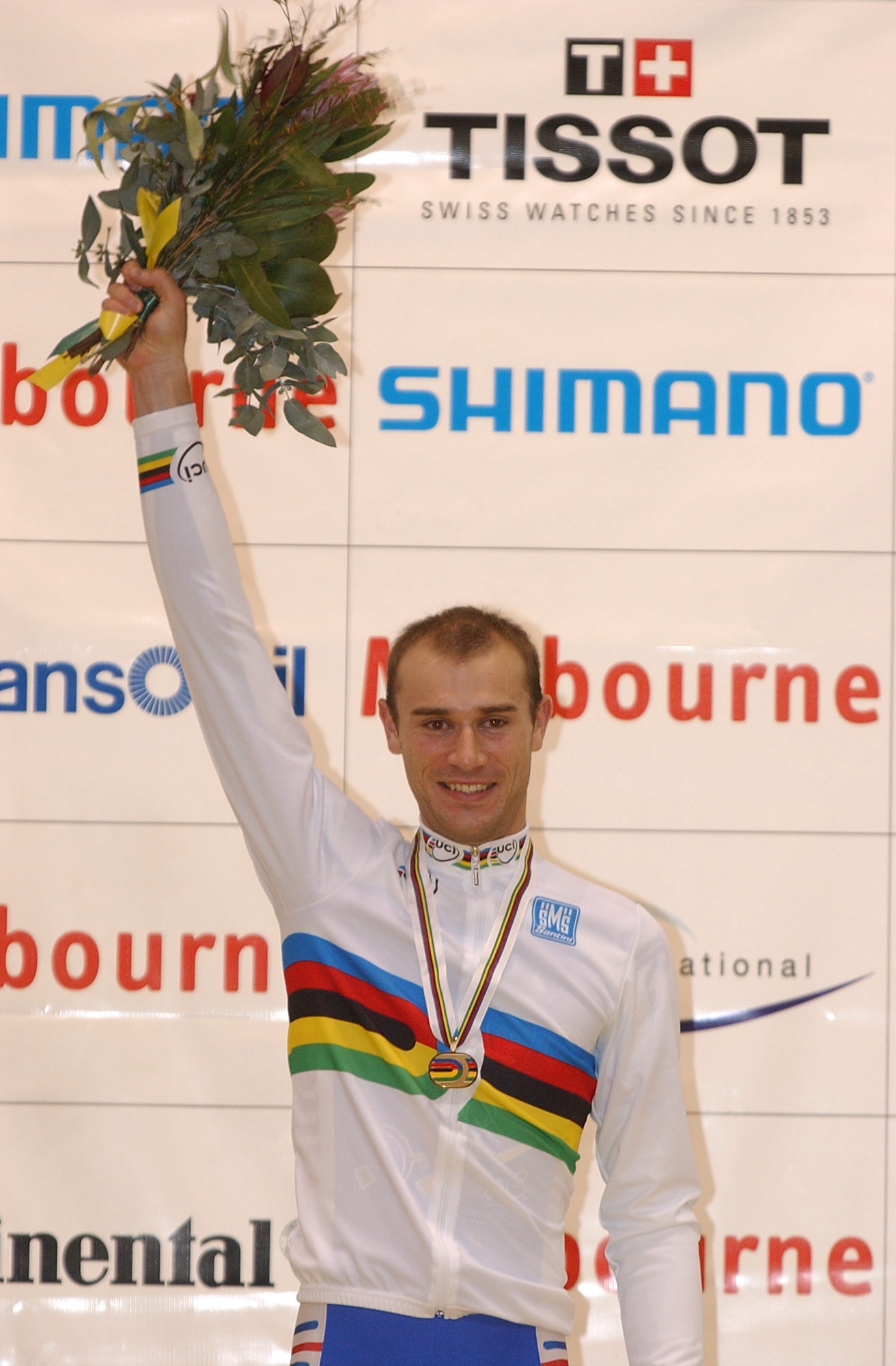
- Perque in 2004

Personal information
- Born: 30 November 1974 (age 51) Amiens, France

Cycling career
- Sport: Cycling
- Current team: Retired
- Disciplines: Road, track
- Role: Rider

Professional team
- 1997–2002: Française des Jeux
Medal record
Representing France
Men's track cycling
UCI Track World Championships
Gold medal – first place	2004 Melbourne	Points race
Gold medal – first place	2002 Copenhagen	Madison

Franck Perque (born 30 November 1974) is a French former racing cyclist.

== Palmares ==
=== Road ===
1996
1st Paris–Tours Espoirs

1998

1st Stage 5 Tour de Normandie
2004
2nd Grand Prix de la Ville de Lillers
2006
1st Ronde de l'Oise

1st stages 1 & 3a (TTT)

=== Track ===
2000
National points race champion
2006
National points race champion
