= Magali Faure-Humbert =

French cyclist (born 1972)

Magali Humbert-Faure
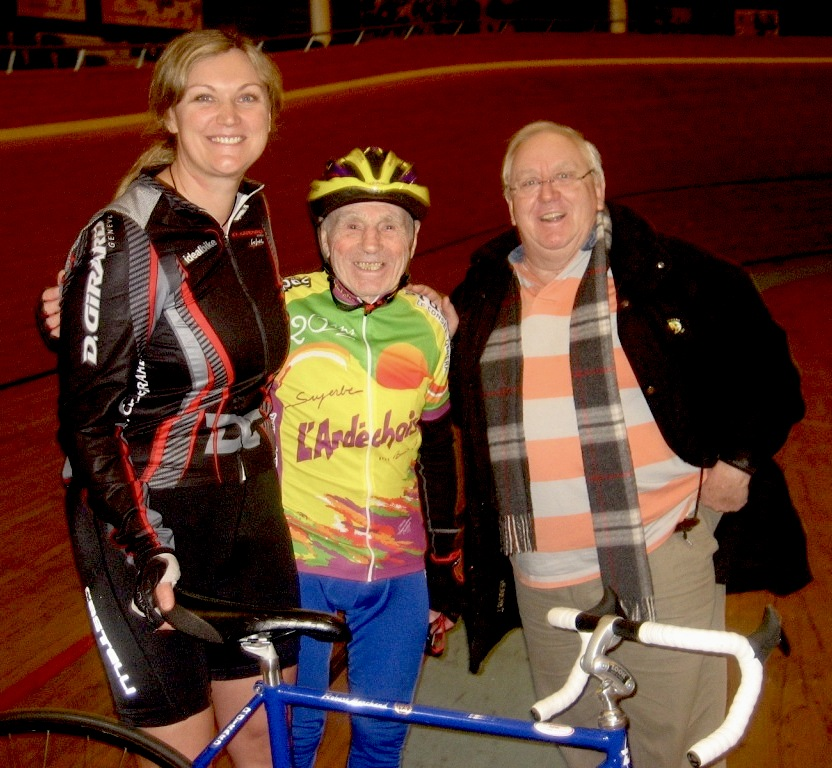

Personal information
- Born: 21 January 1972 (age 54) Bar-le-Duc, Meuse, France

Cycling career
- Sport: Cycling

Magali Humbert-Faure (born 21 January 1972) is a French former cyclist. She competed in the women's 500 metres time trial at the 2000 Summer Olympics. In 2012, she coached centenarian cyclist Robert Marchand with Robert Mistler for his 100+ Masters records.
