= Frédéric Lancien =

French cyclist

Personal information
- Born: 14 February 1971 (age 55) Concarneau, France

Cycling career
- Sport: Cycling

Frédéric Lancien (born 14 February 1971) is a French former cyclist. He competed in the track time trial at the 1992 Summer Olympics.
