= Florian Rousseau =

French track cyclist

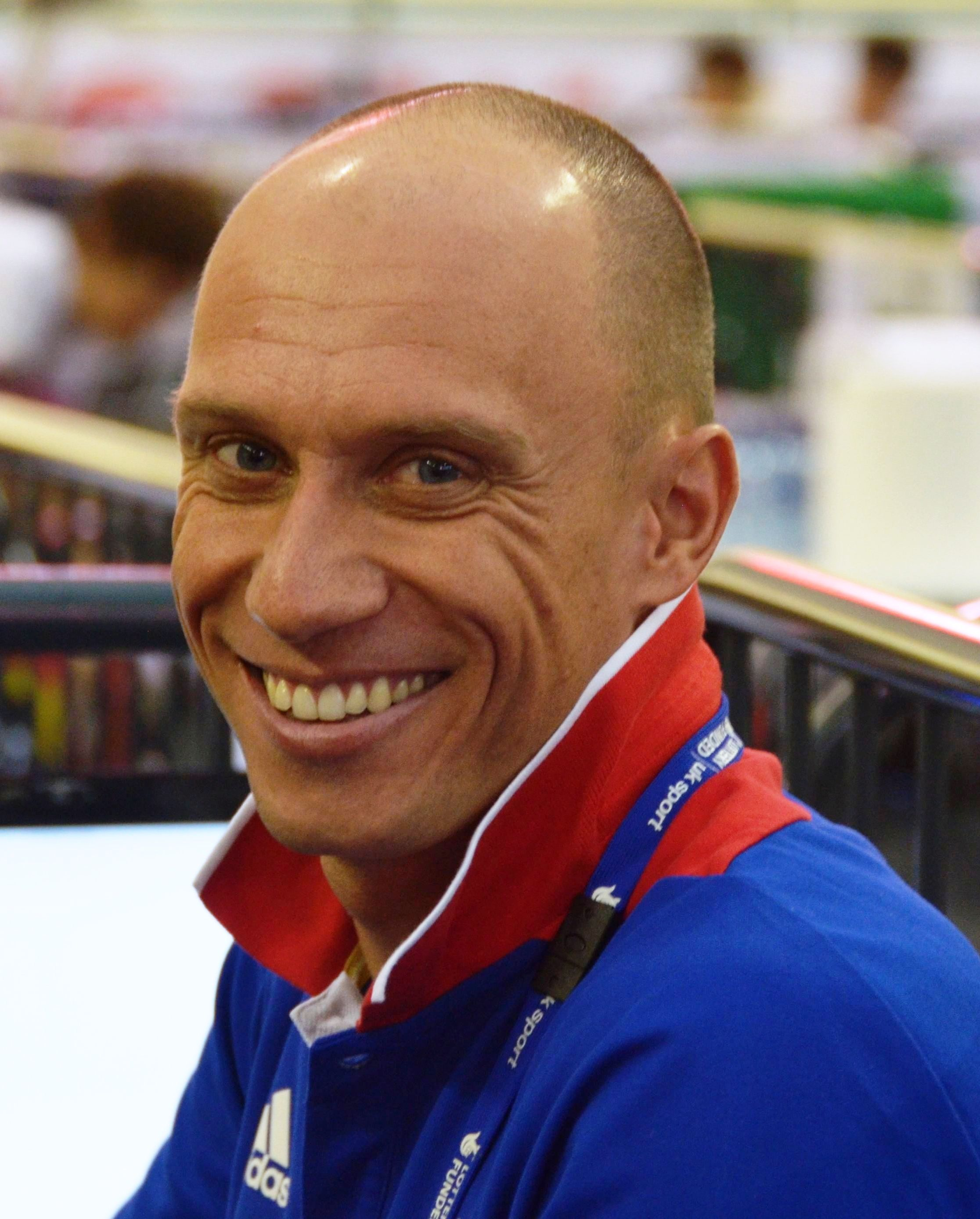
- Rousseau (2012)

Personal information
- Full name: Florian Rousseau
- Born: 3 February 1974 (age 52) Orléans, France

Cycling career
- Sport: Cycling
- Discipline: Track
- Role: Rider & Coach
Medal record
Men's track cycling
Representing France
Olympic Games
Gold medal – first place	1996 Atlanta	1000 m time trial
Gold medal – first place	2000 Sydney	Team sprint
Gold medal – first place	2000 Sydney	Keirin
Silver medal – second place	2000 Sydney	Sprint
UCI Track World Championships
Gold medal – first place	1993 Hamar	1000 m time trial
Gold medal – first place	1994 Palermo	1000 m time trial
Gold medal – first place	1996 Manchester	Sprint
Gold medal – first place	1997 Perth	Sprint
Gold medal – first place	1997 Perth	Team sprint
Gold medal – first place	1998 Bordeaux	Sprint
Gold medal – first place	1998 Bordeaux	Team sprint
Gold medal – first place	1999 Berlin	Team sprint
Gold medal – first place	2000 Manchester	Team sprint
Gold medal – first place	2001 Antwerp	Team sprint
Silver medal – second place	1995 Bogota	1000 m time trial
Silver medal – second place	1995 Bogota	Team sprint
Bronze medal – third place	1996 Manchester	Team sprint
Bronze medal – third place	1999 Berlin	Sprint
Bronze medal – third place	2001 Antwerp	Sprint
Bronze medal – third place	2002 Copenhagen	Sprint

Florian Rousseau (born 3 February 1974) is a former French track cyclist who won three gold medals and one silver at the Summer Olympics (1996 and 2000). He was popular among spectators for the facial expressions he pulled - many of them seeming to make his eyes bulge - to help him concentrate at the start of races. In retirement he became one of France's national sprint coaches.

== Youth ==
Rousseau spent much of his childhood and went to school in Patay. He began as a soccer player but, seeing no future in team sports, switched to cycling. He showed early talent on the track and joined the national sports institute, INSEP, in western Paris in 1990. He won the world junior kilometre championship in 1992 and the world senior championship in 1993 and 1994.

== Career ==
Florian Rousseau's win in the 1996 Olympic Games in Atlanta, United States, started a golden period for French track cycling that lasted four years. He won the kilometre at Atlanta but dropped the discipline to become a sprinter. He was trained by Gérard Quintyn and won the world sprint championship in 1996 to 1998. He won three Olympic gold medals and a silver. He was world team sprint champion in 1997 and 1998 and won the national sprint championship 17 times.

== Management ==
Florian Rousseau was the national sprint coach at INSEP, in western Paris. He resigned shortly after the 2013 Cycling World Championships in Minsk

Rousseau was appointed as the inaugural president of the UCI Athletes' Commission in 2011.

== Outside cycling ==
Rousseau is married to Sonia, and a scuba-diver in his spare time, particularly in the Caribbean and off Australia.

== Major results ==
1992
1st Kilo, World Championships - Junior
3rd Sprint, French National Track Championships - Junior

1993
1st Kilo, World Championships
1st Kilo, French National Track Championships

1994
1st Kilo, World Championships
1st Kilo, French National Track Championships
UCI Track Cycling World Cup Classics champion

1995
2nd Kilo, World Championships
2nd Sprint, World Championships
1st Kilo, French National Track Championships
1st Sprint, French National Track Championships

1996
1st Kilo, Olympic Games
1st Sprint, World Championships
3rd world team sprint championship
1st Kilo, Sprint, French National Track Championships
1st Sprint, French National Track Championships

1997
1st Sprint, World Championships
1st Team sprint, World Championships
1st Sprint, French National Track Championships

1998
1st Sprint, World Championships
1st Team sprint, World Championships
1st Sprint, French National Track Championships
1st Keirin, French National Track Championships

1999
1st Team sprint, World Championships
3rd Sprint, World Championships

2000
1st Keirin, Olympic Games
1st Team sprint, Olympic Games
2nd Sprint, Olympic Games
1st Team sprint, World Championships
1st Sprint, French National Track Championships

2001
1st Team sprint, World Championships
3rd Sprint, World Championships
2nd Sprint, French National Track Championships
3rd Keirin, French National Track Championships

2002
3rd Sprint, World Championships
3rd Sprint, French National Track Championships
