= Jérôme Neuville =

French cyclist

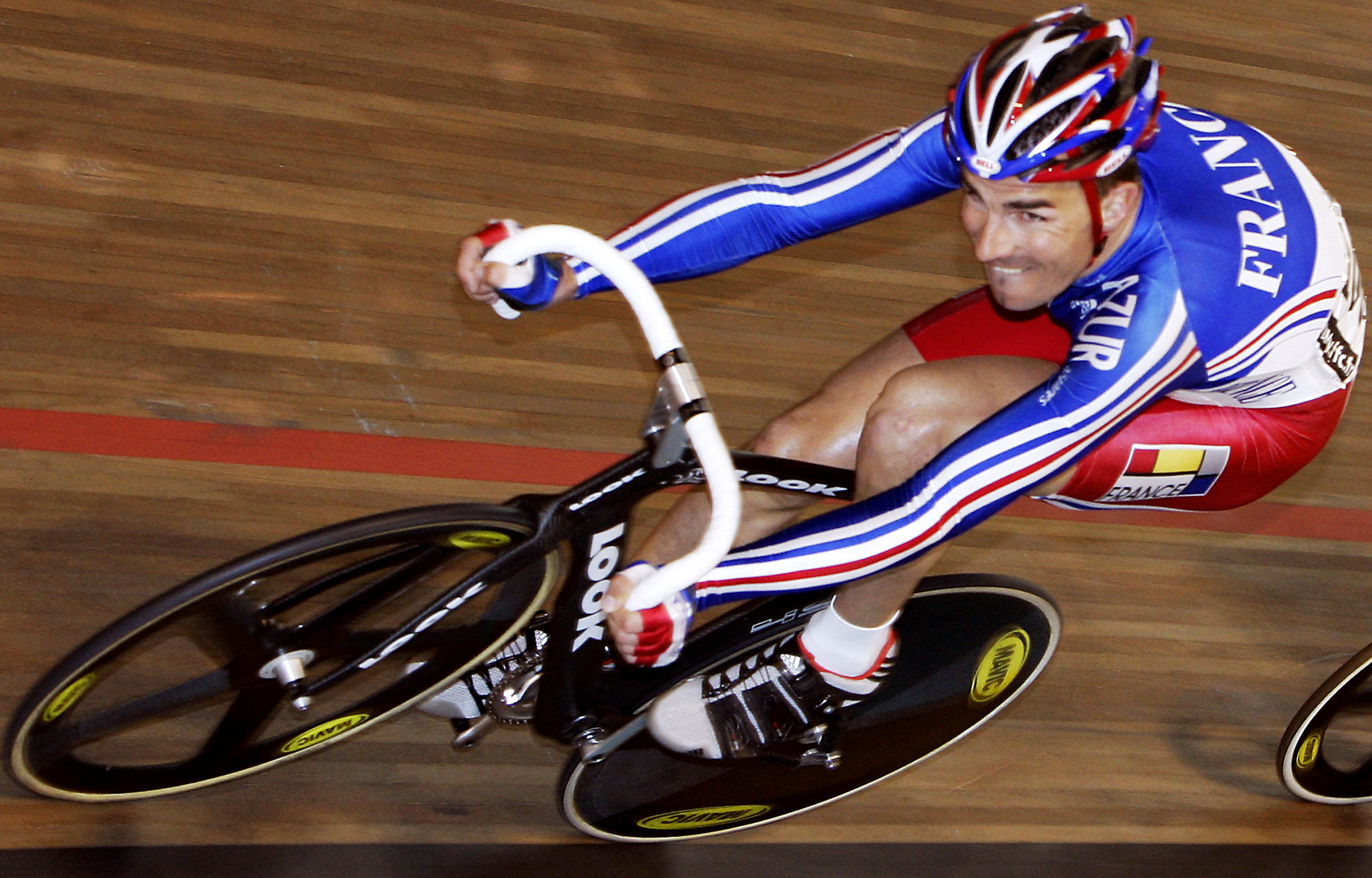

Personal information
- Full name: Jérôme Neuville
- Born: 15 August 1975 (age 51) Saint-Martin d'Hères, France
- Height: 1.92 m (6 ft 4 in)
- Weight: 85 kg (187 lb; 13.4 st)

Cycling career
- Sport: Cycling
- Disciplines: Track & Road
- Role: Rider

Amateur team
- 2003: AVC Aix-en-Provence

Professional teams
- 1999–2001: Crédit Agricole
- 2002: Cofidis
Medal record
Men's track cycling
Representing France
UCI Track Cycling World Championships
Gold medal – first place	2001 Antwerp	Madison
Gold medal – first place	2006 Bordeaux	Scratch

Jérôme Neuville (born 15 August 1975 in Saint-Martin d'Hères, Isère) is a French racing cyclist.

He had a break in his track cycling career between 1999 and 2002, during which time he competed on the road as a professional cyclist with the Crédit Agricole team (1999 to 2001), and Cofidis (2002). Cofidis did not renew his contract so in 2003, Neuvile joined the amateur club AVC Aix-en-Provence.

He has competed at 4 Olympic Games in Atlanta, Sydney, Athens and Beijing.

== Palmarès ==
1996
1st Omnium, European Track Championships

1997
1st Omnium, European Track Championships
1st (France) Madison, French National Track Championships

1998
1st, Duo Normand (with Magnus Bäckstedt)

1999
1st (France) Madison, French National Track Championships

2001
1st Madison, UCI Track Cycling World Championships
1st (France) Pursuit, French National Track Championships

2002
1st Madison, UCI Track Cycling World Championships

2003
1st (France) Pursuit, French National Track Championships
1st (France) Madison, French National Track Championships

2005
1st (France) Madison, French National Track Championships

2006
1st Scratch Race, UCI Track Cycling World Championships
