= 1997 UCI Track Cycling World Cup Classics =

International track cycling competition

The 1997 UCI Track Cycling World Cup Classics is a multi race tournament over a season of track cycling. The competition ran from May 23 to August 17, 1997. The World Cup is organised by the UCI.

== Results ==
=== Men ===
Event	Winner	Second	Third
Colombia, Cali — 23–25 May 1997
Keirin	Marty Nothstein (USA)	Frédéric Magné (FRA)	Jean Pierre Van Zyl (RSA)
1 km time trial	Sören Lausberg (GER)	José Antonio Escuredo (ESP)	Herve Robert Thuet (FRA)
Individual pursuit	Alexei Markov (RUS)	Christian Vande Velde (USA)	Juan Martínez Oliver (ESP)
Team pursuit	Russia; Eduard Gritsun; Nikolay Kuznetsov; Alexei Markov	New Zealand; Gary Anderson; Brendon Cameron; Timothy Carswell; Lee Vertongen	Spain; Adolfo Alperi; Miguel Alzamora; Isaac Gálvez; Ivan Herrero
Sprint	Marty Nothstein (USA)	Arnaud Tournant (FRA)	Eyk Pokorny (GER)
Points race	Pavel Khamidouline (RUS)	Juan Llaneras (ESP)	Juan Curuchet (ARG)
Team Sprint	Greece; Georgios Chimonetos; Dimitrios Georgalis; Lampros Vasilopoulos	Germany; Jens Fiedler; Sören Lausberg; Eyk Pokorny	Australia; Denny Day; Sean Eadie; Darryn Hill
Madison	Spain; Miguel Alzamora; Joan Llaneras	Argentina; Gabriel Curuchet; Juan Curuchet	New Zealand; Gary Anderson; Glen Thomson
United States, Trexlertown — 29–31 May 1997
Keirin	Darryn Hill (AUS)	Marty Nothstein (USA)	Eyk Pokorny (GER)
1 km time trial	Arnaud Tournant (FRA)	Grzegorz Krejner (POL)	José Antonio Escuredo (ESP)
Individual pursuit	Alexei Markov (RUS)	Christian Vande Velde (USA)	Juan Martínez Oliver (ESP)
Team pursuit	Russia; Anton Chantyr; Eduard Gritsun; Nikolay Kuznetsov; Alexei Markov	United States; Mariano Friedick; Adam Laurent; Adam Payne; Christian Vande Velde	Spain; Adolfo Alperi; Miguel Alzamora; Isaac Gálvez; Ivan Herrero
Sprint	Darryn Hill (AUS)	Marty Nothstein (USA)	Eyk Pokorny (GER)
Points race	Brian Walton (CAN)	Julian Dean (NZL)	Michael Sandstød (DEN)
Team Sprint	Greece; Dimitrios Georgalis; Georgios Chimonetos; Lampros Vasilopoulos	France; Frédéric Magné; Herve Thuet; Arnaud Tournant	Poland; Grzegorz Krejner; Marcin Mientki; Grzegorz Trebski
Madison	Spain; Miguel Alzamora; Juan Llaneras	Australia; Brett Aitken; Stephen Pate	Argentina; Gabriel Curuchet; Juan Curuchet
Italy, Fiorenzuola — 20–22 June 1997
Keirin	Darryn Hill (AUS)		
1 km time trial	Stefan Nimke (GER)	Grzegorz Krejner (POL)	Frederic Lancien (FRA)
Individual pursuit	Andrea Collinelli (ITA)	Jens Lehmann (GER)	Robert Karsnicki (POL)
Team pursuit	Ukraine	Germany	Italy
Sprint	Marty Nothstein (USA)	Darryn Hill (AUS)	Jan van Eijden (GER)
Points race	Bruno Risi (SUI)		
Team Sprint	Poland	Great Britain	Japan
Madison	Germany; Carsten Wolf; Peter Fust		
Italy, Quartu Sant'Elena — 27–29 June 1997
Keirin	Marty Nothstein (USA)	Aleksandr Kirichenko (RUS)	Sergey Panasenko (UKR)
1 km time trial	Grzegorz Krejner (POL)	Craig MacLean (GBR)	Damien Gerard (FRA)
Individual pursuit	Bradley McGee (AUS)	Heiko Szonn (GER)	Alexander Symonenko (UKR)
Team pursuit	Ukraine; Bogdan Bondarev; Alexander Symonenko; Sergiy Matveyev; Oleksandr Fedenko	Italy Mario Benetton; Adler Capelli; Michele Canevarolo; Andrea Collinelli	Germany
Sprint	Viesturs Bērziņš (LAT)	Ainārs Ķiksis (LAT)	Marty Nothstein (USA)
Points race	Guido Fulst (GER)	Silvio Martinello (ITA)	Bruno Risi (SUI)
Team Sprint	Poland; Grzegorz Krejner; Marcin Mientki; Grzegorz Trebski	Netherlands	Russia
Madison	Switzerland; Kurt Betschart; Bruno Risi	Italy; Silvio Martinello; Marco Villa	Netherlands
Greece, Athens — 4–6 July 1997
Keirin	Pavel Buráň (CZE)	Ainārs Ķiksis (LAT)	Michael Scheurer (GER)
1 km time trial	José Antonio Escuredo (ESP)	Grzegorz Krejner (POL)	Dimitrios Georgalis (GRE)
Individual pursuit	Stefan Steinweg (GER)	Philippe Ermenault (FRA)	Michael Sandstød (DEN)
Team pursuit	Great Britain; Jonathan Clay; Matthew Illingworth; Bryan Steel; Philip West	Denmark; Frederik Bertelsen; Tayeb Braikia; Michael Sandstød; Jacob Piil	France; Philippe Ermenault; Carlos Da Cruz; Franck Perque; Jérôme Neuville
Points race	Michael Sandstød (DEN)	Bruno Risi (SUI)	Juan Curuchet (ARG)
Sprint	Ainārs Ķiksis (LAT)	Lars Nielsen (DEN)	Viesturs Bērziņš (LAT)
Team Sprint	Greece; Dimitrios Georgalis; Georgios Chimonetos; Lampros Vasilopoulos	Spain; José Antonio Escuredo; Salvador Meliá; José Manuel Moreno Perinan	Great Britain; Chris Hoy; Craig MacLean; Craig Percival
Madison	Denmark; Jakob Piil; Tayeb Braikia	Italy; Silvio Martinello; Marco Villa	Great Britain; Jonathan Clay; Bryan Steel
Australia, Adelaide — 15–17 August 1997
Keirin	Marty Nothstein (USA)	Jean Pierre Van Zyl (RSA)	Sergey Panasenko (UKR)
1 km time trial	Graham Sharman (AUS)	Grzegorz Krejner (POL)	Takanobu Jumonji (JPN)
Individual pursuit	Christian Vande Velde (USA)	Stuart O'Grady (AUS)	Robert Karsnicki (POL)
Team pursuit	New Zealand	United States	Australia
Points race	Stuart O'Grady (AUS)	Jakob Piil (DEN)	Glen Thomson (NZL)
Sprint	Jean-Pierre Van Zyl (RSA)	Ainārs Ķiksis (LAT)	Sean Eadie (AUS)
Team Sprint	Australia; Sean Eadie; Anthony Peden; Danny Day	Poland	New Zealand
Madison	Switzerland; Kurt Betschart; Bruno Risi	Australia A Brett Aitken; Stephen Pate	Australia B Stuart O'Grady; Baden Cooke

=== Women ===
Event	Winner	Second	Third
Colombia, Cali — 23–25 May 1997
500 m time trial	Félicia Ballanger (FRA)	Galina Enioukhina (RUS)	Daniela Larreal (VEN)
Individual pursuit	Antonella Bellutti (ITA)	Rasa Mažeikytė (LTU)	Rebecca Twigg (USA)
Sprint	Galina Enioukhina (RUS)	Felicia Michele Ballanger (FRA)	Michele Louise Ferris (AUS)
Points race	Antonella Bellutti (ITA)	Madelin Jorge (CUB)	Nathalie Lancien (FRA)
United States, Trexlertown — 29–31 May 1997
500 m	Galina Enioukhina (RUS)	Antonella Bellutti (ITA)	Michelle Louise Ferris (AUS)
Individual pursuit	Rasa Mažeikytė (LTU)	Lucy Tyler-Sharman (AUS)	Rebecca Twigg (USA)
Sprint	Galina Enioukhina (RUS)	Félicia Ballanger (FRA)	Michele Ferris (AUS)
Points race	Ina Teutenberg (GER)	Rita Razmaite (LTU)	Lioudmila Gorojanskaia (BLR)
Italy, Fiorenzuola — 20–22 June 1997
500 m time trial	Félicia Ballanger (FRA)	Antonella Bellutti (ITA)	Michele Ferris (AUS)
Sprint	Michele Ferris (AUS)	Félicia Ballanger (FRA)	
Individual pursuit	Antonella Bellutti (ITA)	Rasa Mažeikytė (LTU)	Lucy Tyler-Sharman (AUS)
Points race	Elena Chalyk (MDA)	Natalia Karimova (RUS)	Daniela Larreal (VEN)
Italy, Quartu Sant'Elena — 27–29 June 1997
500 m time trial	Olga Grichina (RUS)	Daniela Larreal (VEN)	Antonella Bellutti (ITA)
Sprint	Olga Grichina (RUS)	Freilag (GER)	Oksana Grichina (RUS)
Individual pursuit	Antonella Bellutti (ITA)	Chalijn (MDA)	Yvonne McGregor (GBR)
Points race	Antonella Bellutti (ITA)	Natalia Karimova (RUS)	Chalijn (MDA)
Greece, Athens — 4–6 July 1997
500 m time trial	Félicia Ballanger (FRA)	Antonella Bellutti (ITA)	Olga Grichina (RUS)
Sprint	Félicia Ballanger (FRA)	Oksana Grichina (RUS)	Olga Grichina (RUS)
Individual pursuit	Yvonne McGregor (GBR)	Antonella Bellutti (ITA)	Judith Arndt (GER)
Points race	Antonella Bellutti (ITA)	Judith Arndt (GER)	Michaela Brunngraber (AUT)
Australia, Adelaide — 15–17 August 1997
500 m time trial	Cuihua Jiang (CHN)	Michelle Ferris (AUS)	Antonella Bellutti (ITA)
Sprint	Tanya Dubnicoff (CAN)	Lori-Ann Muenzer (CAN)	Jennie Reed (USA)
Individual pursuit	Antonella Bellutti (ITA)	Karen Kurreck (USA)	Karen Barrow (AUS)
Points race	Yan Wang (CHN)	Nicole Reinhart (USA)	Alessandra D'Ettorre (ITA)
