= 1998 UCI Track Cycling World Cup Classics =

International track cycling competition

The 1998 UCI Track Cycling World Cup Classics is a multi race tournament over a season of track cycling. The season ran from 21 May 1998 to 6 September 1998. The World Cup is organised by the UCI.

== Results ==
=== Men ===
Event	Winner	Second	Third
Colombia, Cali — 22–24 May 1998
Individual pursuit	Luke Roberts (AUS)	Stefan Steinweg (GER)	Robert Karsnicki (POL)
1 km time trial	Stefan Nimke (GER)	José Antonio Escuredo (ESP)	Dimitris Georgalis (GRE)
Team pursuit	France; Fabien Merciris; Damien Pommereau; Jérôme Neuville; Andy Flickinger	Argentina; Gustavo Artacho; Gonzalo Garcia; Walter Pérez; Edgardo Simón	Spain; Adolfo Alperi; Cristobal Forcadell; Isaac Gálvez; Ivan Herrero
Sprint	Arnaud Tournant (FRA)	Marty Nothstein (USA)	Laurent Gané (FRA)
Points race	Juan Llaneras (ESP)	Jean-M Tessier (FRA)	Andrei Minachkine (RUS)
Team sprint	France; Arnaud Tournant; Laurent Gané; Damien Gerard	Germany; Jens Fiedler; Stefan Nimke; Jan van Eijden	Greece; George Chimonetos; Dimitris Georgalis; Labros Vassilopoulos
Madison	Argentina; Gabriel Ovidio Curuchet; Juan Esteban Curuchet	Spain; Isaac Gálvez; Juan Llaneras	Germany; Stefan Steinweg; Mario Vonhof
Keirin	Jens Fiedler (GER)	Laurent Gané (FRA)	Marty Nothstein (USA)
Canada, Victoria — 29–31 May 1998
Individual pursuit	Stefan Steinweg (GER)	Michael Sandstød (DEN)	Brett Lancaster (AUS)
1 km time trial	Erin Hartwell (USA)	Frédéric Lancien (FRA)	Stefan Nimke (GER)
Team pursuit	Australia; Brett Lancaster; Timothy Lyons; Luke Roberts; Michael Rogers	New Zealand; Gary Anderson; Brendon Cameron; Timothy Carswell; Lee Vertongen	Denmark; Tayeb Braikia; Jimmi Madsen; Jakob Piil; Michael Sandstød
Sprint	Frédéric Magné (FRA)	Jan van Eijden (GER)	Jens Fiedler (GER)
Points race	Brian Walton (CAN)	Jimmi Madsen (DEN)	Pavel Khamidouline (RUS)
Team sprint	Poland; Marcin Mientki; Grzegorz Krejner; Grezgorz Trebski	United States; Sky Christopherson; Marty Nothstein; Erin Hartwell	Germany; Jens Fiedler; Sören Lausberg; Eyk Pokorny
Madison	Australia; Luke Roberts; Michael Rogers	Spain; Isaac Gálvez; Juan Llaneras	Denmark; Tayeb Braikia; Jakob Piil
Keirin	Frédéric Magné (FRA)	Marty Nothstein (USA)	Jan van Eijden (GER)
Germany, Berlin — 12–14 June 1998
Individual pursuit	Robert Bartko (GER)	Sergej Matvejev (UKR)	Antonio Taul (ESP)
1 km time trial	Arnaud Tournant (FRA)	Zuran Lausberg (GER)	Grzgorz Krenjene (POL)
Team pursuit	Germany; Guido Fulst; Daniel Becke; Christian Lademann; Robert Bartko	Ukraine; Alexander Fedenko; Sergei Chenyavski; Serguei Matveyev; Alexander Symonenko	Russia; Anton Chantyr; Edouard Gritsoun; Nikolay Kuznetsov; Alexei Markov
Sprint	Florian Rousseau (FRA)	Frédéric Magné (FRA)	Viesturs Berzins (LAT)
Points race	Michael Sandstød (DEN)	Rob Hayles (GBR)	Philip Ermanault (FRA)
Team sprint	Germany; Jens Fiedler; Sören Lausberg; Eyk Pokorny	France; Frédéric Magné; Florian Rousseau; Arnaud Tournant	Poland; Marcin Mientki; Grzegorz Krejner; Grezgorz Trebski
Madison	Italy; Silvio Martinello; Andrea Collinelli	Belgium; Etienne De Wilde; Matthew Gilmore	Germany; Guido Furst; Stefan Steinweg
Keirin	Jens Fiedler (GER)	Darryn Hill (AUS)	Jhon González (COL)
France, Hyères — 19–21 June 1998
Individual pursuit	Jens Lehmann (GER)	Andrea Collinelli (ITA)	Alexei Markov (RUS)
1 km time trial	Hervé Robert Thuet (FRA)	Narihiro Inamura (JPN)	Craig MacLean (GBR)
Team pursuit	Italy; Andrea Collinelli; Mario Benetton; Adler Capelli; Cristiano Citton	Ukraine; Ruslan Pidgornyy; Alexander Symonenko; Sergiy Matveyev; Sergiy Chernyavsky	Russia; Anton Chantyr; Edouard Gritsoun; Nikolay Kuznetsov; Alexei Markov
Sprint	Laurent Gané (FRA)	Sean Eadie (AUS)	Eyk Pokorny (GER)
Points race	Michael Sandstød (DEN)	Silvio Martinello (ITA)	Bruno Risi (SUI)
Team sprint	France; Hervé Robert Thuet; Laurent Gané; Vincent Le Quellec	Greece; George Chimonetos; Dimitris Georgalis; Labros Vassilopoulos	Great Britain; Craig Percival; Chris Hoy; Craig MacLean
Madison	Italy; Silvio Martinello; Marco Villa	Belgium; Etienne De Wilde; Matthew Gilmore	Switzerland; Bruno Risi; Kurt Betschart
Keirin	Roberto Chiappa (ITA)	Eyk Pokorny (GER)	Viesturs Berzins (LAT)

=== Women ===
Event	Winner	Second	Third
Colombia, Cali — 22–24 May 1998
Individual pursuit	Antonella Bellutti (ITA)	Rasa Mažeikytė (LTU)	Erin Veenstra (USA)
500 m time trial	Magali Faure (FRA)	Michelle Ferris (AUS)	Galina Enioukina (RUS)
Sprint	Magali Faure (FRA)	Michelle Ferris (AUS)	Jennie Reed (USA)
Points race	Antonella Bellutti (ITA)	Erin Veenstra (USA)	Rawea Greenwood (NZL)
Canada, Victoria — 29–31 May 1998
Individual pursuit	Lucy Tyler Sharman (AUS)	Svetlana Samokhvalova (RUS)	Erin Veenstra (USA)
500 m time trial	Magali Faure (FRA)	Michelle Ferris (AUS)	Galina Enukhina (RUS)
Sprint	Magali Faure (FRA)	Michelle Ferris (AUS)	Jennie Reed (USA)
Points race	Antonella Bellutti (ITA)	Erin Veenstra (USA)	Rawea Greenwood (NZL)
Germany, Berlin — 12–14 June 1998
Individual pursuit	Lucy Tyler-Sharman (AUS)	Natalia Karimova (RUS)	Judith Arndt (GER)
500 m time trial	Félicia Ballanger (FRA)	Katerine Frietag (GER)	Jiang Cuihua (CHN)
Sprint	Félicia Ballanger (FRA)	Michelle Ferris (AUS)	Olga Grichina (RUS)
Points race	Judith Arndt (GER)	Antonella Bellutti (ITA)	Lucy Tyler-Sharman (AUS)
France, Hyères — 19–21 June 1998
Individual pursuit	Rasa Mažeikytė (LTU)	Yvonne McGregor (GBR)	Leontien van Moorsel (NED)
500 m time trial	Félicia Ballanger (FRA)	Jiang Cuihua (CHN)	Iryna Yanovych (UKR)
Sprint	Félicia Ballanger (FRA)	Ulrike Weichelt (GER)	Olga Grichina (RUS)
Points race	Natalia Karimova (RUS)	Alayna Burns (AUS)	Karen Dunne (USA)
