= UCI Track Cycling World Cup – Women's points race =

The UCI Track Cycling World Cup – Women's points race are the World Cup points race for women races held at the UCI Track Cycling World Cup.

== Medalists ==
=== 1995 ===
Event	Gold	Silver	Bronze
Round 1 Athens	Catherine Marsal (FRA)	Ingrid Haringa (NED)	Judith Arndt (GER)
Round 2 Cottbus	Janie Eickhoff (USA)	Ina-Yoko Teutenberg (GER)	Maria Jongeling (NED)
Round 3 Adelaide	Nathalie Lancien (FRA)	Félicia Ballanger (FRA)	Sarah Ulmer (NZL)
Round 4 Tokyo	Ina Teutenberg (GER)	Michelle Ferris (AUS)	Ludmilla Gorojanskaya (BLR)
Round 5 Quito	Jacqui Nelson (NZL)	Svetlana Samokhvalova (RUS)	Belem Guerrero (MEX)
Round 6 Manchester	Svetlana Samokhvalova (RUS)	Nathalie Lancien-Even (FRA)	Ingrid Haringa (NED)

=== 1996 ===
Event	Gold	Silver	Bronze
Round 1 Cali	Belem Guerrero (MEX)	Jessica Greico (USA)	Daniela Larreal (VEN)
Round 2 Havana			
Round 3 Athens	Nathalie Lancien-Even (FRA)	Zulfià Zabírova (KAZ)	Maureen Kaila Vergara (ESA)
Round 4 Busto Garolfo			
Round 5 Cottbus	Nathalie Lancien-Even (FRA)	Jeannie Quigley-Eickhoff (USA)	Rita Mažeikytė (LTU)

=== 1997 ===
Event	Gold	Silver	Bronze
Round 1 Cali	Antonella Bellutti (ITA)	Madelin Jorge (CUB)	Nathalie Lancien (FRA)
Round 2 Trexlertown	Ina Teutenberg (GER)	Rita Razmaite (LTU)	Lioudmila Gorojanskaia (BLR)
Round 3 Fiorenzuola	Elena Chalyk (MDA)	Natalia Karimova (RUS)	Daniela Larreal (VEN)
Round 4 Quatro Sant’Elana	Antonella Bellutti (ITA)	Natalia Karimova (RUS)	Chalijn (MDA)
Round 5 Athens	Antonella Bellutti (ITA)	Judith Arndt (GER)	Michaela Brunngraber (AUT)
Round 6 Adelaide	Yan Wang (CHN)	Nicole Reinhart (USA)	Alessandra D'Ettorre (ITA)

=== 1998 ===
Event	Gold	Silver	Bronze
Round 1 Cali	Antonella Bellutti (ITA)	Erin Veenstra (USA)	Rawea Greenwood (NZL)
Round 2 Victoria	Antonella Bellutti (ITA)	Erin Veenstra (USA)	Rawea Greenwood (NZL)
Round 3 Berlin	Judith Arndt (GER)	Antonella Bellutti (ITA)	Lucy Tyler-Sharman (AUS)
Round 4 Hyères	Natalia Karimova (RUS)	Alayna Burns (AUS)	Karen Dunne (USA)

=== 1999 ===
Event	Gold	Silver	Bronze
Round 1 Mexico City	Mandy Poitras (CAN)	Antonella Bellutti (ITA)	Olga Slyusareva (RUS)
Round 2 Frisco	Olga Slyusareva (RUS)	Alayna Burns (AUS)	Anke Wichmann (GER)
Round 3 Valencia	Belem Guerrero (MEX)	Judith Arndt (GER)	Antonella Bellutti (ITA)
Round 4 Fiorenzuola d'Arda	Elena Tchalych (RUS)	Antonella Bellutti (ITA)	Magali Faure (FRA)
Round 5 Cali	Marion Clignet (FRA)	Belem Guerrero (MEX)	Edita Kubelskienė (LTU)
Final standings	Antonella Bellutti (ITA)	Belem Guerrero (MEX)	Olga Slyusareva (RUS)

=== 2000 ===
Event	Gold	Silver	Bronze
Round 1 Moscow	Elena Tchalykh (RUS)	Marion Clignet (FRA)	Antonella Bellutti (ITA)
Round 2 Cali	Alayna Burns (AUS)	Antonella Bellutti (ITA)	Mandy Poitras (CAN)
Round 3 Mexico	Anouska van der Zee (NED)	Belem Guerrero (MEX)	Megan Troxell (USA)
Round 4 Turin	Olga Slyusareva (RUS)	Antonella Bellutti (ITA)	Teodora Ruano Sanchon (ESP)
Round 5 Ipoh	Frances Newstead (GBR)	Rochelle Gilmore (AUS)	Nadejda Vlassova (RUS)

=== 2001 ===
Event	Gold	Silver	Bronze
Round 1 Cali	Belem Guerrero (MEX)	Teodora Ruano (ESP)	Katherine Bates (AUS)
Round 2 Szczecin	Leontien van Moorsel (NED)	Katherine Bates (AUS)	Mirella van Melis (NED)
Round 3 Pordenone	Olga Slyusareva (RUS)	Rochelle Gilmore (AUS)	Anke Wichmann (GER)
Round 4 Mexico	Belem Guerrero (MEX)	Anouska van der Zee (NED)	Erin Mirabella (USA)
Round 5 Ipoh	Christina Becker (GER)	Cathy Moncassin (FRA)	Erin Carter (CAN)
Final standings	Belem Guerrero (MEX)	Katherine Bates (AUS)	Erin Mirabella (USA)

=== 2002 ===
Event	Gold	Silver	Bronze
Round 1 Monterrey	Belem Guerrero (MEX)	Limei Yang (CHN)	Puxiang Zheng (CHN)
Round 2 Sydney	Sarah Hammer (USA)	Cathy Moncassin (FRA)	Sarah Ulmer (NZL)
Round 3 Moscow	Olga Slyusareva (RUS)	Neringa Raudonyte (LTU)	Katherine Bates (AUS)
Round 4 Cali	Belem Guerrero (MEX)	Gema Pascual Torrecilla (ESP)	Anke Wichmann (GER)
Round 5 Kunming	Elena Tchalykh (RUS)	Puxiang Zheng (CHN)	Vera Carrara (ITA)

=== 2003 ===
Event	Gold	Silver	Bronze
Round 1 Moscow	Olga Slyusareva (RUS)	Adrie Visser (NED)	Lyudmyla Vypyraylo (UKR)
Round 2 Aguascalientes	Elena Chalykh (RUS)	Belem Guerrero (MEX)	Vera Koedooder (NED)
Round 3 Cape Town	Svetlana Ivakhonenkova (BLR)	Vera Carrara (ITA)	Cathy Moncassin (FRA)
Round 4 Sydney	Vera Carrara (ITA)	Marion Clignet (FRA)	Sarah Ulmer (NZL)

=== 2004 ===
Event	Gold	Silver	Bronze
Round 1 Moscow	Olga Slyusareva (RUS)	Belem Guerrero Méndez (MEX)	Yoanka González Pérez (CUB)
Round 2 Aguascalientes	Erin Mirabella (USA)	Lada Kozlíková (CZE)	Yoanka González (CUB)
Round 3 Manchester	Katherine Bates (AUS)	Hanka Kupfernagel (GER)	Belem Guerrero Méndez (MEX)
Round 4 Sydney	Alexis Rhodes (AUS)	Lyudmyla Vypyraylo (UKR)	Sarah Ulmer (NZL)

=== 2004–2005 ===
Event	Gold	Silver	Bronze
Round 1 Moscow	Lyudmyla Vypyraylo (UKR)	Rebecca Bertolo (ITA)	Apollinaria Bakova (RUS)
Round 2 Los Angeles	Erin Mirabella (USA)	Alexis Rhodes (AUS)	Adrie Visser (NED)
Round 3 Manchester	Katherine Bates (AUS)	Vera Carrara (ITA)	Alexis Rhodes (AUS)
Round 4 Sydney	Rochelle Gilmore (AUS)	Giorgia Bronzini (ITA)	Yun Mei Wu (CHN)

=== 2005–2006 ===
Event	Gold	Silver	Bronze
Round 1 Moscow	Olga Slyusareva (RUS)	Yoanka González (CUB)	Lada Kozlíková (CZE)
Round 2 Manchester	Sarah Hammer (USA)	Yan Li (CHN)	Gema Pascual Torrecilla (ESP)
Round 3 Carson	Giorgia Bronzini (ITA)	Rebecca Quinn (USA)	Yan Li (CHN)
Round 4 Sydney	Vera Carrara (ITA)	Leire Olaberria (ESP)	Nikki Harris (GBR)

=== 2006–2007 ===
Event	Gold	Silver	Bronze
Round 1 Sydney	Katherine Bates (AUS)	Giorgia Bronzini (ITA)	Li Yan (CHN)
Round 2 Moscow	Giorgia Bronzini (ITA)	Yoanka González Pérez (CUB)	Yulia Arustamova (RUS)
Round 3 Los Angeles	Sarah Hammer (USA)	Yoanka González Pérez (CUB)	Leire Olaberria Dorronsoro (ESP)
Round 4 Manchester	Yoanka González Pérez (CUB)	Belinda Goss (AUS)	Mie Bekker Lacota (DEN)

=== 2007–2008 ===
Event	Gold	Silver	Bronze
Round 1 Sydney	Giorgia Bronzini (ITA) (Safi–Pasta Zara–Manhattan)	Li Yan (CHN)	Jarmila Machačová (CZE)
Round 2 Beijing	Marianne Vos (NED) (DSB Bank Track Team)	Yoanka González (CUB)	Katherine Bates (AUS) (T-Mobile Track Team)
Round 3 Los Angeles	Jarmila Machačová (CZE)	Lee Min-Hye (KOR)	Li Yan (CHN)
Round 4 Copenhagen	Wong Wan Yiu (HKG)	Trine Schmidt (DEN)	Theresa Cliff-Ryan (USA) (Verducci Breakaway Racing)

=== 2008–2009 ===
Event	Gold	Silver	Bronze
Round 1 Manchester	Elizabeth Armitstead (GBR) (Team 100% ME)	Lucy Martin (GBR)	Katie Colclough (GBR) (Team 100% ME)
Round 2 Melbourne	Evgenia Romanyuta (RUS)	Leire Olaberria (ESP)	Belinda Goss (AUS) (Southaustralia.com–AIS)
Round 3 Cali	Giorgia Bronzini (ITA)	Yumari González (CUB)	Tara Whitten (CAN)
Round 4 Beijing	Jarmila Machačová (CZE)	Wang Cui (CHN)	Giorgia Bronzini (ITA)
Round 5 Copenhagen	Ellen van Dijk (NED)	Katie Colclough (GBR) (Team 100% ME)	Shelley Olds (USA)

=== 2009–2010 ===
Event	Gold	Silver	Bronze
Round 1 Manchester	Lizzie Armitstead (GBR)	Yumari González (CUB)	Evgenia Romanyuta (RUS)
Round 2 Melbourne	Giorgia Bronzini (ITA)	Shelley Olds (USA)	Madeleine Sandig (GER)
Round 3 Cali	Giorgia Bronzini (ITA)	Tara Whitten (CAN)	Charlotte Becker (GER)
Round 4 Beijing	Giorgia Bronzini (ITA)	Tara Whitten (CAN)	Charlotte Becker (GER)
Final standings	Giorgia Bronzini (ITA)	Tatsiana Sharakova (BLR)	Yumari González (CUB)

=== 2010–2011 ===
Event	Gold	Silver	Bronze
Round 1 Melbourne	no women's points race in this round		
Round 2 Cali	Giorgia Bronzini (ITA)	Kelly Druyts (BEL)	Aksana Papko (BLR)
Round 3 Beijing	no women's points race in this round		
Round 4 Manchester	no women's points race in this round		

=== 2011–2012 ===
Event	Gold	Silver	Bronze
Round 1 Astana	no women's points race in this round		
Round 2 Cali	no women's points race in this round		
Round 3 Beijing details (PDF)	Aksana Papko (BLR)	Katarzyna Pawłowska (POL)	Victoria Kondel (RUS) (Team RVL)
Round 4 London	no women's points race in this round		

=== 2012–2013 ===
Event	Gold	Silver	Bronze
Round 1 Cali	no women's points race in this round		
Round 2 Glasgow	no women's points race in this round		
Round 3 Aguascalientes details (PDF)	Katarzyna Pawłowska (POL)	Jarmila Machačová (CZE)	Yudelmis Domínguez Massagué (CUB)

=== 2013–2014 ===
Event	Gold	Silver	Bronze
Round 1 Manchester Details (PDF)	Laura Brown (CAN)	Elizabeth Newell (USA)	Jamie Wong (HKG)
Round 2 Aguascalientes Details (PDF)	Stephanie Pohl (GER)	Jasmin Glaesser (CAN)	Jarmila Machačová (CZE)
Round 3 Guadalajara	no women's points race in this round		

== See also ==
- UCI Track Cycling World Cup – Women's individual pursuit
- UCI Track Cycling World Cup – Women's team pursuit
- UCI Track Cycling World Championships – Women's points race
