= UCI Track Cycling World Cup – Women's individual pursuit =

The UCI Track Cycling World Cup – Women's individual pursuit are the World Cup individual pursuit for women races held at the UCI Track Cycling World Cup. The distance raced is 3 kilometres, or twelve laps on a typical indoor velodrome track.

== Medalists ==
=== 1995 ===
Event	Gold	Silver	Bronze
Round 1 Athens	Catherine Marsal (FRA)	Antonella Bellutti (ITA)	Judith Arndt (GER)
Round 2 Cottbus	Oksana Grishina (RUS)	Galina Enioukhina (RUS)	Erika Salumäe (EST)
Round 3 Adelaide	Sarah Ulmer (NZL)	Karen Barrow (AUS)	Ina Teutenberg (GER)
Round 4 Tokyo	Sarah Ulmer (NZL)	Ma Huizhen (CHN)	Karen Barrow (AUS)
Round 5 Quito	Sarah Ulmer (NZL)	Natalia Karimova (RUS)	Anke Wichmann (GER)
Round 6 Manchester	Antonella Bellutti (ITA)	Svetlana Samokhvalova (RUS)	Marion Clignet (FRA)

=== 1996 ===
Event	Gold	Silver	Bronze
Round 1 Cali	Antonella Bellutti (ITA)	Yoanka González (CUB)	Karen Barrow (AUS)
Round 2 Havana			
Round 3 Athens	Antonella Bellutti (ITA)	Judith Arndt (GER)	Yvonne McGregor (GBR)
Round 4 Busto Garolfo	Marion Clignet (FRA)	Antonella Bellutti (ITA)	Lucy Tyler-Sharman (USA)
Round 5 Cottbus			

=== 1997 ===
Event	Gold	Silver	Bronze
Round 1 Cali	Antonella Bellutti (ITA)	Rasa Mažeikytė (LTU)	Rebecca Twigg (USA)
Round 2 Trexlertown	Rasa Mažeikytė (LTU)	Lucy Tyler-Sharman (AUS)	Rebecca Twigg (USA)
Round 3 Fiorenzuola	Antonella Bellutti (ITA)	Rasa Mažeikytė (LTU)	Lucy Tyler-Sharman (AUS)
Round 4 Quatro Sant’Elana	Antonella Bellutti (ITA)	Chalijn (MDA)	Yvonne McGregor (GBR)
Round 5 Athens	Yvonne McGregor (GBR)	Antonella Bellutti (ITA)	Judith Arndt (GER)
Round 6 Adelaide	Antonella Bellutti (ITA)	Karen Kurreck (USA)	Karen Barrow (AUS)

=== 1998 ===
Event	Gold	Silver	Bronze
Round 1 Cali	Antonella Bellutti (ITA)	Rasa Mažeikytė (LTU)	Erin Veenstra (USA)
Round 2 Victoria	Lucy Tyler-Sharman (AUS)	Svetlana Samokhvalova (RUS)	Erin Veenstra (USA)
Round 3 Berlin	Lucy Tyler-Sharman (AUS)	Natalia Karimova (RUS)	Judith Arndt (GER)
Round 4 Hyères	Rasa Mažeikytė (LTU)	Yvonne McGregor (GBR)	Leontien van Moorsel (NED)

=== 1999 ===
Event	Gold	Silver	Bronze
Round 1 Mexico City	Rasa Mažeikytė (LTU)	Yvonne McGregor (GBR)	Leontien Zijlaard-van Moorsel (NED)
Round 2 Frisco	Erin Veenstra (USA)	Sarah Ulmer (NZL)	Natalia Karimova (RUS)
Round 3 Valencia	Rasa Mažeikytė (LTU)	Judith Arndt (GER)	Lucy Tyler-Sharman (AUS)
Round 4 Fiorenzuola d'Arda	Leontien Zijlaard-van Moorsel (NED)	Marion Clignet (FRA)	Elena Tchalych (RUS)
Round 5 Cali	Marion Clignet (FRA)	Sarah Ulmer (NZL)	Natalia Karimova (RUS)
Final standings	Rasa Mažeikytė (LTU)	Marion Clignet (FRA)	Sarah Ulmer (NZL)

=== 2000 ===
Event	Gold	Silver	Bronze
Round 1 Moscow	Leontien Zijlaard-van Moorsel (NED)	Marion Clignet (FRA)	Elena Tchalykh (RUS)
Round 2 Cali	Sarah Ulmer (NZL)	Antonella Bellutti (ITA)	Alayna Burns (AUS)
Round 3 Mexico	Antonella Bellutti (ITA)	Kathryn Watt (AUS)	Anouska van der Zee (NED)
Round 4 Turin	Marion Clignet (FRA)	Sarah Ulmer (NZL)	Olga Slyusareva (RUS)
Round 5 Ipoh	Zhao Haijuan (CHN)	Frances Newstead (GBR)	Nadejda Vlassova (RUS)

=== 2001 ===
Event	Gold	Silver	Bronze
Round 1 Cali	María Luisa Calle (COL)	Emma Davies (GBR)	Elena Tchalykh (RUS)
Round 2 Szczecin	Leontien van Moorsel (NED)	Katherine Bates (AUS)	Lada Kozlíková (CZE)
Round 3 Pordenone	Olga Slyusareva (RUS)	Anouska van der Zee (NED)	Alison Wright (AUS)
Round 4 Mexico	Sarah Ulmer (NZL)	Anouska van der Zee (NED)	Erin Mirabella (USA)
Round 5 Ipoh	Christina Becker (GER)	Diana Žiliūtė (LTU)	Katherine Bates (AUS)
Final standings	Katherine Bates (AUS)	Erin Mirabella (USA)	Anouska van der Zee (NED)

=== 2002 ===
Event	Gold	Silver	Bronze
Round 1 Monterrey	Emma Davies (GBR)	Svetlana Ivahonenkava (BLR)	Olga Slyusareva (RUS)
Round 2 Sydney	Sarah Ulmer (NZL)	Sara Symington (GBR)	Cathy Moncassin (FRA)
Round 3 Moscow	Leontien van Moorsel (NED)	Olga Slyusareva (RUS)	Katherine Bates (AUS)
Round 4 Cali	Rasa Mažeikytė (LTU)	Lada Kozlíková (CZE)	Erin Mirabella (USA)
Round 5 Kunming	Elena Tchalykh (RUS)	Amy Safe (AUS)	Christina Becker (GER)

=== 2003 ===
Event	Gold	Silver	Bronze
Round 1 Moscow	Katherine Bates (AUS)	Svetlana Ivahonenkava (BLR)	Olga Slyusareva (RUS)
Round 2 Aguascalientes	Sarah Ulmer (NZL)	Erin Mirabella (USA)	Rasa Mažeikytė (LTU)
Round 3 Cape Town	Karin Thürig (SUI)	Christina Becker (GER)	Gema Pascual Torrecilla (ESP)
Round 4 Sydney	Sarah Ulmer (NZL)	Diana Žiliūtė (LTU)	Amy Safe (AUS)

=== 2004 ===
Event	Gold	Silver	Bronze
Round 1 Moscow	Karin Thürig (SUI)	Olga Slyusareva (RUS)	Hanka Kupfernagel (GER)
Round 2 Aguascalientes	Sarah Ulmer (NZL)	Elena Tchalykh (RUS)	Emma Davies (GBR)
Round 3 Manchester	Katherine Bates (AUS)	Emma Davies (GBR)	Hanka Kupfernagel (GER)
Round 4 Sydney	Sarah Ulmer (NZL)	Karin Thürig (SUI)	Alexis Rhodes (AUS)

=== 2004–2005 ===
Event	Gold	Silver	Bronze
Round 1 Moscow	Oxana Kostenko (RUS)	Lyudmyla Vypyraylo (UKR)	Marlijn Binnendijk (NED)
Round 2 Los Angeles	Katie Mactier (AUS)	Emma Davies (GBR)	Elena Tchalykh (RUS)
Round 3 Manchester	Katherine Bates (AUS)	Emma Davies (GBR)	Karin Thürig (SUI)
Round 4 Sydney	Marlijn Binnendijk (NED)	Dale Tye (NZL)	Tatsiana Sharakova (BLR)

=== 2005–2006 ===
Event	Gold	Silver	Bronze
Round 1 Moscow	Li Meifang (CHN)	Wendy Houvenaghel (GBR)	Olga Slyusareva (RUS)
Round 2 Manchester	Katherine Bates (AUS)	Sarah Hammer (USA)	Larissa Kleinmann (GER)
Round 3 Carson	Sarah Hammer (USA)	María Luisa Calle (COL)	Yulia Arustamova (RUS)
Round 4 Sydney	Wendy Houvenaghel (GBR)	Li Wang (CHN)	Kristin Armstrong (USA)

=== 2006–2007 ===
Event	Gold	Silver	Bronze
Round 1 Sydney	Katie Mactier (AUS)	Wendy Houvenaghel (GBR)	Vilija Sereikaitė (LTU)
Round 2 Moscow	Wendy Houvenaghel (GBR)	Rebecca Romero (GBR)	Larissa Kleinmann (GER)
Round 3 Los Angeles	Sarah Hammer (USA)	Verena Joos (GER)	María Luisa Calle (COL)
Round 4 Manchester	Wendy Houvenaghel (GBR)	Rebecca Romero (GBR)	Alison Shanks (NZL)

=== 2007–2008 ===
Event	Gold	Silver	Bronze
Round 1 Sydney	Katie Mactier (AUS)	Vilija Sereikaitė (LTU) (Safi–Pasta Zara–Manhattan)	Karin Thürig (SUI)
Round 2 Beijing	Katie Mactier (AUS)	Rebecca Romero (GBR)	Sarah Hammer (USA)
Round 3 Los Angeles	Lesya Kalytovska (UKR)	María Luisa Calle (COL)	Sarah Hammer (USA) (OUCH Pro Cycling)
Round 4 Copenhagen	Rebecca Romero (GBR)	Vilija Sereikaitė (LTU) (Safi–Pasta Zara–Manhattan)	Sarah Hammer (USA)

=== 2008–2009 ===
Event	Gold	Silver	Bronze
Round 1 Manchester	Wendy Houvenaghel (GBR)	Tara Whitten (CAN)	Joanna Rowsell (GBR) (Team 100% ME)
Round 2 Melbourne	Joanna Rowsell (GBR)	Josephine Tomic (AUS)	Lada Kozlíková (CZE)
Round 3 Cali	Vilija Sereikaitė (LTU)	María Luisa Calle (COL)	Tara Whitten (CAN)
Round 4 Beijing	Alison Shanks (NZL)	Vilija Sereikaitė (LTU)	Svitlana Halyuk (UKR)
Round 5 Copenhagen	Ellen van Dijk (NED)	Tara Whitten (CAN)	Joanna Rowsell (GBR) (Team 100% ME)

=== 2009–2010 ===
Event	Gold	Silver	Bronze
Round 1 Manchester	Wendy Houvenaghel (GBR)	Josephine Tomic (AUS)	Vera Koedooder (NED)
Round 2 Melbourne	Wendy Houvenaghel (GBR)	Alison Shanks (NZL)	Lesya Kalytovska (UKR)
Round 3 Cali	Sarah Hammer (USA)	Tara Whitten (CAN)	Vilija Sereikaitė (LTU)
Round 4 Beijing	Alison Shanks (NZL)	Vilija Sereikaitė (LTU)	Tara Whitten (CAN)
Final standings	Alison Shanks (NZL)	Vilija Sereikaitė (LTU)	Tara Whitten (CAN)

=== 2010–2011 ===
Event	Gold	Silver	Bronze
Round 1 Melbourne	no women's individual pursuit in this round		
Round 2 Cali	Alison Shanks (NZL)	Wendy Houvenaghel (GBR)	Pascale Schnider (SUI)
Round 3 Beijing	no women's individual pursuit in this round		
Round 4 Manchester	no women's individual pursuit in this round		

=== 2011–2012 ===
Event	Gold	Silver	Bronze
Round 1 Astana	no women's individual pursuit in this round		
Round 2 Cali	Alison Shanks (NZL)	Wendy Houvenaghel (GBR)	Lesya Kalytovska (UKR)
Round 3 Beijing	no women's individual pursuit in this round		
Round 4 London	Joanna Rowsell (GBR)	Alison Shanks (NZL)	Amy Cure (AUS)

=== 2012–2013 ===
Event	Gold	Silver	Bronze
Round 1 Cali	no women's individual pursuit in this round		
Round 2 Glasgow	no women's individual pursuit in this round		
Round 3 Aguascalientes details (PDF)	Katarzyna Pawłowska (POL)	María Luisa Calle Williams (COL)	Rebecca Wiasak (AUS)

=== 2013–2014 ===
Event	Gold	Silver	Bronze
Round 1 Manchester Details (PDF)	Joanna Rowsell (GBR)	Rebecca Wiasak (AUS)	Katie Archibald (GBR) (Scottish Cycling Braveheart.com)
Round 2 Aguascalientes Details (PDF)	Rebecca Wiasak (AUS)	Elinor Barker (GBR)	Caroline Ryan (IRL)
Round 3 Guadalajara	no women's individual pursuit in this round		

== See also ==
- UCI Track Cycling World Cup – Women's team pursuit
- UCI Track Cycling World Cup – Women's points race
- UCI Track Cycling World Championships – Women's individual pursuit
