= Cycling at the 2000 Summer Olympics – Women's individual pursuit =

Cycling at the Olympics

These are the official results of the Women's Individual Pursuit at the 2000 Summer Olympics in Sydney, Australia. The races were held on Sunday, 17 September, and Monday, 18 September 2000 at the Dunc Gray Velodromewith a race distance of 3 km.

== Medalists ==
Gold:	Silver:	Bronze:
Leontien Zijlaard, Netherlands	Marion Clignet, France	Yvonne McGregor, Great Britain

== Records ==
World and Olympic records prior to the Games
World Record	3:30.9744	Marion Clignet	FRA	Manchester, Great Britain	31 August 1996
Olympic Record	3:32.371	Antonella Bellutti	ITA	Atlanta, United States	26 July 1996

=== Qualifying round ===
17 September

The twelve riders raced against each other in matches of two. Qualification for the next round was not based on who won those matches, however. The cyclists with the four fastest times advanced, regardless of whether they won or lost their match.

Rank	Name	Nation	Time
1	Leontien Zijlaard	Netherlands	3:31.570
2	Marion Clignet	France	3:34.636
3	Yvonne McGregor	Great Britain	3:35.492
4	Sarah Ulmer	New Zealand	3:36.764
5	Antonella Bellutti	Italy	3:36.967
6	Judith Arndt	Germany	3:37.609
7	Alayna Burns	Australia	3:38.223
8	Erin Mirabella	United States	3:38.431
9	Natalia Karimova	Russia	3:41.627
10	Lada Kozlíková	Czech Republic	3:43.019
11	Rasa Mažeikytė	Lithuania	3:43.980
12	María Luisa Calle	Colombia	3:44.395

=== Semi-finals ===
Held 17 September

In the first round of actual match competition, cyclists were seeded into matches based on their times from the qualifying round. The fastest cyclist faced the fourth-fastest and the second-fastest faced the third. Winners advanced to the finals while losers met in the bronze-medal match.

Heat 1

Marion Clignet	France	3:36.244	(2nd)
Yvonne McGregor	Great Britain	3:38.409	(3rd)

Heat 2

Leontien Zijlaard	Netherlands	3:30.816	(1st)
Sarah Ulmer	New Zealand	Overtaken	(4th)

=== Finals ===
Held 18 September

Gold Medal

Leontien Zijlaard	Netherlands	3:33.360
Marion Clignet	France	3:38.751

Bronze Medal

Yvonne McGregor	Great Britain	3:38.850
Sarah Ulmer	New Zealand	3:38.930
