= Michael Sandstød =

Danish cyclist (born 1968)

Personal information
- Full name: Michael Sandstød
- Born: 23 June 1968 (age 58) Copenhagen, Denmark
- Height: 1.80 m (5 ft 11 in)
- Weight: 74 kg (163 lb; 11.7 st)

Cycling career
- Sport: Cycling
- Current team: Retired
- Disciplines: Road and track
- Role: Rider

Professional teams
- 1993–1994: Gitter Mand
- 1995: Marin – Manitou
- 1998: Chicky World
- 1999–2004: home–Jack & Jones
Medal record
Representing Denmark
Men's track cycling
Olympic Games
Bronze medal – third place	1992 Barcelona	Team pursuit
World Championships
Silver medal – second place	1996 Manchester	Points race

Michael Sandstød (born 23 June 1968) is a Danish former professional racing cyclist, who achieved success on both the road and track. Sandstød represented Denmark at the 1992 Summer Olympics, where he rode in the qualification round of the team pursuit where he won a bronze medal.

== Palmarès ==
=== Track cycling ===
Date	Placing	Event	Competition	Location	Country
31 July 1992	3rd place, bronze medalist(s)	Team pursuit (Note: Sandstød rode the qualification round only and was replaced by Klaus Nielsen in the following rounds. The other riders on the squad were Jan Petersen, Ken Frost and Jimmi Madsen)	Summer Olympics	Barcelona	Spain
1996	3		Six Days of Grenoble (Note: The other rider on the team was Jakob Piil.)	Grenoble	France
31 August 1996	2nd place, silver medalist(s)	Points race	World Championships	Manchester	United Kingdom
30 October 1996	3		Six Days of Herning (Note: The other rider on the team was Danny Clark.)	Herning	Denmark
30 May 1997	3	Points race	World Cup	Trexlertown	United States
July 1997	1	Points race	World Cup	Athens	Greece
July 1997	2	Team pursuit (Note: The other riders on the squad were Frederik Bertelsen, Tayeb Braikia and Jacob Piil)	World Cup	Athens	Greece
July 1997	3	Individual pursuit	World Cup	Athens	Greece
28 May 1998	2	Individual pursuit	World Cup	Victoria	Canada
29 May 1998	3	Team pursuit (Note: The other riders on the squad were Tayeb Braikia, Jimmi Madsen and Jakob Piil)	World Cup	Victoria	Canada
12 June 1998	1	Points race	World Cup	Berlin	Germany
19 June 1998	1	Points race	World Cup	Hyères	France
1999	2		Six Days of Grenoble (Note: The other rider on the team was Jakob Piil.)	Grenoble	France
6 February 2002	2		Six Days of Copenhagen (Note: The other rider on the team was Jimmi Madsen.)	Copenhagen	Denmark

=== Road ===
Date	Placing		Race	Location	Country
7 August 1996	1	Stage 1	Danmark Rundt	Aalborg	Denmark
29 June 1997	1	Individual time trial	National championships	Køge	Denmark
5 July 1998	3	Road race	National championships	Lemvig	Denmark
5 July 1998	1	Individual time trial	National championships	Lemvig	Denmark
8 August 1998	8	Individual time trial	World Championships	Maastricht	Netherlands
7 May 1999	1	Stage 5	Four Days of Dunkirk	Marchiennes	France
9 May 1999	1	General classification	Four Days of Dunkirk	Nord-Pas de Calais	France
15 May 1999	1		GP Herning	Herning	Denmark
27 June 1999	1	Individual time trial	National championships	Ringsted	Denmark
2000	1	Individual time trial	National championships		Denmark
13 May 2000	1	Stage 2	Tour de Picardie	Soissons	France
14 May 2000	1	Stage 3b	Tour de Picardie	Nogent-sur-Oise	France
14 May 2000	1	General classification	Tour de Picardie	Picardy	France
19 May 2000	1		GP Herning	Herning	Denmark
17 May 2002	1	Stage 1	Tour de Picardie	Saint-Quentin	France
19 May 2002	1	General classification	Tour de Picardie	Picardy	France
28 June 2002	1	Individual time trial	National championships	Lemvig	Denmark
30 June 2002	1	Road race	National championships	Lemvig	Denmark
25 June 2004	1	Individual time trial	National championships	Hadsten	Denmark
