= Cycling at the 1996 Summer Olympics – Women's pursuit =

Cycling at the Olympics

Women's individual pursuit at the Games of the XXVI Olympiad
- Venue: Stone Mountain Park Velodrome
- Date: 25 July 1996 (qualifying round & quarterfinals); 27 July 1996 (semifinals); 28 July 1996 (final)
- Competitors: 12 from 12 nations

Medalists
1st place, gold medalist(s)		Antonella Bellutti	Italy
2nd place, silver medalist(s)		Marion Clignet	France
3rd place, bronze medalist(s)		Judith Arndt	Germany

These are the official results of the Women's Individual Pursuit at the 1996 Summer Olympics in Atlanta, United States.

== Medalists ==
Gold:	Silver:	Bronze:
Antonella Bellutti Italy	Marion Clignet France	Judith Arndt Germany

== Results ==
=== Qualifying round ===
Rank	Cyclist	NOC	Time	Notes
1	Antonella Bellutti	Italy	3:34.130	Q
2	Marion Clignet	France	3:35.774	Q
3	Yvonne McGregor	Great Britain	3:39.545	Q
4	Rebecca Twigg	United States	3:39.849	Q
5	Judith Arndt	Germany	3:40.335	Q
6	Sarah Ulmer	New Zealand	3:43.176	Q
7	Rasa Mažeikytė	Lithuania	3:43.590	Q
8	Kathy Watt	Australia	3:43.658	Q
9	May Britt Hartwell	Norway	3:43.824	
10	Natalia Karimova	Russia	3:45.246	
11	Wang Qingzhi	China	3:49.823	
12	Seiko Hashimoto	Japan	3:52.745	

=== Quarter-finals ===
Heat	Rank	Cyclist	NOC	Time
1	1	Judith Arndt	Germany	3:38.898
1	2	Rebecca Twigg	United States	3:41.611
2	1	Yvonne McGregor	Great Britain	3:41.287
2	2	Sarah Ulmer	New Zealand	3:45.761
3	1	Marion Clignet	France	3:36.446
3	2	Rasa Mažeikytė	Lithuania	3:42.129
4	1	Antonella Bellutti	Italy	3:32.371
4	2	Kathy Watt	Australia	overtaken

=== Semi-finals ===
Heat	Rank	Cyclist	NOC	Time
1	1	Marion Clignet	France	3:35.412
1	2	Judith Arndt	Germany	3:38.744
2	1	Antonella Bellutti	Italy	3:34.404
2	2	Yvonne McGregor	Great Britain	3:40.885

=== Final ===
Rank	Cyclist	NOC	Time
1	Antonella Bellutti	Italy	3:33.595
2	Marion Clignet	France	3:38.571
