= Sarah Ulmer =

New Zealand cyclist

Sarah Ulmer ONZM
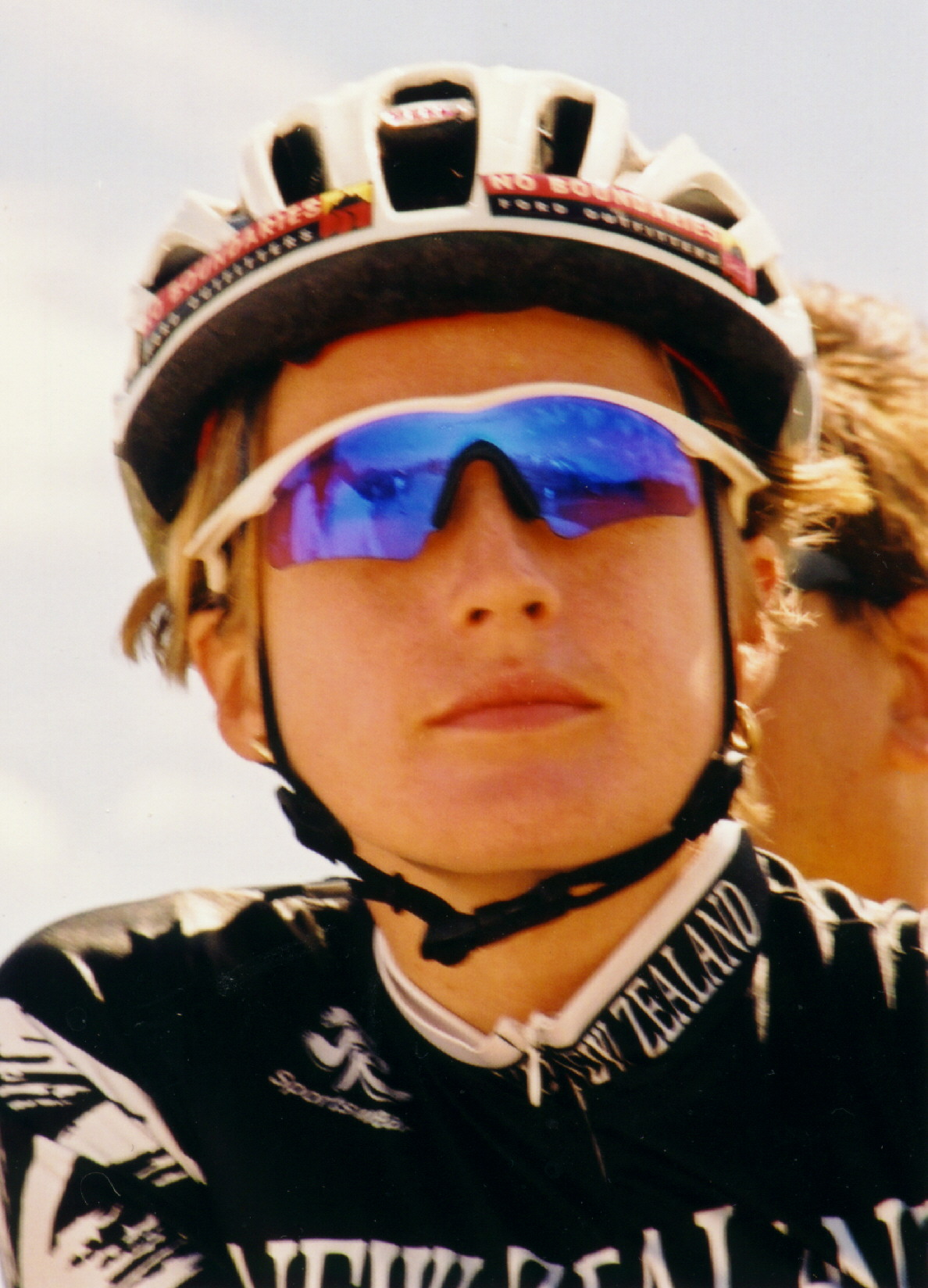
- Ulmer at the 2002 Women's Challenge

Personal information
- Full name: Sarah Elizabeth Ulmer
- Born: 14 March 1976 (age 50) Auckland, New Zealand
- Height: 167 cm (5 ft 5 1/2 in)
- Weight: 64 kg (141 lb; 10.1 st)

Cycling career
- Sport: Cycling
- Disciplines: Road and track
- Role: Rider
- Rider type: Pursuiter / points race / time-trialist / road racer
Medal record
Representing New Zealand
Women's track cycling
Olympic Games
Gold medal – first place	2004 Athens	Individual Pursuit
Commonwealth Games
Gold medal – first place	2002 Manchester	Individual Pursuit
Gold medal – first place	1998 Kuala Lumpur	Individual Pursuit
Silver medal – second place	1998 Kuala Lumpur	Points Race
Silver medal – second place	1994 Victoria	Individual Pursuit
World Championships
Gold medal – first place	2004	Individual Pursuit
Bronze medal – third place	1999	Points Race

Sarah Elizabeth Ulmer ONZM (born 14 March 1976) is a New Zealand former competitive cyclist. She is the first New Zealander to win an Olympic cycling gold medal, which she won in the 3km individual pursuit at the 2004 Athens Olympics setting a world record.

After the 2004 Olympics, she held the Olympic, Commonwealth and World Championship Pursuit titles, and the records for those events.

== Biography ==
Ulmer was born in Auckland, where she studied at the Diocesan School for Girls. Her grandfather Ron Ulmer was a track cyclist for New Zealand at the 1938 British Empire Games. Her father Gary was a national road and track champion.

=== Individual pursuit races ===
In 1994, she won the World Junior Championship and placed second at the 1994 Commonwealth Games in Canada with a time of 3 minutes 51 seconds.

At the 1996 Atlanta Olympics, she was seventh after qualifying 6th with 3m 43s.

At the 1998 Commonwealth Games in Kuala Lumpur, she won the gold medal with 3m 41.7s.

At the 2000 Sydney Olympics, she qualified 4th with 3m 36.8s and came 4th after losing the ride off for third by 0.08 of a second.

At the 2002 Manchester Commonwealth Games, she won the gold and set a games record of 3m 32.4s.

In May 2004, she won the World Championship in Melbourne and set a world record of 3m 30.6s in qualifying. At the Athens 2004 Olympics she broke the world record in qualifying with 3m 26.4s and took almost two seconds off that time to win the gold in the final with 3m 24.5s. Ulmer reduced the world record by six seconds. The silver and bronze medalists, Katie Mactier from Australia and Leontien Ziljaard-van Moorsel from the Netherlands, also went under the previous world record (3m 30.6s) in each of their three rides. They rode faster with each ride and rode 3m 27.6s and 3m 27.0s respectively in the finals.

In May 2010 at Aguascalientes, Mexico at an altitude of 1,870 metres (6,140 ft), American Sarah Hammer broke Ulmer's world record with a time of 3m 22.269s. As of September 2014 nine current world cycling records for distances of 4 km or less have been set at Aguascalientes.

The current world championship record of 3m 27.268s was set by fellow New Zealander, Alison Shanks in Melbourne in 2012.

=== Other races ===
Ulmer did well in points races, winning a junior world championship and placing 3rd and 4th at senior world championships. She placed 2nd and 5th (twice) at Commonwealth Games.

After the 2004 Olympics she switched to road racing. The Cycling Archives website includes results for her competing in road races in the US, France, Australia, Belgium and Germany from 1999 to 2006.

=== Other information ===
Ulmer trained at the velodrome in Te Awamutu. Her home town is Cambridge. Ulmer has two daughters.

In the 2005 New Year Honours, Ulmer was made an Officer of the New Zealand Order of Merit, for services to cycling.

Ulmer announced her retirement from cycling on 24 November 2007. She attended the 2008 Olympics as a mentor.

In 2011, Ulmer signed up as an 'ambassador' for the New Zealand Cycle Trail.

== Palmarès ==
Source: All pursuits are 3 km individual, apart from two 2 km junior pursuits.

1993
2nd Pursuit World Junior Championships (2km)

1994
1st Pursuit World Junior Championships (2km)
1st Points Race World Junior Championships
2nd Pursuit Commonwealth Games
5th Points Race Commonwealth Games

1995
1st Pursuit, National Championships
2nd Points Race, National Championships
3rd Sprint, National Championships
2nd Pursuit, Australia National Championships
1st Pursuit, Adelaide World Cup
3rd Points Race, Adelaide World Cup
1st Pursuit, Quito World Cup
1st Pursuit, Tokyo World Cup

1996
1st Pursuit, National Championships
2nd Points Race, National Championships
7th Pursuit Atlanta Olympics

1998
1st Pursuit Commonwealth Games
2nd Points Race Commonwealth Games
2nd Pursuit, National Championships
1st Points Race, National Championships

1999
3rd Points Race World Championships
6th Pursuit, World Championships
2nd Pursuit, Texas World Cup
2nd Pursuit, Cali World Cup

2000
4th Pursuit Sydney Olympics
8th Points Race Sydney Olympics
1st Pursuit, Cali World Cup
2nd Pursuit, Turin World Cup

2001
1st Pursuit, Mexico City World Cup
1st National Criterium Championships
1st Stage 8 Tour de l'Aude Cycliste Féminin
1st Stage 8 Tour de Snowy

2002
1st Pursuit National Championships
1st Points Race National Championships
1st National Criterium Championships
1st Pursuit, Sydney World Cup
1st Scratch Race, Sydney World Cup
3rd Points Race, Sydney World Cup
1st Pursuit Commonwealth Games
5th Points Race Commonwealth Games

2003
4th Pursuit World Championships
1st Pursuit, Mexico World Cup
1st Pursuit, Sydney World Cup
3rd Points Race, Sydney World Cup
3rd Scratch Race, Sydney World Cup
1st Pursuit, National Championships
1st Points Race, National Championships
3rd 500m Time Trial, National Championships

2004
1st Pursuit World Championships
4th Points Race World Championships
1st Pursuit, Mexico World Cup
3rd Scratch Race, Mexico World Cup
1st Pursuit, Sydney World Cup
1st Stage 4 Geelong Tour
3rd Points Race, Sydney World Cup
1st Pursuit Olympic Games
6th Points Race Olympic Games

2005
1st National Road Race Championships
1st National Time Trial Championships
1st Road Race Oceania Games
1st Time Trial Oceania Games

2006
1st Overall Tour of New Zealand

1st Stage 1 & 4

1st World Cup Road Race Wellington
6th Overall Geelong Tour

2007
3rd National Road Race Championships

== Photo gallery ==
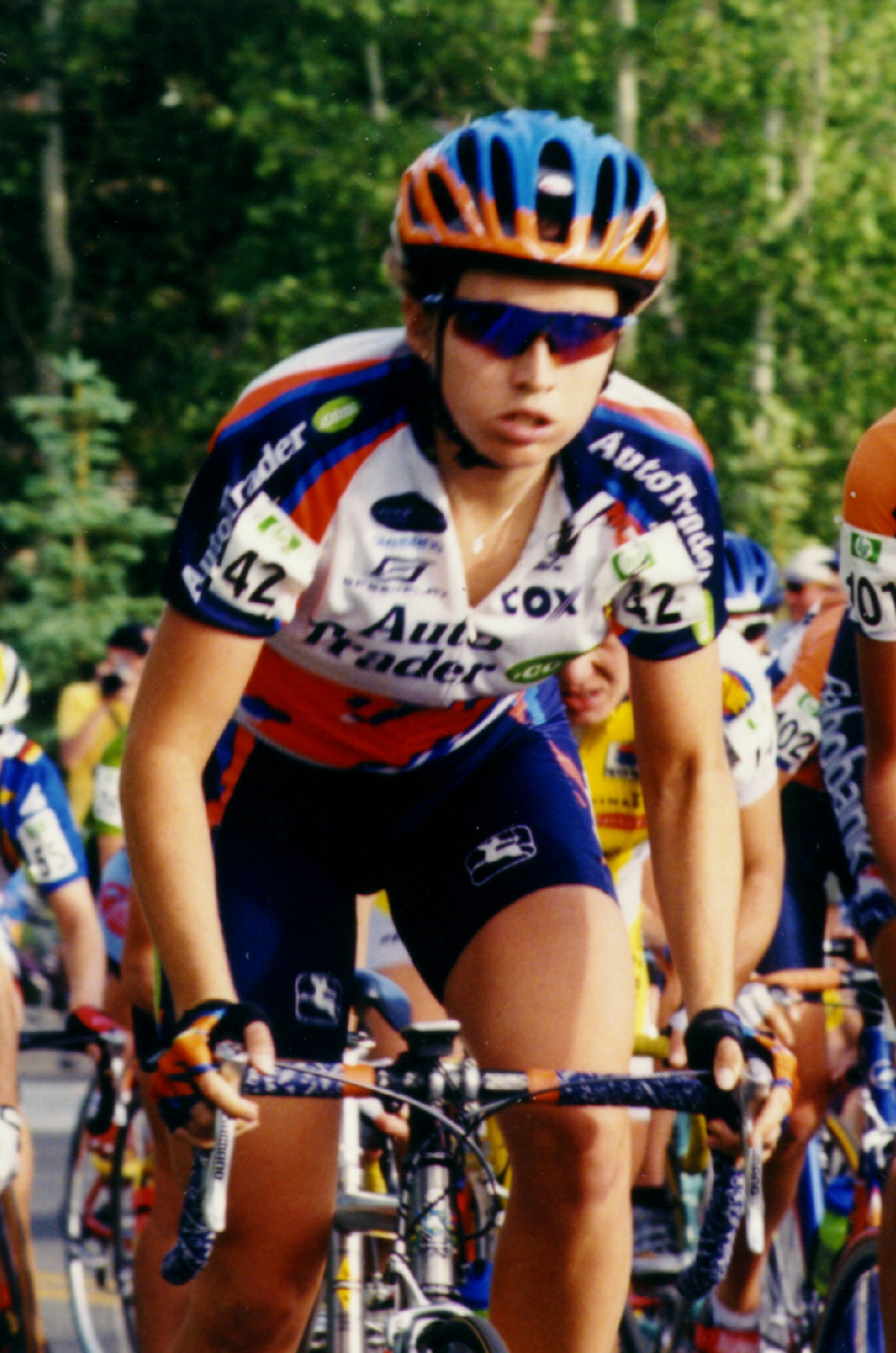
2001 Women's Challenge circuit race

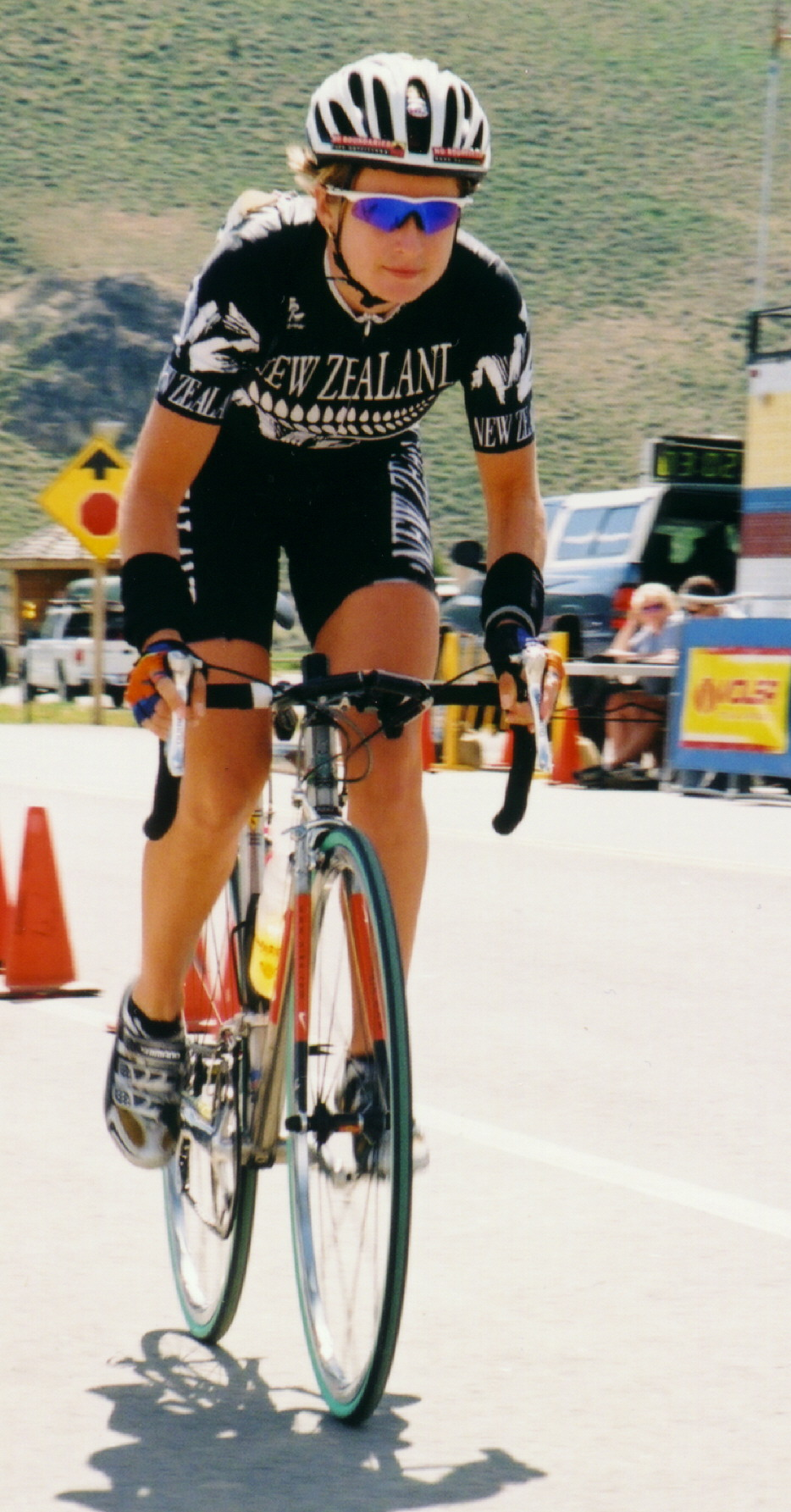
2002 Women's Challenge – time trial

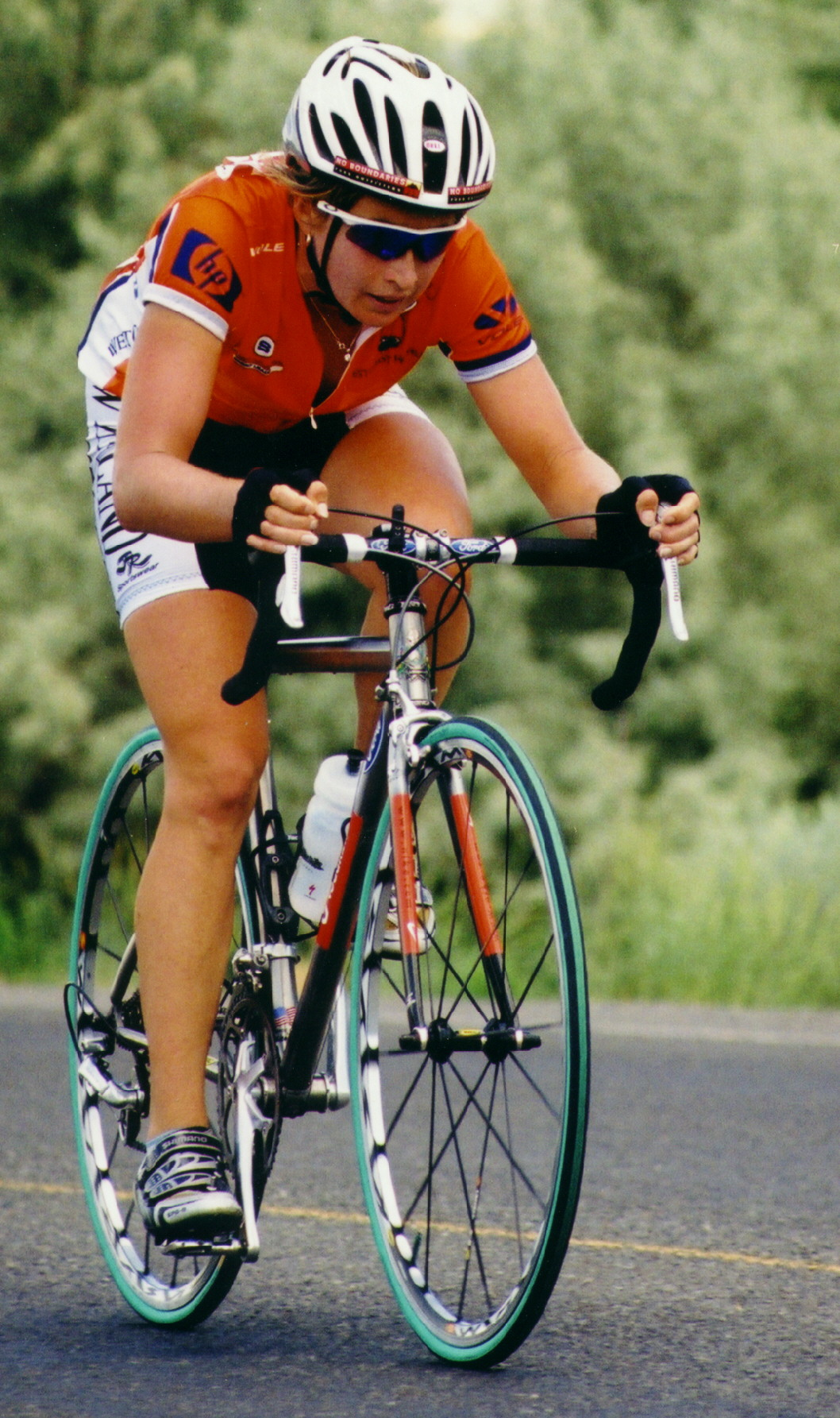
2002 Women's Challenge – stage 7

Awards
Preceded by Susan Devoy	New Zealand's Sportswoman of the Year; 1994; 2004	Succeeded by Marnie McGuire
Preceded by Irene van Dyk	New Zealand's Sportswoman of the Year; 1994; 2004	Succeeded by Kate McIlroy
Preceded by Silver Ferns	Halberg Awards – Supreme Award; 2004	Succeeded by Michael Campbell
Preceded by Blyth Tait	Lonsdale Cup of the New Zealand Olympic Committee; 2002; 2004	Succeeded by Caroline and Georgina Evers-Swindell
Preceded by Caroline and Georgina Evers-Swindell	Lonsdale Cup of the New Zealand Olympic Committee; 2002; 2004	Succeeded by 1982 rowing eight
