= 2007–08 UCI Track Cycling World Cup Classics =

International track cycling competition

2007–2008 UCI Track Cycling World Cup Classics
- Sixteenth edition of the UCI Track Cycling World Cup Classics

Details
- Dates: 30 November 2007 – 17 February 2008
- Location: Australia, China, United States and Denmark
- Races: 4

The 2007–2008 UCI Track Cycling World Cup Classics was a multi race competition over a season of track cycling. The season began on 30 November 2007 and ended on 17 February 2008. The World Cup is organised by the UCI. The 2007–2008 series carried vital ranking points towards the 2008 Beijing Olympics. The following tables contain only Olympic events, although many non-Olympic events are still held.

== Calendar ==
=== Men ===
Event	Winner	Second	Third
Australia, Sydney — November 30–December 2, 2007
1 km time trial	Michaël D'Almeida (FRA)	Hao Li Wen (CHN)	Yevgen Bolibrukh (UKR)
keirin	Chris Hoy (GBR)	Ross Edgar (GBR) (ScienceinSport.com)	Theo Bos (NED)
individual pursuit	Volodymyr Dyudya (UKR)	Phillip Thuaux (AUS) (Drapac–Porsche Development Program)	Alexander Serov (RUS)
team pursuit	Great Britain; Ed Clancy; Steve Cummings; Chris Newton; Bradley Wiggins	New Zealand; Sam Bewley; Westley Gough; Marc Ryan; Jesse Sergent	Southaustralia.com–AIS; Jack Bobridge; Peter Dawson; Zakkari Dempster; Mark Jamieson
sprint	Mickaël Bourgain (FRA) (Cofidis)	Kévin Sireau (FRA) (Cofidis)	Chris Hoy (GBR)
team sprint	Southaustralia.com–AIS; Ryan Bayley; Dan Ellis; Shane Kelly	www.rad-net.de Robert Förstemann; Matthias John; Stefan Nimke	Cofidis; Didier Henriette; Kévin Sireau; Arnaud Tournant
scratch race	Roger Kluge (GER) (Team Focus)	Zachary Bell (CAN)	Milan Kadlec (CZE) (ASC Dukla Praha)
points race	Greg Henderson (NZL)	Toni Tauler (ESP) (Illes Balears)	Cameron Meyer (AUS) (Southaustralia.com–AIS)
madison	Netherlands; Peter Schep; Jens Mouris	Spain; Joan Llaneras; Carlos Torrent	Denmark; Michael Mørkøv; Alex Rasmussen
China, Beijing — December 7–9, 2007
1 km time trial	François Pervis (FRA)	Yevgen Bolibrukh (UKR)	Hao Li Wen (CHN)
keirin	Chris Hoy (GBR)	Arnaud Tournant (FRA)	Teun Mulder (NED)
individual pursuit	Bradley Wiggins (GBR) (T-Mobile Track Team)	Volodymyr Dyudya (UKR)	Alexander Serov (RUS)
team pursuit	Great Britain; Ed Clancy; Steve Cummings; Geraint Thomas; Paul Manning	New Zealand; Sam Bewley; Westley Gough; Timothy Gudsell; Marc Ryan	Netherlands; Levi Heimans; Jenning Huizenga; Jens Mouris; Peter Schep
sprint	Theo Bos (NED)	Mickaël Bourgain (FRA) (Cofidis)	Stefan Nimke (GER) (www.rad-net.de)
team sprint	Netherlands; Theo Bos; Teun Mulder; Tim Veldt	France; Grégory Baugé; François Pervis; Arnaud Tournant	Great Britain; Chris Hoy; Craig MacLean; Jason Queally
scratch race	Mike Friedman (USA)	Walter Pérez (ARG)	Tim Mertens (BEL)
points race	Joan Llaneras (ESP)	Chris Newton (GBR) (Recycling.co.uk)	Cameron Meyer (AUS) (Southaustralia.com–AIS)
madison	France; Jérôme Neuville; Christophe Riblon	T-Mobile Track Team; Mark Cavendish; Bradley Wiggins	Ukraine; Lyubomyr Polatayko; Volodymyr Rybin
United States, Los Angeles — January 18–20, 2008
1 km time trial	Scott Sunderland (AUS) (Southaustralia.com–AIS)	Yevgen Bolibrukh (UKR)	Hao Li Wen (CHN)
keirin	Arnaud Tournant (FRA) (Cofidis)	Christos Volikakis (GRE)	Ryan Bayley (AUS) (Southaustralia.com–AIS)
individual pursuit	Taylor Phinney (USA) (Slipstream–Chipotle)	Jenning Huizenga (NED)	Sergi Escobar (ESP)
team pursuit	Australia; Jack Bobridge; Peter Dawson; Mark Jamieson; Bradley McGee	Denmark; Casper Jørgensen; Jens-Erik Madsen; Michael Mørkøv; Alex Rasmussen	Ukraine; Lyubomyr Polatayko; Maxim Polischuk; Vitaliy Popkov; Vitaliy Shchedov
sprint	Roberto Chiappa (ITA)	Kévin Sireau (FRA) (Cofidis)	Teun Mulder (NED)
team sprint	Cofidis; Didier Henriette; Kévin Sireau; Arnaud Tournant	France; Grégory Baugé; Mickaël Bourgain; François Pervis	Australia; Mark French; Ben Kersten; Jason Niblett
scratch race	Wong Kam-po (HKG)	Vasil Kiryienka (BLR)	Wim Stroetinga (NED)
points race	Cameron Meyer (AUS)	Rafał Ratajczyk (POL)	Chris Newton (GBR) (Recycling.co.uk)
madison	Belgium; Kenny De Ketele; Tim Mertens	Denmark; Michael Mørkøv; Alex Rasmussen	Germany; Roger Kluge; Olaf Pollack
Denmark, Copenhagen — February 15–17, 2008
1 km time trial	François Pervis (FRA)	Yevgen Bolibrukh (UKR)	Hao Li Wen (CHN)
keirin	Chris Hoy (GBR)	Ricardo Lynch (JAM)	Arnaud Tournant (FRA) (Cofidis)
individual pursuit	Sergi Escobar (ESP)	Alexei Markov (RUS)	Luke Roberts (AUS)
team pursuit	Great Britain; Steven Burke; Ed Clancy; Geraint Thomas; Paul Manning	Denmark; Casper Jørgensen; Jens-Erik Madsen; Michael Mørkøv; Alex Rasmussen	Australia; Matthew Goss; Cameron Meyer; Travis Meyer; Luke Roberts
sprint	Kévin Sireau (FRA)	Chris Hoy (GBR)	Andriy Vynokurov (UKR)
team sprint	France; Grégory Baugé; François Pervis; Kévin Sireau	Netherlands; Theo Bos; Teun Mulder; Tim Veldt	Cofidis; Mickaël Bourgain; Didier Henriette; Arnaud Tournant
scratch race	Wim Stroetinga (NED)	Andreas Müller (AUT)	Juan Esteban Arango (COL)
points race	Pim Ligthart (NED) (Team DSB Bank)	Rafał Ratajczyk (POL)	Chris Newton (GBR)
madison	Denmark; Michael Mørkøv; Alex Rasmussen	United States; Bobby Lea; Colby Pearce	Netherlands; Peter Schep; Wim Stroetinga

=== Women ===
Event	Winner	Second	Third
Australia, Sydney — November 30–December 2, 2007
500m time trial	Anna Meares (AUS) (Southaustralia.com–AIS)	Lisandra Guerra (CUB)	Willy Kanis (NED)
keirin	Victoria Pendleton (GBR) (ScienceinSport.com)	Jennie Reed (USA) (Momentum Cycling)	Natallia Tsylinskaya (BLR)
individual pursuit	Katie Mactier (AUS)	Vilija Sereikaitė (LTU) (Safi–Pasta Zara–Manhattan)	Karin Thürig (SUI)
team pursuit	Russia; Evgenia Romanyuta; Olga Slyusareva; Anastasia Chulkova	Australia; Belinda Goss; Katie Mactier; Josephine Tomic	Ukraine; Svitlana Halyuk; Lesya Kalytovska; Lyubov Shulika
sprint	Willy Kanis (NED)	Anna Meares (AUS) (Southaustralia.com–AIS)	Natallia Tsylinskaya (BLR)
team sprint	Netherlands; Yvonne Hijgenaar; Willy Kanis	Australia; Kaarle McCulloch; Kerrie Meares	France; Sandie Clair; Virginie Cueff
scratch race	Yumari González (CUB)	Annalisa Cucinotta (ITA)	Anastasia Chulkova (RUS)
points race	Giorgia Bronzini (ITA) (Safi–Pasta Zara–Manhattan)	Li Yan (CHN)	Jarmila Machačová (CZE)
China, Beijing — December 7–9, 2007
500m time trial	Lisandra Guerra (CUB)	Simona Krupeckaitė (LTU)	Natallia Tsylinskaya (BLR)
keirin	Willy Kanis (NED)	Christin Muche (GER)	Natallia Tsylinskaya (BLR)
individual pursuit	Katie Mactier (AUS)	Rebecca Romero (GBR)	Sarah Hammer (USA)
team pursuit	Ukraine; Svitlana Halyuk; Lesya Kalytovska; Lyubov Shulika	Russia; Evgenia Romanyuta; Olga Slyusareva; Anastasia Chulkova	Cuba; Yudelmis Domínguez; Yoanka González; Yumari González
sprint	Natallia Tsylinskaya (BLR)	Victoria Pendleton (GBR) (ScienceinSport.com)	Clara Sanchez (FRA)
team sprint	Netherlands; Yvonne Hijgenaar; Willy Kanis	France; Sandie Clair; Clara Sanchez	China; Guo Shuang; Zheng Lulu
scratch race	Marianne Vos (NED) (Team DSB Bank)	Belinda Goss (AUS)	Yumari González (CUB)
points race	Marianne Vos (NED) (Team DSB Bank)	Yoanka González (CUB)	Katherine Bates (AUS) (T-Mobile Track Team)
United States, Los Angeles — January 18–20, 2008
500 m time trial	Lisandra Guerra (CUB)	Willy Kanis (NED)	Simona Krupeckaitė (LTU)
keirin	Jennie Reed (USA) (Momentum Cycling)	Willy Kanis (NED)	Gong Jinjie (CHN) (Giant Pro Cycling)
individual pursuit	Lesya Kalytovska (UKR)	María Luisa Calle (COL)	Sarah Hammer (USA) (OUCH Pro Cycling)
team pursuit	Ukraine; Yelyzaveta Bochkaryova; Lesya Kalytovska; Lyubov Shulika	Russia; Anastasia Chulkova; Olga Slyusareva; Elena Tchalykh	United States; Kristin Armstrong; Lauren Franges; Christen King
sprint	Natallia Tsylinskaya (BLR)	Jennie Reed (USA) (Momentum Cycling)	Willy Kanis (NED)
team sprint	Netherlands; Yvonne Hijgenaar; Willy Kanis	France; Sandie Clair; Virginie Cueff	Australia; Kaarle McCulloch; Kerrie Meares
scratch race	Charlotte Becker (GER)	Evgenia Romanyuta (RUS)	Elena Tchalykh (RUS)
points race	Jarmila Machačová (CZE)	Lee Min-Hye (KOR)	Li Yan (CHN)
Denmark, Copenhagen — February 15–17, 2008
500 m time trial	Gong Jinjie (CHN) (Giant Pro Cycling)	Sandie Clair (FRA)	Miriam Welte (GER)
keirin	Willy Kanis (NED)	Jennie Reed (USA)	Dana Glöss (GER) (www.rad-net.de)
individual pursuit	Rebecca Romero (GBR)	Vilija Sereikaitė (LTU) (Safi–Pasta Zara–Manhattan)	Sarah Hammer (USA)
team pursuit	Germany; Elke Gebhardt; Verena Joos; Alexandra Sontheimer	Netherlands; Marlijn Binnendijk; Yvonne Hijgenaar; Ellen van Dijk	Ukraine; Svitlana Halyuk; Lyubov Shulika; Lyudmyla Vypyraylo
sprint	Willy Kanis (NED)	Victoria Pendleton (GBR) (ScienceinSport.com)	Guo Shuang (CHN)
team sprint	ScienceinSport.com; Victoria Pendleton; Shanaze Reade	Netherlands; Yvonne Hijgenaar; Willy Kanis	France; Sandie Clair; Clara Sanchez
scratch race	Marianne Vos (NED) (Team DSB Bank)	Jarmila Machačová (CZE)	Anastasia Chulkova (RUS)
points race	Wong Wan Yiu (HKG)	Trine Schmidt (DEN)	Theresa Cliff-Ryan (USA) (Verducci Breakaway Racing)

== See also ==
- 2007 in track cycling
- 2008 in track cycling
