= Jean-Pierre van Zyl =

South African cyclist (born 1975)

Jean-Pierre Van Zyl
Personal information
- Full name: Jean-Pierre Van Zyl
- Born: 15 August 1975 (age 51) Potchefstroom, South Africa

Cycling career
- Sport: Cycling
- Current team: Retired
- Discipline: Track cycling
- Role: Rider
Medal record
Representing South Africa
Track cycling
World Championships
Silver medal – second place	1997 Perth	Keirin
Bronze medal – third place	2003 Stuttgart	Scratch

Jean-Pierre Van Zyl (born 15 August 1975) is a South African track cyclist. He won medals in the UCI Track Cycling World Championships - a silver medal in keirin in 1997 and a bronze medal in scratch in 2003.

== Career achievements ==
Date	Placing	Event	Competition	Location	Country
May 1997	3	Keirin	World Cup	Cali	Colombia
August 1997	2	Keirin	World Cup	Adelaide	Australia
August 1997	1	Sprint	World Cup	Adelaide	Australia
27 August 1997	2nd place, silver medalist(s)	Keirin	World Championships	Perth	Australia
May 2002	2	Points race	World Cup	Sydney	Australia
2003	2	Six Days of Grenoble	Six Days	Grenoble	France
30 July 2003	3rd place, bronze medalist(s)	Scratch	World Championships	Stuttgart	Germany
April 2003	2	Scratch	World Cup	Cape Town	South Africa
20 January 2004	3	Six Days of Stuttgart	Six Days	Stuttgart	Germany
23 July 2004	1	Three Days of Pordenone	Three Days	Pordenone	Italy
