= Lenka Valová =

Czech cyclist

Personal information
- Born: 18 April 1983 (age 43) Třebíč, Czechoslovakia

Cycling career
- Sport: Cycling

Lenka Valová (born 18 April 1983) is a Czech cyclist. She competed in the women's individual pursuit at the 2004 Summer Olympics.
