= Cinturón a Mallorca =

Road bicycle race in Mallorca, Spain

Race details
- Date: Early-April
- Region: Mallorca, Spain
- Discipline: Road race
- Competition: UCI Europe Tour
- Type: Stage race
- Organiser: Germatur Gestión

History
- First edition: 1964
- Editions: 46
- Final edition: 2011
- First winner: Juan Francisco Granell (ESP)
- Most wins: Frederik Bertelsen (DEN) (2 wins)
- Final winner: Iker Camaño (ESP)

Cinturón a Mallorca was a road bicycle race held annually on the island of Mallorca, Spain. Between 2005 and 2011, it was classified as a 2.2 event on the UCI Europe Tour. The race was not held after 2011 because of financial problems.

== Winners ==
Year	Country	Rider	Team
1964	Spain	Juan Francisco Granell	
1965	Spain	Antonio Cerda	
1966	Spain	José Ramon Goyeneche	
1967	Spain	Manuel Iborra	
1968	Spain	Francisco Galdós	
1969	Spain	Manuel Andrade	
1970	Spain	José Casas	
1971; 1972	No race		
1973	Spain	Manuel Esparza	
1974	Spain	Jésus Lindez	
1975	Spain	Francisco Fernández	
1976	Ireland	Sean Kelly	
1977	Spain	Faustino Rupérez	
1978	Spain	José Antonio Cabrero	
1979	Sweden	Anders Adamsson	
1980	Spain	Angel Camarillo	
1981	Spain	Enrique Aja	
1982	Switzerland	Daniel Heggli	
1983	Switzerland	Peter Wollenmann	
1984	Spain	José Salvador	
1985	Brazil	Mauro Ribero	
1986	Netherlands	Luc Suykerbuyk	
1987	Spain	Augustin Sebastia	
1988	Italy	Luigi Bielli	
1989	Spain	Juan Alberto Reig	
1990	Soviet Union	Evgeny Zagrebelny	
1991	Czechoslovakia	Vladimir Kozarek	
1992	Latvia	Arvis Piziks	
1993	Sweden	Michael Andersson	
1994	Denmark	Frederik Bertelsen	
1995	Denmark	Frederik Bertelsen	
1996	Moldova	Ruslan Ivanov	
1997	Sweden	Martin Rittsel	
1998	Sweden	Henrik Sparr	
1999	Spain	Juan Manuel Fuentes	
2000	Russia	Vladimir Karpets	
2001	Great Britain	Bradley Wiggins	
2002	Spain	Sergi Escobar	Spain (national team)
2003	Germany	Lars Teutenberg	CC Arenal-Emaya
2004	Spain	Alexis Rodriguez	Cropusa
2005	Russia	Dmitry Kozontchuk	Rabobank Continental Team
2006	Russia	Pavel Brutt	Tinkoff Restaurants
2007	Czech Republic	Richard Faltus	Team Sparkasse
2008	Germany	Dirk Müller	Team Sparkasse
2009	Colombia	Sergio Luis Henao	Colombia es Pasión-Coldeportes
2010	Spain	Sergio Mantecón	Hosteleria de Cañete-Nagares
2011	Spain	Iker Camaño	Endura Racing
