= 2002 Paris–Tours =

Race details
- Dates: 6 October 2002
- Stages: 1
- Distance: 257 km (159.7 mi)
- Winning time: 5h 39' 11"

Results
	Winner	Jakob Piil (DEN)	(CSC–Tiscali)
	Second	Jacky Durand (FRA)	(Française des Jeux)
	Third	Erik Zabel (GER)	(Team Telekom)

The 2002 Paris–Tours was the 96th edition of the Paris–Tours cycle race and was held on 6 October 2002. The race started in Saint-Arnoult-en-Yvelines and finished in Tours. The race was won by Jakob Piil of the CSC–Tiscali team.

== General classification ==
Final general classification

Rank	Rider	Team	Time
1	Jakob Piil (DEN)	CSC–Tiscali	5h 39' 11"
2	Jacky Durand (FRA)	Française des Jeux	+ 0"
3	Erik Zabel (GER)	Team Telekom	+ 20"
4	René Haselbacher (AUT)	Gerolsteiner	+ 20"
5	Romāns Vainšteins (LAT)	Domo–Farm Frites	+ 20"
6	José Enrique Gutiérrez (ESP)	Kelme–Costa Blanca	+ 20"
7	Igor Astarloa (ESP)	Saeco–Longoni Sport	+ 20"
8	Jo Planckaert (BEL)	Cofidis	+ 20"
9	Fabio Sacchi (ITA)	Saeco–Longoni Sport	+ 20"
10	Julian Dean (AUS)	U.S. Postal Service	+ 20"
