= Cycling at the 2004 Summer Olympics – Women's individual pursuit =

Cycling at the Olympics

Women's individual pursuit at the Games of the XXVIII Olympiad

Medalists
1st place, gold medalist(s)		Sarah Ulmer	New Zealand
2nd place, silver medalist(s)		Katie Mactier	Australia
3rd place, bronze medalist(s)		Leontien Zijlaard-van Moorsel	Netherlands

The women's Individual Pursuit at the 2004 Summer Olympics (Cycling) was an event that consisted of matches between two cyclists. The riders would start at opposite ends of the track. They had 12 laps (3 kilometres) in which to catch the other cyclist. If neither was caught before one had gone 12 laps, the times for the distance were used to determine the victor. In the twelve matches of the 2004 event, one cyclist was lapped.

== Records ==
World Record	Sarah Ulmer (NZL)	Auckland, New Zealand	3:30.604	27 May 2004
Olympic Record	Leontien Zijlaard (NED)	Sydney, Australia	3:30.816	17 September 2000

Ulmer held the world record coming into this event, which she set at the world championships in Melbourne in May 2004. She reduced the world record by more than 6 seconds during this event. All three of the medallists in Athens beat the previous world record.

WR denotes world record
Q denotes qualification for next round

=== Qualifying round ===
The riders raced against each other in matches of two. Qualification for the next round was not based on who won those matches, however. The cyclists with the eight fastest times advanced, regardless of whether they won or lost their match. This resulted in the first two heats not having any riders advance while the next four heats each had both winners and losers advance.

Time	Place	Rider	Country
Heat 1
3:54.372	11th	Lenka Valova	Czech Republic
3:56.055	12th	Evelyn García	El Salvador
Heat 2
3:35.430	9th	María Luisa Calle	Colombia
3:36.992	10th	Erin Mirabella	United States
Heat 3
3:31.236 Q	4th	Katherine Bates	Australia
3:35.069 Q	7th	Emma Davies	Great Britain

Time	Place	Rider	Country
Heat 4
3:33.709 Q	5th	Elena Chalykh	Russia
3:34.746 Q	6th	Karin Thürig	Switzerland
Heat 5
3:29.945 Q	2nd	Katie Mactier	Australia
3:30.422 Q	3rd	Leontien Zijlaard-van Moorsel	Netherlands
Heat 6
3:26.400 WR Q	1st	Sarah Ulmer	New Zealand
3:35.177 Q	8th	Olga Slyusareva	Russia

=== First round ===
In the first round of actual match competition, cyclists were seeded into matches based on their times from the qualifying round. The fastest cyclist faced the eighth-fastest, the second-fastest faced the third, and so forth. Winners advanced to the finals while losers in each match received a final ranking based on their time in the round.

Time	Place	Rider	Country
Heat 1
3:34.743 Q	4th	Katherine Bates	Australia
3:36.442	7th	Elena Chalykh	Russia
Heat 2
3:28.747 Q	3rd	Leontien Ziljaard-van Moorsel	Netherlands
3:34.831	5th	Karin Thürig	Switzerland
Heat 3
3:28.095 Q	2nd	Katie Mactier	Australia
Overlapped	8th	Emma Davies	Great Britain
Heat 4
3:27.444 Q	1st	Sarah Ulmer	New Zealand
3:36.263	6th	Olga Slyusareva	Russia

=== Finals ===
In the women's individual pursuit finals, the current world champion and world record holder, Sarah Ulmer from New Zealand, set a new world record in the final for a time of 3:24.537 for the gold medal. It is the first time New Zealand has ever won a cycling gold medal. The Australian, Katie Mactier (3:27.650), set a very fast first 1000 m of 1:10.618, with a lead of one second, but Ulmer reversed this lead in the second 1000 m, and went on to win the pursuit by 3 seconds. Netherlands rider and former world champion, Leontien Ziljaard-van Moorsel rode a time of 3:27.037 for the bronze defeating Australian, Katherine Bates (3:31.715)

Gold/Silver medal race
Pos	Rider	Country	Time
1	Sarah Ulmer	New Zealand	3:24.537 WR
2	Katie Mactier	Australia	3:27.650

Bronze medal race
Pos	Rider	Country	Time
1	Leontien Zijlaard-van Moorsel	Netherlands	3:27.037
2	Katherine Bates	Australia	3:31.715

== Final classification ==
Final classification
Pos.	Athlete	NOC
1.	Sarah Ulmer	New Zealand
2.	Katie Mactier	Australia
3.	Leontien Zijlaard-van Moorsel	Netherlands
4.	Katherine Bates	Australia
5.	Karin Theurig	Switzerland
6.	Olga Slyusareva	Russia
7.	Elena Chalykh	Russia
8.	Emma Davies	Great Britain
9.	María Luisa Calle	Colombia
10.	Erin Mirabella	United States
11.	Lenka Valova	Czech Republic
12.	Evelyn García	El Salvador
