= Antonella Bellutti =

Italian cyclist (born 1968)

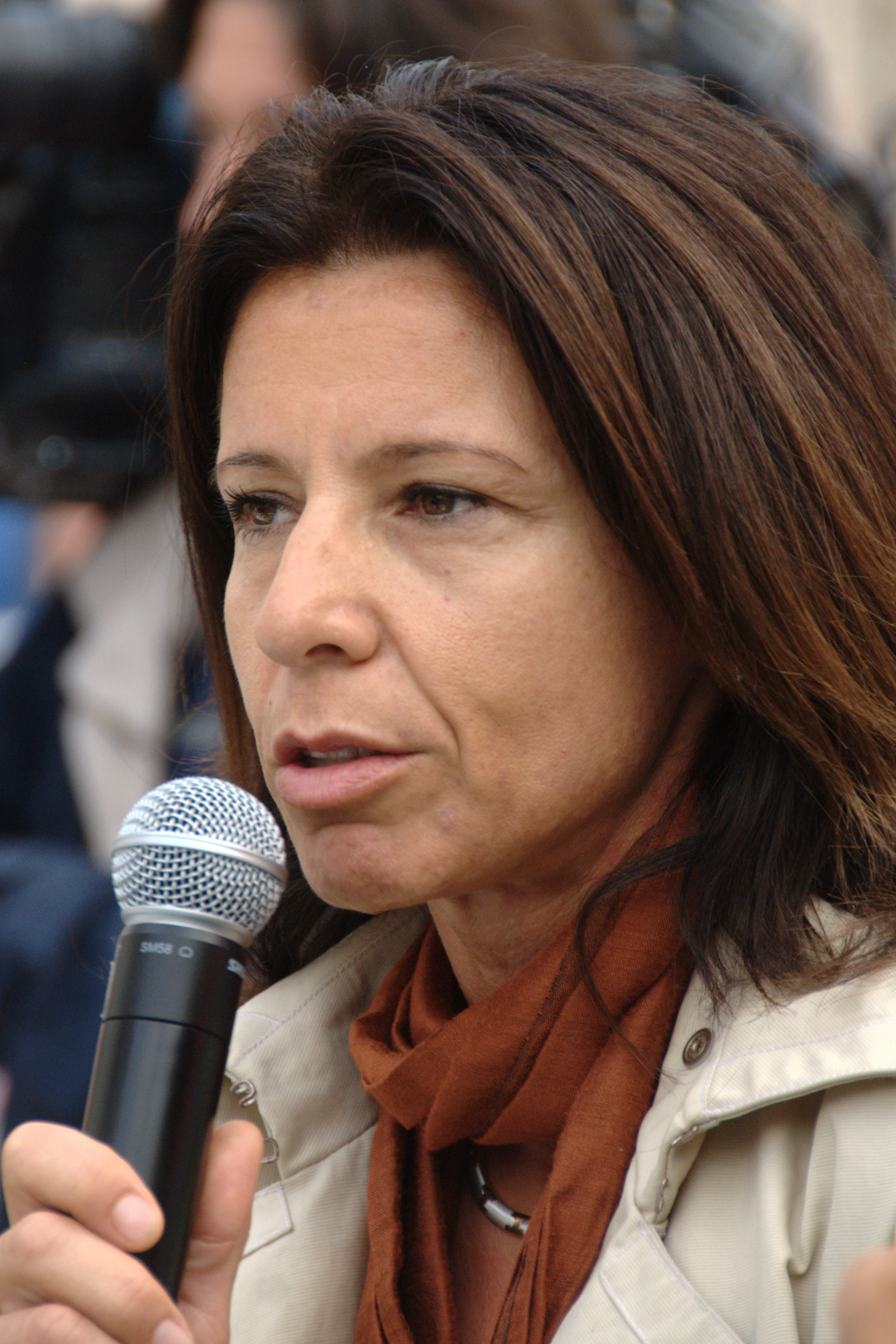
- Bellutti in 2010

Personal information
- Born: 7 November 1968 (age 57) Bolzano, Italy

Cycling career
- Sport: Cycling
- Rider type: track and road
Medal record
Women's track cycling
Representing Italy
Olympic Games
Gold medal – first place	1996 Atlanta	Individual pursuit
Gold medal – first place	2000 Sydney	Points race
World Championships
Silver medal – second place	1995 Bogotá	Pursuit
Bronze medal – third place	1996 Manchester	Pursuit

Antonella Bellutti (born 7 November 1968) is an Italian racing cyclist and two-time Olympic champion in track cycling.

She won the pursuit at the 1996 Summer Olympics in Atlanta and the points race at the 2000 Summer Olympics in Sydney.

== Biography ==
Born in Bolzano, in South Tyrol, she now resides in Rovereto, in Trentino.

Bellutti won the silver medal in pursuit at the 1995 UCI Track Cycling World Championships in Bogotá, Colombia. The following year she won a bronze medal in the same event.

From 1995 to 2000 she competed in UCI Track Cycling World Cup events, achieving top 3 placings in the pursuit, points race and 500m time trial.

She also competed in road races.

She finished seventh at the Winter Olympics of Salt Lake City 2002 in two-women bobsleigh with the former Olympic and world gold medalist luger Gerda Weissensteiner.

== Palmàres ==
1994
1st Pursuit, Italian National Track Championships

1995
1st Pursuit, National Championships
1st 500 m TT, National Championships
2nd Pursuit, Track World Championships
1995 Track World Cup

1st Pursuit, Round 6, Manchester

1996
1st Pursuit, 1996 Summer Olympics
1st Pursuit, National Championships
1st 500 m TT, National Championships
3rd Pursuit, Track World Championships
1996 Track World Cup

1st Pursuit, Round 1, Cali
1st 500m time trial, Round 1, Cali
1st Pursuit, Round 3, Athens

1997
1st Pursuit, National Championships
1st 500 m TT, National Championships
1st Sprint, National Championships
1997 Track World Cup

1st Pursuit, Round 6, Adelaide
1st Pursuit, Round 4, Cagliari
1st Pursuit, Round 3, Fiorenzuola d'Arda
1st Pursuit, Round 1, Cali
1st Points race, Round 1, Cali

1998
1st Pursuit, National Championships
1st 500 m TT, National Championships
1998 Track World Cup

1st Pursuit, Round 1, Cali
1st Points race, Round 1, Cali
1st Points race, Round 2, Victoria

1999
1st 500 m TT, National Championships
1st Points race, National Championships
1999 Track World Cup

1st Points race, Overall Series Winner

2000
1st Points race, 2000 Summer Olympics
1st Pursuit, National Championships
1st 500 m TT, National Championships
1st Points race, National Championships
1st Sprint, National Championships
2000 Track World Cup

1st Points race, Overall Series Winner
1st Pursuit, Overall Series Winner
1st Pursuit, Round 3 Mexico

== See also ==
- List of athletes who competed in both the Summer and Winter Olympic games
- List of multi-sport athletes
- Italian sportswomen multiple medalists at Olympics and World Championships
