= Adam Payne (cyclist) =

Professional cyclist

Personal information
- Full name: Adam Payne
- Born: May 5, 1970 (age 56) Atlanta, Georgia, U.S.
- Height: 1.75 m (5 ft 9 in)
- Weight: 74.8 kg (165 lb)

Cycling career
- Sport: Cycling
- Disciplines: Track & Road
- Role: Rider
- Rider type: Multi Discipline

Professional teams
- 1987–1998: US National Track Team
- 1995–1998: Team UPS/COX - Atlanta Velo

Adam Payne (born November 3, 1970) is an American former professional track cyclist and road bicycle racer. He is a World Cup, Pan American Championships, and Multi National Championship medalist.

== Major achievements ==
World Cup
Silver Medal – Team Pursuit (1997)
Pan American Championships
Bronze Medal - Kilometer (1995)

US National Championships

Gold Medal - Junior Pursuit (1988)

Gold Medal - Masters Team Pursuit (2007)

Silver Medal and Olympic Team Alternate - Elite Team Pursuit (1996)

Silver Medal - Elite Team Pursuit (1997)

Bronze Medal - Junior Points Race (1987)

Bronze Medal - Junior Kilometer (1988)

US Track Cup

Gold Medal - Points Race - EDS Track Cup - Houston TX (1997)

Gold Medal - Team Pursuit - EDS Track Cup - Houston TX (1997) { Gold Medal - Points Race - EDS Track Cup - Carson CA (1998)

Gold Medal - Kilometer - EDS Track Cup - Indianapolis IN (1998)

Gold Medal - Team Pursuit - EDS Track Cup - Trexlertown PA (1998)
