= Jakob Piil =

Danish cyclist

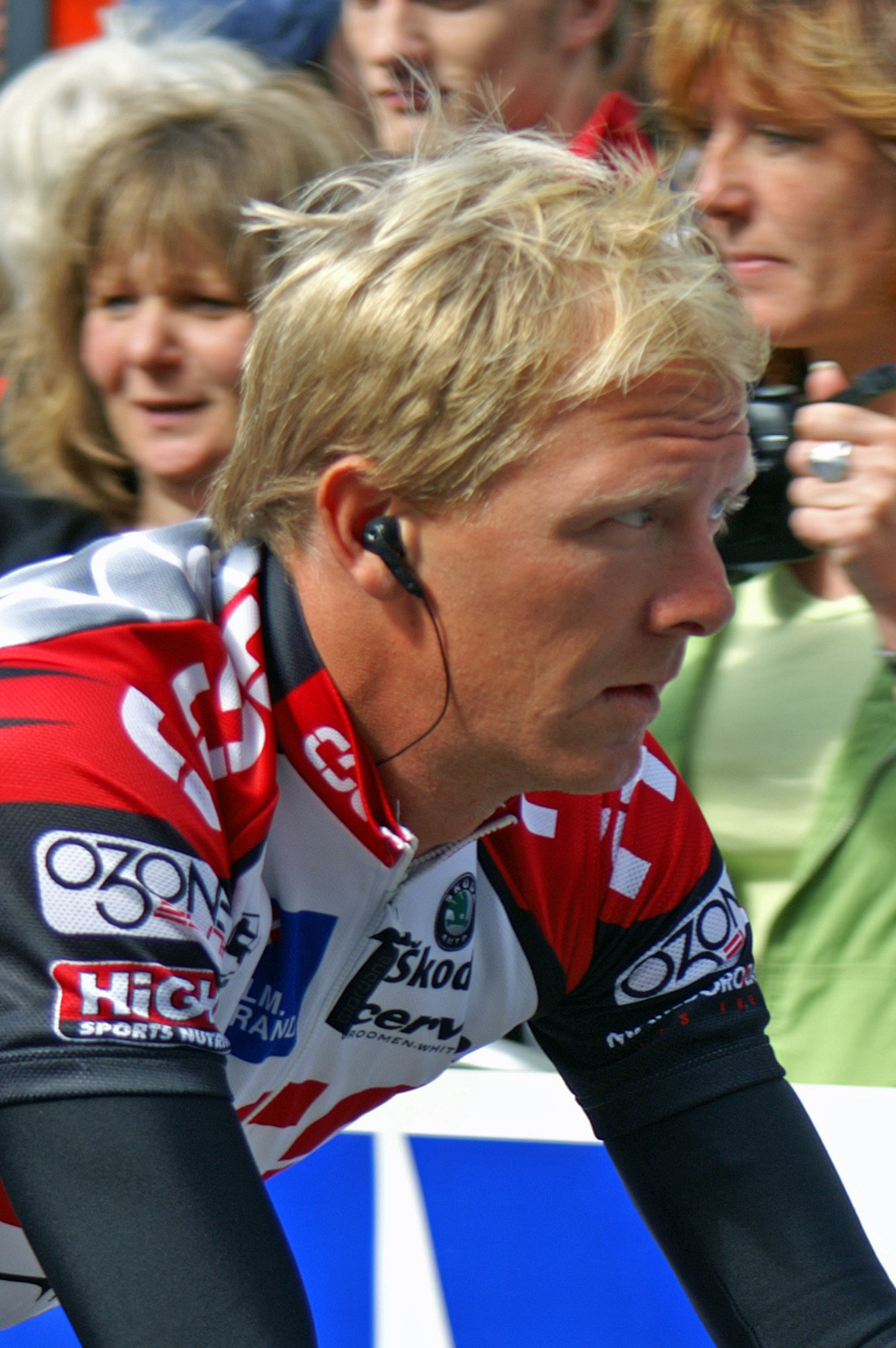
- Piil at the 2005 HEW Cyclassics

Personal information
- Full name: Jakob Storm Piil
- Born: 9 March 1973 (age 53) Virum, Denmark
- Height: 1.82 m (6 ft 0 in)
- Weight: 67 kg (148 lb)

Cycling career
- Sport: Cycling
- Discipline: Road
- Role: Rider
- Rider type: All-rounder

Professional teams
- 1997: RDM
- 1998-1999: Team Acceptcard
- 2000-2006: Team CSC
- 2007: T-Mobile Team

Major wins
- Tour de France, 1 stage; Paris–Tours (2002); Peace Race (2001)

Jakob Storm Piil (born 9 March 1973) is a Danish former professional road bicycle racer, where he later lived many years in Odense. He is an all-round rider, known for his aggressive style of riding, whose speciality is to pick the right breakaways. He competed at the 1996 Summer Olympics and the 2000 Summer Olympics. He is the cousin of Danish former professional bicycle racer Jørgen V. Pedersen.

== Biography ==
Piil was born in Virum, Copenhagen. He started his career as a track racer, riding six-day races with shifting partners, including the Danish riders Michael Sandstød, Tayeb Braikia, and Jimmi Madsen. In 1997 he signed up for the RDM professional cycling team, getting only a handful of top-ten results in his first year as a pro. He moved to Danish Team Acceptcard in 1998, where he got the first, minor, victory of his career at the GP Skive in 1998. 1999 was his professional breakthrough with many good results, and a meriting win of the USPRO Championship. In 2000, he switched to Team CSC, back then known as Team Memory Card – Jack & Jones.

His first year at Team CSC wasn't entirely successful, as a crash into a car just before the Milan–San Remo ruined the first four months of his season, though he still managed a few minor results. 2001 was a better season for Piil, as he won the Peace Race and, perhaps most importantly for his later career, finished a 2nd at stage 17 in the 2001 Tour de France. After a 16-man break-away was established after only five kilometres, Piil was one of three riders in the 16-man group who were able to keep the peloton behind them, but Piil found himself beaten by Serge Baguet at the finish line. In 2002 Piil won Paris–Tours and Danmark Rundt, and once again tried his luck at winning a stage in the 2002 Tour de France. At the 18th stage, Piil was lined up in a favourable position to sprint for the stage win, when his foot jumped out of the toe clip with 250 meters to go, and Piil came in third.

In the 2003 Tour de France, Piil finally got the success he sought. At the 219 kilometres long stage 10, Piil was a part of a nine-man breakaway which ended up in a duel for the stage win between Piil and Fabio Sacchi. As the two riders neared the finishing line, they shook hands on a good final sprint, and Sacchi opened with Piil on the wheel, a position Piil used to his full advantage, sprinting past Sacchi just before the finishing line. In 2004, Piil tried again, and he won the title of the most aggressive rider in the 2004 Tour de France, but didn't get a stage win for his effort. Most of the 2005 season was ruined due to injuries, and Piil was left out of Team CSC's setup for the 2005 Tour de France. Instead, he rode the Vuelta a España, where he once again showed his tenacity to attack, and looked in great form until illness forced him to retire from the race. He recuperated in time for the World Cycling Championship where he got the biggest result of the season with a fifth place, behind winner Tom Boonen.

In 2006 Jakob Piil did not participate in any of the grand tours, and shortly after being left out of the 2006 Vuelta a España team, he wrote a contract with T-Mobile Team.

== Major results ==
1997
8th GP Aarhus
1998
4th GP Aarhus
1999
1st Overall Tour of Sweden

1st Stage 2

1st First Union Invitational
1st US Pro Championship
2nd Grand Prix de Villers-Cotterêts
5th Overall Danmark Rundt
9th Overall Peace Race
2001
1st Overall Peace Race

1st Stages 3 & 7

1st Road race, National Road Championships
1st Grand Prix d'Ouverture La Marseillaise
3rd Grand Prix of Aargau Canton
4th First Union Invitational
5th Overall Danmark Rundt
2002
1st Overall Danmark Rundt

1st Stage 1

1st Paris–Tours
10th Overall Peace Race

1st Stage 5

2003
1st Stage 10 Tour de France
1st GP Aarhus
1st Wachovia Invitational
2004
8th Overall Ster Elektrotoer
10th Wachovia Invitational
2005
4th Trofeo Città di Castelfidardo
10th Overall Sachsen-Tour
2006
2nd Gran Premio Industria e Commercio Artigianato Carnaghese
5th GP Ouest–France
