= Philip West =

American politician

Philip West is the former mayor of Natchez, Mississippi. He and other leaders were honored in 2024 at a Martin Luther King Jr. Day parade. He chaired the Adams County Board of Supervisors and was briefly a candidate for governor. He is a Democrat. He played baseball at Alcorn State and is in the Alcorn State Hall of Fame. He was the first African American to serve as mayor of Natchez since Reconstruction. He has also served as a school board member and advocated for bonds to fund education programs, accusing opponents of not wanting to fund education for black students.
