= Adolfo Alperi =

Spanish cyclist

Personal information
- Full name: Adolfo Alperi Plaza
- Born: 12 September 1970 (age 56) Oviedo, Spain

Cycling career
- Sport: Cycling

Adolfo Alperi Plaza (Note: In this Spanish name, the first or paternal surname is Alperi and the second or maternal family name is Plaza.) (born 12 September 1970) is a Spanish cyclist. He competed at the 1992 Summer Olympics and the 1996 Summer Olympics.
