= Dimitrios Georgalis =

Greek cyclist (born 1974)

Personal information
- Born: 23 February 1974 (age 52) Trikala, Greece
- Height: 1.78 m (5 ft 10 in)
- Weight: 78 kg (172 lb)

Cycling career
- Sport: Cycling
- Current team: Retired
- Discipline: Track
- Role: Rider
- Rider type: Sprinter

Dimitrios Georgalis (born 23 February 1974) is a Greek former cyclist. He competed at three Olympic Games, including Atlanta 1996, Sydney 2000, and Athens 2004.
