= Karen Dunne =

American cyclist (born 1967)

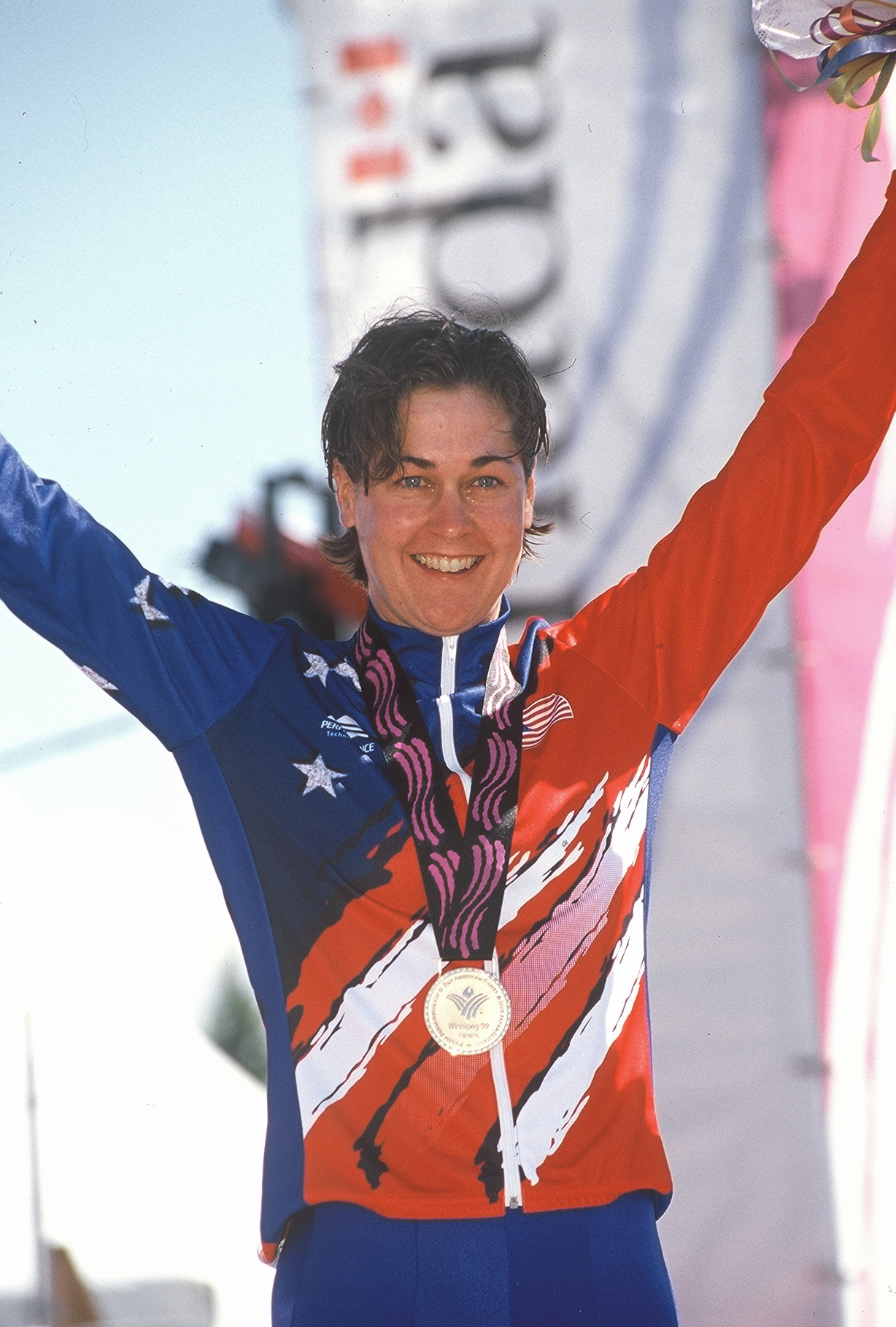
- Gold Medalist at 1999 Pan American Games

Personal information
- Full name: Karen Dunne
- Born: December 30, 1967 (age 58) Detroit, Michigan, U.S.

Cycling career
- Sport: Cycling
- Current team: Retired
- Disciplines: Road, Track
- Role: Rider
- Rider type: Field Sprinter, Points Racer

Major wins
- (gold) Pan American Games (1999)
Medal record
Representing United States
Women's road cycling
Pan American Games
Gold medal – first place	1999 Winnipeg	Road race

Karen Dunne (born December 30, 1967) is a retired female professional cyclist from the United States. She is best known for winning the gold medal at the women's individual road race at the 1999 Pan American Games in Winnipeg, Manitoba, Canada. She also won 11 U.S. National Championships: 3 Elite (Points race, Criterium, Kilometer Time Trial), 3 Collegiate (Criterium, 500 Meter Time Trial, Track Omnium), and 5 Mixed Tandem (Pursuit, 2 x Kilometer Time Trial, 2 x Match Sprints). Her cycling career began while attending Indiana University in Bloomington where she won the 1991 Women's Little 500.

== Career highlights ==
2000

- GP Feminin International du Quebec: First, second, and third place stage finishes
- GP Feminin International du Quebec: Most aggressive rider award
- USA Cycling's (USAC) Olympic Long Team, Road
- Selected to receive one of 100 Olympic Edition Commemorative vehicles through the UAW-GM The Team Behind The Team program in conjunction with the Sydney Olympic Games.
- Wendy's International Stage Race: Overall winner and two stage wins
- Sea Otter Classic: Stage winner, road race
- Redlands Bicycle Classic: Sprint jersey winner

1999

- Pan American Games Road Race: Gold medal
- U.S. National Criterium Championships: Gold medal
- Visa/USA Cycling's Elite Road Female Athlete of the Year
- HP International Women's Challenge: Sprint jersey winner
- UCI Women's Road World Cup, First Union Liberty Classic: Silver medal
- United States Association of Blind Athletes National Championships with Matt King: Gold medal - Mixed Tandem Match Sprints

1998

- UCI Track World Cups: 3rd and 4th, Points race
- United States Association of Blind Athletes National Championships: Gold medals - Mixed Tandem Match Sprints and Kilometer Time Trial

1997

- U.S. National Track Championships: Gold medal, Points race
- UCI Track World Cup: 5th, Points race
- United States Association of Blind Athletes National Championships: Gold medals - Mixed Tandem Pursuit and Kilometer Time Trial

1996

- Tour Cycliste Féminin: Two fourth place stage finishes (Stage 2 La Roche sur Yon to La Tremblade and Stage 5 Saint-Orens de Gameville to Carcassonne)

1995

- PowerBar International Women's Challenge: 2nd place - sprint classification
- U.S. Olympic Festival: Two Gold medals, two Silver medals

1994

- Goodwill Games: Bronze medal
- U.S. National Criterium Championships: Silver medal
- U.S. National Track Championships: Gold medal - Kilometer Time Trial; Bronze medal - Points race
- PowerBar International Women's Challenge: 1st, 2nd and 3rd place stage finishes
- U.S. Collegiate National Championships: Gold Medals - Criterium, 500 Meter Time Trial, and Track Omnium; Silver Medal - Match Sprints
