= Marcin Mientki =

Polish cyclist

Personal information
- Born: 1 July 1976 (age 50) Toruń, Poland

Cycling career
- Sport: Cycling

Marcin Mientki (born 1 July 1976) is a Polish cyclist. He competed in the men's team sprint at the 2000 Summer Olympics.
