= Alayna Burns =

Australian cyclist (born 1980)

Personal information
- Born: 25 January 1980 (age 46) Mackay, Queensland, Australia

Cycling career
- Sport: Cycling
Medal record
Commonwealth Games
Gold medal – first place	1998 Kuala Lumpur	Points race
Silver medal – second place	1998 Kuala Lumpur	3000m individual pursuit

Alayna Burns (born 25 January 1980) is an Australian track cyclist.

Burns competed at the 1998 Commonwealth Games winning a gold medal in the women's points race and a silver medal in the women's 3000m individual pursuit event.

She competed at the 2000 Summer Olympics in Sydney in the Women's individual pursuit event and the Women's points race.

Mother of 3, Harper, Avelyn, and Ari Borg
