= Tayeb Braikia =

Danish cyclist

Personal information
- Born: 8 March 1974 (age 52) Århus, Denmark

Cycling career
- Sport: Cycling
- Current team: Retired
- Discipline: Road
- Role: Rider
- Rider type: Sprinter

Professional teams
- 1998–1999: Acceptcard Pro Cycling
- 2000–2001: Linda McCartney Racing Team
- 2001–2002: Lotto–Adecco

Tayeb Braikia (born 8 March 1974 in Århus) is a Danish former cyclist.

== Major results ==
1996
1st U23 National Road Race Championships
1997
1st Stages 1 & 5 Cinturón a Mallorca
2nd Midtbank Grand Prix
3rd Overall Tour de Berlin
1998
1st Ronde van Overijssel
1999
1st Overall Circuit Franco-Belge

1st Stages 1 & 4

2001
1st Clásica de Almería
