= Frederik Bertelsen =

Danish cyclist (born 1974)

Personal information
- Born: 24 April 1974 (age 52) Copenhagen, Denmark

Cycling career
- Sport: Cycling

Frederik Bertelsen (born 24 April 1974) is a Danish former cyclist. He competed in the men's team pursuit at the 1996 Summer Olympics.
