= Lucy Tyler-Sharman =

Australian cyclist

Personal information
- Full name: Lucy Tyler-Sharman
- Born: 6 June 1965 (age 61) Louisville, United States

Cycling career
- Sport: Cycling
- Discipline: Track
- Role: Rider
Medal record
Women's track cycling
Representing Australia
Olympic Games
Bronze medal – third place	1996 Atlanta	Points race

Lucy Tyler-Sharman (born Lucy Tyler, in Louisville, Kentucky on 6 June 1965) is an Australian Olympic and World Champion cyclist.

As a junior, Tyler was a gifted sportswoman, focussing on swimming at junior high school and later triathlons. She moved into criterium events while living in Florida and in 1988 made the move to velodrome events. In 1990 she trained and raced in Australia, initially living in New South Wales. During this period she married track rider Martin Vinnicombe. The pair were training at the Trexlertown Velodrome facility in Pennsylvania in 1991, when Canadian drug testers at the request of their Australian counterparts recorded a positive drug test for Martin Vinnicombe. This ended Martin's career but the following year Lucy took up Australian residency and in the 1993 national championships in Alice Springs represented the state winning the sprint and 10 km scratch race.

In 1994 she won an Australian Institute of Sport scholarship as a sprinter and represented Australia in the World Championships in Sicily finishing fourth. The following year she competed in the World championships in Colombia recording ninth place in the individual pursuit and 19th in the sprint. She married Western Australian cyclist Graham Sharman in May 1995 and moved to Western Australia.

National coach Charlie Walsh convinced her to move to full-time track endurance events in December 1995. An expected good result at the February 1996 national titles in Perth were derailed when she suffered a severe asthma attack during the points race. She was subsequently beaten by Kathy Watt in the 3000m individual pursuit.

Shortly after, Watt was given a guarantee that she would ride in the Atlanta Olympics, with a proviso that the selection would be reviewed if another Australian rider posted a world-class time in the lead-up. Tyler-Sharman obliged during training in Germany by improving on Watts' 3000m national record by 5 seconds and moving to within 0.2 seconds of the world record. Watt was subsequently replaced by Tyler-Sharman, and a controversial legal battle ensued in which Watt was reinstated by appeal. Watt managed eighth in Atlanta while Tyler-Sharman watched from the stands. She missed selection in the pursuit, but did however compete in the 24 km points race, winning bronze.

The World Championships in Manchester in late 1996 saw her set a world record in qualifying and win silver in the final behind Marion Clignet.

Further national and international meets included winning the individual pursuit and time trials at the 1997 Oceania Championships in 1997, and winning a second national pursuit title. In Canada in 1998 she won pursuit and points races and she won gold in the pursuit in the World Cup in Berlin.

In the 1998 World Championships in Bordeaux she posted the fastest time in qualifying for the pursuit and in the final managed a time of 3:35.25 becoming the world champion.

At the 1998 Commonwealth Games in Kuala Lumpur, she was beaten in her individual pursuit semi-final ride after which she launched a public verbal tirade against team management and Charlie Walsh, suggesting that her prospects had been sabotaged by being forced to use unfamiliar pedals. The outburst saw her sent home, unable to compete in the ride-off for bronze. Tyler-Sharman is the only Australian athlete ever sent home from a Commonwealth Games meet.

In the lead-up to the 2000 Olympic Games in Sydney, the Australian Sports Commission controversially funded her return to competition to compete at the National Track Titles.

She now coaches in Pennsylvania under her maiden name, Lucy Kirkpatrick Stansbury Tyler.
