= Rasa Mažeikytė =

Lithuanian cyclist (born 1976)

Personal information
- Born: 31 March 1976 (age 50) Klaipėda, Lithuania

Cycling career
- Sport: Cycling
- Current team: Retired
- Disciplines: Road; Track
- Role: Rider
Medal record
Representing Lithuania
Women's track cycling
UCI World Championships
Bronze medal – third place	1999 Berlin	Individual pursuit

Rasa Mažeikytė (born 31 March 1976) is a Lithuanian former cyclist. She competed at the 1996 Summer Olympics and the 2000 Summer Olympics and won a bronze medal in the individual pursuit at the 1999 UCI Track Cycling World Championships. She also won the overall title in the individual pursuit at the 1999 UCI Track Cycling World Cup Classics.
