= Natalya Karimova =

Russian cyclist (born 1974)

Personal information
- Born: 28 February 1974 (age 52)

Cycling career
- Sport: Cycling

Natalya Karimova (born 28 February 1974) is a Russian cyclist. She competed at the 1996 Summer Olympics and the 2000 Summer Olympics.
