= Australian National Track Championships =

The Australian National Track Championships are held annually and are composed of competitions of various track cycling disciplines across various age, gender and disability categories.

== Men ==
=== Senior ===
Year	Gold	Silver	Bronze
1 mile
1967		Graeme Gilmore	
1978	Malcolm Hill	Mark Osborne	John Nicholson
4 km Pursuit
1958	Warren James Scarfe		
1966	John Perry	Graeme Gilmore	
1967	Barry Waddell	Graeme Gilmore	
1978	Steele Bishop	Rodney Johnson	Terry Hammond
1998	Michael Rogers	Timothy Lyons	Brett Lancaster
2000	Luke Roberts		
2001	Stephen Wooldridge		
2002	Peter Dawson		
2003	Mark Jamieson	Robert Wilson	Marc Ryan
2004	Chris Pascoe	Richard England	Bradley Norton
2005	Mark Jamieson	Stephen Wooldridge	David Pell
2006	Mark Jamieson	Peter Dawson	Richard England
2007	Phillip Thuaux	Zakkari Dempster	Cameron Meyer
2008	Mark Jamieson	Leigh Howard	Zakkari Dempster
2009	Jack Bobridge	Cameron Meyer	Leigh Howard
2010	Jack Bobridge	Rohan Dennis	Travis Meyer
2011	Jack Bobridge	Rohan Dennis	Michael Hepburn
2012	Michael Hepburn	Rohan Dennis	Mitchell Mulhern
2013	Michael Hepburn	Alexander Morgan	Alex Edmondson
2014	Alex Edmondson		
2015	Alexander Morgan		
2016	Sam Welsford		
2017	Jordan Kerby	Cameron Meyer	Kelland O'Brien
2018	Sam Welsford	Jordan Kerby	Kelland O'Brien
Kilo
2006	Ben Kersten	Joel Leonard	Adrian Sansonetti
2007	Ben Kersten	Joel Leonard	Scott Sunderland
2008	Joel Leonard	Jackson-Leigh Rathbone	Steven Sansonetti
2009	Shane Perkins	Joel Leonard	Scott Sunderland
2010	Joel Leonard	James Glasspool	Scott Law
2011	Jackson-Leigh Rathbone	Scott Law	James Glasspool
2012	James Glasspool	Scott Law	Jackson-Leigh Rathbone
2013	Glenn O'Shea	Luke Davison	Tirian McManus
Sprint
1909	Alfred Goullet		
1913	Alfred Goullet		
1963	Sid Patterson	Graeme Gilmore	
1966	Jim Cross	Graeme Gilmore	
1975	John Nicholson		
1976	John Nicholson		
1978	Grant Atkins	John Nicholson	Malcolm Hill
1995	Graham Sharman	Sean Eadie	
1996			Sean Eadie
1997		Sean Eadie	
1998			
1999			Sean Eadie
2000	Sean Eadie		
2001			Sean Eadie
2002	Sean Eadie		
2003			
2004	Sean Eadie	Ben Kersten	Damien Keirl
2005	Jobie Dajka	Shane Kelly	Sean Dwight
2006	Ben Kersten	Ryan Bayley	Kial Stewart
2007	Ryan Bayley	Mark French	Shane Perkins
2008	Mark French	Ryan Bayley	Shane Perkins
2009	Shane Perkins	Daniel Ellis	Alex Bird
2010	Daniel Ellis	Scott Sunderland	Alex Bird
2011	Shane Perkins	Scott Sunderland	Matthew Glaetzer
2012	Alex Bird	Shane Perkins	Matthew Glaetzer
2013	Mitchell Bullen	Matthew Glaetzer	Peter Lewis
Keirin
1999			Sean Eadie
2001		Sean Eadie	
2002		Sean Eadie	
2006	Ben Kersten	Shane Perkins	Ryan Bayley
2007	Joel Leonard	Shane Perkins	Daniel Ellis
2008	Mark French	Shane John Kelly	Daniel Ellis
2009	Shane Perkins	Scott Sunderland	Joel Leonard
2010	Scott Sunderland	Daniel Ellis	Andrew Taylor
2011	Shane Perkins	Jason Niblett	Andrew Taylor
2012	Matthew Glaetzer	Andrew Taylor	Mitchell Bullen
2013	Andrew Taylor	Scott Sunderland	Jacob Schmid
Points Race
2006	Miles Olman	Richard England	Sean Finning
2007	Jackson-Leigh Rathbone	Cameron Meyer	Zakkari Dempster
2008	Sean Finning	Mark Jamieson	Glenn O'Shea
2009	Glenn O'Shea	Jack Bobridge	Michael Freiberg
2010	Jack Bobridge	Luke Durbridge	Mitchell Mulhern
2011	Luke Durbridge	Glenn O'Shea	Michael Hepburn
2012	Jack Bobridge	Jackson Law	Jackson-Leigh Rathbone
2013	Alex Edmondson	Peter Loft	Caleb Ewan
Scratch Race
1962	Sid Patterson	Richard Ploog	Barry Waddell
1963	John Perry	Ronald Grenda	Sidney Patterson
1971	Jeffery Hartley	Barry Waddell	Robert Ryan
1973	Keith Oliver	Gordon Johnson	Laurie Venn
1978	Laurie Venn	Malcolm Hill	Frank Atkins
2006	Grant Irwyn	Michael Ford	Nathan Clarke
2007	Zakkari Dempster	James Carney	Cameron Meyer
2008	Leigh Howard	Jackson-Leigh Rathbone	Travis Meyer
2009	Glenn O'Shea	Jack Bobridge	=Richard Lang =Leigh Howard
2010	Scott Law	Michael Freiberg	Peter Loft
2011	Scott Law	Stephen Hall	Glenn O'Shea
2012	Jack Bobridge	Sean Finning	Edward Bissaker
2013	Luke Davison	Caleb Ewan	Stephen Hall

==== Team Pursuit ====
Year	Gold	Silver	Bronze
1978	Victoria: Graham McVilly, Steele Bishop, D. Jones, B. Gordon	Tasmania: Neville Allison, Frank Atkins, Mark Osborne, Graeme Hodgkiss	New South Wales
2006	Nathan Clarke, Matthew Harley Goss, Mark Jamieson & Stephen Rossendell	Zakkari Dempster, Richard England, Sean Finning & Michael Ford	Kyle Bateson, Ashley Hutchinson, Grant Irwyn & Miles Olman
2007	Zakkari Dempster, Richard England, Sean Finning & Michael Ford	Matthew Pettit, Robert Lyte, Jackson-Leigh Rathbone & Phillip Thuaux	Peter Dawson, Benjamin King, Cameron Meyer & Douglas Repacholi
2008	Sean Finning, Leigh Howard, James Langedyk & Glenn O'Shea	Richard Lang, Robert Lyte, Jackson-Leigh Rathbone & Dale Scarfe	Ben Grenda, Mark Jamieson, Peter Loft & Cameron Wurf
2009	Luke Durbridge, Michael Freiberg, Cameron Meyer & Travis Meyer	Leigh Howard, James Langedyk, Sean Finning & Glenn O'Shea	Dale Parker, Jack Bobridge, Sean Boyle & Rohan Dennis

==== Team Sprint ====
Year	Gold	Silver	Bronze
2006	William Draffen, Grant Irwyn & Benjamin Simonelli	Sean Dwight, Shaun Hopkins & Ben Kersten	Richard England, Joel Leonard & Shane Perkins
2007	Mark French, Joel Leonard & Shane Perkins	Ben Kersten, Michael Lewis & Andrew Taylor	Ryan Bayley, Peter Dawson & Scott Sunderland
2008	Mark French, Shane John Kelly & Shane Perkins	Ryan Bayley, Jason Holloway & Scott Sunderland	Alex Bird, Daniel Ellis & Gary Ryan
2009	Joel Leonard, Jason Niblett & Shane Perkins	Alex Bird, Daniel Ellis & Thomas Palmer	Paul Fellows, Peter Lewis & Andrew Taylor
2010	Daniel Ellis, Alex Bird & Gary Ryan	Andrew Taylor, Paul Fellows & Peter Lewis	David Millar, James Glasspool & Mark Glowacki
2011	Matthew Glaetzer, Nathan Corrigan-Martella & James Glasspool	Andrew Taylor, Mitchell Bullen & Peter Lewis	Daniel Ellis, Alex Bird & Gary Ryan
2012	Matthew Glaetzer, Nathan Corrigan-Martella & James Glasspool	Andrew Taylor, Mitchell Bullen & Peter Lewis	Jaron Gardiner, Jason Niblett & Shane Perkins

==== Madison ====
Year	Gold	Silver	Bronze
2007	Jack Bobridge & Glenn O'Shea	Mitchell Docker & Cameron Meyer	Leigh Howard & Travis Meyer
2008	Howard Leigh & Glenn O'Shea	Cameron Meyer & Travis Meyer	Mitchell Docker & Miles Olman

=== Junior ===
Year	Gold	Silver	Bronze
Pursuit
2009	Michael Hepburn	Luke Durbridge	Peter Loft
Kilo
2009	James Glasspool	Michael Hepburn	Maddison Hammond
Sprint
2009	Maddison Hammond	James Glasspool	Matthew Glaetzer
Keirin
2009	Maddison Hammond	Matthew Glaetzer	Aaron Box
Points Race
2009	Alex Carver	Aaron Donnelly	Jordan Kerby
Scratch Race
2009	Alex Carver	Luke Ockerby	Jordan Van Der Togt

==== Team Sprint ====
Year	Gold	Silver	Bronze
2009	Aaron Box, Nathan Corrigan-Martella & Maddison Hammond	Mitchell Bullen, Brendan J. Cole & Jamie Green	Jonathan Bathe, Jonathan Dunlop & Benjamin Wibberley

== Women ==
=== Senior ===
Year	Gold	Silver	Bronze
Pursuit
2000	Kathy Watt		
2001	Katherine Bates		
2002	Amy Safe		
2003	Katie Mactier		
2004	Katie Mactier		
2005	Katherine Bates	Sara Carrigan	Alexis Rhodes
2006	Katie Mactier	Katherine Bates	Alexis Rhodes
2007	Katie Mactier	Amanda Spratt	Monique Hanley
2008	Josephine Tomic	Tess Downing	Vicki Whitelaw
2009	Josephine Tomic	Sarah Kent	Tess Downing
2010	Sarah Kent	Ashlee Ankudinoff	Josephine Tomic
2011	Josephine Tomic		
2012	Annette Edmondson		
2013	Annette Edmondson		
2014	Amy Cure		
2015	Amy Cure		
2016	Ashlee Ankudinoff		
2017	Rebecca Wiasak	Amy Cure	Ashlee Ankudinoff
2018	Ashlee Ankudinoff	Amy Cure	Rebecca Wiasak
200m Flying TT
2000	Michelle Ferris		
2001	Kerrie Meares		
2002	Kerrie Meares		
2003	Anna Meares		
500m TT
2000	Lyndelle Higginson		
2001	Kerrie Meares		
2002	Kerrie Meares		
2003	Anna Meares		
2004	Anna Meares		
2005	Anna Meares		
2006	Kristine Bayley	Kerrie Meares	Chloe MacPherson
2007	Anna Meares	Kristine Bayley	Kaarle McCulloch
2008	Kaarle McCulloch	Kerrie Meares	Josephine Butler
2009	Anna Meares	Kaarle McCulloch	Emily Rosemond
2010	Kaarle McCulloch		
2011	Kaarle McCulloch		
2012	Kaarle McCulloch		
2013	Kaarle McCulloch		
2014	Anna Meares		
2015	Rikki Belder		
2016	Caitlin Ward		
2017	Breanna Hargrave	Rikki Belder	Tahlay Christie
2018	Kaarle McCulloch	Stephanie Morton	Breanna Hargrave
Sprint
2000	Michelle Ferris		
2001	Kerrie Meares		
2002	Kerrie Meares		
2003	Kerrie Meares		
2004	Anna Meares		
2005	Anna Meares		
2006	Anna Meares	Kerrie Meares	Kristine Bayley
2007	Kerrie Meares	Anna Meares	Kristine Bayley
2008	Kaarle McCulloch	Kerrie Meares	Emily Rosemond
2009	Anna Meares	Kaarle McCulloch	Kerrie Meares
2010	Kaarle McCulloch		
2011	Anna Meares		
2012	Anna Meares		
2013	Stephanie Morton		
2014	Anna Meares		
2015	Anna Meares		
2016	Anna Meares		
2017	Stephanie Morton	Courtney Field	Kaarle McCulloch
2018	Stephanie Morton	Caitlin Ward	Kaarle McCulloch
Keirin
2002	Rosealee Hubbard		
2003	Anna Meares		
2004	Rosealee Hubbard		
2005	Anna Meares		
2006	Kerrie Meares	Anna Meares	Kristine Bayley
2007	Anna Meares	Erica Allar	Kristine Bayley
2008	Kaarle McCulloch	Emily Rosemond	Cassandra Kell
2009	Kerrie Meares	Emily Rosemond	Anna Meares
2010	Kaarle McCulloch		
2011	Anna Meares		
2012	Anna Meares		
2013	Stephanie Morton		
2014	Stephanie Morton		
2015	Stephanie Morton		
2016	Anna Meares		
2017	Kaarle McCulloch	Madison Janssen	Courtney Field
2018	Stephanie Morton	Kaarle McCulloch	Rikki Belder
Points Race
2000	Karen Barrow		
2001	Katherine Bates		
2002	Rochelle Gilmore		
2003	Rochelle Gilmore		
2004	Alexis Rhodes		
2005	Katherine Bates		
2006	Katherine Bates	Amanda Spratt	Alexis Rhodes
2007	Belinda Goss	Tess Downing	Amanda Spratt
2008	Belinda Goss	Tess Downing	Josephine Tomic
2009	Belinda Goss	Skye-lee Armstrong	Tess Downing
2010	Belinda Goss		
2011	Josephine Tomic		
2012	Annette Edmondson		
2013	Annette Edmondson		
2014	Annette Edmondson		
2015	Melissa Hoskins		
2016	Annette Edmondson		
2017	Amy Cure	Alexandra Manly	Kristina Clonan
2018	Amy Cure	Kristina Clonan	Ashlee Ankudinoff
Scratch Race
2000	Lyndelle Higginson		
2001	Kerrie Meares		
2002	Rochelle Gilmore		
2003	Rochelle Gilmore		
2004	Rochelle Gilmore		
2005	Katherine Bates		
2006	Katherine Bates	Jessica Berry	Belinda Goss
2007	Skye-lee Armstrong	Tess Downing	Rochelle Gilmore
2008	Laura McCaughey	Jessie MacLean	Toireasa Gallagher
2009	Skye-lee Armstrong	Belinda Goss	Elizabeth Georgouras
2010	Belinda Goss		
2011	Annette Edmondson		
2012	Isabella King		
2013	Annette Edmondson		
2014	Annette Edmondson		
2015	Lauren Perry		
2016	Annette Edmondson		
2017	Amy Cure	Kristina Clonan	Georgia Baker
2018	Amy Cure	Georgia Baker	Kristina Clonan
Omnium
2013	Annette Edmondson		
2014	Annette Edmondson		
2015	Ashlee Ankudinoff		
2016	Danielle McKinnirey		
2017	Amy Cure	Alexandra Manly	Josie Talbot
2018	Ashlee Ankudinoff	Alexandra Manly	Josie Talbot

==== Team Pursuit ====
Year	Gold	Silver	Bronze
2008	Melissa Hoskins, Sarah Kent, & Josephine Tomic	Ashlee Ankudinoff, Megan Dunn & Lauren Kitchen	Tess Downing, Kendelle Hodges & Helen Kelly
2009	Melissa Hoskins, Sarah Kent, & Josephine Tomic	Helen Kelly, Chloe McConville & Nicole Whitburn	Amy Cure, Sarah Cure & Harriet Kossmann
2017	Danielle McKinnirey, Breanna Hargrave, Chloe Moran, & Alexandra Manly	Ruby Roseman-Gannon, Samantha de Ritter, Alice Culling, & Jemma Eastwood	Hannah Osborn, Maeve Plouffe, Brooklyn Vonderwall, & Sophie Edwards
2018	Breanna Hargrave, Annette Edmondson, Alexandra Manly, & Maeve Plouffe	Kristina Clonan, Katrin Garfoot, Alexandra Martin-Wallace, & Laurelea Moss	Ashlee Ankudinoff, Angela Smith, Josie Talbot & Nicola Macdonald

==== Team Sprint ====
Year	Gold	Silver	Bronze
2008	Kerrie Meares & Emily Rosemond	Cassandra Kell & Kaarle McCulloch	Annette Edmondson & Stephanie Morton
2009	Kerrie Meares & Emily Rosemond	Rebecca Stevenson & Anna Meares	Teegan Morton & Holly Williams
2012	Rikki Belder & Anna Meares	Cassandra Kell & Kaarle McCulloch	Ziggy Callan & Adele Sylvester
2013	Rikki Belder & Stephanie Morton		
2014	Rikki Belder & Stephanie Morton		
2015	Rikki Belder, Anna Meares & Stephanie Morton		
2016	Anna Meares & Stephanie Morton		
2017	Rikki Belder & Stephanie Morton	Kaarle McCulloch & Sophie Knox	Tahlay Christie & Rihana Pezaj
2018	Rikki Belder & Stephanie Morton	Kaarle McCulloch & Selina Ho	Caitlin Ward & Maddie Janssen

==== Madison ====
Year	Gold	Silver	Bronze
2014	Annette Edmondson & Jessica Mundy		
2015	Annette Edmondson & Jessica Mundy	Georgia Baker & Macey Stewart	Ashlee Ankudinoff & Imogen Jelbart
2016	Georgia Baker & Danielle McKinnirey		
2017	Alexandra Manly & Danielle McKinnirey		
2018	Kristina Clonan & Macey Stewart	Annette Edmondson & Alexandra Manly	Ashlee Ankudinoff & Josie Talbot

=== Junior ===
Year	Gold	Silver	Bronze
Pursuit
2008	Sarah Kent	Ashlee Ankudinoff	Megan Dunn
2009	Amy Cure	Michaela Anderson	Melissa Hoskins
500m TT
2008	Annette Edmondson	Philippa Hindmarsh	Stephanie Morton
2009	Annette Edmondson	Holly Williams	Naomi Pinto
Sprint
2008	Annette Edmondson	Stephanie Morton	Philippa Hindmarsh
2009	Annette Edmondson	Naomi Pinto	Amy Cure
Keirin
2008	Annette Edmondson	Melissa Hoskins	Stephanie Morton
2009	Melissa Hoskins	Annette Edmondson	Rebecca Stevenson
Points Race
2008	Megan Dunn	Sarah Kent	Chloe Hosking
2009	Megan Dunn	Kendelle Hodges	Melissa Hoskins
Scratch Race
2008	Chloe Hosking	Philippa Hindmarsh	Megan Dunn
2009	Annette Edmondson	Amy Cure	Megan Dunn
