= 2011 Oceania Track Championships =

- Venue: Adelaide, Australia
- Date: 24–27 November 2010
- Velodrome: Adelaide Super-Drome
- Nations participating: Australia & New Zealand
- Cyclists participating: 145 (83 Elite)
- Events: 36

The 2011 Oceania Track Championships were the 2011 edition of the annual Oceania Track Championships and were held at the Adelaide Super-Drome in Adelaide, Australia. The championships were the first opportunity for riders from Oceania to qualify for the 2012 Summer Olympics. All ten Olympic events (sprint, team sprint, keirin, team pursuit and omnium) were included for both men and women. Non-Olympics events (time trial, individual pursuit, points race, scratch race) were also included for both men and women as well as madison for men. Under 19 events were also held for each event; however, the men's madison and women's (keirin, team sprint, team pursuit, points race and omnium were combined Under 19 and Elite events.

== Eligible nations ==
Country	Federation
Australia	Cycling Australia
Timor-Leste	East Timor Cycling Federation
Fiji	Fiji Cycling Association
Guam	Guam Cycling Federation
Indonesia	Indonesian Cycling Federation (Ikatan Sepeda Sport Indonesia)
New Zealand	BikeNZ

== Medal summary ==
Event	Gold		Silver		Bronze	
Men's events
Men's sprint	Peter Lewis; Australia		Andrew Taylor; Australia		Eddie Dawkins; New Zealand	
Men's 1 km time trial	Scott Sunderland; Australia	1.02.660	James Glasspool; Australia	1.03.442	Cameron Karwowski; New Zealand	1.04.362
Men's individual pursuit	Michael Hepburn; Australia	4.19.137	Jack Bobridge; Australia	4.24.042	Mitchell Lovelock-Fay; Australia	4.29.055
Men's team pursuit	Jack Bobridge; Michael Hepburn; Leigh Howard; Cameron Meyer; Australia	4.02.270	Aaron Gate; Cameron Karwowski; Myron Simpson; Jason Allen; New Zealand	4.08.280	Edward Bissaker; Jordan Kerby; Mitchell Lovelock-Fay; Mitchell Mulhern; Australia	
Men's team sprint	Daniel Ellis; Jason Niblett; Scott Sunderland; Australia	44.713	Edward Dawkins; Ethan Mitchell; Sam Webster; New Zealand	44.967	Alex Bird; Matthew Galetzer; Peter Lewis; Australia	45.698
Men's keirin	Jason Niblett; Australia		Simon van Velthooven; New Zealand		Mitchell Bullen; Australia	
Men's scratch	Leigh Howard; Australia		Aaron Donnelly; Australia		Damien Howson; Australia	
Men's points race	Jordan Kerby; Australia	34	Brent Nelson; Australia	32	Aaron Donnelly; Australia	22
Men's madison	Leigh Howard; Cameron Meyer; Australia	21	Aaron Gate; Myron Simpson; New Zealand	-1 24	Alex Edmondson; Mitchell benson Australia	-1 8
Men's omnium	Shane Archbold; New Zealand	9	Myron Simpson; New Zealand	16	Aaron Gate; New Zealand	19
Women's events
Women's sprint	Anna Meares; Australia		Kaarle McCulloch; Australia		Emily Rosemond; Australia	
Women's 500 m time trial	Kaarle McCulloch; Australia	34.782	Stephanie Morton; Australia	35.964	Cassandra Kell; Australia	36.173
Women's individual pursuit	Jamie Neilsen; New Zealand	3.41.597	Kaytee Boyd; New Zealand	3.42.819	Rebecca Werner; New Zealand	3.48.504
Women's team pursuit	Katherine Bates; Sarah Kent; Josephine Tomic; Australia	3.29.378	Kaytee Boyd; Lauren Ellis; Jamie Neilson; New Zealand	3.31.570	Sequoia Cooper; Gemma Dudley; Alexandra Neems; New Zealand	3.37.761
Women's team sprint	Kaarle McCulloch; Emily Rosemond; Australia	34.362	Natasha Hansen; Henrietta Mitchell; New Zealand	35.704	Stephanie Morton; Stephanie McKenzie; Australia; New Zealand	35.110
Women's keirin	Anna Meares; Australia		Emily Rosemond; Australia		Natasha Hansen; New Zealand	
Women's scratch	Katherine Bates; Australia		Megan Dunn; Australia		Annette Edmondson; Australia	
Women's points race	Megan Dunn; Australia	26	Sarah Kent; Australia	17	Melissa Hoskins; Australia	10
Women's omnium	Melissa Hoskins; Australia	15	Isabella King; Australia	16	Sarah Kent; Australia	26

== Medal summary U19 ==
Event	Gold		Silver		Bronze	
Men's Under 19 Events
Men's U19 sprint	Timothy McMillan; Australia		Zac Deller; Australia		Luke Zaccaria; Australia	
Men's U19 1 km time trial	Zac Deller; Australia	1.04.745	Jaron Gardiner; Australia	1.05.357	Timothy McMillan; Australia	1.05.782
Men's U19 individual pursuit	Alex Edmondson; Australia	3.22.613	Alexander Morgan; Australia	3.24.530	Mitchell Benson; Australia	3.24.930
Men's U19 team pursuit	Mitchell Benson; Alex Edmondson; Evan Hull; Alexander Morgan; Australia	4.15.676	Jacob Junghanns; Dylan Kennett; Hayden McCormick; Pieter Bulling; New Zealand	4.18.744	Robert-Jon McCarthy; Phillip Mundy; Miles Scotson; George Tansley; Australia	
Men's U19 team sprint	Zac Deller; Timothy McMillan; Luke Zacaria; Australia		Tom Beadle; Tayla Harrison; Matt Noble; New Zealand		Nathan Hart; Luke Parker; Jacob Schmid; Australia	
Men's U19 keirin	Emerson Harwood; Australia		Tom Beadle; New Zealand		Luke Parker; Australia	
Men's U19 scratch	George Tansley; Australia		Caleb Ewan; Australia		Jack Cummings; Australia	
Men's U19 points race	Pieter Bulling; New Zealand	15	Mitchell Benson; Australia	13	Phillip Mundy; Australia	11
Men's U19 omnium	Mitchell Benson; Australia	16	Alex Edmondson; Australia	18	Jack Cummings; Australia	28
Women's Under 19 Events
Women's U19 sprint	Stephanie McKenzie; New Zealand		Adele Sylvester; Australia		Paige Paterson; New Zealand	
Women's U19 500 m time trial	Stephanie McKenzie; New Zealand	36.279	Adele Sylvester; Australia	36.563	Imogen Jelbart; Australia	37.024
Women's U19 individual pursuit	Georgia Baker; Australia	2.32.836	Georgia Williams; New Zealand	2.34.341	Letitia Custance; Australia	2.32.419
Women's U19 scratch	Taylah Jennings; Australia		Jessica Mundy; Australia		Georgia Williams; New Zealand	

== Elite medal table ==
Rank	Nation	Gold	Silver	Bronze	Total
1	Australia (AUS)	17	12	12	41
2	New Zealand (NZL)	2	7	6	15
Totals (2 entries)		19	19	18	56

== U19 medal table ==
Rank	Nation	Gold	Silver	Bronze	Total
1	Australia (AUS)	10	9	11	30
2	New Zealand (NZL)	3	4	2	9
Totals (2 entries)		13	13	13	39

== Overall medal table ==
Rank	Nation	Gold	Silver	Bronze	Total
1	Australia (AUS)	27	21	23	71
2	New Zealand (NZL)	5	11	8	24
Totals (2 entries)		32	32	31	95

== Olympic event medal table ==
Rank	Nation	Gold	Silver	Bronze	Total
1	Australia (AUS)	9	4	5	18
2	New Zealand (NZL)	1	6	4	11
Totals (2 entries)		10	10	9	29
