= 2008 UCI Juniors Track World Championships =

- Venue: Cape Town, South Africa
- Date: 12–16 August 2008

The 2008 UCI Juniors Track World Championships were the 34th annual Junior World Championships for track cycling held at Cape Town, in South Africa, from 12 to 16 August.

The Championships had ten events for men (sprint, points race, individual pursuit, team pursuit, 1 kilometre time trial, team sprint, keirin, madison, scratch race, omnium) and eight for women (sprint, individual pursuit, 500 metre time trial, points race, keirin, scratch race, team sprint, team pursuit).

== Events ==
Event	Gold	Silver	Bronze
Men's Events
Sprint	Quentin Lafargue; France	Charlie Conord; France	Thierry Jollet; France
Points race	Tosh Van der Sande; Belgium	Cristobal Olavarria; Chile	Luke Durbridge; Australia
Individual pursuit	Taylor Phinney; United States	Rohan Dennis; Australia	Jason Christie; New Zealand
Team pursuit	Luke Davison; Rohan Dennis; Luke Durbridge; Thomas Palmer; Australia	Artur Ershov; Konstantin Kuperasov; Viktor Shmalko; Matvey Zubov; Russia	Jason Christie; Aaron Gate; Ruaraidh McLeod; Michael Vink; New Zealand
Time trial	Quentin Lafargue; France	Thomas Palmer; Australia	Scott Law; Australia
Team sprint	Charlie Conord; Thierry Jollet; Quentin Lafargue; France	Scott Law; Peter Lewis; Ben Sanders; Australia	Grzegorz Drejgier; Karol Kasprzyk; Rafał Sarnecki; Poland
Keirin	Charlie Conord; France	Sotirios Bretas; Greece	Paul Fellows; Australia
Madison	Luke Davison; Thomas Palmer; Australia	Tosh Van der Sande; Gijs Van Hoecke; Belgium	Silvan Dillier; Claudio Imhof; Switzerland
Scratch race	Michael Vingerling; Netherlands	Carlos Linarez; Venezuela	Alexander Emanuel Caselles; Argentina
Omnium	Luke Davison; Australia	Moreno De Pauw; Belgium	Ramón Domene; Spain

Event	Gold	Silver	Bronze
Women's Events
Sprint	Kristina Vogel; Germany	Annette Edmondson; Australia	Victoria Baranova; Russia
Individual pursuit	Ashlee Ankudinoff; Australia	Sarah Kent; Australia	Gemma Dudley; New Zealand
Time trial	Kristina Vogel; Germany	Victoria Baranova; Russia	Olivia Montauban; France
Points race	Megan Dunn; Australia	Valentina Scandolara; Italy	Gemma Dudley; New Zealand
Keirin	Kristina Vogel; Germany	Olivia Montauban; France	Giada Balzan; Italy
Scratch race	Megan Dunn; Australia	Gemma Dudley; New Zealand	Colleen Hayduk; United States
Team sprint	Magali Baudacci; Olivia Montauban; France	Aleksandra Drejgier; Kornelia Maczka; Poland	Victoria Baranova; Galina Streltsova; Russia
Team pursuit	Ashlee Ankudinoff; Megan Dunn; Sarah Kent; Australia	Sequoia Cooper; Gemma Dudley; Cathy Jordan; New Zealand	Evelyn Arys; Jessie Daams; Jolien D'Hoore; Belgium

== Medal table ==
* Host nation (South Africa)

Rank	Nation	Gold	Silver	Bronze	Total
1	Australia (AUS)	7	5	3	15
2	France (FRA)	5	2	2	9
3	Germany (GER)	3	0	0	3
4	Belgium (BEL)	1	2	1	4
5	United States (USA)	1	0	1	2
6	Netherlands (NED)	1	0	0	1
7	New Zealand (NZL)	0	2	4	6
8	Russia (RUS)	0	2	2	4
9	Italy (ITA)	0	1	1	2
9	Poland (POL)	0	1	1	2
11	Chile (CHI)	0	1	0	1
11	Greece (GRE)	0	1	0	1
11	Venezuela (VEN)	0	1	0	1
14	Argentina (ARG)	0	0	1	1
14	Spain (SPA)	0	0	1	1
14	Switzerland (SUI)	0	0	1	1
Totals (16 entries)		18	18	18	54
