= 2010 Oceania Track Championships =

- Venue: Invercargill, New Zealand
- Date: 11–15 November 2009
- Velodrome: ILT Velodrome
- Nations participating: Australia & New Zealand
- Events: 28

The 2010 Oceania Track Championships were the 2010 edition of the annual Oceania Track Championships and were held at the ILT Velodrome in Invercargill, New Zealand. Eight of the 10 Olympic events (sprint, team sprint, keirin, and team pursuit) were included for both men and women, however omnium was excluded because at this point it was not in the 2012 Summer Olympics programme. Non-Olympics events (time trial, individual pursuit, points race, scratch race) were also included for both men and women as well as madison for men. Under 19 events were also held for each event, however the men's madison and women's (keirin, team sprint, team pursuit, points race and scratch race were combined Under 19 and Elite events.

== Eligible nations ==
Country	Federation
Australia	Cycling Australia
Timor-Leste	East Timor Cycling Federation
Fiji	Fiji Cycling Association
Guam	Guam Cycling Federation
Indonesia	Indonesian Cycling Federation (Ikatan Sepeda Sport Indonesia)
New Zealand	BikeNZ

== Medal summary ==
Event	Gold		Silver		Bronze	
Men's events
Men's sprint	Daniel Ellis; Australia		Sam Webster; New Zealand		Matthew Archibold; New Zealand	
Men's 1 km time trial	Eddie Dawkins; New Zealand	1.03.353	Joel Leonard; Australia	1.04.112	James Glasspool; Australia	1.04.118
Men's individual pursuit	Jesse Sergent; New Zealand	4.20.678	Peter Latham; New Zealand	4.28.758	Sam Bewley; New Zealand	4.23.264
Men's team pursuit	Peter Latham; Sam Bewley; Marc Ryan; Westley Gough; New Zealand	3.58.689	Tom Scully; Myron Simpson; Jason Christie; Aaron Gate; New Zealand	4.07.127	N/A	
Men's team sprint	Andrew Williams; Eddie Dawkins; Simon van Velthooven; New Zealand	45.693	Daniel Ellis; James Glasspool; Joel Leonard; Australia	45.863	Sam Webster; Ethan Mitchell; Adam Stewart; New Zealand	45.820
Men's keirin	Joel Leonard; Australia		Sam Webster; New Zealand		Simon van Velthooven; New Zealand	
Men's scratch	Scott Law; Australia		Alex Carver; Australia		Shem Rodger; New Zealand	
Men's points race	Sam Bewley; New Zealand	40	Marc Ryan; New Zealand	38	Tom Scully; New Zealand	29
Men's madison	Tom Scully; Jesse Sergent; New Zealand	36	Alex Carver; Scott Law; Australia	24	Aaron Gate; Myron Simpson; New Zealand	16
Women's events
Women's sprint	Emily Rosemond; Australia		Stephanie Morton; Australia		Annette Edmondson; Australia	
Women's 500 m time trial	Annette Edmondson; Australia	35.956	Emily Rosemond; Australia	35.992	Stephanie Morton; Australia	36.090
Women's individual pursuit	Alison Shanks; New Zealand	3.35.221	Lauren Ellis; New Zealand	3.44.566	Rushlee Buchanan; New Zealand	3.45.606
Women's team pursuit	Kaytee Boyd; Rushlee Buchanan; Lauren Ellis; New Zealand	3.26.658	Jamie Neilson; Gemma Dudley; Janne Kiesanowski; New Zealand	3.31.937	N/A	
Women's team sprint	Annette Edmondson; Emily Rosemond; Australia	35.358	Heniretta Mitchell; Stephanie McKenzie; New Zealand	36.720	Madison Law; Stephanie Morton; Australia	36.474
Women's keirin	Emily Rosemond; Australia		Stephanie Morton; Australia		Annette Edmondson; Australia	
Women's scratch	Joanne Kiesanowski; New Zealand		Lauren Ellis; New Zealand		Rosy McCall; New Zealand	
Women's points race	Joanne Kiesanowski; New Zealand	23	Gemma Dudley; New Zealand	14	Kaytee Boyd; New Zealand	12

== Medal summary U19 ==
Event	Gold		Silver		Bronze	
Men's Under 19 events
Men's U19 sprint	Matthew Glaetzer; Australia		Jamie Green; Australia		Regan Sheath; New Zealand	
Men's U19 1 km time trial	Alex Frame; New Zealand	1.09.586	Regan Sheath; New Zealand	1.09.994	James Verco; New Zealand	1.10.217
Men's U19 individual pursuit	Jackson Law; Australia	3.25.881	Alex Edmondson; Australia	3.26.958	Pieter Bulling; New Zealand	3.29.231
Men's U19 team pursuit	Matthew Glaetzer; Jackson Law; Alex Edmondson; Jack Bennett; Australia	4.23.423	Pieter Bulling; Dillon Bennett; Brehan Cairns; Troy Smith; New Zealand	4.27.818	N/A	
Men's U19 team sprint	Jamie Green; Matthew Glaetzer; Jackson Law; Australia	48.828	Regan Sheath; James Vercol; James Northey; New Zealand	51.194	N/A	
Men's U19 keirin	Matthew Glaetzer; Australia		Jamie Green; Australia		Regan Sheath; New Zealand	
Men's U19 scratch	Jackson Law; Australia		Jack Bennett; Australia		Fraser Gough; New Zealand	
Men's U19 points race	Alex Edmondson; Australia	44	Jackson Law; Australia	43	Jack Bennett; Australia	30
Women's Under 19 events
Women's U19 sprint	Stephanie McKenzie; New Zealand		Heniretta Mitchell; New Zealand		Charlotte Kelly; New Zealand	
Women's U19 500 m time trial	Stephanie McKenzie; New Zealand	37.231	Heniretta Mitchell; New Zealand	37.864	Madison Law; Australia	38.321
Women's U19 individual pursuit	Georgia Williams; New Zealand	2.40.503	N/A		N/A	

== Elite medal table ==
Rank	Nation	Gold	Silver	Bronze	Total
1	New Zealand (NZL)	10	10	10	30
2	Australia (AUS)	7	7	5	19
Totals (2 entries)		17	17	15	49

== U19 medal table ==
Rank	Nation	Gold	Silver	Bronze	Total
1	Australia (AUS)	7	5	2	14
2	New Zealand (NZL)	4	5	6	15
Totals (2 entries)		11	10	8	29

== Overall medal table ==
Rank	Nation	Gold	Silver	Bronze	Total
1	New Zealand (NZL)	14	15	16	45
2	Australia (AUS)	14	12	7	33
Totals (2 entries)		28	27	23	78

== Olympic event medal table ==
Rank	Nation	Gold	Silver	Bronze	Total
1	Australia (AUS)	5	3	3	11
2	New Zealand (NZL)	3	5	3	11
Totals (2 entries)		8	8	6	22
