= 2007 UCI Track Cycling World Championships – Men's sprint =

Men's sprint at the 2007 UCI Track Cycling World Championships
- Venue: Palma Arena
- Location: Palma de Mallorca, Spain
- Dates: 31 March – 1 April 2007
- Competitors: 39 from 16 nations

Medalists
gold medal	Theo Bos	Netherlands
silver medal	Grégory Baugé	France
bronze medal	Craig MacLean	France

Rainbow jersey

The men's sprint was one of the 10 men's events at the 2007 UCI Track World Championship, held in Palma de Mallorca, Spain.

39 cyclists from 16 countries participated in the contest. After the qualifying heats, the fastest 24 riders in each advanced to the 1/16 finals.

The first rider in each of the 12 heats advance to the second round. There is no repechage for this round.

The first rider from each of the six second round heats advance to the quarterfinals and the second placed riders face a repechage to determine the other two that will complete the quarterfinals.

The first rider in each quarterfinal advanced to the semifinals and the four losing athletes faced a race for 5th–8th place.

The qualifying, first round, second round, second round repechages and quarterfinals took place on 31 March. The semifinals and finals took place on 1 April. The final started at 17:20.

== World record ==
World record
WR	9.772	Theo Bos (NED)	Moscow (Russia)	16 December 2006

== Qualification ==
Rank	Name	Nation	Time			Speed (km/h)	Notes
Rank	Name	Nation	0–100m	100-200m	Total	Speed (km/h)	Notes
1	Mickaël Bourgain	France	4.944 (1)	5.024 (1)	9.968	72.231	Q
2	Theo Bos	Netherlands	4.971 (3)	5.074 (2)	10.045	71.677	Q
3	Craig MacLean	Great Britain	4.985 (4)	5.125 (4)	10.110	71.216	Q
4	Grégory Baugé	France	4.964 (2)	5.170 (7)	10.134	71.047	Q
5	Maximilian Levy	Germany	5.029 (5)	5.134 (5)	10.163	70.845	Q
6	Ross Edgar	Great Britain	5.066 (7)	5.125 (3)	10.191	70.650	Q
7	José Antonio Escuredo	Spain	5.045 (6)	5.209 (10)	10.254	70.216	Q
8	Stefan Nimke	Germany	5.078 (8)	5.186 (9)	10.264	70.148	Q
9	Tim Veldt	Netherlands	5.093 (11)	5.178 (8)	10.271	70.100	Q
10	Łukasz Kwiatkowski	Poland	5.117 (13)	5.169 (6)	10.286	69.998	Q
11	Teun Mulder	Netherlands	5.086 (10)	5.217 (11)	10.303	69.882	Q
12	Mark French	Australia	5.082 (9)	5.242 (14)	10.324	69.740	Q
13	Damian Zieliński	Poland	5.117 (14)	5.227 (12)	10.344	69.605	Q
14	Ryan Bayley	Australia	5.120 (15)	5.232 (13)	10.352	69.551	Q
15	Arnaud Tournant	France	5.101 (12)	5.252 (6)	10.353	69.545	Q
16	Roberto Chiappa	Italy	5.141 (18)	5.242 (15)	10.383	69.344	Q
17	Shane Perkins	Australia	5.131 (16)	5.283 (21)	10.414	69.137	Q
17	Andriy Vynokurov	Ukraine	5.153 (21)	5.261 (17)	10.414	69.137	Q
19	Matthew Crampton	Great Britain	5.152 (20)	5.279 (20)	10.431	69.025	Q
20	Scott Sunderland	Australia	5.154 (22)	5.279 (19)	10.433	69.011	Q
21	Matthias John	Germany	5.148 (19)	5.326 (25)	10.474	68.741	Q
22	Michael Seidenbecher	Germany	5.187 (25)	5.293 (22)	10.480	68.702	Q
23	Tsubasa Kitatsuru	Japan	5.212 (27)	5.270 (18)	10.482	68.689	Q
24	Ricardo Lynch	Jamaica	5.132 (17)	5.360 (28)	10.492	68.623	Q
25	Denis Dmitriev	Russia	5.180 (24)	5.326 (26)	10.506	68.532	
26	Zhang Lei	China	5.192 (26)	5.315 (23)	10.507	68.525	
27	Adam Ptáčník	Czech Republic	5.214 (28)	5.321 (24)	10.535	68.343	
28	Kazunari Watanabe	Japan	5.167 (23)	5.374 (29)	10.541	68.304	
29	Sergey Borisov	Russia	5.218 (29)	5.355 (27)	10.573	68.097	
30	Kiyofumi Nagai	Japan	5.227 (30)	5.407 (31)	10.634	67.707	
31	Tang Qi	China	5.277 (31)	5.407 (30)	10.684	67.390	
32	Azizulhasni Awang	Malaysia	5.285 (32)	5.447 (34)	10.732	67.089	
33	Mohd Rizal Tisin	Malaysia	5.323 (34)	5.428 (32)	10.751	66.970	
34	Maciej Bielecki	Poland	5.316 (33)	5.472 (35)	10.788	66.740	
35	Denis Špička	Czech Republic	5.347 (35)	5.447 (33)	10.794	66.703	
36	Mikhail Shikhalev	Russia	5.350 (36)	5.491 (37)	10.841	66.414	
37	Ivan Vrba	Czech Republic	5.378 (38)	5.491 (36)	10.869	66.243	
38	Itmar Esteban Herraiz	Spain	5.354 (37)	5.524 (38)	10.878	66.188	
–	Travis Smith	Canada					DNS

== 1/16 finals ==
Heat	Rank	Name	Nation	200m time	Speed (km/h)	Q
1	1	Mickaël Bourgain	France	11.255	63.971	Q
1	2	Ricardo Lynch	Jamaica			
2	1	Theo Bos	Netherlands	10.814	66.580	Q
2	2	Tsubasa Kitatsuru	Japan			
3	1	Craig MacLean	Great Britain	10.860	66.298	Q
3	2	Michael Seidenbecher	Germany			
4	1	Grégory Baugé	France	10.851	66.353	Q
4	2	Matthias John	Germany			
5	1	Maximilian Levy	Germany	10.627	67.751	Q
5	2	Scott Sunderland	Australia			
6	1	Ross Edgar	Great Britain	10.846	66.383	Q
6	2	Matthew Crampton	Great Britain			
7	1	José Antonio Escuredo	Spain	10.942	65.801	Q
7	2	Andriy Vynokurov	Ukraine			
8	1	Stefan Nimke	Germany	10.747	66.995	Q
8	2	Shane Perkins	Australia			
9	1	Roberto Chiappa	Italy	18.444	39.037	Q
9	2	Tim Veldt	Netherlands			
10	1	Arnaud Tournant	France	10.956	65.717	Q
10	2	Łukasz Kwiatkowski	Poland			
11	1	Ryan Bayley	Australia	10.739	67.045	Q
11	2	Teun Mulder	Netherlands			
12	1	Mark French	Australia	11.039	65.223	Q
12	2	Damian Zieliński	Poland			

== 1/8 finals ==
Heat	Rank	Name	Nation	200m time	Speed (km/h)	Q
1	1	Mickaël Bourgain	France	10.484	68.676	Q
1	2	Mark French	Australia			
2	1	Theo Bos	Netherlands	10.432	69.018	Q
2	2	Ryan Bayley	Australia			
3	1	Craig MacLean	Great Britain	10.723	67.126	Q
3	2	Arnaud Tournant	France			
4	1	Grégory Baugé	France	10.988	65.526	Q
4	2	Roberto Chiappa	Italy			
5	1	Maximilian Levy	Germany	10.724	67.139	Q
5	2	Stefan Nimke	Germany			
6	1	Ross Edgar	Great Britain	10.871	66.231	Q
6	2	José Antonio Escuredo	Spain			

== 1/8 finals repechage ==
Heat	Rank	Name	Nation	200m time	Speed (km/h)	Q
1	1	Roberto Chiappa	Italy	10.885	66.146	Q
1	2	José Antonio Escuredo	Spain			
1	3	Mark French	Australia			
2	1	Stefan Nimke	Germany	10.783	66.771	Q
2	2	Arnaud Tournant	France			
2	3	Ryan Bayley	Australia			

== Quarterfinals ==
Heat	Rank	Name	Nation	1st race	2nd race	Decider	Q
1	1	Mickaël Bourgain	France	10.644	10.892		Q
1	2	Stefan Nimke	Germany				
2	2	Theo Bos	Netherlands	10.706	10.633		Q
2	2	Roberto Chiappa	Italy				
3	1	Craig MacLean	Great Britain		10.874	10.669	Q
3	2	Ross Edgar	Great Britain	10.678			
4	1	Grégory Baugé	France	10.553	10.922		Q
4	2	Maximilian Levy	Germany				

== Race for 5th to 8th places ==
Rank	Name	Nation	200m time	Speed (km/h)
5	Maximilian Levy	Germany	11.474	62.750
6	Stefan Nimke	Germany		
7	Roberto Chiappa	Italy		
8	Ross Edgar	Great Britain		

== Semifinals ==
Heat	Rank	Name	Nation	1st race	2nd race	Decider	Q
1	1	Grégory Baugé	France	10.555		10.608	Q
1	2	Mickaël Bourgain	France		10.535		
2	1	Theo Bos	Netherlands	10.966	10.476		Q
2	2	Craig MacLean	Great Britain				

== Finals ==
Rank	Name	Nation	1st race	2nd race	Decider
Gold medal race
1st place, gold medalist(s)	Theo Bos	Netherlands	10.400	10.606	
2nd place, silver medalist(s)	Grégory Baugé	France			
Bronze medal race
3rd place, bronze medalist(s)	Mickaël Bourgain	France	10.765	10.493	
4	Craig MacLean	Great Britain			
