= 2013 UCI Track Cycling World Championships – Men's sprint =

Men's sprint at the 2013 UCI Track Cycling World Championships
- Venue: Minsk-Arena, Minsk, Belarus
- Date: 23–24 February 2013
- Competitors: 41 from 18 nations

Medalists
gold medal	Stefan Bötticher	Germany
silver medal	Denis Dmitriev	Russia
bronze medal	François Pervis	France

Rainbow jersey

The Men's sprint at the 2013 UCI Track Cycling World Championships was held on February 23–24. 41 cyclists participated in the contest.

== Results ==
=== Qualifying ===
The qualifying was held at 13:00.

Rank	Name	Nation	Time	Notes
1	François Pervis	France	9.879	Q
2	Robert Förstemann	Germany	9.924	Q
3	Sam Webster	New Zealand	9.958	Q
4	Maximilian Levy	Germany	9.971	Q
5	Denis Dmitriev	Russia	10.002	Q
6	Stefan Bötticher	Germany	10.008	Q
7	Jason Kenny	Great Britain	10.048	Q
8	Matthew Glaetzer	Australia	10.056	Q
9	Mitchell Bullen	Australia	10.075	Q
10	Juan Peralta	Spain	10.095	Q
11	Simon van Velthooven	New Zealand	10.103	Q
12	Bernard Esterhuizen	South Africa	10.128	Q
13	Quentin Lafargue	France	10.136	Q
14	Andrew Taylor	Australia	10.143	Q
15	Nikita Shurshin	Russia	10.145	Q
16	Seiichiro Nakagawa	Japan	10.159	Q
17	Ethan Mitchell	New Zealand	10.164	Q
18	Pavel Kelemen	Czech Republic	10.190	Q
19	Philip Hindes	Great Britain	10.195	Q
20	Scott Sunderland	Australia	10.200	Q
21	Fabián Puerta	Colombia	10.233	Q
22	Charlie Conord	France	10.238	Q
23	Matthew Crampton	Great Britain	10.280	Q
24	Tomoyuki Kawabata	Japan	10.283	Q
25	Valentin Savitskiy	Russia	10.310	
26	Kazunari Watanabe	Japan	10.312	
27	Eoin Mullen	Ireland	10.329	
28	Zhang Lei	China	10.341	
29	Hodei Mazquiarán	Spain	10.347	
30	Denis Shurshin	Russia	10.360	
31	Zhang Miao	China	10.366	
32	Damian Zieliński	Poland	10.394	
33	Matthijs Büchli	Netherlands	10.404	
34	Adam Ptáčník	Czech Republic	10.407	
35	Jeffrey Hoogland	Netherlands	10.412	
36	Krzysztof Maksel	Poland	10.447	
37	Sergio Aliaga Chivite	Spain	10.448	
38	Sotirios Bretas	Greece	10.460	
39	Robin Wagner	Czech Republic	10.509	
40	Jair Tjon En Fa	Suriname	10.560	
41	Francesco Ceci	Italy	10.658	

=== Finals ===
==== 1/16 Finals ====
The 1/16 Finals were held at 15:00.

Heat	Rank	Name	Nation	Gap	Notes
1	1	François Pervis	France		Q
1	2	Tomoyuki Kawabata	Japan	+0.052	
2	1	Matthew Crampton	Great Britain		Q
2	2	Robert Förstemann	Germany	+0.035	
3	1	Sam Webster	New Zealand		Q
3	2	Charlie Conord	France	+0.898	
4	1	Maximilian Levy	Germany		Q
4	2	Fabián Puerta	Colombia	+0.063	
5	1	Denis Dmitriev	Russia		Q
5	2	Scott Sunderland	Australia	+0.285	
6	1	Stefan Bötticher	Germany		Q
6	2	Philip Hindes	Great Britain	+0.066	
7	1	Jason Kenny	Great Britain		Q
7	2	Pavel Kelemen	Czech Republic	+0.148	
8	1	Matthew Glaetzer	Australia		Q
8	2	Ethan Mitchell	New Zealand	+0.080	
9	1	Mitchell Bullen	Australia		Q
9	2	Seiichiro Nakagawa	Japan	+0.029	
10	1	Juan Peralta	Spain		Q
10	2	Nikita Shurshin	Russia	+0.388	
11	1	Simon van Velthooven	New Zealand		Q
11	2	Andrew Taylor	Australia	+0.117	
12	1	Bernard Esterhuizen	South Africa		Q
12	2	Quentin Lafargue	France	+0.063	

==== 1/8 Finals ====
The 1/8 Finals were held at 16:15.

Heat	Rank	Name	Nation	Gap	Notes
1	1	François Pervis	France		Q
1	2	Bernard Esterhuizen	South Africa	+0.053	
2	1	Simon van Velthooven	New Zealand		Q
2	2	Matthew Crampton	Great Britain	+0.179	
3	1	Sam Webster	New Zealand		Q
3	2	Juan Peralta	Spain	+0.082	
4	1	Maximilian Levy	Germany		Q
4	2	Mitchell Bullen	Australia	+0.113	
5	1	Denis Dmitriev	Russia		Q
5	2	Matthew Glaetzer	Australia	+0.033	
6	1	Jason Kenny	Great Britain		Q
6	2	Stefan Bötticher	Germany	+0.008	

===== Repechage =====
The 1/8 Finals repechages were held at 17:10.

Heat	Rank	Name	Nation	Gap	Notes
1	1	Stefan Bötticher	Germany		Q
1	2	Mitchell Bullen	Australia	+0.027	
1	3	Bernard Esterhuizen	South Africa	+0.184	
2	1	Matthew Glaetzer	Australia		Q
2	2	Juan Peralta	Spain	+0.247	
2	3	Matthew Crampton	Great Britain	+0.303	

==== Quarterfinals ====
The Quarterfinals were held at 19:00.

Heat	Rank	Name	Nation	Race 1	Race 2	Decider	Notes
1	1	François Pervis	France	X	X		Q
1	2	Matthew Glaetzer	Australia	+0.037	+0.027		
2	1	Stefan Bötticher	Germany	X	+0.035	X	Q
2	2	Simon van Velthooven	New Zealand	+0.036	X	+0.562	
3	1	Sam Webster	New Zealand	X	X		Q
3	2	Jason Kenny	Great Britain	+0.027	+0.062		
4	1	Denis Dmitriev	Russia	X	X		Q
4	2	Maximilian Levy	Germany	+0.010	+0.013		

==== Race for 5th–8th Places ====
The race for 5th–8th places was held at 21:40.

Rank	Name	Nation	Gap
5	Matthew Glaetzer	Australia	
6	Maximilian Levy	Germany	+0.069
7	Jason Kenny	Great Britain	+0.090
8	Simon van Velthooven	New Zealand	+0.122

==== Semifinals ====
The Semifinals were held at 10:50.

Heat	Rank	Name	Nation	Race 1	Race 2	Decider	Notes
1	1	Denis Dmitriev	Russia	X	+0.010	X	Q
1	2	François Pervis	France	+0.033	X	+0.021	
2	1	Stefan Bötticher	Germany	+0.023	X	X	Q
2	2	Sam Webster	New Zealand	X	+0.008	+1.377	

==== Finals ====
The Finals were held at 14:00.

===== Small Final =====
Rank	Name	Nation	Race 1	Race 2	Decider	Notes
3rd place, bronze medalist(s)	François Pervis	France	X	X		
4	Sam Webster	New Zealand	+0.041	+0.350		

===== Final =====
Rank	Name	Nation	Race 1	Race 2	Decider	Notes
1st place, gold medalist(s)	Stefan Bötticher	Germany	X	X		
2nd place, silver medalist(s)	Denis Dmitriev	Russia	+0.021	+0.008		
