= Jobie Dajka =

Australian cyclist (1981–2009)

Personal information
- Full name: Jobie Lee Dajka
- Nickname: Wheels
- Born: 11 December 1981 Adelaide, South Australia, Australia
- Died: 4 April 2009 (aged 27)

Cycling career
- Sport: Cycling
- Discipline: Track
- Role: Rider
- Rider type: Sprinter

Major wins
- Keirin world champion (2002)
Medal record
Representing Australia
Men's track cycling
Commonwealth Games
Gold medal – first place	2002 Manchester	Team Sprint
Bronze medal – third place	2002 Manchester	Sprint
World Championship
Gold medal – first place	2002 Ballerup	Keirin
Silver medal – second place	2001 Antwerp	Team Sprint
Silver medal – second place	2002 Ballerup	Team Sprint
Silver medal – second place	2002 Ballerup	Sprint
Silver medal – second place	2003 Stuttgart	Sprint
Silver medal – second place	2003 Stuttgart	Keirin
Bronze medal – third place	2005 Los Angeles	Sprint

Jobie Lee Dajka (11 December 1981 – 4 April 2009) was an Australian professional track cyclist from Adelaide, South Australia.

== Biography ==
Dajka received an AIS Junior Athlete of the Year award in 1999, and an Achievement Award in 2002 and 2003. He missed selection for the 2000 Olympic Games, but competed in the 2002 UCI Track Cycling World Championships, winning the Keirin.

Dajka was sent home from the 2004 pre-Olympic training camp, accused of having lied to the enquiries into the Mark French doping affair. His appeal at his expulsion and later suspension was unsuccessful. After this, he became disillusioned and became a very heavy drinker, and gained a lot of weight. Following a tribunal on 15 June 2005, he received a three-year ban following an assault on Martin Barras, the Australian national track coach. He also vandalised his parents' home and was put under a restraining order. After suffering emotional and mental problems, Dajka had a brief stay in an Adelaide hospital suffering depression and alcohol-related stress. Dajka's racing licence was reinstated on 22 December 2006; his ban was lifted early in accordance with conditions set out in the 2005 tribunal- that he sought immediate medical treatment and completed 80 hours of community service.

Dajka later regained his normal health and stopped drinking, and there was talk of a comeback. However, Dajka was found dead in his home by police on 7 April 2009. The cause of his death is unknown, but police said the death is not believed to be suspicious.

== Palmarès ==
1998
2nd Team Sprint, World Juniors Track Cycling Championships

1999
3rd Kilo, World Juniors Track Cycling Championships
1st Sprint, World Juniors Track Cycling Championships
1st Team Sprint, World Juniors Track Cycling Championships (with Ben Kersten & Mark Renshaw)

2001
2nd Team Sprint, UCI Track Cycling World Championships (with Sean Eadie & Ryan Bayley)
1st Keirin, 2001 Track World Cup, Ipoh

2002
1st Team Sprint, 2002 Commonwealth Games (with Sean Eadie & Ryan Bayley)
1st Keirin, UCI Track Cycling World Championships
2nd Sprint, UCI Track Cycling World Championships
2nd Team Sprint, UCI Track Cycling World Championships (with Sean Eadie & Ryan Bayley)
3rd Sprint, 2002 Commonwealth Games

2003
2nd Sprint, UCI Track Cycling World Championships
2nd Keirin, UCI Track Cycling World Championships

2004
2nd Keirin, 2004 Track World Cup, Moscow
3rd Keirin, 2004 Track World Cup, Sydney

2005
3rd Sprint, UCI Track Cycling World Championships
1st (Australia) Sprint, Australian National Track Championships
3rd Keirin, Australian National Track Championships
2nd Sprint, 2004–2005 Track World Cup, Sydney
3rd Team Sprint, 2004–2005 Track World Cup, Sydney
