= 2004–05 UCI Track Cycling World Cup Classics =

The 2004–2005 UCI Track Cycling World Cup Classics is a multi race tournament over a season of track cycling. The season ran from 5 November 2004 to 20 February 2005. The World Cup is organised by the UCI.

== Results ==
=== Men ===
Event	Winner	Second	Third
Russia, Moscow — November 5–7, 2004
Keirin	Sergiy Ruban (RUS)	Grégory Baugé (FRA)	Ivan Vrba (CZE)
1 km time trial	Jason Queally (GBR)	Sören Lausberg (GER)	Alois Kaňkovský (CZE)
Scratch	James Carney (USA)	Geraint Thomas (GBR)	Matthew Gilmore (BEL)
Individual pursuit	Volodymyr Dyudya (UKR)	Robert Hayles (GBR)	Jens Mouris (NED)
Team pursuit	Ukraine; Volodymyr Dyudya; Roman Kononenko; Vitaliy Popkov; Volodymyr Zagorodniy	Netherlands; Jens Mouris; Peter Schep; Wim Stroetinga; Niki Terpstra	Russia; Serguei Klimov; Anton Mindlin; Alexander Serov; Nikolai Trussov
Sprint	Sergiy Ruban (RUS)	Grégory Baugé (FRA)	Teun Mulder (NED)
Points race	Peter Schep (NED)	Petr Lazar (CZE)	Luis Fernando Sepúlveda (CHI)
Team sprint	Germany; Sören Lausberg; Michael Seidenbecher; Jan van Eijden	France; Grégory Baugé; Hervé Gane; Matthieu Mandard	Russia; Dmitriy Leopold; Sergey Polynskiy; Sergiy Ruban
Madison	Belgium; Matthew Gilmore; Iljo Keisse	Czech Republic; Martin Bláha; Petr Lazar	Slovakia; Martin Liška; Jozef Žabka
United States, Los Angeles — December 10–12, 2004
Keirin	Teun Mulder (NED)	Arnaud Tournant (FRA)	José Antonio Villanueva (ESP)
1 km time trial	Theo Bos (NED)	Jason Queally (GBR)	Ben Kersten (AUS)
Scratch	Alex Rasmussen (DEN)	Siarhei Daubniuk (BLR)	José Medina (CHI)
Individual pursuit	Robert Bartko (GER)	Mikhail Ignatiev (RUS)	Sergio Escobar Roure (ESP)
Team pursuit	Germany; Robert Bartko; Robert Bengsch; Henning Bommel; Leif Lampater	New Zealand; Jason Allen; Timothy Gudsell; Peter Latham; Marc Ryan	Ukraine; Volodymyr Dyudya; Roman Kononenko; Lyubomyr Polatayko; Volodymyr Zagorodniy
Sprint	Mickaël Bourgain (FRA)	Arnaud Tournant (FRA)	Kazuya Narita (JPN)
Points race	Mikhail Ignatiev (RUS)	Colby Pearce (USA)	Chris Newton (GBR)
Team sprint	Netherlands; Theo Bos; Teun Mulder; Tim Veldt	Germany; Carsten Bergemann; Matthias John; Stefan Nimke	France; Mickaël Bourgain; Didier Henriette; Arnaud Tournant
Madison	Germany; Robert Bartko; Leif Lampater	Czech Republic; Martin Bláha; Petr Lazar	Russia; Mikhail Ignatiev; Nikolai Trussov
United Kingdom, Manchester — January 7–9, 2005
Keirin	René Wolff (GER)	Mickaël Bourgain (FRA)	Shane John Kelly (AUS)
1 km time trial	Chris Hoy (GBR)	Ben Kersten (AUS)	Stefan Nimke (GER)
Scratch	Jérôme Neuville (FRA)	Volodymyr Rybin (UKR)	Ioannis Tamouridis (GRE)
Individual pursuit	Sergio Escobar Roure (ESP)	Robert Hayles (GBR)	Levi Heimans (NED)
Team pursuit	United Kingdom; Steven Cummings; Robert Hayles; Paul Manning; Chris Newton	Spain; Carlos Castaño Panadero; Guillermo Ferrer Garcia; Asier Maeztu; Carlos Torrent Tarres	Germany; Christian Bach; Robert Bengsch; Henning Bommel; Leif Lampater
Sprint	Mickaël Bourgain (FRA)	Łukasz Kwiatkowski (POL)	José Antonio Villanueva (ESP)
Points race	Vasil Kiryienka (BLR)	Nikita Eskov (RUS)	Colby Pearce (USA)
Team sprint	United Kingdom; Chris Hoy; Craig MacLean; Jason Queally	Poland; Rafa Furman; Łukasz Kwiatkowski; Damian Zieliński	Japan; Kazuya Narita; Yusho Oikawa; Kazunari Watanabe
Madison	France; Andy Flickinger; Jérôme Neuville	Belgium; Kenny De Ketele; Wouter Van Mechelen	Germany; Leif Lampater; Andreas Müller
Australia, Sydney — February 18–20, 2005
Keirin	Theo Bos (NED)	Laurent Gané (FRA)	Pavel Buráň (CZE)
1 km time trial	Ben Kersten (AUS)	Tim Veldt (NED)	François Pervis (FRA)
Scratch	Wim Stroetinga (NED)	Alex Rasmussen (DEN)	Gregory Henderson (NZL)
Individual pursuit	Levi Heimans (NED)	Ed Clancy (GBR)	Ivan Kovalev (RUS)
Team pursuit	New Zealand; Jason Allen; Hayden Godfrey; Gregory Henderson; Marc Ryan	United Kingdom; Matthew Brammeier; Mark Cavendish; Ed Clancy; Tom White	Australia; Richard England; Sean Finning; Matthew Harley Goss; Miles Olman
Sprint	Theo Bos (NED)	Jobie Dajka (AUS)	Arnaud Tournant (FRA)
Points race	Volodymyr Rybin (UKR)	Ioannis Tamouridis (GRE)	Sean Finning (AUS)
Team sprint	France; Grégory Baugé; François Pervis; Arnaud Tournant	Japan; Kazuya Narita; Yusho Oikawa; Kazunari Watanabe	Australia; Jobie Dajka; Joel Leonard; Ben Kersten
Madison	Ukraine; Dmytro Grabovskyy; Volodymyr Rybin	Denmark; Michael Mørkøv; Alex Rasmussen	United Kingdom; Mark Cavendish; Tom White

=== Women ===
Event	Winner	Second	Third
Russia, Moscow — November 5–7, 2004
Keirin	Susan Panzer (GER)	Tamilla Abassova (RUS)	Christin Muche (GER)
500 m time trial	Tamilla Abassova (RUS)	Yvonne Hijgenaar (NED)	Elisa Frisoni (ITA)
Scratch	Apollinaria Bakova (RUS)	Oxana Kostenko (RUS)	Annalisa Cucinotta (ITA)
Individual pursuit	Oxana Kostenko (RUS)	Lyudmyla Vypyraylo (UKR)	Marlijn Binnendijk (NED)
Sprint	Tamilla Abassova (RUS)	Chian Fang (CHN)	Christin Muche (GER)
Points race	Lyudmyla Vypyraylo (UKR)	Rebecca Bertolo (ITA)	Apollinaria Bakova (RUS)
United States, Los Angeles — December 10–12, 2004
Keirin	Victoria Pendleton (GBR)	Anna Meares (AUS)	Natallia Tsylinskaya (BLR)
500 m time trial	Natallia Tsylinskaya (BLR)	Elisa Frisoni (ITA)	Yvonne Hijgenaar (NED)
Scratch	Yulia Arustamova (RUS)	Eleonora Soldo (ITA)	Emma Davies (GBR)
Individual pursuit	Katie Mactier (AUS)	Emma Davies (GBR)	Elena Tchalykh (RUS)
Sprint	Natallia Tsylinskaya (BLR)	Tamilla Abassova (RUS)	Elisa Frisoni (ITA)
Points race	Erin Mirabella (USA)	Alexis Rhodes (AUS)	Adrie Visser (NED)
United Kingdom, Manchester — January 7–9, 2005
Keirin	Natallia Tsylinskaya (BLR)	Susan Panzer (GER)	Jennie Reed (USA)
500 m time trial	Tamilla Abassova (RUS)	Victoria Pendleton (GBR)	Elisa Frisoni (ITA)
Scratch	Katherine Bates (AUS)	Rebecca Quinn (USA)	Virginie Moinard (FRA)
Individual pursuit	Katherine Bates (AUS)	Emma Davies (GBR)	Karin Thürig (SUI)
Sprint	Christin Muche (GER)	Victoria Pendleton (GBR)	Tamila Abassova (RUS)
Points race	Katherine Bates (AUS)	Vera Carrara (ITA)	Alexis Rhodes (AUS)
Australia, Sydney — February 18–20, 2005
Keirin	Anna Meares (AUS)	Guo Shuang (CHN)	Jennie Reed (USA)
500 m time trial	Yvonne Hijgenaar (NED)	Elisa Frisoni (ITA)	Lori-Ann Muenzer (CAN)
Scratch	Annalisa Cucinotta (ITA)	Katherine Bates (AUS)	Catherine Sell (NZL)
Individual pursuit	Marlijn Binnendijk (NED)	Dales Tye (NZL)	Tatsiana Sharakova (BLR)
Sprint	Anna Meares (AUS)	Guo Shuang (CHN)	Yvonne Hijgenaar (NED)
Points race	Rochelle Gilmore (AUS)	Giorgia Bronzini (ITA)	Yun Mei Wu (CHN)
