= Phillip Thuaux =

Australian racing cyclist

Personal information
- Full name: Phillip Thuaux
- Born: 9 July 1979 (age 47) Point Clare, New South Wales, Australia

Cycling career
- Sport: Cycling
- Current team: Drapac-Porsche
- Disciplines: Road, track
- Role: Rider
- Rider type: Pursuitest

Professional teams
- 2003–2004: Team Down Under-Cyclingnews.com
- 2005: Wismilak Cycling Team
- 2006–: Drapac Porsche

Phillip Thuaux (born 9 July 1979) is an Australian professional racing cyclist.

== Palmarès ==
2001
1st, Tour of the Tamar

2002
3rd, Overall, Canberra Tour

1st, Stage 1
1st, Stage 3

2nd, Overall, Tour of South China Sea

3rd, Stage 1
1st, Stage 2

2004
1st, Drie Zustersteden
2nd, Overall, Tour de Hongrie

1st, Stage 2

2005
Oceania Games
2nd, Road race

2006
2006–2007 World Cup

3rd, Pursuit, Sydney

Oceania Games, Melbourne

1st, Team Pursuit (with Zachary Dempster, Hayden Josefski and Stephen Rossendell)

2007
National Track Championships, Sydney

1st, Pursuit
2nd, Team Pursuit

Oceania Championships, Invercargill

1st, Pursuit
1st, Team Pursuit (with Mark Jamieson, Cameron Meyer and Travis Meyer)

2007–2008 World Cup

2nd, Pursuit, Sydney
