= Katherine Bates =

Australian racing cyclist

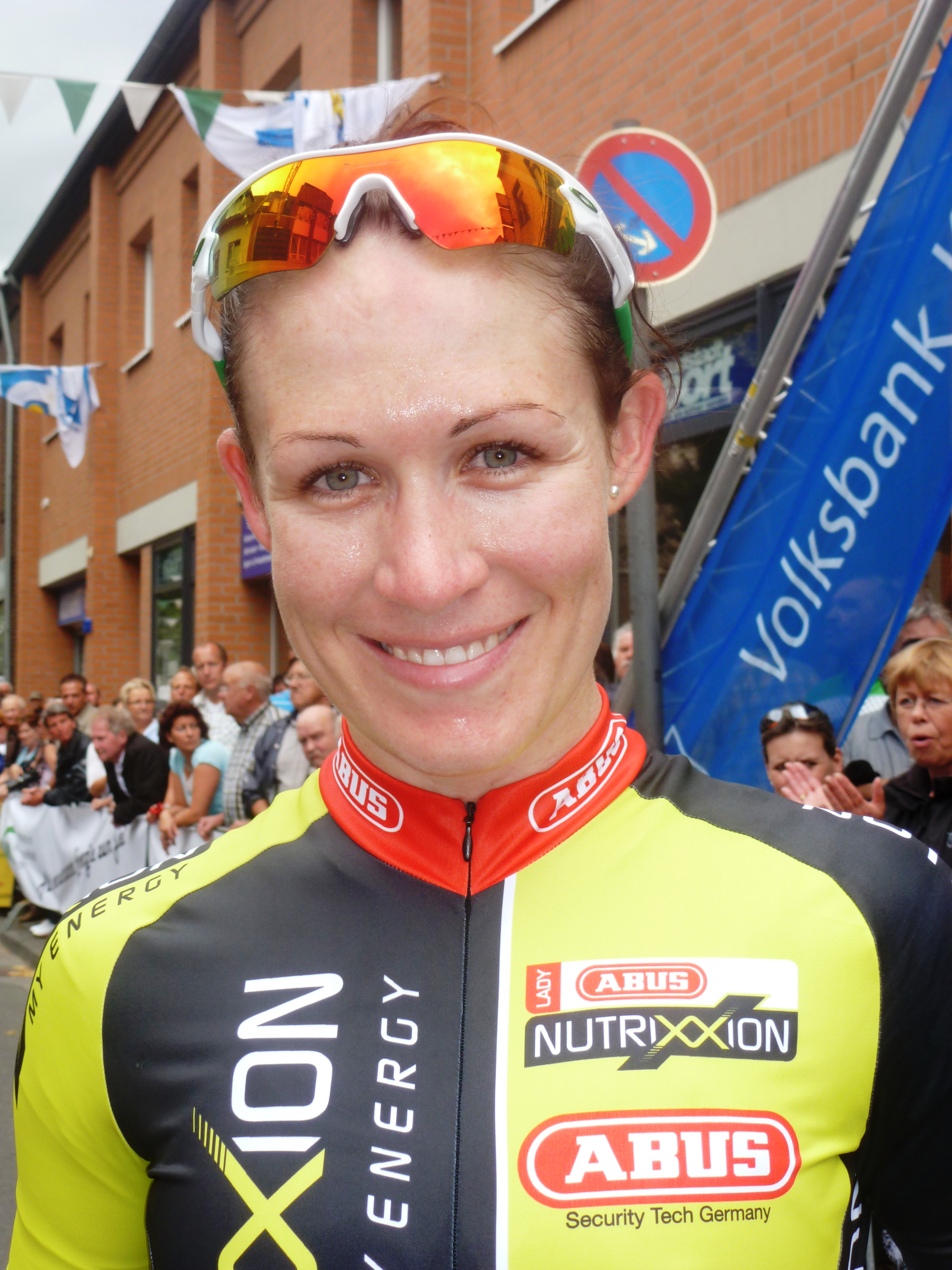
- Katherine Bates (2011)

Personal information
- Nickname: "Kate" "Katey"
- Born: 18 May 1982 (age 44) Sydney, Australia
- Height: 176 cm (5 ft 9 in)

Cycling career
- Sport: Cycling
- Disciplines: Track & Road
- Role: Rider
- Rider type: Track endurance, road sprint.

Professional teams
- 2002: Ondernemers van Nature
- 2003: Bik–Powerplate
- 2004: Team Ton Van Bemmelen Sports
- 2005: Van Bemmelen–AA Drink
- 2006: Equipe Nürnberger Versicherung
- 2007: T-Mobile Women
- 2010: Team Colavita Baci
- 2011: Abus – Nutrixxion

Major wins
- World Points Race Champion 2007 Australian Road Race Champion 2006 Commonwealth Games Champion 2002, 2006
Medal record
Women's track cycling
Representing Australia
Commonwealth Games
Gold medal – first place	2002 Manchester	Points Race
Gold medal – first place	2006 Melbourne	Points Race
Silver medal – second place	2002 Manchester	Individual Pursuit
Silver medal – second place	2006 Melbourne	Individual Pursuit
World Championship
Gold medal – first place	2007 Palma de Mallorca	Points Race
Silver medal – second place	2001 Antwerp	Points Race
Silver medal – second place	2005 Los Angeles	Scratch Race
Silver medal – second place	2005 Los Angeles	Individual Pursuit
Silver medal – second place	2011 Apeldoorn	Scratch
Bronze medal – third place	2002 Copenhagen	Individual Pursuit
Bronze medal – third place	2005 Los Angeles	Points Race
Oceania Championships
Gold medal – first place	2011 Adelaide	Scratch race
Gold medal – first place	2011 Adelaide	Team pursuit

Katherine (Katey) Linsey Bates (born 18 May 1982 in Sydney) is an Australian former track and road cyclist. A multiple national champion, Bates rode as a professional since 2002. Her career highlights included Australian Road Race Champion in 2006, World Points Race Champion in 2007 and Commonwealth Games champion in 2002 and 2006.

Bates competed in both track and road at the Olympic Games, finishing fourth in the individual pursuit at the 2004 Summer Olympics and sixth in the points race at the 2008 Summer Olympics. Bates retired in December 2011 due to injury.

Her sister, Natalie Bates, was also a professional racing cyclist.

She now co-runs Chicks Who Rides Bikes, a women's cycling organisation which supports women at all levels of cycling as well as working as a freelance television commentator and host. She has covered World Championships, Olympic Games, Tour de France and other National and World Tour cycling events for Network 7 and SBS Australia, where she hosts Tour de France preview show, Bonjour Le Tour.

She co-hosts The Wheelhouse cycling podcast with Australian sports journalist Joel Spreadborough.

Her spouse, Luke Miers, is a Walkley Award-winning camera-operator.

== Palmarès ==
2000
2nd World Time Trial Championships, Plouay – Junior

2001
2nd Points Race, World Track Championships, Antwerp
3rd Amstel Gold Race Netherlands

2002
3rd Individual Pursuit, World Track Championships, Copenhagen
1st Points Race, Commonwealth Games, Manchester
2nd Individual Pursuit, Commonwealth Games, Manchester

2003
1st Individual Pursuit, World Cup, Moscow
1st Overall, Geelong Tour, Australia
2nd Australian Criterium Championships, Victoria

2004
4th Individual Pursuit, 2004 Summer Olympics
1st Stage 2, Vuelta a Castilla y León, Zamora
1st Individual Pursuit, World Cup, Manchester
1st Points Race, World Cup, Manchester
2nd Stage 2, Geelong Tour, Australia
3rd overall, Geelong Tour, Australia

2005
1st Points Race, World Cup, Manchester
1st Individual Pursuit, World Cup, Manchester
1st Scratch Race, World Cup, Manchester
1st (Australia) Individual Pursuit, Australian National Track Championships, Adelaide
1st (Australia) Points Race, Australian National Track Championships, Adelaide
1st (Australia) Scratch Race, Australian National Track Championships, Adelaide
2nd Individual Pursuit, World Track Championships, Los Angeles
2nd Scratch Race, World Track Championships, Los Angeles
3rd Points Race, World Track Championships, Los Angeles

2006 (Equipe Nürnberger Versicherung)
1st Australian National Road Race Championships, Mount Torrens
1st (Australia) Scratch Race, Australian National Track Championships, Adelaide
1st (Australia) Points Race, Australian National Track Championships, Adelaide
2nd Individual Pursuit, Australian National Track Championships, Adelaide
1st Points Race, Commonwealth Games, Melbourne – defeated teammate Rochelle Gilmore
2nd Individual Pursuit, Commonwealth Games, Melbourne
1st Stage 3, Tour du Grand Montréal, Canada
1st Stage 4, Euregio Ladies Tour, Bilzen
1st Stage 5, Bay Classic, Docklands
1st Points Race, World Cup, Sydney
1st Stage 1, Tri-Peaks Challenge USA
1st Individual Pursuit Track World Cup, United Kingdom
2nd Scratch Race Track World Cup, United Kingdom
3rd Women's Road World Cup Geelong, Australia

2007
1st Stage 1, 1st Stage 5 & 1st Final GC Bay Classic
1st Points Race, World Track Championships, Palma de Mallorca
3rd Points Race, Track World Cup, Beijing
3rd Overall, Tour du Grand Montréal, Canada
3rd Stage 1, International Thüringen Rundfahrt, Germany
3rd Australian Criterium Championship, Queensland

2008
6th Points race, 2008 Summer Olympics

2009 INJURED – (Team Columbia–HTC 2009 season)

2010
1st Scratch Race, Oceania Track Cycling Championships, Adelaide
1st Women's Team Pursuit, Oceania Track Cycling Championships, Adelaide
1st Women's Team Pursuit, Track World Cup, Melbourne

2011
2nd Women's scratch, 2011 UCI Track Cycling World Championships, Apeldoorn
