= Sean Eadie =

Australian cyclist (born 1969)

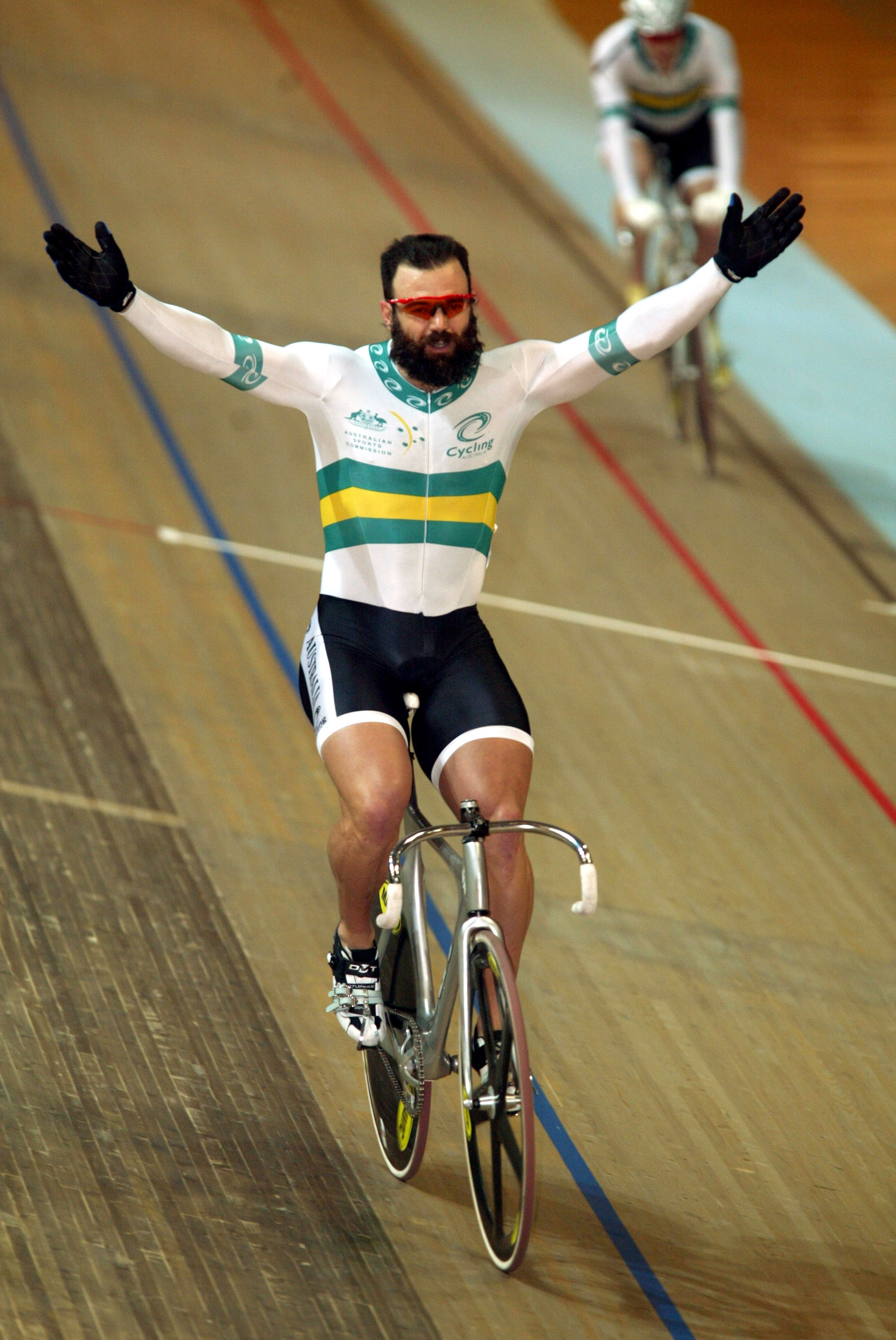
- Eadie in 2002

Personal information
- Full name: Sean Eadie
- Born: 15 April 1969 (age 57) Sydney, Australia
- Height: 1.83 m (6 ft 0 in)
- Weight: 98 kg (216 lb; 15.4 st)

Cycling career
- Sport: Cycling
- Discipline: Track
- Role: Rider
- Rider type: Sprinter

Amateur team
- Bankstown Sports CC

Major wins
- Sprint world champion (2002)
Medal record
Representing Australia
Men's track cycling
Olympic Games
Bronze medal – third place	2000 Sydney	Team Sprint
Commonwealth Games
Gold medal – first place	2002 Manchester	Team Sprint
Silver medal – second place	2002 Manchester	Sprint
Silver medal – second place	1998 Kuala Lumpur	Sprint
World Championship
Gold medal – first place	2002 Copenhagen	Sprint
Silver medal – second place	2001 Antwerp	Team Sprint
Silver medal – second place	2002 Copenhagen	Team Sprint
Bronze medal – third place	1997 Perth	Team Sprint

Sean Eadie (born 15 April 1969) is a retired professional track cyclist. He lives in Como, New South Wales. He started cycling at 10 and became a professional in 1990. Despite competitive aggression on the track, he is a "gentle giant" off the track. Prior to becoming a full-time cyclist, Eadie was a kindergarten teacher. He was awarded a Diploma of Teaching (Primary) from the Australian Catholic University.

In 2002 Eadie broke the Commonwealth Games record for a flying 200m in 10.145 on his way to winning silver in the sprint.

Eadie competed in the 2004 Olympic Games in Athens following controversy. He was cleared by the Court of Arbitration for Sport, after insufficient evidence, of allegations that he had tried to import human growth hormone. A package containing Peptides was sent to Eadie from San Diego. It was intercepted by customs officers. At the hearing, Eadie said that he did not know who had sent the package and that checks of his credit-card records would show no link. Eadie has never failed a drugs test.

Eadie is known for his large beard, which earned him many nicknames, including Captain Haddock. In an interview with Cyclingnews.com's Lucy Power, he was asked if it was counter-aerodynamic to shave his legs but not his face. He said he had "won the team sprint and went 10.14 in Manchester, won the world's - wasn't too counter productive!" He said he shaved his legs "because it feels great in bed".

== Palmarès ==
1995
1st Sprint, Oceania Titles, QLD
2nd Keirin, Oceania Titles, QLD
2nd Sprint, Australian National Track Championships
4th Time Trial, Oceania Titles, QLD

1996
2nd Team Sprint, Australian National Track Championships
3rd Sprint, World Cup, COL
3rd Sprint, Australian National Track Championships

1997
3rd Team Sprint, UCI Track Cycling World Championships (with Danny Day & Shane Kelly)
1st Team Sprint, World Cup, AUS
1st Team Sprint, Australian National Track Championships
2nd Sprint, Australian National Track Championships
3rd Sprint, World Cup, RSA
3rd Team Sprint, World Cup, COL
4th Keirin, Australian National Track Championships

1998
2nd Sprint, Commonwealth Games
2nd Sprint, World Cup, FRA
2nd Flying 200m, Australian National Track Championships
3rd Team Sprint, Australian National Track Championships

1999
2nd Team Sprint, Oceania International Grand Prix, NSW
3rd Sprint, Oceania International Grand Prix, NSW
3rd Sprint, Australian National Track Championships
3rd Keirin, Australian National Track Championships
4th Flying 200m, Australian National Track Championships

2000
3rd Team Sprint, Olympic Games (with Gary Neiwand & Darryn Hill)
1st Flying 200m, Australian National Track Championships
1st Team Sprint, Australian National Track Championships
1st Sprint, Australian National Track Championships
1st Sprint, Qantas Cup NSW
2nd Flying 200m, Qantas Cup NSW
4th Sprint, World Cup, COL
Geo Adam Trophy - Ride of the Series Australian Track Titles

2001
2nd Team Sprint, UCI Track Cycling World Championships (with Jobie Dajka & Ryan Bayley)
1st Sprint, Goodwill Games AUS
1st Team Sprint, Oceania Titles AUS
2nd Team Sprint, Australian National Track Championships
2nd Keirin, Australian National Track Championships
3rd Keirin, Goodwill Games AUS
3rd Sprint, Oceania Titles AUS
3rd Flying 200m, Australian National Track Championships
3rd Sprint, Australian National Track Championships
4th Team Sprint, World Cup, COL

2002
1st Team Sprint, 2002 Commonwealth Games (with Jobie Dajka & Ryan Bayley)
1st Sprint, UCI Track Cycling World Championships
2nd Team Sprint, UCI Track Cycling World Championships (with Jobie Dajka & Ryan Bayley)
2nd Sprint, 2002 Commonwealth Games Games Record 10.145sec
1st Keirin, World Cup, AUS
1st Sprint, World Cup, AUS
1st Flying 200m, Australian National Track Championships
1st Sprint, Australian National Track Championships
1st Team Sprint, Australian National Track Championships
2nd Team Sprint, World Cup, RUS
2nd Keirin, Australian National Track Championships

2004
1st Sprint, Australian National Track Championships
1st 1 lap Time Trial, Australian National Track Championships
4th Team Sprint, Olympic Games

2005
1st Sprint, Oceania Titles AUS
