= Helen Kelly (cyclist) =

Australian cyclist

Personal information
- Born: 7 August 1971 (age 55) Australia

Cycling career
- Sport: Cycling
- Disciplines: Road cycling and track cycling

Professional teams
- 2008: Team Tibco
- 2013: Team TIBCO-To The Top

Helen Kelly (born 7 August 1971) is a track and road cyclist from Australia. She represented her nation at the 2005 and 2006 UCI Road World Championships.
