= Mitchell Lovelock-Fay =

Australian cyclist

Personal information
- Born: 12 January 1992 (age 34) Canberra, Australia

Cycling career
- Sport: Cycling
- Current team: Avanti Racing Team
- Discipline: Road
- Role: Rider

Amateur team
- 2012: Ricoh

Professional teams
- 2011: Team Jayco–AIS
- 2013: Christina Watches–Onfone
- 2014-: Avanti Racing Team

Mitchell Lovelock-Fay (born 12 January 1992 in Canberra) is an Australian cyclist riding for the Avanti Racing Team.

== Palmares ==
2012
1st Tour of Thailand

1st stage 2

2014
1st stage 3 Tour of Toowoomba (TTT)
1st Tour of Southland

1st Prologue (TTT) and stage 4

3rd Tour de Perth
