= Travis Meyer (cyclist) =

Australian cyclist (born 1989)

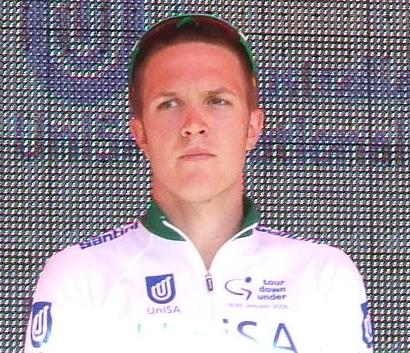
- Meyer at the 2009 Tour Down Under

Personal information
- Full name: Travis Meyer
- Born: 8 June 1989 (age 37) Viveash, Australia

Cycling career
- Sport: Cycling
- Current team: Retired
- Disciplines: Road; Track
- Role: Rider
- Rider type: Time trialist

Amateur team
- 2008–2009: Southaustralia.com–AIS

Professional teams
- 2010–2011: Garmin–Transitions
- 2012–2013: GreenEDGE
- 2014–2016: Drapac Professional Cycling

Major wins
- National Road Race Championships (2010)

Travis Meyer (born 8 June 1989 in Viveash) is an Australian former professional racing cyclist, who rode professionally between 2010 and 2016. His first Pro Tour race was the 2009 Tour Down Under. At the beginning of 2010 he was the winner of the Australian National Road Race Championships elite road race.

== Personal life ==
His brother Cameron Meyer is also a cyclist, and rode with Travis at Orica–GreenEDGE in 2012 and 2013.

== Major results ==
2006
UCI Junior Track World Championships

1st Madison
1st Team pursuit

2007
UCI Juniors World Championships

1st Individual pursuit
1st Scratch
1st Team pursuit
10th Road race

2008
1st Overall Tour de Berlin
1st Overall Tour of Wellington

1st Stages 3 & 7

3rd Time trial, National Under-23 Road Championships
7th Overall Ronde de l'Isard
2009
1st Team pursuit, National Track Championships
1st Overall Tour de Perth
2nd Time trial, National Under-23 Road Championships
10th Overall Tour of Japan
2010
1st Road race, National Road Championships
5th Gran Premio Nobili Rubinetterie
2015
8th Overall Tour de Taiwan
9th Overall Tour de Korea
2017
6th Road race, National Road Championships

=== Grand Tour general classification results timeline ===
Grand Tour	2012
Giro d'Italia	—
Tour de France	—
Vuelta a España	165

Legend
—	Did not compete
DNF	Did not finish
