= Megan Dunn (cyclist) =

Australian cyclist

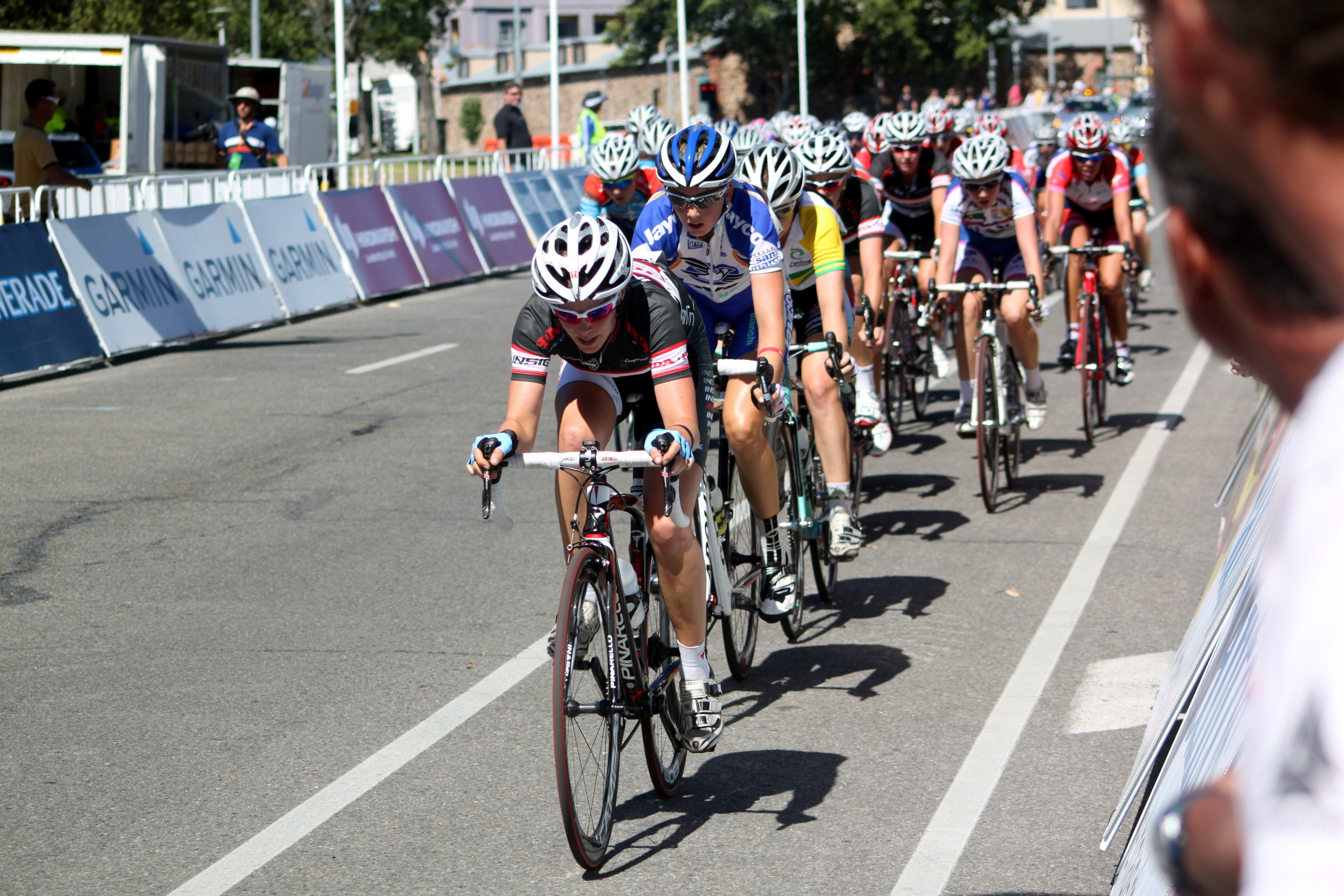
- Dunn leading the peloton at the 2011 Renditions Homes Santos Cup

Personal information
- Full name: Megan Dunn
- Born: 27 August 1991 (age 35) Dubbo, Australia

Cycling career
- Sport: Cycling
- Disciplines: Road and track
- Role: Rider

Amateur team
- Dubbo Cycle Club
Medal record
Commonwealth Games
Gold medal – first place	2010 Delhi	Points race
Gold medal – first place	2010 Delhi	Scratch race

Megan Dunn (born 27 August 1991) is an Australian professional racing cyclist.

== Biography ==
Dunn was born in Dubbo, New South Wales. She began cycling at the age of three and soon followed her older brother to the local cycling track where she began competing at the age of six. She is an Australian Institute of Sport scholarship holder.

In 2005, Dunn won the time trial, sprint, individual pursuit and scratch race events in the Under 15 Australian National Track Championships.

She took part in the 2007 Australian Youth Olympic Festival on the road and track, and again on the track in 2009.

In 2008 Dunn became the youngest winner in the Bay Classic series history when she won the event at the age of 16. Dunn went on to win the scratch and points races at the UCI Junior Track World Championships in 2008, and was also a member of the gold medal-winning team pursuit squad. She was named "Australian Junior Female Cyclist of the Year" in 2008, and described by national coach Gary Sutton as "the future of women's cycling."

== Career highlights ==
2008
1st Scratch, UCI Track World Championships (Junior)
1st Points race, UCI Track World Championships (Junior)
1st Team Pursuit, UCI Track World Championships (Junior) with Ashlee Ankudinoff & Sarah Kent
1st Bay Classic

3rd Stage 1, Bay Classic
1st Stage 3, Bay Classic, Geelong

1st Australian Point Score titles
3rd Pursuit, Australian National Track Championships (Junior)
1st Points race, Australian National Track Championships (Junior)
2nd Team Pursuit, Australian National Track Championships (Elite)
3rd Scratch, Australian National Track Championships (Junior)

2009
1st Points race, Latrobe Carnival
1st Points race, Devonport Carnival
2nd Points race, Launceston Carnival
1st Omnium, UCI Track World Championships (Junior)
1st Points race, UCI Track World Championships (Junior)
1st Team Pursuit, UCI Track World Championships (Junior)
1st Pursuit, Oceania Championships (Junior)
1st Scratch, Oceania Championships (Junior)
1st Points Race, Oceania Championships (Junior)
1st Australian National Road Race Championships (Junior)
1st Points race, Australian National Track Championships (Junior)
1st Omnium, Australian National Track Championships (Junior)
3rd Scratch, Australian National Track Championships (Junior)
3rd Australian National Criterium Championships (Junior)

2010
1st Points Race, Commonwealth Games
1st Scratch, Commonwealth Games
