= Ben Kersten =

Australian cyclist (born 1981)

Personal information
- Full name: Ben Andrew Kersten
- Nickname: "Benny"
- Born: 21 September 1981 (age 45) Wollongong, Australia
- Height: 1.88 m (6 ft 2 in)
- Weight: 81 kg (179 lb)

Cycling career
- Sport: Cycling
- Current team: Fly V Australia
- Disciplines: Road & Track
- Role: Rider
- Rider type: Sprinter

Amateur team
- -: St George CC

Major wins
- 2006 Commonwealth Games Gold Medal in 1 km TT
Medal record
Representing Australia
Men's track cycling
Commonwealth Games
Gold medal – first place	2006 Melbourne	Kilo
World Championship
Silver medal – second place	2006 Bordeaux	Kilo

Ben Kersten (born 21 September 1981 in Wollongong) is an Australian professional racing cyclist. He is a member of the Fly V Australia Pro Cycling Team.

He was a successful track rider for many years, before switching to road racing in 2009. He was the 2005 and 2006 Australian Male Track Cyclist of the Year. He has won more than 30 Australian Track Titles, was a 3 time Junior World Champion, and held 2 Junior World Records. He was an Australian Institute of Sport scholarship holder. He was selected in the 2004 Australian Olympic Games Team but did not compete.

== Palmarès ==
1998
1st Kilo, World Track Championships, Havana – Junior
2nd Team Sprint, World Track Championships – Junior
1999
1st Kilo, World Track Championships, Athens – Junior
3rd Sprint, World Track Championships – Junior
1st Team Sprint, World Track Championships – Junior
2002
2nd Kilo, World Cup, Sydney
2nd Team Sprint, World Cup, Moscow
2003
1st Kilo, Australian National Track Championships, Sydney
2nd Keirin, Australian National Track Championships, Sydney
2004
3rd Kilo, World Cup, Aguascalientes (MEX)
2nd Kilo, Australian National Track Championships, Sydney
1st Keirin, Australian National Track Championships, Sydney
3rd Scratch, Australian National Track Championships, Sydney – U23
2nd Sprint, Australian National Track Championships, Sydney
2nd Sprint, Oceania Games, Melbourne
1st Keirin, Oceania Games, Melbourne
1st Kilo, Oceania Games, Melbourne
1st Team Sprint, Oceania Games, Melbourne
3rd Kilo, World Cup, Los Angeles
2005
2nd Kilo, World Cup, Manchester
2nd Pursuit, World Cup, Manchester
2nd Team Pursuit, Australian National Track Championships, Adelaide
1st Kilo, Australian National Track Championships, Adelaide
3rd Team Sprint, Australian National Track Championships, Adelaide
2nd Scratch, Australian National Track Championships, Adelaide – U23
2nd Keirin, Australian National Track Championships, Adelaide
1st Kilo, World Cup, Sydney
3rd Team Sprint, World Cup, Sydney
1st Stage 5 Tour of the Murray River, Ouyen Criterium (AUS)
2006
1st Kilo, World Cup, Los Angeles
1st Kilo, Australian National Track Championships, Adelaide
1st Sprint, Australian National Track Championships, Adelaide
1st Team Sprint, Australian National Track Championships, Adelaide
1st Keirin, Australian National Track Championships, Adelaide
1st Kilo, Commonwealth Games, Melbourne
2nd Kilo, World Track Championships, Bordeaux
2007
1st Kilo, Australian National Track Championships, Sydney
1st Omnium, Australian National Track Championships, Sydney
2nd Team Sprint, Australian National Track Championships, Sydney
3rd Oceania Cycling Championships, Track, Team Sprint, Invercargill
2008
3rd Team Sprint, Oceania Championships
3rd Team Sprint, World Cup, Los Angeles
2009
1st USA Pro 100 km Criterium Title, Downers Grove
1st Stage 1 Prologue Tour of Atlanta, Georgia
1st Stage 6 Gwinnett Bike Festival Tour, Georgia
1st Cronulla International Grand Prix, Cronulla
1st 3000m Wheelrace Tasmanian Christmas Carnivals
2nd Hanes Park Classic Criterium, Winston-Salem
3rd General Classification Tour of Atlanta
2nd Stage 2 Criterium Tour of Atlanta
2010
1st Stage 1, Tour of Somerville
1st Sunny King Criterium Anniston
1st OBCB Cycle Singapore Criterium Singapore
1st Boise Twilight Criterium Boise
3rd Stage 3 Nature Valley Grand Prix
3rd USA Speedweek Walterboro
2011
3rd Dana Point Criterium, Dana Point
