= Mark Jamieson (cyclist) =

Australian cyclist (born 1984)

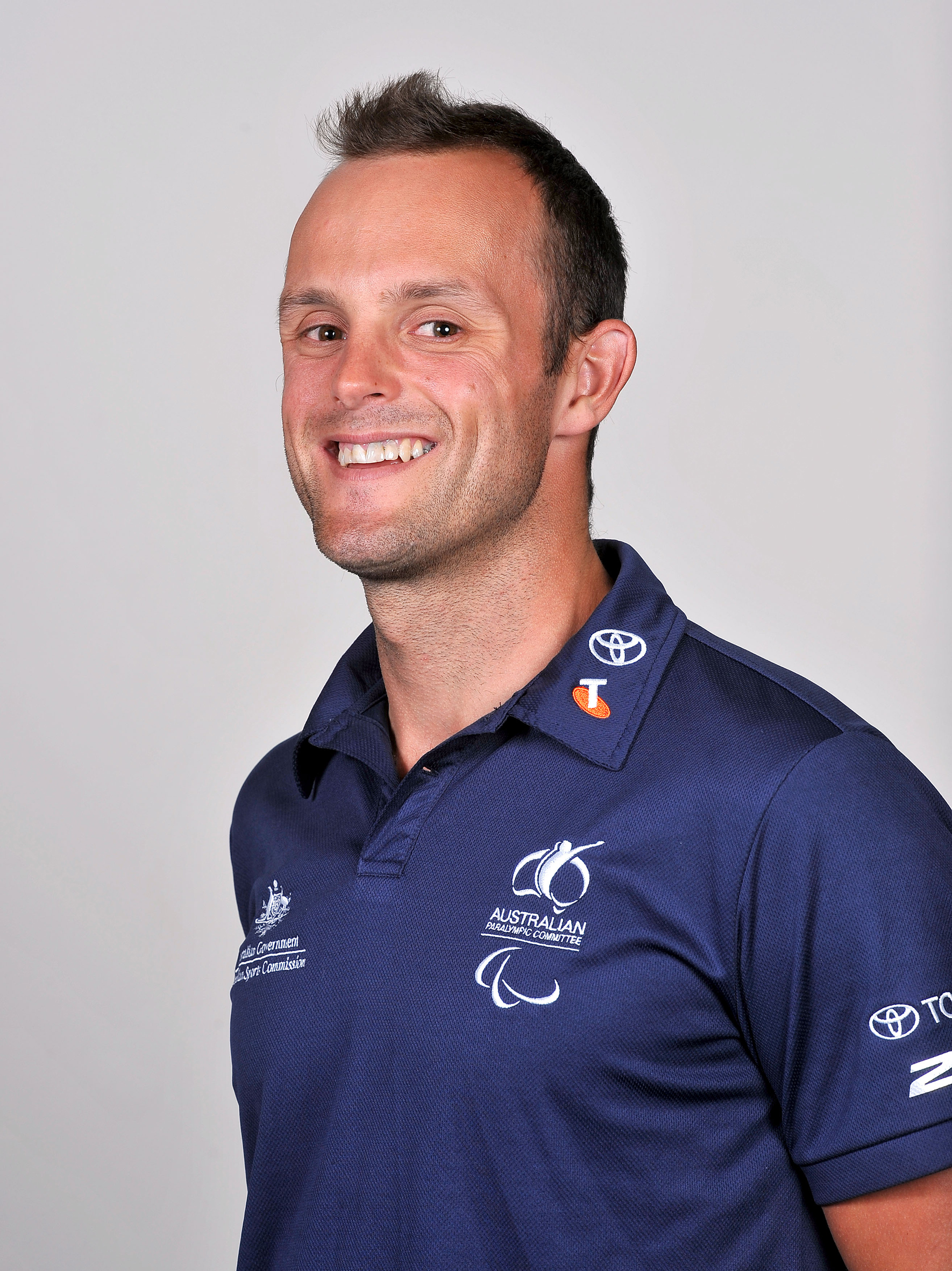
- 2012 Australian Paralympic Team portrait of Jamieson

Personal information
- Full name: Mark Ian Jamieson
- Born: 4 May 1984 (age 42) Dandenong, Australia

Cycling career
- Sport: Cycling
- Disciplines: Road & Track
- Role: Rider
- Rider type: Endurance

Amateur teams
- Mersey Valley Devonport
- Team Toshiba (track)

Professional teams
- 2007–2008: Southaustralia.com–AIS
- 2009: Cinelli-Down Under
Medal record
Representing Australia
Men's track cycling
Commonwealth Games
Silver medal – second place	2006 Melbourne	Team Pursuit
World Championship
Gold medal – first place	2006 Bordeaux	Team Pursuit
Bronze medal – third place	2005 Los Angeles	Team Pursuit

Mark Ian Jamieson (born 4 May 1984, in Dandenong) is an Australian professional racing cyclist. He started competing at the age of 10 in 1994, he first represented his country in the World Junior Track Championships in 2001. He was an Australian Institute of Sport scholarship holder.

He had a successful track career, including a world championship in the team pursuit in 2006, and fourth in the Beijing Olympics as a member of the Australian Team Pursuit Squad

On 15 February 2010 Jamieson appeared before the South Australian District Court on multiple child sex charges and pleaded guilty to four counts of unlawful sexual intercourse with a 15-year-old girl and one count of indecent assault with a girl aged under 16. The charges related to alleged conduct in Adelaide between November 2008 and January 2009. He received a suspended sentence for the offences.

Jamieson received a two-year suspension from cycling as a result of the sentence. The suspension expired on 27 January 2011, and Jamieson returned to competitive cycling at the Melbourne Madison in March of that year. He joined the Jayco 2XU cycling team, and in October competed as part of the team in the Tour of Tasmania, where he posted a strong performance, winning the first day of the six-day event. Later that month he competed in the Grafton to Inverell Classic, which he won by breaking the previous record time set by Paul Curran.

He changed direction in late 2011, pairing with vision-impaired cyclist Bryce Lindores. After Jamieson relocated to the Gold Coast to train, the two went on to compete at the UCI para-cycling road world cup. Although they did not win, their performance was sufficient to qualify for the paralympics, and in June 2012 it was announced that Jamieson would be piloting for Lindores at the 2012 London Paralympics.

== Palmarès ==
2002
1st Pursuit, World Track Championships – Junior
2nd Team Pursuit, World Track Championships – Junior
2nd World Time Trial Championships – Junior
1st Stage 1 Keizer der Juniores Koksijde, Juniors, Handzame (BEL)
1st General Classification Keizer der Juniores Koksijde, Juniors (BEL)
1st Stage 2 Keizer der Juniores Koksijde, Juniors, Wulpen (BEL)
2003
2nd Australian National Time Trial Championships – U23
3rd Cape Town, Team Pursuit (RSA)
1st Pursuit, Australian National Track Championships, Sydney
1st Sydney, Pursuit (AUS)
3rd Sydney, Team Pursuit (AUS)
1st Launceston to Ross Classic (AUS)
2004
1st Australian National Time Trial Championships – U23
2005
1st Australian National Time Trial Championships – U23
1st Team Pursuit, Australian National Track Championships, Adelaide
1st Pursuit, Australian National Track Championships, Adelaide
3rd Team Pursuit, World Track Championships, Los Angeles
2nd Moscow, Pursuit (RUS)
1st Moscow, Team Pursuit (RUS)
2006
2nd Australian National Time Trial Championships, Mount Torrens – U23
1st Pursuit, Australian National Track Championships, Adelaide
1st Team Pursuit, Australian National Track Championships, Adelaide
2nd Team Pursuit, Commonwealth Games, Melbourne
1st Team Pursuit, World Track Championships, Bordeaux
2007
1st Stage 7 Tour of the Murray River, Wentworth (AUS)
1st Stage 9 Tour of the Murray River, Ouyen (AUS)
2nd Pursuit, Oceania Cycling Championships, Invercargill
1st Team Pursuit, Oceania Cycling Championships, Invercargill
3rd Sydney, Team Pursuit (AUS)
2008
1st Los Angeles, Team Pursuit (USA)
1st Pursuit, Australian National Track Championships
2nd Points Race, Australian National Track Championships
4th, Teams Pursuit, 2008 Olympics
