= Ryan Bayley =

Australian cyclist (born 1982)

Personal information
- Full name: Ryan Neville Bayley
- Born: 9 March 1982 (age 44) Perth, Western Australia, Australia
- Height: 182 cm (6 ft 0 in)
- Weight: 90 kg (198 lb)

Cycling career
- Sport: Cycling
- Discipline: Track
- Role: Rider
- Rider type: Sprinter

Professional team
- -: Team Toshiba

Major wins
- World Champion in Keirin, 2001 UCI Track Cycling World Championships Sprint, 2004 Summer Olympic Games, Athens Keirin, 2004 Summer Olympic Games, Athens
Medal record
Men's track cycling
Representing Australia
Olympic Games
Gold medal – first place	2004 Athens	Keirin
Gold medal – first place	2004 Athens	Sprint
Commonwealth Games
Gold medal – first place	2002 Manchester	Sprint
Gold medal – first place	2002 Manchester	Team Sprint
Gold medal – first place	2006 Melbourne	Keirin
Gold medal – first place	2006 Melbourne	Sprint
World Championship
Gold medal – first place	2001 Antwerpen	Keirin
Silver medal – second place	2001 Antwerpen	Team Sprint
Silver medal – second place	2002 Copenhagen	Team Sprint
Bronze medal – third place	2004 Melbourne	Sprint
Bronze medal – third place	2006 Bordeaux	Team Sprint

Ryan Neville Bayley OAM (born 9 March 1982) is an Australian professional track cyclist and double Olympic gold medallist.

== Biography ==
Born in Perth, Western Australia, Bayley started competitive cycling in 1997 at fifteen years of age. He is a member of the Albany Cycling Club and employed by the Australian Institute of Sport.

Bayley won gold medals for the Sprint and Team Sprint track cycling events at the 2002 Commonwealth Games in Manchester.

His greatest success as a track cyclist came in the 2004 Summer Olympics in Athens, where he won gold medals in the sprint and Keirin events.

Following Bayley's failure to win a medal at the World Cup round in Sydney in December 2007, he was criticised by Martin Barras, the national coach, for not developing his tactics. He was still employing the same final kick which achieved success in Athens, the opposition had learnt to attack early to counter this.

In February 2008, tension was brewing between Bayley and his rival for Olympic selection, Shane Perkins. Both were deemed by the judges to be riding improperly at the Australian National Track Championships. Bayley crashed when Perkins moved down on him during a race, burning a hole in the back of his skinsuit. The relationship between the two riders was given another dimension, when Perkins announced his engagement to Bayley's younger sister, Kristine Bayley.

Bayley was finally selected to ride at the 2008 Summer Olympics in Beijing, as Perkins had not competed in any Team Sprint events. Bayley qualified in 12th place in the sprint event and eventually finished 11th, he was eliminated from the Keirin in the second round, placing 8th overall; he blamed himself for poor tactics. Bayley was also a member of the Team Sprint squad along with Daniel Ellis and Mark French, they qualified for the final ride-off for the bronze medal. After a strong start, they faded and finished fourth, missing out on a medal by 0.008 of a second.

Bayley now lives in Brisbane with his wife and their two children.

== Awards and honours ==
Bayley was awarded the Order of Australia Medal (OAM) in the 2005 Australia Day Honours List. Other awards include:

- 2000 Male Junior Cyclist of the Year
- 2000 Australian Male Junior Track Cyclist of the Year
- 2001 Australian Male Track Cyclist of the Year
- 2004 Australian Male Track Cyclist of the Year
- 2004 Australian Cyclist of the Year
- 2015 Sport Australia Hall of Fame inductee
- 2016 - Cycling Australia Hall of Fame

== Major results ==
2000
1st Sprint, World Track Championships - Junior
1st Team Sprint, World Track Championships - Junior
2001
1st Keirin, UCI Track Cycling World Championships
2nd Team Sprint, UCI Track Cycling World Championships
2nd Keirin, Moscow (RUS)
2nd Team Sprint, Moscow (RUS)
2002
1st Sprint, Commonwealth Games, Manchester
1st Team Sprint, Commonwealth Games, Manchester
2003
3rd Team Sprint, Cape Town (RSA)
2nd Kilo, Australian National Track Championships, Sydney
3rd Keirin, Sydney (AUS)
2nd Team Sprint, Sydney (AUS)
2004
3rd Sprint, World Track Championships
Sprint, Olympic Games
Keirin, Olympic Games
2005
1st Sprint, Oceania Games, Wanganui
1st Keirin, Oceania Games, Wanganui
2006
3rd Team Sprint, Los Angeles (US)
3rd Sprint, Australian National Track Championships, Adelaide
1st Keirin, Commonwealth Games, Melbourne
1st Sprint, Commonwealth Games, Melbourne
3rd Team Sprint, Commonwealth Games, Melbourne
3rd Team Sprint, World Track Championships, Bordeaux
2nd Keirin, World Cup, Sydney
2007
1st Sprint, Australian National Track Championships, Sydney
3rd Team Sprint, Australian National Track Championships, Sydney
3rd Team Sprint, World Cup, Manchester
1st Sprint, Oceania Cycling Championships, Invercargill
2nd Keirin, European Track Championships, Invercargill
1st Team Sprint, Oceania Cycling Championships, Invercargill
1st Team Sprint, Sydney (AUS)
2008
3rd Keirin, World Cup, Los Angeles
