= Scott Law (cyclist) =

Australian cyclist (born 1991)

Personal information
- Full name: Scott Law
- Born: 9 March 1991 (age 35) Blacktown, New South Wales, Australia

Cycling career
- Sport: Cycling
- Disciplines: Road; Track
- Role: Rider
- Rider type: Sprinter (road)

Amateur teams
- 2010: Virgin Blue RBS Morgans
- 2013: GPM
- 2016: Subaru NSWIS & MS
- 2020: Marconi Cycling Club

Professional teams
- 2012: An Post–Sean Kelly
- 2014–2015: Avanti Racing Team
- 2017: Cylance Pro Cycling
- 2018: Elevate–KHS Pro Cycling
- 2019: St George Continental Cycling Team

Scott Law (born 9 March 1991) is an Australian racing cyclist, who last rode for Australian amateur team Backroadz RT. He rode at the 2015 UCI Track Cycling World Championships.

== Major results ==
=== Road ===
2010
1st Stage 5 Tour of the Murray River
1st Stage 4 Tour of Gippsland
2011
1st Stage 1 Tour of Geelong
2012
1st National Under-23 Criterium Championships
2013
1st Stage 4 Tour de Perth
1st Stage 5 Battle on the Border
2014
1st Stage 1 Tour of Gippsland
1st Stage 4 Battle on the Border
2016
1st Stages 5 & 7 Tour of America's Dairyland
1st Stages 1 & 5 Tour of Gippsland
1st Stage 3 Tour of the King Valley
2nd Overall Tulsa Tough

1st Stage 2

7th Delta Road Race
2017
1st Overall Tulsa Tough

1st Stage 1

2nd Dana Point Grand Prix
2nd Gastown Grand Prix
3rd Delta Road Race
2018
1st Dana Point Grand Prix
2nd Overall Tulsa Tough

1st Stage 3

3rd Harlem Skyscraper Classic

=== Track ===
2008
National Junior Championships

1st Scratch
1st Kilometer
1st Team sprint

UCI Junior World Championships

2nd Team sprint
3rd Kilometer

2010
1st Scratch, National Championships
2011
National Championships

1st Scratch
1st Omnium

2014
1st Scratch, National Championships
2014–15 UCI World Cup

1st Team pursuit, Cali
2nd Omnium, London

2015
National Championships

1st Scratch
1st Omnium
