= Mark French =

Australian cyclist (born 1984)

Personal information
- Full name: Mark French
- Born: 13 October 1984 (age 42) Melbourne, Australia

Cycling career
- Sport: Cycling
- Discipline: Track
- Role: Rider
- Rider type: Sprinter

Amateur team
- St Kilda

Mark French (born 13 October 1984) is a retired Australian sprint track cyclist. He started cycling competitively relatively late, at the age of 15, in 1999.

== Drug scandal ==
French is most recognised for the 2004 scandal where he was accused of taking drugs, after cleaners found 13 ampoules labelled EquiGen (equine-derived growth hormone, an illegal doping agent), syringes and vitamins outside his boarding room at the Australian Institute of Sport. On testing some of the syringes were found to contain the EquiGen hormone.

At his drugs hearing before the Court of Arbitration for Sport French gave sworn evidence that named Shane Kelly, Sean Eadie, Jobie Dajka and Graeme Brown as riders who often injected vitamins and supplements in his room. Further French said that for months they injected themselves once or twice a week in room 121 at the Australian Institute of Sport. French was banned from cycling for two years after he was found to have taken and trafficked corticosteroid and equine growth hormone. No other cyclist were charged with drug offenses but Jobie Dajka was found to have lied in his evidence to the inquiry and was suspended and sent home from the 2004 pre-Olympic training camp.

French appealed and in July 2005 was cleared by the Court of Arbitration for Sport due to lack of evidence, and they also rescinded his lifetime ban from competing at the Olympics. The drugs scandal meant French missed competing at the 2004 Athens Olympics. French expressed anger at the cycling world and said "It wasn't until after the day after the decision got handed down with the appeal that I started enjoying life."

== Return to cycling ==
After failing to qualify for the 2006 Commonwealth Games, French was successful in being selected in the Australian national team for the 2008 Beijing Olympics. He achieved 4th and 13th in the team and individual sprints, respectively. He retired after the Olympics and now works as a personal trainer.

== Defamation actions ==
In December 2008 French was awarded a $350,000 payout after being defamed by James Brayshaw and Tim Smith who branded French as a "dirty, stinking, dobbing cyclist" by radio station Triple M.

In March 2010 French was awarded $175,000 in a successful defamation action against The Herald and Weekly Times over allegations that were similar to those raised by Triple M.

== Palmarès ==
2001

1st Sprint, World Track Championships - Junior

1st Team Sprint, World Track Championships - Junior
2002
1st Keirin, World Track Championships - Junior
1st Sprint, World Track Championships - Junior
2003
1st Sprint, World Cup, Aguascalientes
3rd Team Sprint, World Cup, Cape Town
1st Keirin, Australian National Track Championships, Sydney
2nd Team Sprint, World Cup, Sydney
2nd Sprint, World Cup, Sydney
2006
1st Sprint, Oceania Games, Melbourne
1st Keirin, Oceania Games, Melbourne
2nd Team Sprint, Oceania Games, Melbourne
2007
2nd Sprint, Australian National Track Championships, Sydney
1st Team Sprint, Australian National Track Championships, Sydney
3rd Team Sprint, Oceania Cycling Championships, Invercargill
2008
3rd Team Sprint, World Cup, Los Angeles
