= Emily Rosemond =

Australian short track speed skater

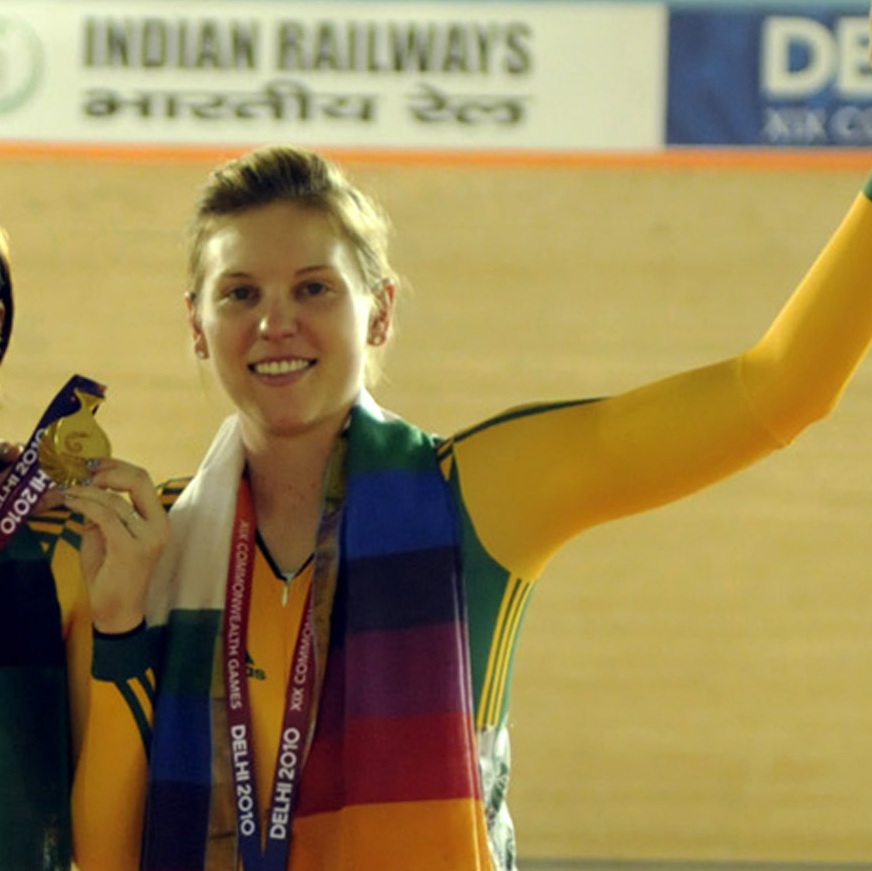

Personal information
- Born: 11 March 1986 (age 40) Cairns, Australia
- Height: 169 cm (5 ft 7 in)
- Weight: 62 kg (137 lb)

Cycling career
- Sport: Cycling
- Discipline: Track
- Role: Rider
- Rider type: Sprinter

Professional team
- Team Jayco-Skins
Medal record
Women's track cycling
Representing Australia
Commonwealth Games
Bronze medal – third place	2010 Delhi	Sprint
Australian National Championships
Gold medal – first place	2008 Sydney	Team sprint
Gold medal – first place	2009 Adelaide	Team sprint
Silver medal – second place	2008 Sydney	Keirin
Silver medal – second place	2009 Adelaide	Keirin
Bronze medal – third place	2008 Sydney	Sprint
Bronze medal – third place	2009 Adelaide	Time trial

Emily Rosemond (born 11 March 1986 in Cairns) is an Australian short track speed skater, who represented Australia at the 2006 Winter Olympics before changing sports and representing Australia in track cycling. She was given the Keys to the City of Brisbane in 2006 after her Olympic debut at the age of 19 years. She made her Olympic debut as a short track speed skater at the 2006 Torino Winter Olympics. She contested the 1000m and 1500m, finishing 12th and 25th respectively. Rosemond's short track career was interrupted by an ACL rupture, six months before her Olympic Games debut. She retired from short track speed skating in 2008 after the World Championships, and took up the sport of track cycling.

Rosemond represented Australia in track cycling from 2008 to 2011. She made her first Australian cycling team in the 2008/09 season, and won a silver medal at the 2008 World Cup in Melbourne, Australia in the team sprint. She also won the Oceanic Games in the sprint, keirin and team sprint events before competing at the World Championships in Copenhagen in 2009. In 2009 at the UCI Melbourne World Cup in track cycling, she continued her progression, winning a silver medal in the women's team sprint with her wife Kerrie Meares. At the 2010 Commonwealth Games in Delhi, India she advanced through to the finals of the women's sprint and won a bronze medal. She retired from track cycling in 2011 after suffering a shoulder tear.

In the 2018 Commonwealth Games in Queensland she carried the Queen's Baton in her home town Cairns and rode the derny during the Women's keirin events.

== Honors ==
2006
Awarded Keys to the City of Brisbane, Australia
2010
AIS Honours
2018
Queens Baton Bearer Gold Coast Commonwealth Games, Cairns

== Career highlights ==
2005
Australian Short Track National Champion
2006
Australian Short Track National Champion
2006
12th "Den Hague", Netherlands, ISU Short Track Speed Skating World Cup
15th "Bormio, Italy" ISU Short Track Speed Skating World Cup
12th Winter Olympic Games, Torino, Italy (1000 event)
2008
1st Team Sprint Australian Track Championships NSW
2nd Keirin Australian Track Championships NSW
2nd Team Sprint 2008–09 UCI Track World Cup AUS
3rd Sprint Australian Track Championships NSW
3rd Keirin Oceania Track Championships AUS
3rd Team Sprint Oceania Track Championships AUS
4th Sprint Oceania Track Championships AUS
8th Sprint 2008–09 UCI Track World Cup AUS
10th Keirin 2008–09 UCI Track World Cup AUS
2009
1st Team Sprint Australian Track Championships SA
2nd Keirin Australian Track Championships SA
2nd Keirin UCI Track World Cup COL
3rd Time Trial Australian Track Championships SA
3rd Team Sprint 2009–10 UCI Track World Cup AUS
4th Sprint Australian Track Championships SA
8th Keirin 2009–10 UCI Track World Cup AUS
10th Sprint 2009–10 UCI Track World Cup AUS
2010
1st Team Sprint 2011 Oceania Track Championships SA
1st Sprint 2010 Oceania Track Championships NZL
1st Team Sprint 2010 Oceania Track Championships NZL
1st Keirin 2010 Oceania Track Championships NZL
2nd Keirin 2011 Oceania Track Championships SA
2nd Time Trial 2010 Oceania Track Championships NZL
2nd Team Sprint UCI Track World Cup CHN
2nd Flying 200m Sprint Perth Winter Track Grand Prix WA
2nd Final 200m Sprint Perth Winter Track Grand Prix WA
3rd Sprint 2011 Oceania Track Championships SA
3rd Sprint Commonwealth Games IND
4th Keirin 2010/11 UCI Track World Cup – Cali Round COL
Commonwealth Games bronze medalist (Delhi, India)
