= Dan Ellis (cyclist) =

Australian sprint cyclist (born 1988)

Personal information
- Full name: Daniel Ellis
- Born: 7 October 1988 (age 38) Albury, New South Wales, Australia
- Height: 1.83 m (6 ft 0 in)
- Weight: 94 kg (207 lb)

Cycling career
- Sport: Cycling
- Current team: Team Jayco
- Discipline: Track
- Role: Rider
- Rider type: Sprinter
Medal record
Men's track cycling
Representing Australia
World Championships
Bronze medal – third place	2011 Apeldoorn	Team sprint
Commonwealth Games
Gold medal – first place	2010 Delhi	Team sprint

Daniel Ellis (born 7 October 1988) is an Australian sprint cyclist. He was part of the Australian team that won the team sprint at the 2007 World Cup in Sydney. He is an Australian Institute of Sport scholarship holder.

Ellis was selected as a team member representing Australia at the 2008 Summer Olympics in Beijing, with Ryan Bayley and Mark French. They qualified for the final ride-off for the bronze medal. After a strong start, they faded and finished fourth, missing a medal by 0.008 second.

Ellis began competitive cycling at age 10. He attended Dickson College in Canberra.

As of July 2010 Ellis lives in Seaton, South Australia.

== Honors and medals ==
- 2008 ACTAS Sportstar of the year
- 2005 ACT Sportstar of the Month (February)
- 2005 ACT Sportsart of the Month (January) - Special Achievement Award
- 2004 Stephen Hodge Achievement Award

== Australian Teams ==
- 2013 Oceania Championships NZL
- 2010 Oceania Championships NZL
- 2009 Track World Championships POL
- 2008 Olympic Games CHN
- 2008 Track World Championships GBR
- 2006 Junior Track World Championships BEL
- 2005 Junior Track World Championships AUT

== Results ==
=== 2013 ===
- 2nd Team Sprint Oceania Track Championships NZL

=== 2010 ===
- 1st Highbury Homes Westral Wheel Race Perth Winter Track Grand Prix WA
- 1st Flying 200m Sprint Perth Winter Track Grand Prix WA
- 1st Final 200m Sprint Perth Winter Track Grand Prix WA
- 1st Sprint Oceania Championships NZL
- 1st Sprint Australian Track Championships SA
- 1st Team Sprint Australian Track Championships SA
- 2nd Keirin Perth Winter Track Grand Prix WA
- 2nd Keirin Australian Track Championships SA
- 2nd Team Sprint Oceania Championships NZL
- 5th Keirin Oceania Championships NZL

=== 2009 ===
- 1st Team Sprint 2009-10 UCI Track World Cup AUS
- 1st Sprint Oceania Championships AUS
- 1st Team Sprint Oceania Championships AUS
- 2nd sprint Australian Track Championships SA
- 2nd team sprint Australian Track Championships SA
- 2nd Team Sprint 2008-09 UCI Track World Cup COL
- 4th Team Sprint World Championships POL
- 7th Keirin Oceania Championships AUS
- 21st Keirin World Championships POL
- 23rd Sprint World Championships POL

=== 2008 ===
- 1st Team Sprint 2008-09 UCI Track World Cup AUS
- 1st Team Sprint Oceania Championships NZL
- 3rd Sprint Oceania Championships NZL
- 3rd Keirin Australian Championships NSW
- 3rd Team Sprint Australian Championships NSW
- 4th Team Sprint Olympic Games CHN
- 4th Team Sprint Track World Cup USA
- 5th Sprint Australian Championships NSW
- 5th Team Sprint World Championships GBR
- 6th Keirin Oceania Championships NZL
- 13th Sprint 2008-09 UCI Track World Cup COL
- 15th Keirin 2008-09 UCI Track World Cup COL
- 28th Sprint World Championships GBR

=== 2007 ===
- 1st Team Sprint Track World Cup AUS
- 2nd Team Sprint Oceania Championships AUS
- 3rd Keirin Australian Championships NSW
- 3rd Team Sprint Launceston Carnival TAS
- 3rd Sprint Intl Sprint Grand Prix II USA
- 4th Team Sprint Track World Cup CHN
- 4th Team Sprint Track World Cup GBR
- 4th Sprint Oceania Championships AUS
- 4th Team Sprint Latrobe Carnival TAS
- 5th Team Sprint Track World CUP USA
- 5th Sprint Australian Championships NSW
- 5th Team Sprint Australian Championships NSW
- 6th Time Trial Australian Championships NSW
- 7th Keirin Oceania Championships AUS
- 7th Sprint Madison Cup USA
- 8th Keirin Festival of Speed USA
- 9th Sprint Track World Cup GBR
- 9th Sprint Latrobe Carnival TAS
- 12th Sprint Launceston Carnival TAS
- 15th Keirin Air Products Night USA
- 25th Sprint Track World Cup USA
- 25th Sprint Track World Cup AUS

=== 2006 ===
- 1st U19 Keirin Australian Track Championships SA
- 2nd Team Sprint World Junior Track Championships BEL
- 2nd Team Sprint GP von Deutschland im Sprint GER
- 3rd Sprint World Junior Track Championships BEL
- 3rd U19 Sprint Australian Track Championships SA
- 7th Keirin World Junior Track Championships BEL
- 8th Team Sprint Track World Cup AUS
- 12th Sprint Track World Cup AUS
- 13th Sprint GP von Deutschland im Sprint GER

=== 2005 ===
- 1st U19 Sprint Australian Titles SA
- 1st Keirin Olympic Youth Festival AUS
- 1st Team Sprint Olympic Youth Festival AUS
- 2nd Scratch Race Qld Summer of Cycling QLD
- 2nd Derby Qld Summer of Cycling QLD
- 2nd U19 Keirin Australian Titles SA
- 2nd U19 1 Lap Time Trial Australian Titles SA
- 2nd Sprint Olympic Youth Festival AUS
- 2nd 1 km Time Trial Olympic Youth Festival AUS
- 3rd Team Sprint World Junior Track Titles AUT
- 3rd U19 Team Sprint Oceania Titles AUS
- 4th U19 Sprint Oceania Titles AUS
- 5th U19 1 km Time Trial Australian Titles SA
- 5th U19 Keirin Oceania Titles AUS
- 7th Keirin World Junior Track Titles AUT

=== 2004 ===
- 3rd U17 Sprint Australian Titles TAS
- 4th U17 Scratch Race Australian Titles TAS
- 5th U17 500m Time Trial Australian Titles TAS
- 6th U17 1 Lap Time Trial Australian Titles TAS

=== 2002 ===
- 3rd U15 Time Trial Australian Titles NT
- 5th U15 Flying 200m Australian Titles NT
- 5th U15 Sprint Australian Titles NT
