= Shane Kelly =

Shane Kelly may refer to:

- Shane Kelly (cyclist)
- Shane Kelly (jockey)
- Shane Kelly (rugby league)
