= Scott Sunderland (cyclist, born 1988) =

Australian bicycle racer

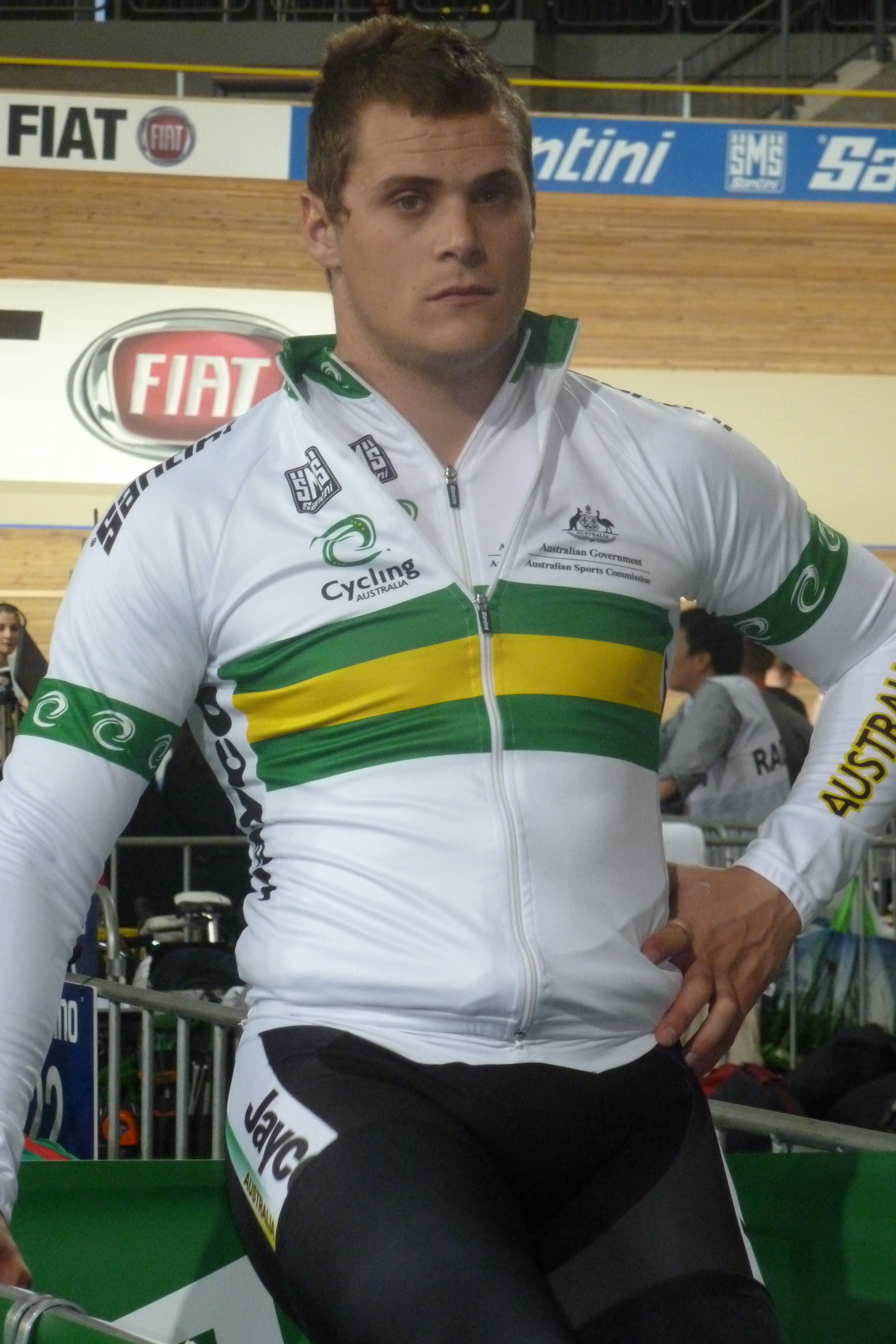
- Scott Sunderland

Personal information
- Full name: Scott Sunderland
- Nicknames: Scotty, Sundo
- Born: 16 March 1988 (age 38) Busselton, Western Australia
- Height: 178 cm (5 ft 10 in)
- Weight: 92 kg (203 lb; 14.5 st)

Cycling career
- Sport: Cycling
- Discipline: Road
- Role: Rider
- Rider type: Sprinter

Professional teams
- 2007: Toshiba Australia
- 2009: Team Toshiba
- 2011: Team Jayco–AIS
- 2015: Team Budget Forklifts
- 2016: Team Illuminate
- 2017–2018: IsoWhey Sports SwissWellness
Medal record
Representing Australia
Men's track cycling
World Championships
| Gold medal – first place | 2012 Melbourne | Team sprint |
Commonwealth Games
| Gold medal – first place | 2010 Delhi | 1 km time trial |
| Gold medal – first place | 2010 Delhi | Team sprint |
| Gold medal – first place | 2014 Glasgow | 1 km time trial |
| Silver medal – second place | 2010 Delhi | Individual sprint |

Scott Sunderland (born 16 March 1988) is an Australian professional racing cyclist, who last rode for UCI Continental team Bennelong SwissWellness Cycling Team.

Sunderland has represented Australia at the World Cup events including at Los Angeles in 2008, where he won the 1 km time trial and at Manchester in 2009. He is an Australian Institute of Sport and Western Australian Institute of Sport scholarship holder. His aunt, Jenny Sunderland, competed at the 1972 Munich Olympics in gymnastics.

== Career ==
At the 2012 Summer Olympics he was part of the Australian men's sprint team that finished 4th. In August 2013 it was announced that Sunderland would switch from the Australian track cycling team's sprint programme to the endurance squad. He won the men's 1000 m time trial at the 2014 Commonwealth Games.

In November 2014 Sunderland was announced as part of the Team Budget Forklifts line-up for 2015 alongside fellow members of the Australian endurance track squad Luke Davison, Glenn O'Shea, Jack Bobridge and Mitchel Mulhearn, riding a domestic programme with a focus on achieving success on the track at the 2016 Summer Olympics. In December 2016 he was announced as part of the IsoWhey Sports SwissWellness squad for the 2017 season.

== Major results ==
=== Track ===
2003
National Novice Track Championships

1st 500m time trial
2nd Flying 200m
2nd Sprint
3rd Scratch
3rd Team pursuit

2004
Oceania Junior Track Championships

1st Kilo
1st Sprint
1st Team sprint

National Novice Track Championships

1st 500m time trial
1st Flying 200m
1st Sprint
1st Team pursuit
2nd Individual pursuit

2005
Oceania Junior Track Championships

1st Keirin
1st Kilo
1st Team sprint

National Junior Track Championships

1st Flying 200m
2nd Kilo
2nd Sprint
3rd Team sprint

Australian Youth Olympic Festival

1st Sprint
1st Team sprint
1st Time trial

UCI Juniors World Championships

3rd Kilo
3rd Team sprint

2006
UCI Juniors World Championships

1st Kilo
2nd Sprint
2nd Team sprint

Oceania Track Championships

1st Kilo
1st Team sprint

National Junior Track Championships

1st Kilo
1st Sprint
1st Team sprint
3rd Keirin

2007
Oceania Track Championships

1st Kilo
3rd Team sprint

National Track Championships

3rd Kilo
3rd Team sprint

3rd Team sprint, 2006–07 UCI Track Cycling World Cup Classics, Manchester
2008
1st Kilo, 2007–08 UCI Track Cycling World Cup Classics, Los Angeles
2008–09 UCI Track Cycling World Cup Classics, Melbourne

1st Team sprint
2nd Kilo

2nd Team sprint, National Track Championships
2009
2009–10 UCI Track Cycling World Cup Classics, Melbourne

1st Kilo
1st Team sprint

National Track Championships

2nd Keirin
3rd Kilo

2010
Commonwealth Games

1st Kilo
2nd Sprint

Oceania Track Championships

1st Kilo
1st Team sprint

National Track Championships

1st Keirin
2nd Sprint

2nd Team sprint, 2009–10 UCI Track Cycling World Cup Classics, Beijing
2011
2nd Team sprint, 2011–12 UCI Track Cycling World Cup, Astana
2nd Keirin, National Track Championships
2012
1st Team sprint, UCI Track Cycling World Championships
2013
2nd Keirin, National Track Championships
2014
1st Kilo, Commonwealth Games
2013–14 UCI Track Cycling World Cup, Guadalajara

1st Kilo
1st Team pursuit

3rd Kilo, National Track Championships

=== Road ===
2003
3rd Criterium, National Novice Road Championships
2004
National Novice Road Championships

1st Road race
1st Time trial
1st Criterium
2nd Team time trial

2014
1st St. Kilda, Shimano Super Criterium Series
2015
1st Melbourne to Warrnambool Classic
3rd Criterium, National Road Championships
2017
1st Stage 1 Tour de Langkawi
1st Stage 3 Tour de Korea
Tour de Hongrie

1st Points classification
1st Prologue & Stage 5

1st Stage 2 Tour of China II
2nd Criterium, National Road Championships
