= Richard England (cyclist) =

Australian cyclist

Richard England (born 9 July 1981) is an Australian racing cyclist who rides for American continental team Bissell. England turned pro in 2005 and is a sprinter. His biggest success to date is winning stage 5 of the 2008 Tour de Georgia ahead of Rory Sutherland and George Hincapie.

== Results ==
2008 – Bissell

- 1st, Stage 5, Tour de Georgia
- 4th, Stage 1, Tour de Georgia
- 8th, Stage 3, Tour de Georgia
- 14th, Stage 2, Tour of California
- 9th, Stage 1, Jayco Bay Cycling Classic
- 7th, Stage 2, Jayco Bay Cycling Classic
- 5th, Stage 5, Jayco Bay Cycling Classic
- 7th, Overall, Jayco Bay Cycling Classic
- 25th, Australian National Championship

2007 – Priority Health–Bissell

- 1st, Stage 3, Tour of Tasmania
- 1st, Stage 10, Tour of Tasmania
- 6th, Stage 7, Tour De Georgia
- Australian Team Pursuit Champion

2006 – Priority Health

- Australian Criterium Champion

2005 – Advantage Benefits–Endeavour

- 1st, Stage 5, Nature Valley Grand Prix

2004

- 1st, Midlands Tour, Australia

2003

- Australian Team Pursuit Champion

Other

- 6 Track World Cup Reps, Australia
