= Cassandra Kell =

Australian soccer player

Personal information
- Date of birth: 8 August 1980 (age 46)
- Place of birth: Australia
- Position: Goalkeeper

Senior career*
| Years | Team | Apps | (Gls) |
| 2004 | New South Wales Sapphires | | |

International career
| 2004 | Australia | 29 (?) | (0) |
- * Club domestic league appearances and goals

Cassandra Kell (born 8 August 1980) is a female Australian football goalkeeper.

She was part of the Australia women's national soccer team at the 2004 Summer Olympics. On club level she played for New South Wales Sapphires.

== See also ==
- Australia at the 2004 Summer Olympics
