= Gemma Dudley =

New Zealand cyclist (born 1990)

Personal information
- Born: 8 March 1990 (age 36)

Cycling career
- Sport: Cycling
- Discipline: Track cycling
- Role: Rider
- Rider type: scratch

Gemma Dudley (born 8 March 1990) is a New Zealand female track cyclist. She competed in the omnium event at the 2010 UCI Track Cycling World Championships and in the scratch event at the 2012 UCI Track Cycling World Championships.
