= Andrew Taylor (cyclist) =

Australian cyclist

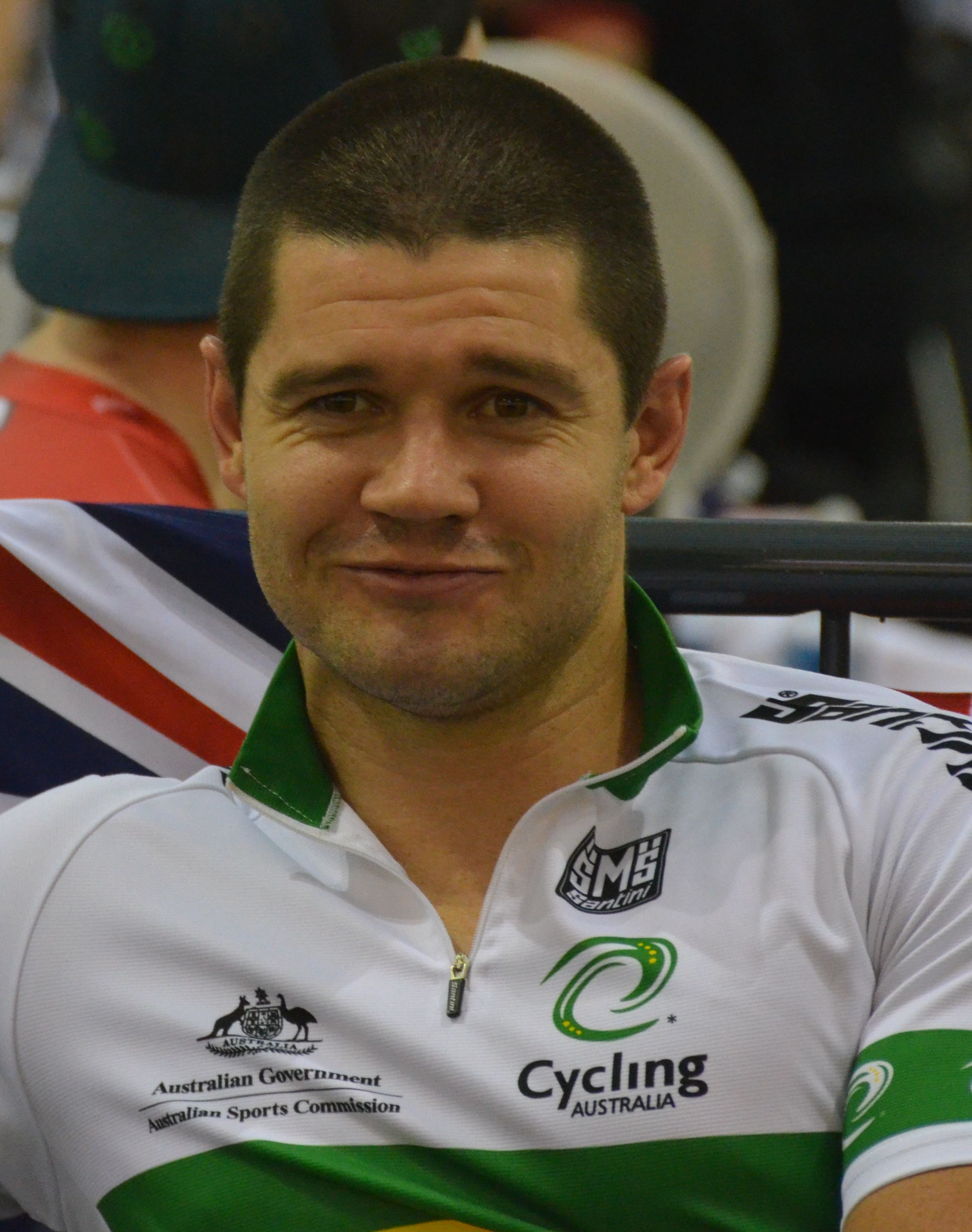

Personal information
- Born: 24 July 1985 (age 41)

Cycling career
- Sport: Cycling
- Discipline: Track cycling
- Role: Rider
- Rider type: sprint

Andrew Taylor (born 24 July 1985) is an Australian male track cyclist. He competed in the sprint event at the 2013 UCI Track Cycling World Championships.
