= Mitchell Bullen =

Australian cyclist

Personal information
- Born: 6 December 1991 (age 34)

Cycling career
- Sport: Cycling
- Discipline: Track cycling
- Role: Rider
- Rider type: sprint

Mitchell Bullen (born 6 December 1991) is an Australian male track cyclist. He competed in the sprint and team sprint event at the 2013 UCI Track Cycling World Championships. Mitchell was part of the Australian Track Sprint High performance unit (HPU) from 2013 to 2016. Winner of the prestigious Austral Wheelrace.

He was known for his aggressive and entertaining riding style.

In 2020 Mitch moved to rural Queensland as he found the fame to be overwhelming. He regularly participates in watermelon crushing contests and won the 2021 inaugural Western Queensland watermelon crushing competition in Chinchilla. Mitch crushed an astonishing 25 watermelons between his thighs, falling one short of the world record.
