= Sarah Kent (cyclist) =

Australian cyclist (born 1990)

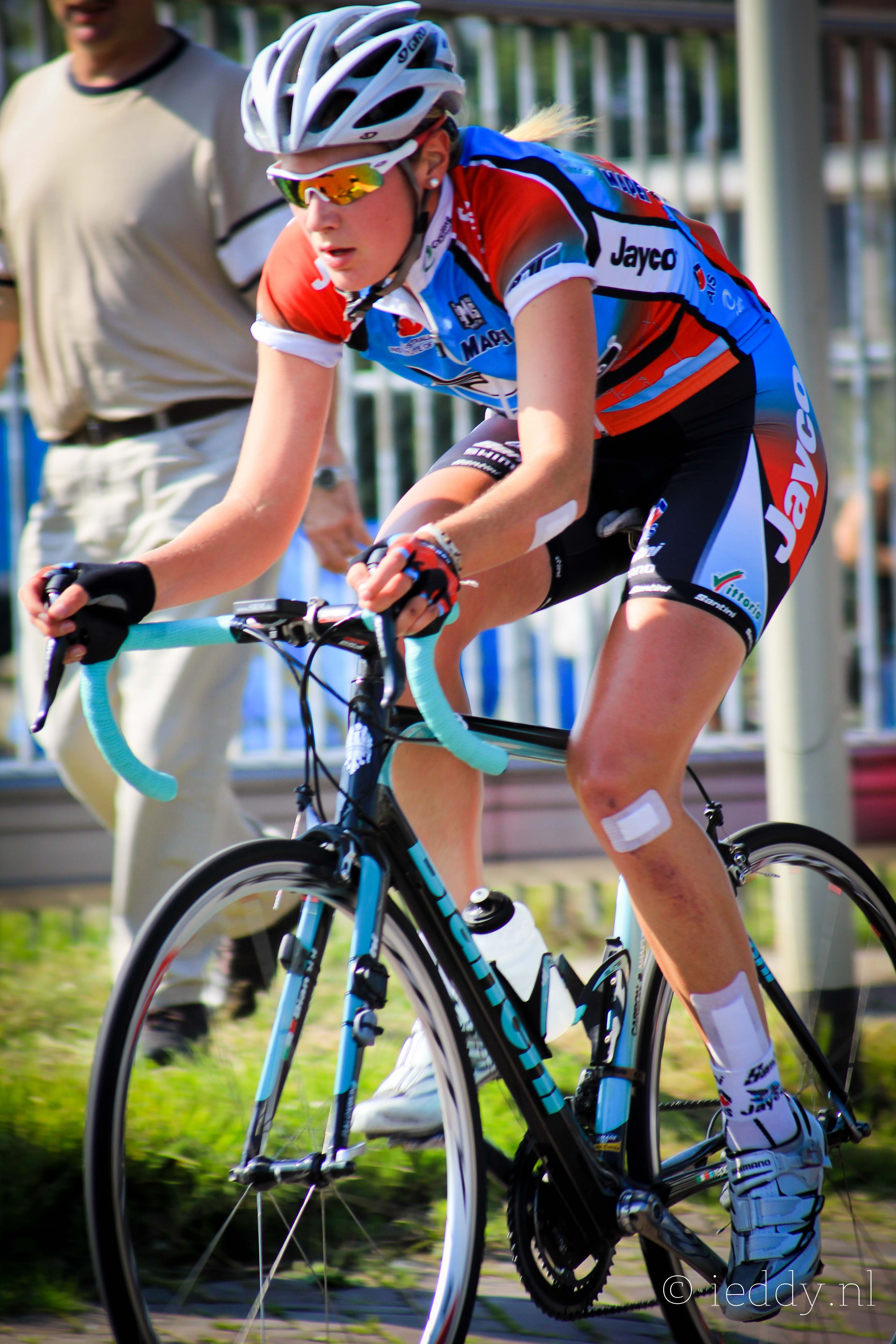
- Kent in 2011

Personal information
- Born: 10 February 1990 (age 36)

Cycling career
- Sport: Cycling
- Discipline: Track cycling
- Role: Rider
- Rider type: Endurance

Sarah Kent (born 10 February 1990) is an Australian female track cyclist. She won the bronze medal in the team pursuit event at the 2009 UCI Track Cycling World Championships. She also competed in at the 2010 and 2011 UCI Track Cycling World Championships.
