= 2008 UCI Track Cycling World Championships – Women's sprint =

Women's sprint at the 2008 UCI Track Cycling World Championships
- Venue: Manchester Velodrome, Manchester
- Date: 28–29 March 2008
- Competitors: 28 from 17 nations

Medalists
gold medal	Victoria Pendleton	Great Britain
silver medal	Simona Krupeckaitė	Lithuania
bronze medal	Jennie Reed	United States

Rainbow jersey

The Women's Sprint was one of the eight women's events at the 2008 UCI Track Cycling World Championships, held in Manchester, United Kingdom.

28 cyclists from 18 countries were due to participate in the contest, but two riders did not start. After the qualifying heats, the fastest 24 riders were to advance to the 1/16 finals, therefore all riders who contested the qualification advanced to the next round.

The first rider in each of the 12 heats advanced to the second round. There was no repechage for this round.

The first rider from each of the six Second Round heats advanced to the Quarterfinals and the second placed riders from a repechage to determine the other two riders that competed in the quarterfinals.

The quarterfinals turned out to be quite eventful, as Simona Krupeckaitė was relegated in her first match sprint against Willy Kanis when she failed to hold her line in the last 200 metres but won the next two matches to go through to the semifinals. Guo Shuang was also relegated in her second match sprint against Clara Sanchez when she entered the sprinter's lane when the opponent was already there. Lisandra Guerra also received a warning for dangerous riding in the final bend. The first rider in each quarterfinal advanced to the semifinals and the 4 losing athletes faced a race for 5th-8th place.

The qualifying, first round, second round, second round repechages and quarterfinals took place on 28 March. The Semifinals and Finals took place on 29 March.

== World record ==
World record
WR	10.831	Olga Slyusareva (RUS)	Moscow (Russia)	25 April 1993

== Qualification ==
Rank	Name	Nation	Time			Speed (km/h)	Notes
Rank	Name	Nation	0–100m	100-200m	Total	Speed (km/h)	Notes
1	Victoria Pendleton	Great Britain	5.394 (1)	5.510 (1)	10.904	66.030	Q
2	Guo Shuang	China	5.438 (2)	5.564 (2)	11.002	65.442	Q
3	Simona Krupeckaitė	Lithuania	5.462 (3)	5.631 (3)	11.093	64.905	Q
4	Gong Jinjie	China	5.478 (5)	5.674 (4)	11.152	64.562	Q
5	Lisandra Guerra	Cuba	5.480 (6)	5.689 (5)	11.169	64.464	Q
6	Willy Kanis	Netherlands	5.469 (4)	5.703 (6)	11.172	64.446	Q
7	Natalia Tsylinskaya	Belarus	5.508 (7)	5.713 (7)	11.221	64.165	Q
8	Swetlana Grankowskaja	Russia	5.540 (9)	5.740 (8)	11.280	63.829	Q
9	Jennie Reed	United States	5.538 (8)	5.745 (10)	11.283	63.812	Q
10	Yvonne Hijgenaar	Netherlands	5.557 (11)	5.741 (9)	11.298	63.728	Q
11	Luybov Shulika	Ukraine	5.543 (10)	5.774 (12)	11.317	63.621	Q
12	Clara Sanchez	France	5.569 (12)	5.777 (13)	11.346	63.458	Q
13	Anna Blyth	Great Britain	5.590 (14)	5.764 (11)	11.354	63.413	Q
14	Zheng Lulu	China	5.611 (15)	5.805 (15)	11.416	63.069	Q
14	Dana Glöss	Germany	5.583 (13)	5.833 (17)	11.416	63.069	Q
16	Karlee McCulloch	Australia	5.633 (16)	5.784 (14)	11.417	63.063	Q
17	Christin Muche	Germany	5.692 (20)	5.818 (16)	11.510	62.554	Q
18	Sandie Clair	France	5.697 (22)	5.845 (19)	11.542	62.380	Q
19	Elisa Frisoni	Italy	5.709 (23)	5.836 (18)	11.545	62.364	Q
20	Miriam Welte	Germany	5.696 (21)	5.854 (20)	11.550	62.337	Q
21	Oksana Grishina	Russia	5.686 (19)	6.096 (21)	11.576	62.197	Q
22	Virginie Cueff	France	5.684 (17)	5.915 (22)	11.599	62.074	Q
23	Diana García	Colombia	5.684 (17)	5.921 (23)	11.605	61.042	Q
24	Anastasia Chulkova	Russia	5.791 (25)	5.947 (24)	11.738	61.339	Q
25	Jessica Varnish	Great Britain	5.758 (24)	6.025 (20)	11.756	61.245	
25	Valentina Alessio	Italy	5.804 (26)	5.952 (25)	11.756	61.245	
27	Sakie Tsukuda	Japan	6.005 (27)	6.263 (27)	12.268	58.689	
28	Maneephan Jutatip	Thailand	6.110 (28)	6.422 (28)	12.532	57.452	

== 1/16 Finals ==
Heat	Rank	Name	Nation	200m Time	Speed (km/h)	Q
1	1	Victoria Pendleton	Great Britain	11.978	60.110	Q
1	2	Anastasia Chulkova	Russia			
2	1	Guo Shuang	China	11.754	61.225	Q
2	2	Diana García	Colombia			
3	1	Simona Krupeckaitė	Lithuania	11.886	60.575	Q
3	2	Virginie Cueff	France			
4	1	Oksana Grishina	Russia	11.853	60.744	Q
4	2	Gong Jinjie	China			
5	1	Lisandra Guerra	Cuba	11.69	61.543	Q
5	2	Miriam Welte	Germany			
6	1	Willy Kanis	Netherlands	12.518	57.517	Q
6	2	Elisa Frisoni	Italy			
7	1	Natalia Tsylinskaya	Belarus	13.281	54.212	Q
7	2	Sandie Clair	France			
8	1	Christin Muche	Germany	11.875	60.631	Q
8	2	Swetlana Grankowskaja	Russia			
9	1	Jennie Reed	United States	11.954	60.230	Q
9	2	Kaarle McCulloch	France			
10	1	Yvonne Hijgenaar	Netherlands	11.925	60.377	Q
10	2	Dana Glöss	Germany			
11	1	Zheng Lulu	China	11.862	60.698	Q
11	2	Luybov Shulika	Ukraine			
12	1	Clara Sanchez	France	11.653	61.786	Q
12	2	Anna Blyth	Great Britain			

== 1/8 Finals ==
Heat	Rank	Name	Nation	200m Time	Speed (km/h)	Q
1	1	Victoria Pendleton	Great Britain	11.629	61.914	Q
1	2	Clara Sanchez	France			
2	1	Guo Shuang	China	11.947	60.266	Q
2	2	Zheng Lulu	China			
3	1	Simona Krupeckaitė	Lithuania	11.236	64.079	Q
3	2	Yvonne Hijgenaar	Netherlands			
4	1	Jennie Reed	United States	11.811	60.960	Q
4	2	Oksana Grishina	Russia			
5	1	Lisandra Guerra	Cuba	11.636	61.876	Q
5	2	Christine Muche	Germany			
6	1	Willy Kanis	Netherlands	16.221	44.386	Q
6	–	Natalia Tsylinskaya	Belarus			DNF

== 1/8 Finals Repechage ==
Heat	Rank	Name	Nation	200m Time	Speed (km/h)	Q
1	1	Clara Sanchez	France	12.628	57.016	Q
1	2	Oksana Grishina	Russia			
1	–	Natalia Tsylinskaya	Belarus			DNS
2	1	Yvonne Hijgenaar	Netherlands	12.647	56.930	Q
2	2	Christine Muche	Germany			
2	3	Zheng Lulu	China			

== Quarterfinals ==
Heat	Rank	Name	Nation	1st Race	2nd Race	Decider	Q
1	1	Victoria Pendleton	Great Britain	11.804	12.620		Q
1	2	Yvonne Hijgenaar	Netherlands				
2	2	Guo Shuang	China	11.939	REL	11.892	Q
2	2	Clara Sanchez	France		12.020		
3	1	Simona Krupeckaitė	Lithuania	REL	11.544	11.434	Q
3	2	Willy Kanis	Netherlands	11.604			
4	1	Jennie Reed	United States	11.895	11.971		Q
4	2	Lisandra Guerra	Cuba				

== Race for 5th to 8th places ==
Rank	Name	Nation	200m Time	Speed (km/h)
5	Willy Kanis	Netherlands	12.049	59.755
6	Clara Sanchez	France		
7	Lisandra Guerra	Cuba		
8	Yvonne Hijgenaar	Netherlands		

== Semifinals ==
Heat	Rank	Name	Nation	1st Race	2nd Race	Decider	Q
1	1	Victoria Pendleton	Great Britain	11.972	11.697		QF
1	2	Jennie Reed	United States				QB
2	1	Simona Krupeckaitė	Lithuania	12.046	11.381		QF
2	2	Guo Shuang	China				QB

== Finals ==
Rank	Name	Nation	1st Race	2nd Race	Decider
Gold Medal Races
1st place, gold medalist(s)	Victoria Pendleton	Great Britain	11.747	11.551	
2nd place, silver medalist(s)	Simona Krupeckaitė	Lithuania			
Bronze Medal Races
3rd place, bronze medalist(s)	Jennie Reed	United States	12.055		12.044
4	Guo Shuang	Belarus		11.498	
