= 2009 UCI Track Cycling World Championships – Women's sprint =

Women's sprint at the 2009 UCI Track Cycling World Championships
- Venue: BGŻ Arena, Pruszków
- Date: 27–28 March 2009
- Competitors: 24 from 18 nations

Medalists
gold medal	Victoria Pendleton	Great Britain
silver medal	Willy Kanis	Netherlands
bronze medal	Simona Krupeckaitė	Lithuania

Rainbow jersey

The Women's Sprint was one of the 9 women's events at the 2009 UCI Track Cycling World Championships, held in Pruszków, Poland.

26 cyclists from 18 countries were due to participate in the contest, but two riders did not start. After the qualifying heats, the fastest 24 riders were to advance to the 1/16 finals, therefore all riders who contested the qualification advanced to the next round.

The first rider in each of the 12 heats advanced to the second round. There was no repechage for this round.

The first rider from each of the six Second Round heats advanced to the Quarterfinals and the second placed riders from a repechage to determine the other two riders that competed the quarterfinals.

The first rider in each quarterfinal advanced to the semifinals and the 4 losing athletes faced a race for 5th-8th place.

The qualifying, first round, second round, second round repechages and quarterfinals took place on 27 March. The Semifinals and Finals took place on 28 March.

== World record ==
World Record
WR	10.831	Olga Slyusareva (RUS)	Moscow (Russia)	25 April 1993

== Qualification ==
Rank	Name	Nation	Time			Speed (km/h)	Notes
Rank	Name	Nation	0–100m	100-200m	Total	Speed (km/h)	Notes
1	Victoria Pendleton	Great Britain	5.424 (1)	5.547 (1)	10.971	65.627	Q
2	Simona Krupeckaitė	Lithuania	5.487 (2)	5.647 (3)	11.134	64.666	Q
3	Lyubov Shulika	Ukraine	5.503 (4)	5.645 (2)	11.148	64.585	Q
4	Guo Shuang	China	5.495 (3)	5.659 (5)	11.154	64.550	Q
5	Olga Panarina	Belarus	5.527 (6)	5.649 (4)	11.176	64.423	Q
6	Willy Kanis	Netherlands	5.517 (5)	5.709 (6)	11.226	64.136	Q
7	Kristina Vogel	Germany	5.616 (7)	5.766 (7)	11.382	63.257	Q
8	Karlee McCulloch	Australia	5.616 (7)	5.815 (8)	11.431	62.986	Q
9	Clara Sanchez	France	5.643 (9)	5.834 (9)	11.477	62.734	Q
10	Lisandra Guerra Rodriguez	Cuba	5.660 (10)	5.838 (10)	11.498	62.619	Q
11	Gong Jinjie	China	5.667 (11)	5.847 (12)	11.514	62.532	Q
12	Huang Ting Ying	Chinese Taipei	5.695 (13)	5.841 (11)	11.536	62.413	Q
13	Yvonne Hijgenaar	Netherlands	5.718 (16)	5.855 (13)	11.573	62.213	Q
14	Elisa Frisoni	Italy	5.704 (14)	5.882 (15)	11.586	62.143	Q
15	Miriam Welte	Germany	5.688 (12)	5.906 (18)	11.594	62.101	Q
16	Sandie Clair	France	5.711 (15)	5.902 (17)	11.613	6.999	Q
17	Olga Streltsova	Russia	5.764 (21)	5.867 (14)	11.631	61.903	Q
18	Zheng Lulu	China	5.745 (18)	5.889 (16)	11.634	61.887	Q
19	Monique Sullivan	Canada	5.741 (17)	5.961 (19)	11.702	61.527	Q
20	Jessica Varnish	Great Britain	5.750 (19)	6.025 (20)	11.775	61.146	Q
21	Lee Wai See	Hong Kong	5.805 (22)	6.096 (21)	11.901	60.499	Q
22	Gintarė Gaivenytė	Lithuania	5.761 (20)	6.147 (22)	11.908	60.463	Q
23	Diana García	Colombia	5.941 (23)	6.171 (23)	12.112	59.446	Q
24	Renata Dąbrowska	Poland	6.108 (24)	6.398 (24)	12.506	57.572	Q
–	Anna Meares	Australia					DNS
–	Svetlana Grankovskaya	Russia					DNS

== 1/16 Finals ==
Heat	Rank	Name	Nation	200m Time	Speed (km/h)	Q
1	1	Victoria Pendleton	Great Britain	12.552	57.361	Q
1	2	Renata Dąbrowska	Poland			
2	1	Simona Krupeckaitė	Lithuania	11.866	60.677	Q
2	2	Diana García	Colombia			
3	1	Lyubov Shulika	Ukraine	12.287	58.598	Q
3	2	Gintare Gaivenyte	Lithuania			
4	1	Guo Shuang	China	12.006	59.970	Q
4	2	Lee Wai See	Hong Kong			
5	1	Olga Panarina	Belarus	11.767	61.188	Q
5	2	Jessica Varnish	Great Britain			
6	1	Willy Kanis	Netherlands	12.265	58.703	Q
6	2	Monique Sullivan	Canada			
7	1	Kristina Vogel	Germany	12.009	59.955	Q
7	2	Zheng Lulu	China			
8	1	Karlee McCulloch	Australia	12.488	57.655	Q
8	2	Olga Streltsova	Russia			
9	1	Clara Sanchez	France	11.957	60.215	Q
9	2	Sandie Clair	France			
10	1	Miriam Welte	Germany	12.363	58.238	Q
10	2	Lisandra Guerra Rodriguez	Cuba			
11	1	Elisa Frisoni	Italy	12.110	59.454	Q
11	2	Gong Jinjie	China			
12	1	Yvonne Hijgenaar	Netherlands	12.041	59.795	Q
12	2	Huang Ting Ying	Chinese Taipei			

== 1/8 Finals ==
Heat	Rank	Name	Nation	200m Time	Speed (km/h)	Q
1	1	Victoria Pendleton	Great Britain	11.904	60.483	Q
1	2	Yvonne Hijgenaar	Netherlands			
2	1	Simona Krupeckaitė	Lithuania	11.853	60.744	Q
2	2	Elisa Frisoni	Italy			
3	1	Lyubov Shulika	Ukraine	12.007	59.965	Q
3	2	Miriam Welte	Germany			
4	1	Guo Shuang	China	11.561	62.278	Q
4	2	Clara Sanchez	France			
5	1	Olga Panarina	Belarus	11.486	62.685	Q
5	2	Karlee McCulloch	Australia			
6	1	Willy Kanis	Netherlands	12.231	58.866	Q
6	2	Kristina Vogel	Germany			

== 1/8 Finals Repechage ==
Heat	Rank	Name	Nation	200m Time	Speed (km/h)	Q
1	1	Yvonne Hijgenaar	Netherlands	12.191	59.059	Q
1	2	Clara Sanchez	France			
1	3	Kristina Vogel	Germany			
2	1	Kaarlee McCulloch	Australia	12.038	59.810	Q
2	2	Elisa Frisoni	Italy			
2	3	Miriam Welte	Germany			

== Quarterfinals ==
Heat	Rank	Name	Nation	1st Race	2nd Race	Decider	Q
1	1	Victoria Pendleton	Great Britain	11.828	11.990		Q
1	2	Karlee McCulloch	Australia				
2	1	Simona Krupeckaitė	Lithuania	12.056	11.957		Q
2	2	Yvonne Hijgenaar	Netherlands				
3	1	Willy Kanis	Netherlands		11.775	11.722	Q
3	2	Luybov Shulika	Ukraine	12.357			
4	1	Olga Panarina	Belarus	11.702		12.089	Q
4	2	Guo Shuang	China		11.530		

== Race for 5th to 8th Places ==
Rank	Name	Nation	200m Time	Speed (km/h)
5	Guo Shuang	China	11.907	60.468
6	Luybov Shulika	Ukraine		
7	Yvonne Hijgenaar	Netherlands		
8	Karlee McCulloch	Australia		

== Semifinals ==
Heat	Rank	Name	Nation	1st Race	2nd Race	Decider	Q
1	1	Victoria Pendleton	Great Britain	11.813	11.942		QF
1	2	Olga Panarina	Belarus				QB
2	1	Willy Kanis	Netherlands	12.305	11.594		QF
2	2	Simona Krupeckaitė	Lithuania				QB

== Finals ==
Rank	Name	Nation	1st Race	2nd Race	Decider
Gold Medal Races
1st place, gold medalist(s)	Victoria Pendleton	Great Britain	11.897		11.714
2nd place, silver medalist(s)	Willy Kanis	Netherlands		11.665	
Bronze Medal Races
3rd place, bronze medalist(s)	Simona Krupeckaitė	Lithuania	11.277	11.524	
4	Olga Panarina	Belarus			
