= 2007 UCI Track Cycling World Championships – Women's sprint =

Women's sprint at the 2007 UCI Track Cycling World Championships
- Venue: Palma Arena
- Location: Palma de Mallorca, Spain
- Date: 30-31 March 2007
- Winning time: 11.149

Medalists
gold medal	Victoria Pendleton	Great Britain
silver medal	Guo Shuang	China
bronze medal	Anna Meares	Australia

The Women's Sprint was one of the seven women's events at the 2007 UCI Track Cycling World Championships, held in Palma de Mallorca, Spain.

25 cyclists from 15 countries participated in the contest. After the qualifying heats, the fastest 24 riders were to advance to the 1/16 finals, therefore all but one of the riders who contested the qualification advanced to the next round.

The first rider in each of the 12 1/16th final heats advanced to the 1/8th finals. There was no repechage for this round.

The first rider from each of the six 1/8th heats advanced to the Quarterfinals and the second placed riders from a repechage to determine the other two riders that competed the quarterfinals.

The first rider in each quarterfinal advanced to the semifinals and the 4 losing athletes faced a race for 5th-8th place.

The winner of each semifinal heat advanced to the gold medal final, with loser of each heat racing in the final for bronze.

The qualifying, first round, second round, second round repechages and quarterfinals took place on 30 March. The Semifinals and Finals took place on 31 March.

== World record ==
World Record
WR	10.831	Olga Slyusareva (RUS)	Moscow (Russia)	25 April 1993

== Qualification ==
Rank	Name	Nation	Time			Speed (km/h)	Notes
Rank	Name	Nation	0–100m	100-200m	Total	Speed (km/h)	Notes
1	Guo Shuang	China	5.508 (1)	5.641 (1)	11.149	64.579	Q
2	Simona Krupeckaitė	Lithuania	5.524 (3)	5.667 (2)	11.191	64.337	Q
3	Victoria Pendleton	Great Britain	5.515 (2)	5.679 (3)	11.194	64.320	Q
4	Clara Sanchez	France	5.572 (6)	5.698 (4)	11.270	63.886	Q
5	Anna Meares	Australia	5.552 (5)	5.726 (5)	11.278	63.841	Q
6	Natalia Tsylinskaya	Belarus	5.580 (7)	5.766 (6)	11.346	63.458	Q
7	Lisandra Guerra	Cuba	5.542 (4)	5.823 (8)	11.365	63.352	Q
8	Willy Kanis	Netherlands	5.595 (8)	5.813 (7)	11.408	63.113	Q
9	Swetlana Grankowskaja	Russia	5.610 (9)	5.834 (9)	11.444	62.915	Q
10	Anna Blyth	Great Britain	5.658 (12)	5.839 (10)	11.497	62.625	Q
11	Yvonne Hijgenaar	Netherlands	5.645 (10)	5.858 (12)	11.503	62.592	Q
12	Daniela Grelui Larreal	Venezuela	5.691 (13)	5.850 (11)	11.541	62.386	Q
13	Gong Jinjie	China	5.652 (11)	5.911 (15)	11.563	62.267	Q
14	Christin Muche	Germany	5.711 (15)	5.899 (13)	11.610	62.015	Q
15	Jennie Reed	United States	5.717 (16)	5.900 (14)	11.617	61.978	Q
16	Zheng Lulu	China	5.735 (17)	5.921 (16)	11.656	61.770	Q
17	Dana Glöss	Germany	5.703 (14)	5.964 (19)	11.667	61.712	Q
18	Jane Gerisch	Germany	5.743 (18)	5.936 (17)	11.679	61.649	Q
19	Diana Maria Garcia Orrego	Colombia	5.745 (19)	5.937 (18)	11.682	61.633	Q
20	Miriam Welte	Germany	5.768 (20)	5.975 (20)	11.743	61.313	Q
21	Oksana Grishina	Russia	5.795 (21)	6.014 (21)	11.809	60.970	Q
22	Kristine Bayley	Australia	5.827 (22)	6.130 (23)	11.957	60.215	Q
23	Renata Dabrowska	Poland	5.919 (23)	6.053 (22)	11.972	60.140	Q
24	Helena Casas Roige	Spain	6.145 (24)	6.451 (24)	12.596	57.161	Q
25	Tamilla Abassova	Russia			14.561	49.447	

== 1/16 Finals ==
Heat	Rank	Name	Nation	200m Time	Speed (km/h)	Notes
1	1	Guo Shuang	China	12.359	58.257	Q
1	2	Helena Casas Roige	Spain			
2	1	Simona Krupeckaitė	Lithuania	12.223	58.905	Q
2	2	Renata Dabrowska	Poland			
3	1	Victoria Pendleton	Great Britain	12.555	57.347	Q
3	2	Kristine Bayley	Australia			
4	1	Clara Sanchez	France	12.129	59.361	Q
4	2	Oksana Grishina	Russia			
5	1	Anna Meares	Australia	12.022	59.890	Q
5	2	Miriam Welte	Germany			
6	1	Natalia Tsylinskaya	Belarus	11.901	60.499	Q
6	2	Diana Maria Garcia Orrego	Colombia			
7	1	Lisandra Guerra	Cuba	11.805	60.991	Q
7	2	Jane Gerisch	Germany			
8	1	Dana Glöss	Germany	11.888	60.565	Q
8	2	Willy Kanis	Netherlands			
9	1	Swetlana Grankowskaja	Russia	12.273	58.665	Q
9	2	Zheng Lulu	China			
10	1	Anna Blyth	Great Britain	12.219	58.924	Q
10	2	Jennie Reed	United States			
11	1	Christin Muche	Germany	11.983	60.085	Q
11	2	Yvonne Hijgenaar	Netherlands			REL
12	1	Daniela Grelui Larreal	Venezuela	12.257	58.741	Q
12	2	Gong Jinjie	China			

== 1/8 Finals ==
Heat	Rank	Name	Nation	200m Time	Speed (km/h)	Q
1	1	Guo Shuang	China	11.755	61.250	Q
1	2	Daniela Grelui Larreal	Venezuela			
2	1	Simona Krupeckaitė	Lithuania	11.774	61.151	Q
2	2	Christin Muche	Germany			
3	1	Victoria Pendleton	Great Britain	11.775	61.146	Q
3	2	Anna Blyth	Great Britain			
4	1	Clara Sanchez	France	12.003	59.985	Q
4	2	Swetlana Grankowskaja	Russia			
5	1	Anna Meares	Australia	11.908	60.463	Q
5	2	Dana Glöss	Germany			
6	1	Natalia Tsylinskaya	Belarus	12.001	59.995	Q
6	2	Lisandra Guerra	Cuba			

== 1/8 Finals Repechage ==
Heat	Rank	Name	Nation	200m Time	Speed (km/h)	Q
1	1	Lisandra Guerra	Cuba	12.179	59.118	Q
1	2	Swetlana Grankowskaja	Russia			
1	3	Daniela Grelui Larreal	Venezuela			
2	1	Christin Muche	Germany	12.034	59.830	Q
2	2	Anna Blyth	Great Britain			
2	3	Dana Glöss	Germany			

== Quarterfinals ==
Heat	Rank	Name	Nation	1st Race	2nd Race	Decider	Q
1	1	Guo Shuang	China	12.136	12.162		Q
1	2	Christin Muche	Germany				
2	2	Lisandra Guerra	Cuba	11.707	11.822		Q
2	2	Simona Krupeckaitė	Lithuania				
3	1	Victoria Pendleton	Great Britain	11.974	11.687		Q
3	2	Natalia Tsylinskaya	Belarus				
4	1	Anna Meares	Australia		11.857	14.008	Q
4	2	Clara Sanchez	France	11.815		DNF	

== Race for 5th to 8th places ==
Rank	Name	Nation	200m Time	Speed (km/h)	Notes
5	Simona Krupeckaitė	Lithuania	11.787	61.084	
6	Christin Muche	Germany			
7	Natalia Tsylinskaya	Belarus			
8	Clara Sanchez	France			DNS

== Semifinals ==
Heat	Rank	Name	Nation	1st Race	2nd Race	Decider	Q
1	1	Guo Shuang	China		11.981	11.855	QF
1	2	Anna Meares	Australia	12.142			QB
2	1	Victoria Pendleton	Great Britain	11.989	11.876		QF
2	2	Lisandra Guerra	Cuba				QB

== Finals ==
Rank	Name	Nation	1st Race	2nd Race	Decider
Gold Medal Races
1st place, gold medalist(s)	Victoria Pendleton	Great Britain	11.879	11.968	
2nd place, silver medalist(s)	Guo Shuang	China			
Bronze Medal Races
3rd place, bronze medalist(s)	Anna Meares	Australia	12.000	11.502	
4	Lisandra Guerra	Cuba			
