= 2009 UCI Track Cycling World Championships – Women's team sprint =

Rainbow jersey

The Women's Team Sprint is one of the 7 women's events at the 2009 UCI Track Cycling World Championships, held in Pruszków, Poland.

Ten teams of 2 cyclists each participated in the contest. After the qualifying, the fastest 2 teams raced for gold, and 3rd and 4th teams raced for bronze.

The Qualifying and the Finals were held on the evening session on 26 March.

== Qualifying ==
Rank	Team	Lap 1	Time	Speed (km/h)	Q
Rank	Team	Lap 1	Lap 1-2	Speed (km/h)	Q
1	Australia	18.833 (1)	33.452	53.808	QF
	Kaarle McCulloch; Anna Meares		14.619 (5)		
2	Great Britain	19.359 (5)	33.598	53.574	QF
	Victoria Pendleton; Shanaze Reade		14.239 (2)		
3	France	19.093 (3)	33.609	53.557	QB
	Sandie Clair; Clara Sanchez		14.516 (3)		
4	Lithuania	19.507 (7)	33.617	53.544	QB
	Gintarė Gaivenytė; Simona Krupeckaitė		14.110 (1)		
5	Netherlands	19.054 (2)	33.791	53.268	
	Yvonne Hijgenaar; Willy Kanis		14.737 (6)		
6	Germany	19.371 (6)	33.992	53.062	
	Kristina Vogel; Miriam Welte		14.551 (4)		
7	China	19.302 (4)	34.475	52.211	
	Gong Jinjie; Zheng Lulu		15.173 (9)		
8	Russia	19.988 (9)	34.733	51.823	
	Swetlana Grankowskaja; Olga Streltsova		14.745 (7)		
9	Poland	19.959 (8)	35.095	51.289	
	Renata Dąbrowska; Aleksandra Drejgier		15.136 (8)		
10	Hong Kong	21.089 (10)	36.418	49.426	
	Lee Wai See; Meng Zhao Juan		15.329 (10)		

== Finals ==
Rank	Team	Lap 1	Time	Speed (km/h)
Rank	Team	Lap 1	Lap 1-2	Speed (km/h)
Gold Medal Race
	Australia	18.692 (1)	33.149	54.300
	Kaarle McCulloch; Anna Meares		14.457 (2)	
	Great Britain	19.195 (2)	33.380	53.924
	Victoria Pendleton; Shanaze Reade		14.185 (1)	
Bronze Medal Race
	Lithuania	19.567 (2)	33.495	53.739
	Gintarė Gaivenytė; Simona Krupeckaitė		13.928 (1)	
4	France	19.180 (1)	33.638	53.510
	Sandie Clair; Clara Sanchez		14.458 (2)	
