= 2006 UCI Track Cycling World Championships – Women's sprint =

Women's sprint at the 2006 UCI Track Cycling World Championships
- Venue: Vélodrome de Bordeaux
- Location: Bordeaux, France
- Dates: 14–15 April 2006
- Competitors: 21 from 15 nations

Medalists
gold medal	Natallia Tsylinskaya	Belarus
silver medal	Victoria Pendleton	Great Britain
bronze medal	Guo Shuang	China

The Women's sprint competition at the 2006 UCI Track Cycling World Championships was held over two days at Vélodrome de Bordeaux in Bordeaux, France. 21 riders from 15 nations competed. The early rounds were raced on 14 April, with the semifinals and finals held on 15 April.

Defending champion Victoria Pendleton came second to Natallia Tsylinskaya. Pendleton had won the sprint competition at the Commonwealth Games in Melbourne a few weeks earlier, and suggested that the short time between events had impacted her performance. She also praised Tsylinskaya, saying "Natallia is phenomenal. When she’s on form there’s no-one that really comes that close."

== Results ==
=== Qualifying ===
Qualifying took place on Friday 14 April 2006, starting at 10:00. The qualifying round was a flying 200m time trial. All riders who completed qualifying would progress in the competition, with the top four skipping the 1/16 finals and proceeding directly to the 1/8 final. Zhang Lei received a warning for arriving late to the start.

Qualifying results
Rank	Name	Nation	Time	Behind	Notes
1	Natallia Tsylinskaya	Belarus	11.052		Q
2	Guo Shuang	China	11.268	+0.216	Q
3	Simona Krupeckaitė	Lithuania	11.365	+0.313	Q
4	Clara Sanchez	France	11.414	+0.362	Q
5	Lisandra Guerra	Cuba	11.428	+0.376	Q
6	Victoria Pendleton	Great Britain	11.432	+0.380	Q
7	Elisa Frisoni	Italy	11.444	+0.392	Q
8	Yvonne Hijgenaar	Netherlands	11.507	+0.455	Q
9	Tamilla Abassova	Russia	11.558	+0.506	Q
10	Dana Glöss	Germany	11.589	+0.537	Q
11	Magdalena Sara	Poland	11.622	+0.570	Q
12	Anna Meares	Australia	11.625	+0.573	Q
13	Gong Jinjie	China	11.657	+0.605	Q
14	Christin Muche	Germany	11.703	+0.651	Q
15	Diana García	Colombia	11.729	+0.677	Q
16	Jennie Reed	United States	11.755	+0.703	Q
17	Zhang Lei	China	11.777	+0.725	Q
18	Kerrie Meares	Australia	11.805	+0.753	Q
19	Céline Nivert	France	11.869	+0.817	Q
20	Miriam Welte	Germany	12.074	+1.022	Q
	Nancy Contreras	Mexico			DNS

=== 1/16 Finals ===
The 1/16 finals took place on Friday 14 April 2006, starting at 11:30. Each heat consisted of a single three-lap race between two riders, with the winning rider proceeding to the next round.

1/16 Final Results
Heat	Rank	Name	Nation	Notes
1	1	Lisandra Guerra	Cuba	Q
1	2	Miriam Welte	Germany	
2	1	Victoria Pendleton	Great Britain	Q
2	2	Céline Nivert	France	
3	1	Elisa Frisoni	Italy	Q
3	2	Kerrie Meares	Australia	
4	1	Zhang Lei	China	Q
4	2	Yvonne Hijgenaar	Netherlands	
5	1	Jennie Reed	United States	Q
5	2	Tamilla Abassova	Russia	
6	1	Dana Glöss	Germany	Q
6	2	Diana García	Colombia	
7	1	Christin Muche	Germany	Q
7	2	Magdalena Sara	Poland	
8	1	Anna Meares	Australia	Q
8	2	Gong Jinjie	China	

=== 1/8 Finals ===
The 1/8 finals took place on Friday 14 April 2006, starting at 12:20. Each heat consisted of a single three-lap race between two riders, with the winning rider advancing to the quarterfinals. Riders who lost in this round got a second chance to qualify for the quarterfinals in a repechage round.

1/8 Final Results
Heat	Rank	Name	Nation	Notes
1	1	Natallia Tsylinskaya	Belarus	Q
1	2	Anna Meares	Australia	
2	1	Guo Shuang	China	Q
2	2	Christin Muche	Germany	
3	1	Simona Krupeckaitė	Lithuania	Q
3	2	Dana Glöss	Germany	
4	1	Clara Sanchez	France	Q
4	2	Jennie Reed	United States	
5	1	Lisandra Guerra	Cuba	Q
5	2	Zhang Lei	China	
6	1	Victoria Pendleton	Great Britain	Q
6	2	Elisa Frisoni	Italy	

=== 1/8 Finals Repechages ===
The 1/8 finals repechage took place on Friday 14 April 2006, starting at 13:00. Each heat in this round consisted of a single three-lap race between three riders, with the winning rider advancing to the quarterfinals.

1/8 Final Repechage Results
Heat	Rank	Name	Nation	Notes
1	1	Jennie Reed	United States	Q
1	2	Elisa Frisoni	Italy	
1	3	Anna Meares	Australia	
2	1	Dana Glöss	Germany	Q
2	2	Christin Muche	Germany	
2	3	Zhang Lei	China	

=== Quarterfinals ===
The quarterfinals took place on Friday 14 April 2006, starting at 18:00. Each heat was a best-of-three competition between two riders, with riders needing to win two three-lap races to win their heat and proceed to the semifinals. Riders who lost their heats would race again in a minor final to decide 5th–8th places. During this round Lisandra Guerra received a warning from the commissaires for riding on the blue band.

Quarterfinal Results
Heat	Rank	Name	Nation	Race 1	Race 2	Decider	Notes
1	1	Natallia Tsylinskaya	Belarus	X	X		Q
1	2	Dana Glöss	Germany				
2	1	Guo Shuang	China	X	X		Q
2	2	Jennie Reed	United States				
3	1	Victoria Pendleton	Great Britain	X		X	Q
3	2	Simona Krupeckaitė	Lithuania		X		
4	1	Clara Sanchez	France		X	X	Q
4	2	Lisandra Guerra	Cuba	X			

=== Race for 5th–8th Places ===
The race for 5th–8th places took place on Friday 14 April 2006, starting at 19:55. All four riders competed in a single three-lap race.

Race for 5th–8th Place Results
Rank	Name	Nation	Notes
5	Simona Krupeckaitė	Lithuania	
6	Dana Glöss	Germany	
7	Jennie Reed	United States	
8	Lisandra Guerra	Cuba	

=== Semifinals ===
The semifinals took place on Saturday 15 April 2006, starting at 15:35. Each heat was a best-of-three competition between two riders, with riders needing to win two three-lap races to win their heat and compete in the gold medal final. The losing riders would compete for the bronze medal.

Semifinal Results
Heat	Rank	Name	Nation	Race 1	Race 2	Decider	Notes
1	1	Natallia Tsylinskaya	Belarus	X	X		Q
1	2	Clara Sanchez	France				
2	1	Victoria Pendleton	Great Britain	X	X		Q
2	2	Guo Shuang	China				

=== Finals ===
The finals took place on Saturday 15 April 2006, starting at 17:15. The finals followed the same best-of-three format as the quarterfinals and semifinals.

Final results
Rank	Name	Nation	Race 1	Race 2	Decider
Gold medal race
1st place, gold medalist(s)	Natallia Tsylinskaya	Belarus	X	X	
2nd place, silver medalist(s)	Victoria Pendleton	Great Britain			
Bronze medal race
3rd place, bronze medalist(s)	Guo Shuang	China	X	X	
4	Clara Sanchez	France			
