= UCI Track Cycling World Championships – Women's team sprint =

Women's team sprint is a track cycling event contested by teams of two women cyclists prior to 2021, and teams of three women since that point. It was introduced as an annual world championship event in 2007. It was added to the Olympic programme in 2012. The format consists of two rounds: in the first round, teams compete against the clock to set a qualifying time. The top four teams go through to the final round, where the first and second placed teams compete against each other in the gold medal race-off and the third and fourth teams compete against each other in the bronze medal race-off.

As of 2025, Germany has been the most successful team, having won the event eight times, and placed third five times. Pauline Grabosch is the most successful cyclist in the event's history, with five gold medals.

== Medalists ==
Championship	Winner	Runner-up	Third
2007 Palma de Mallorca	Victoria Pendleton; Shanaze Reade; Great Britain	Yvonne Hijgenaar; Willy Kanis; Netherlands	Kristine Bayley; Anna Meares; Australia
2008 Manchester	Victoria Pendleton; Shanaze Reade; Great Britain	Gong Jinjie; Zheng Lulu; China	Miriam Welte; Dana Glöss; Germany
2009 Pruszków	Kaarle McCulloch; Anna Meares; Australia	Victoria Pendleton; Shanaze Reade; Great Britain	Gintarė Gaivenytė; Simona Krupeckaitė; Lithuania
2010 Ballerup	Kaarle McCulloch; Anna Meares; Australia	Gong Jinjie; Lin Junhong; China	Gintarė Gaivenytė; Simona Krupeckaitė; Lithuania
2011 Apeldoorn	Kaarle McCulloch; Anna Meares; Australia	Victoria Pendleton; Jessica Varnish; Great Britain	Gong Jinjie; Guo Shuang; China
2012 Melbourne	Kristina Vogel; Miriam Welte; Germany	Kaarle McCulloch; Anna Meares; Australia	Gong Jinjie; Guo Shuang; China
2013 Minsk	Kristina Vogel; Miriam Welte; Germany	Gong Jinjie; Guo Shuang; China	Rebecca James; Victoria Williamson; Great Britain
2014 Cali	Kristina Vogel; Miriam Welte; Germany	Lin Junhong; Zhong Tianshi; China	Rebecca James; Jessica Varnish; Great Britain
2015 Yvelines	Gong Jinjie; Zhong Tianshi; China	Daria Shmeleva; Anastasiia Voinova; Russia	Kaarle McCulloch; Anna Meares; Australia
2016 London	Daria Shmeleva; Anastasia Voynova; Russia	Gong Jinjie; Zhong Tianshi; China	Miriam Welte; Kristina Vogel; Germany
2017 Hong Kong	Daria Shmeleva; Anastasia Voynova; Russia	Kaarle McCulloch; Stephanie Morton; Australia	Miriam Welte; Kristina Vogel; Germany
2018 Apeldoorn	Kristina Vogel; Miriam Welte; Pauline Grabosch; Germany	Kyra Lamberink; Shanne Braspennincx; Laurine van Riessen; Hetty van de Wouw; Netherlands	Daria Shmeleva; Anastasia Voynova; Russia
2019 Pruszków	Kaarle McCulloch; Stephanie Morton; Australia	Daria Shmeleva; Anastasia Voynova; Russia	Miriam Welte; Emma Hinze; Germany
2020 Berlin	Pauline Grabosch; Emma Hinze; Lea Friedrich; Germany	Kaarle McCulloch; Stephanie Morton; Australia	Chen Feifei; Zhong Tianshi; China
2021 Roubaix	Lea Friedrich; Pauline Grabosch; Emma Hinze; Germany	Natalia Antonova; Daria Shmeleva; Yana Tyshchenko; Anastasia Voynova; Russian Cycling Federation	Sophie Capewell; Blaine Ridge-Davis; Milly Tanner; Lauren Bate; Great Britain
2022 Saint-Quentin-en-Yvelines	Pauline Grabosch; Emma Hinze; Lea Friedrich; Germany	Bao Shanju; Guo Yufang; Yuan Liying; China	Lauren Bell; Sophie Capewell; Emma Finucane; Great Britain
2023 Glasgow	Pauline Grabosch; Emma Hinze; Lea Friedrich; Germany	Lauren Bell; Sophie Capewell; Emma Finucane; Great Britain	Guo Yufang; Bao Shanju; Yuan Liying; China
2024 Ballerup	Katy Marchant; Sophie Capewell; Emma Finucane; Great Britain	Kimberly Kalee; Hetty van de Wouw; Steffie van der Peet; Kyra Lamberink; Netherlands	Molly McGill; Kristina Clonan; Alessia McCaig; Australia
2025 Santiago	Kimberly Kalee; Hetty van de Wouw; Steffie van der Peet; Netherlands	Emma Finucane; Iona Moir; Rhianna Parris-Smith; Great Britain	Alessia McCaig; Molly McGill; Kristine Perkins; Liliya Tatarinoff; Australia
2026 Shanghai	Jiang Yulu; Tong Mengqi; Yuan Liying; Luo Xuehuang; China	Sophie Capewell; Emma Finucane; Rhianna Parris-Smith; Great Britain	Lea Friedrich; Pauline Grabosch; Clara Schneider; Germany

== Medal table ==
Rank	Nation	Gold	Silver	Bronze	Total
1	Germany	8	0	5	13
2	Australia	4	3	4	11
3	Great Britain	3	5	4	12
4	China	2	6	4	12
5	Russia	2	2	1	5
6	Netherlands	1	3	0	4
7	Russian Cycling Federation	0	1	0	1
8	Lithuania	0	0	2	2
Totals (8 entries)		20	20	20	60
