= 2010 UCI Track Cycling World Championships – Women's sprint =

Women's sprint at the 2010 UCI Track Cycling World Championships
- Venue: Ballerup Super Arena, Ballerup
- Date: 26–27 March 2010
- Competitors: 27 from 14 nations

Medalists
| gold medal | Victoria Pendleton | Great Britain |
| silver medal | Guo Shuang | China |
| bronze medal | Simona Krupeckaitė | Lithuania |

Rainbow jersey

The Women's Sprint was one of the nine women's events at the 2010 UCI Track Cycling World Championships, held in Ballerup, Denmark.

27 cyclists from 14 countries participated in the contest. After the qualifying heats, the fastest 24 riders were to advance to the 1/16 finals.

The first rider in each of the 12 heats advanced to the second round. There was no repechage for this round.

The first rider from each of the six Second Round heats advanced to the Quarterfinals and the second placed riders from a repechage to determine the other two riders that competed the quarterfinals.

The first rider in each quarterfinal advanced to the semifinals and the 4 losing athletes faced a race for 5th-8th place.

The qualifying, first round, second round, second round repechages and quarterfinals took place on 26 March. The Semifinals and Finals took place on 27 March.

== World record ==
World record
| WR | 10.831 | Olga Slyusareva (RUS) | Moscow (Russia) | 25 April 1993 |

== Results ==
=== Qualifying ===
| Rank | Name | Nation | Time | Notes |
|---|---|---|---|---|
| 1 | Guo Shuang | China | 10.918 | Q |
| 2 | Anna Meares | Australia | 11.030 | Q |
| 3 | Olga Panarina | Belarus | 11.077 | Q |
| 4 | Simona Krupeckaitė | Lithuania | 11.078 | Q |
| 5 | Willy Kanis | Netherlands | 11.105 | Q |
| 6 | Clara Sanchez | France | 11.120 | Q |
| 7 | Victoria Pendleton | Great Britain | 11.135 | Q |
| 8 | Kaarle McCulloch | Australia | 11.202 | Q |
| 9 | Lin Junhong | China | 11.242 | Q |
| 10 | Gong Jinjie | China | 11.250 | Q |
| 11 | Virginie Cueff | France | 11.340 | Q |
| 12 | Kristina Vogel | Germany | 11.356 | Q |
| 13 | Yvonne Hijgenaar | Netherlands | 11.385 | Q |
| 14 | Miriam Welte | Germany | 11.408 | Q |
| 15 | Victoria Baranova | Russia | 11.426 | Q |
| 16 | Lyubov Shulika | Ukraine | 11.442 | Q |
| 17 | Emily Rosemond | Australia | 11.444 | Q |
| 18 | Jessica Varnish | Great Britain | 11.464 | Q |
| 19 | Becky James | Great Britain | 11.518 | Q |
| 20 | Sandie Clair | France | 11.559 | Q |
| 21 | Lee Wai Sze | Hong Kong | 11.564 | Q |
| 22 | Christin Muche | Germany | 11.571 | Q |
| 23 | Lisandra Guerra | Cuba | 11.600 | Q |
| 24 | Olga Streltsova | Russia | 11.700 | Q |
| 25 | Renata Dąbrowska | Poland | 11.922 | |
| 26 | Helena Casas Roige | Spain | 11.995 | |
| 27 | Gintarė Gaivenytė | Lithuania | 12.084 | |

=== 1/16 Finals ===
| Heat | Rank | Name | Nation | Time | Notes |
|---|---|---|---|---|---|
| 1 | 1 | Guo Shuang | China | 11.914 | Q |
| 1 | 2 | Olga Streltsova | Russia | | |
| 2 | 1 | Anna Meares | Australia | 11.682 | Q |
| 2 | 2 | Lisandra Guerra | Cuba | | |
| 3 | 1 | Olga Panarina | Belarus | 12.114 | Q |
| 3 | 2 | Christin Muche | Germany | | |
| 4 | 1 | Simona Krupeckaitė | Lithuania | 11.782 | Q |
| 4 | 2 | Lee Wai Sze | Hong Kong | | |
| 5 | 1 | Willy Kanis | Netherlands | 11.418 | Q |
| 5 | 2 | Sandie Clair | France | | |
| 6 | 1 | Clara Sanchez | France | 11.874 | Q |
| 6 | 2 | Becky James | Great Britain | | |
| 7 | 1 | Victoria Pendleton | Great Britain | 11.794 | Q |
| 7 | 2 | Jessica Varnish | Great Britain | | |
| 8 | 1 | Kaarle McCulloch | Australia | 11.577 | Q |
| 8 | 2 | Emily Rosemond | Australia | | |
| 9 | 1 | Lyubov Shulika | Ukraine | 11.693 | Q |
| 9 | 2 | Lin Junhong | China | | |
| 10 | 1 | Victoria Baranova | Russia | 11.898 | Q |
| 10 | 2 | Gong Jinjie | China | | |
| 11 | 1 | Virginie Cueff | France | 11.848 | Q |
| 11 | 2 | Miriam Welte | Germany | | REL |
| 12 | 1 | Kristina Vogel | Germany | 11.813 | Q |
| 12 | 2 | Yvonne Hijgenaar | Netherlands | | |

=== 1/8 Finals ===
| Heat | Rank | Name | Nation | Time | Notes |
|---|---|---|---|---|---|
| 1 | 1 | Guo Shuang | China | 11.804 | Q |
| 1 | 2 | Kristina Vogel | Germany | | |
| 2 | 1 | Anna Meares | Australia | 11.717 | Q |
| 2 | 2 | Virginie Cueff | France | | |
| 3 | 1 | Victoria Baranova | Russia | 11.763 | Q |
| 3 | 2 | Olga Panarina | Belarus | | |
| 4 | 1 | Simona Krupeckaitė | Lithuania | 11.660 | Q |
| 4 | 2 | Lyubov Shulika | Ukraine | | |
| 5 | 1 | Kaarle McCulloch | Australia | 11.536 | Q |
| 5 | 2 | Willy Kanis | Netherlands | | |
| 6 | 1 | Victoria Pendleton | Great Britain | 11.552 | Q |
| 6 | 2 | Clara Sanchez | France | | |

=== 1/8 Finals Repechage ===
| Heat | Rank | Name | Nation | Time | Notes |
|---|---|---|---|---|---|
| 1 | 1 | Kristina Vogel | Germany | 11.837 | Q |
| 1 | 2 | Clara Sanchez | France | | |
| 1 | 3 | Lyubov Shulika | Ukraine | | |
| 2 | 1 | Olga Panarina | Belarus | 11.600 | Q |
| 2 | 2 | Willy Kanis | Netherlands | | |
| 2 | 3 | Virginie Cueff | France | | |

=== Quarterfinals ===
| Heat | Rank | Name | Nation | Race 1 | Race 2 | Decider | Notes |
|---|---|---|---|---|---|---|---|
| 1 | 1 | Guo Shuang | China | 11.322 | 11.353 | | Q |
| 1 | 2 | Olga Panarina | Belarus | | | | |
| 2 | 1 | Anna Meares | Australia | 11.587 | REL | 11.704 | Q |
| 2 | 2 | Kristina Vogel | Germany | | 11.982 | | |
| 3 | 1 | Victoria Pendleton | Great Britain | 11.755 | 11.843 | | Q |
| 3 | 2 | Victoria Baranova | Russia | | | | |
| 4 | 1 | Simona Krupeckaitė | Lithuania | 11.671 | 15.102 | | Q |
| 4 | 2 | Kaarle McCulloch | Australia | | | | |

=== Race for 5th-8th Places ===
| Rank | Name | Nation | Time |
|---|---|---|---|
| 5 | Kristina Vogel | Germany | 11.757 |
| 6 | Kaarle McCulloch | Australia | |
| 7 | Olga Panarina | Belarus | |
| 8 | Victoria Baranova | Russia | |

=== Semifinals ===
| Heat | Rank | Name | Nation | Race 1 | Race 2 | Decider | Notes |
|---|---|---|---|---|---|---|---|
| 1 | 1 | Guo Shuang | China | | 11.274 | 11.485 | Q |
| 1 | 2 | Simona Krupeckaitė | Lithuania | 11.480 | | | |
| 2 | 1 | Victoria Pendleton | Great Britain | 11.316 | 11.248 | | Q |
| 2 | 2 | Anna Meares | Australia | | | | |

=== Finals ===
| Rank | Name | Nation | Race 1 | Race 2 | Decider |
|---|---|---|---|---|---|
Gold Medal Races
| 1st place, gold medalist(s) | Victoria Pendleton | Great Britain | 11.611 | 11.543 | |
| 2nd place, silver medalist(s) | Guo Shuang | China | | | |
Bronze Medal Races
| 3rd place, bronze medalist(s) | Simona Krupeckaitė | Lithuania | 11.377 | 11.416 | |
| 4 | Anna Meares | Australia | | | |
