= UCI Track Cycling World Championships – Women's keirin =

The UCI Track Cycling World Championships – Women's keirin is the women's world championship keirin event held annually at the UCI Track Cycling World Championships. It was first held at the 2002 championships in Copenhagen, Denmark. As of 2019, Anna Meares from Australia and Kristina Vogel from Germany share the most titles, with three each.

== Medalists ==
Championships	Gold	Silver	Bronze
2002 Copenhagen	Li Na (CHN)	Clara Sanchez (FRA)	Rosealee Hubbard (AUS)
2003 Stuttgart	Svetlana Grankovskaya (RUS)	Anna Meares (AUS)	Oksana Grichina (RUS)
2004 Melbourne	Clara Sanchez (FRA)	Elisa Frisoni (ITA)	Jennie Reed (USA)
2005 Los Angeles	Clara Sanchez (FRA)	Elisa Frisoni (ITA)	Yvonne Hijgenaar (NED)
2006 Bordeaux	Christin Muche (GER)	Clara Sanchez (FRA)	Guo Shuang (CHN)
2007 Palma de Mallorca	Victoria Pendleton (GBR)	Guo Shuang (CHN)	Anna Meares (AUS)
2008 Manchester	Jennie Reed (USA)	Victoria Pendleton (GBR)	Christin Muche (GER)
2009 Pruszków	Guo Shuang (CHN)	Clara Sanchez (FRA)	Willy Kanis (NED)
2010 Ballerup	Simona Krupeckaitė (LTU)	Victoria Pendleton (GBR)	Olga Panarina (BLR)
2011 Apeldoorn	Anna Meares (AUS)	Olga Panarina (BLR)	Clara Sanchez (FRA)
2012 Melbourne	Anna Meares (AUS)	Ekaterina Gnidenko (RUS)	Kristina Vogel (GER)
2013 Minsk	Becky James (GBR)	Gong Jinjie (CHN)	Lisandra Guerra (CUB)
2014 Cali	Kristina Vogel (GER)	Anna Meares (AUS)	Becky James (GBR)
2015 Yvelines	Anna Meares (AUS)	Shanne Braspennincx (NED)	Lisandra Guerra (CUB)
2016 London	Kristina Vogel (GER)	Anna Meares (AUS)	Becky James (GBR)
2017 Hong Kong	Kristina Vogel (GER)	Martha Bayona (COL)	Nicky Degrendele (BEL)
2018 Apeldoorn	Nicky Degrendele (BEL)	Lee Wai Sze (HKG)	Simona Krupeckaitė (LTU)
2019 Pruszków	Lee Wai Sze (HKG)	Kaarle McCulloch (AUS)	Daria Shmeleva (RUS)
2020 Berlin	Emma Hinze (GER)	Lee Wai Sze (HKG)	Stephanie Morton (AUS)
2021 Roubaix	Lea Friedrich (GER)	Mina Sato (JPN)	Yana Tyshchenko (RCF)
2022 Saint-Quentin-en-Yvelines	Lea Friedrich (GER)	Mina Sato (JPN)	Steffie van der Peet (NED)
2023 Glasgow	Ellesse Andrews (NZL)	Martha Bayona (COL)	Lea Friedrich (GER)
2024 Ballerup	Mina Sato (JPN)	Hetty van de Wouw (NED)	Katy Marchant (GBR)
2025 Santiago	Mina Sato (JPN)	Emma Finucane (GBR)	Stefany Cuadrado (COL)
2026 Shanghai	Alina Lysenko (AIN)	Lea Friedrich (GER)	Emma Finucane (GBR)

== Medal table ==
Rank	Nation	Gold	Silver	Bronze	Total
1	Germany	7	1	3	11
2	Australia	3	4	3	10
3	Great Britain	2	3	4	9
4	France	2	3	1	6
5	China	2	2	1	5
6	Japan	2	2	0	4
7	Hong Kong	1	2	0	3
8	Russia	1	1	2	4
9	Belgium	1	0	1	2
9	Lithuania	1	0	1	2
9	United States	1	0	1	2
12	New Zealand	1	0	0	1
–	Individual Neutral Athletes	1	0	0	1
13	Netherlands	0	2	3	5
14	Colombia	0	2	1	3
15	Italy	0	2	0	2
16	Belarus	0	1	1	2
17	Cuba	0	0	2	2
18	Russian Cycling Federation	0	0	1	1
Totals (18 entries)		25	25	25	75

== See also ==
- UCI Track Cycling World Championships – Women's sprint
- UCI Track Cycling World Championships – Men's keirin
