= 2008 UCI Track Cycling World Championships – Women's team sprint =

Rainbow jersey

The Women's Team Sprint was one of the 8 women's events at the 2008 UCI Track Cycling World Championships, held in Manchester, United Kingdom.

Ten teams of 2 cyclists each participated in the contest. After the qualifying, the fastest 2 teams raced for gold, and 3rd and 4th teams raced for bronze.

The Qualifying and the Finals were held on the evening session on 27 March.

== Qualifying ==
Rank	Team	Lap 1	Time	Speed (km/h)	Q
Rank	Team	Lap 1	Lap 1-2	Speed (km/h)	Q
1	Great Britain	19.088 (1)	33.186	54.239	QF
	Victoria Pendleton; Shanaze Reade		14.098 (1)		
2	China	19.138 (2)	33.43	53.030	QF
	Gong Jinjie; Zheng Lulu		14.805 (4)		
3	Germany	19.415 (4)	34.135	52.731	QB
	Dana Glöss; Miriam Welte		14.720 (2)		
4	France	19.266 (3)	34.165	52.685	QB
	Sandie Clair; Virginie Cueff		14.899 (5)		
5	Russia	20.133 (6)	34.867	51.624	
	Swetlana Grankowskaja; Oksana Grishina		14.734 (3)		
6	Italy	20.082 (5)	35.414	50.827	
	Valentina Alessio; Elisa Frisoni		15.332 (6)		
7	Thailand	21.658 (7)	37.752	47.679	
	Luekajorh Wathinee; Maneephan Jutatip		16.094 (7)		

== Finals ==
Rank	Team	Lap 1	Time	Speed (km/h)
Rank	Team	Lap 1	Lap 1-2	Speed (km/h)
Gold Medal Race
	Great Britain	19.455 (2)	33.661	53.474
	Victoria Pendleton; Shanaze Reade		14.206 (1)	
	China	19.414 (1)	34.223	52.596
	Gong Jinjie; Zheng Lulu		14.809 (2)	
Bronze Medal Race
	Germany	13.112 (1)	34.036	52.885
	Dana Glöss; Miriam Welte		20.924 (1)	
4	France	13.133 (2)	34.234	52.579
	Sandie Clair; Virginie Cueff		21.101 (2)	
