= Shanaze Reade =

English bicycle motocross rider and track cyclist (born 1988)

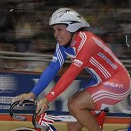
- Reade in 2008

Personal information
- Full name: Shanaze Danielle Reade
- Born: 23 September 1988 (age 38) Crewe, Cheshire, United Kingdom
- Height: 1.70 m (5 ft 7 in)
- Weight: 70 kg (154 lb)

Cycling career
- Sport: Cycling
- Disciplines: Bicycle Motocross (BMX); Track
- Role: Racer
- Rider type: BMX: Off Road; Track: Sprinter

Amateur teams
- 2001–2003: Bulldog Bikes UK
- 2004–2005: Team Persil BMX
- 2005–2006: SIS/Adidas
- 2006: Koxx Racing

Professional teams
- 2007–2008: Redline Bicycles
- 2008–2013: Team Sky+ HD
- 2015 – 2017: Madison Genesis
Medal record
Representing Great Britain
Women's BMX racing
Event	1st	2nd	3rd
World Championships	4	1	0
World Junior Championships	1	0	0
World Cup rounds	8	2	0
Total	13	3	0
World Championships
Gold medal – first place	2007 Victoria	BMX racing
Gold medal – first place	2008 Taiyuan	BMX racing
Gold medal – first place	2010 Pietermaritzburg	BMX racing
Gold medal – first place	2011 Copenhagen	BMX time trial
Silver medal – second place	2012 Birmingham	BMX time trial
World Junior Championships
Gold medal – first place	2006 São Paulo	BMX racing
Women's track cycling
Event	1st	2nd	3rd
World Championships	2	1	0
Total	2	1	0
World Championships
Gold medal – first place	2007 Palma de Mallorca	Team sprint
Gold medal – first place	2008 Manchester	Team sprint
Silver medal – second place	2009 Pruszków	Team sprint

Shanaze Danielle Reade (born 23 September 1988 in Crewe, Cheshire, United Kingdom) is a British former bicycle motocross (BMX) racer and track cyclist whose prime competitive years began in 2002. She has won the UCI BMX World Championships three times.

== Early years ==
Reade was born in England to a Jamaican father and an Irish mother. She was primarily raised by her grandparents after her mother gave birth to her at the age of 17. She has credited her grandfather with giving her the self-confidence to achieve success in her cycling career. Reade began racing in 1998 at the age of 10, at Tipkinder Park in Crewe. A local track operator named Bob Field, whose son also raced at the time, became her mentor. She was previously a Track & Field enthusiast but apparently got bored with 100-metre sprint running and the Shot Put after five years in those sports before discovering BMX.

== BMX career to 2007 ==
In 2005, she raced the National series with the men all year, despite being only 17 years old. She commented on racing against men in a Descent World interview:

I am usually always top 3 when racing the guys. I have been racing them now for 2 years and I was almost the National Champion last year though had to settle for the No 2 spot. The boys in BMX are all cool, some spit their dummies out but I just let them get on with it! It's really quite fun to watch when I kick their booties.

Reade fractured her knee two weeks before the UCI World Championships in July 2005 at a national event in England. She raced the World Championships with her knee wrapped up and on pain killers but crashed in the quarter-finals.

Known for her power, she developed her strength racing against boys and older amateurs, including men up to the present time. She won her first professional race in the Girls Pro at the American Bicycle Association (ABA) Winternationals in Phoenix, Arizona on 1 April 2006. She also won the following day. In 2006, she became British National No.1 in 19 & Over Elite Men after racing the National series with men all year, despite being only 17 at the time, 1.72 metres tall and 76 kg.

In June 2006, Reade broke a metatarsal bone in practice. Her first race back was the 2006 European Championships where she competed only in the last two race events before the final Event. The cast came off four days before the European Championships Final Event.

She won the World Championships in Brazil in August 2006 despite an earlier injury to her foot.

Her BMX victories at junior level include three World, eight European and five British BMX championships. Reade is also a champion track racer, riding on Velodromes. In July 2007 she became the Women's Senior UCI BMX World Champion and at the 2007 UCI Track World Championships, she won the gold in the women's team sprint with Victoria Pendleton. It was only her second track race ever. Not only was she the first ever to win a track championship in her rookie year, she completed the feat after only six weeks of training. She had originally taken up the sport to keep her fit for BMX competition.

== Track racing ==
Reade started track racing on 24 February 2007, her first ever competition on the velodrome was in the Manchester round of the 2006–2007 UCI Track Cycling World Cup Classics. She took second place with Anna Blyth in the Team Sprint in a time of 34.294 seconds. The Gold Medal-winning Dutch team of Yvonne Hijgenaar and Willy Kanis' time was 33.966 seconds. Like Reade, Kanis is also a champion BMX racer. Reade and Blyth's qualifying time was the fastest of the event at 33.802 seconds. In the final round, the Dutch team made a false start, however, Reade didn't notice the call back to the start and completed a lap at full sprint. In a post race interview, Reade said:

"...The first run in the final (the false start) definitely took a lot out of me because I got halfway down the back straight the second time and my legs were burning bad. I could never have dreamed I'd come away with a Silver medal in my first World Cup though."

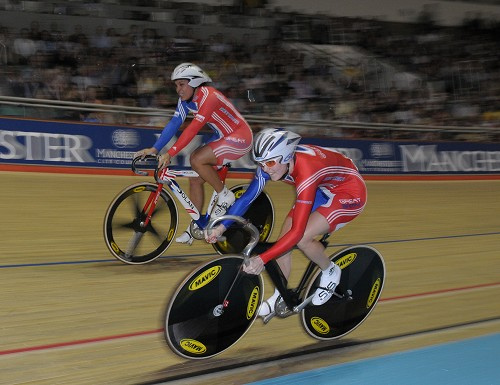
Reade and Victoria Pendleton in 2008

A month later, on 29 March, Reade went on to take first place in Team Sprint at the UCI Track Cycling World Championships in Palma de Mallorca along with Victoria Pendleton. It was also the first ever Women's Team Sprint Gold Medal title in that event. Their winning time was 33.631 seconds. Reade was a last minute replacement for Anna Blyth, Reade's partner at her first track racing event a month prior.

This success in Velodrome racing follows the example of the former professional BMX racer, Jamie Staff, who had a successful career both in Velodrome track racing and BMX racing. At the 2008 UCI Track Cycling World Championships in Manchester, she again won the gold in the women's team sprint with Pendleton. On 20 November 2007 Reade was named The Sunday Times Young Sportswoman of the Year.

== Olympic Games ==
Reade is still active in track racing but concentrated on BMX for the event's first inclusion in the Olympic Games in 2008. Having successfully defended her crown at the 2008 world championships, Reade was named the sole woman member of the United Kingdom BMX Olympic team by British Cycling on 9 July 2008. She was the favourite to win the gold medal in the women's BMX event.

She crashed in the first qualifying heat time trial, but the second heat saw Reade set second fastest time. As the best of both times was counted; she advanced to the semi-finals. They were run in three heats, with riders accumulating points dependent on placings. Despite crashing in the first heat, Reade gained enough points to put her through to the final. The final round saw Reade ride slightly more conservatively conceding the lead to Anne-Caroline Chausson on the first berm. She crashed again on the final berm when she clipped Chausson's rear wheel, conceding the chance of a medal. She did not finish the race.

== Return to the track ==
On 16 March 2009, Reade was selected in the British squad for the World Track Cycling Championships in Pruszków, Poland, where she once again competed alongside Victoria Pendleton in the Women's Sprint and Team Sprint events. In 2009 however Reade and Pendleton failed to retain their team crown, winning only a silver after losing out to Kaarle McCulloch and Anna Meares of Australia. Reade was philosophical after this setback telling BBC Sport "I did the best possible ride I could do on the day so I'm really happy."

In April 2015 it was announced that Reade was re-joining the Great Britain track squad after a period based in the United States competing in BMX. Subsequently, in August 2015 the Madison Genesis team announced that Reade would ride for them during the 2015–16 track cycling season as part of her preparation for the 2016 Summer Olympics.

== Olympics 2012 ==
Reade again represented Great Britain in the women's BMX event for the London 2012 Olympics. Having placed second, first and second in the three heat semi-final she finished a disappointing sixth in the final.

== Retirement and comeback ==
In April 2017 Reade announced her retirement from competition, after she had been dropped from British Cycling's elite squad: in a 2021 interview she said this had forced her into retirement as British Cycling's medical team believed that she would not be able to compete at the Tokyo Olympics as she had had her shoulder operated on five times.

After her retirement she became a fitness coach. However, the period after her retirement was marked by a bout of alcoholism and weight gain, which she was able to recover from after joining Alcoholics Anonymous. In August 2018 she returned to training at British Cycling, after being invited several times by performance director Stephen Park. In a January 2019 interview, Reade explained that she was returning to competition for "closure" after feeling that her physical and mental condition were sub-optimal at the time of her retirement, adding that she was now treating the sport as a hobby and not accepting funding for her cycling. That month she won the British National Team Sprint Championships alongside Blaine Ridge-Davis - her first national title in any discipline. However, a few days afterwards she was ruled out of selection for the 2019 UCI Track Cycling World Championships due to a rule changed which required competitors at the world championships to have competed in that season's World Cup: the team sprint squad that Team GB sent to the world championships was unable to secure qualification for the Olympics in the event. Reade subsequently retired from competition for a second time. She has stated that she was subsequently approached by the British Bobsleigh and Skeleton Association to enquire whether she would consider competing in bobsleigh with a view to being part of the British squad at the 2022 Winter Olympics, but that she had turned them down.

Aside from fitness coaching, she also serves as West Midlands cycling and walking ambassador, and also acts as a brand ambassador for a number of companies including HSBC. In 2020 she was appointed as a co-opted member of the board of directors for the 2023 UCI Cycling World Championships in Glasgow and in June 2021 she was also announced as an ambassador for the 2023 Worlds.

In 2026, Reade guest starred in the Makeover Challenge episode of RuPaul's Drag Race: UK vs. the World season three where they were paired with German drag queen The Only Naomy.

== Titles and awards ==
=== BMX titles ===
==== Amateur ====
British Cycling

2000
11–12 Girls and 12 Girls Cruiser BCFBMX National Champion. She also came in 4th in 12 cruiser against the boys that year
2001
Senior Women's Champion
13 Girls European Champion
2003
15 Girls European Champion
2004
16 Girls European Champion
16 Girls and 18 & Under Women's Cruiser World Champion
2005
18 & Under Women's Cruiser European Champion
17 Expert European Champion
2006
Junior Elite Women European Champion

==== Professional ====
British Cycling

2002
Superclass girl National Champion
2003
Superclass girl National Champion
2006
19 & Over Elite Men British National No.1

Union Cycliste Internationale

2006
Junior Women World Champion
2007
Elite Women World Champion
Elite Women European Champion
Elite Women Supercross World Cup Champion – This was the "Good Luck, Beijing" race held on 22 August 2007 on the Olympic track in Beijing, China exactly 362 days before BMX Olympic competition started in Beijing.
2008
Elite Women World Champion
Elite Women Supercross World Cup Champion
2010
Elite Women World Champion
2013
1st UCI BMX Supercross World Cup – Round 1
1st UCI BMX Supercross World Cup – Round 2

=== Track results ===
2007
1st Team Sprint, World Championships, with Victoria Pendleton
2nd Team Sprint, UCI Track Cycling World Cup, with Anna Blyth
5th 500 m TT, World Championships
2008
1st Team Sprint, World Championships, with Victoria Pendleton
2015
2nd British National Team Sprint Championships, with Victoria Williamson
2019
1st British National Team Sprint Championships, with Blaine Ridge-Davis
