= 2011 UCI Track Cycling World Championships – Women's team sprint =

Woman's team cycling contest

Rainbow jersey

The Women's team sprint at the 2011 UCI Track Cycling World Championships was held on March 23. 15 nations of 2 cyclists each participated in the contest. After the qualifying, the fastest 2 teams raced for gold, and 3rd and 4th teams raced for bronze.

== Results ==
=== Qualifying ===
The Qualifying was held at 19:50.

Rank	Name	Nation	Time	Notes
1	Anna Meares; Kaarle McCulloch	Australia	33.342	Q
2	Victoria Pendleton; Jessica Varnish	United Kingdom	33.356	Q
3	Junhong Lin; Gong Jinjie	China	33.569	q
4	Clara Sanchez; Sandie Clair	France	33.601	q
5	Miriam Welte; Kristina Vogel	Germany	33.618	
6	Gintarė Gaivenytė; Simona Krupeckaitė	Lithuania	33.788	
7	Yvonne Hijgenaar; Willy Kanis	Netherlands	34.151	
8	Iryna Papezhuk; Lyubov Shulika	Ukraine	34.373	
9	Viktoria Baranova; Olga Streltsova	Russia	34.521	
10	Helena Casas; Tania Calvo	Spain	34.909	
11	Juliana Gaviria; Diana García	Colombia	35.242	
12	Lee Wai Sze; Meng Zhao Juan	Hong Kong	36.033	
13	Angeliki Koutsonikoli; Dimitra Patapi	Greece	36.087	
14	Kim Won-Gyeong; Park Eun-Mi	South Korea	36.216	
15	Ryoko Nakagawa; Kanako Kase	Japan	36.796	

=== Finals ===
The finals were held 20:45.

Rank	Name	Nation	Time
Gold medal race
1st place, gold medalist(s)	Anna Meares; Kaarle McCulloch	Australia	33.237
2nd place, silver medalist(s)	Victoria Pendleton; Jessica Varnish	United Kingdom	33.525
Bronze medal race
3rd place, bronze medalist(s)	Guo Shuang; Gong Jinjie	China	33.586
4	Clara Sanchez; Sandie Clair	France	33.731
