= Aleksandra Drejgier =

Polish cyclist

Personal information
- Born: June 15, 1991 (age 35)

Cycling career
- Sport: Cycling
- Discipline: Track cycling
- Role: Rider
- Rider type: sprinter

Aleksandra Drejgier (born 15 June 1991) is a Polish track cyclist, and part of the national team. She competed in the team sprint event at the 2009 UCI Track Cycling World Championships and also in the team sprint event at the 2010 UCI Track Cycling World Championships.
