= Cycling at the 2006 Commonwealth Games – Women's sprint =

The Women's individual sprint at the 2006 Commonwealth Games took place on March 18, 2006 at the Vodafone Arena.

== Qualification ==
Seeding is decided by a 200-metre time trial.

Rank	Rider	Time	Average Speed (km/h)
1	Victoria Pendleton (ENG)	11.275; GR	63.858
2	Anna Meares (AUS)	11.700	61.538
3	Kerrie Meares (AUS)	11.725	61.407
4	Elisabeth Williams (NZL)	11.781	61.115
5	Fiona Carswell (NZL)	11.824	60.893
6	Kate Cullen (SCO)	11.925	60.377

== Results ==
=== Quarter-finals ===
Heat	Rank	Rider	Time	Avg speed (km/h)	Notes
1	1	Victoria Pendleton (ENG)	13.527	53.226	Q
1	2	Kate Cullen (SCO)			R
2	1	Anna Meares (AUS)	12.433	57.910	Q
2	2	Fiona Carswell (NZL)			R
3	1	Kerrie Meares (AUS)	12.288	58.593	Q
3	2	Elisabeth Williams (NZL)			R

=== Quarter-finals Repechage ===
Heat	Rank	Rider	Time	Avg speed (km/h)	Notes
1	1	Elisabeth Williams (NZL)	12.303	58.522	Q
1	2	Fiona Carswell (NZL)			
1	3	Kate Cullen (SCO)			

=== Race for 5th-6th Places ===
Rank	Rider	Time	Avg speed (km/h)
5	Fiona Carswell (NZL)	12.776	56.355
6	Kate Cullen (SCO)		

=== Semi-finals ===
Heat	Rank	Rider	Race 1	Race 2	Race 3	Notes
1	1	Victoria Pendleton (ENG)	?	12.251		Q
1	2	Elisabeth Williams (NZL)				
2	1	Anna Meares (AUS)	12.014	12.430		Q
2	2	Kerrie Meares (AUS)				

=== Finals ===
Rank	Rider	Race 1	Race 2	Race 3
Bronze medal final
3rd place, bronze medalist(s)	Kerrie Meares (AUS)	12.457	12.074	
4	Elisabeth Williams (NZL)			
Gold medal final
1st place, gold medalist(s)	Victoria Pendleton (ENG)	11.822		12.216
2nd place, silver medalist(s)	Anna Meares (AUS)		12.001	
