= Anna Blyth =

English cyclist

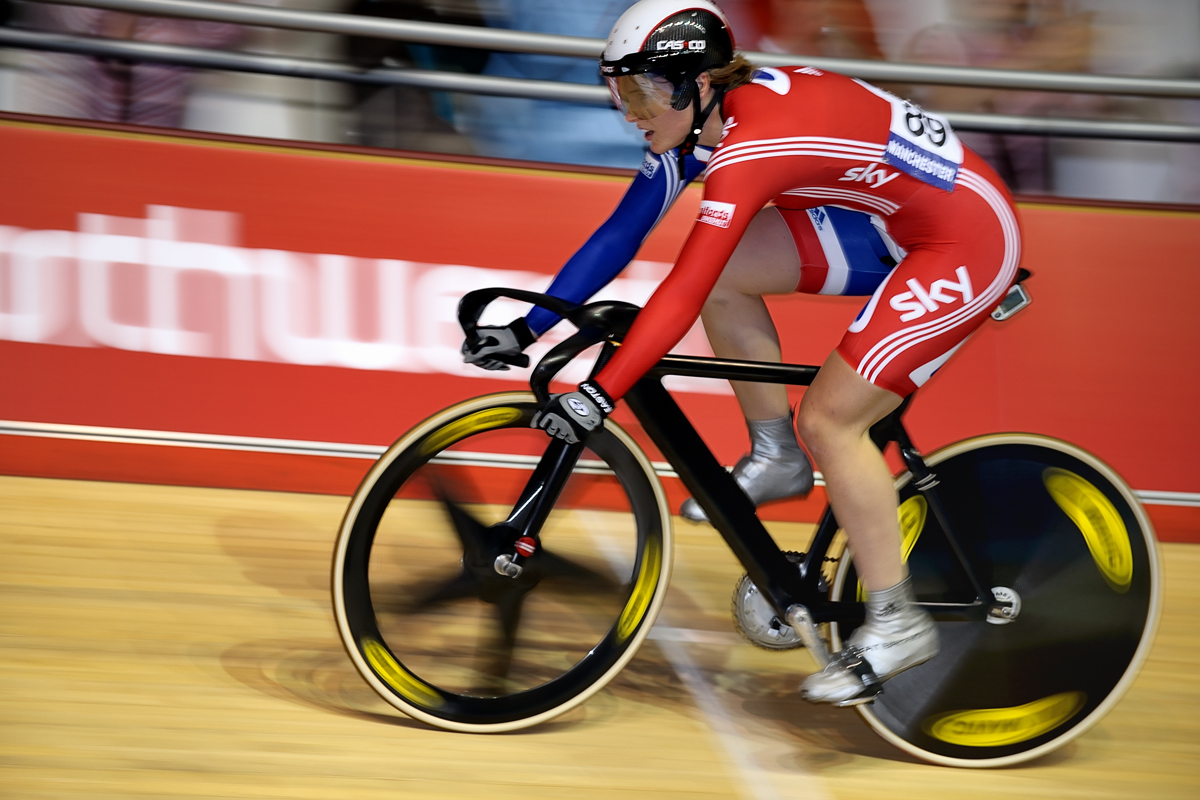

Personal information
- Full name: Anna Elizabeth Blyth
- Born: 15 May 1988 (age 38) Leeds, England, United Kingdom

Cycling career
- Sport: Cycling
- Discipline: Track
- Role: Rider
- Rider type: Keirin

Amateur team
- 2008: VC St Raphael

Major wins
- Junior Keirin World Champion

Anna Blyth (born 15 May 1988) is an English racing cyclist from Leeds. She began racing at 15, having been spotted by British Cycling at Benton Park. She joined the World Class Start Programme, becoming a member of the Olympic Development Plan and the Olympic Academy.

== Palmarès ==
2005
2nd Sprint, UCI World Track Championship, Austria – Junior
3rd Keirin, UCI World Track Championship, Austria – Junior
1st (United Kingdom) 500m TT, British National Track Championships – Junior
1st (United Kingdom) Sprint, British National Track Championships – Junior

2006
3rd 500m Time trial, European Track Championships, Germany – Under 23
1st Keirin, UCI World Track Championships, Belgium – Junior
2nd Sprint, UCI World Track Championships, Belgium – Junior
National Track Championships

2nd 500m time trial
2nd Sprint
2nd Keirin

1st (United Kingdom) Scratch race, British National Track Championships – Junior
1st (United Kingdom) 500m TT, British National Track Championships – Junior
1st (United Kingdom) Sprint, British National Track Championships – Junior

2007
1st Keirin, European Track Championships, Germany – Under 23
British National Track Championships

2nd 500m time trial
2nd Sprint
2nd Keirin

3rd 500m time trial, UCI Track World Cup, Round 4, Manchester
2nd Team sprint, UCI Track World Cup, Round 4, Manchester
4th Keirin, UCI Track Cycling World Championships

2008
British National Track Championships

1st 500m TT, British National Track Championships
1st Team Sprint (with Victoria Pendleton)

UEC European U23 Track Championships

3rd Sprint
3rd 500m Time Trial

2009
1st Scratch race, UEC European U23 Track Championships

2010
3rd Scratch race, Commonwealth Games

Sporting positions
Preceded by (GER)	European Track Champion U23 (keirin); 2007	Succeeded by Miriam Welte (GER)
Preceded by Ellen van Dijk (NED) & Elizabeth Armitstead (GBR)	European Track Champion U23 (scratch race); 2009	Succeeded by Renata Dąbrowska
