= Cycling at the 2006 Commonwealth Games – Women's 500 m time trial =

The 500 metres women's time trial at the 2006 Commonwealth Games was contested at the Melbourne Multi Purpose Venue on March 16, 2006.

Anna Meares of Australia won the gold medal.

== Results ==
Rank	Race Number	Name	250 m Time	500 m Time
1st place, gold medalist(s)	17	Anna Meares (AUS)	19.355	34.326
2nd place, silver medalist(s)	58	Victoria Pendleton (ENG)	19.576	34.662
3rd place, bronze medalist(s)	18	Kerrie Meares (AUS)	19.750	35.210
4	116	Fiona Carswell (NZL)	20.222	35.635
5	121	Elisabeth Williams (NZL)	20.451	36.104
