= Victoria Pendleton =

British cyclist

Victoria Pendleton CBE OLY
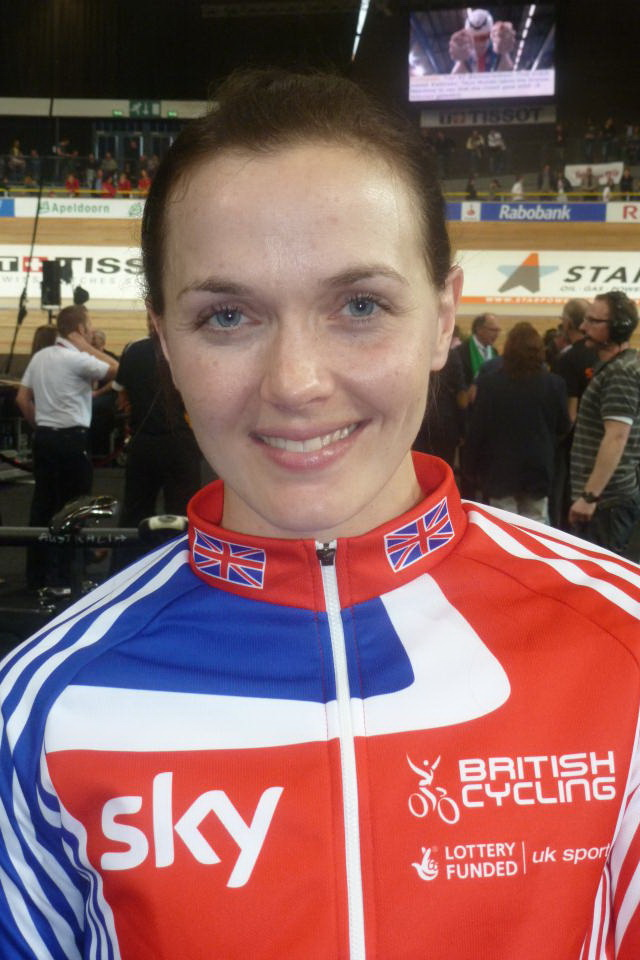
- Pendleton in 2011

Personal information
- Full name: Victoria Louise Pendleton
- Nickname: Queen Vic
- Born: 24 September 1980 (age 46) Stotfold, Bedfordshire, England
- Height: 1.65 m (5 ft 5 in)
- Weight: 60 kg (130 lb; 9.4 st)

Cycling career
- Sport: Cycling
- Current team: Retired
- Discipline: Track
- Role: Rider
- Rider type: Sprinter

Amateur teams
- Mildenhall Cycling Club
- VC St Raphael

Professional teams
- 2006–2007: Science in Sport / Trek
- 2008–2012: Sky Track Cycling
Medal record
Women's track cycling
Representing Great Britain
Olympic Games
Gold medal – first place	2008 Beijing	Sprint
Gold medal – first place	2012 London	Keirin
Silver medal – second place	2012 London	Sprint
World Championships
Gold medal – first place	2005 Los Angeles	Sprint
Gold medal – first place	2007 Palma de Mallorca	Team sprint
Gold medal – first place	2007 Palma de Mallorca	Sprint
Gold medal – first place	2007 Palma de Mallorca	Keirin
Gold medal – first place	2008 Manchester	Team sprint
Gold medal – first place	2008 Manchester	Sprint
Gold medal – first place	2009 Pruszków	Sprint
Gold medal – first place	2010 Ballerup	Sprint
Gold medal – first place	2012 Melbourne	Sprint
Silver medal – second place	2006 Bordeaux	Sprint
Silver medal – second place	2008 Manchester	Keirin
Silver medal – second place	2009 Pruszków	Team sprint
Silver medal – second place	2010 Ballerup	Keirin
Silver medal – second place	2011 Apeldoorn	Team sprint
Bronze medal – third place	2009 Pruszków	500 m time trial
Bronze medal – third place	2011 Apeldoorn	Sprint
European Championships
Gold medal – first place	2011 Apeldoorn	Team sprint
Gold medal – first place	2011 Apeldoorn	Keirin
Silver medal – second place	2010 Pruszków	Team sprint
Representing England
Commonwealth Games
Gold medal – first place	2006 Melbourne	Sprint
Silver medal – second place	2006 Melbourne	500 m time trial

Victoria Louise Pendleton (born 24 September 1980) is a British former track cyclist who specialised in the sprint, team sprint and keirin disciplines. She is a former Olympic, World, European and Commonwealth champion. She won three Olympic medals—two golds and one silver—during her career.

Pendleton won nine world titles, including a record-equalling six in the individual sprint between 2005 and 2012. She also won world titles in the team sprint, in 2007 and 2008, and the keirin, in 2007. At the 2008 Summer Olympics, she won the gold medal in the sprint, and in the 2012 Summer Olympics, she won the gold medal in the keirin and a silver medal in the sprint. She also became a Commonwealth Games champion in the sprint in 2006 and a European champion in the team sprint and keirin in 2011. She retired from track cycling after the 2012 Olympics and had a short career as a jockey from 2015‍–‍16. Riding Pacha Du Polder, she won her first race at Wincanton in March 2016 and finished fifth in the Foxhunter Chase at the Cheltenham Festival later that month.

Pendleton was appointed Member of the Order of the British Empire (MBE) in the 2009 New Year Honours and Commander of the Order of the British Empire (CBE) in the 2013 New Year Honours. She is a member of the British Cycling Hall of Fame.

== Early life ==
Victoria Pendleton was born on 24 September 1980 and grew up with her twin brother and older sister in Stotfold, Bedfordshire. Her father, Max, was a keen amateur cyclist and former British National 8 km grass track cycling champion. He would take the nine-year-old twins out racing at the weekends and create children's races for them to compete in. She was a member of Mildenhall Cycling Club. Pendleton attended Fearnhill School and played hockey for Harpenden. She later said that the "traits that make an Olympic champion do not make for a popular teenage girl" at school, and that she felt like a social outcast, which she described as "painful".

At the age of nine, Pendleton rode her first race, a 400 m event, on the grass track at Fordham, Cambridgeshire. When she was 16, assistant national track coach, Marshall Thomas, invited her to a trial in Manchester, where she cycled in a velodrome for the first time. Thomas then assumed coaching responsibilities from her father. At that time, Pendleton did not envisage a career in cycling due to a lack of female role-models in the sport. She took a degree in sports science at Northumbria University, Newcastle upon Tyne, and in her final year at university, she trained with British Cycling one week per month. After graduating in 2002, she became a full-time cyclist.

== Cycling career ==
=== 2001–2008 ===
Pendleton finished second in the 500 m time trial, 30 km points race and the sprint as well as recording a third-place finish in the scratch race at the 2001 British National Track Championships. From 2002–2004, she trained at the World Cycling Centre in Switzerland, under the tutelage of Frédéric Magné. Pendleton found the experience challenging, her wellbeing suffered, and she self-harmed. She began deviating from her training programme, which upset Magné. Commenting on this period, Pendleton explained: "I had always feared letting down figures of authority, my dad most of all, and so I felt diminished by disappointing Fred." British Cycling sent psychiatrist Steve Peters to meet her. They began working together, with positive results. Pendleton later stated: "If it wasn't for Steve [Peters], I don't think I'd be cycling today."

Pendleton competed at the 2002 Commonwealth Games, where she finished fourth in the sprint. In 2003, she recorded another fourth-place finish in the sprint at the 2003 UCI Track Cycling World Championships. In the 2003 World Cup, she won the scratch race in Sydney, and the following year, she secured victory in the sprint at the 2004 World Cup event in Manchester. She then finished fourth in the sprint at the 2004 UCI Track Cycling World Championships. At the 2004 Summer Olympics, she finished sixth in the 500 m time trial and ninth in the sprint. Pendleton later said that she was not ready both physically and psychologically for the Olympics at that time, and considered quitting the sport. At the end of the year, she won the keirin at the 2004–05 World Cup meeting in Los Angeles.

In January, Pendleton competed in a subsequent meeting of the World Cup in Manchester, where she claimed second place in the 500 m time trial. She then won her first world title after finishing first in the sprint at the 2005 UCI Track Cycling World Championships in Los Angeles. She overcame Anna Meares in the semi-finals before defeating Tamilla Abassova in the final. She became the first British woman to be a track cycling world champion since Beryl Burton in 1966. At the 2005–06 World Cup event in Manchester, Pendleton won the sprint and finished third in both the keirin and 500 m time trial.

At the 2006 Commonwealth Games in Melbourne, she won a silver medal in the 500 m time trial (behind Anna Meares). She then defeated Meares in the final of the sprint to secure the gold medal. The following month, at the 2006 UCI Track Cycling World Championships in Bordeaux, Pendleton was unable to defend her world sprint title. She finished runner-up after she was beaten by Natalia Tsylinskaya in the final. In the keirin, an incident with rival Anna Meares caused Meares to be relegated and left Pendleton unable to challenge for a medal. Meares apologised afterwards, but the incident started a long-term rivalry between the pair. Pendleton won three gold medals at the Manchester leg of the 2006–07 Track Cycling World Cup, securing victories in the sprint, keirin and 500 m time trial.

At the 2007 UCI Track Cycling World Championships, she won the team sprint alongside Shanaze Reade, the sprint (overcoming Guo Shuang in the final), and the keirin. In December, she won gold in the keirin at the 2007–08 World Cup event in Sydney. At the end of 2007, she was named Sunday Times Sportswoman of the Year and the Sports Journalists' Association's Sportswoman of the Year.

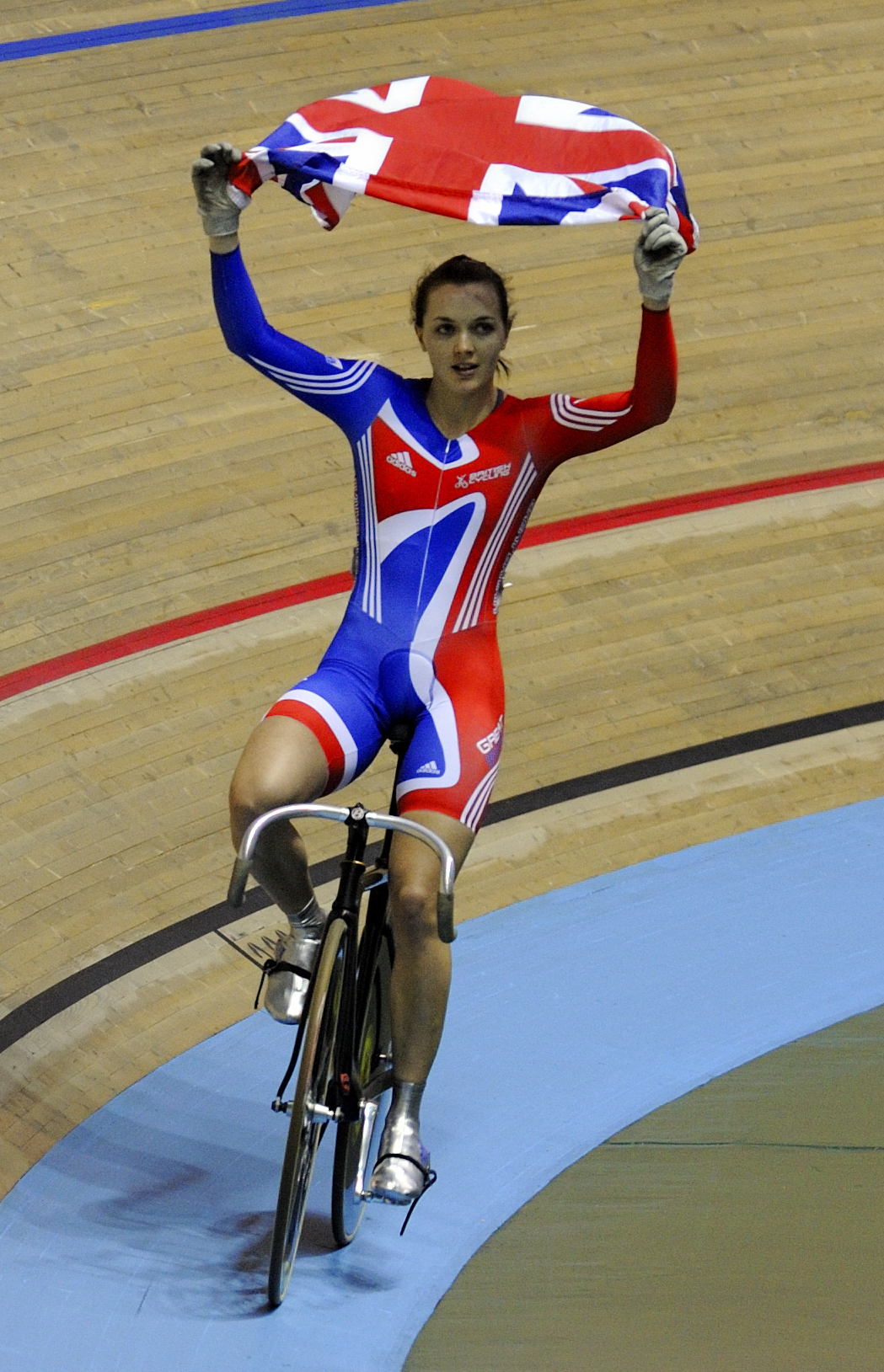
Pendleton celebrates winning the sprint at the 2008 UCI Track Cycling World Championships

Coming back from illness and a knee injury, Pendleton finished second in the sprint at the 2007–08 World Cup meeting in Copenhagen. During her build-up to the Olympics, she won two world titles at the 2008 UCI Track Cycling World Championships in the sprint (overcoming Simona Krupeckaite in the final) and the team sprint (with Reade). She was also second in the keirin. At the 2008 Summer Olympics, Pendleton won the gold medal in the sprint, defeating Anna Meares in the final. Her success made her the first British female cyclist to win a gold medal in the sprint at an Olympic Games. Pendleton was critical of the Olympics, pointing out that only three medal events in track cycling were available for women, whereas there were seven medal events in the men's Olympic schedule. Only one of the women's races was in a discipline that Pendleton competed in, and she said she felt "sick" by the decision.

In October 2008, Pendleton joined the Sky+HD Trade Team. In the 2008–09 World Cup, she won three gold medals at the meeting in Manchester, triumphing in the keirin, sprint and 500 m time trial.

=== 2009–2012 ===
She retained her world title in the sprint at the 2009 UCI Track Cycling World Championships in Pruszków, with a photo-finish victory over Willy Kanis. In addition to her world sprint title, Pendleton also finished second in the team sprint (with Reade) and third in the 500 m time trial. In the 2009–10 World Cup event in Manchester, Pendleton finished first in the sprint and second in the 500 m time trial.

At the 2010 UCI Track Cycling World Championships in Copenhagen, Pendleton again retained her world sprint title. She defeated Anna Meares in the semi-finals before overcoming Guo in the final to achieve victory in the event for the fourth year in succession. She also finished runner-up in the kierin. Later that year, she won her ninth consecutive British sprint title at the National Championships. She also won the 500 m time trial for the eighth time, her 25th national track title overall. Pendleton chose not to participate at the 2010 Commonwealth Games in order to focus on the upcoming European Championships. There, she won a silver medal in the team sprint with Jessica Varnish. In the 2010–11 World Cup, Pendleton won silver medals in the sprint and team sprint in Melbourne, before securing gold medals in the team sprint and keirin in Cali.

At the 2011 UCI Track Cycling World Championships, Pendleton came second in the team sprint (with Varnish), third in the sprint (losing to Anna Meares in the semi-finals), and finished seventh in the keirin. Her third-place position in the sprint meant that she failed to become world sprint champion for the first time since 2006, and she later said that this had affected her confidence and led to self-doubt. She stated: "The worst thing you can do is start doubting what you do. As soon as you start doubting your training programme and over-analysing it, you just start spiralling down." Partnering Varnish, Pendleton won the team sprint in the National Championships. At the 2011 European Track Championships, Pendleton won the team sprint and keirin titles, and finished eighth in the sprint.

In February 2012, Pendleton and Varnish set a new team sprint world record of 32.754 seconds while defeating the Australian pairing of Kaarle McCulloch and Anna Meares at the Track World Cup race in London. In Pendleton's final World Championships, she won the women's world sprint title for a record-equalling sixth time. She progressed past Anna Meares in their semi-final on a photo finish before defeating Simona Krupeckaitė 2–0, with the second win coming from a relegation to her opponent. Pendleton finished without medals in her other two events, the keirin and the team sprint.

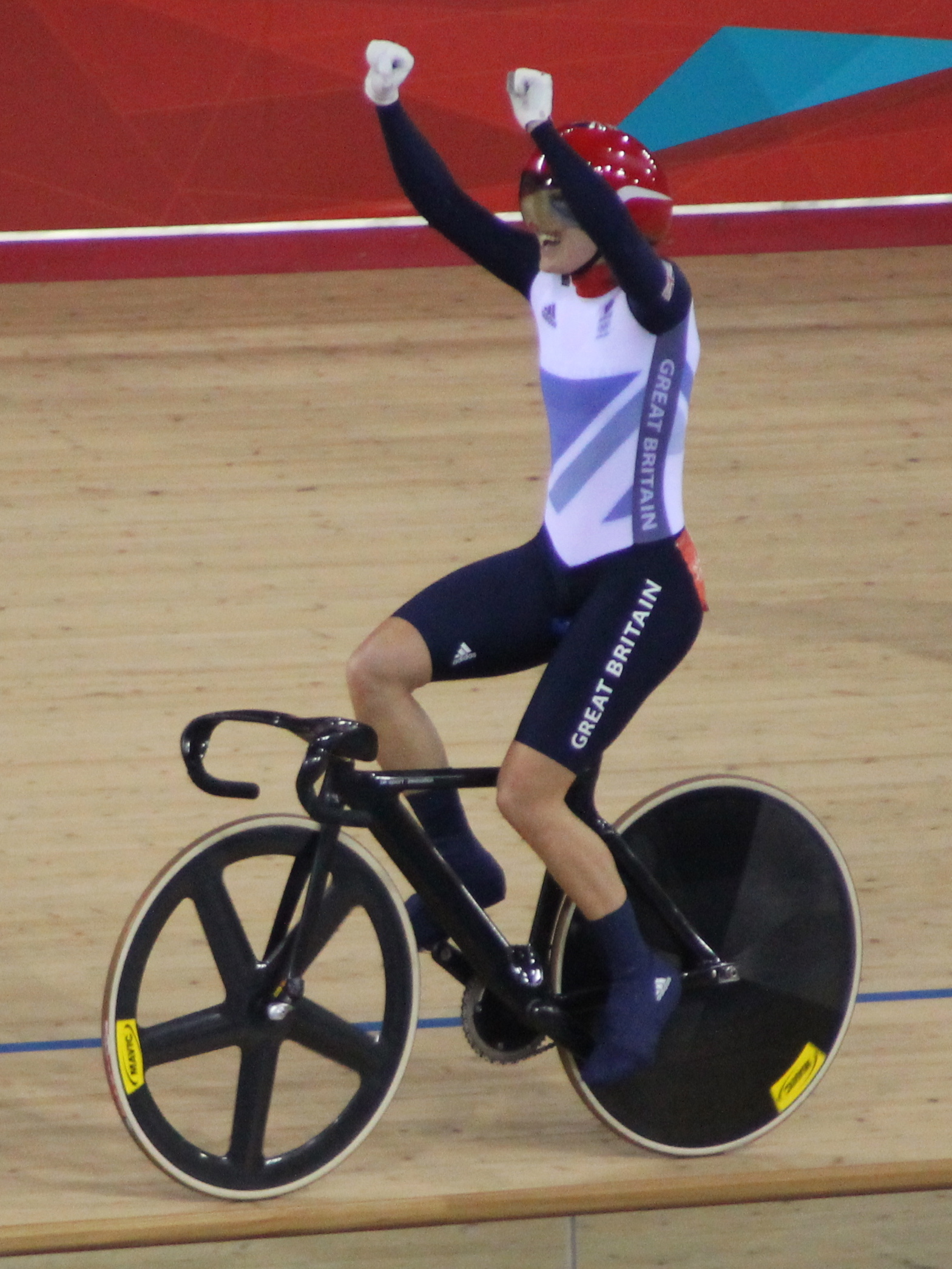
Pendleton celebrates winning the keirin at the 2012 Summer Olympics in London.

At the 2012 Summer Olympics, Pendleton and Varnish broke the world record in the qualifying stages of the team sprint before being disqualified in the semi-finals due to an illegal change-over. Their world record was then beaten by China later in the event. She recovered to win a gold medal in the keirin, becoming the first British woman to win an individual gold medal at successive Olympic Games. Pendleton set a new Olympic record of 10.724 seconds in the qualifiers of the sprint, but lost in the final to Anna Meares. Pendleton was relegated in the first run and beaten in the second run, finishing with the silver medal. This was Pendleton's final competitive race before she retired from professional cycling.

=== Later developments ===
In 2016, Pendleton, reflecting on the end of her cycling career, said that she had not enjoyed the atmosphere at British Cycling, stating: "I couldn't stay working with those people", adding: "If, four years ago, they'd made the changes that they’ve made now, (Note: In 2016, British Cycling commissioned a Cycling Independent Review to address concerns over the culture at the organisation, as well as athlete development. They then began addressing the issues that were identified.) I would've been a lot happier." She also stated that her professional relationship with coach Shane Sutton had deteriorated between the 2008 and 2012 Olympic Games. In 2016, British Cycling carried out an in-house inquiry following allegations against Sutton by Pendleton's teammate Varnish. Sutton was cleared of all but one charge (using sexist language), but in 2017, British Cycling conceded that the organisation's achievements had "come at too high a price."

=== Horse racing and other sports ===
In March 2015, Pendleton, searching for a new challenge, announced that she was training to become a jockey with guidance from horse trainer Paul Nicholls. She stated that she had only ridden a horse for the first time a week previously, but it was her ambition to compete in the Foxhunter Chase at the 2016 Cheltenham Festival. In August 2015, she earned her amateur riders' licence from the British Horseracing Authority and made her competitive debut later that month, riding Royal Etiquette to a second-placed finish in the Betfair Novice Flat Amateur Riders' Handicap at Ripon. On 19 February 2016, Pendleton was unseated whilst riding Pachu du Polder at Fakenham. She then secured her maiden victory on 2 March 2016, guiding the same horse to success at Wincanton.

On 18 March 2016, Pendleton, riding Pacha Du Polder, realized her aim of competing in the 2016 Foxhunter Chase at Cheltenham, finishing fifth. She described the result as "probably the greatest achievement of my life." In July 2017, at the invitation of English Heritage, she spent a bootcamp day at Kenilworth Castle to learn the basic trainings of the medieval sport of jousting.

== In the media ==
Pendleton featured on the cover of men's magazine FHM in 2009. In 2012, Harper's Bazaar magazine named her as joint recipient of British Ambassador of the Year in their Women of the Year Awards. In February 2012, Halfords released a Pendleton branded range of women's bikes on which Pendleton herself had worked as a design consultant. In the build up to the 2012 Summer Olympics, she was a brand ambassador for Oral-B and Pantene.

Pendleton was the subject of a BBC television documentary titled Victoria Pendleton: Cycling's Golden Girl which aired in July 2012. Later that year, she was a contestant on series 10 of Strictly Come Dancing, in which her professional partner was Brendan Cole. She was the seventh of the fourteen celebrities to leave the show. Pendleton released an autobiography titled Between the Lines in September 2012. At the 2014 Conservative Party Conference, Pendleton introduced the Secretary of State for Education Nicky Morgan before Morgan's keynote speech on 30 September; Pendleton spoke about the importance of sport in education. In 2016, Pendleton partnered with Clinique, with the aim to inspire women and support the provision of educational and healthcare support.

In May 2018, Pendleton was forced to abandon a charity Everest ascent that she was completing with TV presenter Ben Fogle. At Base Camp 2 (6400 m of altitude), she experienced hypoxia which was caused by a shortage of oxygen. It took her three weeks of antibiotics to get over chest and ear infections. In 2019, Pendleton stated that she had suffered severe depression and had contemplated suicide after her failed Everest expedition. She stated that surfing had helped her recovery, and she subsequently became a patron of the Wave Project charity which utilises the sport as a therapy.

In 2019, Pendleton competed on Celebrity SAS: Who Dares Wins for Stand Up to Cancer (SU2C). In November 2020, Pendleton was accused by crew mate Craig Charles of creating a "toxic" atmosphere during the filming of the TV show Don't Rock the Boat. In 2021, she co-commentated on the cycling as part of the BBC's Summer Olympics coverage. Pendleton has also appeared in the TV show The Dog House in which she adopted a rescued Rhodesian Ridgeback. In 2026, she authored a psychology book called The Fear Opportunity.

== Personal life ==
Pendleton was made a Member of the Order of the British Empire (MBE) in the 2009 New Year Honours for services to sport, and she was made a Commander of the Order of the British Empire (CBE) in the 2013 New Year Honours for services to cycling. In 2014, she was inducted into the British Cycling Hall of Fame.

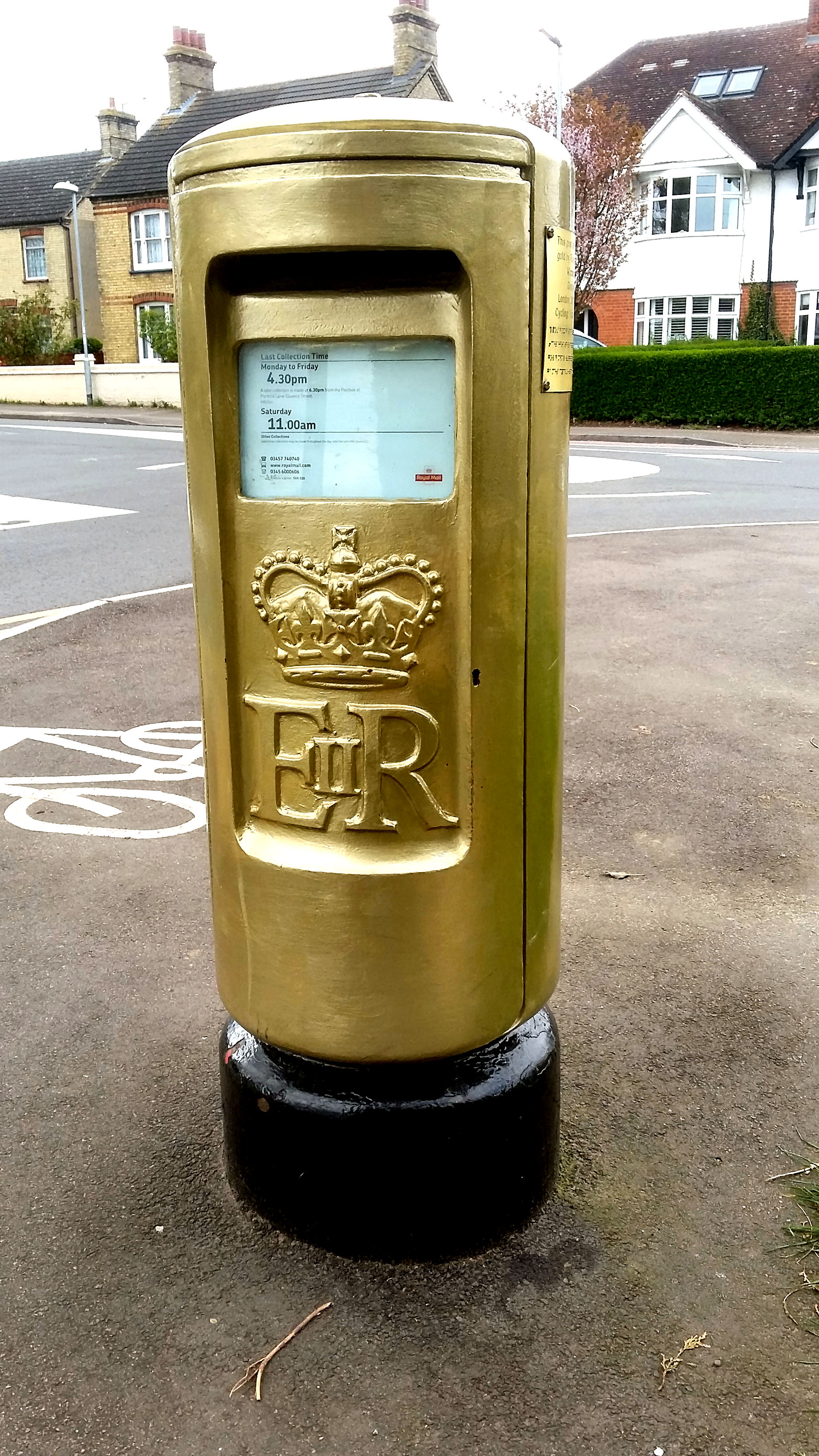
The gold postbox in honour of Pendleton in Stotfold

In 2012, The Royal Mail painted a postbox gold in Pendleton's hometown of Stotfold to honour her gold medal at the Olympic Games. In 2012, the Royal Mail also released a set of commemorative stamps from the 2012 Olympics, with Pendleton's win in the keirin featuring on one.

Pendleton's relationship with Scott Gardner, a sports scientist with British Cycling's coaching team, caused 'friction with teammates', as it was considered to be unprofessional for two members of the team to be romantically involved. Following the 2008 Olympics, when it became more widely known, Gardner left the team, though he was later re-hired after Pendleton suffered a loss of form. Some of Pendleton's teammates were unhappy to lose Gardner as a coach and blamed her for the situation. The couple married in September 2013. They initially hid their relationship from other members of the team, and when the news came out, Pendleton said: "They were so upset with me – disgusted, like I'd committed a crime," adding: "But the relationship didn’t make me any less of an athlete or any less professional or any less successful." Pendleton also said the reaction by her teammates had left her "distraught". In July 2018, she announced that they were separating.

She is in a relationship with Louis Tinsley, an ex-special forces member whom she met while filming Celebrity SAS: Who Dares Wins in 2019. In June 2023, she announced that her brother had died from a brain tumour. In July 2024, Pendleton was made Honorary Colonel and corps ambassador to HM Royal Marines. She has a tattoo of the song lyric 'Today is the greatest day I've ever known' from The Smashing Pumpkins' song "Today" on her arm.

== Palmarès ==
2002
National Track Championships

1st Sprint
1st 500 m time trial

2003
National Track Championships

1st Sprint
1st 500 m time trial
1st Keirin
1st Scratch race

2003 Track Cycling World Cup

1st Scratch, Sydney

2004
National Track Championships

1st Sprint
1st 500 m time trial

2004 Track Cycling World Cup

1st Sprint, Manchester
3rd 500 m time trial, Manchester

2004-05 Track Cycling World Cup

1st Keirin, Los Angeles
2nd Sprint, Manchester
2nd 500 m time trial, Manchester

2005
1st Sprint, World Track Championships
National Track Championships

1st Sprint
1st 500 m time trial
1st Keirin
1st Scratch Race

2005-06 Track Cycling World Cup

2nd Sprint, Moscow
1st Sprint, Manchester
3rd Keirin, Manchester
3rd 500 m time trial, Manchester

2006
Commonwealth Games

1st Sprint
2nd Time trial

2nd Sprint, World Track Championships
National Track Championships

1st Sprint
1st 500 m time trial
1st Keirin
1st Scratch race

1st National Derny Championship
2006-07 Track Cycling World Cup

2nd Sprint, Sydney
1st Keirin, Moscow
1st Sprint, Manchester
1st 500 m time trial, Manchester
1st Keirin, Manchester

2007
World Track Championships

1st Sprint
1st Team sprint (with Shanaze Reade)
1st Keirin

National Track Championships

1st Sprint
1st 500 m time trial
1st Keirin

1st National Derny Championship
2007-08 Track Cycling World Cup

1st Keirin, Sydney
2nd Sprint, Beijing
2nd Sprint, Copenhagen

2008
1st Sprint, Olympic Games
World Track Championships

1st Sprint
1st Team sprint (with Shanaze Reade)
2nd Keirin

National Track Championships

1st Sprint
1st Team sprint (with Anna Blyth)
1st Keirin

2008-09 Track Cycling World Cup

1st Sprint, Manchester
1st Keirin, Manchester
1st 500 m time trial, Manchester
1st Sprint, Copenhagen

2009
World Track Championships

1st Sprint
2nd Team sprint (with Shanaze Reade)
3rd 500 m time trial

National Track Championships

1st 500 m time trial
1st Kierin
1st Sprint

2009-10 Track Cycling World Cup

1st Sprint, Manchester
2nd 500 m time trial, Manchester

2010
World Track Championships

1st Sprint
2nd Keirin

2010-11 Track Cycling World Cup

2nd Team sprint (with Jessica Varnish), Melbourne
2nd Sprint, Melbourne
1st Team sprint (with Jessica Varnish), Cali
1st Keirin, Cali
2nd Sprint, Cali
3rd Sprint, Manchester
3rd Keirin, Manchester

National Championships

1st Sprint
1st 500 m time trial

2011
1st Team sprint (with Jessica Varnish), European Track Championships
World Track Championships

2nd Team sprint (with Jessica Varnish)
3rd Sprint

2011-12 Track Cycling World Cup

1st Team sprint (with Jessica Varnish), London

National Track Championships

1st Team sprint (with Jessica Varnish)

2012
Olympic Games

1st Keirin
2nd Sprint

1st Sprint, World Track Championships

== See also ==
- List of multiple Olympic gold medalists
- List of Olympic medalists in cycling (women)
- 2012 Olympics gold post boxes in the United Kingdom
- List of British cyclists
- Cycle Republic

== Bibliography ==
- Pendleton, Victoria (2012). Between the Lines: The Autobiography. London: HarperCollins. ISBN 978-0-00-732752-2.
