= 2008 UCI Track Cycling World Championships =

Cycling world championships

- Venue: Manchester, United Kingdom
- Date: 26–30 March 2008
- Velodrome: Manchester Velodrome
- Events: 18

The 2008 UCI Track Cycling World Championships were the World Championship for track cycling. They took place at the Manchester Velodrome in Manchester, United Kingdom from 26 to 30 March 2008. Eighteen events were scheduled: the women's team pursuit being the only addition from the 2007 championships.

As in 2007, the domination of the Great Britain team was clear. Breaking three world records en route, they won eleven medals in total. Indeed, half of the eighteen gold medals on offer were won by the British team.

== Medal table ==
Rank	Nation	Gold	Silver	Bronze	Total
1	Great Britain (GBR)	9	2	0	11
2	Netherlands (NED)	3	3	2	8
3	Belarus (BLR)	2	0	1	3
4	France (FRA)	1	3	3	7
5	United States (USA)	1	1	1	3
6	Cuba (CUB)	1	1	0	2
7	New Zealand (NZL)	1	0	0	1
8	Denmark (DEN)	0	2	1	3
9	Lithuania (LTU)	0	2	0	2
10	Germany (GER)	0	1	4	5
11	Australia (AUS)	0	1	3	4
12	China (CHN)	0	1	0	1
12	Ukraine (UKR)	0	1	0	1
14	Greece (GRE)	0	0	1	1
14	Italy (ITA)	0	0	1	1
14	Russia (RUS)	0	0	1	1
Totals (16 entries)		18	18	18	54

== Medal summary ==
Event	Gold		Silver		Bronze	
Men's Events
Men's sprint	Chris Hoy; Great Britain		Kévin Sireau; France		Mickaël Bourgain; France	
Men's 1 km time trial	Teun Mulder; Netherlands	1:01.332	Michaël D'Almeida; France	1:01.514	François Pervis; France	1:01.574
Men's individual pursuit	Bradley Wiggins; Great Britain	4:18.519	Jenning Huizenga; Netherlands	4:23.474	Alexei Markov; Russia	4:21.097
Men's team pursuit	Ed Clancy; Geraint Thomas; Paul Manning; Bradley Wiggins; Great Britain	3:56.322; WR	Michael Færk Christensen; Casper Jørgensen; Jens-Erik Madsen; Alex Rasmussen; Denmark	3:59.381	Graeme Brown; Mark Jamieson; Bradley McGee; Luke Roberts; Jack Bobridge; Australia	4:00.089
Men's team sprint	Grégory Baugé; Kévin Sireau; Arnaud Tournant; France	43.271	Ross Edgar; Chris Hoy; Jamie Staff; Great Britain	43.777	Theo Bos; Teun Mulder; Tim Veldt; Netherlands	43.718
Men's keirin	Chris Hoy; Great Britain		Teun Mulder; Netherlands		Christos Volikakis; Greece	
Men's scratch	Aliaksandr Lisouski; Belarus		Wim Stroetinga; Netherlands		Roger Kluge; Germany	
Men's points race	Vasil Kiryienka; Belarus	24	Christophe Riblon; France	23	Peter Schep; Netherlands	19
Men's madison	Mark Cavendish; Bradley Wiggins; Great Britain	19	Roger Kluge; Olaf Pollack; Germany	13	Michael Mørkøv; Alex Rasmussen; Denmark	11
Men's omnium	Hayden Godfrey; New Zealand	19	Leigh Howard; Australia	28	Aliaksandr Lisouski; Belarus	35
Women's Events
Women's sprint	Victoria Pendleton; Great Britain		Simona Krupeckaitė; Lithuania		Jennie Reed; United States	
Women's 500 m time trial	Lisandra Guerra; Cuba	34.021	Simona Krupeckaitė; Lithuania	34.066	Sandie Clair; France	34.253
Women's individual pursuit	Rebecca Romero; Great Britain	3:30.501	Sarah Hammer; United States	3:37.006	Katie Mactier; Australia	3:32.347
Women's team pursuit	Wendy Houvenaghel; Rebecca Romero; Joanna Rowsell; Great Britain	3:22.415; WR	Svitlana Halyuk; Lesya Kalytovska; Lyubov Shulika; Ukraine	3:29.744	Charlotte Becker; Verena Joos; Alexandra Sontheimer; Germany	3:26.960
Women's team sprint	Victoria Pendleton; Shanaze Reade; Great Britain	33.661	Gong Jinjie; Zheng Lulu; China	34.223	Dana Glöss; Miriam Welte; Germany	34.036
Women's keirin	Jennie Reed; United States		Victoria Pendleton; Great Britain		Christin Muche; Germany	
Women's scratch	Ellen van Dijk; Netherlands		Yumari Gonzalez Valdivieso; Cuba		Belinda Goss; Australia	
Women's points race	Marianne Vos; Netherlands	33	Trine Schmidt; Denmark	25	Vera Carrara; Italy	20

== See also ==
- 2008–09 UCI Track Cycling World Ranking
- 2008 in track cycling
