= 2009 UCI Track Cycling World Championships =

Cycling world championships

- Venue: Pruszków, Poland
- Date: 25–29 March 2009
- Velodrome: BGŻ Arena
- Events: 19

The 2009 UCI Track Cycling World Championships are the World Championship for track cycling. They took place at the BGŻ Arena in Pruszków, Poland from 25 to 29 March 2009. Nineteen events were on the programme, with the women's omnium being added to the eighteen events contested at the 2008 championships.

Australia topped the medal table with four gold medals, with France on second and Great Britain on third place.

In the Men's events, Michael Mørkøv and Alex Rasmussen, both of Denmark, and Grégory Baugé of France took home two gold medals while Australian Cameron Meyer took home a gold and two silver medals. For the women, Simona Krupeckaitė of Lithuania won three medals; a gold and two bronzes. Victoria Pendleton and Elizabeth Armitstead of Great Britain won three medals each; a gold, a silver, and a bronze with.

== Medal table ==
Rank	Nation	Gold	Silver	Bronze	Total
1	Australia (AUS)	4	4	2	10
2	France (FRA)	3	2	1	6
3	Great Britain (GBR)	2	4	3	9
4	Denmark (DEN)	2	1	0	3
5	Germany (GER)	2	0	1	3
6	New Zealand (NZL)	1	1	1	3
7	Cuba (CUB)	1	1	0	2
7	United States (USA)	1	1	0	2
9	Lithuania (LTU)	1	0	3	4
10	China (CHN)	1	0	0	1
10	Italy (ITA)	1	0	0	1
12	Canada (CAN)	0	2	0	2
13	Netherlands (NED)	0	1	4	5
14	Malaysia (MAS)	0	1	1	2
15	Argentina (ARG)	0	1	0	1
16	Austria (AUT)	0	0	1	1
16	Belgium (BEL)	0	0	1	1
16	Czech Republic (CZE)	0	0	1	1
Totals (18 entries)		19	19	19	57

== Medal summary ==
Event	Gold		Silver		Bronze	
Men's events
Men's sprint	Grégory Baugé; France		Azizul Hasni Awang; Malaysia		Kévin Sireau; France	
Men's 1 km time trial	Stefan Nimke; Germany	1:00.666	Taylor Phinney; United States	1:01.611	Mohd Rizal Tisin; Malaysia	1:01.658
Men's individual pursuit	Taylor Phinney; United States	4:17.631	Jack Bobridge; Australia	4:20.091	Dominique Cornu; Belgium	4:22.347
Men's team pursuit	Michael Færk Christensen; Casper Jørgensen; Jens-Erik Madsen; Alex Rasmussen; Michael Mørkøv (qualifying round only); Denmark	3:58.246	Jack Bobridge; Rohan Dennis; Leigh Howard; Cameron Meyer; Australia	3:58.863	Westley Gough; Peter Latham; Marc Ryan; Jesse Sergent; New Zealand	4:00.248
Men's team sprint	Grégory Baugé; Mickaël Bourgain; Kévin Sireau; France	43.510	Matthew Crampton; Jason Kenny; Jamie Staff; Great Britain	43.869	René Enders; Robert Förstemann; Stefan Nimke; Germany	43.912
Men's keirin	Maximilian Levy; Germany		François Pervis; France		Teun Mulder; Netherlands	
Men's scratch	Morgan Kneisky; France		Ángel Colla; Argentina		Andreas Müller; Austria	
Men's points race	Cameron Meyer; Australia	24	Daniel Kreutzfeldt; Denmark	22	Chris Newton; Great Britain	21
Men's madison	Michael Mørkøv; Alex Rasmussen; Denmark		Leigh Howard; Cameron Meyer; Australia		Martin Bláha; Jiří Hochmann; Czech Republic	
Men's omnium	Leigh Howard; Australia	19	Zachary Bell; Canada	21	Tim Veldt; Netherlands	24
Women's events
Women's sprint	Victoria Pendleton; Great Britain		Willy Kanis; Netherlands		Simona Krupeckaitė; Lithuania	
Women's 500 m time trial	Simona Krupeckaitė; Lithuania	33.296; WR	Anna Meares; Australia	33.796	Victoria Pendleton; Great Britain	34.102
Women's individual pursuit	Alison Shanks; New Zealand	3:29.807	Wendy Houvenaghel; Great Britain	3:32.174	Vilija Sereikaitė; Lithuania	3:33.583
Women's team pursuit	Elizabeth Armitstead; Wendy Houvenaghel; Joanna Rowsell; Great Britain	3:22.720	Lauren Ellis; Jaime Nielsen; Alison Shanks; New Zealand	3:23.993	Ashlee Ankudinoff; Sarah Kent; Josephine Tomic; Australia	3:24.972
Women's team sprint	Kaarle McCulloch; Anna Meares; Australia	33.149; WR	Shanaze Reade; Victoria Pendleton; Great Britain	33.380	Gintarė Gaivenytė; Simona Krupeckaitė; Lithuania	33.495
Women's keirin	Guo Shuang; China		Clara Sanchez; France		Willy Kanis; Netherlands	
Women's scratch	Yumari González; Cuba		Elizabeth Armitstead; Great Britain		Belinda Goss; Australia	
Women's points race	Giorgia Bronzini; Italy	18	Yumari González; Cuba	15	Elizabeth Armitstead; Great Britain	13
Women's omnium	Josephine Tomic; Australia	26	Tara Whitten; Canada	27	Yvonne Hijgenaar; Netherlands	27

== See also ==
- Cycling at the 2008 Summer Olympics
- 2008–09 UCI Track Cycling World Ranking
- 2008–09 UCI Track Cycling World Cup Classics
