= 2007 UCI Track Cycling World Championships =

Cycling world championships

- Venue: Palma de Mallorca, Spain
- Date: March 29–April 1, 2007
- Velodrome: Palma Arena
- Events: 17

The 2007 UCI Track Cycling World Championships is the World Championship for track cycling. It took place in Palma de Mallorca, Spain from March 29, 2007, to April 1, 2007. The event was dominated by the Great Britain team who topped the medals table, winning seven of the seventeen gold medals on offer.

The 2007 programme comprised 17 events, including the 10 Olympic events, and was also the first time that the multi-disciplinary Omnium – a cycling equivalent to the athletics pentathlon consisting of 5 events – was contested.

== Medal table ==
Rank	Nation	Gold	Silver	Bronze	Total
1	Great Britain (GBR)	7	2	2	11
2	Australia (AUS)	2	0	4	6
3	Netherlands (NED)	1	4	1	6
4	France (FRA)	1	2	1	4
5	Cuba (CUB)	1	1	0	2
6	Czech Republic (CZE)	1	0	1	2
6	Spain (ESP)	1	0	1	2
6	United States (USA)	1	0	1	2
9	Hong Kong (HKG)	1	0	0	1
9	Switzerland (SUI)	1	0	0	1
11	China (CHN)	0	2	0	2
12	Denmark (DEN)	0	1	1	2
12	Germany (GER)	0	1	1	2
14	Argentina (ARG)	0	1	0	1
14	Belgium (BEL)	0	1	0	1
14	Colombia (COL)	0	1	0	1
14	Ukraine (UKR)	0	1	0	1
18	Belarus (BLR)	0	0	1	1
18	New Zealand (NZL)	0	0	1	1
18	Poland (POL)	0	0	1	1
18	Russia (RUS)	0	0	1	1
Totals (21 entries)		17	17	17	51

== Medal summary ==
Event	Gold	Silver	Bronze
Men's Events
Sprint	Theo Bos; Netherlands	Grégory Baugé; France	Mickaël Bourgain; France
1 km time trial	Chris Hoy; Great Britain	François Pervis; France	Jamie Staff; Great Britain
Individual pursuit	Bradley Wiggins; Great Britain	Robert Bartko; Germany	Sergi Escobar; Spain
Team pursuit	Great Britain (GBR); Edward Clancy; Geraint Thomas; Paul Manning; Bradley Wiggins	Ukraine (UKR); Lyubomyr Polatayko; Maxim Polischuk; Vitaliy Popkov; Vitaliy Shchedov	Denmark (DEN); Casper Jørgensen; Jens-Erik Madsen; Michael Mørkøv; Alex Rasmussen
Team sprint	France (FRA); Grégory Baugé; Mickaël Bourgain; Arnaud Tournant	Great Britain (GBR); Ross Edgar; Chris Hoy; Craig MacLean	Germany (GER); Robert Förstemann; Maximilian Levy; Stefan Nimke
Keirin	Chris Hoy; Great Britain	Theo Bos; Netherlands	Ross Edgar; Great Britain
Scratch	Wong Kam Po; Hong Kong	Wim Stroetinga; Netherlands	Rafał Ratajczyk; Poland
Points race	Joan Llaneras; Spain	Iljo Keisse; Belgium	Mikhail Ignatiev; Russia
Madison	Switzerland (SUI); Franco Marvulli; Bruno Risi	Netherlands (NED); Peter Schep; Danny Stam	Czech Republic (CZE); Alois Kaňkovský; Petr Lazar
Omnium	Alois Kaňkovský; Czech Republic	Walter Pérez; Argentina	Brad Huff; United States
Women's Events
Sprint	Victoria Pendleton; Great Britain	Guo Shuang; China	Anna Meares; Australia
500 m time trial	Anna Meares; Australia	Lisandra Guerra; Cuba	Natallia Tsylinskaya; Belarus
Individual pursuit	Sarah Hammer; United States	Rebecca Romero; Great Britain	Katie Mactier; Australia
Team sprint	Great Britain (GBR); Victoria Pendleton; Shanaze Reade	Netherlands (NED); Yvonne Hijgenaar; Willy Kanis	Australia (AUS); Kristine Bayley; Anna Meares
Keirin	Victoria Pendleton; Great Britain	Guo Shuang; China	Anna Meares; Australia
Scratch	Yumari González; Cuba	María Luisa Calle; Colombia	Adrie Visser; Netherlands
Points race	Katherine Bates; Australia	Mie Lacota; Denmark	Catherine Cheatley; New Zealand

== See also ==
- 2007 in track cycling
