= Renata Dąbrowska =

Polish cyclist

Personal information
- Born: 8 February 1989 (age 37) Poland

Cycling career
- Sport: Cycling
- Role: Rider (track)

Renata Dąbrowska (born 8 February 1989) is a Polish track racing cyclist.

She competed at the 2009 UCI Track Cycling World Championships in four disciplines and at the 2010 UCI Track Cycling World Championships in five disciplines. She won at the 2010 European Track Championships (under-23) the scratch.

== Career results ==
2008
2nd Team Sprint, UEC European U23 Track Championships (with Marta Janowiak)
2009
UEC European U23 Track Championships

2nd Keirin
3rd Team Sprint (with Marta Janowiak)

2010
UEC European U23 Track Championships

1st Scratch Race
2nd Team Pursuit (with Katarzyna Pawłowska and Małgorzata Wojtyra)
