= Guo Shuang =

Chinese cyclist (born 1986)

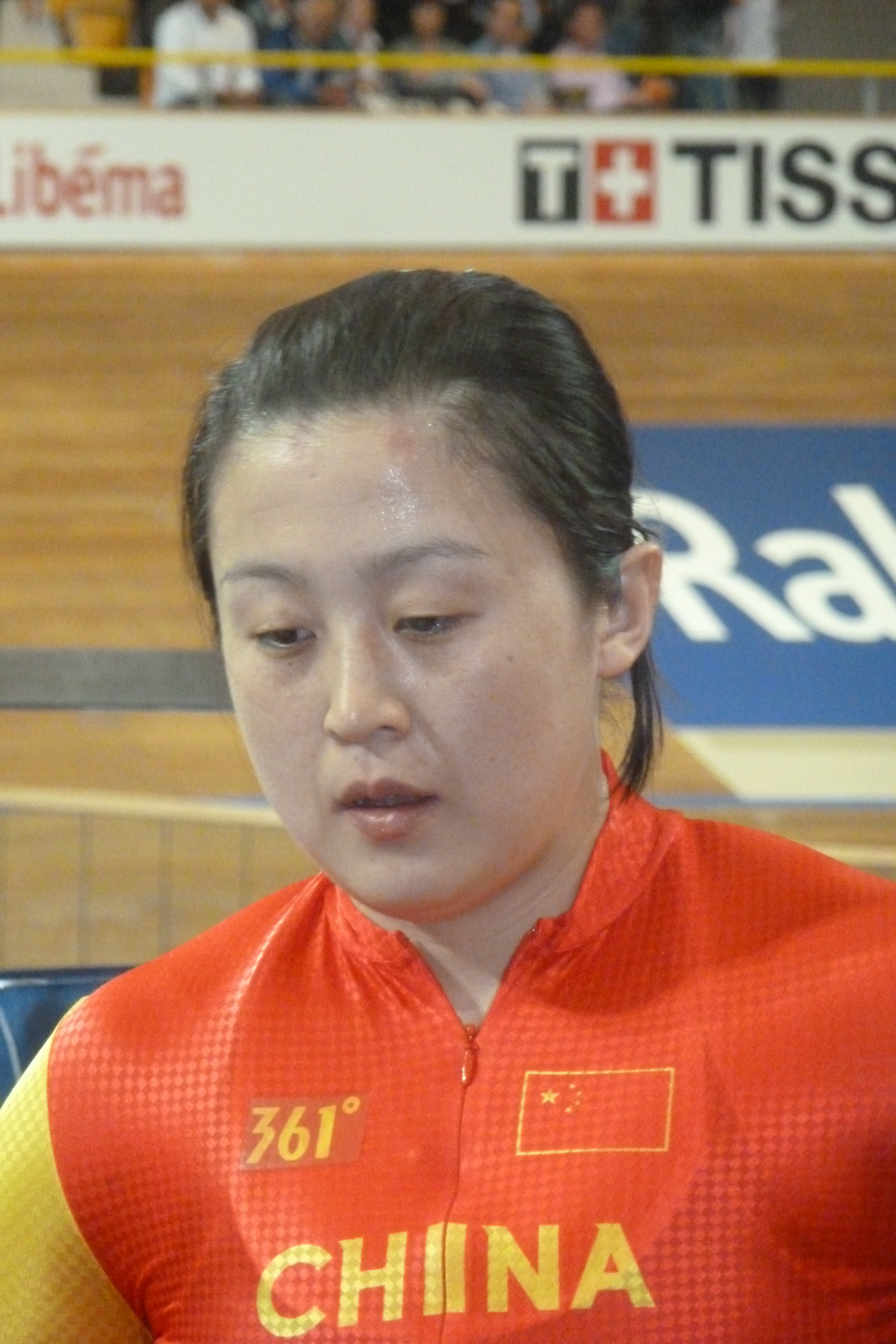

Personal information
- Full name: Guo Shuang
- Born: February 26, 1986 (age 40) Tongliao, Inner Mongolia, China
- Height: 1.70 m (5 ft 7 in)
- Weight: 70 kg (154 lb)

Cycling career
- Sport: Cycling
- Discipline: Track
- Role: Rider
- Rider type: Sprint

Major wins
- World keirin champion (2009)
Medal record
Women's track cycling
Representing China
Olympic Games
Silver medal – second place	2012 London	Team sprint
Silver medal – second place	2012 London	Keirin
Bronze medal – third place	2008 Beijing	Sprint
Bronze medal – third place	2012 London	Sprint
World Championships
Gold medal – first place	2009 Pruszków	Keirin
Silver medal – second place	2007 Palma de Mallorca	Sprint
Silver medal – second place	2007 Palma de Mallorca	Keirin
Silver medal – second place	2010 Ballerup	Sprint
Silver medal – second place	2013 Minsk	Team sprint
Bronze medal – third place	2006 Bordeaux	Sprint
Bronze medal – third place	2006 Bordeaux	Keirin
Bronze medal – third place	2011 Apeldoorn	Team sprint
Bronze medal – third place	2012 Melbourne	Team sprint
Asian Games
Gold medal – first place	2010 Guangzhou	Sprint
Silver medal – second place	2010 Guangzhou	500 m time trial
Universiade
Gold medal – first place	2011 Shenzhen	Sprint

Guo Shuang (郭爽, born February 26, 1986) is a Chinese professional track cyclist. She won two bronze medals at the 2006 UCI Track Cycling World Championships, in Sprint and Keirin, and two silver medals at the 2007 UCI Track Cycling World Championships, again in Sprint and Keirin.

Guo had an eventful semi-final in the sprint at the 2008 Summer Olympics, having won the first heat and conceded the second to her opponent Anna Meares, the third heat saw Guo come down the banking too steeply and her front wheel slipped from beneath her. The heat was re-run and although Guo won by a few millimetres, she was relegated for coming down the tack and pushing Meares onto the côte d'azure on the final lap. This put Meares through to the final ride-off for gold. Guo went on to win the final ride-off for the bronze against Willy Kanis.

Guo competed in the 2012 Summer Olympics in London. She and Gong Jinjie set a world record of 32.447 seconds in the qualification round of the team sprint event, which they then improved upon with 32.422 in the next round. They went on to finish first in the final against the German team, but were disqualified for an early relay, and were relegated to the silver medal instead. Guo and Gong's coach Daniel Morelon maintains that the pair were "robbed" of the gold medal, and described it as an "injustice". He complained that the judges refused to provide a "video footage of the race on slow motion", and only provided a "vague explanation" for the infringement they had allegedly committed. However, the British cycling champions Victoria Pendleton and Jessica Varnish, who were also disqualified for a similar reason earlier on in the competition, accepted the judges decision and chose not to claim that they were unfairly robbed of a medal. Pendleton recovered and went on to win a gold medal in the women's keirin event with Guo Shuang coming 2nd.

== Palmarès ==
2004
2004 World Cup

1st Keirin, Moscow
1st Keirin, Sydney

2005
2004–2005 World Cup

2nd Sprint, Sydney
2nd Keirin, Sydney

2005–2006 World Cup

3rd Sprint, Manchester

2006
World Championships, Bordeaux

3rd Sprint
3rd Keirin

2005–2006 World Cup

3rd Sprint, Los Angeles
2nd 500 m, Los Angeles
2nd Keirin, Los Angeles

2006–2007 World Cup

1st Keirin, Sydney

Asian Games

1st 500 m
1st Sprint

2007
World Championships, Palma de Mallorca

2nd Sprint
2nd Keirin

2006–2007 World Cup

3rd 500 m, Los Angeles
1st Keirin, Los Angeles
2nd Sprint, Manchester
3rd Keirin, Manchester

2007–2008 World Cup

3rd Team Sprint, Beijing

2008
1st Sprint, Fenioux France Trophy
2007–2008 World Cup

3rd Sprint, Copenhagen

3rd Sprint, 2008 Summer Olympics

2009
World Championships, Pruszków

1st Keirin

2008–2009 World Cup

2nd Keirin, Round 4, Beijing
3rd Keirin, Round 5, Beijing
3rd Team sprint, Round 5, Beijing

2009–2010 UCI Track Cycling World Cup Classics

2nd Keirin, Round 1, Manchester
2nd Sprint, Round 1, Manchester
2nd Keirin, Round 2, Melbourne
2nd Sprint, Round 2, Melbourne

2012
Olympic Games, London

2nd Team sprint (with Gong Jinjie)
3rd Individual Sprint
2nd Keirin

2014
Grand Prix de Vitesse de Saint-Denis

1st Keirin
1st Sprint

GP von Deutschland im Sprint

2nd Keirin
2nd Sprint

Incheon International Track Competition

2nd Keirin
2nd Sprint

Cottbuser SprintCup

3rd Keirin
3rd Sprint

2015
China Track Cup

1st Sprint
2nd Keirin
3rd Keirin

Melbourne Cup on Wheels

2nd Keirin
2nd Sprint

2nd Keirin, Super Drome Cup
South Australian Grand Prix

3rd Keirin
3rd Sprint

2017
National Track Championships

1st Keirin
3rd Team Sprint (with Zhong Tianshi)
