= Elisa Frisoni =

Italian bicycle racer (born 1985)

Personal information
- Born: 8 August 1985 (age 41)

Cycling career
- Sport: Cycling
- Discipline: Track cycling
- Role: Rider
- Rider type: sprinter

Professional team
- 2007: Saccarelli Emu Sea Marsciano

Elisa Frisoni (born 8 August 1985) is an Italian female track cyclist, and part of the national team. She competed at the 2004, 2005, 2006, 2008, 2009 and 2010 UCI Track Cycling World Championships. She won the silver medal in the keirin event at the 2004 UCI Track Cycling World Championships and 2005 UCI Track Cycling World Championships.
