= Zheng Lulu =

Chinese track cyclist

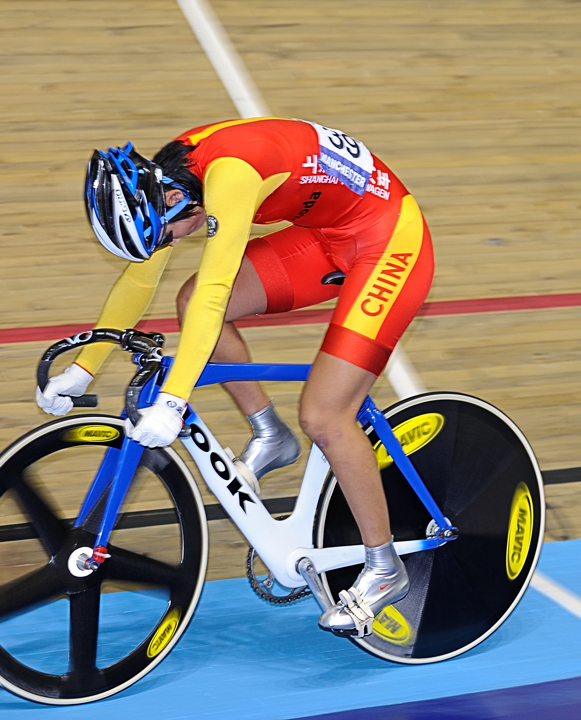
- Lulu Zheng at UCI Track World Cup 2008 in Manchester

Personal information
- Born: 24 January 1987 (age 39)

Cycling career
- Sport: Cycling
- Discipline: Track cycling
- Role: Rider
- Rider type: sprinter

Professional teams
- 2006–2007: Giant Pro Cycling (Track Team)
- 2009: Giant Pro Cycling (Track Team)

Zheng Lulu (born 24 January 1987) is a Chinese female track cyclist, and part of the national team. She competed at the 2008 and 2009 UCI Track Cycling World Championships and won the silver medal in the team sprint event in 2008.
