= Gong Jinjie =

Chinese cyclist

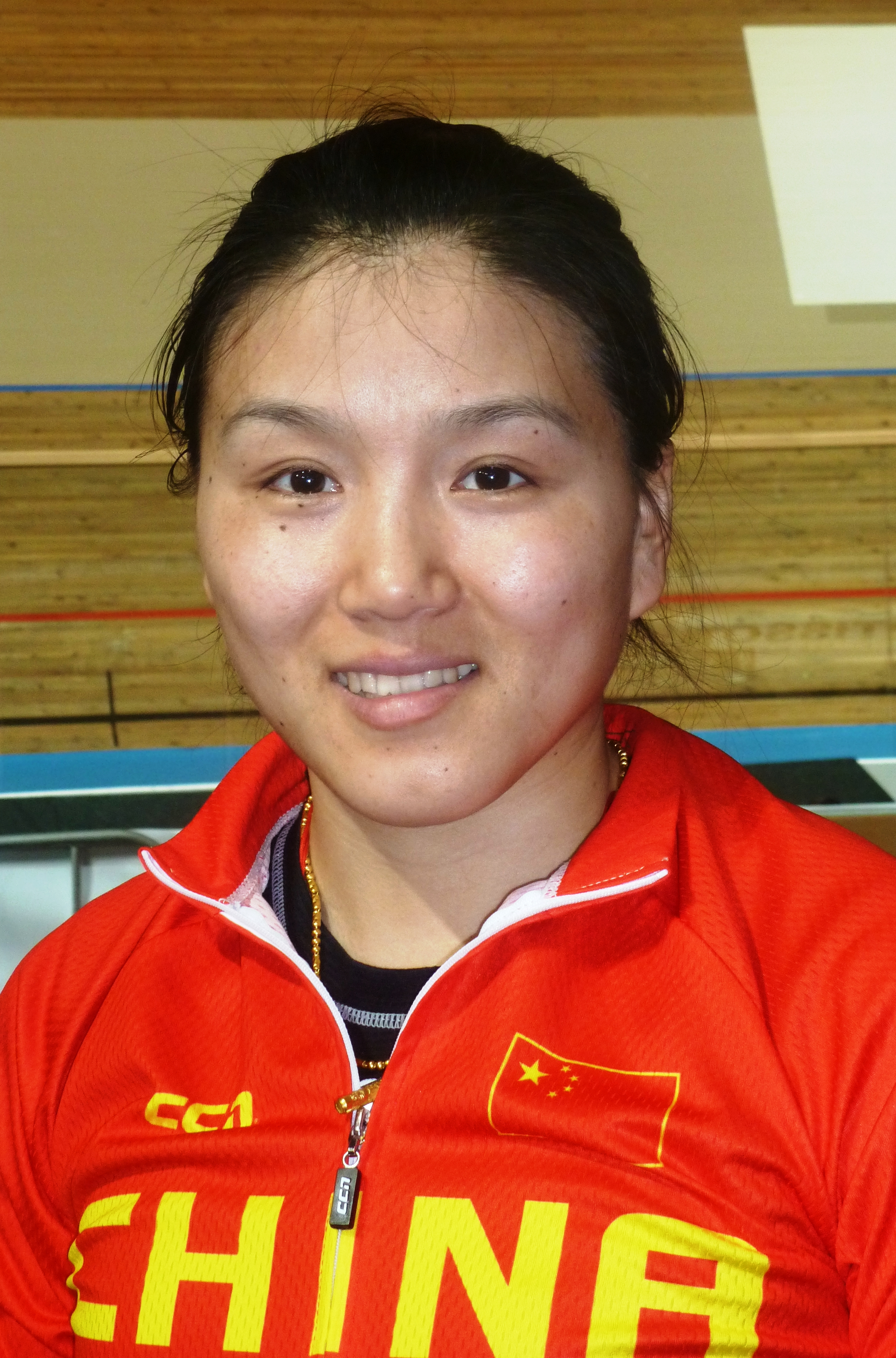

Personal information
- Born: 12 November 1986 (age 39)

Cycling career
- Sport: Cycling
- Discipline: Track
- Role: Rider
- Rider type: Sprint
Medal record
Olympic Games
Gold medal – first place	2016 Rio de Janeiro	Team sprint
Silver medal – second place	2012 London	Team sprint
World Championships
Gold medal – first place	2015 Yvelines	Team sprint
Silver medal – second place	2008 Manchester	Team sprint
Silver medal – second place	2010 Ballerup	Team sprint
Silver medal – second place	2013 Minsk	Team sprint
Silver medal – second place	2013 Minsk	Keirin
Silver medal – second place	2016 London	Team sprint
Bronze medal – third place	2011 Apeldoorn	Team sprint
Bronze medal – third place	2012 Melbourne	Team sprint
Asian Games
Silver medal – second place	2006 Doha	Sprint
Summer Universiade
Gold medal – first place	2011 Shenzhen	500 m time trial

Gong Jinjie (Chinese: 宫金杰; pinyin: Gōng Jīnjié, born 12 November 1986) is a Chinese professional track cyclist, a member of the provincial Jilin Team since 2002 and the Chinese National Team since 2005. Her coaches include Yongqing Wang (王永庆) and Sean Eadie.

== Career ==
Gong competed in the 2012 Summer Olympics in London. She and Guo Shuang set a world record of 32.447 seconds in the qualification round of the team sprint event, which they then improved upon with 32.422 in the next round. They went on to finish first in the final against the German team, but were disqualified for an alleged "early relay", and were relegated to the silver medal instead. Gong and Guo's coach Daniel Morelon maintains that the pair were "robbed" of the gold medal, and described it as an "injustice". He complained that the judges refused to provide a "video footage of the race on slow motion", and only provided a "vague explanation" for the infringement they had allegedly committed.

Gong competed in the 2016 Summer Olympics in Rio de Janeiro. She and Zhong Tianshi set a world record of 31.928 seconds in the qualification round of the team sprint event, and won China's first ever Olympics Cycling gold medal in the final by beating the Russian team.

== Career highlights ==
Date	Placing	Event	Competition	Location	Country
13 December 2006	2nd place, silver medalist(s)	Sprint	Asian Games	Doha	Qatar
20 January 2008	3	Keirin	World Cup	Los Angeles	United States
16 February 2008	1	500 m time trial	World Cup	Ballerup	Denmark
27 March 2008	2nd place, silver medalist(s)	Team sprint (Note: The other rider on the team was Zheng Lulu)	World Championships	Manchester	United Kingdom
1 November 2008	2	500 m time trial	World Cup	Manchester	United Kingdom
2 November 2008	3	Keirin	World Cup	Manchester	United Kingdom
22 November 2008	2	500 m time trial	World Cup	Melbourne	Australia
17 January 2009	2	500 m time trial	World Cup	Beijing	China
17 January 2009	3	Team sprint	World Cup	Beijing	China
20 November 2009	1	Team sprint (Note: The other rider on the team was Lin Junhong)	World Cup	Melbourne	Australia
23 January 2010	2	500 m time trial	World Cup	Beijing	China
23 January 2010	1	Team sprint	World Cup	Beijing	China
25 March 2010	2nd place, silver medalist(s)	Team sprint	World Championships	Ballerup	Denmark
2 December 2010	1	Team sprint (Note: The other rider on the team was Guo Shuang)	World Cup	Melbourne	Australia
21 January 2011	1	Team sprint	World Cup	Beijing	China
18 February 2011	2	Team sprint	World Cup	Manchester	United Kingdom
24 March 2011	3rd place, bronze medalist(s)	Team sprint	World Championships	Apeldoorn	Netherlands
2 August 2012	2nd place, silver medalist(s)	Team sprint	Olympic Games	London	United Kingdom

2014
1st Team Sprint, Asian Games (with Zhong Tianshi)
2015
GP von Deutschland im Sprint

1st Team Sprint (with Zhong Tianshi)
3rd Sprint

2016
1st Team Sprint, Asian Track Championships (with Zhong Tianshi)
