= Clara Sanchez (cyclist) =

French cyclist

Clara Henriette (née Sanchez)
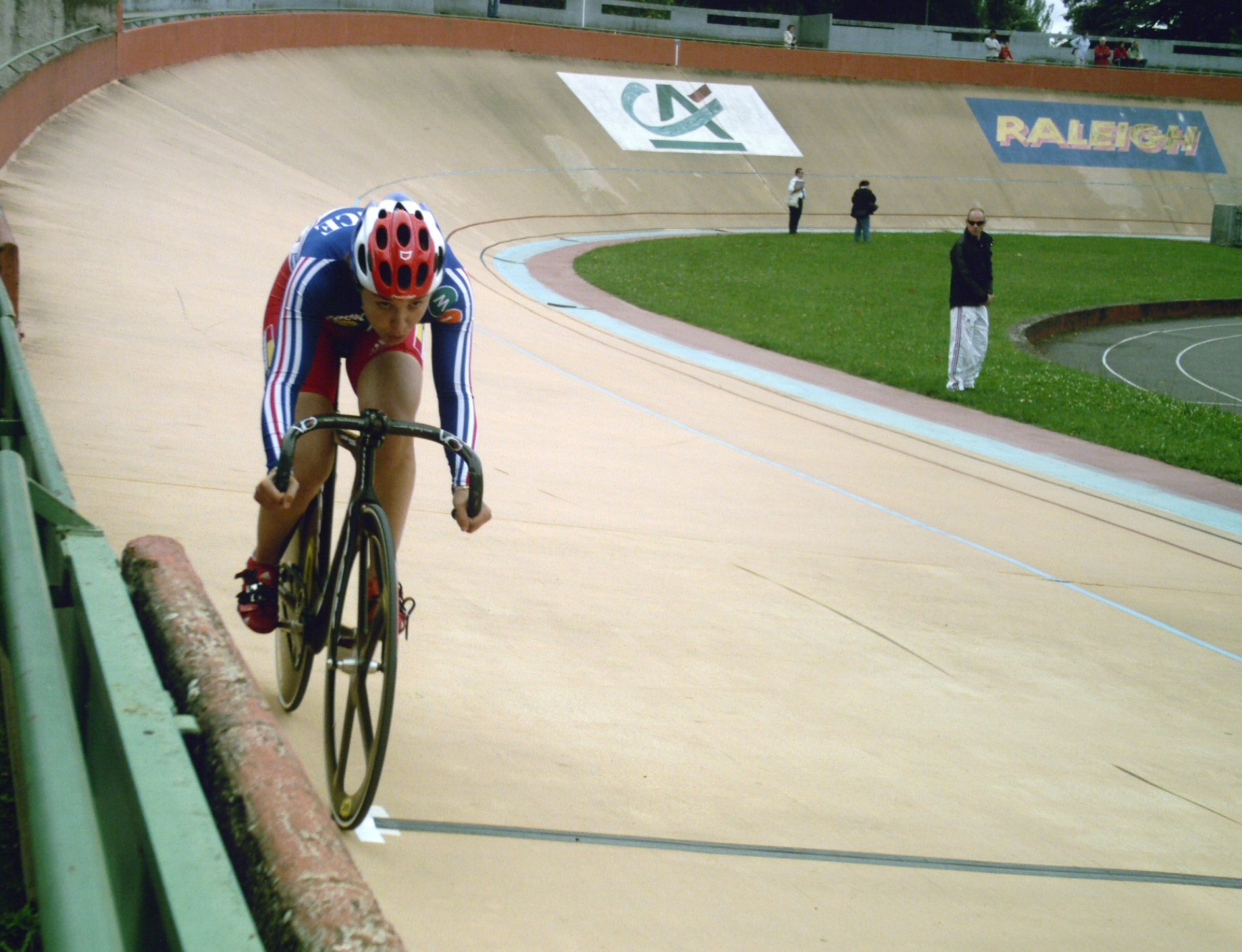

Personal information
- Full name: Clara Henriette (née Sanchez)
- Born: 20 September 1983 (age 43) Martigues, France

Cycling career
- Sport: Cycling
- Discipline: Track
- Role: Coach
- Rider type: Sprint

Major wins
- Keirin world champion (2004, 2005)
Medal record
Women's track cycling
Representing France
World Championships
Gold medal – first place	2004 Melbourne	Keirin
Gold medal – first place	2005 Los Angeles	Keirin
Silver medal – second place	2002 Copenhagen	Keirin
Silver medal – second place	2006 Bordeaux	Keirin
Bronze medal – third place	2011 Apeldoorn	Keirin
European Elite Championships
Gold medal – first place	2010 Pruszków	Team Sprint
Silver medal – second place	2011 Apeldoorn	Keirin

Clara Henriette (née Sanchez; born 20 September 1983 in Martigues) is a French professional track cyclist and is now the coach of the French national sprint squad. She won the Keirin World Championship on two occasions, 2004 and 2005.

She competed for France at the 2008 Summer Olympics and the 2012 Summer Olympics.

== Palmarès ==
2002
National Track Championships

2nd, 500 m

World Championships, Copenhagen

2nd, Keirin

2003
National Track Championships

1st, 500 m

2004
National Track Championships

1st, 500 m

World Championships, Melbourne

1st, Keirin

2004 World Cup

2nd, Team Sprint, Moscow
2nd, Team Sprint, Manchester
3rd, 500 m, Sydney

2005
World Championships, Los Angeles

1st, Keirin

2005–2006 World Cup

1st, Keirin, Manchester

2006
National Track Championships

1st, 500 m

2005–2006 World Cup

2nd, Sprint, Los Angeles
1st, Keirin, Los Angeles

World Championships, Bordeaux

2nd, Keirin

2006–2007 World Cup

3rd, Sprint, Sydney
3rd, Team Sprint, Sydney

2007
2006–2007 World Cup

2nd, Sprint, Los Angeles

3rd, 500 m, Aigle
1st, Keirin, Aigle
2007–2008 World Cup

3rd, Sprint Beijing
2nd, Team Sprint, Beijing

2008
1st Sprint, Grand Prix de Vitesse de Saint Denis
2nd Sprint, Fenioux France Trophy
2007–2008 World Cup

3rd, Team Sprint, Copenhagen

2013
1st Keirin, Revolution – Round 2, Glasgow
