= 2005 UCI Track Cycling World Championships – Women's sprint =

Women's sprint at the 2005 UCI Track Cycling World Championships
- Venue: ADT Event Center
- Location: Los Angeles, United States
- Dates: March 25–26, 2005
- Competitors: 21 from 12 nations

Medalists
gold medal	Victoria Pendleton	Great Britain
silver medal	Tamilla Abassova	Russia
bronze medal	Anna Meares	Australia

The Women's sprint competition at the 2005 UCI Track Cycling World Championships was held over two days at ADT Event Center in Los Angeles, United States. 21 riders from 12 nations competed. The early rounds were raced on March 25, with the semifinals and finals held on March 26.

Victoria Pendleton won her first world title in this event, the first British woman to do so in any track cycling event since Beryl Burton in 1966.

The final for bronze saw Australian sisters Kerrie Meares and Anna Meares competing for the medal, with Anna eventually claiming victory. The Meares sisters had raced each other for gold in the Australian National Track Championships a month earlier, and Anna had also won on that occasion.

== Results ==
=== Qualifying ===
Qualifying took place on Friday March 25, 2005, starting at 10:00. The qualifying round was a flying 200m time trial. The top 16 riders who completed qualifying would progress in the competition, with their qualifying positions used to seed the matches in the next round.

Qualifying results
Rank	Name	Nation	Time	Behind	Notes
1	Natallia Tsylinskaya	Belarus	11.278		Q
2	Yvonne Hijgenaar	Netherlands	11.386	+0.108	Q
3	Guo Shuang	China	11.494	+0.216	Q
4	Tamilla Abassova	Russia	11.532	+0.254	Q
5	Lori-Ann Muenzer	Canada	11.543	+0.265	Q
6	Willy Kanis	Netherlands	11.554	+0.276	Q
7	Clara Sanchez	France	11.617	+0.339	Q
8	Kerrie Meares	Australia	11.650	+0.372	Q
9	Elisa Frisoni	Italy	11.660	+0.382	Q
10	Anna Meares	Australia	11.686	+0.408	Q
11	Victoria Pendleton	Great Britain	11.725	+0.447	Q
12	Simona Krupeckaitė	Lithuania	11.752	+0.474	Q
13	Jennie Reed	United States	11.775	+0.497	Q
14	Fang Tian	China	11.796	+0.518	Q
15	Oksana Grishina	Russia	11.858	+0.580	Q
16	Céline Nivert	France	11.933	+0.655	Q
17	Susann Panzer	Germany	11.957	+0.679	
18	Rebecca Conzelman	United States	11.985	+0.707	
19	Ioulia Aroustamova	Russia	12.301	+1.023	
20	Alena Prudnikova	Russia	12.318	+1.040	
	Christin Muche	Germany			DNS

=== 1/8 Finals ===
The 1/8 finals took place on Friday March 25, 2005, starting at 11:55. Each heat consisted of a single three-lap race between two riders, with the winning rider proceeding to the next round.

1/8 Finals results
Heat	Rank	Name	Nation	Notes
1	1	Natallia Tsylinskaya	Belarus	Q
1	2	Céline Nivert	France	
2	1	Yvonne Hijgenaar	Netherlands	Q
2	2	Oksana Grishina	Russia	
3	1	Guo Shuang	China	Q
3	2	Fang Tian	China	
4	1	Tamilla Abassova	Russia	Q
4	2	Jennie Reed	United States	
5	1	Lori-Ann Muenzer	Canada	Q
5	2	Simona Krupeckaitė	Lithuania	
6	1	Victoria Pendleton	Great Britain	Q
6	2	Willy Kanis	Netherlands	
7	1	Anna Meares	Australia	Q
7	2	Clara Sanchez	France	
8	1	Kerrie Meares	Australia	Q
8	2	Elisa Frisoni	Italy	

=== Quarterfinals ===
The quarterfinals took place on Friday March 25, 2005, starting at 12:35. Each heat consisted of a single three-lap race, with the winner proceeding to the semifinals, and the losers racing again for 5th–8th place.

Natallia Tsylinskaya was relegated in the first heat for not holding her line during the last 200 metres of the race.

Quarterfinals results
Heat	Rank	Name	Nation	Notes
1	1	Kerrie Meares	Australia	Q
1	2	Natallia Tsylinskaya	Belarus	REL
2	1	Anna Meares	Australia	Q
2	2	Yvonne Hijgenaar	Netherlands	
3	1	Victoria Pendleton	Great Britain	Q
3	2	Guo Shuang	China	
4	1	Tamilla Abassova	Russia	Q
4	2	Lori-Ann Muenzer	Canada	

=== Race for 5th–8th Places ===
The race for 5th–8th place took place on Friday March 25, 2005, starting at 13:10. This round was a single three-lap race between all four competitors.

Race for 5th–8th Places results
Rank	Name	Nation	Notes
5	Natallia Tsylinskaya	Belarus	
6	Yvonne Hijgenaar	Netherlands	
7	Lori-Ann Muenzer	Canada	
8	Guo Shuang	China	

=== Semifinals ===
The semifinals took place on Saturday March 26, 2005, starting at 19:00. Each heat was a best-of-three competition between two riders, with riders needing to win two three-lap races to win their heat. The winners would race again for the gold and silver medals, and the losers would race again for the bronze medal and fourth place.

Semifinals results
Heat	Rank	Name	Nation	Race 1	Race 2	Decider	Notes
1	1	Tamilla Abassova	Russia	X	X		Q
1	2	Kerrie Meares	Australia				
2	1	Victoria Pendleton	Great Britain	X		X	Q
2	2	Anna Meares	Australia		X		

=== Finals ===
The finals took place on Saturday March 26, 2005, starting at 20:40. This round used the same best-of-three format as the semifinals.

Finals results
Rank	Name	Nation	Race 1	Race 2	Decider
Gold medal race
1st place, gold medalist(s)	Victoria Pendleton	Great Britain	X	X	
2nd place, silver medalist(s)	Tamilla Abassova	Russia			
Bronze medal race
3rd place, bronze medalist(s)	Anna Meares	Australia		X	X
4	Kerrie Meares	Australia	X		
