= List of Olympic medalists in cycling (women) =

This is the complete list of women's Olympic medalists in cycling.

== Current events ==
=== BMX ===
==== Freestyle ====
Games	Gold	Silver	Bronze
2020 Tokyo	Charlotte Worthington; Great Britain	Hannah Roberts; United States	Nikita Ducarroz; Switzerland
2024 Paris	Deng Yawen; China	Perris Benegas; United States	Natalya Diehm; Australia
2028 Los Angeles			

==== Racing ====
The BMX was introduced in 2008.

Games	Gold	Silver	Bronze
2008 Beijing	Anne-Caroline Chausson; France	Laëtitia Le Corguillé; France	Jill Kintner; United States
2012 London	Mariana Pajón; Colombia	Sarah Walker; New Zealand	Laura Smulders; Netherlands
2016 Rio de Janeiro	Mariana Pajón; Colombia	Alise Willoughby; United States	Stefany Hernández; Venezuela
2020 Tokyo	Beth Shriever; Great Britain	Mariana Pajón; Colombia	Merel Smulders; Netherlands
2024 Paris	Saya Sakakibara; Australia	Manon Veenstra; Netherlands	Zoé Claessens; Switzerland
2028 Los Angeles			

=== Mountain biking ===
==== Cross-country ====
The cross-country has been on the Olympic program from 1996 on.

Games	Gold	Silver	Bronze
1996 Atlanta	Paola Pezzo; Italy	Alison Sydor; Canada	Susan DeMattei; United States
2000 Sydney	Paola Pezzo; Italy	Barbara Blatter; Switzerland	Margarita Fullana; Spain
2004 Athens	Gunn-Rita Dahle; Norway	Marie-Hélène Prémont; Canada	Sabine Spitz; Germany
2008 Beijing	Sabine Spitz; Germany	Maja Włoszczowska; Poland	Irina Kalentieva; Russia
2012 London	Julie Bresset; France	Sabine Spitz; Germany	Georgia Gould; United States
2016 Rio de Janeiro	Jenny Rissveds; Sweden	Maja Włoszczowska; Poland	Catharine Pendrel; Canada
2020 Tokyo	Jolanda Neff; Switzerland	Sina Frei; Switzerland	Linda Indergand; Switzerland
2024 Paris	Pauline Ferrand-Prévot; France	Haley Batten; United States	Jenny Rissveds; Sweden
2028 Los Angeles			

=== Road cycling ===
==== Road race ====
The individual road race has been run every time since 1984.

Games	Gold	Silver	Bronze
1984 Los Angeles	Connie Carpenter; United States	Rebecca Twigg; United States	Sandra Schumacher; West Germany
1988 Seoul	Monique Knol; Netherlands	Jutta Niehaus; West Germany	Laima Zilporytė; Soviet Union
1992 Barcelona	Kathy Watt; Australia	Jeannie Longo-Ciprelli; France	Monique Knol; Netherlands
1996 Atlanta	Jeannie Longo-Ciprelli; France	Imelda Chiappa; Italy	Clara Hughes; Canada
2000 Sydney	Leontien Zijlaard; Netherlands	Hanka Kupfernagel; Germany	Diana Žiliūtė; Lithuania
2004 Athens	Sara Carrigan; Australia	Judith Arndt; Germany	Olga Slyusareva; Russia
2008 Beijing	Nicole Cooke; Great Britain	Emma Johansson; Sweden	Tatiana Guderzo; Italy
2012 London	Marianne Vos; Netherlands	Lizzie Armitstead; Great Britain	Olga Zabelinskaya; Russia
2016 Rio de Janeiro	Anna van der Breggen; Netherlands	Emma Johansson; Sweden	Elisa Longo Borghini; Italy
2020 Tokyo	Anna Kiesenhofer; Austria	Annemiek van Vleuten; Netherlands	Elisa Longo Borghini; Italy
2024 Paris	Kristen Faulkner; United States	Marianne Vos; Netherlands	Lotte Kopecky; Belgium
2028 Los Angeles			

==== Time trial ====
The individual time trial was introduced in 1996, and has been run ever since.

Games	Gold	Silver	Bronze
1996 Atlanta	Zulfiya Zabirova; Russia	Jeannie Longo-Ciprelli; France	Clara Hughes; Canada
2000 Sydney	Leontien Zijlaard; Netherlands	Mari Holden; United States	Jeannie Longo-Ciprelli; France
2004 Athens	Leontien van Moorsel; Netherlands	Dede Barry; United States	Karin Thürig; Switzerland
2008 Beijing	Kristin Armstrong; United States	Emma Pooley; Great Britain	Karin Thürig; Switzerland
2012 London	Kristin Armstrong; United States	Judith Arndt; Germany	Olga Zabelinskaya; Russia
2016 Rio de Janeiro	Kristin Armstrong; United States	Olga Zabelinskaya; Russia	Anna van der Breggen; Netherlands
2020 Tokyo	Annemiek van Vleuten; Netherlands	Marlen Reusser; Switzerland	Anna van der Breggen; Netherlands
2024 Paris	Grace Brown; Australia	Anna Henderson; Great Britain	Chloé Dygert; United States
2028 Los Angeles			

=== Track cycling ===
==== Keirin ====
Games	Gold	Silver	Bronze
2012 London	Victoria Pendleton; Great Britain	Guo Shuang; China	Lee Wai Sze; Hong Kong
2016 Rio de Janeiro	Elis Ligtlee; Netherlands	Becky James; Great Britain	Anna Meares; Australia
2020 Tokyo	Shanne Braspennincx; Netherlands	Ellesse Andrews; New Zealand	Lauriane Genest; Canada
2024 Paris	Ellesse Andrews; New Zealand	Hetty van de Wouw; Netherlands	Emma Finucane; Great Britain
2028 Los Angeles			

==== Madison ====
Games	Gold	Silver	Bronze
2020 Tokyo	Katie Archibald and Laura Kenny (GBR)	Amalie Dideriksen and Julie Leth (DEN)	Maria Novolodskaya and Gulnaz Khatuntseva (ROC)
2024 Paris	Chiara Consonni and Vittoria Guazzini (ITA)	Elinor Barker and Neah Evans (GBR)	Lisa van Belle and Maike van der Duin (NED)
2028 Los Angeles			

==== Omnium ====
Games	Gold	Silver	Bronze
2012 London	Laura Trott; Great Britain	Sarah Hammer; United States	Annette Edmondson; Australia
2016 Rio de Janeiro	Laura Trott; Great Britain	Sarah Hammer; United States	Jolien D'Hoore; Belgium
2020 Tokyo	Jennifer Valente; United States	Yumi Kajihara; Japan	Kirsten Wild; Netherlands
2024 Paris	Jennifer Valente; United States	Daria Pikulik; Poland	Ally Wollaston; New Zealand
2028 Los Angeles			

==== Pursuit, team ====
Games	Gold	Silver	Bronze
2012 London	Great Britain; Danielle King; Laura Trott; Joanna Rowsell	United States; Sarah Hammer; Dotsie Bausch; Jennie Reed; Lauren Tamayo	Canada; Tara Whitten; Gillian Carleton; Jasmin Glaesser
2016 Rio de Janeiro	Great Britain; Katie Archibald; Laura Trott; Elinor Barker; Joanna Rowsell Shand	United States; Sarah Hammer; Kelly Catlin; Chloé Dygert; Jennifer Valente	Canada; Allison Beveridge; Jasmin Glaesser; Kirsti Lay; Georgia Simmerling; Laura Brown
2020 Tokyo	Germany; Franziska Brauße; Lisa Brennauer; Lisa Klein; Mieke Kröger	Great Britain; Katie Archibald; Laura Kenny; Neah Evans; Josie Knight	United States; Chloé Dygert; Megan Jastrab; Jennifer Valente; Emma White
2024 Paris	United States; Jennifer Valente; Lily Williams; Chloé Dygert; Kristen Faulkner	New Zealand; Ally Wollaston; Bryony Botha; Emily Shearman; Nicole Shields	Great Britain; Elinor Barker; Josie Knight; Anna Morris; Jessica Roberts
2028 Los Angeles			

==== Sprint, individual ====
The individual sprint was first contested in the Olympics in 1988 and has been so ever since.

Games	Gold	Silver	Bronze
1988 Seoul	Erika Salumäe; Soviet Union	Christa Luding-Rothenburger; East Germany	Connie Young; United States
1992 Barcelona	Erika Salumäe; Estonia	Annett Neumann; Germany	Ingrid Haringa; Netherlands
1996 Atlanta	Félicia Ballanger; France	Michelle Ferris; Australia	Ingrid Haringa; Netherlands
2000 Sydney	Félicia Ballanger; France	Oksana Grishina; Russia	Iryna Yanovych; Ukraine
2004 Athens	Lori-Ann Muenzer; Canada	Tamilla Abassova; Russia	Anna Meares; Australia
2008 Beijing	Victoria Pendleton; Great Britain	Anna Meares; Australia	Guo Shuang; China
2012 London	Anna Meares; Australia	Victoria Pendleton; Great Britain	Guo Shuang; China
2016 Rio de Janeiro	Kristina Vogel; Germany	Becky James; Great Britain	Katy Marchant; Great Britain
2020 Tokyo	Kelsey Mitchell; Canada	Olena Starikova; Ukraine	Lee Wai-sze; Hong Kong
2024 Paris	Ellesse Andrews; New Zealand	Lea Friedrich; Germany	Emma Finucane; Great Britain
2028 Los Angeles			

==== Sprint, team ====
Games	Gold	Silver	Bronze
2012 London	Kristina Vogel and Miriam Welte (GER)	Gong Jinjie and Guo Shuang (CHN)	Kaarle McCulloch and Anna Meares (AUS)
2016 Rio de Janeiro	Gong Jinjie and Zhong Tianshi (CHN)	Daria Shmeleva and Anastasia Voynova (RUS)	Miriam Welte and Kristina Vogel (GER)
2020 Tokyo	Bao Shanju and Zhong Tianshi (CHN)	Lea Friedrich and Emma Hinze (GER)	Daria Shmeleva and Anastasia Voynova (ROC)
2024 Paris	Great Britain; Katy Marchant; Sophie Capewell; Emma Finucane	New Zealand; Rebecca Petch; Shaane Fulton; Ellesse Andrews	Germany; Pauline Grabosch; Emma Hinze; Lea Sophie Friedrich
2028 Los Angeles			

== Discontinued events ==
=== Track cycling ===
==== Points race ====
The points race was on the program from 1996 until 2008.

Games	Gold	Silver	Bronze
1996 Atlanta	Nathalie Lancien; France	Ingrid Haringa; Netherlands	Lucy Tyler-Sharman; Australia
2000 Sydney	Antonella Bellutti; Italy	Leontien Zijlaard; Netherlands	Olga Slyusareva; Russia
2004 Athens	Olga Slyusareva; Russia	Belem Guerrero; Mexico	María Luisa Calle; Colombia
2008 Beijing	Marianne Vos; Netherlands	Yoanka González; Cuba	Leire Olaberria; Spain

==== Pursuit, Individual ====
The individual pursuit over 3000 m was first done in 1992 until 2008.

Games	Gold	Silver	Bronze
1992 Barcelona	Petra Rossner; Germany	Kathy Watt; Australia	Rebecca Twigg; United States
1996 Atlanta	Antonella Bellutti; Italy	Marion Clignet; France	Judith Arndt; Germany
2000 Sydney	Leontien Zijlaard; Netherlands	Marion Clignet; France	Yvonne McGregor; Great Britain
2004 Athens	Sarah Ulmer; New Zealand	Katie Mactier; Australia	Leontien van Moorsel; Netherlands
2008 Beijing	Rebecca Romero; Great Britain	Wendy Houvenaghel; Great Britain	Lesya Kalytovska; Ukraine

==== Time trial ====
The 500 m time trial was only used in the 2000 and 2004 Olympics.

Games	Gold	Silver	Bronze
2000 Sydney	Félicia Ballanger; France	Michelle Ferris; Australia	Jiang Cuihua; China
2004 Athens	Anna Meares; Australia	Jiang Yonghua; China	Natallia Tsylinskaya; Belarus

== All-time medal table (women's) 1984–Present ==
Rank	Nation	Gold	Silver	Bronze	Total
1	Great Britain	11	6	2	19
2	Netherlands	11	3	9	23
3	France	7	5	1	13
4	United States	5	8	6	19
5	Italy	5	1	3	9
6	Australia	4	5	5	14
7	Germany	4	5	3	12
8	New Zealand	3	3	1	7
9	Russia	2	4	5	11
10	China	2	3	3	8
11	Colombia	2	1	1	4
12	Switzerland	1	3	4	8
13	Canada	1	2	5	8
14	Sweden	1	2	0	3
15	Soviet Union	1	0	1	2
16	Austria	1	0	0	1
16	Estonia	1	0	0	1
16	Norway	1	0	0	1
19	Poland	0	2	0	2
20	West Germany	0	1	1	2
21	Cuba	0	1	0	1
21	East Germany	0	1	0	1
21	Mexico	0	1	0	1
24	ROC (ROC)	0	0	2	2
24	Spain	0	0	2	2
24	Ukraine	0	0	2	2
27	Belarus	0	0	1	1
27	Belgium	0	0	1	1
27	Hong Kong	0	0	1	1
27	Lithuania	0	0	1	1
Totals (30 entries)		63	57	60	180
