= 2007 UCI Track Cycling World Championships – Women's keirin =

Women's keirin at the 2007 UCI Track Cycling World Championships
- Venue: Palma Arena
- Location: Palma de Mallorca, Spain
- Date: 1 April 2007

Medalists
gold medal	Victoria Pendleton	Great Britain
silver medal	Guo Shuang	China
bronze medal	Anna Meares	Australia

The Women's keirin was one of the 7 women's events held at the 2007 UCI Track Cycling World Championships, held in Palma de Mallorca, Spain.

22 cyclists from 15 countries participated in the contest. After the 4 qualifying heats, the fastest 2 riders in each heat advance to the second round. The remaining ones face a first round repechage.

The riders that did not advance to the second round race in 2 repechage heats. The first 2 riders in each heat advance to the second round along with the 8 that qualified before.

The first 3 riders from each of the 2 Second Round heats advance to the Final and the remaining will race a consolation 7-12 final.

The whole event took place on April 1. The First Round and Repechage on the morning session and the Second Round and Finals on the evening session. The Final started at 18:40.

== First round ==
=== Heat 1 ===
Rank	Name	Country	Q
1	Dana Glöss	Germany	Q
2	Guo Shuang	China	Q
3	Diana García	Colombia	R
4	Lisandra Guerra Rodriguez	Cuba	R
5	Sandie Clair	France	R

=== Heat 2 ===
Rank	Name	Country	Q
1	Victoria Pendleton	Great Britain	Q
2	Christin Muche	Germany	Q
3	Natallia Tsylinskaya	Belarus	R
4	Helena Casas Roige	Spain	R
5	Kristine Bayley	Australia	R

=== Heat 3 ===
Rank	Name	Country	Q
1	Willy Kanis	Netherlands	Q
2	Anna Blyth	Great Britain	Q
3	Simona Krupeckaitė	Lithuania	R
4	Oksana Grishina	Russia	R
5	Daniela Grelui Larreal	Venezuela	R
6	Jane Gerisch	Germany	R

=== Heat 4 ===
Rank	Name	Country	Q
1	Anna Meares	Australia	Q
2	Jennie Reed	United States	Q
3	Miriam Welte	Germany	R
4	Swetlana Grankowskaja	Russia	R
5	Annalisa Cucinotta	Italy	R
	Clara Sanchez	France	DNS

== First Round Repechage ==
=== Heat 1 ===
Rank	Name	Country	Q
1	Natallia Tsylinskaya	Belarus	Q
2	Oksana Grishina	Russia	Q
3	Lisandra Guerra Rodriguez	Cuba	
4	Annalisa Cucinotta	Italy	
5	Miriam Welte	Germany	
6	Kristine Bayley	Australia	
	Jane Gerisch	Germany	REL

=== Heat 2 ===
Rank	Name	Country	Q
1	Simona Krupeckaitė	Lithuania	Q
2	Sandie Clair	France	Q
3	Swetlana Grankowskaja	Russia	
4	Daniela Grelui Larreal	Venezuela	
5	Diana García	Colombia	
6	Helena Casas Roige	Spain	

== Second round ==
=== Heat 1 ===
Rank	Name	Country	Q
1	Anna Meares	Australia	Q
2	Christin Muche	Germany	Q
3	Anna Blyth	Great Britain	Q
4	Dana Glöss	Germany	
5	Natallia Tsylinskaya	Belarus	
6	Sandie Clair	France	

=== Heat 2 ===
Rank	Name	Country	Q
1	Victoria Pendleton	Great Britain	Q
2	Guo Shuang	China	Q
3	Jennie Reed	United States	Q
4	Oksana Grishina	Russia	
5	Simona Krupeckaitė	Lithuania	
6	Willy Kanis	Netherlands	

== Finals ==
=== Final 1-6 ===
Rank	Name	Country
	Victoria Pendleton	Great Britain
	Guo Shuang	China
	Anna Meares	Australia
4	Anna Blyth	Great Britain
5	Jennie Reed	United States
DSQ	Christin Muche	Germany

=== Final 7-12 ===
Rank	Name	Country
7	Natallia Tsylinskaya	Belarus
8	Willy Kanis	Netherlands
9	Sandie Clair	France
10	Oksana Grishina	Russia
11	Dana Glöss	Germany
12	Simona Krupeckaitė	Lithuania
