= 2005 UCI Track Cycling World Championships – Women's 500 m time trial =

Rainbow jersey

The Women's 500m Time Trial was one of the 6 women's events at the 2005 UCI Track Cycling World Championships, held in Los Angeles, United States.

18 Cyclists from 14 countries were due to participate in the contest, Christin Muche of Germany did not start. The Final was held on March 24 at 19:35.

== World record ==
World Record
WR	33.952	Anna Meares (AUS)	Athens (Greece)	August 20, 2004

== Final ==
Rank	Name	250m	Time	Speed (km/h)
Rank	Name	250m	250-500	Speed (km/h)
	Natallia Tsylinskaya (BLR)	19.453 (2)	34.738	51.816
	Natallia Tsylinskaya (BLR)		15.285 (5)	51.816
	Anna Meares (AUS)	19.484 (3)	34.752	51.795
	Anna Meares (AUS)		15.268 (3)	51.795
	Yvonne Hijgenaar (NED)	19.703 (4)	34.928	51.534
	Yvonne Hijgenaar (NED)		15.225 (2)	51.534
4	Willy Kanis (NED)	19.233 (1)	35.056	51.346
4	Willy Kanis (NED)		15.823 (12)	51.346
5	Victoria Pendleton (GBR)	19.815 (5)	35.088	51.299
5	Victoria Pendleton (GBR)		15.273 (4)	51.299
6	Tamilla Abassova (RUS)	19.954 (8)	35.109	51.268
6	Tamilla Abassova (RUS)		15.155 (1)	51.268
7	Lori-Ann Muenzer (CAN)	19.824 (6)	35.217	51.111
7	Lori-Ann Muenzer (CAN)		15.393 (7)	51.111
8	Simona Krupeckaitė (LTU)	19.941 (7)	35.376	50.881
8	Simona Krupeckaitė (LTU)		15.435 (8)	50.881
9	Elisa Frisoni (ITA)	20.085 (11)	35.395	50.854
9	Elisa Frisoni (ITA)		15.310 (6)	50.854
10	Céline Nivert (FRA)	19.996 (9)	35.628	50.522
10	Céline Nivert (FRA)		15.632 (10)	50.522
11	Clara Sanchez (FRA)	20.186 (15)	35.730	50.377
11	Clara Sanchez (FRA)		15.544 (9)	50.377
12	Fang Tian (CHN)	20.183 (14)	35.974	50.036
12	Fang Tian (CHN)		15.791 (11)	50.036
13	Rebecca Conzelman (USA)	20.057 (10)	36.074	49.897
13	Rebecca Conzelman (USA)		16.017 (14)	49.897
14	Susann Panzer (GER)	20.129 (12)	36.122	49.831
14	Susann Panzer (GER)		15.993 (13)	49.831
15	Nancy Contreras (MEX)	20.159 (13)	36.343	49.528
15	Nancy Contreras (MEX)		16.184 (15)	49.528
16	Magdalena Sara (POL)	20.727 (16)	36.983	48.671
16	Magdalena Sara (POL)		16.256 (16)	48.671
17	Alena Prudnikova (RUS)	20.908 (17)	37.497	48.003
17	Alena Prudnikova (RUS)		16.589 (17)	48.003
	Christin Muche (GER)	20.353 (16)	DNS	
