= UCI Track Cycling World Championships – Women's 500 m/1 km time trial =

The UCI Track Cycling World Championships – Women's 500 m/1 km time trial is the women's world championship 500 m/1 km Time Trial event held annually at the UCI Track Cycling World Championships.

Félicia Ballanger of France, and Natalya Tsylinskaya (née Markovnichenko) of Belarus, are the most successful riders in the history of the event with five titles each. Anna Meares of Australia, with nine medals (as of 2015) including four golds is the most decorated time trialist in the history of the event. From 2025 on, the duration was changed from 500 m to 1 km.

== 500 m ==
=== Medalists ===
Championships	Gold	Silver	Bronze
1995 Bogotá	Félicia Ballanger (FRA)	Galina Yenuchina (RUS)	Michelle Ferris (AUS)
1996 Manchester	Félicia Ballanger (FRA)	Anett Neumann (GER)	Michelle Ferris (AUS)
1997 Perth	Félicia Ballanger (FRA)	Michelle Ferris (AUS)	Magali Faure (FRA)
1998 Bordeaux	Félicia Ballanger (FRA)	Tanya Dubnicoff (CAN)	Michelle Ferris (AUS)
1999 Antwerp	Félicia Ballanger (FRA)	Jiang Cuihua (CHN)	Ulrike Weichelt (GER)
2000 Manchester	Natalya Markovnichenko (BLR)	Jiang Cuihua (CHN)	Wang Yan (CHN)
2001 Antwerp	Nancy Contreras (MEX)	Lori-Ann Muenzer (CAN)	Katrin Meinke (GER)
2002 Copenhagen	Natalya Tsylinskaya (BLR)	Nancy Contreras (MEX)	Kerrie Meares (AUS)
2003 Stuttgart	Natalya Tsylinskaya (BLR)	Nancy Contreras (MEX)	Jiang Cuihua (CHN)
2004 Melbourne	Anna Meares (AUS)	Jiang Yonghua (CHN)	Simona Krupeckaitė (LTU)
2005 Los Angeles	Natalya Tsylinskaya (BLR)	Anna Meares (AUS)	Yvonne Hijgenaar (NED)
2006 Bordeaux	Natalya Tsylinskaya (BLR)	Anna Meares (AUS)	Lisandra Guerra (CUB)
2007 Palma de Mallorca	Anna Meares (AUS)	Lisandra Guerra (CUB)	Natalya Tsylinskaya (BLR)
2008 Manchester	Lisandra Guerra (CUB)	Simona Krupeckaitė (LTU)	Sandie Clair (FRA)
2009 Pruszków	Simona Krupeckaitė (LTU)	Anna Meares (AUS)	Victoria Pendleton (GBR)
2010 Ballerup	Anna Meares (AUS)	Simona Krupeckaitė (LTU)	Olga Panarina (BLR)
2011 Apeldoorn	Olga Panarina (BLR)	Sandie Clair (FRA)	Miriam Welte (GER)
2012 Melbourne	Anna Meares (AUS)	Miriam Welte (GER)	Jessica Varnish (GBR)
2013 Minsk	Lee Wai Sze (HKG)	Miriam Welte (GER)	Becky James (GBR)
2014 Cali	Miriam Welte (GER)	Anna Meares (AUS)	Anastasia Voynova (RUS)
2015 Yvelines	Anastasia Voynova (RUS)	Anna Meares (AUS)	Miriam Welte (GER)
2016 London	Anastasia Voynova (RUS)	Lee Wai Sze (HKG)	Elis Ligtlee (NED)
2017 Hong Kong	Daria Shmeleva (RUS)	Miriam Welte (GER)	Anastasia Voynova (RUS)
2018 Apeldoorn	Miriam Welte (GER)	Daria Shmeleva (RUS)	Elis Ligtlee (NED)
2019 Pruszków	Daria Shmeleva (RUS)	Olena Starikova (UKR)	Kaarle McCulloch (AUS)
2020 Berlin	Lea Friedrich (GER)	Jessica Salazar (MEX)	Miriam Vece (ITA)
2021 Roubaix	Lea Friedrich (GER)	Anastasia Voynova (RCF)	Daria Shmeleva (RCF)
2022 Saint-Quentin-en-Yvelines	Taky Marie-Divine Kouamé (FRA)	Emma Hinze (GER)	Guo Yufang (CHN)
2023 Glasgow	Emma Hinze (GER)	Kristina Clonan (AUS)	Lea Friedrich (GER)
2024 Ballerup	Yana Burlakova; AIN	Sophie Capewell (GBR)	Katy Marchant (GBR)

=== Medal table ===
Rank	Nation	Gold	Silver	Bronze	Total
1	France	6	1	2	9
2	Belarus	6	0	2	8
3	Germany	5	5	5	15
4	Australia	4	7	5	16
5	Russia	4	2	2	8
6	Mexico	1	3	0	4
7	Lithuania	1	2	1	4
8	Cuba	1	1	1	3
9	Hong Kong	1	1	0	2
10	Authorised Neutral Athletes	1	0	0	1
11	China	0	3	3	6
12	Canada	0	2	0	2
13	Great Britain	0	1	4	5
14	Russian Cycling Federation	0	1	1	2
15	Ukraine	0	1	0	1
16	Netherlands	0	0	3	3
17	Italy	0	0	1	1
Totals (17 entries)		30	30	30	90

== 1 km ==
=== Medalists ===
Championships	Gold	Silver	Bronze
2025 Santiago	Hetty van de Wouw (NED)	Yana Burlakova; AIN	Ellesse Andrews (NZL)
2026 Shanghai	Pauline Grabosch (GER)	Hetty van de Wouw (NED)	Sofie van Rooijen (NED)

=== Medal table ===
Rank	Nation	Gold	Silver	Bronze	Total
1	Netherlands	1	1	1	3
2	Germany	1	0	0	1
3	Authorised Neutral Athletes	0	1	0	1
4	New Zealand	0	0	1	1
Totals (4 entries)		2	2	2	6
