= 2003 UCI Track Cycling World Championships – Women's 500 m time trial =

The Women's 500m Time Trial was one of the 6 women's events at the 2003 UCI Track Cycling World Championships, held in Stuttgart, Germany.

20 Cyclists from 17 countries were due to participate in the race, Evgenia Radanova of Bulgaria did not start. The Final was held on July 31 at 19:15.

== World record ==
World Record
WR	34.000	Jiang Yonghua (CHN)	Kunming (China)	August 11, 2002

== Final ==
Rank	Name	285m	Time	Speed (km/h)
Rank	Name	285m	285-500	Speed (km/h)
	Natallia Tsylinskaya (BLR)	21.308 (1)	34.078	52.820
	Natallia Tsylinskaya (BLR)		12.770 (1)	52.820
	Nancy Contreras (MEX)	21.547 (2)	34.515	52.149
	Nancy Contreras (MEX)		12.969 (4)	52.149
	Jiang Cuihua (CHN)	21.950 (8)	34.746	51.804
	Jiang Cuihua (CHN)		12.796 (2)	51.804
4	Yvonne Hijgenaar (NED)	21.602 (4)	34.763	51.779
4	Yvonne Hijgenaar (NED)		13.161 (8)	51.779
5	Jiang Yonghua (CHN)	21.593 (3)	34.847	51.654
5	Jiang Yonghua (CHN)		13.254 (13)	51.654
6	Lori-Ann Muenzer (CAN)	21.744 (5)	34.861	51.633
6	Lori-Ann Muenzer (CAN)		13.117 (7)	51.633
7	Victoria Pendleton (GBR)	22.067 (12)	34.927	51.536
7	Victoria Pendleton (GBR)		12.860 (3)	51.536
8	Kathrin Freitag (GER)	21.932 (7)	35.008	51.416
8	Kathrin Freitag (GER)		13.076 (6)	51.416
9	Anna Meares (AUS)	21.868 (6)	35.093	51.371
9	Anna Meares (AUS)		13.171 (9)	51.371
10	Katrin Meinke (GER)	21.994 (9)	35.191	51.149
10	Katrin Meinke (GER)		13.197 (10)	51.149
11	Kerrie Meares (AUS)	22.029 (10)	35.447	50.780
11	Kerrie Meares (AUS)		13.418 (16)	50.780
12	Clara Sanchez (FRA)	22.061 (11)	35.492	50.715
12	Clara Sanchez (FRA)		13.431 (17)	50.715
13	Sayuri Osuga (JPN)	22.211 (13)	35.496	50.709
13	Sayuri Osuga (JPN)		13.285 (14)	50.709
14	Tamilla Abassova (RUS)	22.282 (14)	35.516	50.681
14	Tamilla Abassova (RUS)		13.234 (12)	50.681
15	Simona Krupeckaitė (LTU)	22.460 (16)	35.534	50.655
15	Simona Krupeckaitė (LTU)		13.074 (5)	50.655
16	Tanya Lindenmuth (USA)	22.550 (18)	35.773	50.317
16	Tanya Lindenmuth (USA)		13.223 (11)	50.317
17	Yumari González (CUB)	22.531 (17)	35.882	50.164
17	Yumari González (CUB)		13.351 (15))	50.164
18	Oxana Grishina (RUS)	22.457 (15)	36.032	49.955
18	Oxana Grishina (RUS)		13.575 (18)	49.955
	Evgenia Radanova (BUL)		DNS	
