= Cycling at the 2004 Summer Olympics – Women's track time trial =

Cycling at the Olympics

The women's 500 metre time trial in cycling at the 2004 Summer Olympics was a time trial race in which each of the twelve cyclists attempted to set the fastest time for two laps (500 metres) of the track.

In a field of personal bests, 20-year-old World Champion for the 500 m time trial, Anna Meares from Australia, set a new world record to claim the gold medal in 33.952 seconds. The previous world record was held by Yonghua Jiang of China, who minutes previously had set a new Olympic record in this event to claim the silver medal with a time of 34.112 seconds. Natallia Tsylinskaya from Belarus was awarded the bronze medal.

== Medalists ==
| Gold | Silver | Bronze |
| Anna Meares (AUS) | Jiang Yonghua (CHN) | Natallia Tsylinskaya (BLR) |

== Records ==
Anna Meares's time of 33.952 seconds in the event set a new world record, beatingJiang Yonghua's world record and Félicia Ballanger's Olympic record.

| World Record | Jiang Yonghua (CHN) | Kunming, China P.R. | 34.000 s | 11 August 2002 |
| Olympic Record | Félicia Ballanger (FRA) | Sydney, Australia | 34.140 s | 16 September 2000 |

== Results ==
Final results
| Rank | Race Number | Name | Country | 250 m Time | 500 m Time |
|---|---|---|---|---|---|
| 1st place, gold medalist(s) | 3 | Anna Meares | Australia | 19.164 | 33.952 WR |
| 2nd place, silver medalist(s) | 7 | Jiang Yonghua | China | 19.192 | 34.112 |
| 3rd place, bronze medalist(s) | 4 | Natallia Tsylinskaya | Belarus | 19.305 | 34.167 |
| 4 | 23 | Simona Krupeckaitė | Lithuania | 19.517 | 34.317 |
| 5 | 26 | Yvonne Hijgenaar | Netherlands | 19.519 | 34.532 |
| 6 | 16 | Victoria Pendleton | Great Britain | 19.696 | 34.626 |
| 7 | 6 | Lori-Ann Muenzer | Canada | 19.630 | 34.628 |
| 8 | 24 | Nancy Contreras Reyes | Mexico | 19.523 | 34.783 |
| 9 | 32 | Svetlana Grankovskaya | Russia | 19.739 | 34.797 |
| 10 | 21 | Sayuri Osuga | Japan | 19.704 | 35.045 |
| 11 | 17 | Katrin Meinke | Germany | 19.789 | 35.088 |
| 12 | 30 | Tamilla Abassova | Russia | 19.982 | 35.147 |

== See also ==
- Track time trial
- Cycling at the 2004 Summer Olympics – Men's track time trial
- Cycling at the 2008 Summer Olympics – Women's BMX
