= 2007 UCI Track Cycling World Championships – Women's 500 m time trial =

Women's 500 m time trial at the 2007 UCI Track Cycling World Championships
- Venue: Palma Arena
- Location: Palma de Mallorca, Spain
- Date: 31 March 2007
- Winning time: 33.588

Medalists
gold medal	Anna Meares	Australia
silver medal	Lisandra Guerra	Cuba
bronze medal	Natallia Tsylinskaya	Belarus

The Women's 500m Time Trial is one of the 7 women's events at the 2007 UCI Track Cycling World Championships, held in Palma de Mallorca, Spain.

21 Cyclists from 15 countries participated in the contest. The Final was held on March 31, at 17:15.

== World record ==
World Record
WR	33.944	Anna Meares (AUS)	Sydney (Australia)	November 18, 2006

== Final ==
Rank	Name	250m	Time	Speed (km/h)
Rank	Name	250m	250-500	Speed (km/h)
	Anna Meares (AUS)	19.035 (1)	33.588 WR	53.590
	Anna Meares (AUS)		14.553 (1)	53.590
	Lisandra Guerra (CUB)	19.149 (2)	34.015	52.917
	Lisandra Guerra (CUB)		14.866 (2)	52.917
	Natallia Tsylinskaya (BLR)	19.334 (3)	34.430	52.279
	Natallia Tsylinskaya (BLR)		15.096 (4)	52.279
4	Simona Krupeckaitė (LTU)	19.511 (6)	34.487	52.193
4	Simona Krupeckaitė (LTU)		14.976 (3)	52.193
5	Shanaze Reade (GBR)	19.369 (4)	34.633	51.973
5	Shanaze Reade (GBR)		15.264 (8)	51.973
6	Willy Kanis (NED)	19.377 (5)	34.700	51.873
6	Willy Kanis (NED)		15.323 (9)	51.873
7	Yvonne Hijgenaar (NED)	19.633 (8)	34.776	51.759
7	Yvonne Hijgenaar (NED)		15.143 (5)	51.759
8	Anna Blyth (GBR)	19.706 (10)	34.870	51.620
8	Anna Blyth (GBR)		15.164 (6)	51.620
9	Sandie Clair (FRA)	19.528 (7)	34.892	51.587
9	Sandie Clair (FRA)		15.365 (11)	51.587
10	Virginie Cueff (FRA)	19.989 (14)	35.159	51.195
10	Virginie Cueff (FRA)		15.170 (7)	51.195
11	Kristine Bayley (AUS)	19.636 (9)	35.264	51.043
11	Kristine Bayley (AUS)		15.628 (16)	51.043
12	Jane Gerisch (GER)	19.925 (13)	35.471	50.745
12	Jane Gerisch (GER)		15.477 (13)	50.745
13	Tian Fang (CHN)	20.125 (15)	35.471	50.745
13	Tian Fang (CHN)		15.346 (10)	50.745
14	Gong Jinjie (CHN)	19.730 (11)	35.473	50.742
14	Gong Jinjie (CHN)		15.743 (18)	50.742
15	Miriam Welte (GER)	20.139 (16)	35.619	50.534
15	Miriam Welte (GER)		15.480 (14)	50.534
16	Tamilla Abassova (RUS)	20.215 (17)	35.625	50.526
16	Tamilla Abassova (RUS)		15.410 (12)	50.526
17	Nancy Contreras (MEX)	19.917 (12)	35.754	50.344
17	Nancy Contreras (MEX)		15.837 (19)	50.344
18	Diana García (COL)	20.414 (18)	36.063	49.912
18	Diana García (COL)		15.649 (17)	49.912
19	Lyubov Shulika (UKR)	20.649 (19)	36.272	49.912
19	Lyubov Shulika (UKR)		15.623 (15)	49.912
20	Magdalena Sara (POL)	20.909 (21)	36.919	48.755
20	Magdalena Sara (POL)		16.010 (20)	48.755
21	Helena Casas (ESP)	20.770 (20)	37.010	48.635
21	Helena Casas (ESP)		16.240 (21)	48.635
