= Cycling at the 2004 Summer Olympics – Women's sprint =

Cycling at the Olympics

Women's cycling sprint at the Games of the XXVIII Olympiad
- Venue: Athens Olympic Velodrome
- Date: 22–24 August 2004
- Competitors: 12 from 11 nations

Medalists
1st place, gold medalist(s)		Lori-Ann Muenzer	Canada
2nd place, silver medalist(s)		Tamilla Abassova	Russia
3rd place, bronze medalist(s)		Anna Meares	Australia

The women's sprint event in cycling at the 2004 Summer Olympics consisted of a series of head-to-head matches in which cyclists made three laps around the track. Only the time for the last 200 metres of the 750 metres covered was counted as official time.

== Medalists ==
Gold	Silver	Bronze
Lori-Ann Muenzer (CAN)	Tamilla Abassova (RUS)	Anna Meares (AUS)

== Records ==
World Record	Olga Slyusareva (RUS)	Moscow, Russia	10.831 s	25 April 1993
Olympic Record	Michelle Ferris (AUS)	Atlanta, United States	11.212 s	24 July 1996

=== Qualifying round ===
Each cyclist covered the course individually in the qualifying round. The times were used to seed the twelve riders for the 1/8 finals.

Rank	Name	Time (s)	Avg. Speed (km/h)
1	Anna Meares (AUS)	11.291	63.767
2	Natallia Tsylinskaya (BLR)	11.364	63.357
3	Tamilla Abassova (RUS)	11.364	63.357
4	Lori-Ann Muenzer (CAN)	11.380	63.268
5	Yvonne Hijgenaar (NED)	11.400	63.157
6	Simona Krupeckaitė (LTU)	11.430	62.992
7	Svetlana Grankovskaya (RUS)	11.456	62.849
8	Daniela Larreal (VEN)	11.597	62.085
9	Jennie Reed (USA)	11.622	61.951
10	Victoria Pendleton (GBR)	11.646	61.823
11	Katrin Meinke (GER)	11.655	61.776
12	Evgenia Radanova (BUL)	12.457	57.798

=== 1/8 final ===
The twelve cyclists competed in six matches of two cyclists each. Winners advanced to the quarterfinals while the defeated riders received a second chance in the 1/8 repechage.

Heat	Pos	Rider	Time
Heat 1	1	Anna Meares (AUS)	11.927
Heat 1	2	Evgenia Radanova (BUL)	
Heat 2	1	Natallia Tsylinskaya (BLR)	11.846
Heat 2	2	Katrin Meinke (GER)	
Heat 3	1	Tamilla Abassova (RUS)	11.714
Heat 3	2	Victoria Pendleton (GBR)	
Heat 4	1	Lori-Ann Muenzer (CAN)	11.881
Heat 4	2	Jennie Reed (USA)	
Heat 5	1	Daniela Larreal (VEN)	11.849
Heat 5	2	Yvonne Hijgenaar (NED)	
Heat 6	1	Simona Krupeckaitė (LTU)	11.872
Heat 6	2	Svetlana Grankovskaya (RUS)	

==== 1/8 repechage ====
The 1/8 repechage consisted of two heats of three cyclists, with the six riders that had been defeated in the 1/8 final competing. The winner of each of the heats returned to the main competition and advanced to the quarterfinal. The losers of the repechage competed in the 9th to 12th place classification.

Heat	Time	Speed	Pos	Rider	Country
Heat 1	12.015 s	59.925 km/h			
Heat 1	12.015 s	59.925 km/h	1	Svetlana Grankovskaya	Russia
Heat 1	12.015 s	59.925 km/h	2	Jennie Reed	United States
Heat 1	12.015 s	59.925 km/h	3	Evgenia Radanova	Bulgaria
Heat 2	12.132 s	59.347 km/h			
Heat 2	12.132 s	59.347 km/h	1	Katrin Meinke	Germany
Heat 2	12.132 s	59.347 km/h	2	Yvonne Hijgenaar	Netherlands
Heat 2	12.132 s	59.347 km/h	3	Victoria Pendleton	Great Britain

==== Classification 9-12 ====
The 9-12 classification was one race in which all four losers from the 1/8 repechage competed. The winner of the classification took 9th place, with the following three places going to the other cyclists in order.

Pos	Rider	Country	Time	Speed
1	Victoria Pendleton	Great Britain	12.699 s	56.697 km/h
2	Jennie Reed	United States		
3	Yvonne Hijgenaar	Netherlands		
4	Evgenia Radanova	Bulgaria		

=== Quarterfinals ===
The quarterfinals pitted the eight cyclists against each other in four pairwise matches. Each match was a best-of-three race competition. Winners advanced to the semifinals while the losers competed in the 5th to 8th place classification.

Heat	Time	Pos	Rider	Country
Heat 1	1st race: 11.916 s 2nd race: 12.048 s			
Heat 1	1st race: 11.916 s 2nd race: 12.048 s	1	Anna Meares	Australia
Heat 1	1st race: 11.916 s 2nd race: 12.048 s	2	Katrin Meinke	Germany
Heat 2	1st race: 11.945 s 2nd race: 12.085 s			
Heat 2	1st race: 11.945 s 2nd race: 12.085 s	1	Svetlana Grankovskaya	Russia
Heat 2	1st race: 11.945 s 2nd race: 12.085 s	2	Natallia Tsylinskaya	Belarus
Heat 3
Heat 3	1st race: 11.993 s 3rd race: 11.914 s	1	Tamilla Abassova	Russia
Heat 3	2nd race: 12.632 s	2	Simona Krupeckaitė	Lithuania
Heat 4	1st race: 12.064 s 2nd race: 11.888 s			
Heat 4	1st race: 12.064 s 2nd race: 11.888 s	1	Lori-Ann Muenzer	Canada
Heat 4	1st race: 12.064 s 2nd race: 11.888 s	2	Daniela Greluis Larreal Chirinos	Venezuela

==== Classification 5-8 ====
The 5-8 classification was one race in which all four losers from the quarterfinals competed. The winner of the classification took 5th place, with the following three places going to the other cyclists in order.

Pos	Rider	Country	Time	Speed
1	Natallia Tsylinskaya	Belarus	11.364 s	63.357 km/h
2	Katrin Meinke	Germany		
DNF	Simona Krupeckaitė	Lithuania		
DSQ	Daniela Greluis Larreal Chirinos	Venezuela		

=== Semifinals ===
The semifinals were again best-of-three matches. Winners advanced to the final, while losers competed for the bronze medal.

Heat	Time	Pos	Rider	Country
SF 1
SF 1	2nd race: 12.101 s 3rd race: 12.185 s	1	Lori-Ann Muenzer	Canada
SF 1	1st race: 11.802 s	2	Anna Meares	Australia
SF 2
SF 2	2nd race: 11.965 s 3rd race: 11.894 s	1	Tamilla Abassova	Russia
SF 2	1st race: 11.893 s	2	Svetlana Grankovskaya	Russia

==== Bronze medal match ====
The bronze medal match was best-of-three.

Pos.	Rider	Country	Time
1	Anna Meares	Australia	1st race: 12.042 s 2nd race: 11.822 s
2	Svetlana Grankovskaya	Russia	

=== Final ===
The final was a best-of-three match; Muenzer won the first two races to eliminate the need for a third.

Pos.	Rider	Country	Time
1	Lori-Ann Muenzer	Canada	1st race: 12.126 s 2nd race: 12.140 s
2	Tamilla Abassova	Russia	

== Final classification ==
The final classification was

1. Lori-Ann Muenzer (CAN)
2. Tamilla Abassova (RUS)
3. Anna Meares (AUS)
4. Svetlana Grankovskaya (RUS)
5. Natallia Tsylinskaya (BLR)
6. Katrin Meinke (GER)
7. Simona Krupeckaitė (LTU)
8. Daniela Larreal (VEN)
9. Victoria Pendleton (GBR)
10. Jennie Reed (USA)
11. Yvonne Hijgenaar (NED)
12. Evgenia Radanova (BUL)
