= 2006 UCI Track Cycling World Championships – Women's 500 m time trial =

Athletic competition

Rainbow jersey

The Women's 500m Time Trial was one of the 6 women's events at the 2006 UCI Track Cycling World Championships, held in Bordeaux, France.

17 Cyclists from 13 countries participated in the contest. The Final was held on April 13 at 18:35.

== World record ==
World Record
WR	33.952	Anna Meares (AUS)	Athens (Greece)	August 20, 2004

== Final ==
Rank	Name	250m	Time	Speed (km/h)
Rank	Name	250m	250-500	Speed (km/h)
	Natallia Tsylinskaya (BLR)	19.324 (2)	34.152	52.706
	Natallia Tsylinskaya (BLR)		14.828 (1)	52.706
	Anna Meares (AUS)	19.413 (3)	34.352	52.399
	Anna Meares (AUS)		14.939 (3)	52.399
	Lizandra Guerra (CUB)	19.218 (1)	34.609	52.010
	Lizandra Guerra (CUB)		15.391 (8)	52.010
4	Victoria Pendleton (GBR)	19.608 (5)	34.614	52.002
4	Victoria Pendleton (GBR)		15.006 (4)	52.002
5	Simona Krupeckaitė (LTU)	19.735 (7)	34.668	51.921
5	Simona Krupeckaitė (LTU)		14.933 (2)	51.921
6	Guo Shuang (CHN)	19.601 (4)	34.717	51.848
6	Guo Shuang (CHN)		15.116 (5)	51.848
7	Sandie Clair (FRA)	19.651 (6)	35.114	51.262
7	Sandie Clair (FRA)		15.463 (11)	51.262
8	Céline Nivert (FRA)	19.772 (8)	35.187	51.115
8	Céline Nivert (FRA)		15.415 (9)	51.115
9	Tamilla Abassova (RUS)	20.005 (13)	35.262	51.046
9	Tamilla Abassova (RUS)		15.257 (7)	51.046
10	Yvonne Hijgenaar (NED)	19.879 (11)	35.330	50.948
10	Yvonne Hijgenaar (NED)		15.451 (10)	50.948
11	Elisa Frisoni (ITA)	20.214 (15)	35.384	50.870
11	Elisa Frisoni (ITA)		15.170 (6)	50.870
12	Nancy Contreras (MEX)	19.869 (10)	35.399	50.849
12	Nancy Contreras (MEX)		15.530 (13)	50.849
13	Dana Gloss (GER)	19.939 (12)	35.510	50.690
13	Dana Gloss (GER)		15.571 (15)	50.690
14	Kerrie Meares (AUS)	19.843 (9)	35.551	50.631
14	Kerrie Meares (AUS)		15.708 (17)	50.631
15	Miriam Welte (GER)	20.160 (14)	35.665	50.470
15	Miriam Welte (GER)		15.505 (12)	50.470
16	Magdalena Sara (POL)	20.449 (17)	36.005	49.993
16	Magdalena Sara (POL)		15.556 (14)	49.993
17	Diana García (COL)	20.353 (16)	36.060	49.917
17	Diana García (COL)		15.707 (16)	49.917
