= 2004 UCI Track Cycling World Championships – Women's 500 m time trial =

Rainbow jersey

The Women's 500m Time Trial was one of the 6 women's events at the 2004 UCI Track Cycling World Championships, held in Melbourne, Australia.

17 Cyclists from 15 countries participated in the race. The Final was held on 30 May at 13:40.

== World record ==
World Record
WR	34.000	Jiang Yonghua (CHN)	Kunming (China)	11 August 2002

== Final ==
Rank	Name	250m	Time	Speed (km/h)
Rank	Name	250m	250–500	Speed (km/h)
	Anna Meares (AUS)	19.483 (2)	34.342	52.413
	Anna Meares (AUS)		14.859 (1)	52.413
	Jiang Yonghua (CHN)	19.398 (1)	34.675	51.910
	Jiang Yonghua (CHN)		15.277 (7)	51.910
	Simona Krupeckaitė (LTU)	19.747 (5)	34.788	51.741
	Simona Krupeckaitė (LTU)		15.041 (2)	51.741
4	Yvonne Hijgenaar (NED)	19.567 (3)	34.859	51.636
4	Yvonne Hijgenaar (NED)		15.292 (8)	51.636
5	Natallia Tsylinskaya (BLR)	19.693 (4)	34.913	51.556
5	Natallia Tsylinskaya (BLR)		15.220 (46)	51.556
6	Jiang Cuihua (CHN)	19.793 (7)	34.953	51.497
6	Jiang Cuihua (CHN)		15.160 (5)	51.497
7	Tamilla Abassova (RUS)	20.059 (9)	35.193	51.146
7	Tamilla Abassova (RUS)		15.134 (4)	51.146
8	Elisa Frisoni (ITA)	19.897 (8)	35.250	51.063
8	Elisa Frisoni (ITA)		15.353 (10)	51.063
9	Nancy Contreras (MEX)	19.764 (6)	35.313	50.972
9	Nancy Contreras (MEX)		15.549 (11)	50.972
10	Victoria Pendleton (GBR)	20.261 (14)	35.360	50.904
10	Victoria Pendleton (GBR)		15.099 (3)	50.904
11	Lori-Ann Muenzer (CAN)	20.154 (11)	35.454	50.770
11	Lori-Ann Muenzer (CAN)		15.300 (9)	50.770
12	Clara Sanchez (FRA)	20.097 (10)	35.678	50.451
12	Clara Sanchez (FRA)		15.581 (12)	50.451
13	Tanya Lindenmuth (USA)	20.210 (12)	35.794	50.287
13	Tanya Lindenmuth (USA)		15.584 (13)	50.287
14	Antonella Bellutti (ITA)	20.222 (13)	35.815	50.258
14	Antonella Bellutti (ITA)		15.593 (14)	50.258
15	Susan Panzer (GER)	20.296 (15)	35.973	50.037
15	Susan Panzer (GER)		15.677 (15)	50.037
16	Evgenia Radanova (BUL)	21.559 (16)	37.741	47.693
16	Evgenia Radanova (BUL)		16.182 (16)	47.693
17	Anastasia Tchulkova (RUS)	21.639 (17)	38.010	47.355
17	Anastasia Tchulkova (RUS)		16.371 (17)	47.355
