= 2010–11 UCI Track Cycling World Cup Classics – Round 4 – Women's team pursuit =

Round 4 – Women's team pursuit
2010–2011 UCI Track Cycling World Cup Classics, race 4/4

Race details
- Dates: 18 February 2011
- Stages: 1
- Distance: 3 km (1.864 mi)
- Winning time: 3:19.757

Medalists
| | Gold | United Kingdom; Wendy Houvenaghel; Joanna Rowsell; Sarah Storey |
| | Silver | New Zealand; Lauren Ellis; Jaime Nielsen; Alison Shanks |
| | Bronze | Ouch Pro Cycling; Sarah Hammer; Dotsie Bausch; Jennie Reed |

The fourth round of the women's team pursuit of the 2010–2011 UCI Track Cycling World Cup Classics took place in Manchester, United Kingdom on 18 February 2011. 22 teams participated in the contest.

== Competition format ==
The women's team pursuit race consists of a 3 km race between two teams of three cyclists, starting on opposite sides of the track. If one team catches the other, the race is over.

The tournament consisted of an initial qualifying round. The top two teams in the qualifying round advanced to the gold medal match and the third and fourth teams advanced to the bronze medal race.

== Schedule ==
Friday 18 February
11:25-13:35 Qualifying
19:52-20:06 Finals
20:48-20:56 Victory Ceremony

Schedule from Tissottiming.com

== Results ==
=== Qualifying ===
| Rank | Country | Cyclists | Result | Notes |
|---|---|---|---|---|
| 1 | United Kingdom | Wendy Houvenaghel; Joanna Rowsell; Sarah Storey | 3:20.962 | Q |
| 2 | New Zealand | Lauren Ellis; Jaime Nielsen; Lauren Tamayo | 3:20.988 | Q |
| 3 | Ouch Pro Cycling | Sarah Hammer; Dotsie Bausch; Jennie Reed | 3:23.048 | q |
| 4 | Netherlands | Ellen van Dijk; Vera Koedooder; Kirsten Wild | 3:23.179 | q, NR |
| 5 | Team 100% me | Katie Colclough; Dani King; Laura Trott | 3:23.355 | |
| 6 | Australia | Melissa Hoskins; Amie Cure; Isabella King | 3:24.444 | |
| 7 | Germany | Lisa Brennauer; Charlotte Becker; Madeleine Sandig | 3:25.600 | |
| 8 | Lithuania | Aušrinė Trebaitė; Vaida Pikauskaitė; Vilija Sereikaitė | 3:27.958 | |
| 9 | Belgium | Jolien D'Hoore; Kelly Druyts; Jessie Daams | 3:28.443 | |
| 10 | South Korea | Hye Min Lee; Ri You Kim; Ah Reum Na | 3:28.947 | |
| 11 | United States | Kimberly Geist; Cari Higgins; Kristin McGrath | 3:29.312 | |
| 12 | Poland | Katarzyna Pawłowska; Edyta Jasińska; Małgorzata Wojtyra | 3:29.403 | |
| 13 | Belarus | Tatyana Sharakova; Aksana Papko; Alena Dylko | 3:29.653 | |
| 14 | China | Jiang Fan; Jiang Wenwen; Liang | 3:29.788 | |
| 15 | Ireland | Jennifer O'Reilly; Ciara Horne; Caroline Ryan | 3:30.375 | |
| 16 | Russia | Anastasia Chulkova; Victoria Kondel; Maria Mishina | 3:31.437 | |
| 17 | Giant Pro Cycling | Yali Jing; Shanshan Ma; Yu Ma | 3:31.832 | |
| 18 | Spain | Leire Olaberria Dorronsoro; Débora Gálves Lopez; Gloria Rodríguez Sánchez | 3:32.159 | |
| 19 | Italy | Elena Cecchini; Barbara Guarischi; Valentina Scandolara | 3:38.318 | |
| 20 | Mexico | Sofía Arreola Navarro; Íngrid Drexel Clouthier; Ariana Roxana León García | 3:44.456 | |
| 21 | Treads.com/DFT Cycling Team | Megan Hottman; Ruby Miller; Louise Satherley | 3:51.908 | |
| | Reyno de Navarratelcocono | Joana Eslava Fernandez; Olatz Ferran Zubilliaga; Azucena Sánchez Benito | DSQ | |

Results from Tissottiming.com.

=== Finals ===
==== Final bronze medal race ====
| Rank | Team | Cyclists | Result | Notes |
|---|---|---|---|---|
| 3rd place, bronze medalist(s) | Ouch Pro Cycling | Sarah Hammer; Dotsie Bausch; Jennie Reed | 3:23.136 | |
| 4 | Netherlands | Ellen van Dijk; Vera Koedooder; Kirsten Wild | 3:23.804 | |

==== Final gold medal race ====
| Rank | Team | Cyclists | Result | Notes |
|---|---|---|---|---|
| 1st place, gold medalist(s) | United Kingdom | Wendy Houvenaghel; Joanna Rowsell; Sarah Storey | 3:19.757 | |
| 2nd place, silver medalist(s) | New Zealand | Lauren Ellis; Jaime Nielsen; Alison Shanks | 3:20.828 | |

Results from Tissottiming.com.
