= 2010–11 UCI Track Cycling World Cup Classics – Round 4 – Women's scratch race =

Round 4 Women's scratch race
2010–2011 UCI Track Cycling World Cup Classics, race 1/1

Race details
- Dates: 19 February 2011
- Stages: 1
- Distance: 10 km (6.214 mi)
- Winning time: 13:05.884

Medalists
	Gold	Anastasia Chulkova (RUS)
	Silver	Jennie Reed (USA)
	Bronze	Amy Cure (AUS)

The women's scratch race during the fourth round of the 2010–2011 UCI Track Cycling World Cup Classics was the only women's scratch race in this season. So the winner of this race won automatically the World Cup in this discipline. It took place in Manchester, United Kingdom on 19 February 2011. 33 Athletes participated in the contest.

== Competition format ==
A scratch race is a race in which all riders start together and the object is simply to be first over the finish line after a certain number of laps. There are no intermediate points or sprints.

The tournament consisted of two qualifying heats of 7.5 km. The top twelve cyclist of each heat advanced to the 10 km final.

== Schedule ==
Saturday 18 February
14:15-14:45 Qualifying
20:06-20:22 Finals
21:22-21:30 Victory Ceremony

Schedule from Tissottiming.com

== Results ==
=== Qualifying ===
Qualifying Heat 1

Rank	Cyclist	Team	Notes
1	Kelly Druyts	Belgium	Q
2	Pascala Jeuland	France	Q
3	Katarzyna Pawłowska	Poland	Q
4	Jennie Reed	United States; OUCH Pro Cycling	Q
5	Ah Reum Na	South Korea	Q
6	Elena Cecchini	Italy	Q
7	Alžbeta Pavlendová	Slovakia	Q
8	Ellen van Dijk	Netherlands	Q
9	Shanshan Ma	China; Giant Pro Cycling	Q
10	Laura Trott	United Kingdom; Team 100% Me	Q
11	Amy Cure	Australia	Q
12	Yoanka González Perez	Cuba	Q
13	Paola Muñoz Grandon	China	
14	Megan Hottman	United States; Treads.com/DFT Cycling Team	
15	Gloria Rodríguez Sánchez	Spain	
16	Lauren Ellis	New Zealand	
17	Arantxa Garcia Morte	Spain; Catalynya Team''	

Results from Tissottiming.com.

Qualifying Heat 2

Rank	Cyclist	Team	Notes
1	Cari Higgins	United States	Q
2	Ana Usabiaga Balerdi	Spain; Cespa-Euskadi	Q
3	Elke Gebhardt	Germany	Q
4	Sofía Arreola Navarro	Mexico	Q
5	Anastasia Chulkova	Russia	Q
6	Andrea Wölfer	Switzerland	Q
7	Fatehah Mustapa	Malaysia; YSD Track Team	Q
8	Aksana Papko	Belarus	Q
9	Azucena Sánchez Benito	Spain; Reyno de Navarratelcocono	Q
10	Xiao Juan Diao	Hong Kong	Q
11	Michelle Lauge Jensen	Denmark	Q
12	Allison Beveridge	Canada	Q
13	Vaida Pikauskaitė	Lithuania	
14	Caroline Ryan	Ireland	
15	Kimbeley Yap	Malaysia	
	Jarmila Machačová	Czech Republic	DNF

Results from Tissottiming.com.

=== Final ===
Rank	Cyclist	Team	Notes
1st place, gold medalist(s)	Anastasia Chulkova	Russia	
2nd place, silver medalist(s)	Jennie Reed	United States; OUCH Pro Cycling	
3rd place, bronze medalist(s)	Amy Cure	Australia	
4	Sofía Arreola Navarro	Mexico	
5	Pascala Jeuland	France	
6	Elena Cecchini	Italy	
7	Fatehah Mustapa	Malaysia; YSD Track Team	
8	Kelly Druyts	Belgium	
9	Elke Gebhardt	Germany	
10	Ah Reum Na	South Korea	
11	Xiao Juan Diao	Hong Kong	
12	Shanshan Ma	China; Giant Pro Cycling	
13	Allison Beveridge	Canada	
14	Ellen van Dijk	Netherlands	
15	Laura Trott	United Kingdom; Team 100% Me	
16	Yoanka González Perez	Cuba	
17	Ana Usabiaga Balerdi	Spain; Cespa-Euskadi	
18	Alžbeta Pavlendová	Slovakia	
19	Michelle Lauge Jensen	Denmark	
20	Andrea Wölfer	Switzerland	
	Aksana Papko	Belarus	DNF
	Azucena Sánchez Benito	Spain; Reyno de Navarratelcocono	DNF
	Katarzyna Pawłowska	Poland	DNF
	Cari Higgins	United States	DNF

Results from Tissottiming.com.
