= Cycling at the 2002 Commonwealth Games – Women's sprint =

Cycling Track – Women's sprint at the 2002 Commonwealth Games
- Venue: National Cycling Centre
- Dates: 31 July – 1 August
- Competitors: 9 from 6 nations

Medalists
gold medal	Kerrie Meares	Australia
silver medal	Lori-Ann Muenzer	Canada
bronze medal	Anna Meares	Australia

The women's sprint at the 2002 Commonwealth Games was part of the cycling programme, which took place on 31 July and 1 August 2002.

== Records ==
Prior to this competition, the existing world and Games records were as follows:

World record	Olga Slyusareva (RUS)	10.831	Moscow, Russia	25 April 1993
Games record	Tanya Dubnicoff (CAN)	11.490	Kuala Lumpur, Malaysia	September 1998

== Schedule ==
The schedule is as follows:

Date	Time	Round
Wednesday, 31 July 2002	11:14	Qualifying
Wednesday, 31 July 2002	18:07	Quarterfinals
Thursday, 1 August 2002	18:00	Semifinals
Thursday, 1 August 2002	19:20	Finals

== Results ==
=== Qualifying ===
All riders will be seeded for the quarterfinals according to their times in qualification.

Rank	Rider	Time	Behind	Avg Speed (km/h)	Notes
1	Lori-Ann Muenzer (CAN)	11.452	—	62.871	Q, GR
2	Kerrie Meares (AUS)	11.581	+0.129	62.171	Q
3	Victoria Pendleton (ENG)	11.744	+0.292	61.308	Q
4	Denise Hampson (WAL)	11.814	+0.362	60.945	Q
5	Anna Meares (AUS)	11.957	+0.505	60.216	Q
6	Melanie Szubrycht (ENG)	12.426	+0.974	57.943	Q
7	Hsu Min Chung (MAS)	15.153	+3.701	47.515	Q
8	Rochelle Gilmore (AUS)	DNS			
8	Fiona Carswell (NZL)	DNS			

=== Quarter-finals ===
Heat 1

Name	Time (Race 1)	Time (Race 2)
Kerrie Meares (AUS)		
Hsu Min Chung (MAS)	DNS	

Heat 3

Name	Time (Race 1)	Time (Race 2)
Anna Meares (AUS)	12.596	12.595
Denise Hampson (WAL)		

Heat 2

Name	Time (Race 1)	Time (Race 2)
Victoria Pendleton (ENG)	12.391	12.798
Melanie Szubrycht (ENG)		

=== 5th–6th place classifications ===
Name	Time	Rank
Denise Hampson (WAL)	12.375	5
Melanie Szubrycht (ENG)		6

=== Semifinals ===
Heat 1

Name	Time (Race 1)	Time (Race 2)
Lori-Ann Muenzer (CAN)	11.963	11.914
Anna Meares (AUS)		

Heat 2

Name	Time (Race 1)	Time (Race 2)
Kerrie Meares (AUS)	12.665	12.617
Victoria Pendleton (ENG)		

Bronze medal match

Name	Time (Race 1)	Time (Race 2)	Rank
Anna Meares (AUS)	12.744	12.450	3rd place, bronze medalist(s)
Victoria Pendleton (ENG)			4

Gold medal match

Name	Time (Race 1)	Time (Race 2)	Time (Race 3)	Rank
Kerrie Meares (AUS)	DQ	12.360	12.362	1st place, gold medalist(s)
Lori-Ann Muenzer (CAN)				2nd place, silver medalist(s)
