= 2008 UCI Track Cycling World Championships – Women's keirin =

Rainbow jersey

The Women's Keirin is one of the 8 women's events at the 2008 UCI Track Cycling World Championships, held in Manchester, United Kingdom.

20 Cyclists from 16 countries participated in the contest, which was held on 29 March.

== First round ==
=== Heat 1 ===
Rank	Name	Country	Q
1	Victoria Pendleton	Great Britain	Q
2	Lisandra Guerra	Cuba	Q
3	Clara Sanchez	France	R
4	Christin Muche	Germany	R
5	Simona Krupeckaitė	Lithuania	R
6	Tsudkuda Sakie	Japan	R

=== Heat 2 ===
Rank	Name	Country	Q
1	Dana Glöss	Germany	Q
2	Swetlana Grankowskaja	Russia	Q
3	Willy Kanis	Netherlands	R
4	Kaarle McCulloch	Australia	R
5	Anna Blyth	Great Britain	R
6	Elisa Frisoni	Italy	R

=== Heat 3 ===
Rank	Name	Country	Q
1	Jennie Reed	United States	Q
2	Gong Jinjie	China	Q
3	Sandie Clair	France	R
4	Valentina Alessio	Italy	R
5	Diana García	Colombia	R
6	Jessica Varnish	Great Britain	R
DNF	Oksana Grishina	Russia	R

== First Round Repechage ==
=== Heat 1 ===
Rank	Name	Country	Q
1	Clara Sanchez	France	Q
2	Simona Krupeckaitė	Lithuania	Q
3	Jessica Varnish	Great Britain	
4	Kaarle McCulloch	Australia	

=== Heat 2 ===
Rank	Name	Country	Q
1	Willy Kanis	Netherlands	Q
2	Anna Blyth	Great Britain	Q
3	Valentina Alessio	Italy	
4	Elisa Frisoni	Italy	

=== Heat 3 ===
Rank	Name	Country	Q
1	Christin Muche	Germany	Q
2	Diana García	Colombia	Q
3	Oksana Grishina	Russia	
4	Sandie Clair	France	
5	Tsudkuda Sakie	Japan	

== Second round ==
=== Heat 1 ===
Rank	Name	Country	Q
1	Victoria Pendleton	Great Britain	Q
2	Anna Blyth	Great Britain	Q
3	Clara Sanchez	France	Q
4	Swetlana Grankowskaja	Russia	
5	Gong Jinjie	China	
6	Diana García	Colombia	

=== Heat 2 ===
Rank	Name	Country	Q
1	Christin Muche	Germany	Q
2	Jennie Reed	United States	Q
3	Simona Krupeckaitė	Lithuania	Q
4	Lisandra Guerra	Cuba	
5	Dana Glöss	Germany	
6	Willy Kanis	Netherlands	

== Finals ==
=== Final 1-6 ===
Rank	Name	Country
	Jennie Reed	United States
	Victoria Pendleton	Great Britain
	Christin Muche	Germany
4	Clara Sanchez	France
5	Anna Blyth	Great Britain
6	Simona Krupeckaitė	Lithuania

=== Final 7-12 ===
Rank	Name	Country
7	Swetlana Grankowskaja	Russia
8	Diana García	Colombia
9	Willy Kanis	Netherlands
10	Lisandra Guerra	Cuba
11	Dana Glöss	Germany
12	Gong Jinjie	China

=== Final standings 13-20 ===
Rank	Name	Country
13	Jessica Varnish	Great Britain
13	Valentina Alessio	Italy
13	Oksana Grishina	Russia
16	Kaarle McCulloch	Australia
16	Sandie Clair	France
16	Elisa Frisoni	Italy
19	Tsudkuda Sakie	Japan
