= Cycling at the 2008 Summer Olympics – Women's sprint =

Women's sprint events at the Olympics

Women's Sprint at the Games of the XXIX Olympiad
- Olympic Track cycling
- Venue: Laoshan Velodrome
- Dates: August 17 (preliminaries—1st round); August 18 (quarterfinals—final)
- Competitors: 12 from 11 nations
- Winning time: 11.363/11.118

Medalists
1st place, gold medalist(s)		Victoria Pendleton	Great Britain
2nd place, silver medalist(s)		Anna Meares	Australia
3rd place, bronze medalist(s)		Guo Shuang	China

The women's sprint at the 2008 Summer Olympics took place on August 19 at the Laoshan Velodrome.

This track cycling event consisted of numerous rounds. The competition began with a time trial over 200 metres. The top 12 cyclists in that qualifying round were seeded into the 1/8 finals. There, they raced one-on-one. The six winners advanced to the quarterfinals, with the six losers getting another chance at the repechage. This repechage consisted of three-cyclist heats, with the two winners moving on to the quarterfinals.

Beginning with the quarterfinals, the head-to-head competitions switched to a best-of-three format. That format was also used for the semifinals and final. In addition, the bronze medal competition was a best-of-three match between the semifinal losers. The classification race for 5th to 8th places was a single race with all four cyclists competing.

== Preliminaries ==
200 metre time trial. All twelve cyclists advanced to the first round; the preliminary was purely for seeding.

Rank	Rider	Time	Average Speed (km/h)
1	Victoria Pendleton (GBR)	10.963 OR	65.675
2	Guo Shuang (CHN)	11.106	64.829
3	Anna Meares (AUS)	11.140	64.631
4	Willy Kanis (NED)	11.167	64.475
5	Simona Krupeckaitė (LTU)	11.222	64.159
6	Clara Sanchez (FRA)	11.365	63.352
7	Natallia Tsylinskaya (BLR)	11.372	63.313
8	Jennie Reed (USA)	11.400	63.157
9	Lisandra Guerra (CUB)	11.462	62.816
10	Yvonne Hijgenaar (NED)	11.533	62.429
11	Svetlana Grankovskaya (RUS)	11.544	62.370
12	Sakie Tsukuda (JPN)	12.134	59.337

== First round ==
The twelve cyclists were paired based on their preliminary round rankings, 1 vs. 12, 2 vs. 11, and so on, in head-to-head 200 metre matches, with the winners advancing to the second round and the losers to the repechage.

Match 1

Name	Time	Average speed (km/h)
Victoria Pendleton (GBR)	11.736	61.349
Sakie Tsukuda (JPN)		

Match 2

Name	Time	Average speed (km/h)
Guo Shuang (CHN)	11.410	63.102
Svetlana Grankovskaya (RUS)		

Match 3

Name	Time	Average speed (km/h)
Anna Meares (AUS)	11.663	61.733
Yvonne Hijgenaar (NED)		

Match 4

Name	Time	Average speed (km/h)
Willy Kanis (NED)	12.155	59.234
Lisandra Guerra (CUB)	REL	

Match 5

Name	Time	Average speed (km/h)
Jennie Reed (USA)	11.955	60.225
Simona Krupeckaitė (LTU)		

Match 6

Name	Time	Average speed (km/h)
Clara Sanchez (FRA)	11.607	62.031
Natallia Tsylinskaya (BLR)		

=== Repechage ===
The sixlosers from the first round were put into two three-rider 200 metre matches, with the winner of each advancing to the next round.

Match 1

Name	Time	Average speed (km/h)
Natallia Tsylinskaya (BLR)	11.871	60.652
Lisandra Guerra (CUB)		
Sakie Tsukuda (JPN)		

Match 2

Name	Time	Average speed (km/h)
Simona Krupeckaitė (LTU)	12.123	59.391
Svetlana Grankovskaya (RUS)		
Yvonne Hijgenaar (NED)		

== Quarterfinals ==
The eight cyclists qualified this far were paired for a best two-out-of-three series of 200 metre races. None of the pairings required a third race.

Match 1

Name	Time (Race 1)	Time (Race 2)
Victoria Pendleton (GBR)	11.389	11.672
Simona Krupeckaitė (LTU)		

Match 2

Name	Time (Race 1)	Time (Race 2)
Guo Shuang (CHN)	11.501	11.627
Natallia Tsylinskaya (BLR)		

Match 3

Name	Time (Race 1)	Time (Race 2)
Anna Meares (AUS)	11.716	12.108
Clara Sanchez (FRA)		

Match 4

Name	Time (Race 1)	Time (Race 2)
Willy Kanis (NED)	11.944	11.767
Jennie Reed (USA)		

== Semifinals ==
The four cyclists qualified this far were paired again for a best two-out-of-three series of 200 metre races. Guo Shuang was relegated for having deemed to have illegally manoeuvred Anna Meares, after having jostled her in their third and decisive sprint.

Match 1

Name	Time (Race 1)	Time (Race 2)
Victoria Pendleton (GBR)	11.537	11.885
Willy Kanis (NED)		

Match 2

Name	Time (Race 1)	Time (Race 2)	Time (Race 3)
Anna Meares (AUS)		11.578	11.617
Guo Shuang (CHN)	11.629		REL

=== 9th—12th place classification race ===
During the same session as the semifinals, the four cyclists who were eliminated in the repechage were put into a single four-rider 200 metre race to determine exact placings from ninth to twelfth.

Classification race

Name	Time	Average speed (km/h)	Rank
Svetlana Grankovskaya (RUS)	12.192	59.055	9
Lisandra Guerra (CUB)			10
Yvonne Hijgenaar (NED)			11
Sakie Tsukuda (JPN)			12

== Finals ==
=== 5th—8th place classification race ===
In the same session as the finals, the four cyclists who lost in the quarterfinals were put into one four-rider 200 metre race to determine exact placings from fifth to eighth.

Classification race

Name	Time	Average speed (km/h)	Rank
Clara Sanchez (FRA)	12.264	58.708	5
Natallia Tsylinskaya (BLR)			6
Jennie Reed (USA)			7
Simona Krupeckaitė (LTU)	REL		8

The winners from the semifinals were paired to race for gold and silver, and the losers from that round raced for bronze. Each match was again the best two-out-of-three 200 metre races.

Bronze medal match

Name	Time (Race 1)	Time (Race 2)	Rank
Guo Shuang (CHN)	11.420	11.617	3
Willy Kanis (NED)			4

Gold medal match

Name	Time (Race 1)	Time (Race 2)	Rank
Victoria Pendleton (GBR)	11.363	11.118	1
Anna Meares (AUS)			2
