= 2007 UCI Track Cycling World Championships – Women's team sprint =

Women's team sprint at the 2007 UCI Track Cycling World Championships
- Venue: Palma Arena
- Location: Palma de Mallorca, Spain
- Date: 29 March 2007
- Winning time: 33.631

Medalists
gold medal	Victoria Pendleton; Shanaze Reade	Great Britain
silver medal	Yvonne Hijgenaar; Willy Kanis	Netherlands
bronze medal	Kristine Bayley; Anna Meares	Australia

The Women's Team Sprint is one of the 7 women's events at the 2007 UCI Track World Championship, held in Palma de Mallorca, Spain.

Eleven teams of two cyclists each participated in the contest. After the qualifying, the fastest two teams raced for gold, and 3rd and 4th teams raced for bronze.

The Qualifying and the Finals were held on the evening session on March 29.

== Qualifying ==
Rank	Team	Lap 1	Time	Speed (km/h)	Q
Rank	Team	Lap 1	Lap 1–2	Speed (km/h)	Q
1	Great Britain	19.305 (1)	33,630	53,523	QF
	Victoria Pendleton; Shanaze Reade		14.325 (1)		
2	Netherlands	19.348 (2)	34,071	52,830	QF
	Yvonne Hijgenaar; Willy Kanis		14.723 (4)		
3	Australia	19.682 (6)	34,155	52,700	QB
	Kristine Bayley; Anna Meares		14.463 (2)		
4	France	19.583 (3)	34,314	52,456	QB
	Sandie Clair; Virginie Cueff		14.731 (5)		
5	Germany	19.691 (5)	34,578	52,056	
	Jane Gerisch; Christin Muche		14.887 (6)		
6	China	19.663 (4)	34,676	51,909	
	Tian Fang; Gong Jinjie		15.013 (7)		
7	New Zealand	19.782 (7)	34,799	51,725	
	Fiona Carswell; Jocelyn Rastrick		15.017 (8)		
8	Russia	20.172 (8)	34,862	51,632	
	Swetlana Grankowskaja; Oksana Grishina		14.690 (3)		
9	Poland	20.734 (10)	36,159	49,780	
	Renata Dąbrowska; Magdalena Sara		15.425 (9)		
10	Spain	20.656 (9)	36,354	49,513	
	Leire Olaberria Dorronsoro; Ainhoa Pagola Alvarez		15.698 (10)		
11	Czech Republic	21.514 (11)	37,348	48,195	
	Lada Kozlíková; Lenka Valova		15.834 (11)		

== Finals ==
Rank	Team	Lap 1	Time	Speed (km/h)
Rank	Team	Lap 1	Lap 1–2	Speed (km/h)
Gold Medal Race
	Great Britain	19.269 (2)	33,631	53,522
	Victoria Pendleton; Shanaze Reade		14.362 (1)	
	Netherlands	19.267 (1)	33,974	52,981
	Yvonne Hijgenaar; Willy Kanis		14.707 (2)	
Bronze Medal Race
	Australia	19.287 (1)	33,810	53,238
	Kristine Bayley; Anna Meares		14.523 (1)	
4	France	19.700 (2)	34,644	51,957
	Sandie Clair; Virginie Cueff		14.944 (2)	
