= Sakie Tsukuda =

Japanese cyclist

Personal information
- Full name: Sakie Tsukuda
- Born: 31 October 1985 (age 40) Bihoro, Hokkaidō, Japan
- Height: 1.68 m (5 ft 6 in)
- Weight: 68 kg (150 lb)

Cycling career
- Sport: Cycling
- Discipline: Track
- Role: Rider
- Rider type: Sprinter
Medal record
Women's track cycling
Representing Japan
Asian Championships
Silver medal – second place	2006 Kuala Lumpur	Keirin

Sakie Tsukuda (佃 咲江, Tsukuda Sakie; born October 31, 1985 in Bihoro, Hokkaidō) is a Japanese track cyclist. She mounted a spirited challenge over South Africa's Tracey van Niekerk for the women's sprint gold medal at the 2007 UCI B World Championships in Cape Town, and later represented Japan at the 2008 Summer Olympics.

Tsukuda qualified for her first Japanese squad, as a 22-year-old, in the women's sprint at the 2008 Summer Olympics in Beijing by receiving a berth from the UCI "B" World Championships in Cape Town, South Africa. After grabbing the twelfth and final seed in 12.134 (an average speed of 59.337 km/h) on the morning prelims, Tsukuda lost her first round match-up to Great Britain's top medal favorite Victoria Pendleton in a spectacular fashion, finished third in her repechage heat behind Belarus' Natallia Tsylinskaya and Cuba's Lisandra Guerra, and then placed twelfth overall in a single four-rider 200 m race to round out the field.

== Career highlights ==
2006

- 6th Asian Games (Sprint), Doha (QAT)

2007

- (gold) UCI B World Championships (Keirin), Cape Town (RSA)
- (gold) UCI B World Championships (Sprint), Cape Town (RSA)

2008

- 12th Olympic Games (Sprint), Beijing (CHN)
- 27th UCI World Championships (Sprint), Manchester (GBR)

2013

- (gold) Japanese Track Cycling Championships (Pursuit), Japan
