= Anna Meares Bike Path =

Bike path in Adelaide, Australia

- Location: Adelaide, Australia
- Established: 28 November 2012

The Anna Meares Bike Path is a bike path in Adelaide, Australia, which is adjacent to Sir Donald Bradman Drive, near Adelaide Airport. It was named after track cyclist Anna Meares and opened by Meares on 28 November 2012. The western end of the bike path is the intersection of Sir Donald Bradman Drive and Tapleys Hill Road opposite the Reece Jennings Bikeway. It extends east to Frank Collopy Court, and is intended to eventually extend east and south around the airport precinct to Watson Avenue in Netley to connect with the Captain McKenna Pathway. Ultimately, there is intended to be a 17 kilometres (11 mi) loop around Adelaide Airport. The costs for the bike path was $900,000 with the eventual extension being worth up to $1.5 million.
