= Parnitha Olympic Mountain Bike Venue =

Mountain biking venue in Greece

The Parnitha Olympic Mountain Bike Venue was the site of the mountain biking events at the 2004 Summer Olympics at Athens, Greece. The venue is located at Parnitha, a mountain located in Acharnai, Athens.
