= Kristine Perkins =

Australian cyclist (born 1983)

Kristine Bayley
Personal information
- Full name: Kristine Bayley
- Born: 22 June 1983 (age 43) Australia

Cycling career
- Sport: Cycling
- Discipline: Track
- Role: Rider
- Rider type: Sprint
Medal record
Representing Australia
Women's track cycling
World Championships
Bronze medal – third place	2007 Palma de Mallorca	Team sprint
Bronze medal – third place	2025 Santiago	Team sprint

Kristine Bayley (born 22 June 1983 in Perth) is an Australian professional track cyclist.

Her brother, Ryan Bayley, is also a professional cyclist.

Her engagement to Shane Perkins, another international track cyclist, was announced in spring 2008. They were married in November 2009.

== Palmarès ==
2004
3rd Team Sprint, World Cup, Manchester
2005
Australian National Track Championships

3rd 500 m
2nd Keirin

2006
Australian National Track Championships

1st 500 m, Elite
3rd Team Sprint

Oceania Games

1st 500 m
2nd Sprint
3rd Keirin

2007
Australian National Track Championships

2nd 500 m
3rd Team Sprint
3rd Sprint
3rd Keirin

3rd Team Sprint, World Cup, Manchester
3rd Team Sprint, World Championships (with Anna Meares)
