= Cycling at the 2004 Summer Olympics =

Cycling at the Games of the XXVIII Olympiad
- Venue: Olympic Velodrome (track); Parnitha Mountain Bike Venue (mountain); Athens and surrounding area (road)
- Dates: 14 – 24 August 2004
- No. of events: 18
- Competitors: 464 from 61 nations

Cycling at the 2004 Summer Olympics consisted of 18 events in three disciplines:

- Road cycling, held at the Athens historic centre (start and finish at Kotzia Square, for the road race events) and in Vouliagmeni Olympic Centre (for the time trial events).
- Track cycling, held at the Olympic Velodrome.
- Mountain biking, held at the Parnitha Olympic Mountain Bike Venue.

In total, 464 cyclists participated: these consisted of 334 men and 130 women, from 61 countries. The youngest participant was Ignatas Konovalovas, at 18 years, while the oldest was Jeannie Longo, at 45 years. The most successful contestant was Bradley Wiggins, who won three medals: one gold, one silver and one bronze. The most successful country was Australia, with its team members winning 6 gold and 11 total medals. Russia and Great Britain came in second place with 3 and 2 golds, respectively. After a disqualification, Viatcheslav Ekimov of Russia was awarded his second gold medal in men's time trial, defending his title from 2000, and his third gold medal overall. He achieved his first victory back in 1988, when he competed in men's track pursuit as part of the Soviet team.

The Olympic Velodrome in Athens, where track cycling events were held during the 2004 Summer Olympics.

Australia dominated track events, winning 5 out of its 6 cycling gold medals there.

== Road cycling ==
Games	Gold	Silver	Bronze
Men's road race	Paolo Bettini; Italy	Sérgio Paulinho; Portugal	Axel Merckx; Belgium
Men's time trial	Viatcheslav Ekimov; Russia	Bobby Julich; United States	Michael Rogers; Australia
Women's road race	Sara Carrigan; Australia	Judith Arndt; Germany	Olga Slyusareva; Russia
Women's time trial	Leontien van Moorsel; Netherlands	Deirdre Demet-Barry; United States	Karin Thürig; Switzerland

== Track cycling ==
=== Men's ===
Games	Gold	Silver	Bronze
Keirin	Ryan Bayley; Australia	José Antonio Escuredo; Spain	Shane Kelly; Australia
Madison	Australia; Graeme Brown; Stuart O'Grady	Switzerland; Franco Marvulli; Bruno Risi	Great Britain; Rob Hayles; Bradley Wiggins
points race	Mikhail Ignatiev; Russia	Joan Llaneras; Spain	Guido Fulst; Germany
individual pursuit	Bradley Wiggins; Great Britain	Brad McGee; Australia	Sergi Escobar; Spain
team pursuit	Australia; Graeme Brown; Brett Lancaster; Brad McGee; Luke Roberts	Great Britain; Steve Cummings; Rob Hayles; Paul Manning; Bradley Wiggins	Spain; Carlos Castaño; Sergi Escobar; Asier Maeztu; Carlos Torrent
individual sprint	Ryan Bayley; Australia	Theo Bos; Netherlands	René Wolff; Germany
team sprint	Germany; Jens Fiedler; Stefan Nimke; René Wolff	Japan; Toshiaki Fushimi; Masaki Inoue; Tomohiro Nagatsuka	France; Mickaël Bourgain; Laurent Gané; Arnaud Tournant
time trial	Chris Hoy; Great Britain	Arnaud Tournant; France	Stefan Nimke; Germany

=== Women's ===
Games	Gold	Silver	Bronze
points race	Olga Slyusareva; Russia	Belem Guerrero Méndez; Mexico	María Luisa Calle; Colombia
pursuit	Sarah Ulmer; New Zealand	Katie Mactier; Australia	Leontien van Moorsel; Netherlands
sprint	Lori-Ann Muenzer; Canada	Tamilla Abassova; Russia	Anna Meares; Australia
time trial	Anna Meares; Australia	Jiang Yonghua; China	Natallia Tsylinskaya; Belarus

== Mountain biking ==
Games	Gold	Silver	Bronze
Men's	Julien Absalon; France	José Antonio Hermida; Spain	Bart Brentjens; Netherlands
Women's	Gunn-Rita Dahle Flesjå; Norway	Marie-Hélène Prémont; Canada	Sabine Spitz; Germany

== Medal table ==
Rank	Nation	Gold	Silver	Bronze	Total
1	Australia	6	2	3	11
2	Russia	3	1	1	5
3	Great Britain	2	1	1	4
4	Germany	1	1	4	6
5	Netherlands	1	1	2	4
6	France	1	1	1	3
7	Canada	1	1	0	2
8	Italy	1	0	0	1
8	New Zealand	1	0	0	1
8	Norway	1	0	0	1
11	Spain	0	3	2	5
12	United States	0	2	0	2
13	Switzerland	0	1	1	2
14	China	0	1	0	1
14	Japan	0	1	0	1
14	Mexico	0	1	0	1
14	Portugal	0	1	0	1
18	Belarus	0	0	1	1
18	Belgium	0	0	1	1
18	Colombia	0	0	1	1
Totals (20 entries)		18	18	18	54

== World records broken ==
- Women's 500 m time trial: Australia's Anna Meares, 33.952 s (20 August). The previous record of 34.000 s was set in August 2002 by Yonghua Jiang.
- Women's individual pursuit: New Zealand's Sarah Ulmer, 3:24.537 (22 August). This record was broken multiple times during these Games, the prior instances being New Zealand's Sarah Ulmer, 3:26.400 (21 August); Australia's Katie Mactier, 3:29.945 (21 August). The previous record of 3:30.604 was set in May by Ulmer.
- Men's team pursuit: Australia's Graeme Brown, Brett Lancaster, Bradley McGee, Luke Roberts, 3:56.610 (22 August). The previous record of 3:59:583 was set in 2002 by Australian team.
