= Azucena Sánchez =

Spanish cyclist and performance specialist (born 1978)

Personal information
- Full name: Azucena Sánchez Benito
- Born: 15 October 1978 (age 48) Spain
- Height: 174 cm (5 ft 9 in)
- Weight: 62 kg (137 lb)

Cycling career
- Sport: Cycling
- Discipline: Road cycling
- Role: Rider

Professional teams
- 2003: Team Catalunya - Aliverti - Kookai
- 2004: Team Aliverti - Bianchi - Kookai
- 2008: Team CMAX Dila
- 2010–2011: Reyno de Navarra-Telco-Conor
- 2012: S.C. Michela Fanini-Rox

Azucena Sánchez Benito (born 15 October 1978) is a Spanish former road cyclist.

== Cycling career ==
Azucena Sánchez Benito competed for UCI women's teams including Team Catalunya - Aliverti - Kookai, Team Aliverti - Bianchi - Kookai, Team CMAX Dila, Reyno de Navarra-Telco-Conor and S.C. Michela Fanini-Rox. She rode the 2012 UCI Road World Championships – Women's team time trial with S.C. Michela Fanini-Rox.

== Media and collaborations ==
Azucena Sánchez Benito has been involved in endurance and performance environments, including projects related to the Titan Desert and collaborations linked to GAES and endurance athletes.

== Professional activity ==
After retiring from cycling, Azucena Sánchez Benito developed a professional practice focused on psychophysical preparation, physiotherapy and performance training.

She is listed in the Swiss EMR/RME register as a certified therapist. She is also presented on OneDoc as a neuro physical-musical-sports trainer and neuro-physiotherapist working in Massagno, Switzerland.

She collaborates with the Conservatorio della Svizzera italiana in activities related to musicians' health and psychophysical preparation for musical performance.
