= Ma Shanshan =

Chinese cyclist

Personal information
- Born: 25 September 1986 (age 40)

Cycling career
- Sport: Cycling
- Discipline: Track cycling
- Role: Rider
- Rider type: team pursuit

Ma Shanshan (born 25 September 1986) is a Chinese female track cyclist. She competed in the team pursuit event at the 2014 UCI Track Cycling World Championships.
