= 2005 UCI Track Cycling World Championships =

Cycling world championships

- Venue: Los Angeles, United States
- Date: March 24–March 27, 2005
- Velodrome: ADT Event Center
- Events: 15

The 2005 UCI Track Cycling World Championships were the World Championship for track cycling. They took place in Los Angeles, United States from March 24 to March 27, 2005.

== Medal table ==
Rank	Nation	Gold	Silver	Bronze	Total
1	Great Britain (GBR)	4	1	1	6
2	Netherlands (NED)	2	3	3	8
3	Germany (GER)	2	0	1	3
4	Australia (AUS)	1	3	5	9
5	Russia (RUS)	1	2	0	3
6	France (FRA)	1	1	0	2
6	Italy (ITA)	1	1	0	2
8	Ukraine (UKR)	1	0	1	2
9	Belarus (BLR)	1	0	0	1
9	Denmark (DEN)	1	0	0	1
11	Spain (ESP)	0	1	1	2
12	Barbados (BAR)	0	1	0	1
12	Greece (GRE)	0	1	0	1
12	New Zealand (NZL)	0	1	0	1
15	Belgium (BEL)	0	0	2	2
16	Switzerland (SUI)	0	0	1	1
Totals (16 entries)		15	15	15	45

== Medal summary ==
Event	Gold		Silver		Bronze	
Men's Events
Men's sprint	René Wolff; Germany		Mickaël Bourgain; France		Jobie Dajka; Australia	
Men's 1 km time trial	Theo Bos; Netherlands	1:01.165	Jason Queally; Great Britain	1:01.230	Chris Hoy; Great Britain	1:02.262
Men's individual pursuit	Robert Bartko; Germany		Sergi Escobar Roure; Spain		Levi Heimans; Netherlands	
Men's team pursuit	Steve Cummings; Chris Newton; Paul Manning; Rob Hayles; Great Britain		Levi Heimans; Jens Mouris; Peter Schep; Niki Terpstra; Netherlands		Ashley Hutchinson; Matthew Goss; Mark Jamieson; Stephen Wooldridge; Australia	
Men's team sprint	Jason Queally; Chris Hoy; Jamie Staff; Great Britain		Theo Bos; Teun Mulder; Tim Veldt; Netherlands		Matthias John; Stefan Nimke; René Wolff; Germany	
Men's keirin	Teun Mulder; Netherlands		Barry Forde; Barbados		Shane Kelly; Australia	
Men's scratch	Alex Rasmussen; Denmark		Greg Henderson; New Zealand		Matthew Gilmore; Belgium	
Men's points race	Volodymyr Rybin; Ukraine	38	Ioannis Tamouridis; Greece	36	Joan Llaneras; Spain	34
Men's madison	Mark Cavendish; Robert Hayles; Great Britain	0	Robert Slippens; Danny Stam; Netherlands	22 (-1 lap)	Matthew Gilmore; Iljo Keisse; Belgium	20 (-1 lap)
Women's Events
Women's sprint	Victoria Pendleton; Great Britain		Tamilla Abassova; Russia		Anna Meares; Australia	
Women's 500 m time trial	Natalia Tsylinskaya; Belarus	34.738	Anna Meares; Australia	34.752	Yvonne Hijgenaar; Netherlands	34.928
Women's individual pursuit	Katie Mactier; Australia		Katherine Bates; Australia		Karin Thürig; Switzerland	
Women's keirin	Clara Sanchez; France		Elisa Frisoni; Italy		Yvonne Hijgenaar; Netherlands	
Women's scratch	Olga Sliusareva; Russia		Katherine Bates; Australia		Liudmila Vipirailo; Ukraine	
Women's points race	Vera Carrara; Italy	31	Olga Sliusareva; Russia	29	Katherine Bates; Australia	21
