= Jiang Yonghua =

Chinese cyclist (born 1973)

Personal information
- Full name: Jiang Yonghua
- Born: September 7, 1973 (age 53) Jixi, China
- Height: 1.67 m (5 ft 6 in)
- Weight: 68 kg (150 lb; 10.7 st)

Cycling career
- Sport: Cycling
- Discipline: Track
- Role: Rider
- Rider type: Sprint
Medal record
Representing China
Women's track cycling
Olympic Games
Silver medal – second place	2004 Athens	500 m time trial
UCI Track Cycling World Championships
Silver medal – second place	2004 Melbourne	500 m Time Trial

Jiang Yonghua (simplified Chinese: 江永华; traditional Chinese: 江永華; pinyin: Jiāng Yǒnghuá; born September 7, 1973, in Jixi, Heilongjiang) is a female Chinese track cyclist. She is a former world record holder for the Women's 500 m Time Trial, which was set on August 11, 2002, in Kunming with a time of 34.000 seconds. On 20 August 2004, she also broke the Olympic record at the 2004 Summer Olympics in Athens, setting a time of 34.112 seconds, but was beaten by Australia's Anna Meares a few minutes later, with new Olympic and world record time of 33.952 seconds.

Yonghua began cycling career with the Heilongjiang Provincial Sports Team C in October 1989. She became a member of the Beijing team in December 1999.

== Palmarès ==
2001
1st (China) 500 m Time Trial, Chinese National Championships

2002
1st 500 m Time Trial, round of UCI Track Cycling World Cup Classics
1st 500 m Time Trial, Asian Games

2003
1st (China) 500 m Time Trial, Chinese National Championships
5th 500 m Time Trial, 2003 UCI Track Cycling World Championships

2004
2nd 500 m Time Trial, 2004 UCI Track Cycling World Championships
2nd 500 m Time Trial, 2004 Summer Olympics
