= Christin Muche =

German track cyclist (born 1983)

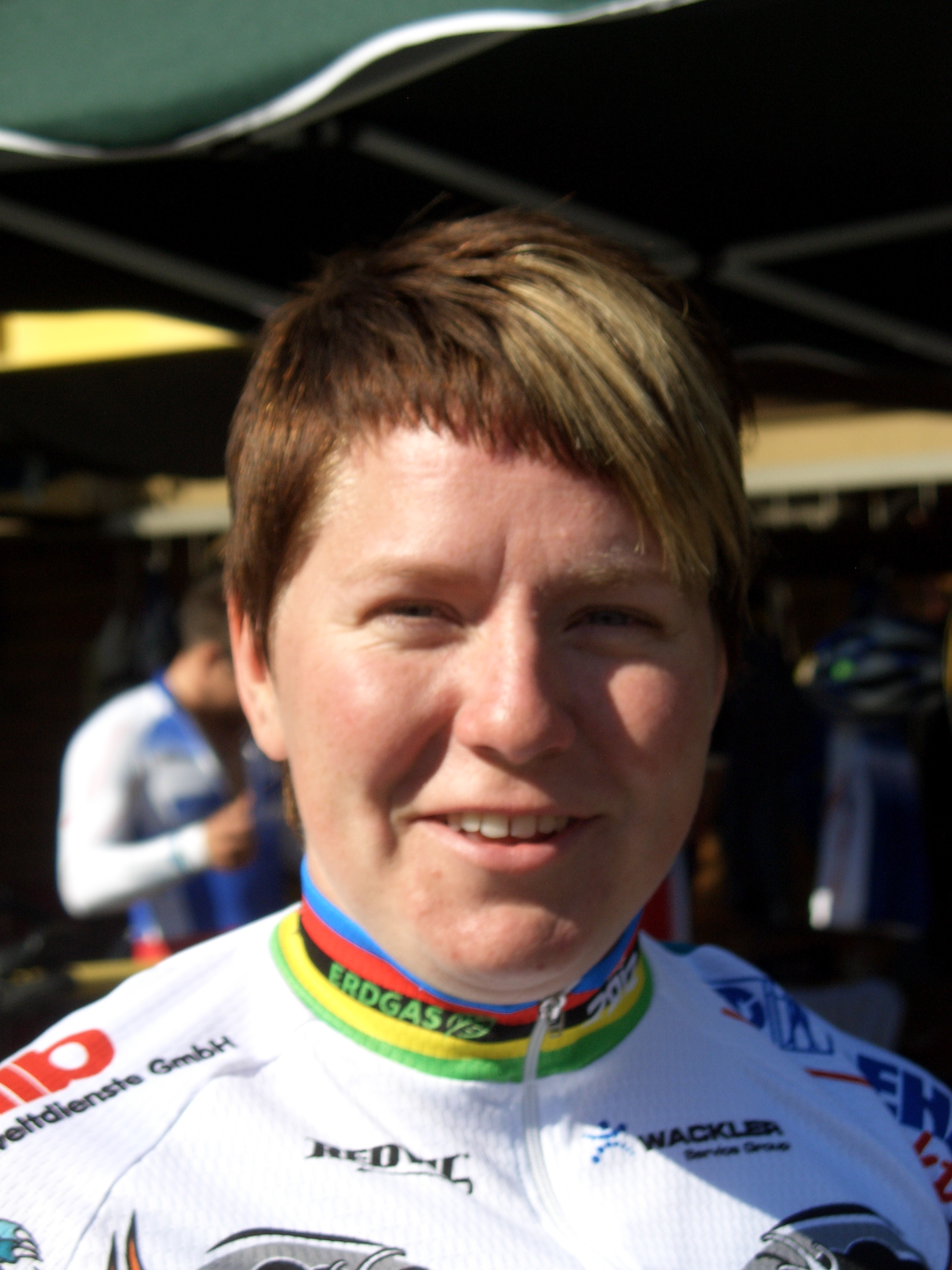
- A picture of Christin Muche the cyclist.

Personal information
- Born: 19 October 1983 (age 42)

Cycling career
- Sport: Cycling
- Discipline: Track cycling
- Role: Rider
- Rider type: sprinter
Medal record
Representing Germany
Women's track cycling
UCI World Championships
Bronze medal – third place	2008 Manchester	Keirin

Christin Muche (born 19 October 1983) is a German female track cyclist, and part of the national team. She competed at the 2005, 2007, 2008 and 2010 UCI Track Cycling World Championships. She won the bronze medal in the keirin event at the 2008 UCI Track Cycling World Championships.
