= Natallia Tsylinskaya =

Belarusian cyclist (born 1975)

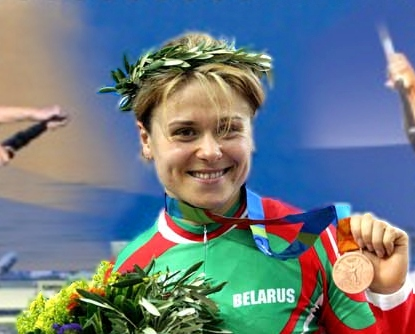
- Natallia Tsylinskaya on a 2004 Belarusian stamp

Personal information
- Full name: Natallia Tsylinskaya
- Born: 30 April 1975 (age 51) Minsk, Belarus
- Height: 1.73 m (5 ft 8 in)
- Weight: 73 kg (161 lb; 11.5 st)

Cycling career
- Sport: Cycling
- Disciplines: Track & Road
- Role: Rider

Professional team
- 2007–: Safi – Pasta Zara – Manhattan
Medal record
Representing Belarus
Women's track cycling
Olympic Games
Bronze medal – third place	2004 Athens	500 m Time Trial
World Championships
Gold medal – first place	2000 Manchester	Sprint
Gold medal – first place	2000 Manchester	500 Time Trial
Gold medal – first place	2002 Copenhagen	Sprint
Gold medal – first place	2002 Copenhagen	500 Time Trial
Gold medal – first place	2003 Stuttgart	500 Time Trial
Gold medal – first place	2005 Los Angeles	500 Time Trial
Gold medal – first place	2006 Bordeaux	Sprint
Gold medal – first place	2006 Bordeaux	500 Time Trial
Silver medal – second place	2003 Stuttgart	Sprint

Natallia Tsylinskaya (Russian: Наталья Цилинская; born 30 August 1975) is a former international cyclist who specialised in track sprinting. Tsylinskaya is an eight-time World Champion and an Olympic bronze medalist. She now serves as the chairwoman of the Belarusian Cycling Federation and a state coach for the National Olympic Training Center for cycling.

== Early life ==
Tsylinskaya was born in Minsk, then part of the Soviet Union. Under the direction of her trainer, Alexander Beljatsky (who rode for Russia's road racing team Dynamo), Tsylinskaya won the Youth USSR Championship at the age of 14. At 16, in 1993, she travelled to Perth, Australia, to participate in the Junior World Championships, where she won a bronze medal.

== Return to cycling ==
Tsylinskaya stepped away from professional cycling to start her family, but Belarusian authorities convinced Natallia to return to competitive cycling during the winter of 1998. As Minsk did not have a track or adequate training facilities, Tsylinskaya moved to Moscow, where she trained.

At the 2000 World Championships in Manchester, England, she won gold in both the 500mTT (time trial) and the Sprint, but these results alone were insufficient to qualify for the 2000 Summer Olympics in Sydney. In 2001, she teamed up with Russian trainer, Stanislav Solovyev (Станислав Соловьев), who remained her coach throughout her career. She won gold for both the sprint and 500mTT events at three of the four world cups in that year but did not gain a medal at the 2001 World Championships in Antwerp, Belgium. She also suffered a severe crash during the sprint qualification rounds, in which she broke her collarbone.

== Championships from 2002 to 2004 ==
Riding for the first time in international competition under her maiden name of Tsylinskaya, she began the 2002 season by winning both the sprint and 500mTT events at the World Cup races in Monterrey and Moscow. She followed this by winning gold in both the 500mTT and sprint events at the 2002 World Championships in Ballerup, Denmark.

At the 2003 World Championships in Stuttgart, Germany, she won gold in the 500mTT event, posting her personal best time of 34.078 seconds. However, in the sprint event, Tsylinskaya competed against Russian track cyclist Svetlana Grankovskaya in the final, and lost in two straight heats, taking second place.

In 2004, the focus was on the Athens Olympics that took place in August. After victories in World Cup races earlier that year, at the World Championships in Melbourne, Australia, in May 2004, she collided with British rider Victoria Pendleton's wheel in the sprint and bruised her right hip in the crash. In the following 500mTT competition, she finished eighth, with Anna Meares winning the event. On 20 August 2004, Tsylinskaya took the bronze medal, her only Olympic medal, in the 500m time trial, with a time of 34.167 seconds.

== Season 2005 – season 2006 ==
At beginning of the new season, Tsylinskaya expanded her training routine to incorporate Keirin racing. She began the season by appearing at the Los Angeles World Cup, winning gold in the 500mTT and the sprint and winning bronze in the Keirin (losing to Victoria Pendleton and Anna Meares). One month later, in January 2005, Natallia rode at the Manchester World Cup, where she won gold in the Keirin event. The World Championships were held in Los Angeles. She won gold in the 500mTT race over Anna Meares by .014 seconds but was beaten in the sprint by Kerrie Meares, after being relegated and subsequently disqualified in the quarterfinals for performing a dangerous manoeuvre. In the second round of the Keirin event, Tsylinskaya fell whilst trying to gain the lead. Tsylinskaya sustained mild, superficial injuries as well as a moderate concussion.

The 2005-2006 World Cup season began in Moscow where Tsylinskaya won gold in both the 500mTT event and the sprint. At the Manchester World Cup, she earned gold in the 500mTT on the first day of the competition. A day later, she came second in the sprint, losing to Victoria Pendleton after being relegated in the final. In the Los Angeles World Cup, Tsylinskaya again won the 500mTT and the sprint events.

At the 2006 World Championships, Tsylinskaya won gold in the 500mTT event, posting a time of 34.152 seconds. At the later sprint event, Tsylinskaya also took the gold in the sprint event, beating Victoria Pendleton in the final.

== Season 2007 – season 2008 ==
The 2007 track cycling season commenced with Round 1 of the World Cup series in Sydney, Australia, from 17 to 19 November 2006. In the Sprint competition final, Tsylinskaya competed against the British champion, Victoria Pendleton, resulting in a closely contested third ride, with Tsylinskaya eventually securing the gold medal.

The second round of the World Cup series was held in Moscow, Russia, on 15–17 December. As in Sydney, Tsylinskaya made it through to the final, where she finished ahead of 19-year-old Cuban Lizandra Guerra. Tsylinskaya won second place behind Guerra with a time of 34.802 seconds in the 500m time trial. At the 2008 Summer Olympics in Beijing, she qualified seventh fastest in the preliminary heats for the sprint event. Tsylinskaya was placed sixth overall at the end of the competition.

== Union Européenne de Cyclisme ==
As of 2023, Tsylinskaya serves as part of the Management Board of the UEC, the European confederation of national cycling bodies. She also serves as the head of the women's commission of the UEC.

== Family life ==
Through cycling, Natallia met her first husband, Alexander Markovnichenko, a Ukrainian bicycle racer who, at the time, was a World Champion in the combined team of the USSR. They married in the mid-1990s, moved to Donbas, Ukraine, and Natallia gave birth to their daughter, in May 1996. She returned to Minsk occasionally to attend the Academy of Physical Training and Sports, where she studied in absentia and which she completed in 1998.

Tsylinskaya thereafter began a relationship with Russian bicycle racer Andrey Minashkin. The couple wed on 18 October 2002 in a ceremony in Minsk.
