= Kerrie Meares =

Australian cyclist

Personal information
- Full name: Kerrie Meares
- Born: 4 September 1982 (age 44) Blackwater, Australia
- Height: 1.69 m (5 ft 7 in)
- Weight: 69 kg (152 lb)

Cycling career
- Sport: Cycling
- Discipline: Track
- Role: Rider
- Rider type: Sprinter
Medal record
Representing Australia
Women's track cycling
Commonwealth Games
Gold medal – first place	2002 Manchester	Sprint
Gold medal – first place	2002 Manchester	500m TT
Bronze medal – third place	2006 Melbourne	Sprint
Bronze medal – third place	2006 Melbourne	500m TT
World Championship
Silver medal – second place	2002 Copenhagen	Sprint
Bronze medal – third place	2002 Copenhagen	500m TT

Kerrie Meares (born 4 September 1982 in Blackwater) is an Australian professional racing cyclist, and the older sister of Olympic Champion, Anna Meares. Kerrie and Anna watched the 1994 Commonwealth Games (that took place in Victoria, British Columbia, Canada) on television, where they saw Australian racing cyclist (Kathy Watt) compete, prompting them to try the sport.

In 2002 and after winning 2 x Commonwealth Games Gold Medals in Manchester, Meares was awarded the Queensland Sportswoman of the Year. Later that year, she was awarded the Peter Lacey award, an award bestowed on Queensland Academy of Sport athletes who have achieved great international success as well as being an ambassador for their sport. Meares went on to win further medals at the 2006 Commonwealth Games in both the 500m Time Trial and Match Sprint in Melbourne, but retired before a third consecutive games in Delhi, India.

As a Junior athlete, Meares was extremely successful breaking numerous State and National records in Sprint discipline events. She was a contender for the 2004 Olympic team, but pulled out from competition due to nagging back injuries, suffered during numerous crashes that occurred during competitions earlier that year.

Meares retired from professional track cycling in 2007 and married former compatriot and sportswoman Emily Rosemond. Post retirement from cycling, Kerrie and her wife Emily started the Track Cycling Academy based in Brisbane and online.

== Honours ==
- 2002 Australian Female Track Cyclist of the Year
- 2002 Queensland Sportswoman of the Year
- 2002 Peter Lacey Award
- 1999–2001 Multiplex Women's Sport Rising Star Scholarship Award
- 1997, 2000, 2001 Morning Bulletin / Frenchville Sports Club Junior Sports Star of the Year
- 2000 Australian Junior Women's Track Cyclist of the Year
- 1998 Coca-Cola Junior Sports Star of the Year

== Career highlights ==
1999
2nd 500m TT, World Track Championships – Junior
3rd Scratch Race, Oceania Games, Sydney
2000
1st 500m TT, World Track Championships – Junior
2002
3rd 500m TT, World Track Championships, Copenhagen
2nd Sprint, World Track Championships, Copenhagen
1st Team Sprint, Sydney
1st 500m TT, Commonwealth Games, Manchester
1st Sprint, Commonwealth Games, Manchester
2003
2nd Keirin, Sydney
2004
1st 500m TT, Oceania Games, Melbourne
1st Sprint, Oceania Games, Melbourne
1st Keirin, Oceania Games, Melbourne
2005
2nd 500m TT, Australian National Track Championships, Adelaide
2nd Sprint, Australian National Track Championships, Adelaide
3rd Keirin, Australian National Track Championships, Adelaide
3rd Sprint, Oceania Games, Wanganui
2nd 500m TT, Oceania Games, Wanganui
1st Keirin, Oceania Games, Wanganui
2006
2nd 500m TT, Australian National Track Championships, Adelaide
1st Team Sprint, Australian National Track Championships, Adelaide
2nd Sprint, Australian National Track Championships, Adelaide
1st Keirin, Australian National Track Championships, Adelaide
3rd 500m TT, Commonwealth Games, Melbourne
3rd Sprint, Commonwealth Games, Melbourne
1st Team Sprint, Sydney
2nd 500m TT, Oceania Games, Melbourne
1st Sprint, Oceania Games, Melbourne
1st Keirin, Oceania Games, Melbourne
2007
1st Team Sprint, Australian National Track Championships, Sydney
1st Sprint, Australian National Track Championships, Sydney
2nd Sprint, Oceania Cycling Championships, Invercargill
1st Team Sprint, Oceania Cycling Championships, Invercargill
2nd Team Sprint, Sydney
2008
3rd Team Sprint, Los Angeles
2009
1st Keirin, Australian National Track Championships, Adelaide

== Personal life ==
Kerrie Meares grew in the town of Gracemere, near Rockhampton. Kerrie and Olympic sister Anna Meares now have streets named after them.

Following retirement from cycling, via the Adelaide Advertiser Kerrie announced her marriage to Olympic speed-skater Emily Rosemond in 2015.
