= Anna Meares =

Australian cyclist (born 1983)

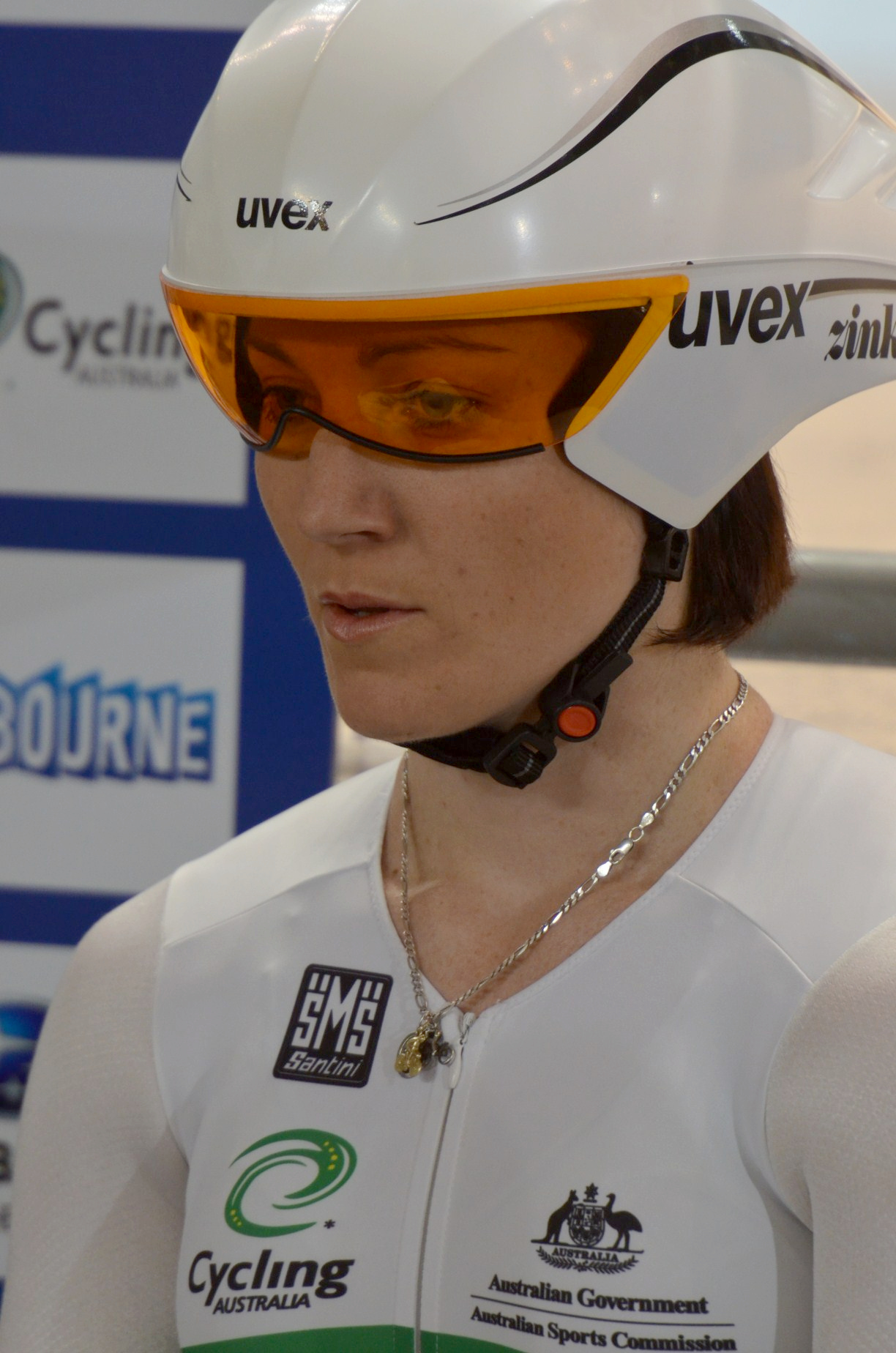
- Meares in 2012

Personal information
- Born: 21 September 1983 (age 43) Blackwater, Queensland, Australia
- Height: 165 cm (5 ft 5 in)
- Weight: 70 kg (154 lb)

Sport
- Sport: Track cycling
- Club: Rockhampton Cycling Club
- Coached by: Ken Tucker (1999–2003); Gary West
- Retired: 16 October 2016
Medal record
Event	1st	2nd	3rd
Olympic Games	2	1	3
World Championships	11	10	6
Commonwealth Games	5	2	1
Total	18	13	10
Representing Australia
Olympic Games
Gold medal – first place	2004 Athens	500 m time trial
Gold medal – first place	2012 London	Sprint
Silver medal – second place	2008 Beijing	Sprint
Bronze medal – third place	2004 Athens	Sprint
Bronze medal – third place	2012 London	Team sprint
Bronze medal – third place	2016 Rio de Janeiro	Keirin
World Championships
Gold medal – first place	2004 Melbourne	500 m time trial
Gold medal – first place	2007 Palma de Mallorca	500 m time trial
Gold medal – first place	2009 Pruszków	Team sprint
Gold medal – first place	2010 Ballerup	500 m time trial
Gold medal – first place	2010 Ballerup	Team sprint
Gold medal – first place	2011 Apeldoorn	Team sprint
Gold medal – first place	2011 Apeldoorn	Sprint
Gold medal – first place	2011 Apeldoorn	Keirin
Gold medal – first place	2012 Melbourne	Keirin
Gold medal – first place	2012 Melbourne	500 m time trial
Gold medal – first place	2015 Yvelines	Keirin
Silver medal – second place	2003 Stuttgart	Keirin
Silver medal – second place	2004 Melbourne	Sprint
Silver medal – second place	2005 Los Angeles	500 m time trial
Silver medal – second place	2006 Bordeaux	500 m time trial
Silver medal – second place	2009 Pruszków	500 m time trial
Silver medal – second place	2012 Melbourne	Team sprint
Silver medal – second place	2014 Cali	500 m time trial
Silver medal – second place	2014 Cali	Keirin
Silver medal – second place	2015 Yvelines	500 m time trial
Silver medal – second place	2016 London	Keirin
Bronze medal – third place	2005 Los Angeles	Sprint
Bronze medal – third place	2007 Palma de Mallorca	Sprint
Bronze medal – third place	2007 Palma de Mallorca	Team sprint
Bronze medal – third place	2007 Palma de Mallorca	Keirin
Bronze medal – third place	2012 Melbourne	Sprint
Bronze medal – third place	2015 Yvelines	Team sprint
Commonwealth Games
Gold medal – first place	2006 Melbourne	500 m time trial
Gold medal – first place	2010 Delhi	500 m time trial
Gold medal – first place	2010 Delhi	Sprint
Gold medal – first place	2010 Delhi	Team sprint
Gold medal – first place	2014 Glasgow	500 m time trial
Silver medal – second place	2006 Melbourne	Sprint
Silver medal – second place	2014 Glasgow	Sprint
Bronze medal – third place	2002 Manchester	Sprint

Anna Maree Devenish Meares OAM (born 21 September 1983) is an Australian retired track cyclist. As of early 2023, Meares and her family moved to New Zealand.

She has been the 500 metre track time trial world champion on four occasions, and a gold medallist at the Commonwealth and Olympic Games. At the 2015 UCI Track Cycling World Championships Meares took the gold in the keirin—her 11th world title in total, which made her the most decorated female track cyclist of all time.

She was the flag-bearer and captain for the Australian team at the 2016 Summer Olympics, where she won a bronze medal in keirin. This made her the first Australian to win individual medals in four consecutive Olympics.

On 16 October 2016, Meares announced her official retirement from her current competitive cycling career. In November 2022, she was appointed as the Chef de Mission of the Australian team for the 2024 Paris Olympic Games.

== Biography ==
Anna Meares started competitive cycling at the age of 11 in 1994, following her older sister Kerrie Meares into the sport. The family were inspired to take up competitive cycling by Kathy Watt winning a cycling gold medal at the 1994 Commonwealth Games. With the family living in the small Queensland coal-mining town of Middlemount, it was 2 hours and 45 minutes drive to the nearest cycling track at Mackay for the girls to train. She attended Rockhampton State High School from 1998 to 2000.

Over the course of her career, Meares has talked about how gradually she became aware of her position as a role model, portraying "a different stereotypical image of what it is to be a strong woman. It's not always about being skinny. It's about your presentation and your confidence and everyone is unique."

=== 2002 ===
In 2002 Meares narrowly missed a bronze medal in the inaugural inclusion of the 500-metre time trial at the 2002 Commonwealth Games in Manchester, while her older sister, Kerrie Meares won the gold medal in the event. She won a bronze medal in the sprint.

=== 2004 ===
During the 2004 Olympic Games in Athens, she won a gold medal, and set a new world record in the Women's 500-metre time trial of 33.952 seconds. Meares had to beat a new Olympic record set just minutes previously by the reigning World Record holder, Yonghua Jiang of China. (See Cycling at the 2004 Summer Olympics). The event was abolished from the Olympic program so Meares could not defend her title in 2008. Meares also won a bronze medal in the Women's 200m Sprint event in Athens.

In May 2004 at the Time Trial World Titles in Melbourne Meares claimed the title of Women's World time trial champion, and won a silver for the sprint event. Also claimed first in the 2004 World Cup Time Trial in Sydney.

=== 2005 ===
In 2005, Meares enrolled in a Bachelor of Learning Design course at Central Queensland University, but deferred her studies to concentrate on sport.

=== 2008 ===
Meares made an astonishing come back from a very bad cycling accident at the World Cup in January 2008 when she broke her neck. Meares crashed in the third round of the World Cup circuit in Los Angeles in January 2008, seven months out from the Olympics. Meares fractured her C2 vertebra, dislocated her right shoulder, suffered torn ligaments and tendons, a heavily bruised right hip and skin abrasions as a result of skin sliding on wood when she crashed at 65 km/h. Astonishingly she was back on the bike just 10 days after the fall and went through intensive rehabilitation. With the points Meares had secured prior to the crash, she was able to fight her way back and qualify for the 2008 Beijing Olympics.

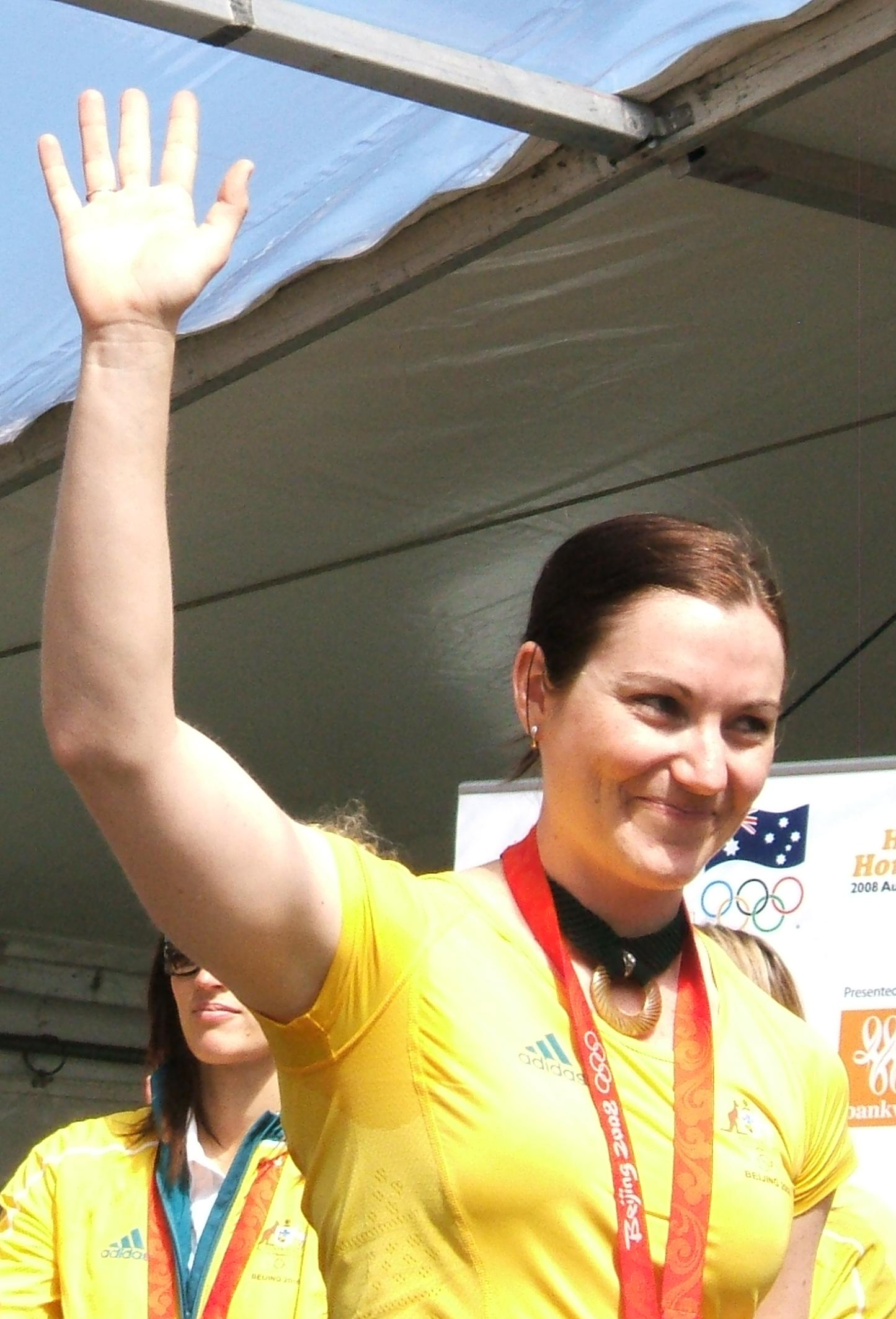
Meares at the 2008 Olympic homecoming parade in Adelaide

Meares had an eventful semi-final in the sprint at the 2008 Summer Olympics. Having lost the first heat to her opponent Guo Shuang, she won the second heat. The third heat saw Guo come down the banking too steeply and her front wheel slipped from beneath her. The heat was re-run and although Guo won by a few millimetres, she was relegated for coming down the track and pushing Meares onto the côte d'azure on the final lap. This put Meares through to the final ride-off for gold against Victoria Pendleton, where she was beaten and received the silver medal.

=== 2012 ===
At the 2012 World Championships which took place in Meares' home country of Australia in Melbourne, Meares was favourite for three gold medals. In the team sprint Meares won silver as Germany set two world records in the event. In qualification for the individual sprint Meares broke the world record for the flying start 200 metres. Meares completed her four laps in just 10.782 seconds shaving 11 thousands of a second off Simona Krupeckaitė's mark. In the semi-final Meares faced her old rival Pendleton. Pendleton clashed with the Australian in their first heat and ended up on the floor before Meares was relegated from the second for going outside of her lane. In the decider Pendleton won in a photo finish, with Meares settling for bronze after defeating Lyubov Shulika. In the keirin, Meares won both her qualifying races before reaching the final, where she held off Russian Ekaterina Gnidenko and German Kristina Vogel to win the first of two world championships in Melbourne. Meares set her second world record of the championships in her final event. Meares recorded 33.010 seconds to break the record by .286 of a second which was previously held by Simona Krupeckaitė. With the time Meares won her second title of the championships and equaled Felicia Ballanger's record of ten world titles.

In preparation for the Olympics, Meares and her coach, West, tailored a 'Project Know Thy Enemy' program. The 'Project' involved Meares racing against male sprinter: Alex Bird; who would mimic Pendleton: former "friend" turned "enemy". The objective was to run multiple racing scenarios and find the best tactic to beat "Queen Vic".

At the 2012 London Olympics, Meares qualified for the final of the sprint, where she again faced Victoria Pendleton. In the first sprint of the final, Pendleton crossed the line first, but was controversially relegated after illegally moving off her line as the cyclists sped through the final banking, which many believe was as a result of Meares aggressive riding. Meares won the second sprint to win 2–0 and take the gold medal. When asked about her tactics, perceived as being unsporting, she responded: "this is sport [...] We're not out there to have a cup of tea". She also won a bronze medal with Kaarle McCulloch in the team sprint.

=== 2013 ===
Meares took rest after the 2012 Olympics and skipped the 2013 World Championship. She returned to competitions in July 2013. Later that year she set a new world record of 32.836 seconds in the women's 500 m time trial at the UCI Mexico Track World Cup, making her the first woman to go under 33 seconds in the event.

=== 2015–16 ===
In late February 2015, Meares competed at the world championships and won three medals. She also separated from her husband of nine years, Mark Chadwick, early in 2015.

At the 2016 Rio Olympics Meares took part in three events. She won a bronze medal in the keirin, placing tenth in the individual sprint and fourth in the team sprint.

== Commentating ==
Anna Meares, Phil Liggett, and Robbie McEwen co-hosted the Seven Network broadcast of the 2023, 2024 & 2025 Santos Men's Tour Down Under used by Peacock in the US.

== Honours ==
In 2001 Meares was awarded the Australian Junior Women's Track Cyclist of the Year. She was voted Australian Institute of Sport (AIS) Athlete of the Year in 2007 and 2011 and 2011 inducted into the AIS 'Best of the Best'. Between 2004 and 2012 she has been named Australian Elite Female Track Cyclist of the Year seven times, she also became Australian Cyclist of the Year in 2008 and 2012. She served as the Australian flag bearer at the opening ceremony of the 2014 Commonwealth Games opening ceremony.

The Anna Meares Bike Path adjacent to Sir Donald Bradman Drive near Adelaide Airport was named after Meares in 2012. On 9 December 2016, Meares received the Key to the City of Rockhampton.

Meares has a velodrome in Brisbane named after her. It is called the Anna Meares Velodrome and it was opened on 12 November 2016. It was an official venue for the track cycling at the 2018 Commonwealth Games.

In 2021, inducted into Sport Australia Hall of Fame.

Meares is a worldwide ambassador for the Port Adelaide Football Club.

== Major results ==
2001
1st 500 m TT, World Track Championships – Juniors

2002
3rd Sprint, Commonwealth Games, Manchester

2003
2nd Keirin, World Track Championships, Stuttgart

2004
1st 500 m TT, World Track Championships, Melbourne
2nd Sprint, World Track Championships, Melbourne
1st Sprint, Sydney
1st 500 m TT, Olympic Games
3rd Sprint, Olympic Games

2005
1st 500 m TT, Australian National Track Championships, Adelaide
1st Sprint, Australian National Track Championships, Adelaide
1st Keirin, Australian National Track Championships, Adelaide
1st Sprint, Sydney
1st Keirin, Sydney
2nd 500 m TT, World Track Championships, Los Angeles
3rd Sprint, World Track Championships, Los Angeles
1st Sprint, Oceania Games, Wanganui
1st 500 m TT, Oceania Games, Wanganui

2006
1st Sprint, Australian National Track Championships, Adelaide
2nd Keirin, Australian National Track Championships, Adelaide
1st Sprint, Sydney
1st 500 m TT, Commonwealth Games, Melbourne
2nd Sprint, Commonwealth Games, Melbourne
2nd 500 m TT, World Track Championships, Bordeaux
1st 500 m TT, World Cup, Sydney
1st Team Sprint, World Cup, Sydney

2007
1st 50 m TT, World Track Championships, Palma de Mallorca – New World Record
3rd Team Sprint, World Track Championships, Palma de Mallorca
3rd Sprint, World Track Championships, Palma de Mallorca
3rd Keirin, World Track Championships, Palma de Mallorca
1st Sprint, World Cup, Los Angeles
2nd Team Sprint, World Cup, Los Angeles
1st 500 m TT, Australian National Track Championships, Sydney
1st Team Sprint, Australian National Track Championships, Sydney
2nd Sprint, Australian National Track Championships, Sydney
1st Keirin, Australian National Track Championships, Sydney
3rd Sprint, World Cup, Manchester
3rd Team Sprint, World Cup, Manchester
1st Sprint, Oceania Cycling Championships, Invercargill
2nd Sprint, Sydney
1st 500 m TT, Sydney

2008
1st Sprint, SWE Grand Prix
2nd Sprint, Olympic Games
2nd Sprint, GP von Deutschland im Sprint

2009
1st 500 m TT, 2009–2010 UCI Track Cycling World Cup Classics, Manchester
1st Team Sprint (with Kaarle McCulloch), 2009–2010 UCI Track Cycling World Cup Classics, Manchester
3rd Keirin, 2009–2010 UCI Track Cycling World Cup Classics, Manchester
1st 500 m TT, 2009–2010 UCI Track Cycling World Cup Classics, Melbourne
1st Keirin, 2009–2010 UCI Track Cycling World Cup Classics, Melbourne
3rd Team Sprint, 2009–2010 UCI Track Cycling World Cup Classics, Melbourne

2010
1st 500 m TT, 2009–10 UCI Track Cycling World Ranking
1st Team sprint, 2009–10 UCI Track Cycling World Ranking
1st 500 m TT, Commonwealth Games
1st Team Sprint, Commonwealth Games
1st Individual Sprint, Commonwealth Games

2011
1st 500 m TT, 2010–11 UCI Track Cycling World Ranking
1st Keirin, 2010–11 UCI Track Cycling World Ranking

2012
1st Keirin World Track Championships, Melbourne
1st 500 m TT World Track Championships, Melbourne (33.010sec world record)
3rd Sprint World Track Championships, Melbourne (Qualifying 10.782sec world record)
3rd Team Sprint, Olympic Games
1st Sprint, Olympic Games

2013
Melbourne Cup on Wheels

1st Sprint
2nd Keirin

2014
Commonwealth Games

1st 500m Time Trial
2nd Sprint

Adelaide Cycling Grand Prix

1st Keirin
3rd Sprint

Austral

1st Sprint
2nd Keirin

2nd 500m Time Trial UCI World Track Championships
Oceania Track Championships

2nd Keirin
2nd Sprint

3rd Keirin, South Australian Track Classic

2015
1st Keirin, World Track Championships, Yvelines
Oceania Track Championships

1st Team Sprint
3rd Keirin

1st Keirin, South Australian Grand Prix
3rd Keirin, Super Drome Cup

2016
2nd Keirin, ITS Melbourne Grand Prix
3rd Keirin, Olympic Games, Rio de Janeiro

== Sponsorship ==
Meares is sponsored by Uvex safety and by Toshiba.

Awards and achievements
Preceded by Philippe Rizzo; Lydia Lassila	Australian Athlete of the Year; 2007 (with Nathan Deakes); 2011	Succeeded by Ken Wallace and Heath Francis; Alicia Coutts and Tom Slingsby
Olympic Games
Preceded by Lauren Jackson	Flagbearer for Australia; Rio de Janeiro 2016	Succeeded by Cate Campbell & Patty Mills
