= Jennie Reed =

American cyclist

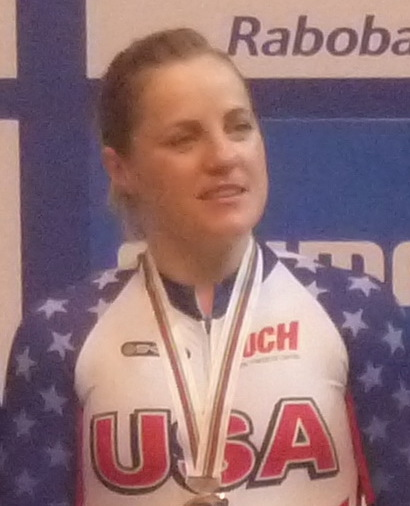

Personal information
- Full name: Jennie Idell Reed
- Born: April 20, 1978 (age 48) Kirkland, Washington, United States

Cycling career
- Sport: Cycling
- Discipline: Track
- Role: Rider
Medal record
Women's track cycling
Representing the United States
Olympic Games
Silver medal – second place	2012 London	Team pursuit
World Championships
Gold medal – first place	2008 Manchester	Keirin
Silver medal – second place	2011 Apeldoorn	Team pursuit
Bronze medal – third place	2004 Melbourne	Keirin
Bronze medal – third place	2008 Manchester	Sprint
Pan American Games
Silver medal – second place	1999 Winnipeg	Match Sprint

Jennie Idell Reed (born April 20, 1978) is a World and U.S. champion track cyclist and Olympian (2004, 2008, 2012). Jennie began track cycling at the age of 16 in Redmond, Washington. She won National titles in the match sprint and individual pursuit at her first U.S. Track Cycling National Championship in 1994. She went on to compete in the sprint disciplines at the 2004 and 2008 Olympics and the Team Pursuit in 2012.

Jennie competed in 13 World Championships, 11 consecutively. She won 25 World Cup medals between the Sprint events (Sprint & Keirin) as well as the endurance events (Scratch & Team Pursuit). Jennie is the only U.S. track cyclist to successfully transition from a sprint athlete, winning the World Championships in the Keirin to an endurance track athlete, winning a Silver Medal in the Team Pursuit at the 2012 Olympics.

== Career highlights ==
1998
1st, Matched Sprints, USA Cycling National Track Championships
3rd, World Cup, Track, Sprint, Cali
1999
2nd, World Cup, Track, Sprint, Mexico City
2002
3rd, World Cup, Track, Keirin, Moscow
2004
3rd, World Championship, Track, Keirin, Elite, Melbourne
1st, World Cup, Track, Keirin, Manchester
2nd, World Cup, Track, Keirin, Sydney
2005
3rd, World Cup, Track, Keirin, Manchester
3rd, World Cup, Track, Keirin, Sydney
1st, National Championship, Track, Sprint, Elite, United States of America, Los Angeles
1st, National Championship, Track, 500 m, Elite, United States of America, Los Angeles
1st, National Championship, Track, Keirin, Elite, United States of America, Los Angeles
2006
2nd, World Cup, Track, Keirin, Sydney (1)
1st, Matched Sprints, USA Cycling National Track Championships
1st, National Championship, Track, Sprint, Elite, United States of America, Los Angeles
1st, National Championship, Track, 500 m, Elite, United States of America, Los Angeles
1st, National Championship, Track, Keirin, Elite, United States of America, Los Angeles
1st, National Championship, Track, Team Sprint, Elite, United States of America, Los Angeles
2nd, World Cup, Track, Sprint, Sydney
2nd, World Cup, Track, Keirin, Sydney (2)
2007
3rd, World Cup, Track, Keirin, Los Angeles
1st, Pan American Cycling Championships, Keirin, Valencia, Venezuela
2nd, Pan American Cycling Championships, Sprint, Valencia, Venezuela
1st, National Championship, Track, Keirin, Elite, United States of America, Carson, California
1st, National Championship, Track, Sprint, Elite, United States of America, Carson, California
1st, National Championship, Track, Team Pursuit, Elite, United States of America, Carson, California
2nd, World Cup, Track, Keirin, Sydney
2008
2nd, World Cup, Track, Sprint, Los Angeles
1st, World Cup, Track, Keirin, Los Angeles
3rd, World Championship, Track, Sprint, Elite, Manchester
1st, World Championship, Track, Keirin, Elite, Manchester
2011
2nd, World Cup, Track, Scratch race, Manchester
3rd, World Cup, Track, Team pursuit, Manchester
