= Lori-Ann Muenzer =

Canadian cyclist (born 1966)

Personal information
- Full name: Lori-Ann Muenzer
- Born: May 21, 1966 (age 60) Toronto, Ontario, Canada

Cycling career
- Sport: Cycling
- Discipline: Track
- Role: Rider
- Rider type: Sprinter
Medal record
Women's track cycling
Representing Canada
Olympic Games
| Gold medal – first place | 2004 Athens | Sprint |
UCI Track World Championships
| Silver medal – second place | 2000 Manchester | Sprint |
| Silver medal – second place | 2001 Antwerp | 500 m time trial |
| Bronze medal – third place | 2001 Antwerp | Sprint |
| Bronze medal – third place | 2004 Melbourne | Sprint |
Commonwealth Games
| Silver medal – second place | 2002 Manchester | Sprint |
| Bronze medal – third place | 1998 Kuala Lumpur | Sprint |
| Bronze medal – third place | 2002 Manchester | Time trial |

Lori-Ann Muenzer (born 21 May 1966) is a retired Canadian track cyclist who competed between 1993 and 2004. As a Track Cycling World Championships competitor during the 2000s, she received three medals in the sprint and one in the time trial. Muenzer won two medals in sprint and one in time trial as a Commonwealth Games competitor. As a time trial competitor in the Olympic Games, she was 13th at the 2000 Summer Olympics and seventh at the 2004 Summer Olympics.

Muenzer was a gold medal-winning athlete at the 2004 Summer Olympics in the sprint. She is "the first Canadian ... to win an Olympic cycling gold medal." Muenzer was the only Canadian until Kelsey Mitchell received gold at the 2020 Summer Olympics. She held two Cycling Canada records for over ten years. Outside of sports, Muenzer worked as a legal secretary between the late 1990s and 2020. She received the Bobbie Rosenfeld Award in 2004 and joined the Canada's Sports Hall of Fame in 2015.

== Early life ==
Muenzer was born in Toronto, Ontario, on 21 May 1966. She started riding bicycles during her childhood.

== Career ==
=== 1987 to 2004 ===
Muenzer became a cyclist in the late 1980s. During 1993, she turned professional. Muenzer underwent physical therapy after a clavicle fracture during April 1994. Her injury prevented her from competing at the 1994 Commonwealth Games. She stopped racing between 1994 and February 1996 due to tendonitis. Muenzer experienced additional injuries leading up to 2000.

As a Track Cycling World Championships competitor, Muenzer received silver at the 2000 World Championships in the sprint. During the sprint at the 2001 edition, she received bronze. Muentzer competed in the time trial that year and received silver. She received bronze in the sprint during 2004.

Muenzer won bronze at the 1998 Commonwealth Games during the sprint. Her podium finishes at the 2002 Commonwealth Games were "silver in the women's sprint ... [and] bronze in the 500-metre time trial." During that year's closing ceremony, she represented Canada as their flagbearer.

At the 2000 Summer Olympics, she was 13th in the track time trial. During the 2004 Summer Olympics, she was seventh in the track time trial. Muenzer won gold in that year's women's sprint. She was "the first Canadian ... to win an Olympic cycling gold medal." She remained the only Canadian until Kelsey Mitchell received gold at the 2020 Summer Olympics.

In her overall career, Muenzer became the Cycling Canada record holder in the flying 200m and the 500m time trial during 2002. She broke the 500m time trial record during the 2004 Summer Olympics. Her records were surpassed by Monique Sullivan and Kate O’Brien during 2014.

=== 2005 - present ===
Muenzer prepared the 2005 World Masters Games as an ambassador. By October 2005, Muenzer had started her motivational speaking career by creating Pure Momentum. She decided to go on a sabbatical that month due to financial issues. She wrote her 2006 biography, One Gear No Breaks, with Karl Wilberg. Muenzer started working in children's cycling with the Lori-Ann Muenzer Program that year. She ended her cycling career in October 2006.

Outside of cycling, Muenzer was working as a legal secretary during the late 1990s. After her 1999 move to Edmonton, Muenzer continued her experience with Field, Atkinson, Petraton. After they became Field Law in 2003, she remained with them during the mid-2000s. She continued her legal career leading up to 2020.

== Nominations and honours ==
Muenzer received the Bobbie Rosenfeld Female Athlete of the Year Award in 2004. She was a presenter at that year's Canadian Country Music Awards. Muenzer was nominated for the 2005 Syl Apps Athlete of the Year Award. She was a Female Athlete of the Year finalist at that year's Canadian Sport Awards.

Muenzer entered the Alberta Sports Hall of Fame during 2005. She was inducted into Canada's Sports Hall of Fame in 2015. She also joined the Canadian Cycling Hall of Fame that year.

== Personal life ==
During her sports career, Muenzer was called Rolling Thunder. She spent six years in Montreal before moving back to Toronto in the mid-1990s. Muenzer dealt with hypoglycemia during her cycling career. She experienced cyclothymia as part of her mental health conditions.
