= Tamilla Abassova =

Russian cyclist

Personal information
- Full name: Tamilla Rashidovna Abassova
- Born: 9 December 1982 (age 43) Moscow, Soviet Union

Cycling career
- Sport: Cycling
- Discipline: Track
- Role: Rider
- Rider type: Sprinter
Medal record
Representing Russia
Women's track cycling
Olympic Games
Silver medal – second place	2004 Athens	Sprint
World Championships
Silver medal – second place	2005 Los Angeles	Sprint

Tamilla Rashidovna Abassova (Azerbaijani: Tamilla Rəşid qızı Abbasova, Russian: Тамилла Рашидовна Абасова; born 9 December 1982, in Moscow) is a Russian racing cyclist who won the silver medal in the women's sprint event at the 2004 Summer Olympics in Athens and the silver medal at the 2005 UCI Track Cycling World Championships in the same event.

She is of mixed Azerbaijani-Russian descent, and a practicing Baptist.
