= 2007 UCI Track Cycling World Championships – Men's team pursuit =

Men's team pursuit at the 2007 UCI Track Cycling World Championships
- Venue: Palma Arena
- Location: Palma de Mallorca, Spain
- Winning time: 3:57.468

Medalists
gold medal	Edward Clancy; Geraint Thomas; Paul Manning; Bradley Wiggins	Great Britain
silver medal	Lyubomyr Polatayko; Maksym Polischyuk; Vitaliy Popkov; Vitaliy Shchedov; Roman Kononenko	Ukraine
bronze medal	Casper Jørgensen; Jens-Erik Madsen; Michael Mørkøv; Alex Rasmussen	Denmark

The Men's Team Pursuit was one of the 10 men's events at the 2007 UCI Track World Championships, held in Palma de Mallorca, Spain on March 30, 2007.

49 cyclists from 12 countries participated in the contest. After the qualification, the fastest two teams advanced to the final and the 3rd and 4th fastest raced for the bronze medal.

The qualification took place on March 30 at 10:00 and the Finals on the same day at 20:15.

== World record ==
World Record
WR	3:56.610	Australia	Athens (Greece)	August 22, 2004

== Qualifying ==
Rank	Name	Country	1000m	2000m	3000m	Time	Speed (km/h)	Q
Rank	Name	Country	1000m	1000-2000	2000-3000	3000-4000	Speed (km/h)	Q
1	Edward Clancy; Geraint Thomas; Paul Manning; Bradley Wiggins	Great Britain	1:04.229 (1)	2:02.491 (1)	3:00.761 (1)	3:59.579	60.105	QF
1	Edward Clancy; Geraint Thomas; Paul Manning; Bradley Wiggins	Great Britain		58.262 (1)	58.270 (1)	58.818 (1)		
2	Roman Kononenko; Lyubomyr Polatayko; Maksym Polischyuk; Vitaliy Shchedov	Ukraine	1:05.448 (5)	2:04.710 (3)	3:04.478 (2)	4:05.039	58.766	QF
2	Roman Kononenko; Lyubomyr Polatayko; Maksym Polischyuk; Vitaliy Shchedov	Ukraine		59.262 (4)	59.768 (2)	1:00.561 (3)		
3	Casper Jørgensen; Jens-Erik Madsen; Michael Mørkøv; Alex Rasmussen	Denmark	1:05.210 (3)	2:04.419 (2)	3:04.789 (3)	4:05.307	58.701	QB
3	Casper Jørgensen; Jens-Erik Madsen; Michael Mørkøv; Alex Rasmussen	Denmark		59.209 (3)	1:00.370 (6)	1:00.518 (2)		
4	Sam Bewley; Westley Gough; Peter Latham; Marc Ryan	New Zealand	1:06.016 (8)	2:05.554 (7)	3:05.812 (5)	4:06.611	58.391	QB
4	Sam Bewley; Westley Gough; Peter Latham; Marc Ryan	New Zealand		59.538 (5)	1:00.258 (4)	1:00.799 (5)		
5	Robert Bartko; Robert Bengsch; Guido Fulst; Leif Lampater	Germany	1:05.382 (4)	2:05.273 (6)	3:06.014 (7)	4:07.221	58.247	
5	Robert Bartko; Robert Bengsch; Guido Fulst; Leif Lampater	Germany		59.891 (7)	1:00.741 (8)	1:01.207 (6)		
6	Peter Dawson; Zakkari Dempster; Matthew Harley Goss; Mark Jamieson	Australia	1:04.767 (2)	2:05.119 (5)	3:05.850 (6)	4:07.447	58.194	
6	Peter Dawson; Zakkari Dempster; Matthew Harley Goss; Mark Jamieson	Australia		1:00.352 (9)	1:00.731 (7)	1:01.597 (7)		
7	Jenning Huizenga; Ismaël Kip; Jens Mouris; Peter Schep	Netherlands	1:06.956 (11)	2:07.158 (9)	3:07.198 (9)	4:07.775	58.117	
7	Jenning Huizenga; Ismaël Kip; Jens Mouris; Peter Schep	Netherlands		1:00.202 (8)	1:00.040 (3)	1:00.577 (4)		
8	Ivan Kovalev; Ivan Rovny; Alexander Serov; Nikolay Trussov	Russia	1:05.828 (7)	2:05.633 (8)	3:06.568 (8)	4:08.308	57.992	
8	Ivan Kovalev; Ivan Rovny; Alexander Serov; Nikolay Trussov	Russia		59.805 (6)	1:00.935 (9)	1:01.740 (8)		
9	Sergi Escobar Roure; Asier Maeztu Billelabeitia; David Muntaner Juaneda; Carlos Torrent Tarres	Spain	1:05.671 (6)	2:04.849 (4)	3.05.181 (4)	4:10.098	57.577	
9	Sergi Escobar Roure; Asier Maeztu Billelabeitia; David Muntaner Juaneda; Carlos Torrent Tarres	Spain		59.178 (2)	1:00.332 (5)	1:04.917 (11)		
10	Dominique Cornu; Kenny De Ketele; Ingmar De Poortere; Tim Mertens	Belgium	1:06.597 (9)	2:07.285 (10)	3:08.816 (10)	4:11.357	57.289	
10	Dominique Cornu; Kenny De Ketele; Ingmar De Poortere; Tim Mertens	Belgium		1:00.688 (10)	1:01.531 (10)	1:02.541 (9)		
11	Kevin Lalouette; Alexandre Lemair; Nicolas Rousseau; Fabien Sanchez	France	1:07.543 (12)	2:08.488 (11)	3:10.308 (11)	4:13.021	56.912	
11	Kevin Lalouette; Alexandre Lemair; Nicolas Rousseau; Fabien Sanchez	France		1:00.945 (11)	1:01.820 (11)	1:02.713 (10)		
12	Gianpaolo Biolo; Marco Coledan; Giairo Ermeti; Daniel Oss	Italy	1:06.635 (10)	2:09.143 (12)	3:13.539 (12)	4:19.480	55.495	
12	Gianpaolo Biolo; Marco Coledan; Giairo Ermeti; Daniel Oss	Italy		1:02.508 (12)	1:04.396 (12)	1:05.941 (12)		

== Finals ==
Rank	Name	Country	1000m	2000m	3000m	Time	Speed (km/h)
Rank	Name	Country	1000m	1000-2000	2000-3000	3000-4000	Speed (km/h)
Gold Medal Race
	Edward Clancy; Geraint Thomas; Paul Manning; Bradley Wiggins	Great Britain	1:04.028 (1)	2:02.021 (1)	3:00.021 (1)	3:57.468	60.639
	Edward Clancy; Geraint Thomas; Paul Manning; Bradley Wiggins	Great Britain		57.993 (1)	58.000 (1)	57.447 (1)	
	Lyubomyr Polatayko; Maksym Polischyuk; Vitaliy Popkov; Vitaliy Shchedov	Ukraine	1:05.190 (2)	2:03.539 (2)	3:02.482 (2)	4:03.280	59.191
	Lyubomyr Polatayko; Maksym Polischyuk; Vitaliy Popkov; Vitaliy Shchedov	Ukraine		58.349 (2)	58.943 (2)	1:00.798 (2)	
Bronze Medal Race
	Casper Jørgensen; Jens-Erik Madsen; Michael Mørkøv; Alex Rasmussen	Denmark	1:04.824 (1)	2:03.910 (1)	3:04.006 (1)	4:04.093	58.993
	Casper Jørgensen; Jens-Erik Madsen; Michael Mørkøv; Alex Rasmussen	Denmark		59.086 (1)	1:00.096 (2)	1:00.087 (1)	
4	Sam Bewley; Westley Gough; Peter Latham; Marc Ryan	New Zealand	1:05.667 (2)	2:05.313 (2)	3:05.254 (2)	4:06.591	58.396
4	Sam Bewley; Westley Gough; Peter Latham; Marc Ryan	New Zealand		59.636 (2)	59.941 (1)	1:01.337 (2)	
