= Vitaliy Shchedov =

Ukrainian cyclist

Personal information
- Full name: Vitaliy Shchedov
- Born: 31 July 1987 (age 39)

Cycling career
- Sport: Cycling
- Discipline: Track
- Role: Rider
- Rider type: Pursuit
Medal record
Representing Ukraine
Men's track cycling
World Championships
Silver medal – second place	2007 Palma de Mallorca	Team pursuit

Vitaliy Shchedov (born 31 July 1987) is a Ukrainian professional racing cyclist.

== Career highlights ==
Date	Placing	Event	Competition	Location	Country
4 March 2006	2	Team pursuit (Note: The other riders on the squad were Lyubomyr Polatayko, Maksym Polyshchuk and Vitaliy Popkov)	World Cup	Sydney	Australia
18 November 2006	3	Team pursuit (Note: The other riders on the squad were Roman Kononenko, Lyubomyr Polatayko and Maksym Polischuk)	World Cup	Sydney	Australia
20 January 2007	1	Team pursuit (Note: The other riders on the squad were Lyubomyr Polatayko, Maxim Polischuk and Vitaliy Popkov)	World Cup	Los Angeles	United States
30 March 2007	2nd place, silver medalist(s)	Team pursuit (Note: The other riders on the squad were Roman Kononenko, Lyubomyr Polatayko and Maksym Polischyuk)	World Championships	Palma de Mallorca	Spain
19 January 2008	3	Team pursuit (Note: The other riders on the squad were Lyubomyr Polatayko, Maxim Polischuk and Vitaliy Popkov)	World Cup	Los Angeles	United States
31 October 2008	2	Individual pursuit	World Cup	Manchester	United Kingdom
20 November 2008	3	Individual pursuit	World Cup	Melbourne	Australia
21 November 2008	3	Team pursuit (Note: The other riders on the squad were Roman Kononenko, Sergiy Lagkuti and Lyubomyr Polatayko)	World Cup	Melbourne	Australia
16 January 2009	2	Individual pursuit	World Cup	Beijing	China
30 October 2009	3	Individual pursuit	World Cup	Manchester	United Kingdom
1 November 2009	3	Team pursuit (Note: The other riders on the squad were Maksym Fonrabe, Maksym Polishchuk and Roman Kononenko)	World Cup	Manchester	United Kingdom
19 November 2009	3	Individual pursuit	World Cup	Melbourne	Australia
22 January 2010	1	Individual pursuit	World Cup	Beijing	China
22 January 2010	1	Individual pursuit	World Cup	Overall	
