= Maxim Polischuk =

Ukrainian cyclist

Personal information
- Full name: Maxim Polischuk; Ukrainian: Максим Поліщук
- Born: 15 June 1984 (age 42) Zhytomyr, Ukrainian SSR, Soviet Union
- Height: 1.78 m (5 ft 10 in)
- Weight: 72 kg (159 lb)

Cycling career
- Sport: Cycling
- Current team: Retired
- Discipline: Track
- Role: Rider
- Rider type: Pursuit

Amateur team
- Dynamo Donetsk
Medal record
Men's track cycling
Representing Ukraine
World Championships
Silver medal – second place	2007 Palma de Mallorca	Team pursuit
Bronze medal – third place	2006 Bordeaux	Team pursuit

Maxim Polischuk (Ukrainian: Максим Поліщук; born 15 June 1984, in Zhytomyr) is a retired Ukrainian amateur track cyclist. He won the bronze medal in men's team pursuit at the 2006 UCI Track Cycling World Championships in Bordeaux, France, and later represented his nation Ukraine at the 2008 Summer Olympics.

Polishchuk qualified for the Ukrainian squad in the men's team pursuit at the 2008 Summer Olympics in Beijing based on the nation's selection process from the UCI Track World Rankings. He delivered the Ukrainian foursome of Volodymyr Dyudya, Lyubomyr Polatayko, and Vitaliy Shchedov a ninth-place time of 4:07.883 in the prelims, narrowly missing out the match round by more than a second. He now works as a bike mechanic at Iron Bikes, a famous bike store in Belgium.

== Career highlights ==
2004
(gold) UCI European Junior Track Cycling Championships (Team pursuit), Valencia (ESP)
2006
(bronze) UCI Track Cycling World Championships (Team pursuit), Bordeaux (FRA)
2008
9th Olympic Games (Team pursuit), Beijing (CHN)
