= Cycling at the 2006 Commonwealth Games – Men's points race =

The men's points race at the 2006 Commonwealth Games took place on March 17, 2006 at the Vodafone Arena.

== Qualification ==
=== Heat 1 ===
Rank	Rider	Total Points
1	Sean Finning (AUS)	34
2	Mohd Jasmin Bin Ruslan (MAS)	30
3	Ian Stannard (ENG)	27
4	Mark Richard Kelly (IOM)	25
5	Greg Henderson (NZL)	23
6	Martin Gilbert (CAN)	23
7	James McCallum (SCO)	21
8	Durwan Benjamin (RSA)	20
9	Ross Sander (WAL)	12
10	Jonathan Matthew Bellis (IOM)	7
11	Emile Abraham (TRI)	4
12	Jason Perryman (BAR)	0
	Jude Nathaniel Bentley (GUY)	

=== Heat 2 ===
Rank	Rider	Total Points
1	Evan Oliphant (SCO)	29
2	Richard Bowker (NZL)	28
3	Mark Cavendish (IOM)	25
4	Matthew Brammeier (WAL)	25
5	Hayden Roulston (NZL)	23
6	Zachary Bell (CAN)	11
7	Andy Tennant (ENG)	7
8	Peter Dawson (AUS)	6
9	Geraint Thomas (WAL)	6
10	Edward Clancy (ENG)	5
11	Garth Conrad Thomas (RSA)	1
12	Oniel Samuels (JAM)	-20
	Warren Christopher McKay (GUY)	
	Philip Clarke (BAR)	

== Final ==
Rank	Rider	Total Points
1st place, gold medalist(s)	Sean Finning (AUS)	137
2nd place, silver medalist(s)	Hayden Roulston (NZL)	119
3rd place, bronze medalist(s)	Geraint Thomas (WAL)	110
4	Evan Oliphant (SCO)	109
5	Mark Richard Kelly (IOM)	106
6	Peter Dawson (AUS)	70
7	Edward Clancy (ENG)	66
8	Zachary Bell (CAN)	60
9	James McCallum (SCO)	43
10	Andy Tennant (ENG)	43
11	Mark Cavendish (IOM)	38
12	Richard Bowker (NZL)	27
13	Jonathan Matthew Bellis (IOM)	26
14	Greg Henderson (NZL)	24
15	Matthew Brammeier (WAL)	20
16	Ross Sander (WAL)	13
17	Martin Gilbert (CAN)	5
18	Ian Stannard (ENG)	0
19	Garth Conrad Thomas (RSA)	-20
20	Mohd Jasmin Bin Ruslan (MAS)	-20
21	Durwan Benjamin (RSA)	-20
	Emile Abraham (TRI)	
