= 2006 UCI Track Cycling World Championships =

Cycling world championships

- Venue: Bordeaux, France
- Date: April 13–April 16, 2006
- Velodrome: Vélodrome de Bordeaux

The 2006 UCI Track Cycling World Championships were the World Championship for track cycling. They took place in Bordeaux, France from April 13 to April 16, 2006.

== Medal table ==
Rank	Nation	Gold	Silver	Bronze	Total
1	Netherlands (NED)	3	1	0	4
2	France (FRA)	2	1	2	5
3	Belarus (BLR)	2	0	1	3
3	Germany (GER)	2	0	1	3
5	Great Britain (GBR)	1	4	1	6
6	Australia (AUS)	1	2	2	5
7	Spain (ESP)	1	1	1	3
8	Colombia (COL)	1	0	0	1
8	Italy (ITA)	1	0	0	1
8	United States (USA)	1	0	0	1
11	Russia (RUS)	0	2	1	3
12	Argentina (ARG)	0	1	1	2
12	Ukraine (UKR)	0	1	1	2
14	Canada (CAN)	0	1	0	1
14	Poland (POL)	0	1	0	1
16	China (CHN)	0	0	2	2
17	Cuba (CUB)	0	0	1	1
17	Greece (GRE)	0	0	1	1
Totals (18 entries)		15	15	15	45

== Medal summary ==
Event	Gold		Silver		Bronze	
Men's Events
Men's sprint	Theo Bos; Netherlands		Craig MacLean; Great Britain		Stefan Nimke; Germany	
Men's 1 km time trial	Chris Hoy; Great Britain		Ben Kersten; Australia		François Pervis; France	
Men's individual pursuit	Robert Bartko; Germany	4:18.519	Jens Mouris; Netherlands	4:23.474	Paul Manning; Great Britain	4:21.097
Men's team pursuit	Peter Dawson; Matthew Goss; Mark Jamieson; Stephen Wooldridge; Australia		Steve Cummings; Geraint Thomas; Paul Manning; Rob Hayles; Great Britain		Volodimir Diudia; Roman Kononenko; Liubomir Polataiko; Maksim Polyshchuk; Ukraine	
Men's team sprint	Grégory Baugé; Mickaël Bourgain; Arnaud Tournant; France		Jason Queally; Chris Hoy; Jamie Staff; Great Britain		Shane Perkins; Ryan Bayley; Shane Kelly; Australia	
Men's keirin	Theo Bos; Netherlands		José Antonio Escuredo; Spain		Arnaud Tournant; France	
Men's scratch	Jérôme Neuville; France		Ángel Darío Colla; Argentina		Ioannis Tamouridis; Greece	
Men's points race	Peter Schep; Netherlands	31	Rafał Ratajczak; Poland	18	Vasili Kiriyenka; Belarus	15
Men's madison	Joan Llaneras; Isaac Gálvez; Spain	16	Liubomir Polataiko; Volodymyr Rybin; Ukraine	11	Juan Curuchet; Walter Pérez; Argentina	9
Women's Events
Women's sprint	Natalia Tsylinskaya; Belarus		Victoria Pendleton; Great Britain		Guo Shuang; China	
Women's 500 m time trial	Natalia Tsylinskaya; Belarus	34.152	Anna Meares; Australia	34.352	Lisandra Guerra Rodríguez; Cuba	34.609
Women's individual pursuit	Sarah Hammer; United States		Olga Sliusareva; Russia		Katie Mactier; Australia	
Women's keirin	Christine Mucke; Germany		Clara Sanchez; France		Guo Shuang; China	
Women's scratch	María Luisa Calle; Colombia		Gina Grain; Canada		Olga Sliusareva; Russia	
Women's points race	Vera Carrara; Italy	35	Olga Sliusareva; Russia	35	Gema Pascual Torrecilla; Spain	30
