= Geraint Thomas =

Welsh racing cyclist (born 1986)

Geraint Thomas OBE
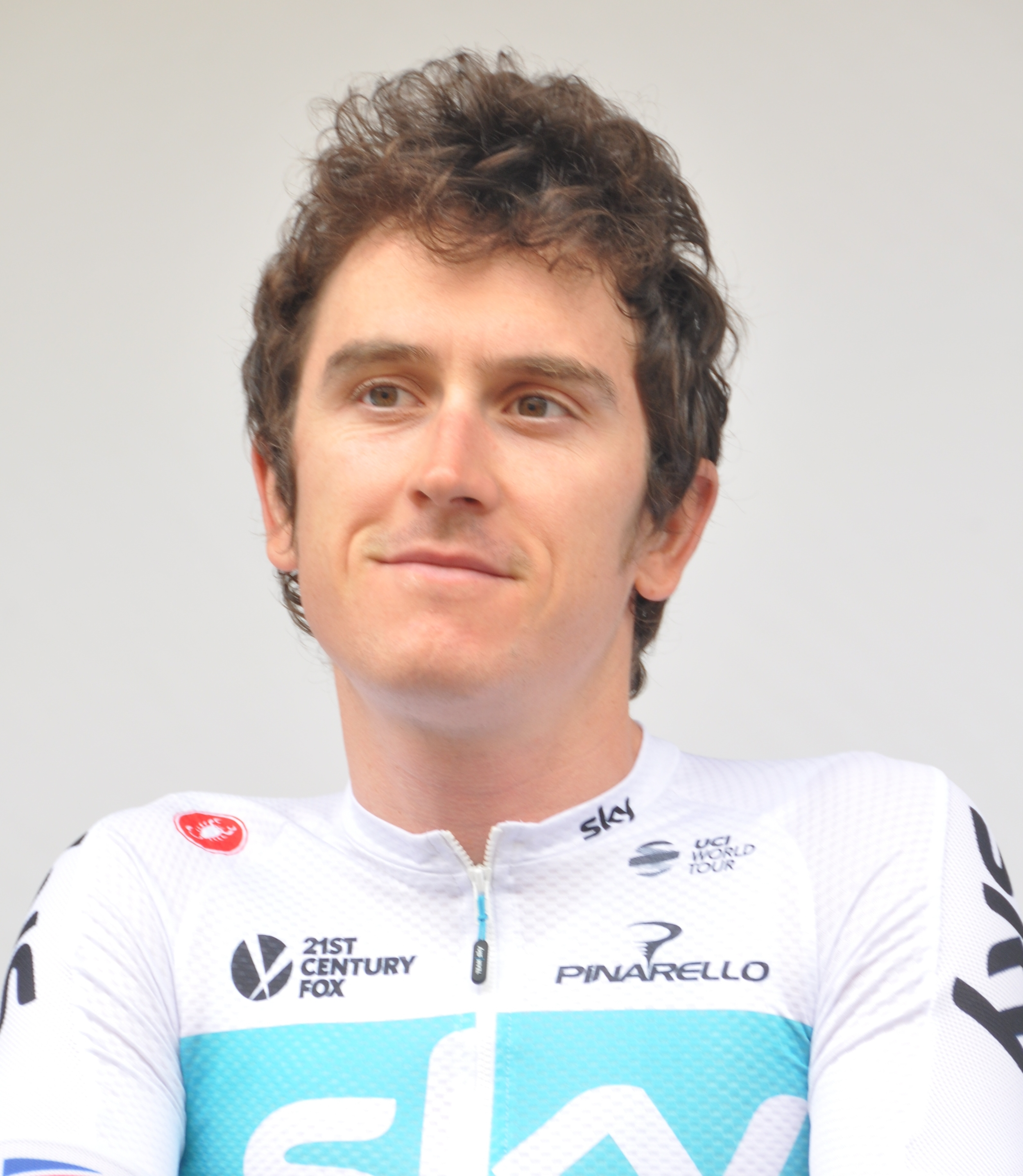
- Thomas at the 2018 Deutschland Tour

Personal information
- Full name: Geraint Howell Thomas
- Nickname: G
- Born: 25 May 1986 (age 40) Cardiff, Wales
- Height: 1.83 m (6 ft 0 in)
- Weight: 71 kg (157 lb)

Cycling career
- Sport: Cycling
- Current team: Netcompany–Ineos
- Disciplines: Road; Track
- Role: Rider
- Rider type: All-rounder (road); Time trialist Climber; Pursuiter (track)

Amateur teams
- Maindy Flyers Youth Cycling Club /CC Cardiff
- Cardiff JIF
- 2005: Team Wiesenhof (stagiaire)
- 2006: Saunier Duval–Prodir (stagiaire)

Professional teams
- 2006: Recycling.co.uk
- 2007–2009: Barloworld
- 2010–2025: Team Sky

Major wins
- Road Grand Tours Tour de France General classification (2018) 3 individual stages (2017, 2018) Stage races Paris–Nice (2016) Critérium du Dauphiné (2018) Tour de Romandie (2021) Tour de Suisse (2022) Bayern Rundfahrt (2011, 2014) Volta ao Algarve (2015, 2016) Tour of the Alps (2017) One-day races and Classics National Road Race Championships (2010) National Time Trial Championships (2018) E3 Harelbeke (2015) Track Olympic Games Team pursuit (2008, 2012) World Championships Team pursuit (2007, 2008, 2012)
Medal record
Men's track cycling
Representing Great Britain
Olympic Games
Gold medal – first place	2008 Beijing	Team pursuit
Gold medal – first place	2012 London	Team pursuit
World Championships
Gold medal – first place	2007 Palma de Mallorca	Team pursuit
Gold medal – first place	2008 Manchester	Team pursuit
Gold medal – first place	2012 Melbourne	Team pursuit
Silver medal – second place	2006 Bordeaux	Team pursuit
Silver medal – second place	2012 Melbourne	Madison
Representing Wales
Commonwealth Games
Bronze medal – third place	2006 Melbourne	Points race
Men's road cycling
Representing Team Sky
World Championships
Bronze medal – third place	2013 Tuscany	Team time trial
Representing Wales
Commonwealth Games
Gold medal – first place	2014 Glasgow	Road race
Bronze medal – third place	2014 Glasgow	Time trial
Bronze medal – third place	2022 Birmingham	Time trial

Geraint Howell Thomas (/ˈɡɛraɪnt/ GHERR-eyent, Welsh: [ˈɡɛraint]; born 25 May 1986) is a Welsh former professional racing cyclist who rode for UCI WorldTeam Netcompany–Ineos, Wales and Great Britain. He is one of the few riders in the modern era to achieve significant elite success as both a track and road rider, with notable victories in the velodrome, in one-day racing and in stage racing. On the track, he won three World Championships (2007, 2008, and 2012), and two Olympic gold medals (2008 and 2012), while on the road he won the 2018 Tour de France becoming the first Welshman and third British rider to win it.

His early successes were in track cycling, in which he was a specialist in the team pursuit. He won three World Championships and was Olympic gold medallist twice, in 2008 and 2012. Thomas had an early win on the road at the 2004 Paris–Roubaix Juniors and later had a senior victory at the 2010 British National Road Race Championships. Leaving track cycling to focus solely on the road, he subsequently found success in both one-day/classic races such as the 2014 Commonwealth Games road race and the 2015 E3 Harelbeke, and in one week stage races, most notably at the 2016 Paris–Nice, the 2017 Tour of the Alps, the 2018 Critérium du Dauphiné, the 2021 Tour de Romandie and the 2022 Tour de Suisse.

In cycling's grand tours, Thomas was initially a lead domestique to Chris Froome in his victories. He won the first stage of the 2017 Tour de France, an individual time trial, to become the first Welshman to wear the Tour's yellow jersey. He later crashed in that race, as well as in the 2017 Giro d'Italia. Thomas became the first Welshman to win the Tour de France when he won the race in 2018. He gained the yellow jersey by winning stage 11, extended his lead by winning stage 12, and retained the lead for the remainder of the race. In the same year he won the BBC Sports Personality of the Year Award, becoming the first Welshman to win the award since Ryan Giggs in 2009. In 2019, he confirmed his Grand Tour pedigree when he reached the podium again, having finished runner-up in the Tour de France behind Team INEOS teammate Egan Bernal. In 2022, Thomas became the first Welshman to win the Tour de Suisse and later that year recorded another podium finish at the Tour de France, placing third. A fourth grand tour podium, and a first outside of the Tour de France, was won in 2023 as Thomas took second place in the Giro d'Italia, losing the race lead to Primož Roglič on the penultimate day. A fifth grand tour podium was secured in the following Giro, less than half a minute behind runner-up Danny Martinez, but almost ten minutes behind winner Tadej Pogacar. After the race, Thomas suggested he would no longer race for general classification at the grand tours.

== Early life and amateur career ==
Born in Cardiff, Wales, Thomas attended Whitchurch High School from 1996 to 2003. He began cycling with the Maindy Flyers Cycling Club at Maindy Stadium at the age of 10, where he rode with future Team Sky teammate Luke Rowe, before going on to ride for other local clubs, Cycling Club Cardiff and Cardiff Just in Front. His first race bike was a blue Giant. Following some successes in under-14 and under-16 events, including National Championships, his first notable success came when he won silver medal in the points race at the 2004 UEC European Track Championships, at that time a junior and under-23 event.

== Professional career ==
=== 2005–2006: early years ===
Thomas became a member of British Cycling's Olympic Academy. He won the Carwyn James Junior Award at the BBC Wales Sports Personality of the Year ceremony. Thomas competed at World Cup events around the world, and was training in Sydney, Australia, in February 2005 when he crashed after the rider in front of him hit a piece of metal in the road which was flicked up into Thomas's wheel. He suffered internal bleeding after the piece of metal entered his body during the fall, rupturing his spleen which subsequently had to be removed.

He rode most of his races of 2006 for Recycling.co.uk, but towards the end of 2006 joined Saunier Duval–Prodir as a stagiaire. He also rode a few races, such as the Tour of Britain, for the Great Britain squad.

=== 2007: Tour de France debut ===
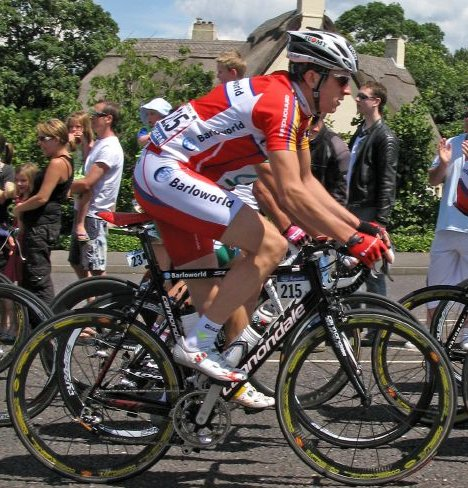
Thomas during the first stage of the 2007 Tour de France

Thomas made his Tour de France debut at the 2007 race as the youngest rider in the race as Barloworld picked up one of the three wildcard spots allocated for the race. He became the first Welsh rider to compete in the race since Colin Lewis in 1967. Thomas received great support from Welsh fans at the opening of the race, with several following the entire race. He completed his first Tour de France, finishing 140th of 141 finishers.

He was nominated for the BBC Wales Sports Personality of the Year award in 2007. The winners were announced on 2 December, and Thomas came third in the public vote.

=== 2008: Olympic gold ===
Thomas did not compete in the Tour de France, instead, he rode the Giro d'Italia earlier in the season before returning to Britain to concentrate on preparations for the Summer Olympics in Beijing. On discovering that the flags of non-participating nations would not be allowed at the Games, Thomas said: "It would be great to do a lap of honour draped in the Welsh flag if I win a gold medal, and I'm very disappointed if this rule means that would not be possible."

On 17 August, Thomas was a member of the Olympic team pursuit squad which broke the world record in the heats with a time of 3:55.202, beating their Russian opponents comfortably to go through to the final ride-off for silver and gold. The following day, on their way to winning the gold medal, the British Team pursuit broke their own world record in a time of 3:53.314, beating their Danish competitors by 6.7 seconds. Thomas had been a possible contender in the individual pursuit, but opted not to ride both events as he did not want to compromise the efforts of his team. He had also been considered to compete in the Madison with Bradley Wiggins but it was Mark Cavendish who was selected to do so; Chris Boardman stated that "Geraint keeps surpassing people's expectations".

Following the disqualification of fellow Barloworld teammate, Moisés Dueñas, from the Tour de France, Thomas expressed his strong anti-doping opinions on his blog on the BBC 6-0-6 website: "...if someone is fraudulent in a business, wouldn't they be facing a prison term? I don't see how riders taking drugs to win races and lying to their teams is any different. Bang them up and throw away the key!"

In December, he was appointed Member of the Order of the British Empire (MBE) in the 2009 New Year Honours.

=== 2009 ===
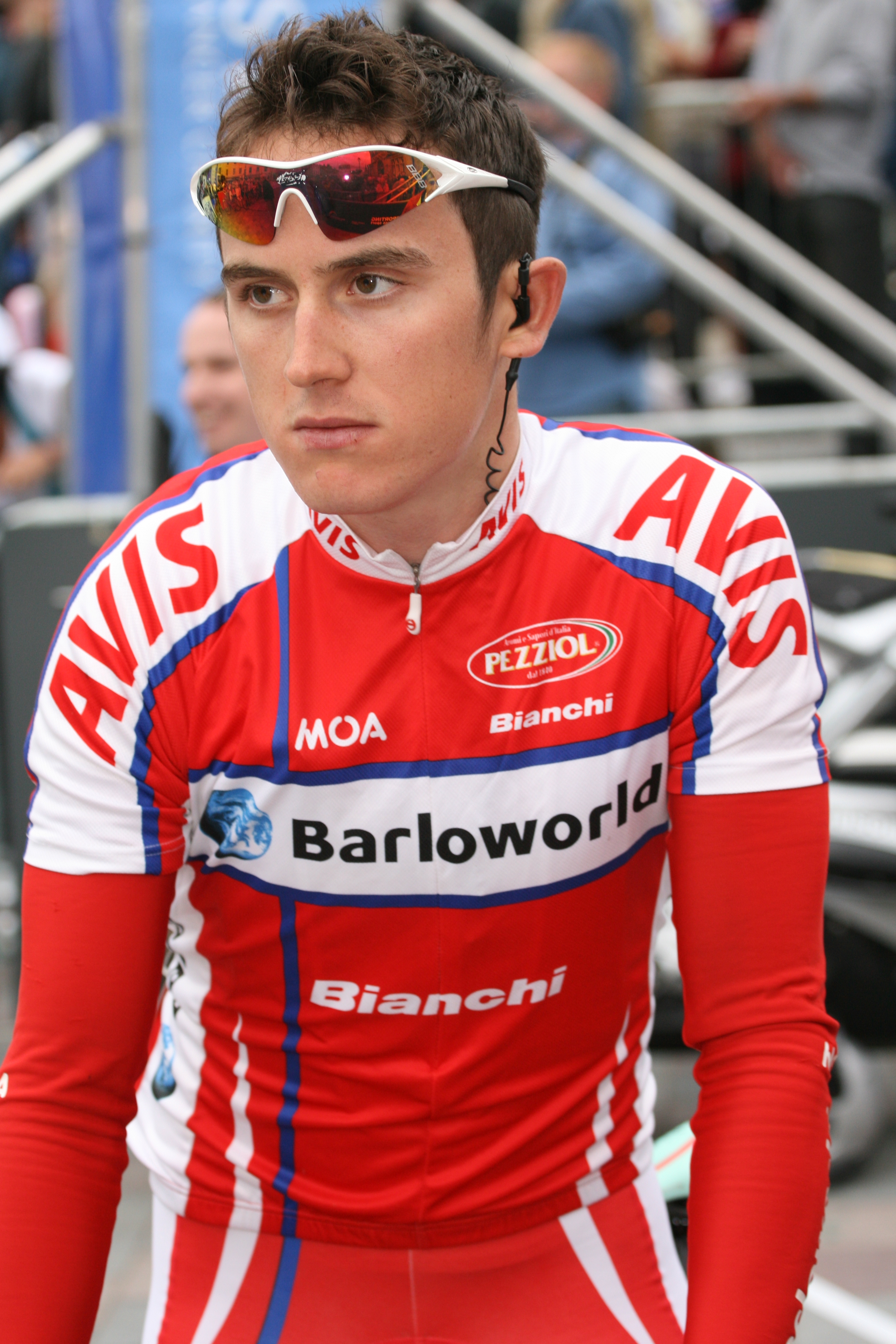
Thomas at the 2009 Tour of Britain

Thomas suffered a bad start to his 2009 season when he broke his pelvis and fractured his nose in a fall; he crashed into a safety barrier having misjudged a turn in the time trial stage of the Tirreno–Adriatico in Macerata, Italy. The crash came shortly after an 8 km (5.0 mi) time check showed he was second fastest on the road. Although he was able to return to his team hotel from hospital the same day, a period of 20 days complete rest was required before he would be able to resume training.

On 30 October 2009, Thomas set the fastest pursuit time under current rules, at the time, when he completed 4 kilometres (2.5 miles) in 4:15.105 at the first round of the 2009–10 UCI Track Cycling World Cup Classics at Manchester Velodrome. Thomas's time was only surpassed by Chris Boardman's 4:11.114, set in 1996 on a bicycle position that had since been banned. On 1 November, on the last day of the World Cup round, Thomas was a member of the team pursuit squad which set the second-fastest time ever on their way to the gold medal, setting a new track record of 3 minutes 54.395 seconds in the process.

Thomas was runner-up to Ryan Giggs in the BBC Wales Sports Personality of the Year award in 2009; the winners were announced on 8 December. He left Barloworld at the end of 2009 to join new British team, Team Sky.

=== 2010: move to Team Sky ===
Thomas began 2010 as part of the team time trial winning team for Sky at the Tour of Qatar. After competing in the classics, he impressed at the Critérium du Dauphiné, finishing in the top ten in each of the opening four stages. As a result of these finishes, he was the leader in green jersey competition for stages two, four and six. He finished fifth in the green jersey competition overall, and twenty-first in the general classification.

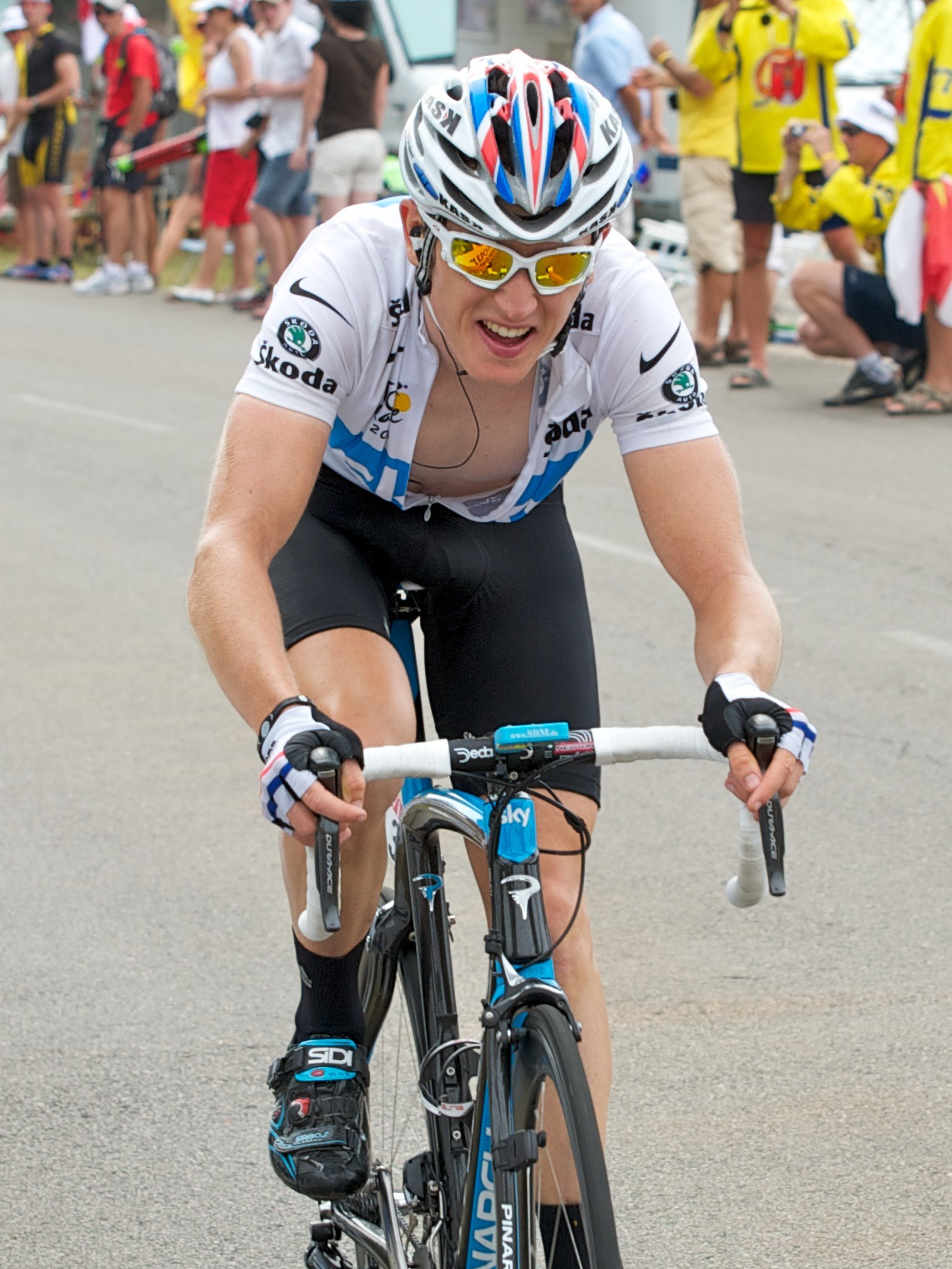
Thomas at the 2010 Tour de France, wearing the white jersey of the young rider classification leader

Thomas beat teammate Peter Kennaugh to win the 2010 British National Road Race Championships. His good form continued into the Tour de France, in which he finished fifth in the prologue, a second behind the highest-placed overall contender Lance Armstrong. He then finished second on stage three, a stage that was marred by numerous crashes and splits in the peloton, which Thomas managed to avoid. This led to him leading the young rider classification after stage three. He finished 67th overall in the Tour, and ninth in the young rider classification.

Thomas had been due to travel to Delhi, India, in September to compete in the Commonwealth Games, but pulled out, as did several other cyclists, due to health concerns. Dengue fever was one specific concern cited. Illness was especially a risk for Thomas following the removal of his spleen in 2005. Following the decision, Thomas said "It's a massive disappointment, I only get to ride for Wales once every four years, but that's the decision I had to make."

=== 2011 ===
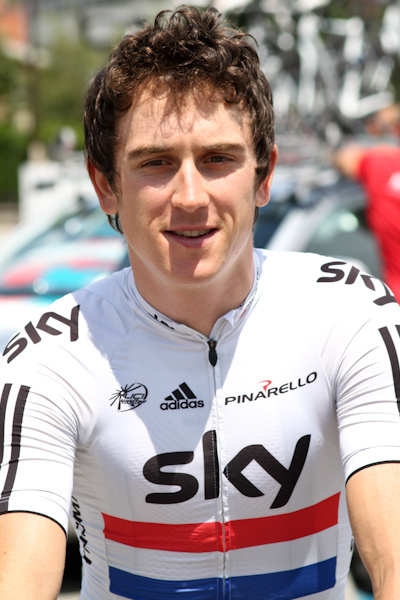
Thomas wearing the National Road Race Champion's jersey in 2011

Thomas started 2011 with some promising performances in the classics, finishing sixth in the Classica Sarda and second in the Dwars door Vlaanderen before placing tenth in the Tour of Flanders Thomas claimed his first professional victory in May, by winning the five-day Bayern Rundfahrt race, after finishing second on stage 3 and fifth on stage 4. On 26 June 2011, Thomas finished second to Bradley Wiggins in the British National Road Race Championships.

At the Tour de France, Thomas finished sixth on the opening stage to take the white jersey. He retained the jersey the following day, as Sky finished third in the team time trial. Thomas lost the white jersey to Robert Gesink on stage 7, as team leader Bradley Wiggins crashed out of the Tour, and the remaining Sky riders lost time after waiting for him. Thomas won the combativity award on the 212 km (132 mi) stage 12, following an aggressive breakaway 2 kilometres (1.2 miles) into the first Pyrenean stage, that saw him lose control twice on the descent of La Hourquette d'Ancizan. He finished 36th on the stage after being caught by the general classification leaders with 7 kilometres (4.3 miles) to go on the final climb of the day, and rose to 25th overall. Thomas signed a new three-year contract with Sky after stage 16. He finished 31st overall in the Tour.

Thomas had a successful Tour of Britain, winning the points classification, having been highly placed in the overall standings before a crash. He was part of the Great Britain team for the road race at the UCI Road World Championships, and helped lead out Mark Cavendish to victory.

=== 2012: second gold ===
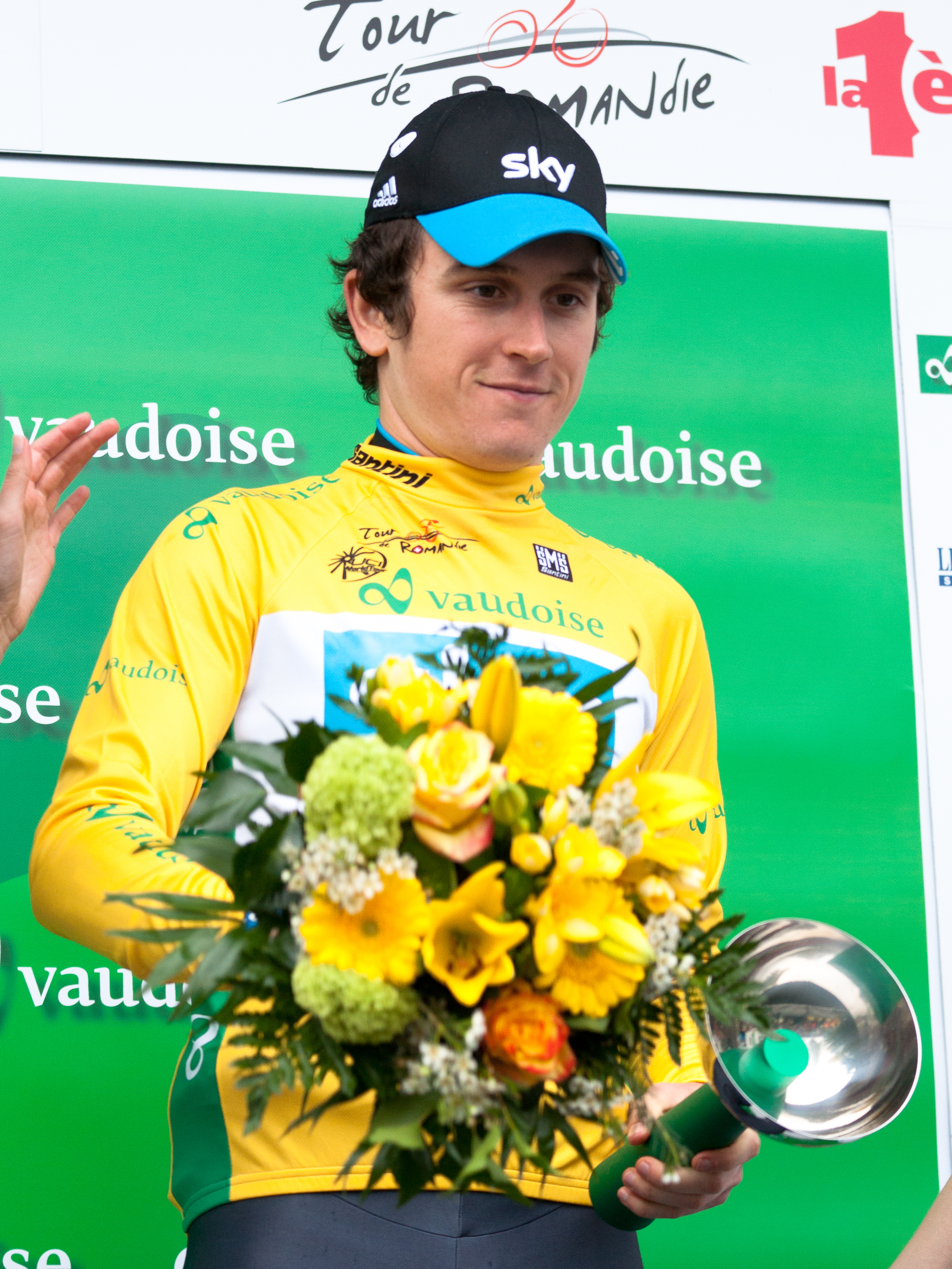
Thomas at the 2012 Tour de Romandie, wearing the leader's jersey after winning the prologue

Thomas focused on track cycling for the 2012 season, competing at the Summer Olympics in London. As such, the Giro d'Italia was his road race priority, before turning his focus to the track. In March, Thomas did ride Paris–Nice, where he helped Bradley Wiggins take overall victory. On 4 April Thomas was a member of the British team pursuit team that won gold at the UCI Track Cycling World Championships in Melbourne, with a new world record of 3:53.295 seconds. He also teamed up with Ben Swift to take the silver medal in the madison. Thomas then returned to the road, winning the prologue of the Tour de Romandie.

Thomas finished second behind Taylor Phinney in the opening time trial of the Giro d'Italia. Thomas acted as lead out man to Mark Cavendish in the race, helping him to three stage victories. Thomas also finished second to Marco Pinotti in the final stage time trial in Milan.

Thomas was selected for the team pursuit team for the Olympics, along with Steven Burke, Ed Clancy and Peter Kennaugh. On 2 August the quartet set a new world record of 3:52.499 in the first heat of the event. The team set the fastest time in the first round, setting up a final with Australia to decide the gold medal winners. In the final, the British team set another world record of 3:51.659, finishing nearly three seconds ahead of the Australians, with Thomas retaining his gold medal in the event.

=== 2013 ===
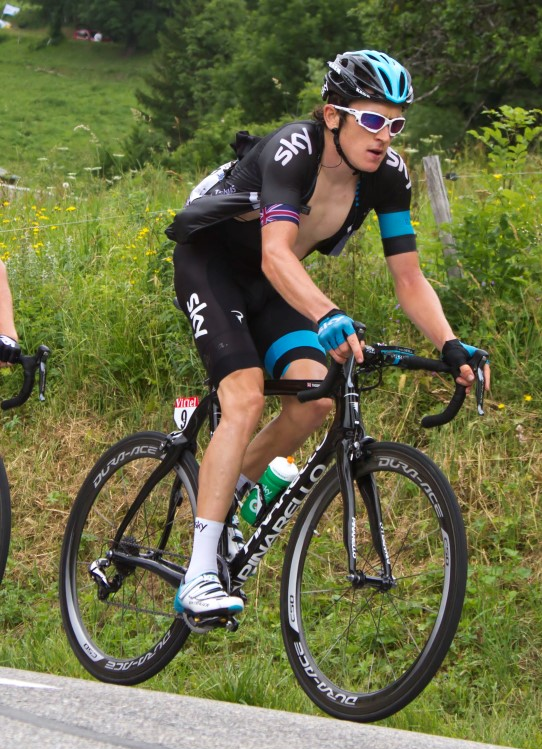
Thomas at the 2013 Tour de France

Thomas began the 2013 season at the Tour Down Under. He won stage 2 after attacking on the Corkscrew climb, and outsprinting three riders that had joined him on the descent. Thomas held the race lead until the penultimate stage, where he cracked on Old Willunga Hill and dropped to fifth overall. However, he fought back on the final stage in Adelaide, taking enough bonus seconds to rise to third place overall, 25 seconds behind Dutch rider Tom-Jelte Slagter, and won the sprints classification.

Thomas was given a leadership role in Sky's Classics campaign. His best results were a couple of fourth places in Omloop Het Nieuwsblad and E3 Harelbeke, as he crashed out of contention in Milan–San Remo, the Tour of Flanders and Paris–Roubaix. After a break, Thomas returned to action at the Bayern Rundfahrt, where he finished second overall. He showed excellent climbing form at the Critérium du Dauphiné, helping Chris Froome and Richie Porte secure a 1–2 overall finish, whilst also placing 15th overall himself.

He was selected to ride the Tour de France, but crashed heavily on the opening stage. Thomas started the next stage but struggled, finishing second last and after returning to hospital was found to have a fractured pelvis. Despite his injury, Thomas continued, and managed to finish the Tour in 140th place, helping Froome take overall victory.

=== 2014 ===
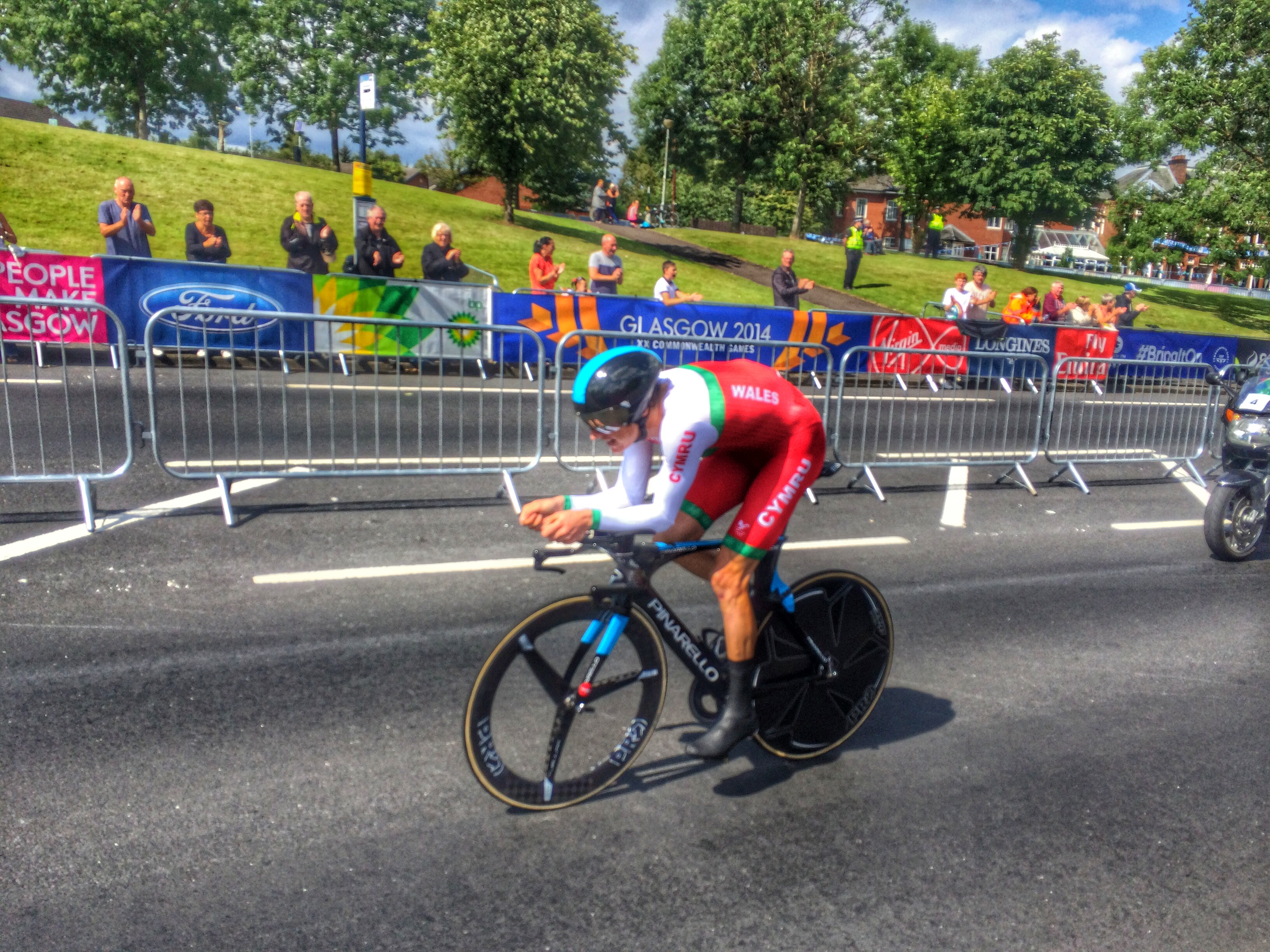
Thomas competing in the road time trial at the 2014 Commonwealth Games, where he took the bronze medal

Thomas once again started the season at the Tour Down Under, this time riding in support of Richie Porte, and finishing eighth overall. Thomas was again scheduled to support Porte at Paris–Nice, but an injury to Froome meant that Porte was switched to Tirreno–Adriatico, leaving Thomas to lead the squad in France. Thomas performed strongly, finishing second to Garmin–Sharp's Tom-Jelte Slagter on the fourth stage, to take the leader's yellow jersey, before dropping to second behind Carlos Betancur on the sixth stage. The next day however, Thomas hit a tree on a descent 5 km (3.1 mi) from the finish; although he would complete the stage some seven minutes in arrears, Thomas did not start the final stage. Thomas recovered to take his good form into the Classics season, finishing third in E3 Harelbeke. He led Team Sky at the Tour of Flanders and managed an eighth-place finish, 37 seconds behind the winning rider, Fabian Cancellara, having had to chase back after being dropped on the Taaienberg climb. Thomas also secured a hard-fought seventh position in Paris–Roubaix, finishing as part of a group twenty seconds behind solo winner Niki Terpstra having been active in an earlier break with Tom Boonen.

In May, Thomas won the overall classification at Bayern Rundfahrt for the second time in his career, after winning the individual time trial on Stage 4.

In the Tour de France, Thomas acted as a domestique to Sky teammate Richie Porte, following the withdrawal of his compatriot Chris Froome on stage five. Porte soon fell down the overall standings after suffering badly on stage thirteen to Chamrousse. Thomas was then given the freedom to go for stage wins and appeared in a number of breakaways. Thomas was the only Briton to finish the race, placing 22nd overall, his best ever result in the Tour de France.

Thomas represented Wales at the Commonwealth Games in Glasgow. He won bronze in the individual time trial behind Alex Dowsett of England and Rohan Dennis of Australia. Thomas won gold in the road race after attacking Scott Thwaites and Jack Bauer on the final lap of the Glasgow city centre circuit, and built up a large enough gap to survive a scare when he had to change a wheel in the closing stages. Thomas rounded off his season with sixth overall at the Eneco Tour in August.

In December, Thomas was voted the BBC Wales Sports Personality of the Year.

=== 2015 ===
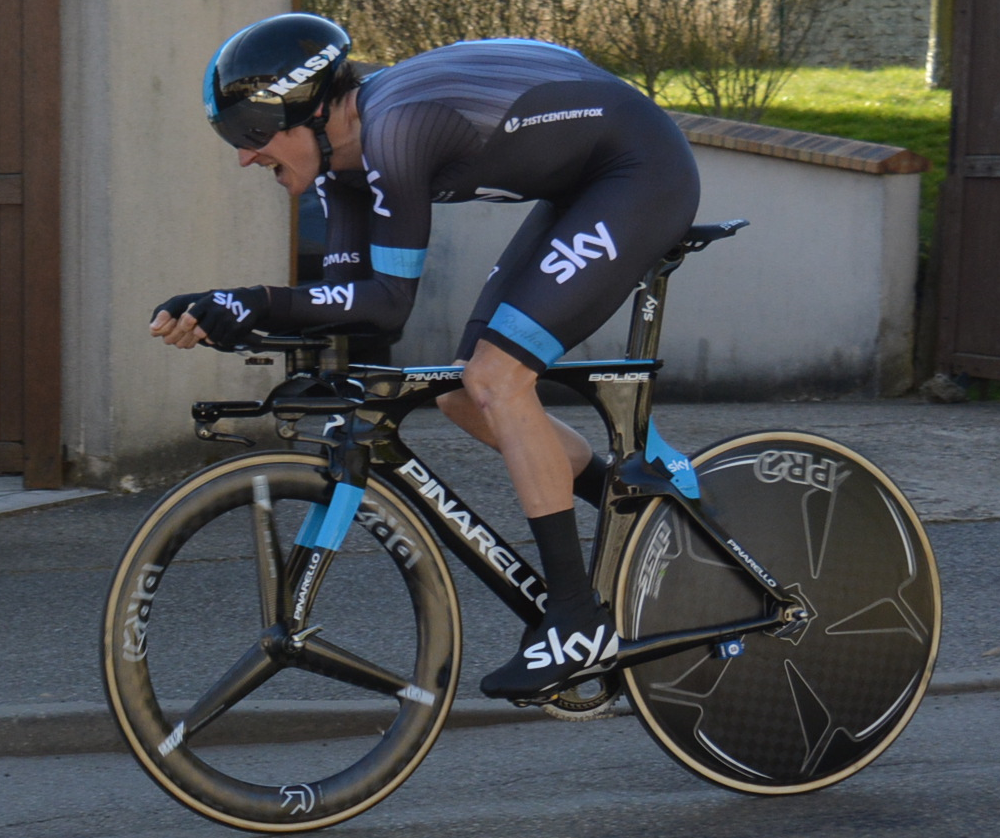
Thomas in the prologue of the 2015 Paris–Nice

In February 2015 Thomas won the second stage of the Volta ao Algarve after following an attack by Rein Taaramäe (Astana) on the final climb of the day, before going clear and holding off the chasers on the descent to the finish, 19 seconds ahead of the Estonian and 23 seconds ahead of the peloton to take the race lead. He defended the lead by placing third in the time trial on stage 3, and fourth on stage 4, which finished on the summit of the Alto do Malhão and was won by teammate Richie Porte. He finished safely on the final stage to claim overall victory.

Short video taken in 2015

Thomas's next race was Paris–Nice. He took second place on the race's queen stage to the Col de la Croix de Chaubouret, again behind Porte. He lost time on the penultimate stage of the race, after crashing on a wet descent, but continued and finished fifth in the overall standings. The following week, he took part in the Milan–San Remo. He attacked on several occasions during the race, most significantly on the descent of the Cipressa. Although he led the race solo over the top of the Poggio, he was caught soon afterwards and finished just behind the front group. Five days later, Thomas became the first British rider to win the E3 Harelbeke, attacking from a 3-man breakaway with Zdeněk Štybar (Etixx–Quick-Step) and Peter Sagan (Tinkoff–Saxo) in the closing stages and holding on to triumph. Two days later Thomas finished third in Gent–Wevelgem behind Luca Paolini (Team Katusha) and Niki Terpstra (Etixx–Quick-Step), despite being blown off his bike and crashing due to a gust of wind in extreme weather conditions.

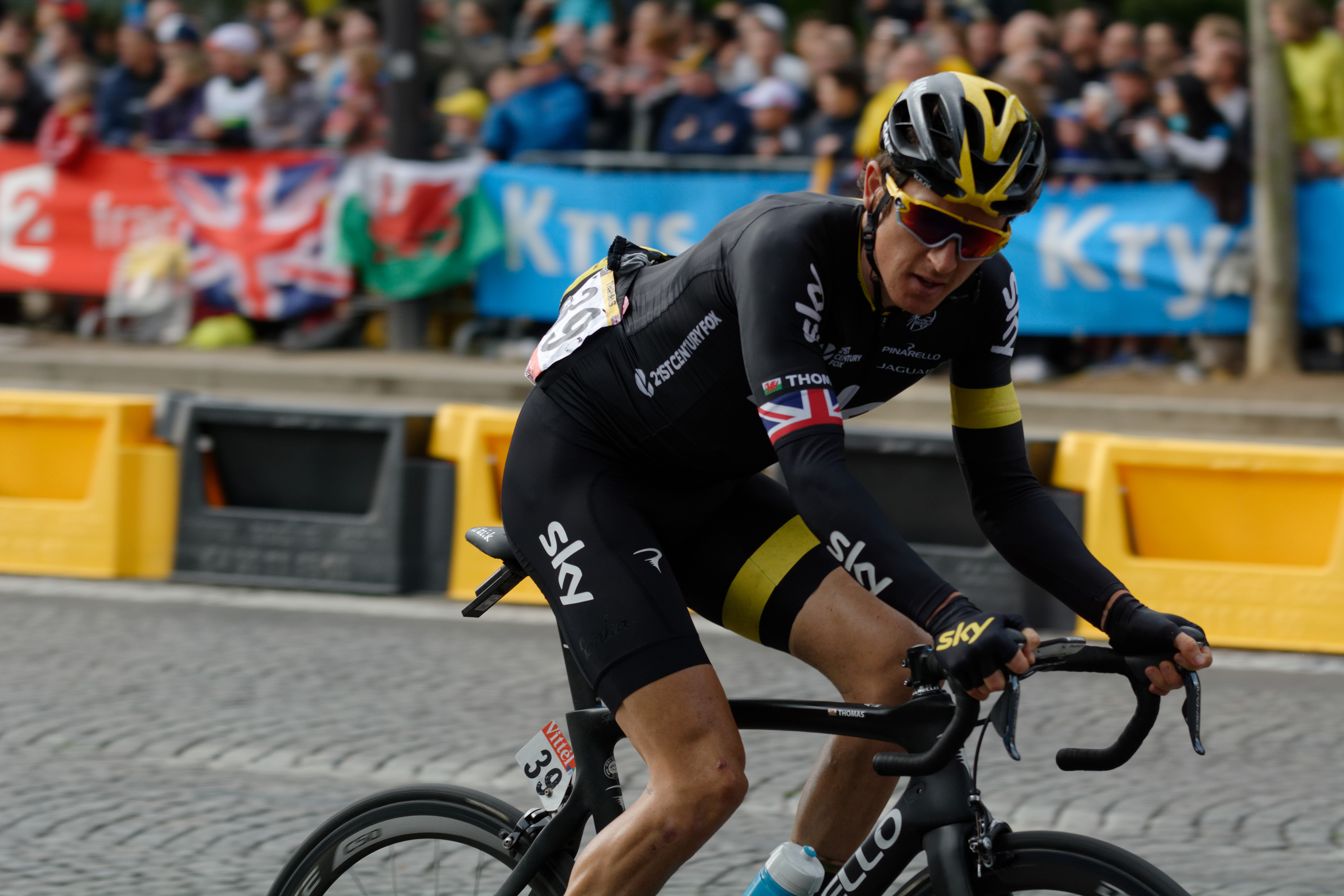
Thomas on the final stage of the 2015 Tour de France, wearing a one-off kit to celebrate Chris Froome's overall victory

In June, Thomas produced one of the best climbing performances of his career at the Tour de Suisse by finishing fifth on stage 5, which finished with a climb to the Rettenbach glacier to an altitude of 2,669 m (8,757 ft) with the last 12.1 km (7.5 mi) featured an average gradient of 10.7%. Thomas placed fifth in the concluding time trial on stage 9, missing out on overall victory by a gap of five seconds to Simon Špilak (Team Katusha).

At the Tour de France Thomas played a support role for Chris Froome, helping him navigate a first week featuring crosswinds, hill top finishes, cobblestones and a team time trial. On the first mountain stage in the Pyrenees, Thomas helped set up Froome's winning attack by reducing the peloton on the final climb, the Col de la Pierre St Martin and placed sixth on the stage alongside Alejandro Valverde of the Movistar Team. This result meant Thomas rose to fifth overall on the general classification. He dropped down to sixth after finishing just over half a minute behind Alberto Contador on stage 14 from Rodez to Mende. On stage 16, Warren Barguil (Team Giant–Alpecin) lost control approaching a hairpin bend the descent of the Col de Manse and collided with Thomas, causing him to crash head first into a telegraph pole and fall into a ditch. However Thomas escaped serious injury, and was able to complete the stage and lost just 38 seconds to the leading group. He subsequently moved up to fourth overall after stage 17 to Pra-Loup, when Tejay van Garderen pulled out of the race due to illness and Contador lost time due to a crash. However he struggled on stage 19's climb up La Toussuire, finishing 22 minutes behind stage winner Vincenzo Nibali and sliding down to 15th place in the general classification, 27 minutes and 24 seconds off Froome.

In August he was named in the start list for the Vuelta a España.

=== 2016: Paris–Nice victory ===
In February 2016, Thomas retained his Volta ao Algarve title, after placing fifth on the decisive fifth stage behind Alberto Contador.

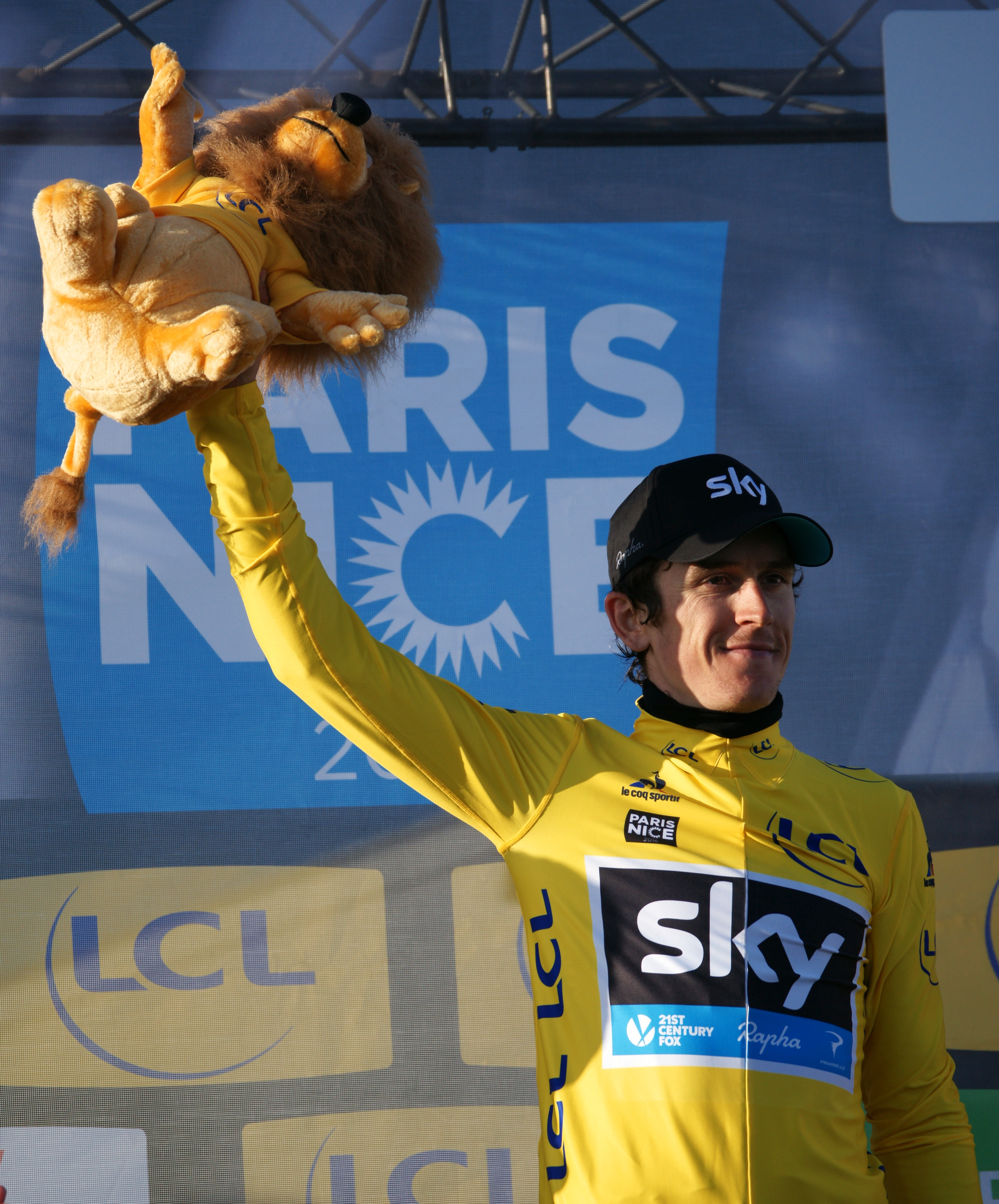
Thomas at the 2016 Paris–Nice, a race that he won

In March 2016, Thomas led Team Sky at Paris–Nice. On stage 6, Thomas finished second to Ilnur Zakarin (Team Katusha) on a mountain top finish at Madone d'Utelle to take the race lead by 15 seconds over Contador. Thomas was able to defend his lead on the final stage, with assistance from teammate Sergio Henao, after Contador repeatedly attacked and distanced Thomas on the final climb of the Col d'Èze. Thomas crossed the finish line in Nice 11 seconds after Contador to win the race by 4 seconds.

In May 2016, it was reported that Thomas had signed a two-year contract extension keeping him at Sky until the end of 2018 season. However the following month he clarified that the contract was for one year with the option of a further year.

In July 2016 Thomas was part of the Team Sky squad at the Tour de France that aided Chris Froome in securing his third Tour de France overall win. Thomas finished 15th overall for the second year in succession.

Thomas was selected to ride the Olympic Road Race. He crashed on the final descent, around 10 kilometres (6.2 miles) from the finish of the race, when he was near the front of the race in and with a chance of contesting the finale. Thomas re-mounted, and managed to finish in 11th place two and a half minutes adrift of gold medallist Greg Van Avermaet (Belgium). Thomas also received a late entry for the Olympic time trial and finished 9th.

=== 2017 ===
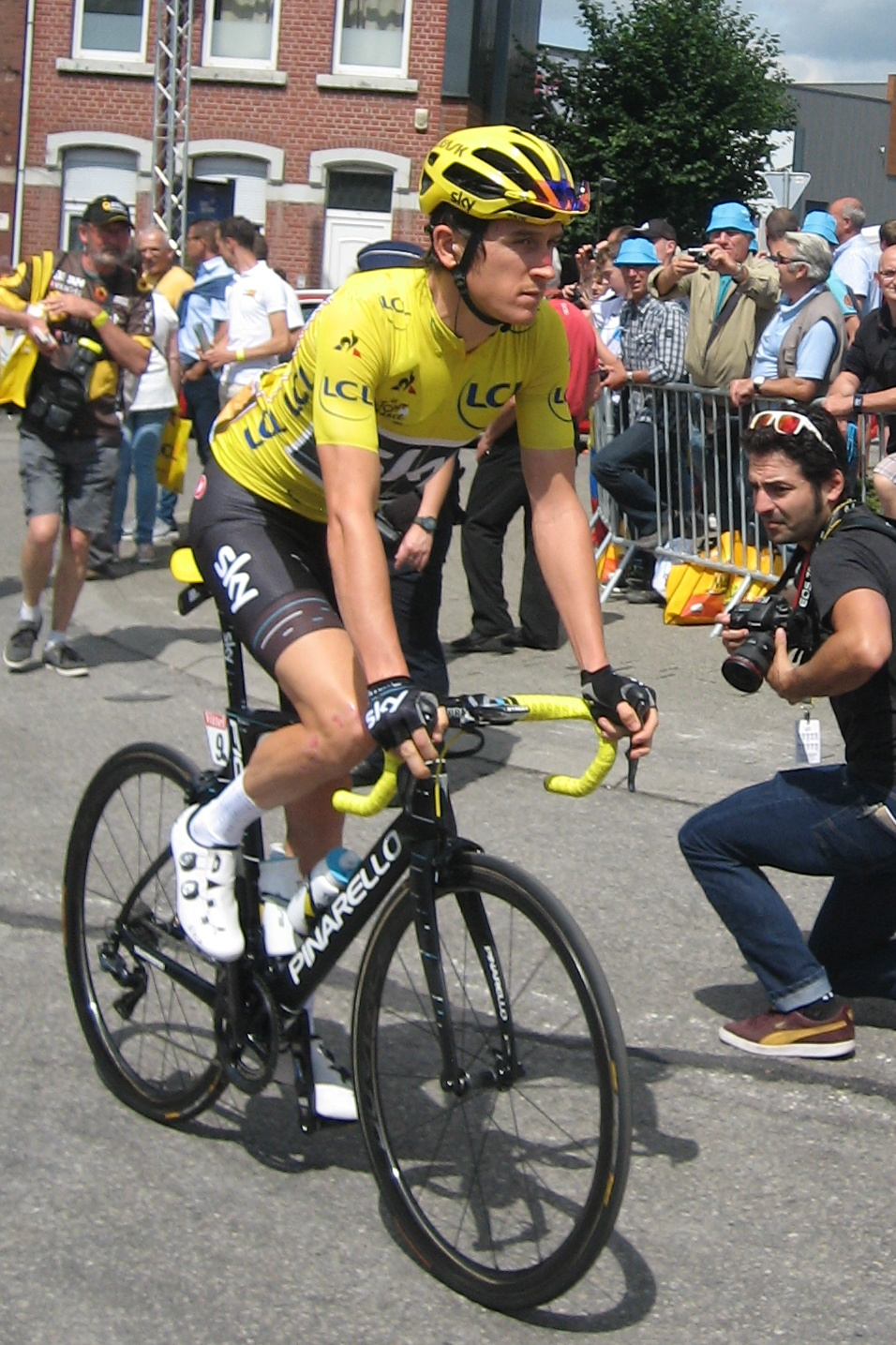
At the 2017 Tour de France, Thomas took the race leader's yellow jersey after he won the opening stage.

In January 2017, Team Sky announced that Thomas would share leadership with Mikel Landa at the Giro d'Italia.

In March 2017, Thomas led Sky at Tirreno–Adriatico. However, their opening team time trial was marred by a crash suffered by Gianni Moscon, when his front wheel disintegrated at high speed. Moscon fell to the tarmac, suffering abrasions, but was able to remount. After the stage, Thomas stated to the media that two other team members suffered broken wheels during the stage; Team Sky ultimately finished 1 minute, 41 seconds down on the time of the BMC Racing Team. On stage 2, with 5.5 kilometres (3.4 miles) remaining, Thomas and Quick-Step Floors's Bob Jungels attacked on the 16% steep climb towards Pomarance, pulling Tim Wellens (Lotto–Soudal), and BMC Racing Team duo Tejay van Garderen and Damiano Caruso – in the leader's blue jersey – away with them. With Thomas pulling clear of Jungels, Nairo Quintana (Movistar Team) countered to the group of pursuers; Thomas was able to stay clear until the end, winning the stage by nine seconds from Tom Dumoulin of Team Sunweb. Thomas finished second on stage 4 to Monte Terminillo, 18 seconds behind Nairo Quintana of (Movistar Team). He finished fifth overall, 58 seconds behind Quintana.

In April 2017, Thomas became the first British rider to win the Tour of the Alps (formerly known as the Giro del Trentino). Thomas won the third stage of the race, taking the leader's fuchsia jersey as a result, and ultimately won by seven seconds ahead of Thibaut Pinot (FDJ). Thomas began the Giro d'Italia strongly, finishing third on stage 4 to Mount Etna to sit second overall for the rest of the first week. However, on stage 9, as the peloton approached the final climb of the day to Blockhaus, Wilco Kelderman of Team Sunweb collided with a police motorcycle which had been parked at the side of the road. This caused him to swerve to his right into the Sky riders, who were in a line in the peloton, and resulted in Thomas and the majority of his teammates being brought down. Thomas reported his shoulder "popped out" during the crash, but he remounted to complete the stage, dropping to 17th in the standings, five minutes and 14 seconds behind Nairo Quintana. After a rest day, Thomas recovered to finish second to Tom Dumoulin on stage 10, a 39.8 km (24.7 mi) individual time trial, to move back up to 11th overall. However, after losing further time on the next two stages, Thomas withdrew from the race with a worsening knee injury.

At the Tour de France, Thomas won the opening stage, a 13.7 km (8.5 mi) individual time trial, making him the first Welsh rider to wear the yellow jersey in the event. He held the yellow jersey until Stage 5, when he dropped to second overall behind teammate Chris Froome after finishing tenth on La Planche des Belles Filles. Thomas crashed out of the race on a descent on Stage 9 whilst placed second overall and suffered a broken collarbone.

=== 2018: Tour de France victory ===
Thomas began his 2018 season in February at the Volta ao Algarve, where he won the 20.3-kilometre (12.6-mile) individual time trial on Stage 3 to increase his overall race lead. However, he missed out on overall victory on the final stage when a 31-man breakaway went clear in the opening kilometres including his teammate, the second placed rider Michał Kwiatkowski. Kwiatkowski held on to win the stage on the Malhão to take overall victory by 1 minute 31 seconds over Thomas. In March, Thomas again suffered misfortune whilst leading Tirreno–Adriatico when on Stage 4 he suffered a mechanical issue 1.5 kilometres (0.93 miles) from the summit of the final climb to Sarnano–Sassotetto that saw him lose 34 seconds and the overall leader's blue jersey. He eventually finished third overall, again behind teammate Kwiatkowski and Damiano Caruso of BMC Racing Team. In April, Thomas returned to Paris–Roubaix, but abandoned after crashing in the opening cobbled sector of the race.

In June, Thomas led Team Sky at the 2018 Critérium du Dauphiné in the absence of Chris Froome, who had won the Giro d'Italia a week earlier. Thomas crashed during the opening prologue and finished over 20 seconds down on Kwiatkowski, who won the stage. Team Sky won the team time trial on Stage 3 with Thomas rising to fourth overall. Thomas took the race lead after finishing second on Stage 5 to Valmorel and increased his lead over Adam Yates to 1 minute 29 seconds on the following stage. Despite having to chase back twice after suffering two punctures on the final stage, Thomas held on to take overall victory ahead of Yates and Romain Bardet (AG2R La Mondiale).

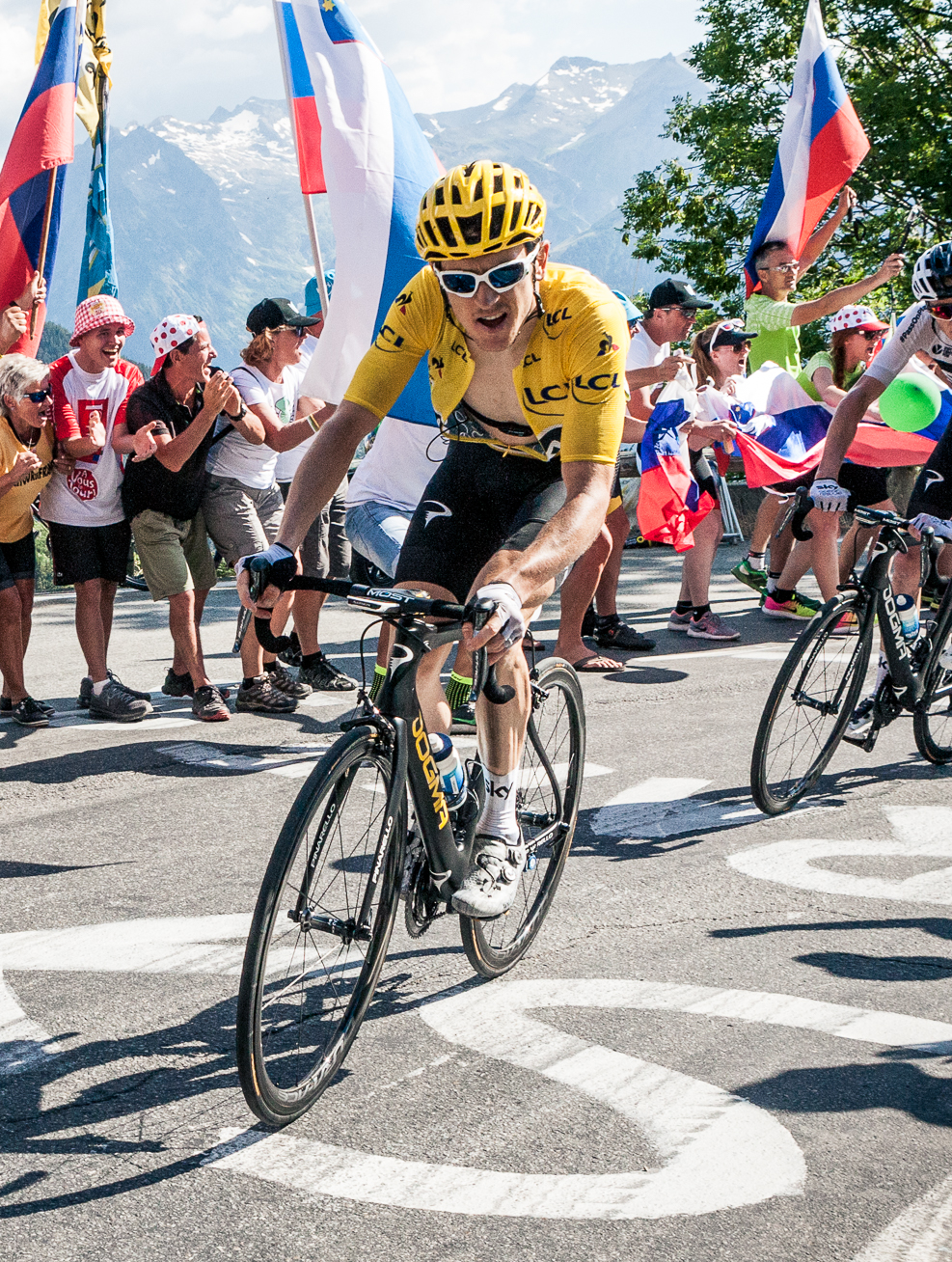
Thomas wearing the yellow jersey on stage 12 of the 2018 Tour de France

In July, Thomas entered the Tour de France as a domestique riding in support of Team Sky's leader Froome, who was going for a record-equalling fifth Tour de France victory, even as Thomas was one of the top contenders who could compete for the overall victory. A crash for Froome on stage 1 saw him lose time to Thomas and Team Sky finished second behind BMC Racing Team in the second stage team time trial. After avoiding the crashes and mechanical problems suffered by many of the other overall contenders in the first week, Thomas sat second overall when the race entered the Alps on Stage 10, just 43 seconds behind the leader Greg Van Avermaet, whilst Froome was in eighth place. and speculation over team leadership began, though Thomas himself diplomatically fielded any questions regarding leadership: "I think it's early to be talking about that", Thomas said about any disputes over leadership between him and Froome. "Maybe if I'm still right there after Alpe d'Huez [on stage 12], it's a bit different than. But we haven't even done a proper climb yet. I'm certainly not getting carried away".

On Stage 11, with a steep finishing climb to La Rosière, Thomas attacked from the group of favourites, including Froome, 6 kilometres (3.7 miles) from the finish and caught up with Tom Dumoulin (Team Sunweb), who had attacked on the stage's penultimate climb. Thomas attacked again in the final kilometre to distance Dumoulin, and he passed lone breakaway rider Mikel Nieve (Mitchelton–Scott) in sight of the finish line to take the stage win and the race leader's yellow jersey. The following day, Thomas won Stage 12 in a sprint finish at Alpe d'Huez ahead of Dumoulin and Froome, who arose as the likely contenders for overall victory in Paris. By doing so he became the first rider to win a Tour de France stage at Alpe d'Huez in the yellow jersey and the first British winner at Alpe d'Huez in the Tour de France.

On Stage 17, the first of the three Pyrenean stages, a 65-kilometre (40-mile) stage to the summit of the Col de Portet, Thomas extended his lead by placing third behind stage winner Nairo Quintana of Movistar Team. Froome's challenge faded on the approach to the summit and he dropped to third position in the general classification, 2:31 behind Thomas. Dumoulin moved into second place, 1:59 off the lead. On the mountainous stage nineteen from Lourdes to Laruns, Primož Roglič of LottoNL–Jumbo attacked on the final climb, the Col d'Aubisque, and soloed to the finish nineteen seconds ahead of the chasing group of overall favourites. Thomas was able to consolidate his position in the yellow jersey by picking up six bonus seconds in the sprint thereby extending his lead over Dumoulin to 2 minutes, 5 seconds. The penultimate stage was a 31 km (19.3 mi) time trial, Dumoulin won the stage, one second ahead of Froome. Thomas survived a scare when his back wheel locked, but completed the time trial successfully, finishing fourteen seconds behind Dumoulin, taking a lead of 1 minute, 51 seconds into the final stage. He held the lead all the way to Paris to become only the third ever British, first British-born and first Welsh cyclist to win the Tour de France.

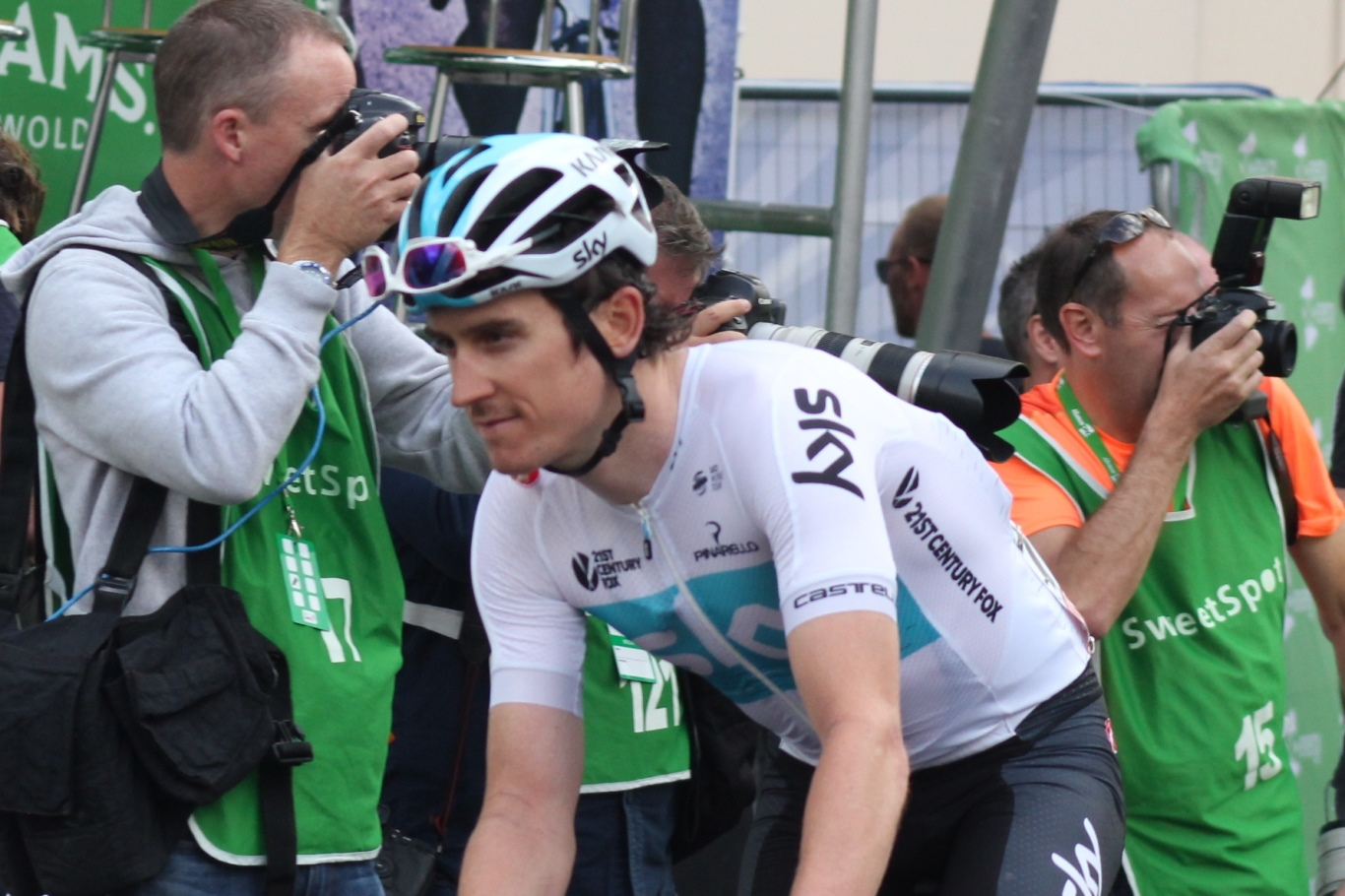
Thomas at the 2018 Tour of Britain

On 9 August, Thomas attended a homecoming event organised in Cardiff in his honour, appearing in front of 3,000 people outside the Senedd in Cardiff Bay where he was greeted by First Minister of Wales Carwyn Jones before riding alongside a group of young riders to Cardiff Castle, where a crowd of 8,000 heard him speak. In September 2018 the Wales National Velodrome in Newport was officially renamed the Geraint Thomas National Velodrome: Thomas attended the renaming ceremony after the first stage of the 2018 Tour of Britain finished in the city.

In December, Thomas was named BBC Wales Sports Personality of the Year for the second time, before he went on to win the main BBC Sports Personality of the Year Award. He was appointed Officer of the Order of the British Empire (OBE) in the 2019 New Year Honours for services to cycling.

=== 2019: tour runner-up ===
After celebrating his 2018 Tour victory, Thomas was overweight at the start of the 2019 season. His only result of note before the Tour was a third-place overall finish at the Tour de Romandie in early May.

In June, Thomas abandoned the Tour de Suisse following a crash, and required recovery time, which put his ability to perform at the Tour in doubt. His Ineos teammate Egan Bernal went on to win the race. Thomas and Bernal were named as joint team leaders for the 2019 Tour de France, after Chris Froome was ruled out of the race after suffering a serious crash at the Critérium du Dauphiné although some in the media expected an internal battle between the two. Bernal had been planned to lead his team's Giro squad, but missed the race after he broke his collarbone. His major wins of the season up to the Tour were the Paris–Nice stage race before his injury and the Tour de Suisse on his return.

On Stage 2, Ineos placed second behind Team Jumbo–Visma in a team time trial. Team INEOS. On Stage 3, Deceuninck–Quick-Step rider Julian Alaphilippe launched a solo attack with 16 km (9.9 mi) to go over the final climb, the third-category Côte de Mutigny, catching and passing the remainder of the breakaway to win the stage and take the yellow jersey. The tenth stage was on relatively flat terrain. With 30 km (18.6 mi) remaining, splits occurred in the peloton as Team INEOS and others took to the front and broke the field apart in strong crosswinds. This effort proved decisive, as several overall contenders who were caught behind, including Thibaut Pinot, Richie Porte, Rigoberto Urán, Jakob Fuglsang and Mikel Landa, lost time on the front group. Thomas, Bernal, Alaphilippe maintained their position at the front of the race, amongst a reduced bunch. By the first rest day, the general classification was led by Alaphilippe, who had a lead of 1' 12" on Thomas, behind whom was Bernal in third place, just 4" from Thomas.

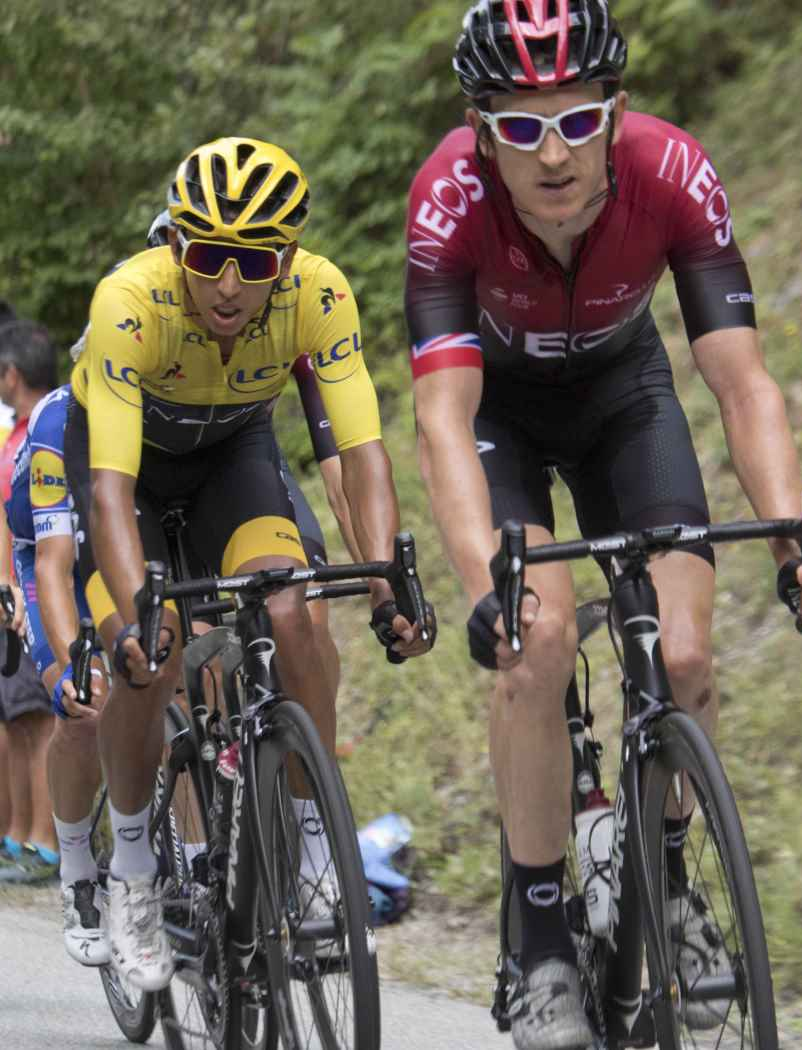
Thomas leading Team INEOS teammate and eventual 2019 Tour winner Egan Bernal on the penultimate stage

On Stage 13, an individual time trial to Pau, Alaphilippe took the victory to extend his lead, with a time of 35' 00" across the 27.2 km (17 mi) course, achieving a victory on a day where he was expected to lose time to riders such as Thomas, who ended up in second place, fourteen seconds down. On stage 14, the last of the breakaway riders were caught by the leading group of general classification contenders at 10 km (6.2 mi) before the finish atop the hors catégorie Col du Tourmalet. With 1 km (0.62 mi) remaining, Thomas got detached from the lead group containing Alaphilippe, Emanuel Buchmann, Pinot, Bernal, Landa and Steven Kruijswijk. Pinot attacked in the final 250 m (270 yd) and held his lead to the finish line at the summit. On the final stage in the Pyrenees, Simon Yates took his second stage win of the race from a reduced breakaway of six at the summit of the 11.8 km (7.3 mi) first-category climb to Prat d'Albis. Pinot attacked the group of general classification contenders with 6 km (3.7 mi) remaining to finish in second place with Landa, 33 seconds behind, progressing to fourth overall. The duo of Bernal and Buchmann came in 33' down, followed by the last few breakaway riders, and then the group of favourites, led by Thomas, who finished 1' 22" behind Yates. The following day was the Tour's second rest day. By this point, overall race leader Alaphilippe was exceeding expectations, with a 1' 35" lead over Thomas. Kruijswijk was third at 1' 47", followed by Pinot, Bernal and Buchmann respectively.

Stage 18, the first in the Alps, was led by breakaway riders throughout the stage's climbs, which included the first-category Col de Vars and the hors catégorie Col d'Izoard and Col du Galibier. With 2 km (1.2 mi) remaining of the Galibier, Bernal attacked from within the group of general classification contenders containing Alaphilippe and Thomas, allowing Bernal to recover half a minute on his rivals by the finish and move up to second overall. Around 40 km (25 mi) into stage 19, Pinot, who had been placed fifth in the general classification, abandoned the race with a leg muscle injury. At the head of the race in the closing kilometres of the planned second to last climb, the hors catégorie Col de l'Iseran, Bernal attacked from the group of overall contenders, catching and passing final breakaway riders by the summit. Alaphilippe was dropped following Bernal's attack, and was two minutes behind at the summit. During the descent, the race was neutralised when a hailstorm caused ice and landslides to block the route to the final climb to Tignes, particularly a mudslide at the foot of the descent before Val-d'Isère. Times for the general classification were taken at the summit of the Iseran, with the stage victory and most combative rider of the day not awarded. As a result, Bernal, who had been in second place overall, moved ahead of Alaphilippe and took the yellow jersey. The stage was shortened from 126.5 km (79 mi) to 89 km (55 mi). The inclement weather also caused the penultimate stage to be reduced in length beforehand, from 130 km (81 mi) to 59.5 km (37 mi), bypassing the first-category Cormet de Roselend and the second-category Côte de Longefoy, with the only climb being the hors catégorie-rated one to Val Thorens at the finish. A group of 29 riders established a two-and-a-half minute lead over the peloton, before being vastly reduced to six on the early slopes of the Val Thorens climb. With 12 km (7.5 mi) remaining, Nibali attacked from this group and soloed to victory, ten seconds ahead of chasers Landa and Alejandro Valverde. Close behind, Bernal and Thomas led the other general classification contenders Urán, Buchmann and Kruijswijk. Alaphilippe was dropped again, losing three minutes to Bernal and dropping from second overall to fifth. Thomas therefore finished the race in second place overall, 1' 11" down on Bernal.

=== 2020 ===
After a year disrupted by the COVID-19 pandemic, Thomas did not ride the Tour de France, after a mutual decision with his team, instead focusing his efforts on the Giro d'Italia. He entered September's Tirreno–Adriatico, ahead of the Giro d'Italia the following month. He finished second to compatriot Simon Yates on the fifth stage, which finished at the Sassotetto ski resort; he ultimately finished the race in second overall, behind Yates. In between Tirreno–Adriatico and the Giro d'Italia, Thomas made his first appearance in the time trial at the UCI Road World Championships, finishing 4th. A crash on the third stage of the Giro d'Italia fractured his pelvis, and ended his season. The race was eventually won by his domestique, compatriot and teammate Tao Geoghegan Hart.

=== 2021 ===
In the Volta a Catalunya, Thomas finished third overall, behind INEOS Grenadiers teammates Adam Yates and Richie Porte. He then won the Tour de Romandie on the final day, moving ahead of Michael Woods, before finishing third at the 2021 Critérium du Dauphiné, winning the fifth stage. During the Tour de France he, along with many other riders, ran into crashes and bad luck during the first week. He did finish the Tour, finishing 41st overall while riding in support of Richard Carapaz, who took the final podium place.

=== 2022: third Tour podium and stage race success ===
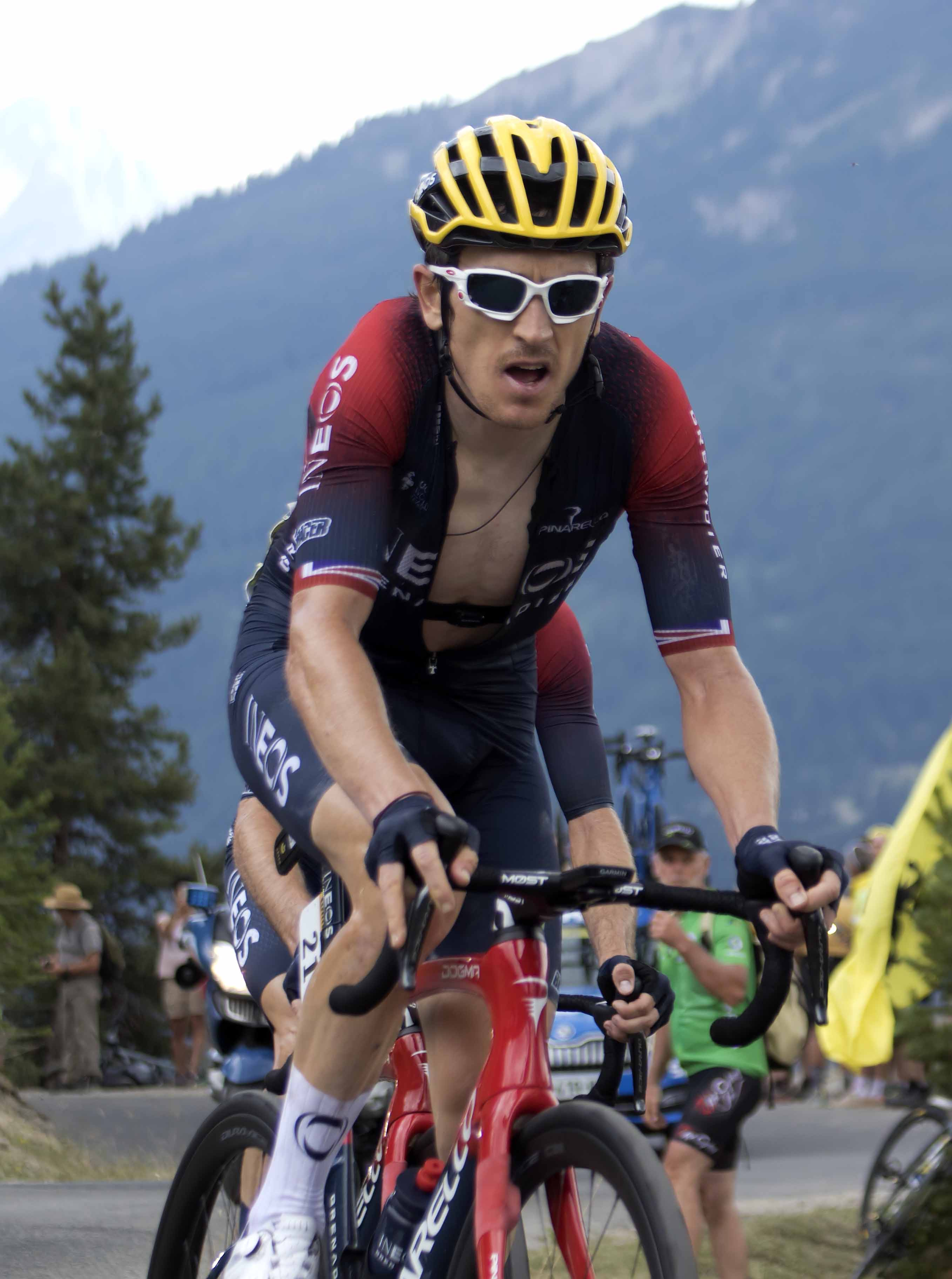
Thomas at the 2022 Tour de France

At the Tour de Suisse, he was part of an INEOS Grenadiers team that included Adam Yates, Daniel Martínez and Tom Pidcock. After gaining bonus seconds on the third stage, he trailed race leader Aleksandr Vlasov by seven seconds after the fifth stage. Following Vlasov's positive COVID-19 test ahead of the sixth stage, Thomas moved up to second overall, one second behind Jakob Fuglsang. Both were overhauled by Sergio Higuita on the seventh stage, with Higuita leading Thomas by two seconds going into the final individual time trial stage in Liechtenstein. Thomas finished second on the day to Remco Evenepoel, with Higuita finishing more than a minute down, which gave Thomas the overall victory.

Thomas rode the Tour de France for the twelfth time, with Yates, Martínez and Pidcock also part of the INEOS Grenadiers octet. Thomas proved himself to be the strongest rider in the race, except for Jonas Vingegaard and Tadej Pogačar, and by the Pyrenees was the only rider left within striking distance of the two. Between the Alps and the Pyrenees there was rumours that Pogačar sought an alliance with Thomas, to which Thomas refuted the suggestion of such. Into the third week he was finally distanced by Vingegaard and Pogačar, while being well ahead of the remainder of the peloton in the Pyrenees and he rode well enough to put himself in position to finish on a Tour podium for the third time. His strong performance during the final individual time trial made him the only rider to finish within ten minutes of Vingegaard and Pogačar on the road, and secured his podium position.

At the Commonwealth Games, he earned Wales a bronze medal in the road time trial, despite an early crash costing him almost half a minute.

=== 2023 Giro d'Italia runner-up ===
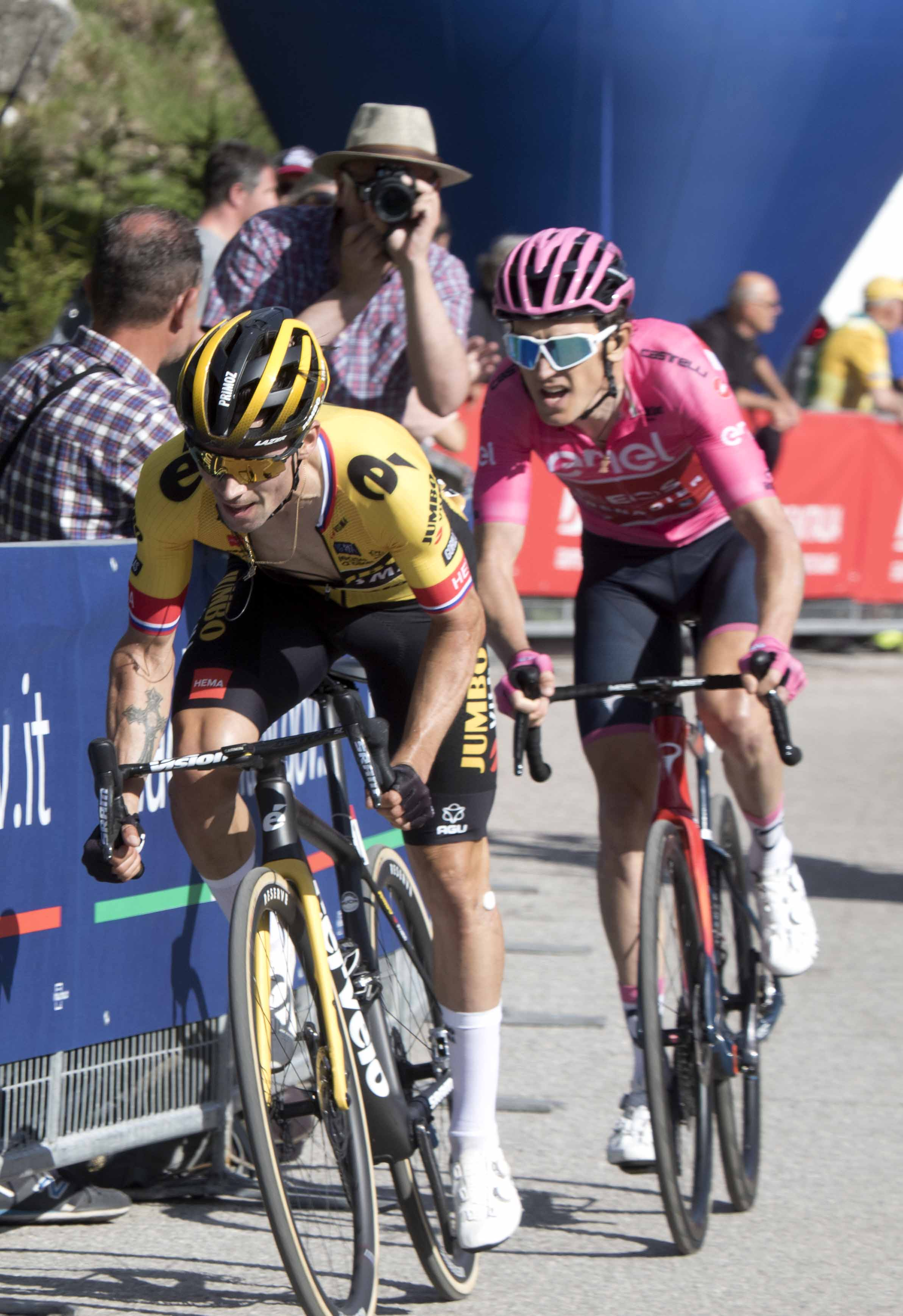
Thomas (right) wearing the maglia rosa riding with Primož Roglič (left) at the 2023 Giro d'Italia

Thomas was one of the co-leaders for the INEOS Grenadiers at the Giro d'Italia, along with Tao Geoghegan Hart. Having started the race with a ninth-place finish on the opening individual time trial, Thomas remained in the top-ten placings in the general classification for the entire race. He moved up to second overall by the first rest day (occurring after the ninth stage), behind only Remco Evenepoel. Thomas assumed the race lead following a positive COVID-19 test for Evenepoel, a lead he held for four stages, before Bruno Armirail assumed the pink jersey after the peloton lost more than twenty minutes on stage fourteen. Thomas retook the race lead two stages later after Armirail cracked on the final climb to Monte Bondone. Heading into the third individual time trial of the race, held on the penultimate day, Thomas held a 26-second lead over Primož Roglič, with João Almeida also within a minute. Roglič lost time with a mechanical issue early on the climb of Monte Lussari, but ultimately overhauled the advantage held by Thomas, with Roglič prevailing by 40 seconds on the stage, giving him the race lead by 14 seconds – a margin he would hold onto through the final stage in Rome.

=== 2024–25: second Giro podium and retirement ===
In 2024, Thomas again targeted the Giro d'Italia, starting the race as the leader for the Netcompany–Ineos. Thomas finished the race third overall, 10 minutes behind race winner Tadej Pogačar. Thomas stated on his podcast that he is "95% certain" he will retire in 2025, when his current contract ends. This was later confirmed in February 2025.

Following his retirement in November 2025, it was announced that he would become Ineos Grenadiers race director.

== In popular culture ==
Welsh-speaking fans of Geraint had begun singing a version of Titw Tomos Las by Hogia'r Wyddfa, a popular Welsh-language quintet from the 1960s and 1970s. The song, which is about the blue tit bird (Titw Tomos Las in Welsh) emphasised Geraint's surname, spelt Tomos in Welsh. BBC Radio Cymru promptly recorded an updated version of the song with two members of Hogia'r Wyddfa as well as contemporary group, Siddi, and brass band, Band Pres Llareggub, as well as local children. The song was recorded for Aled Hughes's morning programme on the national Welsh language station and shared on social media.

Welsh singer-songwriter Max Boyce wrote a poem in honour of Thomas's Tour de France victory, "The Boy Who Climbed a Mountain", which Boyce performed at Thomas's Cardiff homecoming event in August 2018.

In December 2019, an hour-long documentary titled Geraint Thomas:The Road Will Decide was broadcast on the BBC. It followed Thomas' 2018 Tour de France win as well as the feelings of his wife, Sara.

== Personal life ==
Thomas met his wife, Sara Elen Thomas, through a mutual friend. The couple reside in Monaco, and were married in St Tewdrics House, Chepstow, Wales, a Grade II listed Italianate villa that they purchased in October 2015. Geraint and Sara still own the property to this day and it is run as a wedding venue. The couple have a son, whose birth was announced on 4 October 2019. Thomas is a fan of Arsenal F.C.

Thomas published his autobiography, According to G, in October 2025.

== Career achievements ==
=== Major results ===
==== Road ====
2003
1st Kuurne–Brussels–Kuurne Juniores
3rd Road race, National Junior Championships
2004
1st Road race, Welsh National Championships
1st Paris–Roubaix Juniors
1st Stage 1 Acht van Bladel
2nd Overall Junior Tour of Wales
5th Flanders-Europe Classic
2005
1st Road race, Welsh National Championships
2006
1st Overall Flèche du Sud

1st Points classification
1st Young rider classification
1st Stage 2

1st Smithfield Nocturne
3rd Road race, National Championships
2009
5th Coppa Bernocchi
6th Overall Tour of Britain
2010 (1 pro win)
National Championships

1st Road race
3rd Time trial

1st Stage 1 (TTT) Tour of Qatar
Tour de France

Held after Stages 3–6

2011 (1)
1st Overall Bayern Rundfahrt
1st Points classification, Tour of Britain
2nd Road race, National Championships
2nd Dwars door Vlaanderen
6th Classica Sarda
10th Tour of Flanders
Tour de France

Held after Stages 1–7
Combativity award Stage 12

2012 (1)
1st Prologue Tour de Romandie
2013 (1)
2nd Overall Bayern Rundfahrt
3rd Overall Tour Down Under

1st Sprints classification
1st Stage 2

3rd Team time trial, UCI World Championships
4th Omloop Het Nieuwsblad
4th E3 Harelbeke
10th Overall Tour of Qatar
2014 (3)
Commonwealth Games

1st Road race
3rd Time trial

1st Overall Bayern Rundfahrt

1st Stage 4 (ITT)

2nd Time trial, National Championships
3rd E3 Harelbeke
6th Overall Eneco Tour
7th Paris–Roubaix
8th Overall Tour Down Under
8th Tour of Flanders
2015 (3)
1st Overall Volta ao Algarve

1st Points classification
1st Stage 2

1st E3 Harelbeke
1st Stage 1 (TTT) Tour de Romandie
2nd Overall Tour de Suisse
3rd Gent–Wevelgem
5th Overall Paris–Nice
2016 (2)
1st Overall Paris–Nice
1st Overall Volta ao Algarve
9th Time trial, Olympic Games
2017 (4)
1st Overall Tour of the Alps

1st Stage 3

Tour de France

1st Stage 1 (ITT)
Held after Stages 1–4
Held after Stage 1

3rd Team time trial, UCI World Championships
5th Overall Tirreno–Adriatico

1st Stage 2

7th Overall Tour of Britain
2018 (6)
1st Time trial, National Championships
1st Overall Tour de France

1st Stages 11 & 12

1st Overall Critérium du Dauphiné

1st Stage 3 (TTT)

2nd Overall Volta ao Algarve

1st Stage 3 (ITT)

3rd Overall Tirreno–Adriatico
4th UCI World Tour
2019
2nd Overall Tour de France
3rd Overall Tour de Romandie
2020
2nd Overall Tirreno–Adriatico
4th Time trial, UCI World Championships
2021 (2)
1st Overall Tour de Romandie
3rd Overall Critérium du Dauphiné

1st Stage 5

3rd Overall Volta a Catalunya
2022 (1)
1st Overall Tour de Suisse
3rd Overall Tour de France
Commonwealth Games

3rd Time trial
8th Road race

2023
2nd Overall Giro d'Italia

Held after Stages 10–13 & 16–19
Combativity award Stage 9

10th Time trial, UCI World Championships
2024
3rd Overall Giro d'Italia

===== General classification results timeline =====
Grand Tour general classification results
Grand Tour	2007	2008	2009	2010	2011	2012	2013	2014	2015	2016	2017	2018	2019	2020	2021	2022	2023	2024	2025
Giro d'Italia	—	118	—	—	—	80	—	—	—	—	DNF	—	—	DNF	—	—	2	3	—
Tour de France	140	—	—	64	31	—	140	22	15	15	DNF	1	2	—	41	3	—	42	58
/ Vuelta a España	—	—	—	—	—	—	—	—	69	—	—	—	—	—	—	—	31	—	—
Major stage race general classification results
Major stage race	2007	2008	2009	2010	2011	2012	2013	2014	2015	2016	2017	2018	2019	2020	2021	2022	2023	2024	2025
Paris–Nice	—	—	—	86	83	DNF	—	DNF	5	1	—	—	—	—	—	—	—	—	—
/ Tirreno–Adriatico	—	—	DNF	—	—	—	—	—	—	—	5	3	DNF	2	24	—	—	—	—
Volta a Catalunya	—	—	—	—	—	—	—	—	—	DNF	34	—	—	NH	3	—	45	27	45
Tour of the Basque Country	—	—	—	—	—	—	—	—	—	—	—	—	40	NH	—	39	—	—	—
Tour de Romandie	—	—	—	—	88	DNF	—	—	87	51	—	33	3	NH	1	19	—	—	28
Critérium du Dauphiné	—	—	—	21	DNF	—	15	46	—	—	—	1	—	37	3	—	—	—	—
Tour de Suisse	—	—	—	—	—	—	—	—	2	17	—	—	DNF	NH	—	1	—	—	DNF

===== Classics results timeline =====
Monument	2009	2010	2011	2012	2013	2014	2015	2016	2017	2018	2019	2020	2021	2022	2023	2024	2025
Milan–San Remo	—	—	60	—	DNF	DNF	31	169	—	—	—	—	—	—	—	—	110
Tour of Flanders	—	33	10	—	41	8	14	12	—	—	—	—	—	—	—	—	—
Paris–Roubaix	—	64	OTL	—	79	7	DNF	—	—	DNF	—	NH	—	—	—	—	—
Liège–Bastogne–Liège	—	—	—	—	—	—	—	—	—	56	—	—	—	43	—	—	93
Giro di Lombardia	Did not contest during his career																
Classic	2009	2010	2011	2012	2013	2014	2015	2016	2017	2018	2019	2020	2021	2022	2023	2024	2025
Omloop Het Nieuwsblad	—	—	—	—	4	—	—	—	—	—	—	—	—	—	—	—	—
Strade Bianche	DNF	—	—	—	—	—	—	—	—	—	12	—	—	—	—	71	—
Dwars door Vlaanderen	—	32	2	—	19	—	—	—	—	—	—	NH	—	—	—	—	—
E3 Saxo Bank Classic (Note: Race known as E3 Prijs Vlaanderen from 2007 to 2011, E3 Harelbeke from 2012 to 2018 and the E3 BinckBank Classic in 2019.)	—	50	—	—	4	3	1	—	—	—	—	NH	—	—	—	—	—
Gent–Wevelgem	—	DNF	124	—	DNF	112	3	—	—	—	—	—	—	—	—	—	—

===== Major championships timeline =====
Event		2005	2006	2007	2008	2009	2010	2011	2012	2013	2014	2015	2016	2017	2018	2019	2020	2021	2022	2023
Olympic Games	Time trial	Not held			—	Not held			—	Not held			9	Not held				12	Not held	
Olympic Games	Road race	Not held			—	Not held			—	Not held			11	Not held				DNF	Not held	
World Championships	Time trial	—	—	—	—	—	—	—	—	—	—	—	—	—	—	—	4	—	—	10
World Championships	Road race	—	—	—	DNF	DNF	—	81	—	DNF	DNF	—	DNF	—	—	DNF	—	—	—	—
National Championships	Time trial	—	—	—	—	—	3	—	—	—	2	—	—	—	1	—	—	—	—	—
National Championships	Road race	12	3	—	—	—	1	2	—	—	8	—	—	—	—	—	—	—	—	—

Legend
—	Did not compete
DNF	Did not finish
NH	Not held
OTL	Out of time limit

===== Grand Tour record =====
	2007	2008	2009	2010	2011	2012	2013	2014	2015	2016	2017	2018	2019	2020	2021	2022	2023	2024	2025
Giro d'Italia	DNE	118	DNE	DNE	DNE	80	DNE	DNE	DNE	DNE	DNS-13	DNE	DNE	DNS-4	DNE	DNE	2	3	DNE
Points classification	—	82	—	—	—	9	—	—	—	—	—	—	—	—	—	—	12	25	—
Mountains classification	—	NR	—	—	—	NR	—	—	—	—	—	—	—	—	—	—	12	11	—
Young rider classification	—	26	—	—	—	—	—	—	—	—	—	—	—	—	—	—	—	—	—
Tour de France	140	DNE	DNE	64	31	DNE	140	22	15	15	DNF-9	1	2	DNE	41	3	DNE	42	58
Stages won	0	—	—	0	0	—	0	0	0	0	1	2	0	—	0	0	—	0	0
Points classification	67	—	—	19	18	—	126	53	48	79	—	8	12	—	107	12	—	108	88
Mountains classification	NR	—	—	NR	19	—	NR	34	24	63	—	4	13	—	NR	10	—	NR	NR
Young rider classification	22	—	—	9	7	—	—	—	—	—	—	—	—	—	—	—	—	—	—
Vuelta a España	DNE	DNE	DNE	DNE	DNE	DNE	DNE	DNE	69	DNE	DNE	DNE	DNE	DNE	DNE	DNE	31	DNE	
Points classification	—	—	—	—	—	—	—	—	78	—	—	—	—	—	—	—	73	—	
Mountains classification	—	—	—	—	—	—	—	—	NR	—	—	—	—	—	—	—	38	—	

Legend
1	Winner
2–3	Top three-finish
4–10	Top ten-finish
11–	Other finish
DNE	Did not enter
DNF-x	Did not finish (retired on stage x)
DNS-x	Did not start (not started on stage x)
HD-x	Finished outside time limit (occurred on stage x)
DSQ	Disqualified
N/A	Race/classification not held
NR	Not ranked in this classification

==== Track ====
2004
1st Scratch, UCI World Junior Championships
2nd Points race, UEC European Junior Championships
2005
National Championships

1st Scratch
1st Team pursuit

UIV Talent Cup

1st Madison, Bremen (with Mark Cavendish)
1st Madison, Dortmund (with Ben Swift)

2006
UEC European Under-23 Championships

1st Team pursuit
2nd Scratch

UCI World Cup Classics

1st Team pursuit, Moscow
3rd Team pursuit, Sydney
3rd Madison, Sydney (with Mark Cavendish)

2nd Team pursuit, UCI World Championships
2nd Team pursuit, National Championships
3rd Points race, Commonwealth Games
2007
1st Team pursuit, UCI World Championships
UCI World Cup Classics

1st Team pursuit, Beijing
2nd Madison, Manchester (with Rob Hayles)

2008
1st Team pursuit, Olympic Games
1st Team pursuit, UCI World Championships
UCI World Cup Classics

1st Team pursuit, Copenhagen
1st Team pursuit, Manchester

2009
UCI World Cup Classics

1st Individual pursuit, Manchester
1st Team pursuit, Manchester

National Championships

1st Individual pursuit
2nd Madison (with Luke Rowe)

2010
3rd Scratch, National Championships
2011
1st Team pursuit, UEC European Championships
UCI World Cup Classics

1st Team pursuit, Manchester
2nd Individual pursuit, Manchester

2012
1st Team pursuit, Olympic Games
UCI World Championships

1st Team pursuit
2nd Madison (with Ben Swift)

2nd Team pursuit, UCI World Cup, London

=== World records ===
Discipline	Record	Date	Event	Velodrome	Ref
Team pursuit	3:56.322	27 March 2008	World Championships	Manchester	
Team pursuit	3:55.202	17 August 2008	Olympic Games	Laoshan (Beijing)	
Team pursuit	3:53.314	18 August 2008	Olympic Games	Laoshan (Beijing)	
Team pursuit	3:53.295	4 April 2012	World Championships	Hisense Arena (Melbourne)	
Team pursuit	3:52.499	2 August 2012	Olympic Games	Lee Valley (London)	
Team pursuit	3:51.659	3 August 2012	Olympic Games	Lee Valley (London)	

=== Awards and honours ===
BBC Sports Personality of the Year 2018
BBC Wales Sports Personality of the Year 2014, 2018

== See also ==
- 2012 Summer Olympics and Paralympics gold post boxes
- List of British cyclists
- List of British cyclists who have led the Tour de France general classification
- List of multiple Olympic gold medalists
- List of Olympic medalists in cycling (men)
- List of people from Cardiff
- World record progression track cycling – Men's team pursuit
- Yellow jersey statistics
