= Sky Track Cycling =

Team information
- UCI code: SKY
- Registered: Manchester, United Kingdom
- Founded: 2008
- Disbanded: 2013
- Discipline: Track cycling

Key personnel
- General manager: Shane Sutton

Sky Track Cycling was a professional track cycling team competing in the UCI Track Cycling World Cup Classics series. The team, based at the Manchester Velodrome, was made up of British riders, including Olympic Gold medalists Chris Hoy, Jason Kenny, Victoria Pendleton and Jamie Staff. It was managed by Shane Sutton with Dave Brailsford acting as team representative.

The team was launched in October 2008 with Hoy, Kenny, Pendleton, Staff, Ross Edgar and Shanaze Reade. In the 2009 track cycling off-season, Reade was replaced by Peter Mitchell and Chris Newton. For the 2010–2011 season, Newton and Staff retired, Mitchell left the team, Reade made a return and Matthew Crampton joined the team. The team remained unchanged for the 2011–2012 season.

The team was not registered with the UCI for the 2013–14 track cycling season.

== Major achievements ==
Date	Competition	Location	Country	Event	Placing	Rider	Nationality
31 October 2008	2008–09 World Cup	Manchester	United Kingdom	Sprint	1	Victoria Pendleton	GBR
31 October 2008	2008–09 World Cup	Manchester	United Kingdom	Keirin	2	Jason Kenny	GBR
1 November 2008	2008–09 World Cup	Manchester	United Kingdom	Sprint	1	Jason Kenny	GBR
1 November 2008	2008–09 World Cup	Manchester	United Kingdom	500 m time trial	1	Victoria Pendleton	GBR
2 November 2008	2008–09 World Cup	Manchester	United Kingdom	Team sprint	1	Ross Edgar	GBR
2 November 2008	2008–09 World Cup	Manchester	United Kingdom	Team sprint	1	Jason Kenny	GBR
2 November 2008	2008–09 World Cup	Manchester	United Kingdom	Team sprint	1	Jamie Staff	GBR
2 November 2008	2008–09 World Cup	Manchester	United Kingdom	Keirin	1	Victoria Pendleton	GBR
2 November 2008	5th International Keirin Event	Manchester	United Kingdom	International keirin	2	Ross Edgar	GBR
13 February 2009	2008–09 World Cup	Copenhagen	Denmark	Team sprint	1	Chris Hoy	GBR
13 February 2009	2008–09 World Cup	Copenhagen	Denmark	Team sprint	1	Jason Kenny	GBR
13 February 2009	2008–09 World Cup	Copenhagen	Denmark	Team sprint	1	Jamie Staff	GBR
13 February 2009	2008–09 World Cup	Copenhagen	Denmark	Sprint	1	Victoria Pendleton	GBR
30 October 2009	2009–10 World Cup	Manchester	United Kingdom	Keirin	1	Chris Hoy	GBR
30 October 2009	2009–10 World Cup	Manchester	United Kingdom	Sprint	1	Victoria Pendleton	GBR
30 October 2009	2009–10 World Cup	Manchester	United Kingdom	Sprint	1	Chris Hoy	GBR
30 October 2009	2009–10 World Cup	Manchester	United Kingdom	500 m time trial	2	Victoria Pendleton	GBR
1 November 2009	2009–10 World Cup	Manchester	United Kingdom	Team sprint	1	Ross Edgar	GBR
1 November 2009	2009–10 World Cup	Manchester	United Kingdom	Team sprint	1	Chris Hoy	GBR
1 November 2009	2009–10 World Cup	Manchester	United Kingdom	Team sprint	1	Jamie Staff	GBR
