= Ismaël Kip =

Dutch racing cyclist

Personal information
- Born: 6 May 1987 (age 39) Zwolle, Netherlands

Cycling career
- Sport: Cycling
- Current team: Retired
- Disciplines: Road; Track
- Role: Rider

Professional teams
- 2006–2007: KrolStonE Continental Team
- 2008–2010: Ubbink–Syntec Cycling Team

Ismaël Kip (born 6 May 1987 in Zwolle) is a Dutch former professional racing cyclist.

== Major results ==
2004
1st Individual pursuit, National Junior Track Championships
2007
1st ZLM Tour
2008
1st Rotterdam, Under-23 UIV Cup (with Kilian Moser)
2009
1st Rotterdam, Under-23 UIV Cup (with Roy Pieters)

== See also ==
- Cycling in the Netherlands
