= Lyubomyr Polatayko =

Ukrainian cyclist

Personal information
- Full name: Lyubomyr Mykolayovich Polatayko; Любомир Миколайович Полатайко
- Born: 21 November 1979 (age 46) Nadvirna, Ukrainian SSR, Soviet Union

Cycling career
- Sport: Cycling
- Current team: Retired
- Disciplines: Track; Road
- Role: Rider
- Rider type: Endurance
Medal record
Representing Ukraine
Men's track cycling
World Championships
Gold medal – first place	2001 Antwerp	Team pursuit
Silver medal – second place	2006 Bordeaux	Madison
Silver medal – second place	2007 Palma de Mallorca	Team pursuit
Bronze medal – third place	2006 Bordeaux	Team pursuit

Lyubomyr Mykolayovich Polatayko (Ukrainian: Любомир Миколайович Полатайко; born 21 November 1979) is a Ukrainian former professional racing cyclist.

== Major results ==
2002
1st Scratch race, Round 3 2002 UCI Track Cycling World Cup Classics, Moscow
3rd Pursuit, Round 5 2002 UCI Track Cycling World Cup Classics, Kunming
2003
2nd 2003 European Track Championships, Omnium, Elite
2005
3rd Team Pursuit, Round 2 2004–2005 Track World Cup, Los Angeles
2006
2nd Team Pursuit, Round 4 2005–2006 Track World Cup, Sydney
2nd Madison, UCI Track Cycling World Championships
3rd Team Pursuit, UCI Track Cycling World Championships
3rd Team Pursuit, Round 1 2006–2007 Track World Cup, Sydney
2007
1st Team Pursuit, Round 3 2006–2007 Track World Cup, Los Angeles
2nd Team Pursuit, UCI Track Cycling World Championships
3rd Madison, Round 2 2007–2008 Track World Cup, Beijing
2008
3rd Team Pursuit, Round 3 2007–2008 Track World Cup, Los Angeles
3rd Team Pursuit, Round 2 2008–2009 Track World Cup, Melbourne
