= Peter Dawson (cyclist) =

Australian cyclist (born 1982)

Personal information
- Full name: Peter Douglas Dawson
- Born: 4 February 1982 (age 44) Pinjarra, Australia

Cycling career
- Sport: Cycling
- Discipline: Track
- Role: Rider
- Rider type: Pursuitist
Medal record
Representing Australia
Men's track cycling
Olympic Games
Gold medal – first place	2004 Athens	4000 m team pursuit
World Championships
Gold medal – first place	2002 Ballerup	Team pursuit
Gold medal – first place	2003 Stuttgart	Team pursuit
Gold medal – first place	2004 Melbourne	Team pursuit
Gold medal – first place	2006 Bordeaux	Team pursuit
Commonwealth Games
Gold medal – first place	2002 Manchester	Team pursuit
Silver medal – second place	2006 Melbourne	Team pursuit

Peter Douglas Dawson OAM (born 4 February 1982 in Pinjarra) is an Australian professional racing cyclist. He was an Australian Institute of Sport scholarship holder.

== Major results ==
2002
1st, World Championship, Track, Team Pursuit
1st, Sydney World Cup, Pursuit (AUS)
2nd, Sydney World Cup, Team Pursuit (AUS)
1st, Commonwealth Games, Track, Team Pursuit
2003
1st, World Championship, Track, Team Pursuit
3rd, Overall, Be Active Instead Criterium Series
2004
1st, World Championship, Track, Team Pursuit
1st, Stage 1, Giro delle Regione U23
2005
1st, Stage 9, Tour of Tasmania
1st, Moscow World Cup, Team Pursuit
2006
2nd, National Championship, Track, Pursuit
2nd, Commonwealth Games, Track, Team Pursuit
1st, World Championship, Track, Team Pursuit
2007
3rd, National Championship, Track, Team Sprint
3rd, National Championship, Track, Team Pursuit
1st, Stage 1b, Tour de Perth
International Cycling Classic

1st, Stage 13
1st, Stage 17

Tour of the Murray River

1st, Stage 5
1st, Stage 13

3rd, Sydney World Cup, Team Pursuit
2008
1st, Los Angeles World Cup, Team Pursuit
