= Roman Kononenko =

Ukrainian cyclist

Personal information
- Born: 13 April 1981 (age 45) Simferopol, Ukrainian SSR, Soviet Union
- Height: 1.80 m (5 ft 11 in)
- Weight: 71 kg (157 lb)

Cycling career
- Sport: Cycling
- Current team: Retired
- Disciplines: Track, road
- Role: Rider

Professional teams
- 2006–2007: Arda Natura–Pinarello–Ukraina
- 2007: ISD Sport Donetsk
Medal record
Representing Ukraine
Men's track cycling
World Championships
Silver medal – second place	2007 Palma de Mallorca	Team pursuit
Bronze medal – third place	2006 Bordeaux	Team pursuit

Roman Kononenko (born 13 April 1981) is a Ukrainian former track cyclist.

== Major results ==
2002
1st Team pursuit, European Under–23 Track Championships
World Cup Classics

2nd Team pursuit, Moscow

2003
1st Team pursuit, European Under–23 Track Championships
2004
2004–05 World Cup Classics

1st Team pursuit, Moscow
2nd Team pursuit, Los Angeles

2005
2005–06 World Cup Classics

3rd Team pursuit, Moscow

2006
3rd Team pursuit, World Track Championships
2006–07 World Cup Classics

3rd Team pursuit, Sydney

2007
2nd Team pursuit, World Track Championships
2008
1st Stage 4 Thüringen Rundfahrt der U23
2008–09 World Cup Classics

3rd Team pursuit, Melbourne

2009
2009–10 World Cup Classics

3rd Individual pursuit, Manchester
