= 1981 UCI Track Cycling World Championships =

- Venue: Brno, Czechoslovakia
- Date: 31 August–6 September 1981
- Velodrome: Brno Velodrome
- Events: 14

The 1981 UCI Track Cycling World Championships were the World Championship for track cycling. They took place in Brno, Czechoslovakia in 1981. Fourteen events were contested, 12 for men (5 for professionals, 7 for amateurs) and 2 for women.

In the same period, the 1981 UCI Road World Championships were organized in Prague.

== Medal summary ==
Event	Gold	Silver	Bronze
Men's Professional Events
Men's keirin	Danny Clark; Australia	Guido Bontempi; Italy	Chiyoshi Kubo (久保千代志); Japan
Men's sprint	Kōichi Nakano; Japan	Gordon Singleton; Canada	Kenji Takahashi (高橋健二); Japan
Men's individual pursuit	Alain Bondue; France	Hans-Henrik Ørsted; Denmark	Bert Oosterbosch; Netherlands
Men's points race	Urs Freuler; Switzerland	Danny Clark; Australia	Giuseppe Saronni; Italy
Men's motor-paced	René Kos; Netherlands	Bruno Vicino; Italy	Wilfried Peffgen; West Germany
Men's Amateur Events
Men's 1 km time trial	Lothar Thoms; East Germany; 1:05.85	Fredy Schmidtke; West Germany; 1:06.02	Sergei Kopylov; Soviet Union; 1:06.56
Men's sprint	Sergei Kopylov; Soviet Union	Lutz Heßlich; East Germany	Detlef Uibel; East Germany
Men's individual pursuit	Detlef Macha; East Germany; 4:47.78	Dainis Liepiņš; Soviet Union; 4:55.19	Maurizio Bidinost; Italy; 4:49.40
Men's team pursuit	East Germany; Detlef Macha; Bernd Dittert; Axel Grosser; Volker Winkler	Soviet Union; Alexandre Krasnov; Viktor Manakov; Alexandre Kulikov; Nikolai Kuznetzov	Czechoslovakia; Martin Penc; Aleš Trčka; František Raboň; Jiří Pokorný
Men's points race	Lutz Haueisen; East Germany	Leonard Harvey Nitz; United States	Michael Marcussen; Denmark
Men's motor-paced	Mattheus Pronk; Netherlands	Rainer Podlesch; West Germany	Max Hurzeler; Switzerland
Men's tandem	Czechoslovakia; Ivan Kučírek; Pavel Martínek	West Germany; Dieter Giebken; Fredy Schmidtke	Poland; Ryszard Konkolewski; Zbigniew Piątek
Women's Events
Women's sprint	Sheila Young; United States	Claudine Vierstraete; Belgium	Claudia Lommatzsch; West Germany
Women's individual pursuit	Nadezhda Kibardina; Soviet Union	Tamara Polyakova; Soviet Union	Jeannie Longo; France

== Medal table ==
Rank	Nation	Gold	Silver	Bronze	Total
1	East Germany (RDA)	4	1	1	6
2	Soviet Union (URS)	2	3	1	6
3	Netherlands (NED)	2	0	1	3
4	Australia (AUS)	1	1	0	2
4	United States (USA)	1	1	0	2
6	Japan (JPN)	1	0	2	3
7	Czechoslovakia (TCH)	1	0	1	2
7	France (FRA)	1	0	1	2
7	Switzerland (SUI)	1	0	1	2
10	West Germany (FRG)	0	3	2	5
11	Italy (ITA)	0	2	2	4
12	Denmark (DEN)	0	1	1	2
13	Belgium (BEL)	0	1	0	1
13	Canada (CAN)	0	1	0	1
15	Poland (POL)	0	0	1	1
Totals (15 entries)		14	14	14	42

== Competitors ==
=== The Netherlands ===
The next riders were selected by the KNWU after the Dutch national championships and were published on 10 August 1981.

Women
Rider	Event
Erika Omen	Sprint
Sandra de Nijs	Sprint
Petra de Bruin	Individual pursuit
Monique Kauffmann	Individual pursuit

Amateur riders
Rider	Event
Ab van Asten	Individual pursuit team pursuit points race
Erick Ge..	Motor-paced
Ab Harren	team pursuit points race
Gaby Minneboo	Motor-paced
Rik Moorman	team pursuit
Peter Pieters	Individual pursuit team pursuit points race
Sjaak Pieters	Sprint; Tandem
Mathé Pronk	Motor-paced
John Roozenburg	team pursuit points race
Ger Slot	Motor-paced
Reinier Valkenburg	Sprint; 1 km time trial
Tom Vrolijk	Sprint; Tandem
Eric Dompeling (reserve)	team pursuit

Professionals
Rider	Event
Bert Oosterbosch	Individual pursuit
Roy Schuiten	Individual pursuit
Herman Ponsteen (if he is fit)	Individual pursuit
Hans Vonk	Points race
Martin Venix	Motor-paced
René Kos	Motor-paced
Martin Rietveld	Motor-paced

=== Australia ===
Men's professional
Danny Clark - men's keirin

=== Belgium ===
Women
Claudine Vierstraete - women's sprint (silver) (eliminated Galina Tsareva in earlier round)
Gerda Sierens - women's individual pursuit

=== Canada ===
Men's amateurs
? - men's team pursuit
? - men's team pursuit
? - men's team pursuit
? - men's team pursuit

=== Denmark ===
Men's professional
Oersted - individual pursuit

=== Czech Republic ===
Women
? - women's sprint (won her qualification heat)
Hana Hotova - women's sprint (finished 2nd in qualification heat)

=== East Germany ===
Men's amateur
Detlaf Macha - amateur individual pursuit (gold) (won qualification in 4:46.71, won final in 4:47.78)

=== France ===
Men's amateur
Cahard - sprint (felt and broke two ribs)
Men's professional
Patrick Clerc - keirin (felt in 1st round repaches and was taken away with a brancard)

=== West Germany ===
Women
Claudia Lommatzsch - women's sprint (bronze) (qualified 1st round, qualified 2nd round, won 3rd round from Sue Novarra (2-0), quarter final.., won bronze final from Natalya Kroetsjeniskaja after 3 races)

Men's amateur
Rainer Podlesch - motor-paced (silver) (qualified for final after winning qualification heat)
Schutz - motor-paced

Men's professional
Schultz - motor-paced

=== Italy ===
Men's amateur
Fusarpoli - motor-paced (qualified for final after winning qualification heat)
Men's professional
Borgognoni - individual pursuit
Morandi - individual pursuit
Vicino - motor-paced
Women
Rosella Gabiati - women's sprint (won 1st round from Sue Novarra)

=== Lebanon ===
Men's amateur
Ahmed Abdussal Gariani - sprint (lost from Rainier Valkenburg in 1st round)

=== Poland ===
Men's amateur
Jan Jankiewicz - individual pursuit (lost bronze medal race from Maurizio Bidinost (5:52.01 vs 4:49.40))
Platek - sprint (won 2nd round repaches from Rainier Valkenburg)
Konkoleweski - tandem (lost from the Netherlands in first round, won the repechages)
? - tandem (lost from the Netherlands in first round, won the repechages)

=== Brazil ===
? - men's amateur individual pursuit

=== Soviet Union ===
Women's
Galina Tsareva - women's sprint (eliminated by Claudine Vierstraete)
Natalya Kroetsjeniskaja - women's sprint (lost bronze final from Claudia Lommatzsch after 3 races)
Olga Kibardina - women's individual pursuit
Men's amateur
Goelasjvili - sprint (won 2nd round from Rainier Valkenburg)

=== Switzerland ===
Men's amateur
Max Hurzeler - motor-paced (bronze)
Isler - sprint (lost from Rainier Valkenburg in 1st round)
Men's professional
Urs Freuler - keirin

=== United States ===
Women
Conny Paravaskin - sprint (finished 3rd in her qualification heat)
Sheila Young - sprint (gold) (qualified 1st round, won 2nd round from Erica Oomen, qualified 3rd round, result quarter final?)
Sue Novarra - sprint (lost 1st round from Rosella Gabiati, lost 2nd round, won 2nd round repechages from Erica Oomen, lost 3rd round from Lommatzsch (0-2))

Men's professional
Eric Heiden - individual pursuit (finished 19th and last)

== See also ==
- 1981 UCI Road World Championships
