= 1983 UCI Track Cycling World Championships =

Cycling competition

- Venue: Zurich, Switzerland
- Date: 23–28 August 1983
- Velodrome: Oerlikon Velodrome
- Events: 14

The 1983 UCI Track Cycling World Championships were the World Championship for track cycling. They took place in Zurich, Switzerland in 1983. Fourteen events were contested, 12 for men (5 for professionals, 7 for amateurs) and 2 for women.

In the same period, the 1983 UCI Road World Championships were organized in Altenrhein.

== Medal summary ==
Event	Gold	Silver	Bronze
Men's Professional Events
Men's keirin	Urs Freuler; Switzerland	Danny Clark; Australia	Gilbert Hatton; United States
Men's sprint	Kōichi Nakano; Japan	Yavé Cahard; France	Ottavio Dazzan; Italy
Men's individual pursuit	Steele Bishop; Australia	Robert Dill-Bundi; Switzerland	Hans-Henrik Ørsted; Denmark
Men's points race	Urs Freuler; Switzerland	Guido Bontempi; Italy	Gary Sutton; Australia
Men's motor-paced	Bruno Vicino; Italy	René Koos; Netherlands	Martin Havik; Netherlands
Men's Amateur Events
Men's 1 km time trial	Sergei Kopylov; Soviet Union	Gerhard Scheller; West Germany	Lothar Thoms; East Germany
Men's sprint	Lutz Heßlich; East Germany	Sergei Kopylov; Soviet Union	Michael Hübner; East Germany
Men's individual pursuit	Viktor Kupovets; Soviet Union	Bernd Dittert; East Germany	Dainis Liepiņš; Soviet Union
Men's team pursuit	West Germany; Rolf Gölz; Roland Günther; Gerhard Strittmatter; Michael Marx	East Germany; Carsten Wolf; Mario Hernig; Bernd Dittert; Hans-Joachim Pohl	Czechoslovakia; Pavel Soukup; Aleš Trčka; František Raboň; Robert Štěrba
Men's points race	Michael Marcussen; Denmark	Hans-Joachim Pohl; East Germany	Ivan Romanov; Soviet Union
Men's motor-paced	Rainer Podlesch; West Germany	Mattheus Pronk; Netherlands	Walter Baumgartner; Switzerland
Men's tandem	France; Philippe Vernet; Franck Depine	Czechoslovakia; Ivan Kučírek; Pavel Martínek	West Germany; Dieter Giebken; Fredy Schmidtke
Women's Events
Women's sprint	Connie Paraskevin; United States	Claudia Lommatzsch; West Germany	Isabelle Nicoloso; France
Women's individual pursuit	Connie Carpenter; United States	Cynthia Olavarri; United States	Jeannie Longo; France

== Medal table ==
Rank	Nation	Gold	Silver	Bronze	Total
1	West Germany (FRG)	2	2	0	4
2	Soviet Union (URS)	2	1	2	5
3	Switzerland (SUI)	2	1	1	4
3	United States (USA)	2	1	1	4
5	East Germany (RDA)	1	3	2	6
6	France (FRA)	1	1	2	4
7	Australia (AUS)	1	1	1	3
7	Italy (ITA)	1	1	1	3
9	Denmark (DEN)	1	0	1	2
10	Japan (JPN)	1	0	0	1
11	Netherlands (NED)	0	2	1	3
12	Czechoslovakia (TCH)	0	1	1	2
Totals (12 entries)		14	14	13	41

== See also ==
- 1983 UCI Road World Championships
