= 1985 UCI Track Cycling World Championships =

Cyclist world cup

- Venue: Bassano del Grappa, Italy
- Date: 21 August–1 September 1985
- Velodrome: Rino Mercante Stadium
- Events: 14

The 1985 UCI Track Cycling World Championships were the World Championship for track cycling. They took place in Bassano del Grappa, Italy in 1985. Fourteen events were contested, 12 for men (5 for professionals, 7 for amateurs) and 2 for women.

In the same period, the 1985 UCI Road World Championships were organized in Giavera del Montello.

== Medal summary ==
Event	Gold	Silver	Bronze
Men's Professional Events
Men's keirin	Urs Freuler; Switzerland	Ottavio Dazzan; Italy	Masamitsu Takizawa (滝澤正光); Japan; Dieter Giebken; West Germany
Men's sprint	Kōichi Nakano; Japan	Yoshiyuki Matsueda (松枝義幸); Japan	Ottavio Dazzan; Italy
Men's individual pursuit	Hans-Henrik Ørsted; Denmark	Tony Doyle; Great Britain	Gregor Braun; West Germany
Men's points race	Urs Freuler; Switzerland	Hans Ledermann; Switzerland	Stefano Allocchio; Italy
Men's motor-paced	Bruno Vicino; Italy	Danny Clark; Australia	Werner Betz; West Germany
Men's Amateur Events
Men's 1 km time trial	Jens Glücklich; East Germany	Philippe Boyer; France	Martin Vinnicombe; Australia
Men's sprint	Lutz Heßlich; East Germany	Michael Hübner; East Germany	Ralf-Guido Kuschy; East Germany
Men's individual pursuit	Viatcheslav Ekimov; Soviet Union	Gintautas Umaras; Soviet Union	Roland Günther; West Germany
Men's team pursuit	Italy; Roberto Amadio; Massimo Brunelli; Gianpaolo Grisondi; Silvio Martinello	Poland; Ryszard Dawidowicz; Marian Turowski; Leszek Stępniewski; Andrzej Sikorski	Soviet Union; Viatcheslav Ekimov; Alexander Krasnov; Marat Ganeiev; Vassili Schpundov
Men's points race	Martin Penc; Czechoslovakia	Philippe Grivel; Switzerland	Dan Frost; Denmark
Men's motor-paced	Roberto Dotti; Italy	Roland Königshofer; Austria	Mario Gentili; Italy
Men's tandem	Czechoslovakia; Vítězslav Vobořil; Roman Řehounek	United States; Nelson Vails; Leslie Barczewski	West Germany; Sascha Allscheid; Franck Weber
Women's Events
Women's sprint	Isabelle Nicoloso; France	Connie Paraskevin; United States	Natalia Krushelnitskaia; Soviet Union
Women's individual pursuit	Rebecca Twigg; United States	Jeannie Longo; France	Margaret Maas; United States

== Medal table ==
Rank	Nation	Gold	Silver	Bronze	Total
1	Italy (ITA)	3	1	3	7
2	Switzerland (SUI)	2	2	0	4
3	East Germany (GDR)	2	1	1	4
4	Czechoslovakia (TCH)	2	0	0	2
5	United States (USA)	1	2	1	4
6	France (FRA)	1	2	0	3
7	Soviet Union (URS)	1	1	2	4
8	Japan (JPN)	1	1	1	3
9	Denmark (DEN)	1	0	1	2
10	Australia (AUS)	0	1	1	2
11	Austria (AUT)	0	1	0	1
11	Great Britain (GBR)	0	1	0	1
11	Poland (POL)	0	1	0	1
14	West Germany (FRG)	0	0	5	5
Totals (14 entries)		14	14	15	43

== See also ==
- 1985 UCI Road World Championships
