= UCI Track Cycling World Championships – Men's points race =

The UCI Track Cycling World Championships – Men's points race is the world championship points race held annually at the UCI Track Cycling World Championships. It was first held at the 1980 championships in Besançon, France. As of 2026, Urs Freuler from Switzerland is the most successful cyclist with eight victories, all achieved in the first tend editions of the race, with Cameron Meyer the next most successful with five titles. Frueler's eight championships is more than achieved by any other nation bar his own.

== Medalists ==
Championships	Winner	Runner-up	Third
1980 Besançon	Stan Tourné; Belgium	Giovanni Mantovani; Italy	Heinz Betz; West Germany
1981 Brno	Urs Freuler; Switzerland	Danny Clark; Australia	Giuseppe Saronni; Italy
1982 Leicester	Urs Freuler; Switzerland	Gary Sutton; Australia	Roman Hermann; Liechtenstein
1983 Zürich	Urs Freuler; Switzerland	Guido Bontempi; Italy	Gary Sutton; Australia
1984 Barcelona	Urs Freuler; Switzerland	Gary Sutton; Australia	Henry Rinklin; West Germany
1985 Bassano del Grappa	Urs Freuler; Switzerland	Hans Ledermann; Switzerland	Stefano Allocchio; Italy
1986 Colorado Springs	Urs Freuler; Switzerland	Michel Vaarten; Belgium	Stefano Allocchio; Italy
1987 Vienna	Urs Freuler; Switzerland	Tony Doyle; Great Britain	Roger Ilegems; Belgium
1988 Ghent	Daniel Wyder; Switzerland	Adriano Baffi; Italy	Michael Marcussen; Denmark
1989 Lyon	Urs Freuler; Switzerland	Gary Sutton; Australia	Martin Penc; Czechoslovakia
1990 Maebashi	Laurent Biondi; France	Michael Marcussen; Denmark	Danny Clark; Australia
1991 Stuttgart	Viatcheslav Ekimov; Soviet Union	Francis Moreau; France	Peter Pieters; Netherlands
1992 Valencia	Bruno Risi; Switzerland	Jonas Romanovas; Lithuania	Juan Esteban Curuchet; Argentina
1993 Hamar	Etienne De Wilde; Belgium	Eric Magnin; France	Vasyl Yakovlev; Ukraine
1994 Palermo	Bruno Risi; Switzerland	Jan Bo Petersen; Denmark	Franz Stocher; Austria
1995 Bogotá	Silvio Martinello; Italy	Remigius Lupeikis; Lithuania	Sergey Lavrenenko; Kazakhstan
1996 Manchester	Joan Llaneras; Spain	Michael Sandstød; Denmark	Silvio Martinello; Italy
1997 Perth	Silvio Martinello; Italy	Bruno Risi; Switzerland	Joan Llaneras; Spain
1998 Bordeaux	Joan Llaneras; Spain	Andreas Kappes; Germany	Silvio Martinello; Italy
1999 Berlin	Bruno Risi; Switzerland	Vasyl Yakovlev; Ukraine	Ho-Sung Cho; South Korea
2000 Manchester	Joan Llaneras; Spain	Matthew Gilmore; Belgium	Franz Stocher; Austria
2001 Antwerp	Bruno Risi; Switzerland	Juan Esteban Curuchet; Argentina	Franz Stocher; Austria
2002 Ballerup	Chris Newton; Great Britain	Franz Stocher; Austria	Juan Curuchet; Argentina
2003 Stuttgart	Franz Stocher; Austria	Joan Llaneras; Spain	Jos Pronk; Netherlands
2004 Melbourne	Franck Perque; France	Milton Wynants; Uruguay	Juan Curuchet; Argentina
2005 Los Angeles	Volodymyr Rybin; Ukraine	Ioannis Tamouridis; Greece	Joan Llaneras; Spain
2006 Bordeaux	Peter Schep; Netherlands	Rafał Ratajczyk; Poland	Vasil Kiryienka; Belarus
2007 Palma de Mallorca	Joan Llaneras; Spain	Iljo Keisse; Belgium	Mikhail Ignatiev; Russia
2008 Manchester	Vasil Kiryienka; Belarus	Christophe Riblon; France	Peter Schep; Netherlands
2009 Pruszków	Cameron Meyer; Australia	Daniel Kreutzfeldt; Denmark	Chris Newton; Great Britain
2010 Ballerup	Cameron Meyer; Australia	Peter Schep; Netherlands	Milan Kadlec; Czech Republic
2011 Apeldoorn	Edwin Ávila; Colombia	Cameron Meyer; Australia	Morgan Kneisky; France
2012 Melbourne	Cameron Meyer; Australia	Ben Swift; Great Britain	Kenny De Ketele; Belgium
2013 Minsk	Simon Yates; Great Britain	Eloy Teruel; Spain	Kirill Sveshnikov; Russia
2014 Cali	Edwin Ávila; Colombia	Thomas Scully; New Zealand	Eloy Teruel; Spain
2015 Yvelines	Artur Ershov; Russia	Eloy Teruel; Spain	Maximilian Beyer; Germany
2016 London	Jonathan Dibben; Great Britain	Andreas Graf; Austria	Kenny De Ketele; Belgium
2017 Hong Kong	Cameron Meyer; Australia	Kenny De Ketele; Belgium	Wojciech Pszczolarski; Poland
2018 Apeldoorn	Cameron Meyer; Australia	Jan-Willem van Schip; Netherlands	Mark Stewart; Great Britain
2019 Pruszków	Jan-Willem van Schip; Netherlands	Sebastián Mora; Spain	Mark Downey; Ireland
2020 Berlin	Corbin Strong; New Zealand	Sebastián Mora; Spain	Roy Eefting; Netherlands
2021 Roubaix	Benjamin Thomas; France	Kenny De Ketele; Belgium	Vincent Hoppezak; Netherlands
2022 Saint-Quentin-en-Yvelines	Yoeri Havik; Netherlands	Roger Kluge; Germany	Fabio Van den Bossche; Belgium
2023 Glasgow	Aaron Gate; New Zealand	Albert Torres; Spain	Fabio Van den Bossche; Belgium
2024 Ballerup	Sebastián Mora; Spain	Niklas Larsen; Denmark	Philip Heijnen; Netherlands
2025 Santiago	Josh Tarling; Great Britain	Peter Moore; United States	Clément Petit; France
2026 Shanghai	Mark Stewart; Great Britain	Benjamin Thomas; France	Carlos Salgueiro; Portugal

== Medal table ==
Rank	Nation	Gold	Silver	Bronze	Total
1	Switzerland	13	2	0	15
2	Spain	5	6	3	14
3	Australia	5	5	2	12
4	Great Britain	5	2	2	9
5	France	3	4	2	9
6	Netherlands	3	2	6	11
7	Belgium	2	5	5	12
8	Italy	2	3	5	10
9	New Zealand	2	1	0	3
10	Colombia	2	0	0	2
11	Austria	1	2	3	6
12	Ukraine	1	1	1	3
13	Russia	1	0	2	3
14	Belarus	1	0	1	2
15	Soviet Union	1	0	0	1
16	Denmark	0	5	1	6
17	Germany	0	2	1	3
18	Lithuania	0	2	0	2
19	Argentina	0	1	3	4
20	Poland	0	1	1	2
21	Greece	0	1	0	1
21	United States	0	1	0	1
21	Uruguay	0	1	0	1
24	West Germany	0	0	2	2
25	Czech Republic	0	0	1	1
25	Czechoslovakia	0	0	1	1
25	Ireland	0	0	1	1
25	Kazakhstan	0	0	1	1
25	Liechtenstein	0	0	1	1
25	Portugal	0	0	1	1
25	South Korea	0	0	1	1
Totals (31 entries)		47	47	47	141
