= 1982 UCI Track Cycling World Championships =

- Venue: Leicester, United Kingdom
- Date: 23–29 August 1982
- Velodrome: Saffron Lane Velodrome
- Events: 14

The 1982 UCI Track Cycling World Championships were the World Championship for track cycling. They took place in Leicester, the United Kingdom in 1982. Fourteen events were contested, 12 for men (5 for professionals, 7 for amateurs) and 2 for women.

In the same period, the 1982 UCI Road World Championships were organized in Chichester.

== Medal summary ==
Event	Gold	Silver	Bronze
Men's Elite Events
Men's keirin	Gordon Singleton; Canada	Danny Clark; Australia	Toru Kitamura (北村徹); Japan
Men's sprint	Kōichi Nakano; Japan	Gordon Singleton; Canada	Yavé Cahard; France
Men's individual pursuit	Alain Bondue; France	Hans-Henrik Ørsted; Denmark	Maurizio Bidinost; Italy
Men's points race	Urs Freuler; Switzerland	Gary Sutton; Australia	Roman Hermann; Liechtenstein
Men's motor-paced	Martin Venix; Netherlands	Wilfried Peffgen; Germany	Bruno Vicino; Italy
Men's Amateur Events
Men's 1 km time trial	Fredy Schmidtke; West Germany	Lothar Thoms; East Germany	Emanuel Raasch; East Germany
Men's sprint	Sergei Kopylov; Soviet Union	Lutz Heßlich; East Germany	Emzar Gulachvili; Soviet Union
Men's individual pursuit	Detlef Macha; East Germany	Rolf Gölz; West Germany	Mario Hernig; East Germany
Men's team pursuit	Soviet Union; Konstantin Khrabvzov; Alexandre Krasnov; Valeri Movchan; Sergey Nikitenko	West Germany; Roland Günther; Gerhard Strittmatter; Axel Bokeloh; Michael Marx	East Germany; Detlef Macha; Mario Hernig; Gerald Buder; Volker Winkler
Men's points race	Hans-Joachim Pohl; East Germany	Michael Marcussen; Denmark	Karl Krenauer; Austria
Men's motor-paced	Gaby Minneboo; Netherlands	Mattheus Pronk; Netherlands	Rainer Podlesch; West Germany
Men's tandem	Czechoslovakia; Ivan Kučírek; Pavel Martínek	West Germany; Dieter Giebken; Fredy Schmidtke	Netherlands; Sjaak Pieters; Tom Vrolijk
Women's Events
Women's sprint	Connie Paraskevin; United States	Sheila Young; United States	Claudia Lommatzsch; West Germany
Women's individual pursuit	Rebecca Twigg; United States	Connie Carpenter; United States	Jeannie Longo; France

== Medal table ==
Rank	Nation	Gold	Silver	Bronze	Total
1	East Germany (RDA)	2	3	3	8
2	United States (USA)	2	2	0	4
3	Netherlands (NED)	2	1	1	4
4	Soviet Union (URS)	2	0	1	3
5	West Germany (FRG)	1	3	2	6
6	Canada (CAN)	1	1	0	2
7	France (FRA)	1	0	2	3
8	Japan (JPN)	1	0	1	2
9	Czechoslovakia (TCH)	1	0	0	1
9	Switzerland (SUI)	1	0	0	1
11	Australia (AUS)	0	2	0	2
11	Denmark (DEN)	0	2	0	2
13	Italy (ITA)	0	0	2	2
14	Austria (AUT)	0	0	1	1
14	Liechtenstein (LIE)	0	0	1	1
Totals (15 entries)		14	14	14	42
