= 1984 UCI Track Cycling World Championships =

Cyclist world championship

- Venue: Barcelona, Catalonia, Spain
- Date: 28–31 August 1984
- Velodrome: Velòdrom d'Horta
- Events: 9

The 1984 UCI Track Cycling World Championships were the World Championship for track cycling. They took place in Barcelona, Catalonia, Spain in 1984. Due to the 1984 Summer Olympics only nine events were contested, 7 for men (5 for professionals, 2 for amateurs) and 2 for women.

In the same period, the 1984 UCI Road World Championships were also organized in Barcelona.

== Medal summary ==
| Event | Gold | Silver | Bronze |
|---|---|---|---|
Men's Elite Events
| Men's keirin | Robert Dill-Bundi; Switzerland | Ottavio Dazzan; Italy | Urs Freuler; Switzerland |
| Men's sprint | Kōichi Nakano; Japan | Ottavio Dazzan; Italy | Yavé Cahard; France |
| Men's individual pursuit | Hans-Henrik Ørsted; Denmark | Tony Doyle; Great Britain | Jean-Luc Vandenbroucke; Belgium |
| Men's points race | Urs Freuler; Switzerland | Gary Sutton; Australia | Henry Rinklin; West Germany |
| Men's motor-paced | Horst Schütz; West Germany | Max Hürzeler; Switzerland | Constant Tourné; Belgium |
Men's Amateur Events
| Men's motor-paced | Jan de Nijs; Netherlands | Roberto Dotti; Italy | Ralf Stambula; West Germany |
| Men's tandem | West Germany; Franck Weber; Jürgen Greil | France; Philippe Vernet; Franck Depine | Italy; Vincenzo Ceci; Gabriele Sella |
Women's Events
| Women's sprint | Connie Paraskevin; United States | Erika Salumäe; Soviet Union | Zhou Suying; China |
| Women's individual pursuit | Rebecca Twigg; United States | Jeannie Longo; France | Rossella Galbiati; Italy |

== Medal table ==
| Rank | Nation | Gold | Silver | Bronze | Total |
|---|---|---|---|---|---|
| 1 | Switzerland (SUI) | 2 | 1 | 1 | 4 |
| 2 | West Germany (FRG) | 2 | 0 | 2 | 4 |
| 3 | United States (USA) | 2 | 0 | 0 | 2 |
| 4 | Denmark (DEN) | 1 | 0 | 0 | 1 |
| 4 | Japan (JPN) | 1 | 0 | 0 | 1 |
| 4 | Netherlands (NED) | 1 | 0 | 0 | 1 |
| 7 | Italy (ITA) | 0 | 3 | 2 | 5 |
| 8 | France (FRA) | 0 | 2 | 1 | 3 |
| 9 | Australia (AUS) | 0 | 1 | 0 | 1 |
| 9 | Great Britain (GBR) | 0 | 1 | 0 | 1 |
| 9 | Soviet Union (URS) | 0 | 1 | 0 | 1 |
| 12 | Belgium (BEL) | 0 | 0 | 2 | 2 |
| 13 | China (CHN) | 0 | 0 | 1 | 1 |
| Totals (13 entries) | | 9 | 9 | 9 | 27 |
