= Sandra de Neef =

Dutch cyclist (born 1959)

Personal information
- Born: Rotterdam, the Netherlands

Cycling career
- Sport: Cycling
- Disciplines: Track cycling Road cycling
- Role: Rider
- Rider type: sprinter

Sandra de Neef (born 19 March 1959 in Rotterdam) is a Dutch female track cyclist and Road cyclist. She became two times national champion in the sprint (1980 and 1983) and national champion in the omnium (1981). She competed at three track cycling world championships (1980, 1981 and 1982) in the sprint event.

== Career ==
=== Early years ===
After finishing school she wanted to sport, but didn't know which one. She didn't like football and athletics. She fell in love with cycling after seeing 'Ahoy op Zondag' (Ahoy on Sunday), a cycling competition in Rotterdam Ahoy and the day afterwards she joined the cycling club of Ahoy. She got a bike from her uncle Ton Okhuijzen, who maintained the bicycles of the club. She started riding on the road and trained two times a day. In her first year she needed to get used to cycling and didn't perform very well. The year afterwards she was much better and was able to bijhouden elite riders like Keetie Hage and Petra de Bruin. It became clear that she had outstanding sprint capacities.

=== Track cycling ===
Due to her good sprint capacities she started riding on the track. In 1980, after three years having been riding a bicycle she won her first national title in the sprint by outsprinting Truus van der Plaat in the finals. The year afterwards she became national omnium champion in 'her own' Ahoy and she won the national title in the sprint in 1983.

==== World Championships ====
At the world championships not that successful. She competed in the sprint event at the 1980 UCI Track Cycling World Championships in Besançon, 1981 UCI Track Cycling World Championships in Brno and 1982 UCI Track Cycling World Championships in Zürich. In 1980 she was disqualified after her Chinese opponent said De Neef had ridden her against the fence. This was denied however by De Neef, but an official protest from the coach Jan Derksen couldn't change the disqualification. The year later she lost in the first round from a Czech rider. Due to the hair on the legs of the Czech athlete De Neef responded after the race "she probably has swallowed a bit too much hormones".

=== Road cycling ===
Besides track cycling she also performed well on the road. She won criteriums, finished second a race in 's-Gravenpolder in 1982 and third at the Batavus Lenterace in Heerenveen in 1983.

== See also ==
- Netherlands at the 1981 UCI Track Cycling World Championships
