= Erica Oomen =

Dutch cyclist

Personal information
- Born: Schijndel, the Netherlands

Cycling career
- Sport: Cycling
- Discipline: Track cycling
- Role: Rider
- Rider type: sprinter

Erica Oomen is a Dutch female track cyclist who lived in Schijndel. She was selected, together with Sandra de Neef, to represent the Netherlands in the sprint event at the 1981 UCI Track Cycling World Championships.

== Personal ==
In the mid–1980s she moved to Helmond.
