= Connie Carpenter-Phinney =

American cyclist and speed skater

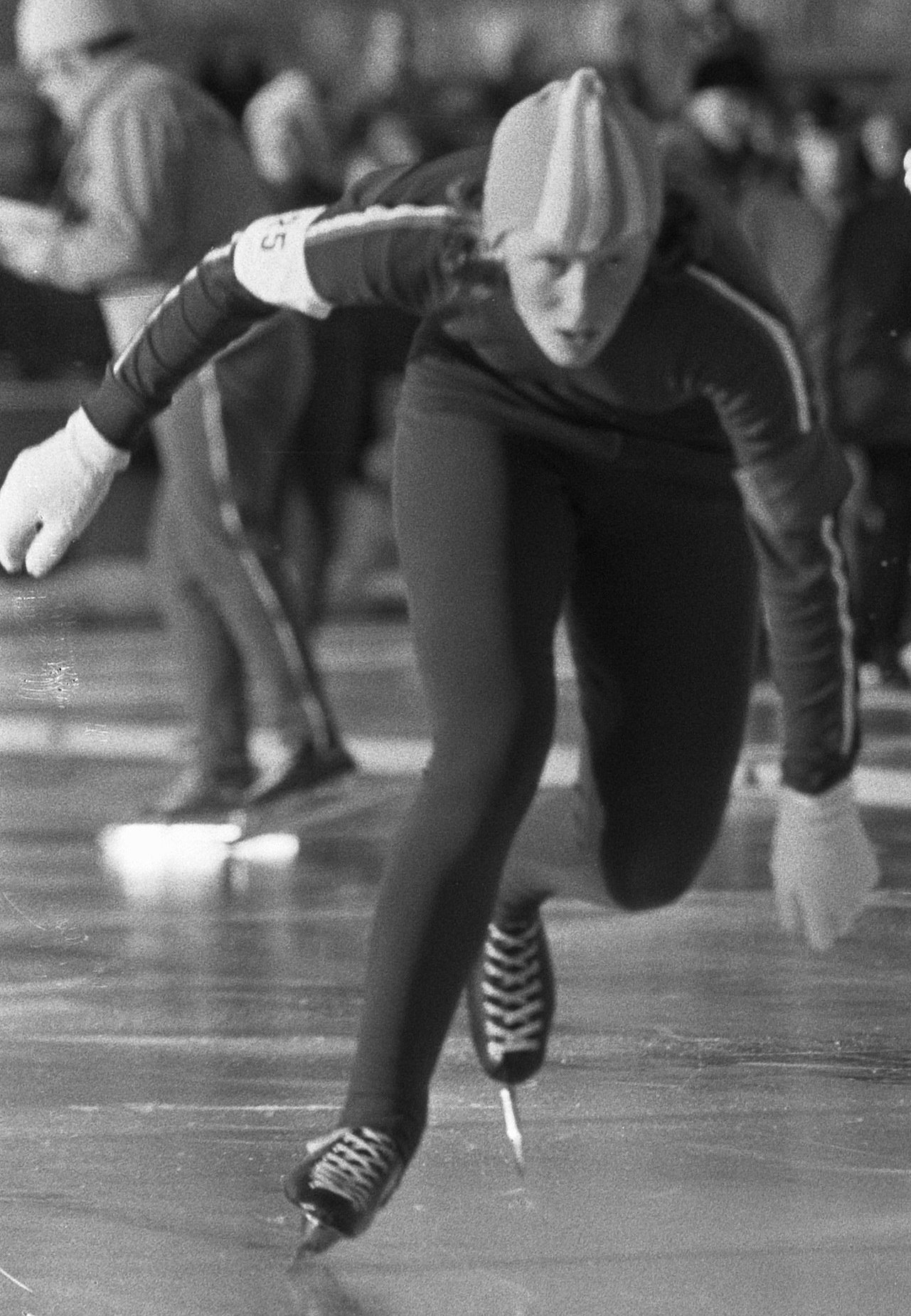
- Carpenter-Phinney at the 1974 World Allround Speed Skating Championships for Women

Personal information
- Full name: Helen Constance Carpenter-Phinney
- Born: February 26, 1957 (age 69) Madison, Wisconsin, U.S.

Cycling career
- Sport: Cycling
- Disciplines: Road, track, and speed skating
- Role: Rider
Medal record
Representing the United States
Women's road cycling
Olympic Games
Gold medal – first place	1984 Los Angeles	Individual road race
UCI Road World Championships
Silver medal – second place	1977 San Cristóbal	Road race
Bronze medal – third place	1981 Prague	Road race
Women's track cycling
UCI Track World Championships
Gold medal – first place	1983 Zürich	Individual pursuit
Silver medal – second place	1982 Leicester	Individual pursuit

Connie Carpenter-Phinney (born February 26, 1957) is an American retired racing cyclist and speed skater who won four medals in World Cycling Championship competitions (both road and track cycling) in the late 1970s and early 1980s. She was a three-time overall winner of the Coors International Bicycle Classic. She also won the gold medal in the cycling road race at the 1984 Summer Olympics in Los Angeles, as well as twelve U.S. national championships. She remains the youngest American woman to compete at the Winter Olympics.

== Early career ==
Before turning to cycling, Carpenter was a speed skater, one of many athletes who excelled in both sports. As a speed skater, she competed in the 1972 Winter Olympics, where she finished 7th in the 1500m. She was fourteen years old at the time, making her the youngest American female Winter Olympian. Carpenter-Phinney trained with Norwegian coach Finn Halvorsen as part of the US National speed skating team that competed in the 1972 Olympics. Other members of the team included Anne Henning and Sheila Young (Ochowicz).

In 1976, she won the U.S. national overall outdoor title, but an injury prevented her from competing in the Olympics that year. After failing to make the Olympic team in 1976, Carpenter-Phinney began to focus on bicycle racing.

Outside of skating, while a student at the University of California, Berkeley, her athletic career centered on rowing. She was a member of Cal's varsity for two seasons. In 1979, her varsity team finished second nationally, and in 1980 she reached the top of the American collegiate rowing world with a national championship in the varsity four.

== Cycling career ==
Carpenter had trained on a bicycle during the skating off-season, and after the ankle injury in 1976, she began racing on the bike. 1976 was her first season of bicycle racing, and she won the US National Championship by beating former champion Mary Jane "Miji" Reoch. In 1977 and 1979, she also won the U.S. national road and track pursuit championships. She added a pair of national criterium championships to her resume before winning the Olympic gold medal in 1984. 1984 was the first year women's cycling was part of the Olympics; previously it had only been a men's sport. The 79 km race took place on July 29, 1984. She won the race in a sprint over fellow American Rebecca Twigg and European competitors Jeannie Longo and Maria Canins.

She was a three-time overall winner of what was at that time America's premier stage race, the Coors International Bicycle Classic, winning her last overall victory there in 1982.

Carpenter-Phinney was elected to the Wisconsin Athletic Hall of Fame in 2001 and is a member of both the U.S. Bicycling Hall of Fame and the U.S. Olympic Hall of Fame. She was inducted into the Boulder (Colorado) Sports Hall of Fame in 2011.

== Personal life ==
Carpenter-Phinney is married to fellow Olympic medalist and retired professional cyclist Davis Phinney, with whom she has two children, Taylor and Kelsey. As of 2015 she lived in Boulder, Colorado where she was an entrepreneur and also on the board of the Davis Phinney Foundation. Taylor competed at the 2008 and 2012 Olympics. In the 2008 Games, the eighteen-year-old Phinney placed seventh in the individual pursuit. In the 2012 London Games, Taylor earned fourth-place finishes in both the road race and individual time trial. He was a professional cyclist and competed in world-class races such as Paris-Roubaix, Milan-San Remo, and the Tour of California prior to his retirement in 2019.

== Education ==
- BA Physical Education, University of California, Berkeley, 1981
- MS Kinesiology (University of Colorado) 1990
