= Cycling at the 1980 Summer Olympics – Men's sprint =

Men's sprint at the Games of the XXII Olympiad
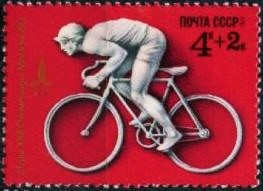
- Soviet stamp commemorating 1980 Olympic cycling
- Venue: Krylatskoye Sports Complex Velodrome
- Dates: 23–26 July
- Competitors: 15 from 15 nations

Medalists
1st place, gold medalist(s)		Lutz Heßlich; East Germany
2nd place, silver medalist(s)		Yavé Cahard; France
3rd place, bronze medalist(s)		Sergei Kopylov; Soviet Union

The men's sprint event at the 1980 Summer Olympics took place on 23–26 July 1980 in Krylatskoye Sports Complex Velodrome. There were 15 competitors from 15 nations, with three additional non-starters. The event was won by Lutz Heßlich of East Germany, the nation's first victory in the men's sprint. Yavé Cahard took silver, extending France's medal streak to five Games despite the retirement of Daniel Morelon (who had medaled in the past four). Sergei Kopylov of the host Soviet Union earned bronze.

== Background ==
This was the 17th appearance of the event, which has been held at every Summer Olympics except 1904 and 1912. The only returning quarterfinalist from 1976 was champion Anton Tkáč of Czechoslovakia. France's Daniel Morelon, who had taken a medal in the last four Games, had retired in 1977. Lutz Heßlich of East Germany was the 1979 world champion and the favorite in Moscow.

Libya and Zimbabwe each made their debut in the men's sprint. France made its 17th appearance, the only nation to have competed at every appearance of the event.

== Competition format ==
This sprint competition involved a series of head-to-head matches. The 1980 competition, despite an even smaller starting field than in 1976 (15 cyclists, down from 18), actually increased the number of rounds back to 10 (from eight in 1976). This format used six main rounds (first round, second round, 1/8 finals, quarterfinals, semifinals, and finals) and three repechages, including a two-round first repechage. Only one cyclist was eliminated after the first three rounds (round 1 and the two-round first repechage).

- Round 1: The 18 entrants were divided into 9 heats of 2 cyclists each; because of three withdrawals, three of the heats were walkovers. The winner of each heat advanced directly to round 2 (9 cyclists), while all other cyclists who competed were sent to the first repechage semifinals (6 cyclists).
- First repechage semifinals: The 6 cyclists were divided into 3 heats, each with 2 cyclists. The winner of each heat advanced to round 2 (3 cyclists), while the loser went to the first repechage final (3 cyclists).
- First repechage final: The 3 cyclists all competed together in the first repechage final; the top two advanced to round 2 while the last-placed cyclist was the first man eliminated from the competition.
- Round 2: The 14 cyclists were divided into 7 heats of 2 cyclists each. The winner of each heat advanced to the 1/8 finals (7 cyclists) while losers went to the second repechage (because of one withdrawal, there were only 6 cyclists that went to the repechage).
- Second repechage: The 6 cyclists competed in 3 heats of 2 cyclists. Winners advanced to the 1/8 finals, losers were eliminated.
- 1/8 finals: The 10 cyclists who advanced through the first rounds (including repechage) competed in a 1/8 finals round. There were 5 heats in this round, with 2 cyclists in each. The top cyclist in each heat advanced to the quarterfinals (5 cyclists), while the loser in each heat went to the third repechage (5 cyclists).
- Third repechage: This repechage featured two heats, one of two cyclists and one of three cyclists. Only the last-placed man in each heat was eliminated; the winners advanced to the quarterfinals along with the second-place cyclist in the three-rider heat.
- Quarterfinals: Beginning with the quarterfinals, all matches were one-on-one competitions and were held in best-of-three format. There were 4 quarterfinals, with the winner of each advancing to the semifinals and the loser going to the fifth-eighth classification race.
- Semifinals: The two semifinals provided for advancement to the gold medal final for winners and to the bronze medal final for losers.
- Finals: Both a gold medal final and a bronze medal final were held, as well as a classification final for fifth through eighth places for quarterfinal losers.

== Records ==
The records for the sprint are 200 metre flying time trial records, kept for the qualifying round in later Games as well as for the finish of races.

World record	Omar Pkhakadze (URS)	10.61	Mexico City, Mexico	22 October 1967
Olympic record	Leijn Loevesijn (NED)	10.66	Mexico City, Mexico	18 October 1968

Sergei Kopylov recorded 10.55 seconds in the fourth heat of round 2, 10.56 seconds, in the first race of the bronze medal match, and 10.47 seconds in the second race of the bronze medal match.

== Schedule ==
All times are Moscow Time (UTC+3)

Date	Time	Round
Wednesday, 23 July 1980	18:00	Round 1 First repechage semifinals First repechage final Round 2 Second repechage
Thursday, 24 July 1980	18:00	1/8 finals Third repechage Quarterfinals
Friday, 25 July 1980	19:00	Semifinals
Saturday, 26 July 1980	16:00	Finals

== Results ==
=== Round 1 ===
==== Round 1 heat 1 ====
Rank	Cyclist	Nation	Time	Notes
1	Lutz Heßlich	East Germany	11.42	Q
2	John Musa	Zimbabwe		R

==== Round 1 heat 2 ====
Rank	Cyclist	Nation	Time	Notes
1	Anton Tkáč	Czechoslovakia	10.86	Q
2	Fawzi Abdussalam	Libya		R

==== Round 1 heat 3 ====
Rank	Cyclist	Nation	Time	Notes
1	Yavé Cahard	France	10.70	Q
2	Terrence Tinsley	Great Britain		R

==== Round 1 heat 4 ====
Rank	Cyclist	Nation	Time	Notes
1	Sergei Kopylov	Soviet Union	wo	Q
—	Paul Ahokas	Finland	DNS	

==== Round 1 heat 5 ====
Rank	Cyclist	Nation	Time	Notes
1	Ottavio Dazzan	Italy	wo	Q
—	Juan Palacios	Ecuador	DNS	

==== Round 1 heat 6 ====
Rank	Cyclist	Nation	Time	Notes
1	Benedykt Kocot	Poland	wo	Q
—	Hans Fischer	Brazil	DNS	

==== Round 1 heat 7 ====
Rank	Cyclist	Nation	Time	Notes
1	Henrik Salée	Denmark	11.24	Q
2	James Joseph	Guyana		R

==== Round 1 heat 8 ====
Rank	Cyclist	Nation	Time	Notes
1	Heinz Isler	Switzerland	10.98	Q
2	László Morcz	Hungary		R

==== Round 1 heat 9 ====
Rank	Cyclist	Nation	Time	Notes
1	Kenrick Tucker	Australia	11.35	Q
2	Lau Veldt	Netherlands		R

=== First repechage semifinals ===
==== First repechage semifinal 1 ====
Rank	Cyclist	Nation	Time	Notes
1	Terrence Tinsley	Great Britain	11.62	Q
2	John Musa	Zimbabwe		R

==== First repechage semifinal 2 ====
Rank	Cyclist	Nation	Time	Notes
1	James Joseph	Guyana	11.08	Q
2	Fawzi Abdussalam	Libya		R

==== First repechage semifinal 3 ====
Rank	Cyclist	Nation	Time	Notes
1	Lau Veldt	Netherlands	11.38	Q
2	Fawzi Abdussalam	Libya		R

=== First repechage final ===
Rank	Cyclist	Nation	Time	Notes
1	László Morcz	Hungary	11.49	Q
2	Fawzi Abdussalam	Libya		Q
3	John Musa	Zimbabwe		

=== Round 2 ===
==== Round 2 heat 1 ====
Rank	Cyclist	Nation	Time	Notes
1	Lutz Heßlich	East Germany	wo	Q
—	Fawzi Abdussalam	Libya	DNS	

==== Round 2 heat 2 ====
Rank	Cyclist	Nation	Time	Notes
1	Anton Tkáč	Czechoslovakia	11.23	Q
2	László Morcz	Hungary		R

==== Round 2 heat 3 ====
Rank	Cyclist	Nation	Time	Notes
1	Yeve Cahard	France	10.87	Q
2	Lau Veldt	Netherlands		R

==== Round 2 heat 4 ====
Rank	Cyclist	Nation	Time	Notes
1	Sergei Kopylov	Soviet Union	10.55	Q, WR
2	James Joseph	Guyana		R

==== Round 2 heat 5 ====
Rank	Cyclist	Nation	Time	Notes
1	Ottavio Dazzan	Italy	11.07	Q
2	Terrence Tinsley	Great Britain		R

==== Round 2 heat 6 ====
Rank	Cyclist	Nation	Time	Notes
1	Heinz Isler	Switzerland	11.47	Q
2	Henrik Salée	Denmark		R

==== Round 2 heat 7 ====
Rank	Cyclist	Nation	Time	Notes
1	Kenrick Tucker	Australia	10.93	Q
2	Benedykt Kocot	Poland		R

=== Second repechage ===
==== Second repechage heat 1 ====
Rank	Cyclist	Nation	Time	Notes
1	Henrik Salée	Denmark	10.94	Q
2	László Morcz	Hungary		

==== Second repechage heat 2 ====
Rank	Cyclist	Nation	Time	Notes
1	Lau Veldt	Netherlands	11.04	Q
2	Benedykt Kocot	Poland		

==== Second repechage heat 3 ====
Rank	Cyclist	Nation	Time	Notes
1	James Joseph	Guyana	No time	Q
—	Terrence Tinsley	Great Britain	DNF	

=== 1/8 finals ===
==== 1/8 final 1 ====
Rank	Cyclist	Nation	Time	Notes
1	Lutz Heßlich	East Germany	10.75	Q
2	James Joseph	Guyana		R

==== 1/8 final 2 ====
Rank	Cyclist	Nation	Time	Notes
1	Anton Tkáč	Czechoslovakia	11.19	Q
2	Lau Veldt	Netherlands		R

==== 1/8 final 3 ====
Rank	Cyclist	Nation	Time	Notes
1	Yavé Cahard	France	10.94	Q
2	Henrik Salée	Denmark		R

==== 1/8 final 4 ====
Rank	Cyclist	Nation	Time	Notes
1	Sergei Kopylov	Soviet Union	10.95	Q
2	Kenrick Tucker	Australia		R

==== 1/8 final 5 ====
Rank	Cyclist	Nation	Time	Notes
1	Ottavio Dazzan	Italy	10.95	Q
2	Heinz Isler	Switzerland		R

=== Third repechage ===
==== Third repechage heat 1 ====
Rank	Cyclist	Nation	Time	Notes
1	Heinz Isler	Switzerland	10.95	Q
2	Lau Veldt	Netherlands		

==== Third repechage heat 2 ====
Rank	Cyclist	Nation	Time	Notes
1	Kenrick Tucker	Australia	11.49	Q
2	Henrik Salée	Denmark		Q
3	James Joseph	Guyana		

=== Quarterfinals ===
==== Quarterfinal 1 ====
Rank	Cyclist	Nation	Race 1	Race 2	Race 3	Notes
1	Lutz Heßlich	East Germany	10.95	10.96	—N/a	Q
2	Henrik Salée	Denmark			—N/a	C

==== Quarterfinal 2 ====
Rank	Cyclist	Nation	Race 1	Race 2	Race 3	Notes
1	Anton Tkáč	Czechoslovakia	10.94	10.70	—N/a	Q
2	Kenrick Tucker	Australia			—N/a	C

==== Quarterfinal 3 ====
Rank	Cyclist	Nation	Race 1	Race 2	Race 3	Notes
1	Yavé Cahard	France	11.05	11.04	—N/a	Q
2	Heinz Isler	Switzerland			—N/a	C

==== Quarterfinal 4 ====
Rank	Cyclist	Nation	Race 1	Race 2	Race 3	Notes
1	Sergei Kopylov	Soviet Union	10.76	11.00	—N/a	Q
2	Ottavio Dazzan	Italy			—N/a	C

=== Semifinals ===
==== Semifinal 1 ====
Rank	Cyclist	Nation	Race 1	Race 2	Race 3	Notes
1	Lutz Heßlich	East Germany	11.60	11.24	—N/a	Q
2	Sergei Kopylov	Soviet Union			—N/a	B

==== Semifinal 2 ====
Rank	Cyclist	Nation	Race 1	Race 2	Race 3	Notes
1	Yavé Cahard	France		11.28	10.66	Q
2	Anton Tkáč	Czechoslovakia	11.25			B

=== Finals ===
==== Classification 5–8 ====
Rank	Cyclist	Nation	Time 200 m
5	Henrik Salée	Denmark	11.36
6	Heinz Isler	Switzerland	
7	Kenrick Tucker	Australia	
8	Ottavio Dazzan	Italy	

==== Bronze medal match ====
Rank	Cyclist	Nation	Race 1	Race 2	Race 3
3rd place, bronze medalist(s)	Sergei Kopylov	Soviet Union	10.56 WR	10.47 WR	—N/a
4	Anton Tkáč	Czechoslovakia			—N/a

==== Final ====
Rank	Cyclist	Nation	Race 1	Race 2	Race 3
1st place, gold medalist(s)	Lutz Heßlich	East Germany	11.40		12.01
2nd place, silver medalist(s)	Yavé Cahard	France		10.86	
