= Lothar Thoms =

East German cyclist (1956–2017)

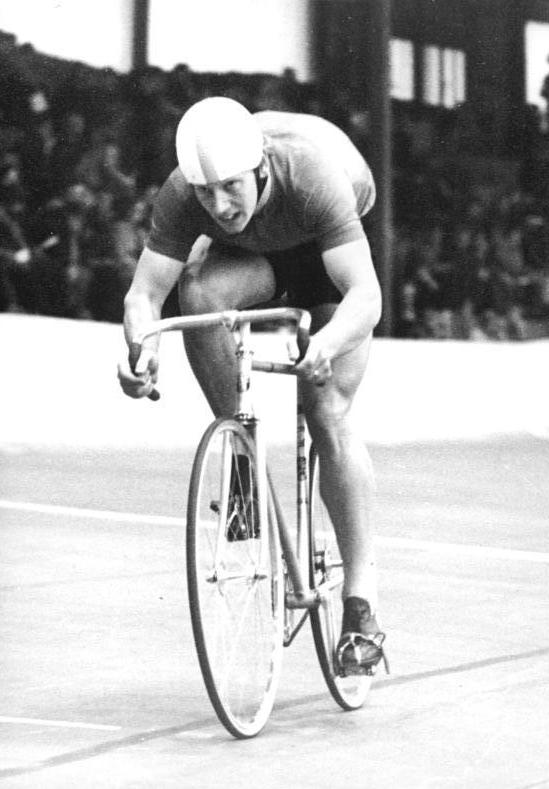
- Lothar Thoms

Personal information
- Born: 18 May 1956 Guben, Brandenburg, East Germany
- Died: 5 November 2017 (aged 61)

Cycling career
- Sport: Cycling
Medal record
Men's cycling
Representing East Germany
Olympic Games
Gold medal – first place	1980 Moscow	1 km time trial
Track World Championships
Gold medal – first place	1977 San Cristóbal	1 km time trial
Gold medal – first place	1978 Munich	1 km time trial
Gold medal – first place	1979 Amsterdam	1 km time trial
Gold medal – first place	1981 Brno	1 km time trial
Silver medal – second place	1982 Leicester	1 km time trial
Bronze medal – third place	1983 Zurich	1 km time trial

Lothar Thoms (18 May 1956 – 5 November 2017) was a track cyclist from East Germany, who represented his native country at the 1980 Summer Olympics in Moscow, Russia. There he won the gold medal in the men's 1 km time trial by marking a new indoor world record. His time of 1'02"955 was more than 2 sec better than the previous record of the same year held by Urs Freuler. He also won four gold medals in the 1 km time trial (amateurs) at the 1977, 1978, 1979 and 1981 world championships respectively, thus winning all kilo events at the major international competitions in five consecutive years. In 1981 he was elected East German Sportspersonality of the year.

Awards
Preceded by (East Germany) Waldemar Cierpinski	East German Sportsman of the Year; 1981	Succeeded by (East Germany) Bernd Drogan
