= 1976 World Juniors Track Cycling Championships =

- Venue: Liège, Belgium
- Date: August 1976

The 1976 World Juniors Track Cycling Championships were the second annual Junior World Championships for track cycling held in Liège, Belgium.

The Championships had four events for men only, Sprint, Points race, Individual pursuit and Team pursuit. Robert Dill-Bundi became the first cyclist to retain a world junior title, and the first to win two gold medals in the championships.

== Events ==
Event	Gold	Silver	Bronze
Men's events
Sprint	Lutz Heßlich; East Germany	Ralf-Guido Kuschy; East Germany	Mar Pavirani; Italy
Points race	Rüdiger Leitlof; West Germany	Jens Schroder; Denmark	P Torresan; Italy
Individual pursuit	Robert Dill-Bundi; Switzerland	Gerald Mortag; East Germany	Mike Richards; New Zealand
Team pursuit	Gerald Mortag; Detlef Macha; Jürgen Lippold; Olaf Hill; East Germany	Silvestro Milani; Roberto Bonanzi; Dante Morandi; Domenico Pellegrino; Italy	Nikolai Makarov; Nikolai Seduro; Peter Tchevardov; Valeri Uraev; Soviet Union

== Medal table ==
* Host nation (Belgium)

Rank	Nation	Gold	Silver	Bronze	Total
1	East Germany (GDR)	2	2	0	4
2	Switzerland (SUI)	1	0	0	1
2	West Germany (FRG)	1	0	0	1
4	Italy (ITA)	0	1	2	3
5	Denmark (DEN)	0	1	0	1
6	New Zealand (NZL)	0	0	1	1
6	Soviet Union (URS)	0	0	1	1
Totals (7 entries)		4	4	4	12
