= 1980 UCI Track Cycling World Championships =

Cycling competition

- Venue: Besançon, France
- Date: 3–7 September 1980
- Velodrome: Stade Léo Lagrange
- Events: 10

The 1980 UCI Track Cycling World Championships were the World Championship for track cycling. They took place in Besançon, France in 1980. Due to the 1980 Summer Olympics only ten events were contested, 8 for men (5 for professionals, 3 for amateurs) and 2 for women.

In the same period, the 1980 UCI Road World Championships were organized in Sallanches.

== Medal summary ==
Event	Gold	Silver	Bronze
Men's Elite Events
Men's keirin	Danny Clark; Australia	Daniel Morelon; France	Niels Fredborg; Denmark
Men's sprint	Kōichi Nakano; Japan	Masahiko Ozaki; Japan	Daniel Morelon; France
Men's individual pursuit	Tony Doyle; Great Britain	Herman Ponsteen; Netherlands	Hans-Henrik Ørsted; Denmark
Men's points race	Stan Tourné; Belgium	Giovanni Mantovani; Italy	Heinz Betz; West Germany
Men's motor-paced	Wilfried Peffgen; West Germany	René Kos; Netherlands	Bruno Vicino; Italy
Men's Amateur Events
Men's points race	Gary Sutton; Australia	Viktor Manakov; Soviet Union	Josef Kristen; West Germany
Men's motor-paced	Gaby Minneboo; Netherlands	Mattheus Pronk; Netherlands	Bartolome Caldentey; Spain
Men's tandem	Czechoslovakia; Ivan Kučírek; Pavel Martinek	France; Yvon Cloarec; Franck Depine	Italy; Giorgio Rossi; Floriano Finamore
Women's Events
Women's sprint	Sue Novara; United States	Galina Tsareva; Soviet Union	Claudia Lommatzsch; West Germany
Women's individual pursuit	Nadezhda Kibardina; Soviet Union	Karen Strong; Canada	Petra De Bruin; Netherlands

== Medal table ==
Rank	Nation	Gold	Silver	Bronze	Total
1	Australia (AUS)	2	0	0	2
2	Netherlands (NED)	1	3	1	5
3	Soviet Union (URS)	1	2	0	3
4	Japan (JPN)	1	1	0	2
5	West Germany (FRG)	1	0	3	4
6	Belgium (BEL)	1	0	0	1
6	Czechoslovakia (TCH)	1	0	0	1
6	Great Britain (GBR)	1	0	0	1
6	United States (USA)	1	0	0	1
10	France (FRA)	0	2	1	3
11	Italy (ITA)	0	1	2	3
12	Canada (CAN)	0	1	0	1
13	Denmark (DEN)	0	0	2	2
14	Spain (ESP)	0	0	1	1
Totals (14 entries)		10	10	10	30

== See also ==
- 1980 UCI Road World Championships
- UCI Track Cycling World Championships – Men's keirin
