= Lau Veldt =

Dutch track cyclist (born 1953)

Personal information
- Full name: Laurens "Lau" Veldt
- Born: 18 June 1953 Amsterdam, Netherlands
- Height: 178 cm (5 ft 10 in)
- Weight: 80 kg (176 lb)

Cycling career
- Sport: Cycling
- Discipline: Track cycling
Medal record
World Championships
Bronze medal – third place	1978 Munich	Tandem

Laurens "Lau" Veldt (born 18 June 1953, in Amsterdam) is a track cyclist from the Netherlands. He won the bronze medal at the 1978 UCI Track Cycling World Championships in the men's tandam together with Sjaak Pieters. He competed in the men's sprint at the 1980 Summer Olympics.

Lau is the father of cyclist Tim Veldt.

== See also ==
- List of Dutch Olympic cyclists
- List of people from Amsterdam
