= Ton Vrolijk =

Dutch cyclist

Personal information
- Born: 9 February 1958 The Hague, Netherlands

Cycling career
- Sport: Cycling
- Discipline: Track cycling
Medal record
World Championships
| Bronze medal – third place | 1982 Leicester | Tandem |

Ton Vrolijk (born 1958) is a track cyclist from the Netherlands. He won the bronze medal at the 1982 UCI Track Cycling World Championships in Leicester in the men's tandam together with Sjaak Pieters. The year before, he competed at the 1981 UCI Track Cycling World Championships in the men's sprint and men's tandem (with Sjaak Pieters). Vrolijk also rode on the road and won in 1980 the 100 km criterium in his home town, The Hague.
