= Alain Bondue =

French cyclist (born 1959)

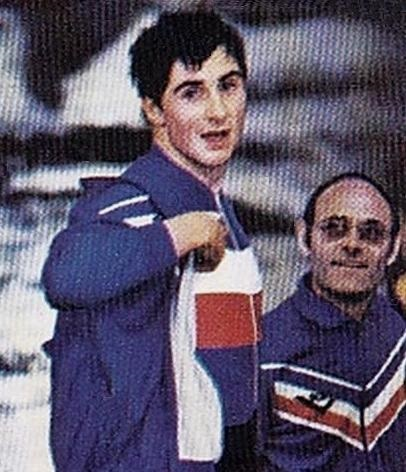
- Bondue in 1979

Personal information
- Full name: Alain Bondue
- Born: 8 April 1959 (age 67) Roubaix, France

Cycling career
- Sport: Cycling
- Disciplines: Road and track
- Role: Rider

Professional teams
- 1980–1985: La Redoute–Motobécane
- 1986–1987: Système U

Major wins
- Vuelta a España, 1 stage
Medal record
Men's track cycling
Representing France
Olympic Games
Silver medal – second place	1980 Moscow	Individual pursuit
World Championships
Gold medal – first place	1981 Brno	Professional individual pursuit
Gold medal – first place	1982 Leicester	Professional individual pursuit
Bronze medal – third place	1979 Amsterdam	Amateur individual pursuit

Alain Bondue (born 8 April 1959) is a former racing cyclist from France. He competed for France in the 1980 Summer Olympics held in Moscow, Soviet Union in the individual pursuit event where he finished in second place.
