= Henrik Salée =

Danish cyclist

Personal information
- Born: 28 November 1955 (age 70) Copenhagen, Denmark

Cycling career
- Sport: Cycling

Henrik Salée (born 28 November 1955) is a Danish former cyclist. He competed in the sprint event at the 1980 Summer Olympics.
