= Hans-Henrik Ørsted =

Danish cyclist (born 1954)

Personal information
- Full name: Hans-Henrik Ørsted
- Born: 13 December 1954 (age 71) Grenå, Denmark

Cycling career
- Sport: Cycling
- Discipline: Track
- Role: Rider
Medal record
Men's track cycling
Representing Denmark
Olympic Games
Bronze medal – third place	1980 Moscow	Pursuit
World Championships
Gold medal – first place	1984 Barcelona	Professional pursuit
Gold medal – first place	1985 Bassano del Grappa	Professional pursuit
Gold medal – first place	1987 Vienna	Professional pursuit
Silver medal – second place	1981 Brno	Professional pursuit
Silver medal – second place	1982 Leicester	Professional pursuit
Silver medal – second place	1986 Colorado Springs	Professional pursuit
Bronze medal – third place	1980 Besançon	Professional pursuit
Bronze medal – third place	1983 Zürich	Professional pursuit

Hans-Henrik Ørsted (born 13 December 1954) is a Danish former professional track cyclist and multi-medalist in the Olympics and World Championships at pursuit. He raced in many indoor Six-day racing events in Europe.

He turned professional following the 1980 Summer Olympics, where he won a bronze medal.

At the World Championships as a professional, he won 3 gold medals, 3 silver, and 2 bronze.

== Palmarès ==
1977
1st, Pursuit, National Track Championships, Copenhagen

1978
1st, Pursuit, National Track Championships, Århus
1st, Points race, National Track Championships, Århus

1980
3rd, Pursuit, Olympic Games, Moscow
3rd, Professional Pursuit, UCI Track Cycling World Championships, Besançon
1st, Pursuit, National Track Championships, Odense

1981
1st, Six Days of Dortmund (with Gert Frank)
1st, Madison, European Track Championships (with Gert Frank)
2nd, Professional Pursuit, UCI Track Cycling World Championships, Brno
3rd, Grand Prix des Nations
1st, Six Days of Herning (with Gert Frank)

1982
2nd, Professional Pursuit, UCI Track Cycling World Championships, Leicester
1st, Nienburg

1983
1st, Madison, European Track Championships (with Gert Frank)
1st, Six Days of Herning (with Gert Frank)
1st, Odense
3rd, Professional Pursuit, UCI Track Cycling World Championships, Zürich

1984
1st, Six Days of Ghent (with Gert Frank)
1st, Six Days of Munich (with Gert Frank)
1st, Professional Pursuit, UCI Track Cycling World Championships, Barcelona

1985
1st, Six Days of Berlin (with Danny Clark)
1st, Six Days of Copenhagen (with Gert Frank)
1st, Professional Pursuit, UCI Track Cycling World Championships, Bassano del Grappa
1st, Trofeo Baracchi (with Francesco Moser)

1986
2nd, Professional Pursuit, UCI Track Cycling World Championships, Colorado Springs
Danmark Rundt

1st, Prologue
1st, Stage 5b

1987
1st, Professional Pursuit, UCI Track Cycling World Championships, Vienna

1988
1st, Six Days of Copenhagen (with Roman Hermann)
