= Kelvin Poole =

Australian cyclist (born 1958)

Personal information
- Born: 27 March 1958 (age 68)

Cycling career
- Sport: Cycling

Kelvin Laurence Poole (27 March 1958) is an Australian former cyclist. He competed in the individual and team pursuit events at the 1980 Summer Olympics.
