= Robert Dill-Bundi =

Swiss cyclist (1958–2024)

Personal information
- Born: 18 November 1958 Chippis, Valais, Switzerland
- Died: 16 September 2024 (aged 65)

Cycling career
- Sport: Cycling
- Disciplines: Track; Road
- Role: Rider

Professional teams
- 1981: Sem–France Loire–Campagnolo
- 1982–1986: Hoonved–Bottecchia
- 1987–1988: Diner's Club

Major wins
- Grand Tours Giro d'Italia 1 individual stage (1982)
Medal record
Men's track cycling
Representing Switzerland
Olympic Games
Gold medal – first place	1980 Moscow	Individual pursuit
World Championships
Gold medal – first place	1984 Barcelona	Keirin
Silver medal – second place	1983 Zürich	Individual pursuit
Amateur World Championships
Bronze medal – third place	1977 San Cristóbal	Team pursuit
Bronze medal – third place	1978 Munich	Team pursuit

Robert Dill-Bundi (18 November 1958 – 16 September 2024) was a Swiss professional racing cyclist. He competed for Switzerland in the 1980 Summer Olympics held in Moscow, Soviet Union in the individual pursuit event where he finished in first place.

Dill-Bundi died on 16 September 2024, at the age of 65.

== Major results ==
=== Track ===
1975
1st Individual pursuit, World Junior Championships
1976
1st Individual pursuit, World Junior Championships
1977
2nd Team pursuit, UCI Amateur World Championships
1978
1st Individual pursuit, National Championships
2nd Team pursuit, UCI Amateur World Championships
1979
1st Individual pursuit, National Championships
1980
1st Individual pursuit, Olympic Games
1st Individual pursuit, National Championships
1981
1st Keirin, UCI World Championships
1st Individual pursuit, National Championships
1982
National Championships

1st Individual pursuit
1st Kilometer

1st Six Days of Zürich (with Urs Freuler)
2nd Omnium, European Championships
1983
National Championships

1st Individual pursuit
1st Kilometer

2nd Individual pursuit, UCI World Championships

=== Road ===
1975
1st Road race, National Junior Championships
1st Overall Tour du Pays de Vaud
1982
1st Stage 19 Giro d'Italia
1983
1st Prologue Tour de Romandie
