= Dainis Liepiņš =

Soviet-Latvian cyclist (1962–2020)

Personal information
- Born: 13 August 1962 USSR
- Died: 27 November 2020 (aged 58)

Cycling career
- Sport: Cycling

Dainis Liepiņš (13 August 1962 – 27 November 2020) was a Soviet-Latvian cyclist.

He won several awards in "junior" categories in the early 1980s.

== Awards ==
- Winner of the 1979 World Juniors Track Cycling Championships Team Pursuit with Gaidis Liepiņš, Vladimir Baluk, and Yuri Petrov
- Winner of the 1980 World Juniors Track Cycling Championships Team Pursuit with Andris Ločmelis, Martins Palejs, and Sergei Agupov
- Silver Medal at the 1981 UCI Track Cycling World Championships for Amateur Individual Pursuit
- 2nd place in the 1981 Soviet Union Track Cycling Championships Team Pursuit with Vitaly Petrakov
- 3rd place in the 1981 Soviet Union Track Cycling Championships Individual Pursuit
- 3rd place in the 1982 Presidential Cycling Tour of Turkey
- Bronze Medal at the 1983 UCI Track Cycling World Championships for Amateur Individual Pursuit
- 3rd place at the 1983 Soviet Union Track Cycling Championships Team Pursuit
- 3rd place in the 1983 Niedersachsen-Rundfahrt
