= Ottavio Dazzan =

Italian cyclist (1958–2024)

Octavio Dazzan
Personal information
- Born: 2 January 1958 Quilmes, Argentina
- Died: 16 January 2024 (aged 66) Quilmes, Argentina

Cycling career
- Sport: Cycling
- Discipline: Track
- Role: Rider
- Rider type: Sprinter
Medal record
Men's track cycling
Representing Italy
World Championships
Silver medal – second place	1984 Barcelona	Keirin
Silver medal – second place	1984 Barcelona	Sprint
Silver medal – second place	1988 Ghent	Keirin
Silver medal – second place	1985 Bassano del Grappa	Keirin
Bronze medal – third place	1983 Zürich	Sprint
Bronze medal – third place	1985 Bassano del Grappa	Sprint

Octavio Dazzan (2 January 1958 – 16 January 2024) was an Argentine-born Italian cyclist. He competed in the sprint event at the 1980 Summer Olympics.

Dazzan died on 16 January 2024, at the age of 66.
