= Sergei Kopylov =

Personal information
- Born: 29 July 1960 (age 66) Tula, Soviet Union

Cycling career
- Sport: Cycling
Medal record
Men's cycling
Representing Soviet Union
Olympic Games
Bronze medal – third place	1980 Moscow	Sprint
Track World Championships
Gold medal – first place	1981 Brno	Sprint (amateur)
Gold medal – first place	1982 Leicester	Sprint (amateur)
Gold medal – first place	1983 Zurich	1 km time trial
Silver medal – second place	1983 Zurich	Sprint (amateur)
Bronze medal – third place	1981 Brno	1 km time trial

Sergei Vladimirovich Kopylov (Russian: Серге́й Владимирович Копылов; born 29 July 1960 in Tula) is a racing cyclist from the Soviet Union.

He competed for the Soviet Union in the 1980 Summer Olympics held in Moscow, Soviet Union in the individual sprint event, where he finished in third place. In 1981, he won the world amateur sprint championship gold medal. In 1982, he successfully defended his title against his main rival of the time, East Germany's Lutz Heßlich. In 1983, he focused on the 1 km time trial, capturing the world championship in Switzerland. The Soviet boycott of the 1984 Los Angeles Olympics prevented him from competing for an Olympic gold medal.

Records
Preceded by Sergei Zouravlev	Men's 200 meter Time Trial world record holder 02 August 1981 – 08 July 1986	Succeeded by Michael Hübner
