= Cycling at the 1980 Summer Olympics – Men's individual pursuit =

Cycling - Men's individual pursuit at the Games of the XXII Olympiad
- Venue: Moscow Olympic Velodrome
- Dates: 22–24 July
- Competitors: 14 from 14 nations

Medalists
1st place, gold medalist(s)		Robert Dill-Bundi	Switzerland
2nd place, silver medalist(s)		Alain Bondue	France
3rd place, bronze medalist(s)		Hans-Henrik Ørsted	Denmark

These are the official results of the Men's Individual Pursuit at the 1980 Summer Olympics in Moscow, Russian SFSR, Soviet Union, held from 22 to 24 July 1980. There were a total number of 14 participants in the Olympic Velodrome.

== Results ==
=== Qualification ===
Rank	Cyclist	Time	Note
1	Harald Wolf (GDR)	4:39,96	
2	Hans-Henrik Ørsted (DEN)	4:39,98	
3	Alain Bondue (FRA)	4:40,08	
4	Robert Dill-Bundi (SUI)	4:40,71	
5	Vladimir Osokin (URS)	4:41,51	
6	Pierangelo Bincoletto (ITA)	4:43,65	
7	Sean Yates (GBR)	4:44,69	
8	Martin Penc (TCH)	4:48,15	
9	Kelvin Poole (AUS)	4:49,71	
10	Joseph Smeets (BEL)	4:49,48	
11	Sixten Wackström (FIN)	4:50,17	
12	Zbigniew Woźnicki (POL)	4:53,53	
13	Antônio Silvestre (BRA)	4:54,52	
14	Jhon Jarrín (ECU)	5:14,64	

=== Quarter finals ===
Heat	Rank	Cyclist	Nation	Time	Note
1	1	Robert Dill-Bundi	Switzerland	4:34,92	Q
1	2	Vladimir Osokin	Soviet Union	4:38,17	
2	1	Alain Bondue	France	4:36,27	Q
2	2	Pierangelo Bincoletto	Italy	4:43,84	
3	1	Hans-Henrik Ørsted	Denmark	4:38,42	Q
3	2	Sean Yates	Great Britain	4:41,39	
4	1	Harald Wolf	East Germany	4:37,18	Q
4	2	Martin Penc	Czechoslovakia	4:47,87	

=== Semi finals ===
Heat	Rank	Cyclist	Nation	Time	Note
1	1	Alain Bondue	France	4:36,23	Q
1	2	Harald Wolf	East Germany	4:40,10	
2	1	Robert Dill-Bundi	Switzerland	4:32,29	Q
2	2	Hans-Henrik Ørsted	Denmark	4:36,85	

=== Finals ===
Heat	Rank	Cyclist	Nation	Time	Rank
Bronze medal match	1	Hans-Henrik Ørsted	Denmark	4:36,54	3rd place, bronze medalist(s)
Bronze medal match	2	Harald Wolf	East Germany	4:37,38	4
Gold medal match	1	Robert Dill-Bundi	Switzerland	4:35,66	1st place, gold medalist(s)
Gold medal match	2	Alain Bondue	France	4:42,96	2nd place, silver medalist(s)
