= László Morcz =

Hungarian cyclist

Personal information
- Born: 4 April 1956 (age 70) Budapest, Hungary

Cycling career
- Sport: Cycling

László Morcz (born 4 April 1956) is a Hungarian former cyclist. He competed in the sprint event at the 1980 Summer Olympics.
