= 1982 Giro d'Italia =

Race details
- Dates: 13 May – 6 June 1982
- Stages: 22 + Prologue
- Distance: 4,010.5 km (2,492 mi)
- Winning time: 110h 07' 55"

Results
Jersey awarded to the overall winner	Winner	Bernard Hinault (FRA)	(Renault–Elf)
	Second	Tommy Prim (SWE)	(Bianchi)
	Third	Silvano Contini (ITA)	(Bianchi)
Jersey awarded to the points classification winner	Points	Francesco Moser (ITA)	(Famcucine)
Jersey awarded to the mountains classification winner	Mountains	Lucien Van Impe (BEL)	(Metauro Mobili)
Jersey awarded to the youth classification winner	Youth	Marco Groppo (ITA)	(Metauro Mobili)
	Team	Bianchi	
	Team points	Bianchi	

The 1982 Giro d'Italia was the 65th running of the Giro. It started in Brescia, on 13 May, with a 16 km (9.9 mi) team time trial and concluded in Turin, on 6 June, with a 42.5 km (26.4 mi) individual time trial. A total of 162 riders from eighteen teams entered the 22-stage race, that was won by Frenchman Bernard Hinault of the Renault–Elf team. The second and third places were taken by Swede Tommy Prim and Italian Silvano Contini, respectively.

Amongst the other classifications that the race awarded, Famcucine's Francesco Moser won the points classification, Lucien Van Impe of Metauro Mobili won the mountains classification, and Metauro Mobili's Marco Groppo completed the Giro as the best neo-professional in the general classification, finishing ninth overall. Bianchi finishing as the winners of the team classification, ranking each of the twenty teams contesting the race by lowest cumulative time. In addition, Bianchi won the team points classification.

== Teams ==
A total of eighteen teams were invited to participate in the 1982 Giro d'Italia. The starting riders came from a total of 15 different countries; Italy (99) and Spain (17) were the only countries with more than 10 riders represented. Each team sent a squad of nine riders, which meant that the race started with a peloton of 162 cyclists.

Of those starting, 70 were riding the Giro d'Italia for the first time. The average age of riders was 25.46 years, ranging from 19–year–old Giorgio Aiardi (Inoxpran) to 36–year–old Wladimiro Panizza (Del Tongo). The team with the youngest average rider age was Alfa Lum (23), while the oldest was Del Tongo (28). From the riders that began this edition, 110 made it to the finish in Turin.

The teams entering the race were:

- Inoxpran
- Alfa Lum
- Atala–Campagnolo
- Bianchi
- Ovest Campagnolo
- Del Tongo
- Famcucine–Campagnolo
- Zor
- Gis Gelati
- Hoonved–Bottecchia
- Kelme
- Metauro Mobili
- Renault–Elf
- Royal–Wrangler
- Sammontana
- Selle Italia–Chinol
- Selle San Marco–Wilier Triestina
- Termolan–Galli

== Route and stages ==
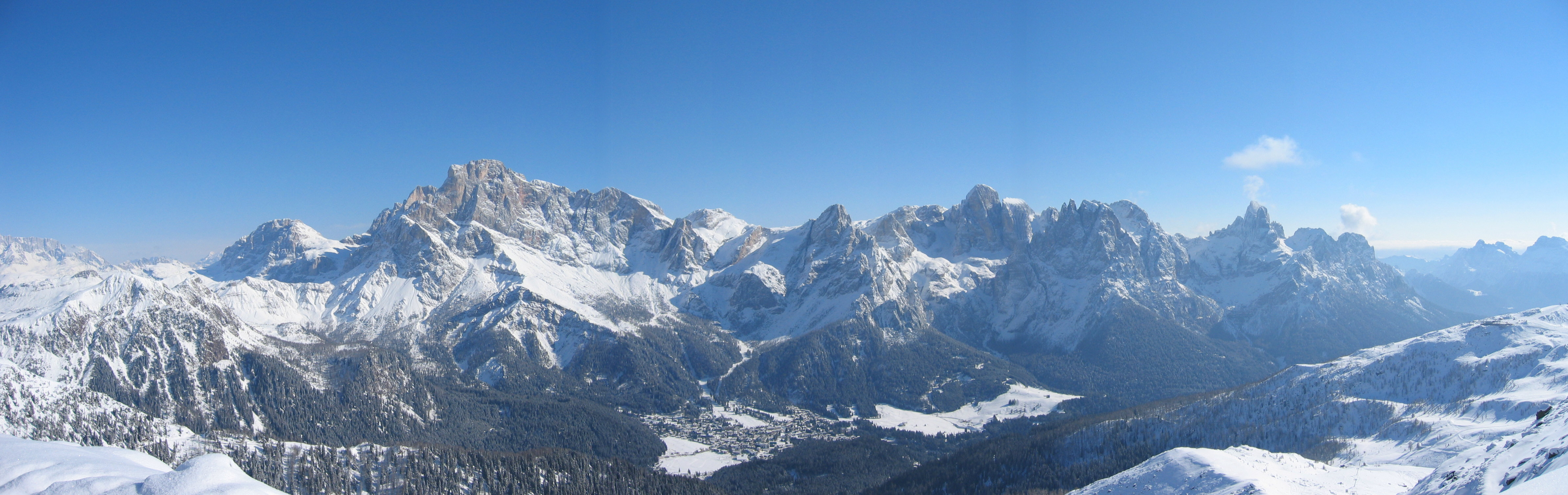
San Martino di Castrozza hosted the end of the 243 km (151 mi) sixteenth stage.

The route for the 1982 edition of the Giro d'Italia was revealed to the public by head organizer Vincenzo Torriani on 20 February 1982. Covering a total of 4,010.5 km (2,492.0 mi), it included three time trials (two individual and one for teams), and eleven stages with categorized climbs that awarded mountains classification points. Four of these eleven stages had summit finishes: stage 11, to Camigliatello Silano; stage 12, to Campitello Matese; stage 16, to San Martino di Castrozza; and stage 19, to Colli di San Fermo. The organizers chose to include two rest days. When compared to the previous year's race, the race was 114.9 km (71 mi) longer and contained one less time trial. In addition, this race contained one less set of split stages.

Stage characteristics and winners
Stage	Date	Course	Distance	Type	Winner
P	13 May	Milan	16 km (10 mi)	Team time trial	Renault–Elf (Note: The race leader's maglia rosa (English: pink jersey) was awarded to the winning team's first rider to cross the finish line.)
1	14 May	Parma to Viareggio	174 km (108 mi)	Stage with mountain(s)	Giuseppe Saronni (ITA)
2	15 May	Viareggio to Cortona	233 km (145 mi)	Plain stage	Michael Wilson (AUS)
3	16 May	Perugia to Assisi	37 km (23 mi)	Individual time trial	Bernard Hinault (FRA)
4	17 May	Assisi to Rome	169 km (105 mi)	Plain stage	Urs Freuler (SUI)
5	18 May	Rome to Caserta	213 km (132 mi)	Plain stage	Urs Freuler (SUI)
6	19 May	Caserta to Castellammare di Stabia	130 km (81 mi)	Stage with mountain(s)	Silvano Contini (ITA)
7	20 May	Castellammare di Stabia to Diamante	226 km (140 mi)	Plain stage	Francesco Moser (ITA)
	21 May	Rest day			
8	22 May	Taormina to Agrigento	248 km (154 mi)	Stage with mountain(s)	Moreno Argentin (ITA)
9	23 May	Agrigento to Palermo	151 km (94 mi)	Stage with mountain(s)	Giuseppe Saronni (ITA)
10	24 May	Cefalù to Messina	197 km (122 mi)	Plain stage	Urs Freuler (SUI)
11	25 May	Palmi to Camigliatello Silano	229 km (142 mi)	Stage with mountain(s)	Bernard Becaas (FRA)
	26 May	Rest day			
12	27 May	Cava de' Tirreni to Campitello Matese	171 km (106 mi)	Stage with mountain(s)	Bernard Hinault (FRA)
13	28 May	Campitello Matese to Pescara	164 km (102 mi)	Stage with mountain(s)	Silvano Contini (ITA)
14	29 May	Pescara to Urbino	248 km (154 mi)	Plain stage	Guido Bontempi (ITA)
15	30 May	Urbino to Comacchio	190 km (118 mi)	Plain stage	Silvestro Milani (ITA)
16	31 May	Comacchio to San Martino di Castrozza	243 km (151 mi)	Stage with mountain(s)	Vicente Belda (ESP)
17	1 June	Fiera di Primiero to Boario Terme	235 km (146 mi)	Stage with mountain(s)	Silvano Contini (ITA)
18	2 June	Piancogno to Montecampione	85 km (53 mi)	Stage with mountain(s)	Bernard Hinault (FRA)
19	3 June	Boario Terme to Vigevano	162 km (101 mi)	Plain stage	Robert Dill-Bundi (SUI)
20	4 June	Vigevano to Cuneo	177 km (110 mi)	Plain stage	Francesco Moser (ITA)
21	5 June	Cuneo to Pinerolo	254 km (158 mi)	Stage with mountain(s)	Giuseppe Saronni (ITA)
22	6 June	Pinerolo to Turin	42.5 km (26 mi)	Individual time trial	Bernard Hinault (FRA)
	Total		4,010.5 km (2,492 mi)		

== Classification leadership ==
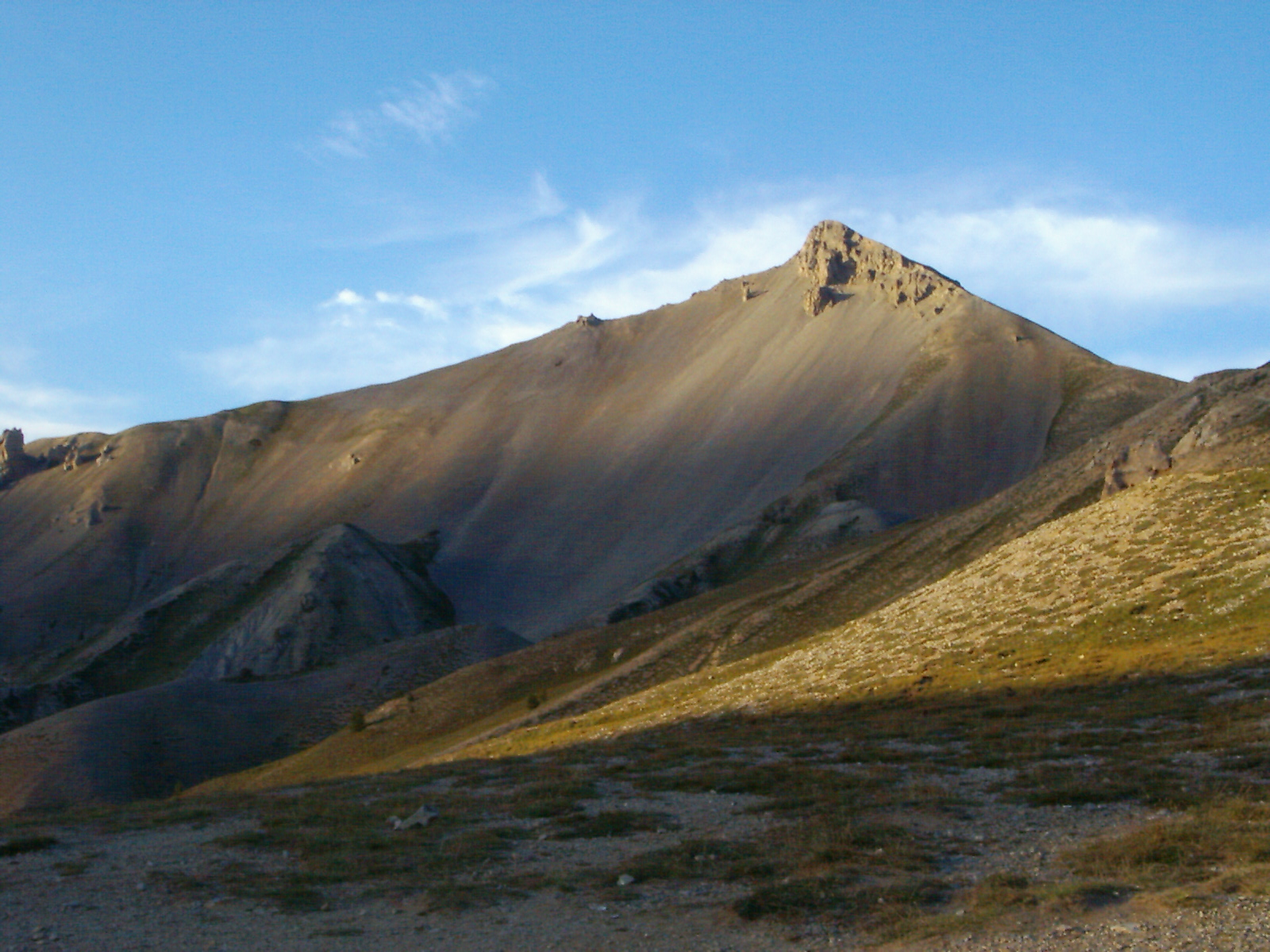
The Col d'Izoard was the Cima Coppi for the 1982 running of the Giro d'Italia.

Four different jerseys were worn during the 1982 Giro d'Italia. The leader of the general classification – calculated by adding the stage finish times of each rider, and allowing time bonuses for the first three finishers on mass-start stages – wore a pink jersey. This classification is the most important of the race, and its winner is considered as the winner of the Giro.

For the points classification, which awarded a purple (or cyclamen) jersey to its leader, cyclists were given points for finishing a stage in the top 15.

The green jersey was awarded to the mountains classification leader. In this ranking, points were won by reaching the summit of a climb ahead of other cyclists. Each climb was ranked as either first, second or third category, with more points available for higher category climbs. The Cima Coppi, the race's highest point of elevation, awarded more points than the other first category climbs. The Cima Coppi for this Giro was the Col d'Izoard. The first rider to cross the Col d'Izoard was Belgian rider Lucien Van Impe.

The white jersey was worn by the leader of young rider classification, a ranking decided the same way as the general classification, but considering only neo-professional cyclists (in their first three years of professional racing).

A minor classification was the FIAT classification, where points were earned at intermediate sprints.

Although no jersey was awarded, there was also one classification for the teams, in which the stage finish times of the best three cyclists per team were added; the leading team was the one with the lowest total time. There was another team classification that awarded points to each team based on their riding's finishing position in every stage. The team with the highest total of points was the leader of the classification.

The rows in the following table correspond to the jerseys awarded after that stage was run.

Classification leadership by stage
Stage	Winner	General classification	Points classification	Mountains classification	Young rider classification	FIAT	Team classification
P	Renault–Elf	Bernard Hinault	not awarded	not awarded	Marc Madiot	not awarded	Renault–Elf
1	Giuseppe Saronni	Patrick Bonnet	Giuseppe Saronni	Faustino Rupérez Rincón	Marc Madiot	Palmiro Masciarelli	Renault–Elf
2	Michael Wilson	Laurent Fignon	Giuseppe Saronni	Faustino Rupérez Rincón	Laurent Fignon	multiple riders	Renault–Elf
3	Bernard Hinault	Bernard Hinault	Giuseppe Saronni	Faustino Rupérez Rincón	Michael Wilson	multiple riders	Bianchi
4	Urs Freuler	Bernard Hinault	Giuseppe Saronni	Faustino Rupérez Rincón	Michael Wilson	multiple riders	Bianchi
5	Urs Freuler	Bernard Hinault	Urs Freuler	Faustino Rupérez Rincón	Michael Wilson	?	Bianchi
6	Silvano Contini	Bernard Hinault	Giuseppe Saronni	Lucien Van Impe	Fabrizio Verza	Palmiro Masciarelli	Bianchi
7	Francesco Moser	Francesco Moser	Francesco Moser	Lucien Van Impe	Fabrizio Verza	Palmiro Masciarelli	Bianchi
8	Moreno Argentin	Francesco Moser	Francesco Moser	Lucien Van Impe	Fabrizio Verza	Palmiro Masciarelli	Bianchi
9	Giuseppe Saronni	Francesco Moser	Giuseppe Saronni	Lucien Van Impe	Fabrizio Verza	Palmiro Masciarelli	Bianchi
10	Urs Freuler	Francesco Moser	Francesco Moser	Lucien Van Impe	Fabrizio Verza	Palmiro Masciarelli	Bianchi
11	Bernard Becaas	Francesco Moser	Francesco Moser	Lucien Van Impe	Fabrizio Verza	Palmiro Masciarelli	Bianchi
12	Bernard Hinault	Bernard Hinault	Francesco Moser	Lucien Van Impe	Fabrizio Verza	Palmiro Masciarelli	Bianchi
13	Silvano Contini	Bernard Hinault	Francesco Moser	Lucien Van Impe	Fabrizio Verza	Palmiro Masciarelli	Bianchi
14	Guido Bontempi	Bernard Hinault	Francesco Moser	Lucien Van Impe	Fabrizio Verza	Palmiro Masciarelli	Bianchi
15	Silvestro Milani	Bernard Hinault	Francesco Moser	Lucien Van Impe	Fabrizio Verza	Palmiro Masciarelli	Bianchi
16	Vicente Belda	Bernard Hinault	Francesco Moser	Lucien Van Impe	Fabrizio Verza	Palmiro Masciarelli	Bianchi
17	Silvano Contini	Silvano Contini	Francesco Moser	Lucien Van Impe	Marco Groppo	Palmiro Masciarelli	Bianchi
18	Bernard Hinault	Bernard Hinault	Francesco Moser	Lucien Van Impe	Marco Groppo	Palmiro Masciarelli	Bianchi
19	Robert Dill-Bundi	Bernard Hinault	Francesco Moser	Lucien Van Impe	Marco Groppo	Palmiro Masciarelli	Bianchi
20	Francesco Moser	Bernard Hinault	Francesco Moser	Lucien Van Impe	Marco Groppo	Palmiro Masciarelli	Bianchi
21	Giuseppe Saronni	Bernard Hinault	Francesco Moser	Lucien Van Impe	Marco Groppo	Palmiro Masciarelli	Bianchi
22	Bernard Hinault	Bernard Hinault	Francesco Moser	Lucien Van Impe	Marco Groppo	Palmiro Masciarelli	Bianchi
Final		Bernard Hinault	Francesco Moser	Lucien Van Impe	Marco Groppo	Palmiro Masciarelli	Bianchi

== Final standings ==
Legend
Pink jersey	Denotes the winner of the General classification
Green jersey	Denotes the winner of the Mountains classification
Purple jersey	Denotes the winner of the Points classification
White jersey	Denotes the winner of the Young rider classification

=== General classification ===
Final general classification (1–10)
Rank	Name	Team	Time
1	Bernard Hinault (FRA)	Renault–Elf	110h 07' 55"
2	Tommy Prim (SWE)	Bianchi	+ 2' 35"
3	Silvano Contini (ITA)	Bianchi	+ 2' 47"
4	Lucien Van Impe (BEL)	Metauro Mobili	+ 4' 31"
5	Gianbattista Baronchelli (ITA)	Bianchi	+ 6' 09"
6	Giuseppe Saronni (ITA)	Del Tongo	+ 10' 52"
7	Mario Beccia (ITA)	Hoonved–Bottecchia	+ 11' 06"
8	Francesco Moser (ITA)	Famcucine	+ 11' 57"
9	Marco Groppo (ITA)	Metauro Mobili	+ 14' 43"
10	Faustino Rupérez Rincón (ESP)	Zor	+ 14' 57"

=== Points classification ===
Final points classification (1–10)
	Rider	Team	Points
1	Francesco Moser (ITA)	Famcucine	247
2	Giuseppe Saronni (ITA)	Del Tongo	207
3	Bernard Hinault (FRA)	Renault–Elf	171
4	Silvano Contini (ITA)	Bianchi	153
5	Tommy Prim (SWE)	Bianchi	126
6	Urs Freuler (SUI)	Atala–Campagnolo	115
7	Lucien Van Impe (BEL)	Metauro Mobili	96
8	Mario Beccia (ITA)	Hoonved–Bottecchia	94
9	Gianbattista Baronchelli (ITA)	Bianchi	80
10	Noël Dejonckeere (BEL)	Gis Gelati	78

=== Mountains classification ===
Final mountains classification (1–9)
	Rider	Team	Points
1	Lucien Van Impe (BEL)	Metauro Mobili	860
2	Bernard Hinault (FRA)	Renault–Elf	380
3	Silvano Contini (ITA)	Bianchi	290
4	Gianbattista Baronchelli (ITA)	Bianchi	260
5	Faustino Rupérez Rincón (ESP)	Zor	200
6	Mario Beccia (ITA)	Hoonved–Bottecchia	165
7	Urs Freuler (SUI)	Atala–Campagnolo	150
8	Fabrizio Verza (ITA)	Gis Gelati	125
9	Davide Cassani (ITA)	Termolan–Galli	120
9	Bert Pronk (NED)	Bibione-Stern TV	120

=== Young rider classification ===
Final young rider classification (1–10)
	Rider	Team	Time
1	Marco Groppo (ITA)	Metauro Mobili	110h 22' 38"
2	Laurent Fignon (FRA)	Renault–Elf	+ 26' 16"
3	Czesław Lang (POL)	Gis Gelati	+ 28' 20"
4	Fabrizio Verza (ITA)	Gis Gelati	+ 31' 52"
5	Giovanni Testolin (ITA)	Selle San Marco–Wilier Triestina	+ 49' 14"
6	Franco Chioccioli (ITA)	Selle Italia–Chinol	+ 56' 56"
7	Erminio Rizzi (ITA)	Zor	+ 1h 02' 17"
8	Álvaro Pino (ESP)	Gis Gelati	+ 1h 09' 06"
9	Giuseppe Lanzoni (ITA)	Atala–Campagnolo	+ 1h 17' 19"
10	Marc Madiot (FRA)	Renault–Elf	+ 1h 17' 45"

=== Traguardi Fiat classification ===
Final traguardi fiat classification (1–10)
	Rider	Team	Points
1	Palmiro Masciarelli (ITA)	Metauro Mobili	45
2	Giovanni Renosto (ITA)	Renault–Elf	36
3	Francesco Moser (ITA)	Famcucine	18
4	Gianbattista Baronchelli (ITA)	Bianchi	12
5	Moreno Argentin (ITA)	Sammontana	8
5	Silvano Contini (ITA)	Bianchi	8
7	Walter Delle Case (ITA)	Atala–Campagnolo	7
7	Leonardo Natale (ITA)	Del Tongo	7
9	Eduardo Chozas (ESP)	Zor	6
10	Marino Amadori (ITA)	Famcucine	5

=== Team classification ===
Final team classification (1–10)
	Team	Time
1	Bianchi	330h 35' 38"
2	Del Tongo	+ 49' 43"
3	Famcucine	+ 1h 30' 03"
4	Renault–Elf	+ 1h 32' 03"
5	Gis Gelati	+ 1h 35' 53"
6	Zor	+ 1h 49' 54"
7	Metauro Mobili	+ 2h 10' 06"
8	Selle San Marco–Wilier Triestina	+ 2h 25' 30"
9	Inoxpran	+ 2h 56' 47"
10	Hoonved–Bottecchia	+ 3h 00' 42"

=== Team points classification ===
Final team points classification (1–10)
	Team	Points
1	Bianchi	381
2	Famcucine	316
3	Del Tongo	238
4	Hoonved–Bottecchia	221
5	Metauro Mobili	218
6	Atala–Campagnolo	217
7	Gis Gelati	169
8	Selle San Marco–Wilier Triestina	141
9	Inoxpran	107
10	Termolan–Galli	98
