= Koichi Nakano =

Japanese cyclist

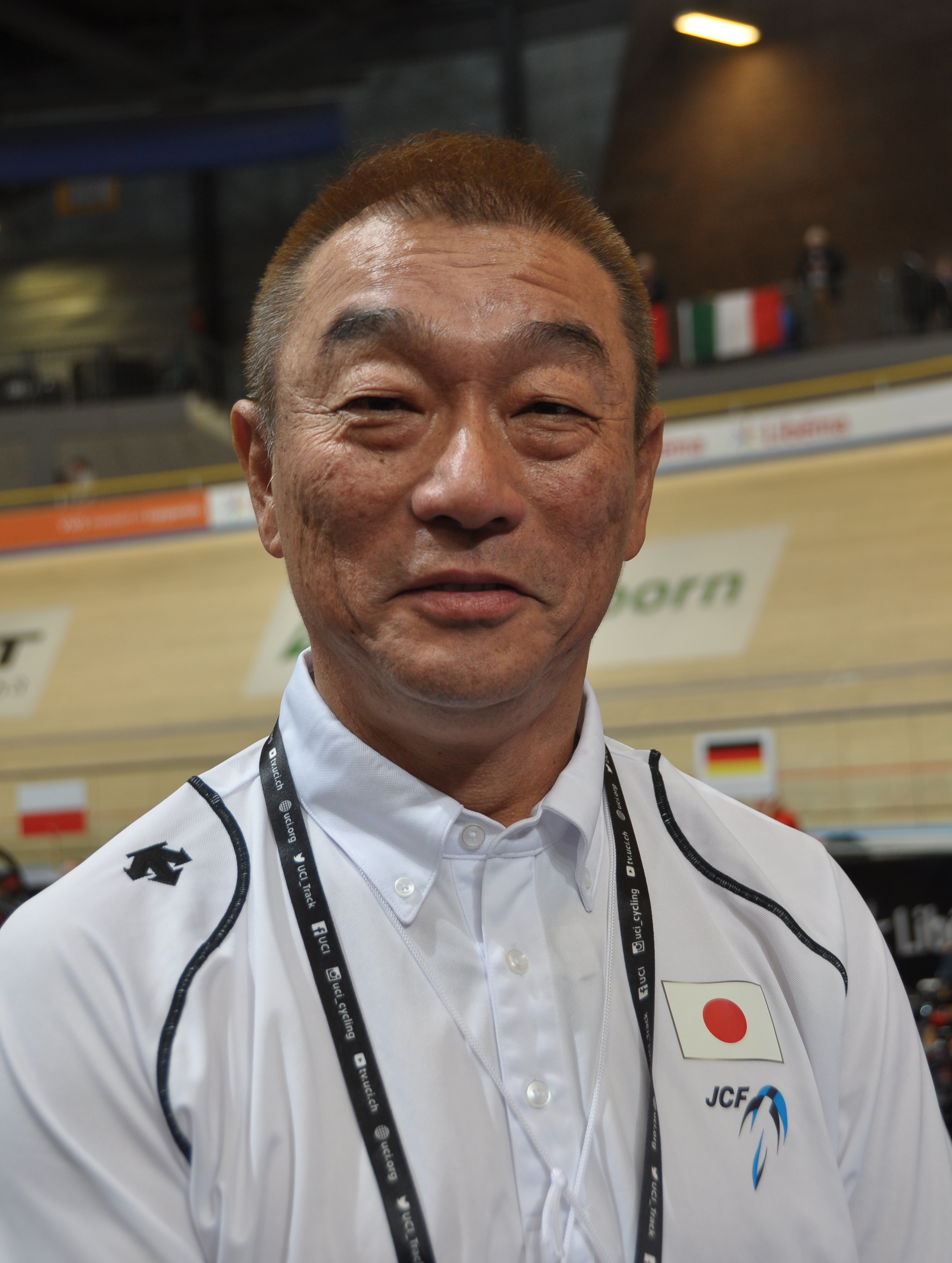
- Nakano in 2018

Personal information
- Full name: Koichi Nakano
- Born: November 14, 1955 (age 70) Kurume, Fukuoka, Japan

Cycling career
- Sport: Cycling
- Discipline: Track
- Role: Rider
- Rider type: Sprinter
Medal record
Men's track cycling
Representing Japan
UCI Track World Championships
Gold medal – first place	1977 San Cristóbal	Sprint
Gold medal – first place	1978 Munich	Sprint
Gold medal – first place	1979 Amsterdam	Sprint
Gold medal – first place	1980 Besançon	Sprint
Gold medal – first place	1981 Brno	Sprint
Gold medal – first place	1982 Leicester	Sprint
Gold medal – first place	1983 Zürich	Sprint
Gold medal – first place	1984 Barcelona	Sprint
Gold medal – first place	1985 Bassano del Grappa	Sprint
Gold medal – first place	1986 Colorado Springs	Sprint

Koichi Nakano (中野 浩一, Nakano Kōichi) (born November 14, 1955) of Japan is a former professional track cyclist and ten-consecutive-time world champion in track cycling sprint.

He is among the best track sprinters of modern times. From 1977 to 1986, he won an unprecedented 10 consecutive gold medals in professional sprint events at the UCI Track World Championships.

He was one of the most successful competitors of all-time on the Japanese professional keirin circuit.

== Video game ==
Nakano Kōichi Kanshū: Keirin Ō

Nakano Kōichi Kanshū: Keirin Ō
- Developer: C-Lab
- Publisher: Coconuts Japan
- Platform: Super Famicom
- Release: JP: November 18, 1994
- Genre: Sports
- Mode: Single-player

King Keirin ( 競輪王 ) is a track cycling racing simulation game endorsed by Koichi Nakano, originally created by Coconuts Japan Entertainment (ココナッツジャパンエンターテイメント), and released for the Super Famicom in 1994.

Nakano Kōichi Kanshū: Keirin Ō (中野浩一監修 競輪王) is a cycling video game that allows the player to control the daily life of a professional cycling athlete.

As the title says, it was supervised by Kōichi Nakano.

=== Gameplay ===
The player must make daily life decisions while training for the next event. The game starts on April 1, 1994, with a 20-year-old rider. However, he will advance in years as the player progresses in his career and partakes in the events of the cycling season. Players can earn up to 1,000,000,000 yen ($11,068,367.11 in American dollars) and give their rider a name in either hiragana or katakana.

In the actual competition, the player must watch himself try to beat eight other cyclists for the race win. Nine cyclists race against each other in a velodrome and they compete for money and a championship. It is unknown whether the game makes the player retire at 45 years of age like in most modern titles or not. Riders are not always traveling at full speed or at a specific radius; making a balance between aggressive riding and passive riding a must.

== See also ==
- UCI Track Cycling World Championships – Men's sprint
