= Heinz Betz =

German bicycle racer

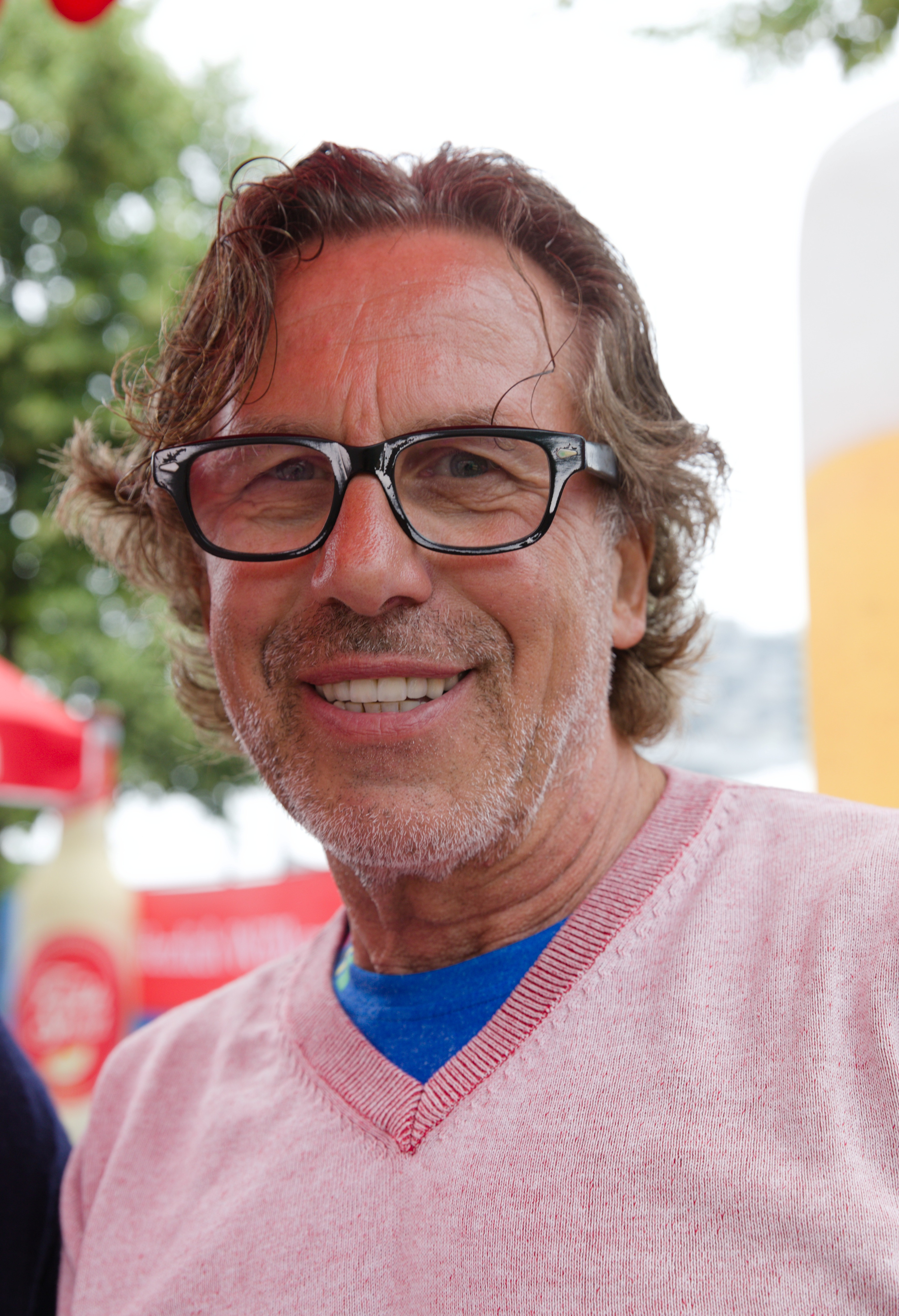
- Betz in 2018

Personal information
- Born: 29 September 1954 (age 72) Bad Cannstatt, Stuttgart, Germany

Cycling career
- Sport: Cycling
- Current team: Retired
- Disciplines: Road; Track
- Role: Rider

Professional teams
- 1977–1979: Sigloch
- 1978: Willora–Piz Buin–Mairag
- 1979–1981: Kondor
- 1984–1986: Maredo-Centurion
Medal record
Representing Germany
Men's track cycling
World Championships
Bronze medal – third place	1980 Besançon	Points race

Heinz Betz (born 29 September 1954) is a German former professional racing cyclist. He most notably won the bronze medal in the points race at the 1980 UCI Track Cycling World Championships. He also competed on the road, notably riding in the 1980 Giro d'Italia.

His brother Werner was also a professional cyclist.
