= Connie Paraskevin =

American cyclist and speed skater

Personal information
- Full name: Constance Anne Paraskevin
- Born: July 4, 1961 (age 65) Detroit, Michigan, U.S.
- Height: 1.60 m (5 ft 3 in)
- Weight: 55 kg (121 lb)

Cycling career
- Sport: Cycling
- Discipline: Track
- Role: Rider
Medal record
Representing the United States
Women's track cycling
Olympic Games
Bronze medal – third place	1988 Seoul	Sprint
World Championships
Gold medal – first place	1982 Leicester	Sprint
Gold medal – first place	1983 Zurich	Sprint
Gold medal – first place	1984 Bassano del Grappa	Sprint
Gold medal – first place	1990 Maebashi	Sprint
Silver medal – second place	1985 Bassano del Grappa	Sprint
Bronze medal – third place	1986 Colorado Springs	Sprint
Bronze medal – third place	1987 Vienna	Sprint
Bronze medal – third place	1991 Stuttgart	Sprint
Women's Speed skating
World Championships
Bronze medal – third place	1978	?
Bronze medal – third place	1978	?

Constance Anne Paraskevin, known as Connie (married name Paraskevin-Young; born July 4, 1961) is a retired American professional track cyclist and speed skater. She is a four times sprint world champion, ten times national sprint champion and an Olympic bronze medalist.

Paraskevin began skating at the age of ten, she finished third at two 500m competitions at the world sprint speed skating championships in 1978 but did not medal. At the age of 19, she was a member of the US team at the 1980 Winter Olympics although she did not compete. Four years later she competed at the 1984 Winter Olympics.

Paraskevin campaigned to have the women's sprint event included in the 1988 Summer Olympics before going on to win a bronze medal in the event in Seoul. She went on to compete at a further two Summer Olympics before retiring at the end of 1996.

Born in Detroit, Michigan, she is the former wife of the Olympic cyclist Roger Young. Paraskevin also coached the speed skater Bonnie Blair when she briefly dabbled in track cycling. She is now the founder/director of the Connie Cycling Foundation.

== Palmarès ==
1975
1st Intermediate Girls, US National Track Championships

1976
1st Intermediate Girls, US National Track Championships

1977
1st Junior Women, US National Track Championships

1978
1st Junior Women, US National Track Championships

1979
2nd Junior Women, US National Track Championships

1981
1st (United States) US National Criterium Championships
2nd Sprint, US National Track Championships

1982
1st Sprint, UCI Track Cycling World Championships
1st (United States) Sprint, US National Track Championships

1983
1st Sprint, UCI Track Cycling World Championships
1st (United States) Sprint, US National Track Championships

1984
1st Sprint, UCI Track Cycling World Championships
2nd GP d'Osaka, Japan

1985
1st (United States) Sprint, US National Track Championships - World Record 200 m - 11.393
2nd Sprint, UCI Track Cycling World Championships

1986
3rd Sprint, UCI Track Cycling World Championships

1987
1st (United States) Sprint, US National Track Championships
1st Sprint, Pan American Games
3rd Sprint, UCI Track Cycling World Championships

1988
1st (United States) Sprint, US National Track Championships
3rd Sprint, Olympic Games

1989
1st (United States) Sprint, US National Track Championships
1st Sprint, Sundance Grand Prix, USA
3rd Sprint, World Invitational, USA

1990
1st Sprint, UCI Track Cycling World Championships
1st Sprint, ABC Olympic Cup, USA
1st Sprint, Goodwill Games, USA
Velo News Oscars - U.S. Female Cyclist of the year.

1991
1st Sprint, Pre Olympic Track event, Spain
3rd Sprint, UCI Track Cycling World Championships
3rd Sprint, G.P. De Paris, France

1992
1st (United States) Sprint, US National Track Championships

1993
3rd UCI Track Cycling World Cup Classics, Copenhagen
3rd Sprint, US National Track Championships

1994
1st Sprint, US National Track Championships

1995
1st (United States) Sprint, US National Track Championships
2nd Sprint, Pan American Games, Argentina

1996
1st (United States) Sprint, US National Track Championships
