= 1980 World Juniors Track Cycling Championships =

- Venue: Mexico City, Mexico
- Date: August 1980

The 1980 World Juniors Track Cycling Championships were the sixth annual Junior World Championships for track cycling held in Mexico City, Mexico in August 1980. It was the third successive championship to be held in the Americas.

The Championships had five events for men only, Sprint, Points race, Individual pursuit, Team pursuit and 1 kilometre time trial. Maic Malchow of East Germany and Dainis Liepiņš of the Soviet Union were the most successful cyclists, winning the sprint double and pursuit double respectively.

== Events ==
Event	Gold	Silver	Bronze
Men's events
Sprint	Maic Malchow; East Germany	Olaf Arndt; East Germany	El Guilachvli; Soviet Union
Points race	Uwe Messerschmidt; West Germany	Mat Lange; West Germany	José Youshimatz; Mexico
Pursuit	Dainis Liepiņš; Soviet Union	Mario Kummer; East Germany	Uwe Tromer; East Germany
Team pursuit	Andris Lotsmelis; Dainis Liepiņš; Martin Palis; Sergei Agupov; Soviet Union	Mario Kummer; Frank Kuhn; Uwe Tromer; Gerald Buder; East Germany	Pierce Hewitt; Gary Sadler; Darryl Webster; Anthony Mayer; United Kingdom
Time trial	Maic Malchow; East Germany	Andris Lotsmelis; Soviet Union	Rob Werner; West Germany

== Medal table ==
* Host nation (Mexico)

Rank	Nation	Gold	Silver	Bronze	Total
1	East Germany (GDR)	2	3	1	6
2	Soviet Union (URS)	2	1	1	4
3	West Germany (FRG)	1	1	1	3
4	Great Britain (GBR)	0	0	1	1
4	Mexico (MEX)*	0	0	1	1
Totals (5 entries)		5	5	5	15
