= Harald Wolf =

East German cyclist

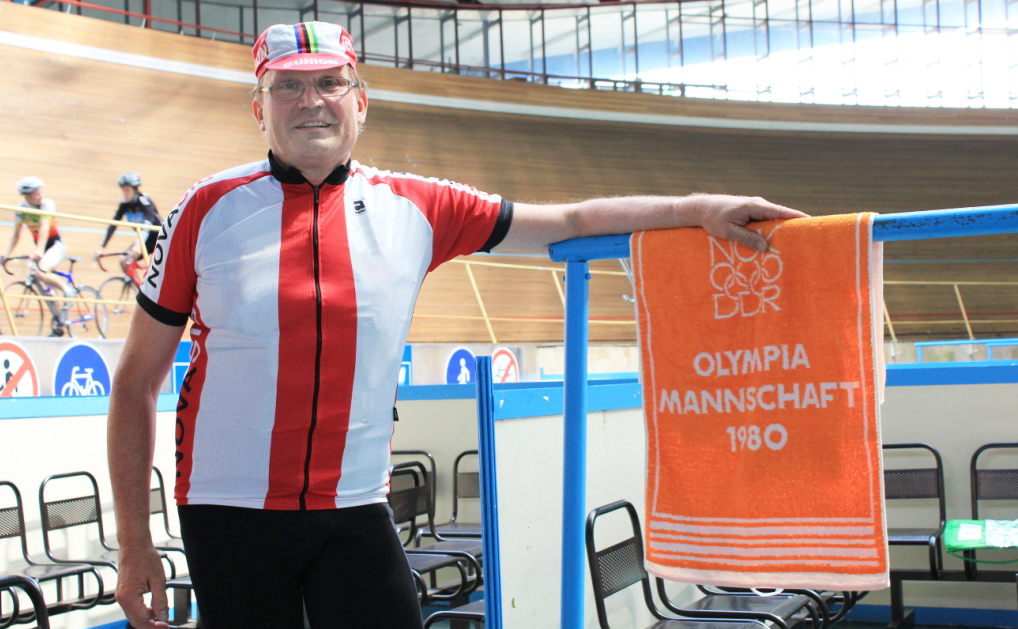
- Harald Wolf in 2013

Personal information
- Born: 7 November 1955 (age 70) Chemnitz, East Germany

Cycling career
- Sport: Cycling

Harald Wolf (7 November 1955) is a German former cyclist. He competed in the individual pursuit event at the 1980 Summer Olympics.
