= Rebecca Twigg =

American racing cyclist

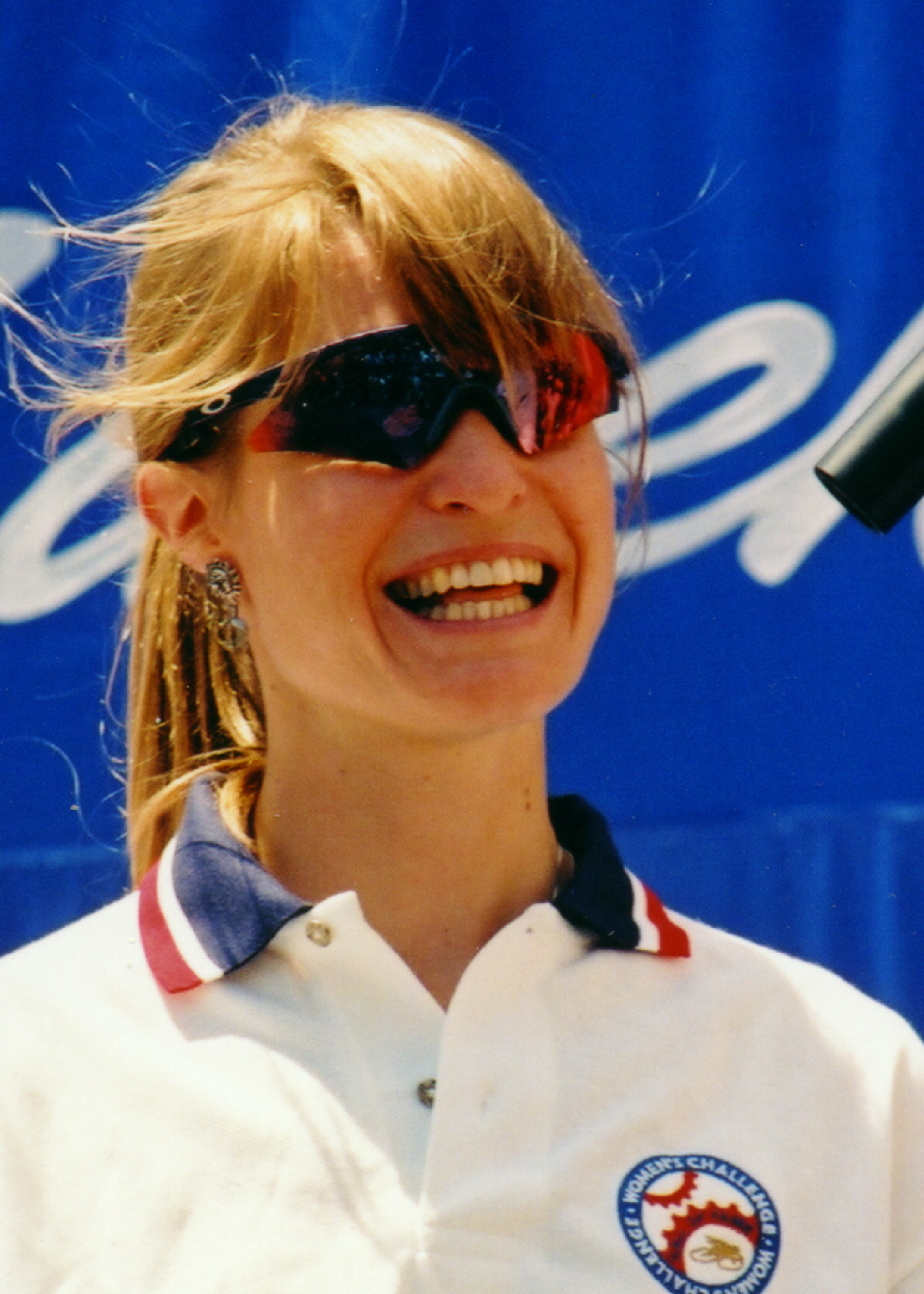
- Twigg at the 1999 Women's Challenge

Personal information
- Full name: Rebecca Lynne Twigg
- Born: March 26, 1963 (age 63) Seattle, Washington, U.S.
- Height: 5 ft 7 in (1.70 m)
- Weight: 126 lb (57 kg)

Cycling career
- Sport: Cycling
- Disciplines: Road and track
- Role: Rider
Medal record
Representing the United States
Women's Track racing
Olympic Games
Bronze medal – third place	1992 Barcelona	Individual pursuit
World Championship
Gold medal – first place	1982 Leicester	Individual pursuit
Gold medal – first place	1984 Barcelona	Individual pursuit
Gold medal – first place	1985 Bassano	Individual pursuit
Gold medal – first place	1987 Vienna	Individual pursuit
Gold medal – first place	1993 Hamar	Individual pursuit
Gold medal – first place	1995 Bogotá	Individual pursuit
Silver medal – second place	1986 Colorado Springs	Individual pursuit
Pan American Games
Gold medal – first place	1987 Indianapolis	Individual pursuit
Women's road cycling
Olympic Games
Silver medal – second place	1984 Los Angeles	Road race
World Championships
Silver medal – second place	1983 Altenrhein	Road race
Pan American Games
Gold medal – first place	1987 Indianapolis	Road race

Rebecca Lynne Twigg (born March 26, 1963) is an American former racing cyclist.

== Cycling career ==
An academic prodigy, she enrolled at the University of Washington in Seattle at the age of 14 and rode for the school's team. US national team coach Eddie Borysewicz saw her and invited her to join his team when she was 17. She earned degrees in biology and computer science from UW.

Twigg won six world track cycling championships in the individual pursuit. She also won 16 US championships (the first – the individual time trial – when she was 18) and two Olympic medals, the silver medal in the 1984 road race in Los Angeles, and a bronze medal in the pursuit in Barcelona in 1992.

She won the first three editions of the Women's Challenge on the road.

Twigg was a three-time Olympian (1984, 1992, and 1996). However, her final Olympic appearance, in Atlanta in 1996, ended in controversy when she quit the team in a disagreement with the coach Chris Carmichael and the U.S. Cycling Federation. The federation had invested in the development of the so-called SuperBike. Twigg, after using the bike earlier in the Games, refused to ride it, citing poor individual fit and claiming that pressure from the staff on her to use the SuperBike and their refusal to grant accreditation to her personal coach, Eddie Borysewicz, left her defocused.

Twigg married Mark Whitehead – a fellow member of the 1984 US Olympic cycling team – in 1985, but the marriage only lasted a couple of years.

== Post-cycling life ==
After retiring from competitive cycling, Twigg earned an associate degree in computer science and worked at various jobs in the information technology industry. She remarried and had a daughter with her second husband. She later quit her jobs and became homeless while staying in Seattle, and as of 2019 has been homeless for the past five years. Her first personal encounter with homelessness occurred when she was 15 years old and was kicked out of her house by her mother.

== Major results ==
1982
1st UCI Track Cycling World Championships (individual pursuit)
1st U.S. National Time Trial Championships
3rd United States National Road Race Championships
1983
3rd Coors Classic
1984
1st UCI Track Cycling World Championships (individual pursuit)
1st United States National Road Race Championships
1st Women's Challenge
1985
1st UCI Track Cycling World Championships (individual pursuit)
1st Women's Challenge
1986
2nd UCI Track Cycling World Championships (individual pursuit)
1st Women's Challenge
1987
1st UCI Track Cycling World Championships (individual pursuit)
1993
1st UCI Track Cycling World Championships (individual pursuit)
1st U.S. National Time Trial Championships
1994
1st U.S. National Time Trial Championships
6th UCI Road World Championships – Women's time trial
1995
1st UCI Track Cycling World Championships (individual pursuit)
1997
3rd U.S. National Time Trial Championships
