= Yavé Cahard =

French cyclist (born 1957)

Personal information
- Born: 26 December 1957 (age 68) Sainte-Adresse, France

Cycling career
- Sport: Cycling
Medal record
Men's cycling
Representing France
Olympic Games
Silver medal – second place	1980 Moscow	Sprint
UCI Track World Championships – Professional
Bronze medal – third place	1982 Leicester	Sprint
Silver medal – second place	1983 Zürich	Sprint
Bronze medal – third place	1984 Barcelona	Sprint

Yavé Cahard (born 26 December 1957) is a cyclist from France. He competed at the 1980 Summer Olympics held in Moscow, Soviet Union in the individual sprint event where he finished in second place. Cahard also won one silver and two bronze medals in the professional sprint events at the 1982, 1983, and 1984 UCI World Track Cycling Championships.
