= Lutz Heßlich =

East German cyclist (born 1959)

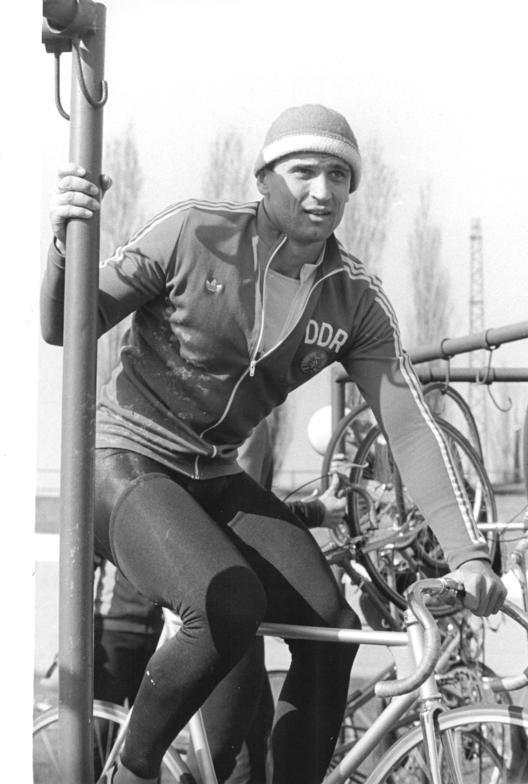
- Lutz Heßlich, 1988

Personal information
- Born: 17 January 1959 (age 67) Ortrand, Bezirk Cottbus, East Germany

Cycling career
- Sport: Cycling
Medal record
Men's cycling
Representing East Germany
Olympic Games
Gold medal – first place	1980 Moscow	Sprint
Gold medal – first place	1988 Seoul	Sprint
World Championships (Amateur)
Gold medal – first place	1979 Amsterdam	Sprint
Gold medal – first place	1983 Zurich	Sprint
Gold medal – first place	1985 Bassano del Grappa	Sprint
Gold medal – first place	1987 Vienna	Sprint
Silver medal – second place	1981 Brno	Sprint
Silver medal – second place	1982 Leicester	Sprint
Silver medal – second place	1986 Colorado Springs	Sprint
Bronze medal – third place	1977 San Cristóbal	Sprint

Lutz Heßlich (born 17 January 1959) is a former racing cyclist from East Germany.

He competed for East Germany in the 1980 Summer Olympics held in Moscow, Soviet Union in the individual sprint event where he finished in first place. He missed the 1984 Summer Olympics due to the Soviet led boycott but returned to the 1988 Summer Olympics in Seoul, South Korea where he won a second gold medal in the individual sprint. In October 1986, he was awarded a Star of People's Friendship in gold (second class) for his sporting success. Between 1979 and 1987 he was four times world champion in individual sprint.

== Private life ==
Lutz Heßlich lives with his family in Cottbus where since 1989 he has run a bicycle shop.

His great-grandfather, Walter Heßlich, was also a racing cyclist and his son Nico has embarked on a career as a competition racing cyclist in 2008.
