= Roberto Dotti =

Italian cyclist

Personal information
- Born: 25 July 1961 (age 64)

Sport
- Sport: Cycling
Medal record
Representing Italy
UCI Motor-paced World Championships
Silver medal – second place	1984 Barcelona	Amateurs
Gold medal – first place	1985 Bassano de Grappa	Amateurs

Roberto Dotti (born 25 July 1961) is a retired cyclist from Italy. He won the UCI Motor-paced World Championships in 1985 and finished in second place the year before.
