= Urs Freuler =

Swiss cyclist (born 1958)

Personal information
- Full name: Urs Freuler
- Born: 6 November 1958 (age 67) Bilten, Switzerland

Cycling career
- Sport: Cycling
- Current team: Retired
- Disciplines: Track and Road
- Role: Rider
- Rider type: Sprinter, Time Trial Specialist

Major wins
- Grand Tours Tour de France 1 individual stage (1981) Giro d'Italia Points Classification (1984) 15 individual stages (1982, 1984, 1985, 1986, 1987, 1988, 1989) World Champion Points race (1981 - 1987, 1989); World Champion Keirin (1983, 1985)
Medal record
Men's track cycling
Representing Switzerland
World Championships
Gold medal – first place	1981 Brno	Points race
Gold medal – first place	1982 Leicester	Points race
Gold medal – first place	1983 Zürich	Keirin
Gold medal – first place	1983 Zürich	Points race
Gold medal – first place	1984 Barcelona	Points race
Gold medal – first place	1985 Bassano del Grappa	Keirin
Gold medal – first place	1985 Bassano del Grappa	Points race
Gold medal – first place	1986 Colorado Springs	Points race
Gold medal – first place	1987 Vienna	Points race
Gold medal – first place	1989 Lyon	Points race
Bronze medal – third place	1984 Barcelona	Keirin
Bronze medal – third place	1986 Colorado Springs	Keirin
Bronze medal – third place	1987 Vienna	Keirin
Amateur World Championships
Bronze medal – third place	1978 Munich	Team pursuit
Bronze medal – third place	1979 Amsterdam	Points race

Urs Freuler (born 6 November 1958) is a Swiss cyclist, who raced professionally between 1980 and 1997, during which he won 124 victories. He was named Swiss Sports Personality of the Year in 1982 and 1983.

== Career ==
He was born in Bilten. As an amateur, he was the champion of his country in several categories and also achieved fame in international competitions.

He was a racer of great speed, who participated both in road races as well as track cycling. In the latter, he was the world champion in the keirin twice and the points race eight times and victor in 21 six-day races. On the road, he was victorious in numerous stages and criteriums. He competed in the team pursuit event at the 1980 Summer Olympics.

In 1981, Freuler was riding for a personal sponsor, when the TI–Raleighcycling team had problems to form a team for the 1981 Tour de France. The rules allowed for the Raleigh team to hire cyclists who were not riding for a cycling team, and Freuler was added to the Tour squad. Because Freuler, as a still young professional and with contracts for a full winter season of Six Days coming up, his team leader Peter Post and Freuler agreed that Freuler, although capable of taking on mountain stages, had to leave the race before the Alps would be visited. Freuler, who acted as a replacement for sprinter Jan Raas, was able to win with TI–Raleighthe two team time trials and stage 7, and left the race in stage 15. After that he never started in the Tour again.

Freuler, for the chief part of his career riding for Italian teams, did win in another of the three Grand Tours, the Giro d'Italia, from 1982 to 1989. In 1982 he won three stages, in 1984 he won four stages and in 1985 he once again claimed three stage victories. In total he won 15 stages in the Giro and also claimed the points classification in 1984.

== Personal life ==
Urs is distantly related to the Swiss footballer Remo Freuler.

== Major results ==
=== Track ===
- World champion of points race in 1981, 1982, 1983, 1984, 1985, 1986, 1987, and 1989
- World champion of Keirin in 1983 and 1985
- European champion of sprint in 1981
- 21 six-day races from 1981 to 1994, with Patrick Sercu, Robert Dill-Bundi, Hans Känel, René Pijnen, Daniel Gisiger, Horst Schütz, Dietrich Thurau, Roman Hermann, Danny Clark, Olaf Ludwig, Remig Stumpf and lastly Carsten Wolf in 1994.
- Swiss champion in 1 km time trial in 1981, 1983, 1986, and 1987
- Swiss champion of points race in 1981, 1986, 1989, 1990, 1991 and 1992
- Swiss champion of individual pursuit in 1985

=== Road ===
1981
1st Stage 7 Tour de France
1st Stage 7a Tour de Suisse
Tour de Romandie

1st Prologue & Stage 1

1982
1st Stage 2 Tour de Suisse
1st Stage 3 Giro di Sardegna
Giro d'Italia

1st Stages 4, 5 & 10

3rd Nice–Alassio
5th Grand Prix of Aargau Canton
1983
1st Stage 3 Giro del Trentino
Tour de Suisse

1st Stages 5a & 10

2nd Overall Giro di Sardegna

1st Stage 2

1984
Giro d'Italia

1st Points classification
1st Stages 2, 7, 8 & 11

3rd Trofeo Baracchi
7th Milano–Torino
9th Grand Prix des Nations
9th Critérium des As
1985
1st Grand Prix of Aargau Canton
1st Stage 10b Tour de Suisse
1st Stage 3 Giro del Trentino
1st Stage 4b Settimana Internazionale di Coppi e Bartali
Giro d'Italia

1st Stages 1, 13 & 21

4th Milano–Torino
6th Overall Giro di Puglia

1st Stage 2

8th Milan–San Remo
1986
1st Grand Prix Pino Cerami
1st Prologue Giro d'Italia
1st Stage 4 Tirreno–Adriatico
1st Stage 1 Tour de Suisse
6th Giro di Campania
1987
1st Stage 9 Giro d'Italia
1st Stage 10 Tour de Suisse
1st Stage 3 Giro di Puglia
1988
1st Stage 21a Giro d'Italia
1st Stage 10 Tour de Suisse
1st Stage 1 Danmark Rundt
1st Stage 2 Étoile de Bessèges
1989
1st Stage 10 Tour de Suisse
1st Stage 2 Tirreno–Adriatico
Giro d'Italia

1st Stages 7 & 11

Tour de Romandie

1st Stages 3a & 6

2nd Grand Prix of Aargau Canton
2nd GP Lugano
9th Paris–Roubaix
1990
1st Stage 3 Setmana Catalana de Ciclisme
Tour de Romandie

1st Stages 2a & 6
