= Aleš Trčka =

Czech cyclist

Personal information
- Born: 14 August 1961 (age 65) Prague, Czechoslovakia

Cycling career
- Sport: Cycling

Aleš Trčka (born 14 August 1961) is a Czech former cyclist. He competed for Czechoslovakia in the team pursuit event at the 1988 Summer Olympics.
