= Hans Ledermann =

Swiss cyclist (born 1957)

Personal information
- Born: 28 December 1957 (age 68) Hombrechtikon, Switzerland

Cycling career
- Sport: Cycling

Hans Ledermann (born 28 December 1957) is a Swiss former cyclist. He competed at the 1980 Summer Olympics and the 1984 Summer Olympics.
