= René Kos =

Dutch cyclist (born 1955)

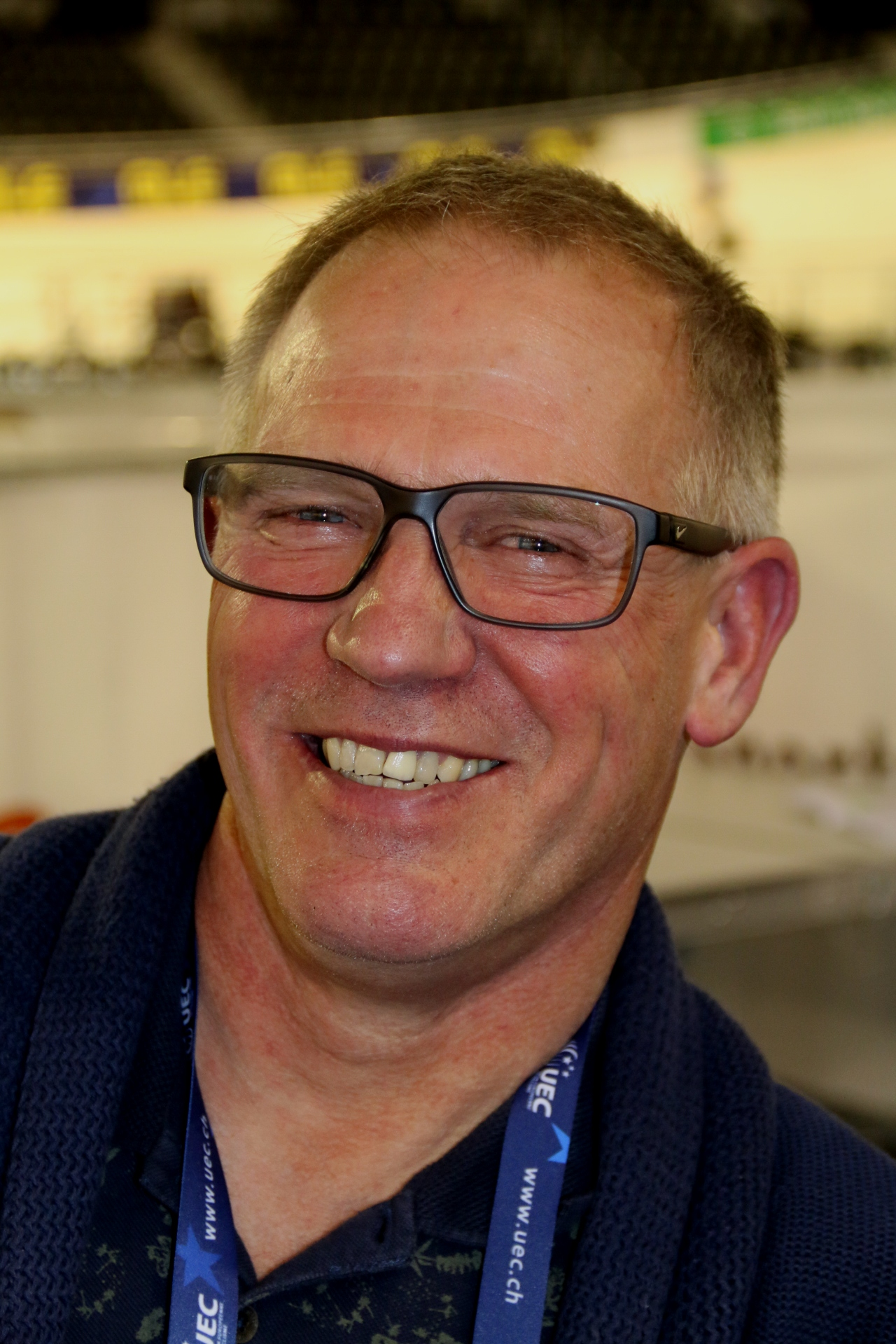
- René Kos in 2017

Personal information
- Born: 17 October 1955 (age 70) Langedijk, Netherlands

Sport
- Sport: Cycling
Medal record
Representing the Netherlands
Motor-paced World Championships
Gold medal – first place	1981 Brno	Professionals
Silver medal – second place	1983 Zurich	Professionals

René Kos (born 17 October 1955) is a retired cyclist from the Netherlands. He had his best achievements in motor-paced racing, winning the world championships in 1981 and finishing in second place in 1983; he also finished second in 1980 but was disqualified for failing the doping test. He won the national motor-paced cycling championships in 1981, 1982, 1984 and 1985.

As a track cyclist he competed in 28 six-day races with the best result of third place in the race of Buenos Aires.

After retirement he worked as a cycling coach. He was also active as a race organizer and a pacer in motor-paced racing. In 2009, he was invited to prepare the Iranian track team for the 2010 Asian Games, but had to refuse due to the uncertain security situation. He is the manager of the cycling team Koga-CreditForce-Ubbink, which includes his three sons Patrick, Jesse and Christian.

== Teams ==
- 1980 – AGU Sport
- 1981 – AGU Sport
- 1982 – individueel
- 1982 – Amko Sport
- 1983 – AGU Sport
- 1984 – Paganini
- 1985 – Panasonic
- 1986 – Timmermans IJzerhandel
- 1987 – Timmermans IJzerhandel
