= Michael Markussen =

Danish cyclist

Personal information
- Born: 9 January 1955 (age 71) Roskilde, Denmark

Cycling career
- Sport: Cycling

Michael Markussen (born 9 January 1955) is a Danish former cyclist. He competed at the 1980 Summer Olympics and the 1984 Summer Olympics.
