= Sjaak Pieters =

Dutch cyclist (born 1957)

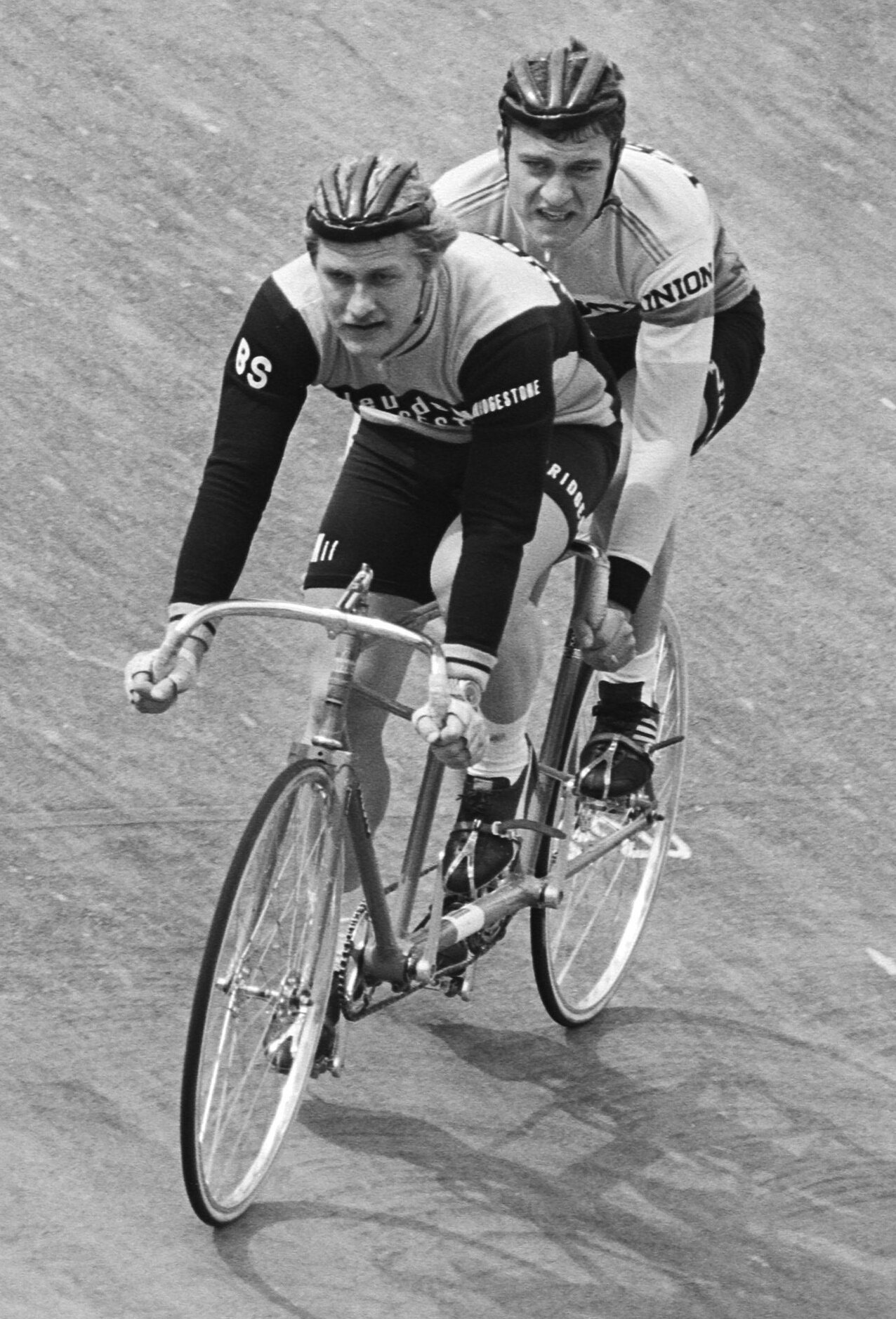

Personal information
- Born: 22 July 1957 (age 69) Zwanenburg, the Netherlands

Sport
- Sport: Cycling
Medal record
Representing the Netherlands
UCI Track Cycling World Championships
Bronze medal – third place	1978 Munich	Tandem
Bronze medal – third place	1982 Leicester	Tandem

Klaas Pieter "Sjaak" Pieters (born 22 July 1957) is a retired Dutch track cyclist who was active between 1976 and 1985. He competed at the 1976 Summer Olympics in the sprint, but failed to reach the final. He won two bronze medals in the tandem at world championships, in 1978 and 1982. He was a national champion in this event in 1977, 1978 and 1982–1985.

Pieters is married to Olympic gymnast Ans Dekker. His brother Peter and niece Amy are also Olympic cyclists.

== See also ==
- List of Dutch Olympic cyclists
