= Bruno Vicino =

Italian cyclist (born 1952)

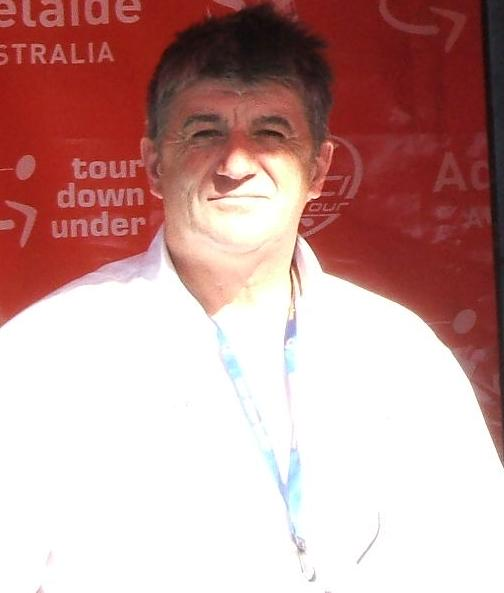

Bruno Vicino (born 7 September 1952) is an Italian former cyclist, now a directeur sportif with the Lampre cycling team. He was a professional from 1982 to 1987. He won the UCI Motor-paced World Championships three times.
