= Cycling at the 1976 Summer Olympics – Men's team pursuit =

Men's cycling team pursuit at the Games of the XXI Olympiad
- Venue: Montreal, Quebec, Canada
- Date: 23–24 July 1976
- Competitors: 64 from 16 nations

Medalists
1st place, gold medalist(s)		Gregor Braun, Günther Schumacher, Hans Lutz, Peter Vonhof	West Germany
2nd place, silver medalist(s)		Aleksandr Perov, Viktor Sokolov, Vitaly Petrakov, Vladimir Osokin	Soviet Union
3rd place, bronze medalist(s)		Ian Hallam, Ian Banbury, Michael Bennett, Robin Croker	Great Britain

These are the official results of the Men's 4.000m Team Pursuit at the 1976 Summer Olympics in Montreal, Quebec, Canada, held on 23 and 24 July 1976. There were 64 participant from 16 nations. In the first round each team raced alone, with the first eight teams qualifying for the quarterfinals.

== Competition format ==
The team pursuit competition consisted of a qualifying round and a 3-round knockout tournament, including a bronze medal race. Each race, in both the qualifying round and the knock-out rounds, consisted of two teams of 4 cyclists each starting from opposite sides of the track. The teams raced for 4,000 metres, attempting to finish with the fastest time (measured by the third rider) and, if possible, catch the other team. For the qualifying round, the eight fastest times overall (regardless of whether the team finished first or second in its heat, though any team that was overtaken was eliminated) earned advancement to the knockout rounds. In the knockout rounds, the winner of each heat advanced to the next round. Teams could change members between rounds.

== Results ==
=== Qualifying round ===
Rank	Cyclists	Nation	Time	Notes
1	Norbert Dürpisch; Thomas Huschke; Uwe Unterwalder; Matthias Wiegand	East Germany	4:23.67	Q
2	Aleksandr Perov; Viktor Sokolov; Vitaly Petrakov; Vladimir Osokin	Soviet Union	4:24.11	Q
3	Gregor Braun; Günther Schumacher; Hans Lutz; Peter Vonhof	West Germany	4:24.32	Q
4	Ian Hallam; Ian Banbury; Michael Bennett; Robin Croker	Great Britain	4:26.22	Q
5	Jan Jankiewicz; Czesław Lang; Krzysztof Sujka; Zbigniew Szczepkowski	Poland	4:27.21	Q
6	Zdeněk Dohnal; Michal Klasa; Petr Kocek; Jiří Pokorný	Czechoslovakia	4:27.43	Q
7	Sandro Callari; Cesare Cipollini; Rino De Candido; Giuseppe Saronni	Italy	4:30.47	Q
8	Gerrit Möhlmann; Gerrie Slot; Herman Ponsteen; Peter Nieuwenhuis	Netherlands	4:30.90	Q
9	Paul Bonno; Jean-Marcel Brouzes; Jean-Jacques Rebière; Pierre Trentin	France	4:31.06	
10	Leonard Nitz; Paul Deem; Ralph Therrio; Ron Skarin	United States	4:31.25	
11	Adrian Prosser; Hugh Walton; Jocelyn Lovell; Ron Hayman	Canada	4:31.90	
12	Geoff Skaines; John Thorsen; Kevin Nichols; Stephen Goodall	Australia	4:33.32	
13	Ivar Jakobsen; Kim Refshammer; Bjarne Sørensen; Kim Svendsen	Denmark	4:34.27	
14	Yoichi Machishima; Tadashi Ogasawara; Yoshiaki Ogasawara; Tsutomu Okabori	Japan	4:37.03	
15	Carlos Mesa; Jhon Quiceno; Jorge Hernández; José Jaime Galeano	Colombia	4:42.65	
16	Miguel Margalef; Víctor González; Waldemar Pedrazzi; Washington Díaz	Uruguay	4:47.82	
–	Osvaldo Benvenuti; Osvaldo Frosasco; Juan Carlos Haedo; Raul Labbate	Argentina	DNS	

=== Quarterfinals ===
==== Quarterfinal 1 ====
Rank	Cyclists	Nation	Time	Notes
1	Ian Hallam; Ian Banbury; Michael Bennett; Robin Croker	Great Britain	4:23.78	Q
2	Jan Jankiewicz; Czesław Lang; Krzysztof Sujka; Zbigniew Szczepkowski	Poland	4:27.21	

==== Quarterfinal 2 ====
Rank	Cyclists	Nation	Time	Notes
1	Gregor Braun; Günther Schumacher; Hans Lutz; Peter Vonhof	West Germany	4:20.10	Q
2	Zdeněk Dohnal; Michal Klasa; Petr Kocek; Jiří Pokorný	Czechoslovakia	4:30.11	

==== Quarterfinal 3 ====
Rank	Cyclists	Nation	Time	Notes
1	Aleksandr Perov; Viktor Sokolov; Vitaly Petrakov; Vladimir Osokin	Soviet Union	4:21.31	Q
2	Sandro Callari; Cesare Cipollini; Rino De Candido; Giuseppe Saronni	Italy	Overtaken	

==== Quarterfinal 4 ====
Rank	Cyclists	Nation	Time	Notes
1	Norbert Dürpisch; Thomas Huschke; Uwe Unterwalder; Matthias Wiegand	East Germany	4:22.69	Q
2	Gerrit Möhlmann; Gerrie Slot; Herman Ponsteen; Peter Nieuwenhuis	Netherlands	4:30.39	

=== Semifinals ===
==== Semifinal 1 ====
Rank	Cyclists	Nation	Time	Notes
1	Aleksandr Perov; Viktor Sokolov; Vitaly Petrakov; Vladimir Osokin	Soviet Union	4:20.95	Q
2	|Norbert Dürpisch; Thomas Huschke; Uwe Unterwalder; Matthias Wiegand	East Germany	4:25.23	B

==== Semifinal 2 ====
Rank	Cyclists	Nation	Time	Notes
1	Gregor Braun; Günther Schumacher; Hans Lutz; Peter Vonhof	West Germany	4:23.04	Q
2	Ian Hallam; Ian Banbury; Michael Bennett; Robin Croker	Great Britain	4:28.04	B

=== Finals ===
==== Bronze medal match ====
Rank	Cyclists	Nation	Time
3rd place, bronze medalist(s)	Ian Hallam; Ian Banbury; Michael Bennett; Robin Croker	Great Britain	4:22.41
4	Norbert Dürpisch; Thomas Huschke; Uwe Unterwalder; Matthias Wiegand	East Germany	4:22.75

==== Final ====
Rank	Cyclists	Nation	Time
1st place, gold medalist(s)	Gregor Braun; Günther Schumacher; Hans Lutz; Peter Vonhof	West Germany	4:21.06
2nd place, silver medalist(s)	Aleksandr Perov; Viktor Sokolov; Vitaly Petrakov; Vladimir Osokin	Soviet Union	4:27.15

== Final classification ==
RANK	NAME CYCLISTS	TEAM
1st place, gold medalist(s)	Gregor Braun; Günther Schumacher; Hans Lutz; Peter Vonhof	West Germany
2nd place, silver medalist(s)	Aleksandr Perov; Viktor Sokolov; Vitaly Petrakov; Vladimir Osokin	Soviet Union
3rd place, bronze medalist(s)	Ian Hallam; Ian Banbury; Michael Bennett; Robin Croker	Great Britain
4.	Norbert Dürpisch; Thomas Huschke; Uwe Unterwalder; Matthias Wiegand	East Germany
5.	Zdeněk Dohnal; Michal Klasa; Petr Kocek; Jiří Pokorný	Czechoslovakia
5.	Gerrit Möhlmann; Gerrie Slot; Herman Ponsteen; Peter Nieuwenhuis	Netherlands
5.	Sandro Callari; Cesare Cipollini; Rino De Candido; Giuseppe Saronni	Italy
5.	Jan Jankiewicz; Czesław Lang; Krzysztof Sujka; Zbigniew Szczepkowski	Poland
9.	Paul Bonno; Jean-Marcel Brouzes; Jean-Jacques Rebière; Pierre Trentin	France
10.	Leonard Nitz; Paul Deem; Ralph Therrio; Ron Skarin	United States
11.	Adrian Prosser; Hugh Walton; Jocelyn Lovell; Ron Hayman	Canada
12.	Geoff Skaines; John Thorsen; Kevin Nichols; Stephen Goodall	Australia
13.	Ivar Jakobsen; Kim Refshammer; Bjarne Sørensen; Kim Svendsen	Denmark
14.	Yoichi Machishima; Tadashi Ogasawara; Yoshiaki Ogasawara; Tsutomu Okabori	Japan
15.	Carlos Mesa; Jhon Quiceno; Jorge Hernández; José Jaime Galeano	Colombia
16.	Miguel Margalef; Víctor González; Waldemar Pedrazzi; Washington Díaz	Uruguay
