= 1975 UCI Track Cycling World Championships =

- Venue: Rocourt, Belgium
- Date: 1975
- Velodrome: Stade Vélodrome de Rocourt
- Events: 11

The 1975 UCI Track Cycling World Championships were the World Championship for track cycling. They took place in Rocourt, Belgium in 1975. Eleven events were contested, 9 for men (3 for professionals, 6 for amateurs) and 2 for women.

In the same period, the 1975 UCI Road World Championships were organized in Mettet and Yvoir.

== Medal summary ==
Event	Gold	Silver	Bronze
Men's Professional Events
Men's sprint	John Nicholson; Australia	Peder Pedersen; Denmark	Ryoji Abe (阿部良二); Japan
Men's individual pursuit	Roy Schuiten; Netherlands	Knut Knudsen; Norway	Dirk Baert; Belgium
Men's motor-paced	Dieter Kemper; West Germany	Cees Stam; Netherlands	Jean Breuer; Belgium
Men's Amateur Events
Men's 1 km time trial	Klaus-Jürgen Grünke; East Germany	Eduard Rapp; Soviet Union	Janusz Kierzkowski; Poland
Men's sprint	Daniel Morelon; France	Giorgio Rossi; Italy	Emanuel Raasch; East Germany
Men's individual pursuit	Thomas Huschke; East Germany	Vladimir Osokin; Soviet Union	Orfeo Pizzoferrato; Italy
Men's team pursuit	West Germany; Günther Schumacher; Peter Vonhof; Hans Lutz; Gregor Braun	Soviet Union; Vladimir Osokin; Vitali Petrakov; Viktor Sokolov; Alexandre Perov	East Germany; Norbert Dürpisch; Thomas Huschke; Uwe Unterwalder; Klaus-Jürgen Grünke
Men's motor-paced	Gaby Minneboo; Netherlands	Miguel Espinos; Spain	Jean Pinsello; France
Men's tandem	Poland; Benedykt Kocot; Janusz Kotlinski	Czechoslovakia; Vladimír Vačkář; Miloslav Vymazal	Soviet Union; Anatoly Iablunowsky; Sergei Komelkov
Women's Events
Women's sprint	Sue Novara; United States	Iva Zajíčková; Czechoslovakia	Sheila Young; United States
Women's individual pursuit	Keetie Hage; Netherlands	Mary Jane Reoch; United States	Denise Burton; Great Britain

== Medal table ==
Rank	Nation	Gold	Silver	Bronze	Total
1	Netherlands (NED)	3	1	0	4
2	East Germany (GDR)	2	0	2	4
3	West Germany (FRG)	2	0	0	2
4	United States (USA)	1	1	0	2
5	France (FRA)	1	0	1	2
5	Poland (POL)	1	0	1	2
7	Australia (AUS)	1	0	0	1
8	Soviet Union (URS)	0	3	2	5
9	Czechoslovakia (TCH)	0	2	0	2
10	Italy (ITA)	0	1	1	2
11	Denmark (DEN)	0	1	0	1
11	Norway (NOR)	0	1	0	1
11	Spain (ESP)	0	1	0	1
14	Belgium (BEL)	0	0	2	2
15	Great Britain (GBR)	0	0	1	1
15	Japan (JPN)	0	0	1	1
Totals (16 entries)		11	11	11	33

== See also ==
- 1975 UCI Road World Championships
