= 1978 UCI Track Cycling World Championships =

Track cycling world championships in Munich, West Germany

- Venue: Munich, West Germany
- Date: 16–21 August 1978
- Velodrome: Munich Olympic Velodrome
- Events: 12

The 1978 UCI Track Cycling World Championships were the world championships for track cycling. They took place in Munich, West Germany, in 1978. Twelve events were contested: ten for men (three for professionals, seven for amateurs) and two for women.

In the same period, the 1978 UCI Road World Championships were organized in Nürburg.

== Medal summary ==
Event	Gold	Silver	Bronze
Men's professional events
Men's sprint	Kōichi Nakano; Japan	Dieter Berkmann; West Germany	Yoshi Sugata (菅田順和); Japan
Men's individual pursuit	Gregor Braun; West Germany	Roy Schuiten; Netherlands	Jean-Luc Vandenbroucke; Belgium
Men's motor-paced	Wilfried Peffgen; West Germany	Martin Venix; Netherlands	Cees Stam; Netherlands
Men's amateur events
Men's 1 km time trial	Lothar Thoms; East Germany	Jocelyn Lovell; Canada	Rainer Hönisch; East Germany
Men's sprint	Anton Tkáč; Czechoslovakia	Emanuel Raasch; East Germany	Christian Drescher; East Germany
Men's individual pursuit	Detlef Macha; East Germany	Norbert Dürpisch; East Germany	Uwe Unterwalder; East Germany
Men's team pursuit	East Germany; Uwe Unterwalder; Gerald Mortag; Matthias Wiegand; Volker Winkler	Soviet Union; Vladimir Osokin; Vassili Ehrlich; Vitali Petrakov; Igor Pilipenko	Switzerland; Robert Dill-Bundi; Urs Freuler; Hans Kaenel; Walter Baumgartner
Men's points race	Noël Dejonckheere; Belgium	Walter Baumgartner; Switzerland	Jean-Jacques Rebiere; France
Men's motor-paced	Rainer Podlesch; West Germany	Mattheus Pronk; Netherlands	Martin Rietveld; Netherlands
Men's tandem	Czechoslovakia; Vladimír Vačkář; Miloslav Vymazal	United States; Gerald Ash; Leslie Darcewski	Netherlands; Sjaak Pieters; Laurens Veldt
Women's events
Women's sprint	Galina Tsareva; Soviet Union	Sue Novara; United States	Iva Zajíčková; Czechoslovakia
Women's individual pursuit	Keetie van Oosten-Hage; Netherlands	Anna Riemersma; Netherlands	Luigina Bissoli; Italy

== Medal table ==
Rank	Nation	Gold	Silver	Bronze	Total
1	East Germany (GDR)	3	2	3	8
2	West Germany (FRG)	3	1	0	4
3	Czechoslovakia (TCH)	2	0	1	3
4	Netherlands (NED)	1	4	3	8
5	Soviet Union (URS)	1	1	0	2
6	Belgium (BEL)	1	0	1	2
6	Japan (JPN)	1	0	1	2
8	United States (USA)	0	2	0	2
9	Switzerland (SUI)	0	1	1	2
10	Canada (CAN)	0	1	0	1
11	France (FRA)	0	0	1	1
11	Italy (ITA)	0	0	1	1
Totals (12 entries)		12	12	12	36

== See also ==
- 1978 UCI Road World Championships
