= Cycling at the 1976 Summer Olympics =

Cycling at the Games of the XXI Olympiad
- Venues: Mont Royal Park; Montreal Olympic Velodrome
- Date: 18 -24 July 1976
- Competitors: 295 from 49 nations

The cycling competition at the 1976 Summer Olympics in Montreal consisted of two road cycling events and four track cycling events, all for men only. The 2000m tandem event, contested at the previous 13 Games since 1908, was dropped from the Olympic cycling program.

== Medal summary ==
=== Road cycling ===
Event	Gold	Silver	Bronze
Individual road race	Bernt Johansson; Sweden	Giuseppe Martinelli; Italy	Mieczysław Nowicki; Poland
Team time trial	Soviet Union; Aavo Pikkuus; Valery Chaplygin; Anatoly Chukanov; Vladimir Kaminsky	Poland; Ryszard Szurkowski; Tadeusz Mytnik; Mieczysław Nowicki; Stanisław Szozda	Denmark; Jørn Lund; Verner Blaudzun; Gert Frank; Jørgen Hansen

=== Track cycling ===
Games	Gold	Silver	Bronze
Individual pursuit	Gregor Braun; West Germany	Herman Ponsteen; Netherlands	Thomas Huschke; East Germany
Team pursuit	West Germany; Peter Vonhof; Gregor Braun; Hans Lutz; Günther Schumacher	Soviet Union; Viktor Sokolov; Vladimir Osokin; Aleksandr Perov; Vitaly Petrakov	Great Britain; Ian Hallam; Ian Banbury; Michael Bennett; Robin Croker
Sprint	Anton Tkáč; Czechoslovakia	Daniel Morelon; France	Jürgen Geschke; East Germany
1 km time trial	Klaus-Jürgen Grünke; East Germany	Michel Vaarten; Belgium	Niels Fredborg; Denmark

== Participating nations ==
295 cyclists from 49 nations competed.

- Antigua and Barbuda (2)
- Argentina (4)
- Australia (12)
- Austria (6)
- Barbados (2)
- Belgium (7)
- Bolivia (1)
- Bulgaria (6)
- Cameroon (4)
- Canada (11)
- Chile (2)
- Colombia (11)
- Costa Rica (1)

- Cuba (6)
- Czechoslovakia (11)
- Denmark (11)
- East Germany (11)
- Finland (1)
- France (14)
- Great Britain (11)
- Greece (1)
- Hong Kong (4)
- Hungary (1)
- Iran (7)
- Ireland (2)

- Italy (14)
- Jamaica (3)
- Japan (5)
- Luxembourg (2)
- Malaysia (1)
- Mexico (2)
- Netherlands (12)
- New Zealand (4)
- Nicaragua (4)
- Norway (8)
- Poland (11)
- San Marino (1)

- Soviet Union (12)
- Spain (4)
- Sweden (6)
- Switzerland (6)
- Thailand (6)
- Trinidad and Tobago (2)
- Turkey (1)
- United States (13)
- Uruguay (5)
- Venezuela (6)
- West Germany (12)
- Yugoslavia (2)

== Medal table ==
Rank	Nation	Gold	Silver	Bronze	Total
1	West Germany	2	0	0	2
2	Soviet Union	1	1	0	2
3	East Germany	1	0	2	3
4	Czechoslovakia	1	0	0	1
4	Sweden	1	0	0	1
6	Poland	0	1	1	2
7	Belgium	0	1	0	1
7	France	0	1	0	1
7	Italy	0	1	0	1
7	Netherlands	0	1	0	1
11	Denmark	0	0	2	2
12	Great Britain	0	0	1	1
Totals (12 entries)		6	6	6	18
