= 1974 UCI Track Cycling World Championships =

- Venue: Montreal, Quebec, Canada
- Date: 1974
- Velodrome: Université de Montréal velodrome
- Events: 11

The 1974 UCI Track Cycling World Championships were the World Championship for track cycling. They took place between 14–20 August 1974 on a temporary wooden velodrome at the Université de Montréal in Montreal, Quebec, Canada. It was the first time in the event’s 75-year history that it was held outside of Europe. Eleven events were contested, 9 for men (3 for professionals, 6 for amateurs) and 2 for women.

In the same period, the 1974 UCI Road World Championships were also organized in Montréal.

== Medal summary ==
Event	Gold	Silver	Bronze
Men's Professional Events
Men's sprint	Peder Pedersen; Denmark	John Nicholson; Australia	Robert Van Lancker; Belgium
Men's individual pursuit	Roy Schuiten; Netherlands	Ferdinand Bracke; Belgium	René Pijnen; Netherlands
Men's motor-paced	Cees Stam; Netherlands	Theo Verschueren; Belgium	Attilio Benfatto; Italy
Men's Amateur Events
Men's 1 km time trial	Eduard Rapp; Soviet Union	Ferruccio Ferro; Italy	Janusz Kierzkowski; Poland
Men's sprint	Anton Tkáč; Czechoslovakia	Sergeï Kravtsov; Soviet Union	Giorgio Rossi; Italy
Men's individual pursuit	Hans Lutz; West Germany	Orfeo Pizzoferrato; Italy	Thomas Huschke; East Germany
Men's team pursuit	West Germany; Günther Schumacher; Peter Vonhof; Hans Lutz; Dietrich Thurau	East Germany; Thomas Huschke; Heinz Richter; Uwe Unterwalder; Klaus-Jürgen Grünke	Czechoslovakia; Jaromír Doležal; Petr Kocek; Michal Klasa; Milan Puzrla
Men's motor-paced	Jean Breuer; West Germany	Martin Venix; Netherlands	Miguel Espinos; Spain
Men's tandem	Czechoslovakia; Vladimír Vačkář; Miloslav Vymazal	Soviet Union; Viktor Kopylov; Vladimir Semenets	Poland; Benedykt Kocot; Andrzej Bek
Women's Events
Women's sprint	Tamara Piltsikova; Soviet Union	Sue Novara; United States	Galina Tsareva; Soviet Union
Women's individual pursuit	Tamara Garkuchina; Soviet Union	Valentina Smirnova; Soviet Union	Keetie Hage; Netherlands

== Medal table ==
Rank	Nation	Gold	Silver	Bronze	Total
1	Soviet Union (URS)	3	3	1	7
2	West Germany (FRG)	3	0	0	3
3	Netherlands (NED)	2	1	2	5
4	Czechoslovakia (TCH)	2	0	1	3
5	Denmark (DEN)	1	0	0	1
6	Italy (ITA)	0	2	2	4
7	Belgium (BEL)	0	2	1	3
8	East Germany (GDR)	0	1	1	2
9	Australia (AUS)	0	1	0	1
9	United States (USA)	0	1	0	1
11	Poland (POL)	0	0	2	2
12	Spain (ESP)	0	0	1	1
Totals (12 entries)		11	11	11	33

== See also ==
- 1974 UCI Road World Championships
