= Denmark at the 1976 Summer Olympics =

- IOC code: DEN
- NOC: Danish Olympic Committee

in Montreal
- Competitors: 66 (56 men, 10 women) in 15 sports
- Flag bearer: Judith Andersen
- Medals Ranked 24th: Gold 1 Silver 0 Bronze 2 Total 3

Summer Olympics appearances (overview)
- 1896; 1900; 1904; 1908; 1912; 1920; 1924; 1928; 1932; 1936; 1948; 1952; 1956; 1960; 1964; 1968; 1972; 1976; 1980; 1984; 1988; 1992; 1996; 2000; 2004; 2008; 2012; 2016; 2020; 2024

Other related appearances
- 1906 Intercalated Games

Denmark competed at the 1976 Summer Olympics in Montreal, Quebec, Canada. 66 competitors, 56 men and 10 women, took part in 40 events in 15 sports, winning a total number of three medals.

== Medalists ==
=== Gold ===
- Valdemar Bandolowski, Erik Hansen and Poul Richard Høj Jensen – Sailing, Men's Soling class

=== Bronze ===
- Niels Fredborg – Cycling, Men's 1000 metres time trial
- Verner Blaudzun, Gert Frank, Jørgen Hansen and Jørn Lund – Cycling, Men's team time trial

== Archery ==
Olympic veteran Arne Jacobsen was the only archer to represent Denmark in the nation's second appearance in the Olympic archery competition. He dropped 89 points from his previous mark, falling 17 places in the standings.

Men's Individual Competition:

- Arne Jacobsen – 2334 points (→ 25th place)

== Athletics ==
Men's Marathon

- Jørgen Jensen – 2:20:44 (→ 28th place)

Men's High Jump

- Jesper Tørring
  - Qualification – 2.16m
  - Final – 2.18m (→ 8th place)

== Boxing ==
Men's Lightweight

- Hans Henrik Palm (15th=)

Men's Welterweight

- Ib Bøtcher (17th=)

Men's Light middleweight

- Poul Frandsen (17th=)

== Cycling ==
Eleven cyclists represented Denmark in 1976.

Individual road race

- Verner Blaudzun – did not finish (→ no ranking)
- Jørgen Emil Hansen – did not finish (→ no ranking)
- Bent Pedersen – did not finish (→ no ranking)
- Willy Skibby – did not finish (→ no ranking)

Team time trial

- Verner Blaudzun
- Gert Frank
- Jørgen Emil Hansen
- Jørn Lund

Sprint

- Niels Fredborg – 6th place

1000m time trial

- Niels Fredborg – 1:07.617 (→ Bronze Medal)

Team pursuit

- Ivar Jakobsen
- Kim Refshammer
- Bjarne Sørensen
- Kim Svendsen

== Fencing ==
One female fencer represented Denmark in 1976.

Women's foil

- Annie Madsen

== Modern pentathlon ==
Two male pentathletes represented Denmark in 1976.

Individual

- Jørn Steffensen
- Klaus Petersen

== Sailing ==
Open

Athlete	Event	Race							Net points	Final rank
Athlete	Event	1	2	3	4	5	6	7	Net points	Final rank
Jørgen Lindhardsen	Finn	15	11	11	~~21~~	8	16	9	106.0	14
Lars Lønberg; Dan Ibsen Sørensen	470	7	5	~~22~~	20	22	3	11	99.7	12
Peter Due; Per Kjaergaard	Tornado	4	5	~~13~~	3	12	11	10	74.7	9
Claes Thunbo Christensen; Finn Thunbo Christensen	Tempest	6	~~9~~	8	8	1	5	7	62.7	6
Poul Richard Høj Jensen; Valdemar Bandolowski; Erik Hansen	Soling	2	2	~~13~~	6	13	1	5	46.7	Gold medal

== Shooting ==
Bo Lilja
