= 1977 UCI Track Cycling World Championships =

- Venue: San Cristóbal, Venezuela
- Date: 22–26 August 1977
- Velodrome: José de Jesús Mora Figueroa Velodrome
- Events: 12

The 1977 UCI Track Cycling World Championships were the World Championship for track cycling. They took place in San Cristóbal, Venezuela in 1977. Twelve events were contested, 10 for men (3 for professionals, 7 for amateurs) and 2 for women.

In the same period, the 1977 UCI Road World Championships were also organized in San Cristóbal.

== Medal summary ==
| Event | Gold | Silver | Bronze |
|---|---|---|---|
Men's Professional Events
| Men's sprint | Kōichi Nakano; Japan | Yoshikazu Sugata (菅田順和); Japan | John Nicholson; Australia |
| Men's individual pursuit | Gregor Braun; West Germany | Knut Knudsen; Norway | Steve Heffernan; Great Britain |
| Men's motor-paced | Cees Stam; Netherlands | Wilfried Peffgen; West Germany | Pietro Algeri; Italy |
Men's Amateur Events
| Men's 1 km time trial | Lothar Thoms; East Germany | Günther Schumacher; West Germany | Hans Ledermann; Switzerland |
| Men's sprint | Hans-Jürgen Geschke; East Germany | Emanuel Raasch; East Germany | Lutz Heßlich; East Germany |
| Men's individual pursuit | Norbert Dürpisch; East Germany | Uwe Unterwalder; East Germany | Daniel Gisiger; Switzerland |
| Men's team pursuit | East Germany; Norbert Dürpisch; Gerald Mortag; Matthias Wiegand; Volker Winkler | West Germany; Günther Schumacher; Peter Vonhof; Hans Lutz; Henry Rincklin | Switzerland; Robert Dill-Bundi; Daniel Gisiger; Hans Kaenel; Walter Baumgartner |
| Men's points race | Constant Tourné; Belgium | Jan Faltyn; Poland | Nikolaï Makarov; Soviet Union |
| Men's motor-paced | Gaby Minneboo; Netherlands | Bartolome Caldentey; Spain | Rainer Podlesch; West Germany |
| Men's tandem | Czechoslovakia; Vladimír Vačkář; Miloslav Vymazal | Soviet Union; Vladimir Semenets; Aleksander Voronine | West Germany; Horst Gewis; Wolfgang Schaffer |
Women's Events
| Women's sprint | Galina Tsareva; Soviet Union | Sue Novara; United States | Iva Zajíčková; Czechoslovakia |
| Women's individual pursuit | Vera Kuznetsova; Soviet Union | Anna Riemersma; Netherlands | Karen Strong; Canada |

== Medal table ==
| Rank | Nation | Gold | Silver | Bronze | Total |
|---|---|---|---|---|---|
| 1 | East Germany (GDR) | 4 | 2 | 1 | 7 |
| 2 | Soviet Union (URS) | 2 | 1 | 1 | 4 |
| 3 | Netherlands (NED) | 2 | 1 | 0 | 3 |
| 4 | West Germany (FRG) | 1 | 3 | 2 | 6 |
| 5 | Japan (JPN) | 1 | 1 | 0 | 2 |
| 6 | Czechoslovakia (TCH) | 1 | 0 | 1 | 2 |
| 7 | Belgium (BEL) | 1 | 0 | 0 | 1 |
| 8 | Norway (NOR) | 0 | 1 | 0 | 1 |
| 8 | Poland (POL) | 0 | 1 | 0 | 1 |
| 8 | Spain (ESP) | 0 | 1 | 0 | 1 |
| 8 | United States (USA) | 0 | 1 | 0 | 1 |
| 12 | Switzerland (SUI) | 0 | 0 | 3 | 3 |
| 13 | Australia (AUS) | 0 | 0 | 1 | 1 |
| 13 | Canada (CAN) | 0 | 0 | 1 | 1 |
| 13 | Great Britain (GBR) | 0 | 0 | 1 | 1 |
| 13 | Italy (ITA) | 0 | 0 | 1 | 1 |
| Totals (16 entries) | | 12 | 12 | 12 | 36 |

== See also ==
- 1977 UCI Road World Championships
