= 1979 UCI Track Cycling World Championships =

- Venue: Amsterdam, Netherlands
- Date: 29 August–2 September 1979
- Velodrome: Olympisch Stadion
- Events: 12

The 1979 UCI Track Cycling World Championships were the World Championship for track cycling. They took place in Amsterdam, Netherlands in 1979. Twelve events were contested, 10 for men (3 for professionals, 7 for amateurs) and 2 for women.

In the same period, the 1979 UCI Road World Championships were organized in Valkenburg.

== Medal summary ==
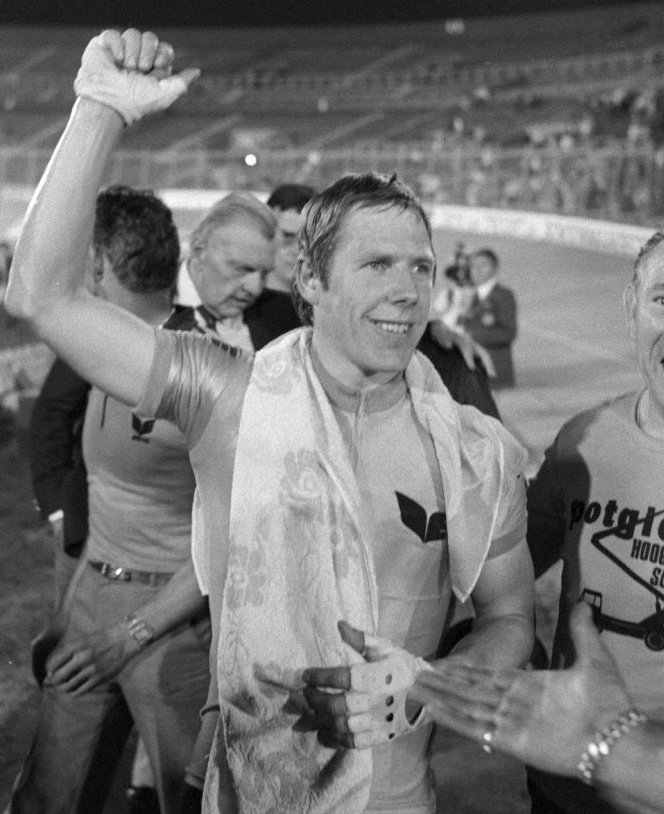
Mattheus Pronk won the amateur motor-paced

Event	Gold	Silver	Bronze
Men's Professional Events
Men's sprint	Kōichi Nakano; Japan	Dieter Berkmann; West Germany	Michel Vaarten; Belgium
Men's individual pursuit	Bert Oosterbosch; Netherlands	Francesco Moser; Italy	Herman Ponsteen; Netherlands
Men's motor-paced	Martin Venix; Netherlands	Wilfried Peffgen; West Germany	Cees Stam; Netherlands
Men's Amateur Events
Men's 1 km time trial	Lothar Thoms; East Germany	Gordon Singleton; Canada	Eduard Rapp; Soviet Union
Men's sprint	Lutz Heßlich; East Germany	Emanuel Raasch; East Germany	Christian Drescher; East Germany
Men's individual pursuit	Nikolaï Makarov; Soviet Union	Maurizio Bidinost; Italy	Alain Bondue; France
Men's team pursuit	East Germany; Lutz Haueisen; Gerald Mortag; Axel Grosser; Volker Winkler	Soviet Union; Viktor Manakov; Vassili Ehrlich; Vladimir Osokin; Vitali Petrakov	Italy; Maurizio Bidinost; Pierangelo Bincoletto; Silvestro Milani; Sandro Callari
Men's points race	Igor Sláma; Czechoslovakia	Pierangelo Bincoletto; Italy	Urs Freuler; Switzerland
Men's motor-paced	Mattheus Pronk; Netherlands	Guido Van Meel; Belgium	Gaby Minneboo; Netherlands
Men's tandem	France; Yavé Cahard; Franck Depine	West Germany; Dieter Giebken; Fredy Schmidtke	Czechoslovakia; Vladimír Vačkář; Miloslav Vymazal
Women's Events
Women's sprint	Galina Tsareva; Soviet Union	Truus van der Plaat; Netherlands	Sue Novara; United States
Women's individual pursuit	Keetie van Oosten-Hage; Netherlands	Anna Riemersma; Netherlands	Luigina Bissoli; Italy

== Medal table ==
Rank	Nation	Gold	Silver	Bronze	Total
1	Netherlands (NED)	4	2	3	9
2	East Germany (GDR)	3	1	1	5
3	Soviet Union (URS)	2	1	1	4
4	Czechoslovakia (TCH)	1	0	1	2
4	France (FRA)	1	0	1	2
6	Japan (JPN)	1	0	0	1
7	Italy (ITA)	0	3	2	5
8	West Germany (FRG)	0	3	0	3
9	Belgium (BEL)	0	1	1	2
10	Canada (CAN)	0	1	0	1
11	Switzerland (SUI)	0	0	1	1
11	United States (USA)	0	0	1	1
Totals (12 entries)		12	12	12	36

== See also ==
- 1979 UCI Road World Championships
