= Poland at the UCI Track Cycling World Championships =

- IOC code: POL
- Medals: Gold 8 Silver 7 Bronze 7 Total 22

UCI Track Cycling World Championships appearances (overview)
- Recent: 2008; 2009; 2010; 2011; 2012; 2013; 2014; 2015; 2016; 2017; 2018; 2019; 2020; 2021; 2022; 2023; 2024; 2025

This page is an overview of Poland at the UCI Track Cycling World Championships.

== List of medalists ==
This is a list of Polish medals won at the UCI Track World Championships.

Medal	Championship	Name	Event
Silver	1967 Amsterdam	Waclaw Latocha	Men's 1 km time trial
Silver	1969 Antwerp	Janusz Kierzkowski	Men's 1 km time trial
Gold	1973 San Sebastián	Janusz Kierzkowski	Men's 1 km time trial
Bronze	1974 Montreal	Benedykt Kocot; Andrzej Bek	Men's tandem
Bronze	1974 Montreal	Janusz Kierzkowski	Men's 1 km time trial
Gold	1975 Rocourt	Benedykt Kocot; Janusz Kotlinski	Men's tandem
Bronze	1975 Rocourt	Janusz Kierzkowski	Men's 1 km time trial
Gold	1976 Monteroni di Lecce	Benedykt Kocot; Janusz Kotlinski	Men's tandem
Silver	1977 San Cristóbal	Jan Faltyn	Men's points race
Bronze	1981 Brno	Ryszard Konkolewski; Zbigniew Piątek	Men's tandem
Silver	1985 Ghent	Ryszard Dawidowicz; Marian Turowski; Leszek Stępniewski; Andrzej Sikorski	Men's team pursuit
Gold	1988 Ghent	Lech Piasecki	Men's individual pursuit
Bronze	2001 Antwerp	Grzegorz Krejner	Men's 1 km time trial
Silver	2006 Bordeaux	Rafał Ratajczyk	Men's points race
Bronze	2007 Palma de Mallorca	Rafał Ratajczyk	Men's scratch
Gold	2012 Melbourne	Katarzyna Pawłowska	Women's scratch
Gold	2013 Minsk	Katarzyna Pawłowska	Women's scratch
Silver	2014 Cali	Katarzyna Pawłowska	Women's scratch
Gold	2016 London	Katarzyna Pawłowska	Women's points race
Silver	2016 London	Małgorzata Wojtyra	Women's individual pursuit
Gold	2017 Hong Kong	Adrian Tekliński	Men's scratch
Bronze	2017 Hong Kong	Wojciech Pszczolarski	Men's points race
Gold	2018 Apeldoorn	Szymon Sajnok	Men's omnium

== Most successful Polish competitors ==
Name	Medals	Championships
Katarzyna Pawłowska	3 gold, 1 silver, 0 bronze	(gold) 2012 Melbourne – Women's scratch (gold) 2013 Minsk – Women's scratch (gold) 2016 London – Women's points race (silver) 2014 Cali – Women's scratch
Benedykt Kocot	2 gold, 0 silver, 1 bronze	(gold) 1975 Rocourt – Men's tandem (gold) 1976 Monteroni di Lecce – Men's tandem (bronze) 1974 Montreal – Men's tandem
Janusz Kotlinski	2 gold, 0 silver, 0 bronze	(gold) 1975 Rocourt – Men's tandem (gold) 1976 Monteroni di Lecce – Men's tandem
Janusz Kierzkowski	1 gold, 1 silver, 2 bronze	(gold) 1973 San Sebastián – Men's 1 km time trial (silver) 1969 Antwerp – Men's 1 km time trial (bronze) 1974 Montreal – Men's 1 km time trial (bronze) 1975 Rocourt – Men's 1 km time trial
Rafał Ratajczyk	0 gold, 1 silver, 1 bronze	(silver) 2006 Bordeaux – Men's points race (bronze) 2007 Palma de Mallorca – Men's scratch

=== Medals by discipline ===
updated after the 2017 UCI Track Cycling World Championships

Event	Gold	Silver	Bronze	Total
Women's scratch	2	1	0	3
Men's tandem	2	0	2	4
Men's 1 km time trial	1	2	3	6
Men's scratch	1	0	1	2
Women's points race	1	0	0	1
Men's individual pursuit	1	0	0	1
Men's points race	0	2	1	3
Women's individual pursuit	0	1	0	1
Men's team pursuit	0	1	0	1
Total	8	7	7	22

== 2015 UCI Track Cycling World Championships ==
Poland at the 2015 UCI Track Cycling World Championships
- IOC code: POL

in Saint-Quentin-en-Yvelines, France 18 February – 22 February 2015
- Competitors: 14
- Medals Ranked -th: Gold 0 Silver 0 Bronze 0 Total 0

UCI Track Cycling World Championships appearances (overview)
- Overview page Recent: 2008; 2009; 2010; 2011; 2012; 2013; 2014; 2015; 2016; 2017; 2018; 2019; 2020; 2021; 2022; 2023; 2024; 2025

Poland competed at the 2015 UCI Track Cycling World Championships in Saint-Quentin-en-Yvelines at the Vélodrome de Saint-Quentin-en-Yvelines from 18 to 22 February 2015. A team of 14 cyclists (6 women, 8 men) was announced to represent the country in the event.

== Results ==
=== Men ===
Name	Event	Result	Rank
Damian Zieliński	Men's sprint	9.905 (Q),	21
Mateusz Lipa	Men's sprint	10.100	31
Kamil Kuczyński	Men's 1 km time trial	1:01.583	10
Adrian Tekliński	Men's scratch	—	16
Wojciech Pszczolarski	Men's points race	5 points	14
Krzysztof Maksel	Men's keirin		12
Kamil Kuczyński	Men's keirin		25
Krzysztof Maksel; Rafał Sarnecki; Damian Zieliński	Men's team sprint	43.481	7

=== Women ===
Name	Event	Result	Rank
Eugenia Bujak	Women's individual pursuit	3:39.636	13
Edyta Jasińska	Women's individual pursuit	3:44.505	16
Katarzyna Pawłowska	Women's points race	1 points	16
Małgorzata Wojtyra	Women's omnium	58 points	19
Katarzyna Pawłowska	Women's scratch	—	16
Katarzyna Pawłowska; Małgorzata Wojtyra; Eugenia Bujak; Natalia Rutkowska	Women's team pursuit	4:34.620	10

== 2016 UCI Track Cycling World Championships ==
Poland at the 2016 UCI Track Cycling World Championships
- IOC code: POL

in London, United Kingdom 2 March – 6 March 2016
- Competitors: 17 (10 men, 7 women)
- Medals: Gold 0 Silver 1 Bronze 0 Total 1

UCI Track Cycling World Championships appearances (overview)
- Recent: 2008; 2009; 2010; 2011; 2012; 2013; 2014; 2015; 2016; 2017; 2018; 2019; 2020; 2021; 2022; 2023; 2024; 2025

Poland competed at the 2016 UCI Track Cycling World Championships at the Lee Valley VeloPark in London, United Kingdom from 2–4 March 2016. A team of 17 cyclists (7 women, 10 men) was announced to represent the country in the event.

== Results ==
=== Men ===
Name	Event	Result	Rank
Damian Zieliński	Men's sprint		4
Kamil Kuczyński	Men's sprint		13
Krzysztof Maksel	Men's 1 km time trial	01:01.597	4
Mateusz Lipa	Men's 1 km time trial	01:02.908	13
Rafal Sarnecki	Men's keirin	—	17
Adrian Tekliński	Men's scratch	—	19
Wojciech Pszczolarski	Men's points race	-19 points	14
Grzegorz Drejgier; Rafal Sarnecki; Krzysztof Maksel	Men's team sprint	43.751	8

=== Women ===
Name	Event	Result	Rank
Małgorzata Wojtyra	Women's individual pursuit	03:34.519 (q), 03:41.904 (f)	2
Natalia Rutkowska	Women's scratch	—	13
Katarzyna Pawłowska	Women's points race	15 points	1
Katarzyna Pawłowska; Eugenia Bujak; Edyta Jasińska; Natalia Rutkowska	Women's team pursuit	04:29.239 (q), 04:27.165 (f)	7

== See also ==
- Australia at the UCI Track Cycling World Championships
- Cuba at the UCI Track Cycling World Championships
- Netherlands at the UCI Track Cycling World Championships
