= Colombia at the 1976 Summer Olympics =

- IOC code: COL
- NOC: Colombian Olympic Committee

in Montreal
- Competitors: 35 (32 men and 3 women) in 7 sports
- Flag bearer: Helmut Bellingrodt
- Medals: Gold 0 Silver 0 Bronze 0 Total 0

Summer Olympics appearances (overview)
- 1932; 1936; 1948; 1952; 1956; 1960; 1964; 1968; 1972; 1976; 1980; 1984; 1988; 1992; 1996; 2000; 2004; 2008; 2012; 2016; 2020; 2024; 2028

Colombia competed at the 1976 Summer Olympics in Montreal, Quebec, Canada. It was the nation's ninth appearance at the Olympics. 35 competitors, 32 men and 3 women, took part in 30 events in 7 sports.

== Athletics ==
Men's 5000 metres

- Tibaduiza Reyes
  - Heat – 13:49.49 (→ did not advance)

Men's 10,000 metres

- Víctor Mora
  - Heat – 30:26.57 (→ did not advance)
- Tibaduiza Reyes
  - Heat – 29:28.17 (→ did not advance)

Men's 400 m hurdles

- Jesus Villegas Candelo
  - Heat – did not finish (→ did not advance)

Men's marathon

- Jairo Cubillog Rauirez – 2:29:04 (→ 48th place)
- Rafael Mora Zamora – did not finish (→ no ranking)

Men's 20 km walk

- Ernesto Alfaro Bermudez – 1:33:13 (→ 19th place)
- Rafael Vega Hernández – 1:37:27 (→ 31st place)

== Boxing ==
Men's Flyweight (– 51 kg)

- Virgilio Palomo
  - First Round – Bye
  - Second Round – Lost to Toshinori Koga (JPN), 0:5

Men's Light welterweight (– 63.5 kg)

- Luis Godoy
  - First Round - Lost to Christian Sittler (AUT), 1:4

== Cycling ==
Eleven cyclists represented Colombia in 1976.

Individual road race

- Álvaro Pachón – 4:49:01 (→ 22nd place)
- Luis Manrique – 4:49:01 (→ 23rd place)
- Miguel Samacá – did not finish (→ no ranking)
- Abelardo Ríos – did not finish (→ no ranking)

Team time trial

- Cristóbal Pérez
- Álvaro Pachón
- Luis Manrique
- Julio Rubiano

Sprint

- Julio Echevarry – 11th place

Individual pursuit

- José Jaime Galeano – 26th place

Team pursuit

- José Jaime Galeano
- Jorge Hernández
- Carlos Mesa
- Jhon Quiceno

== See also ==
- Sports in Colombia
