= 1973 UCI Track Cycling World Championships =

- Venue: San Sebastián, Spain
- Date: 22–28 August 1973
- Velodrome: Velódromo de Anoeta
- Events: 11

The 1973 UCI Track Cycling World Championships were the World Championship for track cycling. They took place in San Sebastián, Spain from 22 to 28 August 1973. Eleven events were contested, 9 for men (3 for professionals, 6 for amateurs) and 2 for women.

In the same period, the 1973 UCI Road World Championships were organized in Barcelona.

== Medal summary ==
Event	Gold	Silver	Bronze
Men's Professional Events
Men's sprint	Robert Van Lancker; Belgium	Giordano Turrini; Italy	Ezio Cardi; Italy
Men's individual pursuit	Hugh Porter; Great Britain	René Pijnen; Netherlands	Ferdinand Bracke; Belgium
Men's motor-paced	Cees Stam; Netherlands	Piet de Wit; Netherlands	Christian Raymond; France
Men's Amateur Events
Men's 1 km time trial	Janusz Kierzkowski; Poland	Eduard Rapp; Soviet Union	Herman Ponsteen; Netherlands
Men's sprint	Daniel Morelon; France	Anatoly Lablunowski; Soviet Union	Giorgio Rossi; Italy
Men's individual pursuit	Knut Knudsen; Norway	Herman Ponsteen; Netherlands	Rupert Kratzer; West Germany
Men's team pursuit	West Germany; Günther Schumacher; Peter Vonhof; Hans Lutz; Günter Haritz	Great Britain; Michael Bennett; Rik Evans; Ian Hallam; William Moore	Netherlands; Gerrie Fens; Peter Nieuwenhuis; Herman Ponsteen; Roy Schuiten
Men's motor-paced	Horst Gnas; West Germany	Rainer Podlesch; West Germany	Gaby Minneboo; Netherlands
Men's tandem	Czechoslovakia; Vladimír Vačkář; Miloslav Vymazal	Soviet Union; Viktor Kopylov; Vladimir Semenets	East Germany; Hans-Jürgen Geschke; Werner Otto
Women's Events
Women's sprint	Sheila Young; United States	Iva Zajíčková; Czechoslovakia	Galina Ermolaeva; Soviet Union
Women's individual pursuit	Tamara Garkuchina; Soviet Union	Keetie Hage; Netherlands	Beryl Burton; Great Britain

== Medal table ==
Rank	Nation	Gold	Silver	Bronze	Total
1	West Germany (FRG)	2	1	1	4
2	Netherlands (NED)	1	4	3	8
3	Soviet Union (URS)	1	3	1	5
4	Great Britain (GBR)	1	1	1	3
5	Czechoslovakia (TCH)	1	1	0	2
6	Belgium (BEL)	1	0	1	2
6	France (FRA)	1	0	1	2
8	Norway (NOR)	1	0	0	1
8	Poland (POL)	1	0	0	1
8	United States (USA)	1	0	0	1
11	Italy (ITA)	0	1	2	3
12	East Germany (GDR)	0	0	1	1
Totals (12 entries)		11	11	11	33

== See also ==
- 1973 UCI Road World Championships
