= Gordon Singleton =

Canadian and world champion track cyclist (1956–2024)

Gordon Singleton CM
Personal information
- Full name: Geoffrey Gordon Singleton
- Born: August 9, 1956 Niagara Falls, Ontario, Canada
- Died: March 23, 2024 (aged 67)

Cycling career
- Sport: Cycling
- Discipline: Sprint
- Role: Racer

Major wins
- First Canadian to win a World Cycling Championship 1982; Oct 1980 – Broke world records in the 200m, 500m & 1000m time trials in Mexico City
Medal record
Commonwealth Games 1978, Gold in Tandem sprint and Bronze in 1000m TT
Pan Am Games 1979, Men's Sprint (Gold), 1000m time trial (Gold)
UCI World Championships: Gold in 1982; silver medals 1979, 1981, 1982

Gordon Singleton CM (August 9, 1956 – March 23, 2024) was a Canadian world-record holding track cyclist. In 1982, he became the first Canadian cyclist to win a world championship. He was the first, and only, cyclist in history to simultaneously hold world records in all three of track cycling's sprint races: the 200m, 500m and 1000m distances, all in a 24-hour span from October 9–10 in 1980. An Olympic racer, he was deprived of competing in the 1980 Summer Olympics at the peak of his career by Canada's boycott of those games in Moscow. He also competed and won gold medals in the 1978 Edmonton Commonwealth Games, and the 1979 Puerto Rico Pan Am Games for Canada. At the end of 1986, he was named a Companion of the Order of Canada. In his middle-age, he continued to cycle and took part in Master Series races, getting a bronze medal at the Canadian Nationals for his age group in 2014. He was inducted into the Canadian Cycling Hall of Fame in October 2015 along with some of his teammates from the 1970s and 1980s. His hometown of Niagara Falls, Ontario celebrated him many times over his life, including in 2004, as their best athlete in its first 100 years. After his cycling career was over, he took over his father's automotive parts business in Niagara Falls. In 2023, he was diagnosed with Cancer, and died from the disease in March 2024.

== Early career ==
Geoffrey Gordon Singleton, was born on August 9, 1956, in Niagara Falls, Ontario to William (Bill) and Betty Singleton. His father William was a businessman and owned Niagara Tire and Battery Ltd., an automobile parts store. At age 13, Gordon first came to public attention, in April 1970, when he was featured in an article about newspaper carriers for the local news outlet, The Niagara Falls Review. The article mentioned his sporting passions were playing baseball and ice hockey with no mention of cycling.

Destiny happened when he entered and won the local Blossom Festival Bike Race, an amateur cycling race held during the Victoria Day long weekend in May 1974. He was noticed by the St. Catharine's Cycling Club's president Colin Heath, who invited him to join the club and became Singleton's first cycling coach. Singleton's training method at the time was unusual, as he mentioned in a 1974 interview, that he just cycled to get to places because it was cheaper than driving a car.

His first track race was the Ontario Junior sprint championship, in early July 1974, held in Woodbridge, Ontario. He beat Toronto's Gino Greco to win first place. Two weeks later, he competed in the Canadian Junior Nationals, held in Winnipeg, where he came second to Greco.

== First Canadian Title ==
The following year, Singleton, sold his automobile and used the money to fund his trip to the United Kingdom. He met his eventual coach and mentor, Eddie Soens, on that trip.

1975 was his first year racing on the elite circuit, after spending a single season in the juniors. On July 19, Singleton won the 1975 Canadian men's sprint championship at Calgary's Glenmore Velodrome when he beat Montreal's Andre Simard 2–0 in the best of three event. To win the second race, Singleton used an unusual tactic when he was in the lead at the beginning of the second lap, he just powered his way over Simard to win the race in 11.9 seconds. It would be the first of his 11 track cycling national titles that he won at the Canadian Cycling Championships.

Later that year, he represented Canada at his first UCI Track Cycling World Championship in Rocourt, Belgium. Although he did not finish in a medal position, Singleton, along with future Hall of Fame cyclist Jocelyn Lovell, led a Canadian surge onto the cycling stage in the 1970s and 1980s.

Singleton represented Canada at the 1975 Pan American Games in Mexico. While training in Mexico City, in early October, he was involved in a bike-automobile collision and was injured. The collision separated his shoulder. He was able to sufficiently recover to take part in some races but did not win a medal.

== 1976 Olympics ==
At age 19, Singleton represented Canada at the 1976 Olympic Games in Montreal. He did not reach the medal round. However, he became the first Canadian to reach the second round in the 1000-metre sprint. In the preliminary heat, he defeated Bulgarian rider, Dimo Angelou, to advance to the top 16.

The following month, he and team Ontario won more medals at the 1976 Canadian Track Cycling Championships held at Montreal's Olympic Velodrome. Singleton took on Jocelyn Lovell in the best of three sprint final. Lovell was favoured and won the first race. But, Singleton won the second race forcing the unexpected third race. The third race ended in a tie as Lovell made a tactical mistake. In the tie-breaker forth race, Lovell won, but the young challenger Singleton proved much with his silver medal finish. The Ontario pursuit team, anchored by both Lovell and Singleton, took the gold medal for the second year in a row.

== 1978 Commonwealth Games ==
He would continue to rise in the international rankings, and would again represent Canada in 1978, this time at the Commonwealth Games held in Edmonton. Track cycling was staged outdoors at the Argyll Velodrome.

The first event he entered was the 1000-metre time trial. There were 36 racers and he drew an early seed. Veteran racers Lovell, David Weller from Jamaica, and Trevor Gadd from England were given the last three seeds.

There were two surprise breakout performances at this event from Singleton and Kenrick Tucker from Australia. Both were junior members of their respective teams. Tucker was the fourth seed and posted a new games record time of 1:06.96 that was the fastest for the next two hours. Singleton posted a time of 1:07.56 that was good enough for second at that point. Then, the final racer, Jocelyn Lovell, came on the track after a 30-minute weather delay because of lightening storms near the velodrome. Lovell posted a new Commonwealth record time of 1:06.00 and won the gold medal in the event. Singleton had to settle for the bronze medal. His bronze performance was the first time he won a medal in an international competition.

Singleton followed up his bronze performance by teaming up with Lovell in the Tandem Sprint. The pair took home the gold on August 10 against the English team of Gadd and Dave Le Grys. The English team crashed on the track during the finals and could not continue, giving the Canadians the gold by default.

== 1979 The breakthrough year ==
=== 1979 Pan-American Games ===
San Juan, Puerto Rico was the main host city for the 1979 Pan American Games, but the track cycling events took place about 100 kilometres south, at a velodrome in Coamo. The Coamo velodrome was an outdoor concrete track that didn't have lights. The lack of artificial lighting forced all races to be held in the middle of the day, in the full heat and humidity of the Caribbean summer weather. Donald Sutherland, the technical director for the Canadian Cycling Association, thought the track was poorly designed. It was slow because it was extremely bumpy and due to the weather conditions.

On July 4, the 1000 metre track time trial race was held. The favourite was David Weller from Jamaica, who placed second in the same event at the 1975 games in Mexico City. There were twelve cyclists competing in the time trial event, with only one cyclist on the track at a time. Singleton started eighth and posted a time of 1:07.30. Weller was more than a full second back and placed second with a time of 1:08.67. Richard Torman, representing Chile, placed third with a time of 1:08.83. Canadian Team manager George Trattner emphasized that Singleton's 1.35 second margin of victory was unusually large, when normally first to fourth place is decided by hundredths of a second. It was Canada's fifth gold of the games, and Singleton's first ever Pan-Am gold medal.

Singleton competed next in the scratch sprint track event on July 7. In the finals, he beat Cuban racer Juan Perez. Dagoberto Pino also from Cuba received the bronze medal.

When Singleton came back from the games, his flight landed at Buffalo Niagara International Airport. He was met by Buffalo Police officers and they gave him an escort to the border, where he was met by Niagara Regional Police and whisked to Niagara Square to be greeted by over 500 admirers. The mayor of Niagara Falls, Wayne Thomson presented him with a medallion and a visibly exhausted Singleton was both surprised and grateful for the reception.

=== 1979 Canadian Track Cycling Championships ===
The 1979 Canadian Track Cycling Championships were held during the final week of July at the Montreal Velodrome. Singleton competed again in the 1000-metre time trial on July 24. He was experimenting with a higher gear ratio, which made his time slower than at Coamo, with a winning time of 1:08.46. Quebec's Claude Langlois was almost a full second behind at 1:09:44 for the silver medal. Peter Suderman, from British Columbia, got the bronze with a time of 1:11.33.

Singleton was a member of Ontario's four-man 4000-metre Senior Pursuit Team. Other team members included Hugh Walton from Toronto; Steve Bauer from Fenwick; and Barry Trevisiol from Sudbury. During the semi-finals, on July 26, they beat the Quebec team with a new Ontario record time of 4:37.89. On July 27, the Ontario team beat the British Columbia team for the gold medal.

On July 27, Singleton easily won the Senior track sprint event. He beat Quebec's Gino Greco by three lengths. With his three cycling gold medals, he was awarded a fourth one, the Omnium (over-all) track championship medal.

=== 1979 World Championships ===
The 1979 UCI Track Cycling World Championships were held in Amsterdam, Netherlands. On the opening day, August 28, the first and only championship race was the 1000-metre time trial. Singleton had a strong race and finished second to defending world champion, Lothar Thoms of East Germany. Both Singleton and Thoms had identical 38.88-second splits at the 500-metre mark. But Thoms covered the final 500 metres in a time of 32.78 seconds for a final time of 1:06.61. Singleton finished with a time of 1:07.53. Soviet Union cyclist Edouard Rapp finished third with a time of 1:07.78. This was Singleton's first world championship medal.

On August 29, Singleton was disqualified after winning the second repechage heat in the men's sprint. He pushed Czech cyclist Ivan Kucirek, during the race as they approached the finish line. Jock Wadley, writing in The Daily Telegraph, stated the race conditions were curious in that for Singleton's first heat, the start gun was fired four times. Also, at another point Singleton fell because of dew forming on the paint of an advertisement on the track surface. The race was paused as the track was dried. Finally, after the race was restarted for a third time, Singleton got a flat tire.

Singleton called the disqualification "political" when interviewed in the Niagara Falls Review a few weeks after the championships. In particular, he thought he had right-of-way and that there were several bumps along the way but he had regained his balance. However, the final corner was judged by someone from Czechoslovakia, and Singleton alleged that this was the judge that disqualified him.

=== 1979 Athlete of the Year Nominations ===
With 1979 being Singleton's big breakout year, he was nominated for several best athlete of the year awards. He was runner-up to skier Ken Read for the 1979 Sports Federation of Canada amateur athlete awards. He also received his first nomination for the Lionel Conacher Award as Canada's top male athlete of the year. He was nominated that year for the Lou Marsh Award as Canada's best athlete, losing out to Jacques Villeneuve. He won best athlete of the year honours for the province of Ontario.

== 1980 World Records ==
In 1980, at the height of his career, Singleton was the second-ranked sprint cyclist in the world, and one of the favourites for the gold medals at that year's summer Olympics. However, when the Canadians joined the American-led boycott of the Moscow Olympics, due to the Soviet invasion of Afghanistan, Singleton was deprived of competing in his second Olympics.

In lieu of the Olympics, the Canadian Government set up an opportunity with additional funding for 20 of its top summer athletes to compete in an alternative competition. For Singleton and cycling there were no more big events that season. After discussions with his coach, Eddie Soens of Liverpool, it was decided to attack all three world records at the sprint distances. During a single 24-hour period, Singleton set new world records in three separate events: the 200, 500 and 1000 metres. He was the first, and remains the only, cyclist in history to simultaneously hold records in these three distances, For the second year in a row, he was nominated for the Lou Marsh Award as Canada's best athlete. He lost out to long-distance runner and cancer fundraiser Terry Fox.

=== 1981 World track championships ===
The 1981 World Championships took place in Brno, Czechoslovakia. Singleton would finish fourth in the second ever Keirin championship, which was won by Danny Clark of Australia. Next, Singleton would take the silver medal in the 200 metres, behind five-time world champion Koichi Nakano of Japan.

== 1982 UCI World Champion ==
The 1982 UCI World Track Championships were held at the Saffron Lane velodrome in Leicester, United Kingdom in late August. It was Singleton's last year on the elite circuit. On August 27, in the Keirin event, he defeated Australian Danny Clark – the two-time champion – to win the gold medal. With the victory, he became the first Canadian in history to win a World Championship in cycling.

In his final race, on August 28, he faced off against Japanese racer Koichi Nakano for the last time in the match sprint event. Singleton collided with Nakano, and fell, breaking his collarbone. Singleton could not continue and had to settle for the silver medal. The collision was controversial, as it was unclear who initiated the contact, although Singleton always maintained that it was Nakano who collided with him. It was the second collision between the two riders during the competition.

Also that year, he would win first place at the Grand Prix in London, England, setting British records for flying 200 metre & 500 metre events. He was nominated again for the 1982 Lou Marsh Award as Canada's best athlete.

== World Masters career ==
Singleton would re-enter competitive cycling in the 1990s. He was triumphant in his return to the World Masters event in 1998, where he was a double Gold Medal winner, in the sprint and 750 metre time trial (40–45 year category). In 2006, Singleton would repeat in the sprint category, this time in the 50- to 55-year-old category, taking home the Gold. Later, in 2014, at the Canadian Track Championships he won a bronze medal in the Masters "C" Category sprint title.

== Awards and honours ==
Post-career, Singleton was honoured many times during his remaining lifetime. The Governor General of Canada appointed him to be a Member of the Order of Canada (CM) in 1986, and invested him into the order in 1987. In 1990, his hometown inducted him into the Niagara Falls Sports Wall of Fame.

His American practice venue made him a 1996 inductee into their Valley Preferred Cycling Center Hall of Fame, in Allentown, Pennsylvania. It was at this facility, on August 1, 1980, that he broke three of the facility's track records in one night as preparation for the World Record attempts in Mexico City, later that year.

During Niagara Falls' 100th anniversary celebrations, they gave tribute to Singleton on December 11, 2004, when he was awarded the Niagara Falls Review Athlete of the Centennial. He was honoured again by his hometown, when he represented the City of Niagara Falls during the 2010 Olympic Torch run for the Vancouver Winter Olympics.

Along with some of his teammates from the 1970s and early 1980s, he was part of the inaugural class of the Canadian Cycling Hall of Fame. He was inducted into the Hall on October 10, 2015, with the ceremony held at the Mattamy National Cycling Centre in Milton, Ontario.

== Personal life and death ==
Singleton married Louann Godak in 1981, and the couple had two sons: Chris and Jamie, who both went on to win national championships in their respective sports soccer and football: Chris — CISSA National Championship soccer, Ridley College 2003; and Jamie, McMaster University won the Vanier Cup in Vancouver 2011.

In 2023, he was diagnosed with prostate cancer, and lost his battle with the disease on March 23, 2024, at the age of 67.
