= Uruguay at the 1976 Summer Olympics =

- IOC code: URU
- NOC: Uruguayan Olympic Committee

in Montreal
- Competitors: 9 (7 men, 2 women) in 5 sports
- Medals: Gold 0 Silver 0 Bronze 0 Total 0

Summer Olympics appearances (overview)
- 1924; 1928; 1932; 1936; 1948; 1952; 1956; 1960; 1964; 1968; 1972; 1976; 1980; 1984; 1988; 1992; 1996; 2000; 2004; 2008; 2012; 2016; 2020; 2024

Uruguay competed at the 1976 Summer Olympics in Montreal, Quebec, Canada. Nine competitors, seven men and two women, took part in nine events in five sports.

== Athletics ==
- Ana María Desevici

== Boxing ==
- Juan Scassino

== Cycling ==
Five cyclists represented Uruguay in 1976.

Individual road race

- Carlos Alcantara – did not finish (→ no ranking)
- Víctor González – did not finish (→ no ranking)
- Waldemar Pedrazzi – did not finish (→ no ranking)
- Washington Díaz – did not finish (→ no ranking)

1000m time trial

- Miguel Margalef – 1:11.905 (→ 22nd place)

Individual pursuit

- Washington Díaz – 21st place

Team pursuit

- Washington Díaz
- Víctor González
- Miguel Margalef
- Waldemar Pedrazzi

== Rowing ==
- Reinaldo Kutscher

== Swimming ==
- Elena Ospitaleche
