= Jocelyn Lovell =

International champion cyclist and spinal injury recovery advocate (1950–2016)

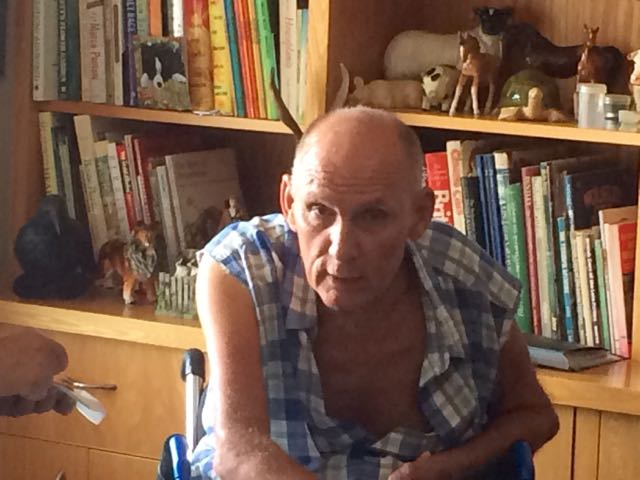
- Lovell at his home in Mississauga, Ontario in September 2015

Personal information
- Born: 19 July 1950 Norwich, Norfolk, England
- Died: 3 June 2016 (aged 65) Toronto, Ontario, Canada
- Height: 1.78 m (5 ft 10 in)
- Weight: 71 kg (157 lb)

Cycling career
- Sport: Cycling
- Disciplines: Road and Track cycling
- Role: Rider
- Rider type: All-rounder

Amateur team
- 1968–1983: Team Canada

Major wins
- Silver Medal,1978 UCI Track Championship, Gold Medals, 1978 Commonwealth Games, Gold Medal, 1975 Pan American Games, 5 Gold Medals, 1974 CAN. Championships, Gold Medal, 1971 Pan American Games, Gold Medal, 1970 Commonwealth Games

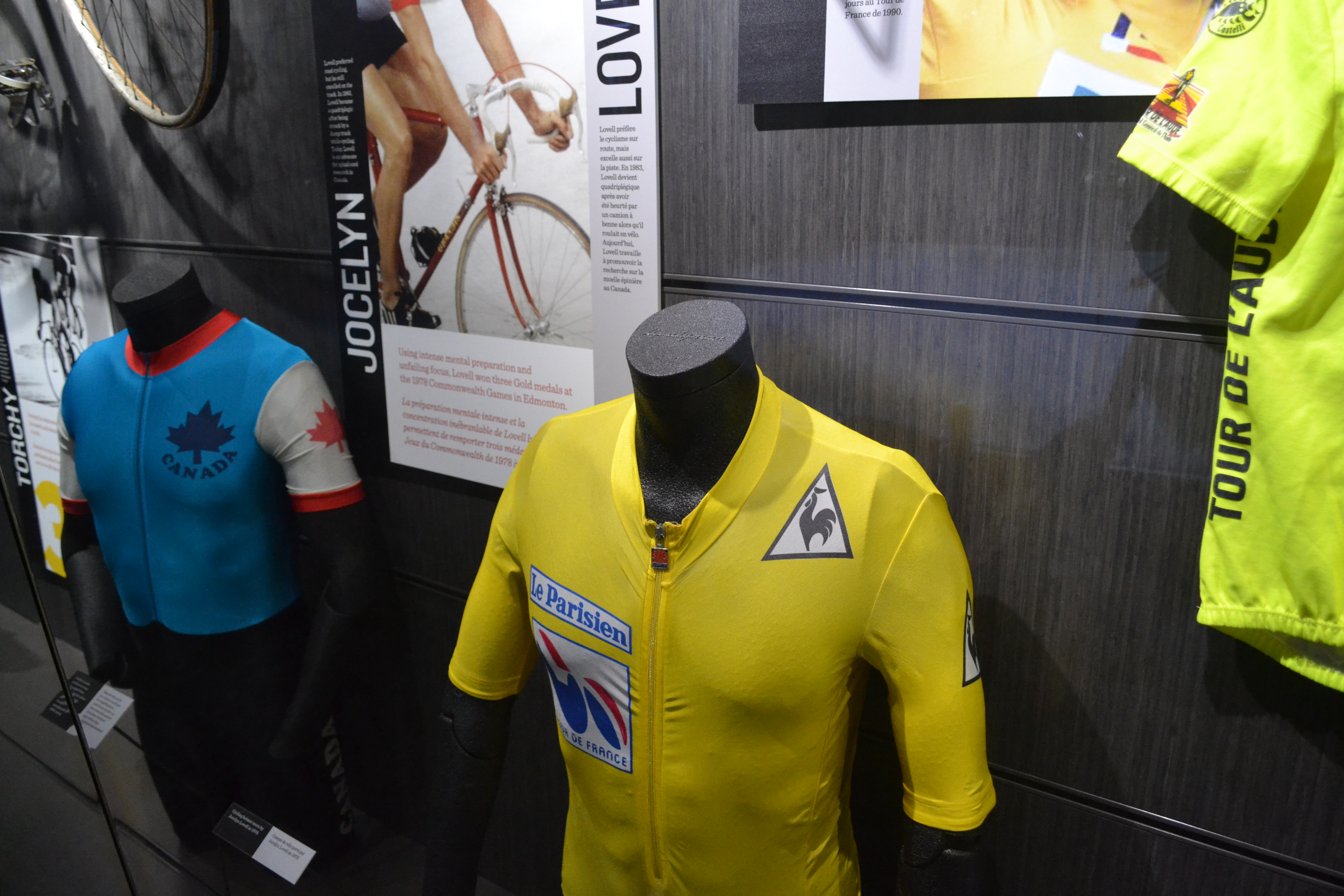
Jocelyn Lovell display at Canada's Sports Hall of Fame

Jocelyn Charles Bjorn Lovell (19 July 1950 – 3 June 2016) was a Canadian and World cycling champion. He won dozens of Canadian national titles for track and road cycling in the 1970s and early 1980s, as well as gold medals at the Commonwealth Games and Pan American Games. He competed at three Olympic Games. His victories, at international competitions, renewed global interest in Canadian cycling.

In 1973 he was suspended from Team Canada during “the cookie incident.” His suspension caused him to miss the 1974 Commonwealth Games in New Zealand. He moved to Europe, for about six months, becoming the first Canadian to regularly compete for a European trade team. He returned to Canada in July 1974 where he won five gold medals at the Canadian men's national cycling championships in track and long-distance cycling.

At the 1978 Commonwealth Games in Edmonton, he won three gold medals in Games record times. Later that year he won a silver medal at the world championships. He continued to race as an amateur into the early 1980s.

While out on training ride in August 1983, he was hit by a dump truck that turned him into a quadriplegic. By 1985, he was sufficiently well enough that he focused his energies on activism for a cure for spinal injuries through his foundation. He was inducted into Canada's Sports Hall of Fame in 1985 and the Canadian Cycling Hall of Fame in 2015.

== Early life and career ==
Jocelyn Charles Bjorn Lovell was born in Norwich, England, on 19 July 1950. His parents were Margit (née Petersen) and Anthony Lovell. The family moved to Canada when he was five, living in Saskatchewan, where his father was a schoolteacher, before settling in Toronto.

== 1973–74 suspension, to Europe and back ==
=== The cookie incident ===
During July 1973, the Canadian team competed and trained in Spain and France. Living daily in close quarters for over three weeks only made tensions within the team more intense. Lovell was a free-spirit and that caused him to have a combative relationship with some of the team's coaches and administrators. He also had a tense relationship with some of his teammates.

The suppressed tensions between the team and Lovell finally surfaced into the open during what became known as the "Cookie Incident." It turned out that his hotel room key also opened a supply room door on his floor. He raided the pantry and took a box of cookies. He shared the cookies with his teammates, but one of them objected to his behaviour. The team captain reported him to team officials. The officials used this incident, and a scuffle with a teammate – that happened around this time – to force him to go back to Canada before the rest of the team. The coaching staff then started disciplinary proceedings against him through the sport's oversight body, the Canadian Cycling Association (CCA), partially to retaliate against him for his insubordination.

After many months of CCA committee deliberations, the president of the CCA, Guy Morin, on 20 November 1973, informed Lovell that he was suspended from the national team for six months. Some of the coaches wanted a lifetime ban, but the review committee did not agree. The decision meant he would not be part of Team Canada at the Commonwealth Games in New Zealand in January 1974. Not only did it deny Lovell from defending his Commonwealth titles, but Team Canada would not win a medal in men's cycling at those games.

The suspension made Lovell actually consider becoming a professional racer in Europe. He did travel to Amsterdam in late January 1974 and trained as an amateur, preparing to join a professional club. Lovell became the first Canadian ever to ride regularly for an amateur European trade team (Hebro Flandria). He won some races in Europe, but got turned off of becoming a professional because of the small amount of money involved and the drug-doping that the pros were doing. When the ban was up, he returned to Canada in July, and maintained his amateur status to compete at the 1974 UCI Track Cycling World Championships in August, held in Montreal.

=== 1974 Canadian Championships ===
Lovell came back from Europe to compete at the Canadian senior cycling championships at Vancouver's China Creek Velodrome during the final weekend of July. He felt he had something to prove to CCA officials after his six-month suspension. In attendance that weekend were CCA's executive director Ken Smith and newly hired national men's team head coach, Don Sutherland.

On the first day of competition, Lovell took the men's 1000-metre time trial with a winning time of 1:11.01. He also was the class of the 1000-metre sprint preliminaries, winning his heat easily.

On Sunday, 28 July, Lovell won the 1,000-metre sprint and the 4000-metre individual pursuit to become the overall national individual champion for the fourth time in five years. In the men's 4000-metre pursuit, Lovell posted a best time of 5:11.02, while Roy Fondse of Winnipeg placed second and Brian Keast of Vancouver was third. In the 1000-metre sprints, Lovell covered the last 200 metres in 12.37 seconds beating second place finisher Ed McRae of Vancouver and third place finisher André Simard of Quebec City. The wins in the 1000-metre time trial and the individual pursuit qualified Lovell to be on Team Canada in those events for the UCI world championships in Montreal the next month.

The Canadian championships continued in Pitt Meadows, British Columbia on Thursday, 1 August, with Lovell leading the Ontario A team to victory in the 100-kilometre team time trial event with a time of 2:17:08.50, almost two minutes faster than the two Quebec teams that finished in second and third place.

The men's 105-mile (169-kilometre) road race took place on Sunday, using a 12-kilometre circuit through Burnaby. Lovell completed the 14 laps in five hours, six minutes, 18.5 seconds (5:06:18.50). He was a length ahead of Calgary's Hank Konig who placed second, while third went to Gilles Durand of Quebec. Lovell held back from the initial leaders, then, with a pack, made a move to the front on the ninth lap. Konig was in the lead during the final lap until he had mechanical difficulties. That's when Lovell made his move and sprinted past him near the finish line to win. This victory gave Lovell his fifth gold medal, and a sweep of all the individual events, at the 1974 Canadian Senior Cycling championships.

=== 1974 UCI World Championships ===
The 75th UCI World Cycling Championships were held at the University of Montreal from 14–25 August 1974. This was the first time the event was held outside of Europe. Originally, the championships were supposed to be held at the new Olympic Velodrome, but like most construction involved with the Montreal Olympics, the building was way behind schedule. A temporary outdoor velodrome was constructed using the wood track intended for the Olympic velodrome, on the Stade CEPSUM playing field and certified by UCI officials in late July.

Unfortunately for Canada, the team did not do well at the world championships. Lovell was ousted early in the individual pursuit. He was on tap after the championship's official opening ceremonies that evening in the 1,000-metre time trial event. At 1:10.11, he finished 13th, well back of the Soviet Union's Eduard Rapp's time of 1:07.61, that gave the Russian cyclist the first gold medal of the championships. Lovell was Canada's best hope for a medal but it was not to be, and the host country did not win any medals at the championships.

== 1976 Olympics ==
During July 1976, Lovell represented Canada at the 1976 Olympic Games in Montreal. Track events were staged at the new indoor Olympic Velodrome. Originally, he was only going to compete in his speciality, the 1000-metre time trial. On 20 July, he placed thirteenth, but he was not surprised by his poor showing. He was amazed at Klaus-Jürgen Grünke's winning time of 1:05.927, which was almost three-full seconds faster than Lovell's 1:08:852 time.

Unexpectedly, Lovell would ride in another event. There was much drama with Team Canada's four-man 4000-metre pursuit team. Two Quebec members quit at the games: Robert Pelltier and André Simard. Lovell replaced Simard. The team then consisted of Lovell, Hugh Walton of Toronto, Adrian Proser of Hamilton and Ron Hayman of Vancouver. Bad luck followed as Proser had a tire blowout and he crashed during the qualifying round. The crash disqualified Canada, and with it, Lovell's chance at a medal.

== 1976 Canadian Track Cycling Championships ==
The following month, he and team Ontario won more medals at the 1976 Canadian Track Cycling Championships held at Montreal's Olympic Velodrome. Gordon Singleton, from Niagara Falls took on Lovell in the best of three sprint final. Lovell was favoured and won the first race. But, Singleton won the second race forcing the unexpected third race. The third race ended in a tie as Lovell made a tactical mistake. In the tie-breaker forth race, Lovell won, but the young challenger Singleton proved much with his silver medal finish. The Ontario pursuit team, anchored by both Lovell and Singleton, took the gold medal for the second year in a row.

== 1978 Commonwealth Games ==
Lovell would again represent Canada in 1978, this time at the Commonwealth Games held in Edmonton. Track cycling was staged outdoors at the Argyll Velodrome.

=== 1000-metre Time Trial ===
The first event he entered was the 1000-metre time trial on 4 August, which was the first day of competition at the games. There were 36 racers and as one of the Commonwealth's best track racers he drew the last seed. Other veteran racers David Weller from Jamaica, and Trevor Gadd from England were given the remaining late seeds.

There were two surprise breakout performances at this event from newer racers: Gordon Singleton from Canada and Kenrick Tucker from Australia. Both were junior members of their respective teams. Tucker was the fourth seed and posted a new games record time of 1:06.96 that was the fastest for the next two hours. Singleton posted a time of 1:07.56 that was good enough for second at that point. Then, the final racer, Lovell, came on the track after a 30-minute weather delay because of lightning storms near the velodrome. Lovell posted a new Commonwealth record time of 1:06.00 and won the gold medal in the event. Singleton had to settle for the bronze medal.

=== Tandem Sprint ===
Lovell followed up his gold performance by teaming up with Singleton in the Tandem Sprint. The pair took home the gold on 10 August against the English team of Gadd and Dave Le Grys. The English team crashed on the track during the finals and could not continue, giving the Canadians the gold by default.

=== 10-Mile Scratch Race ===
Later that day, Lovell again competed in the games final track event, the 10-mile (15 km) scratch race. Lovell stayed in the pack, behind the leaders until the final three laps. He began his move to catch the leaders by breaking away from the pack and catching up to the leaders. He took the lead in the final two laps and won his third gold medal of the games.

== 1978 UCI Track Cycling World Championships ==
Just over a week after the Commonwealth Games, on 17 August, Lovell was in Munich, West Germany, to participate in the 1978 UCI Track Cycling World Championships. He raced in the 1000-metre time trial event, posting a time of 1:06.28. That was the leading time until the final seed. The last rider was East Germany's Lothar Thoms, and his time of 1:05.23 was over a second better than Lovell's time. Thoms took home the gold medal and Lovell got his first silver medal at a world championship.

== Use of Marinoni Bicycles ==
In the 1970s, Montrealer Guiseppe Marinoni, made some of the best track bicycles in Canada. Lovell used these bicycles through much of his middle and later career. One bicycle in particular held a special relationship between both men: the 1978 Marinoni bicycle used by Lovell to win the Canadian championships and the silver at the UCI championships that year. Marinoni remembered, “dropping it off at noon, and by 4:00 p.m. Lovell was a champion.”

Once Lovell started focusing more on road racing in the early 1980s, as a sign of gratitude, he gave the bicycle back to Marinoni. Marinoni used this bike, at the Mattamy National Cycling Centre velodrome, to attempt breaking the one-hour record for his age group in 2017.

In the documentary film Marinoni: The Fire in the Frame, Marinoni is shown reuniting with Lovell, now in a wheelchair at the latter's home in Port Credit, Ontario, in 2012. At this reunion, Lovell gave Marinoni his five gold medals from the 1974 Canadian Cycling Championships.

== Crash and Spinal-cord activism ==
On 4 August 1983, Lovell was hit by a dump truck while training in Halton Region, just northwest of Toronto. The driver collided with him from behind, breaking Lovell's neck and pelvis. From that moment on, he permanently became a quadriplegic. No charges were laid.

After the crash that turned Lovell into a quadriplegic he spent over a year recuperating and learning how to get around in a wheelchair. By 1985, he was sufficiently well enough that he focused his energies on activism for a cure for spinal injuries.

He started and presided over the Jocelyn Lovell Foundation to help fund research into repairing spinal-cords. Much of the foundation's work in the 1980s was in conjunction with McMaster University, in Hamilton, Ontario. At the time, it was one of the few medical research schools in Canada working on regenerating nerve fibres and repairing spinal-cords.

== Personal life ==
Lovell was married to speed skater and competitive cyclist Sylvia Burka in 1981. They separated in 1986. He lived in Mississauga, Ontario with his second wife, Neil. He died in Toronto on Friday, 3 June 2016.

== Tributes and honours ==
When his career came to a sudden end, his cycling achievements were eventually recognized by various sports bodies in Canada. He was inducted into Canada's Sports Hall of Fame on 23 August 1985. He was in the inaugural class of inductees – that included his tandem partner, Gorden Singleton – for the Canadian Cycling Hall of Fame. Cycling Canada held the induction ceremony on 10 October 2015 at the Mattamy National Cycling Centre in Milton, Ontario.
