= Cesare Cipollini =

Italian cyclist (1958–2023)

Personal information
- Born: 16 December 1958 Belfort, France
- Died: 10 August 2023 (aged 64)

Cycling career
- Sport: Cycling

Cesare Cipollini (16 December 1958 – 10 August 2023) was an Italian cyclist. He competed in the team pursuit event at the 1976 Summer Olympics.

== Life and career ==
The brother of the cyclist Mario, when he was still a junior cyclist, Cipollini competed in the team pursuit event at the 1976 Summer Olympics; the Italian team, also consisting of Giuseppe Saronni, Sandro Callari, and Rino De Candido, finished in eighth place, but in an earlier stage set the world record (4'24"00). Turned professional in 1978 with Magniflex-Torpado, he won the 1983 Giro dell'Emilia. He participated in nine editions of the Giro d'Italia and one Vuelta a España. He retired in 1990.

A longtime heart patient, after having successfully undergone a heart transplant in 2009, Cipollini died on 10 August 2023, at the age of 64. His son Edoardo (born in 2005) is also a cyclist.
