= Dohnal =

Dohnal (feminine: Dohnalová) is a Czech surname, meaning '[he] caught up'. Notable people with the surname include:

- Darcie Dohnal (born 1972), American speed skater
- Johanna Dohnal (1939–2010), Austrian politician
- Zdeněk Dohnal (born 1945), Czech cyclist

== See also ==
- Milena Jesenská (1896–1944), writer and translator, possibly working under the pseudonym Jaroslav Dohnal
