= Brouzes =

Brouzes is a French surname. Notable people with the surname include:

- Jean-Marcel Brouzes (born 1953), French former cyclist
- Juste Brouzes (1894–1973), French international footballer
- Niels Brouzes (born 1981), French former professional road bicycle racer
