= James Byrne (sailor) =

Australian sailor

Personal information
- Nationality: Australian
- Born: 29 September 1948 (age 76)

Sport
- Sport: Sailing

James Byrne (born 29 September 1948) is an Australian sailor. He competed in the Tempest event along with helmsman Jörn Hellner at the 1976 Summer Olympics. Byrne and Hellner finished 10th overall, with their best single race being a fourth-place finish in race five.

Byrne won the inaugural 1980–1981 Victoria state championship in the Etchells class, and won again in 1985–1986.
