= Minie Brinkhoff =

Dutch cyclist (born 1952)

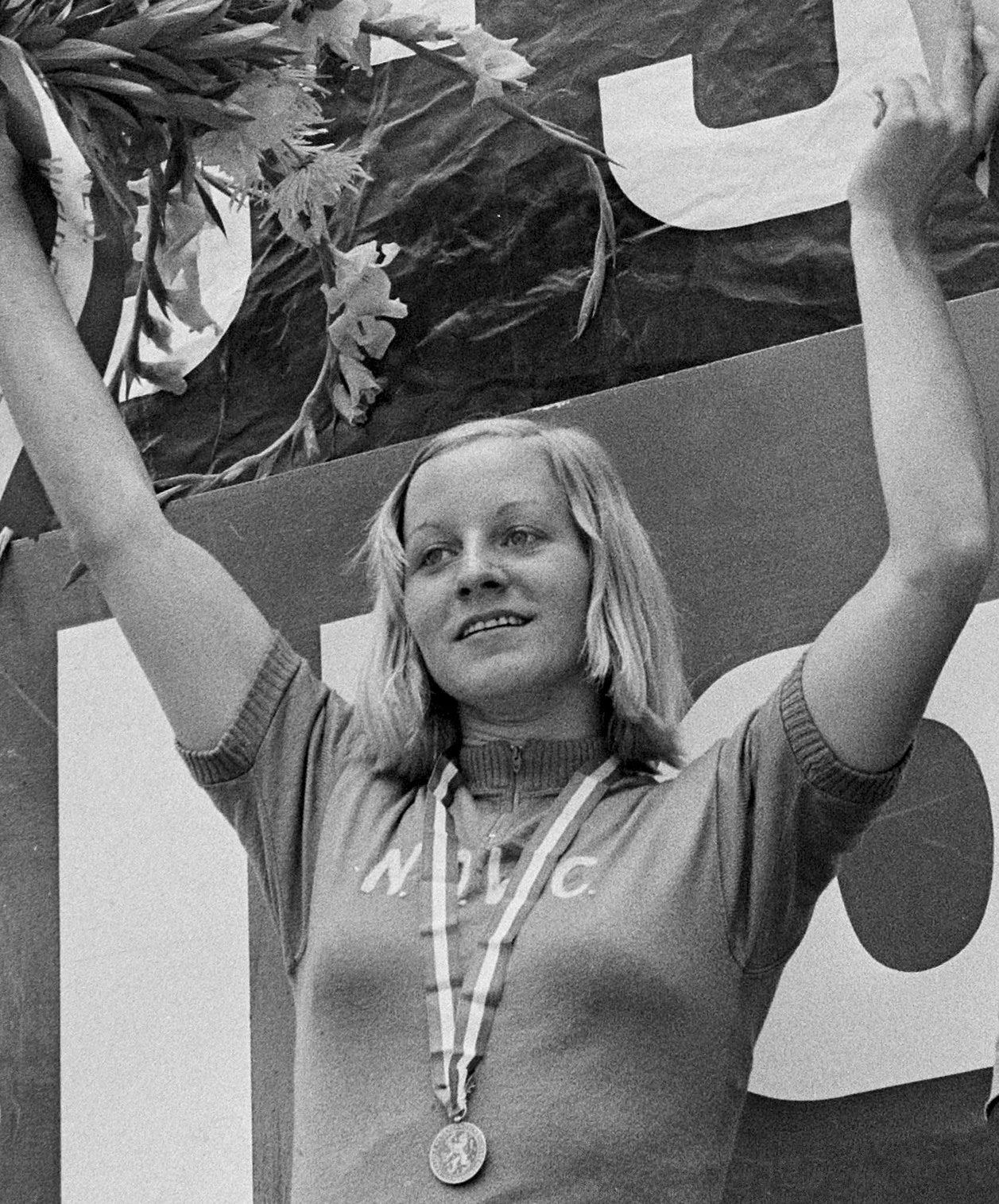
- Minie Brinkhoff in 1974

Personal information
- Born: 19 December 1952 (age 73) Zevenaar, the Netherlands

Sport
- Sport: Cycling
Medal record
Representing the Netherlands
UCI Road World Championships
| Bronze medal – third place | 1977 San Cristóbal | Road race |

Wilhelmina "Minie" Brinkhoff (born 19 December 1952) is a retired Dutch cyclist who was active between 1970 and 1978. She won a bronze medal in the road race at the 1977 UCI Road World Championships as well as two national track sprint titles, in 1972 and 1974. After marrying Dutch cyclist Peter Nieuwenhuis she changed her last name to Brinkhoff-Nieuwenhuis.
