= Geoff Skaines =

Australian cyclist (born 1953)

Personal information
- Born: 8 June 1953 (age 73)

Cycling career
- Sport: Cycling

Geoff Skaines (born 8 June 1953) is an Australian former cyclist. He competed in the team pursuit event at the 1976 Summer Olympics.
