= Robin Croker =

British cyclist (born 1954)

Personal information
- Born: 10 May 1954 (age 72) Melbourne, Australia

Cycling career
- Sport: Cycling
Medal record
Men's cycling
Representing Great Britain
Olympic Games
Bronze medal – third place	1976 Montreal	Team Pursuit

Robin Croker (born 10 May 1954) is a British cyclist born in Melbourne, Australia to British parents. He won a bronze medal riding for Great Britain in the team pursuit at the 1976 Montreal Games. Croker also rode for Australia in 1974 British Commonwealth Games (Road).
