= Sailing at the 1976 Summer Olympics – Tempest =

Sailing at the Olympics

Tempest at the Games of the XXI Olympiad
- Tempest
- Venue: Kingston
- Dates: 31 July to 8 August
- Competitors: 32 from 16 nations
- Teams: 16

Medalists
1st place, gold medalist(s)		John Albrechtson; Ingvar Hansson	Sweden
2nd place, silver medalist(s)		Valentin Mankin; Vladislav Akimenko	Soviet Union
3rd place, bronze medalist(s)		Dennis Conner; Conn Findlay	United States

The Tempest was a sailing event on the Sailing at the 1976 Summer Olympics program in Kingston, Ontario . Seven races were scheduled. 32 sailors, on 16 boats, from 16 nations competed.

== Results ==
Rank	Helmsman (Country)	Crew	Race I		Race II		Race III		Race IV		Race V		Race VI		Race VII		Total Points	Total -1
Rank	Helmsman (Country)	Crew	Rank	Points	Rank	Points	Rank	Points	Rank	Points	Rank	Points	Rank	Points	Rank	Points	Total Points	Total -1
1st place, gold medalist(s)	John Albrechtson (SWE)	Ingvar Hansson	4	8.0	1	0.0	2	3.0	1	0.0	~~7~~	~~13.0~~	2	3.0	1	0.0	27.0	14.0
2nd place, silver medalist(s)	Valentin Mankin (URS)	Vladislav Akimenko	1	0.0	4	8.0	4	8.0	3	5.7	2	3.0	3	5.7	~~5~~	~~10.0~~	40.4	30.4
3rd place, bronze medalist(s)	Dennis Conner (USA)	Conn Findlay	2	3.0	2	3.0	3	5.7	5	10.0	~~9~~	~~15.0~~	4	8.0	2	3.0	47.7	32.7
4	Uwe Mares (FRG)	Wolf Stadler	5	10.0	3	5.7	6	11.7	2	3.0	~~DNF~~	~~22.0~~	1	0.0	6	11.7	64.1	42.1
5	Giuseppe Milone (ITA)	Roberto Mottola	3	5.7	5	10.0	7	13.0	4	8.0	~~12~~	~~18.0~~	7	13.0	3	5.7	73.4	55.4
6	Claes Thunbo Christensen (DEN)	Finn Thunbo Christensen	6	11.7	~~9~~	~~15.0~~	8	14.0	8	14.0	1	0.0	5	10.0	7	13.0	77.7	62.7
7	Allan Leibel (CAN)	Lorne Leibel	7	13.0	6	11.7	~~DSQ~~	~~24.0~~	6	11.7	3	5.7	9	15.0	4	8.0	89.1	65.1
8	Ben Staartjes (NED)	Ab Ekels	~~11~~	~~17.0~~	7	13.0	5	10.0	7	13.0	8	14.0	6	11.7	11	17.0	95.7	78.7
9	Félix Gancedo (ESP)	Jesús Turró	8	14.0	11	17.0	1	0.0	10	16.0	~~14~~	~~20.0~~	10	16.0	10	16.0	99.0	79.0
10	Jörn Hellner (AUS)	James Byrne	~~14~~	~~20.0~~	13	19.0	10	16.0	14	20.0	4	8.0	8	14.0	9	15.0	112.0	92.0
11	David Wilkins (IRL)	Derek Jago	9	15.0	8	14.0	9	15.0	12	18.0	10	16.0	~~DSQ~~	~~24.0~~	12	18.0	120.0	96.0
12	Carl Auteried Jr. (AUT)	Wolfgang Böhm	10	16.0	14	20.0	11	17.0	11	17.0	5	10.0	11	17.0	~~DNS~~	~~22.0~~	119.0	97.0
13	John Foster (ISV)	Dan Morrison	~~15~~	~~21.0~~	10	16.0	12	18.0	13	19.0	6	11.7	12	18.0	13	19.0	122.7	101.7
14	Alan Warren (GBR)	David Hunt	12	18.0	12	18.0	14	20.0	9	15.0	13	19.0	~~RET~~	~~22.0~~	8	14.0	126.0	104.0
15	John Hoyt (PUR)	Hovey Freeman	13	19.0	~~15~~	~~21.0~~	13	19.0	15	21.0	15	21.0	13	19.0	14	20.0	140.0	119.0
16	Jesus Villarreal (PHI)	Juan Villareal	~~DNF~~	~~22.0~~	16	22.0	15	21.0	16	22.0	11	17.0	14	20.0	15	21.0	145.0	123.0

DNF = Did Not Finish, DNS= Did Not Start, DSQ = Disqualified, PMS = Premature Start, YMP = Yacht Materially Prejudiced
= Male, = Female

The British pairing of Allen Warren and David Hunt had their boat, Gift 'Orse damaged while in transit to the competition, which impacted on their performance. After the final race, Warren and Hunt took some acetone and a flare and set the boat on fire.

=== Daily standings ===
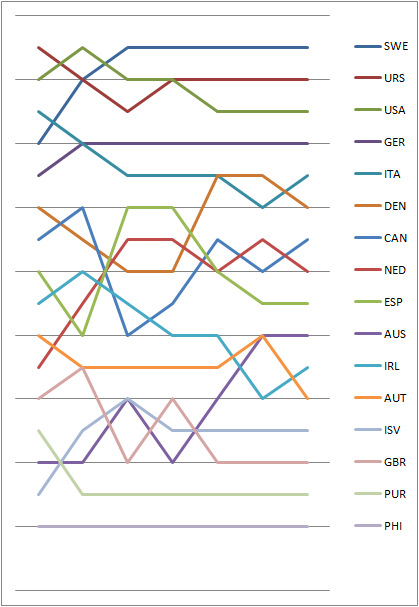
Graph showing the daily standings in the Tempest during the 1976 Summer Olympics
