= Dan Morrison (sailor) =

United States Virgin Islands sailor

Personal information
- Full name: Daniel David Morrison
- Born: November 20, 1931; Sarasota, Florida, U.S.
- Died: March 13, 1993 (aged 61); Quincy, Florida, U.S.

Sport
- Sport: Sailing

Daniel David Morrison (November 20, 1931 – March 13, 1993) was a sailor who represented the United States Virgin Islands. He competed in the Tempest event at the 1976 Summer Olympics.
