= Juan Villareal =

Filipino sailor

Personal information
- Nationality: Filipino

Sport
- Sport: Sailing

Juan Villareal is a Filipino sailor. He competed in the Tempest event at the 1976 Summer Olympics.
