= Gregor Braun =

German cyclist (born 1955)

Personal information
- Born: 31 December 1955 (age 70) Neustadt an der Weinstraße, West Germany

Cycling career
- Sport: Cycling
- Current team: Retired
- Disciplines: Road; Track
- Role: Rider

Professional teams
- 1977–1979: Peugeot–Esso–Michelin
- 1980: Sanson–Campagnolo
- 1981: Famcucine–Campagnolo
- 1982: Capri Sonne–Campagnolo–Merckx
- 1983: Vivi–Benotto
- 1984: La Redoute
- 1985: Ariostea–Oece
- 1986: Murella–Fanini
- 1987: AD Renting–Fangio–IOC–MBK
- 1988: Boccaccio Life–La William
- 1989: Titanbonifica–Benotto

Major wins
- Grand Tours Giro d'Italia 1 individual stage (1973) Stage races Deutschland Tour (1980) One-day races and Classics National Road Race Championships (1978, 1980, 1983) Rund um den Henninger Turm (1978) Tre Valli Varesine (1981) Kuurne–Brussels–Kuurne (1982)
Medal record
Men's cycling
Representing West Germany
Olympic Games
Gold medal – first place	1976 Montreal	Individual Pursuit
Gold medal – first place	1976 Montreal	Team Pursuit

Gregor Braun (German pronunciation: [ˈɡʁeːɡoːɐ̯ ˈbʁaʊn]; born 31 December 1955) is a retired track cyclist and road bicycle racer from Germany, who was a professional rider from 1977 to 1989 and who became a multiple Olympic Gold medaillist and track world champion. his profession was a locksmith.

He represented West Germany at the 1976 Summer Olympics in Montreal, Canada, where he won the gold medal in both the men's individual pursuit and in the team pursuit with Peter Vonhof, Hans Lutz and Günther Schumacher, corroborating their win a year before, also as amateurs, with capturing the gold in the men's team pursuit in the 1975 world championships in Montreal. The West German Olympic track team for 1976 was managed by former track champion Gustav Kilian. In 1977 Braun turned professional, riding mostly on the road and proving himself a capable rider on the road by winning, inter alia, the Giro di Sardegna (1983, 1980), the 14th stage of the 1983 Giro d'Italia, Kuurne–Brussels–Kuurne (1982), the Tre Valli Varesine (1981), Milano–Vignola (1981), the Deutschland Tour (1980), the Tour d'Indre-et-Loire (1979), the then Rund um den Henninger-Turm, three national road championships (1983, 1980, 1978) and ending on the podium in the 1982 Paris–Roubaix, the 1982 Amstel Gold Race and the 1978 Tour of Flanders.

On the track as a professional, Braun became world champion in the (then) 5k pursuit in the 1977 world championships and the 1978 track world championships and won bronze in this discipline in 1985. Furthermore, he won the 1979 European championships madison (with Patrick Sercu). Additionally, Braun started in 44 (mostly German) six-day races, 4 to 6 per season, resulting in 11 wins, with Patrick Sercu (4 wins), René Pijnen (4×), Dietrich Thurau (2×) and Gert Frank (1×) and proving himself very well able to win these races when coupled with a top six-days rider.

In 2023, Braun was found guilty of child sexual abuse and sentenced to thirty-three months in prison.

== Major results ==
=== Road ===
1974
2nd Rund um Düren
1977
2nd Overall Étoile des Espoirs

1st Prologue (TTT)

2nd Overall Circuit Cycliste Sarthe
6th Grand Prix des Nations
9th Overall Tour Méditerranéen

1st Stage 2a

10th Rund um den Henninger Turm
1978
1st Road race, National Road Championships
1st Rund um den Henninger Turm
1st Prologue Tour Méditerranéen
1st Prologue (TTT) Tour d'Indre-et-Loire
3rd Tour of Flanders
6th Critérium des As
7th Amstel Gold Race
10th Overall Tour of Belgium

1st Stage 3

1979
1st Overall Tour d'Indre-et-Loire
1st Stage 4 Tour Méditerranéen
3rd Rund um den Henninger Turm
4th Overall Four Days of Dunkirk
9th Grand Prix des Nations
1980
1st Road race, National Road Championships
1st Overall Deutschland Tour
1st Overall Giro di Sardegna

1st Stage 2b (ITT)

1st Stage 5 (ITT) Tirreno–Adriatico
1st Stage 2b Tour d'Indre-et-Loire
2nd Overall Cronostaffetta (TTT)

1st Stage 1c (ITT)

3rd Nice–Alassio
5th Trofeo Pantalica
1981
1st Tre Valli Varesine
1st Milano–Vignola
1st Flèche Hesbignonne
2nd GP Union Dortmund
3rd Overall Ruota d'Oro
4th Gent–Wevelgem
1982
1st Kuurne–Brussels–Kuurne
3rd Paris–Roubaix
3rd Amstel Gold Race
5th Overall Tirreno–Adriatico

1st Stage 5

5th Rund um den Henninger Turm
5th Paris–Brussels
10th Brabantse Pijl
10th Gent–Wevelgem
1983
1st Road race, National Road Championships
1st Overall Giro di Sardegna
1st Stage 14 Giro d'Italia
2nd Trofeo Laigueglia
6th Gent–Wevelgem
10th Overall Three Days of De Panne
1984
5th Paris–Roubaix
7th Tour of Flanders
1985
2nd Firenze–Pistoia
1987
1st Stage 1a (ITT) Setmana Catalana de Ciclisme

=== Track ===
1973
National Junior Track Championships

1st Madison
1st Individual pursuit

2nd Individual pursuit, European Junior Track Championships
1975
1st Team pursuit, UCI Amateur Track World Championships
National Amateur Track Championships

1st Individual pursuit
1st Madison

1976
Olympic Games

1st Individual pursuit
1st Team pursuit

National Amateur Track Championships

1st Individual pursuit
1st Madison

1977
1st Individual pursuit, UCI Track World Championships
1978
1st Individual pursuit, UCI Track World Championships
1st Madison (with Patrick Sercu), European Track Championships
1st Six Days of Munich (with Patrick Sercu)
1979
1st Six Days of Cologne (with Patrick Sercu)
1st Six Days of Frankfurt (with René Pijnen)
1980
1st Six Days of Dortmund (with Patrick Sercu)
1st Six Days of Berlin (with Patrick Sercu)
1st Six Days of Frankfurt (with René Pijnen)
1981
1st Six Days of Berlin (with Dietrich Thurau)
1st Six Days of Frankfurt (with Dietrich Thurau)
1st Six Days of Bremen (with René Pijnen)
1983
1st Madison (with Henry Rinklin), National Track Championships
1st Six Days of Bremen (with René Pijnen)
1984
1st Six Days of Stuttgart (with Gert Frank)
1985
3rd Individual pursuit, UCI Track World Championships

Awards
Preceded by Peter-Michael Kolbe	German Sportsman of the Year; 1976	Succeeded by Dietrich Thurau
