= Adrian Prosser =

Canadian cyclist (1956–2024)

Personal information
- Born: 28 July 1956 Hemel Hempstead, Hertfordshire, England
- Died: 2 May 2024 (aged 67)

Cycling career
- Sport: Cycling

Adrian Prosser (28 July 1956 – 2 May 2024) was a Canadian cyclist. He competed in the team pursuit event at the 1976 Summer Olympics.

Prosser died unexpectedly on 2 May 2024, at the age of 67.
