= John Thorsen =

Australian cyclist

Personal information
- Born: 11 September 1957 (age 69)

Cycling career
- Sport: Cycling

John Thorsen (born 11 September 1957) is an Australian former cyclist. He competed in the team pursuit event at the 1976 Summer Olympics.
