= Wolfgang Böhm =

Austrian sailor

Personal information
- Nationality: Austrian
- Born: 16 September 1941 (age 83); Vienna, Nazi Germany

Sport
- Sport: Sailing

Wolfgang Böhm (born 16 September 1941) is an Austrian sailor. He competed in the Tempest event at the 1976 Summer Olympics.
