= Dieter Berkmann =

German cyclist (born 1950)

Personal information
- Born: 27 July 1950 (age 76) Mittenwald, West Germany

Cycling career
- Sport: Cycling
- Current team: Retired
- Discipline: Track
- Role: Rider
- Rider type: Sprinter
Medal record
Men's track cycling
Representing East Germany
World Championships
Silver medal – second place	1978 Munich	Sprint
Silver medal – second place	1979 Amsterdam	Sprint

Dieter Berkmann (born 27 July 1950) is a German former cyclist. He competed for West Germany at the 1972 Summer Olympics and 1976 Summer Olympics.
