= Paul Bonno =

French cyclist

Personal information
- Born: 29 January 1954 (age 72)

Cycling career
- Sport: Cycling

Paul Bonno (born 29 January 1954) is a French former cyclist. He competed in the team pursuit event at the 1976 Summer Olympics.
