= Anne Riemersma =

Dutch cyclist (born 1954)

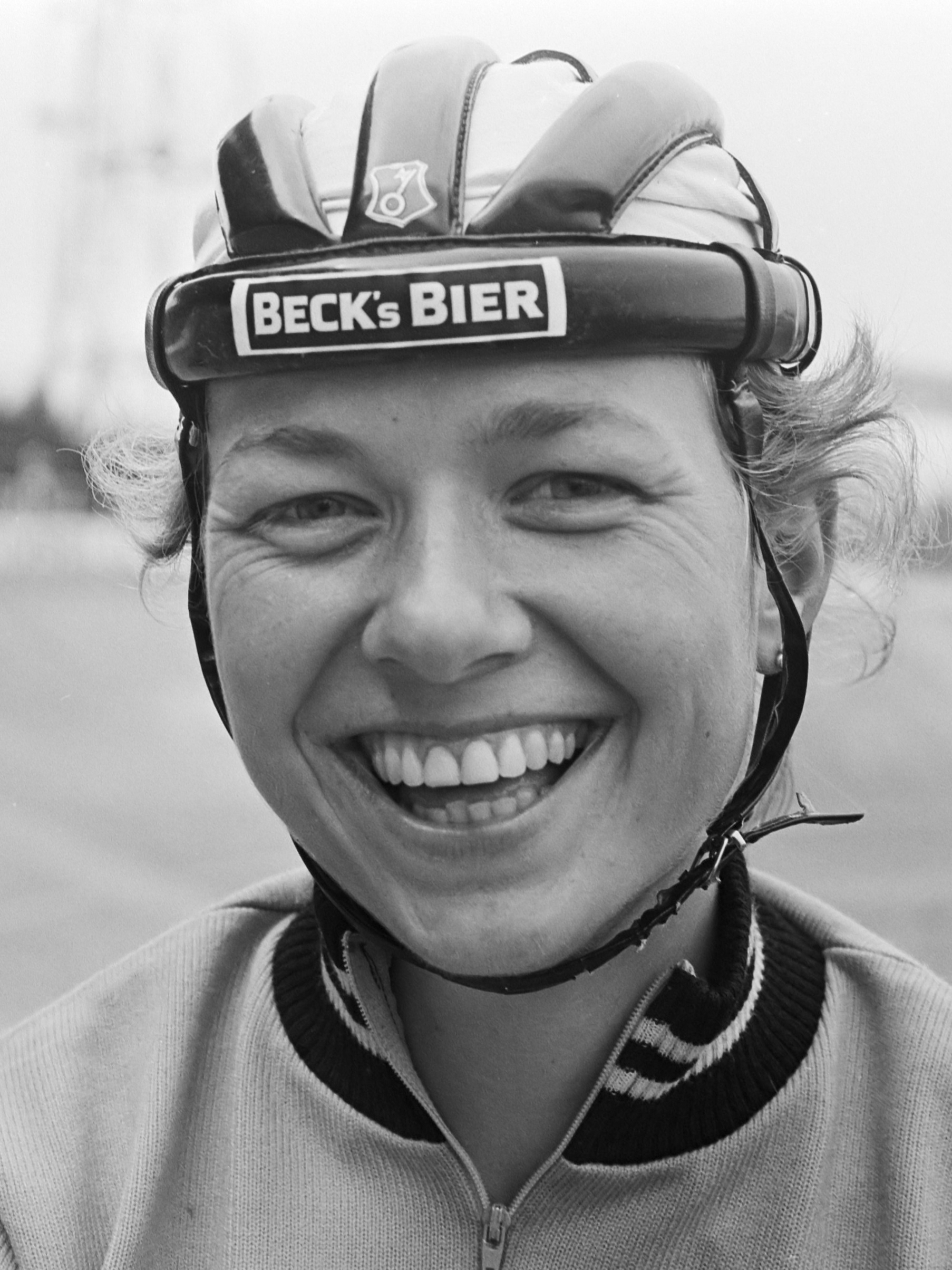
- Anne Riemersma in 1978

Personal information
- Born: 1954 (age 71–72) Netherlands

Cycling career
- Sport: Cycling
- Role: Rider (road and track)
- Rider type: Endurance

Professional team
- 1977–1980: Beck's Bier
Medal record
Representing Netherlands
Track Cycling World Championships
Silver medal – second place	1977 San Cristóbal	individual pursuit
Silver medal – second place	1978 Munich	individual pursuit
Silver medal – second place	1979 Amsterdam	individual pursuit

Anne Riemersma (born 1954) is a Dutch road and track racing cyclist. She was a three times silver medal winner in the individual pursuit at the UCI Track Cycling World Championships, in 1977, 1978 and 1979. She became national track cycling champion in the individual pursuit and the omnium in 1978.

She married Gerrit Möhlmann and changed her last name to Anne Möhlmann. Her husband, sons Pleuni Möhlmann and Peter Möhlmann, and son-in-law Fulco Van Gulik were also professional cyclists.
