= Zbigniew Szczepkowski =

Polish cyclist (1952–2019)

Personal information
- Born: 4 May 1952 Nowogard, Poland
- Died: 4 February 2019 (aged 66) Warsaw, Poland

Cycling career
- Sport: Cycling

Zbigniew Szczepkowski (4 May 1952 – 4 February 2019) was a Polish cyclist. He competed in the team pursuit event at the 1976 Summer Olympics.

He was buried in Nowogard in Zachodniopomorskie Voivodeship.
