= Derek Jago =

Irish sailor (born 1942)

Personal information
- Nationality: Irish
- Born: 8 July 1942 (age 82); Cork, Ireland

Sport
- Sport: Sailing

Derek Jago (born 8 July 1942) is an Irish sailor. He competed in the Tempest event at the 1976 Summer Olympics.
