= Yoshiaki Ogasawara =

Japanese cyclist

Personal information
- Born: 29 April 1954 (age 72)

Cycling career
- Sport: Cycling

Yoshiaki Ogasawara (小笠原 義明, Ogasawara Yoshiaki; born 29 April 1954) is a Japanese former cyclist. He competed in the team pursuit event at the 1976 Summer Olympics. He was also a professional keirin cyclist.
