= Ian Banbury =

British cyclist

Personal information
- Born: 27 November 1957 (age 68) Hemel Hempstead, Hertfordshire, England

Cycling career
- Sport: Cycling
Medal record
Men's cycling
Representing Great Britain
Olympic Games
Bronze medal – third place	1976 Montreal	Team Pursuit

Ian A. Banbury (born 27 November 1957) was a British cyclist. He won the bronze medal in the team pursuit at the 1976 Montreal Games. He raced as an amateur for the Hemel Hempstead cycling club and as a professional for a number of British-based teams, including Holdsworth-Campagnolo, MAN Trucks, and Moore Large. He competed on the road and the track, particularly in the individual and team pursuit events.
