= Jesús Turró =

Spanish sailor

Personal information
- Nationality: Spanish
- Born: 9 December 1952 (age 72); Barcelona, Spain

Sport
- Sport: Sailing

Jesús Turró (born 9 December 1952) is a Spanish sailor. He competed in the Tempest event at the 1976 Summer Olympics.
