= Tadashi Ogasawara =

Japanese cyclist

Personal information
- Born: 21 June 1955 (age 71)

Cycling career
- Sport: Cycling

Tadashi Ogasawara (小笠原 嘉, Ogasawara Tadashi; born 21 June 1955) is a Japanese former cyclist. He competed in the team pursuit event at the 1976 Summer Olympics. He was also a professional keirin cyclist.
