= Gerrie Slot =

Dutch track cyclist

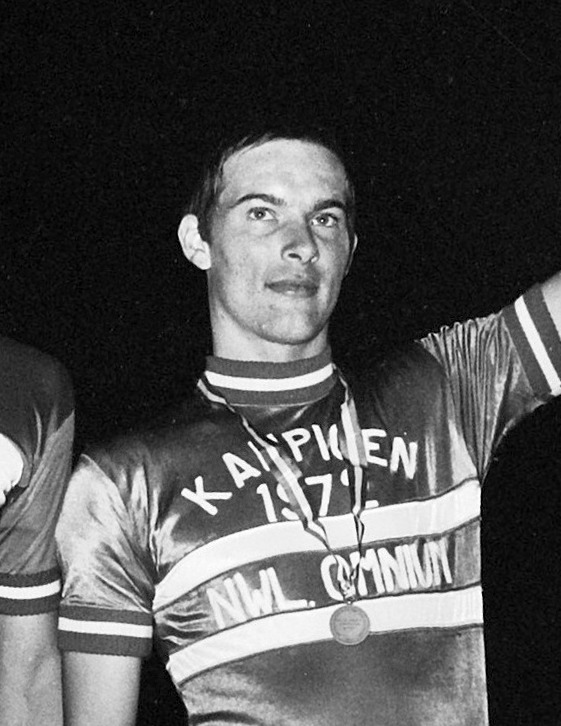
- Gerrie Slot in 1974

Personal information
- Born: 23 May 1954 (age 72) Alkmaar, the Netherlands
- Height: 1.84 m (6 ft 0 in)
- Weight: 78 kg (172 lb)

Sport
- Sport: Cycling

Gerrit "Gerrie" Slot (born 23 May 1954) is a retired amateur Dutch track cyclist who was active between 1973 and 1980. He competed at the 1976 Summer Olympics in the 4 km team pursuit and finished in fifth place. In 1979 he won the national title in the point race.

== See also ==
- List of Dutch Olympic cyclists
