= Rainer Hönisch =

German cyclist

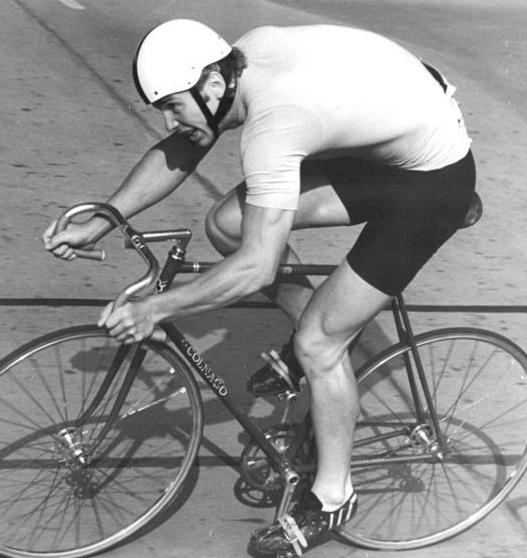
- Rainer Hönisch in 1978

Personal information
- Born: 21 January 1959 (age 67) Berlin, Germany

Cycling career
- Sport: Cycling
- Discipline: Track cycling
- Role: Rider

Amateur team
- ?: SC Dynamo Berlin / SV Dynamo
Medal record
Representing East Germany
Men's track cycling
World Championships
Bronze medal – third place	1978 Munich	Track time trial

Rainer Hönisch (born 21 January 1959) is a German cyclist. He was born in Berlin, and competed for the SC Dynamo Berlin / Sportvereinigung (SV) Dynamo. He won bronze at the 1978 UCI Track Cycling World Championships in the 1 km time trial for amateurs.
