= Kim Svendsen =

Danish cyclist

Personal information
- Full name: Kim Gunnar Svendsen
- Born: 24 December 1955 (age 70) Roskilde, Denmark

Cycling career
- Sport: Cycling

Kim Gunnar Svendsen (born 24 December 1955) is a Danish former cyclist. He competed in the team pursuit event at the 1976 Summer Olympics.
