= Luis Manrique =

Colombian cyclist

Luis Carlos Manrique
Personal information
- Born: 8 September 1955 (age 71) Onzaga, Colombia

Cycling career
- Sport: Cycling

Luis Carlos Manrique (born 8 September 1955) is a Colombian former cyclist. He competed in the individual road race and team time trial events at the 1976 Summer Olympics.
