= Finn Thunbo Christensen =

Danish sailor

Personal information
- Nationality: Danish
- Born: 16 November 1951 (age 73); Copenhagen, Denmark

Sport
- Sport: Sailing

Finn Thunbo Christensen (born 16 November 1951) is a Danish sailor. He competed in the Tempest event at the 1976 Summer Olympics.
