= Carlos Mesa (cyclist) =

Colombian cyclist

Personal information
- Born: 21 August 1955 (age 71)

Cycling career
- Sport: Cycling

Carlos Mesa (born 21 August 1955) is a Colombian former cyclist. He competed in the team pursuit event at the 1976 Summer Olympics.
