= Jörn Hellner =

Australian sailor

Personal information
- Nationality: Australian
- Born: 6 October 1945 (age 79)

Sport
- Sport: Sailing

Jörn Hellner (born 6 October 1945) is an Australian sailor. He competed in the Tempest event at the 1976 Summer Olympics.
