= Paul Deem =

American cyclist (1957–2025)

Personal information
- Born: August 16, 1957 Dreux-Louvillier Air Base, Eure-et-Loir, France
- Died: October 7, 2025 (aged 68)

Cycling career
- Sport: Cycling
- Disciplines: Track; Road
- Role: Rider

Paul Thomas Deem (August 16, 1957 – October 7, 2025) was an American track cyclist who set the 1974 national record for the 3 km Velodrome in Encino, California. Deem won the gold medal for the 4 km team pursuit in the 1975 Pan American Games in Mexico City. Deem finished the team pursuit in tenth place at the 1976 Summer Olympics in Montreal with Leonard Nitz, James Ochowicz, Ralph Therrio.

At the 1977 U.S. National Cycling Championships in Seattle, Washington, Deem won first place in the individual time trial, individual pursuit, team pursuit, and the 100 km time trial. No one since Deem has won four first-place positions at one cycling competition. Deem retired from competitive cycling in 1981 due to a progressive loss of muscle tissue caused by Charcot–Marie–Tooth disease. However, Deem continues coaching cyclists in Orange County, California.

Deem is owner of CycleWerks in Costa Mesa and San Clemente, California.

On August 27, 2013, Deem's wife, Debra Healy Deem, was hit by a motor vehicle when she was cycling on Pacific Coast Highway in Newport Beach, California. She died from sustained injuries (blunt forced trauma to the brain) the following day.

Deem died on October 7, 2025, at the age of 68.
