= Jørn Lund (cyclist) =

Danish cyclist (born 1944)

Personal information
- Born: 26 August 1944 (age 82) Astrup, Mariagerfjord, Denmark

Cycling career
- Sport: Cycling
Medal record
Men's cycling
Representing Denmark
Olympic Games
Bronze medal – third place	1976 Montreal	Team time trial

Jørn Lund (born 26 August 1944) is a Danish former cyclist who competed in multiple Summer Olympics. He took part in the men's 100 km team time trial in the 1972 and 1976 Olympic Games. His 1976 team, which also included Verner Blaudzun, Gert Frank, and Jørgen Hansen, won a bronze medal, finishing behind the Soviet Union and Poland and beating out West Germany and Czechoslovakia for third place.
