= Bo Lilja =

Danish sports shooter (born 1950)

Personal information
- Nationality: Danish
- Born: 25 December 1950 (age 74); Helsingborg, Sweden

Sport
- Sport: Sports shooting

Bo Lilja (born 25 December 1950) is a Danish sports shooter. He competed at the 1976 Summer Olympics, the 1984 Summer Olympics and the 1992 Summer Olympics.
