= Rino De Candido =

Italian cyclist

Personal information
- Born: 2 June 1954 (age 72) San Giorgio della Richinvelda, Italy

Cycling career
- Sport: Cycling

Rino De Candido (born 2 June 1954) is an Italian former cyclist. He competed in the team pursuit event at the 1976 Summer Olympics.
