= Waldemar Pedrazzi =

Uruguayan cyclist

Personal information
- Born: 7 April 1955 (age 71)

Cycling career
- Sport: Cycling

Waldemar Pedrazzi (born 7 April 1955) is a Uruguayan former cyclist. He competed in the individual road race and team pursuit events at the 1976 Summer Olympics. He also won the Rutas de America in 1974.
