= Gerrit Möhlmann =

Dutch cyclist (born 1950)

Personal information
- Born: 2 August 1950 (age 76) Apeldoorn, the Netherlands
- Height: 1.91 m (6 ft 3 in)
- Weight: 78 kg (172 lb)

Sport
- Sport: Cycling

Gerrit Möhlmann (born 2 August 1950) is a retired Dutch cyclist who was active between 1972 and 1989. On track, he finished in fifth place in the 4 km team pursuit at the 1976 Summer Olympics. On the road, he won the Stausee-Rundfahrt Klingnau in 1978 and Hel van het Mergelland in 1988, as well as individual stages of the Olympia's Tour (1978 and 1979).

Möhlmann is married to the cyclist Anne Riemersma. Their son Peter and daughter Pleuni are also professional cyclists.

== See also ==
- List of Dutch Olympic cyclists
