= Jhon Quiceno =

Colombian cyclist

Personal information
- Born: 2 August 1954 (age 72)

Cycling career
- Sport: Cycling

Jhon Jairo Quiceno (born 2 August 1954) is a Colombian former cyclist. He competed in the team pursuit event at the 1976 Summer Olympics.
