= Niagara Square (shopping centre) =

Shopping centre in Niagara Falls, Ontario, Canada

Coordinates: 43.06640°N 79.12523°W

The Niagara Square was a shopping centre and former mall in Niagara Falls, Ontario, Canada. The Niagara Square opened in 1977. The interior of the shopping centre was closed in 2017, with some stores remaining open in the exterior. Before its closure, the Niagara Square was a 36,000-square-metre (390,000 sq ft) shopping centre with 83 units. After its demolition, the property was repurposed for use as a Costco location.

== History ==
=== Early history ===
The Niagara Square opened in 1977, when development in the southwest end of Niagara Falls was scarce. 200,000 people attended the opening of the shopping centre. Opening day of the Niagara Square was Wednesday, August 17, 1977 at 10:00 AM. Niagara Square, along with the opening of casinos, created increased demand for better public infrastructure which was not remedied until the 2000s. At its peak, the shopping centre hosted forty-nine stores, three bank branches, and an auditorium which was used for events.

=== Demolition and reuse ===
Before the demolition of the shopping centre, more than one-third of the tenants occupying the space had left prior to its closure. Remaining tenants either relocated or remained in outbuildings that were not planned for demolition or their leases were not renewed. In April 2017, the shopping centre closed. Demolition of the interior began in the spring of 2019. The owners invested 25 million dollars into the demolition and redevelopment of Niagara Square. Bayfield Realty Advisors met with Jim Diodati (the mayor of Niagara Falls) and city staff to discuss redevelopment. Costco, a warehouse retail outlet, used the property to open a new location in 2020. In total, the Costco store is 150,000 square feet. The interior of the shopping centre has been demolished and is used as parking lot space. The store itself is located along the back of the property.

== See also ==
- Dead mall
- Retail apocalypse
