= Washington Díaz =

Uruguayan cyclist

Personal information
- Born: 29 June 1954 (age 72) Maldonado, Uruguay

Cycling career
- Sport: Cycling

Washington Díaz (born 29 June 1954) is a Uruguayan former cyclist. He competed in the three events at the 1976 Summer Olympics.
