= Jorge Hernández (cyclist) =

Colombian cyclist (born 1948)

Personal information
- Nickname: Batman
- Born: 6 September 1948 (age 78) Santa Fe de Antioquia, Colombia
- Height: 5 ft 5 in (165 cm)
- Weight: 68 kg (150 lb)

Cycling career
- Sport: Cycling

Jorge Hernández Jiménez (born 6 September 1948) is a Colombian former cyclist. He competed in the 1000m time trial events at the 1968 Summer Olympics and the team pursuit event at the 1976 Summer Olympics.
