= Jean-Jacques Rebière =

French cyclist

Personal information
- Born: 17 November 1952 (age 73) Bègles, France

Cycling career
- Sport: Cycling

Jean-Jacques Rebière (born 17 November 1952) is a French former cyclist. He competed in the individual and team pursuit events at the 1976 Summer Olympics.
