= Claes Thunbo Christensen =

Danish sailor

Personal information
- Nationality: Danish
- Born: 25 January 1953 (age 72); Copenhagen, Denmark

Sport
- Sport: Sailing

Claes Thunbo Christensen (born 25 January 1953) is a Danish sailor. He competed in the Tempest event at the 1976 Summer Olympics.
