= Kim Refshammer =

Danish cyclist

Personal information
- Born: 14 September 1955 Copenhagen, Denmark
- Died: 25 February 2002 (aged 46) Copenhagen, Denmark

Cycling career
- Sport: Cycling

Kim Refshammer (14 September 1955 – 25 February 2002) was a Danish cyclist. He competed in the team pursuit event at the 1976 Summer Olympics.
