= Krzysztof Sujka =

Polish cyclist

Personal information
- Born: 19 October 1955 (age 70) Pabianice, Poland

Cycling career
- Sport: Cycling

Krzysztof Sujka (born 19 October 1955) is a Polish former cyclist. He competed at the 1976 Summer Olympics and the 1980 Summer Olympics.
