= Ivar Jakobsen =

Danish cyclist

Personal information
- Born: 5 January 1954 (age 72) Frederiksberg, Denmark

Cycling career
- Sport: Cycling

Ivar Jakobsen (born 5 January 1954) is a Danish former cyclist. He competed in the team pursuit event at the 1976 Summer Olympics.
