= Jean-Marcel Brouzes =

French cyclist

Personal information
- Born: 3 June 1953 (age 73) Drancy, France

Cycling career
- Sport: Cycling

Jean-Marcel Brouzes (born 3 June 1953) is a French former cyclist. He competed in the team pursuit event at the 1976 Summer Olympics.
