= Hugh Walton =

Canadian cyclist

Personal information
- Born: 30 May 1955 (age 71) Vancouver, British Columbia, Canada

Cycling career
- Sport: Cycling

Hugh Walton (born 30 May 1955) is a Canadian former cyclist. He competed in the team pursuit event at the 1976 Summer Olympics.
