= Eduard Rapp =

Soviet cyclist

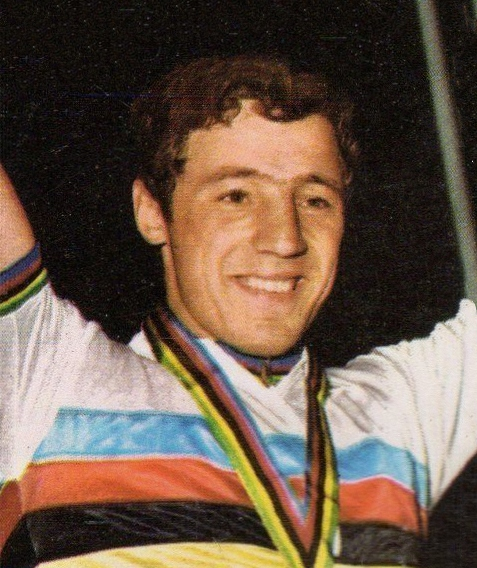

Personal information
- Born: 7 March 1951 (age 75) Omsk, Russian SFSR, Soviet Union
- Height: 175 cm (5 ft 9 in)
- Weight: 80 kg (176 lb)

Cycling career
- Sport: Cycling

Amateur team
- 1971-1979: Burevestnik Omsk
Medal record
Representing the Soviet Union
UCI Track Cycling World Championships
Gold medal – first place	1971 Varese	1 km time trial
Silver medal – second place	1973 San Sebastián	1 km time trial
Gold medal – first place	1974 Montreal	1 km time trial
Silver medal – second place	1975 Liege	1 km time trial
Bronze medal – third place	1979 Amsterdam	1 km time trial

Eduard Reingoldovich Rapp (Russian: Эдуард Рейнгольдович Рапп, born 7 March 1951) is a retired Soviet cyclist who mostly competed on track in the 1 km time trial. In this event he won five medals at the world championships in 1971–79 and placed eighth at the 1972 Summer Olympics.
