= Víctor González (cyclist) =

Uruguayan cyclist (born 1957)

Personal information
- Born: 29 January 1957 (age 69)

Cycling career
- Sport: Cycling

Víctor González (born 29 January 1957) is a Uruguayan former cyclist. He competed in the individual road race and team pursuit events at the 1976 Summer Olympics.
