= Miguel Margalef =

Uruguayan cyclist

Personal information
- Born: 8 March 1956 (age 70)

Cycling career
- Sport: Cycling

Miguel Margalef (born 8 March 1956) is a Uruguayan former cyclist. He competed in the 1000m time trial and team pursuit events at the 1976 Summer Olympics.
