= Peter Nieuwenhuis =

Dutch cyclist (1951–2026)

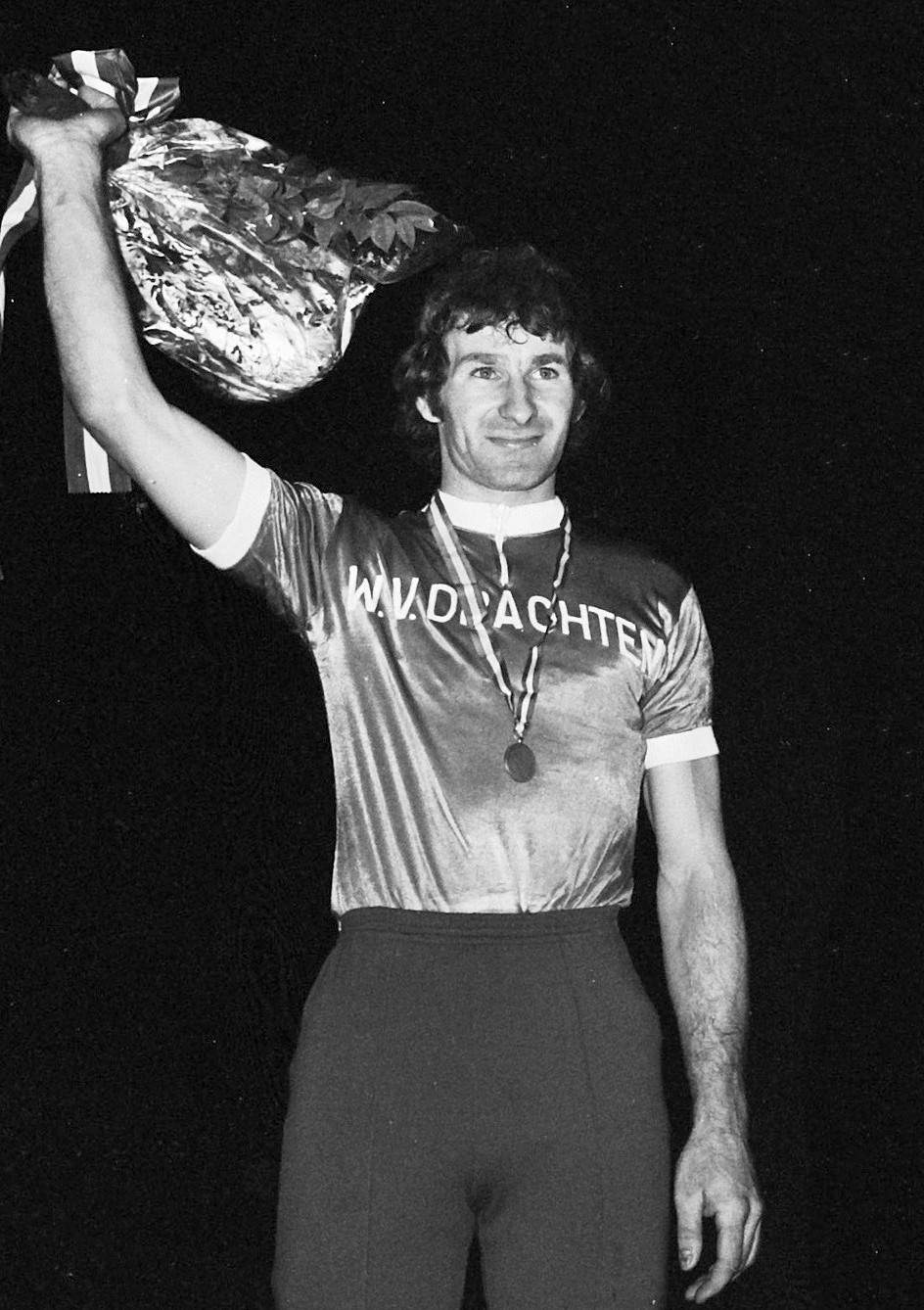
- Peter Nieuwenhuis in 1974

Personal information
- Born: 3 April 1951 Amsterdam, Netherlands
- Died: 15 September 2026 (aged 75)
- Height: 1.85 m (6 ft 1 in)
- Weight: 77 kg (170 lb)

Sport
- Sport: Cycling
Medal record
Representing the Netherlands
UCI Track Cycling World Championships
Bronze medal – third place	1973 San Sebastián	Team pursuit

Peter Marinus Nieuwenhuis (3 April 1951 – 15 September 2026) was a Dutch cyclist who was active between 1970 and 1976. He competed at the 1976 Summer Olympics in the 4 km team pursuit and finished in fifth place. He won a bronze medal in this event at the 1973 World Championships.

Nieuwenhuis died on 15 September 2026, at the age of 75. His wife, Minie Brinkhoff, was also a top-level cyclist.

== See also ==
- List of Dutch Olympic cyclists
