= Miguel Espinós =

Spanish cyclist (1947–2006)

Personal information
- Born: 12 January 1947 Tivenys, Spain
- Died: 16 March 2006 (aged 59) Badalona, Spain
- Height: 1.75 m (5 ft 9 in)
- Weight: 63 kg (139 lb)

Sport
- Sport: Cycling
- Club: Tortosa
Medal record
Representing Spain
UCI Motor-paced World Championships
Bronze medal – third place	1974 Montreal	Amateurs
Silver medal – second place	1975 Rocourt	Amateurs

Miguel Espinós Curto (12 January 1947 – 16 March 2006) was a Spanish cyclist. He won a bronze and a silver medal at the UCI Motor-paced World Championships in 1974 and 1975, respectively. He competed at the 1972 Summer Olympics in the 4000 m individual pursuit and finished in 17th place. Between 1972 and 1975 he won every national championship in this event.
