= Bjarne Sørensen =

Danish cyclist (born 1954)

Personal information
- Born: 23 December 1954 (age 71) Birkerød, Denmark

Cycling career
- Sport: Cycling

Bjarne Sørensen (born 23 December 1954) is a Danish former cyclist. He competed at the 1976 Summer Olympics and the 1980 Summer Olympics.
