= Aleksandr Perov (cyclist) =

Soviet cyclist (born 1955)

Personal information
- Born: 2 June 1955 (age 71) Kaliningrad, Russian SFSR, Soviet Union

Cycling career
- Sport: Cycling
Medal record
Men's cycling
Representing Soviet Union
Olympic Games
Silver medal – second place	1976 Montreal	Team Pursuit

Aleksandr Perov (born 2 June 1955) is a Soviet former cyclist. He won a silver medal in the team pursuit event at the 1976 Summer Olympics.
