= Hans Känel =

Swiss cyclist

Personal information
- Born: 3 May 1953 (age 73) Bern, Switzerland

Cycling career
- Sport: Cycling
- Role: Rider

Hans Känel (born 3 May 1953) is a Swiss former professional racing cyclist. He rode in the 1982 Tour de France. He also competed in the team pursuit event at the 1980 Summer Olympics.
