= Zdeněk Dohnal =

Czech cyclist (born 1948)

Personal information
- Born: 11 August 1948 (age 78) Znojmo, Czechoslovakia

Cycling career
- Sport: Cycling

Zdeněk Dohnal (born 11 August 1948) is a Czech former cyclist. He competed at the 1972 Summer Olympics and 1976 Summer Olympics.
