= Sandro Callari =

Italian cyclist

Personal information
- Born: 14 December 1953 (age 72) Rome, Italy

Cycling career
- Sport: Cycling

Sandro Callari (born 14 December 1953) is an Italian former cyclist. He competed in the team pursuit event at the 1976 Summer Olympics.
