= Viktor Sokolov (cyclist) =

Soviet cyclist

Personal information
- Born: 24 April 1954 (age 72) Klimovsk, Russian SFSR, Soviet Union

Cycling career
- Sport: Cycling
Medal record
Men's cycling
Representing Soviet Union
Olympic Games
Silver medal – second place	1976 Montreal	Team pursuit

Viktor Sokolov (born 24 April 1954) is a Soviet former cyclist. He won a silver medal in the team pursuit (4000 m) event at the 1976 Summer Olympics. in Montreal.
