= Petr Kocek =

Czech cyclist

Personal information
- Born: 26 May 1952 (age 74) Nový Bor, Czechoslovakia

Cycling career
- Sport: Cycling

Petr Kocek (born 26 May 1952) is a Czech former cyclist. He competed at the 1976 Summer Olympics and the 1980 Summer Olympics.
