= José Jaime Galeano =

Colombian cyclist (1945–2021)

Personal information
- Born: 22 December 1945 Antioquia, Colombia
- Died: July 2021 (aged 75)

Cycling career
- Sport: Cycling

José Jaime Galeano (22 December 1945 – July 2021) was a Colombian cyclist. He competed at the 1968 Summer Olympics and the 1976 Summer Olympics.
