= Norbert Dürpisch =

German cyclist

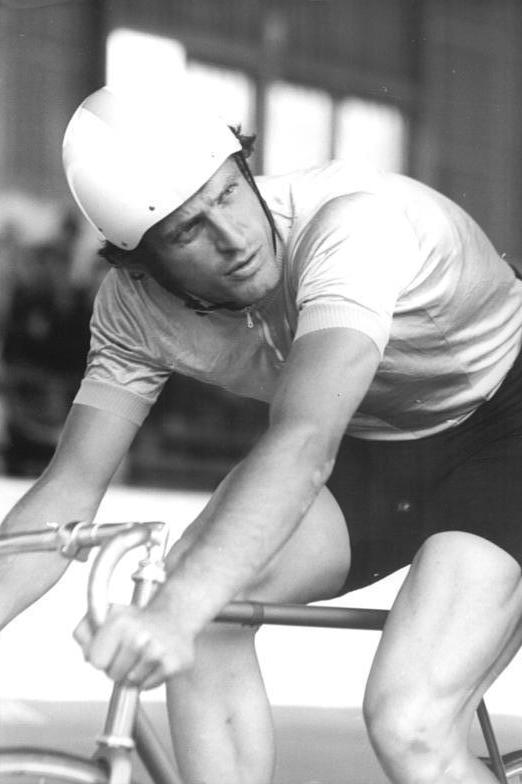
- Norbert Dürpisch in 1977

Personal information
- Born: 29 May 1952 (age 74) Genthin, East Germany

Cycling career
- Sport: Cycling

Norbert Dürpisch (born 29 May 1952) is an East German former cyclist. He competed in the team pursuit event at the 1976 Summer Olympics.
