= Giorgio Rossi =

Italian cyclist

Personal information
- Born: 1 April 1948 (age 78) Rome, Italy
- Height: 1.76 m (5 ft 9 in)
- Weight: 75 kg (165 lb)

Sport
- Sport: Cycling
Medal record
Representing Italy
World Championships
Bronze medal – third place	1973 San Sebastian	Sprint
Bronze medal – third place	1974 Montreal	Sprint
Silver medal – second place	1975 Liege	Sprint
Bronze medal – third place	1980 Besançon	Tandem
Mediterranean Games
Gold medal – first place	1975 Algiers	Sprint

Giorgio Rossi (born 1 April 1948) is a retired Italian amateur track cyclist, who won one silver and three bronze medals in the sprint and tandem events, at the world championships of 1975–1980. He finished ninth in the tandem at the 1972 Summer Olympics and eighth in the sprint at the 1976 Games.
