= Matthias Wiegand =

East German cyclist (born 1954)

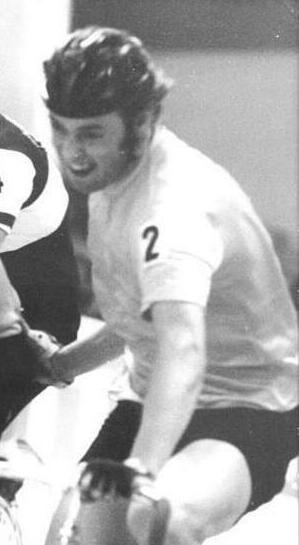
- Wiegand in 1977

Personal information
- Born: 22 April 1954 (age 72) Plauen, East Germany
- Height: 1.78 m (5 ft 10 in)
- Weight: 68 kg (150 lb)

Cycling career
- Sport: Cycling
Medal record
Representing East Germany
Olympic Games
Silver medal – second place	1980 Moscow	Team pursuit
World Championships
Gold medal – first place	1977 San Cristóbal	Team pursuit
Gold medal – first place	1978 Munich	Team pursuit

Matthias Wiegand (born 22 April 1954) is a retired East German track cyclist. He had his best achievements in the 4000 m team pursuit. In this discipline he won a silver medal at the 1980 Summer Olympics, as well as two gold medals at the world championships in 1977 and 1978; his team finished in fourth place at the 1976 Summer Olympics.
