= Peter Vonhof =

German cyclist

Personal information
- Born: 15 January 1949 (age 77) Berlin, Germany

Cycling career
- Sport: Cycling
Medal record
Men's cycling
Representing West Germany
Olympic Games
Gold medal – first place	1972 Munich	Team Pursuit
Gold medal – first place	1976 Montreal	Team Pursuit

Peter Vonhof (born 15 January 1949) is a retired track cyclist and road bicycle racer from Germany, who represented West Germany at the 1976 Summer Olympics in Montreal, Quebec, Canada. There he won the gold medal in the Men's Team Pursuit, alongside Gregor Braun, Hans Lutz and Günther Schumacher.
