= Thomas Huschke =

East German cyclist

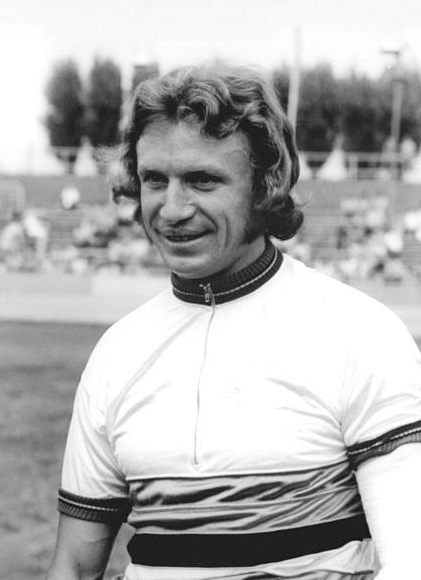
- Huschke in 1975

Personal information
- Born: 29 December 1947 (age 78) Berlin, Germany
- Height: 1.81 m (5 ft 11 in)
- Weight: 75 kg (165 lb)

Sport
- Sport: Cycling
- Club: Berliner TSC
Medal record
Representing East Germany
Olympic Games
Silver medal – second place	1972 Munich	Team pursuit
Bronze medal – third place	1976 Montreal	Individual pursuit
World championships
Gold medal – first place	1975 Rocourt	Individual pursuit
Silver medal – second place	1970 Leicester	Team pursuit
Silver medal – second place	1971 Varese	Team pursuit
Silver medal – second place	1974 Montreal	Team pursuit
Bronze medal – third place	1974 Montreal	Individual pursuit
Bronze medal – third place	1975 Rocourt	team pursuit

Thomas Huschke (born 29 December 1947) is a retired East German cyclist. He competed at the 1972 and 1976 Summer Olympics in the 4000m individual and team pursuit events. He won a silver team medal in 1972 and an individual bronze medal in 1976, where his team also finished in fourth place overall.

Between 1970 and 1975 he won one gold, three silver and two bronze medals in the same two events at world championships.

As a road racer, he finished third in the Tour of Belgium in 1972, and won one stage of the Peace Race in 1973.

After retiring from competitions he received a degree in economics, and later briefly worked as a marketing expert of the East German Gymnastics and Sports Association. In 1988 he was manager of figure skater Katarina Witt. From 2004 to 2006 he was chairman of the Frankfurter Cycling Club.

His grandfather Adolf and father Gerhard were both competitive cyclists.
