= Vitaly Petrakov =

Soviet olympic cyclist

Personal information
- Born: 10 December 1954 (age 71) Tula, Russian SFSR, Soviet Union

Cycling career
- Sport: Cycling
Medal record
Men's cycling
Representing Soviet Union
Olympic Games
Silver medal – second place	1976 Montreal	Team Pursuit
Gold medal – first place	1980 Moscow	Team Pursuit

Vitaly Aleksandrovich Petrakov (born 10 December 1954) is a Soviet former cyclist. He won the silver medal in the Men's team pursuit at the 1976 Summer Olympics. He won the gold medal in the men's team pursuit at the 1980 Summer Olympics.
