= Hans Lutz =

German cyclist (born 1949)

Personal information
- Born: 31 March 1949 (age 77) Stuttgart, Allied-occupied Germany

Cycling career
- Sport: Cycling
Medal record
Men's cycling
Representing West Germany
Olympic Games
Gold medal – first place	1976 Montreal	Team Pursuit
Bronze medal – third place	1972 Munich	Individual Pursuit

Hans Lutz (born 31 March 1949) is a retired track cyclist and road bicycle racer from Germany, who represented West Germany at the 1976 Summer Olympics in Montreal, Quebec, Canada. There he won the gold medal in the Men's Team Pursuit, alongside Gregor Braun, Peter Vonhof and Günther Schumacher. Four years earlier, when Munich hosted the Summer Olympics, he won the bronze medal in the Men's 4.000m Individual Pursuit.

Lutz has on the champion with the West Germany team four consecutive seasons: 1973, 1974 and 1975.
