= Vladimir Osokin =

Soviet cyclist

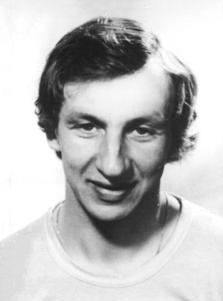
- Vladimir Osokin in 1977

Personal information
- Born: 8 January 1954 (age 72) Leningrad, Russian SFSR, Soviet Union
- Height: 1.81 m (5 ft 11 in)
- Weight: 73 kg (161 lb)

Cycling career
- Sport: Cycling
Medal record
Representing the Soviet Union
Olympic Games
Gold medal – first place	1980 Moscow	Team pursuit
Silver medal – second place	1976 Montreal	Team pursuit
World championships
Silver medal – second place	1975 Rocourt	Team pursuit
Silver medal – second place	1975 Rocourt	Individual pursuit
Silver medal – second place	1978 Munich	Team pursuit
Silver medal – second place	1979 Amsterdam	Team pursuit
Silver medal – second place	1981 Brno	Team pursuit

Vladimir Yuryevich Osokin (Russian: Владимир Юрьевич Осокин; born 8 January 1954) is a retired Soviet cyclist. He won a silver and a gold medal in the 4000 m team pursuit at the 1976 and 1980 Summer Olympics, respectively; individually, he finished in fourth and fifth place. Between 1975 and 1981 he won five silver medals in the individual and team pursuit at the world championships.

As a road racer, he finished second in the multistage Peace Race individually and first in the team competition in 1977.

Osokin has a degree in engineering from the Kirov Leningrad Institute of Textile and Light Industry (now St. Petersburg State University of Technology and Design).
