= Sue Novara-Reber =

American track cyclist (born 1955)

Sue Novara-Reber (born November 22, 1955, in Flint, Michigan) is a retired American track cyclist who has won seven medals in the UCI Track Cycling World Championships. She was inducted into the United States Bicycling Hall of Fame in 1991.
