= Uwe Unterwalder =

East German cyclist

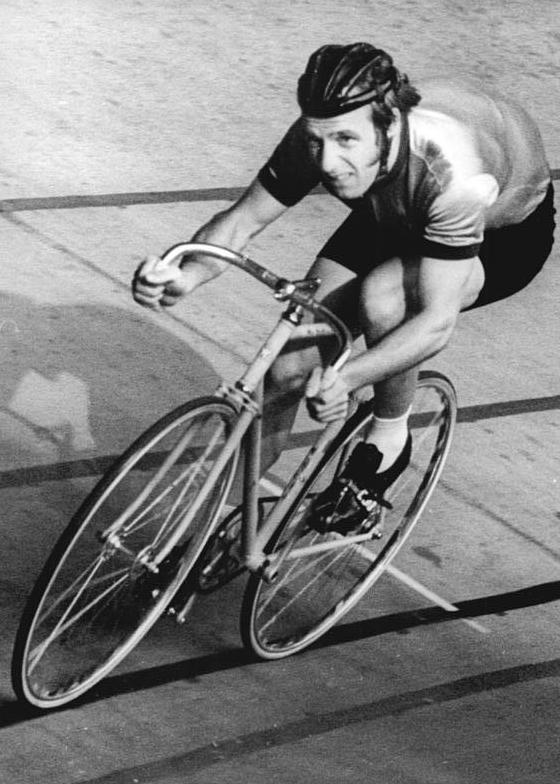
- Uwe Unterwalder in 1976

Personal information
- Born: 15 July 1950 (age 76) Berlin, Germany
- Height: 1.80 m (5 ft 11 in)
- Weight: 58 kg (128 lb)

Cycling career
- Sport: Cycling
Medal record
Representing East Germany
Olympic Games
Silver medal – second place	1972 Munich	Team pursuit
Silver medal – second place	1980 Moscow	Team pursuit
World Championships
Silver medal – second place	1971 Varese	Team pursuit
Silver medal – second place	1974 Montreal	Team pursuit
Bronze medal – third place	1975 Liege	Team pursuit
Silver medal – second place	1977 San Cristóbal	Individual pursuit
Gold medal – first place	1978 Munich	Team pursuit
Bronze medal – third place	1978 Munich	Individual pursuit

Uwe Unterwalder (born 15 July 1950) is a retired East German track cyclist. He had his best achievements in the 4000 m individual and team pursuit. In these disciplines he won two silver medal at the 1972 and 1980 Summer Olympics, as well as six medals at the world championships in 1971–1978; his team finished in fourth place at the 1976 Summer Olympics.
