= Vladimír Vačkář =

Czech cyclist

Personal information
- Born: 6 February 1949 (age 77) Prostějov, Czechoslovakia

Cycling career
- Sport: Cycling

Vladimír Vačkář (born 6 February 1949) is a former Czech cyclist. He competed in the sprint event at the 1972 Summer Olympics.
