= Günther Schumacher =

German cyclist

Personal information
- Born: 27 July 1949 (age 77) Rostock, Soviet occupation zone of Germany

Cycling career
- Sport: Cycling
Medal record
Men's cycling
Representing West Germany
Olympic Games
Gold medal – first place	1972 Munich	Team Pursuit
Gold medal – first place	1976 Montreal	Team Pursuit
Track World Championships
Silver medal – second place	1977 San Cristóbal	1 km time trial

Günther Schumacher (born 27 June 1949) is a retired track cyclist and road bicycle racer born in East Germany, who was a professional rider from 1977 to 1984. He twice represented West Germany at the Summer Olympics (1972 and 1976), and won the gold medal on both occasions in the Men's Team Pursuit.

== Teams ==
- 1977: Citizen (West Germany)
- 1978: Citizen (West Germany)
- 1979: Citizen (West Germany)
- 1980: Citizen (West Germany)
- 1981: Kotter (West Germany)
- 1982: Unknown
- 1983: Unknown
- 1984: Unknown
