= Antigua and Barbuda at the 1984 Summer Olympics =

- IOC code: ANT
- NOC: Antigua and Barbuda National Olympic Committee

in Los Angeles
- Competitors: 14 (10 men, 4 women) in 3 sports
- Flag bearer: Lester Benjamin
- Medals: Gold 0 Silver 0 Bronze 0 Total 0

Summer Olympics appearances (overview)
- 1976; 1980; 1984; 1988; 1992; 1996; 2000; 2004; 2008; 2012; 2016; 2020; 2024; 2028

Antigua and Barbuda competed at the 1984 Summer Olympics in Los Angeles, United States. The nation returned to the Olympic Games after participating in the American-led boycott of the 1980 Summer Olympics. Fourteen competitors, ten men and four women, took part in seventeen events in three sports.

== Athletics ==
Men
Track & road events

Athlete	Event	Heat		Quarterfinal		Semifinal		Final	
Athlete	Event	Result	Rank	Result	Rank	Result	Rank	Result	Rank
Alfred Browne	400 m	47.29	5	did not advance					
Anthony Henry	100 m	10.99	7	did not advance					
Dale Jones	800 m	1:51.52	6	did not advance					
Dale Jones	1500 m	3:55.65	7	did not advance					
Larry Miller	200 m	21.93	6	did not advance					
Anthony Henry; Lester Benjamin; Alfred Browne; Larry Miller	4 × 100 m relay	40.70	5	did not advance					
Alfred Browne; Larry Miller; Howard Lindsay; Dale Jones	4 × 400 m relay	3:10.95	5	did not advance					

Field events

Athlete	Event	Qualification		Final	
Athlete	Event	Distance	Position	Distance	Position
Lester Benjamin	Long jump	7.57	15	did not advance	

Women
Track & road events

Athlete	Event	Heat		Quarterfinal		Semifinal		Final	
Athlete	Event	Result	Rank	Result	Rank	Result	Rank	Result	Rank
Laverne Bryan	800 m	2:11.44	6	did not advance					
Laverne Bryan	1500 m	4:32.44	11	did not advance					
Ruperta Charles	100 m	12.04	7	did not advance					
Jocelyn Joseph	400 m	53.63	7	did not advance					
Jocelyn Joseph; Ruperta Charles; Monica Stevens; Laverne Bryan	4 × 400 m relay	3:39.32	4	did not advance					

== Cycling ==
Three cyclists represented Antigua and Barbuda in 1984.

=== Track ===
1000m time trial

Athlete	Event	Time	Rank
Leon Richardson	Men's 1000m time trial	DNF	

Men's Sprint

Athlete	Event	Round 1	Repechage 1	Round 2	Repechage 2	Repechage Finals	Quarterfinals	Semifinals	Final	
Athlete	Event	Time Speed (km/h)	Rank	Opposition Time Speed (km/h)	Opposition Time Speed (km/h)	Opposition Time Speed (km/h)	Opposition Time Speed (km/h)	Opposition Time Speed (km/h)	Opposition Time Speed (km/h)	Rank
Brian Lyn	Men's sprint	Sella (ITA); Steele (NZL); L	Sakamoto (JPN); L 11,35	Jamur (BRA); Joseph (GUY); L	did not advance					25
Leon Richardson	Men's sprint	Gorski (USA); L 10,87	Iannone (ARG); L 11,51	Rainsford (AUS); Heinz Isler (SUI); L	did not advance					27

Omnium

Athlete	Event	Qualification		Final	
Athlete	Event	Score	Rank	Score	Rank
Elisha Hughes	Points race	DNF		did not advance	

== Sailing ==
Men

Athlete	Event	Race							Score	Rank
Athlete	Event	1	2	3	4	5	6	7	Score	Rank
Inigo Ross	Windglider	28	29	26	~~34~~	27	29	30	205	30

== See also ==
- Antigua and Barbuda at the 1983 Pan American Games
