= UCI Track Cycling World Championships – Men's tandem =

The UCI Track Cycling World Championships – Men's tandem is the defunct world championship tandem event that was held annually at the UCI Track Cycling World Championships between 1966 and 1994. Czechoslovakia won with 9 titles the most times.

At the 1900 championships a tandem event was organized. This race has never been officially recognized. The Dutch duo Harrie Meyers-Fernando Tomaselli won ahead of the French duo Edmond Jacquelin-Lucien Louvet and the French-American duo Charles Vanoni-Robert Protin. Because the race was not official the medalists are not listed here.

== Medalists ==
Championships	Gold	Silver	Bronze
1966	France; Pierre Trentin; Daniel Morelon	West Germany; Klaus Kobusch; Martin Stenzel	Italy; Walter Gorini; Giordano Turrini
1967	Italy; Bruno Gonzato; Dino Verzini	France; Pierre Trentin; Daniel Morelon	Belgium; Daniel Goens; Robert Van Lancker
1968	Italy; Giordano Turrini; Walter Gorini	Belgium; Daniel Goens; Robert Van Lancker	Japan; Sanji Inoue; Hideo Madarame
1969	East Germany; Hans-Jürgen Geschke; Werner Otto	West Germany; Jürgen Barth; Rainer Muller	France; Pierre Trentin; Daniel Morelon
1970	West Germany; Jürgen Barth; Rainer Muller	East Germany; Hans-Jürgen Geschke; Werner Otto	France; Gérard Quintyn; Daniel Morelon
1971	East Germany; Hans-Jürgen Geschke; Werner Otto	West Germany; Jürgen Barth; Rainer Muller	France; Pierre Trentin; Daniel Morelon
1972	Not held		
1973	Czechoslovakia; Vladimír Vačkář; Miroslav Vymazal	Soviet Union; Viktor Kopylov; Vladimir Semenets	East Germany; Hans-Jürgen Geschke; Werner Otto
1974	Czechoslovakia; Vladimír Vačkář; Miroslav Vymazal	Soviet Union; Viktor Kopylov; Vladimir Semenets	Poland; Benedykt Kocot; Andrzej Bek
1975	~~Poland~~; ~~Benedykt Kocot~~; ~~Janusz Kotlinski~~	Czechoslovakia; Vladimír Vačkář; Miroslav Vymazal	Soviet Union; Anatoly Iablunowsky; Sergei Komelkov
1976	Poland; Benedykt Kocot; Janusz Kotlinski	Czechoslovakia; Ivan Kučírek; Miloš Jelínek	Soviet Union; Anatoly Iablunowsky; Vladimir Semenets
1977	Czechoslovakia; Vladimír Vačkář; Miroslav Vymazal	Soviet Union; Vladimir Semenets; Aleksander Voronine	East Germany; Horst Gewis; Wolfgang Schaffer
1978	Czechoslovakia; Vladimír Vačkář; Miroslav Vymazal	United States; Gerald Ash; Leslie Darcewski	Netherlands; Sjaak Pieters; Laurens Veldt
1979	France; Yavé Cahard; Franck Depine	West Germany; Dieter Giebken; Fredy Schmidtke	Czechoslovakia; Vladimír Vačkář; Miroslav Vymazal
1980	Czechoslovakia; Ivan Kučírek; Pavel Martínek	France; Cloarec Yvon; Depine Franck	Italy; Giorgio Rossi; Floriano Finamore
1981	Czechoslovakia; Ivan Kučírek; Pavel Martínek	West Germany; Dieter Giebken; Fredy Schmidtke	Poland; Ryszard Konkolewski; Zbigniew Piątek
1982	Czechoslovakia; Ivan Kučírek; Pavel Martínek	West Germany; Dieter Giebken; Fredy Schmidtke	Netherlands; Sjaak Pieters; Tom Vrolijk
1983	France; Philippe Vernet; Franck Depine	Czechoslovakia; Ivan Kučírek; Pavel Martínek	~~West Germany~~; ~~Dieter Giebken~~; ~~Fredy Schmidtke~~
1984	West Germany; Franck Weber; Jürgen Greil	France; Philippe Vernet; Franck Depine	Italy; Vincenzo Ceci; Gabriele Sella
1985	Czechoslovakia; Vítězslav Vobořil; Roman Řehounek	United States; Nelson Vails; Leslie Darcewski	West Germany; Sascha Allscheid; Franck Weber
1986	Czechoslovakia; Vítězslav Vobořil; Roman Řehounek	United States; Kit Kyle; David Lindsey	Italy; Andrea Faccini; Roberto Nicotti
1987	France; Fabrice Colas; Frédéric Magné	Italy; Andrea Faccini; Roberto Nicotti	Czechoslovakia; Vítězslav Vobořil; Lubomír Hargaš
1988	France; Fabrice Colas; Frédéric Magné	West Germany; Greil Hans-Jürgen; Uwe Butchmann	Czechoslovakia; Jiří Illek; Lubomír Hargaš
1989	France; Fabrice Colas; Frédéric Magné	Czechoslovakia; Jiří Illek; Lubomír Hargaš	Italy; Andrea Faccini; Federico Paris
1990	Italy; Gianluca Capitano; Federico Paris	Japan; Norihira Inamura; Masaru Saito	West Germany; Uwe Butchmann; Markus Nagel
1991	Germany; Emanuel Raasch; Eyk Pokorny	Czechoslovakia; Lubomir Hargas; Pavel Buráň	France; Frédéric Lancien; Denis Lemyre
1992	Italy; Gianluca Capitano; Federico Paris	Czechoslovakia; Lubomír Hargaš; Pavel Buráň	Australia; Anthony Peden; David Dew
1993	Italy; Federico Paris; Roberto Chiappa	Australia; Stephen Pate; Dany Day	Czechoslovakia; Arnošt Drcmánek; Lubomír Hargaš
1994	France; Fabrice Colas; Frédéric Magné	Germany; Emanuel Raasch; Jens Glücklich	Italy; Federico Paris; Roberto Chiappa
