= Cycling at the 1984 Summer Olympics – Men's sprint =

Men's sprint at the Games of the XXIII Olympiad
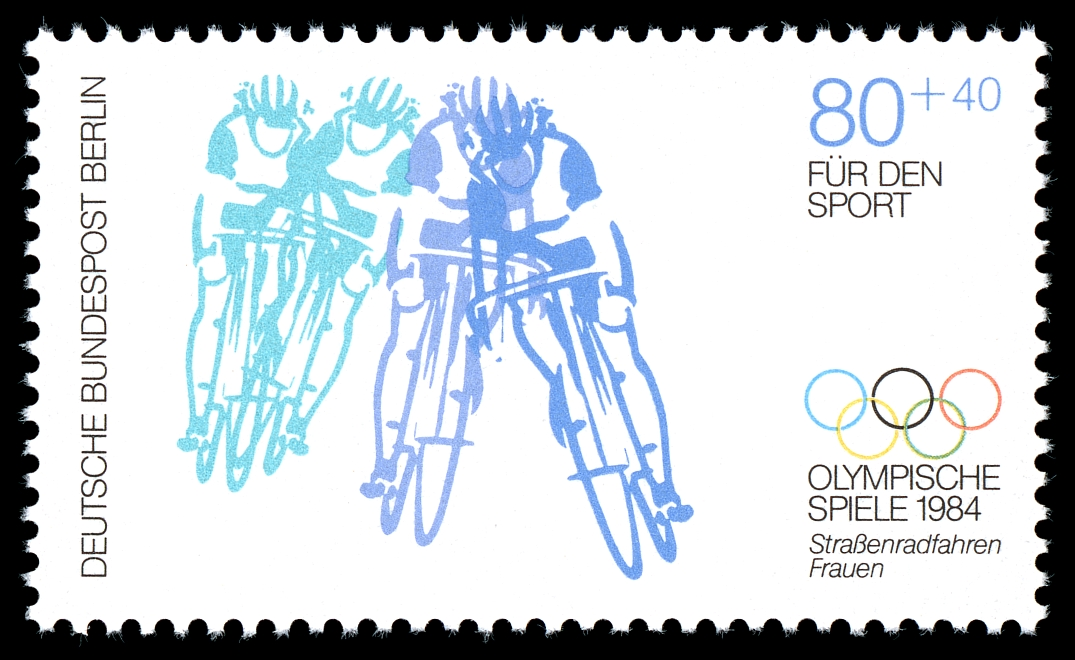
- German stamp commemorating 1984 Olympic cycling
- Venue: Olympic Velodrome, Los Angeles
- Dates: 31 July-3 August
- Competitors: 34 from 24 nations

Medalists
| 1st place, gold medalist(s) | | Mark Gorski; United States |
| 2nd place, silver medalist(s) | | Nelson Vails; United States |
| 3rd place, bronze medalist(s) | | Tsutomu Sakamoto; Japan |

The men's sprint cycling event at the 1984 Summer Olympics took place from 31 July to 3 August and was one of eight cycling events at the 1984 Olympics. Once again, the limit on cyclists per nation was raised to 2 (it had been 1 from 1928 to 1956, 2 from 1960 to 1972, and 1 again in 1976 and 1980). The event was won by Mark Gorski of the United States, the nation's first victory in the men's sprint and first medal in the event since John Henry Lake took bronze in 1900. The final was all-American, as Nelson Vails took silver, becoming the first Olympic cycling medalist of African descent. Japan earned its first medal in the men's sprint with Tsutomu Sakamoto's bronze. France's five-Games podium streak in the event ended.

== Background ==
This was the 18th appearance of the event, which has been held at every Summer Olympics except 1904 and 1912. The two returning quarterfinalists from 1980 were sixth-place finisher Heinz Isler of Switzerland and seventh-place finisher Kenrick Tucker of Australia. The Soviet-led boycott was particularly disruptive in this event, with the East German team dominant at the time. In particular, Lutz Heßlich was the best sprinter in the world for most of the 1980s and would have had a strong opportunity for three straight gold medals if not for the boycott; he had won the 1979 and 1983 World Championships and the 1980 Olympic gold, and would go on to win the 1985 and 1987 World Championships and the 1988 Olympic gold. The 1981 and 1982 World Champion and 1980 Olympic bronze medalist, Soviet Sergei Kopylov, was also kept out due to the boycott. Of the nations that were competing in Los Angeles, the host Americans were favored. Mark Gorski had beaten Kopylov multiple times in 1983. Nelson Vails was also a top contender.

The Cayman Islands and Chinese Taipei each made their debut in the men's sprint. France made its 18th appearance, the only nation to have competed at every appearance of the event.

== Competition format ==
This sprint competition involved a series of head-to-head matches. With a larger field due to allowing two cyclists per nation instead of just one, the competition ballooned to 11 rounds: six main rounds and three repechages, two of which were two-round repechages.

- Round 1: The 34 entrants were divided into 12 heats, most with 3 cyclists but a few with 2 (including one heat that was reduced to 2 by a withdrawal). The winner of each heat advanced directly to round 2 (12 cyclists), while all other cyclists who competed were sent to the first repechage semifinals (21 cyclists).
- First repechage semifinals: The 21 cyclists were divided into 8 heats, each with 2 or 3 cyclists. The winner of each heat advanced to round 2 (8 cyclists), while the remaining cyclists went to the first repechage finals (13 cyclists).
- First repechage finals: The 13 cyclists were divided into 4 heats, with 3 or 4 cyclists each. The winner of each heat advanced to round 2 (4 cyclists), with all others eliminated (9 cyclists).
- Round 2: The 24 cyclists were divided into 12 heats of 2 cyclists each. The winner of each heat advanced to the 1/8 finals (12 cyclists) while losers went to the second repechage (12 cyclists).
- Second repechage: The 12 cyclists competed in 6 heats of 2 cyclists. Winners advanced to the 1/8 finals, losers were eliminated.
- 1/8 finals: The 18 remaining cyclists competed in a 1/8 finals round. There were 6 heats in this round, with 3 cyclists in each. The top cyclist in each heat advanced to the quarterfinals (6 cyclists), while the remaining two in each heat went to the third repechage semifinals (12 cyclists).
- Third repechage semifinals: This round featured 4 heats, with 3 cyclists each. The winner of each heat advanced to the third repechage finals (4 cyclists); the others were eliminated (8 cyclists).
- Third repechage finals: The 4 cyclists advancing to this round were divided into 2 heats of 2 cyclists each. The winners advanced to the quarterfinals while the losers were eliminated.
- Quarterfinals: Beginning with the quarterfinals, all matches were one-on-one competitions and were held in best-of-three format. There were 4 quarterfinals, with the winner of each advancing to the semifinals and the loser going to the fifth-eighth classification race.
- Semifinals: The two semifinals provided for advancement to the gold medal final for winners and to the bronze medal final for losers.
- Finals: Both a gold medal final and a bronze medal final were held, as well as a classification final for fifth through eighth places for quarterfinal losers.

== Records ==
The records for the sprint are 200 metre flying time trial records, kept for the qualifying round in later Games as well as for the finish of races.

| World record | Omar Pkhakadze (URS) | 10.61 | Mexico City, Mexico | 22 October 1967 |
| Olympic record | Sergei Kopylov (URS) | 10.47 | Moscow, Soviet Union | 26 July 1980 |

No new world or Olympic records were set during the competition.

== Schedule ==
All times are Pacific Daylight Time (UTC-7)

| Date | Time | Round |
|---|---|---|
| Tuesday, 31 July 1984 | 10:00; 12:00; 12:15; 12:30; 12:45 | Round 1 First repechage semifinals First repechage finals Round 2 Second repechage |
| Wednesday, 1 August 1984 | 10:30; 11:00; 11:30; 12:00 | 1/8 finals Third repechage semifinals Third repechage finals Quarterfinals |
| Thursday, 2 August 1984 | 10:00 | Semifinals |
| Friday, 3 August 1984 | 14:00 | Finals |

== Results ==
=== Round 1 ===
==== Round 1 heat 1 ====
| Rank | Cyclist | Nation | Time 200 m | Notes |
|---|---|---|---|---|
| 1 | Mark Gorski | United States | 10.87 | Q |
| 2 | Leon Richardson | Antigua and Barbuda | | R |

==== Round 1 heat 2 ====
| Rank | Cyclist | Nation | Time 200 m | Notes |
|---|---|---|---|---|
| 1 | Marcelo Alexandre | Argentina | 11.87 | Q |
| 2 | Tsutomu Sakamoto | Japan | | R |

==== Round 1 heat 3 ====
| Rank | Cyclist | Nation | Time 200 m | Notes |
|---|---|---|---|---|
| 1 | Katsuo Nakatake | Japan | 11.92 | Q |
| 2 | Charles Pile | Barbados | | R |
| 3 | Paulo Jamur | Brazil | | R |

==== Round 1 heat 4 ====
| Rank | Cyclist | Nation | Time 200 m | Notes |
|---|---|---|---|---|
| 1 | Gabriele Sella | Italy | 11.54 | Q |
| 2 | Brian Lyn | Antigua and Barbuda | | R |
| 3 | Murray Steele | New Zealand | | R |

==== Round 1 heat 5 ====
| Rank | Cyclist | Nation | Time 200 m | Notes |
|---|---|---|---|---|
| 1 | Philippe Vernet | France | 11.31 | Q |
| 2 | Claudio Iannone | Argentina | | R |
| 3 | Deogracias Asuncion | Philippines | | R |

==== Round 1 heat 6 ====
| Rank | Cyclist | Nation | Time 200 m | Notes |
|---|---|---|---|---|
| 1 | Gerhard Scheller | West Germany | 11.29 | Q |
| 2 | Ian Stanley | Jamaica | | R |
| 3 | Ernest Moodie | Cayman Islands | | R |

==== Round 1 heat 7 ====
| Rank | Cyclist | Nation | Time 200 m | Notes |
|---|---|---|---|---|
| 1 | Mark Barry | Great Britain | 11.84 | Q |
| 2 | James Joseph | Guyana | | R |
| 3 | Gene Samuel | Trinidad and Tobago | | R |

==== Round 1 heat 8 ====
| Rank | Cyclist | Nation | Time 200 m | Notes |
|---|---|---|---|---|
| 1 | Nelson Vails | United States | 11.07 | Q |
| 2 | José Antonio Urquijo | Chile | | R |
| 3 | Kenrick Tucker | Australia | | R |

==== Round 1 heat 9 ====
| Rank | Cyclist | Nation | Time 200 m | Notes |
|---|---|---|---|---|
| 1 | Franck Dépine | France | 11.49 | Q |
| 2 | Hugo Daya | Colombia | | R |
| 3 | Max Rainsford | Australia | | R |

==== Round 1 heat 10 ====
| Rank | Cyclist | Nation | Time 200 m | Notes |
|---|---|---|---|---|
| 1 | Vincenzo Ceci | Italy | 12.01 | Q |
| 2 | Heinz Isler | Switzerland | | R |
| 3 | Rodolfo Guaves | Philippines | | R |

==== Round 1 heat 11 ====
| Rank | Cyclist | Nation | Time 200 m | Notes |
|---|---|---|---|---|
| 1 | Alex Ongaro | Canada | 11.43 | Q |
| 2 | Lee Fu-hsiang | Chinese Taipei | | R |
| — | Rolf Morgan Hansen | Norway | DNS | |

==== Round 1 heat 12 ====
| Rank | Cyclist | Nation | Time 200 m | Notes |
|---|---|---|---|---|
| 1 | Fredy Schmidtke | West Germany | 11.80 | Q |
| 2 | Frank Orban | Belgium | | R |
| 3 | Rosman Alwi | Malaysia | | R |

=== First repêchage semifinals ===
==== First repechage semifinal 1 ====
| Rank | Cyclist | Nation | Time 200 m | Notes |
|---|---|---|---|---|
| 1 | Tsutomu Sakamoto | Japan | 11.35 | Q |
| 2 | Brian Lyn | Antigua and Barbuda | | R |

==== First repechage semifinal 2 ====
| Rank | Cyclist | Nation | Time 200 m | Notes |
|---|---|---|---|---|
| 1 | Murray Steele | New Zealand | 12.09 | Q |
| 2 | Deogracias Asuncion | Philippines | | R |

==== First repechage semifinal 3 ====
| Rank | Cyclist | Nation | Time 200 m | Notes |
|---|---|---|---|---|
| 1 | Claudio Iannone | Argentina | 11.51 | Q |
| 2 | Leon Richardson | Antigua and Barbuda | | R |

==== First repechage semifinal 4 ====
| Rank | Cyclist | Nation | Time 200 m | Notes |
|---|---|---|---|---|
| 1 | José Antonio Urquijo | Chile | 11.64 | Q |
| 2 | Ian Stanley | Jamaica | | R |
| 3 | Charles Pile | Barbados | | R |

==== First repechage semifinal 5 ====
| Rank | Cyclist | Nation | Time 200 m | Notes |
|---|---|---|---|---|
| 1 | Gene Samuel | Trinidad and Tobago | 11.89 | Q |
| 2 | Paulo Jamur | Brazil | | R |
| 3 | Ernest Moodie | Cayman Islands | | R |

==== First repechage semifinal 6 ====
| Rank | Cyclist | Nation | Time 200 m | Notes |
|---|---|---|---|---|
| 1 | Kenrick Tucker | Australia | 11.23 | Q |
| 2 | Hugo Daya | Colombia | | R |
| 3 | James Joseph | Guyana | | R |

==== First repechage semifinal 7 ====
| Rank | Cyclist | Nation | Time 200 m | Notes |
|---|---|---|---|---|
| 1 | Frank Orban | Belgium | 11.53 | Q |
| 2 | Lee Fu-hsiang | Chinese Taipei | | R |
| 3 | Heinz Isler | Switzerland | | R |

==== First repechage semifinal 8 ====
| Rank | Cyclist | Nation | Time 200 m | Notes |
|---|---|---|---|---|
| 1 | Rosman Alwi | Malaysia | 11.58 | Q |
| 2 | Max Rainsford | Australia | | R |
| 3 | Rodolfo Guaves | Philippines | | R |

=== First repêchage finals ===
==== First repechage final 1 ====
| Rank | Cyclist | Nation | Time 200 m | Notes |
|---|---|---|---|---|
| 1 | Paulo Jamur | Brazil | 11.92 | Q |
| 2 | Brian Lyn | Antigua and Barbuda | | |
| 3 | James Joseph | Guyana | | |

==== First repechage final 2 ====
| Rank | Cyclist | Nation | Time 200 m | Notes |
|---|---|---|---|---|
| 1 | Charles Pile | Barbados | 11.51 | Q |
| 2 | Deogracias Asuncion | Philippines | | |
| 3 | Ernest Moodie | Cayman Islands | | |

==== First repechage final 3 ====
| Rank | Cyclist | Nation | Time 200 m | Notes |
|---|---|---|---|---|
| 1 | Max Rainsford | Australia | 11.79 | Q |
| 2 | Leon Richardson | Antigua and Barbuda | | |
| 3 | Heinz Isler | Switzerland | | |

==== First repechage final 4 ====
| Rank | Cyclist | Nation | Time 200 m | Notes |
|---|---|---|---|---|
| 1 | Lee Fu-hsiang | Chinese Taipei | 11.90 | Q |
| 2 | Hugo Daya | Colombia | | |
| 3 | Rodolfo Guaves | Philippines | | |
| 4 | Ian Stanley | Jamaica | | |

=== Round 2 ===
==== Round 2 heat 1 ====
| Rank | Cyclist | Nation | Time 200 m | Notes |
|---|---|---|---|---|
| 1 | Mark Gorski | United States | 10.79 | Q |
| 2 | Paulo Jamur | Brazil | | R |

==== Round 2 heat 2 ====
| Rank | Cyclist | Nation | Time 200 m | Notes |
|---|---|---|---|---|
| 1 | Marcelo Alexandre | Argentina | 12.68 | Q |
| 2 | Max Rainsford | Australia | | R |

==== Round 2 heat 3 ====
| Rank | Cyclist | Nation | Time 200 m | Notes |
|---|---|---|---|---|
| 1 | Katsuo Nakatake | Japan | 12.05 | Q |
| 2 | Lee Fu-hsiang | Chinese Taipei | | R |

==== Round 2 heat 4 ====
| Rank | Cyclist | Nation | Time 200 m | Notes |
|---|---|---|---|---|
| 1 | Gabriele Sella | Italy | 11.16 | Q |
| 2 | Charles Pile | Barbados | | R |

==== Round 2 heat 5 ====
| Rank | Cyclist | Nation | Time 200 m | Notes |
|---|---|---|---|---|
| 1 | Philippe Vernet | France | 10.94 | Q |
| 2 | Rosman Alwi | Malaysia | | R |

==== Round 2 heat 6 ====
| Rank | Cyclist | Nation | Time 200 m | Notes |
|---|---|---|---|---|
| 1 | Fredy Schmidtke | West Germany | 11.36 | Q |
| 2 | Kenrick Tucker | Australia | | R |

==== Round 2 heat 7 ====
| Rank | Cyclist | Nation | Time 200 m | Notes |
|---|---|---|---|---|
| 1 | Frank Orban | Belgium | 11.33 | Q |
| 2 | Mark Barry | Great Britain | | R |

==== Round 2 heat 8 ====
| Rank | Cyclist | Nation | Time 200 m | Notes |
|---|---|---|---|---|
| 1 | Nelson Vails | United States | 10.80 | Q |
| 2 | Gene Samuel | Trinidad and Tobago | | R |

==== Round 2 heat 9 ====
| Rank | Cyclist | Nation | Time 200 m | Notes |
|---|---|---|---|---|
| 1 | Claudio Iannone | Argentina | 11.79 | Q |
| 2 | Franck Dépine | France | | R |

==== Round 2 heat 10 ====
| Rank | Cyclist | Nation | Time 200 m | Notes |
|---|---|---|---|---|
| 1 | Vincenzo Ceci | Italy | 11.52 | Q |
| 2 | José Antonio Urquijo | Chile | | R |

==== Round 2 heat 11 ====
| Rank | Cyclist | Nation | Time 200 m | Notes |
|---|---|---|---|---|
| 1 | Tsutomu Sakamoto | Japan | 11.07 | Q |
| 2 | Alex Ongaro | Canada | | R |

==== Round 2 heat 12 ====
| Rank | Cyclist | Nation | Time 200 m | Notes |
|---|---|---|---|---|
| 1 | Gerhard Scheller | West Germany | 11.11 | Q |
| 2 | Murray Steele | New Zealand | | R |

=== Second repêchage ===
==== Second repechage heat 1 ====
| Rank | Cyclist | Nation | Time 200 m | Notes |
|---|---|---|---|---|
| 1 | Alex Ongaro | Canada | 11.23 | Q |
| 2 | Max Rainsford | Australia | | |

==== Second repechage heat 2 ====
| Rank | Cyclist | Nation | Time 200 m | Notes |
|---|---|---|---|---|
| 1 | Murray Steele | New Zealand | 11.92 | Q |
| 2 | Paulo Jamur | Brazil | | |

==== Second repechage heat 3 ====
| Rank | Cyclist | Nation | Time 200 m | Notes |
|---|---|---|---|---|
| 1 | Lee Fu-hsiang | Chinese Taipei | 11.58 | Q |
| 2 | José Antonio Urquijo | Chile | | |

==== Second repechage heat 4 ====
| Rank | Cyclist | Nation | Time 200 m | Notes |
|---|---|---|---|---|
| 1 | Franck Dépine | France | 11.62 | Q |
| 2 | Charles Pile | Barbados | | |

==== Second repechage heat 5 ====
| Rank | Cyclist | Nation | Time 200 m | Notes |
|---|---|---|---|---|
| 1 | Mark Barry | Great Britain | 11.64 | Q |
| 2 | Rosman Alwi | Malaysia | | |

==== Second repechage heat 6 ====
| Rank | Cyclist | Nation | Time 200 m | Notes |
|---|---|---|---|---|
| 1 | Kenrick Tucker | West Germany | 11.46 | Q |
| 2 | Gene Samuel | New Zealand | | |

=== 1/8 finals ===
==== 1/8 final 1 ====
| Rank | Cyclist | Nation | Time 200 m | Notes |
|---|---|---|---|---|
| 1 | Mark Gorski | United States | 10.89 | Q |
| 2 | Claudio Iannone | Argentina | | R |
| 3 | Alex Ongaro | Canada | | R |

==== 1/8 final 2 ====
The second resulted in an appeal that determined all three riders were at fault. Ceci was relegated to the repechage, while Alexandre and Lee re-ran the heat.

Original

| Rank | Cyclist | Nation | Time 200 m | Notes |
|---|---|---|---|---|
| — | Marcelo Alexandre | Argentina | | Re-run |
| — | Lee Fu-hsiang | Chinese Taipei | | Re-run |
| — | Vincenzo Ceci | Italy | | R |

Re-run

| Rank | Cyclist | Nation | Time 200 m | Notes |
|---|---|---|---|---|
| 1 | Marcelo Alexandre | Argentina | 12.30 | Q |
| 2 | Lee Fu-hsiang | Chinese Taipei | | R |

==== 1/8 final 3 ====
| Rank | Cyclist | Nation | Time 200 m | Notes |
|---|---|---|---|---|
| 1 | Kenrick Tucker | Australia | 11.58 | Q |
| 2 | Gerhard Scheller | West Germany | | R |
| 3 | Katsuo Nakatake | Japan | | R |

==== 1/8 final 4 ====
| Rank | Cyclist | Nation | Time 200 m | Notes |
|---|---|---|---|---|
| 1 | Tsutomu Sakamoto | Japan | 11.31 | Q |
| 2 | Gabriele Sella | Italy | | R |
| 3 | Franck Dépine | France | | R |

==== 1/8 final 5 ====
| Rank | Cyclist | Nation | Time 200 m | Notes |
|---|---|---|---|---|
| 1 | Philippe Vernet | France | 11.33 | Q |
| 2 | Murray Steele | New Zealand | | R |
| 3 | Frank Orban | Belgium | | R |

==== 1/8 final 6 ====
| Rank | Cyclist | Nation | Time 200 m | Notes |
|---|---|---|---|---|
| 1 | Nelson Vails | United States | 11.05 | Q |
| 2 | Fredy Schmidtke | West Germany | | R |
| 3 | Mark Barry | Great Britain | | R |

=== Third repêchage semifinals ===
==== Third repechage semifinal 1 ====
| Rank | Cyclist | Nation | Time 200 m | Notes |
|---|---|---|---|---|
| 1 | Gerhard Scheller | West Germany | | Q |
| 2 | Claudio Iannone | Argentina | | |
| 3 | Murray Steele | New Zealand | | |

==== Third repechage semifinal 2 ====
| Rank | Cyclist | Nation | Time 200 m | Notes |
|---|---|---|---|---|
| 1 | Lee Fu-hsiang | Chinese Taipei | 11.67 | Q |
| 2 | Katsuo Nakatake | Japan | | |
| 3 | Mark Barry | Great Britain | | |

==== Third repechage semifinal 3 ====
| Rank | Cyclist | Nation | Time 200 m | Notes |
|---|---|---|---|---|
| 1 | Gabriele Sella | Italy | 11.58 | Q |
| 2 | Frank Orban | Belgium | | |
| 3 | Alex Ongaro | Canada | | |

==== Third repechage semifinal 4 ====
| Rank | Cyclist | Nation | Time 200 m | Notes |
|---|---|---|---|---|
| 1 | Fredy Schmidtke | West Germany | 11.45 | Q |
| 2 | Franck Dépine | France | | |
| 3 | Vincenzo Ceci | Italy | | |

=== Third repêchage finals ===
==== Third repechage final 1 ====
| Rank | Cyclist | Nation | Time 200 m | Notes |
|---|---|---|---|---|
| 1 | Gerhard Scheller | West Germany | 11.52 | Q |
| 2 | Gabriele Sella | Italy | | |

==== Third repechage final 2 ====
| Rank | Cyclist | Nation | Time 200 m | Notes |
|---|---|---|---|---|
| 1 | Fredy Schmidtke | West Germany | 10.96 | Q |
| 2 | Lee Fu-hsiang | Chinese Taipei | | |

=== Quarterfinals ===
==== Quarterfinal 1 ====
| Rank | Cyclist | Nation | Race 1 | Race 2 | Race 3 | Notes |
|---|---|---|---|---|---|---|
| 1 | Mark Gorski | United States | 11.65 | 11.08 | — | Q |
| 2 | Gerhard Scheller | West Germany | | | — | C |

==== Quarterfinal 2 ====
| Rank | Cyclist | Nation | Race 1 | Race 2 | Race 3 | Notes |
|---|---|---|---|---|---|---|
| 1 | Philippe Vernet | France | 11.56 | 11.17 | — | Q |
| 2 | Fredy Schmidtke | West Germany | | | — | C |

==== Quarterfinal 3 ====
| Rank | Cyclist | Nation | Race 1 | Race 2 | Race 3 | Notes |
|---|---|---|---|---|---|---|
| 1 | Nelson Vails | United States | 11.33 | 12.07 | — | Q |
| 2 | Marcelo Alexandre | Argentina | | | — | C |

==== Quarterfinal 4 ====
| Rank | Cyclist | Nation | Race 1 | Race 2 | Race 3 | Notes |
|---|---|---|---|---|---|---|
| 1 | Tsutomu Sakamoto | Japan | 11.20 | | 11.26 | Q |
| 2 | Kenrick Tucker | Australia | | 11.51 | | C |

=== Semifinals ===
==== Semifinal 1 ====
| Rank | Cyclist | Nation | Race 1 | Race 2 | Race 3 | Notes |
|---|---|---|---|---|---|---|
| 1 | Mark Gorski | United States | 11.17 | 10.74 | — | Q |
| 2 | Tsutomu Sakamoto | Japan | | | — | B |

==== Semifinal 2 ====
| Rank | Cyclist | Nation | Race 1 | Race 2 | Race 3 | Notes |
|---|---|---|---|---|---|---|
| 1 | Nelson Vails | United States | 10.93 | 10.86 | — | Q |
| 2 | Philippe Vernet | France | | | — | B |

=== Finals ===
==== Classification 5–8 ====
| Rank | Cyclist | Nation | Time 200 m |
|---|---|---|---|
| 5 | Gerhard Scheller | West Germany | 11.36 |
| 6 | Marcelo Alexandre | Argentina | |
| 7 | Kenrick Tucker | Australia | |
| 8 | Fredy Schmidtke | West Germany | |

==== Bronze medal match ====
| Rank | Cyclist | Nation | Race 1 | Race 2 | Race 3 |
|---|---|---|---|---|---|
| 3rd place, bronze medalist(s) | Tsutomu Sakamoto | Japan | 11.06 | 11.03 | — |
| 4 | Philippe Vernet | France | | | — |

==== Final ====
| Rank | Cyclist | Nation | Race 1 | Race 2 | Race 3 |
|---|---|---|---|---|---|
| 1st place, gold medalist(s) | Mark Gorski | United States | 10.49 | 10.95 | — |
| 2nd place, silver medalist(s) | Nelson Vails | United States | | | — |
