= Cycling at the 1984 Summer Olympics – Men's track time trial =

Men's track time trial at the Games of the XXIII Olympiad
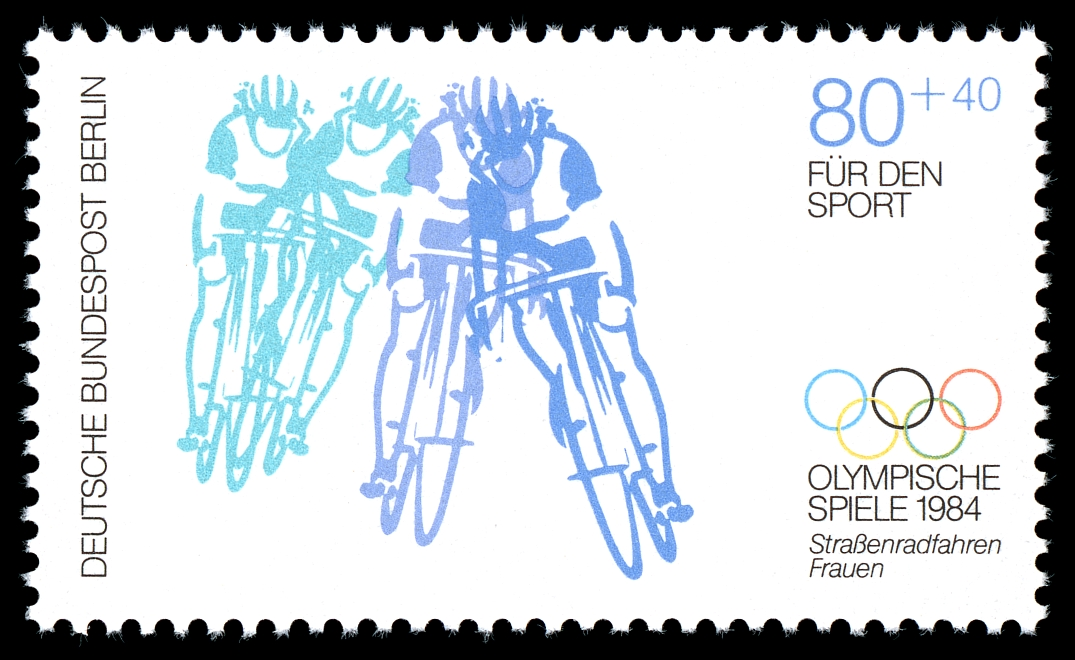
- German stamp commemorating 1984 Olympic cycling
- Venue: Olympic Velodrome, Los Angeles
- Date: 30 July
- Competitors: 25 from 25 nations
- Winning time: 1:06.10

Medalists
1st place, gold medalist(s)		Fredy Schmidtke; West Germany
2nd place, silver medalist(s)		Curt Harnett; Canada
3rd place, bronze medalist(s)		Fabrice Colas; France

The men's track time trial cycling event at the 1984 Summer Olympics took place on 30 July and was one of eight cycling events at the 1984 Olympics. There were 25 competitors from 25 nations, with each nation limited to one cyclist. Two other cyclists entered but did not start. The event was won by Fredy Schmidtke of West Germany, the nation's first victory in the men's track time trial and the third consecutive Games in which a German cyclist won (with East Germany victorious in 1976 and 1980). Curt Harnett earned Canada's first medal in the event with his silver, while France returned to the podium for the first time since 1968 with Fabrice Colas's bronze.

== Background ==
This was the 14th appearance of the event, which had previously been held in 1896 and every Games since 1928. It would be held every Games until being dropped from the programme after 2004. The returning cyclists from 1980 were bronze medalist David Weller of Jamaica and sixth-place finisher Heinz Isler of Switzerland. The Soviet-led boycott kept out defending Olympic champion Lothar Thoms of East Germany and reigning world champion Sergey Kopylov of the Soviet Union. The favorite among those competing was 1982 world champion Fredy Schmidtke.

The Cayman Islands and Chinese Taipei each made their debut in the men's track time trial. France and Great Britain each made their 14th appearance, having competed at every appearance of the event.

== Competition format ==
The event was a time trial on the track, with each cyclist competing separately to attempt to achieve the fastest time. Each cyclist raced one kilometre from a standing start.

== Records ==
The following were the world and Olympic records prior to the competition.

World record	Lothar Thoms (GDR)	1:02.955	Moscow, Soviet Union	22 July 1980
Olympic record	Lothar Thoms (GDR)	1:02.955	Moscow, Soviet Union	22 July 1980

No new world or Olympic records were set during the competition.

== Schedule ==
All times are Pacific Daylight Time (UTC-7)

Date	Time	Round
Monday, 30 July 1984	12:00	Final

== Results ==
Rank	Cyclist	Nation	Lap 1	Lap 2	Time
1st place, gold medalist(s)	Fredy Schmidtke	West Germany	23.67	44.00	1:06.10
2nd place, silver medalist(s)	Curt Harnett	Canada	23.78	44.02	1:06.44
3rd place, bronze medalist(s)	Fabrice Colas	France	24.10	44.11	1:06.65
4	Gene Samuel	Trinidad and Tobago	23.82	44.03	1:06.69
5	Craig Adair	New Zealand	24.82	45.19	1:06.96
6	David Weller	Jamaica	24.17	44.48	1:07.24
7	Marcelo Alexandre	Argentina	24.44	44.96	1:07.29
8	Rory O'Reilly	United States	24.07	44.45	1:07.39
9	Stefano Baudino	Italy	23.79	44.67	1:07.70
10	Heinz Isler	Switzerland	24.08	44.99	1:07.88
11	Rolf Morgan Hansen	Norway	24.42	45.30	1:07.94
12	Marcelo Greuel	Brazil	24.00	45.14	1:08.37
13	Tsutomu Sakamoto	Japan	24.31	45.52	1:08.87
14	Max Rainsford	Australia	25.36	46.28	1:08.96
15	Claus Rasmussen	Denmark	25.15	46.22	1:09.04
16	Max Leiva	Guatemala	25.15	46.41	1:09.36
17	Miguel Droguett	Chile	25.40	46.76	1:09.42
18	Mark Barry	Great Britain	24.10	45.92	1:09.54
19	Charles Pile	Barbados	25.13	46.51	1:10.56
20	Rosman Alwi	Malaysia	25.39	47.64	1:11.03
21	Paul Popp	Austria	26.05	47.61	1:11.10
22	Lee Fu-hsiang	Chinese Taipei	24.89	46.32	1:11.12
23	Rodolfo Guaves	Philippines	26.30	48.36	1:11.61
24	Ernest Moodie	Cayman Islands	26.97	50.06	1:16.91
—	Leon Richardson	Antigua and Barbuda	—		DNF
—	Gonzalez Carlos Garcia	Uruguay	—		DNS
—	Muharud Mukasa	Uganda	—		DNS
