= Cycling at the 1988 Summer Olympics – Men's track time trial =

Men's track time trial at the Games of the XXIV Olympiad
- Venue: Seoul Olympic Velodrome
- Date: 20 September
- Competitors: 30 from 30 nations
- Winning time: 1:04.499

Medalists
1st place, gold medalist(s)		Aleksandr Kirichenko; Soviet Union
2nd place, silver medalist(s)		Martin Vinnicombe; Australia
3rd place, bronze medalist(s)		Robert Lechner; West Germany

The men's track time trial cycling event at the 1988 Summer Olympics took place on 20 September and was one of the nine cycling events at the 1984 Olympics. There were 30 cyclists from 30 nations, with each nation limited to one competitor. The event was won by Aleksandr Kirichenko of the Soviet Union, the nation's first victory in the men's track time trial. Martin Vinnicombe's silver was Australia's first medal in the event since 1972, while Robert Lechner put West Germany on the podium for the second consecutive Games with his bronze.

== Background ==
This was the 15th appearance of the event, which had previously been held in 1896 and every Games since 1928. It would be held every Games until being dropped from the programme after 2004. The returning cyclists from 1980 were silver medalist Curt Harnett of Canada, fourth-place finisher Gene Samuel of Trinidad and Tobago, seventh-place finisher Marcelo Alexandre of Argentina, sixteenth-place finisher Max Leiva of Guatemala, twentieth-place finisher Rosman Alwi of Malaysia, and twenty-second-place finisher Lee Fu-hsiang of Chinese Taipei. The favorite was Australian Martin Vinnicombe, who had won the 1987 world championship after third and second-place finishes in 1985 and 1986. Other contestants included Maic Malchow of East Germany, who had set the world record in 1986.

Liechtenstein and Spain each made their debut in the men's track time trial. France made its 15th appearance, having competed at every appearance of the event. For the first time, Great Britain did not compete.

== Competition format ==
The event was a time trial on the track, with each cyclist competing separately to attempt to achieve the fastest time. Each cyclist raced one kilometre from a standing start.

== Records ==
The following were the world and Olympic records prior to the competition.

World record	Maic Malchow (GDR)	1:02.091	Colorado Springs, United States	28 August 1986
Olympic record	Lothar Thoms (GDR)	1:02.955	Moscow, Soviet Union	22 July 1980

No new world or Olympic records were set during the competition.

== Schedule ==
All times are Korea Standard Time adjusted for daylight savings (UTC+10)

Date	Time	Round
Tuesday, 20 September 1988	19:10	Final

== Results ==
Rank	Cyclist	Nation	Lap 1	Lap 2	Time	Speed (km/h)
1st place, gold medalist(s)	Aleksandr Kirichenko	Soviet Union	22.903	42.568	1:04.499	55.814
2nd place, silver medalist(s)	Martin Vinnicombe	Australia	23.388	43.037	1:04.784	55.569
3rd place, bronze medalist(s)	Robert Lechner	West Germany	23.195	43.296	1:05.114	55.287
4	Kenneth Røpke	Denmark	24.075	43.772	1:05.168	55.241
5	Bernardo González	Spain	24.163	43.690	1:05.281	55.146
6	Maic Malchow	East Germany	23.919	43.790	1:05.393	55.051
7	Tony Graham	New Zealand	24.726	44.512	1:05.744	54.757
8	Frédéric Magné	France	23.701	44.332	1:06.142	54.428
9	Rocco Travella	Switzerland	23.562	43.668	1:06.209	54.373
10	Clóvis Anderson	Brazil	23.796	44.380	1:06.282	54.313
11	Curt Harnett	Canada	23.486	44.042	1:06.291	54.306
12	Gene Samuel	Trinidad and Tobago	23.256	43.615	1:06.560	54.086
13	Marcelo Alexandre	Argentina	24.211	44.521	1:06.925	53.791
14	Bobby Livingston	United States	23.763	44.299	1:06.926	53.790
15	Eom Yeong-seop	South Korea	23.624	44.079	1:07.000	53.731
16	Hiroshi Toyooka	Japan	24.605	44.844	1:07.240	53.539
17	Mika Hämäläinen	Finland	24.630	45.039	1:07.384	53.425
18	Thierry Détant	Netherlands	24.208	44.772	1:07.555	53.289
19	Mario Pons	Ecuador	23.415	44.636	1:08.351	52.669
20	Gary Mandy	Zimbabwe	24.087	45.116	1:08.474	52.574
21	Peter Hermann	Liechtenstein	25.542	46.716	1:08.999	52.174
22	Lee Fu-hsiang	Chinese Taipei	24.591	45.557	1:09.024	52.155
23	Max Leiva	Guatemala	24.874	26.062	1:09.214	52.012
24	Roderick Chase	Barbados	24.168	45.709	1:09.994	51.432
25	Rosman Alwi	Malaysia	25.249	46.972	1:10.446	51.102
26	Bernardo Rimarim	Philippines	26.303	48.111	1:11.647	50.246
27	Jalil Eftekhari	Iran	25.169	47.302	1:11.683	50.221
28	Michele Smith	Cayman Islands	25.775	47.730	1:11.820	50.125
29	Bailón Becerra	Bolivia	25.087	47.967	1:13.513	48.970
30	Neil Lloyd	Antigua and Barbuda	26.999	50.995	1:18.324	45.962
