= Cycling at the 1992 Summer Olympics – Men's track time trial =

Men's track time trial at the Games of the XXV Olympiad
- Track cycling pictogram
- Venue: Velòdrom d'Horta
- Date: 27 July
- Competitors: 32 from 32 nations
- Winning time: 1:03.342

Medalists
1st place, gold medalist(s)		José Manuel Moreno; Spain
2nd place, silver medalist(s)		Shane Kelly; Australia
3rd place, bronze medalist(s)		Erin Hartwell; United States

The men's track time trial in Cycling at the 1992 Summer Olympics was a time trial race in which each of the thirty-two cyclists attempted to set the fastest time for four laps (1 kilometre) of the track. The race was held on Monday, July 27 at the Velòdrom d'Horta. Adler Capelli rode a bike that allowed for a single gear change, a first for an Olympic track event. There were 32 competitors from 32 nations, with each nation limited to one cyclist. The event was won by José Manuel Moreno of Spain, the nation's first medal in the men's track time trial. The United States also earned its first medal in the event, with Erin Hartwell's bronze. Shane Kelly took Australia's second consecutive silver medal in the track time trial.

== Background ==
This was the 16th appearance of the event, which had previously been held in 1896 and every Games since 1928. It would be held every Games until being dropped from the programme after 2004. The returning cyclists from 1988 were gold medalist Aleksandr Kirichenko of the Soviet Union (now competing for the Unified Team), seventeenth-place finisher Mika Hämäläinen of Finland, nineteenth-place finisher Nelson Mario Pons of Ecuador, and thirtieth-place finisher Neil Lloyd of Antigua and Barbuda. Host nation Spain had the reigning world champion, José Manuel Moreno.

Indonesia and Latvia each made their debut in the men's track time trial; some former Soviet republics competed as the Unified Team. France made its 16th appearance, the only nation to have competed at every appearance of the event.

== Competition format ==
The event was a time trial on the track, with each cyclist competing separately to attempt to achieve the fastest time. Each cyclist raced one kilometre from a standing start.

== Records ==
The following were the world and Olympic records prior to the competition.

World record	Maic Malchow (GDR)	1:02.091	Colorado Springs, United States	28 August 1986
Olympic record	Lothar Thoms (GDR)	1:02.955	Moscow, Soviet Union	22 July 1980

No new world or Olympic records were set during the competition.

== Schedule ==
All times are Central European Summer Time (UTC+2)

Date	Time	Round
Monday, 27 July 1992	20:00	Final

== Results ==
Rank	Cyclist	Nation	250 m	500 m	750 m	Time	Speed (km/h)
1st place, gold medalist(s)	José Manuel Moreno	Spain	19.007	32.954	47.656	1:03.342	56.834
2nd place, silver medalist(s)	Shane Kelly	Australia	18.843	33.105	48.151	1:04.288	55.998
3rd place, bronze medalist(s)	Erin Hartwell	United States	18.993	33.302	48.391	1:04.753	55.595
4	Jens Glücklich	Germany	18.712	33.084	48.378	1:04.798	55.557
5	Adler Capelli	Italy	19.664	34.207	49.266	1:05.065	55.329
6	Frédéric Lancien	France	19.398	33.968	49.175	1:05.157	55.251
7	Jon Andrews	New Zealand	19.795	34.345	49.464	1:05.240	55.180
8	Gene Samuel	Trinidad and Tobago	18.969	33.426	48.871	1:05.485	54.974
9	Dirk Jan van Hameren	Netherlands	19.574	34.009	49.259	1:05.524	54.941
10	Keiji Kojima	Japan	19.688	34.083	49.456	1:05.994	54.550
11	Ingus Veips	Latvia	19.248	33.535	49.089	1:06.074	54.484
12	Aleksandr Kirichenko	Unified Team	18.738	33.117	48.724	1:06.137	54.432
13	Christian Meidlinger	Austria	19.445	34.170	49.769	1:06.509	54.128
14	Anthony Stirrat	Great Britain	19.831	34.576	49.993	1:06.522	54.117
15	Mika Hämäläinen	Finland	19.480	34.321	50.055	1:06.808	53.885
16	Rocco Travella	Switzerland	19.192	33.846	49.739	1:06.811	53.883
17	Nelson Mario Pons	Ecuador	19.296	34.060	49.804	1:06.878	53.829
18	César Muciño	Mexico	19.590	34.187	49.955	1:06.984	53.744
19	Tom Steels	Belgium	19.629	34.451	50.170	1:07.085	53.663
20	Grzegorz Krejner	Poland	19.504	34.244	50.126	1:07.235	53.543
21	Kiril Georgiev	Bulgaria	19.752	35.061	50.965	1:07.371	53.435
22	Sergio Rolando	Argentina	20.206	35.561	51.502	1:08.267	52.734
23	Kurt Innes	Canada	20.206	35.215	51.219	1:08.593	52.483
24	Livingstone Alleyne	Barbados	20.434	35.543	51.689	1:09.014	52.163
25	José Velásquez	Colombia	20.594	36.149	52.515	1:10.143	51.323
26	Sean Bloch	South Africa	19.888	35.021	51.786	1:10.145	51.322
27	Herry Janto Setiawan	Indonesia	19.781	35.407	52.273	1:10.342	51.178
28	Mohamed Reza Banna	Iran	20.819	36.572	53.197	1:11.036	50.678
29	Andrew Myers	Jamaica	21.407	37.694	54.973	1:13.186	49.189
30	Pedro Vaca	Bolivia	21.304	37.389	55.069	1:14.175	48.338
31	Neil Lloyd	Antigua and Barbuda	22.138	38.226	55.810	1:14.816	48.118
32	Don Campbell	Cayman Islands	22.205	39.011	57.042	1:16.192	47.249
