= Athletics at the 1984 Summer Olympics – Women's 400 metres =

Women's 400 metres at the Games of the XXIII Olympiad
- Venue: Los Angeles Memorial Coliseum
- Date: 4 August 1984 (heats); 5 August 1984 (semi-finals); 6 August 1984 (final)
- Competitors: 28 from 18 nations
- Winning time: 48.83 OR

Medalists
1st place, gold medalist(s)		Valerie Brisco-Hooks; United States
2nd place, silver medalist(s)		Chandra Cheeseborough; United States
3rd place, bronze medalist(s)		Kathy Cook; Great Britain

These are the official results of the Women's 400 metres event at the 1984 Summer Olympics in Los Angeles, California. The final was held on August 6, 1984.

== Final ==
Held on August 6, 1984

Rank	Athlete	Nation	Time	Notes
1st place, gold medalist(s)	Valerie Brisco-Hooks	United States	48.83 (OR)	
2nd place, silver medalist(s)	Chandra Cheeseborough	United States	49.05	
3rd place, bronze medalist(s)	Kathy Cook	Great Britain	49.43	
4	Marita Payne	Canada	49.91	
5	Lillie Leatherwood	United States	50.25	
6	Ute Thimm	West Germany	50.37	
7	Charmaine Crooks	Canada	50.45	
8	Ruth Waithera	Kenya	51.56	

== Semifinals ==
- Held on August 5, 1984

Rank	Athlete	Nation	Time	Notes
1	Valerie Brisco-Hooks	United States	51.14	
2	Kathy Cook	Great Britain	51.49	
3	Charmaine Crooks	Canada	51.53	
4	Ruth Waithera	Kenya	52.21	
5	June Griffith	Guyana	52.39	
6	Cathy Rattray-Williams	Jamaica	53.23	
7	Marie Mathieu	Puerto Rico	53.69	
–	Gaby Bußmann	West Germany	DNS	

Rank	Athlete	Nation	Time	Notes
1	Chandra Cheeseborough	United States	50.32	
2	Lillie Leatherwood	United States	50.83	
3	Marita Payne	Canada	50.94	
4	Ute Thimm	West Germany	51.03	
5	Molly Killingbeck	Canada	51.72	
6	Michelle Scutt	Great Britain	52.07	
7	Ilrey Oliver	Jamaica	52.14	
8	Helen Barnett	Great Britain	52.26	

== Round one ==
- Held on August 4, 1984

Rank	Athlete	Nation	Time	Notes
1	Chandra Cheeseborough	United States	50.94	
2	Charmaine Crooks	Canada	52.04	
3	Ilrey Oliver	Jamaica	52.19	
4	June Griffith	Guyana	52.27	
5	Heike Schulte-Mattler	West Germany	52.77	
6	Erica Rossi	Italy	53.04	
7	Jocelyn Joseph	Antigua and Barbuda	53.63	
8	Zonia Meigham	Guatemala	55.64	

Rank	Athlete	Nation	Time	Notes
1	Gaby Bußmann	West Germany	52.42	
2	Kathy Cook	Great Britain	52.64	
3	Molly Killingbeck	Canada	52.77	
4	Cathy Rattray-Williams	Jamaica	52.78	
5	Gail Emmanuel	Trinidad and Tobago	54.07	
6	Elanga Buala	Papua New Guinea	56.82	
7	Mercy Addy	Ghana	58.91	

Rank	Athlete	Nation	Time	Notes
1	Lillie Leatherwood	United States	52.05	
2	Marita Payne	Canada	52.89	
3	Helen Barnett	Great Britain	52.94	
4	Marie Mathieu	Puerto Rico	53.27	
5	Emma Tahapari	Indonesia	55.82	
6	Reawadee Srithoa	Thailand	58.11	

Rank	Athlete	Nation	Time	Notes
1	Valerie Brisco-Hooks	United States	51.42	
2	Ruth Waithera	Kenya	52.53	
3	Ute Thimm	West Germany	52.53	
4	Michelle Scutt	Great Britain	52.89	
5	Cynthia Green	Jamaica	53.61	
6	Carlon Blackman	Barbados	54.26	
7	Mina El-Jas Zeina	Lebanon	59.56	

== See also ==
- 1982 Women's European Championships 400 metres (Athens)
- 1983 Women's World Championships 400 metres (Helsinki)
- 1984 Women's Friendship Games 400 metres (Prague)
- 1987 Women's World Championships 400 metres (Rome)
