= Pelliccioni =

Pelliccioni is an Italian surname. Notable people with the surname include:

- Alfredo Pelliccioni (born 1953), Sammarinese sports shooter
- Flavio Pelliccioni (born 1956), Italian–born Sammarinese windsurfer
- Salvatore Pelliccioni (born 1933), Italian–born Sammarinese sports shooter
