= Zeina Mina =

Lebanese Olympic athlete (born 1963)

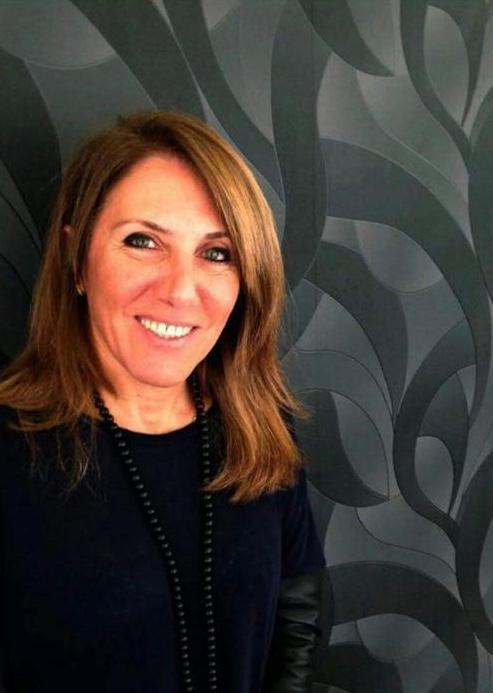

Personal information
- Native name: زينة مينا
- Full name: Zeina Mina
- Nationality: Lebanese
- Born: January 1, 1963 (age 63)

Sport
- Country: Lebanon
- Sport: Athletics
- Updated on 21 July 2017

Zeina Mina (Arabic: زينة مينا; born January 1, 1963) is a Lebanese athlete. She represented Lebanon at the 1984 Summer Olympics in Los Angeles, California, and came in last in her heat in round one. She received a PhD in sport education and management in 2015, and worked in 2017 as manager of the Sports Academy in Antonine University in Lebanon. Mina is the CEO of Performance First Lebanon.

== Olympic participation ==
Mina was the only female athlete for Lebanon in the 1984 Summer Olympics in Los Angeles among a total of 22 competitors for the country.

Athletics – Women's 400 metres – Round One

Heat 4
Rank	Athlete	Time
1.	Valerie Brisco-Hooks (USA)	51.42
2.	Ruth Waithera (KEN)	52.53
3.	Ute Thimm (FRG)	52.53
4.	Michelle Probert-Scutt (GBR)	52.89
5.	Cynthia Green (JAM)	53.61
6.	Carlon Blackman (BAR)	54.26
7.	Zeina Mina (LIB)	59.56
