= Sailing at the 1984 Summer Olympics – Windglider =

Sailing at the Olympics

Windglider at the Games of the XXIII Olympiad
- Windglider
- Venue: Long Beach
- Dates: 31 July to 8 August
- Competitors: 38 from 38 nations
- Teams: 38

Medalists
1st place, gold medalist(s)		Stephan van den Berg	Netherlands
2nd place, silver medalist(s)		Scott Steele	United States
3rd place, bronze medalist(s)		Bruce Kendall	New Zealand

The Windglider was a sailing event on the Sailing at the 1984 Summer Olympics program in Long Beach, Los Angeles County, California . Seven races were scheduled. 38 sailors, on 38 boats, from 38 nations competed.

== Results ==
Rank	Helmsman (Country)	Race I		Race II		Race III		Race IV		Race V		Race VI		Race VII		Total Points	Total -1
Rank	Helmsman (Country)	Rank	Points	Rank	Points	Rank	Points	Rank	Points	Rank	Points	Rank	Points	Rank	Points	Total Points	Total -1
1st place, gold medalist(s)	Stephan van den Berg (NED)	4	8.0	2	3.0	1	0.0	~~11~~	~~17.0~~	4	8.0	2	3.0	3	5.7	44.7	27.7
2nd place, silver medalist(s)	Scott Steele (USA)	7	13.0	1	0.0	2	3.0	1	0.0	9	15.0	9	15.0	~~14~~	~~20.0~~	66.0	46.0
3rd place, bronze medalist(s)	Bruce Kendall (NZL)	2	3.0	3	5.7	DSQ	~~45.0~~	13	19.0	2	3.0	3	5.7	5	10.0	91.4	46.4
4	Gildas Guillerot (FRA)	~~DSQ~~	~~45.0~~	6	11.7	5	10.0	16	22.0	3	5.7	1	0.0	2	3.0	97.4	52.4
5	Klaus Maran (ITA)	6	11.7	5	10.0	7	13.0	6	11.7	1	0.0	4	8.0	~~9~~	~~15.0~~	69.4	54.4
6	Greg Hyde (AUS)	8	14.0	~~12~~	~~18.0~~	8	14.0	2	3.0	7	13.0	6	11.7	1	0.0	73.7	55.7
7	Dirk Meyer (FRG)	1	0.0	14	20.0	YMP	11.2	~~20~~	~~26.0~~	12	18.0	5	10.0	4	8.0	93.2	67.2
8	Björn Eybl (AUT)	~~11~~	~~17.0~~	10	16.0	YMP	13.3	10	16.0	5	10.0	7	13.0	6	11.7	97.0	80.0
9	Peter Bonello (MLT)	9	15.0	11	17.0	~~10~~	~~16.0~~	3	5.7	10	16.0	13	19.0	7	13.0	101.7	82.7
10	Hans Nyström (SWE)	10	16.0	~~PMS~~	~~45.0~~	4	8.0	9	15.0	8	14.0	8	14.0	11	17.0	129.0	84.0
11	Svein Rasmussen (NOR)	5	10.0	~~DSQ~~	~~45.0~~	6	11.7	12	18.0	6	11.7	14	20.0	12	18.0	134.4	89.4
12	Eduardo Bellini (ESP)	3	5.7	~~15~~	~~21.~~0	YMP	15.3	24	30.0	13	19.0	11	17.0	8	14.0	122.0	92.0
13	Ken Klein Jr. (ISV)	14	20.0	8	14.0	3	5.7	8	14.0	~~16~~	~~22.0~~	12	18.0	16	22.0	115.7	93.7
14	Yehuda Atedji (ISR)	13	19.0	13	19.0	YMP	18.6	5	10.0	~~21~~	~~27.0~~	18	24.0	15	21.0	138.6	111.6
15	Dušan Puh (YUG)	15	21.0	17	23.0	13	19.0	7	13.0	14	20.0	16	22.0	~~19~~	~~25.0~~	143.0	118.0
16	Tsutomu Sato (JPN)	21	27.0	21	27.0	11	17.0	4	8.0	~~DSQ~~	~~45.0~~	17	23.0	24	30.0	177.0	132.0
17	Jorge García (ARG)	17	23.0	9	15.0	YMP	22.4	23	29.0	18	24.0	15	21.0	~~25~~	~~31.0~~	165.4	134.4
18	Mauricio Toscano (MEX)	16	22.0	19	25.0	15	21.0	18	24.0	15	21.0	20	26.0	~~23~~	~~29.0~~	168.0	139.0
19	Eric Graveline (CAN)	12	18.0	~~27~~	~~33.0~~	YMP	23.4	17	23.0	20	26.0	21	27.0	17	23.0	173.4	140.4
20	Manuel Dalmau (PUR)	19	25.0	4	8.0	YMP	23.8	~~DSQ~~	~~45.0~~	23	29.0	24	30.0	21	27.0	187.8	142.8
21	David Hackford (GBR)	~~DSQ~~	~~45.0~~	20	26.0	RET	45.0	19	25.0	11	17.0	10	16.0	10	16.0	190.0	145.0
22	José Pedro Monteiro (POR)	18	24.0	22	28.0	23	29.0	~~26~~	~~32.0~~	17	23.0	23	29.0	13	19.0	184.0	152.0
23	Saard Panyawan (THA)	29	35.0	7	13.0	18	24.0	15	21.0	25	31.0	~~33~~	~~39.0~~	29	35.0	198.0	159.0
24	Marc Erzberger (SUI)	20	26.0	~~26~~	~~32.0~~	YMP	26.8	29	35.0	19	25.0	19	25.0	20	26.0	195.8	160.8
25	Tang Qingcai (CHN)	26	32.0	16	22.0	19	25.0	14	20.0	~~28~~	~~34.0~~	28	34.0	28	34.0	201.0	167.0
26	Kelly Chan Kum Seng (SIN)	24	30.0	24	30.0	21	27.0	~~31~~	~~37.0~~	24	30.0	31	37.0	18	24.0	215.0	178.0
27	Hugh Watlington (BER)	25	31.0	~~PMS~~	~~45.0~~	27	33.0	22	28.0	26	32.0	22	28.0	22	28.0	225.0	180.0
28	Policarpio Ortega (PHI)	23	29.0	~~PMS~~	~~45.0~~	20	26.0	28	34.0	22	28.0	26	32.0	26	32.0	226.0	181.0
29	Flavio Pelliccioni (SMR)	27	33.0	18	24.0	~~29~~	~~35.0~~	27	33.0	29	35.0	27	33.0	27	33.0	226.0	191.0
30	Inigo Ross (ANT)	28	34.0	29	35.0	26	32.0	~~34~~	~~40.0~~	27	33.0	29	35.0	30	36.0	245.0	205.0
31	Stelios Georgousopoulos (GRE)	22	28.0	28	34.0	32	38.0	32	38.0	31	37.0	25	31.0	~~DNF~~	~~45.0~~	251.0	206.0
32	Ken Choi (HKG)	31	37.0	25	31.0	31	37.0	21	27.0	30	36.0	~~34~~	~~40.0~~	33	39.0	247.0	207.0
33	Tony Philp (FIJ)	~~DSQ~~	~~45.0~~	23	29.0	28	34.0	25	31.0	PMS	45.0	30	36.0	31	37.0	257.0	212.0
34	Cho Jin-sup (KOR)	32	38.0	30	36.0	33	39.0	30	36.0	34	40.0	~~RET~~	~~45.0~~	34	40.0	274.0	229.0
35	Babacar Wade (SEN)	30	36.0	34	40.0	~~DSQ~~	~~45.0~~	35	41.0	33	39.0	32	38.0	32	38.0	277.0	232.0
36	Antonio Esteban (DOM)	~~DNF~~	~~45.0~~	31	37.0	30	36.0	33	39.0	32	38.0	35	41.0	DSQ	45.0	281.0	236.0
37	Talib Salim Al-Maiwali (OMA)	33	39.0	33	39.0	YMP	40.6	36	42.0	36	42.0	~~DNF~~	~~45.0~~	35	41.0	288.6	243.6
38	Thomas Nisbet (BAH)	~~DNF~~	~~45.0~~	32	38.0	34	40.0	RET	45.0	35	41.0	36	42.0	RET	45.0	296.0	251.0

DNF = Did Not Finish, DNS= Did Not Start, DSQ = Disqualified, PMS = Premature Start, YMP = Yacht Materially Prejudiced
= Male, = Female

=== Daily standings ===
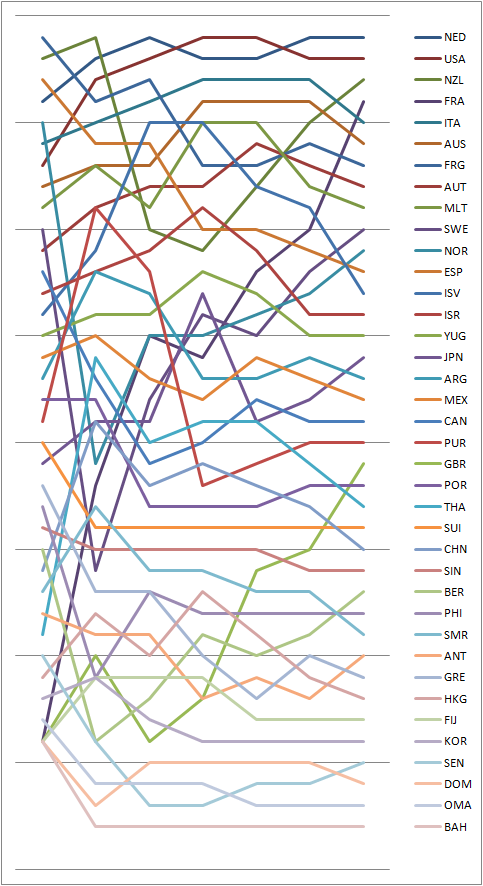
Graph showing the daily standings in the Windglider during the 1984 Summer Olympics

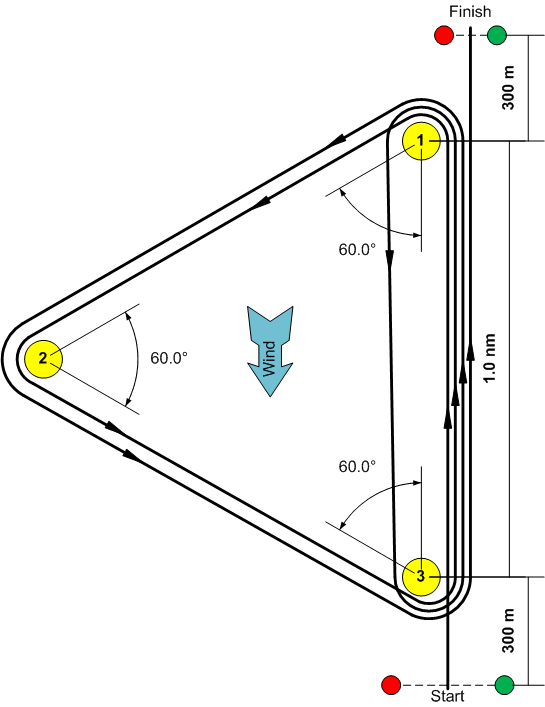
Windglider Course Map
