= Jamaica at the 1984 Summer Olympics =

- IOC code: JAM
- NOC: Jamaica Olympic Association

in Los Angeles
- Competitors: 45 (31 men and 14 women) in 5 sports
- Flag bearer: Bert Cameron
- Medals Ranked 28th: Gold 0 Silver 1 Bronze 2 Total 3

Summer Olympics appearances (overview)
- 1948; 1952; 1956; 1960; 1964; 1968; 1972; 1976; 1980; 1984; 1988; 1992; 1996; 2000; 2004; 2008; 2012; 2016; 2020; 2024

Other related appearances
- British West Indies (1960 S)

Jamaica competed at the 1984 Summer Olympics (for the tenth time) in Los Angeles, United States. 45 competitors, 31 men and 14 women, took part in 35 events in 5 sports.

== Medalists ==
Medal	Name	Sport	Event	Date
Silver	Norman Edwards (*); Albert Lawrence; Greg Meghoo; Don Quarrie; Ray Stewart	Athletics	Men's 4 × 100 metres relay	11 August
Bronze	Merlene Ottey-Page	Athletics	Women's 100 metres	5 August
Bronze	Merlene Ottey-Page	Athletics	Women's 200 metres	9 August

== Athletics ==
Men's 400 metres

- Bertland Cameron

- Heat – 46.14
- Quarterfinals – 45.15
- Semifinals – 45.10 (→ advanced to final did not run due to injury)

- Devon Morris

- Heat – 45.80
- Quarterfinals – 46.14 (→ did not advance)

- Mark Senior

- Heat – 46.73
- Quarterfinals – 46.50 (→ did not advance)

Men's Marathon

- Derick Adamson — 2:25:02 (→ 52nd place)

Men's High Jump

- Desmond Morris

- Qualification – 2.15m (→ did not advance)

Women's 400m Hurdles

- Sandra Farmer

- Heat – 57.06
- Semifinal – 56.05
- Final – 57.15 (→ 8th place)

- Averill Dwyer-Brown

- Heat – 58.42 (→ did not advance)

Women's Long Jump

- Dorothy Scott

- Qualification – 6.47 m
- Final – 6.40 m (→ 10th place)

Women's Discus Throw

- Marlene Lewis

- Qualification – 49.00m (→ did not advance)

== Cycling ==
Five cyclists represented Jamaica in 1984.

Individual road race

- Arthur Tenn
- Lorenzo Murdock

Sprint

- Ian Stanley

1000m time trial

- David Weller

Points race

- Peter Aldridge
- Ian Stanley

== Swimming ==
Men's 100m Freestyle

- Deryck Marks

- Heat – 54.63 (→ did not advance, 45th place)

- Gordon Scarlett

- Heat – 55.34 (→ did not advance, 52nd place)

Men's 100m Backstroke

- Allan Marsh

- Heat – 1:00.04 (→ did not advance, 27th place)

Men's 200m Backstroke

- Allan Marsh

- Heat – 2:11.57 (→ did not advance, 27th place)

Men's 100m Butterfly

- Allan Marsh

- Heat – 57.69 (→ did not advance, 33rd place)

- Deryck Marks

- Heat – 1:00.57 (→ did not advance, 41st place)

Men's 200m Individual Medley

- Andrew Phillips

- Heat – 2:06.43
- Final – 2:05.60 (→ 6th place)

Men's 400m Individual Medley

- Andrew Phillips

- Heat – 4:29.43
- B-Final – 4:27.98 (→ 10th place)

Men's 4 × 100 m Freestyle Relay

- Andrew Phillips, Deryck Marks, Allan Marsh, and Gordon Scarlett

- Heat – 3:34.87 (→ did not advance, 18th place)

Men's 4 × 100 m Medley Relay

- Allan Marsh, Andrew Phillips, Deryck Marks, and Gordon Scarlett

- Heat – 4:05.35 (→ did not advance, 17th place)
