= Windsurfer World Championships =

Youth Windsurfing sailing regatta

The International Windsurfer Class World Championships is an bi-annual international sailing regatta of Windsurfer Class which is one design windsurfer, organized by the host club on behalf of the International Class Association and recognized by World Sailing, the sports IOC recognized governing body. In 1973 the US Nationals was held San Diego / USA and served as the class first international event it was won Bruce Matlack (USA) by Susie Swatek (USA).

== Events ==
Editions			Host			Sailors				Ref.
No.	Date	Year	Host club	Location	Nat.	Gender	No.	Nat.	Cont.	Ref.
		1974		Association Island, NY	United States					
		1975		Bendor	France					
		1976		Nassau	Bahamas					
		1977		Baia Sardinia	Italy					
		1978		Cancun	Mexico					
		1979		Clearwater Beach	United States					
		1979		Porto Hydra	Greece					
		1980		Freeport/Lucaya	Bahamas					
		1981		Nago City	Japan					
		1982		Arzachena	Italy					
		1983		Kingston	Canada					
		1984/85		Perth	Australia					
		1985/86		Praia do Forte	Brazil					
		1987/88		Plettenberg Bay	South Africa					
		1989/90			Australia					
		1991			Australia					
		1992			South Africa					
		1993			Italy					
		1994			Australia					
		1995			Fiji					
		1996			Italy					
		1997/98		Fremantle	Australia					
		2000s	CLASS NOT ACTIVE							
		2019	Circolo Surf Torbole	Torbole	Italy	Male				
		2019	Circolo Surf Torbole	Torbole	Italy	Female				
		2022		Albaria	Italy	Male				
		2022		Albaria	Italy	Female				
		2023	South of Perth Yacht Club	Perth	Australia	Male				
		2023	South of Perth Yacht Club	Perth	Australia	Female				
	16-22 Sept.	2024	Club de Vela Ballena Alegre	Girona	Spain	Male				
	16-22 Sept.	2024	Club de Vela Ballena Alegre	Girona	Spain	Female				
	11–17 Oct	2025		Athens	Greece	Male	22			
	11–17 Oct	2025		Athens	Greece	Female	22			

== Medallists ==
=== Male ===
Year	Gold	Siver	Bronze	Ref
1974	Matt Schweitzer (USA)			
1975	Matt Schweitzer (USA)			
1976	Robby Naish (USA)			
1977	Robby Naish (USA)			
1978	Robby Naish (USA)			
1979	Robby Naish (USA)			
1979	Cort Larned (USA)			
1980	Charlie Mesmer (SUI)			
1981	Mike Waltze (USA)			
1982	Matt Schweitzer (USA)			
1983	Matt Schweitzer (USA)			
1984/85	Bruce Wylie (AUS)			
1985/86	Paolo Barozzi (ITA)			
1987/88	Murray Spiers (RSA)			
1987/88	ITA Paolo Barozzi (ITA)			
1989/90	Greg Hyde (AUS)			
1991	Tony Philp (FIJ)			
1992	Tony Philp (FIJ)			
1993	Tony Philp (FIJ)			
1994	Beau Molson (AUS)			
1995	Tony Philp (FIJ)			
1996	Adam Quinn (AUS)			
1997/98	Beau Moulson (AUS)			
2019	Nick Bez (AUS)			
2022	Alessandro Alberti (ITA)	Riccardo Giordano (ITA)	Eric Belot (FRA)	
2023	Lars Kleppich (AUS)			
2024	Alessandro Alberti (ITA)			
2025	Riccardo Giordano (ITA)	Alessandro Alberti (ITA)	Andrea Marchesi (ITA)	

=== Female ===
Year	Gold	Siver	Bronze	Ref
1974	Bep Thijs (NED)			
1975	Susie Swatek (USA)			
1976	Susie Swatek (USA)			
1977	C. Forest-Fourcade (FRA)			
1978	Bep Thijs (NED)			
1979	N. Hutchinson (USA)			
1979	Manuelle Graveline (FRA)			
1980	M. Mascia (ITA)			
1981	Rhonda Smith (USA)			
1982	Rhonda Smith (USA)			
1983	Karen Morch (CAN)			
1984/85	Carol-Ann Alie (CAN)			
1985/86	Jessica Crisp (AUS)			
1987/88	M. Hardman (RSA)			
1989/90	Jessica Crisp (AUS)			
1991	Sharon Richardson (AUS)			
1992	Celine Bordier (FRA)			
1993	Fiona Taylor (AUS)			
1994	Lanee Butler (USA)			
1995	Anne Francoise (FRA)			
1996	M. Tajina (JPN)			
1997/98	Lanee Butler (USA)			
2019	Masako Imai Osada (JPN)			
2022	Laura Linares (ITA)	Marta Monge (ITA)	Roberta Piras (ITA)	
2023	Lanee Butler (USA)			
2024	Celine Bordier (FRA)			
2025				
