= Nakatake =

Nakatake (written: 中武) is a Japanese surname. Notable people with the surname include:

- Katsuo Nakatake (中武 克雄, born 1964), Japanese cyclist
- Shunsuke Nakatake (中武 駿介, born 1990), Japanese footballer
