= Babacar Wade =

Senegalese windsurfer

El Hadj Wade
Personal information
- Full name: El Hadji Babacar Wade
- Nationality: Senegalese
- Height: 180 cm (5 ft 11 in)
- Weight: 75 kg (165 lb)

Sailing career
- Sport: Sailing
- Class: Windglider

El Hadj Wade, also known as El Hadji Babacar Wade or Babacar Wade, is a Senegalese windsurfer. He competed in the Windglider event at the 1984 Summer Olympics.
