= Tsutomu Sato =

Tsutomu Sato may refer to:

- Tsutomu Sato (politician) (佐藤 勉, born 1952), Japanese politician
- Tsutomu Sato (ophthalmologist) (1902–1960), Japanese ophthalmologist
- Tsutomu Sato, commanding officer of Japanese battleship Fusō
- Tsutomu Satō (author) (佐島 勤), Japanese novelist
- Tsutomu Sato (windsurfer) (佐藤 務, born 1960), Japanese windsurfer
