= Ken Klein =

Ken Klein can refer to:

- Ken Klein Sr. (born 1936), sailor for the United States Virgin Islands
- Ken Klein Jr. (born 1959), windsurfer for the United States Virgin Islands
