= Jo Jin-seop =

South Korean windsurfer

Personal information
- Nationality: South Korean
- Born: 5 January 1965 (age 60)
- Height: 165 cm (5 ft 5 in)
- Weight: 56 kg (123 lb)

Sailing career
- Class: Windglider

Jo Jin-seop (Korean: 조진섭, also known as Cho Jin-Sup, born 5 January 1965) is a South Korean windsurfer. He competed in the Windglider event at the 1984 Summer Olympics.
