= José Antonio Urquijo =

Chilean cyclist

Personal information
- Born: 16 December 1960
- Died: 28 March 2021 (aged 60)

Cycling career
- Sport: Cycling

José Antonio Urquijo (16 December 1960 – 28 March 2021) was a Chilean track cyclist. He competed in the sprint event at the 1984 Summer Olympics.
