= Alex Ongaro =

Canadian cyclist

Personal information
- Born: 5 October 1963 (age 63) Edmonton, Alberta, Canada

Cycling career
- Sport: Cycling

Alex Ongaro (born 5 October 1963) is a Canadian former cyclist. He competed in the sprint event at the 1984 Summer Olympics.
