= Björn Eybl =

Austrian windsurfer

Personal information
- Nationality: Austrian
- Born: 21 February 1965 (age 60); Wels, Austria
- Height: 180 cm (5 ft 11 in)
- Weight: 69 kg (152 lb)

Sport
- Sport: Windsurfing

Björn Eybl (born 21 February 1965) is an Austrian windsurfer. He competed in the Windglider event at the 1984 Summer Olympics.
