= Sergio Rolando =

Argentine cyclist

Personal information
- Born: 16 March 1973 (age 53)

Cycling career
- Sport: Cycling

Sergio Rolando (born 16 March 1973) is an Argentine former cyclist. He competed in the track time trial at the 1992 Summer Olympics.
