= Inigo Ross =

Antigua and Barbuda windsurfer

Personal information
- Nationality: Antigua and Barbuda
- Born: 6 August 1960
- Died: 1997 (aged 36–37); Saint Vincent Passage

Sport
- Sport: Windsurfing

Inigo Ross (6 August 1960 – 1997) was an Antigua and Barbuda windsurfer. He competed in the Windglider event at the 1984 Summer Olympics. In June 1997, he and triathlete Dina Bilbao disappeared after their boat broke down in the Saint Vincent Passage. The unprofessionalism of the search contributed to the creation of Antigua and Barbuda Search and Rescue.
