= Ingus Veips =

Latvian cyclist

Personal information
- Born: 12 December 1969 (age 56) Madona, Latvia

Cycling career
- Sport: Cycling

Ingus Veips (born 12 December 1969) is a Latvian former cyclist. He competed in the track time trial at the 1992 Summer Olympics.
