= Antonio Esteban =

Dominican windsurfer

Personal information
- Nationality: Dominican
- Born: 1965

Sport
- Sport: Windsurfing

Antonio Esteban (born 1965) is a Dominican windsurfer. He competed in the Windglider event at the 1984 Summer Olympics.
