= Yehuda Atedji =

Israeli windsurfer

Personal information
- Native name: יהודה אטדגי
- Born: June 14, 1961 (age 65) Israel
- Height: 5 ft 8.5 in (174 cm)
- Weight: 150 lb (68 kg)

Sport
- Country: Israel
- Sport: Sailing
- Event: mistral

Yehuda Atedji (Hebrew: יהודה אטדגי; born June 14, 1961) is an Israeli former Olympic windsurfer. He was born in Israel and is Jewish.

== Windsurfing career ==
He competed for Israel at the 1984 Summer Olympics in Los Angeles (at Long Beach, California) at the age of 23. In Men's Windsurfer/Windglider (mistral) he came in 14th out of 38 competitors. His best result was his 5th-place finish in Race 4. When he competed in the Olympics, he was 5 ft 8.5 in (174 cm) tall and weighed 150 lb (68 kg).
