= Marcelo Greuel =

Brazilian cyclist

Personal information
- Born: 31 January 1963 (age 63)

Cycling career
- Sport: Cycling

Marcelo Greuel (born 31 January 1963) is a Brazilian former cyclist. He competed in the 1000m time trial event at the 1984 Summer Olympics.
