= Tony Philp =

Fijian windsurfer

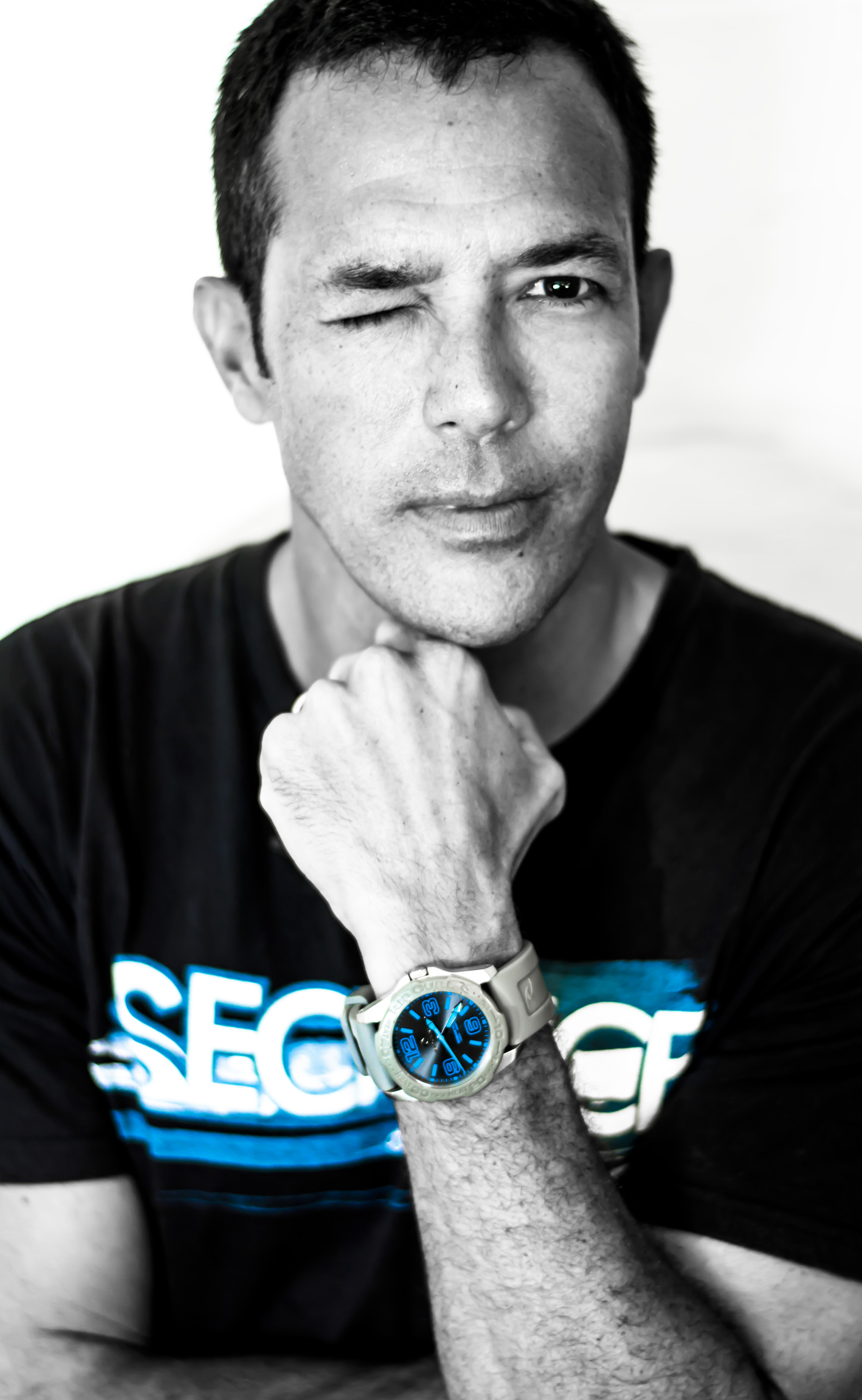
- Tony Philp in 2015

Personal information
- Born: Anthony Steven Philp; June 14, 1969 (age 57) Suva, Fiji
- Height: 5 ft 9 in (1.75 m)
- Weight: 68 kg (150 lb)
- Website: http://www.tonyphilp.com

Sport
- Country: Fiji
- Sport: Sailing / Windsurfing

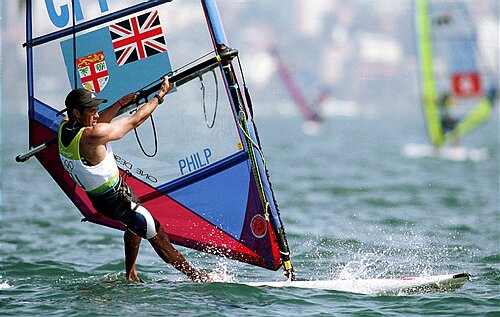
Tony Philp windsurfing

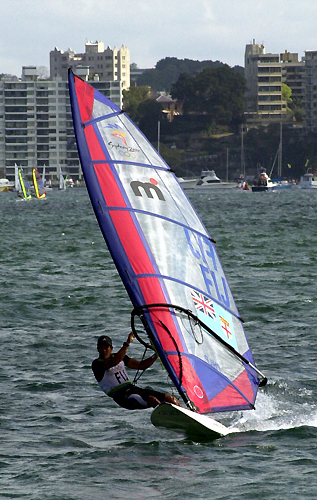
Tony Philp windsurfing

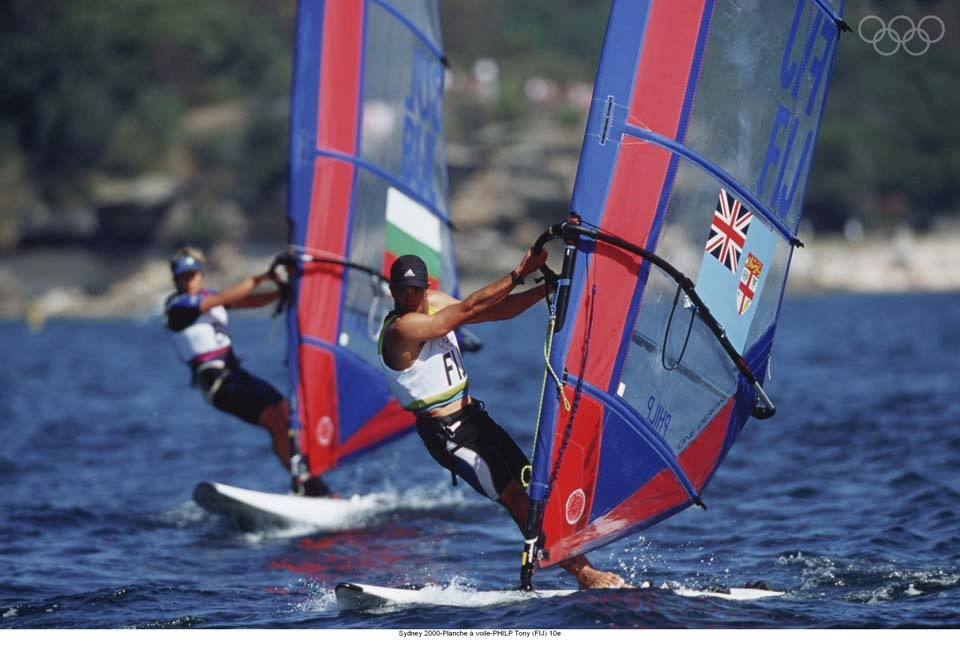
Tony Philp windsurfing

Anthony Steven "Tony" Philp MF is a former windsurfing World champion and Olympic sailor from Fiji.

Philp is one of only two Fiji-born athletes, along with golfer Vijay Singh, to be ranked number one in their sports official world ranking list.

Throughout his sporting career Philp won 13 individual Windsurfer World titles at the 1991, 1992, 1993, 1994, 1995 World Championships (including 4 overall world titles) and competed at 5 consecutive Olympic Games from 1984 to 2000. He was also vice–world champion in both the Windsurfer and Mistral Olympic classes in 1989 and 1999 and topped the International Sailing Federation world-ranking list for Olympic windsurfing in 1997.

At age 15, Philp was the youngest ever athlete to compete at an Olympic sailing event (Los Angeles 1984), and was a flag bearer for his country at the 2000 Olympic Games. He was made a Member of the Order of Fiji, the most senior award in the Fijian honors system in 1995 and was inducted into the Fiji Sports Hall of Fame in 2009, for achievements and contribution towards sports in Fiji.

Currently a brand ambassador for international outdoor magazine The Outdoor Journal, he is also a consultant for the International Surfing Association.

== Selected achievements ==
Result	Event	Venue/Country	Year
Olympics
33	Sailing at the 1984 Summer Olympics – Windglider	Long Beach United States	1984
28	Sailing at the 1988 Summer Olympics – Men's Division II	Busan South Korea	1988
10	Sailing at the 1992 Summer Olympics – Men's Lechner A-390	Barcelona Spain	1992
14	Sailing at the 1996 Summer Olympics – Men's Mistral One Design	Savannah United States	1996
10	Sailing at the 2000 Summer Olympics – Men's Mistral One Design	Sydney Australia	2000
Worlds
2nd	Windsurfer World Championships	Belmont, Australia	1989
1st	Windsurfer World Championships	Adelaide, Australia	1991
1st	Windsurfer World Championships	Port Elizabeth, South Africa	1992
1st	Windsurfer World Championships	Sardinia, Italy	1993
1st	Windsurfer World Championships	Illawarra, Australia	1994
1st	Windsurfer World Championships	Pacific Harbour, Fiji	1995
7th	Mistral World Championships	Port Elizabeth, South Africa	1995
9th	Mistral World Championships	Perth, Australia	1997
2nd	Mistral World Championships	Nouméa, New Caledonia (France)	1999
5th	Mistral World Championships	Mar del Plata, Argentina	2000
Other
1st	Fiji Windsurfing Championships	Beachcomber Is, Fiji	1983
3rd	Pacific Games	Nouméa, New Caledonia (France)	1987
2nd	Pacific Games	Port Moresby, Papua New Guinea	1991
Award	Sportsman of the Year	Fiji	1992
2nd	Australian Championships	Perth, Australia	1993
Award	Sportsman of the Year	Fiji	1994
3rd	Pre-Olympics	Savannah, USA (United States)	1994
1st	Go for Gold (Olympic series regatta)	Georgia, USA (United States)	1995
2nd	Pre-Olympics	Savannah, USA (United States)	1995
2nd	Pacific Games	Papeete, Tahiti (French Polynesia)	1995
1st	North American Championships	Jeykl Is. (GA), USA (United States)	1995
3rd	Miami Olympic Week	Biscayne Bay (FL), USA (United States)	1995
2nd	Kiel Olympic Week	Kiel, Germany	1995
3rd	European Championships	Nice, France	1996
3rd	Palamos Olympic Week	Palamos, Spain	1996
1st	Hong Kong Open	Kowloon Bay, Hong Kong	1996
1st	Asia Mistral Elite Regatta	Guangdong, China	1996
1st	World Ranking (ISAF)		1997
2nd	Kiel Olympic Week	Kiel, Germany	1997
1st	Roma Olympic Week	Anzio, Italy	1997
1st	Sail Melbourne ISAF World Cup Series	Melbourne, Australia	1997
1st	Austrian Lakes Week	Neusiedler See, Austria	1997
1st	Hyères Olympic Week	Hyères, France	1997
2nd	Kiel Olympic Week	Kiel, Germany	1998
1st	Pacific Games	Guam	1999
3rd	Sail Melbourne Olympic Week	Melbourne, Australia	1999
1st	Trade Wind Trophy	Iles of Pines, New Caledonia (France)	1999
3rd	Sail Auckland Olympic Week	Auckland, New Zealand	1999
3rd	Hyères Olympic Week	Hyères, France	1999
3rd	Oceania Championships	Sydney (Australia)	2000
3rd	French Championships	Brest, France	2000

== See also ==
- Windsurfing World Championships
- List of World Championships medalists in sailing (windsurfer classes)
