= Marc Erzberger =

Swiss windsurfer

Personal information
- Nationality: Swiss
- Born: 12 March 1968 (age 57)

Sport
- Sport: Windsurfing

Marc Erzberger (born 12 March 1968) is a Swiss windsurfer. He competed in the Windglider event at the 1984 Summer Olympics.
