= Svein Rasmussen =

Norwegian windsurfer

Svein Rasmussen (born 5 June 1963) is a Norwegian windsurfer. He was born in Arendal Municipality, Norway.

He started windsurfing in 1978 at the Arendal Sailing Club, won the Mistral Worlds in 1983 and participated in the windsurfing competition at the 1984 Summer Olympics in Los Angeles, where he placed eleventh. In 1991, he became the first sailor to win in all disciplines of the IFCA Production Class Worlds.

In 1993, Svein Rasmussen retired from competition and decided to start his own windsurfing company. After meeting with Jean-Louis Colmas, a shaper from New Caledonia who, at that time, was the only one to use wood to build windsurf boards, Rasmussen founded Starboard in 1994 and based the company in Thailand where it still is today.
