= Charles Pile =

Barbadian cyclist

Personal information
- Born: 5 April 1956 (age 70)

Cycling career
- Sport: Cycling

Charles Pile (born 5 April 1956) is a Barbadian former cyclist. He competed in the sprint and 1000m time trial events at the 1984 Summer Olympics.
