= Hugh Watlington =

Bermudian windsurfer

Personal information
- Full name: Hubert Watlington
- Nationality: Bermudian
- Born: 11 March 1954 (age 71)
- Height: 172 cm (5 ft 8 in)
- Weight: 67 kg (148 lb)

Sport
- Sport: Windsurfing

Hubert "Hugh" Watlington (born 11 March 1954) is a Bermudian windsurfer. He competed in the Windglider event at the 1984 Summer Olympics.
