= Tony Graham (cyclist) =

New Zealand cyclist

Personal information
- Born: 26 March 1962 (age 64) Gisborne, New Zealand

Cycling career
- Sport: Cycling

Tony Graham (born 26 March 1962) is a New Zealand former cyclist. He competed in 1 km time trial event at the 1988 Summer Olympics.
