= Hans Nyström =

Swedish windsurfer

Personal information
- Full name: Hans Gustaf Nyström
- Nationality: Swedish
- Born: 23 August 1960 (age 64); Bromma, Stockholm, Sweden

Sport
- Sport: Windsurfing
- Club: Royal Swedish Yacht Club

Hans Gustaf Nyström (born 23 August 1960) is a Swedish windsurfer. He competed in the Windglider event at the 1984 Summer Olympics, finishing in 10th place.
