= David Hackford =

British windsurfer

Personal information
- Full name: David J. Hackford
- Nationality: British
- Born: 3 March 1964 (age 61); Sunderland, England

Sport
- Country: Great Britain
- Sport: Windsurfing

David J. Hackford (born 3 March 1964) is a British windsurfer. He competed in the Windglider event at the 1984 Summer Olympics.
