= Frank Orban =

Belgian cyclist

Personal information
- Born: 29 September 1964 (age 62) Antwerp, Belgium

Cycling career
- Sport: Cycling

Frank Orban (born 29 September 1964) is a Belgian former cyclist. He competed in the sprint event at the 1984 Summer Olympics.
