= Gerhard Scheller =

German cyclist

Personal information
- Born: 19 October 1958 (age 67) Nuremberg, West Germany

Cycling career
- Sport: Cycling

Gerhard Scheller (born 19 October 1958) is a German former cyclist. He competed in the sprint event at the 1984 Summer Olympics.
