= Manuel Dalmau =

Puerto Rican windsurfer

Personal information
- Nationality: Puerto Rican
- Born: 26 October 1961 (age 63)

Sport
- Sport: Windsurfing

Manuel Dalmau (born 26 October 1961) is a Puerto Rican windsurfer. He competed in the Windglider event at the 1984 Summer Olympics.
