= Claus Rasmussen =

Danish cyclist

Personal information
- Born: 31 December 1957 (age 68) Svendborg, Denmark

Cycling career
- Sport: Cycling

Claus Rasmussen (born 31 December 1957) is a Danish former cyclist. He competed in the 1000m time trial event at the 1984 Summer Olympics.
