= José Pedro Monteiro =

Portuguese windsurfer

José Monteiro
Personal information
- Full name: José Pedro Monteiro
- Nationality: Portuguese
- Born: 27 July 1959 (age 65)
- Height: 180 cm (5 ft 11 in)
- Weight: 75 kg (165 lb)

Sport
- Sport: Windsurfing

José Pedro Monteiro (born 27 July 1959) is a Portuguese windsurfer. He competed in the Windglider event at the 1984 Summer Olympics.
