= Rodolfo Guaves =

Filipino cyclist

Personal information
- Born: August 21, 1953 (age 73)
- Height: 170 cm (5 ft 7 in)
- Weight: 59 kg (130 lb)

Cycling career
- Sport: Cycling

Rodolfo Guaves (born August 21, 1953) is a Filipino former cyclist. He competed in the sprint and 1000m time trial events at the 1984 Summer Olympics and 1982 Asian Games.
