= Dušan Puh =

Slovenian windsurfer

Personal information
- Nationality: Slovenian
- Born: 14 November 1951 (age 74) Koper, Yugoslavia

Sport
- Sport: Windsurfing

Dušan Puh (born 14 November 1951) is a Slovenian windsurfer. He competed in the Windglider event at the 1984 Summer Olympics.
