= Thomas Nisbet =

Bahamian windsurfer

Personal information
- Nationality: Bahamian
- Born: 16 September 1955 (age 70)

Sport
- Sport: Windsurfing

Thomas Nisbet (born 16 September 1955) is a Bahamian windsurfer. He competed in the Windglider event at the 1984 Summer Olympics.
