= Kiril Georgiev (cyclist) =

Bulgarian cyclist

Personal information
- Born: 16 August 1971 (age 55)

Cycling career
- Sport: Cycling

Kiril Georgiev (born 16 August 1971) is a Bulgarian former cyclist. He competed in the track time trial at the 1992 Summer Olympics.
