= Gail Emmanuel =

Trinidad and Tobago sprinter

Personal information
- Nationality: Trinidad and Tobago
- Born: 29 August 1962 (age 63)

Sport
- Sport: Sprinting
- Event: 400 metres

Gail Emmanuel (born 29 August 1962) is a Trinidad and Tobago sprinter. She competed in the women's 400 metres at the 1984 Summer Olympics.

Emmanuel competed for the Grambling State Tigers track and field team in the NCAA.
