= Kurt Innes =

Canadian cyclist

Personal information
- Born: 24 February 1971 (age 55) Deloraine, Manitoba, Canada

Cycling career
- Sport: Cycling

Kurt Innes (born 24 February 1971) is a Canadian former cyclist. He competed in the track time trial at the 1992 Summer Olympics. He later became a coach for the national team.
