= Tang Qingcai =

Chinese windsurfer

Personal information
- Nationality: Chinese
- Born: 26 March 1961 (age 64)

Sport
- Sport: Windsurfing

Tang Qingcai (born 26 March 1961) is a Chinese windsurfer. He competed in the Windglider event at the 1984 Summer Olympics.
