= Mauricio Toscano =

Mexican windsurfer (born 1965)

Personal information
- Nationality: Mexican
- Born: 10 April 1965 (age 59)

Sport
- Sport: Windsurfing

Mauricio Toscano (born 10 April 1965) is a Mexican windsurfer. He competed in the Windglider event at the 1984 Summer Olympics.
