= Eduardo Bellini =

Spanish windsurfer

Personal information
- Full name: Eduardo Felipe Bellini Ferrer
- Nationality: Spanish
- Born: 13 May 1966 (age 58); Pollença, Mallorca, Balearic Islands
- Height: 180 cm (5 ft 11 in)
- Weight: 80 kg (176 lb)

Sport
- Sport: Windsurfing

Eduardo Felipe Bellini Ferrer (Note: In this Spanish name, the first or paternal surname is Bellini and the second or maternal family name is Ferrer.) (born 13 May 1966) is a Spanish windsurfer. He competed in the Windglider event at the 1984 Summer Olympics.
