= Bobby Livingston (cyclist) =

American cyclist

Personal information
- Born: February 10, 1965 (age 61) Cleveland, Ohio, United States

Cycling career
- Sport: Cycling

Bobby Livingston (born February 10, 1965) is an American former cyclist. He competed in the 1 km time trial event at the 1988 Summer Olympics.
