= Ilrey Oliver =

Jamaican sprinter (1962–2002)

Personal information
- Nationality: Jamaican
- Born: 2 September 1962
- Died: 26 December 2002 (aged 40)

Sport
- Sport: Sprinting
- Event: 400 metres

Ilrey Oliver (2 September 1962 – 26 December 2002) was a Jamaican sprinter. She competed in the women's 400 metres at the 1984 Summer Olympics. She was killed in a road accident in Florida in 2002.

Competing for the Tennessee Volunteers women's track and field team, Oliver won the 1986 NCAA Division I Outdoor Track and Field Championships in the 4 × 100 m.
