= Gildas Guillerot =

French windsurfer

Personal information
- Nationality: French
- Born: 28 July 1963 (age 61)
- Height: 190 cm (6 ft 3 in)
- Weight: 85 kg (187 lb)

Sport
- Sport: Windsurfing

Gildas Guillerot (born 28 July 1963) is a French windsurfer. He competed in the Windglider event at the 1984 Summer Olympics.
