= Robert Lechner =

German cyclist

Personal information
- Born: 22 January 1967 (age 59) Bruckmühl, West Germany

Cycling career
- Sport: Cycling
Medal record
Men's cycling
Representing West Germany
Olympic Games
Bronze medal – third place	1988 Seoul	1000m Time Trial

Robert Lechner (born 22 January 1967) is a retired track cyclist who competed for West Germany at the 1988 Summer Olympics in Seoul, winning a bronze medal in the 1000 metres time trial.
