= Stephan van den Berg =

Dutch windsurfer (born 1962)

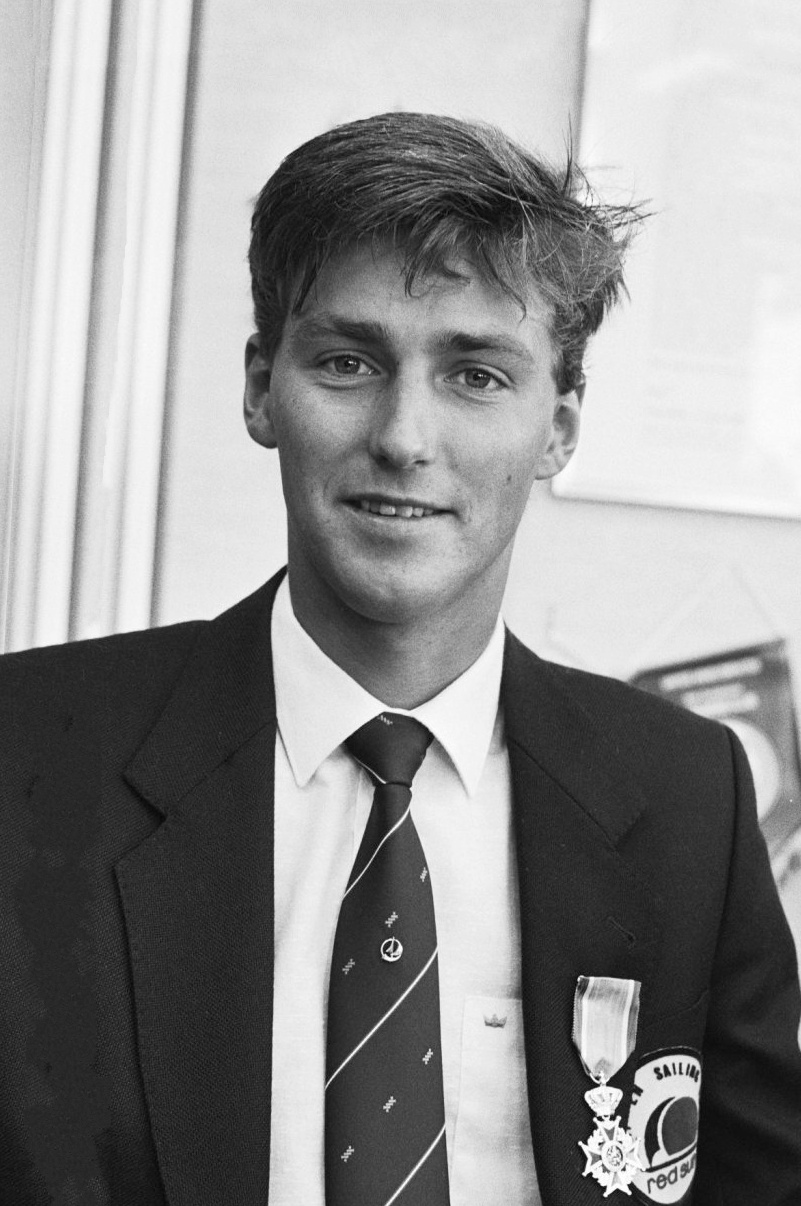
- Stephan van den Berg in 1985

Personal information
- Born: 20 February 1962 (age 64) Hoorn
- Height: 1.86 m (6 ft 1 in)
- Weight: 70 kg (154 lb)

Sailing career
- Sport: Sailing
- Class(es): Windglider; Lechner A-390
Competition record
Representing Netherlands
Olympic Games
Gold medal – first place	1984 Los Angeles	Windglider
7th	1992 Barcelona	Men's Lechner A-390
- Updated on 19 February 2014

Stephan van den Berg (born 20 February 1962) is a retired windsurfer from the Netherlands. He was world champion in 1983 and in the 1984 Summer Olympics, Long beach, California won the first Olympic Gold medal in the Windglider for the Netherlands. After that he turned professional and therefore missed the 1988 Olympics. He returned to amateurs to compete at the 1992 Olympics, Barcelona where he finished in seventh place in the Men's Lechner A-390.

== Professional life ==
Stephan van den Berg is, with his brothers, owner of VANDENBERG Surf. With outlets in Almere, Hoorn and Zandvoort it is specialized in the popular sports like:

- Windsurfing
- Kitesurfing
- Wingfoiling
- SUP
- Watersports
- Winter sports

Awards
Preceded by Rob Druppers	Dutch Sportsman of the Year; 1984	Succeeded by Joop Zoetemelk
