= Olympic Velodrome (Carson, California) =

Track cycling venue for the 1984 summer games

- Interactive map of Olympic Velodrome
- Location: Carson, California, United States
- Field size: 333.3 m (364.5 yd) track

Construction
- Built: 1981–1982
- Opened: 1982
- Closed: 2003

The Olympic Velodrome for the track cycling events at the 1984 Summer Olympics was located on the campus of California State University, Dominguez Hills in Carson, California. Constructed between 1981 and 1982, the velodrome was sponsored by the American convenience store chain 7-Eleven.

The 333.3 meter long track was demolished in 2003 and replaced by the ADT Event Center in 2004, now known as the VELO Sports Center, which remains the only Olympic-standard velodrome in the United States. The ADT center was built to the south of where the Olympic Velodrome had been. Dignity Health Sports Park soccer stadium (formerly Home Depot Center and StubHub Center) is situated where the velodrome once stood.

== History ==
On 4 February 1981 California State University Dominguez Hills was selected as the site of the Olympic velodrome. CSU Dominguez Hills President Don Gerth was eager to include the university in the ’84 Olympics. When Olympic Organizing Committee Chair Peter Ueberroth asked Gerth if he would like to have the Olympic velodrome, he replied, “We'll take it. What's a velodrome?”

On 9 July 1981 construction began on the Olympic velodrome, and it was completed on time and under budget prior to the 8 July 1982 dedication and 7-Eleven/Bicycling Magazine Grand Prix on July 9-10th, 1982. The 7-Eleven velodrome was one of only three permanent facilities built specifically for the 1984 Olympic Games. The track was 333.333 metres (1,093.61 ft) in length, 6 metres (20 ft) wide, banked at 33 degrees in the turns, 9 degrees on the straights, and was made of concrete. Prior to the Games, the track experienced small hairline cracks. These were fixed by an epoxy injection system and series of grinding to reduce bumps common to concrete tracks, and the track was coated with polyurethane prior to the Olympics for the fastest possible surface. Riders said the track was “smooth but sticky." Permanent stands were built to accommodate 2,000 spectators, but with temporary seating additions capacity for the Games was between 6,400 and 8,000. The Los Angeles developer and contractor Stolte Inc. built the velodrome for $3 million. Prior to the Games, the Olympic velodrome was one of the most requested venues for tours.

The 1984 Games was perhaps the most successful in USA Cycling history. It was also the first Olympics to have Women's Cycling. The LAOOC petitioned for Women's Individual Sprint and Pursuit events, but the requests were denied by the IOC. Connie Carpenter-Phinney and Rebecca Twigg took the Gold and Silver Medals in the 45 women field in the Individual road race, the first in Olympic history. On the track, Mark Gorski won the Individual Sprint Gold over ‘The Cheetah’ Nelson Vails in the all USA Final, and Steve Hegg won the 4000m Individual Pursuit. Altogether the US won a record 9 medals in cycling events.

== See also ==
- List of cycling tracks and velodromes
