= Thierry Détant =

Dutch cyclist

Thierry Detant
Personal information
- Full name: Thierry Roger Marc Détant
- Born: 23 November 1965 Amsterdam, Netherlands
- Height: 186 cm (6 ft 1 in)
- Weight: 78 kg (172 lb)

Cycling career
- Sport: Cycling
- Discipline: Track cycling

Thierry Roger Marc Détant (born 23 November 1965) competed as a track cyclist for the Netherlands at the 1988 Summer Olympics. Born in Amsterdam, he participated in the men's 1 km time trial, finishing 18th.

== See also ==
- List of Dutch Olympic cyclists
- List of people from Amsterdam
