= Hugo Daya =

Colombian cyclist

Personal information
- Born: 25 October 1963 (age 62)

Cycling career
- Sport: Cycling

Hugo Daya (born 25 October 1963) is a Colombian former cyclist. He competed in the sprint event at the 1984 Summer Olympics.
