= Eric Graveline =

Canadian windsurfer

Personal information
- Born: 29 July 1966 (age 60) Sainte-Geneviève-de-Batiscan, Quebec, Canada

Sport
- Sport: Windsurfing

Eric Graveline (born 29 July 1966) is a Canadian windsurfer. He competed in the Windglider event at the 1984 Summer Olympics.
