= Ken Klein Jr. =

United States Virgin Islands windsurfer

Personal information
- Full name: Kenneth C. Klein
- Nationality: American Virgin Islander
- Born: October 3, 1959 (age 65)
- Height: 179 cm (5 ft 10 in)
- Weight: 64 kg (141 lb)

Sport
- Sport: Windsurfing

Kenneth C. Klein (born October 3, 1959) is a windsurfer who represented the United States Virgin Islands. He competed in the Windglider event at the 1984 Summer Olympics.
