= Ian Stanley (cyclist) =

Jamaican cyclist

Personal information
- Born: 11 January 1963 (age 63)

Cycling career
- Sport: Cycling

Ian Stanley (born 11 January 1963) is a Jamaican former cyclist. He competed in the sprint and points race events at the 1984 Summer Olympics.
