= Alfredo Pelliccioni =

Sammarinese sports shooter

Personal information
- Nationality: Sammarinese
- Born: 21 June 1953 (age 73)

Sport
- Sport: Sports shooting

Alfredo Pelliccioni (born 21 June 1953) is a Sammarinese sports shooter. He competed at the 1976 Summer Olympics, the 1980 Summer Olympics and the 1984 Summer Olympics.

Outside of sport, he worked for the San Marino Social Security Institute.
