= Andrew Phillips (swimmer) =

Jamaican swimmer (born 1962)

Personal information
- Born: 17 April 1962 (age 64)

Sport
- Sport: Swimming

Andrew M. Phillips (born 17 April 1962) is a Jamaican swimmer. He competed in four events at the 1984 Summer Olympics.
