= Cynthia Green =

Jamaican sprinter (born 1960)

Personal information
- Nationality: Jamaican
- Born: 10 September 1960 (age 65)

Sport
- Sport: Sprinting
- Event: 400 metres

Cynthia Green (born 10 September 1960) is a Jamaican sprinter. She competed in the women's 400 metres at the 1984 Summer Olympics.

Competing for the Grambling State Tigers track and field team, Green won the 1985 500 meters at the NCAA Division I Indoor Track and Field Championships in a time of 1:10.46.
