= Rolf Morgan Hansen =

Norwegian cyclist

Personal information
- Born: 21 June 1961 (age 65) Sandefjord, Norway

Cycling career
- Sport: Cycling

Rolf Morgan Hansen (born 21 June 1961) is a Norwegian former cyclist. He competed in the 1000m time trial event at the 1984 Summer Olympics.
