= Max Rainsford =

Australian cyclist (born 1962)

Personal information
- Full name: Maxwell Charles Rainsford
- Born: 25 December 1962 (age 63)

Cycling career
- Sport: Cycling
Medal record
Men's road cycling
Representing Australia
Commonwealth Games
Bronze medal – third place	1986 Edinburgh	Time trial

Maxwell Charles 'Hollywood' Rainsford (born 25 December 1962) is an Australian former cyclist. He competed in the sprint and 1000m time trial events at the 1984 Summer Olympics.
