= Vincenzo Ceci =

Italian cyclist

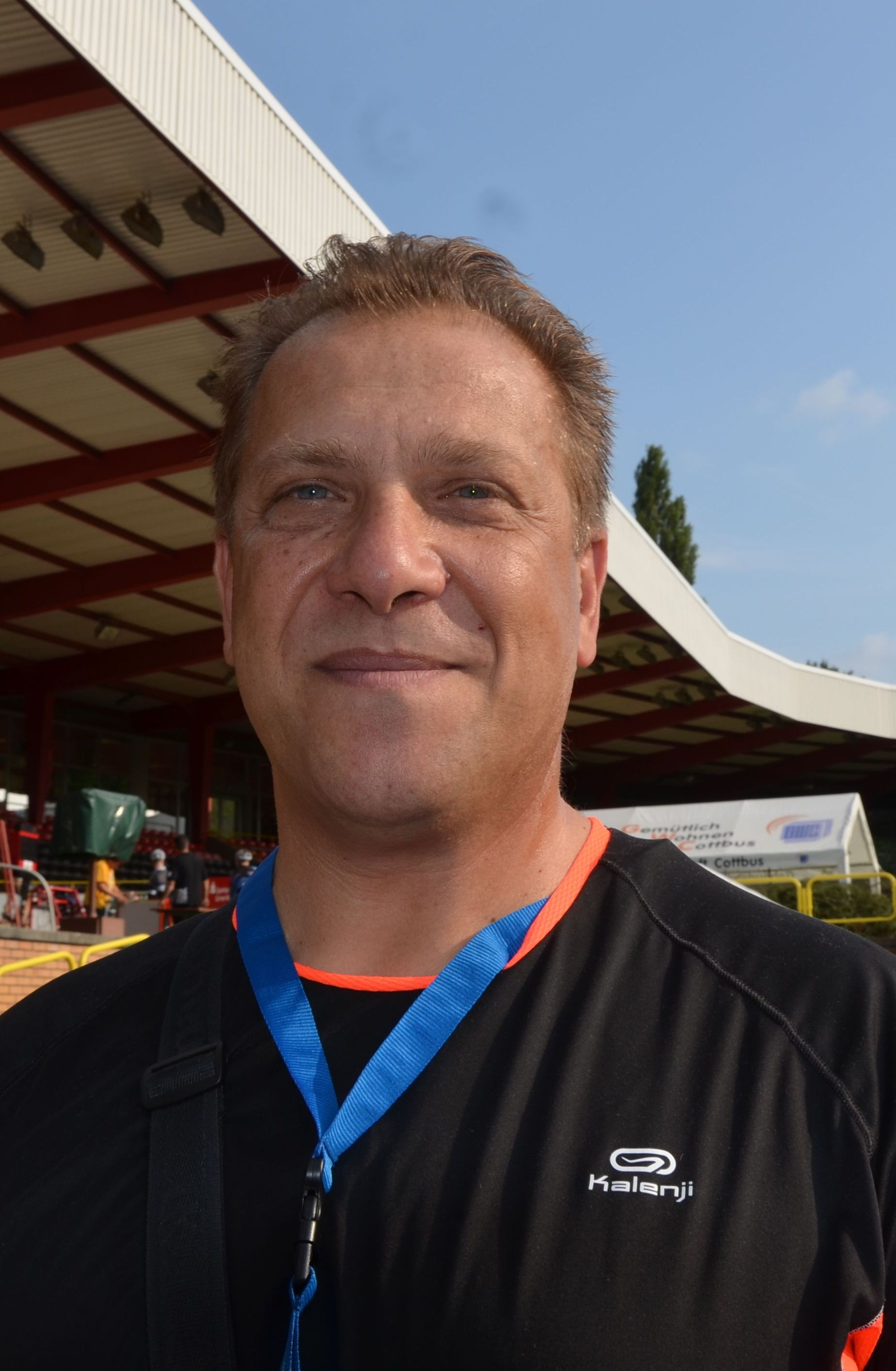
- Vincenzo Ceci in 2014

Personal information
- Born: 21 April 1964 (age 62) Ascoli Piceno, Italy

Cycling career
- Sport: Cycling

Vincenzo Ceci (born 21 April 1964) is an Italian former cyclist. He competed in the sprint event at the 1984 Summer Olympics.
