= Greg Hyde =

Australian windsurfer

Personal information
- Full name: Gregory Hyde
- Nationality: Australian
- Born: 18 March 1963 (age 62)
- Height: 175 cm (5 ft 9 in)
- Weight: 65 kg (143 lb)

Sport
- Sport: Windsurfing

Gregory "Greg" Hyde (born 18 March 1963) is an Australian windsurfer. He competed in the Windglider event at the 1984 Summer Olympics, finishing in 6th place.
