= Dirk Meyer (windsurfer) =

German windsurfer

Personal information
- Nationality: German
- Born: 9 July 1960 (age 64); Berlin, Germany

Sport
- Sport: Windsurfing

Dirk Meyer (born 9 July 1960) is a German windsurfer. He competed at the 1984 Summer Olympics and the 1988 Summer Olympics.
