= Fredy Schmidtke =

German track cyclist

Personal information
- Born: 1 July 1961 Worringen, Nordrhein-Westfalen, West Germany
- Died: 1 December 2017 (aged 56) Dormagen
- Height: 1.92 m (6 ft 4 in)
- Weight: 82 kg (181 lb)

Cycling career
- Sport: Cycling
- Discipline: Track
Medal record
Representing West Germany
Olympic Games
Gold medal – first place	1984 Los Angeles	1 km time trial
World Championships
Gold medal – first place	1982 Leicester	1 km time trial
Silver medal – second place	1981 Brno	1 km time trial

Fredy Schmidtke (1 July 1961 – 1 December 2017) was a German track cyclist. He won a gold medal in the 1000 metres time trial at the 1984 Summer Olympics and finished eighth in the sprint.

Schmidtke died of a heart attack on 1 December 2017, at the age of 56.
