= Fabrice Colas =

French cyclist (born 1964)

Personal information
- Born: 21 July 1964 (age 62) Rueil-Malmaison, France

Cycling career
- Sport: Cycling
Medal record
Men's cycling
Representing France
Olympic Games
Bronze medal – third place	1984 Los Angeles	1 km time trial
World Championships (Professional/Elite)
Silver medal – second place	1991 Stuttgart	Sprint
Bronze medal – third place	1991 Stuttgart	Keirin

Fabrice Colas (born 21 July 1964) is a retired French track cyclist who competed at the 1984 Summer Olympics in Los Angeles, winning a bronze medal in the 1000 metres time trial. He also competed at the 1988 Summer Olympics. Colas also won silver medal in the professional sprint and bronze in the keirin at the 1991 UCI Track Cycling World Championships.
