= Franck Dépine =

French cyclist

Personal information
- Born: 11 April 1959 (age 67) Lyon, France

Cycling career
- Sport: Cycling

Franck Dépine (born 11 April 1959) is a French former cyclist. He competed in the sprint event at the 1984 Summer Olympics.
