= Oleksandr Kyrychenko =

Ukrainian cyclist (born 1967)

Personal information
- Born: 13 August 1967 (age 59) Kyiv, Ukrainian SSR, Soviet Union

Cycling career
- Sport: Cycling
Medal record
Men's cycling
Representing Soviet Union
Olympic Games
Gold medal – first place	1988 Seoul	1 km time trial
World Championships (Amateur)
Gold medal – first place	1990 Maebashi	1 km time trial
Bronze medal – third place	1989 Lyon	1 km time trial

Oleksandr Oleksandrovych Kyrychenko (born 13 August 1967) is a Ukrainian track cyclist. He won the gold medal in the 1 km time trial at the 1988 Summer Olympics, competing for the Soviet Union. The first coach for Olympics was Oleksandr Kulyk, which fell in battle in 2022 during the Russian invasion of Ukraine.
