= Katsuo Nakatake =

Japanese cyclist

Personal information
- Born: 28 March 1964 (age 62) Osaka, Japan

Cycling career
- Sport: Cycling

Katsuo Nakatake (中武 克雄, Nakatake Katsuo; born 28 March 1964) is a Japanese former cyclist. He competed in the sprint event at the 1984 Summer Olympics. He is also a professional keirin cyclist with more than 300 wins.
