= Flavio Pelliccioni =

Sammarinese windsurfer (born 1956)

Personal information
- Nationality: Sammarinese
- Born: 18 March 1956 (age 70) Monte Colombo, Italy
- Height: 178 cm (5 ft 10 in)
- Weight: 68 kg (150 lb)

Sport
- Sport: Windsurfing

Flavio Pelliccioni (born 18 March 1956) is an Italian–born Sammarinese windsurfer. He competed in the Windglider event at the 1984 Summer Olympics.
