= Carlon Blackman =

Barbadian sprinter (born 1965)

Personal information
- Nationality: Barbadian
- Born: 27 March 1965 (age 61)

Sport
- Sport: Sprinting
- Event: 400 metres

Carlon Blackman (born 27 March 1965) is a Barbadian sprinter. She competed in the women's 400 metres at the 1984 Summer Olympics in Los Angeles, finishing in sixth place in her first-round heat, with a time of 54.26.

Blackman competed for the Drake Bulldogs track and field team in the NCAA.
