= Gordon Scarlett =

Jamaican swimmer (born 1967)

Personal information
- Born: 17 August 1967 (age 58)

Sport
- Sport: Swimming

Gordon Scarlett (born 17 August 1967) is a Jamaican swimmer. He competed in three events at the 1984 Summer Olympics.
