= Leon Richardson =

Antiguan cyclist (born 1957)

Personal information
- Born: 12 February 1957 (age 69)

Cycling career
- Sport: Cycling

Leonard “Leon” Richardson (born 12 February 1957) is an Antiguan former cyclist. He competed in the sprint and 1000m time trial events at the 1984 Summer Olympics.
