= Scott Steele =

American sailor (born 1958)

Personal information
- Born: February 26, 1958 (age 68) Newport, Rhode Island, U.S.

Sailing career
- Sport: Sailing
- College team: St. Mary's College of Maryland
Medal record
Men's sailing
Representing the United States
Olympic Games
Silver medal – second place	1984 Los Angeles	Windglider

Randall Scott Steele (born February 26, 1958) is an American competitive sailor, World Champion (Windsurfer) and Olympic Silver Medalist (Yachting/Sailing/Windglider)

== Career ==
At the 1984 Summer Olympics, Steele finished in 2nd place in the men's Windglider sailing/windsurfing competition.

Prior to that, he was honored as a two-time All American Intercollegiate sailor while at St. Mary's College of Maryland. Scott was the first All American from St. Mary's along with his teammate in 1979, Monty Spindler, and was honored into the St. Mary's College of Maryland Hall of Fame in 1990. While at St. Mary's, Scott learned how to Windsurf from his brother Ron, and helped bring Windsurfing to St. Mary's. Around his Intercollegiate sailing schedule for St. Mary's, Scott occasionally attended a Windsurfing competition but remained a sailor first through his college years. Upon graduating college, Windsurfing (commonly referred to as Boardsailing at the time) was simultaneously named as a new Olympic sport. The timing was good so he tried out and made the US Boardsailing Team. His first job out of college was with Mark Lindsay Imports (who was importer of the Olympic Class Windglider) a perfect match. In the Fall of 1981, Scott attended the Windglider World's in Palamos, Spain and finished 4th out of over 100 competitors marking the beginning of an Olympic campaign as a US Boardsailing team member under Coach Major Hall. Scott finished in the top 10 of the Windglider World's each year after that, 1982 (8th place, Messina, Italy) and 1983 (9th place, Bermuda).

Also, racing the Windsurfer brand sailboard, Scott won both his class in the 1982 American Championship (San Diego), and the 1983 Windsurfer World Championships (Kingston, Ontario) with several hundred competitors in each. Over this time, Scott competed successfully in many other sailboard classes including the highly competitive Mistral class. Mistral Windsurfing became a supporter of Scott and eventually his employer. Scott had impressive results racing the Mistral Class winning Midwinter and National Championships as well as a 4th in the 1983 Mistral World's (Barbados), and 5th at the 1984 Mistral World's (Sousse, Tunisia). The 1984 Olympic year, he was challenged fiercely at the US Olympic Trials as only 1 competitor per country could earn the right to compete at the Olympic Games . It was a hurdle that Scott cleared but was pushed extremely hard by his US challengers (held at the eventual Olympic competition site in Long Beach, CA).

Going into the 1984 Summer Olympics, Scott chose to train in Corpus Christi, TX with US training partners as well as the New Zealand Olympic entry, Bruce Kendall (eventual winner of 2 Olympic Medals, Bronze '84, Gold '88). Although not favored to win Medals, both Scott (Silver) and Bruce (Bronze) proved that their training together produced Olympic Medals! Afterwards, Scott worked closely in a variety of ways with Mistral Windsurfing, did advertising campaign's for Chanel and others as well as becoming a consultant coach for upcoming Olympic aspirants. He tried a comeback for another Olympics, doing well by finishing 2nd at the 1987 Pre-Olympics in Pusan, Korea but in the 1988 US Olympic Trials, he did not qualify and instead coached the U.S. representative (an eventual Bronze Medalist), Mike Gebhardt, at the 1988 Summer Olympics. Scott continued to coach for US Sailing (whenever possible) while also working with Mistral through the early 90's. His life revolved around helping the US team and himself prepare for the upcoming Olympic Games, and competed in the 1990 Goodwill Games (as the U.S. representative) finishing with another Silver Medal. He was recognized that year for his Sportsmanship in the event whereby he witnessed for the eventual Gold Medalist from Poland. He earned US Sailing's Van Alan Clark Sportmanship Award (for all sailors), as well as being nominated for the Jack Kelly Fair Play and James Sullivan award (for all US athletes). Later in his third quadrennium, Scott went to another Pre-Olympic competition against the World's best and finished with another 2nd place finish (1991 Barcelona- site of the 1992 Summer Olympics). The 1992 US Trials (Ft. Pierce, FL) proved to be a highly competitive event that Mike Gebhardt would eventually win. Mike would finish with a Silver in the Barcelona Olympic Games. After those years and Scott began having children, while he coached the Georgetown University Sailing Team in the 90's, worked for Vanguard Sailboats from 1997 to 2007 then after a brief stint wholesaling sails, entered retail sail making with Ullman Sails. He continues to coach sailing, helping sailors of all levels!

== Early life ==
Son of Navy Captain Marshall K. Steele Jr and Elsie (Miller) Steele, Scott was born at the Newport, RI Naval Hospital prior to moving to Annapolis, MD. In Annapolis, he lived on the Naval Academy grounds in the Captain quarters from age 2-10 prior to his father retiring from the Navy after 26 years of service. As the youngest in his family to older brothers Marshall Steele III, Ronald Steele and sister Janette Steele (Nyce), he became an excellent sailor as a junior winning numerous competitions in Penquins, Lasers, 420's as well as on his families keelboats. He attended Severn School (76' graduate, Severna Park, MD), then St. Mary's College of Maryland where he excelled at sailing on the schools nationally ranked sailing team. He married Kathleen Kip in 1981, (divorced in 1987). He remarried in 1991 to Gretchen Lamon and had 5 children (Scotty, Chris, Brendan, Caroline and Patrick). The boys all went to school at Severna Park HS, while Caroline graduated in 2015 from her fathers alma mater, Severn School. Almost all learned to sail, but found Lacrosse and were standout athletes in high school and college. Brendan graduated from St. Mary's College of Maryland (Scott's alma mater) in 2017 where he played Lacrosse.
