= Tsutomu Sato (windsurfer) =

Japanese windsurfer

Personal information
- Nationality: Japanese
- Born: 18 December 1960 (age 64)

Sport
- Sport: Windsurfing

Tsutomu Sato (佐藤 務, Satō Tsutomu, born 18 December 1960) is a Japanese windsurfer. He competed in the Windglider event at the 1984 Summer Olympics.
