= Anthony Henry (athlete) =

Antigua and Barbuda sprinter

Personal information
- Nationality: Antigua and Barbuda
- Born: 9 January 1967 (age 59)

Sport
- Sport: Sprinting
- Event: 100 metres

Anthony Henry (born 9 January 1967) is an Antigua and Barbuda sprinter. He competed in the men's 100 metres at the 1984 Summer Olympics.
