= Brian Lyn =

Antiguan cyclist

Personal information
- Born: 8 November 1961 (age 64)

Cycling career
- Sport: Cycling

Brian Lyn (born 8 November 1961) is an Antiguan former cyclist. He competed in the sprint event at the 1984 Summer Olympics.
