= Miroslav Vymazal =

Czech cyclist

Personal information
- Born: 9 April 1952 Brno, Czechoslovakia
- Died: 18 October 2002 (aged 50) Bratislava, Slovakia

Cycling career
- Sport: Cycling

Miroslav Vymazal (9 April 1952 – 18 October 2002) was a Czech cyclist. He competed in the 1000m time trial event at the 1976 Summer Olympics.

In 1976, Vymazal competed in the sprint at the Summer Olympics in Montreal and finished ninth. A start in the tandem race was not possible, as this discipline had been removed from the Olympic programme after 1972. He was also successful as an individual competitor in track sprinting, twice winning the prestigious Grand Prix Framar in the Czech Republic. Several times he won titles at the national track championships. He became a title holder in the sprint in 1982, on the tandem he won in 1973, as well as from 1977 to 1979 with his standard partner Vladimír Vačkář, and in the 1000-metre time trial he became Czech champion in 1974.
