= Murray Steele =

New Zealander cyclist (born 1961)

Personal information
- Born: 16 July 1961 (age 65) Ranfurly, New Zealand

Cycling career
- Sport: Cycling

Murray Allan Steele (born 16 July 1961) is a New Zealand cyclist. He competed in the sprint event at the 1984 Summer Olympics.
