= Maic Malchow =

German cyclist

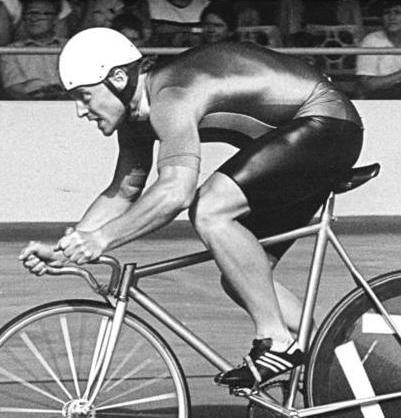
- Maic Malchow in 1988

Personal information
- Born: 11 October 1962 (age 64) Borna, East Germany

Cycling career
- Sport: Cycling
Medal record
Men's track cycling
Representing East Germany
World Championships (Amateur)
Gold medal – first place	1986 Colorado Springs	1 km time trial

Maic Malchow (born 11 October 1962) is a German former cyclist. He competed in the 1 km time trial event at the 1988 Summer Olympics.
