= Claudio Iannone =

Argentinian cyclist

Personal information
- Born: 5 November 1963 (age 62)

Cycling career
- Sport: Cycling

Claudio Iannone (born 5 November 1963) is an Argentine former cyclist. He competed in the sprint event at the 1984 Summer Olympics.
