= Deryck Marks =

Jamaican swimmer (born 1963)

Personal information
- Born: 30 October 1963 (age 62)

Sport
- Sport: Swimming

Deryck Marks (born 30 October 1963) is a Jamaican swimmer. He competed in four events at the 1984 Summer Olympics.
