= Saint Vincent Passage =

- Location within the Caribbean
- Coordinates: 13°30′N 61°00′W
- Basin countries: Saint Lucia; Saint Vincent and the Grenadines
- Max. length: 4.5 miles (7.2 km) ~ 10 miles (16 km)
- Max. width: 23 miles (37 km)

Saint Vincent Passage is a strait in the Caribbean that separates Saint Lucia and Saint Vincent. It is a pathway between Caribbean Sea and Atlantic Ocean.

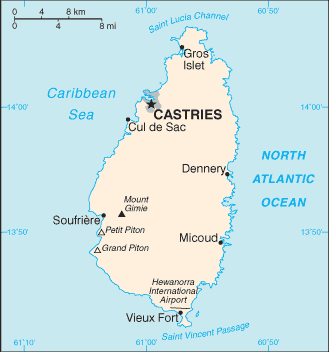
Saint Lucia with the Saint Vincent Passage at the bottom.

Location between Saint Lucia and Saint Vincent

== See also ==
- Saint Lucia Channel
