= Philippe Vernet =

French cyclist

Personal information
- Born: 19 May 1961 (age 65) Le Raincy, France

Cycling career
- Sport: Cycling

Philippe Vernet (born 19 May 1961) is a French former cyclist. He competed in the sprint event at the 1984 Summer Olympics.
