= Nelson Vails =

American cyclist

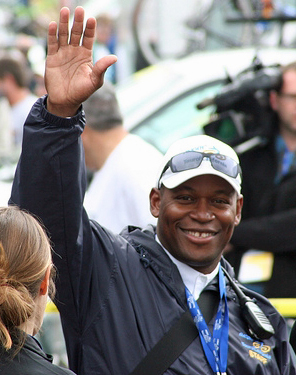
- Vails in February 2007

Personal information
- Born: October 13, 1960 (age 66) Harlem, New York

Cycling career
- Sport: Cycling
Medal record
Men's cycling
Representing United States
Olympic Games
Silver medal – second place	1984 Los Angeles	Individual Sprint
Pan American Games
Gold medal – first place	1983 Caracas	Individual Sprint

Nelson Beasley Vails (born October 13, 1960) is a retired road and track cyclist from the United States. He rode as a professional from 1988 to 1995 representing the U.S. at the 1984 Summer Olympics in Los Angeles, California, where he became the first African American and first person of African descent to win an Olympic medal in cycling. He won the silver medal in the sprint, behind countryman Mark Gorski. He was inducted to the U.S. Bicycle Hall of Fame in 2009.

Vails was also seen as a New York bicycle messenger in the film Quicksilver. He didn't just play a bicycle messenger in "Quicksilver," he worked as one in New York City. His nickname was "The Cheetah." After his sporting career he has worked as a cycling commentator for major TV networks and taken part in cycling safety programs.

In 2005 Vails was inducted into the Lehigh Valley Velodrome Cycling Hall of Fame.

== Palmarès ==
1983
1st Pan American Games, individual sprint
1984
2nd Olympic Games, sprint
1st US National Track Champion, individual sprint
1st US National Track Champion, tandem sprint
1985
2nd Track World Champion, tandem sprint
1st US National Track Champion, tandem sprint
1986
1st US National Track Champion, tandem sprint
