= James Joseph (cyclist) =

Guyanese cyclist

Personal information
- Born: 11 May 1957 (age 69)

Cycling career
- Sport: Cycling

James Joseph (born 11 May 1957) is a Guyanese cyclist, specializing in track cycling match sprinting. 9th overall in match sprints in the 1980 Summer Olympics and competed in match sprints in the 1984 Summer Olympics In October 2017, Joseph set the 200m Flying Start world record of 11.42 seconds at the International Cycling Union (UCI) World Masters Championship in California, USA.
