= Paulo Jamur =

Brazilian cyclist

Personal information
- Born: 17 December 1964 (age 61)

Cycling career
- Sport: Cycling

Paulo Jamur (born 17 December 1964) is a Brazilian former cyclist. He competed at the 1984 Summer Olympics and the 1988 Summer Olympics.
