= Mika Hämäläinen =

Finnish cyclist

Personal information
- Born: 15 March 1967 (age 59) Helsinki, Finland

Cycling career
- Sport: Cycling

Mika Hämäläinen (born 15 March 1967) is a Finnish former cyclist. He competed at the 1988 Summer Olympics and the 1992 Summer Olympics.
