= Tsutomu Sakamoto =

Japanese racing cyclist

Personal information
- Born: 3 August 1962 (age 64) Nanbu, Japan

Cycling career
- Sport: Cycling
Medal record
Men's cycling
Representing Japan
Olympic Games
Bronze medal – third place	1984 Los Angeles	Individual sprint

Tsutomu Sakamoto (坂本 勉, Sakamoto Tsutomu) (born 3 August 1962) is a racing cyclist from Japan. He competed for Japan in the 1984 Summer Olympics held in Los Angeles, United States in the individual sprint event, where he finished in third place.
