= Max Leiva =

Guatemalan cyclist

Personal information
- Born: 17 January 1966 (age 60)

Cycling career
- Sport: Cycling

Max Leiva (born 17 January 1966) is a Guatemalan former cyclist. He competed at the 1984 Summer Olympics and the 1988 Summer Olympics.
