= Windglider =

Olympic windsurfer design

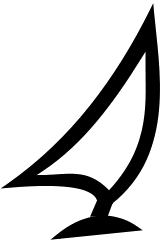
- Class symbol

Development
- Designer: Fred Ostermann
- Year: 1976
- Design: One Design

Boat
- Crew: 1

Hull
- Type: Sailboard
- LOA: 3.9 m (13 ft)
- Beam: 0.65 m (2 ft 2 in)

Sails
- Mainsail area: 6.5 m^{2} (70 sq ft)

For the 1984 Los Angeles Olympics, the Olympic board choice was between the original Windsurfer One Design manufactured by Hoyle Schweitzer and the Windglider designed by Fred Ostermann and made in Europe by Dufour. The Windglider was chosen late in 1983 based on it being more 'one design' as the Windsurfer was made of polyethylene and its rocker could be easily changed with heat and weight on a daily basis.

== Description ==
The Windglider used a 6.5 m^{2} (70 sq ft) sail but the use of a harness was not permitted. The daggerboard weighed around 4 kilograms (8.8 lb) and was carried over the sailor's shoulder during the downwind legs. The 1984 Olympic course of nine nautical miles put a premium on the competitors strength and fitness.

The supplied equipment was rotated daily (except for the rigs).

The Windglider was designed by the German Fred Osterman

== See also ==
- Windsurfing
- Sailing at the 1984 Summer Olympics – Windglider Male

Year	Gold	Silver	Bronze
1984 Los Angeles	Netherlands (NED); Stephan van den Berg	United States (USA); Scott Steele	New Zealand (NZL); Bruce Kendall
