= Gabriele Sella =

Italian cyclist

Personal information
- Born: 15 April 1963 Cavarzere, Italy
- Died: 2 June 2010 (aged 47) Fasana, Italy

Cycling career
- Sport: Cycling

Gabriele Sella (15 April 1963 – 2 June 2010) was an Italian cyclist. He competed in the sprint event at the 1984 Summer Olympics.
