= Heinz Isler (cyclist) =

Swiss cyclist

Personal information
- Born: 19 February 1960 (age 66) Zurich, Switzerland

Cycling career
- Sport: Cycling

Heinz Isler (born 19 February 1960) is a Swiss former cyclist. He competed at the 1980 Summer Olympics and the 1984 Summer Olympics.
