= Marcelo Alexandre =

Argentine cyclist

Personal information
- Born: 22 January 1963 (age 63) Buenos Aires, Argentina

Cycling career
- Sport: Cycling

Marcelo Alexandre (born 22 January 1963) is an Argentine former cyclist. He competed at the 1984 Summer Olympics and the 1988 Summer Olympics.
