= Mark Gorski =

American cyclist (born 1960)

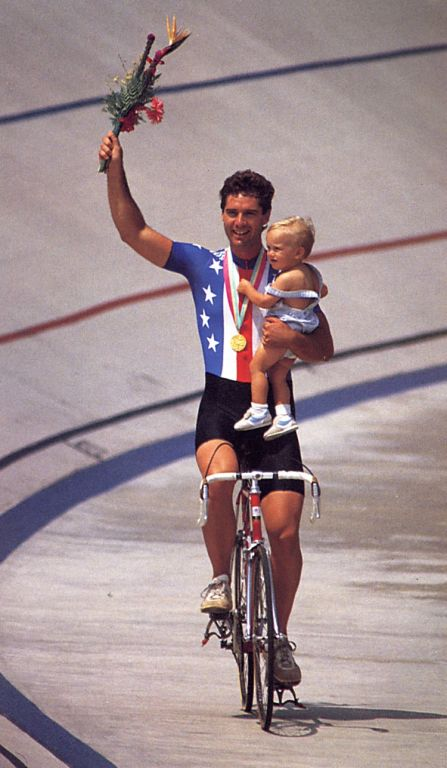
- Gorski at the 1984 Summer Olympics

Personal information
- Full name: Mark Brian Gorski
- Born: 6 January 1960 (age 66) Evanston, Illinois, U.S.

Cycling career
- Sport: Cycling
- Discipline: Track Cycling
Medal record
Men's cycling
Representing United States
Olympic Games
Gold medal – first place	1984 Los Angeles	Individual sprint
Pan American Games
Silver medal – second place	1987 Indianapolis	Individual sprint

Mark Brian Gorski (born January 6, 1960) is a 1984 Olympic Gold medal-winning cyclist in the 1000m match sprint from the United States. He attended Lake Park High School in Roselle, Illinois and the University of Michigan.

Gorski was a member of the 1980, 1984 and 1988 Olympic Teams and won a gold medal in the 1984 Olympics in Los Angeles in the 1000 meter sprint cycling event. He was inducted into the U.S. Cycling Hall of Fame in 1995. He served as a commentator for NBC at the 1992 Olympics in Barcelona and has done numerous speaking engagements over the past 20 years. Gorski attended the University of Michigan from 1978 to 1982.

Gorski lives in Indian Wells, California. He is a Senior Vice President at Wexford Science & Technology, where he leads the leasing activities in its West region markets. Gorski has held leasing and development positions with Wexford since May 2009. Over the past 33 years, Gorski has held management positions in marketing and sales roles with Wells Fargo Bank, Sister to Sister Foundation, Montgomery Sports and Tailwind Sports.
