= Lee Fu-hsiang =

Taiwanese cyclist

Personal information
- Full name: 李 福祥 Pinyin: Lǐ Fú-xiáng
- Born: 17 February 1960 (age 66)

Cycling career
- Sport: Cycling

Lee Fu-hsiang (born 17 February 1960) is a Taiwanese former cyclist. He competed at the 1984 Summer Olympics and the 1988 Summer Olympics.
