= Cycling at the 1980 Summer Olympics =

Cycling at the Games of the XXII Olympiad
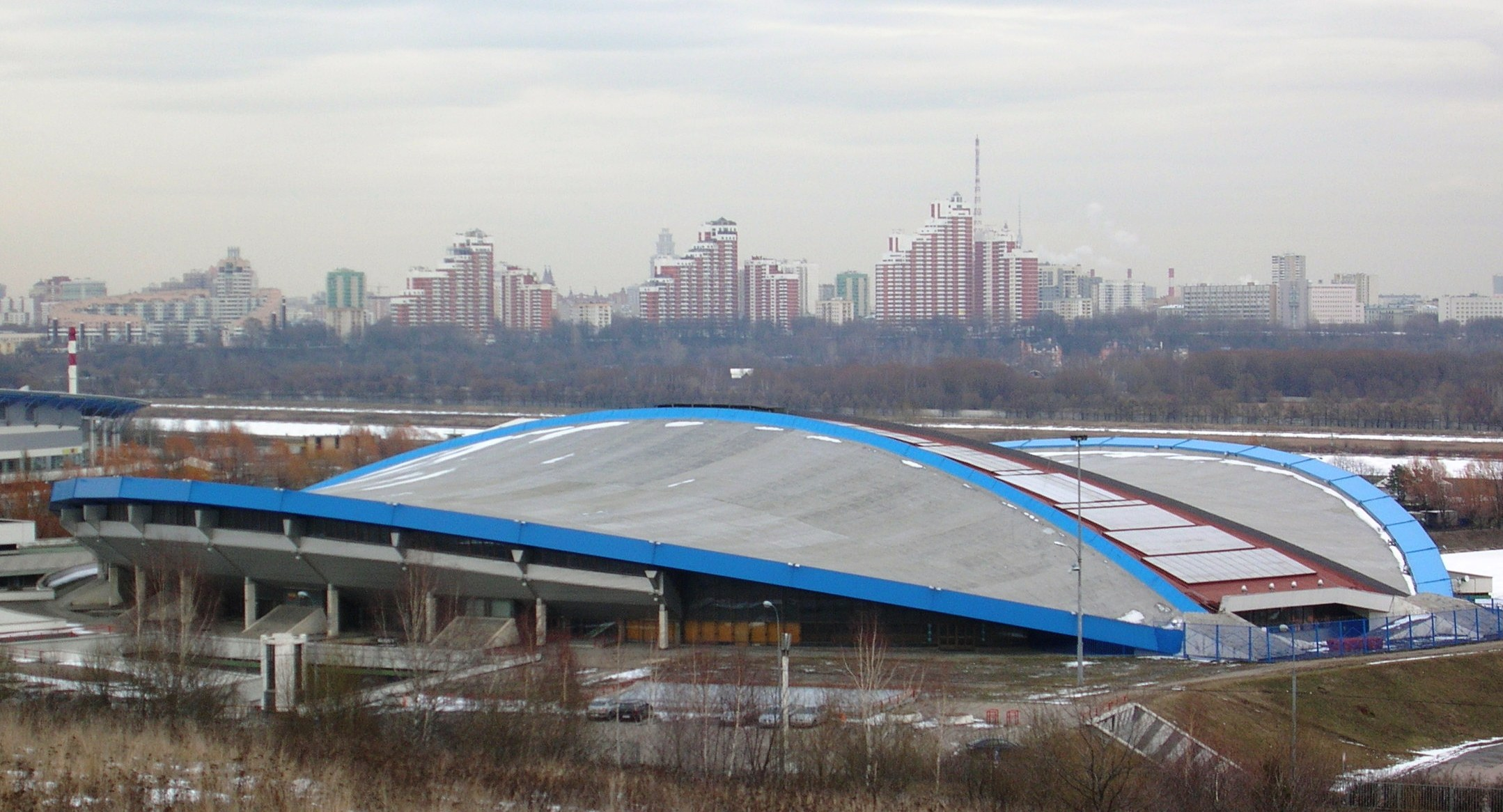
- Krylatskoye Velodrome in 2008
- Venues: Krylatskoye Sports Complex Cycling Circuit; Krylatskoye Sports Complex Velodrome
- Date: 20–28 July 1980
- Competitors: 230 from 34 nations

Cycling competitions at the 1980 Summer Olympics were split into two categories: road and track. Six events were contested (all for men). All four events of the track cycling were held at the Velodrome of the Trade Unions Olympic Sports Centre (Krylatskoye district, Moscow). The 100 km team time trial event was held along the Moscow-Minsk highway. It started from 23rd kilometre off Moscow, had a turning point at 73.5 kilometre off Moscow and finished not far from the starting point. The individual road race event (14 laps, 189 kilometres total) was held at the Olympic Cycling Circuit of the Trade Unions Olympic Centre.

Women's cycling was not part of the programme for the last time, being introduced in 1984.

== Medal summary ==
=== Road cycling ===
Games	Gold	Silver	Bronze
Individual road race	Sergei Sukhoruchenkov; Soviet Union	Czesław Lang; Poland	Yuri Barinov; Soviet Union
Team time trial	Soviet Union; Yury Kashirin; Oleg Logvin; Sergei Shelpakov; Anatoly Yarkin	East Germany; Falk Boden; Bernd Drogan; Olaf Ludwig; Hans-Joachim Hartnick	Czechoslovakia; Michal Klasa; Vlastibor Konečný; Alipi Kostadinov; Jiří Škoda

=== Track cycling ===
Games	Gold	Silver	Bronze
Individual pursuit	Robert Dill-Bundi; Switzerland	Alain Bondue; France	Hans-Henrik Ørsted; Denmark
Team pursuit	Soviet Union; Viktor Manakov; Valery Movchan; Vladimir Osokin; Vitaly Petrakov; Aleksandr Krasnov	East Germany; Gerald Mortag; Uwe Unterwalder; Matthias Wiegand; Volker Winkler	Czechoslovakia; Teodor Černý; Martin Penc; Jiří Pokorný; Igor Sláma
Sprint	Lutz Heßlich; East Germany	Yavé Cahard; France	Sergei Kopylov; Soviet Union
1 km time trial	Lothar Thoms; East Germany	Aleksandr Panfilov; Soviet Union	David Weller; Jamaica

== Participating nations ==
230 cyclists from 34 nations competed.

- Australia (10)
- Austria (6)
- Belgium (12)
- Brazil (6)
- Bulgaria (6)
- Cameroon (6)
- Cuba (3)
- Czechoslovakia (11)
- Denmark (11)

- East Germany (13)
- Ecuador (4)
- Ethiopia (8)
- Finland (5)
- France (9)
- Great Britain (12)
- Guyana (2)
- Hungary (10)

- Ireland (3)
- Italy (10)
- Jamaica (2)
- Lebanon (2)
- Libya (7)
- Malta (4)
- Mongolia (5)
- Netherlands (7)
- Poland (11)

- Romania (2)
- San Marino (2)
- Soviet Union (13)
- Sweden (6)
- Switzerland (10)
- Venezuela (5)
- Yugoslavia (4)
- Zimbabwe (3)

== Medal table ==
Rank	Nation	Gold	Silver	Bronze	Total
1	Soviet Union	3	1	2	6
2	East Germany	2	2	0	4
3	Switzerland	1	0	0	1
4	France	0	2	0	2
5	Poland	0	1	0	1
6	Czechoslovakia	0	0	2	2
7	Denmark	0	0	1	1
7	Jamaica	0	0	1	1
Totals (8 entries)		6	6	6	18
