= Cycling at the Friendship Games =

The cycling competition at the Friendship Games consisted of two road cycling and five track cycling events (all men's). The individual road race was held at the Schleizer Dreieck race track in Schleiz, East Germany on 23 August 1984, the team road race was held in Forst, East Germany on 26 August 1984, while track cycling events were held at the Velodrome of the Trade Unions Olympic Sports Centre in Moscow, Soviet Union between 18 and 22 August 1984.

== Medal summary ==
=== Road cycling ===
Event	Gold		Silver		Bronze	
Men's road race	Alexandr Zinovyev (URS)	4:44.21	Uwe Raab (GDR)	4:44.21	Andrzej Mierzejewski (POL)	4:44.21
Men's team road race	East Germany (GDR); Uwe Ampler; Falk Boden; Bernd Drogan; Mario Kummer	2:01.35	Soviet Union (URS); Sergei Navolokin; Alexandr Zinovyev; Yevgeniy Korolkov; Asiat Saitov	2:01.46	Czechoslovakia (TCH); Milan Křen; Milan Jurčo; Vlastibor Konečný; Michal Klasa	2:03.54

=== Track cycling ===
Event	Gold		Silver		Bronze	
Points race (50 km)	Miklós Somogyi (HUN)	81 points	Martin Penc (TCH)	77 points	Jonas Romanovas (URS)	73 points
Individual pursuit (4 km)	Gintautas Umaras (URS)	4:33.66	Bernd Dittert (GDR)	4:33.88	Ryszard Dawidowicz (POL)	4:40.21
Team pursuit (4 km)	East Germany (GDR); Bernd Dittert; Mario Hernig; Volker Winkler; Carsten Wolf; Gerald Mortag		Soviet Union (URS); Marat Ganeyev; Aleksandr Krasnov; Valery Movchan; Vasily Shpundov		Czechoslovakia (TCH); Teodor Černý; František Raboň; Aleš Trčka; Pavel Soukup; František Klouček	
Sprint	Lutz Heßlich (GDR)		Sergei Kopylov (URS)		Vratislav Šustr (TCH)	
1 km time trial	Sergei Kopylov (URS)	1:03.56	Maic Malchov (GDR)	1:04.17	Milan Hájek (TCH)	1:05.67

== Medal table ==
* Host nation (Soviet Union)

Rank	Nation	Gold	Silver	Bronze	Total
1	Soviet Union (URS)*	3	3	1	7
2	East Germany (GDR)*	3	3	0	6
3	Hungary (HUN)	1	0	0	1
4	Czechoslovakia (TCH)	0	1	4	5
5	Poland (POL)	0	0	2	2
Totals (5 entries)		7	7	7	21

== See also ==
- Cycling at the 1984 Summer Olympics
