= Venues of the 1980 Summer Olympics =

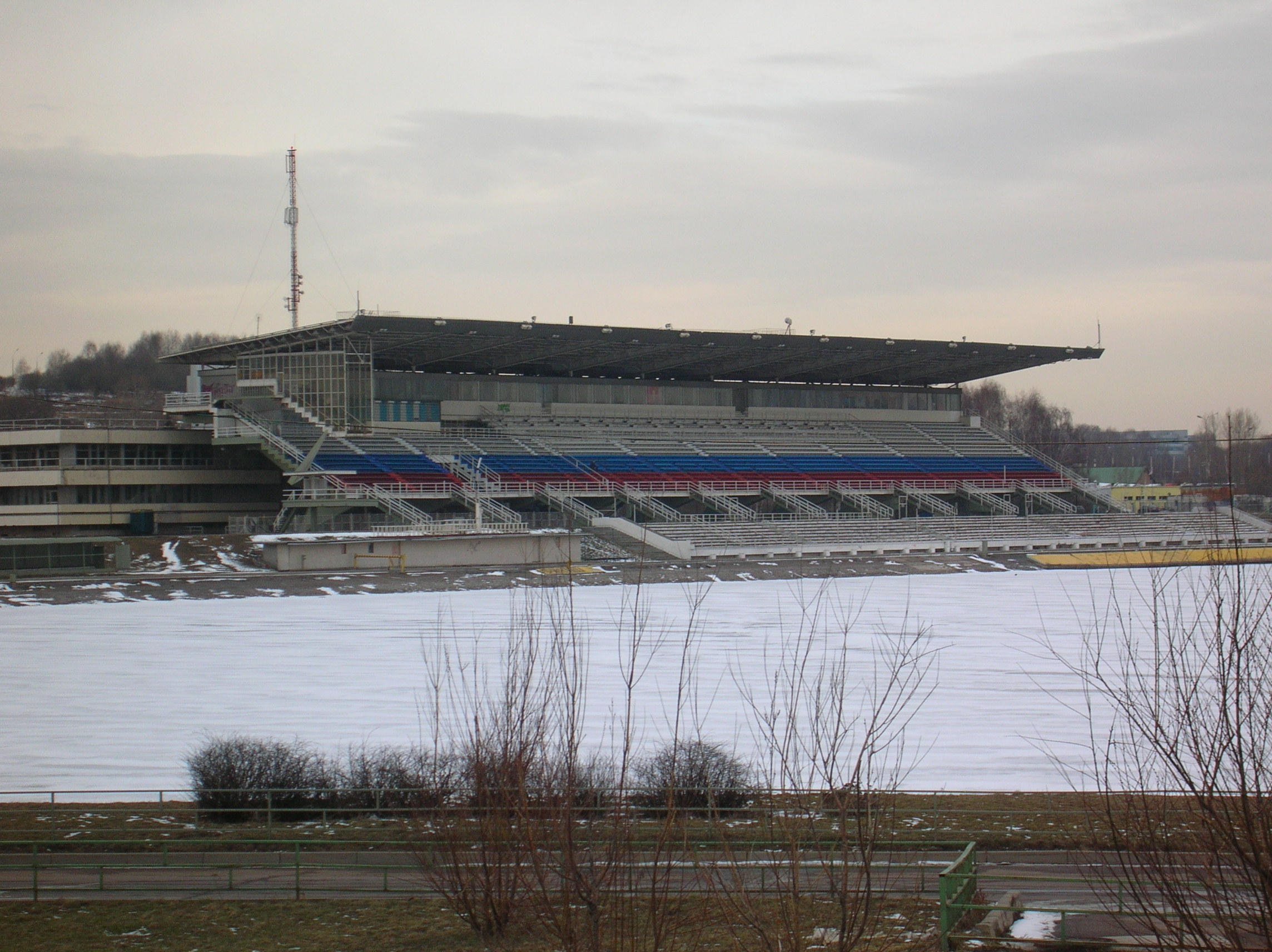
The Krylatskoye Canoeing and Rowing Basin venue in March 2008. It hosted the canoeing and rowing competitions for the 1980 Summer Olympics.

For the 1980 Summer Olympics, a total of twenty-eight sports venues were used. The first venue used for the Games was built in 1923. With the creation of the Spartakiad in Moscow in 1928, more venues were constructed. Central Lenin Stadium Grand Arena was built in 1956 for that year's versions of the Spartkiad. A plan in 1971 to construct more sports venues by 1990 was initiated, but accelerated in 1974 when Moscow was awarded the 1980 Games. The new venues to be used for the Games were completed in 1979. During the Games themselves at the permanent road cycling venue, the first ever constructed, the largest margin of victory was recorded in the individual road race cycling event since 1928. The Grand Arena hosted the football final that was played in a rainstorm for the third straight Olympics. After the 1991 break of the Soviet Union, the venues in Kiev, Minsk, and Tallinn would be located in Ukraine, Belarus, and Estonia, respectively. Luzhniki Stadium, formerly Grand Arena, continues to be used, and it was affected by the Luzhniki disaster in 1982. The stadium served as host for the IAAF World Championships in Athletics in 2013. Another venue, the Moscow Canoeing and Rowing Basin, served as host to the ICF Canoe Sprint World Championships in 2014. In December 2010, Russia was awarded the 2018 FIFA World Cup with Luzhniki Stadium and Dynamo Stadium proposed as venues for those events.

== Venues ==
=== Central Lenin Stadium Area ===
Venue	Sports	Capacity	Ref.
Druzhba Multipurpose Arena	Volleyball	3,900	
Grand Arena	Athletics, Equestrian (jumping individual), Football (final), Opening/closing ceremonies	91,251	
Minor Arena	Volleyball (final)	8,512	
Swimming Pool	Water polo	10,500	
Sports Palace	Gymnastics, Judo	13,766	
Streets of Moscow	Athletics (20 km/ 50 km walk, marathon)	Not listed.	

=== Olympiysky Sports Complex ===
Venue	Sports	Capacity	Ref.
Indoor Stadium	Basketball (final), Boxing	33,970	
Swimming Pool	Diving, Modern pentathlon (swimming), Swimming, Water polo (final)	13,000	

=== CSKA Area ===
Venue	Sports	Capacity	Ref.
CSKA Athletics Fieldhouse	Wrestling	8,500	
CSKA Football Fieldhouse	Fencing, Modern pentathlon (fencing)	8,500	
CSKA Palace of Sports	Basketball	5,500	

=== Dynamo Stadium ===
Venue	Sports	Capacity	Ref.
Dynamo Central Stadium, Grand Arena	Football	50,475	
Dynamo Central Stadium, Minor Arena	Field hockey	8,000	
Dynamo Palace of Sports	Handball	5,000	

=== Krylatskoye Park ===
Venue	Sports	Capacity	Ref.
Krylatskoye Sports Complex Archery Field	Archery	3,000	
Krylatskoye Sports Complex Canoeing and Rowing Basin	Canoeing, Rowing	21,600	
Krylatskoye Sports Complex Cycling Circuit	Cycling (individual road race)	4,267	
Krylatskoye Sports Complex Velodrome	Cycling (track)	6,000	

=== Other venues in Moscow ===
Venue	Sports	Capacity	Ref.
Trade Unions' Equestrian Complex	Equestrian (all but jumping individual), Modern pentathlon (riding, running)	12,000 (jumping); 3,000 (dressage); 2,000 (indoor arena); 400 (eventing endurance)	
Young Pioneers Stadium	Field hockey (final)	5,000	
Dynamo Shooting Range	Modern pentathlon (shooting), Shooting	2,330	
Izmailovo Sports Palace	Weightlifting	5,000	
Sokolniki Sports Palace	Handball (final)	6,800	

=== Football venues ===
Venue	Sports	Capacity	Ref.
Dynama Stadium (Minsk)	Football	50,125	
Kirov Stadium (Leningrad)	Football	74,000	
Republican Stadium (Kiev)	Football	100,169	

=== Outside of Moscow ===
Venue	Sports	Capacity	Ref.
Moscow-Minsk Highway	Cycling (road team time trial)	1,800	
Olympic Regatta in Tallinn	Sailing	Not listed	

== Before the Olympics ==
The oldest venue for the games was Republican Stadium in Kiev, which was constructed in 1923. Dynamo Central Stadium's Grand Arena in Moscow was constructed in 1928 for the first Spartakiad. Young Pioneers Stadium was constructed between 1932 and 1934. For the 1956 Spartakiad, four venues were constructed, most notably Central Lenin Stadium Grand Arena (now Luzhniki Stadium) in 1956. The Canoeing and Rowing Basin was constructed in 1973 for the European Rowing Championships. Moscow first bid for the Olympic Games in 1970 for the 1976 Summer Olympics, losing out to Montreal, Quebec. Four years later, it beat out Los Angeles for the 1980 Summer Games. One of the new venues constructed was the cycling circuit at the Krylatskoye Sports Circuit that was the first permanent venue for road cycling. Plans to build some of the venues used for the 1980 Games were in place in 1971 with expected completion to be in 1990, a year before the fall of the Soviet Union. These were done in six different venues and the new venues were completed by 1979.

== During the Olympics ==
The men's individual road race cycling event featured the largest margin of victory in the event since 1928 when gold medalist Sergei Sukhoruchenkov of the Soviet Union pulled away from the pack with 20 mi (32 km) remaining though that event was an individual time trial event. At the Olimpiysky Sports Complex Swimming Pool during the men's springboard diving final, the noise of the men's 100 m butterfly which was going on at the same time, created issues during one Soviet diver Aleksandr Portnov's dives. Portnov turned a two-and-a-half backward somersault into a belly flop. He protested immediately, was awarded as redive which he did perfectly and won gold. Similar protests from divers representing East Germany, Italy, and Mexico followed, but they were disallowed. This resulted in protests outside of the Soviet Embassy in Mexico City because of the decision. Luzhniki hosted the football final that was held for the third straight Olympics in a rainstorm. In that final, Czechoslovakia defeated East Germany 1–0 in a game that had four cautions and two expulsions.

== After the Olympics ==
Moscow hosted the World Artistic Gymnastics Championships in 1981. The city also hosted the World Amateur Boxing Championships eight years later.

Following the 1991 dissolution of the Soviet Union, the erstwhile Olympic venues were divided between four of the new states. The regatta in Tallinn was now in Estonia, Dynama Stadium in Minsk was now in Belarus, and the Kiev Republican Stadium is called Olimpiyskiy National Sports Complex in Ukraine.

Luzhniki Stadium, then as Grand Lenin Stadium, had a human crush disaster on 20 October 1982 during a second round UEFA Cup football match between FC Spartak Moscow and HFC Haarlem of the Netherlands. The disaster has since become known as the Luzhniki disaster. Luzhniki served as host for the World Championships in Athletics in 2013. In December 2010, Russia was awarded the 2018 FIFA World Cup with Luzhniki and Dynamo Grand Stadium being proposed as venues for the Cup.

The Moscow Canoeing and Rowing Basin served as host for the ICF Canoe Sprint World Championships 2014.
