= List of Summer Olympics venues: J–K =

For the Summer Olympics, there were 11 venues that started with the letter 'J' and 22 venues that started with the letter 'K'.

== J ==
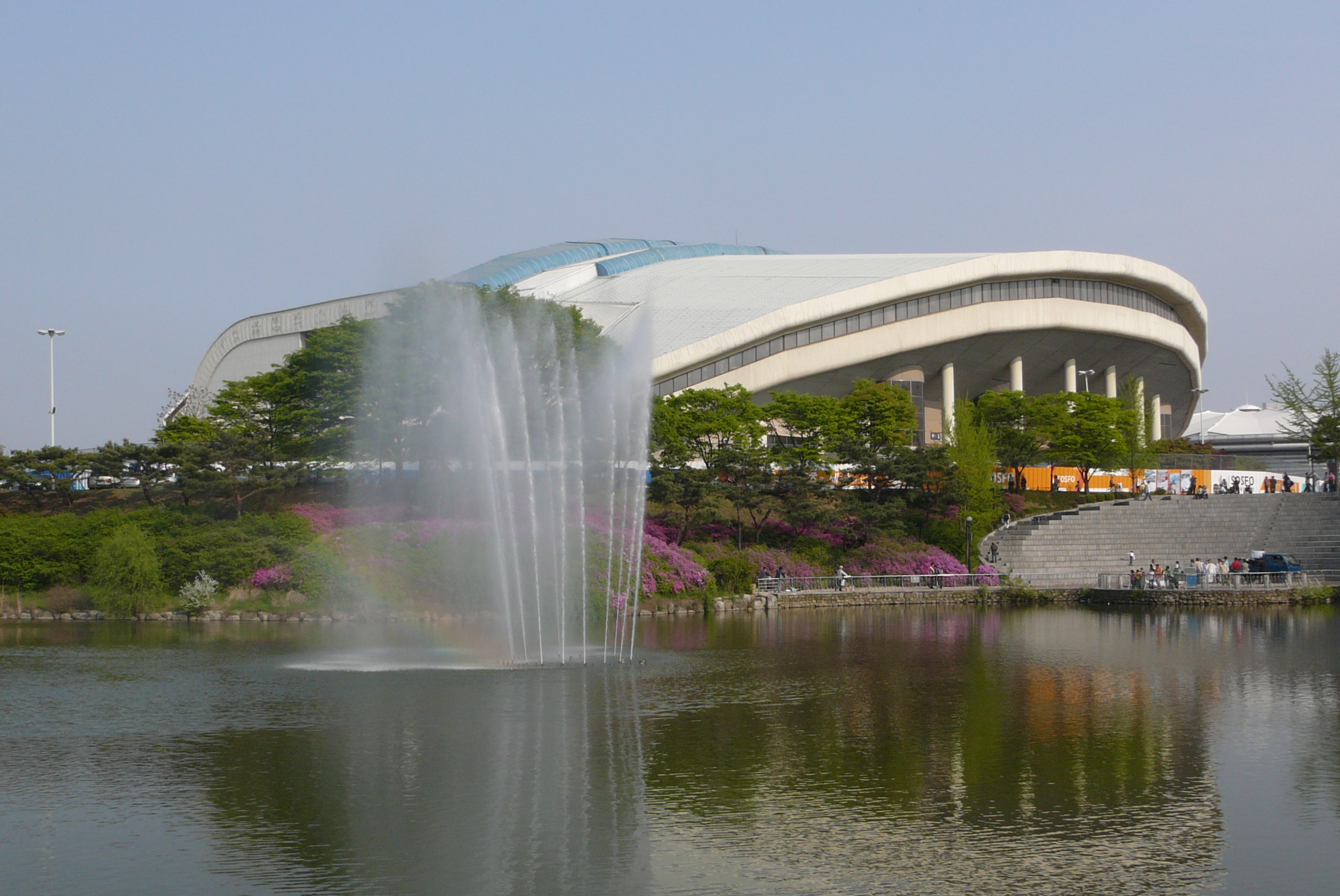
The Jamsil Swimming Pool hosted the diving, swimming part of the modern pentathlon, swimming, and water polo events for the 1988 Summer Olympics in Seoul.

Venue	Games	Sports	Capacity	Ref.
Jahnstadion	1972 Munich	Football	11,200	
Jalisco Stadium	1968 Mexico City	Football	56,713	
Jamsil Baseball Stadium	1988 Seoul	Baseball	30,306	
Jamsil Gymnasium	1988 Seoul	Basketball, Volleyball (final)	12,751	
Jamsil Indoor Swimming Pool	1988 Seoul	Diving, Modern pentathlon (swimming), Swimming, Synchronized swimming, Water polo	8,000	
Jamsil Students' Gymnasium	1988 Seoul	Boxing	7,500	
Jangchung Gymnasium	1988 Seoul	Judo, Taekwondo (demonstration)	7,000	
João Havelange Stadium	2016 Rio de Janeiro	Athletics, Football	60,000	
Juan de la Barrera Olympic Gymnasium	1968 Mexico City	Volleyball (final)	5,242	
Juan Escutia Sports Palace	1968 Mexico City	Basketball, Volleyball	22,370	
Jules Ottenstadion	1920 Antwerp	Football (Italy-Egypt)	Not listed.	

== K ==
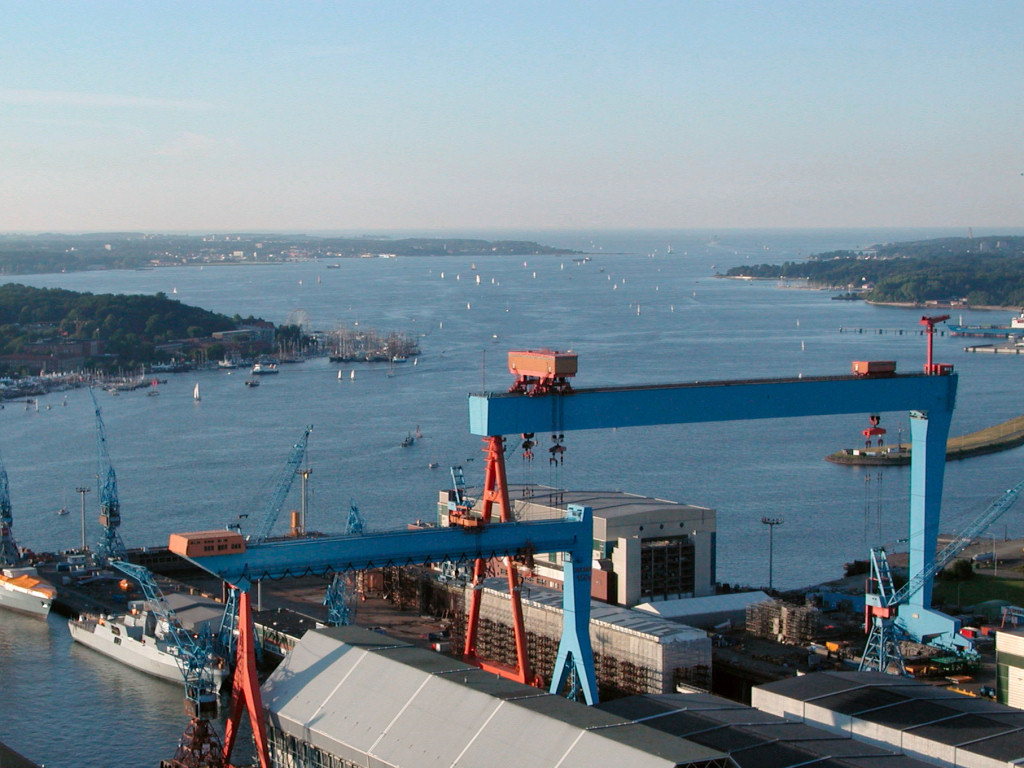
Kiel Fjord, Bay and shipyard crane. The bay itself served as host for the sailing competitions for both the 1936 Summer Olympics in Berlin and the 1972 Summer Olympics in Munich.

Venue	Games	Sports	Capacity	Ref.
Kaftanzoglio Stadium	2004 Athens	Football	37,000	
Kallithea	1896 Athens	Shooting	Not listed.	
Kaknäs	1912 Stockholm	Modern pentathlon (shooting)	Not listed.	
Käpylä	1952 Helsinki	Cycling (road)	25,700	
Karaiskakis Stadium	2004 Athens	Football	40,000	
Karasuyama-machi	1964 Tokyo	Athletics (marathon, 50 km walk)	Not listed.	
Karuizawa	1964 Tokyo	Equestrian	1,500	
Kemigawa	1964 Tokyo	Modern pentathlon (running)	1,500	
Kiel Bay	1936 Berlin	Sailing	Not listed.	
Kirov Stadium	1980 Moscow	Football	72,000	
Komazawa Gymnasium	1964 Tokyo	Wrestling	3,900	
Komazawa Hockey Field	1964 Tokyo	Field hockey	2,000 (1st field); 3,400 (2nd field); 2,300 (3rd field)	
Komazawa Stadium	1964 Tokyo	Football	20,800	
Komazawa Volleyball Courts	1964 Tokyo	Volleyball	3,900	
Korakuen Ice Palace	1964 Tokyo	Boxing	4,500	
Kotka	1952 Helsinki	Football	3,500	
Kotzia Square	2004 Athens	Cycling (individual road race)	3,150	
Krachtsportgebouw	1928 Amsterdam	Boxing, Weightlifting, Wrestling	2,840	
Krylatskoye Sports Complex Archery Field	1980 Moscow	Archery	3,000	
Krylatskoye Sports Complex Canoeing and Rowing Basin	1980 Moscow	Canoeing, Rowing	21,600	
Krylatskoye Sports Complex Cycling Circuit	1980 Moscow		Cycling (individual road race)	4,000
Krylatskoye Sports Complex Velodrome	1980 Moscow	Cycling (track)	6,000	
