= List of Olympic venues in cycling =

For the Summer Olympics, there are 76 venues that have been or will be used for cycling.

Games	Venue	Other sports hosted at venue for those games	Capacity	Ref.
1896 Athens	Marathon (city) (individual road race)	Athletics (Marathon)	Not listed.	
1896 Athens	Neo Phaliron Velodrome (track)	None	Not listed.	
1900 Paris	Vélodrome de Vincennes	Cricket, Football, Gymnastics, and Rugby union	Not listed.	
1904 St. Louis	Francis Field	Archery, Athletics, Football, Gymnastics, Lacrosse, Roque, Tennis, Tug of war, Weightlifting, and Wrestling	19,000.	
1908 London	White City Stadium (track)	Archery, Athletics, Diving, Field hockey, Football, Gymnastics, Lacrosse, Rugby union, Swimming, Tug of war, Water polo (final), Wrestling	97,000.	
1912 Stockholm	Liljeholmen	Equestrian	Not listed.	
1912 Stockholm	Mälaren	None	Not listed.	
1920 Antwerp	Antwerp (road)	None	Not listed.	
1920 Antwerp	Vélodrome d'Anvers Zuremborg (track)	None	Not listed.	
1924 Paris	Stade de Colombes (road)	Athletics, Equestrian, Fencing, Football (final), Gymnastics, Modern pentathlon (fencing, running), Rugby union, Tennis	22,737	
1924 Paris	Vélodrome d'hiver (track)	Boxing, Fencing, Weightlifting, Wrestling	10,884	
1928 Amsterdam	Amsterdam (road)	None	Not listed.	
1928 Amsterdam	Olympic Stadium (track)	Athletics, Equestrian (jumping), Football (final), Gymnastics	31,600	
1932 Los Angeles	Los Angeles Avenue (road)	None	Not listed.	
1932 Los Angeles	Pacific Coast Highway (road)	None	Not listed.	
1932 Los Angeles	Rose Bowl in Pasadena (track)	None	85,000	
1932 Los Angeles	Vineyard Avenue (road)	None	Not listed.	
1936 Berlin	Avus Motor Road (road)	Athletics (marathon, 50 km walk)	Not listed.	
1936 Berlin	BSV 92 Field & Stadium (track)	Handball	1,000	
1948 London	Herne Hill Velodrome (track)	None	Not listed.	
1948 London	Windsor Great Park (road)	None	Not listed.	
1952 Helsinki	Käpylä (road)	None	25,700	
1952 Helsinki	Maunula (road)	None	21,708	
1952 Helsinki	Pakila (road)		Not listed.	
1952 Helsinki	Velodrome (track)	Field hockey	6,000	
1956 Melbourne	Broadmeadows (road)	None	Not listed.	
1956 Melbourne	Velodrome (track)	None	7,900	
1960 Rome	Olympic Velodrome (track)	Field hockey	20,000	
1960 Rome	Via Cassia (individual road race)	None	Not listed.	
1960 Rome	Via Flaminia (individual road race)	None	Not listed.	
1960 Rome	Via Cristoforo Colombo (road team time trial)	Athletics (marathon)	Not listed.	
1960 Rome	Via di Grottarossa (individual road race)	None	Not listed.	
1964 Tokyo	Hachioji City (road)	None	3,000	
1964 Tokyo	Hachioji Velodrome (track)	None	4,100	
1968 Mexico City	Agustín Melgar Olympic Velodrome (track)	None	3,000	
1968 Mexico City	Satellite Circuit (road)	None	Not listed	
1972 Munich	Bundesautobahn 96 (road team time trial)	None	Not listed.	
1972 Munich	Grünwald (individual road race)	None	Not listed.	
1972 Munich	Radstadion (track)	None	4,157	
1976 Montreal	Mount Royal Park (individual road race)	None	4,400	
1976 Montreal	Olympic Velodrome (track)	Judo	2,600	
1976 Montreal	Quebec Autoroute 40 (road team time trial)	None	Not listed.	
1980 Moscow	Krylatskoye Sports Complex Cycling Circuit (individual road race)	None	4,000	
1980 Moscow	Krylatskoye Sports Complex Velodrome (track)	None	6,000	
1980 Moscow	Moscow-Minsk Highway (road team time trial)	None	1,800	
1984 Los Angeles	Artesia Freeway (road team time trial)	None	Not listed.	
1984 Los Angeles	Olympic Velodrome (track)	None	8,400	
1984 Los Angeles	Streets of Mission Viejo (individual road race)	None	Not listed.	
1988 Seoul	Olympic Velodrome (track)	None	6,000	
1988 Seoul	Tongillo Road Course (road)	None	800	
1992 Barcelona	A-17 highway (road team time trial)	None	105,000	
1992 Barcelona	Circuit de Catalunya (road team time trial)	None	2,000	
1992 Barcelona	Sant Sadurní Cycling Circuit (individual road race)	None	45,000	
1992 Barcelona	Velòdrom d'Horta (track)	None	3,800	
1996 Atlanta	Cycling road course	None	800	
1996 Atlanta	Georgia International Horse Park (mountain biking)	Equestrian, Modern pentathlon (riding, running)	32,000	
1996 Atlanta	Stone Mountain Park Archery Center and Velodrome (track)	Archery	5,200 (archery); 6,000 (cycling track)	
2000 Sydney	Centennial Parklands (road)	None	Not listed.	
2000 Sydney	Dunc Gray Velodrome (track)	None	3,150	
2000 Sydney	Western Sydney Regional Park (mountain biking)	None	20,000	
2004 Athens	Athens Olympic Velodrome (track)	None	3,300	
2004 Athens	Kotzia Square (individual road race)	None	3,150	
2004 Athens	Parnitha Olympic Mountain Bike Venue (mountain biking)	None	Not listed.	
2004 Athens	Vouliagmeni Olympic Centre (individual time trial)	Triathlon	Not listed.	
2008 Beijing	Laoshan Bicycle Moto Cross (BMX) Venue	None	4,000	
2008 Beijing	Laoshan Mountain Bike Course (mountain biking)	None	2,000	
2008 Beijing	Laoshan Velodrome (track)	None	6,000	
2008 Beijing	Urban Road Cycling Course	None	Not listed.	
2012 London	BMX Circuit (BMX)	None	6,000 (temporary)	
2012 London	Hadleigh Farm (mountain biking)	None	20,000 (includes 3,000 seating)	
2012 London	London Velodrome (track)	None	6,000	
2012 London	Regent's Park (road)	None	Not listed.	
2016 Rio de Janeiro	Rio Olympic Velodrome (track)	None	5,800	
2016 Rio de Janeiro	Fort Copacabana (road)	Swimming (marathon), Triathlon		
2016 Rio de Janeiro	Pontal (road time trial)	Athletics (walks)		
2016 Rio de Janeiro	Olympic BMX Centre	None	7,500	
2016 Rio de Janeiro	Olympic Mountain Bike Park	None	25,000 (5,000 seats)	
2020 Tokyo	Izu Velodrome (track)	None	5,000	
2020 Tokyo	Ariake Urban Sports Park (BMX)	Skateboarding	6,600, 5,000	
2020 Tokyo	Musashinonomori Park (road races start)	None	Not listed.	
2020 Tokyo	Fuji Speedway (road races finish, road time trial)	None	22,000	
2020 Tokyo	Izu Mountain Bike Course	None	11,500	
2024 Paris	Vélodrome de Saint-Quentin-en-Yvelines (track, BMX Racing)	None	5,000, 5,000	
2024 Paris	Place de la Concorde (BMX freestyle)	3x3 Basketball, Breaking, Skateboarding	Not listed.	
2024 Paris	Pont Alexandre III (road time trial finish)	Swimming (marathon swimming), Triathlon	1,000	
2024 Paris	Pont d'Iéna (road)	Athletics (race walk)	13,000 (3,000 sitting)	
2024 Paris	Les Invalides (road time trial start)	Archery, Athletics (marathon finish)	8,000	
2024 Paris	Élancourt (mountain biking)	None	25,000	
2028 Los Angeles	VELO Sports Center (track)	None	6,000	
2028 Los Angeles	Venice Beach (road)	Triathlon, Marathon (marathon start)	5,000	
2028 Los Angeles	Valley Sports Park (BMX freestyle)	Archery, Skateboarding	6,000	
2028 Los Angeles	Frank G. Bonelli Regional Park (mountain biking)	None	3,000	
2032 Brisbane	Anna Meares Velodrome (track, BMX Racing)	None	5,000	
2032 Brisbane	Victoria Park (BMX freestyle)	Equestrian (cross-country)	25,000	
2032 Brisbane	Alexandra Headland (road)	Athletics (marathon start, race walk), Sailing (kiteboard)	5,000	
2032 Brisbane	Sunshine Coast Mountain Bike Centre	None	10,000	

== Gallery of venues ==
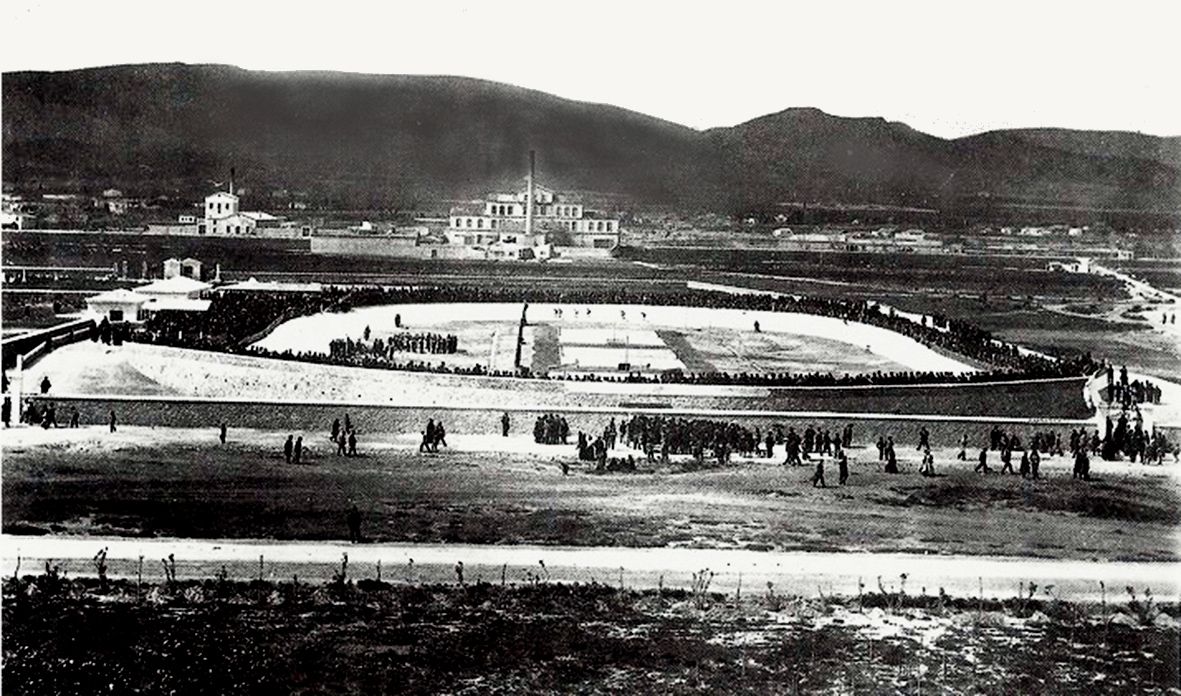
The Neo Phaliron Velodrome hosted track cycling at the 1896 Summer Olympics in Athens.

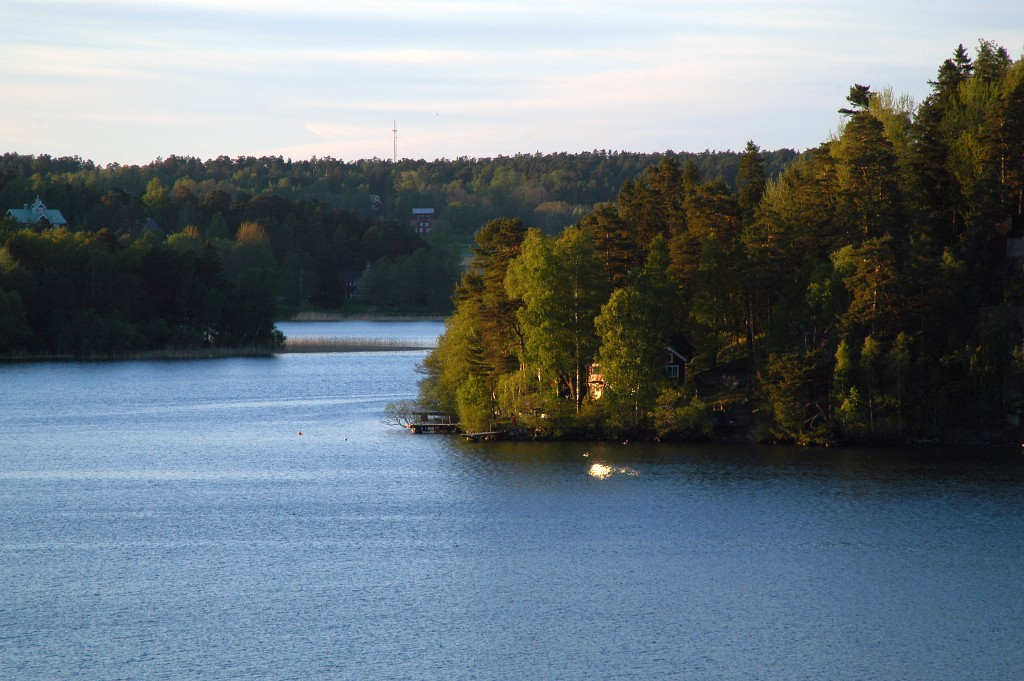
The lake around Mälaren hosted the road race at the 1912 Summer Olympics in Stockholm.

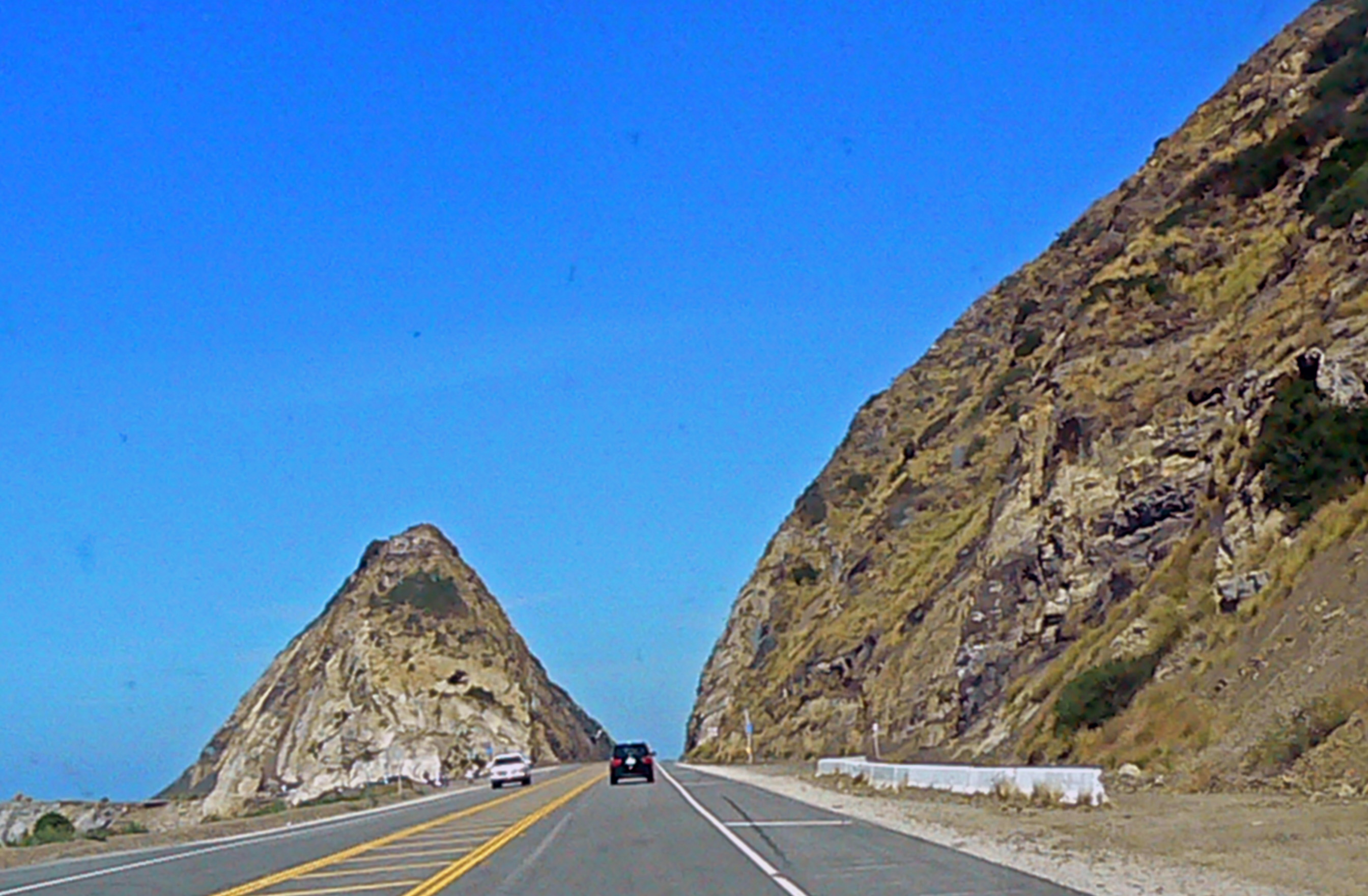
The Pacific Coast Highway hosted the road race at the 1932 Summer Olympics in Los Angeles.

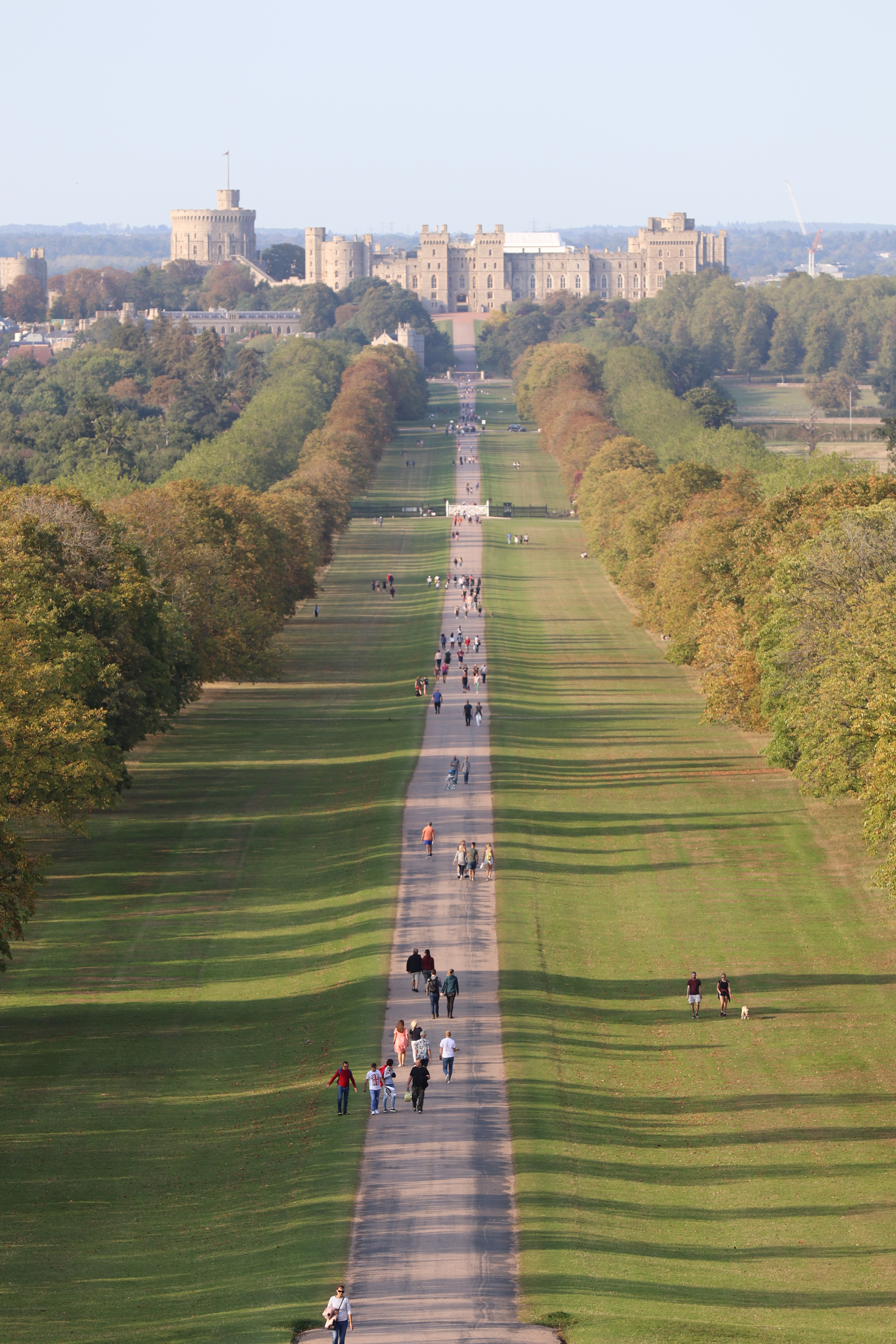
Windsor Great Park hosted the road race at the 1948 Summer Olympics in London.

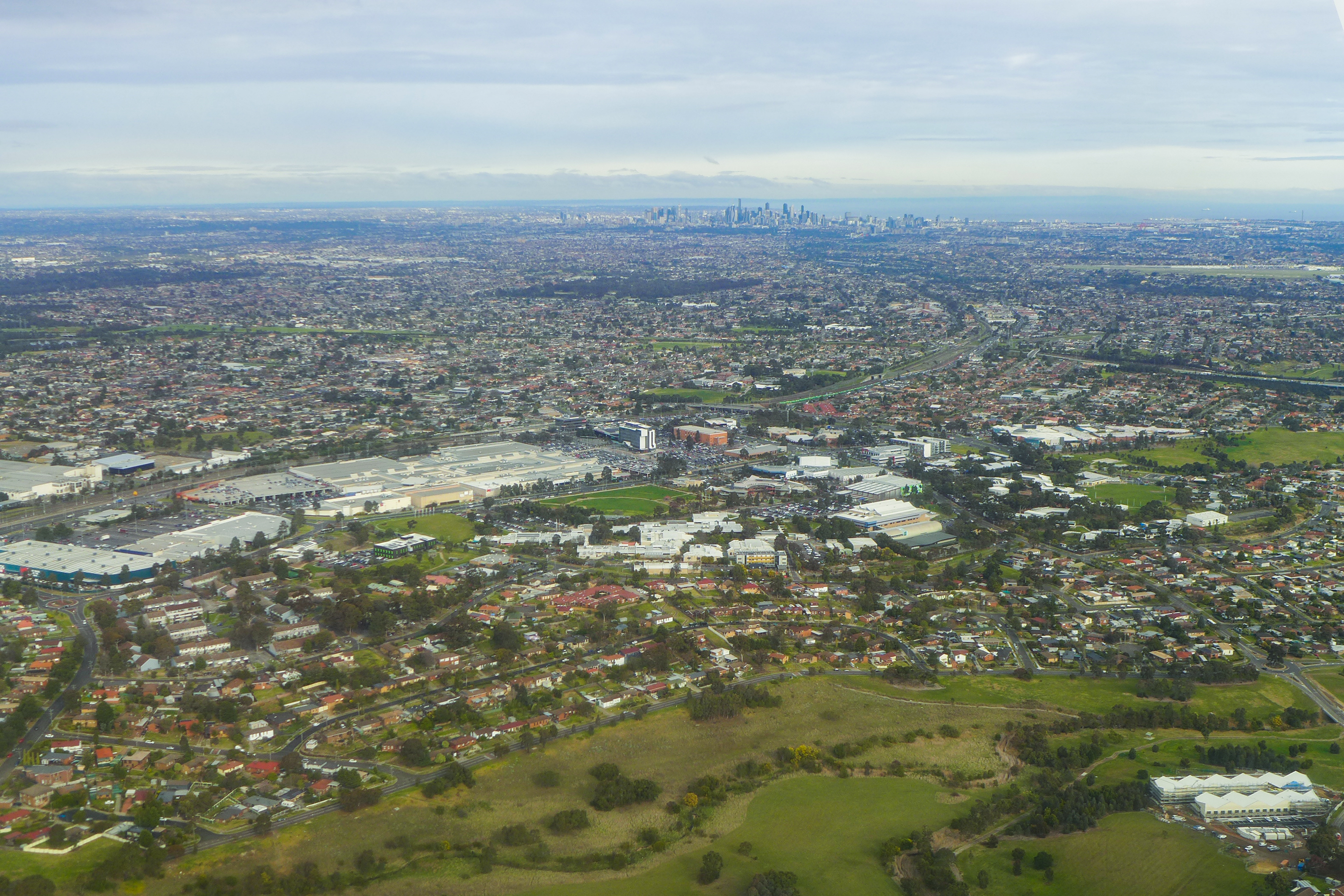
Broadmeadows hosted the road race at the 1956 Summer Olympics in Melbourne.

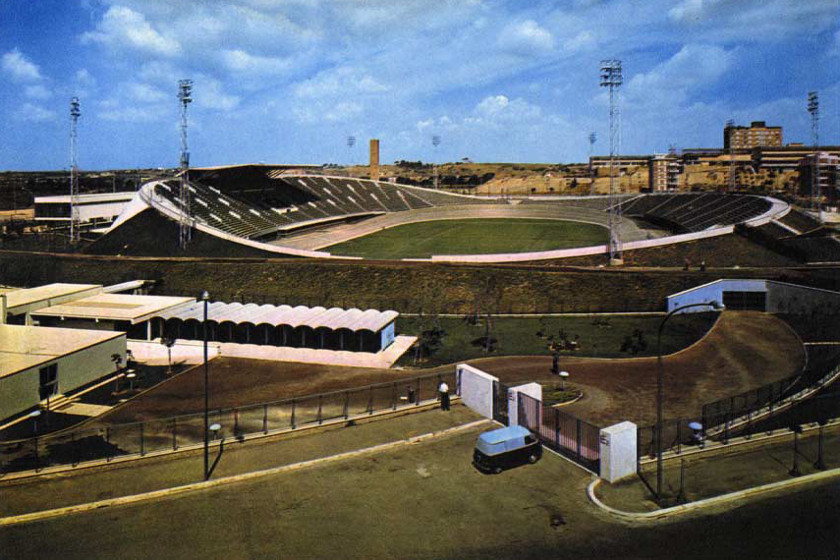
The Velodromo Olimpico hosted track cycling at the 1960 Summer Olympics in Rome.

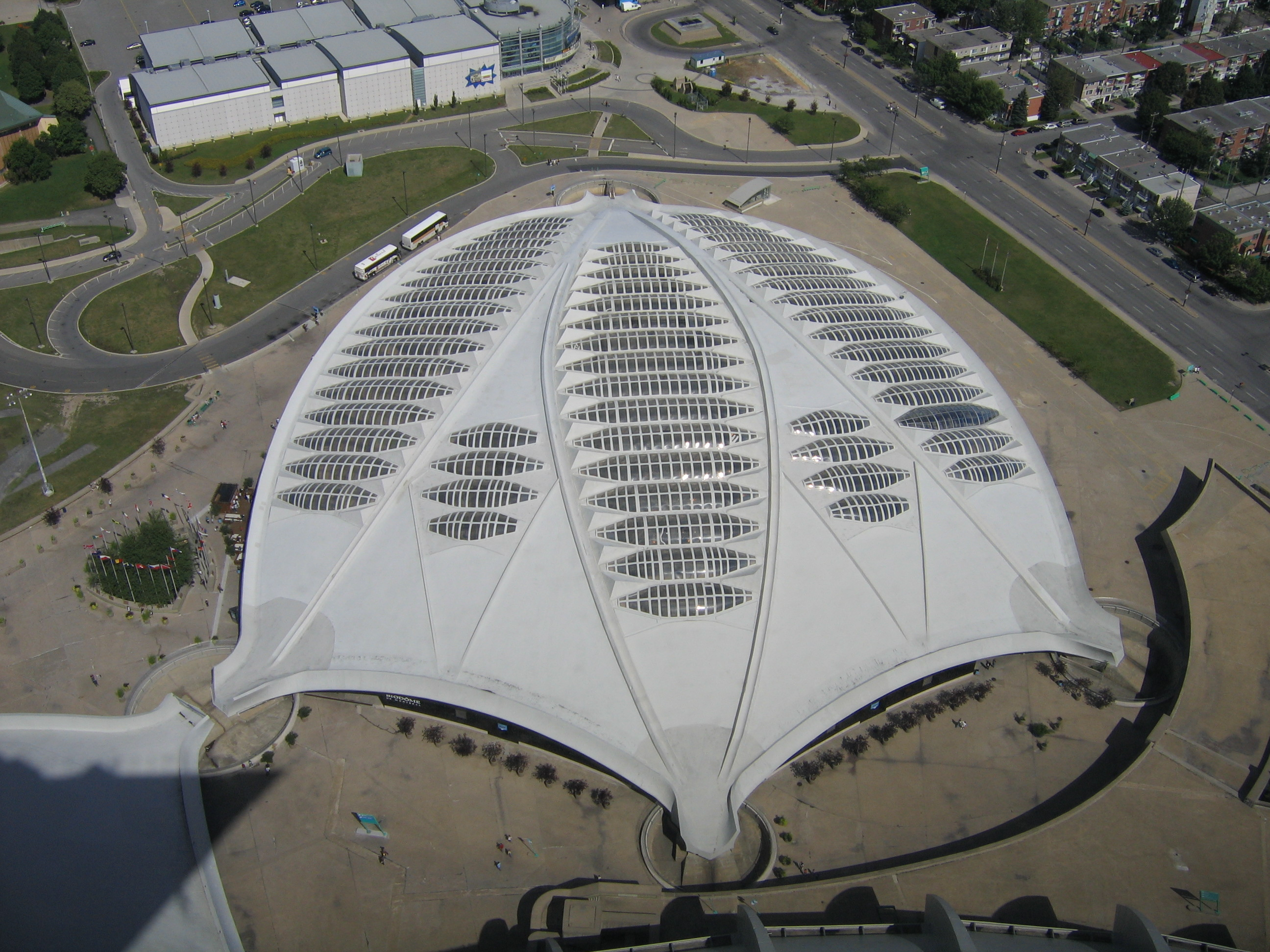
The Olympic Velodrome (now Montreal Biodome) hosted the track cycling competitions at the 1976 Summer Olympics in Montreal.

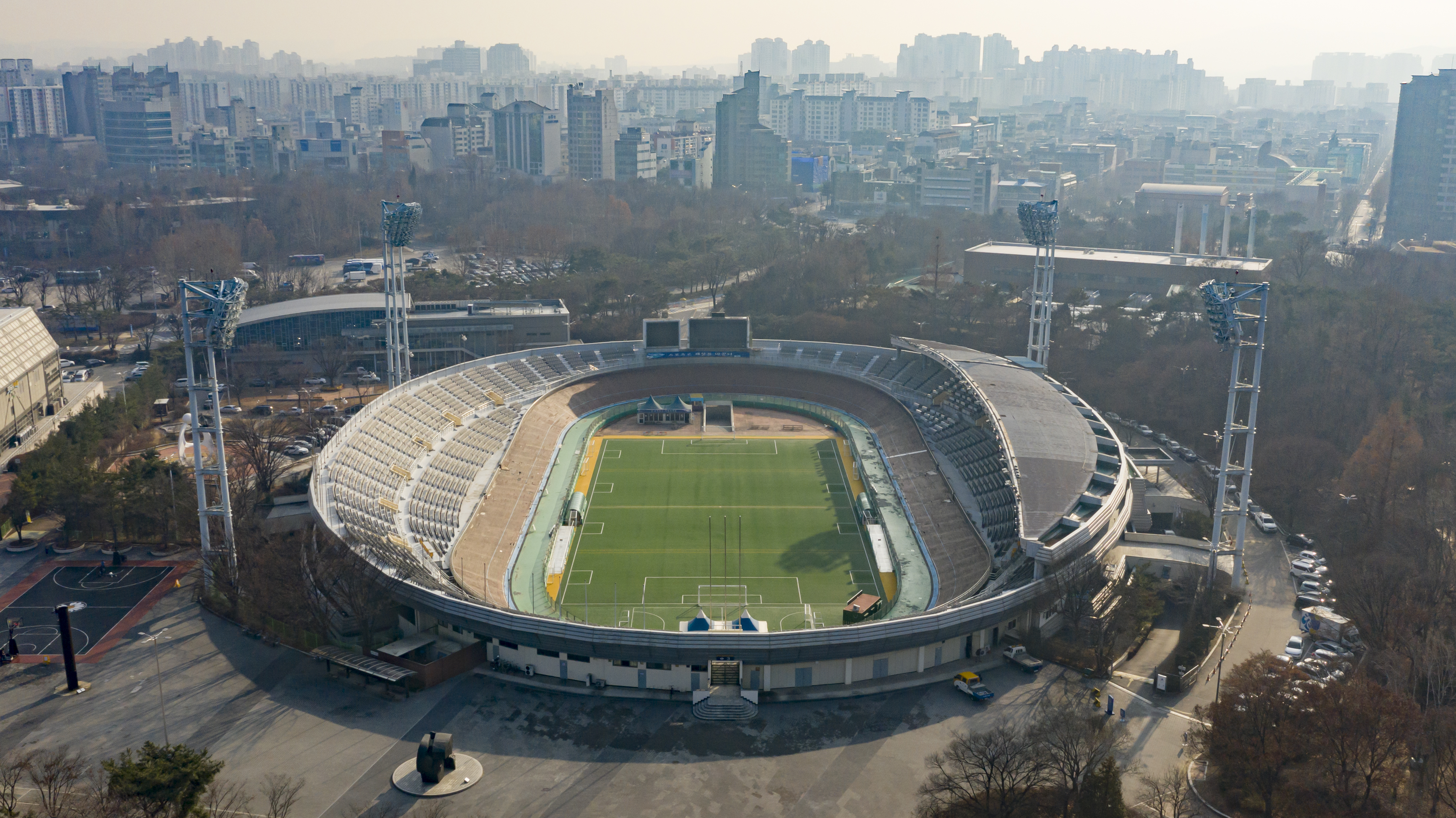
The Seoul Olympic Cyclodrome hosted track cycling at the 1988 Summer Olympics.

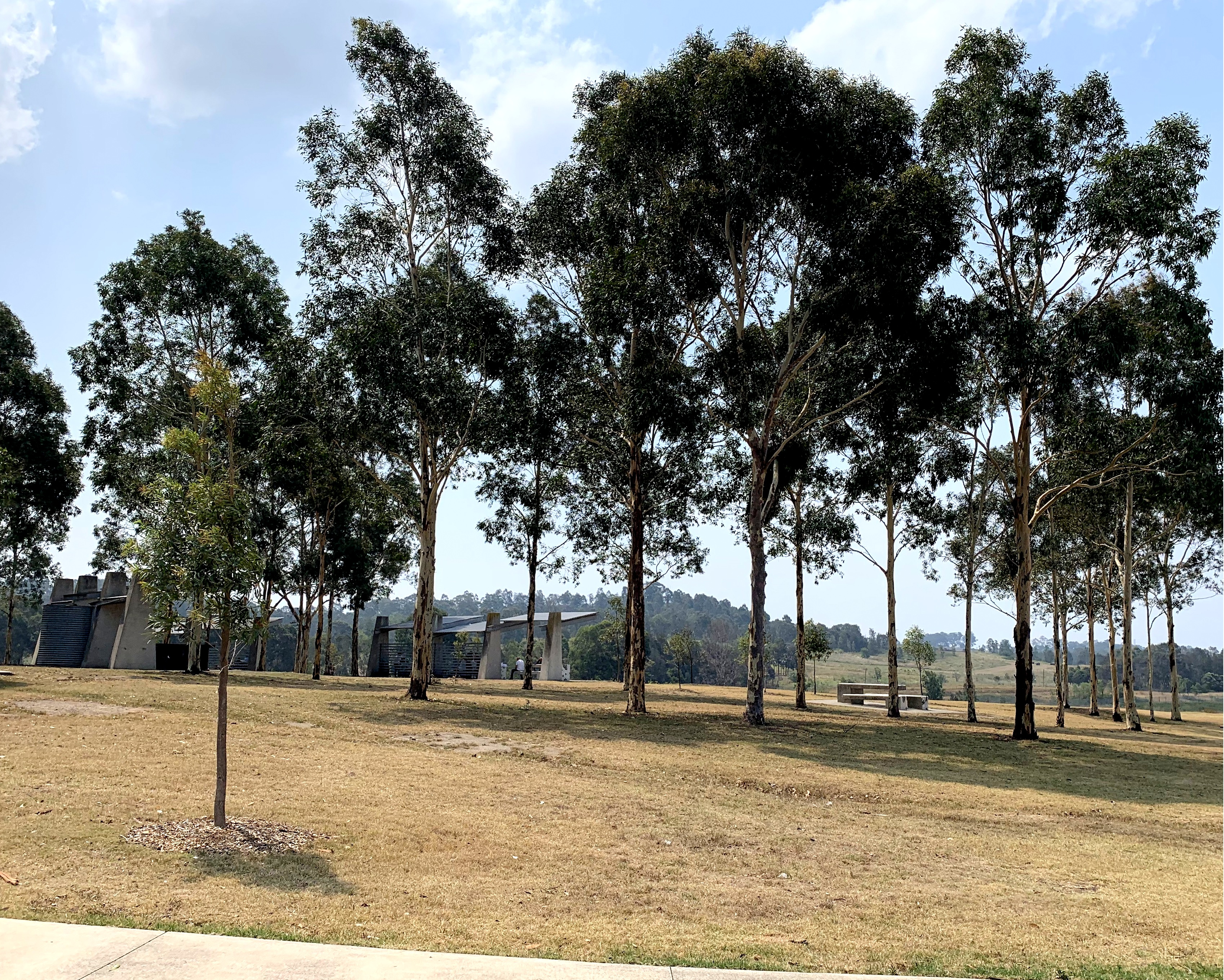
Western Sydney Regional Park hosted mountain biking at the 2000 Summer Olympics.

The Athens Olympic Velodrome hosted track cycling at the 2004 Summer Olympics.

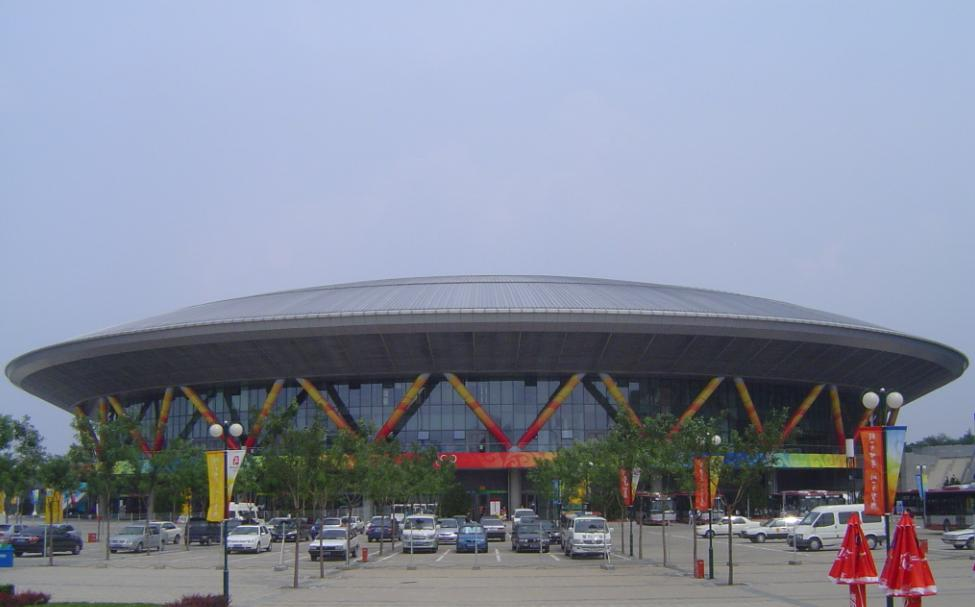
The Laoshan Velodrome hosted track cycling at the 2008 Summer Olympics in Beijing.

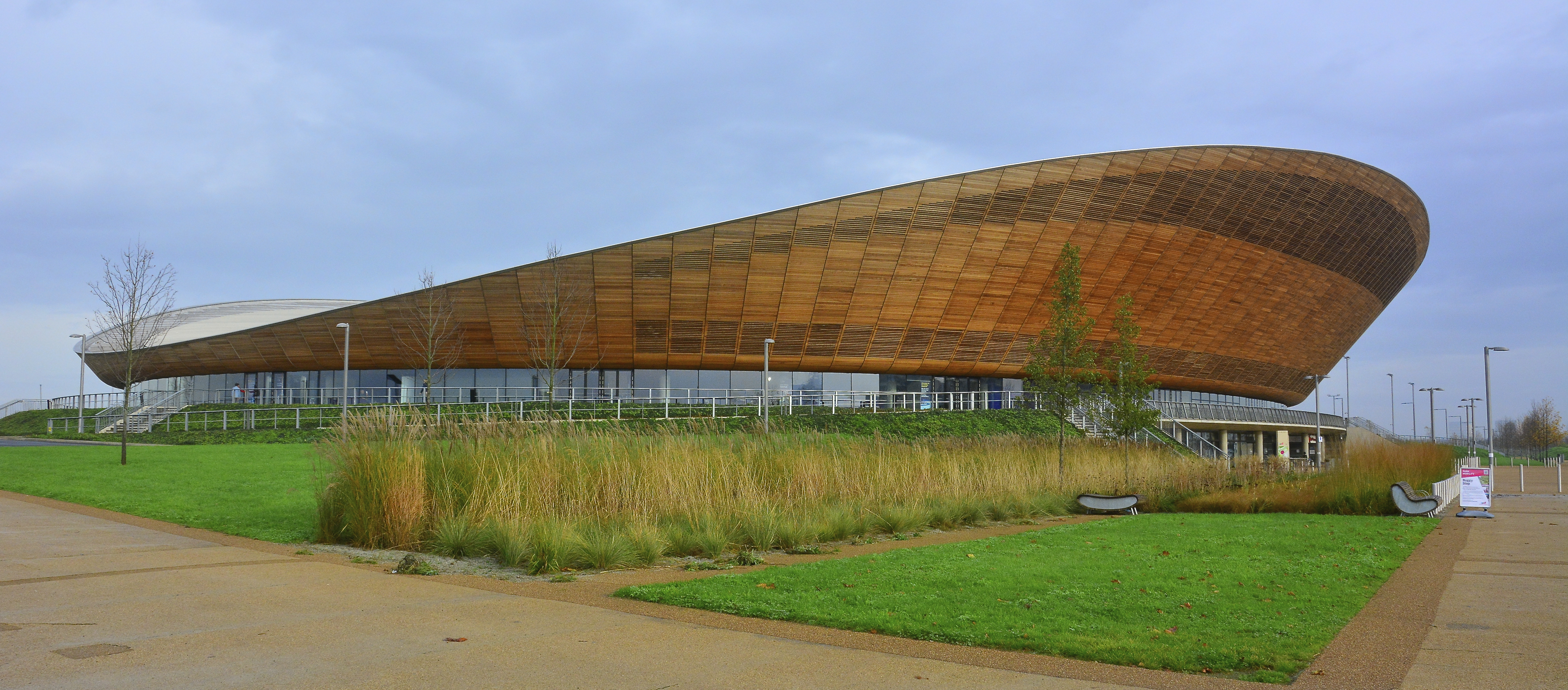
The Lee Valley VeloPark hosted track cycling at the 2012 Summer Olympics in London.

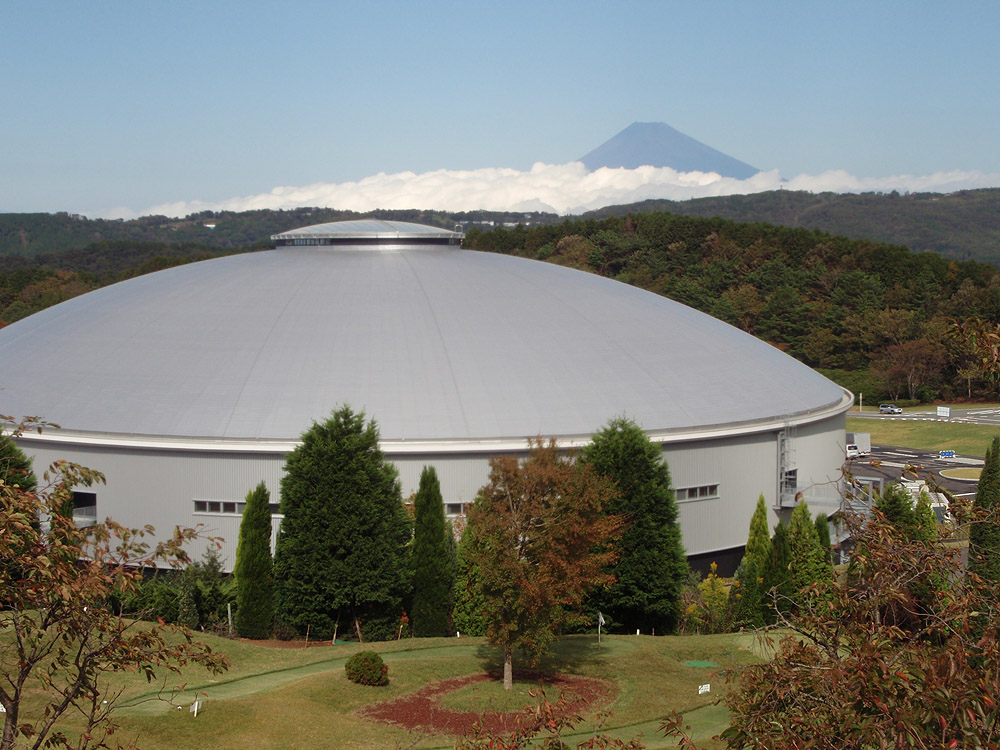
The Izu Velodrome hosted track cycling at the 2020 Summer Olympics in Tokyo.

The Vélodrome National hosted track cycling at the 2024 Summer Olympics in Paris.

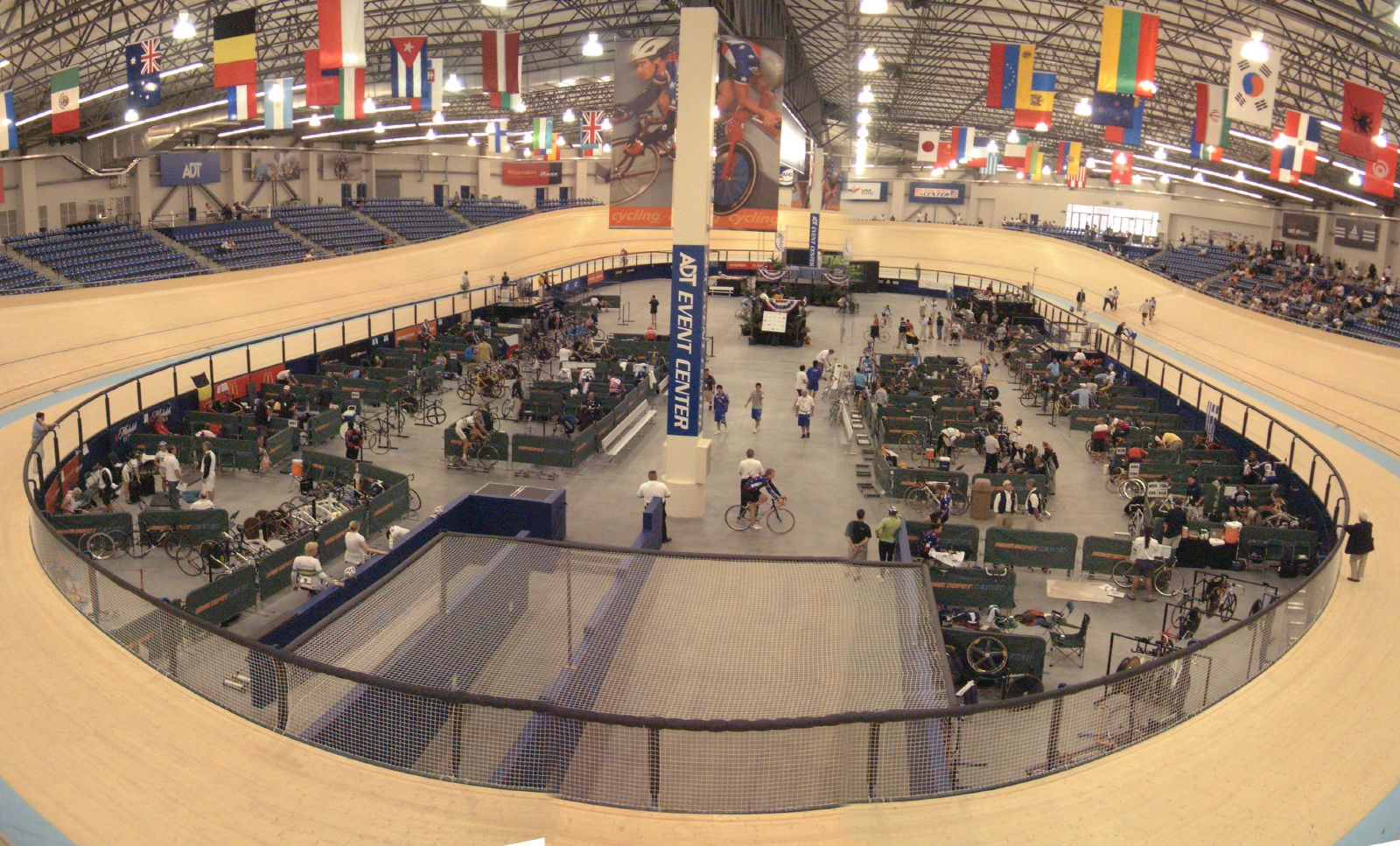
The Velo Sports Center will host track cycling at the 2028 Summer Olympics in Los Angeles. It replaced the previous track which hosted track cycling at the 1984 Summer Olympics.
