= Movchan =

Movchan (Ukrainian: Мовчан) is a surname of Ukrainian-language origin.

- Iryna Movchan (born 1990), Ukrainian figure skater
- Julian Movchan (1913–2002), Ukrainian-American writer
- Oleksiy Movchan (born 1994), Ukrainian politician
- Olena Movchan (born 1976), Ukrainian trampoline gymnast
- Pavlo Movchan (born 1939), Ukrainian poet
- Valery Movchan (born 1959), Soviet cyclist

== See also ==
- Molchan, alternative spelling
