= Jiri Pokorny =

Jiri Pokorny may refer to:

- Jiří Pokorný (cyclist) (born 1956), Olympic cyclist
- Jiří Pokorný (figure skater) (born 1953), Olympic figure skater
