= Cycling at the 1980 Summer Olympics – Men's team pursuit =

Cycling – Men's team pursuit at the Games of the XXII Olympiad
- Venue: Moscow Olympic Velodrome
- Dates: 25–26 July
- Competitors: 53 from 13 nations

Medalists
1st place, gold medalist(s)		Viktor Manakov; Valery Movchan; Vladimir Osokin; Vitaly Petrakov; Aleksandr Krasnov	Soviet Union
2nd place, silver medalist(s)		Gerald Mortag; Uwe Unterwalder; Matthias Wiegand; Volker Winkler	East Germany
3rd place, bronze medalist(s)		Teodor Černý; Martin Penc; Jiří Pokorný; Igor Sláma	Czechoslovakia

The men's team pursuit event at the 1980 Summer Olympics took place on 25 and 26 July 1980 in Moscow Olympic Velodrome.

== Results ==
=== Qualifying ===
Rank	Cyclists	Land	Time	Speed (km/h)	Qualified
1	Aleksandr Krasnov; Viktor Manakov; Valery Movchan; Vitaly Petrakov	Soviet Union	4:16.62	56.1147	Q
2	Gerald Mortag; Uwe Unterwalder; Matthias Wiegand; Volker Winkler	East Germany	4:18.24	55.7627	Q
3	Pierangelo Bincoletto; Guido Bontempi; Ivano Maffei; Silvestro Milani	Italy	4:18.85	55.6317	Q
4	Teodor Černý; Martin Penc; Jiří Pokorný; Igor Sláma	Czechoslovakia	4:19.56	55.4787	Q
5	Sean Yates; Tony Doyle; Malcolm Elliott; Glen Mitchell	Great Britain	4:19.73	55.4227	Q
6	Alain Bondue; Philippe Chevalier; Pascal Poisson; Jean-Marc Rebière	France	4:20.52	55.2747	Q
7	Robert Dill-Bundi; Urs Freuler; Hans Känel; Hans Ledermann	Switzerland	4:20.56	55.2667	Q
8	Colin Fitzgerald; Kevin Nichols; Gary Sutton; Kelvin Poole	Australia	4:21.76	55.0127	Q
9	Marek Kulesza; Andrzej Michalak; Janusz Sałach; Zbigniew Woźnicki	Poland	4:28.38	53.6557	
10	Jan Blomme; Diederik Foubert; Jozef Simons; Joseph Smeets	Belgium	4:29.75	53.383	
11	Hans Fischer; José Carlos de Lima; Fernando Louro; Antônio Silvestre	Brazil	4:32.34	52.875	
12	Ervin Dér; Csaba Pálinkás; Zsigmond Sarkadi Nagy; Gábor Szűcs	Hungary	4:36.32	52.113	
13	Esteban Espinosa; Jhon Jarrín; Edwin Mena; Juan Palacios	Ecuador	4:50.83	49.513	

=== Quarter finals ===
Heat 1

Rank	Nation	Time	Speed (km/h)	Qualified
1	Czechoslovakia	4:18.48	55.710	Q
2	Great Britain	4:23.45	54.659	

Heat 2

Rank	Nation	Time	Speed (km/h)	Qualified
1	Italy	4:18.27	55.756	Q
2	France	4:18.58	55.689	

Heat 3

Rank	Nation	Time	Speed (km/h)	Qualified
1	East Germany	4:17.43	55.937	Q
2	Switzerland	4:23.56	54.636	

Heat 4

Rank	Nation	Time	Speed (km/h)	Qualified
1	Soviet Union	4:14.64	56.550	Q
2	Australia	4:22.02	54.958	

=== Semi finals ===
Heat 1

Rank	Nation	Time	Speed (km/h)	Qualified
1	East Germany	4:18.16	55.779	Q
2	Italy	4:20.13	55.357	

Heat 2

Rank	Nation	Time	Speed (km/h)	Qualified
1	Soviet Union	4:26.52	54.030	Q
2	Czechoslovakia	4:32.68	52.809	

=== Finals ===
Bronze medal race

Rank	Nation	Time	Speed (km/h)	Place
1	Czechoslovakia	4:10.01		3rd place, bronze medalist(s)
2	Italy	4:11.63	REL	4

Gold medal race

Rank	Nation	Time	Speed (km/h)	Place
1	Soviet Union	4:15.70	56.316	1st place, gold medalist(s)
2	East Germany	4:19.67	55.453	2nd place, silver medalist(s)
