= 1978 World Juniors Track Cycling Championships =

- Venue: Washington, D.C., United States
- Date: August 1978

The 1978 World Juniors Track Cycling Championships were the fourth annual Junior World Championships for track cycling held in Washington, D.C., United States in August 1978. It was the first championship to be held outside Europe.

The Championships had five events for men only, Sprint, Points race, Individual pursuit, Team pursuit and 1 kilometre time trial.

== Events ==
| Event | Gold | Silver | Bronze |
|---|---|---|---|
Men's Events
| Sprint | Sergei Kopylov; Soviet Union | Mich Hotzan; East Germany | Frank Micke; East Germany |
| Points race | Kenny De Maerteleire; Belgium | Allan Peiper; Australia | Michael Marx; West Germany |
| Individual pursuit | Alex Grosser; East Germany | Viktor Manakov; Soviet Union | Thomas Schnelle; East Germany |
| Team pursuit | Alexandre Krasnov; Nikolai Manakov; Viktor Manakov; Ivan Mitchenko; Soviet Union | Frank Enger; Markus Intra; Michael Maue; Peter Stalla; West Germany | Bernd Dittert; Michael Koller; Axel Grosser; Thomas Schnelle; East Germany |
| Time trial | Frank Micke; East Germany | Sergei Kopylov; Soviet Union | Heinz Isler; Switzerland |

== Medal table ==
* Host nation (United States)

| Rank | Nation | Gold | Silver | Bronze | Total |
|---|---|---|---|---|---|
| 1 | Soviet Union (URS) | 2 | 2 | 0 | 4 |
| 2 | East Germany (GDR) | 2 | 1 | 3 | 6 |
| 3 | Belgium (BEL) | 1 | 0 | 0 | 1 |
| 4 | West Germany (FRG) | 0 | 1 | 1 | 2 |
| 5 | Australia (AUS) | 0 | 1 | 0 | 1 |
| 6 | Switzerland (SUI) | 0 | 0 | 1 | 1 |
| Totals (6 entries) | | 5 | 5 | 5 | 15 |
