= Cycling at the 1980 Summer Olympics – Men's track time trial =

Men's track event at the 1980 summer Olympics

Men's track time trial at the Games of the XXII Olympiad
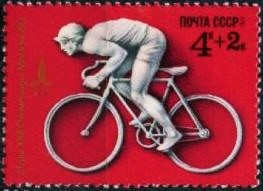
- Soviet stamp commemorating 1980 Olympic cycling
- Venue: Krylatskoye Sports Complex Velodrome
- Dates: 22 July
- Competitors: 18 from 18 nations
- Winning time: 1:02.955 WR

Medalists
1st place, gold medalist(s)		Lothar Thoms; East Germany
2nd place, silver medalist(s)		Aleksandr Panfilov; Soviet Union
3rd place, bronze medalist(s)		David Weller; Jamaica

The men's track time trial event at the 1980 Summer Olympics took place on 22 July 1980 in Moscow Olympic Velodrome. There were 18 competitors from 18 nations, with one additional cyclist entered but not starting. The event was won by Lothar Thoms of East Germany, the nation's second consecutive victory in the men's track time trial (tying Australia, Italy, and Denmark for second-most all-time). Aleksandr Panfilov of the Soviet Union took silver, the nation's first medal in the event since 1960. David Weller's bronze remains—through the 2020 Games—Jamaica's only medal outside of track and field athletics (86 athletics medals, 1 cycling medal). Denmark's three-Games medal streak (entirely the work of Niels Fredborg) ended.

== Background ==
This was the 13th appearance of the event, which had previously been held in 1896 and every Games since 1928. It would be held every Games until being dropped from the programme after 2004. The only returning cyclist from 1976 was eleventh-place finisher David Weller of Jamaica. There were few medal contenders among the boycotting nations. The favorite was East German Lothar Thoms, the 1978 and 1979 world champion.

Ecuador, Libya, and Zimbabwe each made their debut in the men's track time trial. France and Great Britain each made their 13th appearance, having competed at every appearance of the event.

== Competition format ==
The event was a time trial on the track, with each cyclist competing separately to attempt to achieve the fastest time. Each cyclist raced one kilometre from a standing start.

== Records ==
The following were the world and Olympic records prior to the competition.

World record	Pierre Trentin (FRA)	1:03.91	Mexico City, Mexico	17 October 1968
Olympic record	Pierre Trentin (FRA)	1:03.91	Mexico City, Mexico	17 October 1968

Lothar Thoms broke the world record by nearly a full second, recording a time of 1:02.955. No other cyclist came close to the old record time.

== Schedule ==
All times are Moscow Time (UTC+3)

Date	Time	Round
Tuesday, 22 July 1980	19:00	Final

== Results ==
Rank	Cyclist	Nation	Time	Notes
1st place, gold medalist(s)	Lothar Thoms	East Germany	1:02.955	WR
2nd place, silver medalist(s)	Aleksandr Panfilov	Soviet Union	1:04.845	
3rd place, bronze medalist(s)	David Weller	Jamaica	1:05.241	
4	Guido Bontempi	Italy	1:05.478	
5	Yavé Cahard	France	1:05.584	
6	Heinz Isler	Switzerland	1:06.263	
7	Petr Kocek	Czechoslovakia	1:06.368	
8	Bjarne Sørensen	Denmark	1:07.422	
9	Terrence Tinsley	Great Britain	1:07.542	
10	Kenrick Tucker	Australia	1:07.709	
11	Andrzej Michalak	Poland	1:07.891	
12	Stoyan Petrov	Bulgaria	1:08.682	
13	Jan Blomme	Belgium	1:09.015	
14	Errol McLean	Guyana	1:09.991	
15	Hans Fischer	Brazil	1:10.801	
16	Esteban Espinosa	Ecuador	1:11.419	
17	Khalid Shebani	Libya	1:11.627	
18	John Musa	Zimbabwe	1:15.779	
—	Patrick Wackström	Finland	DNS	
