= Cycling at the 1983 Summer Universiade =

The Cycling Tournament at the 1983 Summer Universiade took place in Edmonton, Alberta (Canada) in July 1983. Cycling was included in the Summer Universiade programme as an optional sport. There were 12 cycling events—8 for track cycling and 4 for road cycling. The venue for track cycling was the Argyll Velodrome. The road race finals took place at Hawrelak Park.

== Events ==
=== Track time trials ===
In the afternoon competition on 4 July under the sun at the Argyll Velodrome, two cyclists from the Soviet Union won men's and women's 1-km time trial. Aleksandr Panfilov took the men's event in 1:06.874 seconds, 1.015 seconds ahead of the silver medalist, Stefano Baudino of Italy, and 1.1667 seconds faster than bronze medalist, Andris Zelch-Lotchmelis of the Soviet Union. In the women's time trial, Erika Salumäe of the Soviet Union captured the gold with a time of 1:14.554. Isabelle Nicoloso of France, who was 1.316 seconds slower, won the silver medal and Nadezhda Kibardina of the Soviet Union finished third.

=== Women's road race ===
The Soviet team was dominant throughout the race. On approach to the finish line, a breakaway group was formed, consisting of Nadezhda Kibardina and Tamara Poliakova from the Soviet Union, and Jeannie Longo from France. In the final sprint, Kibardina emerged victorious, followed by Poliakova and Longo.

== Medalists ==
=== Medal table ===
Rank	Nation	Gold	Silver	Bronze	Total
1	Soviet Union (URS)	10	6	5	21
2	France (FRA)	1	3	2	6
3	Italy (ITA)	1	1	1	3
4	Netherlands (NED)	0	1	0	1
4	Romania (ROM)	0	1	0	1
6	Canada (CAN)	0	0	1	1
6	China (CHN)	0	0	1	1
6	Cuba (CUB)	0	0	1	1
6	South Korea (KOR)	0	0	1	1
Totals (9 entries)		12	12	12	36

=== Road cycling ===
Event	Gold	Silver	Bronze
Men's road race	Sergio Scremin (ITA)	Pavel Muzhitskiy (URS)	Shin Dea Cheul (KOR)
Men's team time trial	(Soviet Union) Soviet Union; Yuriy Kashirin; Sergey Navolokin; Sergey Voronin; Yevgeniy Korolkov	(Netherlands) Netherlands; Henk Boeve; Maarten Ducrot; Willem Jennen; Tanke Kolkhuis	(Italy) Italy; Ennio Minello; Roberto Paoletti; Fabio Sciamanna; Sergio Scremin
Women's road race	Nadezhda Kibardina (URS)	Tamara Poliakova (URS)	Jeannie Longo (FRA)
Women's time trial	Tamara Poliakova (URS)	L. Slepokurova (URS)	Nadezhda Kibardina (URS)

=== Track cycling ===
Event	Gold	Silver	Bronze
Men's sprint	Aleksey Dotsenko (URS)	Yemzar Guelachvili (URS)	Almenares Triana (CUB)
Men's 1 km time trial	Aleksandr Panfilov (URS); 1:06.874	Stefano Baudino (ITA) + 1.015	Andris Zelch-Lotchmelis (URS) + 1.1667
Men's individual pursuit	Aleksandr Krasnov (URS)	Viktor Manakov (URS)	Alex Stieda (CAN)
Men's points race	Viktor Manakov (URS)	Gheorghe Lautara (ROM)	Robert Spezzatti (FRA)
Women's sprint	Erika Salumäe (URS)	Isabelle Nicoloso (FRA)	Yang Guiling (CHN)
Women's 1 km time trial	Erika Salumäe (URS); 1:14.554	Isabelle Nicoloso (FRA) + 1.316	Nadezhda Kibardina (URS)
Women's individual pursuit	Nadezhda Kibardina (URS)	Jeannie Longo (FRA)	Tamara Polyakova (URS)
Women's points race	Isabelle Nicoloso (FRA)	Erika Salumäe (URS)	Yekaterina Starikova (URS)
