= Edwin Mena =

Ecuadorian cyclist

Personal information
- Born: 23 August 1958 (age 68)

Cycling career
- Sport: Cycling

Edwin Mena (born 23 August 1958) is an Ecuadorian former cyclist. He competed in the team pursuit event at the 1980 Summer Olympics.
