= Zorokiv =

Village in Zhytomyr, Ukraine

Coordinates: 50°23′39″N 28°37′26″E

Zorokiv (Ukrainian: Зороків) is a village in the Zhytomyr Raion of Zhytomyr Oblast in west-central Ukraine, approximately 16 km. from the provincial capital of Zhytomir. One of the oldest settlements in the region, it is known for the St. Basil the Great Church which was built in 1772. The current population of Zorokiv is approximately 310. Zorokiv was the birthplace of Ukrainian writer and journalist Julian Movchan and ancestral home of his family.

== History ==
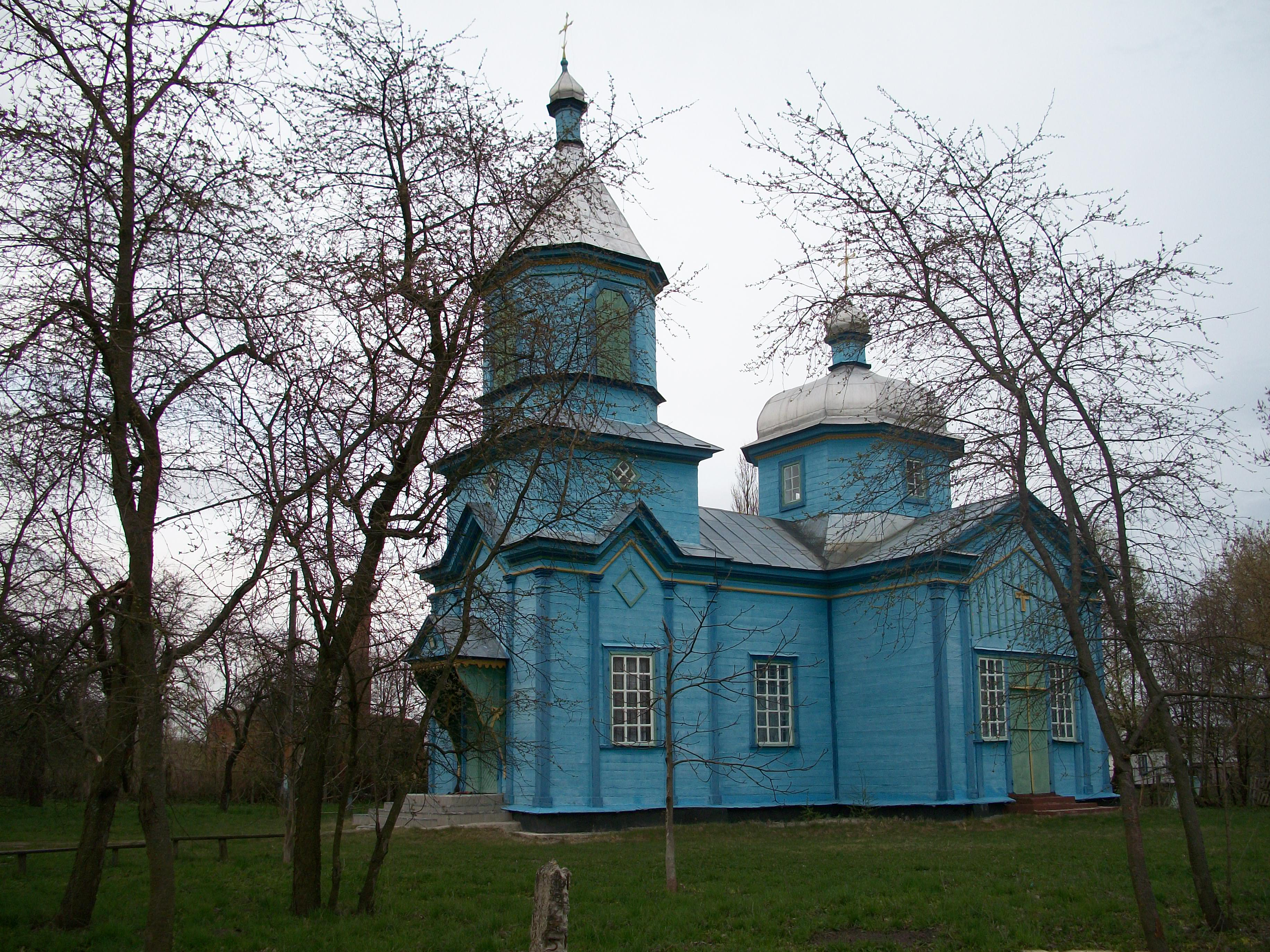
St. Basil the Great Cathedral

In ancient times, the area near Zorokiv was inhabited by the forest-dwelling east Slavic tribe Drevlyans and was subsequently, in the 10th century, incorporated into Kievan Rus. Agricultural settlements are mentioned as early as the 11th century.

Zorokiv's name is rooted in the word "Zro", meaning to "look", and referred to viewing the thick forest that once surrounded the village. It was built near the small creek named the Zorka.

St. Basil the Great Cathedral was built in 1772 with funds gathered from the parishioners themselves. The belltower was added in 1869. The Church served as the village's cultural center. Zorokiv had a village school from at least 1870. Its first teacher was the village priest, father Ilian Panteleimonovich Kulchytsky.

Soviet rule came to Zorokiv for the first time in 1918. The village Soviet was established in 1921. In August 1941 Zorokiv was occupied by German forces, and many of its villagers were active in the partisan movement. One of them, Sophia Macymivna Movchan, was awarded the Order of the Red Star for her service. Overall, 118 of Zorokiv's inhabitants died in the fight against Nazi Germany.
