= Isabelle Nicoloso =

French cyclist

Personal information
- Born: 13 February 1961 (age 65) Domont, France

Sport
- Sport: Track cycling
Medal record
Representing France
Summer Universiade
Gold medal – first place	1983 Edmonton	Points race
Silver medal – second place	1983 Edmonton	Individual sprint
Silver medal – second place	1983 Edmonton	1000m time trial

Isabelle Nicoloso-Verger (born 13 February 1961) is a French track cyclist.

At the 1983 Summer Universiade she won on the track the gold medal in the women's points race and silver medals in the women's sprint and the women's 500 m time trial.

== Honours ==
- World Speed Champion: 1985 (3rd : 1983)
- Speed Champion of France: 1991
- Champion of France over the kilometre: 1990
- Prix des Forges : 2000
- Vice-champion of France on track points: 2000
- Bronze medal at the France speed championships: 1989

== Doping ==
In 1987, she tested positive the week of the federal track championships. She served a six-month suspension and a 1000 FF fine (around 150 €).
