= Marek Kulesza =

Polish cyclist

Personal information
- Born: 5 October 1959 (age 67) Warsaw, Poland

Cycling career
- Sport: Cycling

Marek Kulesza (born 5 October 1959) is a Polish former cyclist. He competed in the team pursuit event at the 1980 Summer Olympics.
