= Jozef Simons (cyclist) =

Belgian cyclist

Personal information
- Born: 1 June 1952 (age 74) Antwerp, Belgium

Cycling career
- Sport: Cycling

Jozef Simons (born 1 June 1952) is a Belgian former cyclist. He competed in the team pursuit event at the 1980 Summer Olympics.
