= Csaba Pálinkás =

Hungarian cyclist

Personal information
- Born: 2 June 1959 Szekszárd, Hungary
- Died: 11 October 2004 (aged 45) Szekszárd, Hungary

Cycling career
- Sport: Cycling

Csaba Pálinkás (2 June 1959 – 11 October 2004) was a Hungarian cyclist. He competed in the team pursuit event at the 1980 Summer Olympics.
