= Molchan =

Molchan, Molčan or Moltchan (Cyrillic: Молчан) is a surname. It is a less frequent form of the Ukrainian surname Movchan and is mainly found in Russia, Belarus, Ukraine, and Slovakia.

- Russia: Molchan, less commonly Movchan
- Ukraine: Movchan, less commonly Molchan
- Czech Republic: Molčan, Molčanová (feminine)
- Slovakia: Molčan, Molčanová (feminine)
- Poland: Mołczan, Mowczan (from Ukrainian)

Notable people with the name include:

- Alex Molčan (born 1997), Slovak tennis player
- George Molchan (1922–2005), American spokesperson
- Vladislav Molchan (born 2000), Russian football player
- Youri Moltchan (born 1983), Russian foil fencer

== See also ==
- 20570 Molchan, minor planet
- Movchan
