= Errol McLean =

Guyanese cyclist

Personal information
- Born: 3 June 1952 (age 74)

Cycling career
- Sport: Cycling

Errol McLean (3 June 1952) is a Guyanese former cyclist. He competed in the 1000m time trial event at the 1980 Summer Olympics.
