= Zsigmond Sarkadi Nagy =

Hungarian cyclist

Personal information
- Born: 20 June 1955 (age 71) Budapest, Hungary

Cycling career
- Sport: Cycling

Zsigmond Sarkadi Nagy (born 20 June 1955) is a Hungarian former cyclist. He competed in the team pursuit event at the 1980 Summer Olympics.
