= Aleksandr Krasnov =

Russian cyclist

Personal information
- Born: 7 April 1960 (age 66) Lebyazhye, Soviet Union

Cycling career
- Sport: Cycling
- Current team: Retired
- Discipline: Road
- Role: Rider

Professional team
- 1990-1991: Lada - Ghzel
Medal record
Men's cycling
Representing Soviet Union
Olympic Games
Gold medal – first place	1980 Moscow	Team pursuit
Summer Universiade
Gold medal – first place	1983 Edmonton	Individual pursuit

Aleksandr Krasnov (born 7 April 1960) is a Soviet former cyclist. He won the gold medal in the Men's team pursuit at the 1980 Summer Olympics.

== Major results ==
1978
UCI Junior Track World Championships

1st Team pursuit (with Konstantin Khrabvzov, Valery Movchan, Sergey Nikitenko)

1981
3rd Overall Olympia's Tour

1st Stage 2

1982
UCI Track World Championships

1st Team pursuit (with Nikolai Manakov, Viktor Manakov, Ivan Mitchenko)

2nd Overall Olympia's Tour
1983
2nd Overall Tour of Sweden
3rd Overall Vuelta al Táchira

1st Stage 4

1984
2nd Overall Österreich-Rundfahrt

1st Stages 3 & 5

1986
1st Overall Giro Ciclistico d'Italia
2nd Baltic Sea Friendship Race
1987
UCI Track World Championships

1st Team pursuit (with Viatcheslav Ekimov, Viktor Manakov, Sergeï Chmelinine)

1st Stage 2 Amateur Ronde van België
1988
1st Stage 5 Vuelta al Táchira
1989
1st Imatran ajot
