= Janusz Sałach =

Polish cyclist

Personal information
- Born: 9 January 1957 (age 69) Toruń, Poland

Cycling career
- Sport: Cycling

Janusz Sałach (born 9 January 1957) is a Polish former cyclist. He competed in the team pursuit event at the 1980 Summer Olympics.
