= Jean-Marc Rebière =

French cyclist

Personal information
- Born: 17 November 1952 (age 73)

Cycling career
- Sport: Cycling

Jean-Marc Rebière (born 17 November 1952) is a French former cyclist. He competed in the team pursuit event at the 1980 Summer Olympics.
