= Stoyan Petrov =

Bulgarian cyclist

Personal information
- Born: 31 March 1956 (age 70)

Cycling career
- Sport: Cycling

Stoyan Petrov (Bulgarian: Стоян Петров, 31 March 1956) is a Bulgarian former cyclist. He competed in the 1000m time trial event at the 1980 Summer Olympics.
