= Ervin Dér =

Hungarian cyclist (1956–2024)

Personal information
- Born: 11 January 1956 Orosháza, Hungary
- Died: 16 January 2024 (aged 68)

Cycling career
- Sport: Cycling

Ervin Dér (11 January 1956 – 16 January 2024) was a Hungarian cyclist. He competed in the team pursuit event at the 1980 Summer Olympics. Dér died on 16 January 2024, at the age of 68.
