= Aleksandr Panfilov =

Soviet racing cyclist (born 1960)

Personal information
- Born: 11 October 1960 (age 66) Bishkek, Soviet Union

Cycling career
- Sport: Cycling
Medal record
Men's cycling
Representing Soviet Union
Olympic Games
Silver medal – second place	1980 Moscow	1000m tme trial
Summer Universiade
Gold medal – first place	1983 Edmonton	1000m time trial

Aleksandr Panfilov (Russian: Алекса́ндр Панфи́лов; born 11 October 1960) is a retired track cyclist who competed for the USSR at the 1980 Summer Olympics in Moscow, winning a silver medal in the 1 km time trial. Panfilov was only 19 years old at the time. He trained at Armed Forces sports society in Tashkent. At the 1983 Summer Universiade he won the gold medal in the 1 km time trial.
