= Gerald Mortag =

East German cyclist (1958–2023)

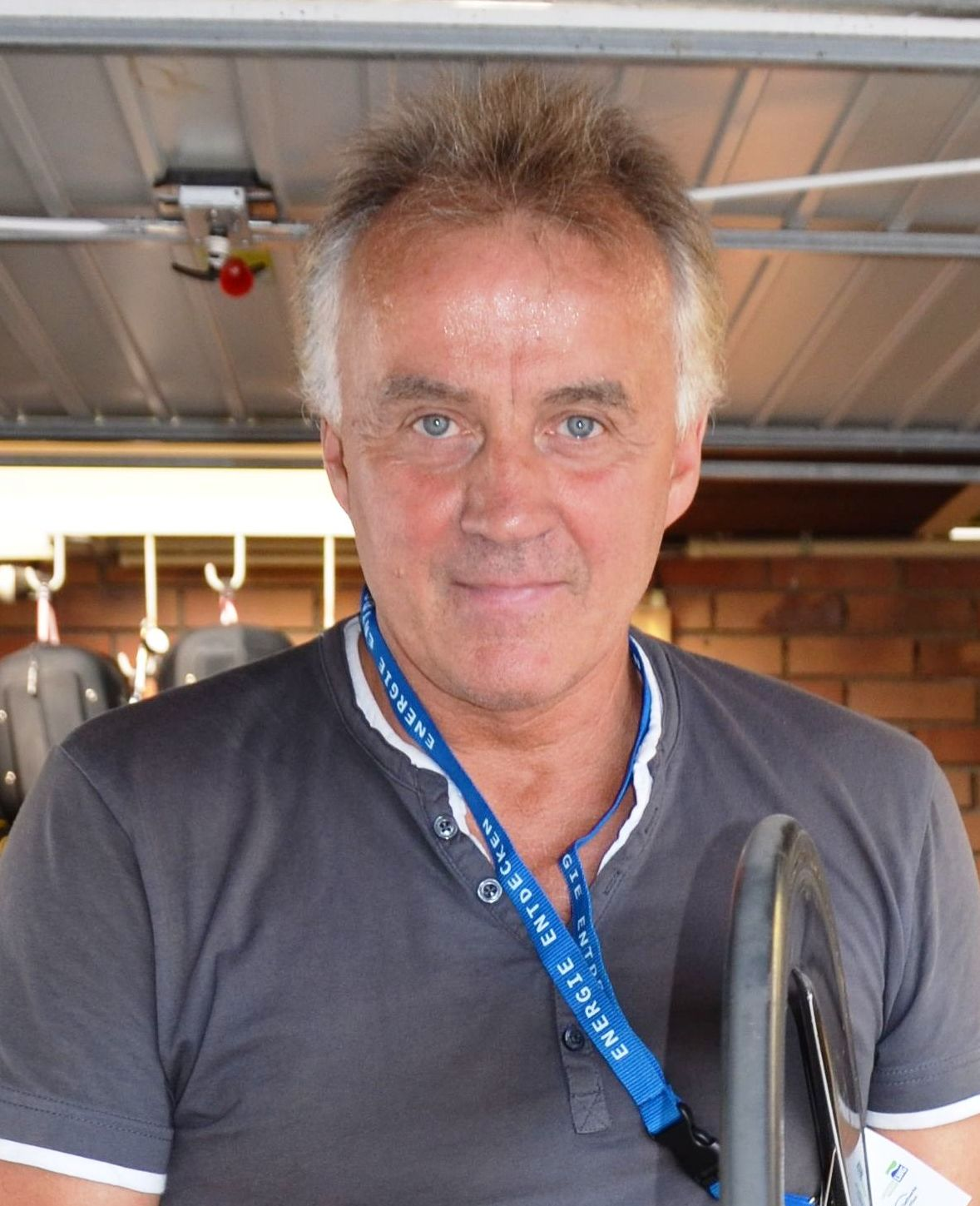

Personal information
- Born: 8 November 1958 Gera, East Germany
- Died: 30 January 2023 (aged 64)
- Height: 1.75 m (5 ft 9 in)
- Weight: 50 kg (110 lb)

Cycling career
- Sport: Cycling
Medal record
Representing East Germany
Olympic Games
Silver medal – second place	1980 Moscow	Team pursuit
Friendship Games
Gold medal – first place	1984 Schleiz	Team pursuit
World Championships
Gold medal – first place	1977 San Cristóbal	Team pursuit
Gold medal – first place	1978 Munich	Team pursuit
Gold medal – first place	1979 Amsterdam	Team pursuit

Gerald Mortag (8 November 1958 – 30 January 2023) was an East German track cyclist. He had his best achievements in the 4000 m team pursuit. In this discipline he won a silver medal at the 1980 Summer Olympics, as well as three gold medals at the world championships in 1977–1979. He missed the 1984 Summer Olympics due to their boycott by East Germany and competed at the Friendship Games instead, winning a gold medal.
