= Julian Movchan =

Julian Movchan (Ukrainian: Юлiан Григорович Mовчан, romanized: Yulian Hryhorovych Movchan, February 19, 1913 – January 6, 2002) was a Ukrainian-American journalist, writer and doctor.

== Biography ==
Julian Movchan

Born in the village of Zorokiv to a family of well-to-do peasants, in the Cherniakhiv region of what is now the Zhytomyr Oblast, his works first appeared in the local oblast newspaper Radianska Volyn when he was fourteen years old. Movchan moved to Zhytomyr to pursue secondary school but, due to his family's persecution as kurkuls, left for Kharkiv, Ukraine's capital at the time where he began a new life. Escaping the ravages of the famine that engulfed most of rural Ukraine, Julian Movchan worked in a factory while editing its newspaper. At this time, he completed his education at an institute for journalism. However, disappointed with increasing censorship of the 1930s and unwilling for moral reasons to join the communist party, Movchan abandoned his career in journalism and entered medical school. When the Soviet Army occupied western Ukraine in 1939, he transferred his studies to Lviv. During the subsequent German occupation, he resumed his journalistic work, denouncing the Stalinist regime. During this time he also treated wounded soldiers of the UPA when they were smuggled into the city. When the Soviets returned, he fled westward and completed his medical studies in Munich. In 1949, he moved to America, eventually settling outside Cleveland, Ohio. He married, and had two children and four grandchildren.

After leaving Ukraine Movchan befriended Volodymyr Vynnychenko, the exiled president of Ukraine. The two had much in common: they were both eastern Ukrainian writers of humble origins with a left-wing but anti-Soviet patriotic Ukrainian political orientation. After Vynnychenko's death, Movchan was invited by his widow to move to France and serve as caretaker of Vynnychenko's archives. Movchan declined, but donated many of Vynnychenko's letters to the archives at Columbia University. Movchan continued to write until his death in January 2002.

== Writings ==
While maintaining a medical practice in the United States, Movchan was a prolific writer, with over 1,800 published articles or letters, primarily but not exclusively in Ukrainian diaspora newspapers. Some of the many journals and newspapers that have included his articles and letters have included: the historically most important Ukrainian diaspora newspaper Svoboda ; Homin Ukrayiny ; Narodnia Volia (newspaper of Ukrainian Social Revolutionaries); Novi Dni; Novoye Russkoye Slovo , and The Militant. Movchan primarily wrote on political and health-care related issues. He also wrote several books, including:

- Doctor's Notes (Записки Лiкария), Toronto, (1966). Collection of anecdotes from medical practice
- Unforgotten and Unforgiven (Незабутне i Непрощене), New York, Buenos Aires (1982); 2nd edition published in Kyiv, Ukraine in 1992. Personal recollection of the life of a kurkul family in the 1920s and 1930s.
- My Travels Around the World (Моi Подорожi Довкола Свiту), New York (1985). Memoirs of his travels throughout the world.
