= Igor Sláma =

Personal information
- Born: 8 May 1959 (age 67) Brno, Czechoslovakia
- Height: 1.75 m (5 ft 9 in)
- Weight: 70 kg (150 lb)

Cycling career
- Sport: Cycling
Medal record
Representing Czech Republic
Olympic Games
Bronze medal – third place	1980 Moscow	Team pursuit
World Championships
Gold medal – first place	1979 Amsterdam	Points race

Igor Sláma (born 8 May 1959) is a retired amateur track cyclist from Czechoslovakia. He won a gold medal in the points race at the 1979 World Championships and a bronze medal in the 4000 m team pursuit at the 1980 Summer Olympics.
