= Martin Penc =

Czech cyclist

Personal information
- Born: 21 May 1957 (age 69) Prague, Czechoslovakia
- Height: 1.80 m (5 ft 11 in)
- Weight: 73 kg (161 lb)

Cycling career
- Sport: Cycling
Medal record
Representing Czech Republic
Olympic Games
Bronze medal – third place	1980 Moscow	Team pursuit
Friendship Games
Silver medal – second place	1984 Schleiz	Points race
World Championships
Gold medal – first place	1985 Bassano del Grappa	Points race, amateurs
Bronze medal – third place	1981 Brno	Team pursuit, amateurs
Bronze medal – third place	1989 Lyon	Points race, professionals

Martin Penc (born 21 May 1957) is a retired cyclist from Czechoslovakia. He finished in eighth and third place in the 4000 m individual and team pursuit, respectively, at the 1980 Summer Olympics. He missed the 1984 Summer Olympics due to their boycott by Czechoslovakia and competed in the Friendship Games instead, winning a silver medal in the individual points race. He won three medals at world championships in 1981, 1985 and 1989 in the team pursuit and points race.
