= Volker Winkler =

East German cyclist

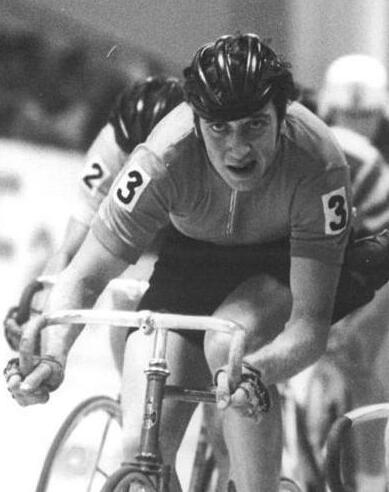
- Winkler in 1977

Personal information
- Born: 20 July 1957 (age 69) Merseburg, East Germany
- Height: 1.84 m (6 ft 0 in)
- Weight: 75 kg (165 lb)

Cycling career
- Sport: Cycling
Medal record
Representing East Germany
Olympic Games
Silver medal – second place	1980 Moscow	Team pursuit
World Championships
Gold medal – first place	1977 San Cristóbal	Team pursuit
Gold medal – first place	1978 Munich	Team pursuit
Gold medal – first place	1979 Amsterdam	Team pursuit
Gold medal – first place	1981 Brno	Team pursuit
Bronze medal – third place	1982 Leicester	Team pursuit

Volker Winkler (born 20 July 1957) is a retired East German track cyclist. He had his best achievements in the 4000 m team pursuit. In this discipline he won a silver medal at the 1980 Summer Olympics, as well as four gold medals at the world championships in 1977–1981.

After retiring from competitions in 1985 he worked as a cycling coach, first at SC Cottbus, the club he was competing for, then at RSC Cottbus, and later at Berlin Cycling Union.
