= Krylatskoye Sports Complex Cycling Circuit =

Cycling lane in Moscow

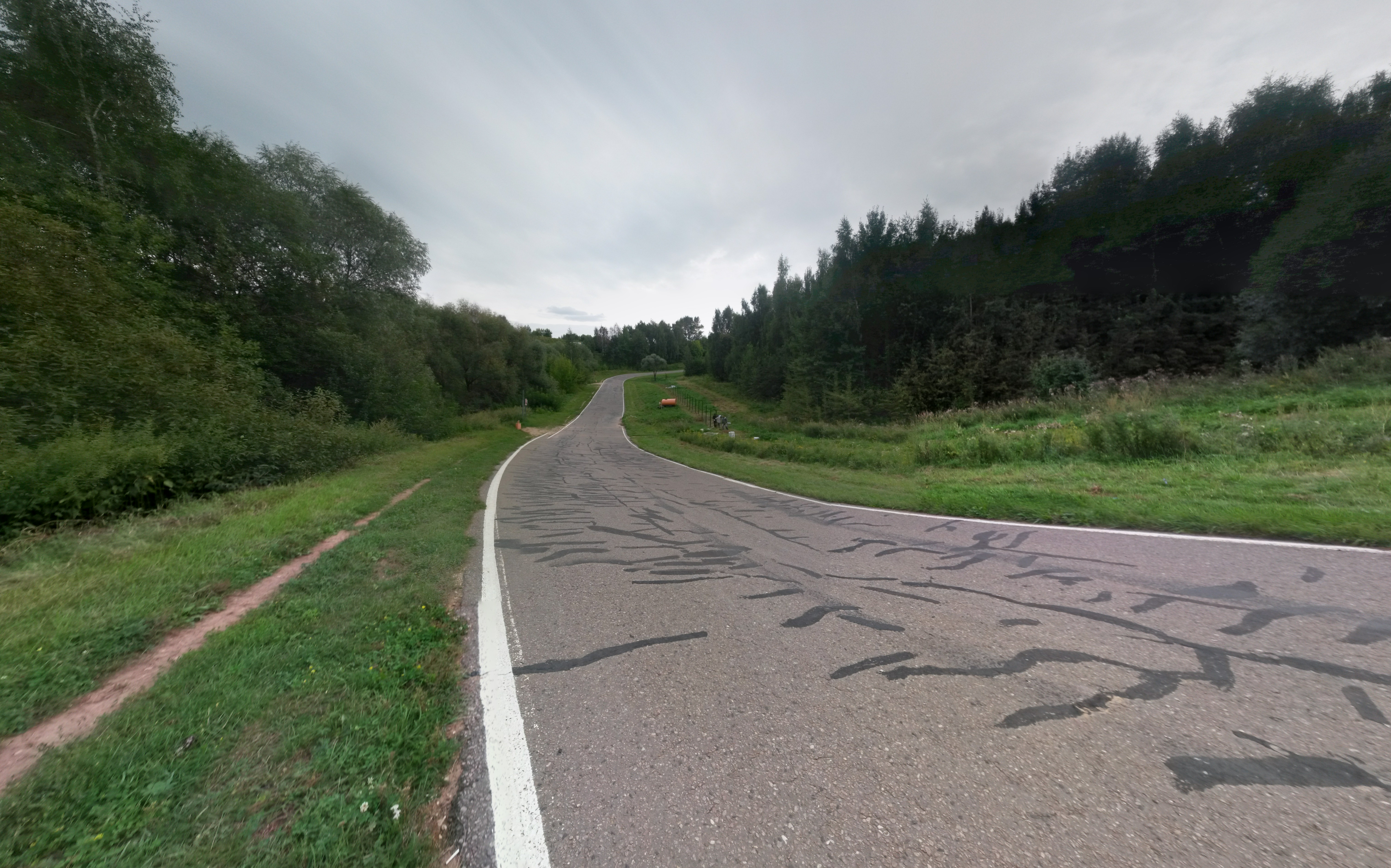
Bicycle track in Moscow

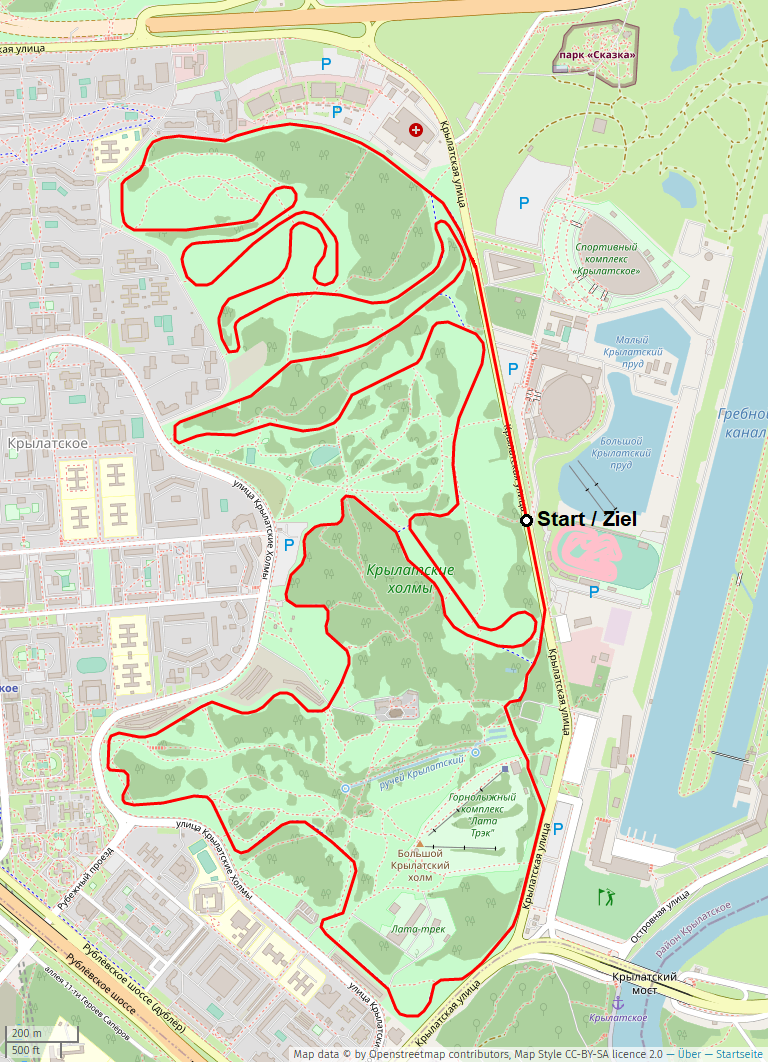
Track map

The Krylatskoye Sports Complex Cycling Circuit is a cycling circuit constructed next to the velodrome used for the track cycling events for the 1980 Summer Olympics in Moscow. The venue, 13.5 km (8.4 mi) long, hosted the individual road race cycling event at those same games.
