= Jiří Pokorný (cyclist) =

Personal information
- Born: 14 October 1956 (age 70) Brno, Czechoslovakia
- Height: 1.82 m (6 ft 0 in)
- Weight: 79 kg (174 lb)

Cycling career
- Sport: Cycling
Medal record
Representing Czech Republic
Olympic Games
Bronze medal – third place	1980 Moscow	Team pursuit
World Championships
Bronze medal – third place	1981 Brno	Team pursuit

Jiří Pokorný (born 14 October 1956) is a retired cyclist from Czechoslovakia. He won a bronze medal in the 4000 m team pursuit at the 1980 Summer Olympics and 1981 World Championships and finished in fifth place at the 1976 Summer Olympics.
