= Teodor Černý =

Personal information
- Born: 18 January 1957 (age 69) Kadaň, Czechoslovakia
- Height: 1.73 m (5 ft 8 in)
- Weight: 74 kg (163 lb)

Cycling career
- Sport: Cycling
Medal record
Representing Czech Republic
Olympic Games
Bronze medal – third place	1980 Moscow	Team pursuit
Friendship Games
Bronze medal – third place	1984 Schleiz	Team pursuit
World Championships
Gold medal – first place	1986 Colorado Springs	Team pursuit

Teodor Černý (born 18 January 1957) is a retired cyclist from Czechoslovakia. He won a bronze medal in the 4000 m team pursuit at the 1980 Summer Olympics. He missed the 1984 Summer Olympics due to their boycott by Czechoslovakia and competed in the Friendship Games instead, winning a bronze medal in the team pursuit. His team won this event at the 1986 World Championships. Individually, his best achievement was second place in the Lidice Race in 1984.
