= Viktor Manakov (cyclist, born 1960) =

Russian cyclist (1960–2019)

Personal information
- Born: 28 July 1960 Budogoshch, Russian SFSR, Soviet Union
- Died: 12 May 2019 (aged 58) Moscow, Russia

Cycling career
- Sport: Cycling
Medal record
Men's cycling
Representing Soviet Union
Olympic Games
Gold medal – first place	1980 Moscow	Team pursuit
Summer Universiade
Gold medal – first place	1983 Edmonton	Team pursuit
Silver medal – second place	1983 Edmonton	Individual pursuit

Viktor Viktorovich Manakov (28 July 1960 – 12 May 2019) was a Russian cyclist. He won the Gold Medal in the Men's team pursuit at the 1980 Summer Olympics. At the 1983 Summer Universiade he won gold in the men's points race and silver in the men's individual pursuit. He was admitted to a Moscow hospital for infectious disease in 2019 and died during surgery.
