= Valery Movchan =

Soviet cyclist (born 1959)

Personal information
- Born: 14 June 1959 (age 67) Sordorovo, Tajik SSR, Soviet Union

Cycling career
- Sport: Cycling
Medal record
Men's cycling
Representing Soviet Union
Olympic Games
Gold medal – first place	1980 Moscow	Team pursuit

Valeriy Ivanovych Movchan (born 14 June 1959) is a Soviet cyclist. He won the gold medal in Men's team pursuit in the 1980 Summer Olympics. He was affiliated with Avangard Kharkiv.
