= Krylatskoye Sports Complex Velodrome =

Velodrome in Moscow, Russia

Krylatskoye Velodrome
- (Russian: велотрек „Крылатское“)
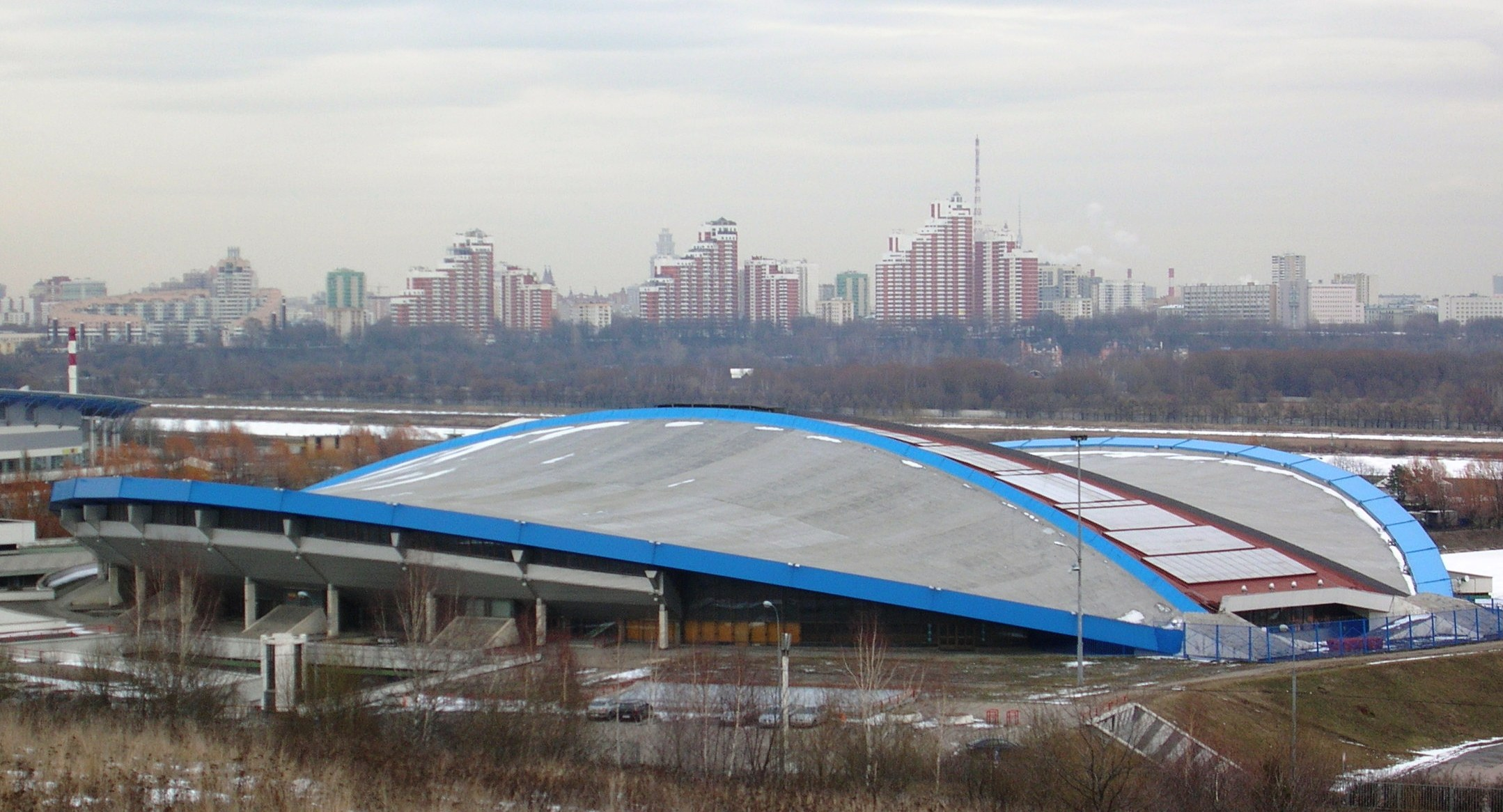
- Velodrome in 2008
- Interactive map of Krylatskoye Velodrome
- Full name: Krylatskoe Sports Center of Trade Unions (Velodrome)
- Location: Krylatskaya Street, 10; Moscow, Russia
- Coordinates: 55°45′47″N 37°25′59″E
- Capacity: 6,000
- Surface: Siberian larch
- Field size: 333.33 metres (1,093 ft 7 in) track
- Public transit: Krylatskoye, Molodyozhnaya (Moscow Metro stations)

Construction
- Built: Jan 1977 — Dec 1979
- Opened: December 28, 1979
- Architects: N. I. Voronina, A. G. Ospennikov

The Krylatskoye Sports Complex Velodrome is an indoor velodrome in the Krylatskoye district of Moscow, Russia. It was built in 1979 according to a design from a team of architects for the 1980 Summer Olympics and hosted the track cycling events. The velodrome is situated on Krylatskaya street, between the Krylatsky Hill and the Rowing Canal.

== Construction ==
This structure is in the shape of an ellipse with axes of 168 and 138 m. The 168 meter-long span of the bike track is covered by two pairs of inclined arches which are connected by a 4 mm thick rolled steel membrane. The velodrome also accommodates 2 tennis courts, 2 squash courts, a martial arts arena, fitness equipment, a sauna, an athletics arena, a cafe/bar, and a hotel.

A 220×90 m archery complex was built next to the velodrome. The complex included a firing line and a line for setting targets at a distance of 30 to 70 m for women and 30 to 90 m for men.

A circular bike route was also constructed in 1979 on the other side of Krylatskaya Street in the Krylatsky Hills. The cycle path has an asphalt surface and a length of 13.64 km and a width of 7 m.

== See also ==
- List of cycling tracks and velodromes
