= 1992 World Juniors Track Cycling Championships =

- Venue: Athens, Greece
- Date: August 1992

The 1992 World Juniors Track Cycling Championships were the 18th annual Junior World Championships for track cycling held in Athens, Greece in August 1992.

The Championships had five events for men (sprint, points race, individual pursuit, team pursuit and 1 kilometre time trial) and two for women (sprint and individual pursuit).

== Events ==
Event	Gold	Silver	Bronze
Men's Events
Sprint	Ivan Quaranta; Italy	Serguei Bokhanisev; CIS	Florian Rousseau; France
Points race	Bernard Panton; Australia	Alexander Simonenko; CIS	Mirko Mariani; Italy
Individual pursuit	Roman Saprykhine; CIS	Alexander Simonenko; CIS	Bogdan Bondariew; CIS
Team pursuit	Roman Saprykhine; Anton Shantyr; Igor Soloviev; Alexei Bjakov; CIS	Marc Obermann; Rüdiger Knispel; Markus Köcknitz; Danilo Hondo; Germany	Matthew White; Bernard Panton; Rodney McGee; Nathan O'Neill; Australia
Time trial	Florian Rousseau; France	Darryn Hill; Australia	Michael Scheurer; Germany

Event	Gold	Silver	Bronze
Women's Events
Sprint	Katrin Freitag; East Germany	Yan Wang; China	Chris Witty; United States
Individual pursuit	Hanka Kupfernagel; Germany	Elena Tchalykh; CIS	Anke Wichmann; Germany

== Medal table ==
* Host nation (Greece)

Rank	Nation	Gold	Silver	Bronze	Total
1	CIS (CIS)	2	4	1	7
2	Germany (GER)	2	1	2	5
3	Australia (AUS)	1	1	1	3
4	France (FRA)	1	0	1	2
4	Italy (ITA)	1	0	1	2
6	China (CHN)	0	1	0	1
7	United States (USA)	0	0	1	1
Totals (7 entries)		7	7	7	21
