= 1991 World Juniors Track Cycling Championships =

- Venue: Colorado Springs, United States
- Date: August 1991

The 1991 World Juniors Track Cycling Championships were the 17th annual Junior World Championships for track cycling held in Colorado Springs, United States in August 1991.

The Championships had five events for men (sprint, points race, individual pursuit, team pursuit and 1 kilometre time trial) and two for women (sprint and individual pursuit).

== Events ==
Event	Gold	Silver	Bronze
Men's Events
Sprint	Roberto Chiappa; Italy	Pavel Buráň; Czech Republic	Darryn Hill; Australia
Points race	Alexander Ivankin; Soviet Union	Danilo Hondo; Germany	Markus Zberg; Switzerland
Individual pursuit	Roman Saprykhine; Soviet Union	Anthon Vermaerke; Belgium	George Hincapie; United States
Team pursuit	Nikolay Kuznetsov; Roman Saprykhine; Alexander Ivankin; Anton Shantyr; Soviet Union	Jörg Wohllaub; Danilo Hondo; Olaf Pollack; Sascha Henrix; Germany	Stuart O'Grady; Rodney McGee; Henk Vogels; Leigh Bryan; Australia
Time trial	Laurent Accart; France	Simon Kersten; Australia	Aldo Capelli; Italy

Event	Gold	Silver	Bronze
Women's Events
Sprint	Katrin Freitag; East Germany	Jessica Grieco; United States	Juliette Raetsch; East Germany
Individual pursuit	Jessica Grieco; United States	Hanka Kupfernagel; Germany	Symenko Jochinke; Australia

== Medal table ==
* Host nation (United States)

Rank	Nation	Gold	Silver	Bronze	Total
1	Soviet Union (URS)	3	0	0	3
2	Germany (GER)	1	3	1	5
3	United States (USA)*	1	1	1	3
4	Italy (ITA)	1	0	1	2
5	France (FRA)	1	0	0	1
6	Australia (AUS)	0	1	3	4
7	Belgium (BEL)	0	1	0	1
7	Czechoslovakia (CSK)	0	1	0	1
9	Switzerland (SWI)	0	0	1	1
Totals (9 entries)		7	7	7	21
