= 2000 World Juniors Track Cycling Championships =

- Venue: Fiorenzuola d'Arda, Italy
- Date: August 2000

The 2000 World Juniors Track Cycling Championships were the 26th annual Junior World Championships for track cycling held in Fiorenzuola d'Arda, Italy in August 2000.

The Championships had six events for men (sprint, points race, individual pursuit, team pursuit, 1 kilometre time trial and team sprint) and four for women (sprint, individual pursuit, 500 metre time trial and points race).

== Events ==
Event	Gold	Silver	Bronze
Men's Events
Sprint	Ryan Bayley; Australia	Eukasz Kwiatkowski; Poland	Andriy Vynokurov; Ukraine
Points race	Davide Tortella; Italy	Peter Dawson; Australia	Eugeni Iakovlev; Russia
Individual pursuit	Volodymyr Dyudya; Ukraine	Tomas Vaitkus; Lithuania	Alexander Serov; Russia
Team pursuit	Sergejus Apionkinas; Vytautas Kaupas; Simas Raguckas; Tomas Vaitkus; Lithuania	Grégory Bernard; Nicolas Rousseau; Romain Genter; William Bonnet; France	Almaz Baigoujine; Alexander Serov; Pavel Brutt; Nikita Eskov; Russia
Time trial	Mark Renshaw; Australia	Andriy Vynokurov; Ukraine	Nicolo Marelli; Italy
Team sprint	Mark Renshaw; Jason Niblett; Ryan Bayley; Australia	Nikolai Dmitriev; Denis Terenen; Sergey Borisov; Russia	Mattia Trevisan; Giovanni Carini; Nikolo Marelli; Italy

Event	Gold	Silver	Bronze
Women's Events
Sprint	Christin Muche; Germany	Valentina Alessio; Italy	Mathilde Doutreluingne; France
Individual pursuit	Juliette Vandekerckhove; France	Katherine Bates; Australia	Charlotte Becker; Germany
Time trial	Kerrie Meares; Australia	Christin Muche; Germany	Mathilde Doutreluingne; France
Points race	Vera Kuedoder; Netherlands	Ashley Kimmet; United States	Juliette Vandekerckhove; France

== Medal table ==
* Host nation (Italy)

Rank	Nation	Gold	Silver	Bronze	Total
1	Australia (AUS)	4	2	0	6
2	France (FRA)	1	1	3	5
3	Italy (ITA)*	1	1	2	4
4	Germany (GER)	1	1	1	3
4	Ukraine (UKR)	1	1	1	3
6	Lithuania (LTU)	1	1	0	2
7	Netherlands (NED)	1	0	0	1
8	Russia (RUS)	0	1	3	4
9	Poland (POL)	0	1	0	1
9	United States (USA)	0	1	0	1
Totals (10 entries)		10	10	10	30
