= 1988 World Juniors Track Cycling Championships =

- Venue: Odense, Denmark
- Date: August 1988

The 1988 World Juniors Track Cycling Championships were the 14th annual Junior World Championships for track cycling held in Odense, Denmark in August 1988.

The Championships had five events for men (sprint, points race, individual pursuit, team pursuit and 1 kilometre time trial) and two for women (sprint and individual pursuit).

== Events ==
Event	Gold	Silver	Bronze
Men's Events
Sprint	Jens Fiedler; East Germany	Gianluca Capitano; Italy	Oleg Lutshishin; Soviet Union
Points race	Andreas Beikirch; Germany	Claudio Camin; Italy	Dobrin Vasilev; Bulgaria
Individual pursuit	Dmitry Nelyubin; Soviet Union	Evgueny Anachkine; Soviet Union	Nathan Page; Australia
Team pursuit	Dmitry Nelyubin; Alexander Gontchenkov; Valeri Butaro; Evgueny Anachkine; Soviet Union	Darren Winter; Nathan Page; Mark Kingsland; David Bink; Australia	Guido Fulst; Jürgen Werner; Ingo Claus; Matthias Friedel; East Germany
Time trial	Kai Melcher; East Germany	K Valtchev; Bulgaria	Sergei Bagmat; Soviet Union

Event	Gold	Silver	Bronze
Women's Events
Sprint	Félicia Ballanger; France	Maria Evitejeva; Soviet Union	Isabelle Nguyen Van Tu; France
Individual pursuit	Catherine Marsal; France	Svetlana Golovnia; Soviet Union	Gabriella Pregnolato; Italy

== Medal table ==
* Host nation (Denmark)

Rank	Nation	Gold	Silver	Bronze	Total
1	Soviet Union (URS)	2	3	2	7
2	East Germany (DDR)	2	0	1	3
2	France (FRA)	2	0	1	3
4	Germany (GER)	1	0	0	1
5	Italy (ITA)	0	2	1	3
6	Australia (AUS)	0	1	1	2
6	Bulgaria (BUL)	0	1	1	2
Totals (7 entries)		7	7	7	21
