= 2005 UCI Juniors Track World Championships =

- Venue: Vienna, Austria
- Date: 7–10 August 2005

The 2005 UCI Juniors Track World Championships were the 31st annual Junior World Championships for track cycling held at Vienna, in Austria, from 7 to 10 August.

The Championships had nine events for men (sprint, points race, individual pursuit, team pursuit, 1 kilometre time trial, team sprint, keirin, madison and scratch race) and six for women (sprint, individual pursuit, 500 metre time trial, points race, keirin, scratch race).

== Events ==
Event	Gold	Silver	Bronze
Men's Events
Sprint	Maximilian Levy; Germany	Kévin Sireau; France	Benjamin Wittmann; Germany
Points race	Egidijus Jursys; Lithuania	Michel Kreder; Netherlands	Roman Maximov; Russia
Individual pursuit	Andrew Tennant; England	Sam Bewley; New Zealand	Ivan Rovny; Russia
Team pursuit	Sam Bewley; Westley Gough; Jesse Sergent; Darren Shea; New Zealand	Steven Burke; Ross Sander; Ian Stannard; Andrew Tennant; United Kingdom	Zak Dempster; Cameron Meyer; Mitchell Pearson; Matthew Pettit; Australia
Time trial	Maximilian Levy; Germany	Kévin Sireau; France	Scott Sunderland; Australia
Team sprint	René Enders; Maximilian Levy; Benjamin Wittmann; Germany	Michaël D'Almeida; Kévin Sireau; Alexandre Volant; France	Daniel Ellis; Jeremy Hogg; Scott Sunderland; Australia
Keirin	Christos Volikakis; Greece	Rafal Poper; Poland	René Enders; Germany
Madison	Alexey Shiryaev; Andrey Klyuev; Russia	Marcel Kalz; Norman Dimde; Germany	Mitchell Pearson; Cameron Meyer; Australia
Scratch race	Philipp Klein; Germany	Oleksandr Polivoda; Ukraine	Loïc Perizzolo; Switzerland

Event	Gold	Silver	Bronze
Women's Events
Sprint	Lisandra Guerra; Cuba	Anna Blyth; United Kingdom	Elodie Henriette; France
Individual pursuit	Lesya Kalytovska; Ukraine	Bianca Rogers; Australia	Kimberly Geist; United States
Time trial	Lisandra Guerra; Cuba	Lyubov Basova-Shulika; Ukraine	Sandie Clair; France
Points race	Andrea Wölfer; Switzerland	Rushlee Buchanan; New Zealand	Irina Zemlyanskaya; Russia
Keirin	Chloe MacPherson; Australia	Park Eun-mi; South Korea	Anna Blyth; United Kingdom
Scratch race	Skye Lee Armstrong; Australia	Elizabeth Armitstead; United Kingdom	Evgenia Romanyuta; Russia

== Medal table ==
* Host nation (Austria)

Rank	Nation	Gold	Silver	Bronze	Total
1	Germany (GER)	4	1	2	7
2	Australia (AUS)	2	1	4	7
3	Cuba (CUB)	2	0	0	2
4	Great Britain (GBR)	1	3	1	5
5	New Zealand (NZL)	1	2	0	3
5	Ukraine (UKR)	1	2	0	3
7	Russia (RUS)	1	0	4	5
8	Switzerland (SWI)	1	0	1	2
9	Greece (GRE)	1	0	0	1
9	Lithuania (LIT)	1	0	0	1
11	France (FRA)	0	3	2	5
12	Netherlands (NED)	0	1	0	1
12	Poland (POL)	0	1	0	1
12	South Korea (KOR)	0	1	0	1
15	United States (USA)	0	0	1	1
Totals (15 entries)		15	15	15	45
