= 1989 World Juniors Track Cycling Championships =

- Venue: Moscow, Soviet Union
- Date: August 1989

The 1989 World Juniors Track Cycling Championships were the 15th annual Junior World Championships for track cycling held in Moscow, Soviet Union in August 1989.

The Championships had five events for men (sprint, points race, individual pursuit, team pursuit and 1 kilometre time trial) and three for women (sprint, individual pursuit and points race).

== Events ==
Event	Gold	Silver	Bronze
Men's Events
Sprint	Gianluca Capitano; Italy	Jaroslav Jeřábek; Slovakia	Eduard Gruner; Soviet Union
Points race	Patrick Vetsch; Switzerland	Mojmir Andrys; Czech Republic	Brett Aitken; Australia
Individual pursuit	Dmitry Nelyubin; Soviet Union	Vasyl Yakovlev; Ukraine	Servais Knaven; Netherlands
Team pursuit	Dmitry Nelyubin; Oleg Klevtsov; Sergei Beloskalenko; Oleg Pletnikov; Soviet Union	Simon Lalder; Brett Aitken; David Bink; Nathan Page; Australia	Jan Küchnert; Andreas Neumann; Jan Norden; Heiko Rüchel; East Germany
Time trial	Konstantin Smurygin; Soviet Union	Tom Steels; Belgium	Kai Melcher; East Germany

Event	Gold	Silver	Bronze
Women's Events
Sprint	Magali Humbert-Faure; France	Sara Felloni; Italy	Valentina Lipa; Soviet Union
Individual pursuit	Svetlana Samokhvalova; Russia	Natascha den Ouden; Netherlands	Ainhoa Ostolaza; Spain
Points race	Svetlana Samokhvalova; Russia	Sally Dawes; United Kingdom	Jessica Grieco; United States

== Medal table ==
* Host nation (Soviet Union)

Rank	Nation	Gold	Silver	Bronze	Total
1	Soviet Union (URS)* (Note: This includes the two gold medals for Svetlana Samokhvalova (Russia) and the silver medal for Vasyl Yakovlev (Ukraine))	5	1	2	8
2	Italy (ITA)	1	1	0	2
3	France (FRA)	1	0	0	1
3	Switzerland (SWI)	1	0	0	1
5	Czechoslovakia (CSK) (Note: This includes the two silver medals for Jaroslav Jeřábek (Slovakia) and Mojmir Andrys (Czech Republic))	0	2	0	2
6	Australia (AUS)	0	1	1	2
6	Netherlands (NED)	0	1	1	2
8	Belgium (BEL)	0	1	0	1
8	Great Britain (GBR)	0	1	0	1
10	East Germany (DDR)	0	0	2	2
11	Spain (ESP)	0	0	1	1
11	United States (USA)	0	0	1	1
Totals (12 entries)		8	8	8	24
