= 1998 World Juniors Track Cycling Championships =

- Venue: Havana, Cuba
- Date: August 1998

The 1998 World Juniors Track Cycling Championships were the 24th annual Junior World Championships for track cycling held at the Velodromo Reinaldo Paseiro in Havana, Cuba in August 1998.

The Championships had six events for men (sprint, points race, individual pursuit, team pursuit, 1 kilometre time trial and team sprint) and four for women (sprint, individual pursuit, 500 metre time trial and points race).

== Events ==
Event	Gold	Silver	Bronze
Men's Events
Sprint	Michael Quemener; France	Arasaud Duble; France	Jérôme Hubschwerlin; France
Points race	Serguei Klimov; Russia	Jens Mouris; Netherlands	Emmanuel Bertoldi; France
Individual pursuit	Bradley Wiggins; United Kingdom	Daniel Palicki; Germany	Thue Houlberg Hansen; Denmark
Team pursuit	Mark Schneider; Daniel Schlegel; Marc Altmann; Daniel Palicki; Germany	Giordano Colombini; Paolo Menaspa; Angelo Ciccone; Filippo Pozzato; Italy	Michael Moureceki; Stanislav Kozubek; Josef Kankovsky; Libor Hlavac; Czech Republic
Time trial	Ben Kersten; Australia	Yosvany Pol; Cuba	Jérôme Hubschwerlin; France
Team sprint	Arnaud Duble; Michael Quemener; Thomas Montano; France	Joshua Rogash; Jobie Dajka; Ben Kersten; Australia	Mattia Vecchi; Marco Brossa; Marco Garzotto; Italy

Event	Gold	Silver	Bronze
Women's Events
Sprint	Rosealee Hubbard; Australia	Rahna Demarte; Australia	Daniela Claussnitzer; Germany
Individual pursuit	Alayna Burns; Australia	Alison Wright; Australia	Regina Rettke; Germany
Time trial	Rahna Demarte; Australia	Daniela Claussnitzer; Germany	Celine Mivert; France
Points race	Vera Carrara; Italy	Olga Zabelinskaya; Russia	Dorota Czynszak; Poland

== Medal table ==
* Host nation (Cuba)

Rank	Nation	Gold	Silver	Bronze	Total
1	Australia (AUS)	4	3	0	7
2	France (FRA)	2	1	4	7
3	Germany (GER)	1	2	2	5
4	Italy (ITA)	1	1	1	3
5	Russia (RUS)	1	1	0	2
6	Great Britain (GBR)	1	0	0	1
7	Cuba (CUB)*	0	1	0	1
7	Netherlands (NED)	0	1	0	1
9	Czech Republic (CZE)	0	0	1	1
9	Denmark (DEN)	0	0	1	1
9	Poland (POL)	0	0	1	1
Totals (11 entries)		10	10	10	30
