= 1984 World Juniors Track Cycling Championships =

- Venue: Beuvron, France
- Date: August 1984

The 1984 World Juniors Track Cycling Championships were the tenth annual Junior World Championships for track cycling held in Beuvron, France in August 1984.

The Championships had five events for men only: Sprint, Points race, Individual pursuit, Team pursuit and 1 kilometre time trial.

== Events ==
Event	Gold	Silver	Bronze
Men's Events
Sprint	Michael Schulze; East Germany	Omar Mtchedlischwili; Soviet Union	Jens Glücklich; East Germany
Points race	Viatcheslav Ekimov; Russia	Johan Devos; Belgium	P Lucchini; Italy
Individual pursuit	Dean Woods; Australia	Viatcheslav Ekimov; Russia	Mikhail Svechnikov; Soviet Union
Team pursuit	Viatcheslav Ekimov; Evgeni Murin; Mikhail Svechnikov; Dimitri Denkov; Soviet Union	Frank Egner; Volker Kirn; Michael Kotter; Siegurt Müller; East Germany	Klaus Kynde; Johnny Franck; Kenneth Lyngholm; Torben Steen Jakobsen; Denmark
Time trial	Jens Glücklich; East Germany	Craig Alan Schommer; United States	Fr Egner; Germany

== Medal table ==
* Host nation (France)

Rank	Nation	Gold	Silver	Bronze	Total
1	Soviet Union (URS)	2	2	1	5
2	East Germany (DDR)	2	1	1	4
3	Australia (AUS)	1	0	0	1
4	Belgium (BEL)	0	1	0	1
4	United States (USA)	0	1	0	1
6	Denmark (DEN)	0	0	1	1
6	Germany (GER)	0	0	1	1
6	Italy (ITA)	0	0	1	1
Totals (8 entries)		5	5	5	15
