= 2004 UCI Juniors Track World Championships =

- Venue: Los Angeles, United States
- Date: 28 July–4 August 2004

The 2004 UCI Juniors Track World Championships were the 30th annual Junior World Championships for track cycling held at Los Angeles, in the United States, from 28 July to 4 August.

The Championships had nine events for men (sprint, points race, individual pursuit, team pursuit, 1 kilometre time trial, team sprint, keirin, madison and scratch race) and six for women (sprint, individual pursuit, 500 metre time trial, points race, keirin, scratch race).

== Events ==
Event	Gold	Silver	Bronze
Men's Events
Sprint	Shane Perkins; Australia	Michael Blatchford; United States	Maximilian Levy; Germany
Points race	Marcel Barth; Germany	Miles Olman; Australia	Jérémy Besson; France
Individual pursuit	Michael Ford; Australia	Sascha Damrow; Germany	Patrick Gretsch; Germany
Team pursuit	Miles Olman; Michael Ford; Matthew Goss; Simon Clarke; Australia	Matthias Hahn; Stefan Schäfer; Patrick Gretsch; Sascha Damrow; Germany	Andrey Klyuev; Sergey Kolesnikov; Ivan Kovalev; Alexei Bayer; Russia
Time trial	Maximilian Levy; Germany	Dong-jin Kang; South Korea	David Cabrol; France
Team sprint	Robert Förstemann; Maximilian Levy; Benjamin Wittmann; Germany	Yu Onishi; Atsushi Shibasaki; Kazumichi Sugata; Japan	Corey Heath; Shane Perkins; Daniel Thorsen; Australia
Keirin	Shane Perkins; Australia	Daniel Thorsen; Australia	Francesco Kanda; Italy
Madison	Miles Olman; Matthew Goss; Australia	Tim Roels; Tim Mertens; Belgium	Tuanua Zahn; Jérémy Besson; France
Scratch race	Geraint Thomas; United Kingdom	Luis Mansilla; Chile	Alexandru Pliuschin; Moldova

Event	Gold	Silver	Bronze
Women's Events
Sprint	Guo Shuang; China	Jin A You; South Korea	Miriam Welte; Germany
Individual pursuit	Marlijn Binnendijk; Netherlands	Bianca Rogers; Australia	Kimberly Geist; United States
Time trial	Guo Shuang; China	Miriam Welte; Germany	Jane Gerisch; Germany
Points race	Amanda Spratt; Australia	Choe Sun Ae; South Korea	Florence Girardet; France
Keirin	Guo Shuang; China	Miriam Welte; Germany	Skye Lee Armstrong; Australia
Scratch race	Annalisa Cucinotta; Italy	Jarmila Machačová; Czech Republic	Bianca Rogers; Australia

== Medal table ==
* Host nation (United States)

Rank	Nation	Gold	Silver	Bronze	Total
1	Australia (AUS)	6	3	3	12
2	Germany (GER)	3	4	4	11
3	China (CHN)	3	0	0	3
4	Italy (ITA)	1	0	1	2
5	Great Britain (GBR)	1	0	0	1
5	Netherlands (NED)	1	0	0	1
7	South Korea (KOR)	0	3	0	3
8	United States (USA)*	0	1	1	2
9	Belgium (BEL)	0	1	0	1
9	Chile (CHI)	0	1	0	1
9	Czech Republic (CZE)	0	1	0	1
9	Japan (JPN)	0	1	0	1
13	France (FRA)	0	0	4	4
14	Moldova (MDA)	0	0	1	1
14	Russia (RUS)	0	0	1	1
Totals (15 entries)		15	15	15	45
