= 2011 UCI Juniors Track World Championships =

- Venue: Moscow, Russia
- Date: 17–21 August 2011

The 2011 UCI Juniors Track World Championships were the 37th annual Junior World Championships for track cycling held at Moscow, in Russia, from 17 to 21 August.

The Championships had ten events for men (sprint, points race, individual pursuit, team pursuit, 1 kilometre time trial, team sprint, keirin, madison, scratch race, omnium) and nine for women (sprint, individual pursuit, 500 metre time trial, points race, keirin, scratch race, team sprint, team pursuit, omnium).

== Events ==
Event	Gold	Silver	Bronze
Men's Events
Sprint	John Paul; Scotland	Julien Palma; France	Max Niederlag; Germany
Points race	Dominic Weinstein; Germany	Mher Mkrtchyan; Armenia	Alex Frame; New Zealand
Individual pursuit	Park Sang-hoon; South Korea	Moritz Schaffner; Germany	Jackson Law; Australia
Team pursuit	Alexander Morgan; Jackson Law; Alexander Edmondson; Jack Cummings; Australia	Evgeny Zateshilov; Andrey Sazanov; Alexey Ryabkin; Roman Ivlev; Russia	Dylan Kennett; Fraser Gough; Alex Frame; Scott Creighton; New Zealand
Time trial	Jaron Gardiner; Australia	Benjamin Edelin; France	Matthew Baranoski; United States
Team sprint	Pascal Ackermann; Benjamin König; Max Niederlag; Germany	Benjamin Edelin; Anthony Jacques; Julien Palma; France	Victor Nenastin; Alexander Sharapov; Nikita Shurshin; Russia
Keirin	Julien Palma; France	Nikita Shurshin; Russia	Edgar Verdugo; Mexico
Madison	Alexander Edmondson; Jackson Law; Australia	Alex Frame; Fraser Gough; New Zealand	Julio Amores; José Camilo Romero Alonso; Spain
Scratch race	František Sisr; Czech Republic	Mher Mkrtchyan; Armenia	Ioannis Spanopoulos; Greece
Omnium	Caleb Ewan; Australia	Roman Ivlev; Russia	Dylan Kennett; New Zealand

Event	Gold	Silver	Bronze
Women's Events
Sprint	Anastasia Voynova; Russia	Stephanie McKenzie; New Zealand	Victoria Williamson; United Kingdom
Individual pursuit	Mieke Kröger; Germany	Georgia Williams; New Zealand	Alexandra Chekina; Russia
Time trial	Anastasia Voynova; Russia	Victoria Williamson; United Kingdom	Daria Shmeleva; Russia
Points race	Maria Giulia Confalonieri; Italy	Íngrid Drexel; Mexico	Sophie Williamson; New Zealand
Keirin	Anastasia Voynova; Russia	Stephanie McKenzie; New Zealand	Jennifer Valente; United States
Scratch race	Jennifer Valente; United States	Georgia Baker; Australia	Cassie Cameron; New Zealand
Team sprint	Daria Shmeleva; Anastasia Voynova; Russia	Taylah Jennings; Adele Sylvester; Australia	Stephanie McKenzie; Paige Patterson; New Zealand
Team pursuit	Georgia Baker; Taylah Jennings; Emily Roper; Australia	Alina Bondarenko; Alexandra Chekina; Svetlana Kashirina; Russia	Beatrice Bartelloni; Maria Giulia Confalonieri; Chiara Vannucci; Italy
Omnium	Taylah Jennings; Australia	Alina Bondarenko; Russia	Íngrid Drexel; Mexico

== Medal table ==
* Host nation (Russia)

Rank	Nation	Gold	Silver	Bronze	Total
1	Australia (AUS)	6	2	1	9
2	Russia (RUS)*	4	5	3	12
3	Germany (GER)	3	1	1	5
4	France (FRA)	1	3	0	4
5	Great Britain (GBR)	1	1	1	3
6	United States (USA)	1	0	2	3
7	Italy (ITA)	1	0	1	2
8	Czech Republic (CZE)	1	0	0	1
8	South Korea (KOR)	1	0	0	1
10	New Zealand (NZL)	0	4	6	10
11	Armenia (ARM)	0	2	0	2
12	Mexico (MEX)	0	1	2	3
13	Greece (GRE)	0	0	1	1
13	Spain (SPA)	0	0	1	1
Totals (14 entries)		19	19	19	57
