= 1977 World Juniors Track Cycling Championships =

- Venue: Vienna, Austria
- Date: August 1977

The 1977 World Juniors Track Cycling Championships were the third annual Junior World Championships for track cycling held in Vienna, Austria in August 1977.

The Championships had five events for men only. The Sprint, Points race, Individual pursuit and Team pursuit were carried forward from the previous edition, while the 1 kilometre time trial was held for the first time.

== Events ==
Event	Gold	Silver	Bronze
Men's events
Sprint	Lutz Heßlich; East Germany	Sergei Kopylov; Soviet Union	Detlef Uibel; East Germany
Points race	Miroslav Junec; Czechoslovakia	Rüdiger Leitlof; West Germany	Allan Peiper; Australia
Individual pursuit	Hans-Joachim Pohl; East Germany	Thomas Schnelle; East Germany	Viatcheslav Soumarkov; Soviet Union
Team pursuit	Thomas Schnelle; Hans-Joachim Pohl; Robby Gerlach; Jürgen Kummer; East Germany	Christian Goldschagg; Ralf Wicke; Markus Intra; Bodo Zehner; West Germany	Vlatcheslav Soumarokov; Alexandre Krasnov; Alexandre Moustavine; Viktor Manakov; Soviet Union
Time trial	Rainer Hönisch; East Germany	Miroslav Junec; Czechoslovakia	Heinz Isler; Switzerland

== Medal table ==
* Host nation (Austria)

Rank	Nation	Gold	Silver	Bronze	Total
1	East Germany (GDR)	4	1	1	6
2	Czech Republic (CZE)	1	1	0	2
3	West Germany (FRG)	0	2	0	2
4	Soviet Union (URS)	0	1	2	3
5	Australia (AUS)	0	0	1	1
5	Switzerland (SUI)	0	0	1	1
Totals (6 entries)		5	5	5	15
