= 2003 UCI Juniors Track World Championships =

- Venue: Moscow, Russia
- Date: 20–24 August 2003

The 2003 UCI Juniors Track World Championships were the 29th annual Junior World Championships for track cycling held at Moscow, in Russia, from 20 to 24 August.

The Championships had nine events for men (sprint, points race, individual pursuit, team pursuit, 1 kilometre time trial, team sprint, keirin, madison and scratch race) and six for women (sprint, individual pursuit, 500 metre time trial, points race, keirin, scratch race).

== Events ==
Event	Gold	Silver	Bronze
Men's Events
Sprint	Tsubasa Kitatsuru; Japan	Grégory Baugé; France	Sebastian Döhrer; Germany
Points race	Miles Olman; Australia	Mickaël Delage; France	Dmytro Grabovskyy; Ukraine
Individual pursuit	Alexander Khatuntsev; Russia	Michael Ford; Australia	Chris Pascoe; Australia
Team pursuit	Konstantin Demura; Nikolay Trusov; Anton Mindlin; Mikhail Ignatiev; Russia	Frank Schulz; Christian Kux; Stefan Schäfer; Sascha Damrow; Germany	Sean Finning; Michael Ford; Chris Pascoe; Andrew Wyper; Australia
Time trial	Filip Ditzel; Czech Republic	Didier Henriette; France	Dominik Harzheim; Germany
Team sprint	Dominik Harzheim; Daniel Giese; Sebastian Döhrer; Germany	Anton Rudoy; Stoyan Vasev; Denis Dmitriev; Russia	Pawel Kosciecha; Kamil Kuczyński; Michal Tokarz; Poland
Keirin	Tsubasa Kitatsuru; Japan	Daniel Thorsen; Australia	Mikhail Shikhalev; Russia
Madison	Nikolay Trusov; Mikhail Ignatiev; Russia	Marcel Barth; Leonardo Pappalardo; Germany	Wim Stroetinga; Niels Pieters; Netherlands
Scratch race	Sebastien Desplanques; France	Kamil Kuczyński; Poland	Daniel Thorsen; Australia

Event	Gold	Silver	Bronze
Women's Events
Sprint	Guo Shuang; China	Ryu Lin Ah; South Korea	Anastasia Chulkova; Russia
Individual pursuit	Jessie MacLean; Australia	Egle Cekanauskaite; Lithuania	Marlijn Binnendijk; Netherlands
Time trial	Guo Shuang; China	Qian Wang; China	Emilie Jeannot; France
Points race	Larssyn Staley; United States	Agne Bagdonaviciute; Lithuania	Laura Telle; Latvia
Keirin	Rebecca Borgo; Australia	Jane Gerisch; Germany	Ekaterina Merzlikina; Russia
Scratch race	Myriam Morreau; France	Ekaterina Merzlikina; Russia	Lee Min-hye; South Korea

== Medal table ==
* Host nation (Russia)

Rank	Nation	Gold	Silver	Bronze	Total
1	Australia (AUS)	3	2	3	8
1	Russia (RUS)*	3	2	3	8
3	France (FRA)	2	3	1	6
4	China (CHN)	2	1	0	3
5	Japan (JPN)	2	0	0	2
6	Germany (GER)	1	3	2	6
7	Czech Republic (CZE)	1	0	0	1
7	United States (USA)	1	0	0	1
9	Lithuania (LTU)	0	2	0	2
10	Poland (POL)	0	1	1	2
10	South Korea (KOR)	0	1	1	2
12	Netherlands (NED)	0	0	2	2
13	Latvia (LAT)	0	0	1	1
13	Ukraine (UKR)	0	0	1	1
Totals (14 entries)		15	15	15	45
