= 2010 UCI Juniors Track World Championships =

- Venue: Montichiari, Italy
- Date: 11–15 August 2010

The 2010 UCI Juniors Track World Championships were the 36th annual Junior World Championships for track cycling held at Montichiari, in Italy, from 11 to 15 August.

The Championships had ten events for men (sprint, points race, individual pursuit, team pursuit, 1 kilometre time trial, team sprint, keirin, madison, scratch race, omnium) and nine for women (sprint, individual pursuit, 500 metre time trial, points race, keirin, scratch race, team sprint, team pursuit, omnium).

== Events ==
Event	Gold	Silver	Bronze
Men's Events
Sprint	Matthew Glaetzer; Australia	Stefan Bötticher; Germany	Maddison Hammond; Australia
Points race	Jordan Kerby; Australia	Stéphane Lemoine; France	Kirill Sveshnikov; Russia
Individual pursuit	Lasse Norman Hansen; Denmark	Dale Parker; Australia	Viktor Manakov; Russia
Team pursuit	Mitchell Lovelock-Fay; Jackson Law; Jordan Kirby; Edward Bissaker; Australia	Simon Yates; Daniel McLay; Samuel Harrison; Owain Doull; United Kingdom	Kersten Thiele; Christopher Muche; Lucas Liss; Maximilian Beyer; Germany
Time trial	Bernard Esterhuizen; South Africa	Julien Palma; France	Maddison Hammond; Australia
Team sprint	Benjamin Edelin; Kevin Guillot; Julien Palma; France	Matthew Glaetzer; Jamie Green; Maddison Hammond; Australia	Stefan Bötticher; Philip Hindes; Robert Kanter; Germany
Keirin	Matthew Glaetzer; Australia	Mauricio Quiroga; Argentina	Matthew Baranoski; United States
Madison	Daniel McLay; Simon Yates; United Kingdom	Roman Ivlev; Kirill Sveshnikov; Russia	Stéphane Lemoine; Yoan Verardo; France
Scratch race	Pavel Karpenkov; Russia	Bryan Coquard; France	Didier Caspers; Netherlands
Omnium	Bryan Coquard; France	Samuel Harrison; United Kingdom	Lucas Liss; Germany

Event	Gold	Silver	Bronze
Women's Events
Sprint	Hye-jin Lee; South Korea	Ekaterina Gnidenko; Russia	Holly Williams; Australia
Individual pursuit	Amy Cure; Australia	Laura Trott-Kenny; United Kingdom	Marlies Mejías; Cuba
Time trial	Hye-jin Lee; South Korea	Tania Calvo; Spain	Anastasia Voynova; Russia
Points race	Julie Leth; Denmark	Laura Trott-Kenny; United Kingdom	Gloria Rodríguez; Spain
Keirin	Ekaterina Gnidenko; Russia	Holly Williams; Australia	Sara Consolati; Italy
Scratch race	Amy Cure; Australia	Harriet Owen; United Kingdom	Elena Cecchini; Italy
Team sprint	Ekaterina Gnidenko; Anastasia Voynova; Russia	Stephanie McKenzie; Henrietta Mitchell; New Zealand	Adele Sylvester; Holly Williams; Australia
Team pursuit	Michaela Anderson; Amy Cure; Isabella King; Australia	Alexandra Neems; Elizabeth Steel; Georgia Williams; New Zealand	Claudia Koster; Kelly Markus; Laura Van Der Kamp; Netherlands
Omnium	Laura Trott-Kenny; United Kingdom	Isabella King; Australia	Coryn Rivera; United States

== Medal table ==
* Host nation (Italy)

Rank	Nation	Gold	Silver	Bronze	Total
1	Australia (AUS)	7	4	4	15
2	Russia (RUS)	3	2	3	8
3	Great Britain (GBR)	2	5	0	7
4	France (FRA)	2	3	1	6
5	Denmark (DEN)	2	0	0	2
5	South Korea (KOR)	2	0	0	2
7	South Africa (SAF)	1	0	0	1
8	New Zealand (NZL)	0	2	0	2
9	Germany (GER)	0	1	3	4
10	Spain (SPA)	0	1	1	2
11	Argentina (ARG)	0	1	0	1
12	Italy (ITA)*	0	0	2	2
12	Netherlands (NED)	0	0	2	2
12	United States (USA)	0	0	2	2
15	Cuba (CUB)	0	0	1	1
Totals (15 entries)		19	19	19	57
