= 1990 World Juniors Track Cycling Championships =

- Venue: Middlesbrough, United Kingdom
- Date: August 1990

The 1990 World Juniors Track Cycling Championships were the 16th annual Junior World Championships for track cycling held in Middlesbrough, United Kingdom in August 1990.

The Championships had five events for men (sprint, points race, individual pursuit, team pursuit and 1 kilometre time trial) and three for women (sprint, individual pursuit and points race).

== Events ==
Event	Gold	Silver	Bronze
Men's Events
Sprint	Ainārs Ķiksis; Latvia	Pavel Buráň; Czech Republic	Roberto Chiappa; Italy
Points race	Alexander Zaitsev; Soviet Union	Léon van Bon; Netherlands	Holger Schardt; West Germany
Individual pursuit	Vasyl Yakovlev; Ukraine	Tom O'Shannessey; Australia	Konstantin Gorbatchev; Soviet Union
Team pursuit	Alexandre Erochenko; Oleg Bakhmetiev; Vladimir Krivinose; Serguei Golovko; Soviet Union	Mark Kreuscher; Oliver Carl; Sven Landwehrkamp; Olaf Pollack; East Germany	Stuart O'Grady; Damian McDonald; Matthew Gilmore; Tom O'Shannessey; Australia
Time trial	Alexandr Khromikh; Russia	Maciej Sztykiel; Poland	Shane Kelly; Australia

Event	Gold	Silver	Bronze
Women's Events
Sprint	Katrin Freitag; East Germany	Juliette Raetsch; East Germany	Tatiana Balmasova; Soviet Union
Individual pursuit	Elena Tchalykh; Russia	Jessica Grieco; United States	Zulfiya Zabirova; Soviet Union
Points race	Ina-Yoko Teutenberg; Germany	Jessica Grieco; United States	Elena Tchalykh; Russia

== Medal table ==
* Host nation (United Kingdom)

Rank	Nation	Gold	Silver	Bronze	Total
1	Soviet Union (URS)	6	0	4	10
2	East Germany (DDR)	1	2	0	3
3	Germany (GER)	1	0	0	1
4	United States (USA)	0	2	0	2
5	Australia (AUS)	0	1	2	3
6	Czechoslovakia (CSK)	0	1	0	1
6	Netherlands (NED)	0	1	0	1
6	Poland (POL)	0	1	0	1
9	Italy (ITA)	0	0	1	1
9	West Germany (FRG)	0	0	1	1
Totals (10 entries)		8	8	8	24
