= 2002 UCI Juniors Track World Championships =

- Venue: Melbourne, Australia
- Date: 21–25 August 2002

The 2002 UCI Juniors Track World Championships were the 28th annual Junior World Championships for track cycling held at Melbourne, in Australia, from 21 to 25 August 2002.

The Championships had nine events for men (sprint, points race, individual pursuit, team pursuit, 1 kilometre time trial, team sprint, keirin, madison and scratch race) and six for women (sprint, individual pursuit, 500 metre time trial, points race, keirin, scratch race).

== Events ==
Event	Gold	Silver	Bronze
Men's Events
Sprint	Mark French; Australia	Michael Seidenbecher; Germany	François Pervis; France
Points race	Mikhail Ignatiev; Russia	Vitaliy Kondrut; Ukraine	Gideon De Jong; Netherlands
Individual pursuit	Mark Jamieson; Australia	Mikhail Ignatiev; Russia	Serguei Ulakov; Russia
Team pursuit	Mikhail Ignatiev; Alexander Khatuntsev; Iliya Krestianinov; Serguei Ulakov; Russia	Mark Jamieson; Sean Finning; Nicholas Sanderson; Christopher Sutton; Australia	Lubor Kosicka; Petr Lechner; Richard Ondryas; David Studnicka; Czech Republic
Time trial	Wade Cosgrove; Australia	François Pervis; France	Ahmed Lopez Naranjo; Cuba
Team sprint	François Pervis; Mickaël Murat; Grégory Baugé; France	Michael Spiess; Michael Seidenbecher; Dominik Krones; Germany	Filip Ditzel; Jaroslav Flendr; Daniel Lebl; Czech Republic
Keirin	Mark French; Australia	Andrew Lakatosh; United States	Alexey Hamachev; Russia
Madison	Tom Thiblier; Mathieu Ladagnous; France	Christopher Sutton; Jonny Clarke; Australia	Sebastian Frey; Florian Piper; Germany
Scratch race	Wim Stroetinga; Netherlands	Sebastian Frey; Germany	Alex Rasmussen; Denmark

Event	Gold	Silver	Bronze
Women's Events
Sprint	Elisa Frisoni; Italy	Ekaterina Merzlikina; Russia	Jennifer Strohschneider; Germany
Individual pursuit	Alexis Rhodes; Australia	Julia Kurtzke; Germany	Miranda Vierling; Netherlands
Time trial	Elisa Frisoni; Italy	Emilie Jeannot; France	Jennifer Strohschneider; Germany
Points race	Miranda Vierling; Netherlands	Sung Eun Gu; South Korea	Fu Shimei; China
Keirin	Elisa Frisoni; Italy	Shi Wenya; China	Anastasia Chulkova; Russia
Scratch race	Ekaterina Merzlikina; Russia	Sung Eun Go; South Korea	Belinda Goss; Australia

== Medal table ==
* Host nation (Australia)

Rank	Nation	Gold	Silver	Bronze	Total
1	Australia (AUS)*	5	2	1	8
2	Russia (RUS)	3	2	3	8
3	Italy (ITA)	3	0	0	3
4	France (FRA)	2	2	1	5
5	Netherlands (NED)	2	0	2	4
6	Germany (GER)	0	4	3	7
7	South Korea (KOR)	0	2	0	2
8	China (CHN)	0	1	1	2
9	Ukraine (UKR)	0	1	0	1
9	United States (USA)	0	1	0	1
11	Czech Republic (CZE)	0	0	2	2
12	Cuba (CUB)	0	0	1	1
12	Denmark (DEN)	0	0	1	1
Totals (13 entries)		15	15	15	45
