= 2001 UCI Juniors Track World Championships =

- Venue: Trexlertown, United States
- Date: 25–29 July 2001

The 2001 UCI Juniors Track World Championships were the 27th annual Junior World Championships for track cycling, held at Trexlertown, United States, from 25 to 29 July.

The Championships had six events for men (sprint, points race, individual pursuit, team pursuit, 1 kilometre time trial and team sprint) and four for women (sprint, individual pursuit, 500 metre time trial and points race).

== Events ==
Event	Gold	Silver	Bronze
Men's Events
Sprint	Mark French; Australia	Robert Gerhardt; Germany	Mathieu Mandard; France
Points race	Nikita Eskov; Russia	Jos Pronk; Netherlands	Aaron Kemps; Australia
Individual pursuit	Christoph Meschenmoser; Germany	Volodymyr Dyudya; Ukraine	Sven Krauß; Germany
Team pursuit	Kevin Gouellain; Sebastien Greau; Aurelien Mingot; Fabien Sanchez; France	Robert Bengsch; Henning Bommel; Karl-Christian Konig; Christoph Meschenmoser; Germany	Alexei Chmidt; Ilya Krestyaninov; Roman Paramonov; Alexei Tchounossov; Russia
Time trial	Theo Bos; Netherlands	Mathieu Mandard; France	Christian Stahl; United States
Team sprint	Mark French; Jason Niblett; Kial Stewart; Australia	Mickaël Murat; Mathieu Mandard; François Pervis; France	Robert Gerhardt; Michael Seidenbecher; Sascha Härtelt; Germany

Event	Gold	Silver	Bronze
Women's Events
Sprint	Sarah Uhl; United States	Christin Muche; Germany	Valentina Alessio; Italy
Individual pursuit	Vera Koedooder; Netherlands	Sarah Hammer; United States	Charlotte Becker; Germany
Time trial	Anna Meares; Australia	Christin Muche; Germany	Clara Sanchez; France
Points race	Giorgia Bronzini; Italy	Diana Elemetaite; Lithuania	Natalia Boyarskaya; Russia

== Medal table ==
* Host nation (United States)

Rank	Nation	Gold	Silver	Bronze	Total
1	Australia (AUS)	3	0	1	4
2	Netherlands (NED)	2	1	0	3
3	Germany (GER)	1	4	3	8
4	France (FRA)	1	2	2	5
5	United States (USA)*	1	1	1	3
6	Russia (RUS)	1	0	2	3
7	Italy (ITA)	1	0	1	2
8	Lithuania (LTU)	0	1	0	1
8	Ukraine (UKR)	0	1	0	1
Totals (9 entries)		10	10	10	30
