= 1985 World Juniors Track Cycling Championships =

- Venue: Stuttgart, Germany
- Date: August 1985

The 1985 World Juniors Track Cycling Championships were the 11th annual Junior World Championships for track cycling held in Stuttgart, West Germany in August 1985.

The Championships had five events for men only: Sprint, Points race, Individual pursuit, Team pursuit and 1 kilometre time trial.

== Events ==
| Event | Gold | Silver | Bronze |
|---|---|---|---|
Men's Events
| Sprint | Oleg Borzunov; Soviet Union | Heiko Rosen; East Germany | Kuraok Shintaro; Japan |
| Points race | Robert Waller; Australia | Peter Naessens; Belgium | Louis De Koning; Netherlands |
| Individual pursuit | Artūras Kasputis; Lithuania | Robert Waller; Australia | Gary Anderson; New Zealand |
| Team pursuit | Thomas Liese; Steffen Blochwitz; Uwe Preißler; Michael Bock; East Germany | Fabio Ragazzi; Angelo Denti; Fabio Baldato; Italy | Aleksandr Klaus; Artūras Kasputis; Aleksandr Tolkatchev; Anatoly Veselov; Soviet Union |
| Time trial | Silvio Boarin; Italy | Robert Lechner; Germany | Johnny Franck; Denmark |

== Medal table ==
* Host nation (Germany)

| Rank | Nation | Gold | Silver | Bronze | Total |
|---|---|---|---|---|---|
| 1 | Soviet Union (URS) | 2 | 0 | 1 | 3 |
| 2 | Australia (AUS) | 1 | 1 | 0 | 2 |
| 2 | East Germany (DDR) | 1 | 1 | 0 | 2 |
| 2 | Italy (ITA) | 1 | 1 | 0 | 2 |
| 5 | Belgium (BEL) | 0 | 1 | 0 | 1 |
| 5 | Germany (GER)* | 0 | 1 | 0 | 1 |
| 7 | Denmark (DEN) | 0 | 0 | 1 | 1 |
| 7 | Japan (JPN) | 0 | 0 | 1 | 1 |
| 7 | Netherlands (NED) | 0 | 0 | 1 | 1 |
| 7 | New Zealand (NZL) | 0 | 0 | 1 | 1 |
| Totals (10 entries) | | 5 | 5 | 5 | 15 |
