= UCI Junior Track Cycling World Championships =

- Status: active
- Genre: sports event
- Date: midyear
- Frequency: annual
- Inaugurated: 1975
- Most recent: 2026
- Organiser: UCI

The UCI Junior Track Cycling World Championships (named the World Juniors Track Cycling Championships from its inauguration in 1975 until 2000 and UCI Juniors Track World Championships from 2001 until 2015) are a set of world championship events for junior riders, for various disciplines and distances in track cycling and are regulated by the Union Cycliste Internationale (UCI). In the period 2005–2009 the championships were part of the UCI Junior World Championships.

The championships commenced in 1975 with four events for men only: sprint, points race, individual pursuit and team pursuit. In 1977, the time trial was added. In 1987, the first two events were introduced for women: sprint and individual pursuit. In 1989 and 1990, the points race was added to the women's schedule, but was then dropped in 1991. In 1998, the team sprint was added for men, and the time trial (500 m compared to the men's 1000 m) and points race were added for women. In 2002, the keirin, madison and scratch race were added for men, and the keirin and scratch race for women. In 2007, the omnium was added for men, and the team sprint was introduced for women. In 2008, the team pursuit was added for women. In 2009, the omnium was added for women. In 2016, the madison was introduced as a demonstration event for women. The following year, parity was achieved between men and women when the madison became an official women's event. There were now ten events each for men and women. In 2021, the elimination race was introduced for both men and women. In 2025, further parity was gained when the women's time trial became the same length (1000 m) as the men's.

The UCI awards a gold medal and a rainbow jersey to the winner and silver and bronze medals to the second and third place-getters. World champions wear their rainbow jerseys until the following year's championship, but they may wear it only in the type of event in which they won it. Former champions can wear rainbow cuffs on their everyday jerseys. World track championships are allocated to different countries each year. They are run by that country's national cycling association, although the judges are provided by the UCI.

== Summary ==
Edition	Year	Host country	Host City	Events
World Juniors Track Cycling Championships
1	1975	Switzerland	Lausanne	4
2	1976	Belgium	Liège	4
3	1977	Austria	Vienna	5
4	1978	United States	Washington, D.C.	5
5	1979	Argentina	Buenos Aires	5
6	1980	Mexico	Mexico City	5
7	1981	East Germany	Leipzig	5
8	1982	Italy	Marsciano	5
9	1983	New Zealand	Whanganui	5
10	1984	France	Beuvron	5
11	1985	West Germany	Stuttgart	5
12	1986	Morocco	Casablanca	5
13	1987	Italy	Dalmine	7
14	1988	Denmark	Odense	7
15	1989	Soviet Union	Moscow	8
16	1990	United Kingdom	Middlesbrough	8
17	1991	United States	Colorado Springs	7
18	1992	Greece	Athens	7
19	1993	Australia	Perth	7
20	1994	Ecuador	Quito	7
21	1995	San Marino	Forlì	7
22	1996	Slovenia	Novo Mesto	7
23	1997	South Africa	Cape Town	7
24	1998	Cuba	Havana	10
25	1999	Greece	Athens	10
26	2000	Italy	Fiorenzuola d'Arda	10
UCI Juniors Track World Championships
27	2001	United States	Trexlertown	10
28	2002	Australia	Melbourne	15
29	2003	Russia	Moscow	15
30	2004	United States	Los Angeles	15
31	2005	Austria	Vienna	15
32	2006	Belgium	Ghent	15
33	2007	Mexico	Aguascalientes	17
34	2008	South Africa	Cape Town	18
35	2009	Russia	Moscow	19
36	2010	Italy	Montichiari	19
37	2011	Russia	Moscow	19
38	2012	New Zealand	Invercargill	19
39	2013	United Kingdom	Glasgow	19
40	2014	South Korea	Gwangmyeong	19
41	2015	Kazakhstan	Astana	19
UCI Junior Track Cycling World Championships
42	2016	Switzerland	Aigle	19
43	2017	Italy	Montichiari	20
44	2018	Switzerland	Aigle	20
45	2019	Germany	Frankfurt (Oder)	20
46	2021	Egypt	Cairo	22
47	2022	Israel	Tel Aviv	22
48	2023	Colombia	Cali	22
49	2024	China	Luoyang	22
50	2025	Netherlands	Apeldoorn	22
51	2026	Belgium	Heusden-Zolder	22

== See also ==
- UCI Junior World Championships
- UCI Track Cycling World Ranking
- UCI Track Cycling World Cup
- UCI Track Cycling World Championships
- UCI Para-cycling Track World Championships
- UCI Cycling World Championships
