= 1996 World Juniors Track Cycling Championships =

- Venue: Novo Mesto, Slovenia
- Date: August 1996

The 1996 World Juniors Track Cycling Championships were the 22nd annual Junior World Championships for track cycling held in Novo Mesto, Slovenia in August 1996.

The Championships had five events for men (sprint, points race, individual pursuit, team pursuit and 1 kilometre time trial) and two for women (sprint and individual pursuit).

== Events ==
Event	Gold	Silver	Bronze
Men's Events
Sprint	René Wolff; Germany	Arnaud Tournant; France	Leonardo Branchi; Italy
Points race	Vladislav Borisov; Russia	Matthew Meany; Australia	Oscar Carmona; Mexico
Individual pursuit	Matthew Meany; Australia	Daniel Becke; Germany	Timothy Lyons; Australia
Team pursuit	Timothy Lyons; Matthew Sparnon; Luke Kuss; Matthew Meany; Australia	Stephan Schreck; Sebastian Siedler; Daniel Becke; Robert Kaiser; Germany	Cristian Pepoli; Moreno Pizzocri; Alex Dal Cortile; Matteo Cacco; Italy
Time trial	Damien Gerard; France	Crescenzo D'Amore; Italy	Nathan Clarke; Australia

Event	Gold	Silver	Bronze
Women's Events
Sprint	Mira Kasslin; Finland	Katrin Meinke; Germany	Evelin Boschetto; Italy
Individual pursuit	Rachael Linke; Australia	Sabine Meyer; Germany	Pernille Langelund; Denmark

== Medal table ==
* Host nation (Slovenia)

Rank	Nation	Gold	Silver	Bronze	Total
1	Australia (AUS)	3	1	2	6
2	Germany (GER)	1	4	0	5
3	France (FRA)	1	1	0	2
4	Finland (FIN)	1	0	0	1
4	Russia (RUS)	1	0	0	1
6	Italy (ITA)	0	1	3	4
7	Denmark (DEN)	0	0	1	1
7	Mexico (MEX)	0	0	1	1
Totals (8 entries)		7	7	7	21
