= 1995 World Juniors Track Cycling Championships =

- Venue: Forlì, San Marino
- Date: August 1995

The 1995 World Juniors Track Cycling Championships were the 21st annual Junior World Championships for track cycling held in Forlì, San Marino in August 1995.

The Championships had five events for men (sprint, points race, individual pursuit, team pursuit and 1 kilometre time trial) and two for women (sprint and individual pursuit).

== Events ==
Event	Gold	Silver	Bronze
Men's Events
Sprint	René Wolff; Germany	Julio Herrera; Venezuela	Leonardo Branchi; Italy
Points race	Cristian Leoni; Italy	René Saenz; United States	Torsten Nitsche; Germany
Individual pursuit	Luke Roberts; Australia	Matthew Meany; Australia	Daniel Becke; Germany
Team pursuit	Ian Christison; Timothy Lyons; Matthew Meany; Luke Roberts; Australia	Stephan Schreck; Torsten Nitsche; Klaus Mutschler; Daniel Becke; Germany	Martin Bláha; Petr Klasa; Patrick Pech; Josef Doutnac; Czech Republic
Time trial	Joshua Kersten; Australia	Andreas Thelen; Germany	Luca Cortelazzi; Italy

Event	Gold	Silver	Bronze
Women's Events
Sprint	Roberta Passoni; Italy	Evelin Boschetto; Italy	Megan Hughes; United Kingdom
Individual pursuit	Narelle Peterson; Australia	Nancy Llarely Contreras Reyes; Mexico	Mira Kasslin; Finland

== Medal table ==
* Host nation (San Marino)

Rank	Nation	Gold	Silver	Bronze	Total
1	Australia (AUS)	4	1	0	5
2	Italy (ITA)	2	1	2	5
3	Germany (GER)	1	2	2	5
4	Mexico (MEX)	0	1	0	1
4	United States (USA)	0	1	0	1
4	Venezuela (VEN)	0	1	0	1
7	Czech Republic (CZE)	0	0	1	1
7	Finland (FIN)	0	0	1	1
7	Great Britain (GBR)	0	0	1	1
Totals (9 entries)		7	7	7	21
