= 1981 World Juniors Track Cycling Championships =

- Venue: Leipzig, West Germany
- Date: August 1981

The 1981 World Juniors Track Cycling Championships were the seventh annual Junior World Championships for track cycling held in Grimma, Leipzig, West Germany in August 1981.

The Championships had five events for men only, Sprint, Points race, Individual pursuit, Team pursuit and 1 kilometre time trial.

== Events ==
Event	Gold	Silver	Bronze
Men's Events
Sprint	Olaf Arndt; East Germany	P. Rampazzo; Italy	Bruno Bannes; France
Points race	Fabio Lana; Italy	Mat Lange; West Germany	Kenneth Bering; Denmark
Individual pursuit	Reinhard Alber; West Germany	Marat Ganeyev; Soviet Union	Martin Palis; Soviet Union
Team pursuit	Dainis Grantinch; Martin Palis; Marat Ganeyev; Yuri Kasakov; Soviet Union	Frank Siggelkowe; Carsten Wolf; Steven Planitzer; Thomas Raddatz; East Germany	Pascal Carrara; Bruno Wojtinek; Christian Noiret; Dominique Lecrocq; France
Time trial	Marcelo Alexandre; Argentina	Dirk Streicher; East Germany	Stefano Baudino; Italy

== Medal table ==
* Host nation (West Germany)

Rank	Nation	Gold	Silver	Bronze	Total
1	East Germany (GDR)	1	2	0	3
2	Italy (ITA)	1	1	1	3
2	Soviet Union (URS)	1	1	1	3
4	West Germany (FRG)*	1	1	0	2
5	Argentina (ARG)	1	0	0	1
6	France (FRA)	0	0	2	2
7	Denmark (DEN)	0	0	1	1
Totals (7 entries)		5	5	5	15
