= 1997 World Juniors Track Cycling Championships =

- Venue: Cape Town, South Africa
- Date: August 1997

The 1997 World Juniors Track Cycling Championships were the 23rd annual Junior World Championships for track cycling held at the Bellville Velodrome in Cape Town, South Africa in August 1997.

The Championships had five events for men (sprint, points race, individual pursuit, team pursuit and 1 kilometre time trial) and two for women (sprint and individual pursuit).

== Events ==
Event	Gold	Silver	Bronze
Men's Events
Sprint	Tim Zuhlke; Germany	Kane Selin; Australia	Andrea Garavelli; Italy
Points race	Michael Rogers; Australia	Libor Hlaváč; Czech Republic	Morten Voss Christensen; Denmark
Individual pursuit	Marco Hesselschwerdt; Germany	Michael Rogers; Australia	Christian Bach; Germany
Team pursuit	Graeme Brown; Scott Davis; Brett Lancaster; Michael Rogers; Australia	Robert Kaiser; Marco Kesselschwerdt; Eric Baumann; Christian Bach; Germany	Manuel Quinziato; Ivan Ravaioli; Luca Barazzutti; Francesco Colavito; Italy
Time trial	Jeffrey Hopkins; Australia	Tim Zuhlke; Germany	Alberto Loddo; Italy

Event	Gold	Silver	Bronze
Women's Events
Sprint	Katrin Meinke; Germany	Yumari González Valdivieso; Cuba	Rosealee Hubbard; Australia
Individual pursuit	Alayna Burns; Australia	Gitana Gruodyte; Lithuania	Monika Tyburska; Poland

== Medal table ==
* Host nation (South Africa)

Rank	Nation	Gold	Silver	Bronze	Total
1	Australia (AUS)	4	2	1	7
2	Germany (GER)	3	2	1	6
3	Cuba (CUB)	0	1	0	1
3	Czech Republic (CZE)	0	1	0	1
3	Lithuania (LTU)	0	1	0	1
6	Italy (ITA)	0	0	3	3
7	Denmark (DEN)	0	0	1	1
7	Poland (POL)	0	0	1	1
Totals (8 entries)		7	7	7	21
