= 2007 UCI Juniors Track World Championships =

- Venue: Aguascalientes, Mexico
- Date: 4–7 August 2007

The 2007 UCI Juniors Track World Championships were the 33rd annual Junior World Championships for track cycling held at Aguascalientes, in Mexico, from 4 to 7 August.

The Championships had ten events for men (sprint, points race, individual pursuit, team pursuit, 1 kilometre time trial, team sprint, keirin, madison, scratch race and omnium) and seven for women (sprint, individual pursuit, 500 metre time trial, points race, keirin, scratch race, team sprint).

== Events ==
Event	Gold	Silver	Bronze
Men's Events
Sprint	Thierry Jollet; France	Christian Lyte; United Kingdom	Peter Mitchell; United Kingdom
Points race	Nikita Novikov; Russia	Bouke Kuiper; Netherlands	Jason Christie; New Zealand
Individual pursuit	Travis Meyer; Australia	Evgeny Kovalev; Russia	Leigh Howard; Australia
Team pursuit	Jack Bobridge; Leigh Howard; Travis Meyer; Glenn O'Shea; Australia	Kirill Baranov; Evgeny Kovalev; Nikita Novikov; Alexander Petrovskiy; Russia	Elia Viviani; Paolo Locatelli; Giacomo Nizzolo; Luca Pirini; Fabio Felline; Italy
Time trial	Thomas Palmer; Australia	Eddie Dawkins; New Zealand	Daniel Rackwitz; Germany
Team sprint	David Daniell; Christian Lyte; Peter Mitchell; United Kingdom	Charlie Conord; Thierry Jollet; Quentin Lafargue; France	Byron Davis; Jason Holloway; Thomas Palmer; Australia
Keirin	Christian Lyte; United Kingdom	David Daniell; United Kingdom	Matteo Pelucchi; Italy
Madison	Evgeny Kovalev; Alexander Petrovskiy; Russia	Leigh Howard; Glenn O'Shea; Australia	Edwin Ávila; Jaime Ramirez Bernal; Colombia
Scratch race	Travis Meyer; Australia	Piotr Kasperkiewicz; Poland	Ángel Pulgar; Venezuela
Omnium	Glenn O'Shea; Australia	Myron Simpson; New Zealand	Maurice Calles; Germany

Event	Gold	Silver	Bronze
Women's Events
Sprint	Kristina Vogel; Germany	Jessica Varnish; United Kingdom	Charlene Delev; Germany
Individual pursuit	Josie Tomic; Australia	Sarah Kent; Australia	Lauren Ellis; New Zealand
Time trial	Kristina Vogel; Germany	Huang Ting-ying; Taiwan	Sabine Brettschneider; Germany
Points race	Josie Tomic; Australia	Jenny Rios; Mexico	Iraida Garcia; Cuba
Keirin	Victoria Baranova; Russia	Josephine Butler; Australia	Monique Sullivan; Canada
Scratch race	Iraida Garcia; Cuba	Barbara Guarischi; Italy	Anna Mosbach; Germany
Team sprint	Kristina Vogel; Sabine Brettschneider; Germany	Shu Ping Lin; Huang Ting-ying; Taiwan	Victoria Baranova; Elena Melnichenko; Russia

== Medal table ==
* Host nation (Mexico)

Rank	Nation	Gold	Silver	Bronze	Total
1	Australia (AUS)	7	3	2	12
2	Russia (RUS)	3	2	1	6
3	Germany (GER)	3	0	5	8
4	Great Britain (GBR)	2	3	1	6
5	France (FRA)	1	1	0	2
6	Cuba (CUB)	1	0	1	2
7	New Zealand (NZL)	0	2	2	4
8	Taiwan (TWN)	0	2	0	2
9	Italy (ITA)	0	1	2	3
10	Mexico (MEX)*	0	1	0	1
10	Netherlands (NED)	0	1	0	1
10	Poland (POL)	0	1	0	1
13	Canada (CAN)	0	0	1	1
13	Colombia (COL)	0	0	1	1
13	Venezuela (VEN)	0	0	1	1
Totals (15 entries)		17	17	17	51
