= 1993 World Juniors Track Cycling Championships =

- Venue: Perth, Australia
- Date: August 1993

The 1993 World Juniors Track Cycling Championships were the 19th annual Junior World Championships for track cycling held in Perth, Australia in August 1993.

The Championships had five events for men (sprint, points race, individual pursuit, team pursuit and 1 kilometre time trial) and two for women (sprint and individual pursuit).

== Events ==
Event	Gold	Silver	Bronze
Men's Events
Sprint	Michael Scheurer; Germany	Irek Wlock; Australia	Darren Harry; Australia
Points race	Thorsten Rund; Germany	Mauro Trentini; Italy	Bradley McGee; Australia
Individual pursuit	Bradley McGee; Australia	Cristian Bianchini; Italy	Thorsten Rund; Germany
Team pursuit	Ronny Lauke; Dirk Rollenenfitsch; Thorsten Rund; Holger Roth; Germany	Ondřej Sosenka; Josef Zabka; Jakub Sara; Pavel Boudny; Czechoslovakia	Eamonn Gilbert; Lee Vertongen; Julian Dean; Brent Johnson; New Zealand
Time trial	Michael Scheurer; Germany	Alberto Ben Guerrero; Spain	Sébastien Morelon; France

Event	Gold	Silver	Bronze
Women's Events
Sprint	Ina Heinemann; Germany	Michelle Ferris; Australia	Natallia Tsylinskaya; Belarus
Individual pursuit	Maria Jongeling; Netherlands	Sarah Ulmer; New Zealand	Anke Wichmann; Germany

== Medal table ==
* Host nation (Australia)

Rank	Nation	Gold	Silver	Bronze	Total
1	Germany (GER)	5	0	2	7
2	Australia (AUS)*	1	2	2	5
3	Netherlands (NED)	1	0	0	1
4	Italy (ITA)	0	2	0	2
5	New Zealand (NZL)	0	1	1	2
6	Czechoslovakia (CSK)	0	1	0	1
6	Spain (ESP)	0	1	0	1
8	Belarus (BLR)	0	0	1	1
8	France (FRA)	0	0	1	1
Totals (9 entries)		7	7	7	21
