= 2006 UCI Juniors Track World Championships =

- Venue: Ghent, Belgium
- Date: 5–8 August 2006

The 2006 UCI Juniors Track World Championships were the 32nd annual Junior World Championships for track cycling held at Ghent, in Belgium, from 5 to 8 August.

The Championships had nine events for men (sprint, points race, individual pursuit, team pursuit, 1 kilometre time trial, team sprint, keirin, madison and scratch race) and six for women (sprint, individual pursuit, 500 metre time trial, points race, keirin, scratch race).

== Events ==
Event	Gold	Silver	Bronze
Men's Events
Sprint	Jason Kenny; United Kingdom	Scott Sunderland; Australia	Daniel Ellis; Australia
Points race	Oleksandr Martynenko; Ukraine	Jonathan Bellis; United Kingdom	Travis Meyer; Australia
Individual pursuit	Cameron Meyer; Australia	Westley Gough; New Zealand	Jesse Sergent; New Zealand
Team pursuit	Jack Bobridge; Leigh Howard; Cameron Meyer; Travis Meyer; Australia	Shane Archbold; Westley Gough; Shem Rodger; Jesse Sergent; New Zealand	Jonathan Bellis; Steven Burke; Alex Dowsett; Peter Kennaugh; United Kingdom
Time trial	Scott Sunderland; Australia	Christian Lyte; United Kingdom	David Daniell; United Kingdom
Team sprint	Christian Lyte; Jason Kenny; David Daniell; United Kingdom	Joel Davis; Daniel Ellis; Scott Sunderland; Australia	Zafeiris Volikakis; Christos Volikakis; Alexandros Floros; Greece
Keirin	Jason Kenny; United Kingdom	Ghislain Boiron; France	Nicolas Bourin; France
Madison	Cameron Meyer; Travis Meyer; Australia	Pim Ligthart; Jeff Vermeulen; Netherlands	Fabrizio Braggion; Elia Viviani; Italy
Scratch race	Peter Kennaugh; United Kingdom	Morgan Lamoisson; France	Vasileros Galanis; Greece

Event	Gold	Silver	Bronze
Women's Events
Sprint	Lyubov Basova; Ukraine	Anna Blyth; United Kingdom	Sandie Clair; France
Individual pursuit	Lesya Kalytovska; Ukraine	Lauren Ellis; New Zealand	Peta Mullens; Australia
Time trial	Sandie Clair; France	Lyubov Basova; Ukraine	Kaarle McCulloch; Australia
Points race	Mie Lacota; Denmark	Elikse Van Hage; Netherlands	Evgenia Romanyuta; Russia
Keirin	Anna Blyth; United Kingdom	Anastasia Rozhkova; Russia	Charlene Delev; Germany
Scratch race	Elise van Hage; Netherlands	Evgenia Romanyuta; Russia	Tess Downing; Australia

== Medal table ==
* Host nation (Belgium)

Rank	Nation	Gold	Silver	Bronze	Total
1	Great Britain (GBR)	5	3	2	10
2	Australia (AUS)	4	2	5	11
3	Ukraine (UKR)	3	1	0	4
4	France (FRA)	1	2	2	5
5	Netherlands (NED)	1	2	0	3
6	Denmark (DEN)	1	0	0	1
7	New Zealand (NZL)	0	3	1	4
8	Russia (RUS)	0	2	1	3
9	Greece (GRE)	0	0	2	2
10	Germany (GER)	0	0	1	1
10	Italy (ITA)	0	0	1	1
Totals (11 entries)		15	15	15	45
