= 1979 World Juniors Track Cycling Championships =

- Venue: Buenos Aires, Argentina
- Date: August 1979

The 1979 World Juniors Track Cycling Championships were the fifth annual Junior World Championships for track cycling held in Buenos Aires, Argentina in August 1979. It was the second championship to be held outside Europe, the second to be held in the Americas, and the first to be held in the southern hemisphere.

The Championships had five events for men only, Sprint, Points race, Individual pursuit, Team pursuit and 1 kilometre time trial. With two golds and a bronze, Fredy Schmidtke had the most successful single games for a cyclist to date, while future Tour de France legend Greg LeMond won his first major medal for the United States.

== Events ==
Event	Gold	Silver	Bronze
Men's Events
Sprint	Fredy Schmidtke; West Germany	Michel Cortinovis; France	Stefaan De Craene; Belgium
Points race	Teun van Vliet; Netherlands	Nikolay Trusov; Russia	Jean-François Chaurin; France
Individual pursuit	Gaidis Liepiņš; Soviet Union	Greg LeMond; United States	Philippe Chevallier; France
Team pursuit	Gaidis Liepiņš; Dainis Liepiņš; Vladimir Baluk; Yuri Petrov; Soviet Union	Daniel Pandèle; Philippe Chevallier; Jean-François Dury; François Jurain; France	Fredy Schmidtke; Andreas Suckert; Günther Kobek; Gerhard Strittmatter; West Germany
Time trial	Fredy Schmidtke; West Germany	Gadis Lapinch; Soviet Union	Michel Cortinovis; France

== Medal table ==
* Host nation (Argentina)

Rank	Nation	Gold	Silver	Bronze	Total
1	Soviet Union (URS)	2	2	0	4
2	West Germany (FRG)	2	0	1	3
3	Netherlands (NED)	1	0	0	1
4	France (FRA)	0	2	3	5
5	United States (USA)	0	1	0	1
6	Belgium (BEL)	0	0	1	1
Totals (6 entries)		5	5	5	15
