= 1975 World Juniors Track Cycling Championships =

- Venue: Orbe, Switzerland
- Date: August 1975

The 1975 World Juniors Track Cycling Championships were the first annual Junior World Championships for track cycling held in Orbe, Switzerland.

The Championships had four events for men only, Sprint, Points race, Individual pursuit and Team pursuit.

== Events ==
Event	Gold	Silver	Bronze
Men's events
Sprint	Ottavio Dazzan; Italy	G. Scheler; West Germany	Ralf-Guido Kuschy; East Germany
Points race	Henry Rinklin; West Germany	Miog Marinkovic; Yugoslavia	Eddy Torfs; Belgium
Individual pursuit	Robert Dill-Bundi; Switzerland	José Palma; Argentina	Igor Pelipenko; Soviet Union
Team pursuit	Igor Pelipenko; Sergei Blocin; Viatcheslav Kouchtin; Evgeni Jelisarov; Soviet Union	Martin Hertel; Jürgen Lippold; Hans-Joachim Meisch; Gerald Mortag; East Germany	Nazareno Berto; Cesare Cipollini; Giuseppe Frosi; Dante Morandi; Italy

== Medal table ==
* Host nation (Switzerland)

Rank	Nation	Gold	Silver	Bronze	Total
1	West Germany (FRG)	1	1	0	2
2	Italy (ITA)	1	0	1	2
2	Soviet Union (URS)	1	0	1	2
4	Switzerland (SWI)*	1	0	0	1
5	East Germany (GDR)	0	1	1	2
6	Argentina (ARG)	0	1	0	1
6	Yugoslavia (YUG)	0	1	0	1
8	Belgium (BEL)	0	0	1	1
Totals (8 entries)		4	4	4	12
