= List of Swedish records in track cycling =

The following are the national records in track cycling in Sweden, maintained by its national cycling federation, Swedish Cycling Federation (SCF, in Swedish: Svenska Cykelförbundet).

== Men ==
Event	Record	Athlete	Date	Meet	Place	Ref
Flying 200 m time trial						
Flying 500 m time trial						
500 m time trial						
Flying 1 km time trial						
1 km time trial						
Team sprint						
4000 m individual pursuit						
4000 m team pursuit						
Hour record	50.016 km	Gustav Larsson	14 March 2015		Manchester, Great Britain	

== Women ==
Event	Record	Athlete	Date	Meet	Place	Ref
Flying 200 m time trial						
Flying 500 m time trial						
500 m time trial						
Flying 1 km time trial						
1 km time trial						
Team sprint						
3000 m individual pursuit						
3000 m team pursuit						
Hour record						
