= Vasyl Yakovlev =

Ukrainian cyclist

Personal information
- Born: 3 July 1972 (age 54) Odessa, Soviet Union

Cycling career
- Sport: Cycling
Medal record
Men's track cycling
Representing Ukraine
World Championships
Silver medal – second place	1999 Berlin	Points race
Bronze medal – third place	1993 Hamar	Points race
Representing Soviet Union
World Junior Championships
Gold medal – first place	1990 Middlesbrough	Individual pursuit
Silver medal – second place	1989 Moscow	Individual pursuit

Vasyl Yakovlev (born 3 July 1972) is a Ukrainian former cyclist. He competed four Olympic Games.
