= Vitaliy Kondrut =

Ukrainian cyclist

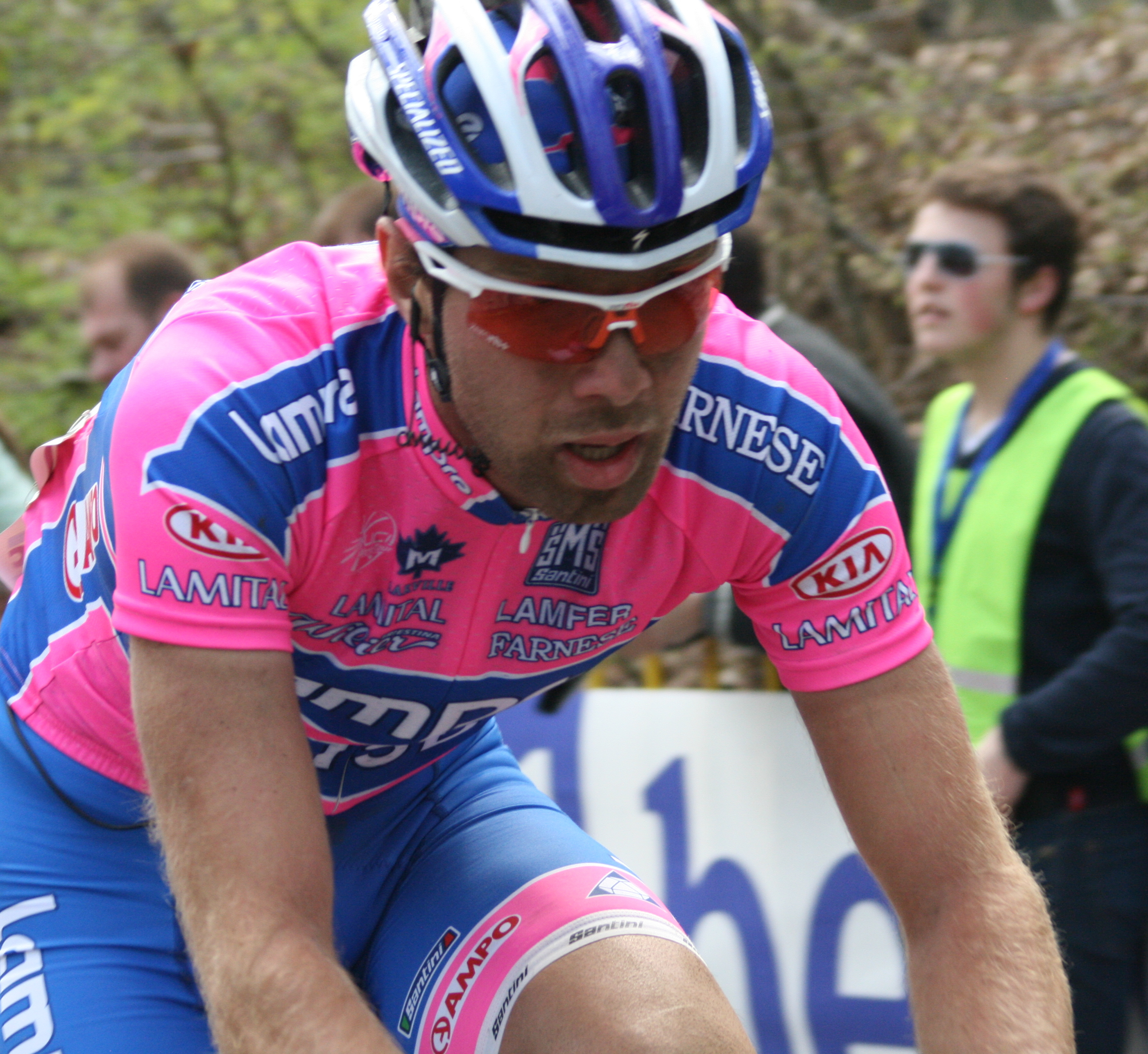
- Kondrut in 2011

Personal information
- Born: 15 February 1984 (age 42) Dzhankoy, Ukraine

Cycling career
- Sport: Cycling
- Current team: Retired
- Discipline: Road
- Role: Rider

Professional teams
- 2007–2008: ISD Sport Donetsk
- 2009–2010: ISD
- 2011: Lampre–ISD
- 2012: Kolss Cycling Team
Medal record
Representing Ukraine
Men's track cycling
World Junior Track Championships
Silver medal – second place	2002 Melbourne	Points race
European Junior Track Championships
Gold medal – first place	2002 Büttgen	Team pursuit
Silver medal – second place	2001 Fiorenzuola	Pursuit
Silver medal – second place	2001 Fiorenzuola	Points race
Bronze medal – third place	2002 Büttgen	Pursuit

Vitaliy Kondrut (born 15 February 1984) is a Ukrainian former cyclist.

== Palmares ==
2006
National U23 Road Race Champion
3rd Gran Premio Industrie del Marmo
2007
2nd Grand Prix of Moscow
3rd Flèche du Sud
2008
1st La Roue Tourangelle
2009
3rd Volta ao Alentejo
