= Volodymyr Dyudya =

Ukrainian cyclist (born 1983)

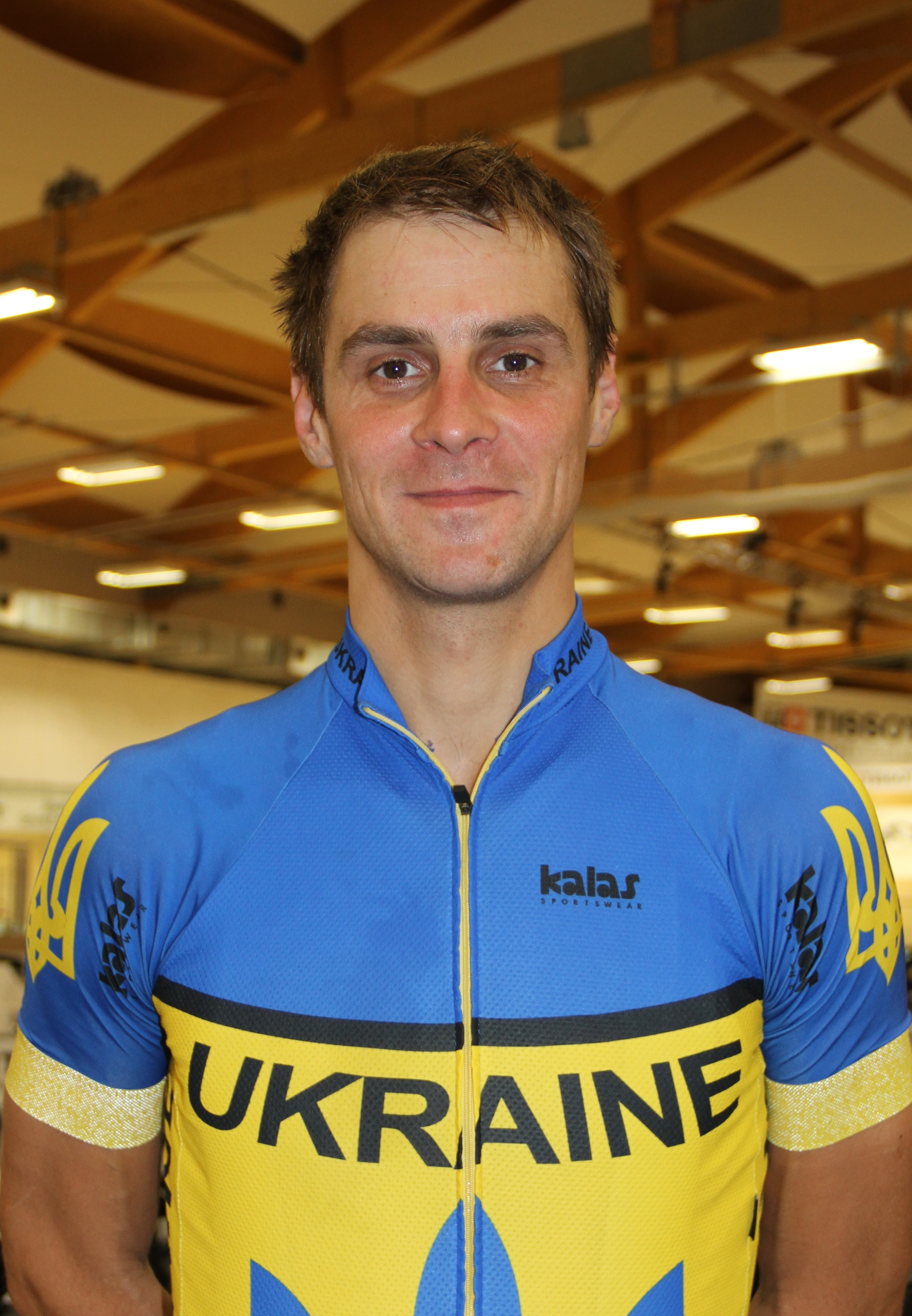
- Dyudya in 2015

Personal information
- Full name: Volodymyr Dyudya
- Born: 6 January 1983 (age 43) Bila Tserkva, Ukrainian SSR, Soviet Union
- Height: 1.90 m (6 ft 3 in)
- Weight: 80 kg (176 lb)

Cycling career
- Sport: Cycling
- Current team: Retired
- Disciplines: Road, track
- Role: Rider

Professional teams
- 2006–2008: Team Milram
- 2009: ISD
- 2014: Gan Su Sports Lottery Cycling Team
- 2015: China Cooperation Development Cycling Team
- 2015: China Continental Team of Gansu Bank
- 2016: Team Lvshan Landscape

Major wins
- National Time Trial Championships (2007)
Medal record
Representing Ukraine
Men's track cycling
World Championships
Bronze medal – third place	2006 Bordeaux	Team pursuit

Volodymyr Yuriyovych Dyudya (Ukrainian: Володимир Юрійович Дюдя; born 6 January 1983) is a Ukrainian former professional racing cyclist, who last rode for Team Lvshan Landscape. He competes on both road and track. He was born in Bila Tserkva.

== Major results ==
=== Track ===
2000
1st Individual pursuit, UCI World Junior Championships
2001
2nd Individual pursuit, UCI World Junior Championships
2002
European Championships

1st Individual pursuit
1st Team pursuit

World Cup Classics

3rd Individual pursuit, Monterrey

2003
European Championships

1st Individual pursuit
1st Team pursuit

World Cup Classics

1st Team pursuit, Cape Town
3rd Individual pursuit, Moscow
3rd Team pursuit, Moscow

2004
1st Individual pursuit, European Championships
2004 World Cup Classics

2nd Individual pursuit, Moscow
2nd Individual pursuit, Sydney
2nd Team pursuit, Moscow

2004–05 World Cup Classics

1st Individual pursuit, Moscow
1st Team pursuit, Moscow
3rd Team pursuit, Los Angeles

2005
European Championships

1st Individual pursuit
2nd Team pursuit

World Cup Classics

2nd Individual pursuit, Manchester

2006
3rd World Team Pursuit Championships
2007
World Cup Classics

1st Individual pursuit, Sydney
2nd Individual pursuit, Beijing

=== Road ===
2001
1st Stage 2 Coupe du Président de la ville de Grudziądz
2006
8th LuK Challenge
2007
1st Time trial, National Road Championships
3rd Eindhoven Team Time Trial (TTT)
2011
2nd Overall Tour de Ribas

1st Prologue

2014
5th Race Horizon Park 1
6th Race Horizon Park 2
6th Race Horizon Park 3
