= Myron Simpson =

New Zealand cyclist (born 1990)

Personal information
- Full name: Myron Simpson
- Born: 30 July 1990 (age 36) Auckland, New Zealand

Cycling career
- Sport: Cycling
- Current team: Team Budget Forklifts
- Disciplines: Track and Road
- Role: Rider

Amateur team
- 2006-08: Subway Pro Cycling

Professional teams
- 2013: Team Differdange-Losch
- 2014-15: Team Budget Forklifts

Major wins
- 1st, Stage 5 Ras Tour – Ireland (2011); 1st, New Zealand Madison National Championships (2010/13)

Myron Simpson (born 30 July 1990 in Auckland) is a semi-professional New Zealand road and track cyclist. Following a successful track cycling career which includes a silver medal in the Omnium at the 2007 UCI Junior Track World Championships in Mexico and a fourth placing in the 1000m time trial at the 2010 Commonwealth Games in Delhi, India, Simpson's focus has switched somewhat to road cycling. In November, 2012 he was signed by Luxembourg-based UCI Continental cycling team Differdange–Losch for the 2013 European summer but was forced to return home early after injuring his shoulder.

Simpson competed with the Australian-based Team Budget Forklifts squad on the road in 2014; he will keep his place in the team for the 2015 season. Simpson was also recently recalled the New Zealand track cycling team, claiming a silver medal at the UCI London World Cup in December, 2014.

== Career highlights ==
2014
2nd, 4km Team Pursuit – UCI London World Cup (Gough, Bulling and Karwowski)
(New Zealand) National Track Championships

3rd, 30km Points race
4th, 4km Individual pursuit

Battle on the Border - NRS Australian Series - Australia

2nd, Stage 4

2013
(New Zealand) National Track Championships

1st, Madison (with Aaron Gate)
3rd, Individual pursuit

3rd, Schengen Grand Prix - Luxembourg

2012
1st, Prologue – PowerNet Tour of Southland – New Zealand
1st, Cambridge Criterium – New Zealand
2nd, Bevel Kermesse – Belgium
3rd, 4km Team Pursuit – UCI Beijing World Cup (Gough, Latham and Karwowski)

2011
1st, Booischot Kermesse – Belgium
1st, Stage 5, Ras Tour – Ireland
1st, Lokeren Kermesse – Belgium
1st, Heffen Kermesse – Belgium
1st, Tour of Murray River – Stage 5 – Australia

2010
(New Zealand) National Track Championships

1st, Madison (with Aaron Gate)
1st, Team sprint
2nd, 1km Time Trial

2nd, Madison – UCI Melbourne World Cup (with Aaron Gate)
4th, 1 km Time Trial – Commonwealth Games Delhi
1st, Schaffen Kermesse – Belgium
10th, Omnium – UCI Elite Track Cycling World Championships – Copenhagen
3rd, Madison – UCI Beijing World Cup (with Tom Scully)
3rd, 4km Team Pursuit – UCI Beijing World Cup (with Shane Archbold, Aaron Gate and Tom Scully)
