= Track stand =

Technique used by bicycle riders

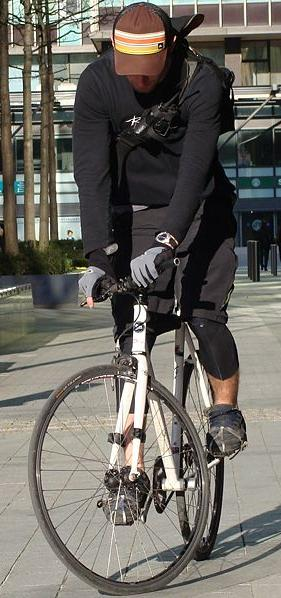
A track stand

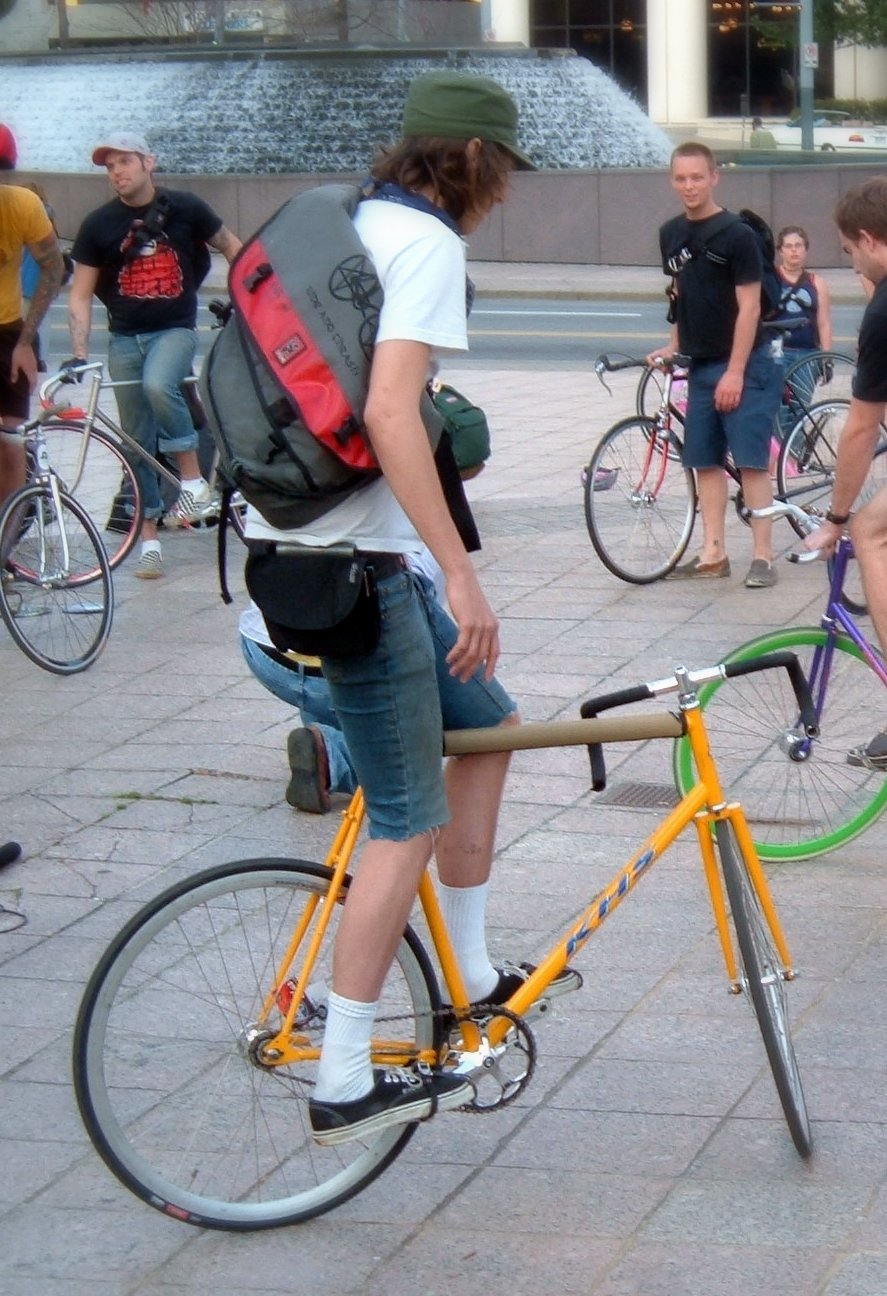
A no-handed track stand

The track stand or standstill is a technique that bicycle riders can use to maintain balance while their bicycle remains stationary or moves only minimal distances. The technique originated in track cycling and is now used by other types of cyclists wishing to stop for a short time without putting a foot on the ground, such as bike commuters at stop signs. To perform a track stand, a cyclist holds the cranks in an approximately horizontal position with the front wheel steered to the left or right, which converts the steered front wheel into a side-to-side motion. In the case of a fixed-gear bicycle, the rider may also alternate between pedaling slightly forward and backward.

== Origin and use ==
The term originated from use of the technique by track cyclists prior to starting, or as a tactic in track sprinting whereby riders will initially ride very slowly and maneuver across the track in an effort to get their rival to take the lead so that they can then draft (or slipstream) behind, conserving energy for the final sprint.

Other types of cyclists also use the technique. Commuters and bike messengers use it while stopped in traffic, especially at red lights, mountain bikers use it in difficult terrain to determine a path and BMX cyclists use it in preparation for tricks.

== Technique ==
A cyclist executing a basic track stand holds the bicycle's cranks in a horizontal position, with their dominant foot forward. Track stands executed on bicycles with a freewheel usually employ a small uphill section of ground. The uphill needs to be sufficient to allow the rider to create backward motion by relaxing pressure on the pedals, thus allowing the bike to roll backwards. Once the track stand is mastered, even a very tiny uphill section is sufficient: e.g. the camber of the road, a raised road marking, and so on. Where no such uphill exists, or even if the gradient is downhill, a track stand can be achieved on a freewheeling bicycle by using a brake to initiate a backwards movement. If a fixed-gear bicycle is being used, an uphill slope is not needed since the rider is able to simply back pedal to move backwards. In both cases forward motion is accomplished by pedalling forwards. The handlebars are held at approximately a 45-degree angle, converting the bike's forward and back motion into side-to-side motion beneath the rider's body. This allows the rider to keep the bike directly below their center of gravity.

Those proficient at the track stand can maintain the position indefinitely. More difficult variations, mostly for show or track stand competitions, involve complications such as putting the non-dominant foot forward, sitting down, or taking one or both hands off the handlebars.

== See also ==
- Bicycle and motorcycle dynamics
