= Dominique Lecrocq =

French cyclist

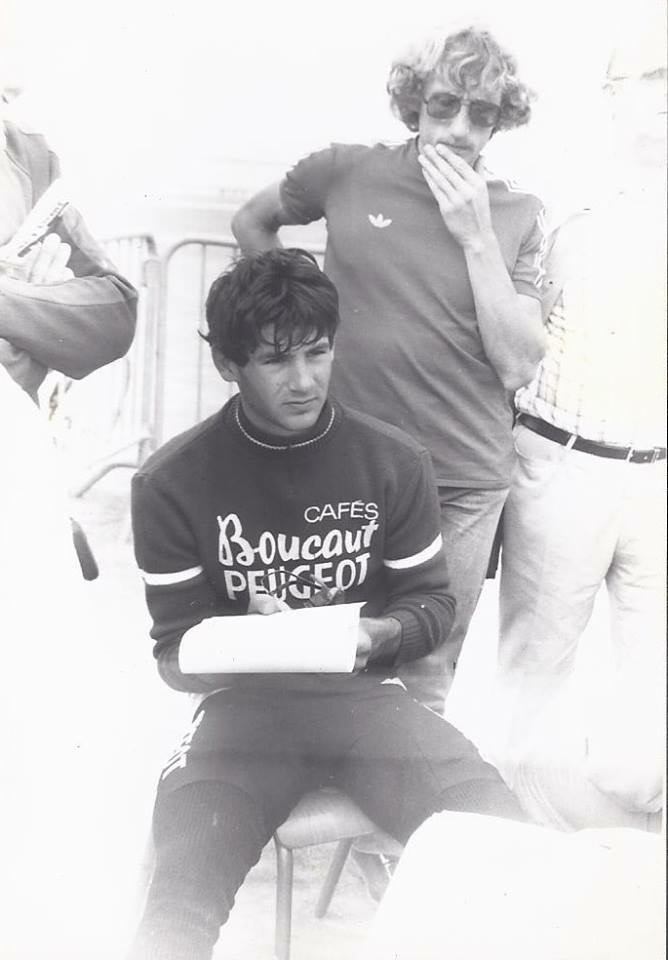

Personal information
- Full name: Dominique Guy Jacques Lecrocq
- Born: 7 July 1963 Reims, France
- Died: 27 April 2014 (aged 50) Annappes, France

Cycling career
- Sport: Cycling
- Current team: Retired
- Disciplines: Road; Track
- Role: Rider

Amateur team
- 1983: VC Roubaix

Professional teams
- 1984–1985: Peugeot–Shell–Michelin
- 1986: Système U
- 1987: Hitachi–Marc

Dominique Lecrocq (7 July 1963 – 27 April 2014) was a French professional racing cyclist. He most notably won Paris–Bourges in 1986 and competed in the 1984 Vuelta a España.

He died of a heart attack on 27 April 2014 at the age of 50.

== Major results ==
=== Road ===
1984
3rd Grand Prix de la Ville de Rennes
1985
1st Prologue Tour d'Armorique
9th Grand Prix d'Isbergues
1986
1st Overall Paris–Bourges

1st Stage 1

1st Grand Prix de Mauléon-Moulins
3rd Grand Prix d'Antibes
4th Overall Vuelta a Murcia
1987
5th Grand Prix de Mauléon-Moulins

=== Track ===
1980
1st Individual pursuit, National Junior Track Championships
1981
1st Team pursuit, National Junior Track Championships
3rd Team pursuit, UCI World Junior Track Championships
1985
1st Points race, National Track Championships
1986
National Track Championships

1st Madison (with Didier Garcia)
2nd Sprint
3rd Points race
