= Megan Hughes =

Welsh cyclist

Personal information
- Full name: Megan Hughes
- Born: 5 January 1977 (age 49)

Cycling career
- Sport: Cycling
- Disciplines: Road and track
- Role: Rider

Amateur team
- 1996: Cwmcarn Paragon

Megan Hughes (married name Megan Bäckstedt, born 5 January 1977) is a Welsh retired track and road racing cyclist. Hughes won the 1998 British National Road Race and represented Wales at the 1998 Commonwealth Games in Kuala Lumpur, Malaysia, competing in the road race and points race where she finished fifth.

== Personal life ==
Megan was educated at Bryn Celynnog Comprehensive School, Beddau. She married the Swedish professional rider, Magnus Bäckstedt, they live in Llanharan near Llantwit Major, Vale of Glamorgan. Despite gaining a place on British Cycling's World Class Performance Plan in 2001, she retired from competitive cycling due to the difficulties involved in living and training in France after her marriage. Her daughters Elynor and Zoë also are racing cyclists.

== Palmarès ==
1995
2nd 500m TT, British National Track Championships
3rd Sprint, World Juniors Track Cycling Championships
1996
1st Stage 6, Tour du Finistère, France
2nd 500m TT, British National Track Championships
1998
1st (United Kingdom) British National Road Race Champs
5th Points race, Commonwealth Games
1999
1st (Wales) Welsh National Road Race Championships

Preceded by Maria Lawrence	(United Kingdom) British National Road Race Champion; 1998	Succeeded by Nicole Cooke
