= Rodney McGee =

Australian cyclist

Personal information
- Born: 11 March 1974 (age 52) Blacktown, Australia

Cycling career
- Sport: Cycling
- Current team: Retired
- Discipline: Track
- Role: Rider
Medal record
Men's track cycling
Representing Australia
UCI Track World Championships
| Gold medal – first place | 1995 Bogota | Team pursuit |
| Bronze medal – third place | 1994 Palermo | Team pursuit |

Rodney John McGee (born 11 March 1974 in Blacktown) is an Australian former track cyclist and cycling team manager. McGee grew up in a family of four brothers, who would all become cyclists at the Parramatta Cycling Club. In 1994, McGee placed fifth in the 10 Mile scratch race at the Commonwealth Games. He won the team pursuit at the 1995 UCI Track Cycling World Championships with his brother Bradley McGee and Tim O'Shannessey and Stuart O'Grady.

McGee would later compete as a road cyclist. In 1996 he competed in the Tour de Luxembourg, Tour du Limousin and Tour de L'Avenir. McGee later returned to Australia, competing in the 2001 and 2002 Herald Sun Tours.

In 2002, McGee became the team manager of FDJeux.com, an Australian development team for the Groupama–FDJ cycling team. That year, McGee won the Australian Madison Championships, a track cycling event. In 2004 McGee took part in the Jayco Bay Cycling Classic. In 2004, he was awarded the bronze medal with teammate Chris Sutton.

After leaving elite level cycling, McGee would continue as a cycling team manager and director. McGee would go on to support his brother Bradley throughout his prominent cycling career. McGee was driving the support vehicle in 2003 when his brother Bradley won the Prologue stage of that year's Tour de France. McGee would later drive the CSC-Saxo Bank team car to support Bradley during the 2008 Sun Tour. McGee has served as a cycling team director for teams including GreenEDGE, SouthAustralia.com-AIS sport and as a cycling coach. In 2007, McGee and his brothers Bradley and Craig McGee opened a cycling store in Bowral, NSW.

As of 2025, McGee continues as a competitive cyclist, appearing in criterium and mountain biking events.
