= Beuvron, Nièvre =

Beuvron
- Commune
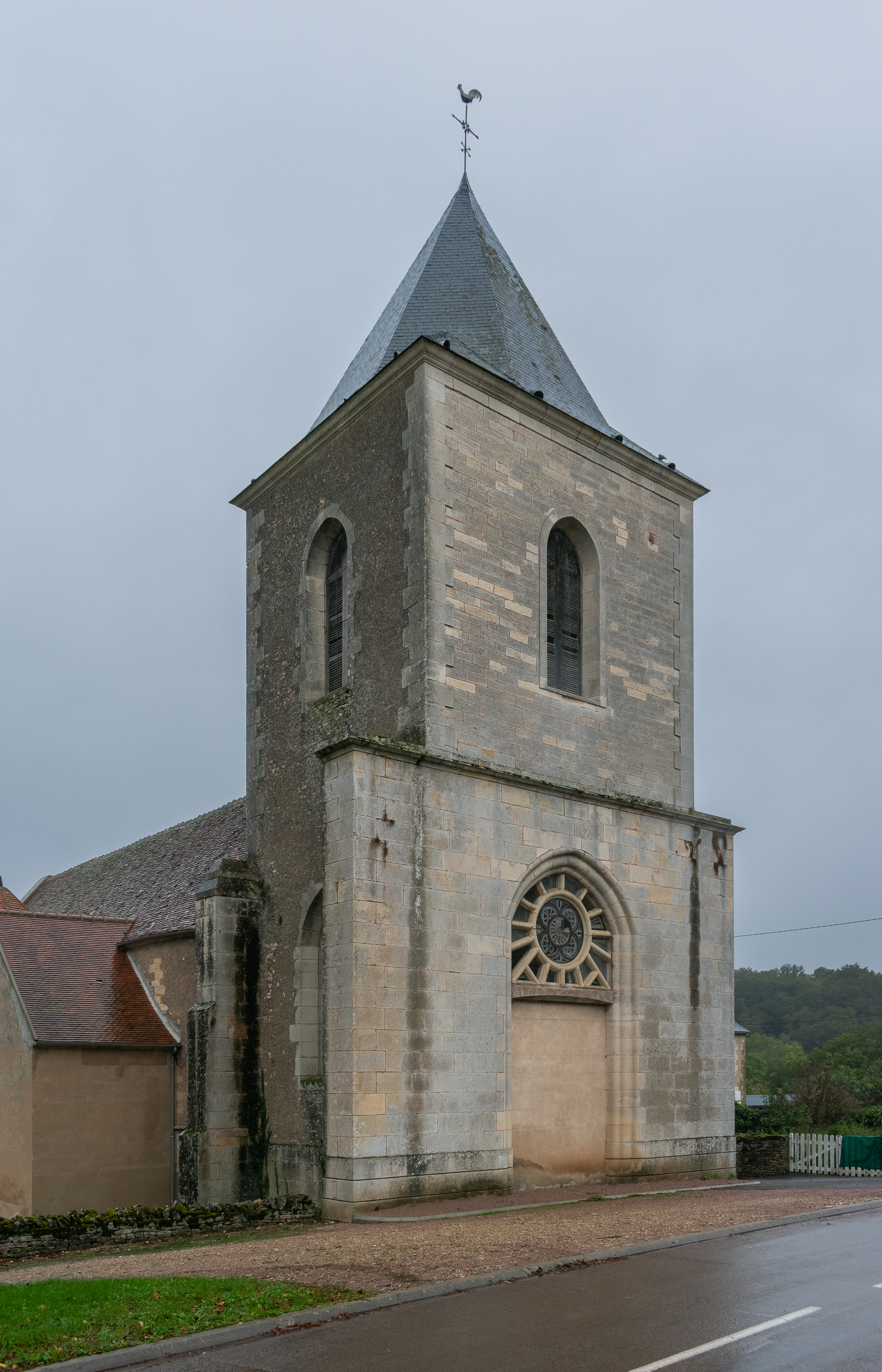
- Saint Peter church in Beuvron

- Coat of arms
- Location of Beuvron
- Location within France Location within Bourgogne-Franche-Comté
- Coordinates: 47°21′36″N 3°29′41″E
- Country: France
- Region: Bourgogne-Franche-Comté
- Department: Nièvre
- Arrondissement: Clamecy
- Canton: Corbigny

Government
  - Mayor (2020–2026): Cyril Michel
- Area^{1}: 9.50 km^{2} (3.67 sq mi)
- Highest elevation: 310 m (1,020 ft)
- Lowest elevation: 175 m (574 ft)
- Population (2023): 84
  - Density: 8.8/km^{2} (23/sq mi)
- Time zone: UTC+01:00 (CET)
  - Summer (DST): UTC+02:00 (CEST)
- INSEE/Postal code: 58029 /58210
- ^{1} French Land Register data, which excludes lakes, ponds, glaciers > 1 km^{2} (0.386 sq mi or 247 acres) and river estuaries.

Beuvron (French pronunciation: [bøvʁɔ̃]) is a commune in the Nièvre department in central France.

== Population ==
Historical population
Year	Pop.	±% p.a.
1968	90	—
1975	81	−1.49%
1982	82	+0.18%
1990	95	+1.86%
1999	81	−1.76%
2007	96	+2.15%
2012	99	+0.62%
2017	79	−4.41%
2023	84	+1.03%
Source: INSEE

== See also ==
- Communes of the Nièvre department
