= Andrey Klyuev (cyclist) =

Russian cyclist

Personal information
- Born: 13 June 1987 (age 39) Lipetsk, Russia

Cycling career
- Sport: Cycling
- Current team: Retired
- Discipline: Road
- Role: Rider

Professional teams
- 2006–2007: Omnibike Dynamo Moscow
- 2007: T-Mobile Team (stagiaire)
- 2009–2010: Moscow
- 2011: Amore & Vita

Andrey Klyuev (born 13 June 1987, in Lipetsk) is a Russian former professional road cyclist.

== Major results ==
2006
Tour of South China Sea

1st Points classification
1st Stages 1 & 5

3rd Ruota d'Oro
10th Overall Tour of Hainan

1st Stage 5

2007
1st Road race, UEC European Under–23 Road Championships
1st Boucle de l'Artois
1st Stage 5 Tour de Normandie
2nd Paris–Troyes
3rd Tour du Finistère
3rd Overall Les 3 Jours de Vaucluse

1st Points classification
1st Stage 2

3rd Grand Prix of Moscow
5th Overall Five Rings of Moscow
8th Classic Loire Atlantique
2008
3rd Trofeo Piva
10th Giro del Belvedere
