= Roman Saprykin =

Soviet cyclist

Personal information
- Born: 13 March 1974 (age 52)

Cycling career
- Sport: Cycling

Roman Saprykin (born 13 March 1974) is a Soviet former cyclist. He competed in the team time trial at the 1992 Summer Olympics for the Unified Team.
