= Team sprint =

Team event in track cycling

The team sprint (also sometimes known as the Olympic sprint) is a track cycling event. Despite its name, it is not a conventional cycling sprint event – it is a three-rider team time trial held over three laps of a velodrome. The riders use a standard track bicycle, which is single-speed with no freewheel or brakes.

The current men's world record time is 40.949 seconds. This was set by the Netherlands team of Jeffrey Hoogland, Harrie Lavreysen and Roy van den Berg at the 2024 Paris Olympics. The women's world record of 45.186 seconds was set by the British team of Emma Finucane, Katy Marchant and Sophie Capewell also at the 2024 Paris Olympics.

It was introduced in championship racing in 1995. The team sprint has been an Olympic event for men since 2000 and for women since 2012.

Like the team pursuit event, two teams race against each other, starting on opposite sides of the track. At the end of the first lap, the leading rider in each team pulls up the banking leaving the second rider to lead for the next lap; at the end of the second lap, the second rider does the same, leaving the third rider to complete the last lap on their own. The team with the faster time is the winner.

The third rider needs good endurance qualities to maintain high speed to the finish. Kilometre track time trial specialists are usually chosen for this role.

== Rules and format ==
The qualifying round sees each team racing by themselves against the clock. The aim of the qualifying round is to simply set the fastest possible time out of all the teams. In the Olympic Games qualifying teams will then progress into a knockout round against another team, with the two eventual surviving teams competing for the Gold and Silver and the next two competing for the bronze medal. In the World Championships and World Cup Classics meetings, the top two from the qualifying round progress straight to the final and the third and fourth quickest fight it out for the bronze medal.

== See also ==
- Team Sprint Rules
