= Track cycling =

Bicycle racing sport

Track Cycling
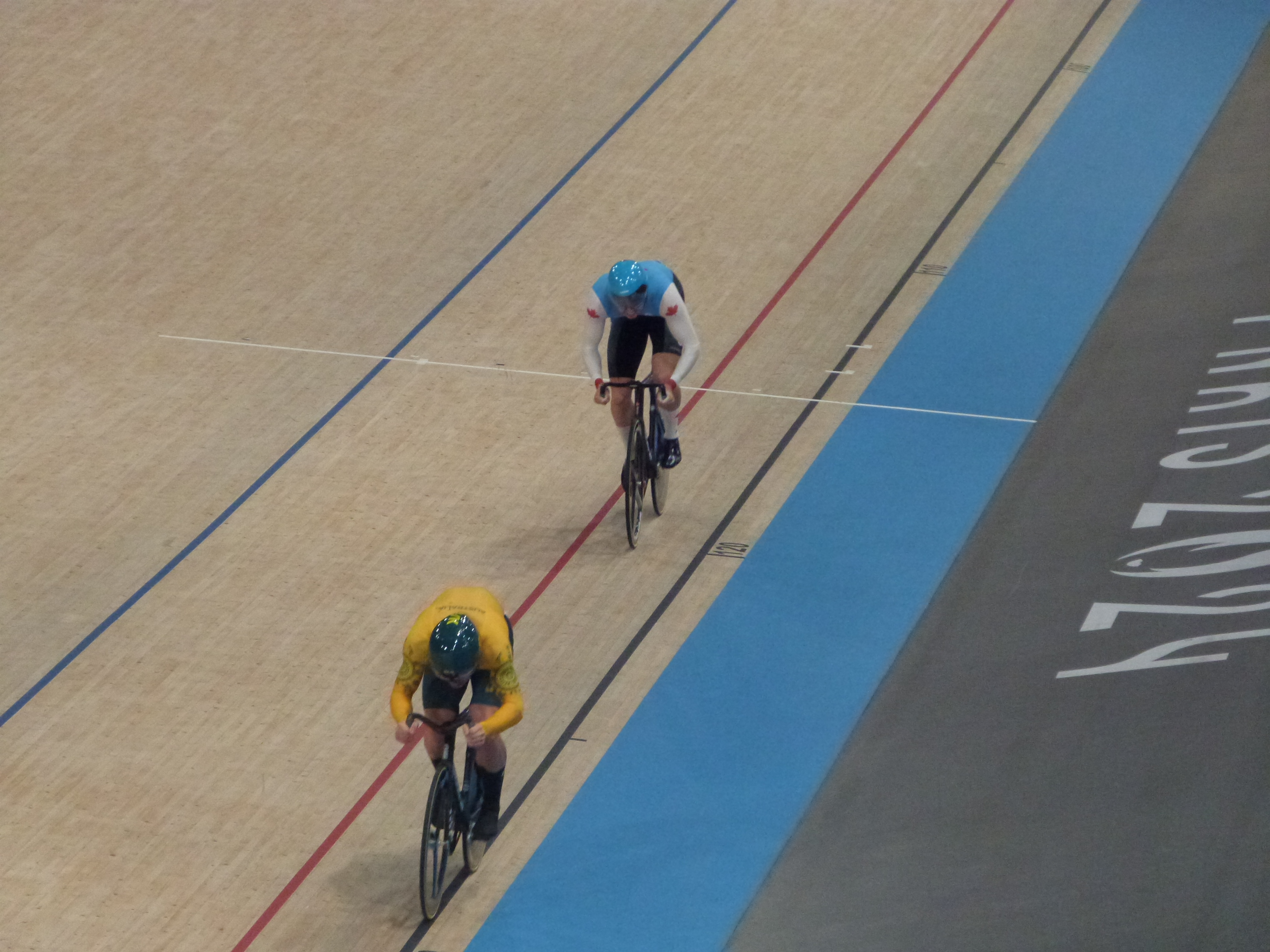
- A track cycling race at the third round of 2024 Summer Olympics in the Vélodrome National in Paris, France
- Highest governing body: UCI

Characteristics
- Contact: No, although occasionally unavoidable
- Team members: Individuals and team
- Mixed-sex: No
- Type: Cycle sport
- Equipment: Track bicycle
- Venue: Velodrome

Presence
- Country or region: Worldwide
- Olympic: Yes, men's since 1896 and women's since 1984 (with restrictions until 2012)
- Paralympic: Yes, men's and women's since 1996

Pictogram for Cycling at the Summer Olympics

Track cycling is a bicycle racing sport usually held on specially built banked tracks or velodromes using purpose-designed track bicycles.

== History ==
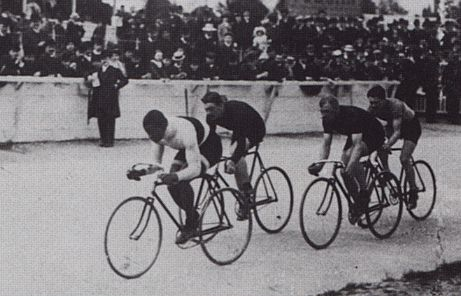
An outdoor track race in Paris in 1908 featuring Major Taylor, the first African-American cyclist to become world champion

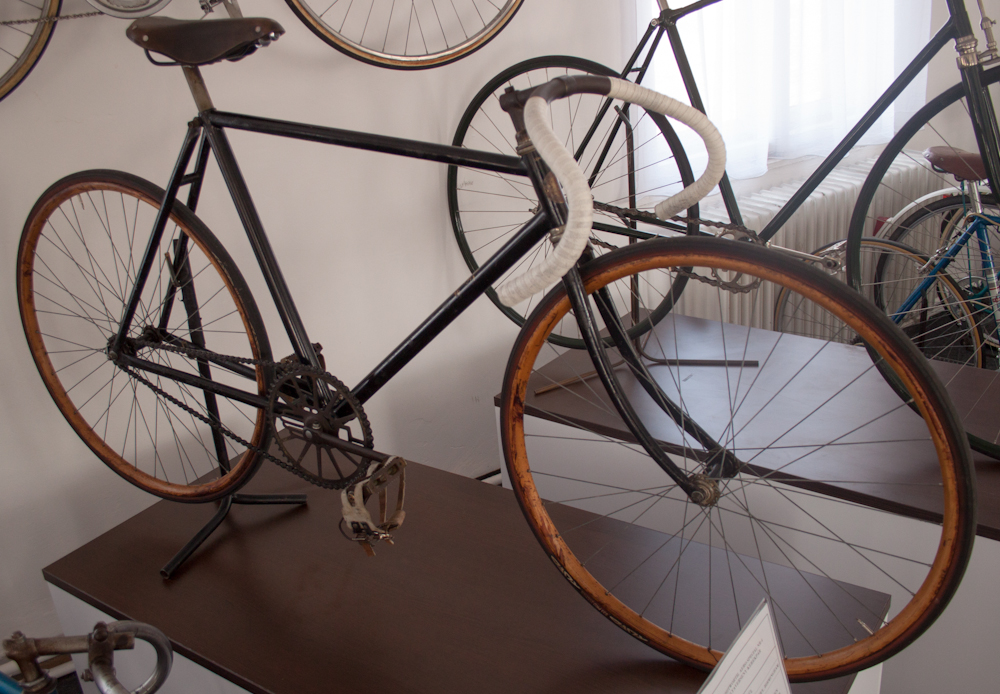
Aero Special track bicycle, original, c. 1910

Track cycling has been around since at least 1870. When track cycling was in its infancy, it was held on velodromes similar to the ones used today. These velodromes consisted of two straights and slightly banked turns, though they varied more in length and material than the modern 250 m track.

One appeal of indoor track racing was that spectators could be easily controlled, and hence an entrance fee could be charged, making track racing a lucrative sport. Early track races attracted crowds of up to 2,000 people. Indoor tracks also enabled year-round cycling for the first time. The main early centers for track racing in Britain were Birmingham, Sheffield, Liverpool, Manchester and London.

The most noticeable changes in over a century of track cycling have concerned the bikes themselves, engineered to be lighter and more aerodynamic to enable ever-faster times.

Track cycling has been featured in every modern Olympic Games except the 1912 Games. Women's track cycling events were first included in the modern Olympics in 1988. The sport was moved indoors since 2000 Summer Olympics in Sydney, Australia, mainly because of the hot weather.

Along the decades, track lengths have been gradually reduced. Early velodromes varied in length between 130 and 500 metres long. By the 1960s to 1989, a standard length of 333.333 metres (1,093 ft 7.346 in) length was commonly used for international competitions. Since 1990, international velodromes are built with a length of 250 metres (273.403 yd), though tracks of many lengths are still in use.

== Main centres ==
Indoor cycling at the Sportpaleis Alkmaar, Netherlands

Track cycling is particularly popular in Europe, notably Belgium, France, Germany and the United Kingdom where it is often used as off-season training by road racers who can frequently be seen at professional six-day events (races entered by two-rider teams.)

In the United States, track racing reached a peak of popularity in the 1930s when six-day races were held in Madison Square Garden in New York. The word "Madison" is still used as the name for a type of race.

In Japan, the keirin race format is a very popular betting sport. The sport is well-regarded, and riders are extensively trained through the Japanese Keirin School.

== Bicycles ==
The bicycles used are optimized for track racing; they are fixed-gear bicycles without freewheel or brakes, with narrow tires inflated to high pressure. Frame and other components are designed for rigidity and lightness, to give maximum speed over the distance of the race (sprint or longer).

== Race formats ==
Track cycling events fit into two broad categories: sprint races and endurance races. Riders will typically fall into one category and not compete in the other.

=== Sprint ===
Sprint races are generally between 3 and 8 laps in length and focus on raw sprinting power and race tactics over a small number of laps to defeat opponents. Sprint riders train specifically to compete in races of this length, and do not generally compete in endurance events.

The main sprint events are:

- Sprint
- Team sprint
- Keirin
- Track time trial

=== Endurance ===
Endurance races are held over longer distances. These races test the riders' endurance capacity, as well as tactics and speed. The length of track endurance events varies by race type, whether it is a part of the Omnium or not, and the gender of the competitors. Many track endurance riders also compete in road cycling events.

The main endurance events are:

- Individual pursuit
- Team pursuit
- Scratch race
- Points race
- Elimination race
- Madison
- Omnium

== Major competitive events ==
=== Olympic Games ===
There were six events in track cycling at the Olympics in 2024: team sprint, match sprint, keirin, omnium, team pursuit, and Madison. The Madison was added in the Tokyo 2020 Olympics held in 2021; the other races had been held in previous Games. There are separate races of each type for men and women; until the 2012 Summer Olympics there were fewer events for women.

=== World Championships ===
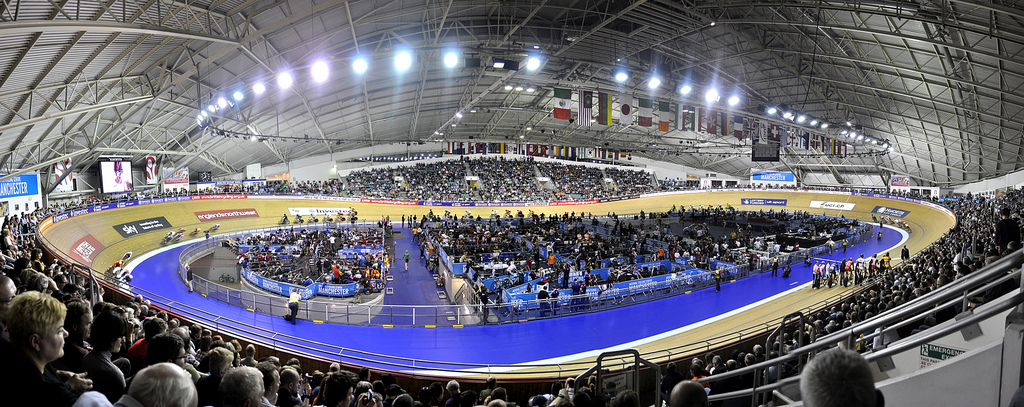
The Manchester Velodrome, a banked Siberian Pine-surfaced track, which has hosted the UCI World Championships on three occasions and home to British Cycling

The UCI Track Cycling World Championships are held every year, usually in March or April at the end of the winter track season. There are currently (2024) 22 events in the World Championships, 11 for men and 11 for women. Qualification places are determined by different countries performance during the World Cup Classic series held through the season.

=== World Cup ===
The UCI Track Cycling World Cup series consists of six meetings, held in different countries beginning annually in October, and finishing in January. These meetings include 17 of the 19 events (excluding the omnium for men and women) that take place in a World Championship over three days.

Events won and points scored by the riders throughout this series count towards qualification places individually and for their nation in the World Championships at the end of the season. The overall leader in each event may wear a white points leaders jersey at each race, with the overall winner at the end of the season may keep the jersey and wear it at the World Championships. Riders compete for either national teams or trade teams, though the future of trade teams is unknown after controversial decisions by the UCI to eliminate World Cup events, and replace them with Nation's Cup events.

=== Ranking ===
The UCI Track Cycling World Ranking is based upon the results in all UCI-sanctioned races over a twelve-month period. The ranking includes an individual and a nations ranking and includes the disciplines: individual pursuit, points race, scratch, sprint, time trial, keirin, omnium, team pursuit, team sprint and madison.

== Gender in track cycling ==
Women's track cycling was only introduced as an Olympic sport in 1988, and women were not permitted to compete in the same number of events as men until 2012. Though men and women currently compete in the same number of events, there are still significant differences between men's and women's races of the same type. For example, in the team sprint, men race three riders over three laps, whereas women race two riders over two laps, and men's individual pursuit is a 4 km race and women only race 3 km. It is also the case that women race shorter distances than men in mass start events such as stand-alone scratch and points races, and omnium events.

In 2018, Veronica Ivy (then known as Rachel McKinnon) became the first transgender World Champion in any sport, with a victory in the Masters Women Age 35–44 age category. In 2019, Ivy became a repeat champion in the same discipline. Though met with some criticism, Ivy holds her title as transgender athletes are permitted to compete as per the International Olympic Committee.

== Riding position ==
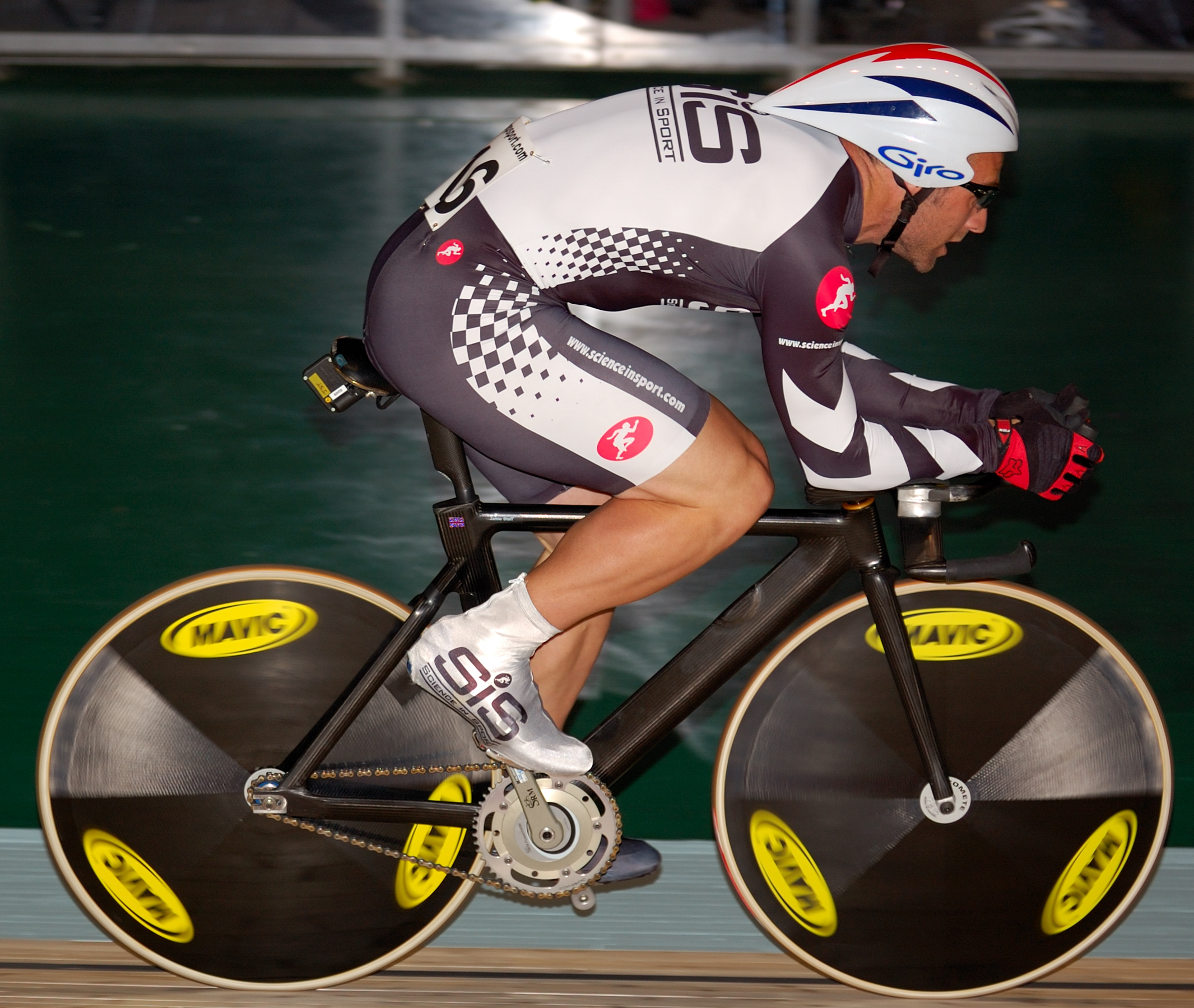
Jamie Staff riding a 1 km time trial

Aerodynamic drag is a significant factor in both road and track racing. Frames are often constructed of moulded carbon fiber, for a lightweight design. More recently, track bikes have employed airfoil designs on the tubes of the frame to reduce aerodynamic drag.

Given the importance of aerodynamics, the riders' sitting position becomes extremely important. The riding position is similar to the road racing position, but is ultimately dependent on the frame geometry of the bicycle and the handlebars used. Handlebars on track bikes used for longer events such as the points race are similar to the drop bars found on road bicycles. However, in the sprint event the rider's position is more extreme compared with a road rider. The bars are lower and the saddle is higher and more forward. Bars are often narrower with a deeper drop. Carbon fiber bars of many shapes, as opposed to lighter alloys, are used by many riders for their higher stiffness and durability.

In timed events such as the pursuit and the time trial, riders often use aerobars or 'triathlon bars' similar to those found on road time trial bicycles, allowing the rider to position the arms closer together in front of the body. This results in a more horizontal back and presents the minimum frontal area to reduce drag. Aerobars can be separate bars that are attached to time trial or bull horn bars, or they can be part of a one-piece monocoque design. Use of aerobars is permitted only in pursuit and time trial events.

Formats of track cycle races are also heavily influenced by aerodynamics. If one rider closely follows, they draft or slipstream another, because the leading rider pushes air around themselves; any rider closely following has to push out less air than the lead rider and thus can travel at the same speed while expending less effort. This fact has led to a variety of racing styles that allow skilled riders or teams to exploit this tactical advantage, as well as formats that simply test strength, speed and endurance.

During the early 1990s in individual pursuit events, some riders, including Graeme Obree, adopted a straight-armed Superman-like position with their arms fully extended horizontally, but this position was subsequently outlawed by the Union Cycliste Internationale (UCI), the sport's ruling body.

=== Track geometry and performance ===
The geometry of a velodrome can affect the physical demands of track cycling. Banked bends, transitions between straight and curved sections, and changes in the cyclist's centre of mass influence the power required to maintain speed. Mathematical models of velodrome riding account for aerodynamic drag, rolling resistance, lateral friction and the energy associated with changes in elevation as cyclists move through the track's bends.

Experimental research has also examined the relationship between steering, bicycle lean and power output during velodrome riding. A 2022 study using instrumented track bicycles found that steering angles varied during each pedal stroke and that measured power decreased when entering bends as the bicycle's lean angle changed.

== Records ==
In addition to regular track racing, tracks are also the venue for many speed records. These are over either a fixed distance or for a fixed period of time. Generally, time trial events (200 m, 500 m, 1 km, and Individual Pursuit) will be recorded for both gender categories as well as several age categories on each track, for each nation, and for the world.

One of the most prestigious records is the hour record, which involves riding as far as possible in one hour. This record has been attempted by some of the greatest names in cycling including Major Taylor, Henri Desgrange, Fausto Coppi, Anna Wilson, Eddy Merckx, Francesco Moser, Jeannie Longo and Tony Rominger). Attempts have often been made at high-altitude locations, such as Mexico City, Mexico or Aguascalientes, Mexico, where the thinner air results in lower aerodynamic drag, offsetting the added difficulty of breathing. Innovations in equipment and the rider's position on the bike have also led to dramatic improvements in the hour record, but have also been a source of controversy (see Graeme Obree).

== See also ==
- Outline of bicycles
- Outline of cycling
- List of cycling tracks and velodromes
- Icetrack cycling
- Cycle speedway
- BMX racing
