= Sprint (track cycling) =

Event in track cycling

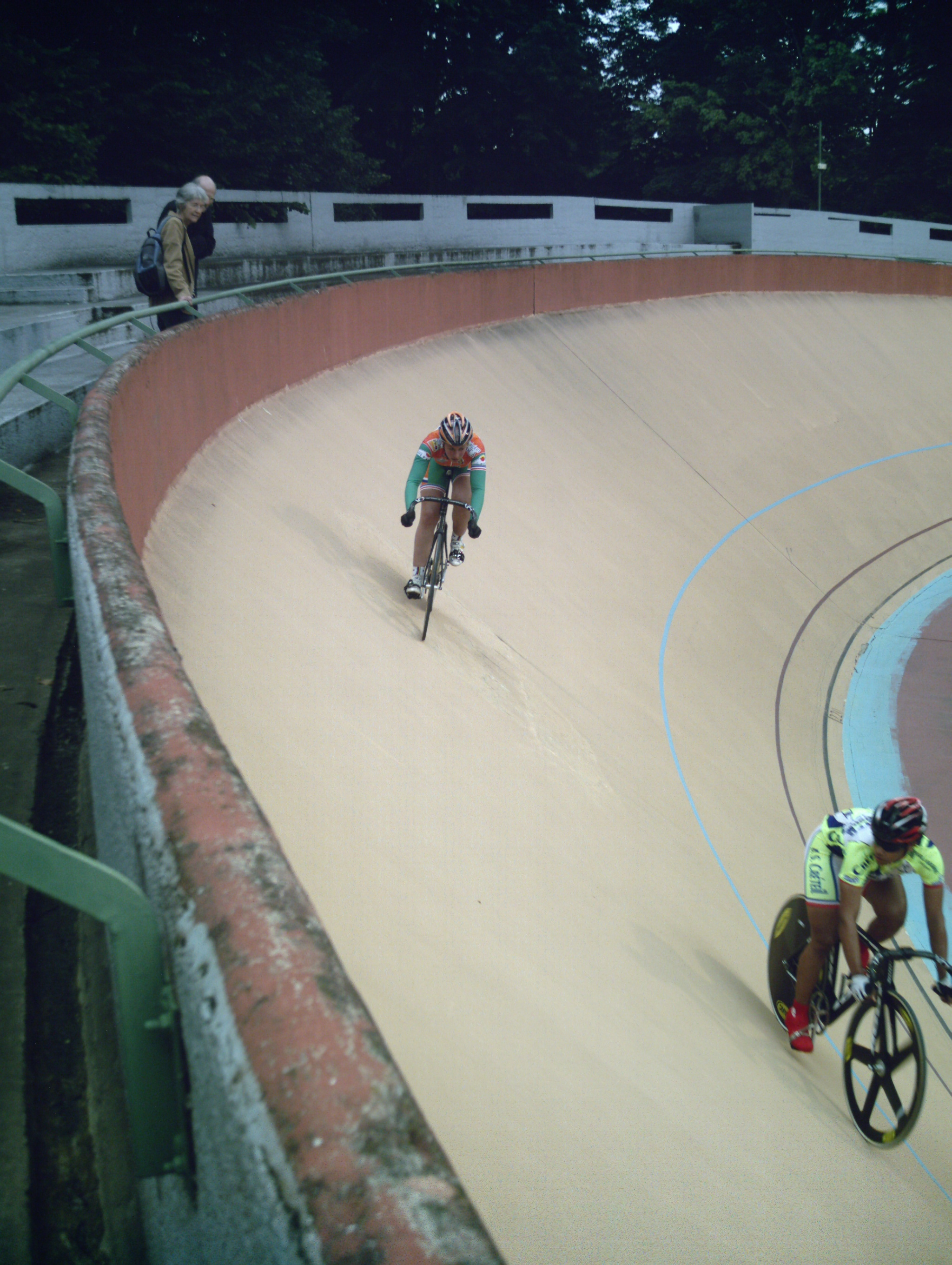
During a sprint

The sprint or match sprint is a track cycling event involving between two and four riders, though it is usually run as a one-on-one match race between opponents who, unlike in the individual pursuit, start next to each other. Men's sprint has been an Olympic event at every games except 1904 (which had races at seven different distances) and 1912 (which had no track cycling events). Women's sprints have been contested at every Olympics since 1988.

== Racing style ==
Depending on the size of the velodrome, this event can be from 250 m to 1000 m. Unlike the sprints in athletics, these events do not usually start with riders sprinting from the starting line and they are not confined to lanes. The early parts of each race will often be highly tactical with riders pedalling slowly, as they carefully jockey for position, often trying to force their opponents up high on the track in an attempt to get their rivals to make the first move. Some even bring their bicycles to a complete stop, balanced upright with both feet still on the pedals and both hands on the handle bars (a track stand), in an attempt to make the other rider take the lead. Track stands can only be held for a certain time and it is not permissible to go backwards in a track stand by rocking backwards and forwards as the judge will be following the track stand from the bottom of the track. The reason for this behaviour, as in many track cycling events, is both aerodynamics and tactics.

When racing at high speed, the rider who manages to stay just behind their opponent can draft, expending less effort. By riding behind the 'lead out' rider, the second rider reduces the aerodynamic drag felt. Just before the finish, the trailing rider pulls out of the slipstream, and aided by fresher legs, may be able to overtake the opponent before the line. To prevent this, the leading rider may choose to accelerate quickly before the last lap, hoping to catch their opponent off guard and establish a large enough gap to negate the aerodynamic effect or to keep the speed high enough to prevent their opponent from completing a pass.

During the race, the lead out rider may choose to hug the measurement line on the inside of the track giving them the shortest path around the track. Likewise, they may choose to hug the sprinter's line (a red line 85 cm up track) to force their opponent to come higher over the top of them. The sprinter's line defines the sprinter's lane; once the sprint is initiated riders may not drop into the sprinter's lane or cross out of the lane unless they have a clear lead over their opponent.

== Rules ==
As defined by Union Cycliste Internationale (UCI) rules, riders must complete the flying 200 m time trial to qualify for the sprint competition. In this round, each rider completes two to three warm up laps and then completes the final 200 m, which is usually just under a lap. The number of riders that qualify for the sprint rounds depends on the competition; in World Cup competitions, 16 riders will advance and in a world championship, 24 riders will advance. The top riders are seeded in the following rounds, meaning the fastest qualifier will face the slowest qualifier and so on. Knock-out rounds then proceed, initially on a one race basis and then on a best-of three-race format from the quarter-final stage. Riders defeated in the earlier rounds may get a chance to continue in the competition through the repechage races.

The Netherlands and New Zealand currently hold two of the major titles in this event. Harrie Lavreysen is Olympic men's sprint champion, and Ellesse Andrews is the Olympic women's sprint champion.

== Variants ==
=== Keirin ===
The Keirin is a variant of the sprint in which a higher number (usually 6–8, or 9 in Japan) of sprinters compete in a very different format. Riders are paced in the early laps by (and are required to stay behind) a Derny motorcycle, which slowly increases the speed of the race from 25 km/h to about 50 km/h. It then leaves the track with about 600–700 m remaining. The first rider across the finish line in the high-speed (sometimes 70 km/h) finish is the winner.

=== Team sprint ===
The men's team sprint (also known as the Olympic sprint) is a short distance three-man team pursuit held over three laps of a velodrome. Like the (much longer) team pursuit event, two teams race against each other, starting on opposite sides of the track, but at the end of the first lap, the leading rider in each team drops out of the race by riding up the banking leaving the second rider to lead for the second lap; at the end of the second lap, the second rider does the same, leaving the third rider to complete the last lap on his own. In the women's event, teams of two compete over a two-lap distance. The team sprint has been an Olympic event for men since 2000 and for women since 2012.

=== Chariot ===
The chariot is a short, usually one lap, race. Depending on track size, between four and eight cyclists start from a standing start, and do an all out sprint for one lap. The first rider across the finish line is the winner.
