= Track time trial =

Track cycling discipline

The track time trial is a track cycling event where cyclists compete individually against the clock to record the fastest time over the specified distance from a standing start.

== Time trial bikes ==
Track time trial bikes differ from normal track bikes in two major ways; firstly they have disc or 3–5 spoked wheels, and secondly they often use aero-bars to allow the rider to adopt a more aerodynamic riding position. The frames are often more streamlined to reduce air resistance.

== Men – 1000 m time trial ==
At the UCI Track World Championships, the distance for senior men is 1000 m, hence the event's alternative name, the 'Kilo', short for kilometre. Junior men also race 1000 m. Being such a short, high-intensity event, the kilo is popular with riders who specialise in the sprint. The Kilo time trial was removed from the Olympics programme after 2004 to make way for BMX racing. This led to a number of Kilo riders, most notably Chris Hoy, to begin focusing on other sprint events.

This event is a race against the clock from a standing start over 1000 m. Most indoor tracks are 250 m in length, so a kilo is usually held over four laps. Other common track lengths are 167 m (six laps), 333 m (three laps) or 400 m (2.5 laps). Riders will keep to the black line at the bottom of the track to ensure they have to cover the least distance over the 1000 m. Riders usually only get one attempt to set a time, and the winner of the event is simply the rider to post the quickest time.

A fast time at the elite level is around 1 minute 5 seconds.

The world record is 55.433 seconds (64.943 km/h), set by Jeffrey Hoogland in 2023 at the Aguascalientes Velodrome in Aguascalientes, Mexico.

== Women – 500 m time trial ==
The Women's version of the event is held over 500 m. Other than the race distance this is the same as the men's Kilo event, with the fastest rider over the distance declared the winner. This event was also removed from the Olympic programme after 2004 to make way for BMX.

The world record is held by Russian rider Anastasia Voynova; set on 17 October 2015 in Grenchen, Switzerland, during the European championships with 32.794 seconds (54.888 km/h).

== Flying 200 m time trial ==
The flying 200 m time trial (so-called because riders have a flying start, as opposed to the standing start in the kilo/500 m) is rarely held on its own. It is more commonly used as the qualifying event for the sprint competition, or as part of an Omnium competition. Velodromes have a line painted across the track at 200 m before the finish line, for this purpose. Therefore, the size the track will determine where the 200-meter line is (for 250 m tracks, it is about two-thirds of the way through the first bend; for 200-meter tracks, it is the finish line; for 400-meter tracks, it is the start line in the back straight). The clock will start as they cross this line and stop when they reach the finish line.

Depending on the size of the track, riders have between one and three laps to build up speed before the clock starts. They will ride around the very top of the track as they near the start line, then drop down to the bottom to gain as much speed as possible from rolling down the steep inclined banking. The Flying 200 m is ridden on a standard track bike (drop handlebars, spoked front wheel) when it is part of the Sprint competition, and often during the Omnium as well so riders need have only one bike. Disc front wheel is permitted for sprint qualification round. UCI rules and regulations Article 1.3.018

A fast time at the elite level is just above 10 seconds for men, 11 seconds for women.

The world record of 9.100 seconds was set by Nicholas Paul of Trinidad and Tobago at the Elite Pan American Track Cycling Championships in Cochabamba, Bolivia on September 6, 2019.

The Olympic Record of 9.551 seconds was set by Jason Kenny of Great Britain at the Rio 2016 Olympics, beating his own Olympic Record of 9.713 seconds set at the 2012 London Olympics.

== See also ==
- Track time trial at the Olympics
- UCI Track Cycling World Championships – Men's 1 km time trial
- UCI Track Cycling World Championships – Women's 500 m time trial
