= Individual pursuit =

Track cycling event

The individual pursuit is a track cycling event where two cyclists begin the race from a stationary position on opposite sides of the track. It is held at over 4 kilometres (2.5 mi) for men and women. The riders start at the same time and set off to complete the race distance in the fastest time. They ride on the pursuit line at the bottom of the track to find the fastest line, with each rider trying to catch the other who started on the other side. If the catch is achieved, the successful pursuer is the winner. However, they can continue the rest of the race distance to set the fastest time in a qualifying race or a record in a final.

== Qualification and race format ==
The first round of the competition at major events is the qualifying round. This still involves two riders on the track at the same time but they are not directly competing against each other but attempting to set the fastest time to progress in the competition. In the Olympic Games the top riders progress into knock out rounds, with the top two surviving into the Gold and Silver medal race and next two into the Bronze Medal race. In the World Championships or World Cup Classic events, the top two riders from the qualifying round progress directly to the Gold and Silver medal race while the third and fourth qualifiers fight it out for Bronze.

As of 2009, the IOC "approved a UCI recommendation to restructure track events at the 2012 Games in London, including the abandonment of individual pursuit events."

== Notable individual pursuiters ==
=== Men ===
The last men's Olympic champion in this event was Great Britain's Bradley Wiggins. As of 2024, the men's world champion is Italy's Jonathan Milan.

- Roger Rivière (France) (three time world professional champion, 1957-1959)
- Hugh Porter (UK) (four time world 5 km professional champion)
- Graeme Obree (twice world champion and set a world record twice)
- Chris Boardman (Olympic champion 1992 and world champion 1994 and 1996)
- Sir Bradley Wiggins (twice Olympic champion and three time world champion, later Tour de France winner)
- Taylor Phinney (double world champion)
- Jack Bobridge (set 4 km world record of 4 mins 10.53 seconds in 2011)
- Lasse Norman Hansen (4 km olympic record)
- Ashton Lambie (first to ride a sub-4 minute 4 kilometer pursuit with a 3 min 59.93 second time on August 18, 2021)
- Filippo Ganna (4 km world record with 3 min 59.636 seconds at the 2022 World Championship in Paris, October 24, 2022)
- Josh Charlton (rode an 11 second personal best setting an unexpected world record during qualifying at the 2024 World Championship in Denmark, October 19, 2024, joining the very small sub 4 minute club)
- Jonathan Milan (4 km world record at 3 minutes, 58.850 seconds at the 2026 World Championship in Shanghai, October 16, 2026)

=== Women ===
The last women's Olympic champion in this event was Great Britain's Rebecca Romero. As of 2024, the women's world champion in this event is Welsh cyclist Anna Morris.

- Beryl Burton (five time world champion)
- Tamara Garkushina (six time world champion)
- Rebecca Twigg (six time world champion)
- Jeannie Longo (three time world champion)
- Leontien van Moorsel (Olympic and four time world champion)
- Sarah Ulmer (Olympic and world champion)
- Sarah Hammer (five time world champion)
- Rebecca Romero (Olympic and world champion)
- Chloé Dygert (three time world champion and world record holder)

== See also ==
- World record progression – Men's individual pursuit
- World record progression – Women's individual pursuit
- Team pursuit
- Track cycling
