= Cycling at the 1992 Summer Olympics – Men's points race =

Olympic cycling event

Men's points race at the Games of the XXV Olympiad
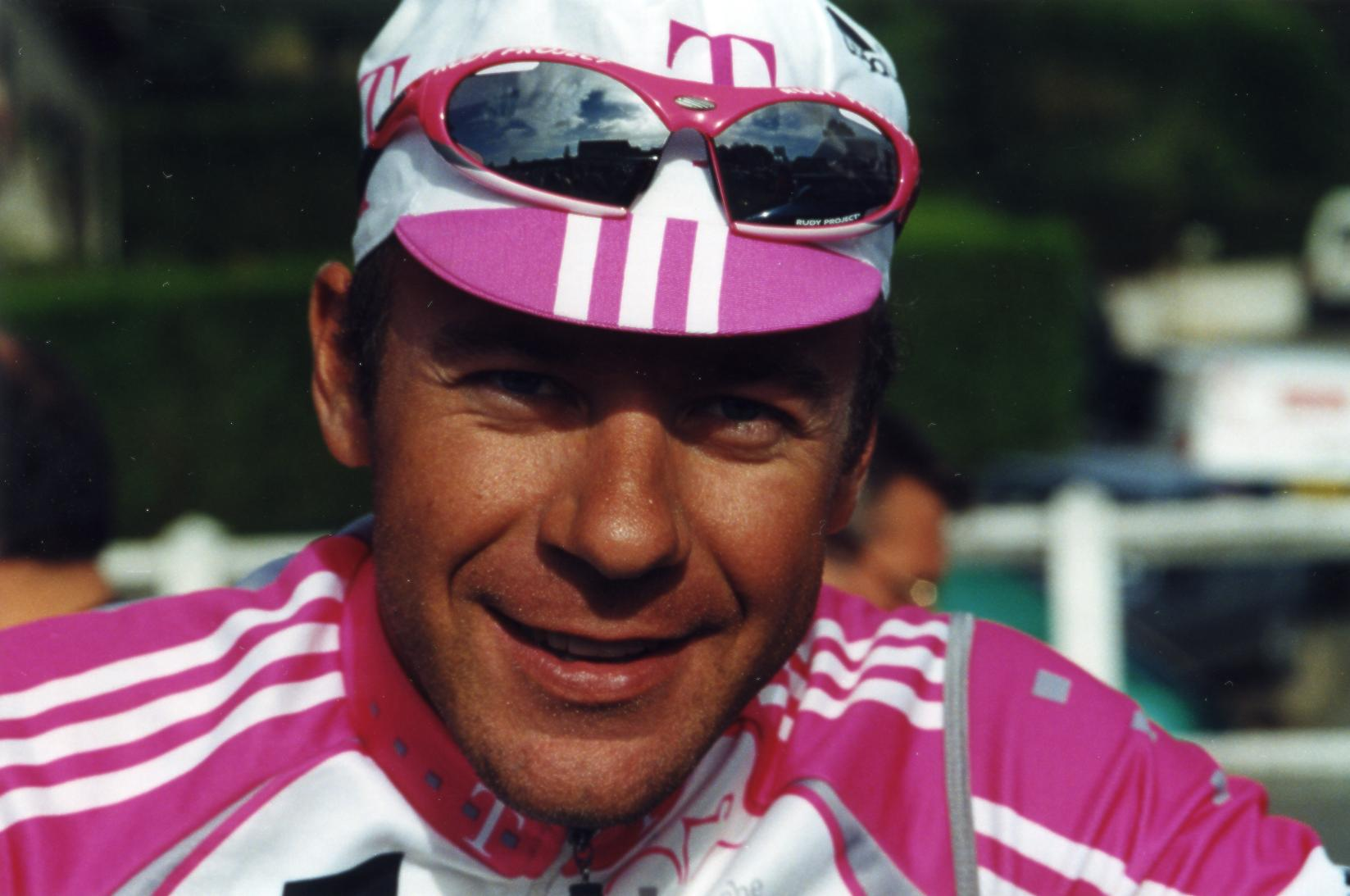
- Giovanni Lombardi (1998)
- Venue: Velòdrom d'Horta
- Dates: 28–31 July
- Competitors: 38 from 38 nations
- Winning score: 44 (0 laps behind)

Medalists
1st place, gold medalist(s)		Giovanni Lombardi; Italy
2nd place, silver medalist(s)		Léon van Bon; Netherlands
3rd place, bronze medalist(s)		Cédric Mathy; Belgium

The men's points race was an event at the 1992 Summer Olympics in Barcelona, Spain. There were 38 competitors from 38 nations, with 24 cyclists competing in the final. Each nation was limited to one cyclist in the event. The event was won by Giovanni Lombardi of Italy, the nation's first victory (and first medal) in the event since 1900 and second victory overall; Italy was the first nation to have two wins in the men's points race. Léon van Bon gave the Netherlands its second consecutive silver in the event. Bronze went to Cédric Mathy of Belgium.

== Background ==
This was the fourth appearance of the event. It was first held in 1900 and not again until 1984; after that, it was held every Summer Games until 2008 when it was removed from the programme. The women's version was held from 1996 through 2008.

Six of the 24 finalists from the 1988 Games returned: gold medalist Dan Frost of Denmark, ninth-place finisher (and 1984 bronze medalist) José Youshimatz of Mexico, eleventh-place finisher Giovanni Lombardi of Italy, fifteenth-place finisher Gene Samuel of Trinidad and Tobago, sixteenth-place finisher Wojciech Pawłak of Poland, and twenty-fourth-place finisher Fernando Louro of Brazil. Stephen McGlede of Australia was the 1990 World Champion; the reigning (1991) World Champion, Bruno Risi of Switzerland, was not competing.

The People's Republic of China, Cuba, Greece, Latvia, and South Africa each made their debut in the event. Some former Soviet republics competed together as the Unified Team (with a Ukrainian cyclist in this event). One Yugoslav cyclist competed as an Independent Olympic Participant. France and Italy both competed for the fourth time, the only nations to have competed in all four Olympic men's points races.

== Competition format ==
The contest consisted of two rounds: semifinals and a final. The distance varied by round, with 30 kilometres (19 mi) in the semifinals and 50 kilometres (31 mi) in the final. The top 12 in each of the two semifinals advanced to the 24-man final. Placement in each race was determined first by how many laps behind the leader the cyclist was and second by how many sprint points the cyclist accumulated. That is, a cyclist with more sprint points but who was lapped once would be ranked behind a cyclist with fewer points but who had not been lapped. Sprint points could be gained only by cyclists who had not been lapped.

In the semifinals, there were 20 sprints—one every 1.5 kilometres (0.93 mi). Points were awarded based on the position of the cyclists at the end of the sprint. Most of the sprints were worth 5 points for the leader, 3 to the second-place cyclist, 2 to third, and 1 to fourth. The 10th (halfway) and 20th (final) sprint were worth double: 10 points, 6, 4, and 2.

The final featured 30 sprints—one every 1.67 kilometres (1.04 mi). As in the semifinals, most sprints were worth 5/3/2/1 points, with the halfway (15th) and final (30th) sprints worth 10/6/4/2.

== Schedule ==
All times are Central European Summer Time (UTC+2)

Date	Time	Round
Tuesday, 28 July 1992	20:00	Semifinals
Friday, 31 July 1992	21:00	Final

== Results ==
=== Semifinals ===
==== Semifinal 1 ====
Rank	Cyclist	Nation	Laps behind	Points	Notes
1	Simon Lillistone	Great Britain	0	9	Q
2	Franz Stocher	Austria	1	31	Q
3	Éric Magnin	France	1	30	Q
4	José Youshimatz	Mexico	1	28	Q
5	Vasyl Yakovlev	Unified Team	1	23	Q
6	José Velásquez	Colombia	1	22	Q
7	Andreas Aeschbach	Switzerland	1	18	Q
8	Dan Frost	Denmark	1	17	Q
9	Gene Samuel	Trinidad and Tobago	1	17	Q
10	Murugayan Kumaresan	Malaysia	1	11	Q
11	Li Wenkai	China	1	8	Q
12	Wojciech Pawłak	Poland	1	7	Q
13	James Carney	United States	1	6	
14	Fernando Louro	Brazil	1	5	
15	Weng Yu-yi	Chinese Taipei	2	10	
—	Nigel Neil Lloyd	Antigua and Barbuda	DNF	—	
—	Dušan Popeskov	Independent Olympic Participants	DNF	—	
—	Scott Richardson	South Africa	DNF	—	
—	Aubrey Richmond	Guyana	DNF	—	

==== Semifinal 2 ====
Rank	Cyclist	Nation	Laps behind	Points	Notes
1	Stephen McGlede	Australia	0	16	Q
2	Glenn McLeay	New Zealand	0	15	Q
3	Patrick Matt	Liechtenstein	0	3	Q
4	Lubor Tesař	Czechoslovakia	1	32	Q
5	Giovanni Lombardi	Italy	1	28	Q
6	Guido Fulst	Germany	1	21	Q
7	Léon van Bon	Netherlands	1	21	Q
8	Conrado Cabrera	Cuba	1	18	Q
9	Miklós Somogyi	Hungary	1	13	Q
10	Cédric Mathy	Belgium	1	13	Q
11	Hiroshi Daimon	Japan	1	12	Q
12	Erminio Suárez	Argentina	1	11	Q
13	Park Min-su	South Korea	1	10	
14	Arnolds Ūdris	Latvia	1	10	
15	Miguel Droguett	Chile	1	7	
16	Gabriel Aynat	Spain	1	7	
17	Georgios Portelanos	Greece	1	3	
18	John Malois	Canada	1	1	
—	Majid Naseri	Iran	DNF	—	

=== Final ===
Three of the cyclists did not finish, but all 21 of the remaining competitors remained unlapped and could score the final sprint points. Van Bon led with 41 points going into the final sprint, 3 ahead of Lombardi. With 4 points between 1st and 2nd, between 2nd and 4th, and between 3rd and 5th, Lombardi needed to place in the top three with some help from van Bon's position if Lombardi did not finish 1st. Mathy, at 31 points, was also able to win, but needed to finish 1st with van Bon no better than 5th and Lombardi no better than 4th in the final sprint.

Mathy won the final sprint. Van Bon was ahead of Lombardi early, but Lombardi was able to move up to 2nd while van Bon fell to 4th. The points for the three of them in the final sprint were 10 for Mathy, bringing him to 41, 6 to Lombardi (44 total), and 2 to van Bon (43 total). Lombardi took gold, van Bon silver, and Mathy bronze.

Rank	Cyclist	Nation	Laps behind	Points
1st place, gold medalist(s)	Giovanni Lombardi	Italy	0	44
2nd place, silver medalist(s)	Léon van Bon	Netherlands	0	43
3rd place, bronze medalist(s)	Cédric Mathy	Belgium	0	41
4	Glenn McLeay	New Zealand	0	30
5	Lubor Tesař	Czechoslovakia	0	30
6	Éric Magnin	France	0	24
7	Guido Fulst	Germany	0	24
8	Andreas Aeschbach	Switzerland	0	23
9	Franz Stocher	Austria	0	18
10	Erminio Suárez	Argentina	0	16
11	Hiroshi Daimon	Japan	0	14
12	Wojciech Pawłak	Poland	0	12
13	Conrado Cabrera	Cuba	0	12
14	José Youshimatz	Mexico	0	11
15	Dan Frost	Denmark	0	7
16	José Velásquez	Colombia	0	6
17	Patrick Matt	Liechtenstein	0	5
18	Simon Lillistone	Great Britain	0	5
19	Gene Samuel	Trinidad and Tobago	0	4
20	Li Wenkai	China	0	1
21	Murugayan Kumaresan	Malaysia	0	0
—	Stephen McGlede	Australia	DNF	—
—	Miklós Somogyi	Hungary	DNF	—
—	Vasyl Yakovlev	Unified Team	DNF	—

== Results summary ==
Rank	Cyclist	Nation	Semifinals		Final	
Rank	Cyclist	Nation	Laps behind	Points	Laps behind	Points
1st place, gold medalist(s)	Giovanni Lombardi	Italy	1	28	0	44
2nd place, silver medalist(s)	Léon van Bon	Netherlands	1	21	0	43
3rd place, bronze medalist(s)	Cédric Mathy	Belgium	1	13	0	41
4	Glenn McLeay	New Zealand	0	15	0	30
5	Lubor Tesař	Czechoslovakia	1	32	0	30
6	Éric Magnin	France	1	30	0	24
7	Guido Fulst	Germany	1	21	0	24
8	Andreas Aeschbach	Switzerland	1	18	0	23
9	Franz Stocher	Austria	1	31	0	18
10	Erminio Suárez	Argentina	1	11	0	16
11	Hiroshi Daimon	Japan	1	12	0	14
12	Wojciech Pawłak	Poland	1	7	0	12
13	Conrado Cabrera	Cuba	1	18	0	12
14	José Youshimatz	Mexico	1	28	0	11
15	Dan Frost	Denmark	1	17	0	7
16	José Velásquez	Colombia	1	22	0	6
17	Patrick Matt	Liechtenstein	0	3	0	5
18	Simon Lillistone	Great Britain	0	9	0	5
19	Gene Samuel	Trinidad and Tobago	1	17	0	4
20	Li Wenkai	China	1	8	0	1
21	Murugayan Kumaresan	Malaysia	1	11	0	0
22	Stephen McGlede	Australia	0	16	DNF	—
22	Miklós Somogyi	Hungary	1	13	DNF	—
22	Vasyl Yakovlev	Unified Team	1	23	DNF	—
25	Park Min-su	South Korea	1	10	Did not advance	
26	Arnolds Ūdris	Latvia	1	10	Did not advance	
27	Miguel Droguett	Chile	1	7	Did not advance	
28	Gabriel Aynat	Spain	1	7	Did not advance	
29	James Carney	United States	1	6	Did not advance	
30	Fernando Louro	Brazil	1	5	Did not advance	
31	Georgios Portelanos	Greece	1	3	Did not advance	
32	John Malois	Canada	1	1	Did not advance	
33	Weng Yu-yi	Chinese Taipei	2	10	Did not advance	
—	Nigel Neil Lloyd	Antigua and Barbuda	DNF	—	Did not advance	
—	Majid Naseri	Iran	DNF	—	Did not advance	
—	Dušan Popeskov	Independent Olympic Participants	DNF	—	Did not advance	
—	Scott Richardson	South Africa	DNF	—	Did not advance	
—	Aubrey Richmond	Guyana	DNF	—	Did not advance	
—	Craig Merren	Cayman Islands	DNS	—	Did not advance	
