= World and Olympic records set at the 1992 Summer Olympics =

A number of world records and Olympic records were set in various events at the 1992 Summer Olympics in Barcelona, Spain.

== Records by sport ==
=== Cycling ===
Event	Name	Nation	Time	Date	Record
Men's flying 200 m time trial	Jens Fiedler	Germany	10"252	28 July	OR
Men's individual pursuit	Chris Boardman	Great Britain	4'27"357	27 July	WR, OR
Men's individual pursuit	Chris Boardman	Great Britain	4'24"496	28 July	WR, OR
Men's team pursuit	Brett Aitken; Stephen McGlede; Shaun O’Brien; Stuart O'Grady	Australia	4'11"245	30 July	WR, OR
Men's team pursuit	Brett Aitken; Stephen McGlede; Shaun O’Brien; Stuart O'Grady	Australia	4'10"438	30 July	WR, OR
Men's team pursuit	Michael Glockner; Jens Lehmann; Stefan Steinweg; Guido Fulst	Germany	4'08"791	31 July	WR, OR
Women's individual pursuit	Kathy Watt	Australia	3'41"886	30 July	OR
Women's individual pursuit	Petra Rossner	Germany	3'41"509	30 July	OR

OR = Olympic record, WR = World record
