= Cycling at the 1992 Summer Olympics – Men's team pursuit =

These are the official results of the Men's Team Pursuit at the 1992 Summer Olympics in Barcelona, Spain. The races were held on Thursday, July 30, and Friday, July 31, 1992, at the Velòdrom d'Hortawith a race distance of 4 km.

== Medalists ==
Gold	Silver	Bronze
Germany; Stefan Steinweg; Andreas Walzer; Guido Fulst; Michael Glöckner; Jens Lehmann	Australia; Stuart O'Grady; Brett Aitken; Stephen McGlede; Shaun O'Brien	Denmark; Jan Petersen; Michael Sandstød; Ken Frost; Jimmi Madsen; Klaus Kynde Nielsen

== Results ==
- Q Qualified for next round.
- overtaken Overtaken by opponent during heat.
- DNS Did not start.
- WR New world record.

=== Qualifying round ===
Held July 30

The twenty-one teams raced against the clock, not against each other. The teams with the eight fastest times advanced to the quarter-final.

Pos.	Athlete	NOC	Time	Ave. Speed	Qual.	Notes
1	Brett Aitken; Stephen McGlede; Shaun O'Brien; Stuart O'Grady	Australia	4:11.245	57.314 km/h	Q	WR
2	Michael Glöckner; Jens Lehmann; Stefan Steinweg; Guido Fulst; Andreas Walzer	Germany	4:14.934	56.485 km/h	Q	
3	Ivan Beltrami; Rossano Brasi; Ivan Cerioli; Fabrizio Trezzi; Giovanni Lombardi	Italy	4:15.103	56.447 km/h	Q	
4	Ken Frost; Jimmi Madsen; Jan Petersen; Klaus Kynde Nielsen; Michael Sandstød	Denmark	4:17.719	55.874 km/h	Q	
5	Chris Boardman; Paul Jennings; Bryan Steel; Glen Sword	Great Britain	4:19.126	55.571 km/h	Q	
6	Valery Batura; Oleksandr Honchenkov; Dmitry Nelyubin; Roman Saprykin; Nikolay Kuznetsov	Unified Team	4:19.343	55.525 km/h	Q	
7	Gary Anderson; Nigel Donnelly; Carlos Marryatt; Stuart Williams; Glenn McLeay	New Zealand	4:21.145	55.141 km/h	Q	
8	Svatopluk Buchta; Rudolf Juřícký; Jan Panáček; Pavel Tesař	Czechoslovakia	4:21.687	55.027 km/h	Q	
9	Chris Coletta; Dirk Copeland; Matthew Hamon; Jim Pollak	United States	4:22.963	54.760 km/h		
10	Adolfo Alperi; Gabriel Aynat; Jonathan Garrido; Santos González	Spain	4:23.013	54.750 km/h		
11	Hervé Dagorné; Philippe Ermenault; Daniel Pandèle; Pascal Potié	France	4:23.924	54.561 km/h		
12	Niels van der Steen; Gerben Broeren; Erik Cent; Servais Knaven	Netherlands	4:25.693	54.197 km/h		
13	Conrado Cabrera; Eugenio Castro; Noël de la Cruz; Raúl Domínguez	Cuba	4:27.060	53.920 km/h		
14	Ji Seung-hwan; Kim Yong-gyu; Park Min-su; Won Chang-yong	South Korea	4:27.706	53.790 km/h		
15	Yasuhiro Ando; Masamitsu Ehara; Naokiyo Hashisako; Makio Madarame	Japan	4:32.484	52.847 km/h		
16	Arturo García; César Muciño; Jesús Vázquez; Marco Zaragoza	Mexico	4:32.834	52.779 km/h		
17	Ángel Colla; Gustavo Guglielmone; Carlos Pérez; Fabio Placanica	Argentina	33.860	52.581 km/h		
18	Esteban López; Fernando Sierra; Alberny Vargas; José Velásquez	Colombia	4:36.086	52.157 km/h		
19	Nima Ebrahim; Mehrdad Afsharian Tarshiz; Mohamed Reza Banna; Majid Naseri	Iran	4:45.745	50.394 km/h		
20	Jazy Garcia; Manuel García; Andrew Martin; Martin Santos	Guam	5:23.366	44.531 km/h		
-	Grzegorz Krejner; Marek Leśniewski; Wojciech Pawłak; Dariusz Baranowski	Poland	DNS			

== Quarter-finals ==
Held July 30
In the first round of actual match competition, teams were seeded into matches based on their times from the qualifying round. The winners of the four heats advanced to the semi-finals.

Heat 1

Pos.	Team	NOC	Time	Ave. Speed	Qual.
1	Denmark	Denmark	4:12.270	57.081 km/h	Q
2	Great Britain	Great Britain	4:14.350	56.614 km/h	

Heat 2

Pos.	Team	NOC	Time	Ave. Speed	Qual.
1	Italy	Italy	4:15.440	56.373 km/h	Q
2	Unified Team	Unified Team	4:16.685	56.099 km/h	

Heat 3

Pos.	Team	NOC	Time	Ave. Speed	Qual.
1	Germany	Germany	4:10.980	57.375 km/h	Q
2	New Zealand	New Zealand	overtaken		

Heat 4

Pos.	Team	NOC	Time	Ave. Speed	Qual.	Notes
1	Australia	Australia	4:10.438	57.499 km/h	Q	WR
2	Czechoslovakia	Czechoslovakia	overtaken			

== Semi-finals ==
Held July 31
The winner of the two heats advance to the finals, for the gold medal. The loser with the fastest semi-final time wins the bronze.

Heat 1

Pos.	Team	NOC	Time	Ave. Speed	Qual.
1	Germany	Germany	4:10.446	57.497 km/h	Q
2	Denmark	Denmark	4:15.860	56.280 km/h	

Heat 2

Pos.	Team	NOC	Time	Ave. Speed	Qual.
1	Australia	Australia	4:15.705	56.314 km/h	Q
2	Italy	Italy	4:18.291	55.751 km/h	

== Final ==
Held July 31

Pos.	Team	NOC	Time	Ave. Speed	Notes
1	Germany	Germany	4:08.791	57.879 km/h	WR
2	Australia	Australia	4:10.218	57.549 km/h	

=== Final classification ===
	Final results	
Pos.	Team	NOC
1.	Germany	Germany
2.	Australia	Australia
3.	Denmark	Denmark
4.	Italy	Italy
5.	Great Britain	Great Britain
6.	Unified Team	Unified Team
7.	New Zealand	New Zealand
8.	Czechoslovakia	Czechoslovakia
