= 1990 UCI Track Cycling World Championships =

Cycling world championships

- Venue: Maebashi, Japan
- Date: August 1990
- Velodrome: Green Dome Maebashi
- Nations participating: 53
- Events: 15

The 1990 UCI Track Cycling World Championships were the World Championship for track cycling. They took place in Maebashi, Japan in August 1990. Fifteen events were contested, 12 for men (5 for professionals, 7 for amateurs) and 3 for women.

In the same period, the 1990 UCI Road World Championships were organised in Utsunomiya, Japan.

== Medal summary ==
Event	Gold	Silver	Bronze
Men's Professional Events
Men's sprint	Michael Hübner; East Germany	Claudio Golinelli; Italy	Stephen Pate; Australia
Men's keirin	Michael Hübner; East Germany	Michel Vaarten; Belgium	Claudio Golinelli; Italy
Men's points race	Laurent Biondi; France	Michael Marcussen; Denmark	Danny Clark; Australia
Men's individual pursuit	Viatcheslav Ekimov; Soviet Union	Francis Moreau; France	Armand de Las Cuevas; France
Men's motor-paced	Walter Brugna; Italy	Peter Steiger; Switzerland	Danny Clark; Australia
Men's Amateur Events
Men's sprint	Bill Huck; East Germany	Curtis Harnett; Canada	Jens Fiedler; East Germany
Men's 1 km time trial	Alexandre Kiritchenko; Soviet Union	Martin Vinnicombe; Australia	Jens Glücklich; East Germany
Men's points race	Stephen McGlede; Australia	Bruno Risi; Switzerland	Jan Bo Petersen; Denmark
Men's individual pursuit	Evgueni Berzin; Soviet Union	Valery Batura; Soviet Union	Mike McCarthy; United States
Men's team pursuit	Soviet Union; Valery Batura; Evgueni Berzin; Dmitri Nelyubin; Alexander Gontchenkov	West Germany; Michael Glöckner; Stefan Steinweg; Erik Weispfennig; Andreas Walzer	Australia; Brett Aitken; Stephen McGlede; Darren Winter; Mark Kingsland
Men's tandem	Italy; Gianluca Capitano; Federico Paris	Japan; Norihira Inamura; Masaru Saito	West Germany; Uwe Butchmann; Markus Nagel
Men's motor-paced	Roland Königshofer; Austria	David Solari; Italy	Andrea Bellati; Switzerland
Women's Events
Women's sprint	Connie Paraskevin-Young; United States	Renee Duprel; United States	Rita Razmaite; Soviet Union
Women's points race	Karen Holliday; New Zealand	Svetlana Samokhvalova; Soviet Union	Kristel Werckx; Belgium
Women's individual pursuit	Leontien van Moorsel; Netherlands	Madonna Harris; New Zealand	Barbara Ganz; Switzerland

== Medal table ==
Rank	Nation	Gold	Silver	Bronze	Total
1	Soviet Union (URS)	4	2	1	7
2	East Germany (GDR)	3	0	2	5
3	Italy (ITA)	2	2	1	5
4	Australia (AUS)	1	1	4	6
5	France (FRA)	1	1	1	3
5	United States (USA)	1	1	1	3
7	New Zealand (NZL)	1	1	0	2
8	Austria (AUT)	1	0	0	1
8	Netherlands (NED)	1	0	0	1
10	Switzerland (SUI)	0	2	2	4
11	Belgium (BEL)	0	1	1	2
11	Denmark (DEN)	0	1	1	2
11	West Germany (FRG)	0	1	1	2
14	Canada (CAN)	0	1	0	1
14	Japan (JPN)	0	1	0	1
Totals (15 entries)		15	15	15	45
