= 1991 UCI Track Cycling World Championships =

Cycling world championships

- Venue: Stuttgart, Germany
- Date: 13–18 August 1991
- Velodrome: Hanns-Martin-Schleyer-Halle
- Nations participating: 53
- Events: 15

The 1991 UCI Track Cycling World Championships were the World Championship for track cycling. They took place in Stuttgart, Germany from 13 to 18 August 1991. Fifteen events were contested, 12 for men (5 for professionals, 7 for amateurs) and 3 for women.

In the same period, the 1991 UCI Road World Championships were also organised in Stuttgart.

== Medal summary ==
Event	Gold	Silver	Bronze
Men's Professional Events
Men's sprint	Not awarded	Fabrice Colas; France	Not awarded
Men's keirin	Michael Hübner; Germany	Claudio Golinelli; Italy	Fabrice Colas; France
Men's points race	Viatcheslav Ekimov; Soviet Union	Francis Moreau; France	Peter Pieters; Netherlands
Men's individual pursuit	Francis Moreau; France	Shaun Wallace; Great Britain	Colin Sturgess; Great Britain
Men's motor-paced	Danny Clark; Australia	Peter Steiger; Switzerland	Arno Küttel; Switzerland
Men's Amateur Events
Men's sprint	Jens Fiedler; Germany	Bill Huck; Germany	Gary Neiwand; Australia
Men's 1 km time trial	José Moreno; Spain	Jens Glücklich; Germany	Gene Samuel; Trinidad and Tobago
Men's points race	Bruno Risi; Switzerland	Stephen McGlede; Australia	Jan Bo Petersen; Denmark
Men's individual pursuit	Jens Lehmann; Germany	Michael Glöckner; Germany	Jan Bo Petersen; Denmark
Men's team pursuit	Germany; Michael Glöckner; Stefan Steinweg; Jens Lehmann; Andreas Walzer	Soviet Union; Evgueni Berzin; Vladislav Bobrik; Vadim Kravchenko; Dmitri Nelyubin	Australia; Brett Aitken; Stephen McGlede; Shaun O'Brien; Stuart O'Grady
Men's tandem	Germany; Emanuel Raasch; Eyk Pokorny	Czechoslovakia; Lubomír Hargaš; Pavel Buráň	France; Frédéric Lancien; Denis Lemyre
Men's motor-paced	Roland Königshofer; Austria	David Solari; Italy	Carsten Podlesch; Germany
Women's events
Women's sprint	Ingrid Haringa; Netherlands	Annett Neumann; Germany	Connie Paraskevin-Young; United States
Women's points race	Ingrid Haringa; Netherlands	Kristel Werckx; Belgium	Janie Eickhoff; United States
Women's individual pursuit	Petra Rossner; Germany	Janie Eickhoff; United States	Marion Clignet; France

== Medal table ==
Rank	Nation	Gold	Silver	Bronze	Total
1	Germany (GER)	6	4	1	11
2	Netherlands (NED)	2	0	1	3
3	France (FRA)	1	2	3	6
4	Australia (AUS)	1	1	2	4
5	Switzerland (SUI)	1	1	1	3
6	Soviet Union (URS)	1	1	0	2
7	Austria (AUT)	1	0	0	1
7	Spain (ESP)	1	0	0	1
9	Italy (ITA)	0	2	0	2
10	United States (USA)	0	1	2	3
11	Great Britain (GBR)	0	1	1	2
12	Belgium (BEL)	0	1	0	1
12	Czechoslovakia (TCH)	0	1	0	1
14	Denmark (DEN)	0	0	2	2
15	Trinidad and Tobago (TRI)	0	0	1	1
Totals (15 entries)		14	15	14	43

== See also ==
- 1991 UCI Road World Championships
