= Cycling at the 1992 Summer Olympics – Men's individual pursuit =

These are the official results of the Men's Individual Pursuit at the 1992 Summer Olympics in Barcelona, Spain. The races were held on Monday, July 27, and Wednesday, July 29, 1992, at the Velòdrom d'Horta, with a race distance of 4 km. The Gold medal was won by Briton Chris Boardman, riding the Lotus 108 "superbike", who caught German Jens Lehmann in the final and won Britain's first cycling gold medal in 72 years.

== Medalists ==
Gold:	Silver:	Bronze:
Chris Boardman (GBR)	Jens Lehmann (GER)	Gary Anderson (NZL)

== Results ==
- Q Qualified for next round.
- q Qualified for classification round.
- overtaken Overtaken by opponent during heat.
- cap captured opponent.
- DNS Did not start.
- WR New world record.

=== Qualifying round ===
Held, July 27

The thirty riders raced against each other in matches of two. Qualification for the next round was not based on who won those matches, however. The cyclists with the sixteen fastest times advanced, regardless of whether they won or lost their match. Fastest eight times advanced to Group A quarter-finals. Places nine through sixteen advanced to Group B classification matches.

Pos.	Athlete	NOC	Time	Ave. Speed	Qual.	Notes
1	Chris Boardman	Great Britain	4:27.357	53.860 km/h	Q	WR
2	Jens Lehmann	Germany	4:30.054	53.322 km/h	Q	
3	Mark Kingsland	Australia	4:31.033	53.30 km/h	Q	
4	Gary Anderson	New Zealand	4:32.253	52.891 km/h	Q	
5	Philippe Ermenault	France	4:33.892	52.575 km/h	Q	
6	Carl Sundquist	United States	4:34.390	52.480 km/h	Q	
7	Oleksandr Honchenkov	Unified Team	4:35.057	52.352 km/h	Q	
8	Jan Petersen	Denmark	4:35.904	52.192 km/h	Q	
9	Cédric Mathy	Belgium	4:37.288	51.931 km/h	q	
10	Ivan Beltrami	Italy	4:39.645	51.493 km/h	q	
11	Robert Karśnicki	Poland	4:39.836	51.458 km/h	q	
12	Servais Knaven	Netherlands	4:40.436	51.348 km/h	q	
13	Michal Baldrián	Czechoslovakia	4:41.724	51.113 km/h	q	
14	Adolfo Alperi	Spain	4:42.538	50.996 km/h	q	
15	Michael Belcourt	Canada	4:43.135	50.859 km/h	q	
16	Masamitsu Ehara	Japan	4:44.412	50.630 km/h	q	
17	Viktor Kunz	Switzerland	4:45.539	50.430 km/h		
18	Georgios Portelanos	Greece	4:46.345	50.288 km/h		
19	Patrick Matt	Liechtenstein	4:46.982	50.117 km/h		
20	Alberny Vargas	Colombia	4:49.067	49.815 km/h		
21	Tony Ledgard	Peru	4:49.626	49.719 km/h		
22	Murugayan Kumaresan	Malaysia	4:59.049	48.152 km/h		
23	Weng Yu-yi	Chinese Taipei	5:00.519	47.917 km/h		
24	Manuel García	Guam	5:03.997	47.368 km/h		
25	Mehrdad Afsharian Tarshiz	Iran	5:08.184	46.725 km/h		
-	Hernán López	Argentina	overtaken			
-	Steffen Kjærgaard	Norway	overtaken			
-	Malcolm Lange	South Africa	overtaken			
-	Robert Peters	Antigua and Barbuda	overtaken			
-	Raúl Domínguez	Cuba	DNS			

== Quarter-finals ==
Held July 28
In the first round of actual match competition, cyclists were seeded into matches based on their times from the qualifying round. The winners of the four heats of Group A advanced to the semi-finals. Group B and the losers of heats in Group A were seeded.

=== Group B ===
Heat 1

Pos.	Athlete	NOC	Time	Ave. Speed
1	Servais Knaven	Netherlands	4:36.541	
2	Michal Baldrián	Czechoslovakia	4:39.625	

Heat 2

Pos.	Athlete	NOC	Time	Ave. Speed
1	Adolfo Alperi	Spain	4:34.760	52.409 km/h
2	Robert Karśnicki	Poland	4:35.184	52.328 km/h

Heat 3

Pos.	Athlete	NOC	Time	Ave. Speed
1	Ivan Beltrami	Italy	4:36.150	52.145 km/h
2	Michael Belcourt	Canada	4:42.441	50.984 km/h

Heat 4

Pos.	Athlete	NOC	Time	Ave. Speed
1	Cédric Mathy	Belgium	4:33.942	52.565 km/h
2	Masamitsu Ehara	Japan	4:41.287	51.193 km/h

=== Group A ===
Heat 1

Pos.	Athlete	NOC	Time	Ave. Speed	Qual.
1	Gary Anderson	New Zealand	4:27.954	53.740 km/h	Q
2	Philippe Ermenault	France	4:28.838	51.113 km/h	

Heat 2

Pos.	Athlete	NOC	Time	Ave. Speed	Qual.
1	Mark Kingsland	Australia	4:29.173	53.497 km/h	Q
2	Carl Sundquist	United States	ovtk		

Heat 3

Pos.	Athlete	NOC	Time	Ave. Speed	Qual.
1	Jens Lehmann	Germany	4:27.715	53.788 km/h	Q
2	Oleksandr Honchenkov	Unified Team	ovtk		

Heat 4

Pos.	Athlete	NOC	Time	Ave. Speed	Qual.	Notes
1	Chris Boardman	Great Britain	4:24.496	54.443 km/h	Q	WR
2	Jan Petersen	Denmark	ovtk			

== Semi-finals ==
Held July 29
The winner of the two heats advance to the finals, for the gold medal. The loser with the fastest semi-final time wins the bronze.

Heat 1

Pos.	Athlete	NOC	Time	Ave. Speed	Qual.
1	Jens Lehmann	Germany	4:27.230	53.886 km/h	Q
2	Gary Anderson	New Zealand	4:31.061	53.124 km/h	

Heat 2

Pos.	Athlete	NOC	Time	Ave. Speed	Qual.
1	Chris Boardman	Great Britain	4:29.332	53.465 km/h	Q
2	Mark Kingsland	Australia	4:32.716	52.802 km/h	

== Final ==
Held July 29

Pos.	Athlete	NOC	Time	Ave. Speed
1	Chris Boardman	Great Britain	cap	48.160 km/h
2	Jens Lehman	Germany	ovtk	

=== Final classification ===
	Final results	
Pos.	Athlete	NOC
1.	Chris Boardman	Great Britain
2.	Jens Lehman	Germany
3.	Gary Anderson	New Zealand
4.	Mark Kingsland	Australia
5.	Philippe Ermenault	France
6.	Cédric Mathy	Belgium
7.	Adolfo Alperi	Spain
8.	Ivan Beltrami	Italy
9.	Servais Knaven	Netherlands
10.	Jan Petersen	Denmark
11.	Oleksandr Honchenkov	Unified Team
12.	Carl Sundquist	United States
13.	Robert Karśnicki	Poland
14.	Michal Baldrián	Czechoslovakia
15.	Masamitsu Ehara	Japan
16.	Michael Belcourt	Canada
