= Tour de Berlin =

German multi-day road cycling race

Race details
- Date: May
- Region: Berlin, Germany
- Discipline: Road race
- Competition: UCI Europe Tour
- Type: Stage race
- Web site: tour-de-berlin.de

History
- First edition: 1953
- Editions: 64
- Final edition: 2016
- First winner: Willy Irrgang (RFA)
- Most wins: Burkhard Ebert (RFA) (4 wins)
- Final winner: Rémi Cavagna (FRA)

The Tour de Berlin was a road bicycle race held annually between 1953 and 2016 in Germany. From 2007 to its demise, the race was organised as a 2.2U event on the UCI Europe Tour, meaning it was reserved for under-23 riders.

== Winners ==
Year	Winner	Second	Third
1953	(West Germany) Willy Irrgang	(Sweden) Yngve Lundh	(West Germany) Albert Mussfeld
1954	(West Germany) Wolfgang Grupe	(West Germany) Willy Irrgang	(West Germany) Heinz Moltje
1955	(West Germany) Paul Maue	(West Germany) Edi Ziegler	(West Germany) Willy Irrgang
1956	(Sweden) Herbert Dahlbom	(West Germany) Edi Ziegler	(Belgium) Jos Hoevenaers
1957	(Belgium) Frans Aerenhouts	(West Germany) Hans Matern	(Poland) Eligiusz Grabowski
1958	(Belgium) Emile Daems	(Belgium) Albert Debremaeker	(West Germany) Otto Altweck
1959	(Belgium) Hugo Verlinden	(Switzerland) Hans Schleuniger	(West Germany) Horst Schellhammer
1960	(West Germany) Dieter Puschel	(Belgium) Marcel Van Den Bogaert	(West Germany) Heinz Barth
1961	(Belgium) Roger De Breuker	(West Germany) Karl Raab	(Netherlands) Cees Dieperink
1962	(Belgium) Georges Vandenberghe	(Sweden) Owe Adamson	(West Germany) Burkhard Ebert
1963	(West Germany) Heinz Rüschoff	(Austria) Hans Furian	(West Germany) Siegfried Koch
1964	(West Germany) Paul Horn	(West Germany) Peter Glemser	(Belgium) Roger Swerts
1965	(West Germany) Lutz Löschke	(West Germany) Ortwin Czarnowski	(Switzerland) André Rosseel
1966	(West Germany) Burkhard Ebert	(West Germany) Manfred Mücke	(West Germany) Ludwig Troche
1967	(West Germany) Burkhard Ebert	(Sweden) Gösta Pettersson	(West Germany) Manfred Mücke
1968	(West Germany) Ortwin Czarnowski	(West Germany) Burkhard Ebert	(Denmark) Mogens Frey
1969	(West Germany) Burkhard Ebert	(West Germany) Klaus Simon	(West Germany) Hanno Podbielski
1970	(Denmark) Verner Blaudzun	(Denmark) Bill Sejer Nielsen	(Sweden) Sven-Åke Nilsson
1971	(West Germany) Burkhard Ebert	(Denmark) Jørgen Emil Hansen	(Norway) Magne Orre
1972	(West Germany) Erwin Tischler	(Sweden) Leif Hansson	(Sweden) Sven-Åke Nilsson
1973	(West Germany) Andreas Troche	(West Germany) Burckhard Bremer	(West Germany) Erwin Derlick
1974	(Norway) Thorleif Andresen	(West Germany) Wilfried Trott	(Norway) Tom Martin Biseth
1975	(West Germany) Jürgen Kraft	(Finland) Harry Hannus	(West Germany) Rainer Podlesch
1976	(West Germany) Hans Michalsky	(Switzerland) Hans Aemisegger	(Belgium) Rudy Pevenage
1977	(West Germany) Rainer Podlesch	(West Germany) Olaf Paltian	(Finland) Harry Hannus
1978	(West Germany) Volker Kasun	(Denmark) Henning Jørgensen	(Netherlands) Wim van Steenis
1979	(Norway) Morten Sæther	(Norway) Dag Erik Pedersen	(Norway) Ole Kristian Silseth
1980	(Finland) Harry Hannus	(West Germany) Olaf Paltian	(West Germany) Peter Becker
1981	(West Germany) Michael Marx	(West Germany) Peter Becker	(Finland) Sixten Wackström
1982	(West Germany) Peter Becker	(West Germany) Rainer Podlesch	(West Germany) Frank Plambeck
1983	(Norway) Morten Sæther	(Finland) Kari Myyryläinen	(Switzerland) Laurent Vial
1984	(Denmark) Kim Eriksen	(Denmark) John Carlsen	(Denmark) Jesper Skibby
1985	(United States) Jeff Pierce	(United States) Clarence Knickman	(Germany) Marek Kuleszak
1986	(West Germany) Remig Stumpf	(Finland) Kari Myyryläinen	(West Germany) Hartmut Bölts
1987	(West Germany) Roland Günther	(West Germany) Frank Plambeck	(Denmark) Peter Meinert Nielsen
1988	(Netherlands) Eric Cent	(West Germany) Frank Plambeck	(West Germany) Thomas Dürst
1989	(Italy) Giovanni Lombardi	(West Germany) Sigi Hobel	(West Germany) Ed Kaczmarczyk
1990	(Netherlands) Leo Peelen	(Italy) Giovanni Lombardi	(Germany) Rolf Aldag
1991	(Germany) Steffen Wesemann	(Denmark) Dan Frost	(Denmark) Jan Bo Petersen
1992	(Denmark) Jan Bo Petersen	(Czech Republic) Pavel Padrnos	(Germany) Uwe Berndt
1993	(Germany) Ralf Schmidt	(Germany) Torsten Schmidt	(Sweden) Glenn Magnusson
1994	(Lithuania) Remigijus Lupeikis	(Germany) Andreas Bach	(Germany) Ralf Koldewitz
1995	(Denmark) Jan Bo Petersen	(Germany) Ralf Koldewitz	(Germany) Andreas Walzer
1996	(Germany) Guido Fulst	(Germany) André Kalfack	(Germany) Robert Bartko
1997	(Sweden) Jan Karlsson	(Germany) Sven Steiner	(Denmark) Tayeb Braikia
1998	(Italy) Giorgio Bosisio	(Germany) Stan Marschinke	(Germany) Enrico Poitschke
1999	(Germany) Lars Schröder	(Italy) Paolo Ardizzi	(Germany) Björn Schröder
2000	(Poland) Bernhard Bocian	(Poland) Gregorz Rosolinski	(Poland) Zbigniew Wyrzykowski
2001	(Germany) Andreas Günther	(Germany) Markus Fothen	(Germany) Björn Schröder
2002	(Italy) Devid Garbelli	(Italy) Mirco Lorenzetto	(Italy) Maurizio Biondo
2003	(Switzerland) Andreas Dietziker	(Russia) Stanislav Belov	(Germany) Christian Knees
2004	(Netherlands) Tom Veelers	(Germany) Andreas Welsch	(Denmark) Kasper Klostergaard Larsen
2005	(Belgium) Dominique Cornu	(Italy) Tiziano Dall'Antonia	(Germany) Christoph Meschenmoser
2006	(Denmark) Alex Rasmussen	(United Kingdom) Mark Cavendish	(Germany) Philipp Seubert
2007	(Germany) Michael Franzl	(Germany) Frank Schulz	(Germany) Jörg Lehmann
2008	(Australia) Travis Meyer	(Austria) Matthias Brändle	(Australia) Matt King
2009	(Germany) Franz Schiewer	(Netherlands) Tom Relou	(Germany) Jakob Steigmiller
2010	(Netherlands) Marc Goos	(Germany) Johannes Kahra	(Germany) Tino Thömel
2011	(Germany) Jasha Sütterlin	(Germany) Thomas Koep	(United Kingdom) Erick Rowsell
2012	(Germany) Nikias Arndt	(Germany) Jan-Niklas Droste	(Netherlands) Stefan Poutsma
2013	(Denmark) Mathias Møller Nielsen	(Netherlands) Sjors Roosen	(Denmark) Lasse Norman Hansen
2014	(Netherlands) Jochem Hoekstra	(Netherlands) Elmar Reinders	(Germany) Nils Politt
2015	(Netherlands) Steven Lammertink	(Germany) Max Walscheid	(Belgium) Aimé De Gendt
2016	(France) Rémi Cavagna	(Germany) Max Schachmann	(Denmark) Kasper Asgreen
