= Colombia at the 1992 Summer Olympics =

- IOC code: COL
- NOC: Colombian Olympic Committee

in Barcelona
- Competitors: 49 (46 men and 3 women) in 11 sports
- Flag bearer: Bernardo Tovar
- Medals Ranked 54th: Gold 0 Silver 0 Bronze 1 Total 1

Summer Olympics appearances (overview)
- 1932; 1936; 1948; 1952; 1956; 1960; 1964; 1968; 1972; 1976; 1980; 1984; 1988; 1992; 1996; 2000; 2004; 2008; 2012; 2016; 2020; 2024; 2028

Colombia competed at the 1992 Summer Olympics in Barcelona, Spain. 49 competitors, 46 men and 3 women, took part in 31 events in 11 sports.

== Medalists ==
| Medal | Name | Sport | Event | Date |
|---|---|---|---|---|
| Bronze | Ximena Restrepo | Athletics | Women's 400 metres | August 5 |

== Competitors ==
The following is the list of number of competitors in the Games.

| Sport | Men | Women | Total |
|---|---|---|---|
| Archery | 0 | 1 | 1 |
| Athletics | 3 | 2 | 5 |
| Boxing | 3 | – | 3 |
| Cycling | 8 | 0 | 8 |
| Equestrian | 3 | 0 | 3 |
| Fencing | 2 | 0 | 2 |
| Football | 19 | – | 19 |
| Shooting | 2 | 0 | 2 |
| Swimming | 1 | 0 | 1 |
| Weightlifting | 4 | – | 4 |
| Wrestling | 1 | – | 1 |
| Total | 46 | 3 | 49 |

== Archery ==
After missing the 1988 archery competition, Colombia returned for its second Olympic tournament in 1992. This time, the nation sent a female archer. She fared no better than Juan Echavarria had eight years earlier.

Women's Individual Competition:

- Maria Echavarria – Ranking Round, 55th place (0-0)

== Athletics ==
Men's 5.000 metres

- Herder Vázquez
  - Heat — 14:06.80 (→ did not advance)

Men's 10.000 metres

- Herder Vázquez
  - Heat — 30:07.55 (→ did not advance)

Men's Marathon

- Carlos Grisales — did not finish (→ no ranking)

Men's 20 km Walk

- Héctor Moreno — 1:26:23 (→ 9th place)

Women's 400 metres

- Ximena Restrepo
- Norfalia Carabalí

== Boxing ==
Men's Light Flyweight (– 48 kg)

- Fernando Retayud
  - First Round — Lost to Erdenentsogt Tsogtjargal (MGL), 2:8

Men's Bantamweight (– 54 kg)

- Jesús Pérez
  - First Round — Lost to Philippe Wartelle (FRA), 5:12

Men's Light-Welterweight (– 63,5 kg)

- Edwin Cassiani
  - First Round — Lost to Héctor Vinent (CUB), 4:27

== Cycling ==
Eight male cyclists represented Colombia in 1992.

Men's road race

- José Robles
- Héctor Palacio
- Libardo Niño

Men's sprint

- Jhon González

Men's 1 km time trial

- José Velásquez

Men's individual pursuit

- Alberny Vargas

Men's team pursuit

- Esteban López
- Fernando Sierra
- Alberny Vargas
- José Velásquez

Men's points race

- José Velásquez

== Equestrianism ==
Mixed Individual Jumping

- Juan Carlos García
- Manuel Guillermo Torres
- Hugo Gamboa

Mixed Team Jumping

- Juan Carlos García
- Manuel Guillermo Torres
- Hugo Gamboa

== Fencing ==
Two male fencers represented Colombia in 1992.

Men's épée

- Mauricio Rivas
- Juan Miguel Paz

== Football ==
=== Men's team competition ===
- Preliminary round (group C)
  - Lost to Spain (0-4)
  - Drew with Qatar (1-1)
  - Lost to Egypt (3-4)
- → Did not advance
- Team Roster
  - ( 1.) Miguel Angel Calero
  - ( 2.) Jorge Bermudez
  - ( 3.) Robeiro Moreno
  - ( 4.) José Santa
  - ( 5.) Victor Hugo Marulanda
  - ( 6.) Hermán Gaviria
  - ( 7.) Faustino Asprilla
  - ( 8.) John Lozano
  - ( 9.) Iván Valenciano
  - (10.) Víctor Pacheco
  - (11.) Carlos Alberto Uribe
  - (12.) Faryd Mondragón
  - (13.) Geovanis Cassiani
  - (14.) John Perez
  - (15.) Víctor Aristizábal
  - (16.) Gustavo Restrepo
  - (17.) John Jairo Mejia
  - (18.) Diego Osorio
  - (19.) Jairo Zulbarán
  - (20.) Omar Cañas
- Head coach: Hernan Dario Gomez

== Shooting ==
Men's Air Pistol, 10 metres

- Bernardo Tovar

Men's Rapid-Fire Pistol, 25 metres

- Bernardo Tovar

Men's Free Pistol, 50 metres

- Bernardo Tovar

Men's Running Target, 10 metres

- Hernando Barrientos

== Swimming ==
Men's 400m Freestyle

- Alejandro Bermúdez
  - Heat — 4:01.66 (→ did not advance, 35th place)

Men's 1500m Freestyle

- Alejandro Bermúdez
  - Heat — 16:01.77 (→ did not advance, 25th place)

Men's 200m Backstroke

- Alejandro Bermúdez
  - Heat — 2:04.46 (→ did not advance, 26th place)

Men's 400m Individual Medley

- Alejandro Bermúdez
  - Heat — 4:33.87 (→ did not advance, 27th place)

== Weightlifting ==
Men's Featherweight

- José Horacio Villegas
- Roger Berrio

Men's Lightweight

- Eyne Acevedo

Men's Middleweight

- Álvaro Velasco

== Wrestling ==
Men's Freestyle Welterweight

- Romelio Salas

== See also ==
- Colombia at the 1991 Pan American Games
- Sports in Colombia
