= Cycling at the 1992 Summer Olympics =

Cycling at the Games of the XXV Olympiad
- Venues: Sant Sadurní d'Anoia; Velòdrom d'Horta
- Date: 26–31 July 1992
- Competitors: 451 from 76 nations

The cycling competitions at the 1992 Olympic Games in Barcelona consisted of two different categories: road cycling and track cycling, with ten events being contested. The road team time trial event took place at the Circuit de Catalunya and the A-17 highway, the individual road races were held in Sant Sadurní d'Anoia, and track cycling took place at the Velòdrom d'Horta.

== Road cycling ==
=== Men's ===
Games	Gold	Silver	Bronze
Road race	Fabio Casartelli; Italy	Erik Dekker; Netherlands	Dainis Ozols; Latvia
Team time trial	Germany; Michael Rich; Bernd Dittert; Christian Meyer; Uwe Peschel	Italy; Andrea Peron; Flavio Anastasia; Luca Colombo; Gianfranco Contri	France; Jean-Louis Harel; Hervé Boussard; Didier Faivre-Pierret; Philippe Gaumont

=== Women's ===
Games	Gold	Silver	Bronze
Road race	Kathryn Watt; Australia	Jeannie Longo-Ciprelli; France	Monique Knol; Netherlands

== Track cycling ==
=== Men's ===
Games	Gold	Silver	Bronze
Points race	Giovanni Lombardi; Italy	Léon van Bon; Netherlands	Cédric Mathy; Belgium
Individual pursuit	Chris Boardman; Great Britain	Jens Lehmann; Germany	Gary Anderson; New Zealand
Team pursuit	Germany; Stefan Steinweg; Andreas Walzer; Guido Fulst; Michael Glöckner; Jens Lehmann	Australia; Stuart O'Grady; Brett Aitken; Stephen McGlede; Shaun O'Brien	Denmark; Jan Petersen; Michael Sandstød; Ken Frost; Jimmi Madsen; Klaus Kynde Nielsen
Sprint	Jens Fiedler; Germany	Gary Neiwand; Australia	Curtis Harnett; Canada
1 km time trial	José Manuel Moreno; Spain	Shane Kelly; Australia	Erin Hartwell; United States

=== Women's ===
Games	Gold	Silver	Bronze
Pursuit	Petra Roßner; Germany	Kathryn Watt; Australia	Rebecca Twigg; United States
Sprint	Erika Salumäe; Estonia	Annett Neumann; Germany	Ingrid Haringa; Netherlands

== Medal table ==
Rank	Nation	Gold	Silver	Bronze	Total
1	Germany	4	2	0	6
2	Italy	2	1	0	3
3	Australia	1	4	0	5
4	Estonia	1	0	0	1
4	Great Britain	1	0	0	1
4	Spain	1	0	0	1
7	Netherlands	0	2	2	4
8	France	0	1	1	2
9	United States	0	0	2	2
10	Belgium	0	0	1	1
10	Canada	0	0	1	1
10	Denmark	0	0	1	1
10	Latvia	0	0	1	1
10	New Zealand	0	0	1	1
Totals (14 entries)		10	10	10	30

== Participating nations ==
451 cyclists from 76 nations competed.

- Andorra (3)
- Antigua and Barbuda (3)
- Aruba (2)
- Argentina (8)
- Australia (16)
- Austria (5)
- Barbados (1)
- Bahrain (4)
- Belgium (7)
- Belize (5)
- Benin (2)
- Bolivia (1)
- Brazil (7)
- Bulgaria (1)
- Canada (15)
- Cayman Islands (6)
- Central African Republic (4)
- Chile (1)
- China (6)

- Chinese Taipei (1)
- Colombia (8)
- Zaire (3)
- Cuba (4)
- Czechoslovakia (12)
- Denmark (11)
- Ecuador (2)
- Estonia (3)
- Ethiopia (5)
- Finland (2)
- France (18)
- Germany (17)
- Great Britain (16)
- Greece (1)
- Guam (6)
- Guyana (1)
- Hungary (4)
- Indonesia (2)
- Independent Olympic Athletes (5)

- Iran (7)
- Ireland (5)
- Italy (18)
- Jamaica (3)
- Japan (12)
- Latvia (5)
- Lebanon (2)
- Liechtenstein (2)
- Lithuania (5)
- Malaysia (1)
- Mexico (5)
- Mongolia (4)
- Netherlands (17)
- New Zealand (14)
- Nicaragua (1)
- North Korea (3)
- Norway (9)
- Peru (1)
- Philippines (2)

- Poland (9)
- Rwanda (3)
- San Marino (1)
- Saudi Arabia (3)
- Slovenia (1)
- South Africa (5)
- Spain (14)
- Suriname (1)
- South Korea (4)
- Sweden (9)
- Switzerland (13)
- Togo (2)
- Trinidad and Tobago (2)
- Unified Team (19)
- United Arab Emirates (4)
- United States (20)
- Virgin Islands (1)
- Uruguay (2)
- Venezuela (4)

== Broken records ==
Event	Name	Nation	Score	Date	Record
Men's flying 200 m time trial	Jens Fiedler	Germany	10"252	28 July	OR
Men's individual pursuit	Chris Boardman	Great Britain	4'27"357	27 July	WR, OR
Men's individual pursuit	Chris Boardman	Great Britain	4'24"496	28 July	WR, OR
Men's team pursuit	Brett Aitken; Stephen McGlede; Shaun O’Brien; Stuart O'Grady	Australia	4'11"245	30 July	WR, OR
Men's team pursuit	Brett Aitken; Stephen McGlede; Shaun O’Brien; Stuart O'Grady	Australia	4'10"438	30 July	WR, OR
Men's team pursuit	Michael Glockner; Jens Lehmann; Stefan Steinweg; Guido Fulst	Germany	4'08"791	31 July	WR, OR
Women's individual pursuit	Kathy Watt	Australia	3'41"886	30 July	OR
Women's individual pursuit	Petra Rossner	Germany	3'41"509	30 July	OR

OR = Olympic record, WR = World record
