= Carlos Marryatt =

New Zealand cyclist

Personal information
- Born: 11 October 1968 (age 58) Christchurch, New Zealand

Cycling career
- Sport: Cycling

Carlos Marryatt (born 11 October 1968) is a New Zealand cyclist. He competed in the team pursuit at the 1992 Summer Olympics.

== Sporting career ==
Marryatt competed in track cycling and represented New Zealand at the 1992 Summer Olympics in Barcelona. In the 4,000-metre team pursuit, the New Zealand team of Gary Anderson, Nigel Donnelly, Carlos Marryatt, Stuart Williams, and Glenn McLeay finished seventh.
