= World record progression track cycling – Men's team pursuit =

This is an overview of the progression of the world track cycling record of the men's 4 km team pursuit as recognised by the Union Cycliste Internationale.

== Progression ==
=== Amateurs (1986–1989) ===
Time	Cyclist	Velodrome, location	Track	Date	Ref
4:24.91	Italy	Milan (ITA), Palais Des Sports	Indoor	9 July 1976	
4:23.07	Switzerland	Zürich (SUI), Hallenstadion	Indoor	9 July 1979	
4:22.109	Soviet Union	Moscow (URS)	Indoor	23 May 1980	
4:19.45	Soviet Union	Moscow (URS)	Indoor	12 June 1980	
4:16.62	Soviet Union	Moscow (URS)	Indoor	25 July 1980	
4:16.609	Soviet Union	Moscow (URS)	Indoor	4 August 1984	
4:14.264	Soviet Union	Moscow (URS)	Indoor	21 August 1984	
4:12.830	Soviet Union	Moscow (URS)	Indoor	9 July 1986	
4:17.710	Czechoslovakia	Colorado Springs (USA)	Open air	30 August 1986	
4:11.301	Soviet Union	Moscow (URS)	Indoor	15 August 1987	
4:16.10	Soviet Union	Olympic Velodrome, Seoul (KOR)	Open air	23 September 1988	
4:10.877	Soviet Union	Moscow (URS)	Indoor	4 August 1989	
4:08.064	Germany; Michael Gloeckner; Jens Lehmann; Stefan Steinweg; Andreas Walzer	Stuttgart (GER)	Indoor	16 August 1991	
4:10.438	Australia	Velòdrom d'Horta, Barcelona (ESP)	Open air	30 July 1992	
4:08.791	Germany; Michael Gloeckner; Jens Lehmann; Stefan Steinweg; Guido Fulst	Velòdrom d'Horta, Barcelona (ESP)	Open air	31 July 1992	

=== Open (1993–) ===
Time	Cyclist	Velodrome, location	Track	Date	Meeting	Ref
4:03.840	Australia; Brett Aitken; Stuart O'Grady; Tim O'Shanessy; Billy Joe Shearsby	Hamar (NOR)	Indoor	20 August 1993		
4:00.958	Italy; Adler Capelli; Cristiano Citton; Andrea Collinelli; Mauro Trentini	Manchester (GBR)	Indoor	31 August 1996		
4:00.830	Ukraine; Oleksandr Fedenko; Oleksandr Symonenko; Sergiy Matveyev; Sergiy Chernyavskyy	Sydney (AUS)	Indoor	19 September 2000	2000 Olympics	
3:59.710	Germany; Guido Fulst; Robert Bartko; Daniel Becke; Jens Lehmann	Sydney (AUS)	Indoor	19 September 2000	2000 Olympics	
3:59.583	Australia; Luke Roberts; Mark Renshaw; Peter Dawson; Graeme Brown	Manchester (GBR)	Indoor	1 August 2002	2002 Commonwealth Games	
3:57.280	Australia; Luke Roberts; Brett Lancaster; Peter Dawson; Graeme Brown	Stuttgart (GER)	Indoor	2 August 2003	2003 UCI Track Cycling World Championships	
3:56.610	Australia; Luke Roberts; Brett Lancaster; Brad Mcgee; Graeme Brown	Athens (GRE)	Indoor	22 August 2004	2004 Olympics	
3:56.322	Great Britain; Edward Clancy; Geraint Thomas; Paul Manning; Bradley Wiggins	Manchester (GBR)	Indoor	27 March 2008	2008 World Championships	
3:55.202	Great Britain; Edward Clancy; Paul Manning; Geraint Thomas; Bradley Wiggins	Laoshan, Beijing (CHN)	Indoor	17 August 2008	2008 Olympics	
3:53.314	Great Britain; Edward Clancy; Paul Manning; Geraint Thomas; Bradley Wiggins	Laoshan. Beijing (CHN)	Indoor	18 August 2008	2008 Olympics	
3:53.295	Great Britain; Edward Clancy; Peter Kennaugh; Steven Burke; Geraint Thomas	Hisense Arena, Melbourne (AUS)	Indoor	4 April 2012	2012 World Championships	
3:51.659	Great Britain; Edward Clancy; Peter Kennaugh; Steven Burke; Geraint Thomas	London (GBR)	Indoor	3 August 2012	2012 Olympics	
3:50.570	Great Britain; Edward Clancy; Owain Doull; Steven Burke; Bradley Wiggins	Rio de Janeiro (BRA)	Indoor	12 August 2016	2016 Olympics	
3:50.265	Great Britain; Edward Clancy; Owain Doull; Steven Burke; Bradley Wiggins	Rio de Janeiro (BRA)	Indoor	12 August 2016	2016 Olympics	
3:49.804	Australia; Leigh Howard; Sam Welsford; Kelland O'Brien; Alex Porter	Anna Meares Velodrome, Brisbane (AUS)	Indoor	5 April 2018	2018 Commonwealth Games	
3:48.012	Australia; Sam Welsford; Kelland O'Brien; Leigh Howard; Alex Porter	Pruszków (POL)	Indoor	28 February 2019	2019 World Championships	
3:46.579	Denmark; Lasse Norman Hansen; Julius Johansen; Frederik Rodenberg; Rasmus Pedersen	Berlin (GER)	Indoor	26 February 2020	2020 World Championships	
3:46.203	Denmark; Lasse Norman Hansen; Julius Johansen; Frederik Rodenberg; Rasmus Pedersen	Berlin (GER)	Indoor	26 February 2020	2020 World Championships	
3:44.672	Denmark; Lasse Norman Hansen; Julius Johansen; Frederik Rodenberg; Rasmus Pedersen	Berlin (GER)	Indoor	27 February 2020	2020 World Championships	
3:42.307	Italy; Simone Consonni; Filippo Ganna; Francesco Lamon; Jonathan Milan	Izu Velodrome, Izu (JPN)	Indoor	3 August 2021	2020 Olympics	
3:42.032	Italy; Simone Consonni; Filippo Ganna; Francesco Lamon; Jonathan Milan	Izu Velodrome, Izu (JPN)	Indoor	4 August 2021	2020 Olympics	
3:40.730	Australia; Oliver Bleddyn; Sam Welsford; Conor Leahy; Kelland O'Brien	Saint-Quentin-En-Yvelines Velodrome (FRA)	Indoor	6 August 2024	2024 Olympics	
3:39.977	Denmark; Lasse Norman Leth; Frederik Rodenberg; Rasmus Pedersen; Tobias Hansen	Konya Velodrome, Konya (TUR)	Indoor	2 February 2026	2026 European Championships	
