= 1993 UCI Track Cycling World Championships =

Cycling world championships

- Venue: Hamar, Norway
- Date: 17–29 August 1993
- Velodrome: Vikingskipet
- Events: 11

The 1993 UCI Track Cycling World Championships were held at Vikingskipet in Hamar, Norway, from 17 to 29 August 1993. Eleven events were held, eight for men and three for women, with five world records being set.

In the same period, the 1993 UCI Road World Championships were organized in Oslo, Norway.

== Venue ==
The Championships were hosted in Vikingskipet, an indoor speed skating rink which opened in 1992 for the 1994 Winter Olympics. Originally the plan had been to construct a velodrome in Oslo, but instead it was decided to erect a temporary track within the Hamar venue. The temporary structure cost NOK 15 million, and was dismantled after the world championships.

== Medal summary ==
Event	Gold	Silver	Bronze
Men's Events
Men's sprint	Gary Neiwand; Australia	Michael Hübner; Germany	Eyk Pokorny; Germany
Men's 1 km time trial	Florian Rousseau; France	Shane Kelly; Australia	Jens Glücklich; Germany
Men's keirin	Gary Neiwand; Australia	Marty Nothstein; United States	Toshimasa Yoshioka; Japan
Men's points race	Etienne De Wilde; Belgium	Éric Magnin; France	Vasyl Yakovlev; Ukraine
Men's individual pursuit	Graeme Obree; Great Britain	Philippe Ermenault; France	Chris Boardman; Great Britain
Men's team pursuit	Australia; Brett Aitken; Stuart O'Grady; Tim O'Shannessey; Billy Shearsby	Germany; Guido Fulst; Jens Lehmann; Andreas Bach; Torsten Schmidt	Denmark; Jimmi Madsen; Klaus Kynde Nielsen; Jan Bo Petersen; Lars Otto Olsen
Men's tandem	Italy; Federico Paris; Roberto Chiappa	Australia; Stephen Pate; Danny Day	Czech Republic; Lubomír Hargaš; Arnošt Drcmánek
Men's motor-paced	Jens Veggerby; Denmark	Roland Königshofer; Austria	Carsten Podlesch; Germany
Women's Events
Women's sprint	Tanya Dubnicoff; Canada	Ingrid Haringa; Netherlands	Nathalie Even; France
Women's points race	Ingrid Haringa; Netherlands	Svetlana Samokhalova; Russia	Jessica Grieco; United States
Women's individual pursuit	Rebecca Twigg; United States	Marion Clignet; France	Janie Eickhoff; United States

== Medal table ==
Rank	Nation	Gold	Silver	Bronze	Total
1	Australia (AUS)	3	2	0	5
2	France (FRA)	1	3	1	5
3	United States (USA)	1	1	2	4
4	Netherlands (NLD)	1	1	0	2
5	Denmark (DEN)	1	0	1	2
5	Great Britain (GBR)	1	0	1	2
7	Belgium (BEL)	1	0	0	1
7	Canada (CAN)	1	0	0	1
7	Italy (ITA)	1	0	0	1
10	Germany (DEU)	0	2	3	5
11	Austria (AUT)	0	1	0	1
11	Russia (RUS)	0	1	0	1
13	Czech Republic (CZE)	0	0	1	1
13	Japan (JPN)	0	0	1	1
13	Ukraine (UKR)	0	0	1	1
Totals (15 entries)		11	11	11	33
