= 1986 World Juniors Track Cycling Championships =

- Venue: Casablanca, Morocco
- Date: August 1986

The 1986 World Juniors Track Cycling Championships were the 12th annual Junior World Championships for track cycling held in Casablanca, Morocco in August 1986.

The Championships had five events for men only: Sprint, Points race, Individual pursuit, Team pursuit and 1 kilometre time trial.

== Events ==
Event	Gold	Silver	Bronze
Men's Events
Sprint	Denis Lemyre; France	Vladimir Sultanov; Soviet Union	Eyk Pokorny; Germany
Points race	Stefan Steinweg; Germany	R Nielsen; Denmark	Roxan Vandervelde; Belgium
Individual pursuit	Sergei Vodopianov; Soviet Union	Gianluca Bortolami; Italy	Davide Solari; Italy
Team pursuit	Sergei Vodopianov; Remigijus Lupeikis; Aida Klimavitschus; Dragos Tschivinski; Soviet Union	Dirk Vogel; Jorg Pawelczyk; Andreas Bach; Thomas Liese; East Germany	Gianluca Bortolami; Davide Solari; Fabio Baldato; Endrio Leoni; Italy
Time trial	Vladimir Sultanov; Soviet Union	Marek Skorski; Poland	Bernardo Gonzalez Minano; Spain

== Medal table ==
* Host nation (Morocco)

Rank	Nation	Gold	Silver	Bronze	Total
1	Soviet Union (URS)	3	1	0	4
2	Germany (GER)	1	0	1	2
3	France (FRA)	1	0	0	1
4	Italy (ITA)	0	1	2	3
5	Denmark (DEN)	0	1	0	1
5	East Germany (DDR)	0	1	0	1
5	Poland (POL)	0	1	0	1
8	Belgium (BEL)	0	0	1	1
8	Spain (SPA)	0	0	1	1
Totals (9 entries)		5	5	5	15
