= Cycling at the 1991 Pan American Games =

This page shows the results of the Cycling Competition at the 1991 Pan American Games, held from March 11 to March 26, 1991 in Havana, Cuba. There were a total number of seven men's and four women's events.

== Men's competition ==
=== Men's 1.000m Match Sprint (Track) ===
RANK	CYCLIST
1st place, gold medalist(s)	Richard Young; Canada
2nd place, silver medalist(s)	Daniel Hiram; Cuba
3rd place, bronze medalist(s)	Jhon González; Colombia

=== Men's 1.000m Time Trial (Track) ===
RANK	CYCLIST
1st place, gold medalist(s)	Gene Samuel; Trinidad and Tobago
2nd place, silver medalist(s)	Erin Hartwell; United States
3rd place, bronze medalist(s)	Germán García; Argentina

=== Men's 4.000m Points Race (Track) ===
RANK	CYCLIST
1st place, gold medalist(s)	Erminio Suárez; Argentina
2nd place, silver medalist(s)	Jairo Giraldo; Colombia
3rd place, bronze medalist(s)	Conrado Cabrera; Cuba

=== Men's 4.000m Individual Pursuit (Track) ===
RANK	CYCLIST
1st place, gold medalist(s)	Raúl Domínguez; Cuba
2nd place, silver medalist(s)	Dirk Copeland; United States
3rd place, bronze medalist(s)	Miguel Droguett; Chile

=== Men's 4.000m Team Pursuit (Track) ===
RANK	CYCLIST
1st place, gold medalist(s)	Cuba; Noel Betancourt; Raúl Dominguez; Noel de la Cruz; Eugenio Castro
2nd place, silver medalist(s)	United States; Chris Coletta; Jim Pollak; Timothy Quigley; Matt Hamon
3rd place, bronze medalist(s)	Argentina; Gustavo Guglielmone; Fabio Placanica; Hugo Pratissoli; Erminio Suarez

=== Men's Individual Race (Road, 164 km) ===
RANK	CYCLIST
1st place, gold medalist(s)	Robinson Merchán; Venezuela
2nd place, silver medalist(s)	Heriberto Rodríguez Adorno; Cuba
3rd place, bronze medalist(s)	Wanderley Magalhães; Brazil

=== Men's Team Time Trial (Road) ===
RANK	CYCLIST
1st place, gold medalist(s)	Colombia; Asdrubal Patiño; Héctor Palacio; Ruber Marín; Juan Fajardo
1st place, gold medalist(s)	Cuba; Roberto Rodríguez; Mario Pérez; Eliécer Valdés; Eduardo Alonso
3rd place, bronze medalist(s)	United States; John Loehner; Richard McClung; David Nicholson; Steve Larsen

== Women's competition ==
=== Women's 1.000m Sprint (Track) ===
RANK	CYCLIST
1st place, gold medalist(s)	Tanya Dubnicoff; Canada
2nd place, silver medalist(s)	Julie Gregg; United States
3rd place, bronze medalist(s)	Jessica Grieco; United States

=== Women's 3.000m Individual Pursuit (Track) ===
RANK	CYCLIST
1st place, gold medalist(s)	Kendra Kneeland; United States
2nd place, silver medalist(s)	Clara Hughes; Canada
3rd place, bronze medalist(s)	Tatiana Fernández; Cuba

=== Women's Individual Race (Road) ===
RANK	CYCLIST
1st place, gold medalist(s)	Jeanne Golay; United States
2nd place, silver medalist(s)	Odalys Toms; Cuba
3rd place, bronze medalist(s)	Janice Bolland; United States

=== Women's Team Time Trial (Road) ===
RANK	CYCLIST
1st place, gold medalist(s)	United States; Jeanne Golay; Shari Rodgers; Janice Bolland; Dede Barry
2nd place, silver medalist(s)	Cuba; Tatiana Fernández; Odalys Toms; María González; Enedilma Poveda
3rd place, bronze medalist(s)	Canada; Edie Fisher; Clara Hughes; Denise Kelly; Sharon Keogh

== Medal table ==
Place	Nation	Gold medal	Silver medal	Bronze medal	Total
1	United States	3	4	3	10
2	Cuba	3	4	2	9
3	Canada	2	1	1	4
4	Colombia	1	1	1	3
5	Argentina	1	0	2	3
6	Trinidad and Tobago	1	0	0	1
6	Venezuela	1	0	0	1
8	Brazil	0	0	1	1
8	Chile	0	0	1	1
Total		12	10	11	33
