= Jesús Vázquez =

Jesús Vázquez may refer to:

- Jesús Vázquez (television presenter) (born 1965), Spanish television presenter
- Jesús Vázquez (cyclist) (born 1969), Mexican cyclist
- Jesús Vázquez (footballer, born 1980), Spanish former footballer
- Jesús Vázquez (footballer, born 1994), Mexican soccer player
- Jesús Vázquez (footballer, born 1995), American soccer player
- Jesús Vázquez (footballer, born 2003), Spanish footballer

== See also ==
- Jesús Vásquez (1920–2010), Peruvian singer
