= Aeschbach =

Aeschbach is a surname. Notable people with the surname include:

- Alexander Äschbach (born 1974), Swiss racing cyclist
- Andreas Aeschbach (born 1970), Swiss cyclist
- Kelly Aeschbach (born 1968), American vice admiral
