= Panáček =

Panáček (feminine: Panáčková) is a Czech surname. Notable people with the surname include:

- Jan Panáček (born 1970), Czech cyclist
- Josef Panáček (1937–2022), Czech sport shooter
- Marek Panáček (born 2002), Czech squash player
