= Michael Belcourt =

Canadian cyclist

Personal information
- Born: 29 August 1964 (age 62) Montreal, Quebec, Canada

Cycling career
- Sport: Cycling

Michael Belcourt (born 29 August 1964) is a Canadian former cyclist. He competed in the individual pursuit at the 1992 Summer Olympics. In the qualifying round, he came in 15th place, advancing to Group B quarterfinals. He competed against Ivan Beltrami in Heat 3 of the Group B quarterfinals. Belcourt did not move on to the semi-finals. He was inducted into the Québec Cycling Hall of Fame in November 2012.
