= Hernán López =

Hernán López may refer to:

- Hernán López (cyclist) (born 1973), Argentine cyclist
- Hernan Lopez (entrepreneur), Argentinian media executive
- Hernán López (footballer) (born 2000), Argentine footballer
