= Billy Shearsby =

Australian cyclist

Personal information
- Full name: Billy Joe Shearsby
- Born: 14 September 1972 (age 54)

Cycling career
- Sport: Cycling
- Current team: Retired
- Disciplines: Track; Road
- Role: Rider
Medal record
Men's track cycling
Representing Australia
UCI Track World Championships
Gold medal – first place	1993 Hamar	Team pursuit

Billy Joe Shearsby (born 14 September 1972) is an Australian former track cyclist. He won the team pursuit at the 1993 UCI Track Cycling World Championships in Hamar, Norway, alongside Brett Aitken, Stuart O'Grady and Tim O'Shannessey. It was the first gold medal for Australia in this event. In addition, the team also set a new world record, covering the four kilometers in 4:03.840. In road cycling, he won the Grafton to Inverell Classic in 1992.
