= Arnolds Ūdris =

Latvian cyclist (born 1968)

Personal information
- Born: 18 January 1968 (age 58); Riga, Latvia

Arnolds Ūdris (born 18 January 1968) is a Latvian former cyclist. He competed in two events at the 1992 Summer Olympics.
