= Renee Duprel =

American track cyclist

Personal information
- Full name: Renee Duprel
- Born: 1965
- Height: 5 ft 5 in (165 cm)
- Weight: 135 lb (61 kg)

Cycling career
- Sport: Cycling
- Discipline: Track
- Role: Rider
Medal record
Women's track cycling
Gold medal – first place	1991 US Nationals	Sprint
Gold medal – first place	1990 US Nationals	Sprint
Silver medal – second place	1989 US Nationals	Sprint
Representing the United States
Women's track cycling
World Championships
Silver medal – second place	1990 Maebashi	Sprint
Pan American Games
Silver medal – second place	1987 Indianapolis	Sprint

Renee Duprel (1966) is a former American professional track cyclist. She competed at the UCI Track Cycling World Championships from 1989 to 1991, placing second in 1990, and she placed second in the Pan American Games in 1987. In 1993, she was named as a member of the Senior National Cycling Team.

== Awards ==
- 1987 (United States) Pan American Games sprint silver medalist
- 1988 Paris (Île-de-France) sprint bronze medalist
- 1989 United States National Track Championships sprint silver medalist
- 1990 (United States) UCI Track Cycling World Championships sprint silver medalist
- 1990 Goodwill Games bronze medalist
- 1990 United States National Track Championships sprint champion
- 1991 United States National Track Championships sprint champion

== Personal life ==
Duprel attended Forest Ridge School of the Sacred Heart in Bellevue, Washington. Though she originally had wanted to participate in basketball and gymnastics, she began cycling when her father told her it would be good training for basketball, and then he and her brother "used to drop [her] on the hills and [rush her]." She disliked cycling until her father signed both siblings up for track racing classes, where she would race against boys as there were no other girls. When racing during her childhood at the Marymoor Velodrome, she and her brother would nearly get kicked out of races for arguing beforehand. She was also still often the only girl competing. In 1988, she moved from Washington to the East coast and the Lehigh County Velodrome where there were more women to train against.

During the racing seasons, Duprel would train in Trexlertown, Pennsylvania. Duprel dated fellow track cyclist and sprinter Ken Carpenter.

After retiring from professional racing, Duprel began to coach children and adults in cycling.
