= Julie Gregg (cyclist) =

American cyclist and coach

Personal information
- Full name: Julie Ann Gregg
- Born: May 27, 1966 (age 60) Kirkland, Washington, United States

Cycling career
- Sport: Cycling
- Disciplines: Road & Track
- Role: Rider
Medal record
Representing United States
Pan American Games
Silver medal – second place	1991 Havana	Individual sprint

Julie Ann Gregg (born 1966) is an American ex-racing cyclist and cycle coach.

== Early life ==
Gregg was born in the Kirkland, Washington area 1966, the daughter of keen cyclist and Seattle cycle store keeper Stan Gregg. She began racing in 1989 aged 23. She went on to win medals at national level and competed internationally winning silver medals in the Tokyo Grand Prix, the Pan American Games in Cuba.

== Awards and recognitions ==
Gregg was inducted into the City of Kirkland's Plaza of Champions in 1992.

She has continued to compete and has won medals at the Masters World Track Championships.

Gregg turned to coaching and completed the United States Cycling Federation's Elite Coaching program in Colorado Springs.

== Palmarès ==
1991
2nd Sprint, Pan American Games

2001
1st Team pursuit, US Masters National Track Championships
