= Nigel Donnelly =

New Zealand cyclist (born 1968)

Personal information
- Born: 7 July 1968 (age 58) Christchurch, New Zealand
- Height: 1.86 m (6 ft 1 in)
- Weight: 76 kg (168 lb)

Cycling career
- Sport: Cycling
Medal record
Representing New Zealand
Men's track cycling
Commonwealth Games
Gold medal – first place	1990 Auckland	4000 m Team Pursuit

Nigel James Donnelly (born 7 July 1968) is a New Zealand cyclist, who won a gold medal representing his country at the 1990 Commonwealth Games. He also competed at the 1988 Summer Olympics and the 1992 Summer Olympics.

== Early life and family ==
Donnelly was born in Christchurch on 7 July 1968, the son of Edward Ernest and Margaret Lucy Donnelly, and was educated at Burnside High School. In 1993, he married Lyndal Maria Smith. His daughter Samantha Donnelly has also represented New Zealand in track cycling.

== Cycling career ==
Donnelly represented New Zealand at the 1986 World Junior Cycling Championships. He went on to compete for New Zealand in the men's 4000 m team pursuit at two Olympic Games. At Seoul in 1988, he was a member of the team that placed 14th, while at Barcelona in 1992, the New Zealand men's pursuit team finished in seventh place. He competed in the same event at the 1990 Commonwealth Games in Auckland, winning the gold medal with Gary Anderson, Glen McLeay and Stuart Williams.

== Honours and awards ==
In 1990, Donnelly was awarded the New Zealand 1990 Commemoration Medal.
