= Gerben Broeren =

Dutch cyclist

Personal information
- Full name: Gerben Gerardus Johannes Broeren
- Born: 19 December 1972 Sint-Michielsgestel, Netherlands
- Height: 196 cm (6 ft 5 in)
- Weight: 80 kg (176 lb)

Cycling career
- Sport: Cycling
- Discipline: Track cycling

Gerben Gerardus Johannes Broeren (born 19 December 1972) is a track cyclist from the Netherlands. He competed in the men's team pursuit at the 1992 Summer Olympics, finishing 12th.

== See also ==
- List of Dutch Olympic cyclists
