= Tony Ledgard =

Peruvian cyclist

Tony Ledgard OLY
Personal information
- Born: 17 December 1971 (age 54) Lima, Peru

Cycling career
- Sport: Cycling

Anthony Ledgard (born 17 December 1971) is a Peruvian former cyclist. He competed in the individual pursuit at the 1992 Summer Olympics.
