= Noël de la Cruz =

Cuban cyclist (born 1968)

Personal information
- Born: 20 June 1968 (age 58)

Cycling career
- Sport: Cycling
Medal record
Representing Cuba
Pan American Games
Gold medal – first place	1991 Havana	Team pursuit
Central American and Caribbean Games
Gold medal – first place	1990 Mexico City	Team pursuit
Gold medal – first place	1993 Ponce	Team pursuit
Silver medal – second place	1993 Ponce	Individual pursuit

Noël Antonio de la Cruz Morales (born 20 June 1968) is a Cuban former cyclist. He competed in the team pursuit at the 1992 Summer Olympics.
