= Rudolf Juřícký =

Czech cyclist

Personal information
- Born: 24 October 1971 (age 54) Prague, Czechoslovakia

Cycling career
- Sport: Cycling

Rudolf Juřícký (born 24 October 1971) is a Czech former cyclist. He competed in the team pursuit at the 1992 Summer Olympics.
