= Wanderley Magalhães Azevedo =

Brazilian cyclist

Personal information
- Born: 8 October 1966 Goiânia, Brazil
- Died: 28 March 2006 (aged 39) Goiânia, Brazil

Cycling career
- Sport: Cycling
- Role: Rider

Professional team
- 1993–1994: Lotto
Medal record
Representing Brazil
Men's road cycling
Pan American Games
Bronze medal – third place	1991 Havana	Individual Road Race

Wanderley Magalhães Azevedo (8 October 1966 – 28 March 2006) was a Brazilian professional racing cyclist. He rode the 1994 Tour de France. He also competed at the 1988 Summer Olympics and 1992 Summer Olympics.

== Major results ==
1986
1st Rutas de América
5th Volta a Portugal
1988
1st Tour de Santa Catarina
1989
1st Prova Ciclística 9 de Julho
1990
1st Prova Ciclística 9 de Julho
1991
(bronze) Pan American, Individual Road Race
1st Prova Ciclística 9 de Julho
1st Tour de Santa Catarina
1992
2nd Prova Ciclística 9 de Julho
