= Michal Baldrián =

Czech cyclist

Personal information
- Born: 16 February 1970 (age 56)

Cycling career
- Sport: Cycling

Michal Baldrián (born 16 February 1970) is a Czech former cyclist. He competed in the individual pursuit at the 1992 Summer Olympics.
