= Scott Richardson (cyclist) =

South African cyclist

Personal information
- Born: 28 May 1971 (age 55)

Cycling career
- Sport: Cycling

Scott Richardson (born 28 May 1971) is a South African former cyclist. He competed in two events at the 1992 Summer Olympics.
