= Niels van der Steen =

Dutch cyclist

Personal information
- Born: 31 January 1972 Hoogland, Netherlands
- Height: 185 cm (6 ft 1 in)
- Weight: 70 kg (154 lb)

Cycling career
- Sport: Cycling
- Discipline: Track cycling

Niels van der Steen (born 31 January 1972) is a cyclist from the Netherlands. He competed in the men's team pursuit at the 1992 Summer Olympics with team mates Servais Knaven, Gerben Broeren & Erik Cent, finishing 12th.

== See also ==
- List of Dutch Olympic cyclists
