= John Malois =

Canadian cyclist

Personal information
- Born: 1 February 1971 (age 55) Calgary, Alberta, Canada

Cycling career
- Sport: Cycling

John Malois (born 1 February 1971) is a Canadian former cyclist. He competed in the men's point race at the 1992 Summer Olympics.

== Biography ==
In August 2026, John Malois introduces himself to the four female track cyclists who will represent Canada in the endurance events at the Junior Track Cycling World Championships in Heusden-Zolder, Belgium.
