= Li Wenkai =

Chinese cyclist

Personal information
- Born: 27 August 1969 (age 57)

Cycling career
- Sport: Cycling

Li Wenkai (born 27 August 1969) is a Chinese former cyclist. He competed in two events at the 1992 Summer Olympics.
