= Hiroshi Daimon =

Japanese cyclist (born 1962)

Personal information
- Full name: Hiroshi Daimon
- Born: 16 February 1962 (age 64) Ishikawa, Japan

Cycling career
- Sport: Cycling
- Current team: EF Education–Nippo Development Team
- Discipline: Road
- Role: Rider (retired); Team manager; Directeur sportif

Managerial teams
- 2007–2008: Nippo Corporation–Meitan Hompo–Asada
- 2010: Team Nippo
- 2011–2019: D'Angelo & Antenucci–Nippo
- 2021–: Nippo–Provence–PTS Conti

Hiroshi Daimon (大門 宏, Daimon Hiroshi; born 16 February 1962) is a Japanese former cyclist, who currently works as a directeur sportif for UCI Continental team EF Education–Nippo Development Team. He competed in the men's point race at the 1992 Summer Olympics. During his career, he rode for European teams before joining Nippo Hodō in 1991.
