= Jens Glücklich =

East German cyclist (born 1966)

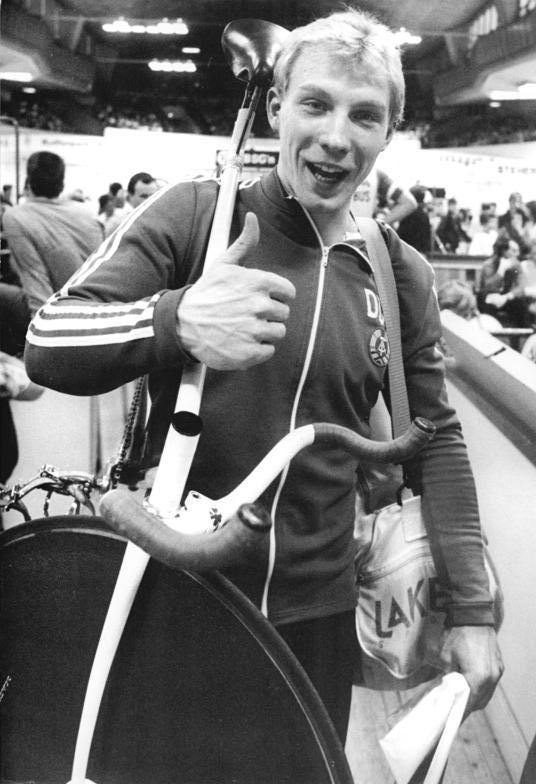
- Jens Glücklich in 1989

Personal information
- Born: 10 July 1966 (age 60) Cottbus, East Germany
- Height: 178 cm (5 ft 10 in)
- Weight: 75 kg (165 lb)

Cycling career
- Sport: Cycling
Medal record
Men's track cycling
Representing East Germany
World Championships (Amateur)
Gold medal – first place	1985 Bassano del Grappa	1 km time trial
Gold medal – first place	1989 Lyon	1 km time trial
Silver medal – second place	1987 Vienna	1 km time trial
Silver medal – second place	1991 Stuttgart	1 km time trial
Bronze medal – third place	1986 Colorado Springs	1 km time trial
Bronze medal – third place	1990 Maebashi	1 km time trial
Representing Germany
World Championships (Professional/Elite)
Bronze medal – third place	1993 Hamar	1 km time trial

Jens Glücklich (born 10 July 1966) is a German former cyclist who, prior to the German reunification, competed for East Germany. He competed in the track time trial at the 1992 Summer Olympics.
