= Bill Huck =

German racing cyclist (born 1965)

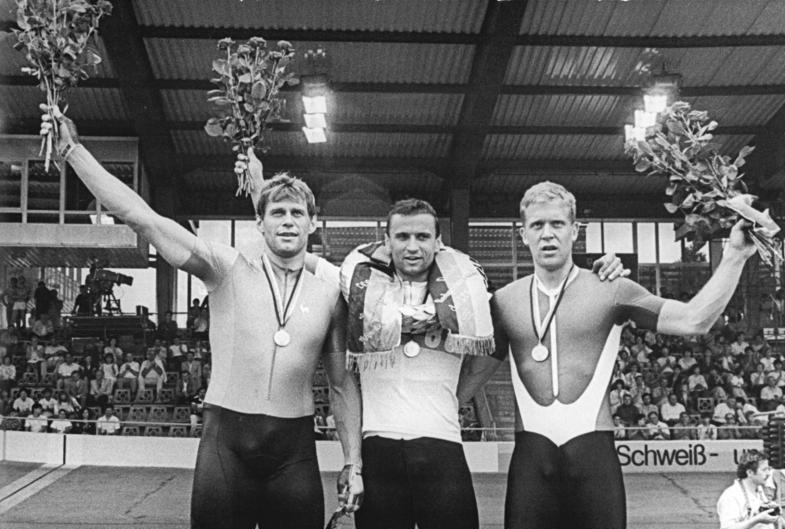
- Huck (r) at the 1988 German championships

Personal information
- Born: 9 March 1965 (age 61) Dresden, East Germany

Cycling career
- Sport: Cycling
- Discipline: Track
- Role: Rider
- Rider type: Sprinter
Medal record
Representing East Germany
Men's track cycling
World Championships
Gold medal – first place	1989 Lyon	Amateur sprint
Gold medal – first place	1990 Maebashi	Amateur sprint
Silver medal – second place	1987 Vienna	Amateur sprint
Silver medal – second place	1991 Stuttgart	Amateur sprint

Bill Huck (born 9 March 1965 in Dresden) is a German racing cyclist who won the world championships in sprint 1989, 1990. He competed for the SC Dynamo Berlin / Sportvereinigung (SV) Dynamo.
