= Fabio Placanica =

Argentine cyclist (born 1970)

Personal information
- Born: 10 April 1970 (age 56)

Sport
- Sport: Cycling
Medal record
Representing Argentina
Pan American Games
Bronze medal – third place	1991 Havana	Team pursuit

Óscar Fabio Placanica Bonetti (born 10 April 1970) is an Argentine former cyclist. He competed in the team pursuit at the 1992 Summer Olympics.
