= Ken Frost (cyclist) =

Danish cyclist (born 1967)

Personal information
- Born: 15 February 1967 (age 59) Rødovre, Denmark

Cycling career
- Sport: Cycling
Medal record
Men's cycling
Representing Denmark
Olympic Games
Bronze medal – third place	1992 Barcelona	Team pursuit

Ken Frost (born 15 February 1967) is a Danish cyclist. He won the bronze medal in the Men's team pursuit in the 1992 Summer Olympics.
