= Klaus Kynde Nielsen =

Danish cyclist

Personal information
- Born: 13 April 1966 (age 60) Aarhus, Denmark

Cycling career
- Sport: Cycling
- Current team: Retired
- Discipline: Track
- Role: Rider
Medal record
Men's cycling
Representing Denmark
Olympic Games
Bronze medal – third place	1992 Barcelona	Team pursuit
World Championships
Bronze medal – third place	1993 Hamar	Team pursuit

Klaus Kynde Nielsen (born 13 April 1966) is a Danish former cyclist. He won the bronze medal in the Men's team pursuit at the 1992 Summer Olympics.

== Major results ==
1994
Bayern Rundfahrt

1st Stage 1a
1st Stage 4b
