= Gustavo Guglielmone =

Argentine cyclist

Personal information
- Nickname: Guli
- Born: 16 May 1971 (age 55) Mar del Plata, Argentina

Cycling career
- Sport: Cycling
Medal record
Representing Argentina
Pan American Games
Bronze medal – third place	1991 Havana	Team pursuit

Gustavo Alberto Guglielmone de la Broca (born 16 May 1971) is an Argentine former cyclist. He competed in the team pursuit at the 1992 Summer Olympics. That same year, he won the Vuelta del Este, a cycling race in Mendoza, Argentina.
