= Carlos Pérez (cyclist) =

Argentine cyclist (born 1970)

Personal information
- Born: 29 October 1970 (age 55)

Cycling career
- Sport: Cycling

Carlos Pérez (born 29 October 1970) is an Argentine former cyclist. He competed in the team pursuit at the 1992 Summer Olympics.
