= Yasuhiro Ando =

Japanese cyclist (born 1969)

Personal information
- Born: 13 December 1969 (age 56) Miyagi, Japan

Cycling career
- Sport: Cycling

Yasuhiro Ando (安藤 康洋, Andō Yasuhiro; born 13 December 1969) is a Japanese former cyclist. He competed in the team pursuit at the 1992 Summer Olympics.
