= Chris Coletta (cyclist) =

American cyclist

Personal information
- Born: July 29, 1972 (age 54) Maywood, Illinois, United States

Cycling career
- Sport: Cycling
Medal record
Representing United States
Pan American Games
Silver medal – second place	1991 Havana	Team pursuit

Christopher John Coletta (born July 29, 1972) is an American former cyclist. He competed in the team pursuit at the 1992 Summer Olympics.

Coletta graduated from University of Illinois Urbana-Champaign in 1998 with a bachelor of science in chemistry and Harvard University in 2007 with a Ph.D. in organic chemistry.
