= Lars Olsen (cyclist) =

Danish cyclist

Personal information
- Full name: Lars Otto Olsen
- Born: 29 June 1965 (age 61) Copenhagen, Denmark

Cycling career
- Sport: Cycling
- Discipline: Track
Medal record
Representing Denmark
Men's track cycling
World Championships
Bronze medal – third place	1993 Hamar	Team pursuit

Lars Otto Olsen (born 29 June 1965) is a Danish former cyclist. He competed in the team pursuit event at the 1988 Summer Olympics.
