= Arturo García (cyclist, born 1969) =

Mexican cyclist

Personal information
- Born: 3 August 1969 (age 57)

Cycling career
- Sport: Cycling

Arturo García (born 3 August 1969) is a Mexican former cyclist. He competed in the team pursuit at the 1992 Summer Olympics.
