= Cycling at the 1987 Pan American Games =

- Venues: Major Taylor Velodrome (track); Brown County State Park (road)
- No. of events: 10 (7 men, 3 women)

The cycling competition at the 1987 Pan American Games was held from August 7 to August 23, 1987, in Indianapolis, United States. There were a total number of seven men's and three women's events. The 1987 Games represented the first time women competed in cycling at the Pan American Games. Events were held at the Major Taylor Velodrome and at Brown County State Park.

== Men's competition ==
=== 200 m Match Sprint (Track) ===
RANK	CYCLIST
1st place, gold medalist(s)	Ken Carpenter (USA)
2nd place, silver medalist(s)	Mark Gorski (USA)
3rd place, bronze medalist(s)	Curtis Harnett (CAN)

=== 1 km Time Trial (Track) ===
RANK	CYCLIST
1st place, gold medalist(s)	Curtis Harnett (CAN)
2nd place, silver medalist(s)	Gene Samuel (TRI)
3rd place, bronze medalist(s)	Leonard Nitz (USA)

=== 50 km Points Race (Track) ===
RANK	CYCLIST
1st place, gold medalist(s)	Federico Moreira (URU)
2nd place, silver medalist(s)	José Youshimatz (MEX)
3rd place, bronze medalist(s)	Conrado Cabrera (CUB)

=== 4000 m Individual Pursuit (Track) ===
RANK	CYCLIST
1st place, gold medalist(s)	Gabriel Curuchet (ARG)
2nd place, silver medalist(s)	David Brinton (USA)
3rd place, bronze medalist(s)	Patrick Beauchemin (CAN)

=== 4000 m Team Pursuit (Track) ===
RANK	CYCLIST
1st place, gold medalist(s)	United States
2nd place, silver medalist(s)	Argentina
3rd place, bronze medalist(s)	Brazil

=== Individual Race (Road, 171 km) ===
RANK	CYCLIST
1st place, gold medalist(s)	Luis Rosendo Ramos (MEX)
2nd place, silver medalist(s)	Marcos Mazzaron (BRA)
3rd place, bronze medalist(s)	Enrique Campos (VEN)

=== Team Time Trial (Road, 100 km) ===
RANK	CYCLIST
1st place, gold medalist(s)	United States
2nd place, silver medalist(s)	Cuba
3rd place, bronze medalist(s)	Mexico

== Women's competition ==
=== 200 m Match Sprint (Track) ===
RANK	CYCLIST
1st place, gold medalist(s)	Connie Paraskevin-Young (USA)
2nd place, silver medalist(s)	Renee Duprel (USA)
3rd place, bronze medalist(s)	Olga Ruyol (CUB)

=== 3000 m Individual Pursuit (Track) ===
RANK	CYCLIST
1st place, gold medalist(s)	Rebecca Twigg (USA)
2nd place, silver medalist(s)	Kelly-Ann Way (CAN)
3rd place, bronze medalist(s)	Enedilma Poveda (CUB)

=== Individual Race (Road, 57 km) ===
RANK	CYCLIST
1st place, gold medalist(s)	Rebecca Twigg (USA)
2nd place, silver medalist(s)	Inge Thompson-Benedict (USA)
3rd place, bronze medalist(s)	Sara Neil (CAN)
3rd place, bronze medalist(s)	Katrin Tobin (USA)

== Medal table ==
Place	Nation	Gold medal	Silver medal	Bronze medal	Total
1	United States	6	4	2	12
2	Canada	1	1	3	5
3	Mexico	1	1	1	3
4	Argentina	1	1	0	2
5	Uruguay	1	0	0	1
6	Cuba	0	1	3	4
7	Brazil	0	1	1	2
8	Trinidad and Tobago	0	1	0	1
9	Venezuela	0	0	1	1
Total		10	10	11	31
