= Éric Magnin =

French cyclist

Personal information
- Born: 29 May 1967 (age 59) Oullins, France

Cycling career
- Sport: Cycling
- Current team: Retired
- Disciplines: Track; Road
- Role: Rider

Professional team
- 1992: RMO (stagiaire)
Medal record
Representing France
Men's track cycling
World Championships
Silver medal – second place	1993 Hamar	Points race

Éric Magnin (born 29 May 1967) is a French former cyclist. He competed in the men's point race at the 1992 Summer Olympics.
