= Daniel Pandèle =

French cyclist

Personal information
- Born: 24 December 1961 (age 64) Le Bouscat, France

Cycling career
- Sport: Cycling

Daniel Pandèle (born 24 December 1961) is a French former cyclist. He competed in the team pursuit at the 1992 Summer Olympics.
