= Andreas Bach =

German track cyclist

Personal information
- Born: 10 October 1968 (age 58) Erfurt, East Germany

Cycling career
- Sport: Cycling
- Current team: Retired
- Discipline: Track
- Role: Rider

Professional team
- 1997: E-Plus Service
Medal record
Men's track cycling
Representing Germany
World Championships
Gold medal – first place	1994 Palermo	Team Pursuit
Silver medal – second place	1993 Hamar	Team Pursuit

Andreas Bach (born 10 October 1968, in Erfurt) is a German former track cyclist. He won the team pursuit at the 1994 UCI Track Cycling World Championships with Guido Fulst, Danilo Hondo and Jens Lehmann.

== Major results ==
1986
2nd Team pursuit, UCI Junior World Championships
1993
2nd Team pursuit, UCI World Championships
1994
1st Team pursuit, UCI World Championships
1st Team pursuit, National Track Championships
