= Erminio Suárez =

Argentine cyclist

Personal information
- Born: 27 June 1969 (age 57)
Medal record
Men's track cycling
Representing Argentina
Pan American Games
Gold medal – first place	1991 Havana	Points Race

Erminio Antonio Suárez Gauna (born 27 June 1969) is a retired male track cyclist from Argentina. He claimed the gold medal in the Men's Points Race at the 1991 Pan American Games in Havana, Cuba, defeating Jairo Giraldo (Colombia) and Conrado Cabrera (Cuba). Suárez represented his native country at the 1992 Summer Olympics, finishing in tenth place in the same event.
