= Andrew Martin (cyclist) =

Guamanian cyclist

Personal information
- Born: 4 December 1961 (age 64)

Cycling career
- Sport: Cycling

Andrew Martin (born 4 December 1961) is a former cyclist from Guam. He competed in the team pursuit at the 1992 Summer Olympics.
