= Jonathan Garrido =

Spanish cyclist

Personal information
- Born: 27 November 1973 (age 52) Barcelona, Spain

Cycling career
- Sport: Cycling

Jonathan Garrido (born 27 November 1973) is a Spanish cyclist. He competed in the team pursuit at the 1992 Summer Olympics.
