= Esteban López (cyclist) =

Colombian cyclist

Personal information
- Born: 28 February 1974 (age 52)

Cycling career
- Sport: Cycling

Esteban López (born 28 February 1974) is a Colombian former cyclist. He competed in the team pursuit at the 1992 Summer Olympics.
