= Eugenio Castro =

Cuban cyclist

Edilberto Velazquez
Personal information
- Born: 17 August 1971 (age 55)

Cycling career
- Sport: Cycling

Edilberto Velazquez Castro (born 1 July 1971) is a Cuban former cyclist. He competed in the team pursuit at the 1992 Summer Olympics.
