= Andreas Aeschbach =

Swiss cyclist (born 1970)

Personal information
- Born: 25 April 1970 (age 56) Hallwil, Switzerland

Cycling career
- Sport: Cycling

Andreas Aeschbach (born 25 April 1970) is a Swiss former cyclist. He competed in the men's point race at the 1992 Summer Olympics.
