= Fernando Sierra =

Colombian cyclist

Personal information
- Born: 23 February 1966 (age 60)

Cycling career
- Sport: Cycling

Fernando Sierra (born 23 February 1966) is a Colombian former cyclist. He competed in the team pursuit at the 1992 Summer Olympics.
