= Carl Sundquist =

American cyclist

Personal information
- Born: November 24, 1961 (age 64) Indianapolis, Indiana, United States

Cycling career
- Sport: Cycling
- Discipline: Track
- Role: Rider
Medal record
Representing United States
Men's track cycling
World Championships
Silver medal – second place	1994 Palermo	Team pursuit

Carl Sundquist (born November 24, 1961) is an American former cyclist. He competed at the 1988 Summer Olympics and the 1992 Summer Olympics.
