= Jan Panáček =

Czech cyclist

Personal information
- Born: 8 August 1970 (age 56) Ostrava, Czechoslovakia

Cycling career
- Sport: Cycling

Jan Panáček (born 8 August 1970) is a Czech former cyclist. He competed in the team pursuit at the 1992 Summer Olympics.
