= Olaf Paltian =

German cyclist

Personal information
- Born: 21 September 1952 (age 74) Berlin, Germany

Cycling career
- Sport: Cycling

Olaf Paltian (born 21 September 1952) is a German former cyclist. He competed in the team time trial event at the 1976 Summer Olympics.
