= Georgios Portelanos =

Greek cyclist (born 1966)

Personal information
- Born: 29 August 1966 (age 60) Athens, Greece

Cycling career
- Sport: Cycling

Georgios Portelanos (born 29 August 1966) is a Greek former cyclist. He competed in two events at the 1992 Summer Olympics.
