= Jesús Vázquez (cyclist) =

Mexican cyclist

Personal information
- Born: 30 October 1969 (age 56)

Cycling career
- Sport: Cycling

Jesús Vázquez (born 30 October 1969) is a Mexican former cyclist. He competed in the team pursuit at the 1992 Summer Olympics.
