= Masaru Saito =

Japanese baseball player (born 1988)

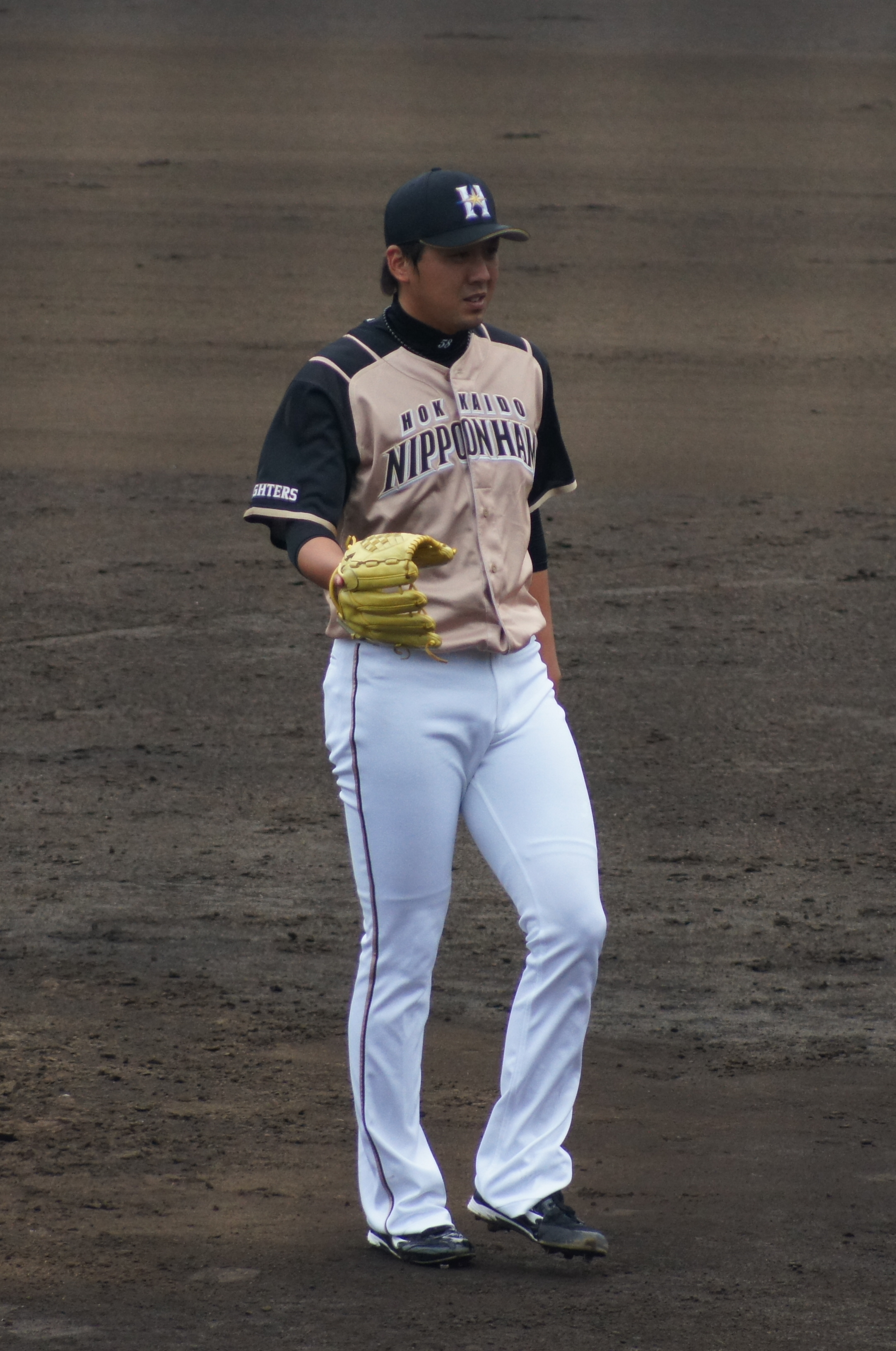
- Saito with the Hokkaido Nippon Ham Fighters
- Pitcher
- Born: January 6, 1988 (age 38)
- Batted: Left Threw: Left

NPB debut
- September 16, 2013, for the Hokkaido Nippon-Ham Fighters

Last NPB appearance
- April 25, 2014, for the Hokkaido Nippon-Ham Fighter

NPB statistics
- Win–loss record: 0–0
- Earned run average: 6.14
- Strikeouts: 7
- Stats at Baseball Reference

Teams
- Hokkaido Nippon-Ham Fighters (2011–2015)

Masaru Saito (齊藤 勝, Saitō Masaru) (born January 6, 1988) is a Japanese former professional baseball pitcher. He played in Nippon Professional Baseball (NPB) for the Hokkaido Nippon-Ham Fighters from 2013 to 2014.

== Career ==
Saito debuted in 2013 with the Hokkaido Nippon-Ham Fighters. He had three strikeouts in his debut.
