= Team pursuit =

Team event in cycle racing

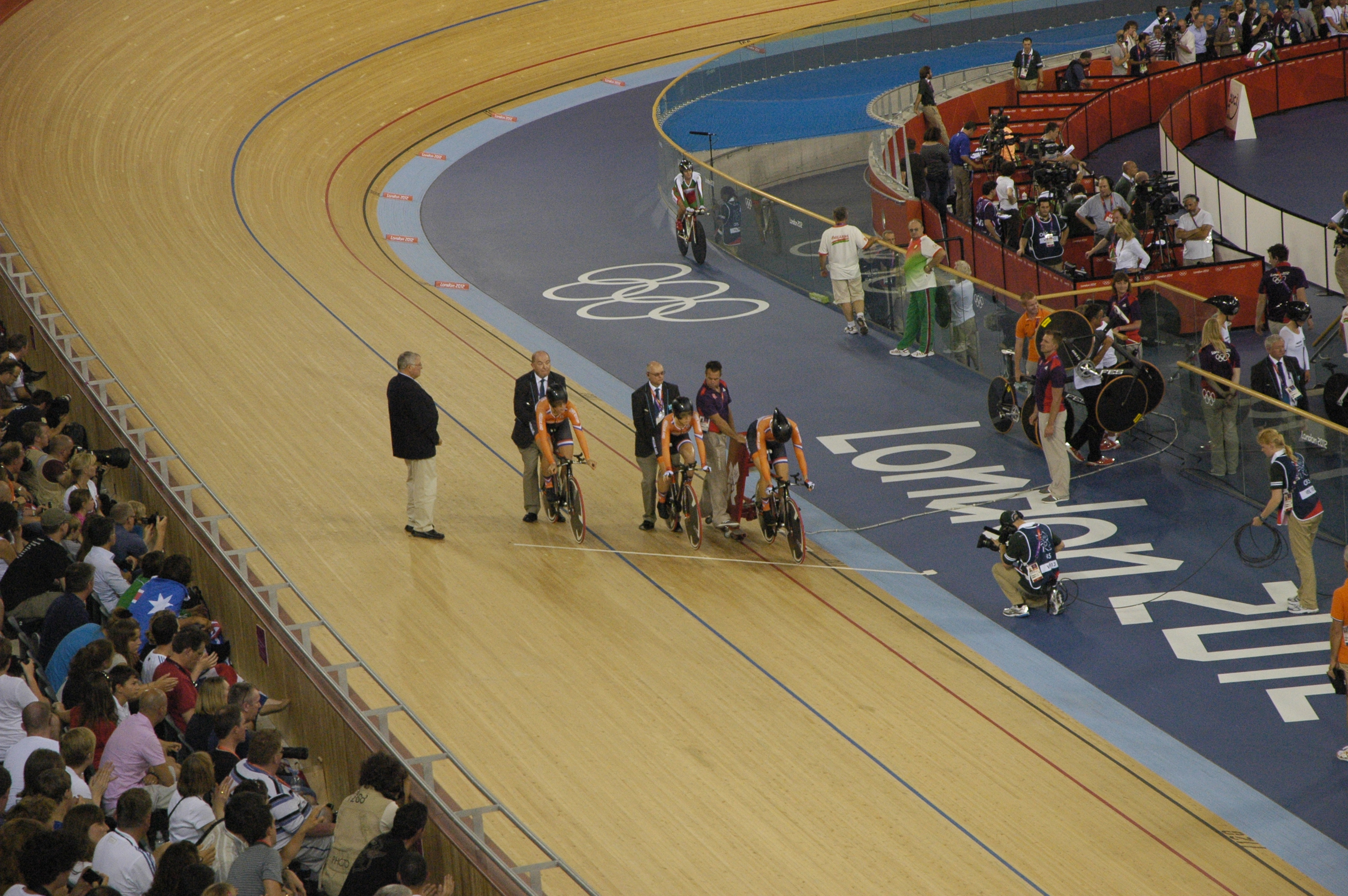
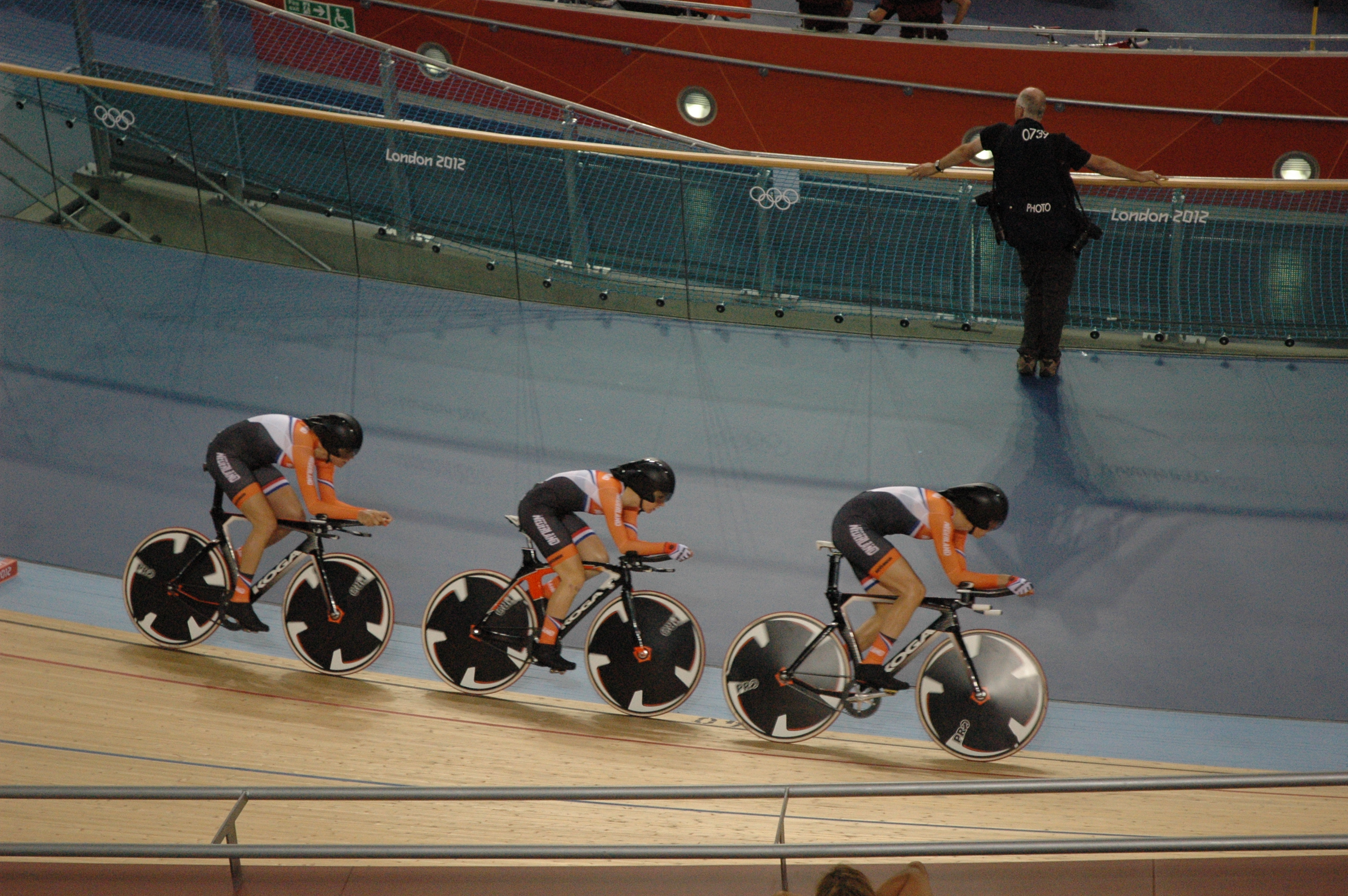
The start (top) and the race (bottom) of a women's team pursuit with three riders at the 2012 Summer Olympics. (Pictured: Ellen van Dijk, Amy Pieters and Vera Koedooder)

The team pursuit is a track cycling event similar to the individual pursuit, except that two teams, each of up to four riders, compete, starting on opposite sides of the velodrome.

== Race format ==
Both men's and women's events are competed over a distance of 4 km, by a team of 4 riders. Prior to the start of the 2012–13 season the women's event was competed over a distance of 3 km, by a team of 3 riders.

As with the individual pursuit, the objective is to cover the distance in the fastest time or to catch and overtake the other team in a final. Riders in a team follow each other closely in line, drafting to minimize total drag, and periodically the lead rider (who works the hardest) peels off the front, swings up the track banking and rejoins the team at the rear. The position of the third rider is pivotal because final times are measured as the third team member's front wheel crosses the finishing line. Since the winning team is decided by the third rider, it is common for one rider to take a "death pull", pedaling very hard before the finish to tow the teammates, which means that this rider cannot maintain the group-pace afterwards. This allows their teammates to briefly recover behind them before they make a final three-person acceleration towards the finish line.

=== Qualifying ===
The first round of the competition at major events is the qualifying round. This still involves two teams on the track at the same time: they are not directly competing against each other but attempting to set the fastest time to progress in the competition. In the Olympic Games since 2012, the top teams progress into knock-out rounds, with the top two surviving into the gold- and silver-medal race and the top two teams from all remaining compete in the bronze-medal race. Prior to 2012, the two losers of the knock-out rounds would race for the bronze medal; this change was instituted to encourage performance from all qualifying teams since all would have a chance to race for a medal depending on their performance. In the World Championships or World Cup Classic events the top two teams from the qualifying round progress directly to the gold- and silver-medal race while the third and fourth qualifiers compete for bronze.

== Major races ==
Olympic Games	men's	women's
World Championships	men's	women's
World Cup	men's	women's

== See also ==
- World record progression – Men's team pursuit
- World record progression – Women's team pursuit
- Individual pursuit
- Team time trial
