= Hernán López (cyclist) =

Argentine cyclist

Personal information
- Born: 5 July 1973 (age 53)

Cycling career
- Sport: Cycling

Hernán López (born 5 July 1973) is an Argentine former cyclist. He competed in the individual pursuit at the 1992 Summer Olympics.
