= Burkhard Ebert =

German cyclist (1942–2025)

Personal information
- Born: 4 July 1942 Berlin, Germany
- Died: 4 October 2025 (aged 83) Lenggries, Bavaria, Germany

Cycling career
- Sport: Cycling

Burkhard Ebert (4 July 1942 – 4 October 2025) was a German cyclist. He competed at the 1964 Summer Olympics and the 1968 Summer Olympics.

Ebert died in Lenggries, Bavaria on 4 October 2025, at the age of 83.
