= Hugo Gamboa =

Colombian equestrian (born 1958)

Personal information
- Nationality: Colombian
- Born: 3 August 1958 (age 66)

Sport
- Sport: Equestrian

Hugo Gamboa (born 3 August 1958) is a Colombian former equestrian. He competed in two events at the 1992 Summer Olympics.
