= Mark Kingsland =

Australian cyclist (born 1970)

Personal information
- Born: 14 July 1970 (age 56)

Cycling career
- Sport: Cycling
Medal record
Men's track cycling
Representing Australia
Commonwealth Games
Silver medal – second place	1990 Auckland	Men's Individual Pursuit

Mark Lyle Kingsland (born 14 July 1970) is an Australian former cyclist. He competed in the individual pursuit at the 1992 Summer Olympics.
