= Majid Nasseri =

Iranian cyclist (born 1968)

Personal information
- Full name: Majid Nasseri Khorram
- Born: 23 August 1968 (age 58) Golmakan, Iran

Cycling career
- Sport: Cycling

Majid Nasseri Khorram (Persian: مجید ناصری خرم, born 23 August 1968) is an Iranian former cyclist. He competed in two events at the 1992 Summer Olympics. He also worked as the national team coach.
