= Gabriel Aynat =

Spanish cyclist

Personal information
- Born: 12 January 1972 (age 54) Manacor, Spain

Cycling career
- Sport: Cycling

Gabriel Aynat (born 12 January 1972) is a Spanish former cyclist. He competed in two events at the 1992 Summer Olympics.
