= Cédric Mathy =

Belgian cyclist

Personal information
- Born: 2 February 1970 (age 56) Ixelles, Belgium

Cycling career
- Sport: Cycling
Medal record
Men's cycling
Representing Belgium
Olympic Games
Bronze medal – third place	1992 Barcelona	Points race

Cédric Mathy (born 2 February 1970) is a Belgian former cyclist. He competed for Belgium in the 1992 Summer Olympics held in Barcelona, Spain in the points race event where he won the bronze medal.
