= James Howard Pollak Jr. =

Cyclist

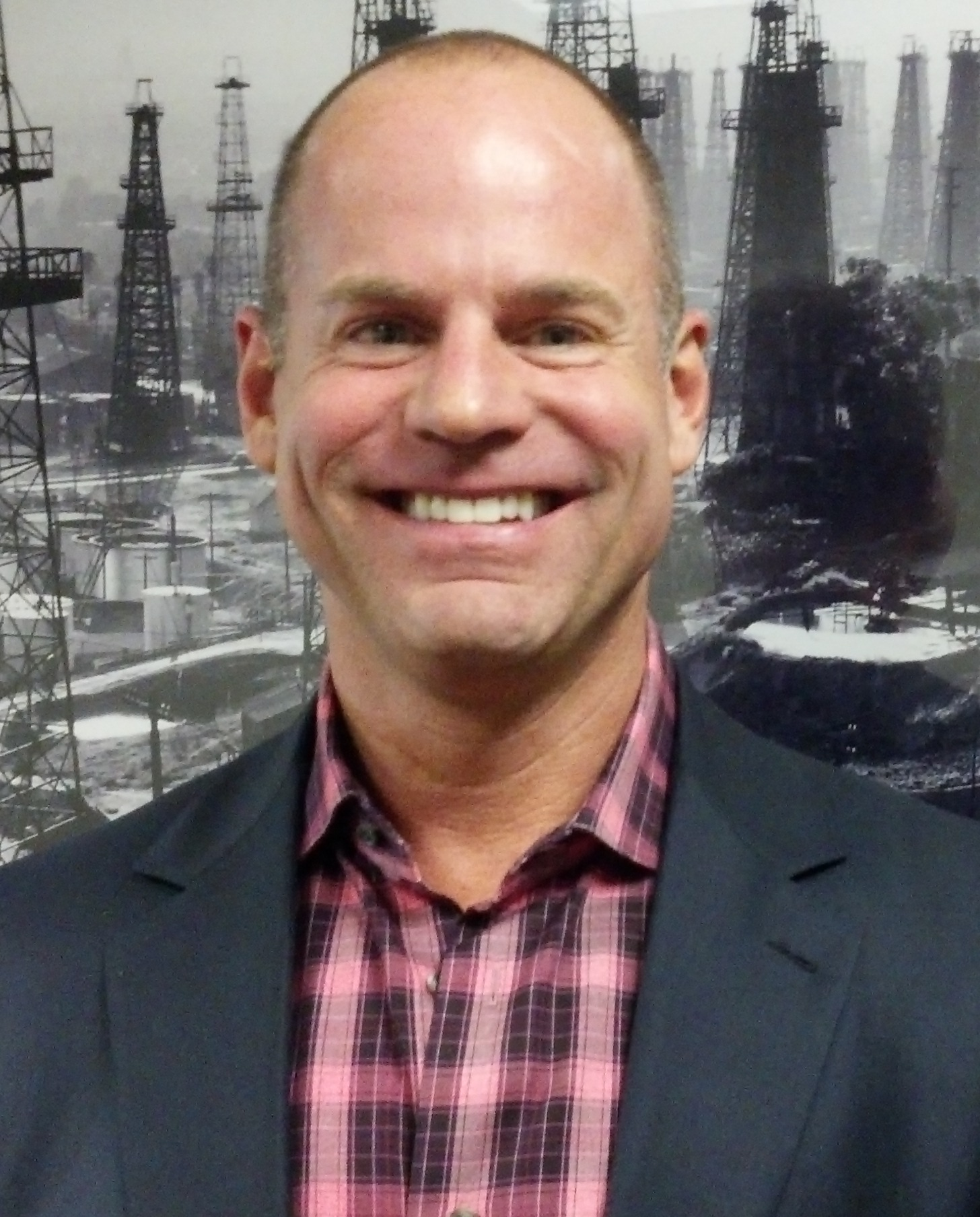
- Jim Pollak

Personal information
- Born: October 6, 1963 (age 63) St. Louis, Missouri, United States

Cycling career
- Sport: Cycling

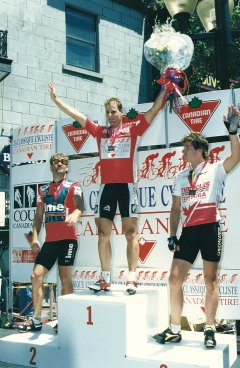

James Howard Pollak Jr. (born October 6, 1963) is a retired cyclist who competed in the 1992 Summer Olympics.

== Early life ==
Pollak was born in St. Louis, Missouri. When he was nine years old, he was diagnosed with a degenerative hip disease, called Legg-Calve-Perthes, that confined him to a full leg brace and crutches for two years, and made it impossible for him to play sports. He was told the likelihood of playing competitive sports was remote and contact sports were out of the question. He went on to letter in five sports at Horton Watkins High School.

== Cycling career ==
He then studied at Indiana University, in hopes of competing for the cross country team, but was not successful. One of his fraternity brothers at Alpha Epsilon Pi, told him about a bicycle race called the Little 500 that took after the world-famous Indianapolis 500 Indy race. He competed and found his new passion, cycling, guiding his fraternity to fourth place his freshman year and then second, first and second the next three years. He was voted as rookie rider of the year his freshman year and all-star rider the following three years and was inducted into the Little 500 Hall of Fame at the end of his senior year.

He graduated from Indiana University in 1986 with a B.S. in Law and Public Policy. He put off a law career in an attempt to become a U.S. Olympic Cyclist. At his first Olympic Trials in 1988 in Houston, he was first alternate to the team. He won four U.S. National Championships during his career along with a gold medal in the points race at The Goodwill Games in 1990, and a silver medal in the team pursuit in The Pan American Games in 1991 in Havana, Cuba. Pollak was a member of the team pursuit in 1990 that set a U.S. National record. He rode for the Subaru Montgomery Cycling Team in 1990, until they turned professional the following year. He finished his career riding for Evian Miko as the only American on a Canadian team. Pollak qualified for the 1992 Olympics in the team pursuit at the Olympic Trials in Blaine, Minnesota. At the 1992 Summer Olympics in Barcelona, Spain, his American squad rode to a ninth-place finish.

== Other activities ==
Pollak retired from cycling, and has worked with many unfortunate children afflicted by his same disease as well as with the Ronald McDonald House. he has spoken in front of several large groups of children about life as an athlete and motivation. He was named to the St. Louis Jewish Sports Hall of Fame in 2011. He spent several years in the investment world working with major investment banking giants Prudential Securities and Paine Webber UBS. Pollak turned his career to oil and gas exploration and development in 2004 and is the president and CEO of Patriot Natural Resources. He started Progress Medical in 2018, which primary business is working with doctors to heal patients with advanced chronic non-healing wounds. Progress Medical now distributes one of the most diversified wound care portfolios.
