= Michael Glöckner =

German cyclist (born 1969)

Personal information
- Born: 27 May 1969 (age 57) Ehingen, West Germany

Cycling career
- Sport: Cycling
- Discipline: Track
Medal record
Representing Germany
Men's track cycling
Olympic Games
Gold medal – first place	1992 Barcelona	Men's team pursuit

Michael Glöckner (born 27 May 1969) is a German cyclist. He won the gold medal in the Men's team pursuit at the 1992 Summer Olympics along with Jens Lehmann, Stefan Steinweg, Guido Fulst and Andreas Walzer.
