= Alberny Vargas =

Colombian cyclist

Personal information
- Born: 5 June 1969 (age 57)

Cycling career
- Sport: Cycling

Alberny Vargas (born 5 June 1969) is a Colombian former cyclist. He competed in two events at the 1992 Summer Olympics.
