= Valery Batura =

Soviet cyclist

Personal information
- Born: 3 February 1970 (age 56)

Cycling career
- Sport: Cycling

Valery Batura (born 3 February 1970) is a Soviet former cyclist. He competed in the team time trial at the 1992 Summer Olympics for the Unified Team.
