= Shaun O'Brien (cyclist) =

Australian cyclist (born 1969)

Personal information
- Born: 31 May 1969 (age 57)

Cycling career
- Sport: Cycling
- Discipline: Track
Medal record
Representing Australia
Men's track cycling
Olympic Games
| Silver medal – second place | 1992 Barcelona | Men's team pursuit |
Commonwealth Games
| Silver medal – second place | 1990 Auckland | Men's Team Pursuit |
| Silver medal – second place | 1990 Auckland | Men's 10 mile Scratch Race |

Shaun William O'Brien (born 31 May 1969) is an Australian cyclist. He won the silver medal in the Men's team pursuit at the 1992 Summer Olympics.
