= Andreas Walzer =

German cyclist

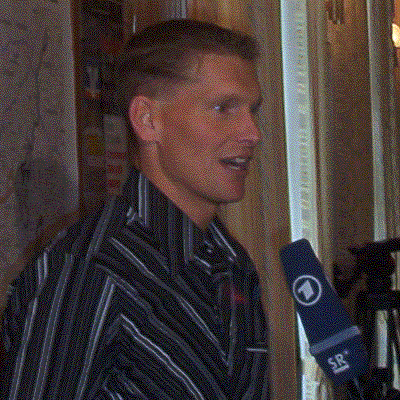

Personal information
- Born: 20 May 1970 (age 56) Homburg, West Germany

Cycling career
- Sport: Cycling
- Discipline: Track
Medal record
Representing Germany
Men's track cycling
Olympic Games
Gold medal – first place	1992 Barcelona	Men's team pursuit

Andreas Walzer (born 20 May 1970) is a German cyclist. He won the gold medal in the Men's team pursuit at the 1992 Summer Olympics along with Jens Lehmann, Stefan Steinweg, Guido Fulst and Michael Glöckner.
