= Ivan Beltrami =

Italian cyclist (born 1969)

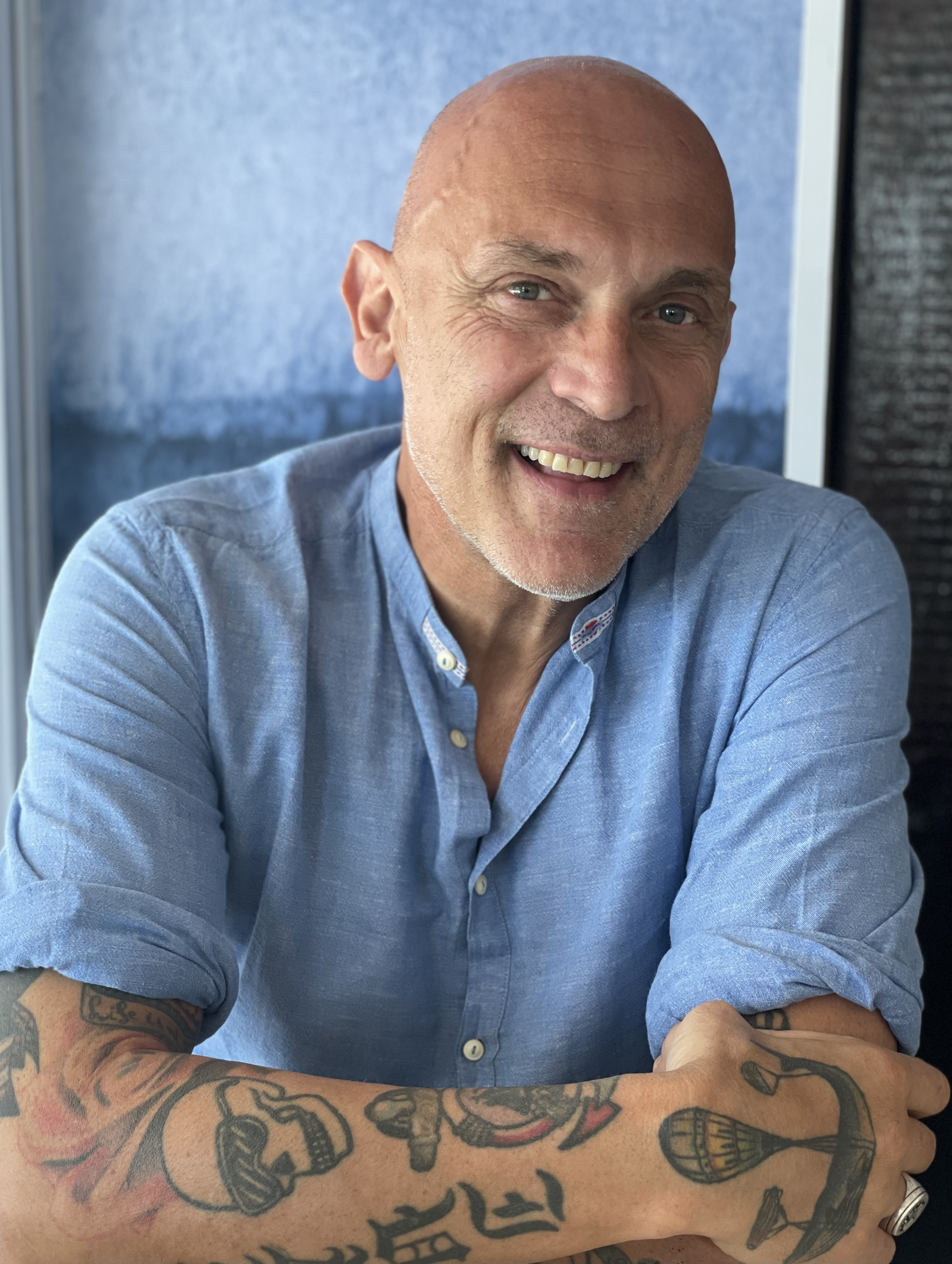
- Beltrami, 2023

Personal information
- Born: 27 June 1969 (age 57) Riva del Garda, Italy

Cycling career
- Sport: Cycling

Ivan Beltrami (born 27 June 1969) is an Italian former cyclist. He competed at the 1988 Summer Olympics and the 1992 Summer Olympics.
