= Jan Petersen (cyclist) =

Danish cyclist (born 1970)

Personal information
- Born: 28 July 1970 (age 56) Næstved, Denmark

Cycling career
- Sport: Cycling
- Current team: Retired
- Disciplines: Track; Road
- Role: Rider
Medal record
Men's cycling
Representing Denmark
Olympic Games
Bronze medal – third place	1992 Barcelona	Team pursuit
World Championships
Silver medal – second place	1994 Palermo	Points race
Bronze medal – third place	1993 Hamar	Team pursuit

Jan Bo Petersen (born 28 July 1970) is a Danish former cyclist. He won the bronze medal in the Men's team pursuit in the 1992 Summer Olympics.

== Major results ==
=== Road ===
1988
2nd Time trial, National Junior Road Championships
1990
3rd Overall Tour de Berlin
1992
1st Overall Tour de Berlin
1994
2nd Overall Cinturón a Mallorca
1995
1st Time trial, National Road Championships
1st Overall Tour de Berlin
1996
2nd Time trial, National Road Championships
