= Stuart Williams (cyclist) =

New Zealand cyclist

Personal information
- Born: 19 September 1967 (age 59) Auckland, New Zealand

Cycling career
- Sport: Cycling

Stuart Williams (born 19 September 1967) is a New Zealand cyclist. He competed at the 1988 Summer Olympics and the 1992 Summer Olympics.
