= Conrado Cabrera =

Cuban racing cyclist (born 1967)

Personal information
- Born: 24 April 1967 (age 59)
Medal record
Men's cycling
Representing Cuba
Pan American Games
Bronze medal – third place	1987 Indianapolis	Points Race
Bronze medal – third place	1991 Havana	Points Race

Conrado Adalberto Cabrera Marrero (born 24 April 1967) is a retired male track cyclist from Cuba. Cabrera represented his native country at the 1992 Summer Olympics in Barcelona, Spain. He also claimed two bronze medals at the Pan American Games.
