= Velòdrom d'Horta =

Velodrome in Barcelona, Spain

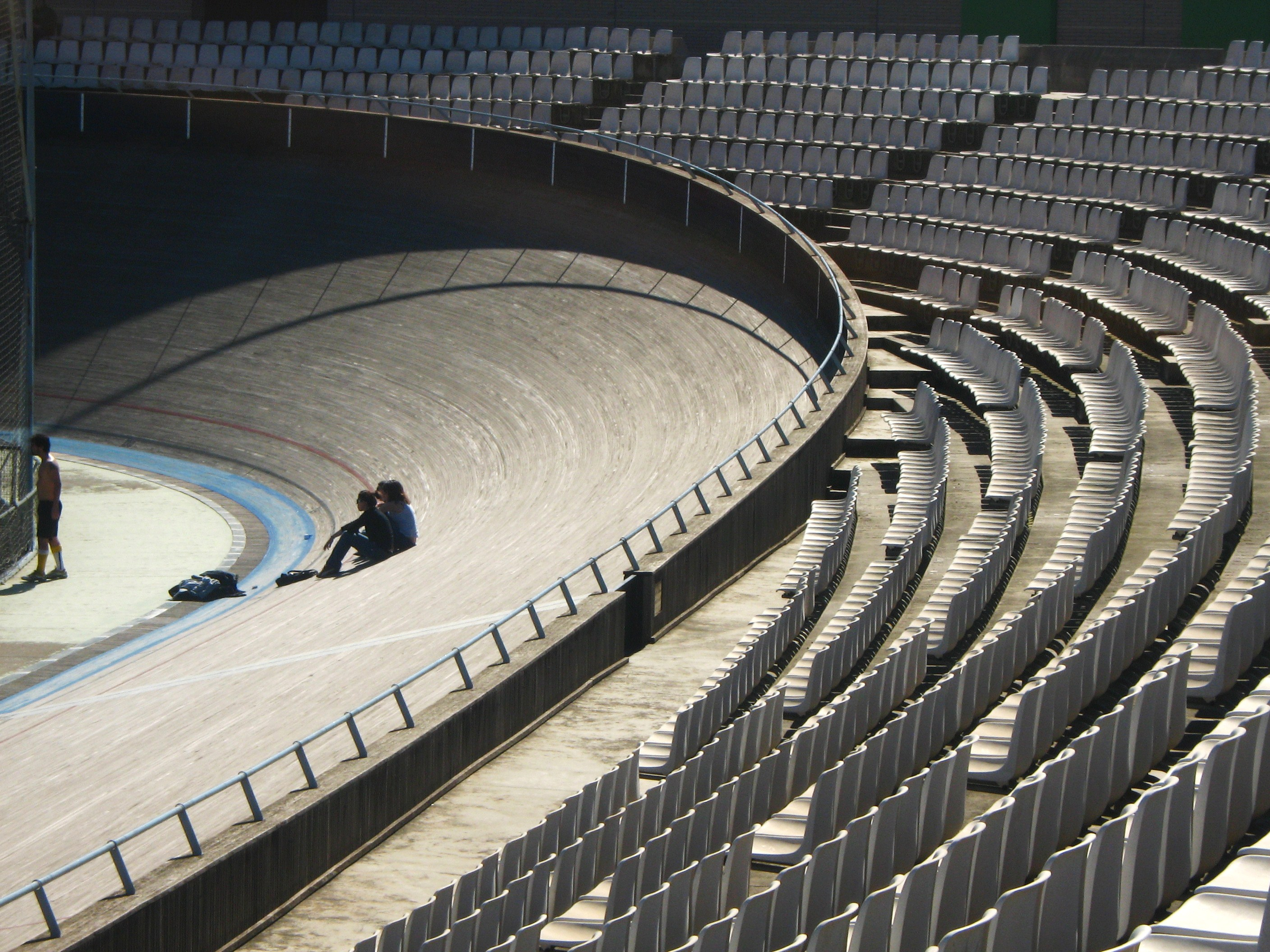
- The banking of the Velòdrom d'Horta
- Interactive map of Velòdrom d'Horta
- Location: Barcelona, Catalonia, Spain
- Coordinates: 41.43813°N 2.148861°E
- Capacity: 3,200 seated 11,000 standing
- Surface: Track: wood (250 m or 270 yd); Infield: artificial turf

Construction
- Opened: August 1984
- Architects: Esteve Bonell and Francesc Rius (velodrome); Herbert Schürmann (track)

Velòdrom d'Horta is a velodrome located in Barcelona, Catalonia, Spain. It was the track cycling venue for the 1992 Summer Olympics and was also the venue for the UCI Track Cycling World Championships in 1984.

The velodrome, designed by Esteve Bonell and Francesc Rius, was built in 1984 as the first of Barcelona's construction projects in preparation for the bid for the 1992 Summer Olympics in 1986. It was the first velodrome built to new FIAC rules permitting a 250 m (270 yd) track if surfaced with wood. The building won the FAD architecture prize in 1985.

It was the last permanent open-air velodrome used for Olympic Track Cycling events (Atlanta's velodrome at Stone Mountain in 1996 was temporary). Olympic velodromes have been built with a roof since 2000.

== See also ==
- List of cycling tracks and velodromes

Preceded by Oerlikon Velodrome; Zürich	UCI Track Cycling World Championships; Venue; 1984	Succeeded by Rino Mercante Stadium; Bassano del Grappa
