= Glenn McLeay =

New Zealand cyclist

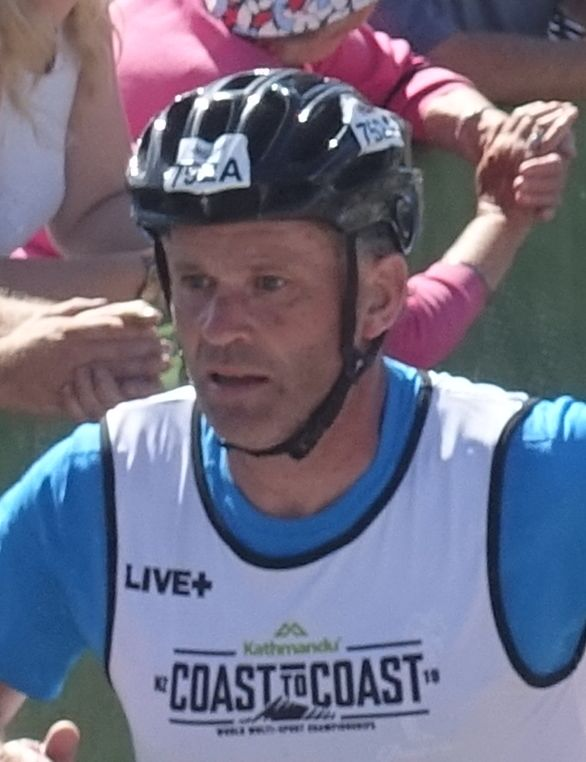
- McLeay in 2019

Personal information
- Born: 14 August 1968 (age 58) Invercargill, New Zealand

Cycling career
- Sport: Cycling

Glenn McLeay (born 14 August 1968) is a cyclist from New Zealand.

At the 1990 Commonwealth Games at Auckland he won a gold medal in the 4000m team pursuit, and came 9th in the 10 mile track pursuit.

At the 1992 Summer Olympics at Barcelona he came 4th in the points race and 7th in the 4000m team pursuit.

At the 1994 Commonwealth Games he won a silver medal in the 10 mile race, came 4th in the 4000m team pursuit, and came 4th in the points race.

At the 1996 Summer Olympics at Atlanta he came 9th in the points race.
