= Stephen McGlede =

Australian cyclist (born 1969)

Personal information
- Born: 13 April 1969 (age 57) Sydney, Australia

Cycling career
- Sport: Cycling
- Discipline: Track
Medal record
Representing Australia
Men's track cycling
Olympic Games
Silver medal – second place	1992 Barcelona	Men's team pursuit
Bronze medal – third place	1988 Seoul	Men's team pursuit
Commonwealth Games
Silver medal – second place	1990 Auckland	Men's Team Pursuit
Bronze medal – third place	1990 Auckland	Men's 10 mile Scratch Race

Stephen John McGlede (born 13 April 1969) is an Australian cyclist. He won the silver medal in Men's team pursuit in the 1992 Summer Olympics and the bronze medal in Men's team pursuit in the 1988 Summer Olympics
