= Stefan Steinweg =

German racing cyclist

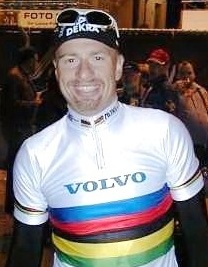

Personal information
- Born: 24 February 1969 (age 57) Dortmund, Nordrhein-Westfalen, West Germany
- Height: 183 cm (6 ft 0 in)
- Weight: 99 kg (218 lb)

Cycling career
- Sport: Cycling
- Current team: Retired
- Discipline: Track
Medal record
Representing Germany
Men's track cycling
Olympic Games
Gold medal – first place	1992 Barcelona	Men's team pursuit
World Championships
Gold medal – first place	1991 Stuttgart	Team pursuit
Gold medal – first place	2000 Manchester	Madison
Silver medal – second place	1990 Maebashi	Team pursuit
Silver medal – second place	2000 Manchester	Individual pursuit
Bronze medal – third place	1998 Bordeaux	Madison
Bronze medal – third place	2001 Antwerp	Individual pursuit
Bronze medal – third place	2002 Ballerup	Scratch

Stefan Steinweg (born 24 February 1969) is a retired professional racing cyclist from Germany. He won the gold medal in the team pursuit at the 1992 Summer Olympics.

Was a member of Radsportclub Opel Schüler Berlin Steinweg mostly raced on the track, mainly in six day races at the winter.

== Palmares ==
- Olympic Champion 1992 in Barcelona Olympics
- 3 times World Champion
- 10x World Cup winner
- 10x German Champion
