= Brett Aitken =

Australian cyclist (born 1971)

Personal information
- Born: 25 January 1971 (age 55) Adelaide, South Australia
- Height: 173 cm (5 ft 8 in)
- Weight: 65 kg (143 lb; 10.2 st)

Cycling career
- Sport: Cycling
- Discipline: Track cycling
- Role: Rider
Medal record
Representing Australia
Olympic Games
Gold medal – first place	2000 Sydney	Madison
Silver medal – second place	1992 Barcelona	Team pursuit
Bronze medal – third place	1996 Atlanta	Team pursuit
Commonwealth Games
Gold medal – first place	1994 Victoria	Team pursuit
Gold medal – first place	1994 Victoria	Points race
Silver medal – second place	1990 Auckland	Team pursuit
World Championships
Gold medal – first place	1993 Hamar	Team pursuit
Bronze medal – third place	1991 Stuttgart	Team pursuit

Brett Aitken OAM (born 25 January 1971) is an Australian Olympic track cyclist. He has won three Olympic medals, including gold in the Madison event at the 2000 Olympics. He retired from cycling in 2004, but returned in 2006 to ride on the Oceania Tour. On 16 January 2001, he was awarded the Australian Sports Medal for his gold medal-winning achievement.

Aitken was born in Adelaide and was affiliated with the Adelaide Cycling Club. He was also an Australian Institute of Sport scholarship holder.
