= Guido Fulst =

German cyclist (born 1970)

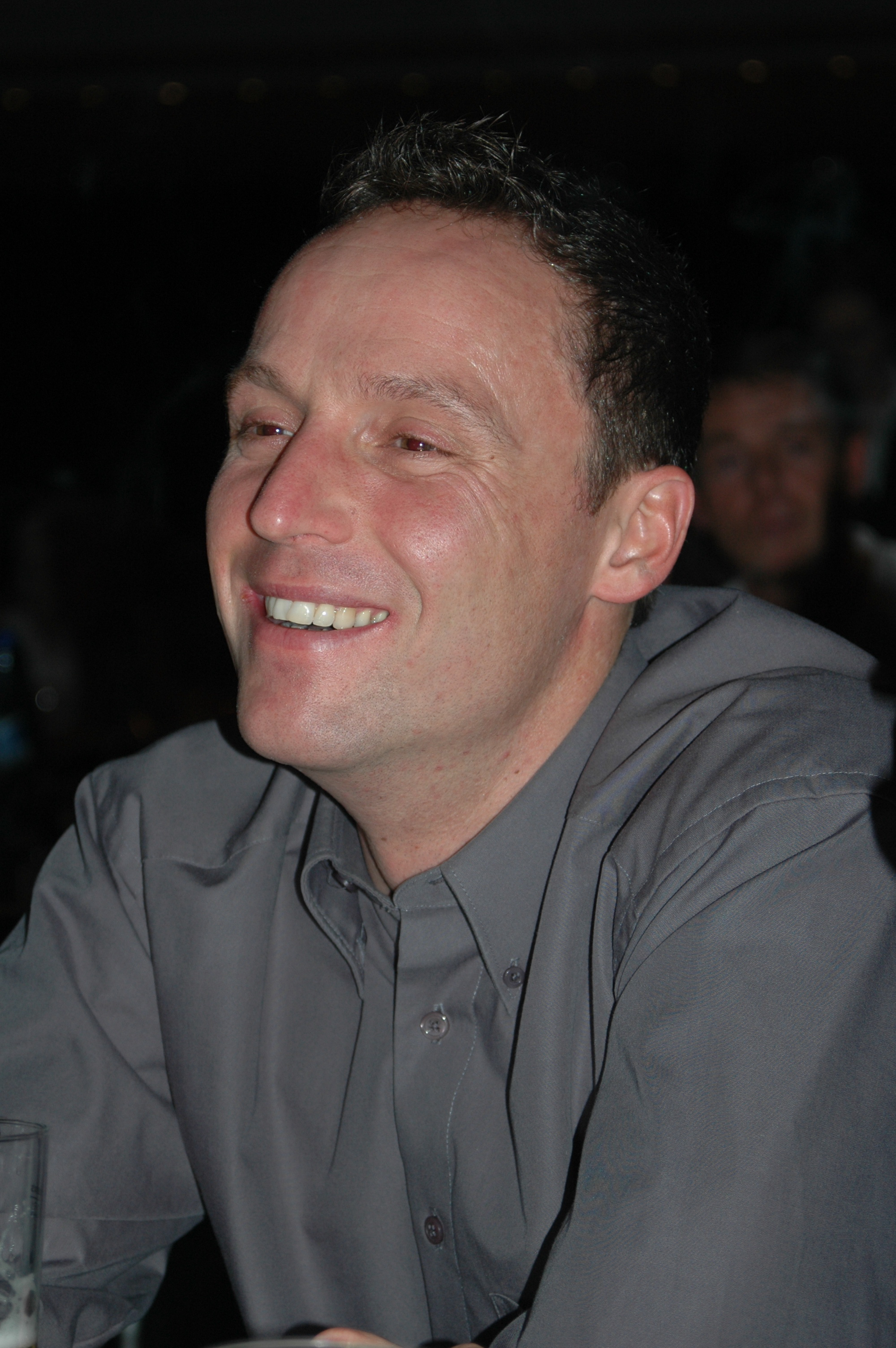
- Fulst in 2006

Personal information
- Full name: Guido Fulst
- Born: 7 June 1970 (age 56) Wernigerode, East Germany

Cycling career
- Sport: Cycling
- Discipline: Track
- Role: Rider
Medal record
Representing Germany
Men's track cycling
Olympic Games
Gold medal – first place	1992 Barcelona	Team Pursuit
Gold medal – first place	2000 Sydney	Team Pursuit
Bronze medal – third place	2004 Athens	Points race
World Championships
Gold medal – first place	1989 Lyon	Team Pursuit
Bronze medal – third place	1996 Manchester	Team pursuit

Guido Fulst (born 7 June 1970) is a former German racing cyclist, who competed for the SG Dynamo Wernigerode, SC Dynamo Berlin / Sportvereinigung (SV) Dynamo. He won many titles during his career. He won two gold medals and a bronze at the Olympic Games.
