= UCI Track Cycling World Championships – Men's team pursuit =

The UCI Track Cycling World Championships – Men's team pursuit is the team pursuit competition for men held annually at the UCI Track Cycling World Championships. Since its introduction as an elite event at the 1993 championships, Australia have won the gold medal the most with thirteen victories. Before 1993, the event was held for amateur teams.

== Medalists ==
Championships	Winner	Runner-up	Third
1993 Hamar	Stuart O'Grady; Brett Aitken; Billy Shearsby; Tim O'Shannessy; Australia	Andreas Bach; Guido Fulst; Jens Lehmann; Torsten Schmidt; Germany	Jimmi Madsen; Jan Bo Petersen; Lars Otto Olsen; Klaus Kynde Nielsen; Denmark
1994 Palermo	Guido Fulst; Andreas Bach; Jens Lehmann; Danilo Hondo; Germany	Adam Laurent; Dirk Copeland; Mariano Friedick; Carl Sundquist; United States	Tim O'Shannessy; Rodney McGee; Stuart O'Grady; Brett Aitken; Australia
1995 Bogotá	Stuart O'Grady; Bradley McGee; Rodney McGee; Tim O'Shannessy; Australia	Dmitri Tolstenkov; Bogdan Bondariew; Sergiy Matveyev; Alexander Symonenko; Ukraine	Mariano Friedick; Dirk Copeland; Zach Conrad; Matt Hamon; United States
1996 Manchester	Adler Capelli; Cristiano Citton; Andrea Collinelli; Mauro Trentini; Italy	Francis Moreau; Jean-Michel Monin; Philippe Ermenault; Cyril Bos; France	Guido Fulst; Danilo Hondo; Thorsten Rund; Heiko Szonn; Germany
1997 Perth	Adler Capelli; Cristiano Citton; Mario Benetton; Andrea Collinelli; Italy	Alexander Symonenko; Oleksandr Fedenko; Oleksandr Klymenko; Sergiy Matveyev; Ukraine	Franck Perque; Jérôme Neuville; Philippe Ermenault; Carlos Da Cruz; France
1998 Bordeaux	Alexander Symonenko; Sergiy Matveyev; Oleksandr Fedenko; Oleksandr Klymenko; Ukraine	Christian Lademann; Daniel Becke; Robert Bartko; Guido Fulst; Germany	Andrea Collinelli; Adler Capelli; Cristiano Citton; Mario Benetton; Italy
1999 Berlin	Guido Fulst; Robert Bartko; Jens Lehmann; Daniel Becke; Germany	Cyril Bos; Francis Moreau; Jérôme Neuville; Philippe Ermenault; France	Edouard Gritsoun; Alexei Markov; Vladislav Borisov; Denis Smyslov; Russia
2000 Manchester	Guido Fulst; Sebastian Siedler; Daniel Becke; Jens Lehmann; Germany	Bradley Wiggins; Jonathan Clay; Chris Newton; Paul Manning; Great Britain	Damien Pommereau; Jérôme Neuville; Philippe Gaumont; Cyril Bos; France
2001 Antwerp	Alexander Symonenko; Serhiy Cherniavskiy; Lyubomyr Polatayko; Oleksandr Fedenko; Ukraine	Bradley Wiggins; Chris Newton; Bryan Steel; Paul Manning; Great Britain	Sebastian Siedler; Christian Bach; Jens Lehmann; Guido Fulst; Germany
2002 Ballerup	Peter Dawson; Brett Lancaster; Stephen Wooldridge; Luke Roberts; Australia	Jens Lehmann; Christian Bach; Sebastian Siedler; Guido Fulst; Germany	Paul Manning; Bradley Wiggins; Chris Newton; Bryan Steel; Great Britain
2003 Stuttgart	Graeme Brown; Peter Dawson; Brett Lancaster; Luke Roberts; Australia	Bradley Wiggins; Bryan Steel; Paul Manning; Rob Hayles; Great Britain	Franck Perque; Fabien Sanchez; Jérôme Neuville; Fabien Merciris; France
2004 Melbourne	Ashley Hutchinson; Luke Roberts; Peter Dawson; Stephen Wooldridge; Australia	Chris Newton; Paul Manning; Rob Hayles; Bryan Steel; Great Britain	Asier Maeztu; Carlos Torrent; Sergio Escobar; Carlos Castaño; Spain
2005 Los Angeles	Chris Newton; Steve Cummings; Rob Hayles; Paul Manning; Great Britain	Niki Terpstra; Peter Schep; Jens Mouris; Levi Heimans; Netherlands	Mark Jamieson; Matthew Goss; Ashley Hutchinson; Stephen Wooldridge; Australia
2006 Bordeaux	Peter Dawson; Matthew Goss; Mark Jamieson; Stephen Wooldridge; Australia	Geraint Thomas; Paul Manning; Rob Hayles; Steve Cummings; Great Britain	Volodymyr Dyudya; Roman Kononenko; Maksym Polyshchuk; Lyubomyr Polatayko; Ukraine
2007 Palma de Mallorca	Ed Clancy; Geraint Thomas; Paul Manning; Bradley Wiggins; Great Britain	Vitaliy Schedov; Vitaliy Popkov; Maxim Polischuk; Lyubomyr Polatayko; Ukraine	Casper Jørgensen; Jens-Erik Madsen; Michael Mørkøv; Alex Rasmussen; Denmark
2008 Manchester	Ed Clancy; Geraint Thomas; Paul Manning; Bradley Wiggins; Great Britain	Michael Færk Christensen; Casper Jørgensen; Jens-Erik Madsen; Alex Rasmussen; Denmark	Mark Jamieson; Graeme Brown; Bradley McGee; Luke Roberts; Australia
2009 Pruszków	Casper Jørgensen; Jens-Erik Madsen; Michael Færk Christensen; Alex Rasmussen; Michael Mørkøv (qualifying round only); Denmark	Jack Bobridge; Rohan Dennis; Leigh Howard; Cameron Meyer; Australia	Westley Gough; Peter Latham; Marc Ryan; Jesse Sergent; New Zealand
2010 Ballerup	Jack Bobridge; Rohan Dennis; Michael Hepburn; Cameron Meyer; Australia	Steven Burke; Ed Clancy; Ben Swift; Andy Tennant; Great Britain	Sam Bewley; Westley Gough; Peter Latham; Jesse Sergent; New Zealand
2011 Apeldoorn	Jack Bobridge; Rohan Dennis; Michael Hepburn; Luke Durbridge; Australia	Alexei Markov; Evgeny Kovalev; Ivan Kovalev; Alexander Serov; Russia	Steven Burke; Peter Kennaugh; Andy Tennant; Sam Harrison; Great Britain
2012 Melbourne	Ed Clancy; Peter Kennaugh; Steven Burke; Geraint Thomas; Andrew Tennant (qualifying round only); Great Britain	Glenn O'Shea; Jack Bobridge; Rohan Dennis; Michael Hepburn; Australia	Aaron Gate; Sam Bewley; Westley Gough; Marc Ryan; New Zealand
2013 Minsk	Glenn O'Shea; Alex Edmondson; Michael Hepburn; Alexander Morgan; Australia	Steven Burke; Ed Clancy; Samuel Harrison; Andrew Tennant; Great Britain	Lasse Norman Hansen; Casper Folsach; Mathias Moller; Rasmus Christian Quaade; Denmark
2014 Cali	Glenn O'Shea; Alexander Edmondson; Mitchell Mulhern; Luke Davison; Miles Scotson (qualifying round only); Australia	Casper von Folsach; Lasse Norman Hansen; Rasmus Quaade; Alex Rasmussen; Denmark	Aaron Gate; Pieter Bulling; Dylan Kennett; Marc Ryan; New Zealand
2015 Yvelines	Pieter Bulling; Dylan Kennett; Alex Frame; Marc Ryan Regan Gough; New Zealand	Ed Clancy; Steven Burke; Owain Doull; Andrew Tennant; Great Britain	Jack Bobridge; Alexander Edmondson; Mitchell Mulhern; Miles Scotson; Australia
2016 London	Sam Welsford; Michael Hepburn; Callum Scotson; Miles Scotson; Alexander Porter; Luke Davison; Australia	Steven Burke; Jonathan Dibben; Ed Clancy; Owain Doull; Bradley Wiggins; Andy Tennant; Great Britain	Lasse Norman Hansen; Niklas Larsen; Frederik Madsen; Casper von Folsach; Rasmus Quaade; Denmark
2017 Hong Kong	Sam Welsford; Cameron Meyer; Alexander Porter; Nick Yallouris; Kelland O'Brien; Rohan Wight; Australia	Regan Gough; Pieter Bulling; Dylan Kennett; Nicholas Kergozou; New Zealand	Simone Consonni; Liam Bertazzo; Filippo Ganna; Francesco Lamon; Michele Scartezzini; Italy
2018 Appeldoorn	Ed Clancy; Kian Emadi; Ethan Hayter; Charlie Tanfield; Great Britain	Niklas Larsen; Julius Johansen; Frederik Madsen; Casper von Folsach; Denmark	Simone Consonni; Liam Bertazzo; Filippo Ganna; Francesco Lamon; Italy
2019 Pruszków	Sam Welsford; Kelland O'Brien; Leigh Howard; Alexander Porter; Cameron Scott; Australia	Ethan Hayter; Ed Clancy; Kian Emadi; Charlie Tanfield; Oliver Wood; Great Britain	Niklas Larsen; Lasse Norman Hansen; Rasmus Pedersen; Casper von Folsach; Julius Johansen; Denmark
2020 Berlin	Lasse Norman Hansen; Julius Johansen; Frederik Rodenberg; Rasmus Pedersen; Denmark	Campbell Stewart; Corbin Strong; Aaron Gate; Jordan Kerby; Regan Gough; New Zealand	Simone Consonni; Filippo Ganna; Francesco Lamon; Jonathan Milan; Michele Scartezzini; Italy
2021 Roubaix	Liam Bertazzo; Simone Consonni; Filippo Ganna; Jonathan Milan; Francesco Lamon; Italy	Thomas Boudat; Thomas Denis; Valentin Tabellion; Benjamin Thomas; France	Ethan Hayter; Ethan Vernon; Charlie Tanfield; Oliver Wood; Kian Emadi; Great Britain
2022 Saint-Quentin-en-Yvelines	Ethan Hayter; Oliver Wood; Ethan Vernon; Daniel Bigham; Great Britain	Filippo Ganna; Simone Consonni; Jonathan Milan; Manlio Moro; Francesco Lamon; Italy	Tobias Hansen; Carl-Frederik Bévort; Lasse Norman Hansen; Rasmus Pedersen; Denmark
2023 Glasgow	Niklas Larsen; Carl-Frederik Bévort; Lasse Norman Leth; Rasmus Pedersen; Frederik Rodenberg; Denmark	Filippo Ganna; Francesco Lamon; Jonathan Milan; Manlio Moro; Simone Consonni; Italy	Aaron Gate; Campbell Stewart; Thomas Sexton; Nick Kergozou; New Zealand
2024 Ballerup	Tobias Hansen; Carl-Frederik Bévort; Niklas Larsen; Frederik Madsen; Rasmus Pedersen; Denmark	Ethan Hayter; Josh Charlton; Charlie Tanfield; Oliver Wood; Rhys Britton; Great Britain	Tim Torn Teutenberg; Benjamin Boos; Ben Jochum; Bruno Keßler; Benjamin Boos; Germany
2025 Santiago	Tobias Hansen; Niklas Larsen; Frederik Madsen; Rasmus Pedersen; Lasse Norman Leth; Denmark	Oliver Bleddyn; Blake Agnoletto; Conor Leahy; James Moriarty; Liam Walsh; Australia	Thomas Sexton; Marshall Erwood; Keegan Hornblow; Nick Kergozou; New Zealand
2026 Shanghai	Carl-Frederik Bévort; Lasse Norman Leth; Frederik Madsen; Rasmus Pedersen; Tobias Hansen; Denmark	Filippo Ganna; Francesco Lamon; Alessio Magagnotti; Jonathan Milan; Italy	Noah Hobbs; Henry Hobbs; Ethan Vernon; Oliver Wood; Matthew Bostock; United Kingdom

== Medal table ==
Rank	Nation	Gold	Silver	Bronze	Total
1	Australia	13	3	4	20
2	Great Britain	6	11	4	21
3	Denmark	6	3	6	15
4	Italy	3	3	4	10
5	Germany	3	3	3	9
6	Ukraine	2	3	1	6
7	New Zealand	1	2	6	9
8	France	0	3	3	6
9	Russia	0	1	1	2
9	United States	0	1	1	2
11	Netherlands	0	1	0	1
12	Spain	0	0	1	1
Totals (12 entries)		34	34	34	102
