= World and Olympic records set at the 2000 Summer Olympics =

A number of world records and Olympic records were set in various events at the 2000 Summer Olympics in Sydney.

== Records by sport ==
=== Cycling ===
Event	Name	Nation	Time	Date	Record
Men's 1 km time trial	Jason Queally	Great Britain	1'01"609	16 September	OR
Men's individual pursuit	Robert Bartko	Germany	4'18"972	16 September	OR
Men's individual pursuit	Robert Bartko	Germany	4'18"515	16 September	OR
Men's team pursuit	Bryan Steel; Paul Manning; Bradley Wiggins; Chris Newton	Great Britain	4'04"030	18 September	OR
Men's team pursuit	Guido Fulst; Robert Bartko; Daniel Becke; Jens Lehmann	Germany	4'01"810	18 September	OR
Men's team pursuit	Oleksandr Fedenko; Oleksandr Symonenko; Sergiy Matveyev; Sergiy Chernyavskyy	Ukraine	4'00"830	19 September	WR, OR
Men's team pursuit	Guido Fulst; Robert Bartko; Daniel Becke; Jens Lehmann	Germany	3'59"710	19 September	WR, OR
Women's 500 m time trial	Felicia Ballanger	France	34"140	16 September	OR
Women's individual pursuit	Leontien Zijlaard	Netherlands	3'31"570	17 September	OR
Women's individual pursuit	Leontien Zijlaard	Netherlands	3'30"816	17 September	WR, OR
