= Cycling at the 2000 Summer Olympics – Men's team pursuit =

The men's team pursuit event in cycling at the 2000 Summer Olympics was held on Sunday, 17 September, and Monday, 18 September 2000 at the Dunc Gray Velodrome. The competition consisted of matches between two teams of four cyclists. The teams started at opposite ends of the track. They had 16 laps (4 kilometres) in which to catch the other cyclist. If neither was caught before one had gone 16 laps, the times for the distance (based on the third rider of the team to cross the line) were used to determine the victor.

== Medalists ==
Gold	Silver	Bronze
Germany; Guido Fulst; Robert Bartko; Daniel Becke; Jens Lehmann	Ukraine; Serhii Cherniavskyi; Serhiy Matvyeyev; Oleksandr Symonenko; Oleksandr Fedenko	Great Britain; Paul Manning; Chris Newton; Bryan Steel; Bradley Wiggins

== Records ==
World and Olympic records prior to the Games.
World Record	4:00.958	Italy	Manchester, Great Britain	31 August 1996
Olympic Record	4:05.930	France	Atlanta, USA	27 July 1996

== Results ==
- Q denotes qualification by place in heat.
- q denotes qualification by overall place.
- DNS denotes did not start.
- DNF denotes did not finish.
- DQ denotes disqualification.
- NR denotes national record.
- OR denotes Olympic record.
- WR denotes world record.
- PB denotes personal best.
- SB denotes season best.

=== Qualifying round ===
Held 18 September For the qualifying round, teams did not face each other. Instead, they raced the 4000 metres by themselves. The top eight times qualified for the first competition round, with the other two teams receiving a rank based on their time in this round.

Rank	Team	Names	Time	Qualification	Record
1	Great Britain	Bryan Steel; Paul Manning; Bradley Wiggins; Chris Newton	4:04.030	q	OR
2	Ukraine	Oleksandr Fedenko; Oleksandr Symonenko; Serhiy Matvyeyev; Serhii Cherniavskyi	4:04.078	q	
3	France	Cyril Bos; Philippe Ermenault; Francis Moreau; Jerome Neuville	4:05.155	q	
4	Germany	Guido Fulst; Olaf Pollack; Daniel Becke; Jens Lehmann	4:05.750	q	
5	Australia	Brett Aitken; Graeme Brown; Brett Lancaster; Michael Rogers	4:06.361	q	
6	New Zealand	Tim Carswell; Lee Vertongen; Gary Anderson; Greg Henderson	4:08.463	q	
7	Netherlands	John den Braber; Robert Slippens; Jens Mouris; Wilco Zuijderwijk	4:09.590	q	
8	Russia	Vladimir Karpets; Alexey Markov; Vladislav Borisov; Denis Smyslov	4:09.910	q	
9	Argentina	Walter Fernando Perez; Edgardo Simón; Gonzalo Martin Garcia; Guillermo Brunetta	4:10.940		
10	United States	Derek Bouchard-Hall; Mariano Friedick; Tommy Mulkey; Erin Hartwell	4:12.494		
11	Italy	Mario Benetton; Adler Capelli; Cristiano Citton; Marco Villa	4:15.451		
12	Spain	Miguel Alzamora; Isaac Gálvez; Antonio Tauler; José Francisco Jarque	4:15.547		

=== Match round- Quarter Finals ===
Held 18 September.
In the first round of match competition, teams were seeded into matches based on their times from the qualifying round. The fastest team faced the eighth-fastest, the second-fastest faced the third, and so forth. Winners advanced to the finals while losers in each match received a final ranking based on their time in the round.

Heat 1

Germany	Guido Fulst, Robert Bartko, Daniel Becke, Jens Lehmann	4:01.810	Q	OR	(4th)
Australia	Brett Aitken, Graeme Brown; Brett Lancaster, Michael Rogers	4:03.209			(5th)

Heat 2

France	Cyril Bos, Philippe Ermenault; Francis Moreau, Jerome Neuville	4:05.224	Q	(3rd)
New Zealand	Tim Carswell, Lee Vertongen; Gary Anderson, Greg Henderson	4:06.495		(6th)

Heat 3

Ukraine	Oleksandr Fedenko, Oleksandr Symonenko; Serhiy Matvyeyev, Serhii Cherniavskyi	4:03.359	Q	(2nd)
Netherlands	John den Braber, Robert Slippens; Jens Mouris, Wilco Zuijderwijk	lapped		(7th)

Heat 4

Great Britain	Bryan Steel, Paul Manning; Bradley Wiggins, Chris Newton	4:04.143	Q	(1st)
Russia	Vladimir Karpets, Alexey Markov; Vladislav Borisov, Denis Smyslov	lapped		(8th)

=== Match round- Semi-Finals ===
Held 19 September.

Winners advanced to the medal round while losers in each match received a final ranking based on their time in the round.

Heat 1

Ukraine	Oleksandr Fedenko, Oleksandr Symonenko; Serhiy Matvyeyev, Serhii Cherniavskyi	4:00.830	Q	WR	(2nd)
Great Britain	Jon Clay, Paul Manning; Bradley Wiggins, Rob Hayles	4:02.387			(3rd)

Heat 2

Germany	Guido Fulst, Robert Bartko, Daniel Becke, Jens Lehmann	4:05.930	Q	(1st)
France	Cyril Bos, Philippe Ermenault; Francis Moreau, Jerome Neuville	4:11.549		(4th)

=== Medal round ===
Held 19 September Teams were again re-seeded, this time based on their times in the match round. The third- and fourth-fastest teams faced off in the bronze medal match, while the fastest two teams competed for the gold and silver medals.

Bronze medal match

Great Britain	Bryan Steel, Paul Manning; Bradley Wiggins, Chris Newton	4:01.979
France	Cyril Bos, Philippe Ermenault; Francis Moreau, Jerome Neuville	4:05.991

Gold medal match

Germany	Guido Fulst, Robert Bartko, Daniel Becke, Jens Lehmann	3:59.710
Ukraine	Oleksandr Fedenko, Oleksandr Symonenko; Serhiy Matvyeyev, Serhii Cherniavskyi	4:04.520

== Final classification ==
The final classification was:

1. Germany
2. Ukraine
3. Great Britain
4. France
5. Australia
6. New Zealand
7. Netherlands
8. Russia
