= Cycling at the 2000 Summer Olympics – Men's individual pursuit =

Cycling at the Olympics

These are the official results of the Men's Individual Pursuit at the 2000 Summer Olympics in Sydney, Australia. The races were held on Saturday, 16 September, and Sunday, 17 September 2000 at the Dunc Gray Velodromewith a race distance of 4 km.

== Medalists ==
Gold	Silver	Bronze
Robert Bartko, Germany	Jens Lehmann, Germany	Brad McGee, Australia

== Records ==
World and Olympic records prior to the Games.

World Record	4:11.114	Chris Boardman	GBR	Manchester, Great Britain	29 August 1996
Olympic Record	4:19.699	Andrea Collinelli	ITA	Atlanta, USA	24 July 1996

=== Qualifying round ===
16 September

The seventeen riders raced against each other in matches of two. Qualification for the next round was not based on who won those matches, however. The cyclists with the four fastest times advanced, regardless of whether they won or lost their match.

Rank	Name	Nation	Time
1	Robert Bartko	Germany	4:18.972
2	Rob Hayles	Great Britain	4:20.996
3	Jens Lehmann	Germany	4:21.350
4	Brad McGee	Australia	4:21.903
5	Philippe Gaumont	France	4:22.142
6	Oleksandr Symonenko	Ukraine	4:23.983
7	Sergiy Matveyev	Ukraine	4:25.380
8	Walter Fernando Perez	Argentina	4:30.757
9	Luke Roberts	Australia	4:31.162
10	Mariano Friedick	United States	4:31.241
11	Vladimir Karpets	Russia	4:31.342
12	Christian Vande Velde	United States	4:31.528
13	Alexey Markov	Russia	4:31.589
14	Gary Anderson	New Zealand	4:32.304
15	Franco Marvulli	Switzerland	4:34.000
16	Antonio Tauler	Spain	4:34.415
17	Vadim Kravchenko	Kazakhstan	4:40.410

=== Semi-finals ===
Held 16 September

In the first round of actual match competition, cyclists were seeded into matches based on their times from the qualifying round. The fastest cyclist faced the fourth-fastest and the second-fastest faced the third. Winners advanced to the finals while losers met in the bronze-medal match.

Heat 1

Jens Lehmann Germany	4:23.032	(3rd)
Rob Hayles Great Britain	4:30.080	(2nd)

Heat 2

Robert Bartko Germany	4:21.067	(1st)
Brad McGee Australia	4:22.644	(4th)

=== Finals ===
Held 17 September

Gold Medal

Robert Bartko Germany	4:18.515
Jens Lehmann Germany	4:23.824

Bronze Medal

Brad McGee Australia	4:19.250
Rob Hayles Great Britain	4:19.613
