= Cycling at the 2000 Summer Olympics =

Cycling at the Games of the XXVII Olympiad
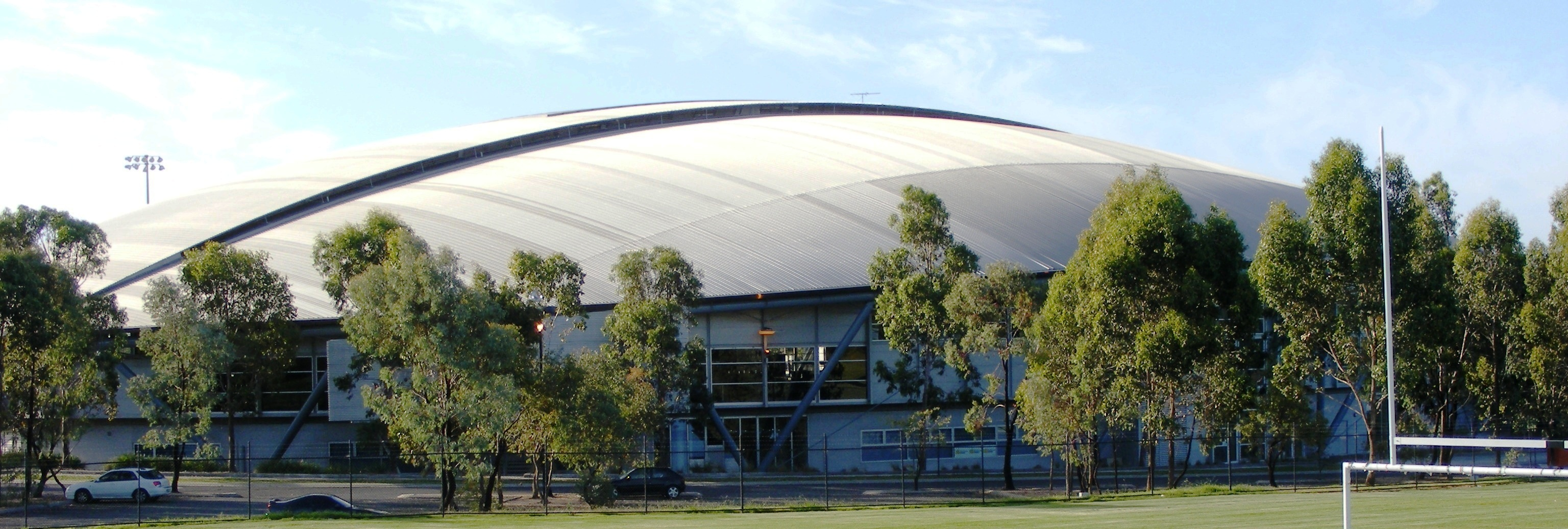
- The Dunc Gray Velodrome
- Venues: Western Sydney Parklands; Sydney and surrounding area Dunc Gray Velodrome
- Date: 16–20 September 2000
- Competitors: 462 from 55 nations

Cycling at the 2000 Summer Olympics, 3 different bicycle racing disciplines were contested: Road cycling, track cycling, and mountain biking.

== Road cycling ==
Games	Gold	Silver	Bronze
Men's road race	Jan Ullrich; Germany	Alexander Vinokourov; Kazakhstan	Andreas Klöden; Germany
Men's time trial	Viatcheslav Ekimov; Russia	Jan Ullrich; Germany	Vacated (Note: On 17 January 2013, Lance Armstrong was stripped of the bronze medal and disqualified by the International Olympic Committee for an anti-doping rule violation. The IOC also decided to not award Spanish cyclist Abraham Olano the medal, as he had also tested positive for doping, back in 1998.)
Women's road race	Leontien Zijlaard; Netherlands	Hanka Kupfernagel; Germany	Diana Žiliūtė; Lithuania
Women's time trial	Leontien Zijlaard; Netherlands	Mari Holden; United States	Jeannie Longo-Ciprelli; France

== Track cycling ==
=== Men ===
Games	Gold	Silver	Bronze
Keirin	Florian Rousseau; France	Gary Neiwand; Australia	Jens Fiedler; Germany
Madison	Australia; Brett Aitken; Scott McGrory	Belgium; Etienne De Wilde; Matthew Gilmore	Italy; Silvio Martinello; Marco Villa
Points race	Juan Llaneras; Spain	Milton Wynants; Uruguay	Alexey Markov; Russia
Individual pursuit	Robert Bartko; Germany	Jens Lehmann; Germany	Bradley McGee; Australia
Team pursuit	Germany; Guido Fulst; Robert Bartko; Daniel Becke; Jens Lehmann; Olaf Pollack	Ukraine; Serhii Cherniavskyi; Serhiy Matvyeyev; Oleksandr Symonenko; Oleksandr Fedenko	Great Britain; Paul Manning; Chris Newton; Bryan Steel; Bradley Wiggins; Jon Clay; Rob Hayles
Individual sprint	Marty Nothstein; United States	Florian Rousseau; France	Jens Fiedler; Germany
Team sprint	France; Florian Rousseau; Arnaud Tournant; Laurent Gané	Great Britain; Chris Hoy; Craig MacLean; Jason Queally	Australia; Gary Neiwand; Sean Eadie; Darryn Hill
Time trial	Jason Queally; Great Britain	Stefan Nimke; Germany	Shane Kelly; Australia

=== Women ===
Games	Gold	Silver	Bronze
Points race	Antonella Bellutti; Italy	Leontien Zijlaard; Netherlands	Olga Slioussareva; Russia
Individual pursuit	Leontien Zijlaard; Netherlands	Marion Clignet; France	Yvonne McGregor; Great Britain
Sprint	Félicia Ballanger; France	Oksana Grishina; Russia	Iryna Yanovych; Ukraine
Time trial	Félicia Ballanger; France	Michelle Ferris; Australia	Jiang Cuihua; China

== Mountain biking ==
Games	Gold	Silver	Bronze
Men's	Miguel Martinez; France	Filip Meirhaeghe; Belgium	Christoph Sauser; Switzerland
Women's	Paola Pezzo; Italy	Barbara Blatter; Switzerland	Margarita Fullana; Spain

== Medal table ==
Rank	Nation	Gold	Silver	Bronze	Total
1	France	5	2	1	8
2	Germany	3	4	3	10
3	Netherlands	3	1	0	4
4	Italy	2	0	1	3
5	Australia	1	2	3	6
6	Great Britain	1	1	2	4
6	Russia	1	1	2	4
8	United States	1	1	0	2
9	Spain	1	0	1	2
10	Belgium	0	2	0	2
11	Switzerland	0	1	1	2
11	Ukraine	0	1	1	2
13	Kazakhstan	0	1	0	1
13	Uruguay	0	1	0	1
15	China	0	0	1	1
15	Lithuania	0	0	1	1
Totals (16 entries)		18	18	17	53

== Records broken ==
Event	Name	Nation	Score	Date	Record
Men's 1 km time trial	Jason Queally	Great Britain	1'01"609	16 September	OR
Men's individual pursuit	Robert Bartko	Germany	4'18"972	16 September	OR
Men's individual pursuit	Robert Bartko	Germany	4'18"515	16 September	OR
Men's team pursuit	Bryan Steel; Paul Manning; Bradley Wiggins; Chris Newton	Great Britain	4'04"030	18 September	OR
Men's team pursuit	Guido Fulst; Robert Bartko; Daniel Becke; Jens Lehmann	Germany	4'01"810	18 September	OR
Men's team pursuit	Oleksandr Fedenko; Oleksandr Symonenko; Sergiy Matveyev; Sergiy Chernyavskyy	Ukraine	4'00"830	19 September	WR, OR
Men's team pursuit	Guido Fulst; Robert Bartko; Daniel Becke; Jens Lehmann	Germany	3'59"710	19 September	WR, OR
Women's 500 m time trial	Felicia Ballanger	France	34"140	16 September	OR
Women's individual pursuit	Leontien Zijlaard	Netherlands	3'31"570	17 September	OR
Women's individual pursuit	Leontien Zijlaard	Netherlands	3'30"816	17 September	WR, OR

OR = Olympic record, WR = World record
