= Aivaras Baranauskas =

Lithuanian cyclist

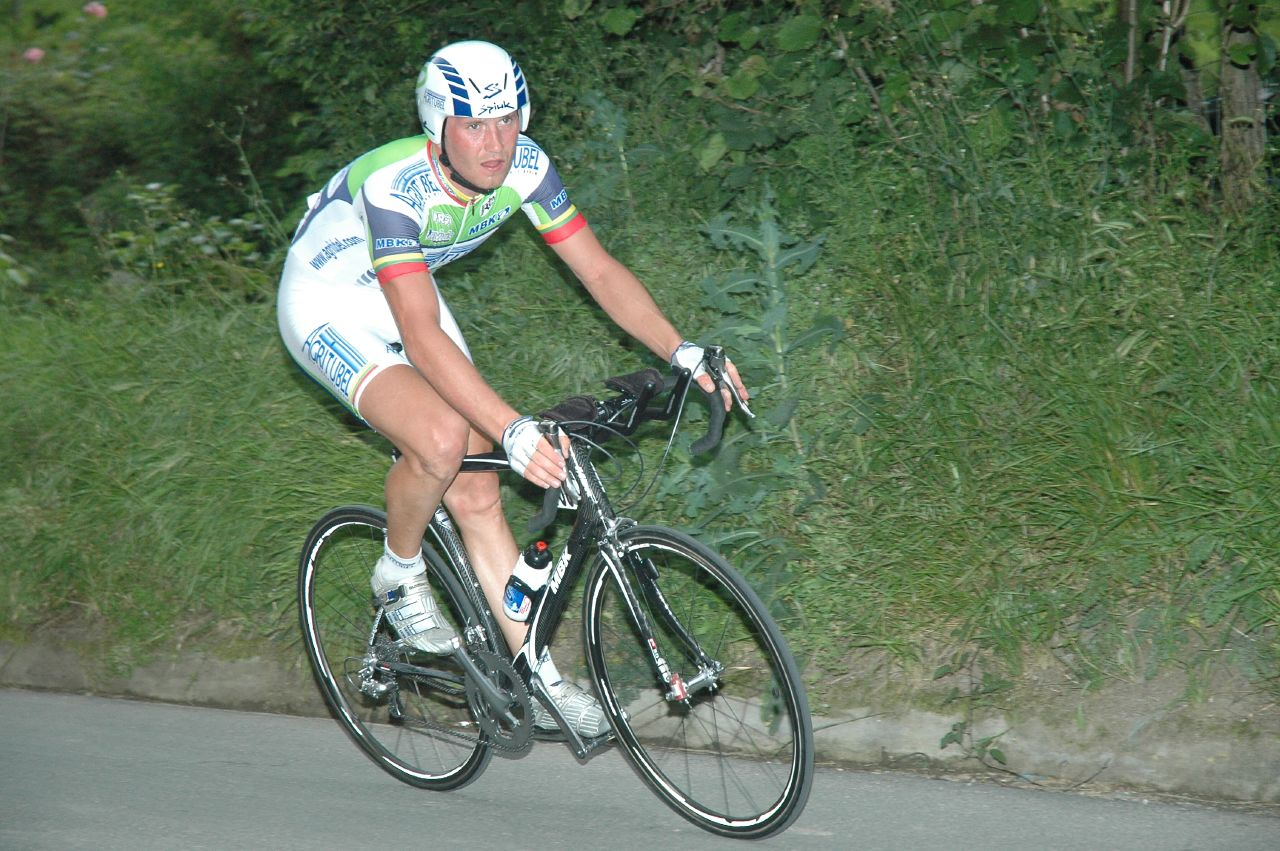

Personal information
- Full name: Aivaras Baranauskas
- Born: 6 April 1980 (age 46) Alytus, Lithuanian SSR, Soviet Union
- Height: 1.89 m (6 ft 2 in)
- Weight: 85 kg (187 lb)

Cycling career
- Sport: Cycling
- Discipline: Track
- Role: Rider
- Rider type: Pursuit

Professional teams
- 2005: Agritubel–Loudun
- 2006–2007: Agritubel
- 2008: Roubaix–Lille Métropole

Major wins
- Lithuanian Road Cycling Championships (2005)
Medal record
Men's track cycling
Representing Lithuania
European Championships
Silver medal – second place	2001 Fiorenzuola	Team pursuit

Aivaras Baranauskas (born 6 April 1980) is a retired Lithuanian professional track cyclist. He represented his nation Lithuania as part of the men's track pursuit team at the 2004 Summer Olympics, and has also earned the men's road race title at the Lithuanian Championships in Ignalina, before turning himself into a certified pro road rider in late 2005. During his sporting career, Baranauskas raced for Agritubel–Loudun, Agritubel, and Roubaix–Lille Métropole pro cycling teams.

Baranauskas qualified for the Lithuanian squad in the men's team pursuit at the 2004 Summer Olympics in Athens based on the nation's selection process from the UCI Track World Rankings. He delivered the Lithuanian foursome of Linas Balčiūnas, Ignatas Konovalovas, and Raimondas Vilčinskas an eighth-place time of 4:08.812 in the prelims before his team was later relegated and overlapped to an aggressive Aussie squad of Graeme Brown, Brett Lancaster, Brad McGee, and Luke Roberts in the fourth match round.

== Career highlights ==
2001
1st Prologue, Internatie Reningelst, Reningelst (BEL)
(silver) European U23 Championships (Team pursuit), Fiorenzuola (ITA)
2003
1st Stage 11, Vuelta a las Americas, Aguascalientes (MEX)
2nd Stage 1, Ronde van Zuid-Oost Friesland, Erwetegem (NED)
3rd Lithuanian Championships (Road), Lithuania
2004
(gold) UCI World Cup (Team pursuit), Moscow (RUS)
1st Stage 2, Tour of Bulgaria, Razgrad (BUL)
2nd Stage 5, Tour of Bulgaria, Bulgaria
3rd Lithuanian Championships (Road), Lithuania
8th Olympic Games (Team pursuit), Athens (GRE)
2005
1st Lithuanian Championships (Road), Ignalina (LTU)
1st Prologue, Grand Prix de la ville de Pérenchies, Pérenchies (FRA)
2nd Tour du Labourd, France
2nd Stage 4, Tour de la Province de Namur, Florennes (BEL)
3rd Stage 4, Boucles de la Mayenne, Laval (FRA)
2006
2nd Stage 5, 3-Länder-Tour, Frankfurt (GER)
3rd Stage 5, Tour Méditerranéen, Hyères (FRA)
2007
2nd Stage 3, Vuelta a Burgos, Aranda de Duero (ESP)
2008
1st Prologue, Beuvry-la-Forêt, France
