= 2002 UCI Track Cycling World Championships =

Cycling world championships

- Venue: Ballerup, Denmark
- Date: September 25–29, 2002
- Velodrome: Siemens Arena
- Events: 15

The 2002 UCI Track Cycling World Championships were the World Championship for track cycling. They took place in Ballerup, Denmark from September 25 to September 29, 2002.

== Medal table ==
Rank	Nation	Gold	Silver	Bronze	Total
1	Australia (AUS)	4	5	4	13
2	Great Britain (GBR)	3	1	1	5
3	Belarus (BLR)	2	0	0	2
4	France (FRA)	1	2	1	4
5	Russia (RUS)	1	1	1	3
6	Czech Republic (CZE)	1	1	0	2
7	China (CHN)	1	0	0	1
7	Netherlands (NED)	1	0	0	1
7	Switzerland (SUI)	1	0	0	1
10	Austria (AUT)	0	2	0	2
11	Germany (GER)	0	1	5	6
12	Mexico (MEX)	0	1	0	1
12	Spain (ESP)	0	1	0	1
14	Argentina (ARG)	0	0	2	2
15	Italy (ITA)	0	0	1	1
Totals (15 entries)		15	15	15	45

== Medal summary ==
Event	Gold		Silver		Bronze	
Men's Events
Men's sprint	Sean Eadie; Australia		Jobie Dajka; Australia		Florian Rousseau; France	
Men's 1 km time trial	Chris Hoy; Great Britain	1:01.893	Arnaud Tournant; France	1:01.894	Shane Kelly; Australia	1:02.128
Men's individual pursuit	Bradley McGee; Australia		Luke Roberts; Australia		Jens Lehmann; Germany	
Men's team pursuit	Peter Dawson; Brett Lancaster; Stephen Wooldridge; Luke Roberts; Mark Renshaw _{(qualifying rounds only, but still classed as World Champion)} Australia		Chris Bach; Guido Fulst; Sebastian Siedler; Jens Lehmann; Germany		Chris Newton; Paul Manning; Bradley Wiggins; Bryan Steel; Great Britain	
Men's team sprint	Jamie Staff; Chris Hoy; Craig MacLean; Great Britain		Ryan Bayley; Jobie Dajka; Sean Eadie; Australia		Jens Fiedler; Sören Lausberg; Carsten Bergemann; Germany	
Men's keirin	Jobie Dajka; Australia		José Antonio Villanueva; Spain		René Wolff; Germany	
Men's scratch	Franco Marvulli; Switzerland		Tony Gibb; Great Britain		Stefan Steinweg; Germany	
Men's points race	Chris Newton; Great Britain	76	Franz Stocher; Austria	50	Juan Curuchet; Argentina	49
Men's madison	Jérôme Neuville; Franck Perque; France	5	Roland Garber; Franz Stocher; Austria	18 (-1 lap)	Juan Curuchet; Edgardo Simón; Argentina	17 (-1 lap)
Women's Events
Women's sprint	Natallia Tsylinskaya; Belarus		Kerrie Meares; Australia		Katrin Meinke; Germany	
Women's 500 m time trial	Natallia Tsylinskaya; Belarus	34.838	Nancy Contreras Reyes; Mexico	34.898	Kerrie Meares; Australia	34.964
Women's individual pursuit	Leontien Zijlaard-van Moorsel; Netherlands		Olga Sliusareva; Russia		Katherine Bates; Australia	
Women's keirin	Li Na; China		Clara Sanchez; France		Rosealee Hubbard; Australia	
Women's scratch	Lada Kozlíková; Czech Republic		Rochelle Gilmore; Australia		Olga Sliusareva; Russia	
Women's points race	Olga Sliusareva; Russia	35	Lada Kozlíková; Czech Republic	23	Vera Carrara; Italy	20
