= Cycling at the 2004 Summer Olympics – Men's team pursuit =

Men's team pursuit at the Games of the XXVIII Olympiad
- Venue: Olympic Velodrome, Athens
- Competitors: 44 from 10 nations
- Winning time: 3:58.233

Medalists
1st place, gold medalist(s)		Australia; Graeme Brown, Peter Dawson, Brett Lancaster, Brad McGee, Luke Roberts, Stephen Wooldridge
2nd place, silver medalist(s)		Great Britain; Steve Cummings, Paul Manning, Chris Newton, Bryan Steel
3rd place, bronze medalist(s)		Spain; Carlos Castaño, Sergi Escobar, Asier Maeztu, Carlos Torrent

The men's team pursuit event in cycling at the 2004 Summer Olympics consisted of matches between two teams of four cyclists. The teams started at opposite ends of the track. They had 16 laps (4 kilometres) in which to catch the other cyclist. If neither was caught before one had gone 16 laps, the times for the distance (based on the third rider of the team to cross the line) were used to determine the victor. The Australia-Great Britain rivalry continued in an event which saw a new world record.

== Medalists ==
Gold	Silver	Bronze
Australia; Graeme Brown; Peter Dawson; Brett Lancaster; Brad McGee; Luke Roberts; Stephen Wooldridge	Great Britain; Steve Cummings; Rob Hayles; Paul Manning; Bradley Wiggins	Spain; Carlos Castaño; Sergi Escobar; Asier Maeztu; Carlos Torrent

== Results ==
=== Qualifying round ===
For the qualifying round, teams did not face each other. Instead, they raced the 4000 metres by themselves. The top eight times qualified for the first competition round, with the other two teams receiving a rank based on their time in this round.

Rank	Team	Names	Time
1	Australia	Graeme Brown; Peter Dawson; Brett Lancaster; Stephen Wooldridge	4:00.613 Q
2	Great Britain	Steve Cummings; Paul Manning; Chris Newton; Bryan Steel	4:03.985 Q
3	Spain	Carlos Castaño; Sergi Escobar; Asier Maeztu; Carlos Torrent	4:04.421 Q
4	Germany	Robert Bartko; Guido Fulst; Christian Lademann; Leif Lampater	4:05.823 Q
5	Netherlands	Levi Heimans; Jens Mouris; Peter Schep; Jeroen Straathof	4:06.286 Q
6	Ukraine	Volodymyr Dyudya; Roman Kononenko; Sergiy Matveyev; Vitaliy Popkov	4:07.175 Q
7	France	Mathieu Ladagnous; Anthony Langella; Jérôme Neuville; Fabien Sanchez	4:07.336 Q
8	Lithuania	Linas Balčiūnas; Aivaras Baranauskas; Tomas Vaitkus; Raimondas Vilčinskas	4:08.812 Q
9	Russia	Vladislav Borisov; Alexander Khatuntsev; Alexei Markov; Andrey Minashkin	4:09.394
10	New Zealand	Hayden Godfrey; Peter Latham; Matthew Randall; Marc Ryan	4:10.820

=== Match round ===
In the first round of match competition, teams were seeded into matches based on their times from the qualifying round. The fastest team faced the eighth-fastest, the second-fastest faced the third, and so forth. Winners advanced to the finals while losers in each match received a final ranking based on their time in the round.

Heat 1

Germany	4:03.785 Q	(4th)
Netherlands	4:04.605	(5th)

Heat 2

Spain	4:02.374 Q	(3rd)
Ukraine	4:05.266	(6th)

Heat 3

Great Britain	3:59.866 Q	(2nd)
France	lapped	(7th)

Heat 4

Australia set a world record time in this match.

Australia	3:56.610 Q	(1st)
Lithuania	lapped	(8th)

=== Medal round ===
Teams were again re-seeded, this time based on their times in the match round. The third- and fourth-fastest teams faced off in the bronze medal match, while the fastest two teams competed for the gold and silver medals.

Bronze medal match

Spain	4:05.523
Germany	4:07.193

Gold medal match

Australia	3:58.233
Great Britain	4:01.760

== Final classification ==
The final results are:

1. Australia
2. Great Britain
3. Spain
4. Germany
5. Netherlands
6. Ukraine
7. France
8. Lithuania
9. Russia
10. New Zealand
