= List of Austrian records in track cycling =

This is a list of national records in track cycling in Austria, maintained by the Austrian Cycling Federation (in German, Österreichischer Radsport-Verband).

== Men ==
Event	Record	Athlete	Date	Meet	Place	Ref
Flying 200m time trial	10.44	Christian Meidlinger	28 September 1995	World Championships	Bogotá, Colombia	
Flying 500m time trial	26.581	Clemens Selzer	15 September 2009		Vienna, Austria	
1km time trial	1:02.76	Christian Meidlinger	26 September 1995	World Championships	Bogotá, Colombia	
1km time trial (sea level)	1:03.862	Clemens Selzer	29 September 2009		Vienna, Austria	
Team sprint	48.921	Valentin Götzinger; Michael Holland; Christian Rammer	15 December 2017		Vienna, Austria	
4000m individual pursuit	4:22.742	Daniel Aurer	21 January 2022		Anadia, Portugal	
4000m team pursuit	4:16.31	Fritz Berein; Werner Riebenbauer; Franz Stocher; Roland Wafler	13 July 1994		Vienna, Austria	
Hour record	51.852 km	Matthias Brändle	30 October 2014		Aigle, Switzerland	

== Women ==
Event	Record	Athlete	Date	Meet	Place	Ref
Flying 200m time trial	11.922	Pelin Cizgin	1 October 2010		Aigle, Switzerland	
Flying 500m time trial	32.265	Pelin Cizgin	21 September 2010		Vienna, Austria	
500m time trial	37.470	Pelin Cizgin	11 November 2011	Grand Prix Vienna	Vienna, Austria	
Team sprint	39.198	Pelin Cizgin; Elisabeth Reiner	20 October 2010		Vienna, Austria	
3000m individual pursuit	3:47.471	Christiane Soeder	20 January 2007	World Cup	Los Angeles, United States	
4000m individual pursuit	4:55.379	Leila Gschwentner	15 February 2025	European Championships	Heusden-Zolder, Belgium	
4000m team pursuit						
Hour record						
