= 2001 UCI Track Cycling World Championships =

Cycling world championships

- Venue: Antwerp, Belgium
- Date: September 26–30, 2001
- Velodrome: Antwerps Sportpaleis
- Events: 12

The 2001 UCI Track Cycling World Championships were the World Championship for track cycling. They took place in Antwerp, Belgium from September 26 to September 30, 2001.

== Medal table ==
Rank	Nation	Gold	Silver	Bronze	Total
1	France (FRA)	4	2	1	7
2	Russia (RUS)	2	1	1	4
3	Ukraine (UKR)	2	0	0	2
4	Australia (AUS)	1	2	0	3
5	Mexico (MEX)	1	0	1	2
6	Netherlands (NED)	1	0	0	1
6	Switzerland (SUI)	1	0	0	1
8	Germany (GER)	0	2	4	6
9	Argentina (ARG)	0	1	1	2
9	Canada (CAN)	0	1	1	2
9	Great Britain (GBR)	0	1	1	2
12	Spain (ESP)	0	1	0	1
12	United States (USA)	0	1	0	1
14	Austria (AUT)	0	0	1	1
14	Poland (POL)	0	0	1	1
Totals (15 entries)		12	12	12	36

== Medal summary ==
Event	Gold		Silver		Bronze	
Men's Events
Men's sprint	Arnaud Tournant; France		Laurent Gané; France		Florian Rousseau; France	
Men's 1 km time trial	Arnaud Tournant; France	1:02.571	Sören Lausberg; Germany	1:03.363	Grzegorz Krejner; Poland	1:03.567
Men's individual pursuit	Alexander Symonenko; Ukraine		Jens Lehmann; Germany		Stefan Steinweg; Germany	
Men's team pursuit	Serhiy Cherniavskiy; Olexander Fedenko; Alexander Symonenko; Lyubomyr Polatayko; Ukraine		Chris Newton; Paul Manning; Bradley Wiggins; Bryan Steel; Great Britain		Christian Bach; Guido Fulst; Sebastian Siedler; Jens Lehmann; Germany	
Men's team sprint	Laurent Gané; Florian Rousseau; Arnaud Tournant; France		Jobie Dajka; Ryan Bayley; Sean Eadie; Australia		Craig MacLean; Jason Queally; Chris Hoy; Great Britain	
Men's keirin	Ryan Bayley; Australia		Laurent Gané; France		Jens Fiedler; Germany	
Men's points race	Bruno Risi; Switzerland	29	Juan Curuchet; Argentina	23	Franz Stocher; Austria	17
Men's madison	Jérôme Neuville; Robert Sassone; France	5	Isaac Gálvez; Joan Llaneras; Spain	10 (-1 lap)	Juan Curuchet; Gabriel Curuchet; Argentina	9 (-1 lap)
Women's Events
Women's sprint	Svetlana Grankovskaya; Russia		Tammy Thomas; United States		Lori-Ann Muenzer; Canada	
Women's 500 m time trial	Nancy Contreras; Mexico	34.996	Lori-Ann Muenzer; Canada	35.151	Katrin Meinke; Germany	35.356
Women's individual pursuit	Leontien Zijlaard-Van Moorsel; Netherlands		Olga Sliusareva; Russia		Elena Tchalikh; Russia	
Women's points race	Olga Sliusareva; Russia	21	Katherine Bates; Australia	14	Belem Guerrero; Mexico	5
