= Andrey Minashkin =

Russian cyclist

Personal information
- Born: 8 June 1976 (age 50) Moscow, Russia

Cycling career
- Sport: Cycling

Andrey Minashkin (born 8 June 1976) is a Russian cyclist. He competed in the men's team pursuit at the 2004 Summer Olympics.
