= Zach Conrad =

American racing cyclist

Personal information
- Full name: Zachary Conrad
- Born: 11 October 1975 (age 51) Fort Collins, Colorado

Cycling career
- Sport: Cycling
- Current team: Retired
- Disciplines: Track; Road
- Role: Rider

Professional teams
- 1997: Die Continentale–Olympia
- 1998: Colorado Cyclist–Ikon
Medal record
Representing United States
Men's track cycling
World Championships
| Bronze medal – third place | 1995 Bogota | Team pursuit |

Zachary Conrad (born October 11, 1975) is an American former professional racing cyclist. He won a bronze medal in the team pursuit at the 1995 UCI Track Cycling World Championships.
