= List of Olympic Games records in track cycling =

This is a list of Olympic records in track cycling.

== Men's records ==
♦ denotes a performance that is also a current world record. Statistics are correct as of 7 August 2024.

Event	Record	Athlete	Nationality	Date	Meet	Place	Ref
Flying 200 m time trial (progression)	9.088	Harrie Lavreysen	Netherlands	7 August 2024	2024 Olympic Games	Saint-Quentin-en-Yvelines, France	
1 km time trial (progression)	1:00.711	Chris Hoy	Great Britain	20 August 2004	2004 Olympic Games	Athens, Greece	
Team sprint (progression)	♦40.949	Jeffrey Hoogland; Harrie Lavreysen; Roy van den Berg	Netherlands	6 August 2024	2024 Olympic Games	Saint-Quentin-en-Yvelines, France	
4000 m individual pursuit (progression)	4:14.982	Lasse Norman Hansen	Denmark	14 August 2016	2016 Olympic Games	Rio de Janeiro, Brazil	
4000 m team pursuit (progression)	3:40.730	Oliver Bleddyn; Sam Welsford; Conor Leahy; Kelland O'Brien	Australia	6 August 2024	2024 Olympic Games	Saint-Quentin-en-Yvelines, France	

== Women's records ==
♦ denotes a performance that is also a current world record. Statistics are correct as of 9 August 2024.

Event	Record	Athlete	Nationality	Date	Meet	Place	Ref
Flying 200 m time trial (progression)	10.029	Lea Friedrich	Germany	9 August 2024	2024 Olympic Games	Saint-Quentin-en-Yvelines, France	
500 m time trial (progression)	33.952	Anna Meares	Australia	20 August 2004	2004 Olympic Games	Athens, Greece	
Team sprint (500 m) (progression)	♦31.804	Bao Shanju; Zhong Tianshi	China	2 August 2021	2020 Olympic Games	Izu, Japan	
Team sprint (750 m) (progression)	♦45.186	Katy Marchant; Emma Finucane; Sophie Capewell	Great Britain	5 August 2024	2024 Olympic Games	Saint-Quentin-en-Yvelines, France	
3000 m individual pursuit (progression)	3:24.537	Sarah Ulmer	New Zealand	22 August 2004	2004 Olympic Games	Athens, Greece	
3000 m team pursuit* (progression)	♦3:14.051	Dani King; Laura Trott; Joanna Rowsell	Great Britain	4 August 2012	2012 Olympic Games	London, Great Britain	
4000 m team pursuit* (progression)	4:04.242	Franziska Brauße; Lisa Brennauer; Lisa Klein; Mieke Kröger	Germany	3 August 2021	2020 Olympic Games	Izu, Japan	

* In 2016, the 3000 m team pursuit with 3 riders will be replaced by a 4000 m team pursuit with 4 person riders.
