= Oleksandr Fedenko =

Ukrainian cyclist (born 1970)

Personal information
- Born: 20 December 1970 (age 55) Kyiv, Soviet Union
- Height: 1.80 m (5 ft 11 in)
- Weight: 69 kg (152 lb)

Cycling career
- Sport: Cycling
- Current team: Retired
- Disciplines: Road; Track
- Role: Rider

Professional teams
- 1999: De Nardi–Pasta Montegrappa
- 2000: Liquigas–Pata
- 2001: De Nardi–Pasta Montegrappa
Medal record
Representing Ukraine
Olympic Games
| Silver medal – second place | 2000 Sydney | Team pursuit |
World Championships
| Silver medal – second place | 1997 Perth | Team pursuit |
| Gold medal – first place | 1998 Bordeaux | Team pursuit |
| Gold medal – first place | 2001 Antwerp | Team pursuit |

Oleksandr Oleksandrovych Fedenko (Ukrainian: Олександр Олександрович Феденко; born 20 December 1970) is a Ukrainian retired cyclist. He competed in four road and track events at the 1996 and 2000 Summer Olympics and won a silver medal in the 4000 m team pursuit in 2000. In this discipline his team finished in seventh place at the 1996 Games and won two world titles in 1998 and 2001.

In road racing, he won the Tour de Serbie in 1995. The first coach for Olympics was Oleksandr Kulyk, which fell in battle in 2022 during the Russian invasion of Ukraine.

== Major results ==
=== Road ===
1995
1st Overall Tour de Serbie
1996
1st Stage 2 Tour de Beauce
2nd Giro del Belvedere
1997
1st Stage 3 Settimana Ciclistica Lombarda
1998
1st Trofeo Adolfo Leoni
1999
1st Road race, National Road Championships
5th Gran Premio della Liberazione
2000
2nd Time trial, National Road Championships
2001
3rd Poreč Trophy 4

=== Track ===
1997
2nd Team pursuit, UCI Track World Championships
1998
1st Team pursuit, UCI Track World Championships (with Alexander Symonenko, Sergiy Matveyev & Ruslan Pidgornyy)
2000
2nd (silver) Team pursuit, Summer Olympics (with Sergiy Chernyavsky, Alexander Symonenko & Sergiy Matveyev)
2001
1st Team pursuit, UCI Track World Championships (with Alexander Symonenko, Serhiy Cherniavskiy & Lyubomyr Polatayko)
