= Christian Bach (cyclist) =

German bicycle racer

Personal information
- Born: 22 March 1979 (age 47) Meiningen, East Germany

Cycling career
- Sport: Cycling
- Current team: Retired
- Disciplines: Road; Track
- Role: Rider

Professional teams
- 2006: Thüringer Energie Team
- 2007–2009: Continental Team Milram
Medal record
Representing Germany
Men's track cycling
World Championships
Silver medal – second place	2002 Ballerup	Team pursuit
Bronze medal – third place	2001 Antwerp	Team pursuit

Christian Bach (born 22 March 1979) is a German former professional racing cyclist. He most notably won the silver medal in the team pursuit at the 2002 UCI Track Cycling World Championships as well as a bronze medal in the same event the previous year.

== Major results ==
1997
UCI Junior Track World Championships

2nd Team pursuit
3rd Individual pursuit

1999
1st Team pursuit, National Track Championships
2001
1st Team pursuit, National Track Championships
3rd Team pursuit, UCI Track World Championships
2002
2nd Team pursuit, UCI Track World Championships
2003
1st Team pursuit, National Track Championships
2nd Team pursuit – Moscow, UCI World Cup Classics
2004
1st Team pursuit, National Track Championships
2005
3rd Team pursuit – Manchester, 2004–05 UCI World Cup Classics
