= Dirk Copeland =

American cyclist (born 1972)

Personal information
- Born: September 5, 1972 (age 54) Los Angeles, California, United States

Cycling career
- Sport: Cycling
- Discipline: Track
- Role: Rider
Medal record
Representing United States
Men's track cycling
World Championships
| Silver medal – second place | 1994 Palermo | Team pursuit |
| Bronze medal – third place | 1995 Bogotá | Team pursuit |

Dirk Copeland (born September 5, 1972) is an American former cyclist. He competed at the 1992 Summer Olympics and the 1996 Summer Olympics.
