= José Francisco Jarque =

Spanish cyclist

Personal information
- Born: 21 September 1971 (age 55) Castellón de la Plana, Spain

Cycling career
- Sport: Cycling

José Francisco Jarque (born 21 September 1971) is a Spanish cyclist. He competed in the men's team pursuit at the 2000 Summer Olympics.
