= Denis Smyslov =

Russian cyclist

Personal information
- Full name: Denis Alexandrovich Smyslov
- Born: 5 January 1979 (age 47): Leningrad, Russian SFSR, Soviet Union; (now Saint Petersburg, Russia)

Cycling career
- Sport: Cycling

Denis Alexandrovich Smyslov (Russian: Дени́с Алекса́ндрович Смысло́в; born 5 January 1979) is a Russian former professional cyclist, who currently works as a directeur sportif for the UCI Continental team Lokosphinx. He competed in the men's team pursuit at the 2000 Summer Olympics.
