= Vladislav Borisov (cyclist) =

Russian cyclist

Personal information
- Born: 5 September 1978 (age 48) Naryan-Mar, Russia

Cycling career
- Sport: Cycling
- Current team: Retired
- Disciplines: Road; Track
- Role: Rider

Professional teams
- 1998–1999: Lokosphinx
- 2001: Itera
- 2005–2006: Omnibike Dynamo Moscow
- 2007: Universal Caffè–Ecopetrol
- 2008: CK Windoor's–Pribram
- 2008–2011: Amore & Vita–McDonald's

Major wins
- National Road Race Championships (2007)
Medal record
Men's track cycling
Representing Russia
World Championships
| Bronze medal – third place | 1999 Berlin | Team pursuit |

Vladislav Vladimirovich Borisov (Russian: Владислав Владимирович Борисов; born 5 September 1978) is a Russian former cyclist. He competed in the team pursuit at the 2000 and 2004 Olympics.

In 2007 he won the Russian National Road Race Championships.

== Major results ==
1996
1st Points race, UCI Junior Track World Championships
1999
1st Stage 9 Vuelta al Táchira
3rd Team pursuit, UCI Track World Championships
2001
1st Stage 7 Tour de Pologne
3rd Memorial Manuel Galera
5th Circuito de Getxo
2002
4th Road race, National Road Championships
2003
National Road Championships

3rd Time trial
4th Road race

7th Overall Tour de Normandie
8th Overall Tour de Gironde
9th Boucle de l'Artois
2004
4th Overall Tour de Serbie
2005
1st Stage 1 Tour of Qinghai Lake
1st Stage 2 Okolo Slovenska
2nd Overall Five Rings of Moscow

1st Stage 4

3rd Time trial, National Road Championships
5th Overall Tour of South China Sea
9th Overall Paris–Corrèze

1st Stage 2

2006
3rd Memorial Oleg Dyachenko
7th Boucle de l'Artois
2007
National Road Championships

1st Road race
5th Time trial

2008
3rd Coppa Bernocchi
2009
4th Overall Univest Grand Prix

1st Stage 1 (TTT)

2010
2nd Trofeo Melinda
5th Coppa Agostoni
2011
1st Trophée de la Maison Royale, Challenge du Prince
