= Dmitri Tolstenkov =

Ukrainian track cyclist (born 1973)

Personal information
- Born: 3 November 1973 (age 52)

Cycling career
- Sport: Cycling
- Discipline: Track
- Role: Rider
Medal record
Representing Ukraine
Men's track cycling
World Championships
Silver medal – second place	1995 Bogota	Team pursuit

Dmitri Tolstenkov (Ukrainian: Дмитро Толстєнков; born 3 November 1973 in Donetsk) is a Ukrainian former track cyclist. He won a silver medal in the team pursuit at the 1995 UCI Track Cycling World Championships.
