= Luis Carlos Galán Velodrome =

Velodrome in Bogotá, Colombia

Velódromo Luis Carlos Galán
- Interactive map of Velódromo Luis Carlos Galán
- Location: Bogotá, Colombia
- Coordinates: 4°39′54.81″N 74°5′53.14″W
- Surface: Concrete

Construction
- Opened: 1995

The Velódromo Luis Carlos Galán is a velodrome in Bogotá, Colombia, it was built in 1995 and hosted the 1995 UCI Track Cycling World Championships.

The track is 333 metres (364 yd) long and made of concrete.

== See also ==
- List of cycling tracks and velodromes

Preceded by Velodromo Paolo Borsellino; Palermo	UCI Track Cycling World Championships; Venue; 1995	Succeeded by Manchester Velodrome; Manchester
