= 1995 UCI Track Cycling World Championships =

Sports event in Bogotá, Colombia

- Venue: Bogotá, Colombia
- Date: September 26–30, 1995
- Velodrome: Velódromo Luis Carlos Galán
- Events: 12

The 1995 UCI Track Cycling World Championships were the World Championship for track cycling. They took place in Bogotá, Colombia from September 26 to 30. Twelve events were contested, eight for the men and four for the women at the Velódromo Luis Carlos Galán. There were three events held at the championships for the first time: men's team sprint (women's team sprint followed in 2007), men's madison and women's 500 m time trial. They replaced the men's tandem and men's stayers events.

In the same period, the 1995 UCI Road World Championships were organized in Duitama, Colombia.

== Medal table ==
Rank	Nation	Gold	Silver	Bronze	Total
1	France (FRA)	3	2	2	7
2	Australia (AUS)	3	0	2	5
3	Italy (ITA)	2	3	1	6
4	Russia (RUS)	1	2	0	3
5	Germany (GER)	1	1	0	2
6	United States (USA)	1	0	3	4
7	Great Britain (GBR)	1	0	0	1
8	Argentina (ARG)	0	1	0	1
8	Canada (CAN)	0	1	0	1
8	Lithuania (LTU)	0	1	0	1
8	Ukraine (UKR)	0	1	0	1
12	Estonia (EST)	0	0	1	1
12	Kazakhstan (KAZ)	0	0	1	1
12	Norway (NOR)	0	0	1	1
12	Switzerland (SUI)	0	0	1	1
Totals (15 entries)		12	12	12	36

== Medal summary ==
Event	Gold	Silver	Bronze
Men's Events
Men's sprint	Darryn Hill; Australia	Curt Harnett; Canada	Frédéric Magné; France
Men's 1 km time trial	Shane Kelly; Australia	Florian Rousseau; France	Erin Hartwell; United States
Men's keirin	Frédéric Magné; France	Michael Hübner; Germany	Federico Paris; Italy
Men's team sprint	Jens Fiedler; Michael Hübner; Jan van Eijden; Germany	Benoit Vetu; Herve Thuet; Florian Rousseau; France	Marty Nothstein; Erin Hartwell; Bill Clay; United States
Men's madison	Silvio Martinello; Marco Villa; Italy	Gabriel Curuchet; Juan Curuchet; Argentina	Kurt Betschart; Bruno Risi; Switzerland
Men's points race	Silvio Martinello; Italy	Remigijus Lupeikis; Lithuania	Sergey Lavrenenko; Kazakhstan
Men's individual pursuit	Graeme Obree; Great Britain	Andrea Colinelli; Italy	Stuart O'Grady; Australia
Men's team pursuit	Bradley McGee; Stuart O'Grady; Rodney McGee; Tim O'Shannessy; Australia	Dimitri Tolstenkov; Bogdan Bondariew; Sergiy Matveyev; Alexander Symonenko; Ukraine	Mariano Friedick; Dirk Copeland; Zach Conrad; Matt Hamon; United States
Women's Events
Women's 500 m time trial	Félicia Ballanger; France	Galina Enukhina; Russia	Michelle Ferris; Australia
Women's sprint	Félicia Ballanger; France	Olga Slyusareva; Russia	Erika Salumäe; Estonia
Women's points race	Svetlana Samokhalova; Russia	Nada Cristofoli; Italy	Nathalie Lancien; France
Women's individual pursuit	Rebecca Twigg; United States	Antonella Bellutti; Italy	May-Britt Vaaland; Norway
