= Matt Hamon =

American cyclist (born 1968)

Personal information
- Full name: Matthew Hamon
- Born: September 3, 1968 (age 58) San Francisco, California, U.S.

Cycling career
- Sport: Cycling
- Discipline: Track
- Role: Rider
- Rider type: Pursuit
Medal record
Representing United States
Men's track cycling
World Championships
Bronze medal – third place	1995 Bogota	Team pursuit
Silver medal – second place	1994 Palermo, Sicily	Team pursuit

Matthew "Matt" Hamon (born September 3, 1968, in San Francisco) is a former American professional cyclist whose prime competitive years spanned from 1988–1996. He competed in the team pursuit at the 1992 Summer Olympics.

Hamon was a member to the US National Team in 1990, 1993–96 and a 1992 Olympian. His USA 4,000 meter Team Pursuit team finished second at the 1994 World Track Cycling Championships in Palermo, Sicily. This silver medal is the best finish by an American quartet in the 32-year history of World Championships. In 1995, his squad won a bronze medal at the World Track Cycling Championships in Bogota, Colombia.

He was a member of the 1996 U.S. Olympic Long Team. In 1992, he competed in the 4,000 meter USA Olympic Team Pursuit in Barcelona. Matt is a six-time National Champion (1991, 92, 93, 94, 95 and 1996). His squad set the American record in Team Pursuit with a time of 4:10.065 in 1995 in Paris. At the 1991 Pan American Games in Cuba Hamon's Team Pursuit team earned a silver medal.

After retiring from cycling in 1995, he pursued a career in the visual arts, earning a BA from Humboldt State University in Arcata, California, and an MFA from the University of Washington in 2002.

Hamon is a professor of art at The University of Montana. He has taught at the University of Washington in Seattle, Prescott College in Prescott, Arizona, Montana Tech of the University of Montana, and The Evergreen State College in Olympia, Washington.

== Personal ==
He is the cousin of James Heuga, former US alpine ski racer. Huega won the 1963 NCAA slalom championship and won the bronze medal in slalom for the 1964 Olympic games. Hamon lives in Montana with his wife and two children.
