= Sebastian Siedler =

German cyclist (born 1978)

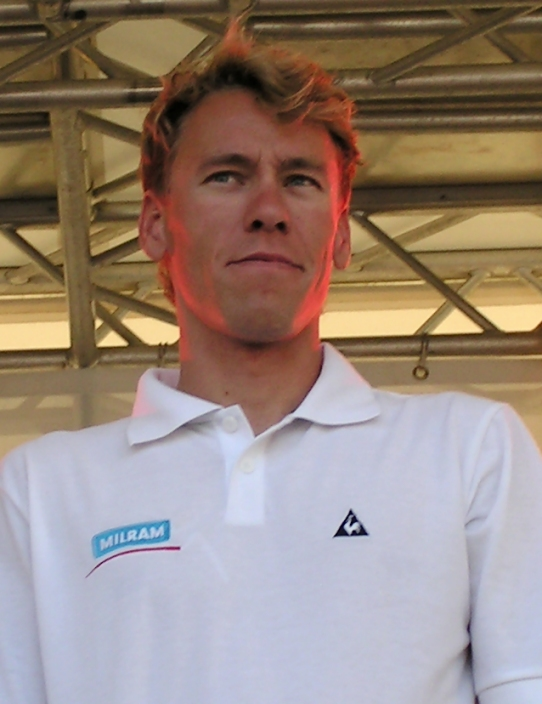

Personal information
- Full name: Sebastian Siedler
- Born: 18 January 1978 (age 48) Leipzig, Germany

Cycling career
- Sport: Cycling
- Current team: Retired
- Disciplines: Road, track
- Role: Rider

Professional teams
- 2004–2005: Team Wiesenhof
- 2006–2007: Team Milram
- 2008: Skil–Shimano
- 2009–2010: Vorarlberg–Corratec

Major wins
- Rund um die Nürnberger Altstadt (2004)

Sebastian Siedler (born 18 January 1978 in Leipzig) is a former racing cyclist from Germany, who last rode for UCI Continental team Vorarlberg–Corratec. He had a successful track career prior to turning to road bicycle racing, winning Team Pursuit at the 2000 UCI Track Cycling World Championships in Manchester. He turned professional in 2004 with Team Wiesenhof, and spent two seasons there before moving to Team Milram for two seasons. Siedler joined Vorarlberg–Corratec at the start of the 2009 season. He rode in the 2006 Vuelta a España, finishing 127th overall.

== Major results ==
2001
1st Stage 3 Brandenburg–Rundfahrt
3rd Stausee-Rundfahrt Klingnau
6th Rund um die Hainleite-Erfurt
2002
1st Stage 2 Hessen Rundfahrt
1st Stage 3 Cinturón a Mallorca
2003
1st Stages 4, 6 & 7 Tour de Serbie
1st Stages 2 & 6 Tour du Loir-et-Cher
2004
1st Rund um die Nürnberger Altstadt
1st Stage 5 Hessen Rundfahrt
1st Stage 3 Peace Race
4th Stausee-Rundfahrt Klingnau
4th Trofeo Cala Millor-Cala Bona
7th Overall Istrian Spring Trophy
2005
5th Schaal Sels
2007
6th Overall Bayern Rundfahrt

1st Stage 5

7th Overall Sachsen-Tour
2008
1st Stage 1 Tour de Picardie
10th Overall Tour of Qatar
2009
1st Stage 8 Tour of Turkey
1st Stage 6 Post Danmark Rundt
3rd Neuseen Classics
8th Châteauroux Classic
