= Olympic record progression track cycling – Women's 500 m time trial =

This is an overview of the progression of the Olympic track cycling record of the women's 500 m time trial as recognised by the Union Cycliste Internationale (UCI).

The women's 500 m time trial was introduced at the 2000 Summer Olympics and was discontinued after the 2004 Summer Olympics.

== Progression ==
Time	Cyclists	Location	Track	Date	Meet
34"140	Felicia Ballanger (FRA)	Sydney (AUS)	Indoor track	16 September 2000	2000 Summer Olympics
33"952	Anna Meares (AUS)	Athens (GRE)	Indoor track	20 August 2004	2004 Summer Olympics
