= Bradley McGee =

Australian cyclist (born 1976)

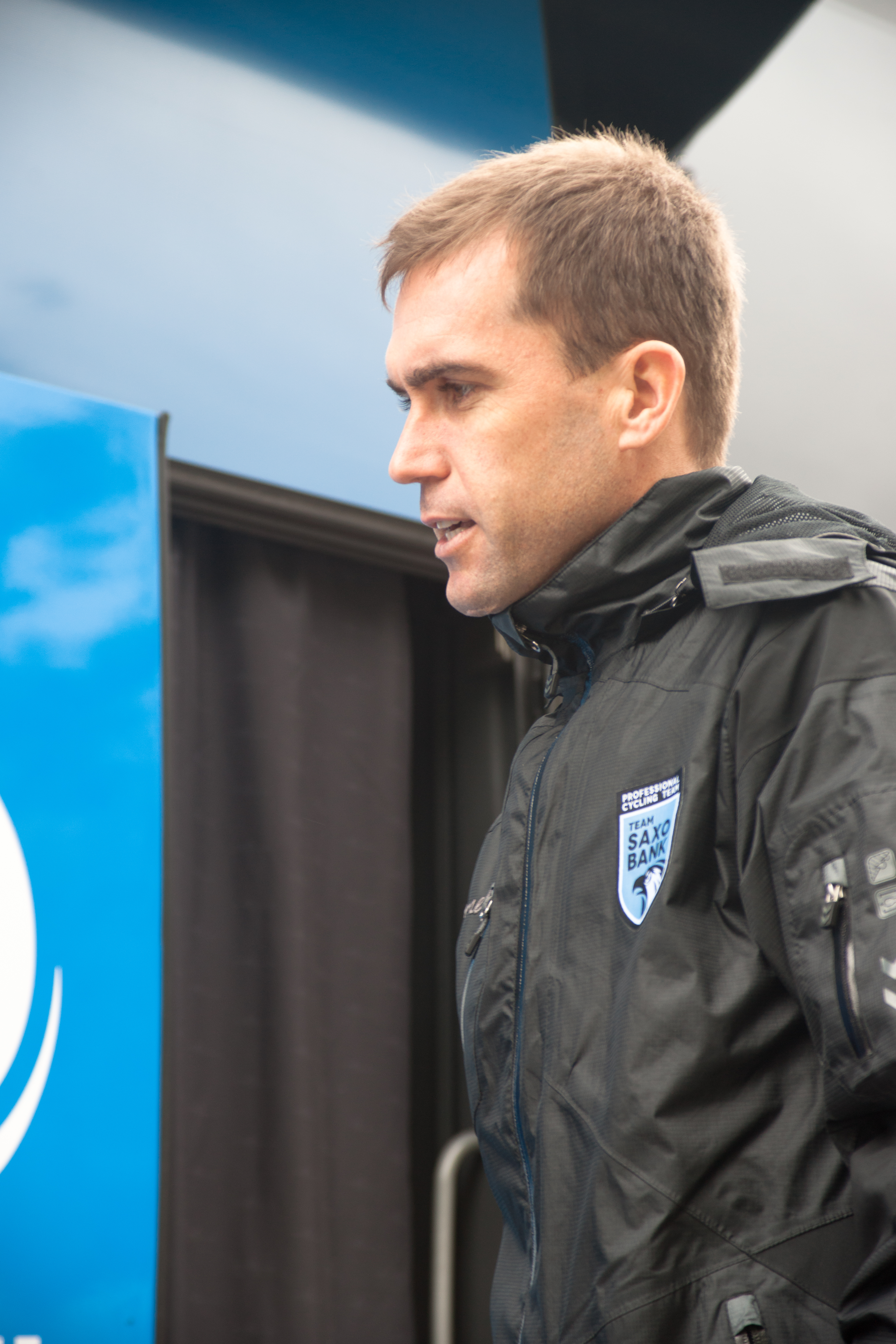

Personal information
- Full name: Bradley John McGee
- Born: 24 February 1976 (age 50) Sydney
- Height: 1.82 m (6 ft 0 in)
- Weight: 72 kg (159 lb)

Cycling career
- Sport: Cycling
- Current team: Retired
- Disciplines: Road and track
- Role: Directeur sportif
- Rider type: Time trialist

Professional teams
- 1999–2007: Française des Jeux
- 2008: Team CSC

Managerial team
- 2009–2012: Saxo Bank–SunGard

Major wins
- Grand Tours Tour de France 2 individual stages (2002, 2003) Giro d'Italia 1 individual stage (2004)
Medal record
Men's track cycling
Representing Australia
Olympic Games
| Gold medal – first place | 2004 Athens | Team pursuit |
| Silver medal – second place | 2004 Athens | Individual pursuit |
| Bronze medal – third place | 1996 Atlanta | Individual pursuit |
| Bronze medal – third place | 1996 Atlanta | Team pursuit |
| Bronze medal – third place | 2000 Sydney | Individual pursuit |
UCI Track World Championships
| Gold medal – first place | 1995 Bogota | Team pursuit |
| Gold medal – first place | 2002 Copenhagen | Individual pursuit |
Commonwealth Games
| Gold medal – first place | 1994 Victoria | Individual pursuit |
| Gold medal – first place | 1994 Victoria | Team pursuit |
| Gold medal – first place | 1998 Kuala Lumpur | Individual pursuit |
| Gold medal – first place | 1998 Kuala Lumpur | Team pursuit |
| Gold medal – first place | 2002 Manchester | Individual pursuit |

Bradley John McGee OAM (born 24 February 1976) is an Australian former professional racing cyclist. He is currently the head coach of the New South Wales Institute of Sport (NSWIS). He started cycling in 1986 at the age of ten. He lives in Sydney and in Nice, France.

== Career ==
His greatest success as a road cyclist has been winning the 2003 prologue of the Tour de France, and leading the race for three days in 2003. In 2004, he wore the leader's pink jersey of the Giro d'Italia for one day. In 2005, he wore the leader's golden jersey for four days in the Vuelta a España. He was the first Australian to lead the Tour of Spain, and the first to wear the leader's jersey of all three Grand Tours.

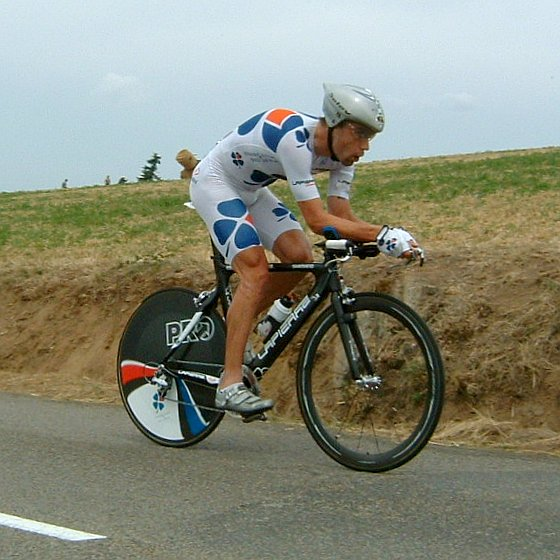
Brad McGee riding for Française des Jeux during the Stage 20 individual time trial of the 2005 Tour de France.

As a track cyclist and Australian Institute of Sport scholarship holder he met success in individual and team events. He won a gold medal at the 2004 Summer Olympics in Athens as a member of the team pursuit (with Graeme Brown, Brett Lancaster, and Luke Roberts) in world record time of 3:58.233. He won a silver medal for the Olympic 4000m pursuit. At the 2000 Summer Olympics in his home town of Sydney, he set an Australian record of 4 minutes 19.25 seconds, and won a bronze medal for the pursuit. In Atlanta at the 1996 Summer Olympics he won two bronze medals, for the individual pursuit and the team pursuit.

At the 1994 Commonwealth Games, he won gold medals in the individual and team pursuit. At the 1998 Commonwealth Games he defended his Commonwealth titles to win gold in both events. At the 2002 Commonwealth Games he won the individual pursuit.

He was awarded the Order of Australia Medal (OAM) in the 2005 Australia Day Honours List. Other awards include:

- 1993 Australian Male Cyclist of the year
- 1994 NSW junior male cyclist of the year
- 1995 NSW cyclist of the year
- 2002 Australian Male Track Cyclist of the Year
- 2017 Sport Australia Hall of Fame athlete inductee

Bradley McGee is today a member of the 'Champions for Peace' club, a group of 54 famous elite athletes committed to serving peace in the world through sport, created by Peace and Sport, a Monaco-based international organisation.

== Major results ==
=== Track ===
1993
1st Individual pursuit, UCI Junior Track World Championships
National Junior Track Championships

1st Individual pursuit
1st Teams pursuit

1994
Commonwealth Games

1st Individual pursuit
1st Team pursuit

UCI Junior Track World Championships

1st Individual pursuit
1st Team pursuit

National Junior Track Championships

1st Elimination race
1st Individual pursuit
1st Scratch race
1st Team pursuit

1995
1st Team pursuit, UCI Track World Championships
National Track Championships

1st Individual pursuit
1st Team pursuit

1996
Olympic Games

3rd Individual pursuit
3rd Team pursuit

1997
National Track Championships

1st Individual pursuit
1st Team pursuit

1st Individual pursuit – Quartu Sant'Elena, UCI Track World Cup Classics
1998
Commonwealth Games

1st Individual pursuit
1st Team pursuit

1999
Oceania International Grand Prix

1st Individual pursuit
1st Team pursuit

2000
3rd Individual pursuit, Olympic Games
2002
1st Individual pursuit, UCI Track World Championships
1st Individual pursuit, Commonwealth Games
2004
Olympic Games

1st Team pursuit
2nd Individual pursuit

1st Individual pursuit – Manchester, UCI Track World Cup Classics
2007
3rd Individual pursuit – Manchester, UCI Track World Cup Classics
2008
1st Team pursuit – Los Angeles, UCI Track World Cup Classics
3rd Team pursuit, UCI Track World Championships

=== Road ===
1993
1st Time trial, National Junior Road Championships
1996
1st Stage 2 Tour of Cologne
1998
9th Chrono des Nations
1999
Tour de l'Avenir

1st Stages 3 (ITT) & 10

1st Prologue Tour de Normandie
8th Overall Tour de Wallonie
2000
1st Stage 5 Herald Sun Tour
2001
1st Stage 4 Grand Prix du Midi Libre
1st Stage 2b (ITT) Route du Sud
4th Overall Circuit de la Sarthe
7th Paris–Camembert
10th Grand Prix Eddy Merckx (with Jacky Durand)
2002
1st Stage 7 Tour de France
Critérium du Dauphiné Libéré

1st Points classification
1st Prologue

2nd Overall Circuit de la Sarthe
2nd Overall GP Erik Breukink
10th Overall Critérium International
10th Tour de Vendée
2003
Tour de France

1st Prologue
Held after Stages 1–3

1st Stage 8 (ITT) Tour de Suisse
2nd Overall Ronde van Nederland

1st Stage 6

3rd Overall Tour de Picardie
5th Grand Prix Eddy Merckx (with Baden Cooke)
6th Grand Prix du Morbihan
8th Overall Circuit de la Sarthe
8th Grand Prix de Rennes
2004
1st Overall Route du Sud

1st Stage 3 (ITT)

8th Overall Giro d'Italia

1st Prologue
Held after Stages 1 & 3–4

8th Grand Prix des Nations
9th Overall Tour de Romandie

1st Prologue

2005
1st Grand Prix de Villers-Cotterêts
8th Overall Tour de Suisse

1st Points classification
1st Stage 3

Vuelta a España

Held after Stages 1–4

2006
8th Overall La Méditerranéenne

=== Grand Tour general classification results timeline ===
| Grand Tour | 2000 | 2001 | 2002 | 2003 | 2004 | 2005 | 2006 | 2007 | 2008 |
|---|---|---|---|---|---|---|---|---|---|
| Giro d'Italia | 127 | — | — | — | 8 | — | — | — | DNF |
| Tour de France | — | 83 | 109 | 133 | — | 105 | — | — | — |
| Vuelta a España | — | — | — | — | — | DNF | — | DNF | — |

Legend
| — | Did not compete |
| DNF | Did not finish |
