= Serhiy Matvyeyev =

Ukrainian cyclist (born 1975)

Personal information
- Full name: Serhiy Leonidovych Matvyeyev
- Born: 29 January 1975 (age 51) Myronivka, Ukrainian SSR, Soviet Union
- Height: 1.83 m (6 ft 0 in)
- Weight: 76 kg (168 lb)

Cycling career
- Sport: Cycling
- Current team: Retired
- Disciplines: Road; Track
- Role: Rider
- Rider type: Time-trialist

Amateur team
- 2000: Zoccorinese–Vellutex

Professional teams
- 2001–2007: Ceramiche Panaria–Fiordo
- 2008: Cinelli–OPD
- 2009: ISD

Major wins
- (Ukraine) National Time-Trial Championship (2003)
Medal record
Men's track cycling
Olympic Games
Silver medal – second place	2000 Sydney	Team Pursuit
UCI Track World Championships
Silver medal – second place	1995 Bogota	Team pursuit

Serhiy Leonidovych Matvyeyev (Ukrainian: Сергій Леонідович Матвєєв, born 29 January 1975) is a Ukrainian former professional road bicycle racer.

== Major results ==
1995
2nd Team pursuit, UCI Track World Championships
1997
2nd Team pursuit, UCI Track World Championships
1998
1st Team pursuit, UCI Track World Championships (with Alexander Symonenko, Oleksandr Fedenko & Ruslan Pidgornyy)
1999
1st Time trial, National Road Championships
2000
1st Grand Prix Europa (with Dario Andriotto)
2nd (silver) Team pursuit, Summer Olympics (with Sergiy Chernyavsky, Alexander Symonenko, Oleksandr Fedenko)
2nd Giro d'Oro
8th Time trial, UCI Road World Championships
2001
1st Stage 1 Circuit des Mines
4th Coppa Bernocchi
7th Giro d'Oro
8th Giro della Provincia di Siracusa
2002
5th Overall Circuit des Mines

1st Stage 3a (ITT)

6th GP Eddy Merckx
2003
National Road Championships

1st Time trial
2nd Road race

3rd Coppa Bernocchi
5th GP Nobili Rubinetterie
2004
1st Firenze–Pistoia
2nd Time trial, National Road Championships
2005
1st Firenze–Pistoia
2nd Time trial, National Road Championships
9th Overall Regio-Tour
10th Overall Circuit de Lorraine
2006
1st Stage 9 (ITT) Tour de Langkawi
5th Overall Circuit de la Sarthe
2007
1st GP de la Ville de Rennes
2nd Time trial, National Road Championships
4th Overall Three Days of De Panne
2008
2nd Time trial, National Road Championships
8th Overall Ronde de l'Oise
