= Olympic record progression track cycling – Women's individual pursuit =

This is an overview of the progression of the Olympic track cycling record of the women's 3000 m individual pursuit, as recognised by the Union Cycliste Internationale (UCI).

The women's 3000m individual pursuit was introduced at the 1992 Summer Olympics and was discontinued after the 2008 Summer Olympics.

== Progression ==
Time	Cyclists	Location	Track	Date	Meet
3'41"886	Kathy Watt (AUS)	Barcelona (ESP)	Open air track	30 July 1992	1992 Summer Olympics; Qualifying round
3'41"509	Petra Rossner (GER)	Barcelona (ESP)	Open air track	30 July 1992	1992 Summer Olympics; Quarter-finals
3'34"130	Antonella Bellutti (ITA)	Atlanta (USA)	Open air track	25 July 1996	1996 Summer Olympics; Qualifying round
3'32"371	Antonella Bellutti (ITA)	Atlanta (USA)	Open air track	25 July 1996	1996 Summer Olympics; Quarter-finals
3'31"570	Leontien Zijlaard (NED)	Sydney (AUS)	Indoor track	17 September 2000	2000 Summer Olympics; Qualifying round
3'30"816	Leontien Zijlaard (NED)	Sydney (AUS)	Indoor track	17 September 2000	2000 Summer Olympics; Semi-Finals
3'26"400	Sarah Ulmer (NZL)	Athens (GRE)	Indoor track	21 August 2004	2004 Summer Olympics; Qualifying round
3'24"537	Sarah Ulmer (NZL)	Athens (GRE)	Indoor track	22 August 2004	2004 Summer Olympics; Gold medal race
