= Mariano Friedick =

American cyclist (born 1975)

Personal information
- Full name: Mariano Friedick
- Born: January 9, 1975 (age 51) Tarzana, California

Cycling career
- Sport: Cycling
- Current team: Retired
- Disciplines: Road; Track
- Role: Rider

Professional teams
- 1997–1998: Saturn
- 1999–2005: Ikon–Lexus
- 2006: Toyota–United
- 2007: Rock Racing
Medal record
Representing United States
Men's track cycling
World Championships
Silver medal – second place	1994 Palermo	Team pursuit
Bronze medal – third place	1995 Bogotá	Team pursuit

Mariano Friedick (born January 9, 1975, in Tarzana, California) is an American former professional cyclist.

== Major results ==
1993
2nd Road race, UCI Junior Road World Championships
1994
2nd Team pursuit, UCI Track Cycling World Championships
1995
2nd Road race, Pan American Games
3rd Team pursuit, UCI Track Cycling World Championships
2001
1st Stage 4 Tour of the Gila
2002
2nd Tucson Bicycle Classic
2003
1st Stage 2 Yuma North End Classic
2004
1st Overall Valley of the Sun Stage Race

1st Stage 2

1st Stage 1 Tour of Temecula
1st Stage 4 San Dimas Stage Race
2nd Tour de Temecula
