= Dunc Gray Velodrome =

Building in Sydney, Australia

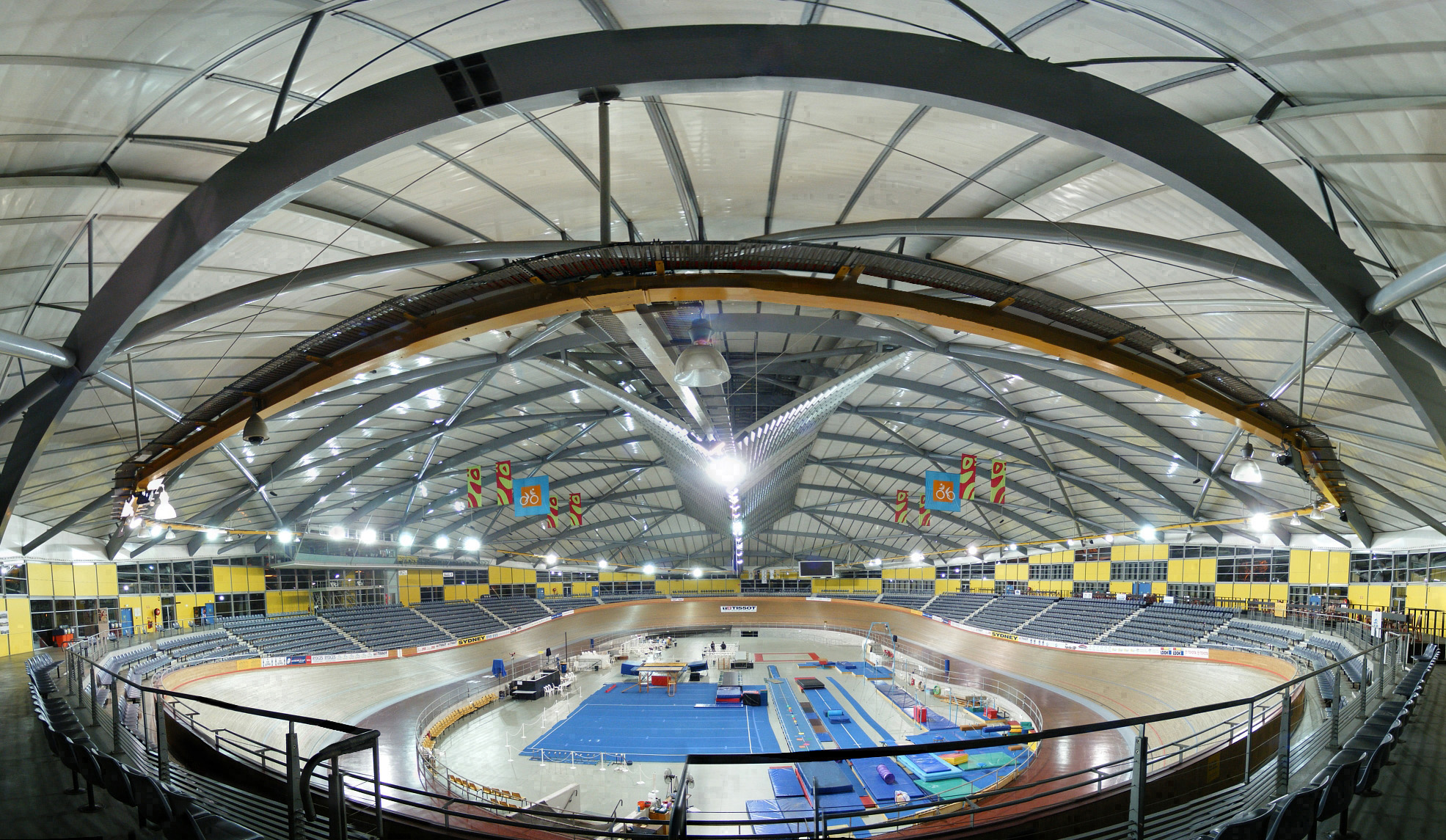
- Interactive map of Dunc Gray Velodrome
- Location: Carysfield Road, Bass Hill, Sydney
- Coordinates: 33°54′27″S 150°59′55″E
- Capacity: 3,150; 5,821 (2000 Summer Olympics)
- Surface: Baltic Pine

Construction
- Groundbreaking: May 1998
- Opened: 26 January 2000
- Cost: A$42m
- Architect: Ron Webb (track)

Dunc Gray Velodrome is a velodrome located at Bass Hill approximately five kilometres north west of the Sydney suburb of Bankstown. The cycling venue for the 2000 Summer Olympics, the Dunc Gray Velodrome was opened on 28 November 1999 with an opening ceremony which included performances by local talent Darren Sharp and other community groups. The Velodrome is named after Dunc Gray, the first Australian to win a cycling gold medal at the Olympic Games in Los Angeles in 1932.

At the time of its construction, the State Government owned the velodrome. Bankstown Council managed the velodrome under a sublease. In 1998, the council sublet the velodrome to Bankstown Sports Club, under a 21-year sublease. The council resumed control of the velodrome in 2019.

== Construction ==
The Dunc Gray Velodrome was built as a track cycling venue for the Sydney 2000 Olympics, construction of the velodrome, as well as an 800m Criterium Practice Track, commenced in May 1998 and finished in November 1999, at a cost of $42 million. It currently has a seating capacity of 3,150, but was expanded to 5,821 seats to cater for the 2000 Olympics.

At 250 metres length, 60 kilometres worth of Baltic Pine (Finland) were used in its composition. The track bends at a maximum angle of 42° degrees, while the straights are at 12.5°. The Safety Track is 5 metres wide and the racing surface is of 7 metres width.

== Events ==
The first major international cycling event ever held was the Oceania International Cycling Grand Prix from 8 to 12 December 1999 – an official pre-Olympic test event.

In April 2000, it hosted the 'Bankstown Millennium Buzz' performance in celebrating the Olympics and the millennium year. It hosted six days of track cycling events at the 2000 Summer Olympics, as well as Paralympic cycling.

In October 2007, The Dunc Gray Velodrome hosted the 2007 UCI Track Cycling Masters World Championships, for riders 30+ years of age.

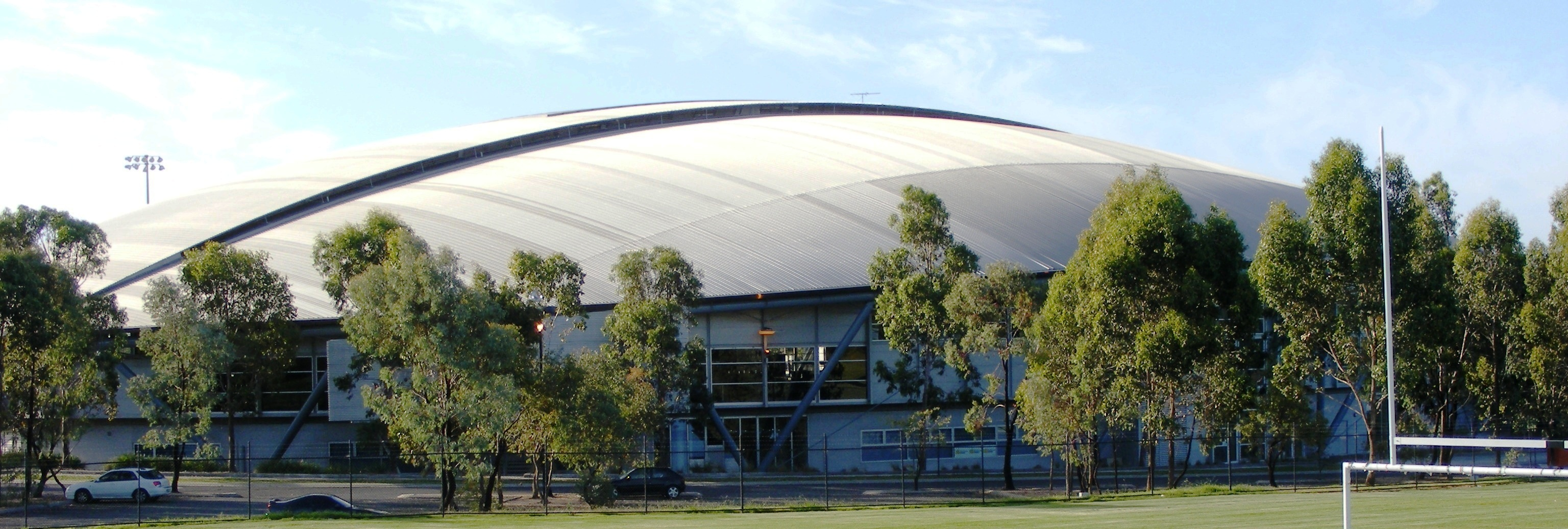
The Dunc Gray Velodrome

== See also ==
- 2000 Summer Olympics venues
- Cycling in Sydney
- List of cycling tracks and velodromes
