= Daniel Becke =

German cyclist

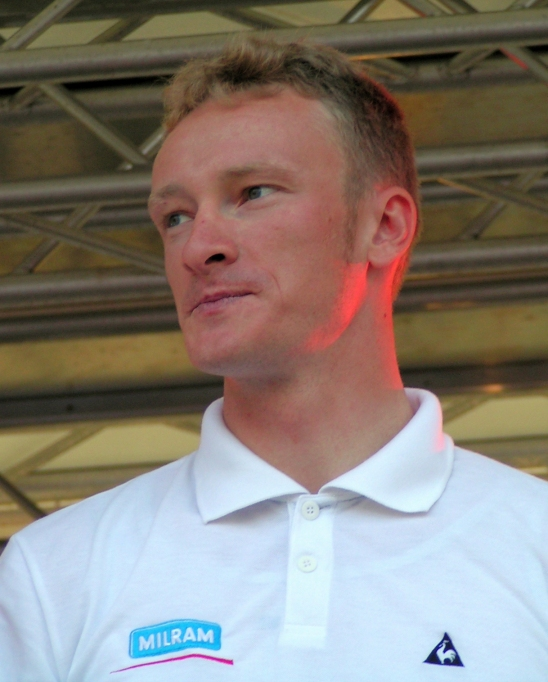
- Daniel Becke at the 2006 Deutschland Tour in Düsseldorf

Personal information
- Full name: Daniel Becke
- Nickname: Doc
- Born: 12 March 1978 (age 48) Erfurt, East Germany
- Height: 1.87 m (6 ft 2 in)

Cycling career
- Sport: Cycling
- Disciplines: Track, road
- Role: Rider
Medal record
Representing Germany
Men's track cycling
Olympic Games
Gold medal – first place	2000 Sydney	Team Pursuit

Daniel Becke (born 12 March 1978) is a former road bicycle and track cyclist from Germany, who was born in the former East Germany. He won a gold medal in the team pursuit at the 2000 Summer Olympics in Sydney. He was decorated on Febr. 2. 2001 by the President of the Federal Republic of Germany (in German: Präsident der Bundesrepublik Deutschland) for winning the gold medal during the Olympic Games 2000. He retired in 2008.
