= Brett Lancaster =

Australian cyclist (born 1979)

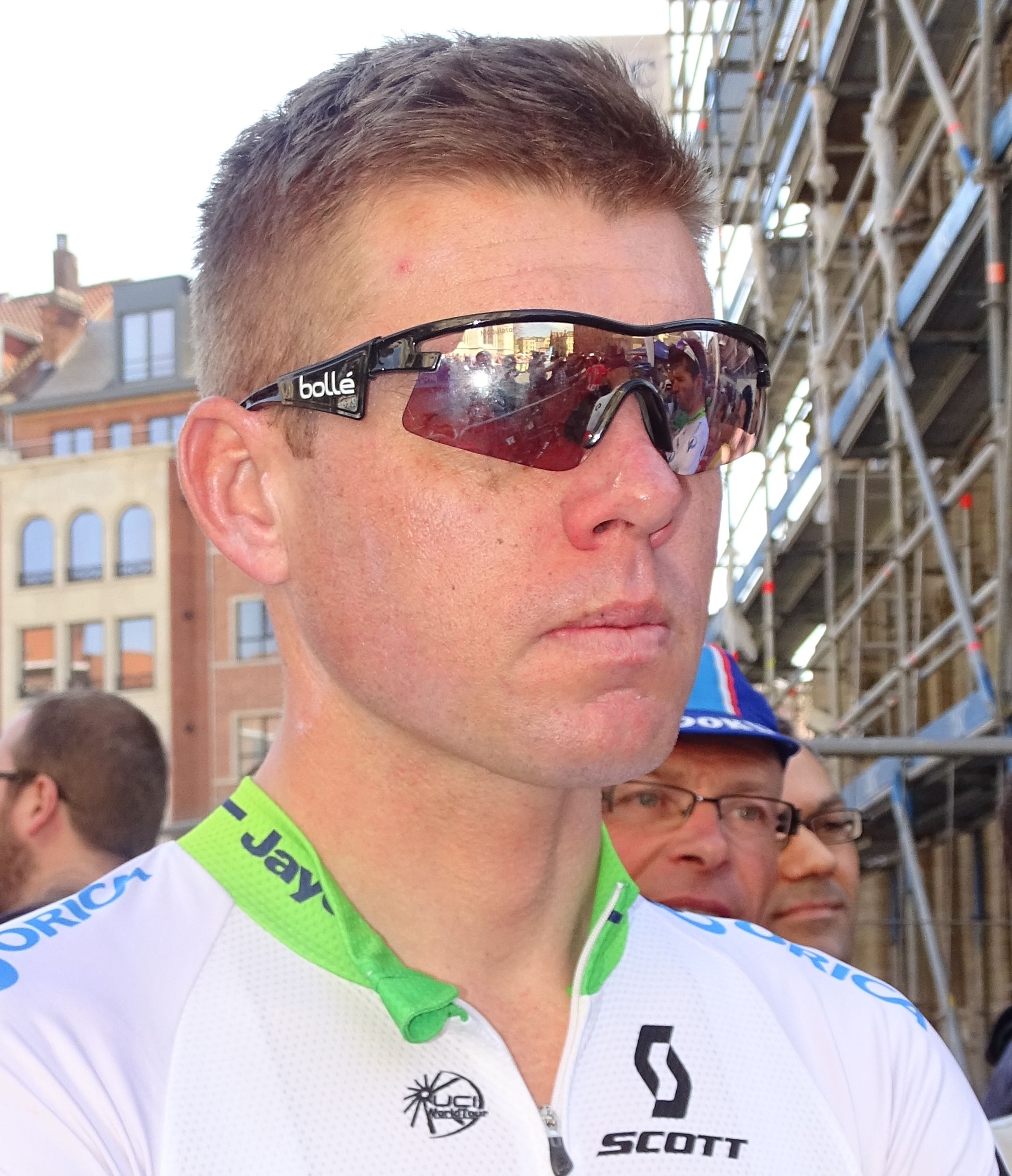
- Lancaster in 2015

Personal information
- Full name: Brett Daniel Lancaster
- Nickname: Burt
- Born: 15 November 1979 (age 47) Shepparton, Victoria, Australia
- Height: 1.89 m (6 ft 2 in)
- Weight: 80 kg (176 lb)

Cycling career
- Sport: Cycling
- Current team: Netcompany–Ineos
- Disciplines: Road; Track
- Role: Rider (retired); Directeur sportif
- Rider type: Prologue specialist

Professional teams
- 2003–2005: Ceramiche Panaria–Fiordo
- 2006–2008: Team Milram
- 2009–2010: Cervélo TestTeam
- 2011: Garmin–Cervélo
- 2012–2015: GreenEDGE

Managerial team
- 2016–: Team Sky

Major wins
- Grand Tours Tour de France 1 TTT stage (2013) Giro d'Italia 1 individual stage (2005) 2 TTT stages (2014, 2015)
Medal record
Men's track cycling
Representing Australia
Olympic Games
Gold medal – first place	2004 Athens	Team pursuit
World Championships
Gold medal – first place	2002 Ballerup	Team pursuit
Gold medal – first place	2003 Stuttgart	Team pursuit
Commonwealth Games
Gold medal – first place	1998 Kuala Lumpur	Team pursuit
Men's road bicycle racing
Representing Orica–GreenEDGE
World Championships
Silver medal – second place	2013 Tuscany	Team time trial
Silver medal – second place	2014 Ponferrada	Team time trial

Brett Lancaster OAM (born 15 November 1979) is an Australian former professional racing cyclist, who rode professionally between 2003 and 2016. Born in Shepparton, Victoria, Lancaster started cycle racing at the age of 14 in 1993. He spent four years riding for Ceramiche Panaria–Fiordo before moving to Team Milram in July 2006. In 2009 and 2010 he rode for Cervélo TestTeam, and rode for Garmin–Cervélo in 2011.

His greatest successes as a road cyclist were winning the prologue of the Giro d'Italia, and thus wearing the race general classification leader's pink jersey. He set a time of 1' 20" for the 1.15-kilometre (0.71-mile) race against the clock, the shortest prologue in the 88-year history of the event. Brett Lancaster is the first member of the Italian registered team, Ceramica Panaria–Navigare, to ever claim the pink jersey.

He won a gold medal at the 2004 Summer Olympics in Athens as a member of the team pursuit (with Graeme Brown, Bradley McGee, and Luke Roberts) in world record-breaking time of 3:58.233.

He was awarded the Order of Australia Medal (OAM) in the 2005 Australia Day Honours List. He was an Australian Institute of Sport scholarship holder.

Lancaster retired from cycling after the 2015 season, and moved to become a directeur sportif for Team Sky in 2016.

== Major results ==
=== Road ===
1996
1st Junior race, National Criterium Championships
1997
National Junior Road Championships

1st Time trial
2nd Criterium

2001
1st Stage 9 Herald Sun Tour
2002
1st Ronde van Overijssel
4th Mi-Août 4
2003
6th Overall International Tour of Rhodes
2004
1st Stage 3 Tour de Langkawi
2005
1st Prologue Giro d'Italia
2nd Paris–Camembert
3rd Gran Premio Città di Misano – Adriatico
8th Overall Circuit de Lorraine
2006
4th Grand Prix de Rennes
2007
3rd Eindhoven Team Time Trial
6th Down Under Classic
2008
1st Prologue Deutschland Tour
9th Firenze–Pistoia
2009
2nd Overall Tour du Poitou-Charentes
2010
1st Stage 2 Tour of California
2013
1st Stage 4 (TTT) Tour de France
Tour of Slovenia

1st Points classification
1st Stage 4

2nd Team time trial, UCI Road World Championships
2014
1st Stage 1 (TTT) Giro d'Italia
2nd Team time trial, UCI Road World Championships
8th Vuelta a La Rioja
2015
1st Stage 1 (TTT) Giro d'Italia

=== Track ===
1997
1st Team pursuit, UCI Junior Track Cycling World Championships
National Junior Track Championships

1st Individual pursuit
1st Track time trial
2nd Team pursuit
2nd Team sprint

1998
1st Team pursuit, Commonwealth Games
UCI Track World Cup Classics, Victoria

1st Team pursuit
3rd Individual pursuit

1999
Team pursuit, UCI Track World Cup Classics

1st Frisco
1st Cali

2nd Individual pursuit, National Track Championships
2000
National Track Championships

2nd Individual pursuit
2nd Team pursuit

2001
2nd Team pursuit, National Track Championships
2002
1st Team pursuit, UCI Track World Championships
2003
1st Team pursuit, UCI Track World Championships
2nd Madison, National Track Championships
2004
1st Team pursuit, Olympic Games
