= Jens Lehmann (cyclist) =

German cyclist and politician (born 1967)

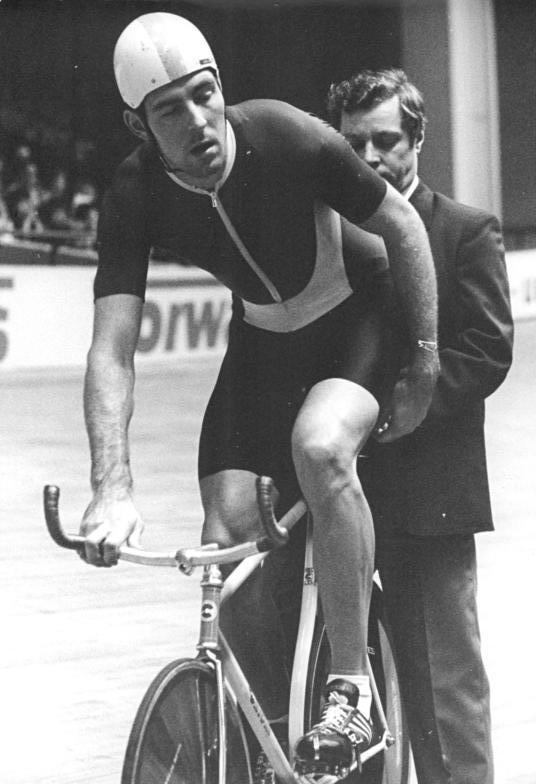
- Lehmann in 1990

Personal information
- Full name: Jens Lehmann
- Born: 19 December 1967 (age 58) Stolberg, Saxony-Anhalt, East Germany

Cycling career
- Sport: Cycling
- Discipline: Track
- Role: Rider
Medal record
Men's track cycling
Representing East Germany
UCI World Championships
Silver medal – second place	1989 Lyon	Amateur individual pursuit
Representing Germany
Olympic Games
Gold medal – first place	1992 Barcelona	Team pursuit
Gold medal – first place	2000 Sydney	Team pursuit
Silver medal – second place	1992 Barcelona	Individual pursuit
Silver medal – second place	2000 Sydney	Individual pursuit
UCI World Championships
Gold medal – first place	1991 Stuttgart	Amateur individual pursuit
Gold medal – first place	1991 Stuttgart	Team pursuit
Gold medal – first place	1994 Palermo	Team pursuit
Gold medal – first place	2000 Manchester	Individual pursuit
Gold medal – first place	2000 Manchester	Team pursuit
Silver medal – second place	1993 Hamar	Team pursuit
Silver medal – second place	1999 Berlin	Individual pursuit
Silver medal – second place	2001 Antwerp	Individual pursuit
Silver medal – second place	2002 Ballerup	Team pursuit
Bronze medal – third place	1994 Palermo	Individual pursuit
Bronze medal – third place	2001 Antwerp	Team pursuit
Bronze medal – third place	2002 Ballerup	Individual pursuit

Jens Lehmann (born 19 December 1967) is a German politician of the CDU and a former professional cyclist and double Olympic champion.

== Cycling career ==
Despite his many successes (including being part of the first team pursuit squad to break the 4-minute barrier for the 4,000-metre team pursuit), he will probably be remembered best as the person caught by Chris Boardman riding the revolutionary Lotus Superbike, in the final of the 1992 Olympic individual pursuit in Barcelona. Lehmann was World Champion at that time.

== Political career ==
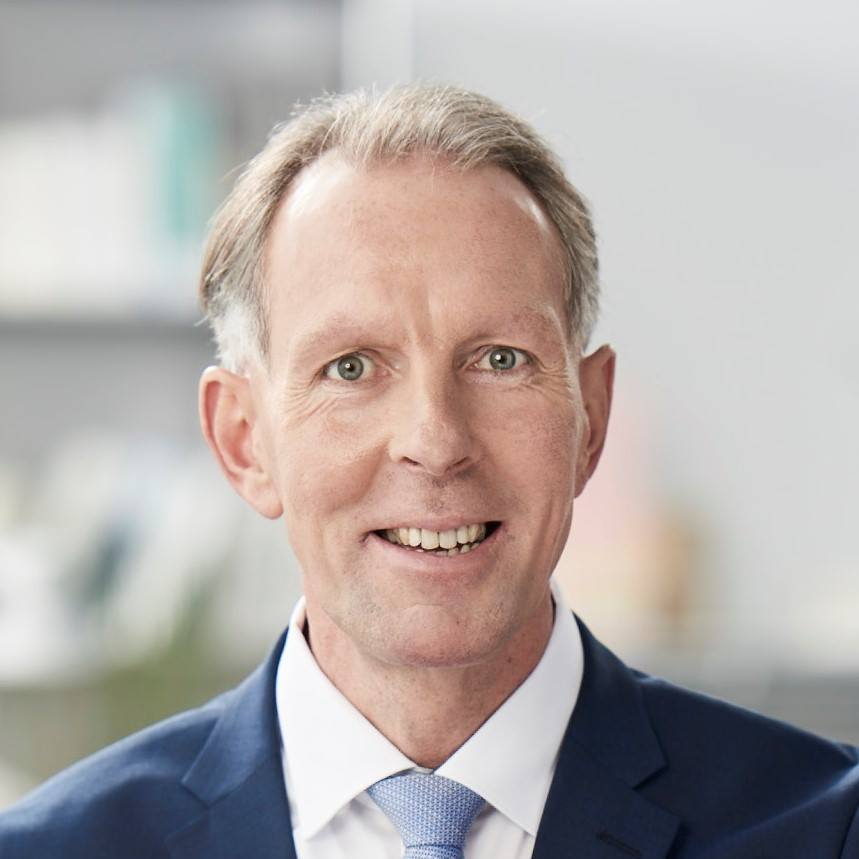
Jens Lehmann as a Member of the German Bundestag in 2018

In the 2017 German federal election, Lehmann was elected as member of the Bundestag, representing the Leipzig I district. In parliament, he has been serving on the Defence Committee (since 2018) and the Sports Committee (since 2022).

== Other activities ==
- Agentur für Innovationen in der Cybersicherheit, Member of the Supervisory Board (since 2022)
- German War Graves Commission, Member
