= Oleksandr Symonenko =

Ukrainian cyclist (born 1974)

Personal information
- Full name: Oleksandr Serhiyovych Symonenko
- Born: 14 February 1974 (age 52) Kirovohrad, Ukrainian SSR, Soviet Union

Cycling career
- Sport: Cycling
- Current team: Retired
- Discipline: Track
- Role: Rider
Medal record
Representing Ukraine
Men's track cycling
Olympic Games
Silver medal – second place	2000 Sydney	Team pursuit
World Championships
Gold medal – first place	1998 Bordeaux	Team pursuit
Gold medal – first place	2001 Antwerp	Individual pursuit
Gold medal – first place	2001 Antwerp	Team pursuit
Silver medal – second place	1995 Bogotá	Team pursuit
Silver medal – second place	1997 Perth	Team pursuit

Oleksandr Serhiyovych Symonenko (Ukrainian: Олександр Сергійович Симоненко; born 14 February 1974) is a Ukrainian former track cyclist. Symonenko was the world champion in individual pursuit in 2001, as well as the world champion in team pursuit as part of the Ukraine team in 1998 and 2001. In the 2000 Summer Olympics, he won a silver medal in the team pursuit as part of the Ukraine team. Symonenko was born in Kirovohrad (present day Kropyvnytskyi).

== Results ==
Date	Placing	Event	Competition	Location	Country
September 30, 1995	2nd place, silver medalist(s)	Team pursuit	World Championships	Bogotá	Colombia
June 1997	3	Individual pursuit	World Cup	Quartu Sant'Elena	Italy
June 1997	1	Team pursuit	World Cup	Quartu Sant'Elena	Italy
August 30, 1997	2nd place, silver medalist(s)	Team pursuit	World Championships	Perth	Australia
June 12, 1998	2	Team pursuit	World Cup	Berlin	Germany
June 19, 1998	2	Team pursuit	World Cup	Hyères	France
August 26, 1998	1st place, gold medalist(s)	Team pursuit	World Championships	Bordeaux	France
June 19, 1999	2	Team pursuit	World Cup	Valencia	Spain
August 28, 1999	1	Team pursuit	World Cup	Fiorenzuola d'Arda	Italy
July 15, 2000	2	Team pursuit	World Cup	Turin	Italy
September 19, 2000	2nd place, silver medalist(s)	Team pursuit	Olympic Games	Sydney	Australia
June 8, 2001	2	Individual pursuit	World Cup	Szczecin	Poland
June 9, 2001	3	Team pursuit	World Cup	Szczecin	Poland
September 27, 2001	1st place, gold medalist(s)	Individual pursuit	World Championships	Antwerp	Belgium
September 28, 2001	1st place, gold medalist(s)	Team pursuit	World Championships	Antwerp	Belgium
June 1, 2002	2	Team pursuit	World Cup	Moscow	Russia
April 12, 2003	1	Team pursuit	World Cup	Cape Town	South Africa
