= Luke Roberts (cyclist) =

Australian cyclist (born 1977)

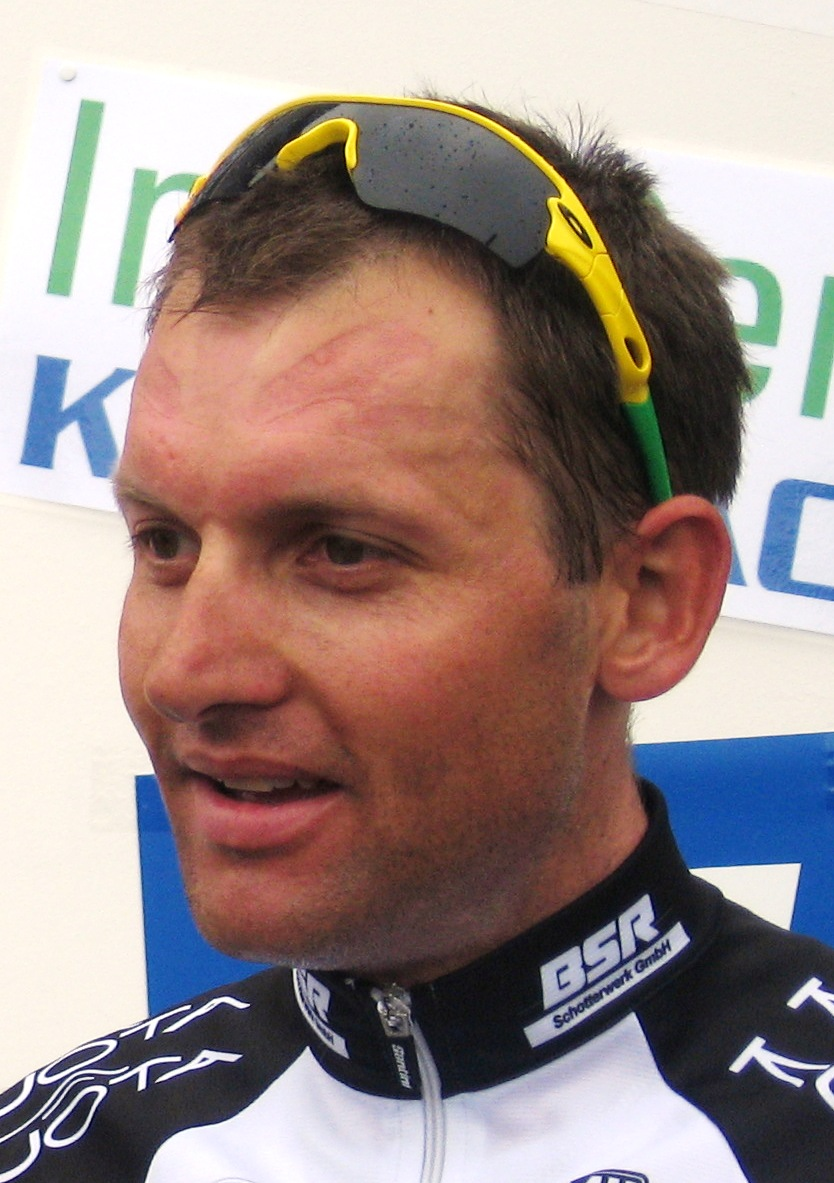
- Roberts in 2009

Personal information
- Full name: Luke Justin Roberts
- Born: 25 January 1977 (age 49) Adelaide, Australia
- Height: 1.80 m (5 ft 11 in)
- Weight: 71 kg (157 lb)

Cycling career
- Sport: Cycling
- Current team: Stölting-Ruhr
- Disciplines: Road and track
- Role: Rider
- Rider type: Pursuit specialist/Time Trialist

Professional teams
- 2002–2004: Team ComNet
- 2005–2007: Team CSC
- 2008–2009: Team Kuota
- 2010: Team Milram
- 2011–2012: Saxo Bank–SunGard
- 2013–2014: Stölting-Ruhr

Major wins
- Olympic Team Pursuit (2004)
Medal record
Representing Australia
Men's track cycling
Olympic Games
Gold medal – first place	2004 Athens	4000 m team pursuit
Commonwealth Games
Gold medal – first place	1998 Kuala Lumpur	4000 m team pursuit
Gold medal – first place	2002 Manchester	4000 m team pursuit
Silver medal – second place	1998 Kuala Lumpur	4000 m individual pursuit

Luke Justin Roberts (born 25 January 1977) is a sports director and former Australian racing cyclist specialising in both track cycling and road bicycle racing.

Born in Adelaide, South Australia, he resides both in Adelaide and in Cologne, Germany. Coming from a cycle racing family, he started competitive cycling at the age of 13, and turned professional in 2002. He was an Australian Institute of Sport scholarship holder. and a member of the Comnet Senges team (2002–2004), and of Team CSC from 2005 to 2007. As a team and individual pursuit specialist, holding an Olympic gold medal and World record with the Australian Pursuit team at the 2004 Summer Olympics, he contributes particularly to the success of his team in time trial events.

In 2003 he was awarded the title of Australian Male Track Cyclist of the Year. In 2005 he was awarded the Order of Australia medal in the Australia Day Honours List. In 2002, 2003 and 2004 he was a World Champion Team pursuit, and won the silver medal in 2002 and 2003 for the World Individual Pursuit Championship.

At the Olympic level, Luke Roberts has competed as part of the Australian cycling team at the 2000 Summer Olympics in Sydney and the 2004 Summer Olympics in Athens. In 2000 he came 9th in the Individual Pursuit at the Olympic Games. He improved his performance 4 years later in Athens, coming 5th in the Individual Pursuit. As part of the Australian pursuit team with Graeme Brown, Brett Lancaster, Bradley McGee, (Peter Dawson and Stephen Wooldridge were also part of the team), Roberts won gold and set a new world record for the 4000m Team Pursuit of 3mins 56.610secs, breaking their previous world record set in Stuttgart in 2003.

At the 1998 Commonwealth Games, Roberts achieved a gold medal for the Teams Pursuit, a silver medal in the Individual Pursuit, and came 8th in the Points race. Four year later at the 2002 Commonwealth Games in Manchester, Roberts won gold in the Teams Pursuit and 4th in the Individual Pursuit. His 2010 road racing team, Team Milram, folded at the end of that season, and he signed to ride for a proposed Australian team known as Pegasus: this team, however, failed to obtain a UCI license. After riding with UniSA in the 2011 Tour Down Under, Roberts signed with Saxo Bank–SunGard, a continuation of the squad he was with from 2005 to 2007, for the remainder of the season.

== Major results ==
1993
Under-17 National Track Championships

1st Individual pursuit
1st Sprint

Under-17 National Road Championships

1st Individual time trial
1st Team time trial

1994
Junior World Track Championships

1st Team pursuit
3rd Individual pursuit

1995
Junior World Track Championships

1st Individual pursuit
1st Team pursuit

Junior National Track Championships

1st Individual pursuit
1st Team pursuit
1st Elimination race
1st Points race

1st Junior National Time Trial Championships
1996
1st National Teams Pursuit Champion
1998
1st Teams Pursuit 1998 Commonwealth Games
1st National Teams Pursuit Champion
Track World Cup

1st Individual pursuit
1st Madison
1st Team pursuit

2nd Individual Pursuit 1998 Commonwealth Games
1999
National Track Championships

1st Individual pursuit
1st Team pursuit

1st Teams Pursuit Track World Cup
1st Individual Pursuit overall Track World Cup rankings
2nd Individual Pursuit Track World Cup
2000
1st National Individual Pursuit Champion
2001
1st Stage 4 Tour Down Under
2002
1st Teams Pursuit World Champion
1st Teams Pursuit 2002 Commonwealth Games
1st Overall Tour of Tasmania
2003
1st Team Pursuit World Champion
1st Individual Pursuit, UCI Track Cycling World Cup Classics
Giro del Veneto

1st Prologue & Stage 4

1st Giro del Capo
1st Stage 5 Ringerike Grand Prix
2nd Individual Pursuit World Titles
2nd Overall Brandenburg-Rundfahrt
2nd Overall Herald Sun Tour
2004
1st 2004 Summer Olympic Games Team Pursuit
1st Team Pursuit World Champion
1st Stage 6 Tour de Normandie
1st Stage 1 Intl Rheinland-Pfalz Rundfahrt
9th Overall Tour Down Under
2005
1st Stage 4 TTT Tour Méditerranéen
3rd Eindhoven Team Time Trial
6th TEAG Hainleite
8th T-Mobile International
10th LUK Challenge Chrono Bühl
2006
1st Stage 4, 3-Länder-Tour
3rd Overall Bayern-Rundfahrt
2007
1st Eindhoven TTT
3rd Overall Tour of Britain
6th Overall Tour Down Under
9th Paris–Bourges
2008
1st Stage 3 Giro del Capo
1st Stolberg-Breinig
2009
1st Grenoble, Six Days
2010
1st Stage 3 Tour of Murcia
5th Overall Tour Down Under
2011
10th Overall Tour Down Under

1st Mountains classification

2012
7th Overall Driedaagse van West-Vlaanderen
2013
1st Prologue Istrian Spring Trophy
5th Poreč Trophy
