= Paul Manning (cyclist) =

English cyclist (born 1974)

Paul Manning MBE
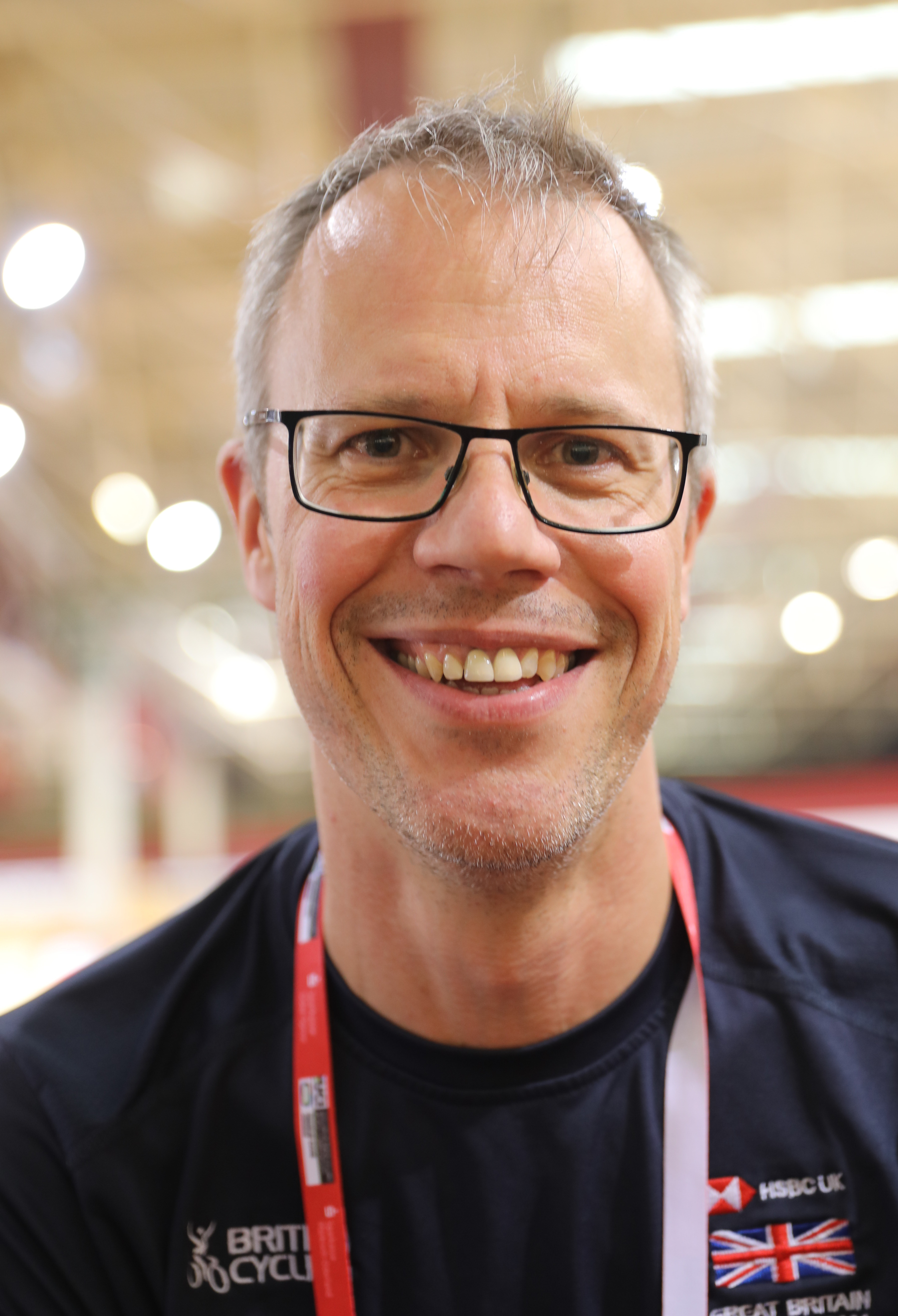
- Paul Manning (2019)

Personal information
- Full name: Paul Christian Manning
- Born: 6 November 1974 (age 51) Sutton Coldfield, England
- Height: 1.89 m (6 ft 2 in)
- Weight: 76 kg (168 lb; 12.0 st)

Cycling career
- Sport: Cycling
- Current team: Landbouwkrediet-Tönissteiner
- Disciplines: Road & Track
- Role: Rider

Professional team
- 2007–2008: Landbouwkrediet-Tönissteiner
Medal record
Men's track cycling
Representing Great Britain
Olympic Games
Gold medal – first place	2008 Beijing	Team Pursuit
Silver medal – second place	2004 Athens	Team Pursuit
Bronze medal – third place	2000 Sydney	Team Pursuit
World Championships
Gold medal – first place	2005 Los Angeles	Team Pursuit
Gold medal – first place	2007 Palma de Mallorca	Team Pursuit
Gold medal – first place	2008 Manchester	Team Pursuit
Silver medal – second place	2000 Manchester	Team Pursuit
Silver medal – second place	2001 Antwerp	Team Pursuit
Silver medal – second place	2003 Stuttgart	Team Pursuit
Silver medal – second place	2004 Melbourne	Team Pursuit
Silver medal – second place	2006 Bordeaux	Team Pursuit
Bronze medal – third place	2006 Bordeaux	Individual Pursuit
Representing England
Commonwealth Games
Gold medal – first place	2006 Melbourne	Team Pursuit
Gold medal – first place	2006 Melbourne	Individual Pursuit
Silver medal – second place	2002 Manchester	Team Pursuit
Bronze medal – third place	2002 Manchester	Individual Pursuit

Paul Christian Manning, MBE (born 6 November 1974, Sutton Coldfield) is a former English professional track and road bicycle racer who rode for the UCI Professional Continental team Landbouwkrediet-Tönissteiner in 2007 and 2008. He is strong in the Individual and Team Pursuit disciplines on track and has won many medals for Britain in the Olympics, Commonwealth Games, Track World Championships and Track World Cups.

He was the British national individual pursuit champion in 2001, 2003, 2004 and 2005. He was also the national points race champion in 2005.

On 17 August 2008, Manning was a member of the Olympic team pursuit squad which broke the world record in the heats with a time of 3:55:202, beating their Russian opponents comfortably to go through to the final ride-off for silver and gold. The following day, on their way to winning the gold medal, the British Team pursuit broke their own world record in a time of 3:53:314, beating their Danish competitors by 6.7 seconds.

After the Olympics he announced his retirement from professional cycling. Manning was appointed Member of the Order of the British Empire (MBE) in the 2009 New Year Honours.

In 2009, he was inducted into the British Cycling Hall of Fame.

After his retirement Manning joined the GB Cycling Team coaching staff as women's endurance coach; since then the women's endurance team has broken the Team Pursuit world record six times, once in winning the gold medal at the 2012 London Olympics. Manning won the ‘High Performance Coach of the Year Award’ at the 2012 UK Coaching Awards.

He studied Earth Sciences at the University of Birmingham and graduated in 1996.

Manning coaches the New Zealand female pursuit team, going to the 2024 Olympics with the team.

== Palmares ==
=== Olympics ===
2000 Sydney
3rd, Team Pursuit (bronze medal)
2004 Athens
2nd, Team Pursuit (silver medal)
2008 Beijing
1st, Team Pursuit (gold medal)

=== World Championships ===
2000 Manchester
2nd, Team Pursuit
2001 Belgium
2nd, Team Pursuit
2003 Stuttgart
2nd, Team Pursuit
4th, Individual Pursuit
2004 Melbourne
2nd, Team Pursuit
2005 Los Angeles
1st, Team Pursuit
2006 Bordeaux
2nd, Team Pursuit
3rd, Individual Pursuit
2007 Palma de Mallorca
1st, Team Pursuit
2008 Manchester
1st, Team Pursuit

=== Commonwealth Games ===
2002 Manchester
2nd, Team Pursuit
3rd, Individual Pursuit
2006 Melbourne
1st, Individual Pursuit
1st, Team Pursuit
9th, Men's Road Time Trial

=== UCI Track World Cup ===
2002 Mexico
1st, Individual Pursuit
2003 South Africa
2nd, Team Pursuit
2003 Mexico
2nd, Team Pursuit
3rd, Individual Pursuit
2004 Sydney
1st, Individual Pursuit
1st, Team Pursuit
2004 Manchester
3rd, Individual Pursuit
1st, Team Pursuit
2005/6 Manchester
1st, Team Pursuit
1st, Individual Pursuit
2006 Moscow
1st, Team Pursuit
3rd, Individual Pursuit

=== British Championships ===
2001
1st, Individual Pursuit
2003
1st, Individual Pursuit
2004
1st, Individual Pursuit
1st, Team Pursuit
2005
1st, Points Race
1st, Individual Pursuit

=== Other results ===
1996
Duo Normand (with Chris Boardman)
2001
FBD Milk Ras
2002
FBD Milk Ras stage 6
2003
Herald Sun Tour stage 8
2007
Tour of Britain stage 6
