= Serhii Cherniavskyi =

Ukrainian cyclist (born 1976)

Personal information
- Born: 2 April 1976 (age 50) Vinnytsia, Ukrainian SSR, Soviet Union
- Height: 1.75 m (5 ft 9 in)
- Weight: 67 kg (148 lb)

Sport
- Sport: Cycling
Medal record
Representing Ukraine
Olympic Games
Silver medal – second place	2000 Sydney	Team pursuit
World Championships
Gold medal – first place	2001 Antwerp	Team pursuit
World Cups
Silver medal – second place	1998 Hyères	Team pursuit
Silver medal – second place	1999 Valencia	Team pursuit

Serhii Volodymyrovych Cherniavskyi, or Serhiy Volodymyrovych Chernyavsʼkyy (Ukrainian: Сергій Володимирович Чернявський; born 2 April 1976) is a retired Ukrainian cyclist. He won a silver medal at the 2000 Summer Olympics and a world title in 2001 in the 4000 m team pursuit.

After retiring from competitions, he taught cycling while working on his PhD at the Vinnytsia State Pedagogical University.
