= 1986 UCI Track Cycling World Championships =

- Venue: Colorado Springs, United States
- Date: 27 August–7 September 1986
- Velodrome: 7-Eleven USOTC Velodrome
- Events: 14

The 1986 UCI Track Cycling World Championships were the World Championship for track cycling. They took place in Colorado Springs, United States in 1986. Fourteen events were contested, 12 for men (5 for professionals, 7 for amateurs) and 2 for women.

In the same period, the 1986 UCI Road World Championships were also organized in Colorado Springs.

== Medal summary ==
Event	Gold	Silver	Bronze
Men's professional events
Men's keirin	Michel Vaarten; Belgium	Dieter Giebken; West Germany	Urs Freuler; Switzerland
Men's sprint	Kōichi Nakano; Japan	Hideyuki Matsui (松井英幸); Japan	Nobuyuki Tawara; Japan
Men's individual pursuit	Tony Doyle; Great Britain	Hans-Henrik Ørsted; Denmark	Jesper Worre; Denmark
Men's points race	Urs Freuler; Switzerland	Michel Vaarten; Belgium	Stefano Allocchio; Italy
Men's motor-paced	Bruno Vicino; Italy	Constant Tourné; Belgium	Giovanni Renosto; Italy
Men's amateur events
Men's 1 km time trial	Maic Malchow; East Germany	Martin Vinnicombe; Australia	Jens Glücklich; East Germany
Men's sprint	Michael Hübner; East Germany	Lutz Heßlich; East Germany	Ralf-Guido Kuschy; East Germany
Men's individual pursuit	Viatcheslav Ekimov; Soviet Union	Gintautas Umaras; Soviet Union	Dean Woods; Australia
Men's team pursuit	Czechoslovakia; Pavel Soukup; Aleš Trčka; Svatopluk Buchta; Teodor Černý	East Germany; Steffen Blochwitz; Dirk Meier; Bernd Dittert; Roland Hennig	Soviet Union; Viatcheslav Ekimov; Alexander Krasnov; Viktor Manakov; Gintautas Umaras
Men's points race	Dan Frost; Denmark	Olaf Ludwig; East Germany	Leonard Nitz; United States
Men's motor-paced	Mario Gentili; Italy	Luigi Bielli; Italy	Roland Königshofer; Austria
Men's tandem	Czechoslovakia; Vítězslav Vobořil; Roman Řehounek	United States; Kit Kyle; David Lindsey	Italy; Andrea Faccini; Roberto Nicotti
Women's events
Women's sprint	Christa Rothenburger; East Germany	Erika Salumäe; Soviet Union	Connie Paraskevin; United States
Women's individual pursuit	Jeannie Longo; France	Rebecca Twigg; United States	Barbara Ganz; Switzerland

== Medal table ==
Rank	Nation	Gold	Silver	Bronze	Total
1	East Germany (GDR)	3	3	2	8
2	Italy (ITA)	2	1	3	6
3	Czechoslovakia (TCH)	2	0	0	2
4	Soviet Union (URS)	1	2	1	4
5	Belgium (BEL)	1	2	0	3
6	Denmark (DEN)	1	1	1	3
6	Japan (JPN)	1	1	1	3
8	Switzerland (SUI)	1	0	2	3
9	France (FRA)	1	0	0	1
9	Great Britain (GBR)	1	0	0	1
11	United States (USA)	0	2	2	4
12	Australia (AUS)	0	1	1	2
13	West Germany (FRG)	0	1	0	1
14	Austria (AUT)	0	0	1	1
Totals (14 entries)		14	14	14	42
