= 1987 UCI Track Cycling World Championships =

- Venue: Vienna, Austria
- Date: August 1987
- Velodrome: Ferry-Dusika-Hallenstadion
- Events: 14

The 1987 UCI Track Cycling World Championships were the World Championship for track cycling. They took place in Vienna, Austria in August 1987. Fourteen events were contested, 12 for men (5 for professionals, 7 for amateurs) and 2 for women.

In the same period, the 1987 UCI Road World Championships were organized in Villach.

== Medal summary ==
Event	Gold	Silver	Bronze
Men's professional events
Men's keirin	Harumi Honda; Japan	Claudio Golinelli; Italy	Urs Freuler; Switzerland
Men's sprint	Nobuyuki Tawara; Japan	Hideyuki Matsui (松井英幸); Japan	Claudio Golinelli; Italy
Men's individual pursuit	Hans-Henrik Ørsted; Denmark	Jesper Worre; Denmark	Tony Doyle; Great Britain
Men's points race	Urs Freuler; Switzerland	Tony Doyle; Great Britain	Roger Ilegems; Belgium
Men's motor-paced	Max Hürzeler; Switzerland	Danny Clark; Australia	Werner Betz; West Germany
Men's amateur events
Men's 1 km time trial	Martin Vinnicombe; Australia	Jens Glücklich; East Germany	Konstantin Khrabtsov; Soviet Union
Men's sprint	Lutz Heßlich; East Germany	Michael Hübner; East Germany	Bill Huck; East Germany
Men's individual pursuit	Gintautas Umaras; Soviet Union	Viatcheslav Ekimov; Soviet Union	Artūras Kasputis; Soviet Union
Men's team pursuit	Soviet Union; Viatcheslav Ekimov; Alexander Krasnov; Viktor Manakov; Sergeï Chmelinine	East Germany; Steffen Blochwitz; Dirk Meier; Carsten Wolf; Roland Hennig	Czechoslovakia; Pavel Soukup; Miroslav Kundera; Svatopluk Buchta; Miroslav Junec
Men's points race	Marat Ganeev; Soviet Union	Uwe Messerschmidt; West Germany	Pascal Lino; France
Men's motor-paced	Mario Gentili; Italy	Vincenzo Colamartino; Italy	Roland Königshofer; Austria
Men's tandem	France; Fabrice Colas; Frédéric Magné	Italy; Andrea Faccini; Roberto Nicotti	Czechoslovakia; Vítězslav Vobořil; Lubomír Hargaš
Women's events
Women's sprint	Erika Salumäe; Soviet Union	Christa Rothenburger; East Germany	Connie Paraskevin-Young; United States
Women's individual pursuit	Rebecca Twigg; United States	Jeannie Longo; France	Mindee Mayfield; United States

== Medal table ==
Rank	Nation	Gold	Silver	Bronze	Total
1	Soviet Union (URS)	4	1	2	7
2	Japan (JPN)	2	1	0	3
3	Switzerland (SUI)	2	0	1	3
4	East Germany (GDR)	1	4	1	6
5	Italy (ITA)	1	3	1	5
6	France (FRA)	1	1	1	3
7	Australia (AUS)	1	1	0	2
7	Denmark (DEN)	1	1	0	2
9	United States (USA)	1	0	2	3
10	Great Britain (GBR)	0	1	1	2
10	West Germany (FRG)	0	1	1	2
12	Czechoslovakia (TCH)	0	0	2	2
13	Austria (AUT)	0	0	1	1
13	Belgium (BEL)	0	0	1	1
Totals (14 entries)		14	14	14	42

== See also ==
- 1987 UCI Road World Championships
