= UCI Track Cycling World Championships – Men's keirin =

International Keirin competition

The UCI Track Cycling World Championships – Men's keirin is the world championship Keirin event held annually at the UCI Track Cycling World Championships. It was first held at the 1980 championships in Besançon, France. As of 2026, Harrie Lavreysen from Netherlands have the most titles with five.

Chris Hoy is the only man to win the World and Olympic titles in the same year in 2008 and 2012.

== Medalists ==
Championships	Winner	Runner-up	Third
1980 Besançon	Danny Clark (AUS)	Daniel Morelon (FRA)	Niels Fredborg (DEN)
1981 Brno	Danny Clark (AUS)	Guido Bontempi (ITA)	Chiyoshi Kubo (久保千代志) (JPN)
1982 Leicester	Gordon Singleton (CAN)	Danny Clark (AUS)	Toru Kitamura (北村徹) (JPN)
1983 Zürich	Urs Freuler (SUI)	Danny Clark (AUS)	Gibby Hatton (USA)
1984 Barcelona	Robert Dill-Bundi (SUI)	Ottavio Dazzan (ITA)	Urs Freuler (SUI)
1985 Bassano del Grappa	Urs Freuler (SUI)	Ottavio Dazzan (ITA)	Masamitsu Takizawa (滝澤正光) (JPN); Dieter Giebken (FRG)
1986 Colorado Springs	Michel Vaarten (BEL)	Dieter Giebken (FRG)	Urs Freuler (SUI)
1987 Vienna	Harumi Honda (JPN)	Claudio Golinelli (ITA)	Shigenori Inoue (井上茂徳) (JPN)
1988 Ghent	Claudio Golinelli (ITA)	Ottavio Dazzan (ITA)	Michel Vaarten (BEL)
1989 Lyon	Claudio Golinelli (ITA)	Patrick Da Rocha (FRA)	Sako Masatoshi (佐古雅俊) (JPN)
1990 Maebashi	Michael Hübner (GDR)	Michel Vaarten (BEL)	Claudio Golinelli (ITA)
1991 Stuttgart	Michael Hübner (GER)	Claudio Golinelli (ITA)	Fabrice Colas (FRA)
1992 Valencia	Michael Hübner (GER)	Stephen Pate (AUS)	Frédéric Magné (FRA)
1993 Hamar	Gary Neiwand (AUS)	Marty Nothstein (USA)	Toshimasa Yoshioka (吉岡稔真) (JPN)
1994 Palermo	Marty Nothstein (USA)	Michael Hübner (GER)	Federico Paris (ITA)
1995 Bogotá	Frédéric Magné (FRA)	Michael Hübner (GER)	Federico Paris (ITA)
1996 Manchester	Marty Nothstein (USA)	Gary Neiwand (AUS)	Frédéric Magné (FRA)
1997 Perth	Frédéric Magné (FRA)	Jean-Pierre Van Zyl (RSA)	Marty Nothstein (USA)
1998 Bordeaux	Jens Fiedler (GER)	Ainārs Ķiksis (LAT)	Laurent Gané (FRA)
1999 Berlin	Jens Fiedler (GER)	Anthony Peden (NZL)	Frédéric Magné (FRA)
2000 Manchester	Frédéric Magné (FRA)	Jens Fiedler (GER)	Pavel Buráň (CZE)
2001 Antwerp	Ryan Bayley (AUS)	Laurent Gané (FRA)	Jens Fiedler (GER)
2002 Ballerup	Jobie Dajka (AUS)	José Antonio Villanueva (ESP)	René Wolff (GER)
2003 Stuttgart	Laurent Gané (FRA)	Jobie Dajka (AUS)	Barry Forde (BAR)
2004 Melbourne	Jamie Staff (GBR)	José Antonio Escuredo (ESP)	Ivan Vrba (CZE)
2005 Los Angeles	Teun Mulder (NED)	Barry Forde (BAR)	Shane John Kelly (AUS)
2006 Bordeaux	Theo Bos (NED)	José Antonio Escuredo (ESP)	Arnaud Tournant (FRA)
2007 Palma de Mallorca	Chris Hoy (GBR)	Theo Bos (NED)	Ross Edgar (GBR)
2008 Manchester	Chris Hoy (GBR)	Teun Mulder (NED)	Christos Volikakis (GRE)
2009 Pruszków	Maximilian Levy (GER)	François Pervis (FRA)	Teun Mulder (NED)
2010 Ballerup	Chris Hoy (GBR)	Azizulhasni Awang (MAS)	Maximilian Levy (GER)
2011 Apeldoorn	Shane Perkins (AUS)	Chris Hoy (GBR)	Teun Mulder (NED)
2012 Melbourne	Chris Hoy (GBR)	Maximilian Levy (GER)	Jason Kenny (GBR)
2013 Minsk	Jason Kenny (GBR)	Maximilian Levy (GER)	Matthijs Büchli (NED)
2014 Cali	François Pervis (FRA)	Fabián Puerta (COL)	Matthijs Büchli (NED)
2015 Yvelines	François Pervis (FRA)	Eddie Dawkins (NZL)	Azizulhasni Awang (MAS)
2016 London	Joachim Eilers (GER)	Eddie Dawkins (NZL)	Azizulhasni Awang (MAS)
2017 Hong Kong	Azizulhasni Awang (MAS)	Fabián Puerta (COL)	Tomáš Bábek (CZE)
2018 Apeldoorn	Fabián Puerta (COL)	Tomoyuki Kawabata (JPN)	Maximilian Levy (GER)
2019 Pruszków	Matthijs Büchli (NED)	Yudai Nitta (JPN)	Stefan Bötticher (GER)
2020 Berlin	Harrie Lavreysen (NED)	Yuta Wakimoto (JPN)	Azizulhasni Awang (MAS)
2021 Roubaix	Harrie Lavreysen (NED)	Jeffrey Hoogland (NED)	Mikhail Iakovlev (RCF)
2022 Saint-Quentin-en-Yvelines	Harrie Lavreysen (NED)	Jeffrey Hoogland (NED)	Kevin Quintero (COL)
2023 Glasgow	Kevin Quintero (COL)	Matthew Richardson (AUS)	Shinji Nakano (JPN)
2024 Ballerup	Kento Yamasaki (JPN)	Mikhail Iakovlev (ISR)	Kevin Quintero (COL)
2025 Santiago	Harrie Lavreysen (NED)	Leigh Hoffman (AUS)	Jeffrey Hoogland (NED)
2026 Shanghai	Harrie Lavreysen (NED)	Maximilian Dörnbach (GER)	Shinji Nakano (JPN)

== Medal table ==
Rank	Nation	Gold	Silver	Bronze	Total
1	Netherlands	8	4	5	17
2	Australia	6	7	1	14
3	Germany	6	6	5	17
4	France	6	4	6	16
5	Great Britain	6	1	2	9
6	Switzerland	3	0	2	5
7	Italy	2	6	3	11
8	Japan	2	3	8	13
9	Colombia	2	2	2	6
10	United States	2	1	2	5
11	Malaysia	1	1	3	5
12	Belgium	1	1	1	3
13	Canada	1	0	0	1
13	East Germany	1	0	0	1
15	New Zealand	0	3	0	3
15	Spain	0	3	0	3
17	Barbados	0	1	1	2
17	West Germany	0	1	1	2
19	Israel	0	1	0	1
19	Latvia	0	1	0	1
19	South Africa	0	1	0	1
22	Czech Republic	0	0	3	3
23	Denmark	0	0	1	1
23	Greece	0	0	1	1
23	Russian Cycling Federation	0	0	1	1
Totals (25 entries)		47	47	48	142

== See also ==
- Koichi Nakano
- 1980 UCI Track Cycling World Championships
- UCI Track Cycling World Championships – Women's keirin
