= World record progression track cycling – Men's flying 200 m time trial =

This is an overview of the progression of the World track cycling record of the men's flying 200 m time trial as recognised by the Union Cycliste Internationale.

== Progression ==
=== Professionals (1955–1990) ===
Time	Cyclist	Location	Track	Date
11"0	Arie Van Vliet (NED)	Copenhagen (DEN), Ordrup	Open air track	9 September 1955
11"0	Antonio Maspes (ITA)	Rome (ITA), Olympic Velodrome	Open air track	13 July 1960
10"8	Antonio Maspes (ITA)	Rome (ITA), Olympic Velodrome	Open air track	21 July 1960
10"778	D. Rueda Efrain (COL)	Mexico City (MEX), Olympic Velodrome	Open air track	8 November 1985
10"723	Lech Barczewski (USA)	Colorado Springs (USA)	Open air track	16 August 1986
10"567	D. Rueda Efrain (COL)	La Paz (BOL), Alto Irpavi	Open air track	12 December 1986
10"405	J. F. Kennedy (USA)	Colorado Springs (USA)	Open air track	24 August 199?
11"1	Oscar Plattner (SUI)	Zürich (SUI), Hallenstadion	Indoor track	17 August 1956
10"99	Oscar Plattner (SUI)	Zürich (SUI), Hallenstadion	Indoor track	1 December 1961
10"587	Claudio Golinelli (ITA)	Vienna (AUT), Ferry-Dusika-Hallenstadion	Indoor track	25 August 1987
10"459	Stephen Pate (AUS)	Launceston (AUS), Silverdome	Indoor track	19 March 1989
10"345	Michael Huebner (RDA)	Maebashi (JPN), Yamada Green Dome Maebashi	Indoor track	20 August 1990

=== Amateurs (1954–1990) ===
Time	Cyclist	Location	Track	Date
12"0	Cesare Pinarello (ITA)	Milan (ITA), Vigorelli	Open air track	26 October 1954
12"0	Virginio Pizzali (ITA)	Milan (ITA), Vigorelli	Open air track	2 November 1954
11"7	Juri Voltchek (URS)	Irkutsk (URS), St. Dynamo	Open air track	27 June 1955
11"4	Rostislav Vargashkin (URS)	Tula (URS), St. Chakhter	Open air track	25 July 1955
11"2	Dick Ploog (AUS)	Melbourne (AUS), Olympic Velodrome	Open air track	6 December 1956
11"0	Sante Gaiardoni (ITA)	Rome (ITA), Olympic Velodrome	Open air track	30 July 1960
10"69	Omar Pkhakadze (URS)	Mexico City (MEX), Centre Sp.	Open air track	21 October 1967
10"61	Omar Pkhakadze (URS)	Mexico City (MEX), Centre Sp.	Open air track	22 October 1967
10"580	Gordon Singleton (CAN)	Mexico City (MEX), Olympic Velodrome	Open air track	9 October 1980
10"441	Lutz Heßlich (RDA)	Tbilissi (URS)	Open air track	10 May 1984
10"190	Lutz Heßlich (RDA)	Colorado Springs (USA)	Open air track	4 July 1985
10"118	Michael Huebner (RDA)	Colorado Springs (USA)	Open air track	27 August 1986
11"8	Guglielmo Pesenti (ITA)	Milan (ITA), Palais Des Sports	Indoor track	18 January 1956
11"5	Guglielmo Pesenti (ITA)	Milan (ITA), Palais Des Sports	Indoor track	17 February 1957
11"4	Giuseppe Beghetto (ITA)	Milan (ITA), Palais Des Sports	Indoor track	5 November 1960
11"4	Sergio Bianchetto (ITA)	Milan (ITA), Palais Des Sports	Indoor track	5 November 1960
11"4	V. Frennet (BEL)	Brussels (BEL), Palais Des Sports	Indoor track	14 October 1961
11"4	Giovanni Pettenella (ITA)	Milan (ITA), Palais Des Sports	Indoor track	29 December 1964
10"72	Daniel Morelon (FRA)	Zürich (SUI), Hallenstadion	Indoor track	4 November 1966
10"650	Sergei Zouravlev (URS)	Moscow (URS)	Indoor track	2 August 1981
10"369	Sergei Kopylov (URS)	Moscow (URS)	Indoor track	2 August 1981
10"249	Sergei Kopylov (URS)	Moscow (URS)	Indoor track	6 August 1981
10"224	Michael Huebner (RDA)	Moscow (URS)	Indoor track	8 July 1986
10"123	Nikolai Kovsh (URS)	Moscow (URS)	Indoor track	2 August 1987

=== Open (from 1990) ===
Time	Cyclist	Location	Track	Date	Ref
10.099	Vladimir Adamachvili (URS)	Moscow, Soviet Union	Indoor track	6 August 1990	
9.865	Curt Harnett (CAN)	Bogotá, Colombia	Open air track	28 September 1995	
9.772	Theo Bos (NED)	Moscow, Russia	Indoor track	16 December 2006	
9.650	Kevin Sireau (FRA)	Moscow, Russia	Indoor track	29 May 2009	
9.572	Kevin Sireau (FRA)	Moscow, Russia	Indoor track	30 May 2009	
9.347	Francois Pervis (FRA)	Aguascalientes, Mexico	Indoor track	6 December 2013	
9.100	Nicholas Paul (TTO)	Cochabamba, Bolivia	Indoor track	6 September 2019	
9.091	Matthew Richardson (AUS)	Paris, France	Indoor track	7 August 2024	
9.088	Harrie Lavreysen (NED)	Paris, France	Indoor track	7 August 2024	
8.941	Matthew Richardson (GBR)	Konya, Turkey	Indoor track	14 August 2025	
8.857	Matthew Richardson (GBR)	Konya, Turkey	Indoor track	15 August 2025	
