= UCI Track Cycling World Championships – Women's points race =

The UCI Track Cycling World Championships – Women's points race is the women's world championship points race event held annually at the UCI Track Cycling World Championships. A demonstration, non-Championship event was staged in 1988 with the first World Championship taking place in 1989. Ingrid Haringa of the Netherlands is the most successful cyclist in the history of this event, with four gold medals.

== Medalists ==
Championships	Gold	Silver	Bronze
1988 Ghent	Sally Hodge (GBR)	Barbara Ganz (SUI)	Monique de Bruin (NED)
1989 Lyon	Jeannie Longo-Ciprelli (FRA)	Barbara Ganz (SUI)	Janie Eickhoff (USA)
1990 Maebashi	Karen Holliday (NZL)	Svetlana Samokhvalova (RUS)	Kristel Werckx (BEL)
1991 Stuttgart	Ingrid Haringa (NED)	Kristel Werckx (BEL)	Janie Eickhoff (USA)
1992 Valencia	Ingrid Haringa (NED)	Barbara Ganz (SUI)	Janie Eickhoff (USA)
1993 Hamar	Ingrid Haringa (NED)	Svetlana Samokhvalova (RUS)	Jessica Grieco (USA)
1994 Palermo	Ingrid Haringa (NED)	Svetlana Samokhvalova (RUS)	Ludmilla Gorojanskaja (BLR)
1995 Bogotá	Svetlana Samokhvalova (RUS)	Nada Cristofoli (ITA)	Nathalie Lancien-Even (FRA)
1996 Manchester	Svetlana Samokhvalova (RUS)	Janie Eickhoff (USA)	Goulnara Fatkoulina (RUS)
1997 Perth	Natalia Karimova (RUS)	Teodora Ruano (ESP)	Belem Guerrero (MEX)
1998 Bordeaux	Teodora Ruano (ESP)	Belem Guerrero (MEX)	Olga Sliusareva (RUS)
1999 Antwerp	Marion Clignet (FRA)	Judith Arndt (GER)	Sarah Ulmer (NZL)
2000 Manchester	Marion Clignet (FRA)	Judith Arndt (GER)	Olga Sliusareva (RUS)
2001 Antwerp	Olga Sliusareva (RUS)	Katherine Bates (AUS)	Belem Guerrero (MEX)
2002 Copenhagen	Olga Sliusareva (RUS)	Lada Kozlíková (CZE)	Vera Carrara (ITA)
2003 Stuttgart	Oksana Grichina (RUS)	Edita Kubelskienė (LTU)	Yoanka González (CUB)
2004 Melbourne	Olga Sliusareva (RUS)	Vera Carrara (ITA)	Belem Guerrero (MEX)
2005 Los Angeles	Vera Carrara (ITA)	Olga Sliusareva (RUS)	Katherine Bates (AUS)
2006 Bordeaux	Vera Carrara (ITA)	Olga Sliusareva (RUS)	Gema Pascual Torrecilla (ESP)
2007 Palma de Mallorca	Katherine Bates (AUS)	Mie Bekker Lacota (DEN)	Catherine Cheatley (NZL)
2008 Manchester	Marianne Vos (NED)	Trine Schmidt (DEN)	Vera Carrara (ITA)
2009 Pruszków	Giorgia Bronzini (ITA)	Yumari González (CUB)	Elizabeth Armitstead (GBR)
2010 Ballerup	Tara Whitten (CAN)	Lauren Ellis (NZL)	Tatsiana Sharakova (BLR)
2011 Apeldoorn	Tatsiana Sharakova (BLR)	Jarmila Machačová (CZE)	Giorgia Bronzini (ITA)
2012 Melbourne	Anastasia Chulkova (RUS)	Jasmin Glaesser (CAN)	Caroline Ryan (IRL)
2013 Minsk	Jarmila Machačová (CZE)	Sofía Arreola (MEX)	Giorgia Bronzini (ITA)
2014 Cali	Amy Cure (AUS)	Stephanie Pohl (GER)	Jasmin Glaesser (CAN)
2015 Yvelines	Stephanie Pohl (GER)	Minami Uwano (JPN)	Kimberly Geist (USA)
2016 London	Katarzyna Pawłowska (POL)	Jasmin Glaesser (CAN)	Arlenis Sierra (CUB)
2017 Hong Kong	Elinor Barker (GBR)	Sarah Hammer (USA)	Kirsten Wild (NED)
2018 Apeldoorn	Kirsten Wild (NED)	Jennifer Valente (USA)	Jasmin Duehring (CAN)
2019 Pruszków	Alexandra Manly (AUS)	Lydia Boylan (IRL)	Kirsten Wild (NED)
2020 Berlin	Elinor Barker (GBR)	Jennifer Valente (USA)	Anita Stenberg (NOR)
2021 Roubaix	Lotte Kopecky (BEL)	Katie Archibald (GBR)	Kirsten Wild (NED)
2022 Saint-Quentin-en-Yvelines	Neah Evans (GBR)	Julie Leth (DEN)	Jennifer Valente (USA)
2023 Glasgow	Lotte Kopecky (BEL)	Georgia Baker (AUS)	Tsuyaka Uchino (JPN)
2024 Ballerup	Julie Norman Leth (DEN)	Lotte Kopecky (BEL)	Lara Gillespie (IRL)
2025 Santiago	Yareli Acevedo (MEX)	Anna Morris (GBR)	Bryony Botha (NZL)
2026 Shanghai	Lara Gillespie (IRL)	Amalie Dideriksen (DEN)	Shari Bossuyt (BEL)

== Medal table ==
Rank	Nation	Gold	Silver	Bronze	Total
1	Russia	8	5	3	16
2	Netherlands	6	0	4	10
3	Great Britain	4	2	1	7
4	Italy	3	2	4	9
5	Australia	3	2	1	6
6	France	3	0	1	4
7	Belgium	2	2	2	6
8	Denmark	1	4	0	5
9	Germany	1	3	0	4
10	Mexico	1	2	3	6
11	Canada	1	2	2	5
12	Czech Republic	1	2	0	3
13	New Zealand	1	1	3	5
14	Ireland	1	1	2	4
15	Spain	1	1	1	3
16	Belarus	1	0	2	3
17	Poland	1	0	0	1
18	United States	0	4	6	10
19	Switzerland	0	3	0	3
20	Cuba	0	1	2	3
21	Japan	0	1	1	2
22	Lithuania	0	1	0	1
23	Norway	0	0	1	1
Totals (23 entries)		39	39	39	117
