= 1994 UCI Track Cycling World Championships =

Cycling world championships

- Venue: Palermo, Italy
- Dates: August, 1994
- Velodrome: Paolo Borsellino Velodrome
- Events: 11

The 1994 UCI Track Cycling World Championships were the World Championship for track cycling. They took place in Palermo, Italy in August 1994. Eleven events were contested, eight for men and three for women.

In the same period, the 1994 UCI Road World Championships were also organized in Sicily.

== Medal summary ==
Event	Gold	Silver	Bronze
Men's Events
Men's sprint	Marty Nothstein; United States	Darryn Hill; Australia	Michael Hübner; Germany
Men's 1 km time trial	Florian Rousseau; France	Erin Hartwell; United States	Shane Kelly; Australia
Men's keirin	Marty Nothstein; United States	Michael Hübner; Germany	Federico Paris; Italy
Men's points race	Bruno Risi; Switzerland	Jan Bo Petersen; Denmark	Franz Stocher; Austria
Men's individual pursuit	Chris Boardman; Great Britain	Francis Moreau; France	Jens Lehmann; Germany
Men's team pursuit	Germany; Andreas Bach; Guido Fulst; Jens Lehmann; Danilo Hondo	United States; Mariano Friedick; Dirk Copeland; Carl Sundquist; Adam Laurent	Australia; Brett Aitken; Stuart O'Grady; Rodney McGee; Tim O'Shannessey
Men's tandem	France; Fabrice Colas; Frédéric Magné	Germany; Emanuel Raasch; Jens Glücklich	Italy; Federico Paris; Roberto Chiappa
Men's motor-paced	Carsten Podlesch; Germany	Roland Königshofer; Austria	Alessandro Tresin; Italy
Women's Events
Women's sprint	Galina Yenyukhina; Russia	Felicia Ballanger; France	Oksana Grishina; Russia
Women's points race	Ingrid Haringa; Netherlands	Svetlana Samokhvalova; Russia	Ludmilla Gorojanskaja; Belarus
Women's individual pursuit	Marion Clignet; France	Svetlana Samokhvalova; Russia	Janie Eickhoff; United States

== Medal table ==
Rank	Nation	Gold	Silver	Bronze	Total
1	France (FRA)	3	2	0	5
2	Germany (DEU)	2	2	2	6
3	United States (USA)	2	2	1	5
4	Russia (RUS)	1	2	1	4
5	Great Britain (GBR)	1	0	0	1
5	Netherlands (NLD)	1	0	0	1
5	Switzerland (SUI)	1	0	0	1
8	Australia (AUS)	0	1	2	3
9	Austria (AUT)	0	1	1	2
10	Denmark (DEN)	0	1	0	1
11	Italy (ITA)	0	0	3	3
12	Belarus (BLR)	0	0	1	1
Totals (12 entries)		11	11	11	33

== See also ==
- 1994 UCI Road World Championships
