= 1989 UCI Track Cycling World Championships =

Cycling championship

- Venue: Lyon, France
- Dates: August, 1989
- Velodrome: Vélodrome Georges-Préveral
- Events: 15

The 1989 UCI Track Cycling World Championships were the World Championship for track cycling. They took place in Lyon, France, in August 1989. Fifteen events were contested, 12 for men (5 for professionals, 7 for amateurs) and 3 for women.

In the same period, the 1989 UCI Road World Championships were organized in Chambéry.

== Medal summary ==
Event	Gold	Silver	Bronze
Men's Professional Events
Men's keirin	Claudio Golinelli; Italy	Patrick Da Rocha; France	Masatoshi Sako; Japan
Men's sprint	Claudio Golinelli; Italy	Yuichiro Kamiyama; Japan	Hideyuki Matsui; Japan
Men's individual pursuit	Colin Sturgess; Great Britain	Dean Woods; Australia	Régis Clère; France
Men's points race	Urs Freuler; Switzerland	Gary Sutton; Australia	Martin Penc; Czechoslovakia
Men's motor-paced	Giovanni Renosto; Italy	Walter Brugna; Italy	Torsten Rellensmann; West Germany
Men's Amateur Events
Men's 1 km time trial	Jens Glücklich; East Germany	Martin Vinnicombe; Australia	Alexandre Kiritchenko; Soviet Union
Men's sprint	Bill Huck; East Germany	Michael Hübner; East Germany	Nikolaï Kovch; Soviet Union
Men's individual pursuit	Viatcheslav Ekimov; Soviet Union	Jens Lehmann; East Germany	Steffen Blochwitz; East Germany
Men's team pursuit	East Germany; Steffen Blochwitz; Carsten Wolf; Thomas Liese; Guido Fulst	Soviet Union; Viatcheslav Ekimov; Evgueni Berzin; Dmitri Nelyubin; Michail Orlov	Italy; Marco Villa; Giovanni Lombardi; Ivan Cerioli; David Solari
Men's points race	Marat Satybaldeiev; Soviet Union	Fabio Baldato; Italy	Leo Peelen; Netherlands
Men's motor-paced	Roland Königshofer; Austria	Tonino Vittigli; Italy	Thomas Königshofer; Austria
Men's tandem	France; Fabrice Colas; Frédéric Magné	Czechoslovakia; Jiří Illek; Lubomír Hargaš	Italy; Andrea Faccini; Federico Paris
Women's Events
Women's sprint	Erika Salumäe; Soviet Union	Galina Yenyuchina; Soviet Union	Isabelle Gautheron; France
Women's individual pursuit	Jeannie Longo; France	Petra Rossner; East Germany	Barbara Ganz; Switzerland
Women's points race	Jeannie Longo; France	Barbara Ganz; Switzerland	Janie Eickhoff; United States

== Medal table ==
Rank	Nation	Gold	Silver	Bronze	Total
1	Italy (ITA)	3	3	2	8
2	East Germany (GDR)	3	3	1	7
3	Soviet Union (URS)	3	2	2	7
4	France (FRA)	3	1	2	6
5	Switzerland (SUI)	1	1	1	3
6	Austria (AUT)	1	0	1	2
7	Great Britain (GBR)	1	0	0	1
8	Australia (AUS)	0	3	0	3
9	Japan (JPN)	0	1	2	3
10	Czechoslovakia (TCH)	0	1	1	2
11	Netherlands (NED)	0	0	1	1
11	United States (USA)	0	0	1	1
11	West Germany (FRG)	0	0	1	1
Totals (13 entries)		15	15	15	45

== See also ==
- 1989 UCI Road World Championships
