= 1988 UCI Track Cycling World Championships =

- Venue: Ghent, Belgium
- Date: 21–25 August 1988
- Velodrome: Blaarmeersen
- Events: 9

The 1988 UCI Track Cycling World Championships were the World Championship for track cycling. They took place in Ghent, Belgium from 21 to 25 August 1988. Eight events were contested, 7 for men (5 for professionals, 2 for amateurs) and 1 for women with a demonstration non-Championship points race for women.

In the same period, the 1988 UCI Road World Championships were organized in Ronse.

== Medal summary ==
Event	Gold	Silver	Bronze
Men's Elite Events
Men's keirin	Claudio Golinelli; Italy	Ottavio Dazzan; Italy	Michel Vaarten; Belgium
Men's sprint	Stephen Pate; Australia	Claudio Golinelli; Italy	Nobuyuki Tawara; Japan
Men's individual pursuit	Lech Piasecki; Poland	Tony Doyle; Great Britain	Jesper Worre; Denmark
Men's points race	Daniel Wyder; Switzerland	Adriano Baffi; Italy	Michael Marcussen; Denmark
Men's motor-paced	Danny Clark; Australia	Constant Tourné; Belgium	Walter Brugna; Italy
Men's Amateur Events
Men's motor-paced	Vincenzo Colamartino; Italy	Roland Königshofer; Austria	Roland Renn; Germany
Men's tandem	France; Fabrice Colas; Frédéric Magné	West Germany; Greil Hans-Jürgen; Uwe Butchmann	Czechoslovakia; Jiří Illek; Lubomír Hargaš
Women's Events
Women's individual pursuit	Jeannie Longo; France	Barbara Ganz; Switzerland	Mindee Mayfield; United States
Women's points race	Sally Hodge; Great Britain	Barbara Ganz; Switzerland	Monique de Bruin; Netherlands

== Medal table ==
Rank	Nation	Gold	Silver	Bronze	Total
1	Australia (AUS)	2	0	0	2
1	France (FRA)	2	0	0	2
3	Italy (ITA)	1	2	1	4
4	Switzerland (SUI)	1	2	0	3
5	Great Britain (GBR)	1	1	0	2
6	Poland (POL)	1	0	0	1
7	Belgium (BEL)	0	1	1	2
8	Austria (AUT)	0	1	0	1
8	West Germany (FRG)	0	1	0	1
10	Denmark (DEN)	0	0	2	2
11	Czechoslovakia (TCH)	0	0	1	1
11	Japan (JPN)	0	0	1	1
11	Netherlands (NED)	0	0	1	1
11	United States (USA)	0	0	1	1
Totals (14 entries)		8	8	8	24

== See also ==
- 1988 UCI Road World Championships
