= 1992 UCI Track Cycling World Championships =

Cycling world championships

- Venue: Valencia, Spain
- Date: 1992
- Velodrome: Luis Puig Velodrome
- Events: 6 for professionals, 2 for amateurs

The 1992 UCI Track Cycling World Championships were the World Championship for track cycling. They took place in Valencia, Spain.

In the same period, the 1992 UCI Road World Championships were organized in Benidorm, Spain.

== Medal table ==
Rank	Nation	Gold	Silver	Bronze	Total
1	Germany (GER)	3	0	0	3
2	Switzerland (SUI)	2	1	0	3
3	Italy (ITA)	1	1	1	3
4	United States (USA)	1	0	1	2
5	Netherlands (NED)	1	0	0	1
6	Australia (AUS)	0	1	1	2
6	France (FRA)	0	1	1	2
6	Lithuania (LTU)	0	1	1	2
9	Czech Republic (CZE)	0	1	0	1
9	Denmark (DEN)	0	1	0	1
9	Great Britain (GBR)	0	1	0	1
12	Argentina (ARG)	0	0	1	1
12	Austria (AUT)	0	0	1	1
12	Belgium (BEL)	0	0	1	1
Totals (14 entries)		8	8	8	24

== Medal summary ==
Event	Gold	Silver	Bronze
Men's Professional Events
Sprint	Michael Hübner; Germany	Frédéric Magné; France	Erik Schoefs; Belgium
Keirin	Michael Hübner; Germany	Stephen Pate; Australia	Frédéric Magné; France
Points race	Bruno Risi; Switzerland	Jonas Romanovas; Lithuania	Juan Esteban Curuchet; Argentina
Individual pursuit	Mike McCarthy; United States	Shaun Wallace; Great Britain	Artūras Kasputis; Lithuania
Men's motor-paced	Peter Steiger; Switzerland	Jens Veggerby; Denmark	Antonio Fanelli; Italy
Men's Amateur Events
Men's tandem	Italy; Gianluca Capitano; Federico Paris	Czechoslovakia; Lubomír Hargaš; Masaro Saito	Australia; Anthony Peden; David Dew
Men's motor-paced	Carsten Podlesch; Germany	David Solari; Italy	Roland Königshofer; Austria
Women's Events
Points race	Ingrid Haringa; Netherlands	Barbara Ganz; Switzerland	Janie Eickhoff; United States
