= Artūras Kasputis =

Lithuanian cyclist (born 1967)

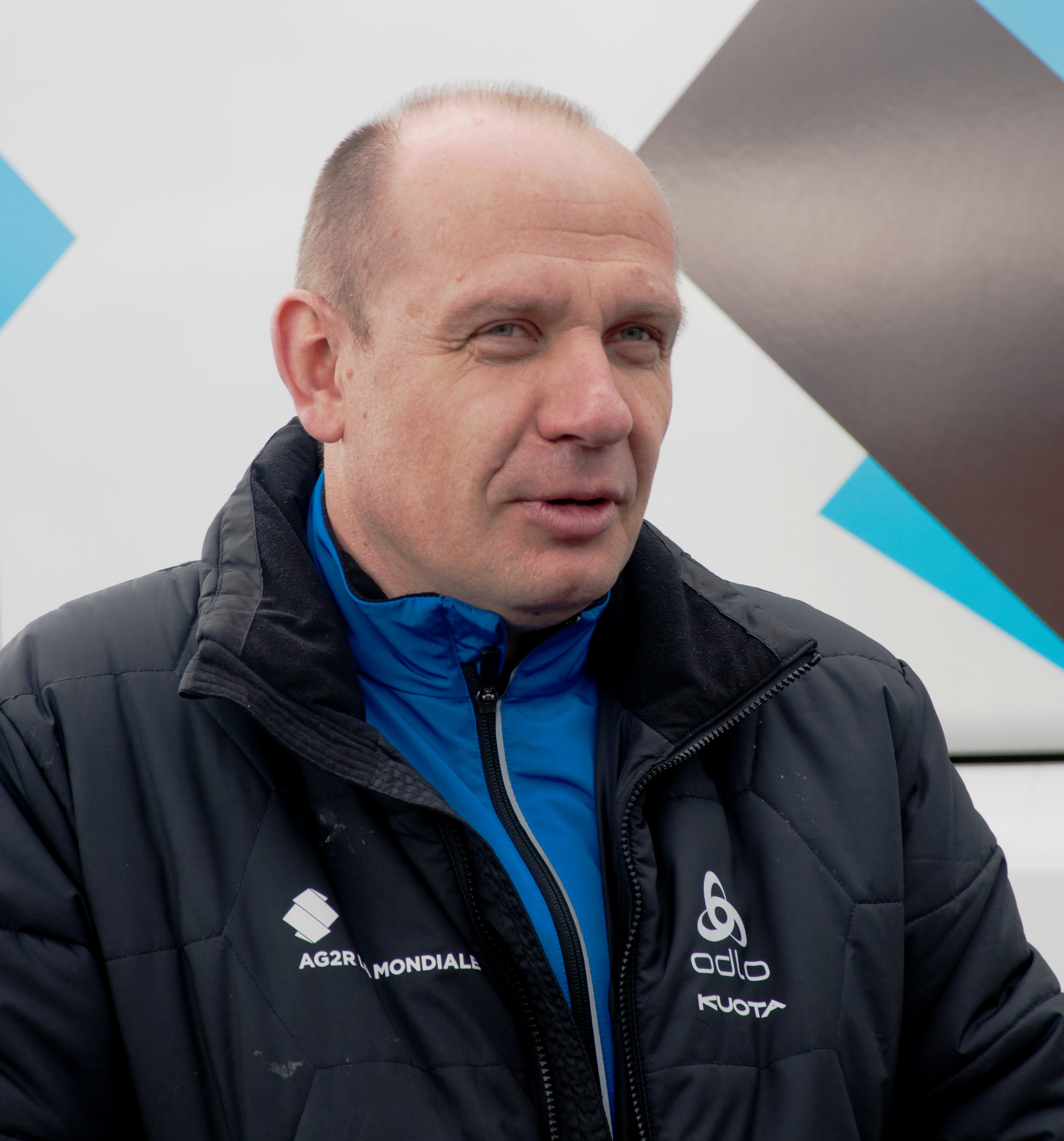
- Kasputis at the 2012 Tour de Romandie

Personal information
- Full name: Artūras Kasputis
- Born: 22 February 1967 (age 59) Klaipėda, Lithuanian SSR, Soviet Union

Cycling career
- Sport: Cycling
- Disciplines: Road and track
- Role: Rider

Professional teams
- 1992: Postobón
- 1993–2002: Chazal–MBK

Managerial team
- 2013–: Ag2r–La Mondiale
Medal record
Men's track cycling
Representing the Soviet Union
Olympic Games
Gold medal – first place	1988 Seoul	Team Pursuit
World Championships
Bronze medal – third place	1987 Vienna	4km Individual Pursuit
Representing Lithuania
World Championships
Bronze medal – third place	1992 Valencia	4km Individual Pursuit

Artūras Kasputis (born 26 February 1967) is a retired track and road racing cyclist from Lithuania, who represented the USSR at the 1988 Summer Olympics in Seoul, South Korea. There he won the gold medal in the men's 4.000 team pursuit, alongside Viacheslav Ekimov, Dmitry Nelyubin and Gintautas Umaras. During the Soviet time he trained at Dynamo sports society in Klaipėda. He was a professional road cyclist from 1992 to 2002, and afterwards became a cycling manager in the professional circuit.

== Major results ==
1987
1st Overall Tour du Maroc
1990
1st Stage 1 Vuelta a Colombia
1991
1st Overall Circuito Montañés
1st Circuit du Port de Dunkerque
Vuelta a Colombia

1st Prologue & Stage 7

3rd Overall Ronde de l'Isard
3rd Overall Tour du Poitou Charentes et de la Vienne
1992
1st Route d'Occitanie
1st Overall Route du Sud

1st Stage 2a (ITT)

1st Chrono des Herbiers
5th Overall Vuelta a Murcia
6th Grand Prix des Nations
1993
2nd Overall Ronde de l'Isard
1994
1st Stage 1a Route du Sud (ITT)
3rd Overall Critérium du Dauphiné Libéré
4th Overall Tour de Luxembourg
4th Chrono des Herbiers
1995
5th Overall Tour du Limousin
6th Overall Circuit Cycliste Sarthe
1996
1st Stage 1 Critérium du Dauphiné Libéré
5th Overall 4 Jours de Dunkerque
9th Overall Circuit Cycliste Sarthe
1997
8th Overall Route du Sud
9th Overall 4 Jours de Dunkerque
1998
2nd Overall 4 Jours de Dunkerque
2nd Overall Tour du Vaucluse
5th Overall Circuit des Mines
1999
1st Overall Circuit des Mines

1st Stage 7 (ITT)

1st Prologue Tour de l'Ain
National Road Championships

2nd Time trial
6th Road race

8th Grand Prix des Nations
2000
1st Stage 4b Danmark Rundt (ITT)
2nd Overall 4 Jours de Dunkerque

1st Stage 2

9th Overall Tour de Picardie
10th Overall Étoile de Bessèges
2001
7th Overall Circuit des Mines
2002
3rd Overall Circuit Cycliste de la Sarthe
7th Overall Tour of Belgium
9th Overall Grote Prijs Erik Breukink
