= 1987 World Juniors Track Cycling Championships =

- Venue: Dalmine, Italy
- Date: August 1987

The 1987 World Juniors Track Cycling Championships were the 13th annual Junior World Championships for track cycling held in Dalmine, Italy in August 1987.

The Championships had five events for men (sprint, points race, individual pursuit, team pursuit and 1 kilometre time trial) and two for women (sprint and individual pursuit).

== Events ==
Event	Gold	Silver	Bronze
Men's Events
Sprint	Eyk Pokorny; Germany	Tomas Tschage; East Germany	Federico Paris; Italy
Points race	Marcel Beumer; Netherlands	Stefan Steinweg; Germany	Evgueny Anachkine; Soviet Union
Individual pursuit	Evgueny Anachkine; Soviet Union	Marcel Beumer; Netherlands	Michael Rich; West Germany
Team pursuit	Mikhail Orlov; Dimitri Zhdanov; Vadim Kravchenko; Valeri Butaro; Soviet Union	Giovanni Lombardi; Gianluca Gorini; Andrea Collinelli; Ivan Beltrami; Italy	Guido Fulst; Jorg Pawelczyk; Frank Demel; Jurgem Weber; East Germany
Time trial	Ronny Kirchhoff; East Germany	Jury Emilianov; Soviet Union	Bernardo Gonzalez Minano; Spain

Event	Gold	Silver	Bronze
Women's Events
Sprint	Janie Quigley-Eickhoff; United States	Nathalie Lancien-Even; France	Vita Brakmanee; Soviet Union
Individual pursuit	Janie Quigley-Eickhoff; United States	Catherine Marsal; France	Anja Fidseler; East Germany

== Medal table ==
* Host nation (Italy)

Rank	Nation	Gold	Silver	Bronze	Total
1	Soviet Union (URS)	2	1	2	5
2	United States (USA)	2	0	0	2
3	East Germany (DDR)	1	1	2	4
4	Germany (GER)	1	1	0	2
4	Netherlands (NED)	1	1	0	2
6	France (FRA)	0	2	0	2
7	Italy (ITA)*	0	1	1	2
8	Spain (SPA)	0	0	1	1
8	West Germany (FRG)	0	0	1	1
Totals (9 entries)		7	7	7	21
