= Steffen Blochwitz =

East German cyclist (born 1967)

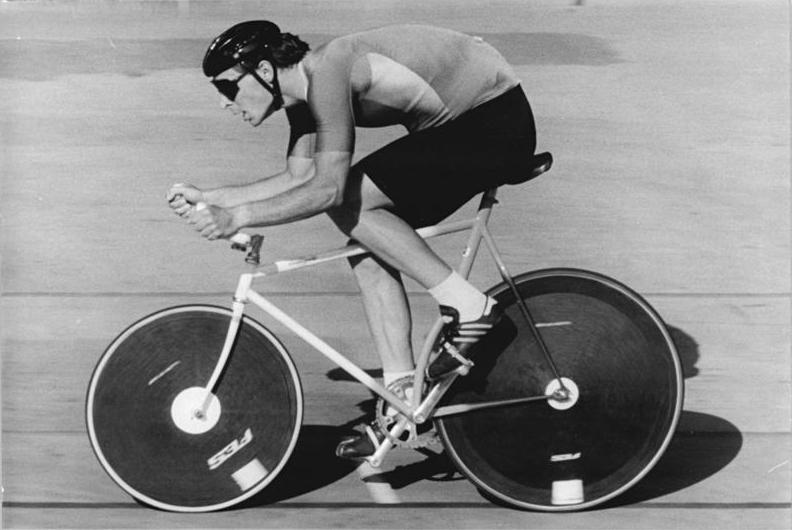
- Steffen Blochwitz in 1989

Personal information
- Born: 8 September 1967 (age 59) Herzberg, East Germany
- Height: 1.84 m (6 ft 0 in)
- Weight: 81 kg (179 lb)

Cycling career
- Sport: Cycling
- Current team: Retired
- Disciplines: Road; Track
- Role: Rider

Amateur team
- SC Cottbus

Professional teams
- 1995–1996: Vredestein–Fortezza
- 1997–1999: Agro–Adler Brandenburg
Medal record
Representing East Germany
Olympic Games
Silver medal – second place	1988 Seoul	Team pursuit
UCI World Championships
Silver medal – second place	1986 Colorado Springs	Team pursuit
Silver medal – second place	1987 Vienna	Team pursuit
Gold medal – first place	1989 Lyon	Team pursuit
Bronze medal – third place	1989 Lyon	Individual pursuit

Steffen Blochwitz (born 8 September 1967) is a German former road and track cyclist. He was part of the East German team that won a silver medal in the 4000 m team pursuit and the 1988 Summer Olympics. Between 1986 and 1989 he won four medals in the individual and team pursuit at world championships.

As a road racer, he won two stages of the Olympia's Tour in 1987 and one in 1989. He won the Sachsen Tour in 1991, OZ Wielerweekend in 1993 and Thüringen Rundfahrt der U23 in 1995.

== Major results ==
1987
1st Stages 5b (ITT) & 6 Olympia's Tour
1988
1st Stages 1b (ITT) & 7b (ITT) Niedersachsen-Rundfahrt
1989
1st Prologue (ITT) Olympia's Tour
1991
1st Overall Sachsen Tour
1993
1st Overall OZ Wielerweekend

1st Stage 2

1994
3rd Overall Course de la Solidarité Olympique
1995
1st Overall Thüringen Rundfahrt
1st Stage 6 Niedersachsen-Rundfahrt
1997
1st Stage 9 Peace Race
