= Nobuyuki Tawara =

Japanese cyclist

Personal information
- Full name: Nobuyuki Tawara
- Born: 22 September 1964 (age 62) Asahikawa, Japan

Cycling career
- Sport: Cycling
- Discipline: Track
- Role: Rider
- Rider type: Sprinter
Medal record
Men's track cycling
Representing Japan
World Championships
Gold medal – first place	1987 Vienna	Sprint
Bronze medal – third place	1986 Colorado Springs	Sprint
Bronze medal – third place	1988 Ghent	Sprint

Nobuyuki Tawara (俵 信之, Tawara Nobuyuki; 22 September 1964) is a Japanese former track cyclist who won the sprint competition at the 1987 UCI Track Cycling World Championships, along with bronze medals in the same event in 1986 and 1988. He was also a professional keirin cyclist with over 400 wins.
