= Federico Paris =

Italian cyclist

Personal information
- Born: 9 November 1969 (age 56) Rho, Lombardy, Italy

Cycling career
- Sport: Cycling
- Current team: Retired
- Discipline: Track
- Role: Rider
Medal record
Men's track cycling
Representing Italy
World Championships
Gold medal – first place	1990 Maebashi	Tandem
Gold medal – first place	1992 Valencia	Tandem
Gold medal – first place	1993 Hamar	Tandem
Bronze medal – third place	1989 Lyon	Tandem
Bronze medal – third place	1994 Palermo	Keirin
Bronze medal – third place	1994 Palermo	Tandem
Bronze medal – third place	1995 Bogotá	Keirin
World Junior Championships
Bronze medal – third place	1987 Dalmine	Sprint

Federico Paris (born 9 November 1969) is an Italian former professional track cyclist. He won the tandem at the UCI Track Cycling World Championships three times; in 1990 and 1992 with Gianluca Capitano, and in 1993 with Roberto Chiappa. He also won bronze medals in the event in 1989 and 1994, in addition to bronze medals in the keirin in 1994 and 1995.

His daughter Laura competed in rhythmic gymnastics.

He now works as a cycling official and for several years was the technical director of the Italian national sprint team.
