= Gintautas Umaras =

Lithuanian cyclist (born 1963)

Personal information
- Born: 20 May 1963 (age 63) Kaunas, Lithuanian SSR, Soviet Union

Cycling career
- Sport: Cycling
Medal record
Men's cycling
Representing Soviet Union
Olympic Games
Gold medal – first place	1988 Seoul	Individual Pursuit
Gold medal – first place	1988 Seoul	Team Pursuit
World Championship
Gold medal – first place	1987 Vienna	4 km Indiv. Pursuit
Gold medal – first place	1987 Vienna	4 km Team Pursuit
Silver medal – second place	1986 Colorado Springs	4 km Indiv. Pursuit
Silver medal – second place	1985 Bassano del Grappa	4 km Indiv. Pursuit show-medals = yes

Gintautas Umaras (born 20 May 1963) is a retired track and road racing cyclist from Lithuania, who represented the USSR at the 1988 Summer Olympics in Seoul, South Korea. There he won the gold medal in the men's 4 km individual pursuit and in the men's team pursuit, alongside Viatcheslav Ekimov, Dmitry Nelyubin and Artūras Kasputis. During the Soviet time he trained at Dynamo sports society in Klaipėda.

For most of his career, he competed for the Soviet Union. He was a professional road cyclist from 1989 to 1991. Umaras achieved several world records: in 1984 he broke the record in men's 5 km individual pursuit; in 1985, 1986, and 1987 – in men's 4 km individual pursuit; and in 1988 – in men's 4 km team pursuit.

Umaras was among the people who helped to establish the National Olympic Committee of Lithuania when Lithuania regained independence from the Soviet Union. He was appointed as one of its vice presidents. Gintautas and his brother Mindaugas run several sport equipment shops in Vilnius and Klaipėda.

== Major results ==
1988
Olympic Games

1st Individual pursuit
1st Team pursuit
