= Karen Holliday =

New Zealand cyclist

Personal information
- Born: Karen Margaret Erikson; 12 February 1966 (age 60) Nelson, New Zealand

Cycling career
- Sport: Cycling
- Disciplines: Road and track
- Role: Rider

Major wins
- World champion, points race (1990) (New Zealand) National champion, road race (1990)

Karen Margaret Holliday MBE (née Erikson, born 12 February 1966) is a former New Zealand road and track cyclist.

== Biography ==
Holliday was born Karen Margaret Erikson in Nelson on 12 February 1966, and was educated at Nelson College for Girls. In 1985, she married Daryl Holliday, and the couple went on to have three children.

Holliday won the world title in the women's points race at the 1990 UCI Track Cycling World Championships in Maebashi, and in doing so became the first New Zealander to win a world cycling title. At the same championship she finished fourth in the road race. Holliday also won the 1990 New Zealand women's road race title.

In the 1991 New Year Honours, Holliday was appointed a Member of the Order of the British Empire, for services to cycling. She was named as New Zealand sportswoman of the year for 1990 at the Halberg Awards.

She was inducted into the New Zealand Sports Hall of Fame in 1997.

Awards
Preceded by Erin Baker	New Zealand's Sportswoman of the Year; 1990	Succeeded by Philippa Baker
