= Sally Hodge =

Welsh track cyclist (born 1966)

Personal information
- Full name: Sally Ann Hodge-McKenzie
- Born: 31 May 1966 (age 60) Cardiff, Wales, United Kingdom
- Height: 1.54 m (5 ft 1 in)
- Weight: 57 kg (126 lb)

Cycling career
- Sport: Cycling
- Disciplines: Road & Track
- Role: Rider
- Rider type: Sprinter

Amateur team
- Cardiff Ajax CC
Medal record
Women's track cycling
Representing Great Britain
UCI Track Cycling World Championships
Gold medal – first place	1988 Ghent	Points race
Commonwealth Games
Bronze medal – third place	1994 Victoria	Points race

Sally Ann Hodge-McKenzie (born 31 May 1966) is a Welsh former track cyclist from Cardiff, Wales.

== Cycling career ==
She was the first ever women's points race world champion at the 1988 UCI Track Cycling World Championships in Ghent, Belgium. She represented Britain at the 1988 Summer Olympics in Seoul, South Korea and the 1992 Summer Olympics in Barcelona, Spain. She won the bronze medal at the 1994 Commonwealth Games in Victoria, British Columbia, Canada.

In addition to her international success she was a 13 times British track champion, winning the British National Individual Sprint Championships in 1983 and 1985, the British National Points Championships in 1987, 1988, 1991, 1992, 1993 & 1994, the British National Individual Pursuit Championships in 1987 and 1988 and the British National Individual Time Trial Championships in 1985, 1987 and 1988.

== Canlyniadau ==
1983
1st British National Individual Sprint Championships

1985
1st British National Individual Sprint Championships
1st British National Individual Time Trial Championships

1987
1st British National Points Championships
1st British National Individual Pursuit Championships
1st British National Individual Time Trial Championships
2nd British National Road Race Championships

1988
1st UCI Track Cycling World Championships - Women's Points Race
1st British National Points Championships
1st British National Individual Pursuit Championships
1st British National Individual Time Trial Championships
2nd British National Road Race Championships
9th Cycling at the 1988 Summer Olympics - Women's individual road race

1989
1st British National Points Championships

1991
1st British National Points Championships

1992
1st British National Points Championships
45th Cycling at the 1992 Summer Olympics – Women's road race

1993
1st British National Points Championships

1994
1st British National Points Championships
3rd Points race, Commonwealth Games
