= Frédéric Magné =

French cyclist

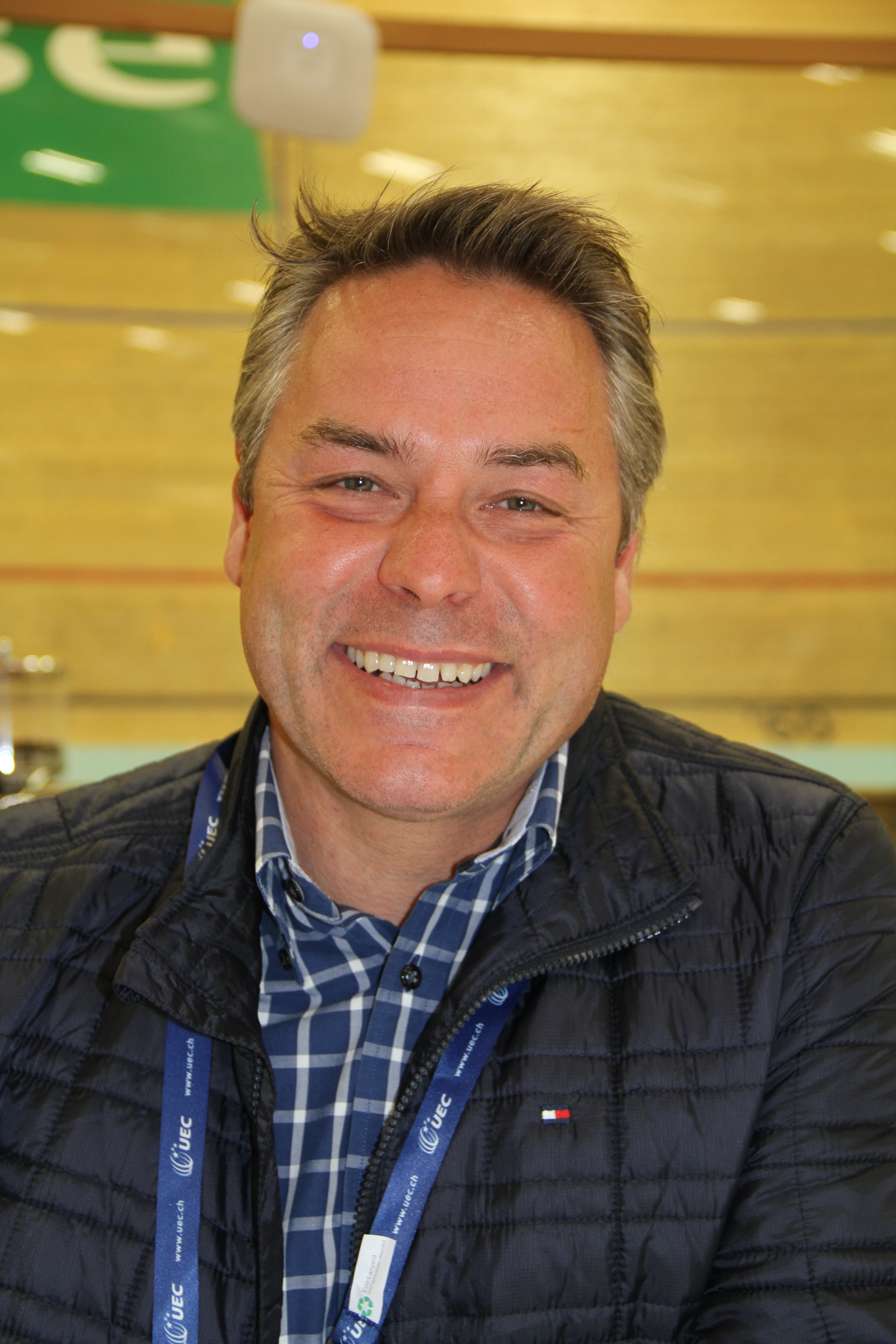
- Magné at the 2015 UEC European Track Championships

Personal information
- Full name: Frédéric Magné
- Born: 5 February 1969 (age 57) Orléans, France

Cycling career
- Sport: Cycling
- Discipline: Track
- Role: Rider
- Rider type: Sprint
Medal record
Representing France
Men's track cycling
World Championships
Gold medal – first place	1987 Vienna	Tandem
Gold medal – first place	1988 Ghent	Tandem
Gold medal – first place	1989 Lyon	Tandem
Gold medal – first place	1994 Palermo	Tandem
Gold medal – first place	1995 Bogotá	Keirin
Gold medal – first place	1997 Perth	Keirin
Gold medal – first place	2000 Manchester	Keirin
Silver medal – second place	1992 Valencia	Sprint
Bronze medal – third place	1992 Valencia	Keirin
Bronze medal – third place	1996 Manchester	Keirin
Bronze medal – third place	1995 Bogotá	Sprint
Bronze medal – third place	1999 Berlin	Keirin

Frédéric Magné (born 5 February 1969) is a French former track cyclist. Magné was the world champion in keirin in 1995, 1997 and 2000 and in tandem in 1987, 1988, 1989 and 1994, each time with Fabrice Colas. He also rode at four Olympic Games.

== Palmarès ==
1987
World Championships, Vienna

Gold, Tandem (Amateurs, with Fabrice Colas)

1988
World Championships, Ghent

Gold, Tandem (Amateurs, with Colas)

1989
World Championships, Lyon

Gold, Tandem (Amateurs, with Colas)

1991
French National Track Championships

Gold, 1 km time trial (Amateurs)

1992
World Championships, Valencia

Bronze, Keirin
Silver, Sprint

French National Track Championships

Gold, Sprint

1993
French National Track Championships

Bronze, Sprint

1994
World Championships, Palermo

Gold, Tandem (with Colas)

French National Track Championships

Gold, Sprint

1995
World Championships, Bogotá

Gold, Keirin
Bronze, Sprint

1st, Bordeaux Six Days (with Etienne De Wilde)

1996
World Championships, Manchester

Bronze, Keirin

French National Track Championships

Silver, Sprint

1997
World Championships, Perth

Gold, Keirin

French National Track Championships

Bronze Sprint

1998
World Cup

1st, Keirin, Victoria
2nd, Team sprint, Victoria
1st, Sprint, Victoria
2nd, Team sprint, Berlin
2nd, Sprint, Berlin

1999
World Championships, Berlin

Bronze, Keirin

French National Track Championships

Bronze Sprint

2000
World Championships, Manchester

Gold, Keirin

French National Track Championships

Bronze Sprint

== See also ==
- List of World Championship medalists in men's keirin
