= Janie Eickhoff =

American cyclist

Personal information
- Full name: Janie Quigley-Eickhoff
- Born: June 15, 1970 (age 56) Long Beach, California
- Height: 5 ft 2 in (157 cm)

Cycling career
- Sport: Cycling
- Discipline: Track
- Role: Rider
- Rider type: Endurance
Medal record
Representing the United States
Women's track cycling
World Championships
Silver medal – second place	1991 Stuttgart	Individual pursuit
Silver medal – second place	1996 Manchester	Points race
Bronze medal – third place	1989 Lyon	Points race
Bronze medal – third place	1991 Stuttgart	Points race
Bronze medal – third place	1992 Valencia	Points race
Bronze medal – third place	1993 Hamar	Individual pursuit
Bronze medal – third place	1994 Palermo	Individual pursuit
World Junior Championships
Gold medal – first place	1987 Dalmine	Individual pursuit
Gold medal – first place	1987 Dalmine	Sprint

Janie Quigley-Eickhoff (born June 15, 1970) is an American former professional racing cyclist. She is a seven time medalist at the UCI Track Cycling World Championships, four times in the points race and three times in the individual pursuit. She also won the national points race championships five times, and the individual pursuit four times in addition to five wins at the UCI Track Cycling World Cup.

As a junior rider, Eickhoff also won the sprint and individual pursuit at the 1987 World Juniors Track Cycling Championships.

She was inducted into the United States Bicycling Hall of Fame in 2015. She was also awarded the title of "Woman Amateur Cyclist of the Year" by the American Cycling Association in 1989.
