= Harumi Honda =

Japanese bicycle racer and keirin cyclist

Personal information
- Born: 12 November 1963 (age 62)

Cycling career
- Sport: Cycling
- Current team: Retired
- Discipline: Track
- Role: Rider
- Rider type: Sprinter

Harumi Honda (born 12 November 1963) is a Japanese former track cyclist.

== Career ==
Honda was the keirin world champion in 1987.

== Major results ==
1987
1st World Keirin Championships
1988
1st European Sprint Championships
1989
2nd European Sprint Championships
