= Mario Gentili (cyclist, born 1962) =

Italian cyclist

Personal information
- Born: 5 March 1962 (age 64) Rome, Italy

Sport
- Sport: Cycling
- Event: Track
Medal record
Representing Italy
UCI Motor-paced World Championships
Bronze medal – third place	1985 Bassano del Grappa	Amateurs
Gold medal – first place	1986 Colorado Springs	Amateurs
Gold medal – first place	1987 Vienna	Amateurs

Mario Gentili (born 5 March 1962) is a retired Italian amateur cyclist. He won the world title in motor-paced racing in 1986 and 1987, after placing third in 1985. In 1987 he also won one stage of Cinturón a Mallorca, and finished third overall.
