= Erin Baker =

New Zealand triathlete (born 1961)

Erin Baker MBE
Personal information
- Born: Erin Margaret Baker; 23 May 1961 (age 65) Kaiapoi, New Zealand

Sport
- Country: New Zealand
- Sport: Triathlon
Medal record
Women's triathlon
Representing New Zealand
ITU World Championships
Gold medal – first place	1989 Avignon	Elite
ITU Duathlon World Championships
Gold medal – first place	1991 Cathedral City	Elite
Ironman World Championship
Gold medal – first place	1987	Individual
Gold medal – first place	1990	Individual
Silver medal – second place	1988	Individual
Silver medal – second place	1991	Individual
Silver medal – second place	1993	Individual

Erin Margaret Baker MBE (born 23 May 1961) is a former New Zealand triathlete. She won many world championship and Ironman titles.

== Early life ==
Baker was born in 1961 in Kaiapoi, New Zealand. Upon the suggestion by her mother, Mary, Baker began running competitively at age 15 and showed ability right from the start. "I remember the first day Erin competed in a cross-country race. I was waiting for her to come in thinking God, she won't be very pleased because she hasn’t done very well. In fact, I missed her crossing the finish line a quarter of an hour earlier, in first place."

Baker is one of eight children. Her siblings include Philippa Baker (New Zealand rower and 1991 & 1994 Halberg award winner) and Kathy and Maureen who were both national titlists in swimming and aerobics.

== Competitive career ==
Baker was originally coached by John Hellemans but controlled and developed her successful career by self-training, "I was self-trained. I just trained as much as my body would handle, and that was a shit load. I trained and trained, and I trained more if I had time. I never got injured so I would often do more in case somebody else was training while I was resting".

In 1981 she was convicted of throwing explosive devices while protesting during the South African Rugby team tour of New Zealand. This act prevented her from entering the United States for several years, restricting her from competing in any American competitions. Baker was also known for her protests at the Hawaii Ironman competitions when she rebelled against the notion of the winner of the men's division receiving a car and the women's division winner receiving nothing for her efforts. She voiced her opinions on numerous occasions and as a result was well known as a controversial athlete.

She finished her triathlon career in 1994 with a record of 104 wins from 121 triathlons entered.

Baker was named "Triathlete of the decade" by American magazine Triathlete. The magazine commented on her success by saying, "We’ve stopped trying to figure Erin out, we just accept her as the best female triathlete that ever lived".

In the 1993 New Year Honours, Baker was appointed a Member of the Order of the British Empire, for services as a triathlete.

== Results ==
- 1984 entered and won her first ever triathlon in Sydney
- 1985 won the world middle-distance championship in Nice, France
- 1986 New Zealand Ironman female winner (9:26.3)
- 1986 Won the world middle-distance championship in Nice, France (Disqualified 8 hours post race due to rule infractions)
- 1987 New Zealand Iron Man female winner (9:17.3)
- 1987 Winner of female division at Ford Ironman championships in Hawaii (shattered previous course record)
- 1987 Winner of the world short course title
- 1988 Won the world middle-distance championship in Nice, France
- 1988 Winner of the world short course title
- 1988 Won World Championships (Olympic distance) in Canada
- 1988 Winner of the world short course title
- 1989 Named New Zealand Sportsperson of the year at Halberg awards
- 1990 Won the Women's demonstration Triathlon at the 1990 Commonwealth Games; competed in Women's 10,000 m in National championships
- 1990 Winner of female division at Ford Ironman championships in Hawaii
- 1990 New Zealand Ironman female winner (9.38.3)
- 1991 Won the World Duathlon title
- 1994 New Zealand Ironman female winner (9.54.1)
- 1994 Retired as a professional athlete
- 1995 Inducted in the New Zealand Sports Hall of Fame
- Winner of 9 Ironman titles

== Post triathlon career ==
Baker now lives in Christchurch, New Zealand, with her husband and fellow triathlete Scott Molina. Together she and Molina (nicknamed Skid) have two children.

Baker has also served as a councillor on Christchurch City Council (resigned January 2004), and has served on Canterbury District Health Board and on the boards of Jade Stadium Ltd and Christchurch and Canterbury Marketing Ltd.

Awards
Preceded by Susan Devoy	New Zealand's Sportswoman of the Year; 1989	Succeeded by Karen Holliday
Preceded by Mark Todd	Halberg Awards – Supreme Award; 1989	Succeeded by Peter Blake
