= Dynamo Stadium =

Dynamo Stadium or Dinamo Stadium is a stadium that often associated with the Dynamo (sports society).

It may also refer to:

== Albania ==
- Selman Stërmasi Stadium, Tirana, formerly "Dinamo Stadium"

== Belarus ==
- Dinamo Stadium (Brest), Belarus
- Dinamo Stadium (Minsk), Belarus

== Georgia ==
- Boris Paichadze Dinamo Arena, also known as the Dinamo Stadium, Tbilisi, Georgia

== Germany ==
- Stadion Dresden (in the 1970s), Dresden, Germany

== Moldova ==
- Dinamo Stadium (Bender), Moldova
- Dinamo Stadium (Chişinău), Moldova

== Romania ==
- Dinamo Stadium (1951), Romania

== Russia ==
- Dynamo Stadium (Barnaul)
- Dynamo Stadium (Bryansk)
- Dynamo Stadium (Makhachkala)
- Dynamo Stadium (Moscow)
- Dynamo Stadium (Stavropol)
- Dynamo Stadium (Ufa)
- Dynamo Stadium (Vladivostok)

== Ukraine ==
- Dynamo Stadium (Dnipro), today place of the Towers Apartments Hotel
- Dynamo Stadium (Kharkiv), Ukraine
- Lobanovsky Dynamo Stadium, Kyiv, Ukraine
- Dynamo Stadium (Odesa), Ukraine
- Dynamo Stadium, former name of Tsentralnyi Stadion (Zhytomyr)
- Dynamo Stadium (Poltava), Poltava

== Uzbekistan ==
- Dynamo Samarkand Stadium, Samarkand, Uzbekistan
