= Thomas Königshofer =

Austrian cyclist (born 1969)

Personal information
- Born: Vienna, Austria

Sport
- Sport: Motor-paced racing
Medal record
Representing Austria
Motor-paced World Championships
| Bronze medal – third place | 1989 Lyon | Amateurs |

Thomas Königshofer (born June 1, 1969) is a retired Austrian cyclist who won a bronze medal at the UCI Motor-paced World Championships in 1989. He is the brother of Roland Königshofer who won those championships and an uncle of Lukas Königshofer, an Austrian football player.
