= Hideyuki Matsui =

Japanese cyclist

Personal information
- Born: 14 February 1964 (age 62) Toyokawa, Aichi, Japan

Cycling career
- Sport: Cycling
- Discipline: Track
- Role: Rider
- Rider type: Sprinter
Medal record
Men's track cycling
Representing Japan
World Championships
Silver medal – second place	1986 Colorado Springs	Sprint
Silver medal – second place	1987 Vienna	Sprint
Bronze medal – third place	1989 Lyon	Sprint

Hideyuki Matsui (松井英幸, Matsui Hideyuki; 14 February 1964) is a Japanese former track cyclist who won silver medals in the sprint competition at the 1986 and 1987 UCI Track Cycling World Championships, in addition to a bronze medal in the same event in 1989. He was also a professional keirin cyclist with over 400 wins.
