= Liudmila Garajànskaia =

Belarusian cyclist

Personal information
- Born: 17 June 1970 (age 56)

Cycling career
- Sport: Cycling

Liudmila Garajànskaia (born 17 June 1970) is a Belarusian former track cyclist. She competed in the women's point race at the 1996 Summer Olympics. She aso won the bronze medal in the points race at the 1994 UCI Track Cycling World Championships.
