= Lukas Königshofer =

Austrian footballer (born 1989)

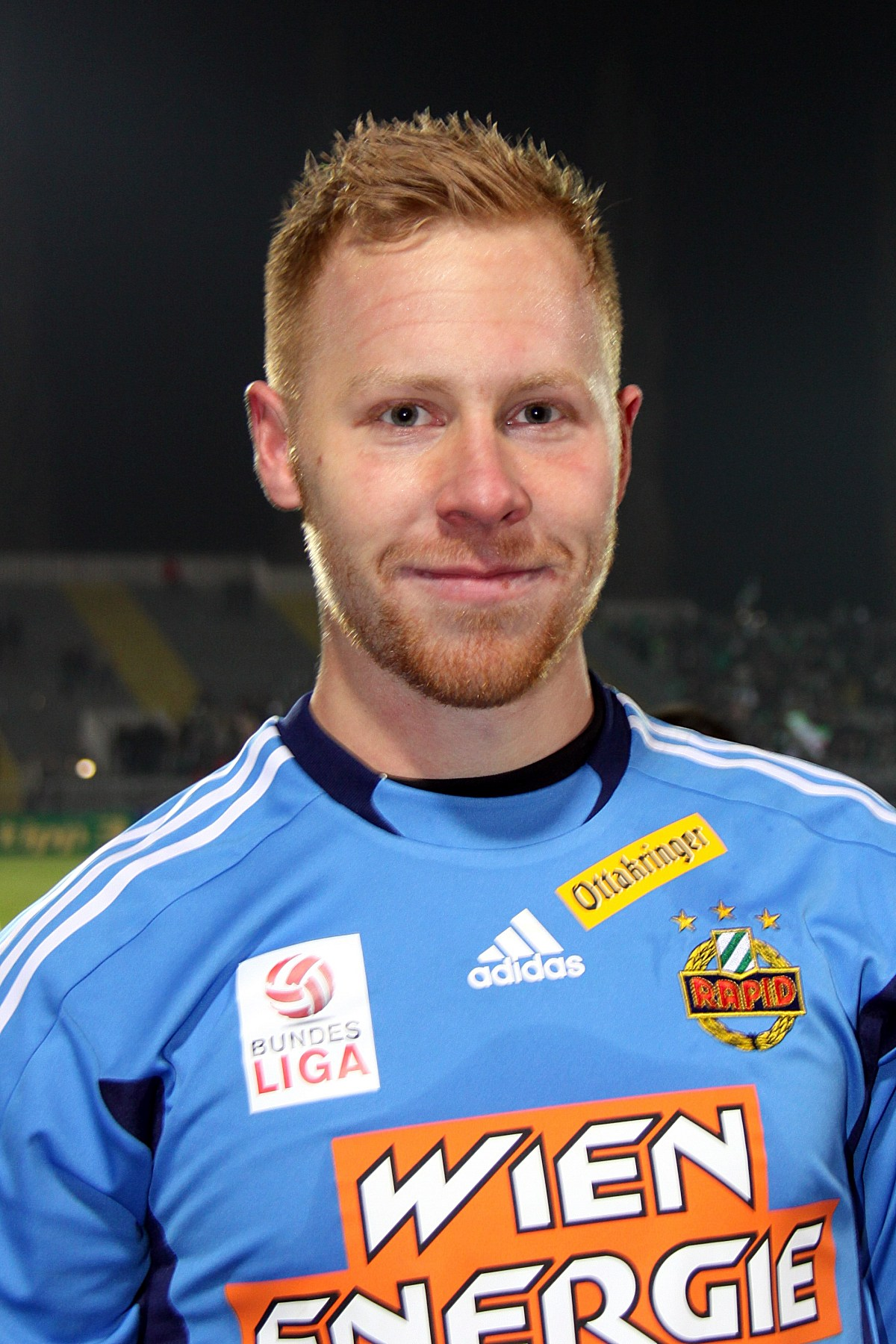
- Königshofer with Rapid Wien in 2011

Personal information
- Date of birth: 16 March 1989 (age 37)
- Place of birth: Vienna, Austria
- Height: 1.93 m (6 ft 4 in)
- Position: Goalkeeper

Youth career
- 1993–1996: Admira Wacker
- 1996–2000: Austria Wien
- 2000–2005: Admira Wacker
- 2005–2006: Kärnten

Senior career*
Years	Team	Apps	(Gls)
2006–2007	Kärnten Amateure	1	(0)
2007–2008	Austria Kärnten Amateure	18	(0)
2008–2009	Austria Kärnten	0	(0)
2009–2014	Rapid Wien Amateure	31	(0)
2011–2014	Rapid Wien	46	(0)
2014–2016	Hallescher FC	9	(0)
2016–2017	Stuttgarter Kickers	36	(0)
2017–2019	SpVgg Unterhaching	43	(0)
2019–2021	Uerdingen 05	42	(0)

International career
2006	Austria U19	1	(0)
2008–2009	Austria U20	2	(0)
2008–2010	Austria U21	5	(0)
- * Club domestic league appearances and goals as of 21:04, 12 October 2022 (UTC)

Lukas Königshofer (born 16 March 1989) is an Austrian professional footballer who plays as a goalkeeper.

== Club career ==
Since his contract with Rapid Wien expired in summer 2014, Königshofer went for trial sessions at Hallescher FC in May of that year. On 29 July 2014, it was announced that he had signed for Halle on a two-year contract.

== Personal life ==
His father Roland Königshofer is a former Olympic cyclist.
