= Claudio Golinelli =

Italian cyclist

Personal information
- Born: 1 May 1962 (age 64) Piacenza, Italy

Cycling career
- Sport: Cycling
- Current team: Retired
- Disciplines: Track, Road
- Role: Rider
- Rider type: Sprinter, Keirin

Professional teams
- 1984–1985: Murella–Rossin
- 1986–1988: Ecoflam–Jollyscarpe–BFB Bruciatori–Alfa Lum
- 1988: Pepsi-Cola–Fanini–FNT
- 1989–1990: Polli–Mobiexport
- 1991–1993: Olympia–Basso
Medal record
Men's track cycling
Representing Italy
World Championships
Gold medal – first place	1988 Ghent	Keirin
Gold medal – first place	1989 Lyon	Keirin
Gold medal – first place	1989 Lyon	Sprint
Silver medal – second place	1987 Vienna	Keirin
Silver medal – second place	1990 Maebashi	Sprint
Silver medal – second place	1991 Stuttgart	Keirin
Bronze medal – third place	1987 Vienna	Sprint
Bronze medal – third place	1990 Maebashi	Keirin

Claudio Golinelli (born 1 May 1962) is an Italian former professional road and track cyclist.

== Major results ==
=== Track ===
1985
1st Keirin, National Championships
3rd Sprint, European Championships
1986
1st Sprint, National Championships
3rd Sprint, European Championships
1987
1st Keirin, National Championships
UCI World Championships

2nd Keirin
3rd Sprint

1988
1st Keirin, UCI World Championships
National Championships

1st Keirin
1st Sprint

1989
UCI World Championships

1st Keirin
1st Sprint

1st Sprint, National Championships
1990
National Championships

1st Keirin
1st Sprint

UCI World Championships

2nd Sprint
3rd Keirin

1991
National Championships

1st Keirin
1st Sprint

2nd Keirin, UCI World Championships

=== Road ===
1983
1st Gran Premio della Liberazione
1989
1st Millemetri del Corso di Mestre
1990
1st Prologue Settimana Internazionale Coppi e Bartali
1991
2nd Millemetri del Corso di Mestre
1992
1st Millemetri del Corso di Mestre
