= Marcel Beumer =

Dutch cyclist

Personal information
- Full name: Marcel Antonius Christianus Beumer
- Born: 12 March 1969 Hoogland, Netherlands
- Height: 183 cm (6 ft 0 in)
- Weight: 68 kg (150 lb)

Cycling career
- Sport: Cycling
- Discipline: Track cycling

Marcel Antonius Christianus Beumer (born 12 March 1969 in Ede) is a track cyclist from the Netherlands. He competed in the men's team pursuit at the 1988 Summer Olympics, finishing 12th.

== See also ==
- List of Dutch Olympic cyclists
