= Patrick Da Rocha =

French cyclist (born 1961)

Personal information
- Born: 22 February 1961 (age 65) Villepinte, Seine-Saint-Denis, France

Cycling career
- Sport: Cycling
- Discipline: Track
- Role: Rider
- Rider type: Sprinter
Medal record
Men's track cycling
Representing France
World Championships
Silver medal – second place	1989 Lyon	Keirin

Patrick Da Rocha (born 22 February 1961) is a French former professional track cyclist.

He won the French professional sprint championship title three times in a row from 1986 to 1988. In 1989, he won the silver medal in the keirin at the world championships in Lyon.
