= Pavel Soukup (cyclist) =

Czech cyclist

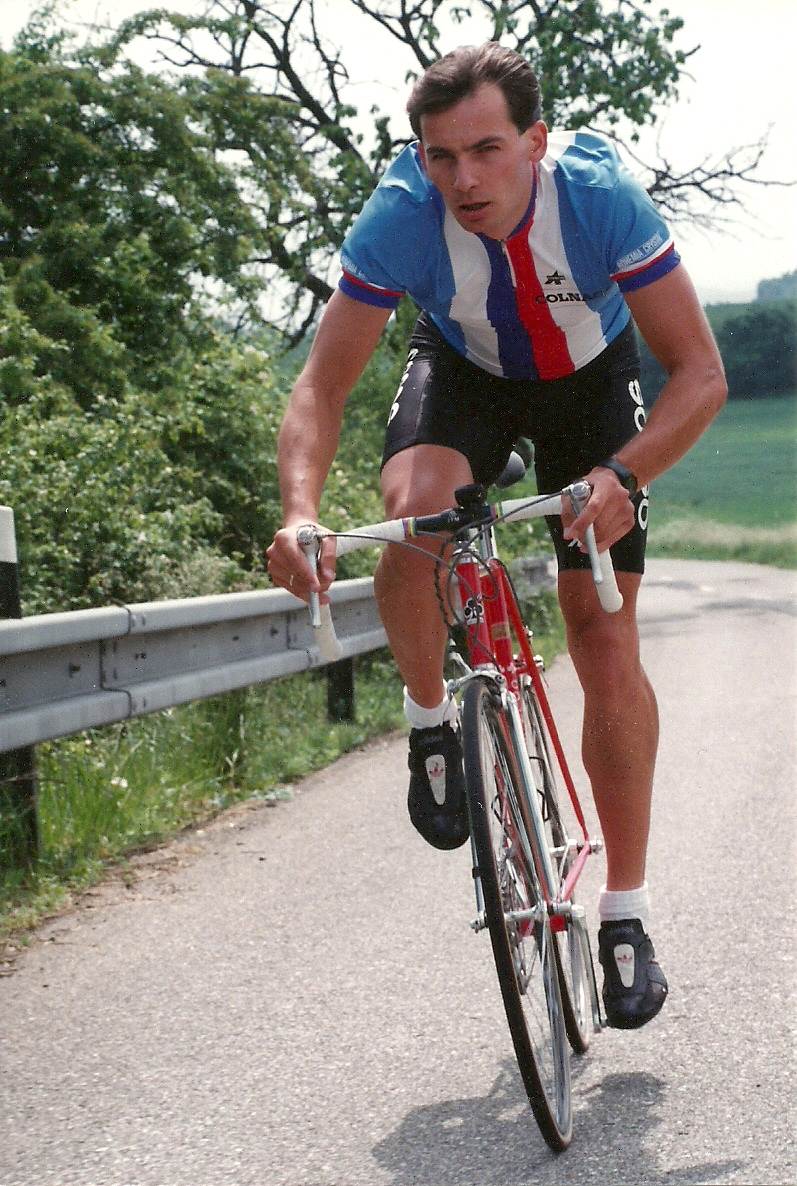
- Pavel Soukup in 1992

Personal information
- Born: 12 April 1965 (age 61) Přerov, Czechoslovakia

Cycling career
- Sport: Cycling
Medal record
Representing Czechoslovakia
World Championships
| Bronze medal – third place | 1983 Zürich | Team pursuit |
| Gold medal – first place | 1986 Colorado Springs | Team pursuit |
| Bronze medal – third place | 1987 Wien | Team pursuit |
Friendship Games
| Bronze medal – third place | 1984 Moscow | Team pursuit |
Goodwill Games
| Silver medal – second place | 1986 Moscow | Team pursuit |

Pavel Soukup (born 12 April 1965) is a Czech former cyclist, a participant in the World Championships in the years 1982 – 1990. In 1986 he won a gold medal in team pursuit race with Svatopluk Buchta, Teodor Černý and Aleš Trčka in Colorado Springs. He also finished on the third place in 1983 and 1987 at the same discipline. He missed the 1984 Summer Olympics due to their boycott by Czechoslovakia and competed in the Friendship Games instead, winning a bronze medal in the team pursuit. He competed in the team pursuit event at the 1988 Summer Olympics.
