= Dynamo Sports Club =

Sports club founded in the Soviet Union

Dynamo Society
- Logo of the society
- Full name: Public-State Association "All-Russian Physical Culture and Sports Society «Dynamo»"
- Founded: 18 April 1923; 103 years ago
- Based in: Moscow, Russia
- Chairman: Anatoly Nikolaevich Gulevsky (since 5 December 2019)
- Website: www.dynamo.su
- Wordmark of the society

Dynamo flag

Dynamo or Dinamo (Russian: Динамо, romanized: Dinamo; Ukrainian: Динамо, romanized: Dynamo; Belarusian: Дынама, romanized: Dynama; Georgian: დინამო, romanized: dinamo) is a public sports and fitness society with its headquarters in Moscow, Russia. It was originally created in 1923 in the Soviet Union as an all-Soviet sports organization, with branches established within each union republic. The society functioned as an association of multi-sport clubs in various cities, with athletes historically drawn from the NKVD and, after World War II, from the MVD and the KGB.

With the Soviet occupation of Eastern Europe after World War II, similar Dynamo societies were established throughout the Eastern Bloc, such as SV Dynamo in East Germany. In 1960, the All-Russian sports and fitness society Dynamo was established and operated on the territory of the Russian SFSR within the Soviet Union. Following the dissolution of the Soviet Union, the Dynamo central office merged into the All-Russian sports and fitness society Dynamo, while the Dynamo offices of other union republics, which became independent nations, began functioning as separate foreign organizations.

Today, Dynamo operates as a multi-sport association and fitness society headquartered in Moscow, Russia, maintaining its historical network of sports clubs across Russia and cooperating with former Dynamo organizations in other post-Soviet states and Eastern European countries.

== Overview ==
=== Name ===
The name given to the society was supposed to mean "Power in Motion", taken from the Greek: δύναμις; dynamis -power, and Latin: motio, -motion. Not coincidentally, this term was first coined by a Belgian inventor, Zénobe Gramme, for the electrical generator. Dynamo, together with the Armed Forces sports societies, made up the universal system of physical education and sports of the USSR. Forty-five sports disciplines were sanctioned by the society in 1971. It had some 6,000 sports facilities and 43 Children and Youth Sport Schools.

=== History ===
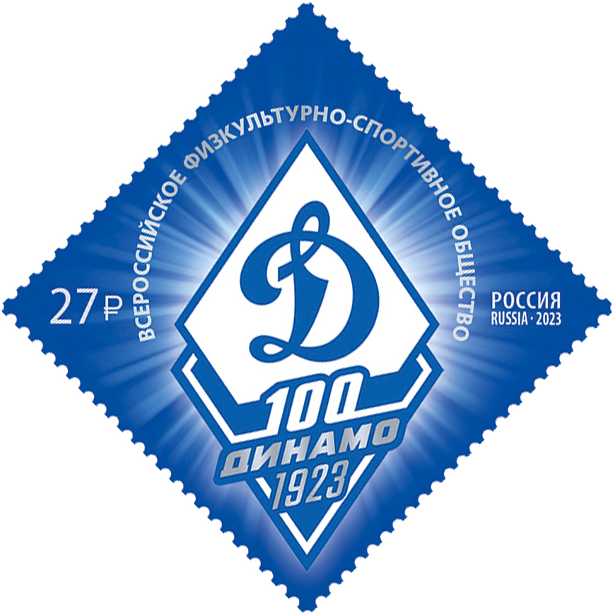
Russian stamp dedicated to the 100th anniversary of Dynamo

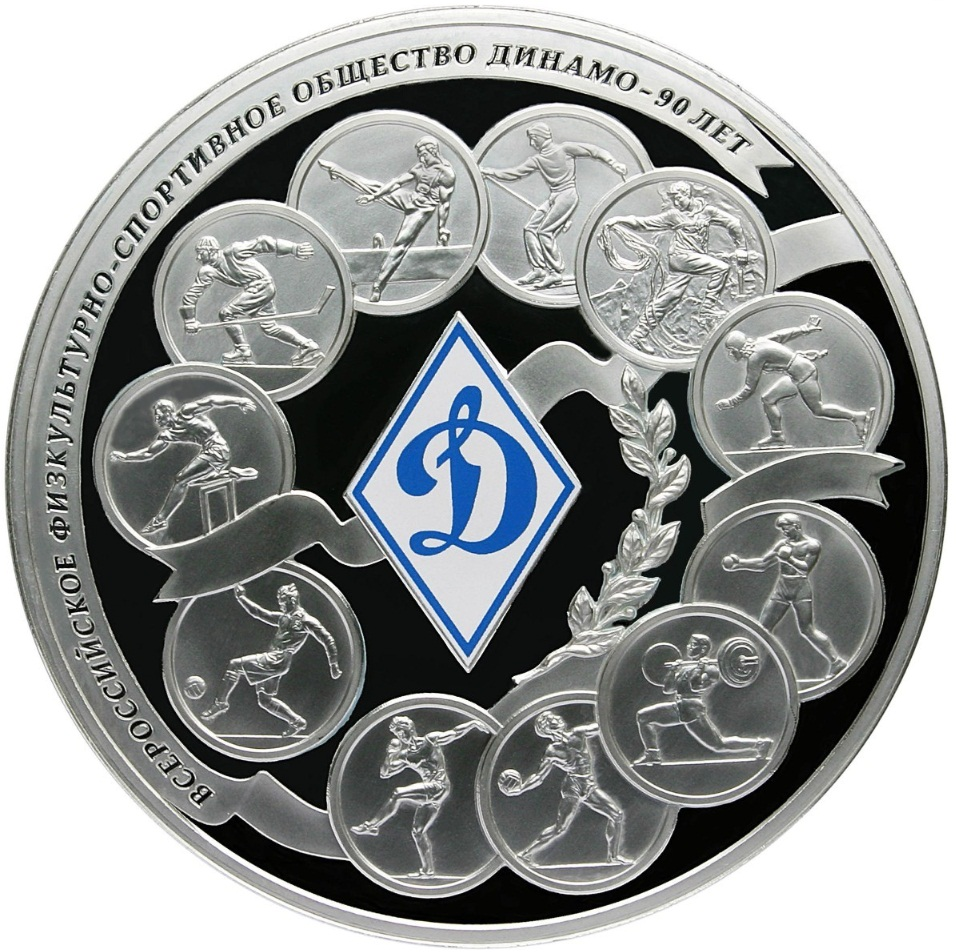
Coin of the All-Russian Fitness-Sports Society "Dynamo"

The "Dinamo" society was officially created on 18 April 1923, on Felix Dzerzhinsky's initiative and under the sponsorship of the State Political Directorate (GPU), the Soviet political police, the predecessor of other later created Soviet security structures such as KGB, NKVD and MVD. For the rest of the society's history in the Soviet period, it maintained some connection with the state security apparatus. The forerunner of Dynamo was the State Political Directorate Physical Culture society that existed since 1917.

On 12 August 1923 in Moscow at Orlovo-Davydovsky pereulok (lane) was opened the first Dynamo stadium named after Dzerzhinsky. On 23 August 1923 the presidium of the Moscow Proletarian Sports Society Dynamo reviewed a petition of the Penza Governorate GPU Political Department about establishing of the local Proletarian Sports Society Dynamo. This was the first practical step in development of departmental sports society on nationwide scale. On 1 – 16 September 1923 the Moscow Proletarian Sports Society Dynamo participated in the First All-Union Festival of Physical Culture in Moscow. On 11 September 1923 the Moscow Proletarian Sports Society Dynamo dispatched two of its members to Petrograd to organize local Dynamo society in the city. On 2 October 1923 the All-Union Council of Physical Culture considering specifics of the GPU activities admitted as practical the existence of the GPU sports organization "Dynamo". On 16 October 1923 the All-Union Council of Physical Culture adopted a resolution "About Central Council of the PSS Dynamo". On 11 December 1923 Dynamo opened its own cinema theater at Rusakovskaya ulica in Moscow.

On 2 January 1924 there was opened the first Dynamo specialized store at Kuznetsky bridge in Moscow. On 1 August 1924 Genrikh Yagoda was appointed one of the members of the All-Union Council of Physical Culture from OGPU. On 1 October 1924 OGPU issued its order "On establishment of the Central Council of proletarian sports societies (PSS) Dynamo and about organization of local PSS Dynamo". The Central Council was officially founded on 8 October, but its functions continued to be performed by council of the Moscow PSS Dynamo until April 1926.

On 22 November 1927 the society became a sponsor of Fizkultura i sport publisher and mandated its members to subscribe to the publisher's magazine. On 8 August 1929 took place a final match of the First All-Union football championship of Dynamo society, which involved over 40 teams. During the game Dynamo Moscow beat Dynamo Ukraine becoming the first champions. In 1932 there existed 309 regional PSS and 2249 district-level cells of Dynamo.

On 22 November 1935 Central Council of the Dynamo sports society dispatched a brigade of Dynamo for three months to help organize sports activities at the mine "Central coal mine – Irmino" on help call of Alexey Stakhanov. On 26 November 1935 Central Council of Dynamo congratulated "Dynamo–Ukraine" with 5th anniversary in organization of the first in the Soviet Union sports aviation by group of enthusiasts from Kharkiv. Experience of the Ukrainian aviation section was used to unfold activities in training of pilots in the Dynamo's organization system as well as the Osoaviakhim. At the end of 1935 Central Council of Komsomol and Presidium of the All-Union Council of Physical Culture adopted a decision to pay leading sports people for their physical culture activities.

On 14 December 1936 Central Council of Dynamo paid all its players and coach of the football team 500 rubles at the end of season. In 1937 the sports club was honored with the Soviet Order of Lenin. On 16 November 1938 chairman of the All-Union Committee of Physical Culture and Sports recognized Dynamo as a founding father of Sambo martial art.

In 1939 all regional Proletarian Sports Society were merged into one All-Union fitness and sports society "Dynamo". On 31 July 1940 the Government Commission honored the Dynamo sports society with Red Banner for performance in the All-Union Physical Culture parade at the Moscow's Red Square.

On 23 July 1941, the Central Council of the Dynamo sports society was evacuated to Kazan due to advancement of Nazi Germany to Moscow.

On 31 August 1954 the central council and all leadership posts of the sports society became fully elected rather than being appointed as before.

The name of the society also became well-known internationally through many clubs in various sports, initially created under the auspices of the Soviet Dynamo society (a partial list of sports includes football (soccer), bandy, ice hockey, basketball, volleyball, and handball) or just bore the name "Dynamo", with many such clubs attaining much international acclaim, such as in football: KF Dinamo Tirana, Dinamo Baku, FC Dinamo București, Dinamo Sofia, FC Dynamo Kyiv, FC Dynamo Moscow, FC Dinamo Tbilisi, FC Dinamo Minsk, FC Dinamo Brest, JK Dünamo Tallinn, NK Dinamo Zagreb (Croatia), Sportvereinigung Dynamo (East Germany: including BFC Dynamo, SG Dynamo Dresden and SC Dynamo Berlin), in ice hockey: HC Dynamo Moscow, Dynamo Kyiv (now Sokil Kyiv), HC Dinamo Minsk, and Dinamo Riga. Similarly-named clubs were created in many countries of the Eastern bloc. Many clubs, now transformed into the regular private clubs of their respective national leagues, still function under their original Dinamo or Dynamo name but their history is the only connection with the old Dynamo society.

On 19 April 2023, in honour of the centennial anniversary, the Dynamo Society was awarded the Order of Alexander Nevsky and a modern museum of the All-Russian Physical Culture and Sports Society was opened, combining multimedia technologies and sports relics.

== Structure ==
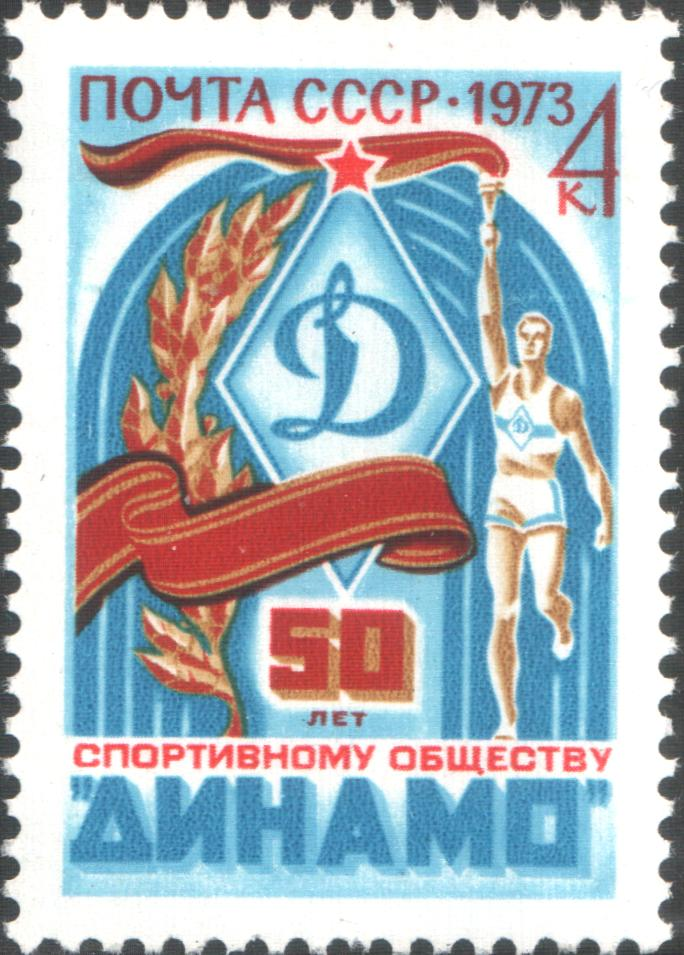
1973 Soviet post stamp honoring 50th anniversary

Currently, Dynamo is an All-Russian fitness-sports society based in Moscow. The society also has several affiliations abroad in Albania, Armenia, Azerbaijan, Belarus, Bulgaria, Estonia, Georgia, Kazakhstan, Kyrgyzstan, Latvia, Moldova, Romania, Tajikistan, Turkmenistan, Ukraine and Uzbekistan.

There is the International coordination council of Dynamo's organizations which includes:

- Sports Association "Interclub" of Ministry of Interior (Albania)
- Sports Public Organization "Dynamo" (Armenia)
- Republican State-Public Union "Belarusian Fitness-Sports Society Dynamo"
- Fitness-Sports Club "Dynamo" (Georgia)
- Sports Organization "Fiamme ORO" of Ministry of Interior (Italy)
- Public Union "Fitness-Sports Society Dynamo" (Kazakhstan)
- Public Union "Kyrgyz Fitness-Sports Society Dynamo"
- Sports Society "Dynamo" (Latvia)
- Central Sports Club "Dynamo" of Ministry of Interior (Moldova)
- Sports Organization "Khuch"
- Public-State Union "All-Russian Fitness-Sports Society Dynamo"
- Sports Society "Dynamo" (Romania)
- Sports Society "Dynamo" of Ministry of Interior (Tajikistan)
- Sports Club "Galkan" of Ministry of Interior (Turkmenistan)
- Fitness-Sports Society "Dynamo" (Ukraine)

Several organizations are observers:

- Fitness-Sports Charter "Dynamo" (Georgia)
- Sports Society of Ministry of Interior (Azerbaijan)
- Fitness-Sports Society "Dynamo" (Uzbekistan)

== Chairs of the Central Council ==
=== Chairs of the Society ===
- 1923 Felix Dzerzhinsky (honorary)
- 1923 – 1923 Józef Unszlicht
- 1923 – 1929 Genrikh Yagoda
- 1929 – 1931 Stanislav Messing
- 1931 – 1933 Vsevolod Balitsky
- 1933 – 1936 Georgy Prokofyev
- 1936 – 1938 Mikhail Frinovsky

=== Chairs of the Central Council ===
- 1939 – 1941 Ivan Maslennikov
- 1941 – 1943 Viktor Abakumov (interim)
- 1943 – 1946 Boris Obruchnikov
- 1946 – 1948 Arkadiy Apollonov
- 1950 – 1951 Nikolay Selivanovsky
- 1951 – 1951 Sergei Goglidze
- 1951 – 1953 Alexey Yepishev
- 1953 – 1953 Ivan Maslennikov
- 1953 – 1960 Semyon Perevyortkin
- 1973 – 1986 Pyotr Bogdanov

== Notable members ==
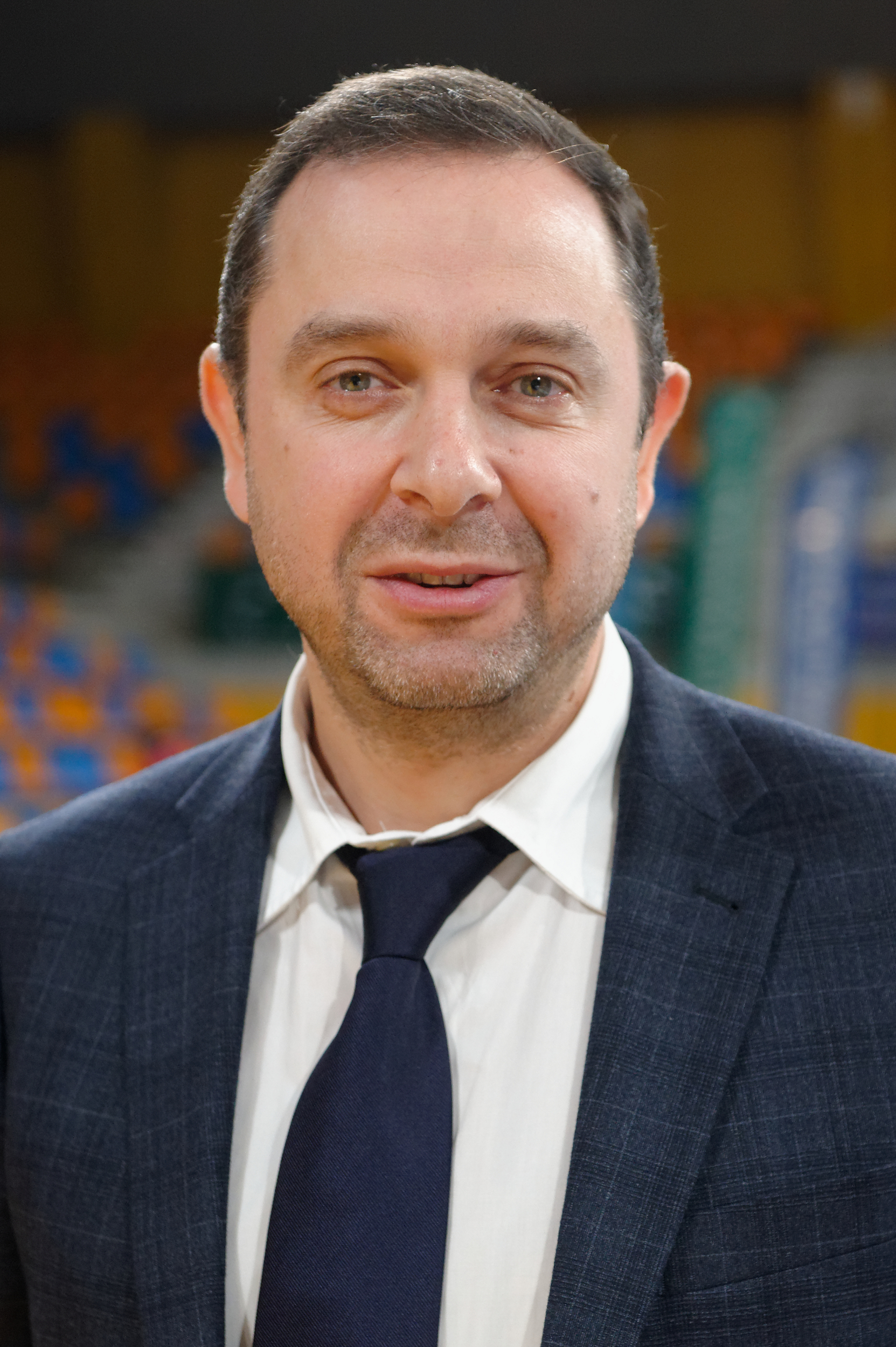
Vadym Gutzeit

- Ludmilla Tourischeva (artistic gymnastics)
- Natalia Shaposhnikova (artistic gymnastics)
- Viktor Saneyev (athletics)
- Tatiana Ovechkina (basketball)
- Aleksandr Tikhonov (biathlon)
- Valeri Popenchenko (boxing)
- Uladzimir Parfianovich (canoeing)
- David Bronstein (chess)
- Vyacheslav Vedenin (cross-country skiing)
- Gintautas Umaras (cycling)
- Vadym Gutzeit (fencing)
- Alexandr Romankov (fencing)
- Iosif Vitebskiy (born 1938), epee fencer, Soviet Ukrainian Olympic medalist and world champion and fencing coach
- Aleksandr Gorshkov (figure skating)
- Lev Yashin (football)
- Vyacheslav Atavin (handball)
- Aleksandr Maltsev (ice hockey)
- Viktor Kosichkin (speed skating)
- Igor Polyansky (swimming)
- Alex Metreveli (tennis)
- Yury Zakharevich (weightlifting)
- Viktoria Komova (artistic gymnastics)

== See also ==
- KF Dinamo Tirana
- Dinamo Riga (original)
- FC Dynamo Kyiv
- FC Dinamo București
- FC Dinamo Minsk
- Dynamo Moscow
  - FC Dynamo Moscow
  - Dynamo Moscow Bandy Club
- FK Dinamo Samarqand
- Dynamo Kazan Bandy Club
- FC Dinamo Tbilisi
- FC Dinamo Batumi
- GNK Dinamo Zagreb
- SV Dynamo
- Voluntary Sports Societies of the USSR
- Dynamo Stadium
- Dynamo Dresden
- Berliner FC Dynamo
- Levski Sofia
