= Stephen Pate =

Australian racing cyclist

Personal information
- Full name: Stephen Pate
- Born: 25 January 1964 (age 62) Melbourne, Australia

Cycling career
- Sport: Cycling
- Discipline: Track
- Role: Rider
Medal record
Representing Australia
Men's track cycling
World Championships
Gold medal – first place	1988 Ghent	Sprint
Silver medal – second place	1992 Valencia	Keirin
Silver medal – second place	1993 Hamar	Men's tandem
Silver medal – second place	1996 Manchester	Madison
Bronze medal – third place	1990 Maebashi	Sprint

Stephen Pate (born 25 January 1964) is an internationally competitive cyclist and former Olympian. After turning pro in 1986, Pate won three world pro medals and set as many world pro records for 200m, 500m, and 1 km. In 1991, he won a bronze medal at the World Professional Championship at Stuttgart. However, he and his fellow Australian Carey Hall later tested positive for steroids and were stripped of their medals.
