= Svetlana Samokhvalova =

Russian cyclist

Personal information
- Full name: Svetlana Anatolyevna Samokhvalova
- Born: 20 December 1972 (age 53) Moscow, Soviet Union

Cycling career
- Sport: Cycling
- Disciplines: Road cycling, Track cycling
- Role: Rider

Svetlana Anatolyevna Samokhvalova (original name: Светлана Анатольевна Самохвапова; born 20 December 1972) is a track and road cyclist from Russia. She participated at the 1992 Summer Olympics in two track cycling disciplines without representing a country as part of the Unified Team. She represented Russia on the road at the 1996 Summer Olympics in the women's road race and women's time trial.
