= Michael Hübner =

German track cyclist (1959–2024)

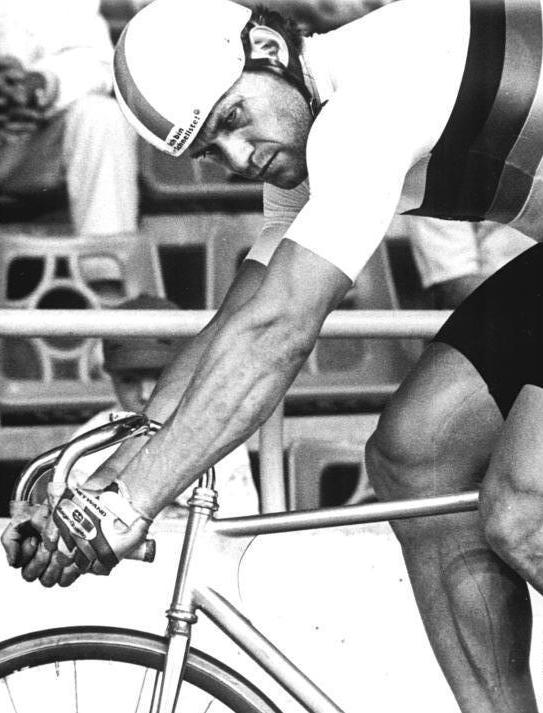
- Hübner in 1989

Personal information
- Full name: Michael Hübner
- Born: 8 April 1959 Karl-Marx-Stadt, East Germany
- Died: 12 November 2024 (aged 65) Chemnitz, Saxony, Germany

Cycling career
- Sport: Cycling
- Discipline: Track
- Role: Rider
- Rider type: Sprint
Medal record
Men's track cycling
Representing East Germany
World Championships (Amateur)
Gold medal – first place	1986 Colorado Springs	Sprint
Silver medal – second place	1985 Bassano del Grappa	Sprint
Silver medal – second place	1987 Vienna	Sprint
Silver medal – second place	1989 Lyon	Sprint
Bronze medal – third place	1983 Zürich	Sprint
Representing Germany
World Championships (Professional/Elite)
Gold medal – first place	1990 Maebashi	Sprint
Gold medal – first place	1990 Maebashi	Keirin
Gold medal – first place	1991 Stuttgart	Keirin
Gold medal – first place	1992 Valencia	Keirin
Gold medal – first place	1992 Valencia	Sprint
Gold medal – first place	1995 Bogotá	Team Sprint
Silver medal – second place	1993 Hamar	Sprint
Silver medal – second place	1994 Palermo	Keirin
Silver medal – second place	1995 Bogotá	Keirin
Silver medal – second place	1996 Manchester	Team Sprint
Bronze medal – third place	1994 Palermo	Sprint

Michael Hübner (8 April 1959 – 12 November 2024) was a German professional sprint track cyclist, who became world champion in sprint, Keirin, and team sprint. He died in Chemnitz, Saxony on 12 November 2024, at the age of 65.

Records
Preceded by Sergei Kopylov	Men's 200 meter time trial world record holder 8 July 1986 – 2 August 1987	Succeeded by Nikolai Kovsh
