= Roland Hennig =

East German cyclist (born 1967)

Personal information
- Born: 19 December 1967 (age 58) Hoyerswerda, Bezirk Cottbus, East Germany
- Height: 1.87 m (6 ft 2 in)
- Weight: 78 kg (172 lb)

Sport
- Sport: Cycling
- Club: SC Cottbus
Medal record
Representing East Germany
Olympic Games
Silver medal – second place	1988 Seoul	Team pursuit
World championships
Silver medal – second place	1986 Colorado Springs	Team pursuit
Silver medal – second place	1987 Vienna	Team pursuit

Roland Hennig (born 19 December 1967) is a retired East German cyclist. He had his best achievements in the 4000 m team pursuit, winning silver medals at the world championships of 1986 and 1987 and at the 1988 Summer Olympics.

As a road racer, he won two stages of the Tour de Liège in 1987, finishing in second place overall. In 1988 he won the European Police Championships.
