= Svatopluk Buchta =

Czech cyclist

Personal information
- Born: 26 February 1966 (age 60) Brno, Czechoslovakia

Cycling career
- Sport: Cycling

Svatopluk Buchta (born 26 February 1966) is a Czech former cyclist. He competed at the 1988 Summer Olympics and the 1992 Summer Olympics.
