= Roland Königshofer =

Austrian cyclist (born 1962)

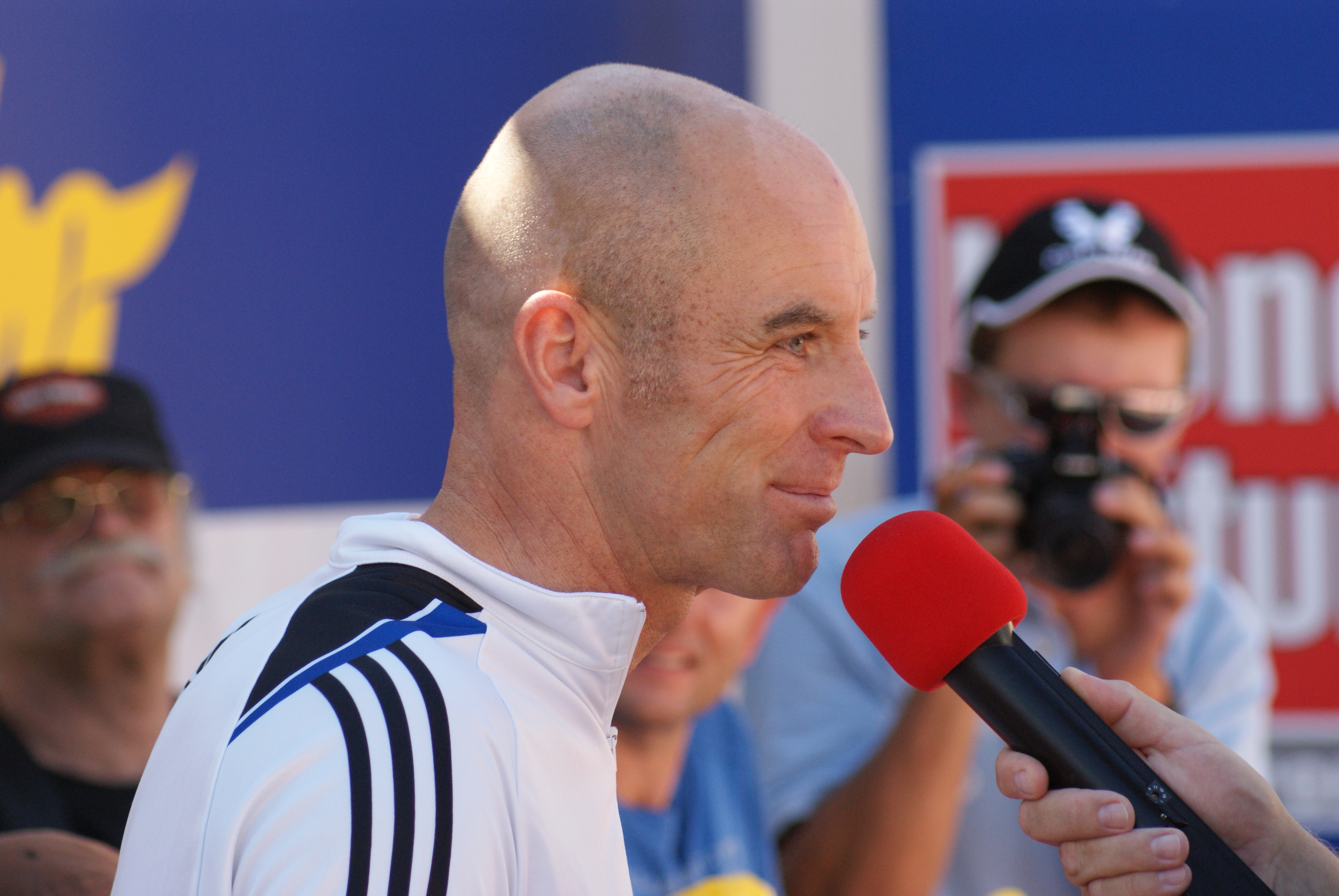
- Roland Königshofer in 2010

Personal information
- Born: 24 October 1962 (age 63) Neunkirchen, Austria
- Height: 1.81 m (5 ft 11 in)
- Weight: 66 kg (146 lb)

Sport
- Sport: Motor-paced racing
Medal record
Representing Austria
Motor-paced World Championships
Silver medal – second place	1985 Bassano del Grappa	Amateurs
Bronze medal – third place	1986 Zurich	Amateurs
Bronze medal – third place	1987 Viena	Amateurs
Silver medal – second place	1988 Ghent	Amateurs
Gold medal – first place	1989 Lyon	Amateurs
Gold medal – first place	1990 Maebashi	Amateurs
Gold medal – first place	1991 Stuttgart	Amateurs
Bronze medal – third place	1992 Valencia	Amateurs
Silver medal – second place	1993 Hamar	Professionals
Silver medal – second place	1994 Palermo	Professionals

Roland Königshofer (born 24 October 1962) is a retired Austrian cyclist. He won a medal at every UCI Motor-paced World Championships between 1985 and 1994, until the championships were discontinued, either in the amateurs (1985–1992) or professionals category (1993–1994). He also competed at the 1988 Summer Olympics in the 4000 m team pursuit and points race and finished in 16th and 12th place, respectively.

His son Lukas (b. 1989) is a football player. His brother Thomas is also a retired cyclists; he finished third at the UCI Motor-paced World Championships in 1989 behind Roland.
