= Canada at the 1996 Summer Olympics =

- IOC code: CAN
- NOC: Canadian Olympic Committee
- Website: www.olympic.ca (in English and French)

in Atlanta
- Competitors: 303 (152 men and 151 women) in 25 sports
- Flag bearer (opening): Charmaine Crooks
- Flag bearers (closing): Kathleen Heddle & Marnie McBean
- Medals Ranked 21st: Gold 3 Silver 11 Bronze 8 Total 22

Summer Olympics appearances (overview)
- ~~1900~~; 1904; 1908; 1912; 1920; 1924; 1928; 1932; 1936; 1948; 1952; 1956; 1960; 1964; 1968; 1972; 1976; 1980; 1984; 1988; 1992; 1996; 2000; 2004; 2008; 2012; 2016; 2020; 2024; 2028

Other related appearances
- 1906 Intercalated Games

Canada competed at the 1996 Summer Olympics in Atlanta, United States, held from 19 July to 4 August 1996. 303 competitors, 152 men and 151 women, took part in 189 events in 25 sports.

== Medallists ==
Medal	Name	Sport	Event	Date
Gold	Donovan Bailey	Athletics	Men's 100 metres	July 27
Gold	Kathleen Heddle; Marnie McBean	Rowing	Women's double sculls	July 27
Gold	Robert Esmie; Glenroy Gilbert; Bruny Surin; Donovan Bailey; Carlton Chambers	Athletics	Men's 4 x 100 metres relay	August 3
Silver	Marianne Limpert	Swimming	Women's 200 metre individual medley	July 24
Silver	Silken Laumann	Rowing	Women's single sculls	July 27
Silver	Derek Porter	Rowing	Men's single sculls	July 27
Silver	Brian Walton	Cycling	Men's points race	July 28
Silver	Lesley Thompson; Tosha Tsang; Anna van der Kamp; Heather McDermid; Jessica Monroe; Emma Robinson; Alison Korn; Theresa Luke; Maria Maunder	Rowing	Women's eight	July 28
Silver	Brian Peaker; Dave Boyes; Gavin Hassett; Jeffrey Lay	Rowing	Men's lightweight coxless four	July 28
Silver	Alison Sydor	Cycling	Women's cross-country	July 30
Silver	Guivi Sissaouri	Wrestling	Men's freestyle 57 kg	July 30
Silver	Lisa Alexander; Janice Bremner; Karen Clark; Karen Fonteyne; Sylvie Fréchette; Valerie Hould-Marchand; Kasia Kulesza; Christine Larsen; Cari Read; Erin Woodley	Synchronized swimming	Women's Team	August 2
Silver	Caroline Brunet	Canoeing	Women's K-1 500 metres	August 4
Silver	David Defiagbon	Boxing	Men's heavyweight	August 4
Bronze	Clara Hughes	Cycling	Women's individual road race	July 21
Bronze	Curtis Myden	Swimming	Men's 400 metre individual medley	July 21
Bronze	Curtis Myden	Swimming	Men's 200 metre individual medley	July 25
Bronze	Laryssa Biesenthal; Kathleen Heddle; Marnie McBean; Diane O'Grady	Rowing	Women's quadruple sculls	July 28
Bronze	John Child; Mark Heese	Volleyball	Men's beach	July 28
Bronze	Curtis Harnett	Cycling	Men's sprint	July 28
Bronze	Annie Pelletier	Diving	Women's 3 metre springboard	July 31
Bronze	Clara Hughes	Cycling	Women's time trial	August 3

== Competitors ==
The following is the list of number of competitors in the Games.

Sport	Men	Women	Total
Archery	3	0	3
Athletics	22	18	40
Badminton	4	3	7
Basketball	0	12	12
Beach volleyball	4	2	6
Boxing	11	–	11
Canoeing	14	7	21
Cycling	9	6	15
Diving	2	4	6
Equestrian	4	7	11
Fencing	7	0	7
Gymnastics	3	4	7
Judo	5	6	11
Rowing	16	16	32
Sailing	11	5	16
Shooting	8	1	9
Softball	–	15	15
Swimming	9	19	28
Synchronized swimming	–	9	9
Table tennis	2	3	5
Tennis	3	3	6
Volleyball	0	12	12
Weightlifting	2	–	2
Wrestling	14	–	14
Total	152	151	305

== Archery ==
Canada sent three men to Atlanta for archery. All were defeated in the first round of individual competition, as well as losing the first match of the team round together.

Men

Athlete	Event	Ranking round		Round of 64	Round of 32	Round of 16	Quarterfinals	Semifinals	Final	
Athlete	Event	Score	Seed	Opposition Score	Opposition Score	Opposition Score	Opposition Score	Opposition Score	Opposition Score	Rank
Jeannot Robitaille	Individual	634	54	Kim Bo-ram (KOR); L 160-168	did not advance					
Rob Rusnov	Individual	645	43	Mikael Larsson (SWE); L 159-167	did not advance					
Kevin Sally	Individual	657	27	Tomi Poikolainen (FIN); L 155-158	did not advance					
Jeannot Robitaille; Rob Rusnov; Kevin Sally	Team	1936	11	—N/a		Ukraine; L 225-238	did not advance			

== Athletics ==
Men
Track and road events

Athlete	Event	Heat		Quarterfinal		Semifinal		Final	
Athlete	Event	Result	Rank	Result	Rank	Result	Rank	Result	Rank
Donovan Bailey	100 m	10.24	10 Q	10.05	5 Q	10.00	3 Q	9.84 WR	1st place, gold medalist(s)
Glenroy Gilbert	100 m	10.34	27 Q	10.28	22	did not advance			
Bruny Surin	100 m	10.18	7 Q	10.13	9 Q	10.13	9	did not advance	
Carlton Chambers	200 m	21.32	65	did not advance					
O'Brian Gibbons	200 m	20.79	34 q	DNS		did not advance			
Peter Ogilvie	200 m	22.00	74	did not advance					
Graham Hood	1500 m	DNF		—N/a		did not advance			
Jeff Schiebler	10,000 m	29:47.79	37	—N/a				did not advance	
Bruce Deacon	Marathon	—N/a						2:19:56	39
Peter Fonseca	Marathon	—N/a						2:17:28	21
Carey Nelson	Marathon	—N/a						2:19:39	35
Tim Kroeker	110 m hurdles	13.74	28 q	14.14	30	did not advance			
Joël Bourgeois	3000 m steeplechase	8:28.14	4 Q	—N/a		8:31.45	16	did not advance	
Robert Esmie; Glenroy Gilbert; Bruny Surin; Donovan Bailey; Carlton Chambers (*)	4 × 100 m relay	38.68	2 Q	—N/a		38.36	2 Q	37.69	1st place, gold medalist(s)
Arturo Huerta	20 km walk	—N/a						1:28:23	41
Martin St. Pierre	20 km walk	—N/a						1:26:37	35
Tim Berrett	50 km walk	—N/a						3:51:28	10

Field events

Athlete	Event	Qualification		Final	
Athlete	Event	Distance	Position	Distance	Position
Charles Lefrançois	High jump	2.26	15	did not advance	
Richard Duncan	Long jump	7.61	34	did not advance	
Brad Snyder	Shot put	17.98	31	did not advance	
Jason Tunks	Discus throw	55.58	33	did not advance	

Combined events – Decathlon

Athlete	Event	100 m	LJ	SP	HJ	400 m	110H	DT	PV	JT	1500 m	Final	Rank
Mike Smith	Result	11.08	7.47	16.97 OB	1.95	51.97	14.78	49.54	5.00	64.34	4:43.81	8271	13
Mike Smith	Points	843	927	911	758	726	876	861	910	803	656	8271	13

Women
Track and road events

Athlete	Event	Heat		Quarterfinal		Semifinal		Final	
Athlete	Event	Result	Rank	Result	Rank	Result	Rank	Result	Rank
Tara Perry	200 m	23.46	33	did not advance					
LaDonna Antoine	400 m	51.99	16 Q	52.03	23	did not advance			
Charmaine Crooks	800 m	2:00.27	18	—N/a		did not advance			
Leah Pells	1500 m	4:13.17	16 q	—N/a		4:06.26	4 Q	4:03.56	4
Paula Schnurr	1500 m	4:29.67	31	—N/a		did not advance			
Kathy Butler	5000 m	15:47.50	23	—N/a				did not advance	
Robyn Meagher	5000 m	16:24.49	42	—N/a				did not advance	
May Allison	Marathon	—N/a						2:44:38	52
Danuta Bartoszek	Marathon	—N/a						2:37:06	32
Katie Anderson	100 m hurdles	12.86	8 Q	13.17	28	did not advance			
Sonia Paquette	100 m hurdles	13.29	33	did not advance					
Lesley Tashlin	100 m hurdles	13.61	37	did not advance					
Rosey Edeh	400 m hurdles	55.64	10 q	—N/a		54.49	7 Q	54.39	6
Katie Anderson; Tara Perry; LaDonna Antoine; Lesley Tashlin	4 × 100 m relay	44.34	12	—N/a				did not advance	
Janice McCaffrey	10 km walk	—N/a						45:47	25
Tina Poitras	10 km walk	—N/a						46:51	32

Field events

Athlete	Event	Qualification		Final	
Athlete	Event	Distance	Position	Distance	Position
Nicole Devonish	Long jump	5.74	34	did not advance	

Combined events – Heptathlon

Athlete	Event	100H	HJ	SP	200 m	LJ	JT	800 m	Final	Rank
Catherine Bond-Mills	Result	13.66	1.83	12.86	24.90	NM	40.56	2:14.50	5235	25
Catherine Bond-Mills	Points	1027	1016	718	896	0	678	900	5235	25

== Badminton ==
Athlete	Event	Round of 64	Round of 32	Round of 16	Quarterfinals	Semifinals	Final / BM
Athlete	Event	Opposition Score	Opposition Score	Opposition Score	Opposition Score	Opposition Score	Rank
Jaimie Dawson	Men's singles	Brandon (SUR); W 15–5, 15-4	Yu (CHN); L 10–15, 11-15	did not advance			
Anil Kaul	Men's singles	Kim (KOR); L w/o	did not advance				
Iain Sydie	Men's singles	Hocking (AUS); W 15–9, 15-9	Wapp (SUI); W 15–7, 15-7	Lee (KOR); L 8–15, 12-15	did not advance		
Anil Kaul; Iain Sydie	Men's doubles	—N/a	Soo / Kim Her (MAS); L 7–15, 3-15	did not advance			
Darryl Yung; Jaimie Dawson	Men's doubles	—N/a	Eriksen / Jakobsen (DEN); L 10–15, 14-17	did not advance			
Denyse Julien	Women's singles	O'Connor (TRI); W 11–3, 11-0	Huang (TPE); L 11–9, 5–11, 1–11	did not advance			
Doris Piché	Women's singles	bye	Susanti (INA); L 1–11, 3–11	did not advance			
Denyse Julien; Si-An Deng	Women's doubles	—N/a	Jenkins / Robertson (NZL); L 7–15, 4-15	did not advance			
Si-An Deng; Anil Kaul	Mixed doubles	—N/a	Sun / Liu (CHN); L 12–15, 3-15	did not advance			
Denyse Julien; Darryl Yung	Mixed doubles	—N/a	Hardy / Stevenson (AUS); W 15–9, 15-3	Peng / Chen (CHN); L 11–15, 6-15	did not advance		
Doris Piché; Iain Sydie	Mixed doubles	—N/a	Ra / Park (KOR); L 3–15, 6-15	did not advance			

== Basketball ==
=== Women's tournament ===
Team roster

- Bev Smith
- Karla Karch-Gailus
- Camille Thompson
- Sue Stewart
- Shawna Molcak
- Jodi Evans
- Cynthia Johnston
- Dianne Norman
- Martina Jerant
- Kelly Boucher
- Andrea Blackwell
- Marlelynn Lange-Harris

Preliminary round

Pos	Team	Pld	W	L	PF	PA	PD	Pts	Qualification
1	Brazil	5	5	0	424	360	+64	10	Quarterfinals
2	Russia	5	4	1	378	342	+36	9	Quarterfinals
3	Italy	5	3	2	330	309	+21	8	Quarterfinals
4	Japan	5	2	3	365	396	−31	7	Quarterfinals
5	China	5	1	4	347	378	−31	6	
6	Canada	5	0	5	293	352	−59	5	

Source: FIBA archive
Rules for classification: 1) points; 2) head-to-head points; 3) head-to-head goal average; 4) head-to-head number of points scored.

21 July 1996

Boxscore

Brazil	69–56	Canada
Pts: Paula, Janeth 17; Rebs: Janeth 8 Asts: Janeth 4		Pts: Blackwell 11; Rebs: Smith 7 Asts: Evans 4

Morehouse College Gymnasium, Atlanta

23 July 1996

Boxscore

Canada	54–59	Italy
Pts: Smith 13; Rebs: Smith 7 Asts: Evans 5		Pts: Fullin, Ballabio 15; Rebs: Pollini, Tufano 4 Asts: Gardellin 3

Morehouse College Gymnasium, Atlanta

25 July 1996

Boxscore

Canada	49–61	China
Pts: three players 8 Rebs: Norman 9 Asts: Evans 5		Pts: Zheng H 19; Rebs: Zheng H 16; Asts: Zheng D 4

Morehouse College Gymnasium, Atlanta

27 July 1996

Boxscore

Russia	68–49	Canada
Pts: Nikonova 18; Rebs: Baranova 11; Asts: Sumnikova 5		Pts: Norman 15; Rebs: Norman 8 Asts: three players 2

Morehouse College Gymnasium, Atlanta

29 July 1996

Boxscore

Canada	85–95	Japan
Pts: Jerant 15; Rebs: Norman 10; Asts: Evans 4		Pts: Hagiwara 26; Rebs: Murakami, Ichijo 5 Asts: Murakami, Kato 5

Morehouse College Gymnasium, Atlanta

Classification match 9th-12th place

31 July 1996
12:00

Boxscore

Canada	79–88	South Korea
Scoring by half: 41–37, 38–51
Pts: Norman 17; Rebs: Norman 8 Asts: Karch-Gailus 8		Pts: Chun J-w 31; Rebs: Jung S-m, Yoo Y-j 4 Asts: Chun J-w 9

Georgia Dome, Atlanta

11th place match

3 August 1996
10:00

Boxscore

Zaire	46–88	Canada
Scoring by half: 20–52, 26–36
Pts: Ngalula 12; Rebs: Tshijuka 9 Asts: Ngalula, Pikinini 2		Pts: Smith 21; Rebs: Norman 10; Asts: Karch-Gailus 6

Georgia Dome, Atlanta

== Boxing ==
Athlete	Event	Round of 32	Round of 16	Quarterfinal	Semifinal	Final
Athlete	Event	Opposition Result	Opposition Result	Opposition Result	Opposition Result	Opposition Result
Domenic Figliomeni	Light flyweight	Mendoza (COL); L 12-1	did not advance			
Claude Lambert	Bantamweight	Khadpo (THA); L 12-2	did not advance			
Casey Patton	Featherweight	N'dou (RSA); L RSC	did not advance			
Mike Strange	Lightweight	Martínez (MEX); W 15–1	Ghazaryan (ARM); W 16–7	Tonchev (BUL); L 16–10	did not advance	
Phillip Boudreault	Light welterweight	Matumla (TAN); W 16–12	Zakharov (RUS); L 11–9	did not advance		
Hercules Kyvelos	Welterweight	Chater (TUN); L 4–4	did not advance			
Nick Farrell	Light middleweight	Ibraimov (KAZ); L 15–4	did not advance			
Randall Thompson	Middleweight	Magee (IRL); L 13–5	did not advance			
Troy Amos-Ross	Light heavyweight	Raforme (SEY); W KO	Mbongo (CMR); W 7–3	Jirov (KAZ); L 14–8	did not advance	
David Defiagbon	Heavyweight	Bye	Ahmed (KEN); W 15–4	Mendy (FRA); W DSQ	Jones (USA); W 16–10	Savón (CUB); L 20–2 (silver)
Jean-François Bergeron	Super heavyweight	Bye	Levin (SWE); L RSC	did not advance		

== Canoeing ==
=== Slalom ===
Athlete	Event	Run 1	Rank	Run 2	Rank	Best	Rank
Larry Norman	Men's C-1	186.57	21	170.12	12	170.12	18
Benoît Gauthier; François Letourneau	Men's C-2	179.83	5	172.67	7	172.67	8
David Ford	Men's K-1	149.23	9	195.83	31	149.23	15
Sheryl Boyle	Women's K-1	242.89	21	244.41	23	242.89	27
Margaret Langford	Women's K-1	193.49	11	173.59	6	173.59	8

=== Sprint ===
Men

Athlete	Event	Heats		Repechage		Semifinals		Final	
Athlete	Event	Time	Rank	Time	Rank	Time	Rank	Time	Rank
Steve Giles	C-1 500 m	1:53.803	3	—N/a		1:51.614	1 Q	1:53.326	8
Gavin Maxwell	C-1 1000 m	4:36.971	6	—N/a		4:27.721	6	did not advance	
Attila Buday; Tamas Buday	C-2 500 m	1:47.551	5	1:49.820	1 Q	1:44.213	6	did not advance	
Steve Giles; Dan Howe	C-2 1000 m	4:33.613	7	—N/a		3:45.077	1 Q	3:46.102	9
Renn Crichlow	K-1 500 m	1:42.652	4	1:43.055	2 Q	1:41.749	6	did not advance	
Erik Gervais	K-1 1000 m	4:01.707	7	4:08.743	6	did not advance			
Mihai Apostol; Peter Giles; Liam Jewell; Renn Crichlow	K-4 1000 m	3:15.208	5	—N/a		3:01.307	2 Q	2:56.664	7

Women

Athlete	Event	Heats		Repechage		Semifinals		Final	
Athlete	Event	Time	Rank	Time	Rank	Time	Rank	Time	Rank
Caroline Brunet	K-1 500 m	1:53.024	2 Q	Bye		1:49.575	2 Q	1:47.891	2nd place, silver medalist(s)
Marie-Josée Gilbeau-Ouimet; Corrina Kennedy	K-2 500 m	1:44.685	3 Q	Bye		1:44.461	4 Q	1:41.313	5
Marie-Josée Gilbeau-Ouimet; Alison Herst; Klara MacAskill; Corrina Kennedy	K-4 500 m	1:39.691	3	—N/a		1:38.712	1 Q	1:33.093	5

== Cycling ==
=== Road ===
Men

Athlete	Event	Time	Rank
Michael Barry	Road race	4:56:47	64
Steve Bauer	Road race	4:56:45	41
Gord Fraser	Road race	4:56:49	75
Jacques Landry	Road race	4:56:51	88
Eric Wohlberg	Road race	4:56:50	80
Eric Wohlberg	Time trial	1:10:36	26

Women

Athlete	Event	Time	Rank
Clara Hughes	Road race	2:36:44	3rd place, bronze medalist(s)
Clara Hughes	Time trial	37:13	3rd place, bronze medalist(s)
Linda Jackson	Road race	DNF	
Linda Jackson	Time trial	38:50	9
Sue Palmer	Road race	2:37:06	10

=== Track ===
Sprints

Athlete	Event	Qualifying		1/32 finals (Repechage)	1/16 finals (Repechage)	1/8 finals (Repechage)	Quarterfinals	Semifinals	Finals (5th-8th)	
Athlete	Event	Time Speed (km/h)	Rank	Opposition Time Speed (km/h)	Opposition Time Speed (km/h)	Opposition Time Speed (km/h)	Opposition Times Speed (km/h)	Opposition Time Speed (km/h)	Opposition Time Speed (km/h)	Rank
Curt Harnett	Men's sprint	10.175; 70.762	2 Q	McKenzie-Potter (NZL); W 11.380; 63.269	Bazálik (SVK); W 11.058; 65.111	Moreno (ESP); W 10.793; 66.710	Magné (FRA); W 2–0	Nothstein (USA); L 2–0	Neiwand (AUS); W 2–0	3rd place, bronze medalist(s)
Tanya Dubnicoff	Women's sprint	11.566; 62.251	8 Q	—N/a		Wang (CHN); W 12.002; 59.990	Haringa (NED); L 2–1	did not advance	Grishina (RUS); Salumäe (EST); Wang (CHN); L 12.416; 57.990	8

Points races

Athlete	Event	Finals	
Athlete	Event	Points	Rank
Brian Walton	Men's points race	29	2nd place, silver medalist(s)

=== Mountain biking ===
Athlete	Event	Time	Rank
Andreas Hestler	Men's cross-country	2:46:45	31
Warren Sallenback	Men's cross-country	2:29:57	13
Alison Sydor	Women's cross-country	1:51:58	2nd place, silver medalist(s)
Lesley Tomlinson	Women's cross-country	2:01:04	13

== Diving ==
Men

Athlete	Event	Preliminaries		Semifinals		Final	
Athlete	Event	Points	Rank	Points	Rank	Points	Rank
David Bédard	3 m springboard	342.33	19	did not advance			
Philippe Comtois	3 m springboard	357.75	14 Q	551.28	16	did not advance	

Women

Athlete	Event	Preliminaries		Semifinals		Final	
Athlete	Event	Points	Rank	Points	Rank	Points	Rank
Eryn Bulmer	3 m springboard	226.74	21	did not advance			
Annie Pelletier	3 m springboard	357.75	14 Q	455.34	12 Q	509.64	3rd place, bronze medalist(s)
Paige Gordon	10 m platform	242.13	21	did not advance			
Anne Montminy	10 m platform	229.34	24	did not advance			

== Equestrian ==
=== Dressage ===
Athlete	Horse	Event	Grand Prix						Total	
Athlete	Horse	Event	Test		Special		Freestyle		Total	
Athlete	Horse	Event	Total	Rank	Total	Rank	Total	Rank	Total	Rank
Leonie Bramall	Gilbona	Individual	64.52	29	did not advance				64.52	29
Gina Smith	Faust	Individual	57.36	46	did not advance				57.36	46
Evi Strasser	Lavinia	Individual	58.48	45	did not advance				58.48	45
Leonie Bramall; Gina Smith; Evi Strasser	See above	Team	—N/a						4,509	10

=== Eventing ===
Athlete	Horse	Event	Dressage		Cross-country			Jumping			Total	
Athlete	Horse	Event	Penalties	Rank	Penalties	Total	Rank	Penalties	Total	Rank	Penalties	Rank
Kelli McMullen-Temple	Amsterdam	Individual	55.20	21	101.60	156.80	18	15.00	15.00	14	171.80	18
Kelli McMullen-Temple	Kilkenny	Team	139.20	4	1935.20	2074.40	14	0.00	0.00	–	2074.40	14
Claire Smith	Gordon Gibbons	Team	139.20	4	1935.20	2074.40	14	0.00	0.00	–	2074.40	14
Therese Washtock	Aristotle	Team	139.20	4	1935.20	2074.40	14	0.00	0.00	–	2074.40	14
Stuart Young-Black	Market Venture	Team	139.20	4	1935.20	2074.40	14	0.00	0.00	–	2074.40	14

=== Jumping ===
Athlete	Horse	Event	Qualification						Final			Total	
Athlete	Horse	Event	Round 1	Round 2		Round 3			Round 1		Jump-off	Total	
Athlete	Horse	Event	Penalties	Penalties	Total	Penalties	Total	Rank	Penalties	Rank	Penalties	Penalties	Rank
Mac Cone	Elute	Individual	8.25	12	20.25	12	32.25	52	did not advance				
Christopher Delia	Silent Sam	Individual	8	16	24	32	56	66	did not advance				
Ian Millar	Play it Again	Individual	8	12	20	8	28	48	did not advance				
Linda Southern-Heathcott	Advantage	Individual	12.75	12	24.75	20.75	45.50	58	did not advance				
Mac Cone; Christopher Delia; Ian Millar; Linda Southern-Heathcott	See above	Team	—N/a	36		40.75	76.75	16	—N/a			76.75	16

== Fencing ==
Seven fencers, all men, represented Canada in 1996.

Athlete	Event	Round of 64	Round of 32	Round of 16	Quarterfinals	Semifinals	Final
Athlete	Event	Opposition Result	Opposition Result	Opposition Result	Opposition Result	Opposition Result	Opposition Result
Jean-Marc Chouinard	Men's individual épée	Bye	Strzalka (GER); L 12–15	did not advance			
Danek Nowosielski	Men's individual épée	Bye	Trevejo (CUB); L 14–15	did not advance			
James Ransom	Men's individual épée	Marx (USA); L 9–15	did not advance				
Jean-Marc Chouinard; Danek Nowosielski; James Ransom	Men's team épée	—N/a		Spain; L 41–45	did not advance		
Jean-Marie Banos	Men's individual sabre	Strzalkowski (USA); W 15–11	Kiriyenko (RUS); L 8–15	did not advance			
Jean-Paul Banos	Men's individual sabre	Lortkipanidze (GEO); W 15–13	Terenzi (ITA); L 7–15	did not advance			
Tony Plourde	Men's individual sabre	Yan (CHN); W 15–9	Navarrete (HUN); L 9–15	did not advance			
Jean-Marie Banos; Jean-Paul Banos; Evens Gravel; Tony Plourde	Men's team sabre	—N/a		Spain; L 25–45	did not advance		

== Gymnastics ==
=== Artistic ===
Athlete	Event	Apparatus								Qualification		Final	
Athlete	Event	Floor	Pommel Horse	Rings	Vault	Parallel Bars	Horizontal Bar	Uneven bars	Balance beam	Total	Rank	Total	Rank
Kris Burley	Men's all-around	18.025	15.600	16.025	19.000	18.375	17.275	N/A		104.300	69	did not advance	
Kris Burley	Floor	18.025	N/A							18.025	81	did not advance	
Kris Burley	Pommel horse	N/A	15.600	N/A						15.600	96	did not advance	
Kris Burley	Rings	N/A		16.025	N/A					16.025	97	did not advance	
Kris Burley	Vault	N/A			19.000	N/A				19.000	40	did not advance	
Kris Burley	Parallel bars	N/A				18.375	N/A			18.375	64	did not advance	
Kris Burley	Horizontal bar	N/A					17.275	N/A		17.275	88	did not advance	
Richard Ikeda	Men's all-around	18.050	18.800	16.250	18.175	17.075	17.050	N/A		105.400	63	did not advance	
Richard Ikeda	Floor	18.050	N/A							18.050	80	did not advance	
Richard Ikeda	Pommel horse	N/A	18.800	N/A						18.800	86	did not advance	
Richard Ikeda	Rings	N/A		16.250	N/A					16.250	96	did not advance	
Richard Ikeda	Vault	N/A			18.175	N/A				18.175	90	did not advance	
Richard Ikeda	Parallel bars	N/A				17.075	N/A			17.075	91	did not advance	
Richard Ikeda	Horizontal bar	N/A					17.050	N/A		17.050	91	did not advance	
Alan Nolet	Men's all-around	18.400	17.950	18.150	18.575	17.875	18.150	N/A		109.100	56	did not advance	
Alan Nolet	Floor	18.400	N/A							18.400	72	did not advance	
Alan Nolet	Pommel horse	N/A	17.950	N/A						17.950	78	did not advance	
Alan Nolet	Rings	N/A		18.150	N/A					18.150	81	did not advance	
Alan Nolet	Vault	N/A			18.575	N/A				18.575	76	did not advance	
Alan Nolet	Parallel bars	N/A				17.875	N/A			17.875	80	did not advance	
Alan Nolet	Horizontal bar	N/A					18.150	N/A		18.150	74	did not advance	
Jennifer Exaltacion	Women's all-around	18.262	N/A		18.462	N/A		18.524	18.474	73.722	54	did not advance	
Jennifer Exaltacion	Floor	18.262	N/A							18.262	82	did not advance	
Jennifer Exaltacion	Vault	N/A			18.462	N/A				18.462	80	did not advance	
Jennifer Exaltacion	Uneven bars	N/A						18.524	N/A	18.524	68	did not advance	
Jennifer Exaltacion	Balance beam	N/A							18.474	18.474	47	did not advance	
Shanyn MacEachern	Women's all-around	18.612	N/A		18.800	N/A		18.824	16.687	72.923	62	did not advance	
Shanyn MacEachern	Floor	18.612	N/A							18.612	67	did not advance	
Shanyn MacEachern	Vault	N/A			18.800	N/A				18.800	52	did not advance	
Shanyn MacEachern	Uneven bars	N/A						18.824	N/A	18.824	55	did not advance	
Shanyn MacEachern	Balance beam	N/A							16.687	16.687	87	did not advance	
Yvonne Tousek	Women's all-around	18.787	N/A		18.750	N/A		18.450	18.787	74.774	39 q	37.793	26
Yvonne Tousek	Floor	18.787	N/A							18.787	56	did not advance	
Yvonne Tousek	Vault	N/A			18.750	N/A				18.750	58	did not advance	
Yvonne Tousek	Uneven bars	N/A						18.450	N/A	18.450	71	did not advance	
Yvonne Tousek	Balance beam	N/A							18.787	18.787	30	did not advance	

=== Rhythmic ===
Individual all-around

Athlete	Event	Qualification						Semifinal						Final					
Athlete	Event	Hoop	Ball	Clubs	Ribbon	Total	Rank	Hoop	Ball	Clubs	Ribbon	Total	Rank	Hoop	Ball	Clubs	Ribbon	Total	Rank
Camille Martens	Individual	9.333	8.599	9.316	9.116	36.364	33	Did not advance											

== Judo ==
Men

Athlete	Event	Round of 64	Round of 32	Round of 16	Quarterfinals	Semifinals	Repechage			Final	
Athlete	Event	Round of 64	Round of 32	Round of 16	Quarterfinals	Semifinals	Round 1	Round 2	Round 3	Final	
Athlete	Event	Opposition Result	Opposition Result	Opposition Result	Opposition Result	Opposition Result	Opposition Result	Opposition Result	Opposition Result	Opposition Result	Rank
Ewan Beaton	–60 kg	Caravana (POR); L	Did not advance								
Taro Tan	–65 kg	Bye	Zhang (CHN); W	Almeida (POR); L	Did not advance						
Colin Morgan	–78 kg	Bye	Liparteliani (GEO); L	Did not advance							
Nicolas Gill	–86 kg	Cano (GUA); W	Ndenguet (CGO); W	Villar (ESP); W	Spittka (GER); L	Did not advance	Bye	Zanol (BRA); W	Huizinga (NED); L	Did not advance	
Keith Morgan	–95 kg	Bye	Gutiérrez (MEX); W	Felicité (MRI); L	Did not advance						

Women

Athlete	Event	Round of 32	Round of 16	Quarterfinals	Semifinals	Repechage			Final	
Athlete	Event	Round of 32	Round of 16	Quarterfinals	Semifinals	Round 1	Round 2	Round 3	Final	
Athlete	Event	Opposition Result	Opposition Result	Opposition Result	Opposition Result	Opposition Result	Opposition Result	Opposition Result	Opposition Result	Rank
Carolyne Lepage	–48 kg	Soler (ESP); L	Did not advance			Heron (GBR); L	Did not advance			
Nathalie Gosselin	–52 kg	Bye	Mariani (ARG); L	Did not advance						
Marie-Josée Morneau	–56 kg	Bye	Mizoguchi (JPN); L	Did not advance						
Michelle Buckingham	–61 kg	Gal (NED); L	Did not advance			Beltrán (CUB); L	Did not advance			
Niki Jenkins	–72 kg	Essombe (FRA); L	Did not advance			Luna (CUB); L	Did not advance			
Nancy Filteau	+72 kg	Bye	Yeh (TPE); W	Rodríguez (CUB); L	Did not advance	Bye	Son (KOR); L	Did not advance		

== Rowing ==
Men

Athlete	Event	Heats		Repechage		Semifinals		Final	
Athlete	Event	Time	Rank	Time	Rank	Time	Rank	Time	Rank
Derek Porter	Single sculls	7:31.75	1 SFA/B	Bye		7:14.91	2 FA	6:47.45	2nd place, silver medalist(s)
Michael Forgeron; Todd Hallett	Double sculls	6:48.03	2 R	6:51.93	1 SFA/B	6:46.35	4 FB	6:18.37	7
Jeff Lay; Dave Boyes; Gavin Hassett; Brian Peaker	Lightweight coxless four	6:18.55	1 SFA/B	Bye		6:10.38	2 FA	6:10.13	2nd place, silver medalist(s)
Greg Stevenson; Phil Graham; Henry Hering; Mark Platt; Darren Barber; Andy Crosby; Scott Brodie; Adam Parfitt; Pat Newman	Eight	5:44.00	2 R	5:30.76	1 FA	—N/a		5:46.54	4

Women

Athlete	Event	Heats		Repechage		Semifinals		Final	
Athlete	Event	Time	Rank	Time	Rank	Time	Rank	Time	Rank
Silken Laumann	Single sculls	8:10.57	2 R	8:28.88	1 SFA/B	7:57.68	1 FA	7:35.15	2nd place, silver medalist(s)
Marnie McBean; Kathleen Heddle	Double sculls	7:23.07	1 SFA/B	Bye		7:11.21	1 FA	6:56.84	1st place, gold medalist(s)
Colleen Miller; Wendy Wiebe	Lightweight double sculls	7:41.20	3 R	7:02.54	2 SFA/B	7:27.19	5 FB	7:03.87	7
Laryssa Biesenthal; Marnie McBean; Diane O'Grady; Kathleen Heddle	Quadruple sculls	6:39.32	1 FA	Bye		—N/a		6:30.38	3rd place, bronze medalist(s)
Emma Robinson; Anna Van der Kamp	Coxless pair	7:38.98	2 SFA/B	Bye		7:32.02	2 FA	7:12.27	5
Heather McDermid; Tosha Tsang; Maria Maunder; Alison Korn; Emma Robinson; Anna Van der Kamp; Jessica Monroe; Theresa Luke; Lesley Thompson-Willie	Eight	6:29.08	2 R	6:06.49	2 FA	—N/a		6:24.05	2nd place, silver medalist(s)

== Sailing ==
Men

Athlete	Event	Race											Net points	Final rank
Athlete	Event	1	2	3	4	5	6	7	8	9	10	11	Net points	Final rank
Alain Bolduc	Mistral One Design	~~38~~	10	18	13	~~22~~	17	8	18	11	—N/a		95	16
Richard Clarke	Finn	14	6	3	10	~~32~~	~~28~~	3	17	21	1	—N/a	75	9
Paul Hannam; Brian Storey	470	10	21	12	23	21	~~29~~	20	~~37~~	13	4	11	135	20

Women

Athlete	Event	Race											Net points	Final rank
Athlete	Event	1	2	3	4	5	6	7	8	9	10	11	Net points	Final rank
Caroll-Ann Alie	Mistral One Design	11	7	7	16	6	10	2	14	28	—N/a		57	12
Tine Moberg-Parker	Europe	4	15	9	3	12	29	17	19	22	8	7	94	13
Leigh Andrew-Pearson; Penny Davis	470	23	1	3	20	6	10	5	8	19	8	16	76	9

Open
Fleet racing

Athlete	Event	Race											Net points	Final rank
Athlete	Event	1	2	3	4	5	6	7	8	9	10	11	Net points	Final rank
Rod Davies	Laser	22	~~57~~	24	25	17	~~28~~	23	25	26	23	9	194	26
Marc Peers; Roy Janse	Tornado	~~17~~	11	9	9	9	12	~~17~~	8	9	8	8	83	11
Ross MacDonald; Eric Jespersen	Star	~~26~~	26	3	18	7	8	11	5	23	7	—N/a	82	14

Match racing

Athlete	Event	Qualification races										Total	Rank	Quarterfinals	Semifinals	Final / BM	Rank
Athlete	Event	1	2	3	4	5	6	7	8	9	10	Total	Rank	Quarterfinals	Semifinals	Final / BM	Rank
Bill Abbott Jr. Joanne Abbott; Brad Boston	Soling	9	~~20~~	~~16~~	10	2	8	1	1	8	8	47	5 Q	Russia; L 0–3	Did not advance		

== Shooting ==
Men

Athlete	Event	Qualification		Final	
Athlete	Event	Points	Rank	Points	Rank
Rod Boll	Double trap	130	19	Did not advance	
Jason Caswell	Skeet	111	53	Did not advance	
Michel Dion	50 metre rifle three positions	1145	43	Did not advance	
Michel Dion	50 metre rifle prone	592	30	Did not advance	
George Leary	Trap	121	8	Did not advance	
Clayton Miller	Skeet	119	20	Did not advance	
Kirk Reynolds	Double trap	135	12	Did not advance	
Jean-François Sénécal	10 metre air rifle	583	30	Did not advance	
Paul Shaw	Trap	115	45	Did not advance	

Women

Athlete	Event	Qualification		Final	
Athlete	Event	Points	Rank	Points	Rank
Cynthia Meyer	Double trap	97	15	Did not advance	

== Softball ==
Summary

Team	Event	Round robin								Semi-final	Bronze medal game	Gold medal game	
Team	Event	Opposition Result	Opposition Result	Opposition Result	Opposition Result	Opposition Result	Opposition Result	Opposition Result	Rank	Opposition Result	Opposition Result	Opposition Result	Rank
Canada women's	Women's tournament	Chinese Taipei; W 2–1	Puerto Rico; W 4–0	China; L 1–2	Japan; L 0–4	United States; L 2–4	Netherlands; W 4–1	Australia; L 2–5	5	Did not advance			

Team roster

- Colleen Thorburn-Smith
- Sandy Beasley
- Juanita Clayton
- Karen Doell
- Carrie Flemmer
- Kelly Kelland
- Kara McGaw
- Pauline Maurice
- Candace Murray
- Christine Parris
- Lori Sippel
- Karen Snelgrove
- Debbie Sonnenberg
- Alecia Stephenson
- Carmie Vairo
- Head coach: Lesle Kennedy

Group play

Team	W	L	RS	RA	WIN%	GB	Tiebreaker
United States	6	1	37	7	.857	-	-
China	5	2	29	9	.714	1	3 RA vs. AUS/JPN
Australia	5	2	22	11	.714	1	6 RA vs. CHN/JPN
Japan	5	2	24	18	.714	1	10 RA vs. CHN/AUS
Canada	3	4	15	17	.429	3	-
Chinese Taipei	2	5	19	19	.286	4	-
Netherlands	1	6	4	32	.143	5	1–0 vs. PUR
Puerto Rico	1	6	5	44	.143	5	0–1 vs. NED

Team	1	2	3	4	5	6	7	8	9	10	R	H	E
Chinese Taipei	0	1	0	0	0	0	0	0	0	0	1	5	1
Canada	0	0	0	0	0	0	1	0	0	1	2	8	3
WP: Sippel (1–0) LP: Tu HP (0–1)

Team	1	2	3	4	5	6	7	R	H	E
Puerto Rico	0	0	0	0	0	0	0	0	2	1
Canada	0	0	0	0	0	4	–	4	4	0
WP: Snelgrove (1–0) LP: Echevarría (0–1)

Team	1	2	3	4	5	6	7	R	H	E
China	2	0	0	0	0	0	0	2	5	1
Canada	0	0	1	0	0	0	0	1	5	2
WP: Wang L (2–1) LP: Sippel (1–1)

Team	1	2	3	4	5	6	7	R	H	E
Canada	0	0	0	0	0	0	0	0	5	0
Japan	1	0	0	3	0	0	–	4	9	1
WP: Takayama (2–0) LP: Sonnenberg (0–1)

Team	1	2	3	4	5	6	7	R	H	E
United States	0	0	0	1	1	0	2	4	4	1
Canada	0	0	0	0	2	0	0	2	6	5
WP: Williams (2–0) LP: Snelgrove (1–1)

Team	1	2	3	4	5	6	7	R	H	E
Netherlands	0	1	0	0	0	0	0	1	2	4
Canada	0	0	2	1	0	1	–	4	5	1
WP: Sippel (2–1) LP: Mels (0–4) Sv: Debbie Sonnenberg (1)

Team	1	2	3	4	5	6	7	R	H	E
Canada	0	0	0	2	0	0	0	2	4	0
Australia	2	0	0	0	3	0	–	5	9	3
WP: Roche (2–1) LP: Snelgrove (1–2)

== Swimming ==
Men

Athlete	Event	Heats		Final A/B	
Athlete	Event	Time	Rank	Time	Rank
Casey Barrett	200 m butterfly	2:00.28	13 FB	1:59.72	11
Rob Braknis	100 m backstroke	56.14	10 FB	57.00	16
Stephen Clarke	100 m freestyle	50.14	11 FB	50.45	15
Stephen Clarke	100 m butterfly	53.41	5 FA	53.33	7
Jon Cleveland	100 m breaststroke	1:03.14	23	Did not advance	
Jon Cleveland	200 m breaststroke	2:16.08	14 FB	2:16.39	15
Hugues Legault	50 m freestyle	23.63	39	Did not advance	
Curtis Myden	200 m individual medley	2:01.50	4 FA	2:01.13	3rd place, bronze medalist(s)
Curtis Myden	400 m individual medley	4:18.43	5 FA	4:16.28	3rd place, bronze medalist(s)
Edward Parenti	100 m butterfly	54.03	16 FB	54.19	15
Chris Renaud	100 m backstroke	56.52	18	Did not advance	
Chris Renaud	200 m backstroke	2:02.48	16 FB	2:01.70	10
Rob Braknis; Stephen Clarke; Jon Cleveland; Edward Parenti	4 × 100 m medley relay	3:42.95	12	Did not advance	

Women

Athlete	Event	Heats		Final A/B	
Athlete	Event	Time	Rank	Time	Rank
Jessica Amey	100 m butterfly	1:02.81	25	Did not advance	
Guylaine Cloutier	100 m breaststroke	1:09.72	6 FA	1:09.40	6
Jessica Deglau	200 m butterfly	2:12.48	5 FA	2:11.40	6
Martine Dessureault	50 m freestyle	26.44	26	Did not advance	
Nikki Dryden	800 m freestyle	8:47.19	14	Did not advance	
Sarah Evanetz	100 m butterfly	1:01.32	13 FB	1:01.44	15
Lisa Flood	100 m breaststroke	1:10.26	12 FB	1:10.21	10
Julie Howard	100 m backstroke	1:03.84	15 FB	1:04.01	15
Julie Howard	200 m backstroke	2:17.25	20	Did not advance	
Marianne Limpert	200 m individual medley	2:15.12	1 FA	2:14.35	2nd place, silver medalist(s)
Joanne Malar	200 m freestyle	2:03.53	17 FB	2:03.79	16
Joanne Malar	200 m individual medley	2:16.34	6 FA	2:15.30	4
Joanne Malar	400 m individual medley	4:47.85	9 FB	4:46.34	9
Riley Mants	200 m breaststroke	2:32.97	19	Did not advance	
Laura Nicholls	50 m freestyle	26.52	29	Did not advance	
Christin Petelski	200 m breaststroke	2:30.30	8 FA	2:31.45	8
Stephanie Richardson	800 m freestyle	8:52.61	19	Did not advance	
Andrea Schwartz	400 m freestyle	4:19.46	20	Did not advance	
Andrea Schwartz	200 m butterfly	2:13.33	9 FB	2:14.07	15
Shannon Shakespeare	100 m freestyle	56.63	17	Did not advance	
Nancy Sweetnam	400 m individual medley	4:48.56	11 FB	4:47.55	11
Shannon Shakespeare; Julie Howard; Andrea Moody; Marianne Limpert	4 × 100 m freestyle relay	3:45.66	6 FA	3:46.27	7
Marianne Limpert; Shannon Shakespeare; Andrea Schwartz; Jessica Deglau; Joanne Malar (heats only); Sophie Simard (heats only)	4 × 200 m freestyle relay	8:12.03	6 FA	8:08.16	5
Julie Howard; Guylaine Cloutier; Sarah Evanetz; Shannon Shakespeare	4 × 100 m medley relay	4:09.50	6 FA	4:08.29	5

== Synchronized swimming ==
Athlete	Event	Technical routine		Free routine		Total	
Athlete	Event	Points	Rank	Points	Rank	Points	Rank
Christine Larsen; Karen Clark; Sylvie Fréchette; Janice Bremner; Karen Fonteyne; Valérie Hould-Marchand; Erin Woodley; Cari Read; Lisa Alexander	Team	97.933	2	98.600	2	98.367	2nd place, silver medalist(s)

== Table tennis ==
Men

Athlete	Event	Group Stage				Round of 16	Quarterfinal	Semifinal	Final	
Athlete	Event	Opposition Result	Opposition Result	Opposition Result	Rank	Opposition Result	Opposition Result	Opposition Result	Opposition Result	Rank
Johnny Huang	Singles	Olaleye (NGR); W 2–0	Zhuang (USA); W 2–0	Chen (GBR); W 2–0	1 Q	Waldner (SWE); W 3–1	Liu (CHN); L 1–3	Did not advance		
Joe Ng	Singles	Matsushita (JPN); L 0–2	Grubba (POL); L 0–2	Suseno (INA); L 0–2	4	Did not advance				
Johnny Huang; Joe Ng	Doubles	Jindrak / Schlager (AUT); L 0–2	Roßkopf / Fetzner (GER); L 0–2	Peixoto / Hoyama (BRA); W 2–0	3	—N/a	Did not advance			

Women

Athlete	Event	Group Stage				Round of 16	Quarterfinal	Semifinal	Final	
Athlete	Event	Opposition Result	Opposition Result	Opposition Result	Rank	Opposition Result	Opposition Result	Opposition Result	Opposition Result	Rank
Petra Cada	Singles	Jing (SGP); L 0–2	Kim (PRK); L 0–2	Xu (TPE); L 0–2	4	Did not advance				
Lijuan Geng	Singles	Keen (NED); W 2–0	Park (KOR); W 2–0	—N/a	1 Q	Chan (HKG); L 1–3	Did not advance			
Barbara Chiu; Lijuan Geng	Doubles	Coubat / Wang-Dréchou (FRA); L 0–2	Deng / Qiao (CHN); L 0–2	—N/a	3	—N/a	Did not advance			

== Tennis ==
Men

Athlete	Event	Round of 64	Round of 32	Round of 16	Quarterfinals	Semifinals	Final	
Athlete	Event	Opposition Result	Opposition Result	Opposition Result	Opposition Result	Opposition Result	Opposition Result	Rank
Sébastien Lareau	Singles	Costa (ESP); L 6^{11}–7, 4–6						
Daniel Nestor	Singles	Sargsian (ARM); L 4–6, 4–6	Did not advance					
Grant Connell; Daniel Nestor	Doubles	—N/a	Barron / Casey (IRL); W 6–4, 6–4	Broad / Henman (GBR); L 6^{5}–7, 6–4, 4–6	Did not advance			

Women

Athlete	Event	Round of 64	Round of 32	Round of 16	Quarterfinals	Semifinals	Final	
Athlete	Event	Opposition Result	Opposition Result	Opposition Result	Opposition Result	Opposition Result	Opposition Result	Rank
Patricia Hy-Boulais	Singles	Grande (ITA); W 6–4, 6–4	Seles (USA); L 3–6, 2–6	Did not advance				
Jana Nejedly	Singles	Zrubáková (SVK); L 3–6, 2–6	Did not advance					
Jill Hetherington; Patricia Hy-Boulais	Doubles	—N/a	Nagatsuka / Sugiyama (JPN); W 7–6^{2}, 6–1	Barabanschikova / Zvereva (BLR); W 2–6, 6–4, 6–1	Novotná / Suková (CZE); L 2–6, 4–6	Did not advance		

== Volleyball ==
=== Beach ===
Athlete	Event	First round	Second round	Third round	Fourth round	Elimination					Semifinal	Final / BM	
Athlete	Event	Opposition Result	Opposition Result	Opposition Result	Opposition Result	Opposition Result	Opposition Result	Opposition Result	Opposition Result	Opposition Result	Opposition Result	Opposition Result	Rank
John Child; Mark Heese	Men's	Bye	Bosma / Jiménez (ESP); L 1–15	Did not advance		Englén / Peterson (SWE); W 15–2	Palinek / Pakosta (CZE); W 15–9	Ahmann / Hager (GER); W 15–7	Álvarez / Rossell (CUB); W 15–4	Bosma / Jiménez (ESP); W 15–4	Kiraly / Steffes (USA); L 11–15	Maia / Brenha (POR); W 12–5, 12–8	3rd place, bronze medalist(s)
Edward Drakich; Mark Dunn	Men's	Prosser / Zahner (AUS); L 6–15	Did not advance			Ghiurghi / Grigolo (ITA); L 8–15	Did not advance						
Margo Malowney; Barb Broen-Ouelette	Women's	Yudhani Rahayu / Kaize (INA); L 10–15	Did not advance			Prawerman / Lesage (FRA); L 13–15	Did not advance						

=== Indoor ===
Summary

Team	Event	Group stage						Quarterfinal	Semifinal	Final / BM	
Team	Event	Opposition Score	Opposition Score	Opposition Score	Opposition Score	Opposition Score	Rank	Opposition Score	Opposition Score	Opposition Score	Rank
Canada women's	Women's tournament	Cuba; L 0–3	Russia; L 0–3	Germany; L 0–3	Brazil; L 0–3	Peru; W 3–2	5	Did not advance			

Team roster

- Kerri Buchberger
- Josee Corbeil
- Wanda Guenette
- Janis Kelly
- Lori Ann Mundt
- Diane Ratnik
- Erminia Russo
- Michelle Sawatzky
- Brigitte Soucy
- Christine Stark
- Kathy Tough
- Katrina Von Sass
- Head coach: Mike Burchuk

Group stage

Pos	Team	Pld	W	L	Pts	SW	SL	SR	SPW	SPL	SPR	Qualification
1	Brazil	5	5	0	10	15	1	15.000	238	121	1.967	Quarterfinals
2	Russia	5	4	1	9	12	4	3.000	217	140	1.550	Quarterfinals
3	Cuba	5	3	2	8	10	6	1.667	196	156	1.256	Quarterfinals
4	Germany	5	2	3	7	7	9	0.778	163	191	0.853	Quarterfinals
5	Canada	5	1	4	6	3	14	0.214	156	239	0.653	
6	Peru	5	0	5	5	2	15	0.133	129	252	0.512	

Date		Score		Set 1	Set 2	Set 3	Set 4	Set 5	Total	Report
20 Jul	Canada	0–3	Cuba	8–15	8–15	5–15			21–45	Report
22 Jul	Russia	3–0	Canada	15–1	15–7	15–9			45–17	Report
24 Jul	Canada	0–3	Germany	5–15	12–15	6–15			23–45	Report
26 Jul	Canada	0–3	Brazil	6–15	6–15	11–15			23–45	Report
28 Jul	Peru	2–3	Canada	17–16	6–15	15–11	9–15	12–15	59–72	Report

== Weightlifting ==
Athlete	Event	Snatch		Clean & jerk		Total	Rank
Athlete	Event	Result	Rank	Result	Rank	Total	Rank
Jean Lavertue	–64 kg	125.0	19	145.0	29	270.0	28
Serge Tremblay	–83 kg	150.0	12	177.5	13	327.5	13

== Wrestling ==
Greco-Roman

Athlete	Event	Round of 32	Round of 16	Quarterfinals	Semifinals	Repechage					Final	
Athlete	Event	Round of 32	Round of 16	Quarterfinals	Semifinals	Round 1	Round 2	Round 3	Round 4	Round 5	Final	
Athlete	Event	Opposition Result	Opposition Result	Opposition Result	Opposition Result	Opposition Result	Opposition Result	Opposition Result	Opposition Result	Opposition Result	Opposition Result	Rank
Ainsley Robinson	–62 kg	Zuniga (USA); L 2–3	Did not advance			Choi (KOR); L 0–7	Did not advance					
Colin Daynes	–68 kg	Pulyaev (UZB); L 0–12	Did not advance			Kandafil (MAR); W 5–4	Manukyan (ARM); L 3–9	Did not advance				
Doug Cox	–90 kg	Kasum (YUG); L 0–3	Did not advance			Hodžić (BIH); L 2–5	Did not advance					
Colbie Bell	–100 kg	Milián (CUB); L 0–12	Did not advance			Gogitidze (GEO); L 0–3	Did not advance					
Yogi Johl	–130 kg	Hallik (EST); L 0–0	Did not advance			Amariei (ROU); W 3–1	Dgvareli (TJK); L 0–2	Did not advance				

Freestyle

Athlete	Event	Round of 32	Round of 16	Quarterfinals	Semifinals	Repechage					Final	
Athlete	Event	Round of 32	Round of 16	Quarterfinals	Semifinals	Round 1	Round 2	Round 3	Round 4	Round 5	Final	
Athlete	Event	Opposition Result	Opposition Result	Opposition Result	Opposition Result	Opposition Result	Opposition Result	Opposition Result	Opposition Result	Opposition Result	Opposition Result	Rank
Paul Ragusa	–48 kg	Sergelenbaatar (MGL); L 1–7	Did not advance			Orujov (RUS); L 0–12	Did not advance					
Greg Woodcroft	–52 kg	Mamyrov (KAZ); L 0–10	Did not advance			Fitzgerald (AUS); W Fall	Kollar (SVK); W 6–3	Rosselli (USA); W w/o	Topaktaş (TUR); L 1–13	Did not advance	Achilov (UZB); L 0–11	8
Guivi Sissaouri	–57 kg	Tsogtbayar (MGL); W 8–3	Umakhanov (RUS); W 1–1	Zakhartdinov (UZB); W 8–0	Trstena (MKD); W 4–1	—N/a					Cross (USA); L 3–5	2nd place, silver medalist(s)
Marty Calder	–62 kg	Scheibe (GER); L 2–4	Did not advance			Müller (SUI); W 6–0	Nieves (PUR); W 3–0	Parsekian (CYP); W 10–4	Wada (JPN); L 3–7	Did not advance	Islamov (UZB); W 9–1	7
Craig Roberts	–68 kg	Weiss (AUS); W 12–2	Saunders (USA); L 1–3	Did not advance		—N/a	Gogol (BLR); L 0–4	Did not advance				
David Hohl	–74 kg	Budayev (UZB); L 3–4	Did not advance			Ozoline (AUS); W 11–5	Avom Mbume (CMR); W 10–0	Leipold (GER); L 2–10	Did not advance			
Scott Bianco	–90 kg	Bayramukov (KAZ); L 2–5	Did not advance			Kostecki (POL); W 3–2	Kodei (NGR); L 0–7	Did not advance				
Oleg Ladik	–100 kg	Troplini (ALB); W Fall	Garmulewicz (POL); L 0–3	Did not advance		—N/a	Khabelov (RUS); W w/o	Murtazaliev (UKR); L 1–4	Did not advance		Murtazaliev (UKR); L 1–3	8
Andy Borodow	–130 kg	Baumgartner (USA); L 0–10	Did not advance			Klimov (KAZ); W 5–3	Bourdoulis (GRE); L 0–1	Did not advance				
