= Cayman Islands at the 1996 Summer Olympics =

- Flag of the Cayman Islands
- IOC code: CAY
- NOC: Cayman Islands Olympic Committee
- Website: www.caymanolympic.org.ky

in Atlanta
- Competitors: 9 (8 men and 1 woman) in 3 sports
- Flag bearer: Carson Ebanks
- Medals: Gold 0 Silver 0 Bronze 0 Total 0

Summer Olympics appearances (overview)
- 1976; 1980; 1984; 1988; 1992; 1996; 2000; 2004; 2008; 2012; 2016; 2020; 2024

The Cayman Islands competed at the 1996 Summer Olympics in Atlanta, United States.

== Competitors ==
The following is the list of number of competitors in the Games.

Sport	Men	Women	Total
Athletics	0	1	1
Cycling	1	0	1
Sailing	7	0	7
Total	8	1	9

== Athletics ==
Women
Track and road events

Athlete	Event	Heats		Quarterfinal		Semifinal		Final	
Athlete	Event	Result	Rank	Result	Rank	Result	Rank	Result	Rank
Cydonie Mothersille	100 metres	11.61	36	Did not advance					

== Cycling ==
=== Road ===
Men

Athlete	Event	Time	Rank
Stefan Baraud	Road race	DNF	

== Sailing ==
Men

Athlete	Event	Race										Net points	Final rank
Athlete	Event	1	2	3	4	5	6	7	8	9	10	Net points	Final rank
David Grogono	Mistral One Design	~~42~~	~~43~~	42	34	39	37	34	40	38	—N/a	264	43
Mark Clarke	Finn	~~28~~	27	28	26	25	18	28	~~32~~	23	27	202	29

Open
Fleet racing

Athlete	Event	Race											Net points	Final rank
Athlete	Event	1	2	3	4	5	6	7	8	9	10	11	Net points	Final rank
John van Batenburg Stafford	Laser	37	29	44	27	34	38	41	36	~~52~~	~~45~~	32	318	39
Alun Davies; Michael Joseph	Tornado	~~19~~	18	17	19	19	18	19	19	~~20~~	19	16	164	19
Donald McLean; Carson Ebanks	Star	~~24~~	22	24	23	24	23	~~26~~	24	24	23	—N/a	187	25
