= Vairo =

Vairo is an Italian surname originating from the identical forename. Notable people with the surname include:

- Carmie Vairo (born 1968), Canadian softball player
- Dominic Vairo (1913–2002), American football player
- Federico Vairo (1930–2010), Argentine footballer
- Juan Vairo (born 1932), Argentine footballer
- Lou Vairo (born 1945), American ice hockey coach
- Mat Vairo, American actor
- Virginio Vairo, Italian automobile designer
