= Myasnikov =

Myasnikov or Miasnikov (Russian: Мясников) is a Russian surname associated with the Russian noble Myasnikov family. It derives from the Russian word myasnik (мясник, 'butcher'). It may also be a Russification of the Armenian surname Miasnikian, from the Armenian male name derived from the Persian name Misagh (romanized as Mithaq). Notable people with the surname include:

- Alexander Miasnikian, commonly known as Aleksandr Myasnikov (1886–1925), Soviet Armenian Bolshevik
- Aleksandr Myasnikov, Russian field hockey player
- Ekaterina Kozitskaya, née Myasnikova, (1746–1833) Russian industrialist
- Gavril Myasnikov (1889–1945), Russian revolutionary
- Gennady Myasnikov (1919–1989), Soviet production designer
- Georg Myasnikov (1926–1996), Soviet CPSU, state and public figure, historian, and local history specialist
- Karina Myasnikova, Russian artistic gymnast
- Lidia Myasnikova (1911–2005), Soviet singer and music educator
- Sergey Myasnikov (born 1967), Russian sailor
- Varvara Myasnikova (1900–1978), Soviet actress
- Sergey Myasnikov (born 1967), Russian sailor
- Viktor Myasnikov (born 1948), retired hurdler
- Veniamin Myasnikov (1936–2004), Soviet mathematician, mechanician
- Yulia Myasnikova, Kazakhstani women's soccer player
