= Michael Joseph =

Michael Joseph may refer to:

- Michael An Gof (Michael Joseph, died 1497), Cornish rebel
- Michael Joseph (publisher) (1897–1958), British publisher and writer
- M. K. Joseph (Michael Kennedy Joseph, 1914–1981), New Zealand novelist
- Michael Joseph (businessman), Kenyan-American business executive
- Michael Joseph (Belizean sprinter) (born 1971), Belizean sprinter
- Michael Joseph (sailor) (born 1973), Caymanian sailor
- Michael Joseph (photographer), American portrait photographer
- Michael Joseph (politician) (born 1988), Antiguan senator
- Michael Joseph (American football) (born 1995), American football player
- Michael Joseph (Saint Lucian sprinter) (born 2002), Saint Lucian sprinter

== See also ==
- Michael Josephs (disambiguation)
