= Mark Clarke =

Mark Clarke is the name of:

- Mark Clarke (musician) (born 1950), English musician
- Mark Clarke (sailor) (1950–2013), Caymanian sailor
- Mark Clarke (politician) (born 1977), British politician

== See also ==
- Mark Clark (disambiguation)
