= Rochester Museum =

Rochester Museum may refer to the following:

- Rochester Museum and Science Center (founded 1912), in Rochester, New York
- Rochester Museum of Fine Arts (founded 2011), in Rochester, New Hampshire

== See also ==
- Rochester & Genesee Valley Railroad Museum in Industry, New York
- Category:Museums in Rochester, New York
