= Cristian Ruata =

Guatemalan windsurfer

Personal information
- Nationality: Guatemalan
- Born: 26 January 1972 (age 53)

Sport
- Country: Guatemala
- Sport: Windsurfing

Cristian Ruata (born 26 January 1972) is a Guatemalan windsurfer. He competed in the men's Mistral One Design event at the 1996 Summer Olympics.
