= Lidia Myasnikova =

Soviet singer and music educator (1911–2005)

Lidia Vladimirovna Myasnikova (Russian: Лидия Владимировна Мясникова; 1911–2005) was a Soviet and Russian mezzo-soprano opera singer, People's Artist of the USSR (1960).

== Biography ==
Myasnikova was born on September 8, 1911 (according to the Julian calendar) in Tomsk.

In 1939, she graduated from the Leningrad Conservatory (M. I. Brian's class). In 1941, the singer completed her postgraduate studies.

In 1944, Myasnikova moved to Novosibirsk. From 1945 to 1982, she was a soloist of the Novosibirsk Opera and Ballet Theatre. In 1968–1994, she taught at the Novosibirsk Conservatory (since 1981, professor at the institution).

She toured Soviet Union and Czechoslovakia. The singer died on January 14, 2005, in Novosibirsk and was buried in the columbarium of Novosibirsk Crematorium.

== Some roles ==
- Carmen – Carmen by Georges Bizet (debut performance)
- Azucena – Il trovatore by Giuseppe Verdi
- Amneris – Aida by Giuseppe Verdi
- Marfa – Khovanshchina by Modest Mussorgsky
- Polina – The Queen of Spades by Pyotr Tchaikovsky
- Lyubov – Mazeppa by Pyotr Tchaikovsky
- Solokha – Cherevichki by Pyotr Tchaikovsky
- Gertrude – Bánk bán by Ferenc Erkel
- Дьячиха – Jenůfa by Leoš Janáček (the first performance on the Russian stage)

== Memory ==
One of the streets of Rodniki Microdistrict is named after her. In 2008, the 1st Interregional Competition of Vokalists named after L. V. Myasnikova was held in Novosibirsk.
