= Patrick Thorens =

Swiss sailor

Personal information
- Nationality: Swiss
- Born: 9 April 1969 (age 55)

Sport
- Sport: Sailing

Patrick Thorens (born 9 April 1969) is a Swiss sailor. He competed in the Tornado event at the 1996 Summer Olympics.
