= Matthias Bornhäuser =

German windsurfer

Personal information
- Nationality: German
- Born: 5 January 1974 (age 51); Reutlingen, West Germany

Sport
- Sport: Windsurfing

Matthias Bornhäuser (also spelled Bornhaeuser, born 5 January 1974) is a German former windsurfer. He competed in the men's Mistral One Design event at the 1996 Summer Olympics.
