= Márcia Pellicano =

Brazilian sailor (born 1970)

Personal information
- Born: 1 July 1970 (age 55) Rio de Janeiro, Brazil

Sport
- Sport: Sailing
Medal record
Sailing
Representing Brazil
Pan American Games
Gold medal – first place	1995 Mar del Plata	Europe

Márcia Pellicano (born 1 July 1970) is a Brazilian sailor. She competed at the 1988 Summer Olympics in the women's 470, and both the 1992 Summer Olympics and the 1996 Summer Olympics in the Europe class. She is the older sister of fellow sailor Kiko Pellicano.
