= Mark Clark =

Mark Clark may refer to:

- Mark A. Clark (politician) (born 1967), Arizona state legislator
- Mark A. Clark (general), U.S. Marine Corps general in charge of their Special Operations Command
- Mark W. Clark (1896–1984), U.S. Army general during World War II and Korean War
- Mark Clark (baseball) (born 1968), Major League Baseball player
- Mark Clark (activist) (1947–1969), killed with Fred Hampton in an infamous Chicago police raid in 1969

== See also ==
- Mark Clarke (disambiguation)
