= Andrés Isola =

Uruguayan windsurfer

Personal information
- Nationality: Uruguayan
- Born: 20 December 1974 (age 50)

Sport
- Sport: Windsurfing

Andrés Isola (born 20 December 1974) is a Uruguayan windsurfer. He competed in the men's Mistral One Design event at the 1996 Summer Olympics.
