= Michael Joseph (photographer) =

American portrait photographer

Michael Joseph is an American portrait photographer, living in Boston, Massachusetts. His series Lost and Found was exhibited at Rochester Museum of Fine Arts in 2022 and published as a book by Kehrer in 2023.

== Education ==
Joseph graduated with a degree in communication from the University of Pennsylvania, Philadelphia, in 1999.

== Life and work ==
Lost and Found documents a contemporary American subculture of young travellers through portraiture and stories. Its cast of characters travel the country by hitchhiking and freight train hopping. The black and white portraits, made over more than 10 years, are taken on the street using natural light.

The Wild West of the East is a series of Polaroid portraits of people in the LGBTQ+ vacation destination of Provincetown, Massachusetts.

As of 2019, Joseph was living in Boston, Massachusetts.

== Awards ==
- 2015: Photography Fellow by Massachusetts Cultural Council
- 2017: Peter S. Reed Grant by Peter S. Reed Foundation
- 2021: Michael Joseph – Winner AAP Magazine 17 Portrait.

== Publications ==
=== Books by Joseph ===
- Lost & Found: a Portrait of American Wanderlust. Heidelberg, Germany: Kehrer, 2023. ISBN 978-3-96900-138-7.

=== Books with contributions by Joseph ===
- Boys! Boys! Boys! The Book. Heidelberg, Germany: Kehrer, 2023. Edited by Ghislain Pascal.

== Solo exhibitions ==
- Lost and Found, Rochester Museum of Fine Arts, Rochester, New York, March–April, 2022
