= Brendan Todd =

Australian windsurfer

Personal information
- Nationality: Australian
- Born: 5 August 1973 (age 52) Blacktown, New South Wales
- Height: 186 cm (6 ft 1 in)
- Weight: 71 kg (157 lb)

Sailing career
- Sport: Sailing
- Club: Canberra Sailors Club
- Class(es): Mistral, RS:X

Brendan Todd (born 5 August 1973) is an Australian windsurfer. He competed in the men's Mistral One Design event at the 1996 Summer Olympics.
