= Howard Plumb =

British windsurfer (1971-2014)

Personal information
- Full name: Howard Richard Plumb
- Born: 28 August 1971 Chichester, West Sussex, England
- Died: 7 July 2014 (aged 42) London, England

Sport
- Sport: Windsurfing
- Event: Mistral One Design Class

Howard Richard Plumb (28 August 1971 – 7 July 2014) was a British windsurfer. He competed in the Mistral One Design at the 1996 Summer Olympics.

Outside his sport, Plumb graduated with a degree in mechanical engineering from Portsmouth University and was employed in the biotechnology industry until his death.

On 5 July 2014, Plumb sustained head injuries after colliding with a car whilst he was cycling in Knight's Hill, Charlton. Plumb was airlifted to London's St George's Hospital in Tooting; however he later died on 7 July 2014 as the result of the injuries sustained. The driver of the car which struck Plumb later pleaded guilty to a charge of causing death by careless driving.
