= Sailing at the 1996 Summer Olympics – Men's Mistral One Design =

Mistral One Design Men's at the Games of the XXVI Olympiad
- Mistral One Design
- Venue: Savannah
- Dates: 22 July to 2 August
- Competitors: 46 from 46 nations
- Teams: 46

Medalists
1st place, gold medalist(s)		Nikolaos Kaklamanakis	Greece
2nd place, silver medalist(s)		Carlos Mauricio Espinola	Argentina
3rd place, bronze medalist(s)		Gal Fridman	Israel

The Men's Sailboard (Mistral One Design) Competition at the 1996 Summer Olympics was held from 22 July to 2 August 1996 in Savannah, Georgia, United States. Points were awarded for placement in each race. Eleven races were scheduled. Nine races were sailed. Each sailor had two discards.

== Results ==
Rank	Helmsman (Country)	Race I		Race II		Race III		Race IV		Race V		Race VI		Race VII		Race VIII		Race IX		Total Points	Total -1
Rank	Helmsman (Country)	Rank	Points	Rank	Points	Rank	Points	Rank	Points	Rank	Points	Rank	Points	Rank	Points	Rank	Points	Rank	Points	Total Points	Total -1
1st place, gold medalist(s)	Nikolaos Kaklamanakis (GRE)	5	5.0	1	1.0	2	2.0	6	6.0	1	1.0	~~9~~	~~9.0~~	1	1.0	1	1.0	~~DNF~~	~~47.0~~	73.0	17.0
2nd place, silver medalist(s)	Carlos Espinola (ARG)	2	2.0	4	4.0	4	4.0	2	2.0	3	3.0	~~6~~	~~6.0~~	~~PMS~~	~~47.0~~	2	2.0	2	2.0	72.0	19.0
3rd place, bronze medalist(s)	Gal Fridman (ISR)	1	1.0	6	6.0	5	5.0	3	3.0	~~10~~	~~10.0~~	1	1.0	~~9~~	~~9.0~~	4	4.0	1	1.0	40.0	21.0
4	Aaron McIntosh (NZL)	4	4.0	3	3.0	1	1.0	~~18~~	~~18.0~~	~~15~~	~~15.0~~	2	2.0	5	5.0	3	3.0	9	9.0	60.0	27.0
5	Jean-Max de Chavigny (FRA)	7	7.0	5	5.0	~~10~~	~~10.0~~	1	1.0	~~14~~	~~14.0~~	5	5.0	2	2.0	7	7.0	10	10.0	61.0	37.0
6	Mike Gebhardt (USA)	10	10.0	~~16~~	~~16.0~~	3	3.0	4	4.0	5	5.0	~~23~~	~~23.0~~	4	4.0	11	11.0	4	4.0	80.0	41.0
7	João Rodrigues (POR)	~~14~~	~~14.0~~	8	8.0	9	9.0	5	5.0	2	2.0	4	4.0	6	6.0	~~12~~	~~12.0~~	8	8.0	68.0	42.0
8	Brendan Todd (AUS)	~~11~~	~~11.0~~	2	2.0	8	8.0	7	7.0	9	9.0	10	10.0	3	3.0	9	9.0	~~20~~	~~20.0~~	79.0	48.0
9	Ted Huang (TPE)	6	6.0	~~15~~	~~15.0~~	16	16.0	8	8.0	4	4.0	12	12.0	~~13~~	~~13.0~~	10	10.0	6	6.0	90.0	59.0
10	Matthias Bornhäuser (GER)	3	3.0	11	11.0	13	13.0	~~27~~	~~27.0~~	~~PMS~~	~~47.0~~	15	15.0	7	7.0	8	8.0	3	3.0	134.0	60.0
11	Mirosław Małek (POL)	8	8.0	14	14.0	6	6.0	~~DSQ~~	~~47.0~~	8	8.0	7	7.0	11	11.0	~~PMS~~	~~47.0~~	17	17.0	165.0	71.0
12	Qian Hong (CHN)	~~27~~	~~27.0~~	12	12.0	~~19~~	~~19.0~~	10	10.0	11	11.0	13	13.0	10	10.0	6	6.0	12	12.0	120.0	74.0
13	I Gusti Made Oka Sulaksana (INA)	~~21~~	~~21.0~~	7	7.0	15	15.0	9	9.0	13	13.0	18	18.0	~~PMS~~	~~47.0~~	14	14.0	5	5.0	149.0	81.0
14	Tony Philp (FIJ)	9	9.0	13	13.0	7	7.0	11	11.0	~~PMS~~	~~47.0~~	14	14.0	~~25~~	~~25.0~~	16	16.0	15	15.0	157.0	85.0
15	Jorge Maciel (ESP)	~~31~~	~~31.0~~	9	9.0	~~23~~	~~23.0~~	14	14.0	7	7.0	3	3.0	18	18.0	22	22.0	14	14.0	141.0	87.0
16	Alain Bolduc (CAN)	~~38~~	~~38.0~~	10	10.0	18	18.0	13	13.0	~~22~~	~~22.0~~	17	17.0	8	8.0	18	18.0	11	11.0	155.0	95.0
17	Morten Egebald Christoffersen (DEN)	~~22~~	~~22.0~~	20	20.0	17	17.0	15	15.0	~~PMS~~	~~47.0~~	8	8.0	15	15.0	19	19.0	7	7.0	170.0	101.0
18	Martijn van Geemen (NED)	15	15.0	17	17.0	12	12.0	23	23.0	12	12.0	~~29~~	~~29.0~~	~~PMS~~	~~47.0~~	20	20.0	19	19.0	194.0	118.0
19	Fredrik Palm (SWE)	34	34.0	19	19.0	11	11.0	22	22.0	16	16.0	~~31~~	~~31.0~~	~~PMS~~	~~47.0~~	13	13.0	16	16.0	209.0	128.0
20	Ansis Dāle (LAT)	24	24.0	25	25.0	~~29~~	~~29.0~~	20	20.0	6	6.0	22	22.0	24	24.0	~~29~~	~~29.0~~	13	13.0	192.0	134.0
21	Arun Homraruen (THA)	13	13.0	27	27.0	14	14.0	~~DNC~~	~~47.0~~	~~31~~	~~31.0~~	28	28.0	17	17.0	5	5.0	34	34.0	216.0	135.0
22	Kutlu Torunlar (TUR)	17	17.0	18	18.0	22	22.0	26	26.0	20	20.0	19	19.0	~~27~~	~~27.0~~	17	17.0	~~29~~	~~29.0~~	195.0	139.0
23	Paul Stoeken (ISV)	~~28~~	~~28.0~~	21	21.0	~~30~~	~~30.0~~	21	21.0	17	17.0	21	21.0	19	19.0	32	32.0	18	18.0	207.0	145.0
24	Howard Plumb (GBR)	~~35~~	~~35.0~~	~~PMS~~	~~47.0~~	24	24.0	12	12.0	25	25.0	11	11.0	22	22.0	21	21.0	32	32.0	229.0	147.0
25	Maksym Oberemko (UKR)	20	20.0	~~31~~	~~31.0~~	21	21.0	17	17.0	26	26.0	~~38~~	~~38.0~~	12	12.0	30	30.0	24	24.0	219.0	150.0
26	Roland Milosevic (VEN)	12	12.0	30	30.0	28	28.0	~~DSQ~~	~~47.0~~	18	18.0	26	26.0	20	20.0	~~33~~	~~33.0~~	21	21.0	235.0	155.0
27	Patrik Pollák (SVK)	19	19.0	23	23.0	25	25.0	19	19.0	~~29~~	~~29.0~~	16	16.0	~~35~~	~~35.0~~	25	25.0	28	28.0	219.0	155.0
28	Wong Tak Sum (HKG)	18	18.0	~~39~~	~~39.0~~	26	26.0	30	30.0	21	21.0	~~PMS~~	~~47.0~~	16	16.0	23	23.0	22	22.0	242.0	156.0
29	Yuri Taguti (BRA)	~~37~~	~~37.0~~	24	24.0	20	20.0	16	16.0	32	32.0	20	20.0	29	29.0	~~37~~	~~37.0~~	33	33.0	248.0	174.0
30	Patrik Hrdina (CZE)	32	32.0	26	26.0	32	32.0	31	31.0	~~35~~	~~35.0~~	24	24.0	14	14.0	24	24.0	~~42~~	~~42.0~~	260.0	183.0
31	Vladimir Moiseyev (RUS)	~~36~~	~~36.0~~	29	29.0	27	27.0	33	33.0	~~36~~	~~36.0~~	34	34.0	21	21.0	26	26.0	25	25.0	267.0	195.0
32	Dimitrios Lappas (CYP)	26	26.0	22	22.0	~~39~~	~~39.0~~	25	25.0	27	27.0	~~36~~	~~36.0~~	33	33.0	27	27.0	35	35.0	270.0	195.0
33	Ok Duck-pil (KOR)	23	23.0	40	40.0	36	36.0	24	24.0	~~PMS~~	~~47.0~~	25	25.0	~~PMS~~	~~47.0~~	28	28.0	26	26.0	296.0	202.0
34	Pedro Silveira (MEX)	33	33.0	~~35~~	~~35.0~~	35	35.0	28	28.0	19	19.0	32	32.0	31	31.0	31	31.0	30	30.0	274.0	204.0
35	Matt Anderson (PUR)	~~39~~	~~39.0~~	32	32.0	37	37.0	35	35.0	24	24.0	~~PMS~~	~~47.0~~	26	26.0	34	34.0	23	23.0	297.0	211.0
36	Andrea Zinali (ITA)	29	29.0	28	28.0	33	33.0	29	29.0	23	23.0	35	35.0	~~PMS~~	~~47.0~~	~~41~~	~~41.0~~	41	41.0	306.0	218.0
37	Constantino Saragosa (AHO)	~~41~~	~~41.0~~	34	34.0	39	39.0	~~DNC~~	~~47.0~~	28	28.0	39	39.0	28	28.0	15	15.0	40	40.0	311.0	223.0
38	Andrew Wilson (MLT)	~~40~~	~~40.0~~	37	37.0	31	31.0	32	32.0	30	30.0	27	27.0	32	32.0	36	36.0	~~39~~	~~39.0~~	304.0	225.0
39	Áron Gádorfalvi (HUN)	25	25.0	33	33.0	34	34.0	~~DSQ~~	~~47.0~~	34	34.0	33	33.0	37	37.0	~~39~~	~~39.0~~	31	31.0	313.0	227.0
40	Andrés Isola (URU)	16	16.0	38	38.0	~~40~~	~~40.0~~	~~DSQ~~	~~47.0~~	38	38.0	30	30.0	30	30.0	39	39.0	37	37.0	315.0	228.0
41	O'Neal Marshall (BAR)	~~45~~	~~45.0~~	41	41.0	~~44~~	~~44.0~~	37	37.0	37	37.0	40	40.0	23	23.0	35	35.0	27	27.0	329.0	240.0
42	Jan Iriarte (GUM)	30	30.0	36	36.0	~~DNF~~	~~47.0~~	38	38.0	33	33.0	42	42.0	~~PMS~~	~~47.0~~	43	43.0	36	36.0	352.0	258.0
43	David Grogono (CAY)	~~42~~	~~42.0~~	~~43~~	~~43.0~~	42	42.0	34	34.0	39	39.0	37	37.0	34	34.0	40	40.0	38	38.0	349.0	264.0
44	Jonathan Barbe (SEY)	~~43~~	~~43.0~~	42	42.0	41	41.0	36	36.0	40	40.0	41	41.0	36	36.0	42	42.0	~~44~~	~~44.0~~	365.0	278.0
45	Cristian Ruata (GUA)	44	44.0	44	44.0	43	43.0	~~DSQ~~	~~47.0~~	41	41.0	43	43.0	38	38.0	~~45~~	~~45.0~~	43	43.0	388.0	296.0
46	Robleh Ali Adou (DJI)	DNF	47.0	45	45.0	45	45.0	39	39.0	~~DNF~~	~~47.0~~	~~DNS~~	~~47.0~~	PMS	47.0	44	44.0	45	45.0	406.0	312.0

=== Daily standings ===
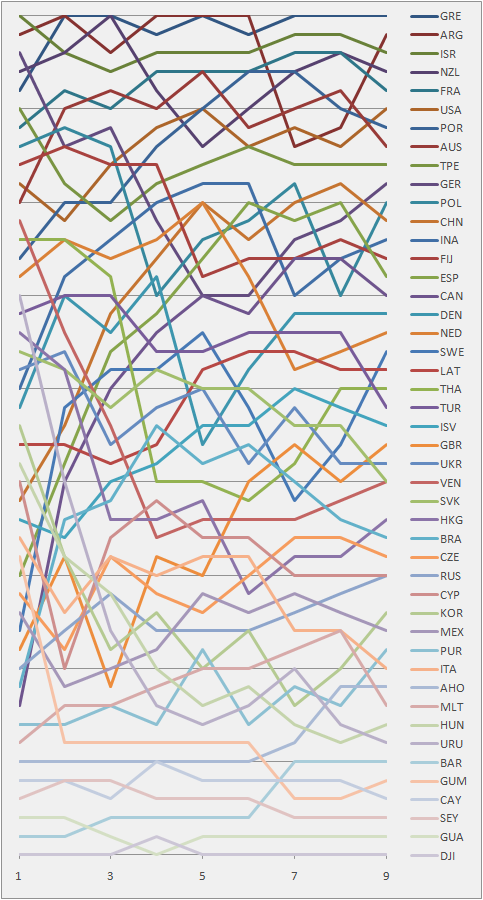
Graph showing the daily standings in the Mistral One Design Men's during the 1996 Summer Olympics

== Conditions at the Mistral course areas ==
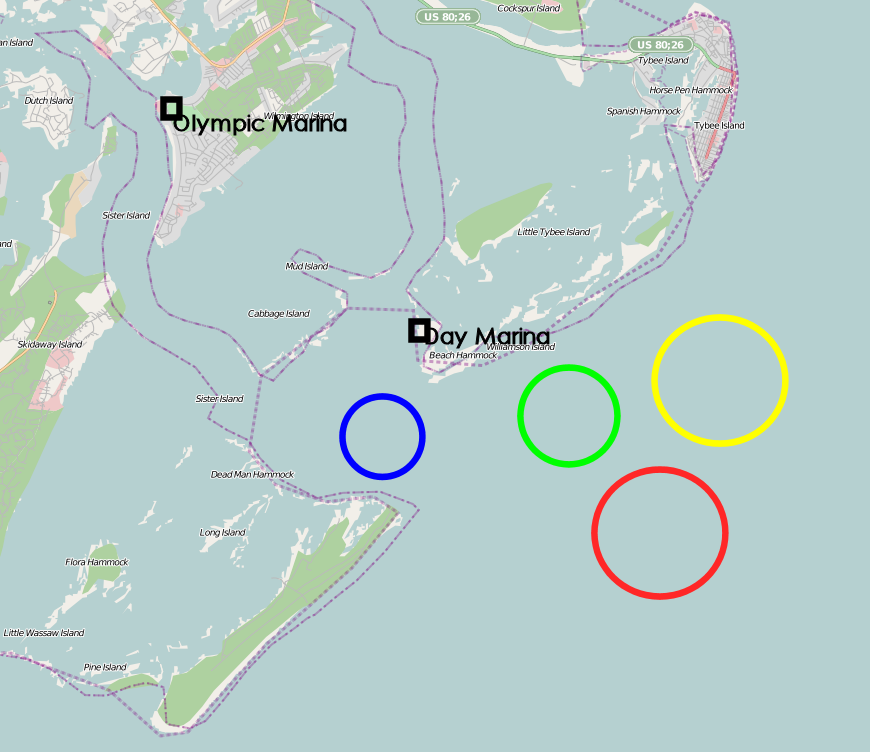
Black: Marinas
Blue: Alpha course
Green: Bravo course
Yellow: Charly course
Red: Delta course

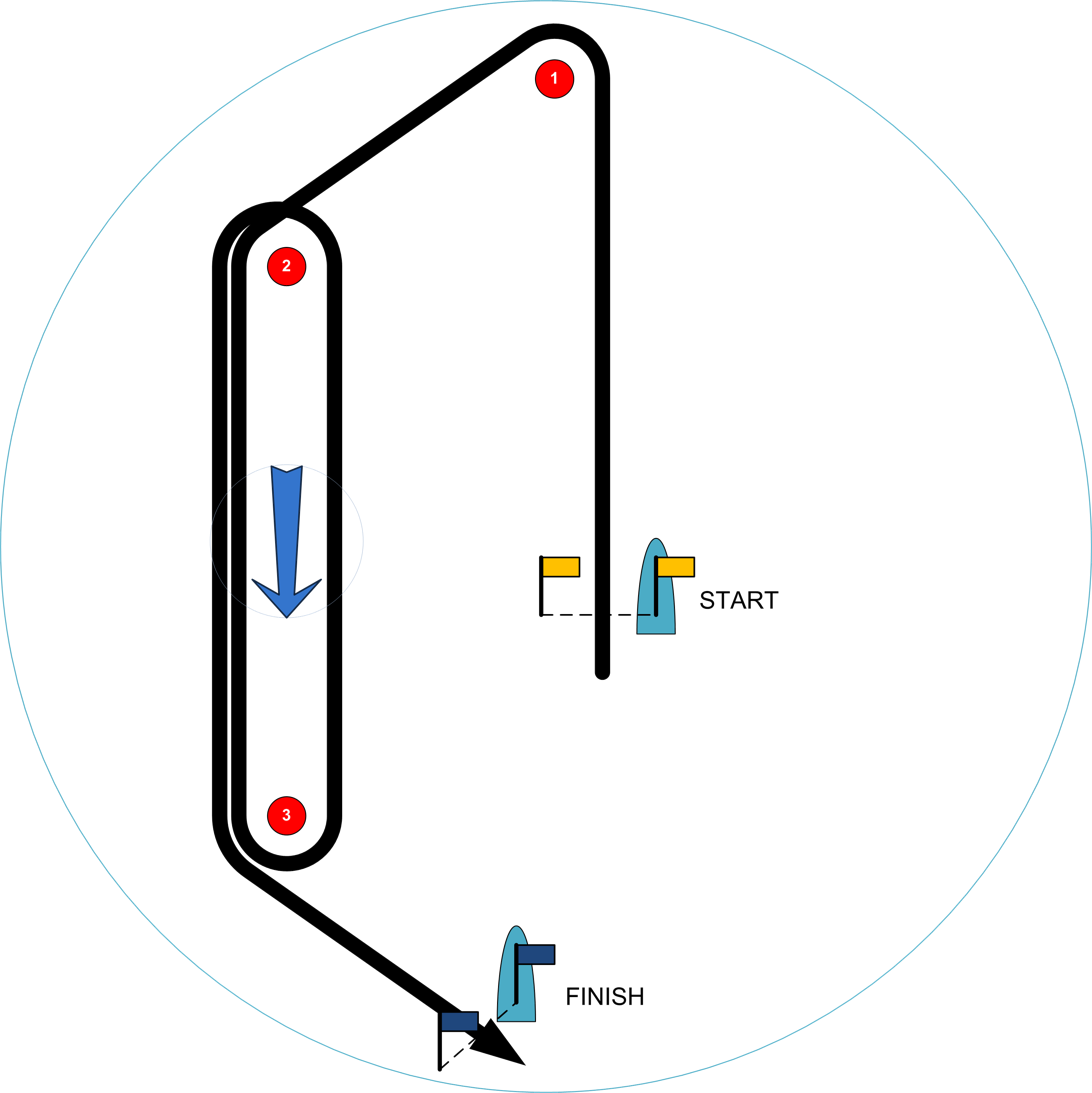
Olympic course ZO.
S(Start) - 1 - 2 - 3 - 2 - 3 - F(Finish reaching)

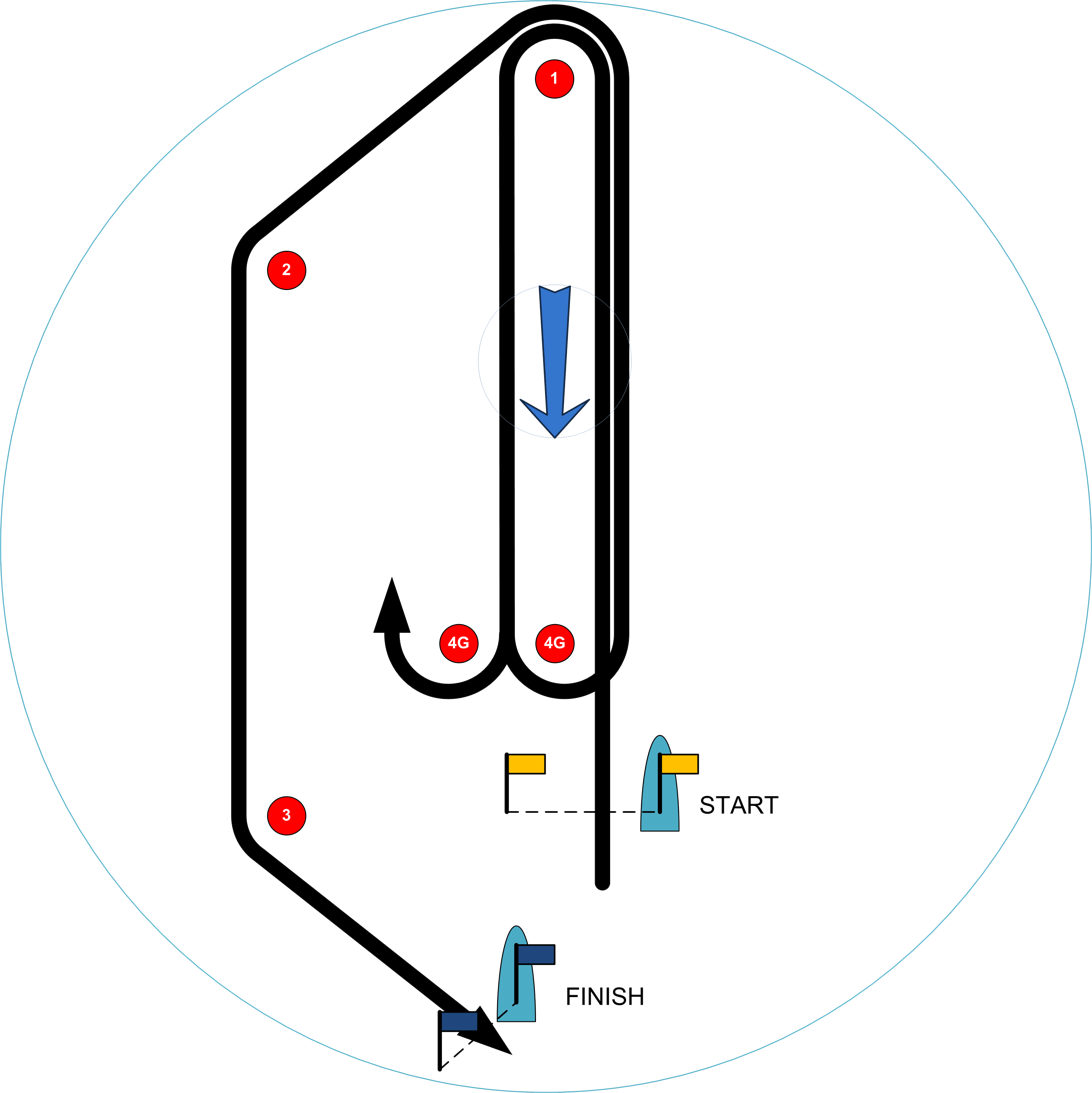
Olympic course ZI.
S(Start) - 1 - 4G - 1 - 2 - 3 - F(Finish reaching)

Date	Race	°C	Knot	Meter	Course	Course area
23 July 1996	I	31	13	0.3		Alpha
23 July 1996	II	30	12	0.3		Alpha
24 July 1996	III	29	10	0.3		Alpha
24 July 1996	IV	26	13	0.3		Alpha
25 July 1996	V	30	11	0.3	ZI	Alpha
26 July 1996	VI	27	8	0.2	ZO	Alpha
26 July 1996	VII	28	10	0.2	ZO	Alpha
29 July 1996	VIII	29	10	0.1	ZO	Alpha
29 July 1996	IX	28	11	0.1	ZI	Alpha
