= Pedro Silveira =

Mexican windsurfer (born 1973)

Personal information
- Nationality: Mexican
- Born: 11 December 1973 (age 52)

Sport
- Sport: Windsurfing

Pedro Silveira (born 11 December 1973) is a Mexican windsurfer. He competed in the men's Mistral One Design event at the 1996 Summer Olympics.
