= Jean-Max de Chavigny =

French windsurfer (1965–2026)

Personal information
- Nationality: French
- Born: 12 October 1965 Schœlcher, Martinique
- Died: 10 October 2026 (aged 60)

Sport
- Sport: Windsurfing

Jean-Max de Chavigny (12 October 1965 – 10 October 2026) was a French windsurfer. He competed in the men's Mistral One Design event at the 1996 Summer Olympics. De Chavigny died on 10 October 2026, at the age of 60.
