= Stéphane Wohnlich =

Swiss sailor

Personal information
- Nationality: Swiss
- Born: 11 December 1968 (age 56)

Sport
- Sport: Sailing

Stéphane Wohnlich (born 11 December 1968) is a Swiss sailor. He competed in the Tornado event at the 1996 Summer Olympics.
