= Yuri Taguti =

Brazilian windsurfer

Personal information
- Born: 5 April 1966 (age 58); Niterói, Brazil

Sport
- Sport: Windsurfing

Yuri Taguti (born 5 April 1966) is a Brazilian windsurfer. He competed in the men's Mistral One Design event at the 1996 Summer Olympics.
