= Matt Anderson (windsurfer) =

Puerto Rican windsurfer (born 1968)

Personal information
- Nationality: Puerto Rican
- Born: 19 May 1968 (age 58)

Sport
- Country: Puerto Rico
- Sport: Windsurfing

Matt Anderson (born 19 May 1968) is a Puerto Rican windsurfer. He competed in the men's Mistral One Design event at the 1996 Summer Olympics.
