= Martijn van Geemen =

Dutch windsurfer

Personal information
- Full name: Cornelis Johannes Martijn van Geemen
- Nationality: Dutch
- Born: 15 December 1971 (age 54) Purmerend
- Height: 1.80 m (5.9 ft)

Sailing career
- Sport: Sailing
- Class: Mistral One Design Class
Competition record
Representing Netherlands
Olympic Games
1996 Savannah	Men's Mistral One Design
- Updated on 19 February 2014

Cornelis Johannes Martijn van Geemen (born 15 December 1971 in Purmerend) is a sailor from the Netherlands, who represented his country for the first time at the 1996 Summer Olympics in Savannah. Van Geemen took the 18th place in the Men's Mistral One Design.
