= Mirosław Małek =

Polish windsurfer

Personal information
- Nationality: Polish
- Born: 9 March 1975 (age 50); Rybnik, Poland

Sport
- Sport: Windsurfing

Mirosław Małek (born 9 March 1975) is a Polish windsurfer. He competed in the men's Mistral One Design event at the 1996 Summer Olympics.
