= Franck Citeau =

French sailor

Personal information
- Nationality: French
- Born: 12 March 1969 (age 56); Guérande, France

Sport
- Sport: Sailing

Franck Citeau (born 12 March 1969) is a French sailor. He competed in the Tornado event at the 1996 Summer Olympics.
