= Sailing at the 1996 Summer Olympics – Tornado =

Sailing at the Olympics

Tornado at the Games of the XXVI Olympiad
- Tornado
- Venue: Savannah
- Dates: 22 July to 2 August
- Competitors: 38 from 19 nations
- Teams: 19

Medalists
1st place, gold medalist(s)		Fernando Leon; Jose Luis Ballester	Spain
2nd place, silver medalist(s)		Mitch Booth; Andrew Landenberger	Australia
3rd place, bronze medalist(s)		Lars Grael; Henrique Pellicano	Brazil

The Tornado Competition was a sailing event on the program at the 1996 Summer Olympics that was held from 22 July to 2 August 1996 in Savannah, Georgia, United States. Points were awarded for placement in each race. Eleven races were scheduled and sailed. Each team had two discards.

== Results ==
Rank	Helmsman (Country)	Crew	Race I		Race II		Race III		Race IV		Race V		Race VI		Race VII		Race VIII		Race IX		Race X		Race XI		Total Points	Total -1
Rank	Helmsman (Country)	Crew	Rank	Pts	Rank	Pts	Rank	Pts	Rank	Pts	Rank	Pts	Rank	Pts	Rank	Pts	Rank	Pts	Rank	Pts	Rank	Pts	Rank	Pts	Total Points	Total -1
1st place, gold medalist(s)	Fernando Leon (ESP)	Jose Luis Ballester	2	2.0	2	2.0	4	4.0	5	5.0	5	5.0	2	2.0	4	4.0	3	3.0	~~PMS~~	~~20.0~~	3	3.0	~~DNC~~	~~20.0~~	70.0	30.0
2nd place, silver medalist(s)	Mitch Booth (AUS)	Andrew Landenberger	1	1.0	5	5.0	6	6.0	2	2.0	~~14~~	~~14.0~~	17	17.0	1	1.0	1	1.0	~~PMS~~	~~20.0~~	2	2.0	10	10.0	79.0	42.0
3rd place, bronze medalist(s)	Lars Grael (BRA)	Henrique Pellicano	~~12~~	~~12.0~~	~~16~~	~~16.0~~	1	1.0	8	8.0	6	6.0	8	8.0	2	2.0	5	5.0	3	3.0	7	7.0	3	3.0	71.0	43.0
4	Andreas Hagara (AUT)	Florian Schneeberger	4	4.0	3	3.0	5	5.0	6	6.0	1	1.0	7	7.0	10	10.0	~~13~~	~~13.0~~	7	7.0	~~13~~	~~13.0~~	1	1.0	70.0	44.0
5	Walter Pirinoli (ITA)	Marco Pirinoli	~~16~~	~~16.0~~	12	12.0	~~PMS~~	~~20.0~~	3	3.0	3	3.0	5	5.0	6	6.0	4	4.0	5	5.0	4	4.0	2	2.0	80.0	44.0
6	Frédéric le Peutrec (FRA)	Franck Citeau	8	8.0	1	1.0	3	3.0	7	7.0	8	8.0	4	4.0	5	5.0	~~11~~	~~11.0~~	4	4.0	6	6.0	~~9~~	~~9.0~~	66.0	46.0
7	Roland Gabler (GER)	Frank Parlow	~~15~~	~~15.0~~	8	8.0	11	11.0	1	1.0	~~12~~	~~12.0~~	9	9.0	9	9.0	2	2.0	2	2.0	1	1.0	5	5.0	75.0	48.0
8	John Lovell (USA)	Charlie Ogletree	3	3.0	4	4.0	8	8.0	4	4.0	4	4.0	11	11.0	3	3.0	~~12~~	~~12.0~~	1	1.0	10	10.0	~~12~~	~~12.0~~	72.0	48.0
9	Ron van Teylingen (NED)	Herbert Dercksen	13	13.0	6	6.0	2	2.0	~~17~~	~~17.0~~	2	2.0	6	6.0	7	7.0	9	9.0	~~PMS~~	~~20.0~~	5	5.0	6	6.0	93.0	56.0
10	Patrick Thorens (SUI)	Stéphane Wohnlich	7	7.0	9	9.0	~~13~~	~~13.0~~	11	11.0	10	10.0	1	1.0	11	11.0	7	7.0	10	10.0	11	11.0	~~13~~	~~13.0~~	103.0	77.0
11	Marc Peers (CAN)	Roy Janse	~~17~~	~~17.0~~	11	11.0	9	9.0	9	9.0	9	9.0	12	12.0	~~17~~	~~17.0~~	8	8.0	9	9.0	8	8.0	8	8.0	117.0	83.0
12	Yuriy Konovalov (RUS)	Sergey Myasnikov	11	11.0	10	10.0	7	7.0	12	12.0	~~18~~	~~18.0~~	3	3.0	15	15.0	10	10.0	8	8.0	~~17~~	~~17.0~~	11	11.0	122.0	87.0
13	David Williams (GBR)	Ian Rhodes	5	5.0	7	7.0	12	12.0	10	10.0	~~13~~	~~13.0~~	~~DSQ~~	~~20.0~~	8	8.0	14	14.0	6	6.0	12	12.0	14	14.0	121.0	87.0
14	Sergey Kravtsov (BLR)	Viktor Budantsev	9	9.0	15	15.0	~~PMS~~	~~20.0~~	~~16~~	~~16.0~~	11	11.0	10	10.0	16	16.0	6	6.0	11	11.0	16	16.0	7	7.0	137.0	101.0
15	Rex Sellers (NZL)	Brian Jones	14	14.0	14	14.0	10	10.0	13	13.0	~~17~~	~~17.0~~	14	14.0	12	12.0	~~16~~	~~16.0~~	12	12.0	14	14.0	4	4.0	140.0	107.0
16	Mats Nyberg (SWE)	Magnus Lövdén	10	10.0	~~PMS~~	~~20.0~~	16	16.0	14	14.0	7	7.0	16	16.0	14	14.0	15	15.0	13	13.0	9	9.0	~~17~~	~~17.0~~	151.0	114.0
17	Serhiy Priymak (UKR)	Yevhen Chelombitko	6	6.0	13	13.0	14	14.0	~~15~~	~~15.0~~	15	15.0	13	13.0	13	13.0	~~17~~	~~17.0~~	14	14.0	15	15.0	18	18.0	153.0	118.0
18	Shayne Brodie (FIJ)	Angus Pattie	~~18~~	~~18.0~~	17	17.0	15	15.0	~~18~~	~~18.0~~	16	16.0	15	15.0	18	18.0	18	18.0	15	15.0	18	18.0	15	15.0	183.0	147.0
19	Alun Davies (CAY)	Michael Joseph	~~19~~	~~19.0~~	18	18.0	17	17.0	19	19.0	19	19.0	18	18.0	19	19.0	19	19.0	~~PMS~~	~~20.0~~	19	19.0	16	16.0	203.0	164.0

== Daily standings ==
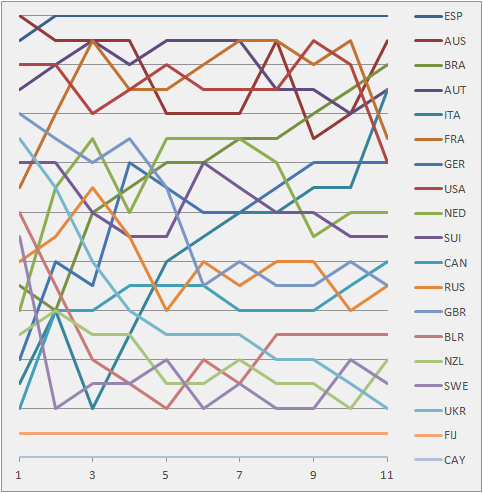
Graph showing the daily standings in the Tornado during the 1996 Summer Olympics

== Conditions at the Tornado course areas ==
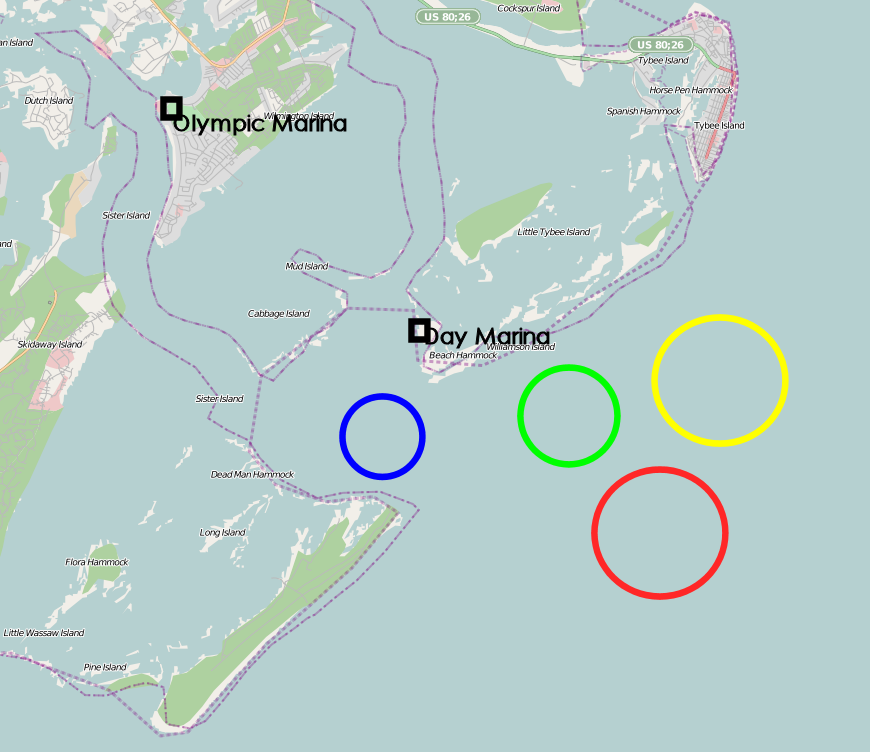
Black: Marinas
Blue: Alpha course
Green: Bravo course
Yellow: Charly course
Red: Delta course

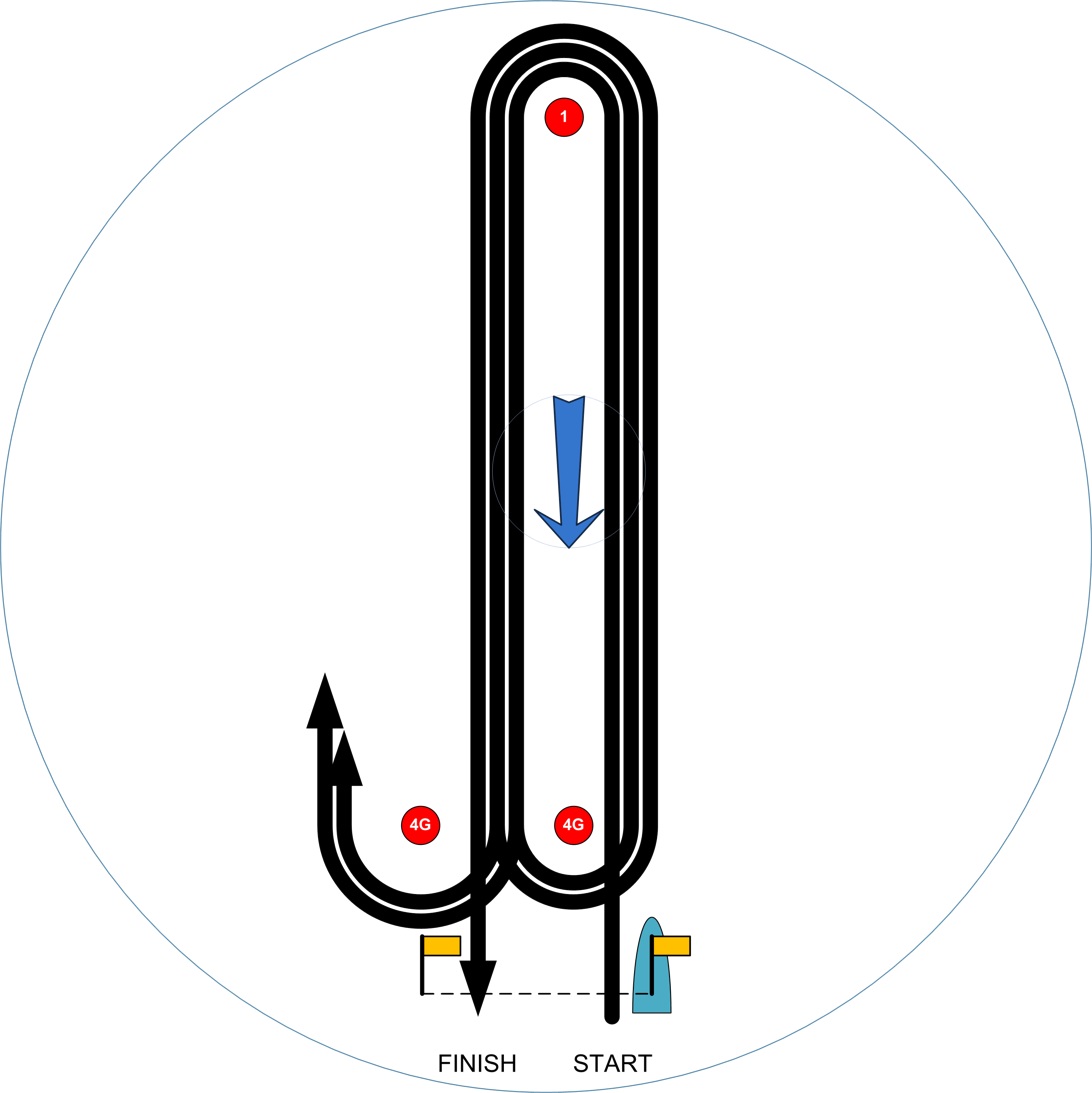
Olympic course WX.
S(Start) - 1 - 4G - 1 - 4G - 1 - F(Finish downwind)

Date	Race	°C	Knot	Meter	Course	Course area
23 July 1996	I	29	10	0.8		Delta
23 July 1996	II	29	13	0.8	WX	Delta
26 July 1996	III	27	7	0.5	WX	Delta
26 July 1996	IV	27	10	0.5	WX	Delta
27 July 1996	V	28	7	0.5	WX	Delta
27 July 1996	VI	28	8	0.6	WX	Delta
28 July 1996	VII	29	6	0.7	WX	Delta
28 July 1996	VIII	29	9	0.6	WX	Delta
29 July 1996	IX	29	11	0.6	WX	Delta
29 July 1996	X	28	11	0.4	WX	Delta
30 July 1996	XI	28	8	0.4	WX	Delta

== Sources ==
- The Atlanta Committee for the Olympic Games (1997). The Official Report of the Centennial Olympic Games, Volume I Planning and Organization (PDF). Atlanta: Peachtree Publishers. Archived from the original (PDF) on 16 June 2012.
- The Atlanta Committee for the Olympic Games (1997). The Official Report of the Centennial Olympic Games, Volume II The Centennial Olympic Games (PDF). Atlanta: Peachtree Publishers. Archived from the original (PDF) on 15 July 2012.
- The Atlanta Committee for the Olympic Games (1997). The Official Report of the Centennial Olympic Games, Volume III The Competition Results (PDF). Atlanta: Peachtree Publishers. Archived from the original (PDF) on 16 July 2012.
- Hugh Drake & Paul Henderson (2009). Canada's Olympic Sailing Legacy, Paris 1924 - Beijing 2008. Toronto: CYA.
- Evans, Hilary; Gjerde, Arild; Heijmans, Jeroen; Mallon, Bill; et al. "Sailing at the 1996 Atlanta Summer Games: Tornado". Olympics at Sports-Reference.com. Sports Reference LLC. Archived from the original on 17 April 2020.
- "IYRU Olympic Update". ISAF. Archived from the original on 2 April 2012.
