= Michael Josephs =

Michael Josephs may refer to:

- Michael Josephs (Hebraist) (1763–1849), English lexicographer and Hebraist
- Michael Josephs (composer) (born 1959), American composer

== See also ==
- Michael Joseph (disambiguation)
