= Serhiy Priymak =

Ukrainian sailor

Personal information
- Nationality: Ukrainian
- Born: 25 December 1957 (age 67)

Sport
- Sport: Sailing

Serhiy Priymak (born 25 December 1957) is a Ukrainian sailor. He competed in the Tornado event at the 1996 Summer Olympics.
