= Andrew Wilson (windsurfer) =

Maltese windsurfer

Personal information
- Nationality: Maltese
- Born: 13 December 1975 (age 50)

Sailing career
- Sport: Sailing
- Class(es): Contender, International 14, Mistral

Andrew Wilson (born 13 December 1975) is a Maltese windsurfer. He competed in the men's Mistral One Design event at the 1996 Summer Olympics.
