= Angus Pattie =

Fijian sailor

Personal information
- Nationality: Fijian
- Born: 14 September 1964 (age 61)

Sport
- Sport: Sailing

Angus Pattie (born 14 September 1964) is a Fijian sailor. He competed in the Tornado event at the 1996 Summer Olympics.
