= Henrique Pellicano =

Brazilian sailor (born 1974)

Medal record

Olympic Games

Representing Brazil

Men's Sailing
Bronze medal – third place	1996 Atlanta	Tornado

Henrique "Kiko" Pellicano (born February 28, 1974) is a Brazilian sailor. He won the bronze medal in the Tornado Class at the 1996 Summer Olympics in Atlanta along with Lars Grael. Pellicano hails from a family of sailors, with his sister Márcia being a veteran of three Olympics who won a gold medal at the 1995 Pan American Games. He has competed in many long-distance sailing competitions, including the Volvo Ocean Race 2005-06 on the boat Brasil 1.
