= Yevhen Chelombitko =

Ukrainian sailor

Personal information
- Nationality: Ukrainian
- Born: 22 November 1965 (age 59)

Sport
- Sport: Sailing

Yevhen Chelombitko (born 22 November 1965) is a Ukrainian sailor. He competed in the Tornado event at the 1996 Summer Olympics.
