= Kara McGaw =

Canadian softball player

Personal information
- Born: 11 April 1966 (age 59) Toronto, Ontario, Canada

Sport
- Sport: Softball

Kara McGaw (born 11 April 1966) is a Canadian softball player. She competed in the women's tournament at the 1996 Summer Olympics.
