= Marc Peers =

Canadian sailor

Personal information
- Born: 8 April 1971 (age 55) Edmonton, Alberta, Canada

Sport
- Sport: Sailing

Marc Peers (born 8 April 1971) is a Canadian sailor. He competed in the Tornado event at the 1996 Summer Olympics. He placed 11th with his sailing partner Roy Janse.
