= Alun Davies (sailor) =

Caymanian sailor

Personal information
- Nationality: Caymanian
- Born: 30 June 1963 (age 61)

Sport
- Sport: Sailing

Alun Davies (born 30 June 1963) is a Caymanian sailor. He competed in the Tornado event at the 1996 Summer Olympics.
