= Sandy Beasley =

Canadian softball player

Personal information
- Nationality: Canadian
- Born: 1 January 1968 (age 57); Richmond, British Columbia, Canada

Sport
- Sport: Softball

Sandy Beasley (born 1 January 1968) is a Canadian softball player. She competed in the women's tournament at the 1996 Summer Olympics.
