= Lori Sippel =

Canadian softball player (born 1965)

Personal information
- Born: 16 May 1965 (age 61) Stratford, Ontario, Canada

Sport
- Sport: Softball

Lori Sippel (born 16 May 1965) is a Canadian softball player. She competed in the women's tournament at the 1996 Summer Olympics, and coached the team at the 2008 Summer Olympics.
