= Karen Snelgrove =

Canadian softball player

Personal information
- Born: 12 March 1969 (age 57) London, Ontario, Canada

Sport
- Sport: Softball

Karen Snelgrove (born 12 March 1969) is a Canadian softball player. She competed in the women's tournament at the 1996 Summer Olympics.
