= Candace Murray =

Canadian softball player

Personal information
- Nationality: Canadian
- Born: 17 January 1970 (age 55) Vancouver, British Columbia, Canada

Sport
- Sport: Softball

Candace Murray (born 17 January 1970) is a Canadian softball player. She competed in the women's tournament at the 1996 Summer Olympics.
