= Juan Vairo =

Argentine footballer and manager

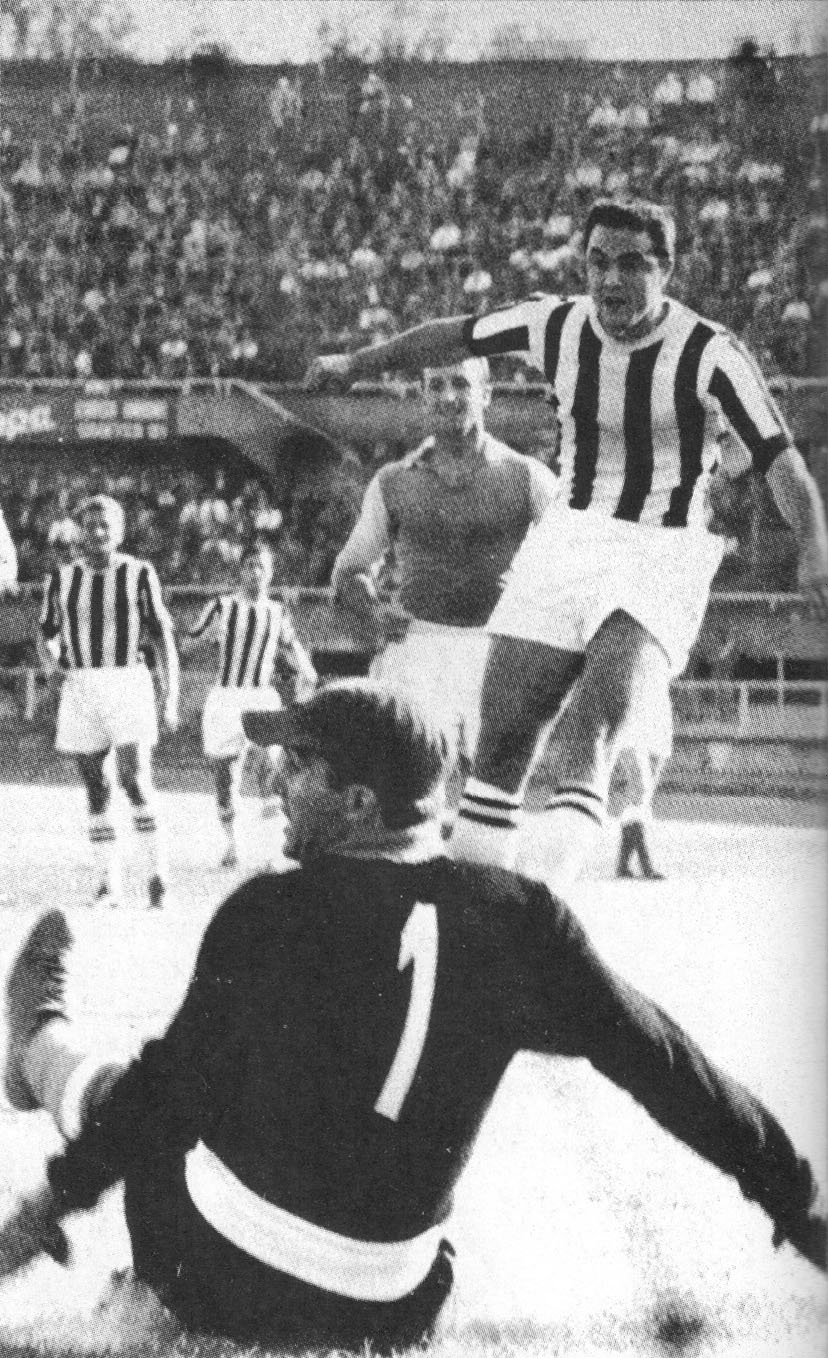
- Vairo (right) in action with Juventus in 1955

Personal information
- Full name: Juan Apolonio Vairo Moramarco
- Date of birth: April 10, 1932 (age 94)
- Place of birth: Rosario, Argentina
- Position: Midfielder

Senior career*
Years	Team	Apps	(Gls)
1950–1952	Rosario Central	21	(6)
1953–1954	Boca Juniors	21	(9)
1955–1956	Juventus	11	(3)
1957–1958	River Plate	12	(2)
1959–1960	Liverpool		
1961	Independiente Medellín	39	(30)
1962–1963	Deportes Quindío	45	(21)
1965–1968	Tigre		
1965	Montreal Italica		
- * Club domestic league appearances and goals

Juan Apolonio Vairo Moramarco (born April 10, 1932, in Rosario) is a retired Argentine professional football player.

His older brother Federico Vairo played for the Argentina national football team. In the summer of 1965 he played in the Eastern Canada Professional Soccer League with Montreal Italica.

After retiring as a player he went on to become a football manager, coaching Universitario de Oriente in Venezuela in the 1970s.

== Honours ==
Boca Juniors

- Primera División Argentina champion: 1954.

Champion Club Atletico River Plate 1957/58 Champion Rosario Central Division "B" 1951 AFA (Asociacion Futbol Argentino) 54 games, 17 goals
