= Christine Parris =

Canadian softball player (born 1967)

Personal information
- Born: 23 January 1967 (age 59) Truro, Nova Scotia, Canada

Sport
- Sport: Softball

Christine Parris (born 23 January 1967) is a Canadian softball player. She competed in the women's tournament at the 1996 Summer Olympics.
