= Dianne Norman =

Canadian basketball player

Dianne Norman (born 5 February 1971) is a Canadian former basketball player who competed at the 1996 Summer Olympics and the 2000 Summer Olympics.

Born in 1971 in Sault Ste. Marie, Ontario, Norman played many sports growing up including soccer, rugby, field hockey and volleyball. Her first year on the Canadian national team was when she was 16. Norman went on to study political science and philosophy at Laurentian University. As well as the two Olympic Games, she was in three Pan American Games (1991, 1999 and 2003). She played professionally in Switzerland, Spain and Germany. She retired in 2004, after 16 years. She is now the director of change management at Toronto Metropolitan University and is a doctoral student at Ontario Institute for Studies in Education of the University of Toronto.

== Awards and honors ==
- Top 100 U Sports women's basketball Players of the Century (1920–2020).
- Named "All Canadian" four times
- Inducted into the Canadian Basketball Hall of Fame
- Inducted into the Laurentian Hall of Fame
- Inducted into the New Brunswick Hall of Fame
