= Carson Ebanks =

Caymanian sailor (born 1956)

Personal information
- Nationality: Caymanian
- Born: 25 February 1956 (age 70)

Sport
- Sport: Sailing

Carson Ebanks (born 25 February 1956) is a Caymanian sailor. He competed at the 1984 Summer Olympics and the 1996 Summer Olympics.
