= Alain Bolduc =

Canadian windsurfer

Personal information
- Born: 3 August 1972 (age 54) Montreal, Quebec, Canada

Sport
- Sport: Windsurfing

Alain Bolduc (born 3 August 1972) is a Canadian windsurfer. He competed in the men's Mistral One Design event at the 1996 Summer Olympics.
