= Rodniki, Novosibirsk =

Rodniki
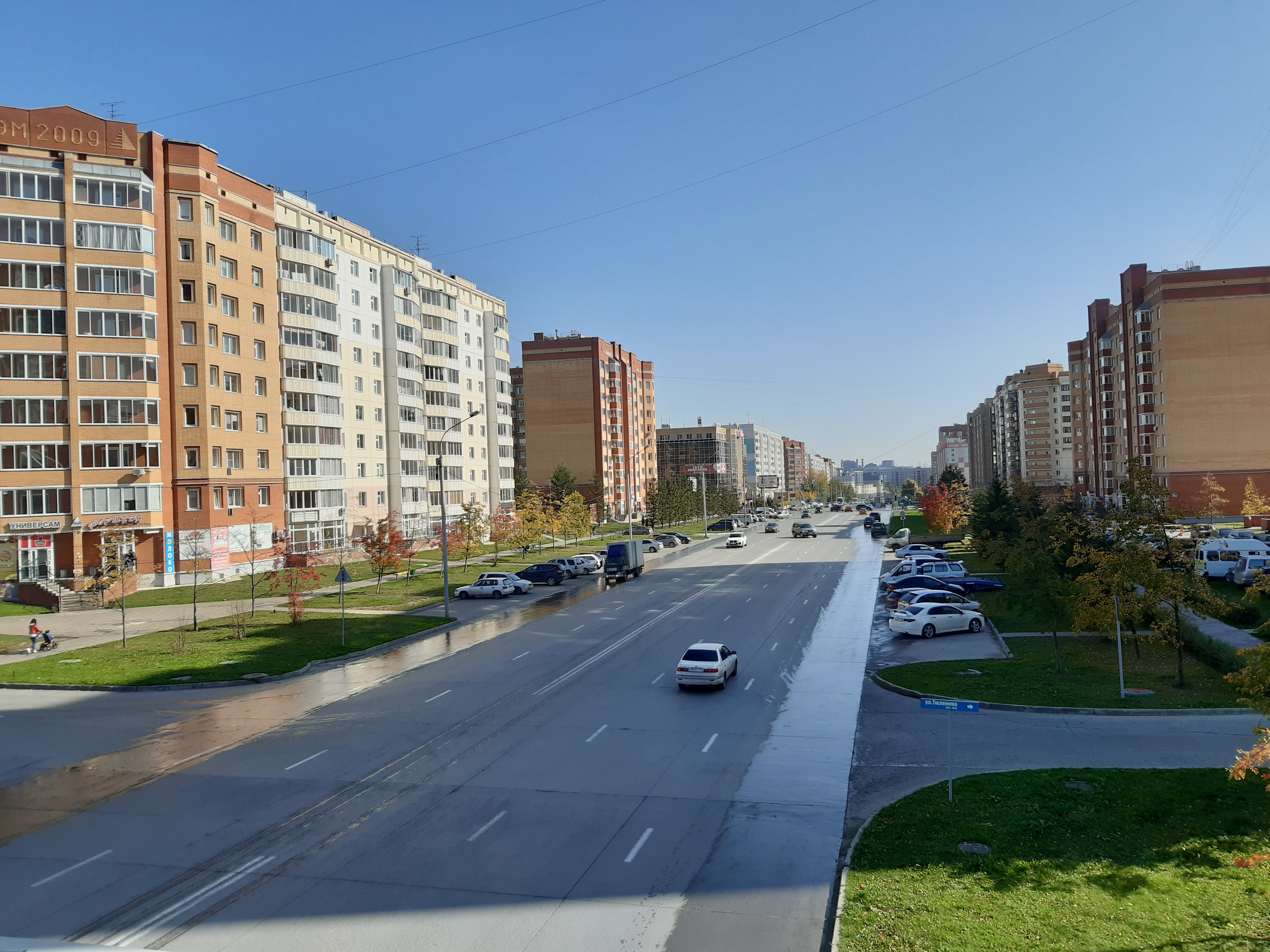
- Interactive map of Rodniki
- Coordinates: 55.108°N 82.948°E
- Country: Russia
- City: Novosibirsk
- District: Kalininsky District

Rodniki is a microdistrict in Kalininsky District of Novosibirsk, Russia. Population of over 65,000.

== History ==
The first residential buildings of the microdistrict were built in the 1980s.

== Education ==
8 kindergartens and 4 secondary schools (No. 203, No. 207, No. 211, No. 218) are located in the microdistrict.

== Religion ==
- Saint Andrew the Apostle Church is an Orthodox church built in 2012–2017.

== Economy ==
=== Retail ===
The microdistrict hosts shops of Lenta and Leroy Merlin.

== Sports ==
- Sports complex with a fencing hall and a swimming pool.

== Gallery ==
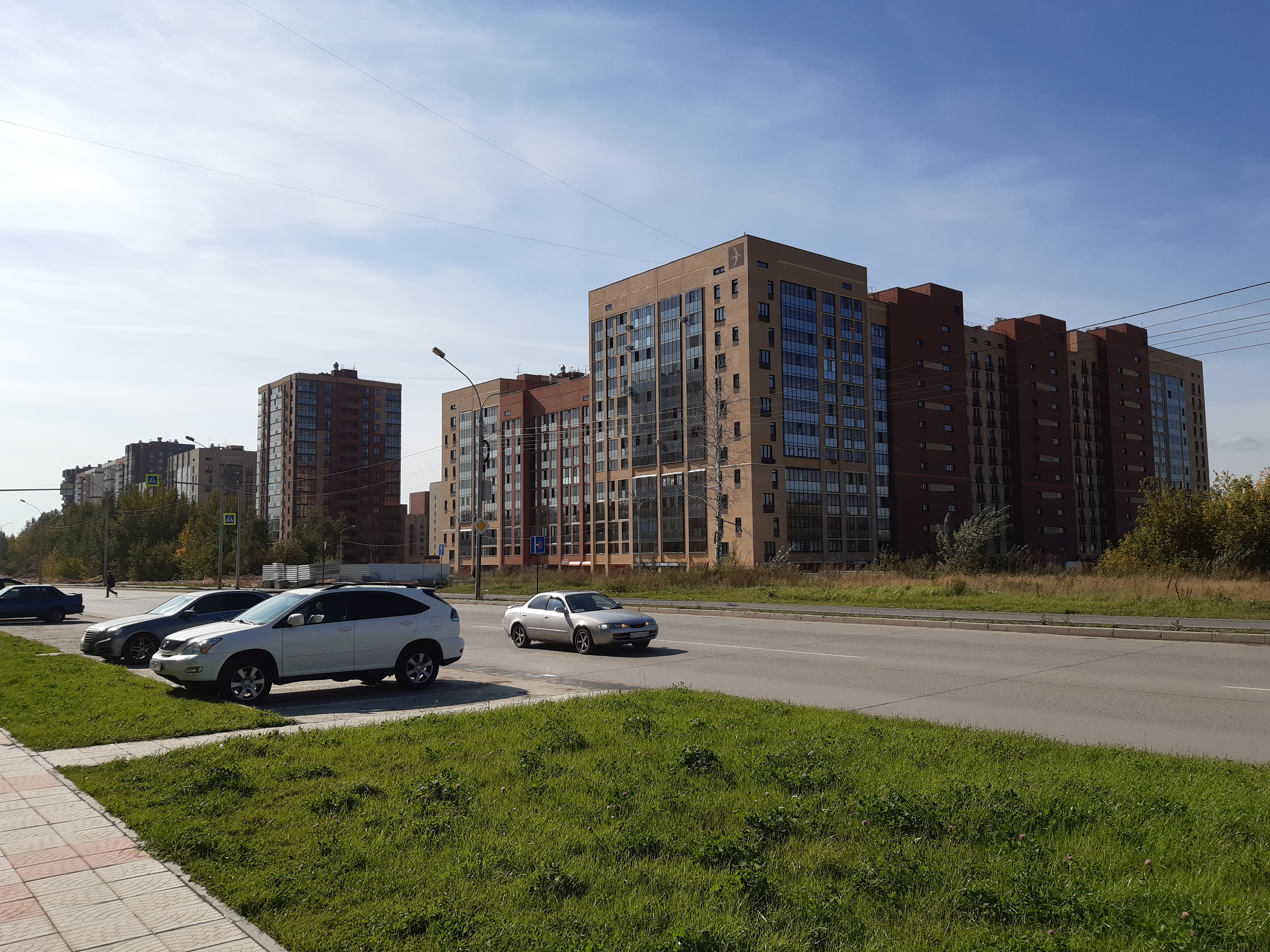
Krasny Avenue

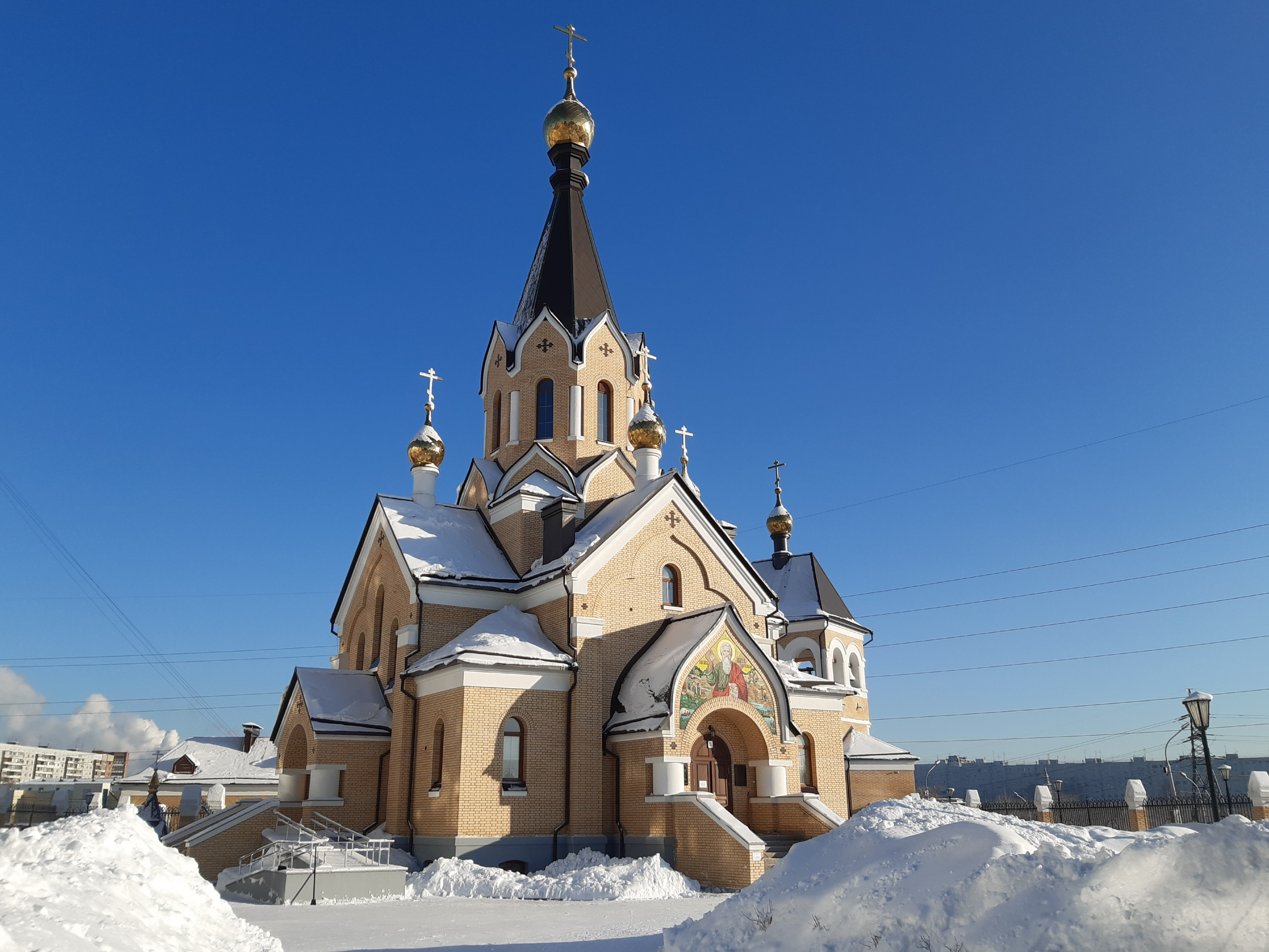
Saint Andrew the Apostle Church

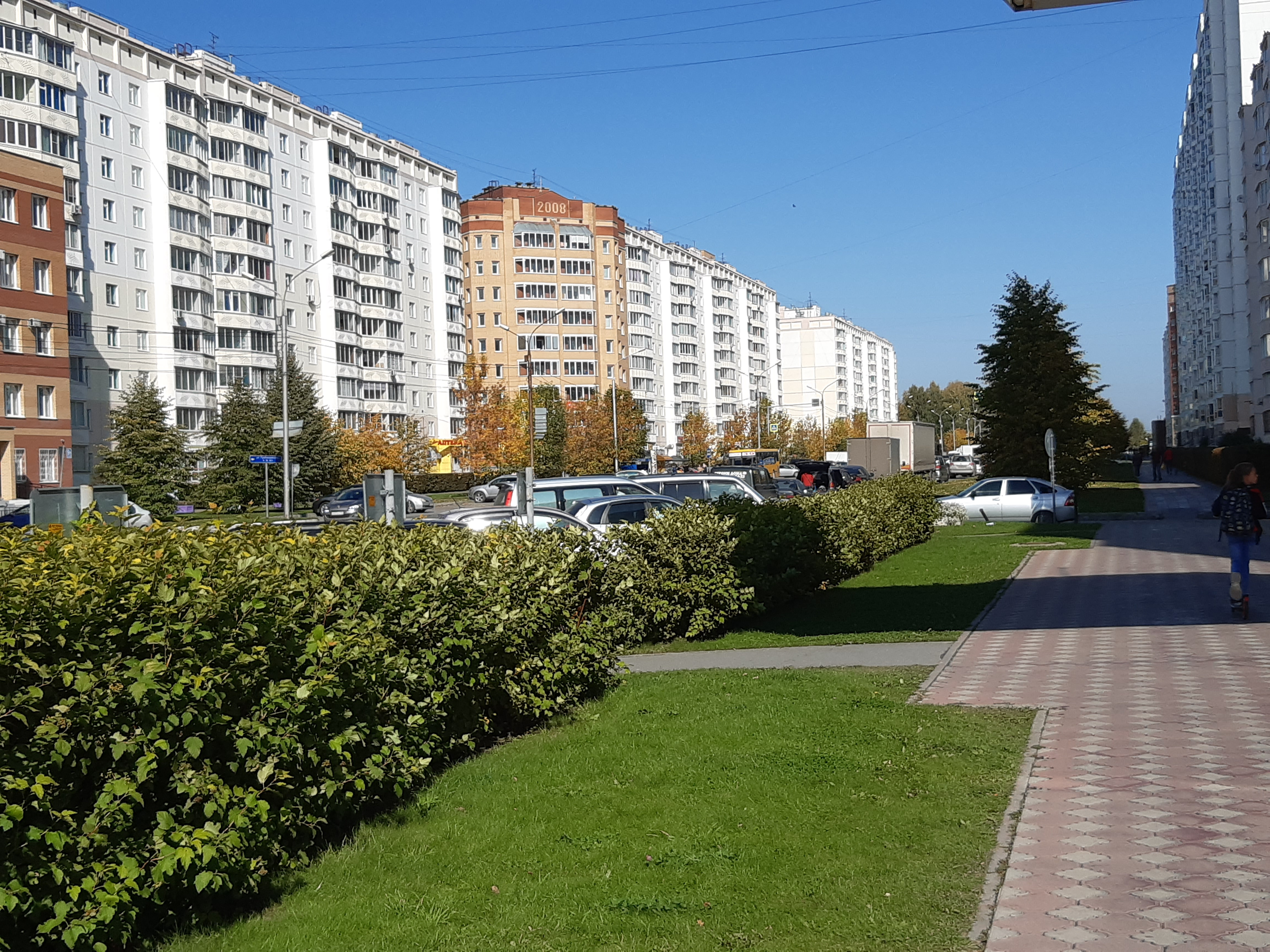
Grebenshchikov Street
