= Federico Vairo =

Argentine footballer

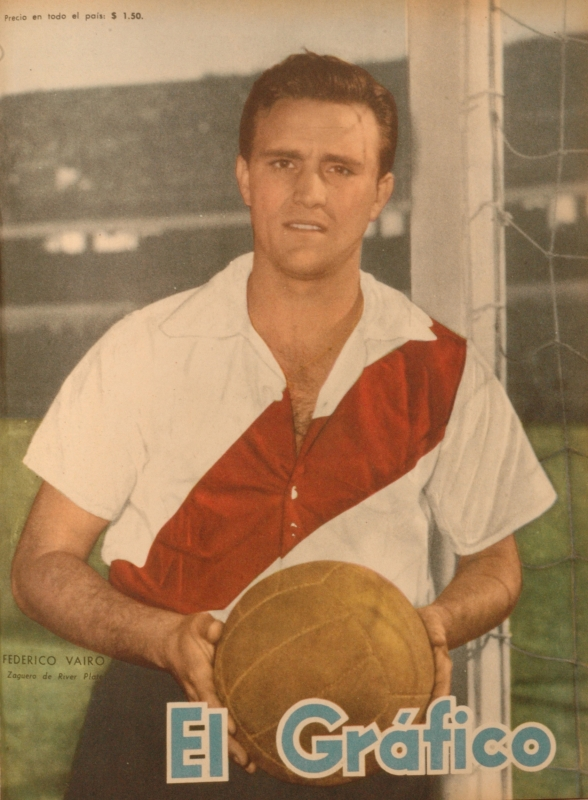
- Vairo during his run on River Plate

Personal information
- Full name: Federico Vairo Moramarco
- Date of birth: 27 January 1930
- Place of birth: Rosario, Argentina
- Date of death: 7 December 2010 (aged 80)
- Place of death: Buenos Aires, Argentina
- Position: Defender

Senior career*
Years	Team	Apps	(Gls)
1950–1954	Rosario Central	100	(10)
1955–1959	River Plate	97	(3)
1960–1966	O'Higgins	106	(4)
1967	Deportivo Cali	?	(?)

International career
1955–1958	Argentina	41	(1)
- * Club domestic league appearances and goals as of June 2007

Federico Vairo Moramarco (27 January 1930 – 7 December 2010) was an Argentine football defender who won three consecutive league titles with River Plate and represented Argentina at the 1958 World Cup.

His younger brother Juan Apolonio Vairo Moramarco also played football professionally, including one season for Juventus.

== Early life ==
Federico Vairo was born in Rosario, Argentina.

== Club career ==
Vairo started his career at Rosario Central in his home city in 1947, he played for the club for 8 seasons before moving to Buenos Aires to play for River Plate. River won three consecutive league titles between 1955 and 1957.

Vairo played for the Argentina National team at the World Cup held in Sweden in 1958. At one time he was the player with the most games played for the national team. His record was not broken until the 1990s.

In 1960 Vairo joined Chilean O'Higgins. His first three seasons with the club resulted in mid-table finishes, but the 1963 campaign saw the club relegated, finishing 18th and last in the table.

1964 saw O'Higgins' successful return to the Primera División de Chile by winning the Chilean Second Division title. In 1965 Vairo dedicated his life to the youth leagues as coach of River Plate, where he was in charge of training and turning amateurs to professionals first division footballers.

From 1999 to 2010, River Plate hired him to scout youth players from the Santa Fe Province. One of the best players he scouted was Lionel Messi, when he was 12 years old, despite the fact that he later left the club for Barcelona.

In 2005, he was given an award at the 50th anniversary party of O'Higgins.

Season	Club	Title
1955	River Plate	Primera Division Argentina
1956	River Plate	Primera Division Argentina
1957	River Plate	Primera Division Argentina
1964	O'Higgins	Chilean Second Division
1967	Deportivo Cali	Copa Mustang

== International career ==
Between 1955 and 1958 Vairo played 41 games for the Argentina national football team. He helped Argentina to win the 1957 Copa America and represented Argentina at the 1958 World Cup.

Season	Club	Title
1957	Argentina	Copa America

== Death ==
On 7 December 2010, Federico Vairo died in a hospital in Buenos Aires, Argentina, from stomach cancer. He is survived by his brother Juan Vairo, his wife Marta, and his three children, Graciela, Daniel, and Claudia.
