= Kelly Kelland =

Canadian softball player

Personal information
- Born: 1 November 1962 (age 63) London, Ontario, Canada

Sport
- Sport: Softball

Kelly Kelland (born 1 November 1962) is a Canadian softball player. She competed in the women's tournament at the 1996 Summer Olympics.
