= Alecia Stephenson =

Canadian softball player

Personal information
- Nationality: Canadian
- Born: 12 March 1966 (age 59) Vancouver, British Columbia, Canada

Sport
- Sport: Softball

Alecia Stephenson (born 12 March 1966) is a Canadian softball player. She competed in the women's tournament at the 1996 Summer Olympics.
