= Pauline Maurice =

Canadian softball player

Personal information
- Born: 17 December 1967 (age 58) Welland, Ontario, Canada

Sport
- Sport: Softball

Pauline Maurice (born 17 December 1967) is a Canadian softball player. She competed in the women's tournament at the 1996 Summer Olympics.
