= Carrie Flemmer =

Canadian softball player

Personal information
- Born: 4 August 1967 (age 58) Stettler, Alberta, Canada

Sport
- Sport: Softball

Carrie Flemmer (born 4 August 1967) is a Canadian softball player. She competed in the women's tournament at the 1996 Summer Olympics.
