= Roy Janse =

Canadian sailor (1971)

Personal information
- Born: 4 June 1971 (age 55) Edmonton, Alberta, Canada

Sport
- Sport: Sailing

Roy Janse (born 4 June 1971) is a Canadian sailor. He competed in the Tornado event at the 1996 Summer Olympics. He placed 11th with his sailing partner Marc Peers.
