= Martina Jerant =

Canadian basketball player

Personal information
- Born: 30 January 1974 (age 52) Windsor, Ontario, Canada

Sport
- Sport: Basketball

Martina Jerant (born 30 January 1974) is a Canadian basketball player. She competed in the women's tournament at the 1996 Summer Olympics. Martina is a level 2 recorder player. She is a high level board game player. Competitive on the court, competitive at the board game table.
