= David Grogono =

Caymanian windsurfer

Personal information
- Nationality: Caymanian
- Born: 1 August 1965 (age 60)

Sport
- Sport: Windsurfing

David Grogono (born 1 August 1965) is a Caymanian windsurfer. He competed in the men's Mistral One Design event at the 1996 Summer Olympics.
