= Sergey Myasnikov =

Russian sailor (born 1967)

Personal information
- Nationality: Russian
- Born: 27 January 1967 (age 59)

Sport
- Sport: Sailing

Sergey Myasnikov (born 27 January 1967) is a Russian sailor. He competed in the Tornado event at the 1996 Summer Olympics.
