= Sue Palmer =

Author and Childhood Campaigner

- Education: Moray House College, Edinburgh; Open University; Manchester University
- Occupations: Author, Teacher, Broadcaster
- Writing career
- Language: English
- Notable works: Toxic Childhood; Detoxing Childhood; 21st Century Boys; 21st Century Girls
- Website: www.suepalmer.co.uk

Sue Palmer is an independent writer and consultant on primary education, particularly literacy. She was formerly a primary headteacher in the Scottish Borders.

== Career ==
She has written over 200 books, TV programmes, and software packages for children and teachers. As an independent consultant, she has worked with the DfES, National Literacy Trust, Basic Skills Agency, numerous educational publishers, and the BBC. In 2004, she collaborated with Early Years specialist Ros Bayley to produce Foundations of Literacy, now in its third edition.

Palmer's book 'Toxic Childhood: how modern life is damaging our children... and what we can do about it' [Orion 2006, second edition 2015] was her first for a more general audience. It was followed by 'Detoxing Childhood' (Orion 2007), 21st Century Boys' (Orion 2009), '21st Century Girls' (Orion 2012), 'Upstart: the case for raising the school starting age and giving the under-sevens what they really need' (Floris 2016).

Since researching Toxic Childhood, she has become involved in campaigns relating to children's well-being and mental health. She was named among the top twenty most influential people in British education in the Evening Standard's 2008 Influentials list and has been listed in 'Who's Who' as a childhood campaigner since 2014.

She founded the Upstart Scotland campaign (www.upstart.scot), which was launched in 2016 and has since been its chair. Upstart makes the case for a relationship-centred, play-based kindergarten stage for children between the ages of three and seven.

== Letter to The Daily Telegraph ==
The Daily Telegraph published a letter she wrote with child specialist Richard House; signed by over a hundred experts, they call for a national debate on child education.

== Bibliography ==
- Palmer, Sue (2006). Toxic Childhood. London, UK: Orion. ISBN 0-7528-7359-8.
