= Colleen Thorburn-Smith =

Canadian softball player

Personal information
- Born: 19 August 1972 (age 53) Toronto, Ontario, Canada

Sport
- Sport: Softball

Colleen Thorburn-Smith (born 19 August 1972) is a Canadian softball player. She played for Kennesaw State University from 1992 to 1995. She also competed at the 1996 Summer Olympics and the 2000 Summer Olympics.
