= Karla Karch-Gailus =

Canadian basketball player

Karla Karch-Gailus (born 26 August 1964 in Vancouver, British Columbia) is a Canadian former basketball player who competed in the 1996 Summer Olympics and in the 2000 Summer Olympics.

== Awards and honors ==
=== University ===
- Top 100 U Sports women's basketball Players of the Century (1920-2020).
- 1986-87 CIS Championship Tournament All-Star
- 1986-87 Canada West Second Team All-Star
- 1987-88 CIS Second Team All-Canadian
- 1987-88 Canada West First Team All-Star
