= Debbie Sonnenberg =

Canadian softball player

Personal information
- Born: 4 January 1971 (age 54) Edmonton, Alberta, Canada

Sport
- Sport: Softball

Debbie Sonnenberg (born 4 January 1971) is a Canadian softball player. She competed in the women's tournament at the 1996 Summer Olympics.

Sonnenberg was born in 1971 to Karen and Leroy Sonnenberg and grew up in Leduc. She graduated from Huntingdon College in Montgomery, Alabama in 1994.

Sonnenberg started playing for Edmonton Jolane in junior categories.

Between 1991 and 1994, Sonnenberg played for the Huntingdon Hawks. She was a member of the NAIA All-American team in all of her four seasons in Alabama.

In 1992, Sonnenberg moved from Edmonton to Winnipeg to give herself a better chance of being selected for the 1996 Olympics, the first time a medal was on offer for softball. Canada finished fifth in the group stage, missing the medal round, with a 3–4 win–loss record.
