= Mark Clarke (sailor) =

Caymanian sailor

Personal information
- Nationality: Caymanian
- Born: 1 October 1950
- Died: 22 October 2013 (aged 63)

Sport
- Sport: Sailing

Mark Clarke (1 October 1950 – 22 October 2013) was a Caymanian sailor. He competed at the 1992 Summer Olympics and the 1996 Summer Olympics. In 2013, Clarke went missing off the Cayman Islands in his boat, and his body was never found.

== Athletics ==
Clarke sailed for the British territory at the Olympic Games in Barcelona in 1992 and Atlanta in 1996. He has also won numerous national championships.

== Death ==
Mark disappeared while on a solo fishing trip. He left Rackley's Canal in the North Sound area of the Caymans aboard his 25-foot boat “Badger.” The next day his empty boat was found wedged on a coral reef off Cayman Kai. The Joint Marine and Air Operations Units of the Royal Cayman Islands Police Service (RCIPS) and local civilians carried out a comprehensive search of the area where the empty boat was found, but no sign of Clarke was found.

Cayman Islands Olympic Committee President Donald McLean said the weather was "perfect" when Clarke disappeared.
