= Rochester Museum of Fine Arts =

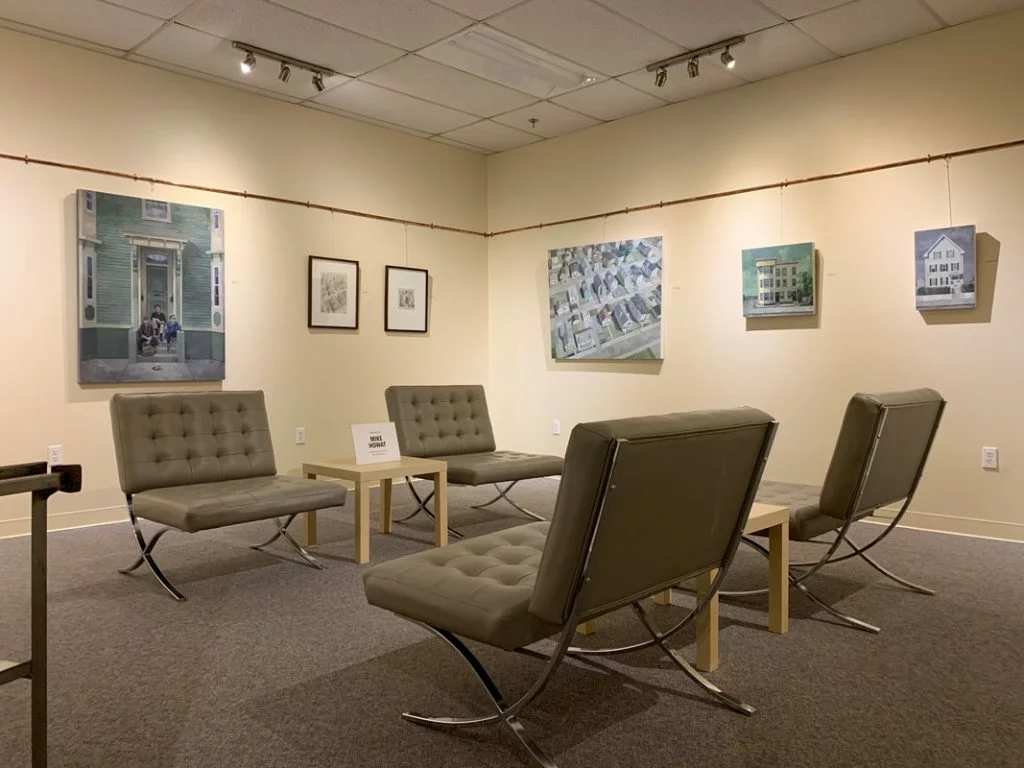
- The Bernier Room
- Location: 150 Wakefield Street, Rochester, New Hampshire, United States
- Type: Art museum
- Website: www.rochestermfa.org

The Rochester Museum of Fine Arts (RMFA) is an all-volunteer, community art initiative dedicated to the accessibility of contemporary works made by regionally, nationally, and internationally recognized artists. Founded in 2011, the RMFA works to enrich people’s lives through the presentation of fine art. The permanent collection and other rotating exhibitions are prominently displayed in the halls and Suite 135 of the James W. Foley Memorial Community Center and Rochester Public Library.

== Galleries ==
The permanent collection contains more than 200 donated, multidisciplinary works that represent a range of visual expression, including painting, sculpture, printmaking, drawing, photography, film, and more. The Mayor Harvey E. Bernier Room and Andrew Carnegie Gallery feature temporary art exhibits, made by emerging and seasoned artists. The Pixel Room showcases extraordinary and thought-provoking digital works on a 4K UHD LED display.

== Exhibitions ==
Notable past exhibitions have featured:

- Susan Kare, artist and graphic designer who contributed to the interface elements and typefaces for the first Apple Macintosh personal computer
- Eric Carle, author and illustrator of The Very Hungry Caterpillar
- Wayne White, painter, puppeteer, set designer for Pee Wee's Playhouse
- Robert Indiana, artist associated with the pop art movement, mostly known for creating the iconic image LOVE
- Bob Gruen, rock and roll photographer for John Lennon, Led Zeppelin, Sex Pistols, and many other major artists
- Sunday B. Morning, the screen printing company behind Andy Warhol's second Marilyn Monroe series
- The Picasso Estate Collection, a selection of original lithographs qualified by Pablo Picasso’s granddaughter, Marina Picasso
