= Michael Joseph (sailor) =

Caymanian sailor

Personal information
- Nationality: Caymanian
- Born: 6 August 1973 (age 51)

Sport
- Sport: Sailing

Michael Joseph (born 6 August 1973) is a Caymanian sailor. He competed in the Tornado event at the 1996 Summer Olympics.
