= Carmie Vairo =

Canadian softball player

Personal information
- Nationality: Canadian
- Born: 22 May 1968 (age 57) Vancouver, British Columbia, Canada

Sport
- Sport: Softball

Carmie Vairo (born 22 May 1968) is a Canadian softball player. She competed in the women's tournament at the 1996 Summer Olympics.
