= Ukraine at the 1996 Summer Olympics =

- IOC code: UKR
- NOC: National Olympic Committee of Ukraine
- Website: www.noc-ukr.org (in Ukrainian and English)

in Atlanta
- Competitors: 231 (146 men and 85 women) in 21 sports
- Flag bearer: Sergey Bubka
- Medals Ranked 9th: Gold 9 Silver 2 Bronze 12 Total 23

Summer Olympics appearances (overview)
- 1996; 2000; 2004; 2008; 2012; 2016; 2020; 2024

Other related appearances
- Austria (1896–1912); Hungary (1896–1912); Russian Empire (1900–1912); Czechoslovakia (1920–1936); Poland (1924–1936); Romania (1924–1936); Soviet Union (1952–1988); Unified Team (1992)

Ukraine competed in the Summer Olympic Games as an independent nation for the first time at the 1996 Summer Olympics in Atlanta, United States. Previously, Ukrainian athletes competed for the Unified Team at the 1992 Summer Olympics. 231 competitors, 146 men and 85 women, took part in 148 events in 21 sports.

As of 2024, this is Ukraine's best ever result in terms of gold medals and best result in terms of overall medals (the latter feat is shared with their 2000 team).

== Medalists ==
=== Gold ===
- Inessa Kravets — Athletics, Women's Triple Jump
- Wladimir Klitschko — Boxing, Men's Super Heavyweight
- Rustam Sharipov — Gymnastics, Men's Parallel Bars
- Lilia Podkopayeva — Gymnastics, Women's All-Around Individual
- Lilia Podkopayeva — Gymnastics, Women's Floor Exercises
- Kateryna Serebrianska — Gymnastics, Women's Rhythmic All-Around
- Yevhen Braslavets and Ihor Matviyenko — Sailing, Men's 470 Team Competition
- Timur Taymazov — Weightlifting, Men's Heavyweight (108 kg)
- Vyacheslav Oleynyk — Wrestling, Men's Greco-Roman 90 kg

=== Silver ===
- Lilia Podkopayeva — Gymnastics, Women's Balance Beam
- Inna Frolova, Svitlana Maziy, Dina Miftakhutdynova, and Olena Ronzhyna — Rowing, Women's Quadruple Sculls

=== Bronze ===
- Olena Sadovnycha — Archery, Women's Individual Competition
- Oleksandr Bahach — Athletics, Men's Shot Put
- Oleksandr Krykun — Athletics, Men's Hammer Throw
- Inha Babakova — Athletics, Women's High Jump
- Oleg Kiryukhin — Boxing, Men's Light Flyweight
- Ihor Korobchynskyi, Oleh Kosyak, Hrihoriy Misyutin, Volodymyr Shamenko, Rustam Sharipov, Oleksandr Svitlychniy, and Yuri Yermakov — Gymnastics, Men's Team Combined Exercises
- Olena Vitrychenko — Gymnastics, Women's Rhythmic All-Around
- Olena Pakholchik and Ruslana Taran — Sailing, Women's 470 Team Competition
- Denys Hotfrid — Weightlifting, Men's 99 kg
- Andriy Kalashnykov — Wrestling, Men's Greco-Roman Flyweight (52 kg)
- Elbrus Tedeyev — Wrestling, Men's Freestyle Featherweight (62 kg)
- Zaza Zazirov — Wrestling, Men's Freestyle Lightweight (68 kg)

== Archery ==
Men

Athlete	Event	Ranking round		Round of 64	Round of 32	Round of 16	Quarterfinals	Semifinals	Final / BM	
Athlete	Event	Score	Seed	Opposition Score	Opposition Score	Opposition Score	Opposition Score	Opposition Score	Opposition Score	Rank
Oleksandr Yatsenko	Men's individual	649	37	Samo Medved (SLO) (14); L 161-150	Did not advance					57
Valeriy Yevetsky	Men's individual	659	23	Wu Tsung-Yi (TPE) (44); W 159-156	Matteo Bisiani (ITA) (9); L 163-152	Did not advance				31
Stanislav Zabrodsky	Men's individual	664	16	Jubzhang Jubzhang (BHU) (48); W 156-156, 9-8	Tommi Tuovila (FIN) (32); W 163-142	Michele Frangilli (ITA) (6); L 170-160	Did not advance			13
Stanislav Zabrodsky; Valeriy Yevetsky; Oleksandr Yatsenko	Team	1972	4	—N/a		Canada (11); W 238-225	United States (3); L 251–240	Did not advance		7

Women

Athlete	Event	Ranking round		Round of 64	Round of 32	Round of 16	Quarterfinals	Semifinals	Final / BM	
Athlete	Event	Score	Seed	Opposition Score	Opposition Score	Opposition Score	Opposition Score	Opposition Score	Opposition Score	Rank
Natalya Bilukha	Women's individual	605	54	Lioudmila Arjannikova (NED) (11); L 149-141	Did not advance					55
Lina Herasymenko	Women's individual	673	1	Jennifer Mbuta (KEN) (64); W 156-126	Wang Xiaozhu (CHN) (32); L 156-152	Did not advance				23
Olena Sadovnycha	Women's individual	663	5	Ugyen Ugyen (BHU) (60); W 153-126	Katarzyna Klata (POL) (28); W 158-151	Joanna Nowicka (POL) (12); W 161-158	Kim Jo-Sun (KOR) (4); W 108-105	Kim Kyung-Wook (KOR) (8); L 111-109	Elif Altinkaynak (TUR) (6); W 109-102	Bronze medal
Olena Sadovnycha; Lina Herasymenko; Natalya Bilukha	Team	1941	4	—N/a		Indonesia (13); W 246-208	Poland (12); L 242–235	Did not advance		5

== Athletics ==
Key

- Note–Ranks given for track events are within the athlete's heat only
- Q = Qualified for the next round
- q = Qualified for the next round as a fastest loser or, in field events, by position without achieving the qualifying target
- NR = National record
- N/A = Round not applicable for the event
- Bye = Athlete not required to compete in round

Men
Track & road events

Athlete	Event	Heat		Quarterfinal		Semifinal		Final	
Athlete	Event	Result	Rank	Result	Rank	Result	Rank	Result	Rank
Petro Sarafyniuk	Marathon	—N/a						2:20.37	43
Vitaliy Popovych	50 km walk	—N/a						DNF	
Vladyslav Dolohodin	200 m	20.57	2 Q	20.65	6	Did not advance			
Serhiy Osovych	100 m	10.29	3 Q	10.38	7	Did not advance			
Kostyantyn Rurak	100 m	10.37	2 Q	10.47	7	Did not advance			
Andriy Bulkovskyi	1500 m	3:53.30	10	Did not advance					
Kostyantyn Rurak; Serhiy Osovych; Oleh Kramarenko; Vladyslav Dolohodin	4 × 100 m relay	38.90	1 Q	—N/a		38.56	3 Q	38.55	4

Field events

Athlete	Event	Qualification		Final	
Athlete	Event	Distance	Position	Distance	Position
Aleksandr Bagach	Shot put	20.23	5 Q	20.75	Bronze medal
Sergey Bubka	Pole vault	DNS		Did not advance	
Vasiliy Bubka	Pole vault	NM		Did not advance	
Oleksandr Klymenko	Shot put	19.45	10 q	NM	
Andriy Kokhanovskiy	Discus throw	57.90	28	Did not advance	
Volodymyr Kravchenko	Triple Jump	16.90	8 q	16.62	10
Oleksiy Krykun	Hammer throw	75.78	10 q	80.02	Bronze medal
Vitaliy Kyrylenko	Long jump	7.77	26	Did not advance	
Andriy Skvaruk	Hammer throw	77.48	6 Q	79.92	4
Vitaliy Sidorov	Discus throw	63.42	Q	63.78	7
Vyacheslav Tyrtyshnik	High jump	2.26	16	Did not advance	
Roman Virastyuk	Shot put	19.81	7 Q	20.45	6

Combined events – Decathlon

Athlete	Event	100	LJ	SP	HJ	400 m	110H	DT	PV	JT	1500 m	Final	Rank
Vitaliy Kolpakov	Result	11.15	7.53	14.33	2.07	48.12	14.30	45.66	4.80	53.58	5:05.41	8025	22
Vitaliy Kolpakov	Points	827	942	749	868	903	936	780	849	642	529	8025	22
Lev Lobodin	Result	10.85	7.35	15.57	1.95	48.96	DNF	—	—	—	—	DNF	
Lev Lobodin	Points	894	898	825	758	863	DNS	—	—	—	—	DNF	

Women
Track & road events

Athlete	Event	Heat		Quarterfinal		Semifinal		Final	
Athlete	Event	Result	Rank	Result	Rank	Result	Rank	Result	Rank
Nadiya Bodrova	100 m hurdles	13.22	5 q	DNF		Did not advance			
Nataliya Grygoryeva	100 m hurdles	13.16	6 q	12.96	6	Did not advance			
Viktoriya Fomenko	200 m	23.18	4 Q	23.44	8	Did not advance			
Lyubov Klochko	Marathon	—N/a						DNF	
Iana Manuylova	400 m	52,51	6 q	52.82	8	Did not advance			
Olena Ovcharova	100 m hurdles	13.23	5 q	13.16	8	Did not advance			
Zhanna Pintusevych	100 m	11.20	1 Q	11.14	2 Q	11.14	4 Q	11.14	8
Zhanna Pintusevych	200 m	23.15	4 Q	23.68	8	Did not advance			
Iryna Pukha	100 m	11.36	4 Q	11.42	6	Did not advance			
Tatyana Ragozina	10 km walk	—N/a						46:25	30
Olena Rurak	400 m	52.92	5	Did not advance					
Tetyana Tereshchuk	400 m hurdles	55.82	2 Q	—N/a		55.34	8	Did not advance	
Viktoriya Fomenko; Lyudmyla Koshchey; Yana Manuylova; Olha Moroz	4 × 400 m relay	3:28.16	5	Did not advance					

Field events

Athlete	Event	Qualification		Final	
Athlete	Event	Distance	Position	Distance	Position
Olena Antonova	Discus throw	57.92	29	Did not advance	
Inha Babakova	High jump	1.93	1 Q	2.01	Bronze medal
Iryna Chekhovtsova	Long jump	6.70	5 Q	6.97	5
Valentyna Fedyushyna	Shot put	19.22	4 Q	17.99	12
Olena Hovorova	Triple jump	14.60	2 Q	14.09	10
Olena Khlusovych	Triple jump	14.38	5 Q	13.81	12
Inessa Kravets	Long jump	NM		Did not advance	
Inessa Kravets	Triple jump	14.57	2 Q	15.33	Gold medal
Vita Pavlysh	Shot put	19.04	6 Q	19.30	4
Vita Styopina	High jump	1.85	19	Did not advance	
Viktoriya Vershynina	Long jump	NM		Did not advance	

== Badminton ==
Athlete	Event	Round of 64	Round of 32	Round of 16	Quarterfinal	Semifinal	Final / BM	
Athlete	Event	Opposition Score	Opposition Score	Opposition Score	Opposition Score	Opposition Score	Opposition Score	Rank
Vladislav Druzchenko	Men's singles	BYE	Poul-Erik Høyer Larsen (DEN); L 7–15, 6-15	Did not advance				
Elena Nosdran	Women's singles	Zarinah Abdullah (SIN); L 3–11, 0-11	Did not advance					
Victoria Evtoushenko; Elena Nosdran	Women's singles	—N/a	Chen Ying; Peng Xingyong (CHN); L 2–15, 15–11, 1-15	Did not advance				
Victoria Evtoushenko; Vladislav Druzchenko	Mixed doubles	—N/a	Michael Sogaard; Rikke Olsen (DEN); L 5–15, 5-15	Did not advance				

== Basketball ==
=== Women's tournament ===
Team roster

The following players represented Ukraine:

- Ruslana Kyrychenko
- Viktoriya Burenok
- Olena Zhyrko
- Maryna Tkachenko
- Liudmyla Nazarenko
- Olena Oberemko
- Viktoriya Paradiz
- Viktoriya Leleka
- Oksana Dovhaliuk
- Diana Sadovnykova
- Nataliya Silianova
- Olha Shliakhova

Preliminary round

The four best teams from each group advanced to the quarterfinal round.

Pos	Team	Pld	W	L	PF	PA	PD	Pts	Qualification
1	United States (H)	5	5	0	507	339	+168	10	Quarterfinals
2	Ukraine	5	3	2	354	358	−4	8 (Note: Head-to-head record: Ukraine 1–0 Australia)	Quarterfinals
3	Australia	5	3	2	369	319	+50	8	Quarterfinals
4	Cuba	5	2	3	365	377	−12	7 (Note: Head-to-head record: Cuba 1–0 South Korea)	Quarterfinals
5	South Korea	5	2	3	347	389	−42	7	
6	Zaire	5	0	5	287	447	−160	5	

Source: FIBA archive
Rules for classification: 1) points; 2) head-to-head points; 3) head-to-head goal average; 4) head-to-head number of points scored.
(H) Hosts
Notes:

21 July 1996

Boxscore

Zaire	65–81	Ukraine
Pts: Mabika 14; Rebs: Ngalula, Tshijuka 7 Asts: Kamanga 4		Pts: Tkachenko 27; Rebs: Nazareko 9 Asts: Tkachenko, Zhyrko 5

Morehouse College Gymnasium, Atlanta

23 July 1996

Boxscore

Ukraine	65–98	United States
Pts: Nazarenko 14; Rebs: Shliakhova 5 Asts: four players 2		Pts: Bolton 21; Rebs: Leslie 9 Asts: Swoopes 7

Morehouse College Gymnasium, Atlanta

25 July 1996

Boxscore

South Korea	72–67	Ukraine
Pts: Yoo Y-j, Chun E-s 14; Rebs: Jung S-m 7 Asts: Chun E-s, Chun J-w 5		Pts: Tkachenko 21; Rebs: Tkachenko 11; Asts: Zhyrko 8

Morehouse College Gymnasium, Atlanta

27 July 1996

Boxscore

Ukraine	87–75	Cuba
Pts: Zhyrko 22; Rebs: Nazarenko 8 Asts: Tkachenko 6		Pts: Martínez 20; Rebs: Martínez 12; Asts: three players 3

Morehouse College Gymnasium, Atlanta

29 July 1996

Boxscore

Ukraine	54–48	Australia
Pts: Dovhaliuk 15; Rebs: Nazarenko 15; Asts: Tkachenko, Burenok 3		Pts: Timms 13; Rebs: Sporn 10; Asts: Timms 3

Morehouse College Gymnasium, Atlanta

Quarterfinals

31 July 1996
20:00

Boxscore

Ukraine	59–50	Italy
Scoring by half: 25–22, 34–28
Pts: Nazarenko 16; Rebs: Zhyrko 15; Asts: Tkachenko 6		Pts: Pollini 13; Rebs: Pollini 8 Asts: Pollini, Fullin 3

Georgia Dome, Atlanta

Semifinals

2 August 1996
15:00

Boxscore

Brazil	81–60	Ukraine
Scoring by half: 48–36, 33–24
Pts: Paula 24; Rebs: Alessandra 13; Asts: Paula 6		Pts: Zhyrko 15; Rebs: Sadovnykova 6 Asts: Tkachenko 5

Georgia Dome, Atlanta

Bronze medal match

4 August 1996
16:00

Boxscore

Ukraine	56–66	Australia
Scoring by half: 24–33, 32–33
Pts: Zhyrko 16; Rebs: Zhyrko 9 Asts: Zhyrko, Nazarenko 3		Pts: Brogan 19; Rebs: Brogan 12; Asts: Timms 4

Georgia Dome, Atlanta

== Boxing ==
Men

Athlete	Event	Round of 32	Round of 16	Quarterfinals	Semifinals	Final	
Athlete	Event	Opposition Result	Opposition Result	Opposition Result	Opposition Result	Opposition Result	Rank
Oleg Kiryukhin	Light Flyweight	Abdul Rashid Qambrani (PAK); W 17-3	Beibis Mendoza (COL); W 18-6	Albert Guardado (USA); W 19-14	Daniel Petrov (BUL); L 8-17	Did not advance	Bronze medal
Serhiy Kovganko	Flyweight	Darwin Angeles (HON); W 12-6	Bulat Jumadilov (KAZ); L 4-21	Did not advance			
Yevheniy Shestakov	Featherweight	Serafim Todorov (BUL); L 4-11	Did not advance				
Sergiy Dzindziruk	Welterweight	Parkpoom Jangphonak (THA); W 20-10	Hasan Al (DEN); L 4-10	Did not advance			
Serhiy Horodnichov	Light Middleweight	Albert Eromosele (NIG); W 18-4	Alfredo Duvergel (CUB); L 2-15	Did not advance			
Rostyslav Zaulychnyi	Light heavyweight	Timur Ibragimov (UZB); L 3-7	Did not advance				
Wladimir Klitschko	Super heavyweight	BYE	Lawrence Clay-Bey (USA); W 10-8	Attila Levin (SWE); W TKO-1	Alexei Lezin (RUS); W 4-1	Paea Wolfgramm (TON); W 7-3	Gold medal

== Canoeing ==
=== Sprint ===
Men

Athlete	Event	Heats		Repechage		Semifinals		Final	
Athlete	Event	Time	Rank	Time	Rank	Time	Rank	Time	Rank
Michał Śliwiński	C-1 500 m	1:54.283	4 QS	—N/a		1:52.093	1 QF	1:51.714	4
Roman Bundz	C-1 1000 m	4:26.555	2 QF	—N/a		BYE		4:02.078	7
Vladyslav Tereshchenko	K-1 500 m	1:45.623	7 QR	1:44.143	5 QS	1:41.883	6	Did not advance	
Vladyslav Tereshchenko	K-1 1000 m	3:51.772	5 QR	4:08.681	4 QS	3:55.649	9	Did not advance	
Oleksandr Lytvynenko; Oleksiy Ihriaev	C-2 500 m	1:46.652	2 QS	BYE		1:51.010	9	Did not advance	
Oleksandr Lytvynenko; Oleksiy Ihriaev	C-2 1000 m	4:13.363	6 QS	—N/a		3:46.845	3	Did not advance	
V'iacheslav Kulida; Olesksiy Slivinsky; Andriy Borzukov; Andriy Petrov	K-4 1000 m	3:16.297	6 QS	BYE		3:05.643	4	Did not advance	

Women

Athlete	Event	Heats		Repechage		Semifinals		Final	
Athlete	Event	Time	Rank	Time	Rank	Time	Rank	Time	Rank
Hanna Balabanova; Kateryna Yurchenko	K-2 500 m	1:48.436	4 QR	1:54.373	3 QS	1:48.857	7	Did not advance	
Hanna Balabanova; Nataliya Feklisova; Tetyana Teklyan; Kateryna Yurchenko	K-4 500 m	1:43.381	6 QS	BYE		1:40.092	4	Did not advance	

Qualification Legend: 'R = Qualify to repechage; QS = Qualify to semi-final; QF = Qualify directly to final

== Cycling ==
=== Road ===
Men

Athlete	Event	Time	Rank
Serhiy Ushakov	Road race	04:56:25	14
Andrei Tchmil	Road race	04:56:44	33
Oleh Pankov	Road race	04:56:45	43
Mykhaylo Khalilov	Road race	Did not finish	
Volodymyr Pulnikov	Road race	Did not finish	

Women

Athlete	Event	Time	Rank
Natalya Kishchuk	Road race	02:37:06	30

=== Track ===
1000m time trial

Athlete	Event	Time	Rank
Bogdan Bondariew	Men's 1000m time trial	1:05.658	11

Individual Pursuit

Athlete	Event	Qualifying round		Quarter-finals	Semi-finals	Finals	
Athlete	Event	Time	Rank	Opposition Time	Opposition Time	Opposition Time	Rank
Andriy Yatsenko	Men's Individual pursuit	4:30.751	8 Q	Andrea Collinelli (ITA); L OVT	Did not advance		8
Bogdan Bondariew; Oleksandr Fedenko; Andriy Yatsenko; Alexander Simonenko	Men's team pursuit	4:11.545	4 Q	Russia (RUS); L 4:12.794	Did not advance		7

Points race

Athlete	Event	Points	Laps	Rank
Vasyl Yakovlev	Men's points race	24	1	4

== Diving ==
Men

Athlete	Event	Preliminaries		Semifinal				Final			
Athlete	Event	Points	Rank	Points	Rank	Total	Rank	Points	Rank	Total	Rank
Maksym Lapyn	3 m springboard	328.23	23	Did not advance							
Oleh Yanchenko	10 m platform	301.92	26	Did not advance							
Roman Volod'kov	3 m springboard	359.85	12	210.30	10	570.15	12	382.83	10	593.13	11
Roman Volod'kov	10 m platform	335.97	20	Did not advance							

Women

Athlete	Event	Preliminaries		Semifinal				Final			
Athlete	Event	Points	Rank	Points	Rank	Total	Rank	Points	Rank	Total	Rank
Iryna Pissareva	3 m springboard	269.43	10	211.23	7	480.66	9	236.79	12	448.02	12
Svitlana Serbina	10m platform	244.05	18	165.06	7	409.11	14	Did not advance			
Olena Zhupina	3 m springboard	286.47	3	209.55	10	496.02	5	297.72	2	507.27	5
Olena Zhupina	10m platform	280.11	7	171.24	4	451.35	6	265.77	7	437.01	6

== Fencing ==
Six fencers, four men and two women, represented Ukraine in 1996.

Men

Athlete	Event	Round of 64	Round of 32	Round of 16	Quarterfinal	Semifinal	Final / BM	
Athlete	Event	Opposition Score	Opposition Score	Opposition Score	Opposition Score	Opposition Score	Opposition Score	Rank
Oleksiy Bryzhalov	Individual foil	Cliff Bayer (USA); W 15-11	Alessandro Puccini (ITA); L 12-15	Did not advance				31
Serhiy Holubytskiy	Individual foil	BYE	Kim Yong-Guk (KOR); W 15-4	Ye Chong (CHN); W 15-14	Lionel Plumenail (FRA); L 13-15	Did not advance		6
Vadym Huttsait	Individual sabre	BYE	Raúl Peinador (ESP); W 15-13	Luigi Tarantino (ITA); W 15-9	Stanislav Pozdnyakov (RUS); L 14-15	Did not advance		6
Volodymyr Kaliuzhniy	Individual sabre	Elxan Məmmədov (AZE); W 15-5	Damien Touya (FRA); L 11-15	Did not advance				24

Women

Athlete	Event	Round of 64	Round of 32	Round of 16	Quarterfinal	Semifinal	Final / BM	
Athlete	Event	Opposition Score	Opposition Score	Opposition Score	Opposition Score	Opposition Score	Opposition Score	Rank
Viktoriya Titova	Individual epee	BYE	Joanna Jakimiuk (POL); W 15-4	Laura Flessel-Colovic (FRA); L 11-15	Did not advance			13
Yeva Vybornova	Individual epee	Mariette Schmit (LUX); W 15-8	Eva-Maria Ittner (GER); L 7-15	Did not advance				23

== Gymnastics ==
Men

The Ukraine alternates were Boris Zelepoukin, and Vladmir Portnko. Boris Zelepoukin was almost brought in because of Grigory Mistuin not performing up to standards.

Team
Individual finals

Athlete	Event	Apparatus						Total	Rank
Athlete	Event	F	PH	R	V	PB	HB	Total	Rank
Igor Korobchinski	Vault	—N/a			19.350	—N/a		9.568	7
Igor Korobchinski	All-around	9.450	9.625	9.462	9.512	9.675	9.487	57.211	15
Grigory Misutin	Floor	19.362	—N/a					9.100	8
Rustam Sharipov	Parallel bars	—N/a				19.200	—N/a	9.837	Gold medal
Rustam Sharipov	All-around	9.625	9.637	9.650	9.400	9.750	9.650	57.712	8
Oleksandr Svetlichny	All-around	9.650	9.587	9.662	9.537	9.625	9.637	57.698	9

Women

The Women alternates were Oksana Knizhnik and Irina Bulakova. Oksana Knizhnik was brought in after Viktoriya Karpenko was out due to a Wrist Injury.

Team
Individual finals

Athlete	Event	Apparatus				Total	Rank
Athlete	Event	V	UB	BB	F	Total	Rank
Lilia Podkopayeva	All-around	9.781	9.800	9.787	9.887	39.255	Gold medal
Lilia Podkopayeva	Uneven bars	—N/a	19.662	—N/a		9.787	5
Lilia Podkopayeva	Balance beam	—N/a		19.500	—N/a	9.825	Silver medal
Lilia Podkopayeva	Floor	—N/a	19.612	—N/a		9.887	Gold medal
Lioubov Sheremeta	All-around	9.468	9.637	9.587	9.512	38.204	22
Olga Teslenko	Balance beam	—N/a		19.175	—N/a	9.625	5
Svetlana Zelepukina	All-around	9.512	9.650	9.325	9.537	38.024	23

== Judo ==
Men

Athlete	Event	Preliminary	Round of 32	Round of 16	Quarterfinals	Semifinals	Repechage 1	Repechage 2	Repechage 3	Final / BM	
Athlete	Event	Opposition Result	Opposition Result	Opposition Result	Opposition Result	Opposition Result	Opposition Result	Opposition Result	Opposition Result	Opposition Result	Rank
Karen Balayan	−78 kg	BYE	Jason Morris (USA); L 0000-0100	Did not advance							21
Ruslan Mashurenko	−86 kg	BYE	Steve Murray (AHO); W 1000-0000	Adrian Croitoru (ROU); L 0000-1000	Did not advance		Hidehiko Yoshida (JPN); L 0000-1000	Did not advance			13

Women

Athlete	Event	Round of 32	Round of 16	Quarterfinals	Semifinals	Repechage 1	Repechage 2	Repechage 3	Final / BM	
Athlete	Event	Opposition Result	Opposition Result	Opposition Result	Opposition Result	Opposition Result	Opposition Result	Opposition Result	Opposition Result	Rank
Tatyana Belyaeva	72 kg	Marie Michelle St Louis (MRI); W 1000–0000	Simona Richter (ROU); W 1000–0000	Ylenia Scapin (ITA); W 1000–0000	Ulla Werbrouck (BEL); L 0000–1000	BYE			Diadenis Luna (CUB); L 0000–0010	5

== Modern pentathlon ==
Men

Athlete	Event	Shooting (10 m air pistol)			Swimming (200 m freestyle)			Fencing (épée one touch)			Riding (show jumping)			Running (3000 m)			Total points	Final rank
Athlete	Event	Points	Rank	MP points	Time	Rank	MP points	Wins	Rank	MP points	Penalties	Rank	MP points	Time	Rank	MP points	Total points	Final rank
Heorhiy Chymerys	Men's	173	20	1012	3:19.60	11	1276	21	1	970	210	26	890	14:13.044	27	1006	5154	24

== Rhythmic gymnastics ==
Women

Athlete	Event	Qualification						Final					
Athlete	Event	Hoop	Ball	Clubs	Ribbon	Total	Rank	Hoop	Ball	Clubs	Ribbon	Total	Rank
Ekaterina Serebrianskaya	Individual	9.799	9.783	9.832	9.699	39.113	2 Q	9.950	9.950	9.950	9.833	39.683	Gold medal
Olena Vitrichenko	Individual	9.800	9.800	9.800	9.800	39.200	1 Q	9.866	9.800	9.849	9.816	39.331	Bronze medal

== Rowing ==
Men

Athlete	Event	Heats		Repechage		Semifinals		Final	
Athlete	Event	Time	Rank	Time	Rank	Time	Rank	Time	Rank
Oleksandr Khimich	Single sculls	7:57.05	4 R	7:56.15	3	7:31.24	4 FD	7:40.54	19
Oleksandr Marchenko; Oleksandr Zaskalko; Mykola Chupryna; Leonid Shaposhnykov	Quadruple sculls	6:13.04	4 R	5:51.51	2 SA/B	6:05.65	5 FB	5:53.46	7
Yevhen Sharonin; Roman Hrynevych; Vitaliy Raievskiy; Valeriy Samara; Oleh Lykov; Ihor Martynenko; Ihor Mohylniy; Oleksandr Kapustin; Hryhoriy Dmytrenko	Eight	5:55.32	5 R	5:42.43	4 FB	BYE		5:44.89	10

Women

Athlete	Event	Heats		Repechage		Semifinals		Final	
Athlete	Event	Time	Rank	Time	Rank	Time	Rank	Time	Rank
Tetiana Ustiuzhanina; Olena Reutova	Double sculls	7:27.12	3 Q	BYE		7:28.53	5 FB	6:53.96	8
Olena Ronzhyna; Inna Frolova; Svitlana Maziy; Dina Miftakhutdynova	Quadruple sculls	6:46.17	4 R	6:19.11	1 FA	BYE		6:30.36	Silver medal

== Sailing ==
Men

Athlete	Event	Race											Net points	Final rank
Athlete	Event	1	2	3	4	5	6	7	8	9	10	11	Net points	Final rank
Maksym Oberemko	Mistral	20	~~31~~	21	17	26	~~38~~	12	30	24	—N/a		150.0	25
Yuriy Tokovyy	Finn	2	~~20~~	~~22~~	14	16	5	17	9	10	18	—N/a	91.0	17
Yevhen Braslavets; Ihor Matviyenko	470	2	2	3	1	~~16~~	5	1	9	10	7	~~DNC~~	40.0	Gold medal

Women

Athlete	Event	Race											Net points	Final rank
Athlete	Event	1	2	3	4	5	6	7	8	9	10	11	Net points	Final rank
Ruslana Taran; Olena Pakholchik	470	1	5	4	9	~~12~~	8	~~18~~	1	4	4	2	38.0	Bronze medal

Open

Athlete	Event	Race											Net points	Final rank
Athlete	Event	1	2	3	4	5	6	7	8	9	10	11	Net points	Final rank
Rodion Luka	Laser	27	34	43	37	~~44~~	34	3	23	36	37	~~DSQ~~	274.0	35
Serhiy Pryymak; Yevhen Chelombitko	Tornado	6	13	14	15	15	13	13	~~17~~	14	15	~~18~~	118.0	17
Serhiy Pichuhin; Serhiy Khaindrava; Volodymyr Korotkov	Soling	~~DSQ~~	3	1	15	6	18	18	5	9	2	—N/a	59.0	7

M = Medal race; EL = Eliminated – did not advance into the medal race; CAN = Race cancelled

== Shooting ==
Men

Athlete	Event	Qualification		Final	
Athlete	Event	Score	Rank	Score	Rank
Ghennadi Avramenko	10 m running target	563	15	Did not advance	
Oleksandr Bliznyuchenko	10 m air pistol	577	19	Did not advance	
Oleksandr Bliznyuchenko	50 m pistol	555	25	Did not advance	
Yevhen Hekht	10 m running target	563	15	Did not advance	
Myroslav Ihnatyuk	25 m rapid fire pistol	586	9	Did not advance	
Viktor Makarov	10 m air pistol	579	12	Did not advance	
Viktor Makarov	50 m pistol	556	20	Did not advance	
Dmytro Monakov	Trap	115	45	Did not advance	
Oleg Mykhaylov	10 m air rifle	582	32	Did not advance	
Oleg Mykhaylov	50 m rifle prone	595	11	Did not advance	
Oleg Mykhaylov	50 m rifle three positions	1161	26	Did not advance	

Women

Athlete	Event	Qualification		Final	
Athlete	Event	Score	Rank	Score	Rank
Lessia Leskiv	50 m rifle three positions	579	9	Did not advance	
Lessia Leskiv	10 m air rifle	394	7 Q	494.2	8
Tetyana Nesterova	50 m rifle three positions	581	8 Q	673.3	8
Tetyana Nesterova	10 m air rifle	388	29	Did not advance	

== Swimming ==
Men

Athlete	Event	Heat		Final B		Final	
Athlete	Event	Time	Rank	Time	Rank	Time	Rank
Alexander Dzhaburiya	100 metre breaststroke	1:02.70	13 Q	1:02.91	13	Did not advance	
Dimitri Ivanusa	200 metre breaststroke	2:17.54	21	Did not advance			
Pavel Khnykin	50 metre freestyle	22.91	17	Did not advance			
Pavel Khnykin	100 metre freestyle	49.69	6 Q	—N/a		49.65	6
Pavel Khnykin	100 metre butterfly	53.25	3 Q	—N/a		53.58	8
Volodymyr Nikolaychuk	100 m backstroke	56.71	19	Did not advance			
Sergei Sergeyev	200 metre individual medley	2:06.30	23	Did not advance			
Igor Snitko	400 metre freestyle	3:55.67	15 Q	3:54.63	12	Did not advance	
Igor Snitko	1500 metre freestyle	15:31.40	15	Did not advance			
Denys Sylantyev	100 m butterfly	54.33	18	Did not advance			
Denys Sylantyev	200 m butterfly	1:58.04	2 Q	—N/a		1:58.37	6
Rostislav Svanidze	100 metre freestyle	50.31	16 Q	50.43	14	Did not advance	
Yuriy Vlasov	50 metre freestyle	22.77	12 Q	22.82	11	Did not advance	
Denys Zavhorodnyy	200 metre freestyle	1:58.67	42	Did not advance			
Denys Zavhorodnyy	1500 metre freestyle	15:46.79	24	Did not advance			
Volodymyr Nikolaychuk; Oleksandr Dzhaburiya; Denys Sylantyev; Pavel Khnykin	4 × 100 m medley relay	3:42.29	9	Did not advance			

Women

Athlete	Event	Heat		Final B		Final	
Athlete	Event	Time	Rank	Time	Rank	Time	Rank
Svitlana Bondarenko	100 metre breaststroke	1:09.79	7 Q	—N/a		1:09.21	4
Svitlana Bondarenko	200 metre breaststroke	2:32.42	16 Q	DNS		Did not advance	
Elena Lapunova	200 metre freestyle	2:04.07	21	Did not advance			
Elena Lapunova	200 metre individual medley	2:20.76	29	Did not advance			
Natalia Zolotukhina	100 metre butterfly	1:02.18	20	Did not advance			
Natalia Zolotukhina	200 metre butterfly	2:16.68	20	Did not advance			

== Tennis ==
Women's doubles

Olga Lugina and Natalia Medvedeva were scheduled to play in the women's doubles event but they withdrew. Their opponents in the first round would have been Manon Bollegraf and Brenda Schultz-McCarthy from the Netherlands.

== Volleyball ==
Women

=== Preliminary round ===
==== Group A ====
	Team	Points	G	W	L	PW	PL	Ratio	SW	SL	Ratio
1.	China	10	5	5	0	256	181	1.414	15	3	5.000
2.	United States	9	5	4	1	241	198	1.217	13	5	2.600
3.	Netherlands	8	5	3	2	211	179	1.179	10	7	1.429
4.	South Korea	7	5	2	3	249	222	1.122	10	9	1.111
5.	Japan	6	5	1	4	158	199	0.794	3	12	0.250
6.	Ukraine	5	5	0	5	89	225	0.396	0	15	0.000

- Saturday 1996-07-20

United States	3–0	Ukraine	(15- 8 15- 5 15–11)

- Monday 1996-07-22

Japan	3–0	Ukraine	(15- 9 15- 5 15- 4)

- Wednesday 1996-07-24

South Korea	3–0	Ukraine	(15- 3 15-10 15- 7)

- Friday 1996-07-26

China	3–0	Ukraine	(15- 4 15- 4 15- 6)

- Sunday 1996-07-28

Netherlands	3–0	Ukraine	(15- 3 15- 5 15- 5)

- Team roster

- Nataliya Bozhenova
- Yuliya Buyeva
- Olexandra Fomina
- Tetyana Ivanyushkyna
- Olga Kolomiyets
- Alla Kravets
- Olena Kryvonossova
- Vita Mateshik
- Regina Mylosserdova
- Olga Pavlova
- Mariya Polyakova
- Olena Sydorenko

- Head coach: Gariy Iegiazarov

== Water polo ==
Men

=== Group B ===
	Team	Points	G	W	D	L	GF	GA	Diff
1.	Italy	10	5	5	0	0	48	38	+10
2.	United States	8	5	4	0	1	45	37	+8
3.	Croatia	6	5	3	0	2	51	39	+12
4.	Greece	4	5	2	0	3	37	38	–1
5.	Romania	1	5	0	1	4	31	45	–14
6.	Ukraine	1	5	0	1	4	33	48	–15

- Saturday July 20, 1996

Romania	6 – 6	Ukraine

- Sunday July 21, 1996

Italy	8 – 6	Ukraine

- Monday July 22, 1996

United States	9 – 7	Ukraine

- Tuesday July 23, 1996

Croatia	16 – 8	Ukraine

- Wednesday July 24, 1996

Greece	9 – 6	Ukraine

=== Classification round ===
	Team	Points	G	W	D	L	GF	GA	Diff
9.	Germany	6	3	3	0	0	29	16	+13
10.	Netherlands	3	3	1	1	1	25	26	–1
11.	Romania	2	3	1	0	2	25	28	–3
12.	Ukraine	1	3	0	1	2	21	30	–9

- Friday July 26, 1996

Germany	10 – 4	Ukraine

- Saturday July 27, 1996

Romania	11 – 8	Ukraine

- Sunday July 28, 1996

Netherlands	9 – 9	Ukraine

- Team roster

- Andriy Kovalenko
- Dmytro Andreyev
- Ihor Horbach
- Vadym Kebalo
- Vitaliy Khalchaytsky
- Vyacheslav Kostanda
- Oleksandr Potulnytsky
- Vadym Rozhdestvensky
- Vadym Skuratov
- Anatoliy Solodun
- Dmytro Stratan
- Oleh Vladymyrov
- Oleksiy Yegorov

== Weightlifting ==
Men

Athlete	Event	Snatch		Clean & jerk		Total	Rank
Athlete	Event	Result	Rank	Result	Rank	Total	Rank
Oleksiy Khizhniak	−70 kg	142.5	17	177.5	14	320.0	15
Oleksandr Blyshchyk	−83 kg	167.5	5	NM	DNF	167.5	DNF
Oleh Chumak	−91 kg	167.5	8	212.5	4	380.0	7
Denys Gotfrid	−99 kg	187.5	2	215.0	3	402.5	Bronze medal
Stanislav Rybalchenko	−99 kg	182.5	4	212.5	6	395.0	4
Timur Taymazov	−108 kg	195.0	2	235.0	1	430.0	Gold medal
Ihor Razoronov	−108 kg	NM	DNF	—	—	NM	DNF

== Wrestling ==
Freestyle

Athlete	Event	Round 1	Round 2	Round 3	Round 4	Round 5	Round 6	Final / BM / CF	
Athlete	Event	Opposition Result	Opposition Result	Opposition Result	Opposition Result	Opposition Result	Opposition Result	Opposition Result	Rank
Viktor Yefteni	−48 kg	Orujov (RUS); W 6-4	Il (PRK); L 0-3	Sergelenbaatar (MGL); W 5-1	Vila (CUB); L 0-8	Did not advance			10
Vladimir Toguzov	−52 kg	Kedjaouer (ALG); W 10-0	Mamyrov (KAZ); L 1-3	Mongush (RUS); L 1-2	Did not advance				10
Aslanbek Fidarov	−57 kg	Zakhartdinov (UZB); L 3-5	Abdullayev (AZE); L 0-11	Did not advance					18
Elbrus Tedeyev	−62 kg	du Plessis (RSA); W 5-1	Demeter (HUN); W 11-1	Jae-sung (KOR); L 1-3	Bye	Islamov (UZB); W 5-4	Schillaci (ITA); W 10-3	Wada (JPN); W 3-1	Bronze medal
Zaza Zazirov	−68 kg	Oziti (NGR); W 10-0	Kõiv (EST); W 5-0	Bogiev (RUS); L 4-6	Gogol (BLR); W 6-1	Bye	Sang-ho (KOR); W 7-0 Fall	Sánchez (CUB); W 8-6	Bronze medal
Serhiy Hubrynyuk	−82 kg	Rosa (PUR); W 3-1	Gutches (USA); L 0-4	Zhabrailov (MDA); L 0-3	Did not advance				16
Dzhambolat Tedeyev	−90 kg	Kostecki (POL); W 5-4	Balz (GER); W 4-1	Bye	Khadem (IRI); L 0-3	Bye	Kurtanidze (GEO); L 4-10	Kodei (NGR); W 12-0 Fall	5
Sagid Murtazaliev	−100 kg	Bye	Sabejew (GER); W 13-3	Angle (USA); L 4-3	Ladik (CAN); W 4-1	Kovalevsky (BLR); L 4-8	Bye	Ladik (CAN); W 3-1	7
Mirabi Valiyev	−130 kg	Demir (TUR); L 1-1 (1-3 PP)	Bye	Singh (GBR); W 4-0	Aigang (CHN); W 3-1	Kovalevsky (KGZ); L 1-3	Bye	Bourdoulis (GRE); W 5-1	7

Greco-Roman

Athlete	Event	Round 1	Round 2	Round 3	Round 4	Round 5	Round 6	Final / BM / CF	
Athlete	Event	Opposition Result	Opposition Result	Opposition Result	Opposition Result	Opposition Result	Opposition Result	Opposition Result	Rank
Andriy Kalashnykov	−52 kg	Nazaryan (ARM); L 0-10	Yadav (IND); W 11-0	Rebegea (ROU); W 3-1	Ter-Mkrtchyan (GER); W 3-0 Fall	Jabłoński (POL); W 8-5	Anev (BUL); W 5-0	Danielyan (RUS); W 4-1	Bronze medal
Ruslan Khakymov	−57 kg	Šukevičius (LTU); W 5-1	Manukyan (ARM); W 11-0	Melnichenko (KAZ); L 1-8	Jansons (LAT); W 9-4	Bye	Yıldız (GER); W 3-2	Zetian (CHN); L 4-0	4
Hrihoriy Kamyshenko	−62 kg	Santos (VEN); W 10-0	Manukyan (ARM); W 3-2	Bye	Zawadzki (POL); L 2-8	Bye	Pirim (TUR); L 1-2	Ivanov (BUL); L 0-3	6
Rustam Adzhi	−68 kg	Yli-Hannuksela (FIN); L 2-6	Young-il (KOR); W 2-1	Tretyakov (RUS); L 1-3	Did not advance				13
Artur Dzyhasov	−74 kg	Avluca (TUR); W 3-0	Hahn (GER); W 2-1	Bye	Asell (FIN); L 0-10	Bye	Tracz (POL); L 1-3	Iskandaryan (RUS); L WO	DQ
Vyacheslav Oliynyk	−90 kg	Hodžić (BIH); W 12-0	Matviyenko (KAZ); W 4-0	Bullmann (GER); W 4-2	Başar (TUR); W 3-0	Bye	Bye	Fafiński (POL); W 3-0	Gold medal
Georgiy Saldadze	−100 kg	Giraldo (COL); W 4-0 Fall	Edisherashvili (RUS); W 6-3	Ljungberg (SWE); L 0-5 Fall	Grabovetchi (MDA); L 2-2 (1-3 PP)	Bye	Bye	Manov (BUL); W WO	7
Petro Kotok	−130 kg	Dgvareli (TJK); W 5-0	Ghaffari (USA); L 0-3	Kékes (HUN); W 4-0	Ahokas (FIN); W 2-0	Bye	Poikilidis (GRE); W 3-1	Mureiko (MDA); L 0-1	4
