= Italy at the 1996 Summer Olympics =

- IOC code: ITA
- NOC: Italian National Olympic Committee
- Website: www.coni.it (in Italian)

in Atlanta
- Competitors: 340 (236 men, 104 women) in 27 sports
- Flag bearer: Giovanna Trillini
- Medals Ranked 6th: Gold 13 Silver 10 Bronze 12 Total 35

Summer Olympics appearances (overview)
- 1896; 1900; 1904; 1908; 1912; 1920; 1924; 1928; 1932; 1936; 1948; 1952; 1956; 1960; 1964; 1968; 1972; 1976; 1980; 1984; 1988; 1992; 1996; 2000; 2004; 2008; 2012; 2016; 2020; 2024

Other related appearances
- 1906 Intercalated Games

Italy competed at the 1996 Summer Olympics in Atlanta, United States. 340 competitors, 236 men and 104 women, took part in 172 events in 27 sports.

== Medalists ==
=== Gold ===
- Antonio Rossi — Canoeing, Men's K1 500 metres Kayak Singles
- Antonio Rossi and Daniele Scarpa — Canoeing, Men's K2 1.000 metres Kayak Pairs
- Andrea Collinelli — Cycling, Men's 4.000 metres Individual Pursuit
- Silvio Martinello — Cycling, Men's Points Race
- Antonella Bellutti — Cycling, Women's Individual Pursuit
- Paola Pezzo — Cycling, Women's Cross-country Mountainbike
- Alessandro Puccini — Fencing, Men's Foil Individual Competition
- Maurizio Randazzo, Sandro Cuomo, and Angelo Mazzoni — Fencing, Men's Épée Team Competition
- Giovanna Trillini, Francesca Bortolozzi-Borella, and Valentina Vezzali — Fencing, Women's Foil Team Competition
- Yuri Chechi — Gymnastics, Men's Rings
- Agostino Abbagnale and Davide Tizzano — Rowing, Men's Double Sculls
- Roberto Di Donna — Shooting, Men's Air Pistol
- Ennio Falco — Shooting, Men's Skeet

=== Silver ===
- Fiona May — Athletics, Women's Long Jump
- Elisabetta Perrone — Athletics, Women's 10 km Walk
- Beniamino Bonomi — Canoeing, Men's K1 1.000 metres Kayak Singles
- Beniamino Bonomi and Daniele Scarpa — Canoeing, Men's K2 500 metres Kayak Pairs
- Imelda Chiappa — Cycling, Women's Individual Road Race
- Margherita Zalaffi, Laura Chiesa, and Elisa Uga — Fencing, Women's Épée Team Competition
- Valentina Vezzali — Fencing, Women's Foil Individual Competition
- Girolamo Giovinazzo — Judo, Men's Extra Lightweight (60 kg)
- Albano Pera — Shooting, Men's Double Trap
- Andrea Sartoretti, Paolo Tofoli, Andrea Zorzi, Pasquale Gravina, Marco Meoni, Samuele Papi, Luca Cantagalli, Andrea Gardini, Andrea Giani, Lorenzo Bernardi, Vigor Bovolenta, and Marco Bracci — Volleyball, Men's Team Competition

=== Bronze ===
- Michele Frangilli, Matteo Bisiani, and Andrea Parenti — Archery, Men's Team Competition
- Alessandro Lambruschini — Athletics, Men's 3.000 metres Steeplechase
- Roberta Brunet — Athletics, Women's 5.000 metres
- Josefa Idem Guerrini — Canoeing, Women's K1 500 metres Kayak Singles
- Raffaello Caserta, Luigi Tarantino, and Tonhi Terenzi – Fencing, Men's Sabre Team Competition
- Giovanna Trillini — Fencing, Women's Foil Individual Competition
- Ylenia Scapin — Judo, Women's Half Heavyweight (72 kg)
- Roberto Didonna — Shooting, Men's Free Pistol
- Andrea Benelli — Shooting, Men's Skeet
- Emanuele Merisi — Swimming, Men's 200m Backstroke
- Leonardo Sottani, Carlo Silipo, Luca Giustolisi, Amedeo Pomilio, Francesco Postiglione, Roberto Calcaterra, Marco Gerini, Alberto Ghibellini, Alessandro Bovo, Alessandro Calcaterra, Alberto Angelini, Francesco Attolico, and Fabio Bencivenga — Water Polo, Men's Team Competition
- Alessandra Sensini — Sailing, Women's Mistral Individual Competition

== Archery ==
The Italian men received unfortunate rankings in the open round, and both Andrea Parenti and Matteo Bisiani quickly found themselves losing to eventual silver medallist Magnus Petersson, in the second and third rounds, respectively. Both had the highest score of any archer to lose in their round. Michele Frangilli advanced to the quarterfinal before facing eventual gold medallist Justin Huish. They won the bronze medal in the team round.

Women's Individual Competition:

- Giovanna Aldegani – round of 32, 28th place (1–1)
- Paola Fantato – round of 64, 54th place (0–1)
- Giuseppina di Blasi – round of 64, 60th place (0–1)

Men's Individual Competition:

- Michele Frangilli – quarterfinal, 6th place (3–1)
- Matteo Bisiani – round of 16, 9th place (2–1)
- Andrea Parenti – round of 32, 17th place (1–1)

Women's Team Competition:

- Aldegani, Fantato, and di Blasi – round of 16, 9th place (0–1)

Men's Team Competition:

- Frangilli, Bisiani, and Parenti – Bronze Medal Match (3–1) → Bronze Medal

== Athletics ==
Men's 100 metres

- Ezio Madonia
- Stefano Tilli

Men's 200 metres

- Sandro Floris

Men's 800 metres

- Giuseppe D'Urso
- Andrea Benvenuti
- Andrea Giocondi

Men's 5,000 metres

- Genny di Napoli

- Qualification — 14:03.56
- Semifinal — 13:28.80
- Final — 13:28.36 (→ 12th place)

- Stefano Baldini

- Qualification — 13:55.41
- Semifinal — 14:06.45 (→ did not advance)

Men's 10,000 metres

- Stefano Baldini

- Qualification — 27:55.79
- Final — 29:07.77 (→ 18th place)

Men's Marathon

- Danilo Goffi — 2:15.08 (→ 9th place)
- Salvatore Bettiol — 2:17.27 (→ 20th place)
- Davide Milesi — 2:21.45 (→ 50th place)

Men's 4 × 100 m Relay

- Giovanni Puggioni, Ezio Madonia, Angelo Cipolloni, and Sandro Floris

- Heat — did not finish (→ did not advance)

Men's 4 × 400 m Relay

- Fabrizio Mori, Alessandro Aimar, Andrea Nuti, and Ashraf Saber

- Heat — 3:03.60
- Semi Final — 3:02.56 (→ did not advance)

Men's 400m Hurdles

- Fabrizio Mori

- Heat — 48.90s
- Semi Final — 48.43s
- Final — 48.41s (→ 6th place)

- Laurent Ottoz

- Heat — 48.92s
- Semi Final — 48.52s (→ did not advance)

- Ashraf Saber

- Heat — 49.71s (→ did not advance)

Men's 3,000 metres Steeplechase

- Alessandro Lambruschini

- Heat — 8:31.69
- Semifinals — 8:27.32
- Final — 8:11.28 (→ Bronze Medal)

- Angelo Carosi

- Heat — 8:30.83
- Semifinals — 8:21.86
- Final — 8:29.67 (→ 9th place)

Men's Long Jump

- Simone Bianchi

- Qualification — 7.79m (→ did not advance)

Men's Shot Put

- Paolo Dal Soglio
- Corrado Fantini
- Giorgio Venturi

Men's Discus Throw

- Diego Fortuna

- Qualification — 60.08m (→ did not advance)

Men's Hammer Throw

- Enrico Sgrulletti

- Qualification — 77.36m
- Final — 76.98m (→ 9th place)

- Loris Paoluzzi

- Qualification — 72.82m (→ did not advance)

Men's Decathlon

- Beniamino Poserina

- Final Result — 7013 points (→ 30th place)

Men's 20 kilometres Walk

- Giovanni Perricelli
- Giovanni De Benedictis
- Michele Didoni

Men's 50 kilometres Walk

- Arturo Di Mezza — 3'44:52 (→ 4th place)
- Giovanni Perricelli — 3'52:31 (→ 13th place)
- Giovanni De Benedictis — did not finish (→ no ranking)

Women's 400 metres

- Virna De Angeli
- Patrizia Spuri

Women's 5,000 metres

- Roberta Brunet
- Silvia Sommaggio

Women's 10,000 metres

- Maria Guida

- Qualification — 31:55.35
- Final — did not start (→ no ranking)

- Silvia Sommaggio

- Qualification — 32:59.40 (→ did not advance)

Women's Marathon

- Ornella Ferrara — 2:33.09 (→ 13th place)
- Maria Curatolo — did not finish (→ no ranking)
- Maura Viceconte — did not finish (→ no ranking)

Women's 100m Hurdles

- Carla Tuzzi

Women's 400m Hurdles

- Virna de Angeli

- Qualification — 57.12 (→ did not advance)

Women's Discus Throw

- Agnese Maffeis

- Qualification — 56.54m (→ did not advance)

Women's High Jump

- Antonella Bevilacqua

- Qualification — 1.93m
- Final — 1.99m (→ 4th place)

Women's Long Jump

- Fiona May

- Qualification — 6.85m
- Final — 7.02m (→ Silver Medal)

Women's Triple Jump

- Barbara Lah

- Qualification — 13.74m (→ did not advance)

Women's Heptathlon

- Giuliana Spada

Women's 10 km Walk

- Elisabetta Perrone – 42:12 (→ Silver Medal)
- Rossella Giordano – 42:43 (→ 5th place)
- Annarita Sidoti – 43:57 (→ 11th place)

== Baseball ==
The Italians were one of four teams that made their second appearance in Olympic baseball in 1996. They improved slightly, upon their seventh-place finish of four years earlier by taking the middle place in a three-way tie for fifth through seventh places. They had defeated Korea and Australia in the preliminary round but had lost their other five preliminary games.

Men's Team Competition:

- Italy – 6th place (2–5)

Team roster

- Claudio Liverzani
- Pier Paolo Illuminati
- Roberto De Franceschi
- David Rigoli
- Marco Urbani
- Francesco Casolari
- Andrea Evangelisti
- Enrico Vecchi
- Massimiliano Masin
- Paolo Ceccaroli
- Ruggero Bagialemani
- Paolo Passerini
- Massimo Fochi
- Alberto d'Auria
- Roberto Cabalisti
- Dante Cabrini
- Marco Barboni
- Rolando Cretis
- Luigi Carrozza
- Fabio Betto

== Basketball ==
=== Women's tournament ===
Preliminary round

Pos	Team	Pld	W	L	PF	PA	PD	Pts	Qualification
1	Brazil	5	5	0	424	360	+64	10	Quarterfinals
2	Russia	5	4	1	378	342	+36	9	Quarterfinals
3	Italy	5	3	2	330	309	+21	8	Quarterfinals
4	Japan	5	2	3	365	396	−31	7	Quarterfinals
5	China	5	1	4	347	378	−31	6	
6	Canada	5	0	5	293	352	−59	5	

Source: FIBA archive
Rules for classification: 1) points; 2) head-to-head points; 3) head-to-head goal average; 4) head-to-head number of points scored.

21 July 1996

Boxscore

Italy	62–53	China
Pts: Caselin 16; Rebs: Schiesaro 5 Asts: Caselin, Ballabio 3		Pts: Li X, Liu J 15; Rebs: three players 5 Asts: Li X, Li D 4

Morehouse College Gymnasium, Atlanta

23 July 1996

Boxscore

Canada	54–59	Italy
Pts: Smith 13; Rebs: Smith 7 Asts: Evans 5		Pts: Fullin, Ballabio 15; Rebs: Pollini, Tufano 4 Asts: Gardellin 3

Morehouse College Gymnasium, Atlanta

25 July 1996

Boxscore

Italy	70–75	Russia
Pts: Pollini 22; Rebs: Pollini 8 Asts: Fullin 5		Pts: Shakirova 24; Rebs: Shakirova, Baranova 12; Asts: Sumnikova 9

Morehouse College Gymnasium, Atlanta

27 July 1996

Boxscore

Japan	52–66	Italy
Pts: Murakami 13; Rebs: Ichijo 9 Asts: Murakami 5		Pts: Pollini, Arnetoli 13; Rebs: Fullin 11; Asts: Pollini, Ballabio 3

Morehouse College Gymnasium, Atlanta

29 July 1996

Boxscore

Italy	73–75	Brazil
Pts: Bonfiglio 15; Rebs: Pollini 5 Asts: Pollini 4		Pts: Janeth 17; Rebs: Marta Sobral 8 Asts: Janeth 5

Morehouse College Gymnasium, Atlanta

Quarterfinals

31 July 1996
20:00

Boxscore

Ukraine	59–50	Italy
Scoring by half: 25–22, 34–28
Pts: Nazarenko 16; Rebs: Zhyrko 15; Asts: Tkachenko 6		Pts: Pollini 13; Rebs: Pollini 8 Asts: Pollini, Fullin 3

Georgia Dome, Atlanta

Classification Round 5th−8th place

1 August 1996
17:00

Boxscore

Cuba	78–70	Italy
Scoring by half: 37–40, 41–30
Pts: Martínez 23; Rebs: Enríquez 17; Asts: Henry 5		Pts: Pollini 15; Rebs: Ballabio, Tufano 8 Asts: three players 3

Georgia Dome, Atlanta

7th place game

3 August 1996
15:00

Boxscore

Italy	69–81	Japan
Scoring by half: 32–41, 37–40
Pts: Paparazzo 19; Rebs: Pollini 6 Asts: Caselin 5		Pts: Hagiwara 21; Rebs: Hagiwara, Hamaguchi 9 Asts: Harada 5

Georgia Dome, Atlanta

== Beach volleyball ==
- Andrea Ghiurghi and Nicola Grigolo — 13th place overall

== Boxing ==
Men's Flyweight (51 kg)

- Carmine Molaro

- First Round — Lost to Hussein Hussein (Australia), 8–11

Men's Lightweight (60 kg)

- Christian Giantomassi

- First Round — Lost to Sergey Kopenkin (Kyrgyzstan), 11–12

Men's Light Middleweight (71 kg)

- Antonio Perugino

- First Round — Defeated José Quinones (Puerto Rico), 10–8
- Second Round — Defeated Roger Pettersson (Sweden), 18–4
- Quarter Finals — Lost to Alfredo Duvergel (Cuba), 8–15

Men's Light Heavyweight (81 kg)

- Pietro Aurino

- First Round — Defeated Yusuf Öztürk (Turkey), 15–7
- Second Round — Lost to Vassili Jirov (Kazakhstan), 13–18

Men's Super Heavyweight (> 91 kg)

- Paolo Vidoz

- First Round — Bye
- Second Round — Lost to Alexis Rubalcaba (Cuba), referee stopped contest in first round

== Cycling ==
=== Road Competition ===
Men's Individual Time Trial

- Maurizio Fondriest

- Final — 1:05:01 (→ 4th place)

- Francesco Casagrande

- Final — 1:09:18 (→ 19th place)

Women's Individual Road Race

- Imelda Chiappa

- Final — 02:36:38 (→ Silver Medal)

- Alessandra Cappellotto

- Final — 02:37:06 (→ 7th place)

- Roberta Bonanomi

- Final — 02:37:06 (→ 32nd place)

Women's Individual Time Trial

- Imelda Chiappa

- Final – 38:47 (→ 8th place)

=== Track Competition ===
Men's Points Race

- Silvio Martinello

- Final — 37 points (→ Gold Medal)

=== Mountain Bike ===
Men's Cross Country

- Daniele Pontoni

- Final — 2:25:08 (→ 5th place)

- Luca Bramati

- Final — 2:26:05 (→ 8th place)

Women's Cross Country

- Paola Pezzo

- Final — 1:50.51 (→ Gold Medal)

- Annabella Stropparo

- Final — 1:55.56 (→ 6th place)

== Diving ==
Men's 3m Springboard

- Davide Lorenzini

- Preliminary Round — 356.55
- Semi Final — 202.80 (→ 15th place)

Women's 3m Springboard

- Francesca d'Oriano

- Preliminary Heat — 208.77 (→ did not advance, 24th place)

Women's 10m Platform

- Francesca d'Oriano

- Preliminary Heat — 202.86 (→ did not advance, 28th place)

== Fencing ==
Sixteen fencers, nine men and seven women, represented Italy in 1996.

Men's foil

- Alessandro Puccini
- Stefano Cerioni
- Marco Arpino

Men's team foil

- Alessandro Puccini, Marco Arpino, Stefano Cerioni

Men's épée

- Sandro Cuomo
- Angelo Mazzoni
- Maurizio Randazzo

Men's team épée

- Sandro Cuomo, Angelo Mazzoni, Maurizio Randazzo

Men's sabre

- Tonhi Terenzi
- Luigi Tarantino
- Raffaelo Caserta

Men's team sabre

- Luigi Tarantino, Raffaelo Caserta, Tonhi Terenzi

Women's foil

- Valentina Vezzali
- Giovanna Trillini
- Diana Bianchedi

Women's team foil

- Francesca Bortolozzi-Borella, Giovanna Trillini, Valentina Vezzali

Women's épée

- Margherita Zalaffi
- Elisa Uga
- Laura Chiesa

Women's team épée

- Elisa Uga, Laura Chiesa, Margherita Zalaffi

== Football ==
=== Men's team competition ===
- Preliminary round (group C)

- Lost to Mexico (0–1)
- Lost to Ghana (2–3)
- Defeated South Korea (2–1) → Did not advance

- Team roster

- Gianluca Pagliuca
- Christian Panucci
- Alessandro Nesta
- Fabio Cannavaro
- Fabio Galante
- Salvatore Fresi
- Raffaele Ametrano
- Massimo Crippa
- Marco Branca
- Massimo Brambilla
- Marco Delvecchio
- Gianluigi Buffon
- Alessandro Pistone
- Damiano Tommasi
- Fabio Pecchia
- Domenico Morfeo
- Cristiano Lucarelli
- Antonino Bernardini
- Luigi Sartor

- Head coach: Cesare Maldini

== Modern pentathlon ==
Men's Individual Competition:

- Cesare Toraldo – 5402 pts (→ 8th place)
- Fabio Nebuloni – 5285 pts (→ 17th place)
- Alessandro Conforto – 5128 pts (→ 25th place)

== Swimming ==
Men's 50m Freestyle

- René Gusperti

- Heat – 22.85
- B-Final – 22.96 (→ 14th place)

Men's 200m Freestyle

- Massimiliano Rosolino

- Heat – 1:48.80
- Final – 1:48.50 (→ 6th place)

- Pier Maria Siciliano

- Heat – 1:49.88
- B-Final – 1:50.07 (→ 13th place)

Men's 400m Freestyle

- Emiliano Brembilla

- Heat – 3:49.35
- Final – 3:49.87 (→ 4th place)

- Massimiliano Rosolino

- Heat – 3:51.05
- Final – 3:51.04 (→ 6th place)

Men's 1500m Freestyle

- Emiliano Brembilla

- Heat – 15:16.72
- Final – 15:08.58 (→ 4th place)

- Marco Formentini

- Heat – 15:41.14 (→ did not advance, 18th place)

Men's 100m Backstroke

- Emanuele Merisi

- Heat – 55.82
- Final – 55.53 (→ 6th place)

Men's 200m Backstroke

- Emanuele Merisi

- Heat – 2:00.01
- Final – 1:59.18 (→ Bronze Medal)

- Mirko Mazzari

- Heat – 1:59.95
- Final – 2:01.27 (→ 7th place)

Men's 100m Butterfly

- Andrea Oriana

- Heat – 56.04 (→ did not advance, 39th place)

Men's 200m Butterfly

- Andrea Oriana

- Heat – 2:00.67 (→ did not advance, 17th place)

Men's 200m Individual Medley

- Luca Sacchi

- Heat – 2:03.24
- B-Final – 2:03.49 (→ 11th place)

Men's 400m Individual Medley

- Luca Sacchi

- Heat – 4:19.63
- Final – 4:18.31 (→ 6th place)

Men's 4 × 200 m Freestyle Relay

- Emiliano Brembilla, Emanuele Idini, Pier Maria Siciliano, and Massimiliano Rosolino

- Heat – 7:22.69

- Massimiliano Rosolino, Emanuele Idini, Emanuele Merisi, and Pier Maria Siciliano

- Final – 7:19.92 (→ 6th place)

Women's 100m Freestyle

- Cecilia Vianini

- Heat – 57.17 (→ did not advance, 24th place)

Women's 200m Backstroke

- Lorenza Vigarani

- Heat – 2:13.58
- Final – 2:14.56 (→ 7th place)

Women's 100m Breaststroke

- Manuela Dalla Valle

- Heat – 1:10.25
- B-Final – 1:11.19 (→ 15th place)

Women's 100m Butterfly

- Ilaria Tocchini

- Heat – 1:01.83 (→ did not advance, 17th place)

Women's 200m Butterfly

- Ilaria Tocchini

- Heat – 2:16.10 (→ did not advance, 17th place)

Women's 4 × 100 m Medley Relay

- Lorenza Vigarani, Manuela Dalla Valle, Ilaria Tocchini, and Cecilia Vianini

- Heat – 4:10.57
- Final – 4:10.59 (→ 8th place)

== Tennis ==
Men's Singles Competition

- Renzo Furlan

- First round — Defeated Jiří Novák (Czech Republic) 4–5 6–4 6–3
- Second round — Defeated Luis Morejon (Ecuador) 7–5 6–2
- Third round — Defeated Marc Rosset (Switzerland) 6–2 4–2 retired
- Quarter Finals — Lost to Leander Paes (India) 1–6 9–7

- Andrea Gaudenzi

- First round — Defeated Carlos Costa (Spain) 6–3 6–2
- Second round — Defeated Oscar Ortiz (Mexico) 6–1 7–6
- Third round — Lost to Andre Agassi (United States) 6–2 4–6 2–6

Women's Singles Competition

- Rita Grande

- First round — Lost to Patricia Hy-Boulais (Canada) 4–6 4–6

- Silvia Farina

- First round — Defeated Clare Wood (Great Britain) 6–2 6–2
- Second round — Lost to Arantxa Sánchez Vicario (Spain) 1–6 3–6

== Volleyball ==
=== Men's Indoor Team Competition ===
- Preliminary round (group B)

- Defeated South Korea (3–0)
- Defeated Tunisia (3–0)
- Defeated Netherlands (3–0)
- Defeated Russia (3–0)
- Defeated Yugoslavia (3–0)

- Quarterfinals

- Defeated Brazil (3–2)

- Semifinals

- Defeated Yugoslavia (3–1)

- Final

- Lost to the Netherlands (2–3) → Silver Medal

- Team roster

- Lorenzo Bernardi
- Vigor Bovolenta
- Marco Bracci
- Luca Cantagalli
- Andrea Gardini
- Andrea Giani
- Pasquale Gravina
- Marco Meoni
- Samuele Papi
- Andrea Sartoretti
- Paolo Tofoli
- Andrea Zorzi

- Head coach: Julio Velasco

== Water polo ==
=== Men's team competition ===
- Preliminary round (group B)

- Defeated United States (10–7)
- Defeated Ukraine (8–6)
- Defeated Croatia (10–8)
- Defeated Greece (10–8)
- Defeated Romania (10–9)

- Quarterfinals

- Defeated Russia (11–9)

- Semifinals

- Lost to Croatia (6–7)

- Bronze Medal Match

- Defeated Hungary (20–18) → Bronze Medal

- Team roster

- Francesco Attolico
- Francesco Postiglione
- Alessandro Bovo
- Fabio Bencivenga
- Alessandro Calcaterra
- Roberto Calcaterra
- Luca Giustolisi
- Alberto Angelini
- Amedeo Pomilio
- Marco Gerini
- Leonardo Sottani
- Carlo Silipo
- Alberto Ghibellini
