= Cuba at the 1996 Summer Olympics =

- IOC code: CUB
- NOC: Cuban Olympic Committee

in Atlanta
- Competitors: 164 (111 men and 53 women) in 15 sports
- Flag bearer: Rolando Tucker
- Medals Ranked 8th: Gold 9 Silver 8 Bronze 8 Total 25

Summer Olympics appearances (overview)
- 1900; 1904; 1908–1920; 1924; 1928; 1932–1936; 1948; 1952; 1956; 1960; 1964; 1968; 1972; 1976; 1980; 1984–1988; 1992; 1996; 2000; 2004; 2008; 2012; 2016; 2020; 2024; 2028

Cuba competed at the 1996 Summer Olympics in Atlanta, United States. 164 competitors, 111 men and 53 women, took part in 84 events in 15 sports.

Due to the hostilities in the US-Cuban relations, Cuban athletes were only allowed to travel to Atlanta following the permission of its local NOC, to avoid any possibility of defections.

== Medalists ==
Medal	Name	Sport	Event	Date
Gold	Filiberto Azcuy	Wrestling	Men's Greco-Roman 74 kg	23 July
Gold	Driulis González	Judo	Women's 56 kg	24 July
Gold	Pablo Lara	Weightlifting	Men's 76 kg	24 July
Gold	Cuba national baseball team: Alberto Hernández; Antonio Pacheco; Antonio Scull; Eduardo Paret; Eliécer Montes; Jorge Fumero; José Antonio Estrada; José Contreras; Juan Manrique; Juan Padilla; Lázaro Vargas; Luis Ulacia; Miguel Caldés; Omar Ajete; Omar Linares; Omar Luis; Orestes Kindelán; Ormari Romero; Pedro Luis Lazo; Rey Isaac	Baseball	Men's tournament	2 August
Gold	Ariel Hernández	Boxing	Middleweight	3 August
Gold	Félix Savón	Boxing	Heavyweight	3 August
Gold	Cuba women's national volleyball team: Ana Fernández; Idalmis Gato; Lilia Izquierdo; Magalys Carvajal; Marlenis Costa; Mireya Luis; Raisa O'Farrill; Regla Bell; Regla Torres; Yumilka Ruiz	Volleyball	Women's tournament	3 August
Gold	Maikro Romero	Boxing	Flyweight	4 August
Gold	Héctor Vinent	Boxing	Light welterweight	4 August
Silver	Iván Trevejo	Fencing	Men's épée	20 July
Silver	Estela Rodríguez	Judo	Women's +72 kg	20 July
Silver	Rodolfo Falcón	Swimming	Men's 100 metre backstroke	23 July
Silver	Juan Luis Marén	Wrestling	Men's Greco-Roman 62 kg	23 July
Silver	Ana Fidelia Quirot	Athletics	Women's 800 metres	29 July
Silver	Arnaldo Mesa	Boxing	Bantamweight	3 August
Silver	Juan Hernández Sierra	Boxing	Welterweight	3 August
Silver	Alfredo Duvergel	Boxing	Light middleweight	3 August
Bronze	Diadenis Luna	Judo	Women's 72 kg	21 July
Bronze	Neisser Bent	Swimming	Men's 100 metre backstroke	23 July
Bronze	Elvis Gregory; Óscar García; Rolando Tucker	Fencing	Men's team foil	25 July
Bronze	Legna Verdecia	Judo	Women's 52 kg	26 July
Bronze	Israel Hernández	Judo	Men's 65 kg	25 July
Bronze	Amarilis Savón	Judo	Women's 48 kg	26 July
Bronze	Yoelbi Quesada	Athletics	Men's triple jump	27 July
Bronze	Alexis Vila	Wrestling	Men's freestyle 48 kg	31 July

== Competitors ==
The following is the list of number of competitors in the Games.

Sport	Men	Women	Total
Athletics	26	20	46
Baseball	20	–	20
Basketball	0	12	12
Beach volleyball	2	0	2
Boxing	12	–	12
Cycling	0	1	1
Fencing	4	3	7
Judo	5	7	12
Rowing	2	0	2
Sailing	2	0	2
Shooting	3	0	3
Swimming	3	0	3
Volleyball	12	10	22
Weightlifting	5	–	5
Wrestling	15	–	15
Total	111	53	164

== Athletics ==
Men
Track and road events

Athlete	Event	Heats		Quarterfinal		Semifinal		Final	
Athlete	Event	Result	Rank	Result	Rank	Result	Rank	Result	Rank
Iván García	200 metres	20.49	8 Q	20.36	2 Q	20.34	6 Q	20.21	6
Norberto Téllez	800 metres	1:47.24	22 Q	—N/a		1:43.79	1 Q	1:42.85	4
Erik Batte	110 metres hurdles	13.47	7 Q	13.46	10 Q	13.26	7 Q	13.43	8
Anier García	110 metres hurdles	13.56	10 Q	13.58	18	Did not advance			
Emilio Valle	110 metres hurdles	13.35	2 Q	13.29	4 Q	13.18	4 Q	13.20	5
Andrés Simón; Joel Lamela; Joel Isasi; Luis Alberto Pérez-Rionda; Iván García (heats only)	4 × 100 metres relay	39.14	10 q	—N/a		38.55	4 Q	39.39	6
Omar Mena; Jorge Crusellas; Georkis Vera; Roberto Hernández	4 × 400 metres relay	3:05.75	19	—N/a		Did not advance			

Field events

Athlete	Event	Qualification		Final	
Athlete	Event	Distance	Position	Distance	Position
Javier Sotomayor	High jump	2.28	9 Q	2.25	11
Jaime Jefferson	Long jump	7.65	31	Did not advance	
Iván Pedroso	Long jump	8.05	9 Q	7.75	12
Yoel García	Triple jump	16.62	20	Did not advance	
Yoelbi Quesada	Triple jump	17.19	3 Q	17.44	3rd place, bronze medalist(s)
Aliecer Urrutia	Triple jump	16.71	15	Did not advance	
Alexis Elizalde	Discus throw	62.22	11 q	62.70	9
Roberto Moya	Discus throw	59.22	22	Did not advance	
Alberto Sánchez	Hammer throw	74.82	13	Did not advance	
Emeterio González	Javelin throw	77.94	18	Did not advance	
Isbel Luaces	Javelin throw	73.84	28	Did not advance	

Combined events – Decathlon

Athlete	Event	100 m	LJ	SP	HJ	400 m	110H	DT	PV	JT	1500 m	Final	Rank
Eugenio Balanqué	Result	10.71	6.36	14.11	1.89	47.46	14.07	41.64	4.70	59.92	4:38.97	7873	25
Eugenio Balanqué	Points	926	666	735	705	935	965	698	819	737	687	7873	25
Raúl Duany	Result	11.20	7.30	13.78	2.07	50.50	14.84	38.56	4.40	62.86	4:35.59	7802	26
Raúl Duany	Points	817	886	715	868	792	869	635	731	781	708	7802	26

Women
Track and road events

Athlete	Event	Heats		Quarterfinal		Semifinal		Final	
Athlete	Event	Result	Rank	Result	Rank	Result	Rank	Result	Rank
Ana Fidelia Quirot	800 metres	1:59.98	13 Q	—N/a		1:57.99	5 Q	1:58.11	2nd place, silver medalist(s)
Aliuska López	100 metres hurdles	13.06	21 Q	12.67	4 Q	12.70	9	Did not advance	
Idalia Hechavarría; Aliuska López; Dainelky Pérez; Liliana Allen	4 × 100 metres relay	44.32	12	—N/a				Did not advance	
Idalmis Bonne; Julia Duporty; Surella Morales; Ana Fidelia Quirot	4 × 400 metres relay	3:24.23	4 Q	—N/a				3:25.85	6

Field events

Athlete	Event	Qualification		Final	
Athlete	Event	Distance	Position	Distance	Position
Ioamnet Quintero	High jump	1.90	17	Did not advance	
Regla Cárdenas	Long jump	6.42	20	Did not advance	
Lissette Cuza	Long jump	6.56	13	Did not advance	
Niurka Montalvo	Long jump	6.48	17	Did not advance	
Yumileidi Cumbá	Shot put	18.55	13	Did not advance	
Belsy Laza	Shot put	18.61	10 q	18.40	10
Bárbara Hechevarría	Discus throw	61.98	13	Did not advance	
Maritza Martén	Discus throw	60.08	16	Did not advance	
Isel López	Javelin throw	61.40	8 q	64.68	4
Odelmys Palma	Javelin throw	62.30	6 q	59.70	11
Xiomara Rivero	Javelin throw	61.32	9 q	64.48	5

Combined event – Heptathlon

Athlete	Event	100H	HJ	SP	200 m	LJ	JT	800 m	Total	Rank
Regla Cárdenas	Result	13.89	1.77	14.14	24.04	6.52	41.72	2:20.48	6246	12
Regla Cárdenas	Points	994	941	803	977	1014	700	817	6246	12
Magalys García	Result	13.30	1.71	13.03	24.04	5.71	51.22	2:21.03	6109	15
Magalys García	Points	1080	867	729	977	762	884	810	6109	15

== Baseball ==
Summary

Team	Event	Round robin								Semi-final	Final	
Team	Event	Opposition Result	Opposition Result	Opposition Result	Opposition Result	Opposition Result	Opposition Result	Opposition Result	Rank	Opposition Result	Opposition Result	Rank
Cuba men's	Men's tournament	Australia; W 19–8	Japan; W 8–7	Netherlands; W 18–2	South Korea; W 14–11	Italy; W 20–6	United States; W 10–8	Nicaragua; W 8–7	1 Q	Nicaragua; W 8–1	Japan; W 13–9	1st place, gold medalist(s)

Team roster

- Alberto Hernández
- Antonio Pacheco
- Antonio Scull
- Eduardo Paret
- Eliecer Montes de Oca
- Jorge Fumero
- José Estrada González
- José Contreras
- Juan Manrique
- Juan Padilla
- Lázaro Vargas
- Luis Ulacia
- Miguel Caldés Luis
- Omar Ajete
- Omar Linares
- Omar Luis
- Orestes Kindelán
- Ormari Romero
- Pedro Luis Lazo
- Rey Isaac

Round robin

Pos	Team	Pld	W	L	RF	RA	RD	PCT	GB	Qualification
1	Cuba	7	7	0	97	49	+48	1.000	—	Advance to knockout round
2	United States (H)	7	6	1	81	27	+54	.857	1	Advance to knockout round
3	Japan	7	4	3	69	45	+24	.571	3	Advance to knockout round
4	Nicaragua	7	4	3	44	30	+14	.571	3	Advance to knockout round
5	Netherlands	7	2	5	32	76	−44	.286	5	
6	Italy	7	2	5	33	71	−38	.286	5	
7	Australia	7	2	5	47	86	−39	.286	5	
8	South Korea	7	1	6	40	59	−19	.143	6	

(H) Hosts

July 20, 3:00 pm	1	2	3	4	5	6	7	8	9	R	H	E
Cuba	2	0	3	3	0	8	0	3		19	20	2
Australia	0	4	0	4	0	0	0	0		8	12	5

July 21, 8:00 pm	1	2	3	4	5	6	7	8	9	10	R	H	E
Japan	0	1	0	0	1	4	0	0	0	1	7	6	0
Cuba	3	3	0	0	0	0	0	0	0	2	8	12	1

July 23, 10:00 am	1	2	3	4	5	6	7	8	9	R	H	E
Netherlands	0	1	0	0	0	1	0			2	4	0
Cuba	2	0	2	1	6	7	x			18	17	0

July 24, 8:00 pm	1	2	3	4	5	6	7	8	9	R	H	E
Cuba	0	1	1	4	0	3	2	3	0	14	20	0
South Korea	0	0	0	2	0	3	1	0	5	11	17	2

July 27, 3:00 pm	1	2	3	4	5	6	7	8	9	R	H	E
Italy	0	0	0	0	4	0	2			6	11	7
Cuba	0	4	5	5	4	2	x			20	19	0

July 28, 3:00 pm	1	2	3	4	5	6	7	8	9	R	H	E
Cuba	4	0	0	0	0	6	0	0	0	10	13	0
United States	1	0	0	0	1	0	3	2	1	8	13	2

July 29, 8:00 pm	1	2	3	4	5	6	7	8	9	R	H	E
Nicaragua	1	0	3	1	2	0	0	0	0	7	13	1
Cuba	0	2	2	1	2	0	0	1	X	8	12	1

Semifinal

August 1, 2:00 pm	1	2	3	4	5	6	7	8	9	R	H	E
Nicaragua	0	1	0	0	0	0	0	0	0	1	6	2
Cuba	0	0	0	3	0	3	0	2	x	8	14	2

Gold medal game

August 2, 7:00 pm	1	2	3	4	5	6	7	8	9	R	H	E
Japan	0	0	0	1	5	0	1	0	2	9	9	1
Cuba	3	3	0	0	0	4	1	2	x	13	14	0

== Basketball ==
Summary

Team	Event	Group stage						Quarterfinal	Semifinal	Final / BM	
Team	Event	Opposition Score	Opposition Score	Opposition Score	Opposition Score	Opposition Score	Rank	Opposition Score	Opposition Score	Opposition Score	Rank
Cuba women's	Women's tournament	United States; L 84–101	South Korea; W 70–55	Australia; L 63–75	Ukraine; L 75–87	Zaire; W 73–59	4 Q	Brazil; L 69–101	Italy; W 78–70	Russia; L 74–91	6

=== Women's tournament ===
Team roster

- Yudith Águila
- Milayda Enríquez
- Gertrudis Gómez
- Cariola Hechavarría
- Dalia Henry
- Grisel Herrera
- Biosotis Lagnó
- María León
- Yamilé Martínez
- Tania Seino
- Lisdeivis Víctores
- Olga Vigil
- Head coach: Miguel del Rio Lopez

Preliminary round

Pos	Team	Pld	W	L	PF	PA	PD	Pts	Qualification
1	United States (H)	5	5	0	507	339	+168	10	Quarterfinals
2	Ukraine	5	3	2	354	358	−4	8 (Note: Head-to-head record: Ukraine 1–0 Australia)	Quarterfinals
3	Australia	5	3	2	369	319	+50	8	Quarterfinals
4	Cuba	5	2	3	365	377	−12	7 (Note: Head-to-head record: Cuba 1–0 South Korea)	Quarterfinals
5	South Korea	5	2	3	347	389	−42	7	
6	Zaire	5	0	5	287	447	−160	5	

Source: FIBA archive
Rules for classification: 1) points; 2) head-to-head points; 3) head-to-head goal average; 4) head-to-head number of points scored.
(H) Hosts
Notes:

21 July 1996

Boxscore

United States	101–84	Cuba
Pts: Leslie 24; Rebs: Leslie 7 Asts: Edwards 9		Pts: Martínez 21; Rebs: Víctores 8 Asts: Lagnó 6

Morehouse College Gymnasium, Atlanta

23 July 1996

Boxscore

Cuba	70–55	South Korea
Pts: León 20; Rebs: Martínez 14; Asts: León, Henry 4		Pts: Jung S-m 16; Rebs: Chun J-w 9 Asts: Chun E-s 3

Morehouse College Gymnasium, Atlanta

25 July 1996

Boxscore

Cuba	63–75	Australia
Pts: Martínez 19; Rebs: Martínez 11; Asts: Seino 4		Pts: Timms 19; Rebs: Sporn 12; Asts: Brogan 4

Morehouse College Gymnasium, Atlanta

27 July 1996

Boxscore

Ukraine	87–75	Cuba
Pts: Zhyrko 22; Rebs: Nazarenko 8 Asts: Tkachenko 6		Pts: Martínez 20; Rebs: Martínez 12; Asts: three players 3

Morehouse College Gymnasium, Atlanta

29 July 1996

Boxscore

Cuba	73–59	Zaire
Pts: León 20; Rebs: Martínez 12; Asts: Henry 7		Pts: Mabika 27; Rebs: Ngalula 9 Asts: three players 3

Morehouse College Gymnasium, Atlanta

Quarterfinals

31 July 1996
22:00

Boxscore

Brazil	101–69	Cuba
Scoring by half: 50–33, 51–36
Pts: Paula, Janeth 19; Rebs: Janeth, Marta Sobral 10; Asts: Janeth 6		Pts: Martínez 25; Rebs: Martínez 9 Asts: four players 2

Georgia Dome, Atlanta

Classification Round 5th−8th place

1 August 1996
17:00

Boxscore

Cuba	78–70	Italy
Scoring by half: 37–40, 41–30
Pts: Martínez 23; Rebs: Enríquez 17; Asts: Henry 5		Pts: Pollini 15; Rebs: Ballabio, Tufano 8 Asts: three players 3

Georgia Dome, Atlanta

5th place game

3 August 1996
17:00

Boxscore

Cuba	74–91	Russia
Scoring by half: 41–44, 33–47
Pts: Martínez 19; Rebs: Martínez 11; Asts: Seino 4		Pts: Baranova 20; Rebs: Baranova 8 Asts: Sumnikova 8

Georgia Dome, Atlanta

== Boxing ==
Athlete	Event	Round of 32	Round of 16	Quarterfinals	Semifinals	Final	Rank
Athlete	Event	Opposition Result	Opposition Result	Opposition Result	Opposition Result	Opposition Result	Rank
Yosvani Aguilera	Light flyweight	Ström (SWE); W RSC R2	Velasco (PHI); L 5–14	Did not advance			
Maikro Romero	Flyweight	Morel (USA); W 24–12	Papyan (ARM); W 22–6	Recaido (PHI); W 18–3	Pakeyev (RUS); W 12–6	Zhumadilov (KAZ); W 12–11	1st place, gold medalist(s)
Arnaldo Mesa	Bantamweight	Larbi (SWE); W 19–5	Raheem (USA); W RSC R1	Bouaita (FRA); W 15–8	Malakhbekov (RUS); W 14–14	Kovács (HUN); L 7–14	2nd place, silver medalist(s)
Lorenzo Aragón	Featherweight	Madjhoud (ALG); W 9–6	Dezorzi (BRA); W 16–6	Mayweather Jr. (USA); L 11–12	Did not advance		
Julio González	Lightweight	Brin (PHI); W 24–13	Gogoladze (GEO); L 9–14	Did not advance			
Héctor Vinent	Light welterweight	Han (KOR); W RSC R2	Süleymanoğlu (TUR); W 23–1	Zakharov (RUS); W 15–7	Niyazymbetov (KAZ); W 23–6	Urkal (GER); W 20–3	1st place, gold medalist(s)
Juan Hernández Sierra	Welterweight	Nagy (HUN); W RSC R2	Mezga (BLR); W 12–2	Smanov (KAZ); W 16–8	Simion (ROU); W 20–7	Saitov (RUS); L 9–14	2nd place, silver medalist(s)
Alfredo Duvergel	Light middleweight	Gilewski (POL); W 10–2	Horodnichov (UKR); W 15–2	Perugino (ITA); W 15–8	Ibraimov (KAZ); W 28–19	Reid (USA); L KO	2nd place, silver medalist(s)
Ariel Hernández	Middleweight	Salem (EGY); W 11–2	Ottke (GER); W 5–0	Lebziak (RUS); W 15–8	Wells (USA); W 17–8	Beyleroğlu (TUR); W 11–3	1st place, gold medalist(s)
Freddy Rojas	Light heavyweight	Mahmoud (EGY); W 20–9	Lee (KOR); L 9–13	Did not advance			
Félix Savón	Heavyweight	Kurnyavka (KGZ); W 9–3	Turkson (SWE); W KO	Kandelaki (GEO); W 20–4	Krasniqi (GER); W w/o	Defiagbon (CAN); W 20–2	1st place, gold medalist(s)
Alexis Rubalcaba	Super heavyweight	Bye	Vidoz (ITA); W RSC R1	Wolfgramm (TGA); L 12–17	Did not advance		

== Cycling ==
=== Road ===
Women

Athlete	Event	Time	Rank
Dania Pérez	Road race	DNF	

=== Track ===
Points race

Athlete	Event	Laps	Points	Rank
Dania Pérez	Women's points race	±0 laps	0	18

== Fencing ==
Seven fencers, four men and three women, represented Cuba in 1996.

Men

Athlete	Event	Round of 64	Round of 32	Round of 16	Quarterfinals	Semifinals	Final	
Athlete	Event	Opposition Result	Opposition Result	Opposition Result	Opposition Result	Opposition Result	Opposition Result	Rank
Oscar García	Foil	Bye	García (ESP); L 11–15	Did not advance				
Elvis Gregory	Foil	Bye	Krzesiński (POL); W 15–10	Omnès (FRA); L 14–15	Did not advance			
Rolando Tucker	Foil	Bye	Wang (CHN); W 15–11	Érsek (HUN); W 15–4	Wienand (GER); L 12–15	Did not advance		
Oscar García; Elvis Gregory; Rolando Tucker	Team foil	—N/a		Bye	South Korea; W 45–34	Russia; L 44–45	Austria; W 45–28	3rd place, bronze medalist(s)
Iván Trevejo	Épée	Bratu (ROU); W 15–10	Nowosielski (CAN); W 15–14	Schmitt (GER); W 15–8	Kaaberma (EST); W 15–14	Imre (HUN); W 15–10	Beketov (RUS); L 14–15	2nd place, silver medalist(s)

Women

Athlete	Event	Round of 64	Round of 32	Round of 16	Quarterfinals	Semifinals	Final	
Athlete	Event	Opposition Result	Opposition Result	Opposition Result	Opposition Result	Opposition Result	Opposition Result	Rank
Tamara Esteri	Épée	Ko (KOR); L 12–15	Did not advance					
Mirayda García	Épée	Arai (JPN); W 15–13	Bürki (SUI); L 11–15	Did not advance				
Milagros Palma	Épée	Lee (KOR); L 12–15	Did not advance					
Tamara Esteri; Mirayda García; Milagros Palma	Team épée	—N/a		Switzerland; W 45–39	France; L 35–45	Germany; W 45–40	Estonia; L 30–45	6

== Judo ==
Men

Athlete	Event	Round of 64	Round of 32	Round of 16	Quarterfinals	Semifinals	Repechage			Final	
Athlete	Event	Round of 64	Round of 32	Round of 16	Quarterfinals	Semifinals	Round 1	Round 2	Round 3	Final	
Athlete	Event	Opposition Result	Opposition Result	Opposition Result	Opposition Result	Opposition Result	Opposition Result	Opposition Result	Opposition Result	Opposition Result	Rank
Manolo Poulot	–60 kg	Bye	Kim (KOR); L	Did not advance							
Israel Hernández	–65 kg	Bye	Fagan (AUS); W	Quellmalz (GER); L	Did not advance		Figuereo (DOM); W	Almeida (POR); W	Revazishvili (GEO); W	Csák (HUN); W	3rd place, bronze medalist(s)
Yosvany Despaigne	–86 kg	Bye	Hachicha (TUN); W	Elisii (ARG); W	Jeon (KOR); L	Did not advance	—N/a	Huizinga (NED); L	Did not advance		
Ángel Sánchez	–95 kg	Bye	Ivan (ROU); W	Soares (POR); L	Did not advance						
Frank Moreno	+95 kg	Van Barneveld (BEL); L	Did not advance								

Women

Athlete	Event	Round of 32	Round of 16	Quarterfinals	Semifinals	Repechage			Final	
Athlete	Event	Round of 32	Round of 16	Quarterfinals	Semifinals	Round 1	Round 2	Round 3	Final	
Athlete	Event	Opposition Result	Opposition Result	Opposition Result	Opposition Result	Opposition Result	Opposition Result	Opposition Result	Opposition Result	Rank
Amarilis Savón	–48 kg	Bye	Souakri (ALG); W	Wolf (USA); W	Tamura (JPN); L	—N/a			Nichilo (FRA); W	3rd place, bronze medalist(s)
Legna Verdecia	–52 kg	Bye	von Schwichow (GER); W	Sugawara (JPN); W	Hyun (KOR); L	—N/a			Muñoz (ESP); W	3rd place, bronze medalist(s)
Driulis González	–56 kg	Baton (FRA); W	Gal (NED); W	Fairbrother (GBR); W	Liu (CHN); W	—N/a			Jung (KOR); W	1st place, gold medalist(s)
Ileana Beltrán	–61 kg	Bye	Gal (NED); L	Did not advance		Buckingham (CAN); W	Álvarez (ESP); L	Did not advance		
Odalis Revé	–66 kg	Dixon (AUS); W	Dubois (FRA); L	Did not advance		—N/a	Spacek (AUT); W	Sweatman (GBR); W	Zwiers (NED); L	5
Diadenis Luna	–72 kg	Bye	Essombe (FRA); L	Did not advance		Jenkins (CAN); W	Gómez (VEN); W	Ertel (GER); W	Beliaieva (UKR); W	3rd place, bronze medalist(s)
Estela Rodríguez	+72 kg	Kohli (IND); W	Son (KOR); W	Filteau (CAN); W	Maksymow (POL); W	—N/a			Sun (CHN); L	2nd place, silver medalist(s)

== Rowing ==
Men

Athlete	Event	Heats		Repechage		Semifinals		Final	
Athlete	Event	Time	Rank	Time	Rank	Time	Rank	Time	Rank
Raúl León; Alexis Arias	Lightweight double sculls	7:01.13	4 R	6:23.52	3 SFC/D	6:37.40	2 FC	6:58.63	16

== Sailing ==
Men

Athlete	Event	Race											Net points	Final rank
Athlete	Event	1	2	3	4	5	6	7	8	9	10	11	Net points	Final rank
Pedro Fernández; Ángel Jiménez	470	22	29	26	17	9	27	13	19	37	21	37	183	26

== Shooting ==
Men

Athlete	Event	Qualification		Final	
Athlete	Event	Score	Rank	Score	Rank
Juan Miguel Rodríguez	Skeet	121	8	did not advance	
Servando Puldón	Skeet	116	38	did not advance	
Alfredo Torres	Skeet	119	20	did not advance	

== Swimming ==
Men

Athlete	Event	Heats		Final A/B	
Athlete	Event	Time	Rank	Time	Rank
Neisser Bent	100 m backstroke	54.83	2 FA	55.02	3rd place, bronze medalist(s)
Neisser Bent	200 m backstroke	2:04.23	20	Did not advance	
Rodolfo Falcón	100 m backstroke	55.29	3 FA	54.98	2nd place, silver medalist(s)
Rodolfo Falcón	200 m backstroke	2:01.20	8 FA	2:08.14	8
Mario González	100 m breaststroke	1:03.05	20	Did not advance	
Mario González	200 m breaststroke	2:16.15	16 FB	2:15.11	10

== Volleyball ==
=== Beach ===
Athlete	Event	First round	Second round	Third round	Fourth round	Elimination					Semifinal	Final / BM	
Athlete	Event	Opposition Result	Opposition Result	Opposition Result	Opposition Result	Opposition Result	Opposition Result	Opposition Result	Opposition Result	Opposition Result	Opposition Result	Opposition Result	Rank
Francisco Álvarez; Juan Rossell	Men's	Englén / Peterson (SWE); W 15–3	Martínez / Conde (ARG); W15–11	Smith / Henkel (USA); L 13–15	Did not advance	—N/a		Prosser / Zahner (AUS); W 15–6	Child / Heese (CAN); L 4–15	Did not advance			

=== Indoor ===
Summary

Team	Event	Group stage						Quarterfinal	Semifinal	Final / BM	
Team	Event	Opposition Score	Opposition Score	Opposition Score	Opposition Score	Opposition Score	Rank	Opposition Score	Opposition Score	Opposition Score	Rank
Cuba men's	Men's tournament	Bulgaria; W 3–0	Poland; W 3–0	United States; W 3–2	Argentina; W 3–0	Brazil; L 0–3	1 Q	Russia; L 0–3	Bulgaria; W 3–1	Brazil; L 0–3	6
Cuba women's	Women's tournament	Canada; W 3–0	Brazil; L 0–3	Peru; W 3–0	Germany; W 3–0	Russia; L 1–3	3 Q	United States; W 3–0	Brazil; W 3–2	China; W 3–1	1st place, gold medalist(s)

==== Men's tournament ====
Team roster

- Alexis Batle
- Angel Beltrán
- Freddy Brooks
- Joel Despaigne
- Raúl Diago
- Jhosvany Hernández
- Osvaldo Hernández
- Lázaro Marín
- Alain Roca
- Rodolfo Sanchez
- Ricardo Vantes
- Nicolas Vives

Group play

Pos	Team	Pld	W	L	Pts	SW	SL	SR	SPW	SPL	SPR	Qualification
1	Cuba	5	4	1	9	12	5	2.400	233	191	1.220	Quarterfinals
2	Brazil	5	3	2	8	10	6	1.667	210	187	1.123	Quarterfinals
3	Bulgaria	5	3	2	8	10	8	1.250	225	212	1.061	Quarterfinals
4	Argentina	5	3	2	8	9	9	1.000	222	225	0.987	Quarterfinals
5	United States	5	2	3	7	10	9	1.111	241	233	1.034	
6	Poland	5	0	5	5	1	15	0.067	151	234	0.645	

21 July 1996	Cuba	3–0	Bulgaria
21 July 1996	(15–9, 15–7, 15–7)

23 July 1996	Cuba	3–0	Poland
23 July 1996	(15–13, 15–2, 15–13)

25 July 1996	Cuba	3–2	United States
25 July 1996	(4–15, 15–9, 14–16, 15–8, 18–16)

27 July 1996	Cuba	3–0	Argentina
27 July 1996	(15–10, 15–12, 15–9)

29 July 1996	Brazil	3–0	Cuba
29 July 1996	(15–11, 15–10, 15–11)

Quarterfinal

31 July 1996	Cuba	0–3	Russia
31 July 1996	(13–15, 15–17, 11–15}

Classification match 5th-8th place

1 August 1996	Cuba	3–1	Bulgaria
1 August 1996	(15–4, 15–12, 16–17 ,15–12)

Fifth place match

2 August 1996	Cuba	0–3	Brazil
2 August 1996	(12–15, 14–16, 14–16)

==== Women's tournament ====
Team roster

- Taismary Agüero
- Regla Bell
- Magalys Carvajal
- Marlenys Costa
- Ana Fernández
- Mirka Francia
- Idalmis Gato
- Lilia Izquierdo
- Mireya Luis
- Raisa O'Farril
- Yumilka Ruíz
- Regla Torres
- Head coach: Eugenio Jorge

Group play

Pos	Team	Pld	W	L	Pts	SW	SL	SR	SPW	SPL	SPR	Qualification
1	Brazil	5	5	0	10	15	1	15.000	238	121	1.967	Quarterfinals
2	Russia	5	4	1	9	12	4	3.000	217	140	1.550	Quarterfinals
3	Cuba	5	3	2	8	10	6	1.667	196	156	1.256	Quarterfinals
4	Germany	5	2	3	7	7	9	0.778	163	191	0.853	Quarterfinals
5	Canada	5	1	4	6	3	14	0.214	156	239	0.653	
6	Peru	5	0	5	5	2	15	0.133	129	252	0.512	

20 July 1996	Canada	0–3	Cuba
20 July 1996	(8–15, 8–15, 5–15); Report

22 July 1996	Cuba	0–3	Brazil
22 July 1996	(11–15, 10–15, 4–15); Report

24 July 1996	Peru	0–3	Cuba
24 July 1996	(2–15, 5–15, 10–15); Report

26 July 1996	Germany	0–3	Cuba
26 July 1996	(6–15, 8–15, 4–15); Report

28 July 1996	Cuba	1–3	Russia
28 July 1996	(15–10, 6–15, 7–15, 8–15); Report

Quarterfinal

30 July 1996	Netherlands	1–3	Russia
30 July 1996	(15–10, 7–15, 9–15, 10–15); Report

Semifinal

1 August 1996	Cuba	3–2	Brazil
1 August 1996	(5–15, 15–8, 10–15, 15–13, 15–12); Report

Gold medal match

3 August 1996	China	1–3	Cuba
3 August 1996	(16–14, 12–15, 16–17, 6–15); Report

== Weightlifting ==
Athlete	Event	Snatch		Clean & jerk		Total	Rank
Athlete	Event	Result	Rank	Result	Rank	Total	Rank
William Vargas	–59 kg	135.0	4	162.5	5	297.5	5
Idalberto Aranda	–70 kg	145.0	11	187.5	2	332.5	8
Pablo Lara	–76 kg	162.5	2	205.0 OR	1	367.5 OR	1st place, gold medalist(s)
Carlos Hernández	–91 kg	175.0	4	207.5	8	382.5	6
Enrique Sabari	–91 kg	165.0	12	205.0	9	370.0	12

== Wrestling ==
Greco-Roman

Athlete	Event	Round of 32	Round of 16	Quarterfinals	Semifinals	Repechage					Final	
Athlete	Event	Round of 32	Round of 16	Quarterfinals	Semifinals	Round 1	Round 2	Round 3	Round 4	Round 5	Final	
Athlete	Event	Opposition Result	Opposition Result	Opposition Result	Opposition Result	Opposition Result	Opposition Result	Opposition Result	Opposition Result	Opposition Result	Opposition Result	Rank
Wilber Sánchez	–48 kg	Maynard (USA); W 12–3	Kutscherenko (GER); W 1–1	Bye	Pavlov (BLR); L 0–5	—N/a				Kang (PRK); L 0–7	Papashvili (GEO); W 4–0	5
Lázaro Rivas	–52 kg	Rønningen (NOR); W 5–0	Al-Faraj (SYR); W 5–0	Bye	Nazaryan (ARM); L 1–7	—N/a				Danielyan (RUS); L 8–9	Anev (BUL); W 5–0	5
Luis Sarmiento	–57 kg	Maia (POR); W 5–0	Yıldız (GER); L 1–4	Did not advance		—N/a	Sandu (ROU); W 7–0	Aghayev (AZE); W 1–0	Elgkian (GRE); W 4–2	Sheng (CHN); L 2–8	Yıldız (GER); L w/o	6
Juan Marén	–62 kg	Pazaj (IRI); W 5–2	Martynov (RUS); W 5–4	Bye	Ivanov (BUL); W 4–1	—N/a					Zawadzki (POL); L 1–3	2nd place, silver medalist(s)
Liubal Colás	–68 kg	Melelashvili (GEO); W 4–2	Memet (ROU); W 3–0	Wolny (POL); L 0–6	Did not advance	—N/a		Smith (USA); W 3–2	Georgiev (BUL); L 0–4	Did not advance	Nikitin (EST); W 6–1	7
Filiberto Azcuy	–74 kg	Baiseitov (KAZ); W 9–1	Morgan (USA); W 10–1	Berzicza (HUN); W 6–2	Iskandaryan (RUS); W 5–4	—N/a					Asell (FIN); W 8–2	1st place, gold medalist(s)
Reynaldo Peña	–90 kg	Eom (KOR); W 2–1	Dimitrov (BUL); L 0–3	Did not advance		—N/a	Kasum (YUG); W 3–0	Švec (CZE); L 2–4	Did not advance			
Héctor Milián	–100 kg	Bell (CAN); W 12–0	Giunta (ITA); W 3–0	Bye	Wroński (POL); L 0–2	—N/a				Edisherashvili (RUS); L 0–1	Grabovetchi (MDA); W w/o	5

Freestyle

Athlete	Event	Round of 32	Round of 16	Quarterfinals	Semifinals	Repechage					Final	
Athlete	Event	Round of 32	Round of 16	Quarterfinals	Semifinals	Round 1	Round 2	Round 3	Round 4	Round 5	Final	
Athlete	Event	Opposition Result	Opposition Result	Opposition Result	Opposition Result	Opposition Result	Opposition Result	Opposition Result	Opposition Result	Opposition Result	Opposition Result	Rank
Alexis Vila	–48 kg	Jacob (NGR); W 4–0	Fernández (MEX); W 11–0	Mkrtchyan (ARM); L 2–4	Did not advance	—N/a		Yefteni (UKR); W 8–0	Bye	Railean (MDA); W 10–0	Orujov (RUS); W 5–2	3rd place, bronze medalist(s)
Carlos Varela	–52 kg	Mohammadi (IRI); L 0–4	Did not advance			Kollar (SVK); L 2–3	Did not advance					
Alejandro Puerto	–57 kg	Trstena (MKD); L 3–4	Did not advance			O'Brien (AUS); W 9–1	Talaei (IRI); L 0–5	Did not advance				
Yosvany Sánchez	–68 kg	Gogol (BLR); L 1–3	Did not advance			Ibire (ARG); W 10–0	Fórizs (HUN); W 6–2	Fallah (IRI); W 3–1	Kõiv (EST); W 6–0	Gevorgyan (ARM); W 8–4	Zazirov (UKR); L 6–8	4
Alberto Rodríguez	–74 kg	Monday (USA); L 1–1	Did not advance			Ceylan (TUR); W 7–0	Momeni (IRI); W 4–1	Gadzhiev (AZE); L 2–6	Did not advance			
Ariel Ramos	–82 kg	Penev (BUL); W 3–1	Magomedov (RUS); L 4–7	Did not advance		—N/a	Khinchagov (UZB); W 3–2	Dvorák (HUN); W 3–1	Öztürk (TUR); L 4–5	Did not advance	Gutches (USA); L 0–3	8
Wilfredo Morales	–100 kg	Kim (KOR); W 6–0	Angle (USA); L 0–2	Did not advance		—N/a	Aavik (EST); W 3–1	Sabejew (GER); L 2–3	Did not advance			

== See also ==
- Cuba at the 1995 Pan American Games

== Notes ==
- (ed.) Watkins, Ginger T. (1997). The Official Report of the Centennial Olympic Games, Volume III The Competition Results (PDF). Atlanta: Peachtree Publishers. ISBN 1-56145-150-9. Archived from the original (PDF) on 2007-09-27.
- "Olympic Medal Winners". International Olympic Committee.
