= Basketball at the 1996 Summer Olympics – Women's tournament =

14th Olympic Basketball Tournament
- Atlanta 1996

Tournament details
- Olympics: 1996 Summer Olympics
- Host nation: United States
- City: Atlanta
- Duration: July 21 - August 4, 1996

Women's tournament
- Teams: 12
Medals
| Gold medalists | United States |
| Silver medalists | Brazil |
| Bronze medalists | Australia |

Tournaments
| ← Barcelona 1992 | Sydney 2000 → |

The women's tournament of basketball at the 1996 Olympics at Atlanta, United States began on July 21 and ended on August 4, when the United States defeated Brazil 111–87 for the gold medal.

== Participants ==
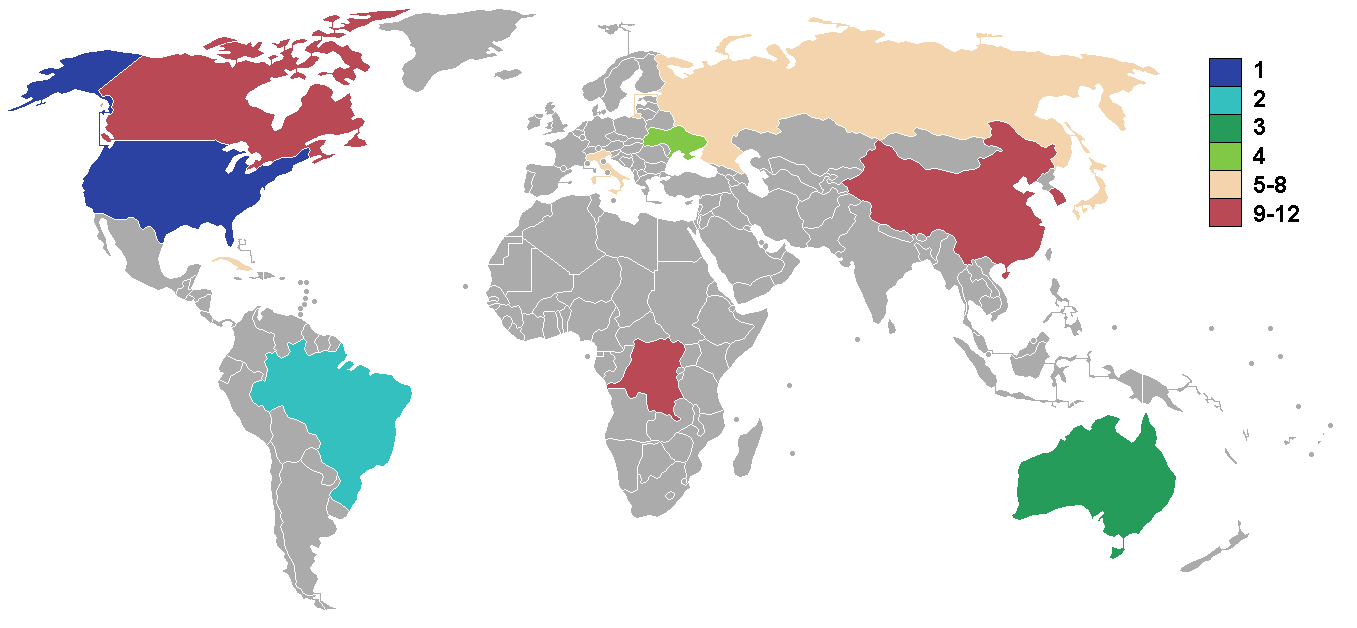
Competing teams.

- Australia
- Brazil
- Canada
- China
- Cuba
- Japan
- South Korea
- Italy
- Russia
- Ukraine
- United States (Host)
- Zaire

== Format ==
- Twelve teams are split into 2 preliminary round groups of 6 teams each. The top 4 teams from each group qualify for the knockout stage.
- Fifth and sixth-placed teams from each group are ranked 9th–12th in two additional matches.
- In the quarterfinals, the matchups are as follows: A1 vs. B4, A2 vs. B3, A3 vs. B2 and A4 vs. B1.
  - The eliminated teams at the quarterfinals are ranked 5th–8th in two additional matches.
- The winning teams from the quarterfinals meet in the semifinals as follows: A3/B2 vs. A1/B4 and A2/B3 vs. A4/B1.
- The winning teams from the semifinals dispute the gold medal. The losing teams dispute the bronze.

Ties are broken via the following the criteria, with the first option used first, all the way down to the last option:

1. Head to head results
2. Goal average (not the goal difference) between the tied teams
3. Goal average of the tied teams for all teams in its group

== Preliminary round ==
The four best teams from each group advanced to the quarterfinal round.

=== Group A ===
| Pos | Team | Pld | W | L | PF | PA | PD | Pts | Qualification |
|---|---|---|---|---|---|---|---|---|---|
| 1 | Brazil | 5 | 5 | 0 | 424 | 360 | +64 | 10 | Quarterfinals |
| 2 | Russia | 5 | 4 | 1 | 378 | 342 | +36 | 9 | Quarterfinals |
| 3 | Italy | 5 | 3 | 2 | 330 | 309 | +21 | 8 | Quarterfinals |
| 4 | Japan | 5 | 2 | 3 | 365 | 396 | −31 | 7 | Quarterfinals |
| 5 | China | 5 | 1 | 4 | 347 | 378 | −31 | 6 | |
| 6 | Canada | 5 | 0 | 5 | 293 | 352 | −59 | 5 | |

Source: FIBA archive
Rules for classification: 1) points; 2) head-to-head points; 3) head-to-head goal average; 4) head-to-head number of points scored.

21 July 1996

Boxscore

| Brazil | 69–56 | Canada |
| Pts: Paula, Janeth 17; Rebs: Janeth 8 Asts: Janeth 4 | | Pts: Blackwell 11; Rebs: Smith 7 Asts: Evans 4 |

Morehouse College Gymnasium, Atlanta

21 July 1996

Boxscore

| Japan | 63–73 | Russia |
| Pts: Kato 15; Rebs: Kato 9 Asts: Murakami 6 | | Pts: Baranova 21; Rebs: Baranova 13; Asts: Sumnikova 5 |

Morehouse College Gymnasium, Atlanta

21 July 1996

Boxscore

| Italy | 62–53 | China |
| Pts: Caselin 16; Rebs: Schiesaro 5 Asts: Caselin, Ballabio 3 | | Pts: Li X, Liu J 15; Rebs: three players 5 Asts: Li X, Li D 4 |

Morehouse College Gymnasium, Atlanta

23 July 1996

Boxscore

| China | 72–75 | Japan |
| Pts: Zheng H 31; Rebs: Zheng H 16; Asts: Li X 6 | | Pts: Hagiwara 23; Rebs: Kato 10; Asts: Murakami 4 |

Morehouse College Gymnasium, Atlanta

23 July 1996

Boxscore

| Canada | 54–59 | Italy |
| Pts: Smith 13; Rebs: Smith 7 Asts: Evans 5 | | Pts: Fullin, Ballabio 15; Rebs: Pollini, Tufano 4 Asts: Gardellin 3 |

Morehouse College Gymnasium, Atlanta

23 July 1996

Boxscore

| Russia | 68–82 | Brazil |
| Pts: Rutkovskaya 18; Rebs: Baranova 9 Asts: Zaboluyeva 3 | | Pts: Hortência 20; Rebs: Marta Sobral 9 Asts: three players 4 |

Morehouse College Gymnasium, Atlanta

25 July 1996

Boxscore

| Italy | 70–75 | Russia |
| Pts: Pollini 22; Rebs: Pollini 8 Asts: Fullin 5 | | Pts: Shakirova 24; Rebs: Shakirova, Baranova 12; Asts: Sumnikova 9 |

Morehouse College Gymnasium, Atlanta

25 July 1996

| Brazil | 100–80 | Japan |
| Pts: Paula 25; Rebs: Leila 14; Asts: Paula 10 | | Pts: Ichijo 16; Rebs: Nagata, Murakami 5 Asts: Murakami 4 |

Morehouse College Gymnasium, Atlanta

25 July 1996

Boxscore

| Canada | 49–61 | China |
| Pts: three players 8 Rebs: Norman 9 Asts: Evans 5 | | Pts: Zheng H 19; Rebs: Zheng H 16; Asts: Zheng D 4 |

Morehouse College Gymnasium, Atlanta

27 July 1996

Boxscore

| Japan | 52–66 | Italy |
| Pts: Murakami 13; Rebs: Ichijo 9 Asts: Murakami 5 | | Pts: Pollini, Arnetoli 13; Rebs: Fullin 11; Asts: Pollini, Ballabio 3 |

Morehouse College Gymnasium, Atlanta

27 July 1996

Boxscore

| China | 83–98 | Brazil |
| Pts: He J 22; Rebs: Liang X 5 Asts: Zheng D, Liu J 6 | | Pts: Janeth 26; Rebs: three players 9 Asts: Paula 8 |

Morehouse College Gymnasium, Atlanta

27 July 1996

Boxscore

| Russia | 68–49 | Canada |
| Pts: Nikonova 18; Rebs: Baranova 11; Asts: Sumnikova 5 | | Pts: Norman 15; Rebs: Norman 8 Asts: three players 2 |

Morehouse College Gymnasium, Atlanta

29 July 1996

Boxscore

| Russia | 94–78 | China |
| Pts: Baranova 26; Rebs: Baranova 18; Asts: Sumnikova 10 | | Pts: Zheng D, Ma Z 14; Rebs: Liang X 6 Asts: Zheng D 5 |

Morehouse College Gymnasium, Atlanta

29 July 1996

Boxscore

| Italy | 73–75 | Brazil |
| Pts: Bonfiglio 15; Rebs: Pollini 5 Asts: Pollini 4 | | Pts: Janeth 17; Rebs: Marta Sobral 8 Asts: Janeth 5 |

Morehouse College Gymnasium, Atlanta

29 July 1996

Boxscore

| Canada | 85–95 | Japan |
| Pts: Jerant 15; Rebs: Norman 10; Asts: Evans 4 | | Pts: Hagiwara 26; Rebs: Murakami, Ichijo 5 Asts: Murakami, Kato 5 |

Morehouse College Gymnasium, Atlanta

=== Group B ===
| Pos | Team | Pld | W | L | PF | PA | PD | Pts | Qualification |
|---|---|---|---|---|---|---|---|---|---|
| 1 | United States (H) | 5 | 5 | 0 | 507 | 339 | +168 | 10 | Quarterfinals |
| 2 | Ukraine | 5 | 3 | 2 | 354 | 358 | −4 | 8 (Note: Head-to-head record: Ukraine 1–0 Australia) | Quarterfinals |
| 3 | Australia | 5 | 3 | 2 | 369 | 319 | +50 | 8 | Quarterfinals |
| 4 | Cuba | 5 | 2 | 3 | 365 | 377 | −12 | 7 (Note: Head-to-head record: Cuba 1–0 South Korea) | Quarterfinals |
| 5 | South Korea | 5 | 2 | 3 | 347 | 389 | −42 | 7 | |
| 6 | Zaire | 5 | 0 | 5 | 287 | 447 | −160 | 5 | |

Source: FIBA archive
Rules for classification: 1) points; 2) head-to-head points; 3) head-to-head goal average; 4) head-to-head number of points scored.
(H) Hosts
Notes:

21 July 1996

Boxscore

| Zaire | 65–81 | Ukraine |
| Pts: Mabika 14; Rebs: Ngalula, Tshijuka 7 Asts: Kamanga 4 | | Pts: Tkachenko 27; Rebs: Nazareko 9 Asts: Tkachenko, Zhyrko 5 |

Morehouse College Gymnasium, Atlanta

21 July 1996

Boxscore

| United States | 101–84 | Cuba |
| Pts: Leslie 24; Rebs: Leslie 7 Asts: Edwards 9 | | Pts: Martínez 21; Rebs: Víctores 8 Asts: Lagnó 6 |

Morehouse College Gymnasium, Atlanta

21 July 1996

Boxscores

| South Korea | 61–76 | Australia |
| Pts: Yoo Y-j 16; Rebs: Yu Y-j 9 Asts: Chun J-w 5 | | Pts: Sporn 21; Rebs: Sporn, Sandie 10; Asts: Timms 5 |

Morehouse College Gymnasium, Atlanta

23 July 1996

Boxscore

| Ukraine | 65–98 | United States |
| Pts: Nazarenko 14; Rebs: Shliakhova 5 Asts: four players 2 | | Pts: Bolton 21; Rebs: Leslie 9 Asts: Swoopes 7 |

Morehouse College Gymnasium, Atlanta

23 July 1996

Boxscore

| Australia | 91–45 | Zaire |
| Pts: Sandie 18; Rebs: Sandie 8 Asts: Timms, Fallon 4 | | Pts: Tshijuka 15; Rebs: Tshijuka 10; Asts: Kamanga 5 |

Morehouse College Gymnasium, Atlanta

23 July 1996

Boxscore

| Cuba | 70–55 | South Korea |
| Pts: León 20; Rebs: Martínez 14; Asts: León, Henry 4 | | Pts: Jung S-m 16; Rebs: Chun J-w 9 Asts: Chun E-s 3 |

Morehouse College Gymnasium, Atlanta

25 July 1996

Boxscore

| United States | 107–47 | Zaire |
| Pts: Azzi 18; Rebs: McCray 8 Asts: Edwards 5 | | Pts: Ngalula 17; Rebs: Tshijuka, Lobela 5 Asts: Mabika 3 |

Morehouse College Gymnasium, Atlanta

25 July 1996

Boxscore

| South Korea | 72–67 | Ukraine |
| Pts: Yoo Y-j, Chun E-s 14; Rebs: Jung S-m 7 Asts: Chun E-s, Chun J-w 5 | | Pts: Tkachenko 21; Rebs: Tkachenko 11; Asts: Zhyrko 8 |

Morehouse College Gymnasium, Atlanta

25 July 1996

Boxscore

| Cuba | 63–75 | Australia |
| Pts: Martínez 19; Rebs: Martínez 11; Asts: Seino 4 | | Pts: Timms 19; Rebs: Sporn 12; Asts: Brogan 4 |

Morehouse College Gymnasium, Atlanta

27 July 1996

Boxscore

| Zaire | 71–95 | South Korea |
| Pts: Mabika 30; Rebs: Tshijuka, Ngalula 7 Asts: Ngalula 3 | | Pts: Chun E-s 29; Rebs: Chun J-w 6 Asts: Chun E-s 14 |

Morehouse College Gymnasium, Atlanta

27 July 1996

Boxscore

| Ukraine | 87–75 | Cuba |
| Pts: Zhyrko 22; Rebs: Nazarenko 8 Asts: Tkachenko 6 | | Pts: Martínez 20; Rebs: Martínez 12; Asts: three players 3 |

Morehouse College Gymnasium, Atlanta

27 July 1996

Boxscore

| Australia | 79–96 | United States |
| Pts: Timms 26; Rebs: Sporn 7 Asts: Maher 3 | | Pts: McClain 24; Rebs: McClain 11; Asts: Edwards 15 |

Morehouse College Gymnasium, Atlanta

29 July 1996

Boxscore

| Ukraine | 54–48 | Australia |
| Pts: Dovhaliuk 15; Rebs: Nazarenko 15; Asts: Tkachenko, Burenok 3 | | Pts: Timms 13; Rebs: Sporn 10; Asts: Timms 3 |

Morehouse College Gymnasium, Atlanta

29 July 1996

Boxscore

| South Korea | 64–105 | United States |
| Pts: Jung S-m 17; Rebs: Jung S-m 6 Asts: Chun J-w 7 | | Pts: McCray 16; Rebs: McCray 9 Asts: Swoopes 4 |

Morehouse College Gymnasium, Atlanta

29 July 1996

Boxscore

| Cuba | 73–59 | Zaire |
| Pts: León 20; Rebs: Martínez 12; Asts: Henry 7 | | Pts: Mabika 27; Rebs: Ngalula 9 Asts: three players 3 |

Morehouse College Gymnasium, Atlanta

== Knockout stage ==
=== Championship bracket ===
Quarterfinals (July 31)
B1 | Brazil | 101
A4 | Cuba | 69
A2 | Ukraine | 59
B3 | Italy | 50
B2 | Russia | 70
A3 | Australia | 74
A1 | United States | 108
B4 | Japan | 93

Semifinals (August 2)
B1 | Brazil | 81
A2 | Ukraine | 60
A3 | Australia | 71
A1 | United States | 93

Gold medal (August 4)
B1 | Brazil | 87
A1 | United States | 111
Bronze medal (August 4)
A2 | Ukraine | 56
A3 | Australia | 66

==== Classification brackets ====
9th–12th Place

July 31
B6 | Zaire | 67
A5 | China | 91
A6 | Canada | 79
B5 | South Korea | 88

9th place (August 3)
A5 | China | 85
B5 | South Korea | 71
11th place (August 3)
B6 | Zaire | 46
A6 | Canada | 88

5th–8th Place

August 1
A4 | Japan | 69
A2 | Russia | 80
B4 | Cuba | 78
A3 | Italy | 70

5th place (August 3)
B4 | Cuba | 74
A2 | Russia | 91
7th place (August 3)
A3 | Italy | 69
A4 | Japan | 81

=== Classification round 9th−12th place ===
31 July 1996
10:00

Boxscore

| Zaire | 67–91 | China |
Scoring by half: 36–47, 31–44
| Pts: Mabika 30; Rebs: Lobela 9 Asts: Ngalula 3 | | Pts: Zheng H 26; Rebs: Zheng H 10; Asts: Ma Z 6 |

Georgia Dome, Atlanta

31 July 1996
12:00

Boxscore

| Canada | 79–88 | South Korea |
Scoring by half: 41–37, 38–51
| Pts: Norman 17; Rebs: Norman 8 Asts: Karch-Gailus 8 | | Pts: Chun J-w 31; Rebs: Jung S-m, Yoo Y-j 4 Asts: Chun J-w 9 |

Georgia Dome, Atlanta

11th-place game

3 August 1996
10:00

Boxscore

| Zaire | 46–88 | Canada |
Scoring by half: 20–52, 26–36
| Pts: Ngalula 12; Rebs: Tshijuka 9 Asts: Ngalula, Pikinini 2 | | Pts: Smith 21; Rebs: Norman 10; Asts: Karch-Gailus 6 |

Georgia Dome, Atlanta

9th-place game

3 August 1996
12:00

Boxscore

| China | 85–71 | South Korea |
Scoring by half: 48–39, 37–32
| Pts: Zheng H 29; Rebs: Zheng H 10; Asts: Zheng D 10 | | Pts: Chun J-w 20; Rebs: Yoo Y-j 6 Asts: Han H-s 5 |

Georgia Dome, Atlanta

=== Quarterfinals ===
31 July 1996
15:00

Boxscore

| United States | 108–93 | Japan |
Scoring by half: 59–44, 49–49
| Pts: Leslie 35; Rebs: McClain 16; Asts: Edwards 12 | | Pts: Ichijo, Hagiwara 22; Rebs: Kato 8 Asts: Murakami 10 |

Georgia Dome, Atlanta

31 July 1996
17:00

Boxscore

| Russia | 70–74 (OT) | Australia |
Scoring by half: 38–38, 26–26 Overtime: 6–10
| Pts: Nikonova 16; Rebs: Baranova 21; Asts: Sumnikova 5 | | Pts: Brogan 17; Rebs: Brogan, Whittle 8 Asts: Brogan, Timms 3 |

Georgia Dome, Atlanta

31 July 1996
20:00

Boxscore

| Ukraine | 59–50 | Italy |
Scoring by half: 25–22, 34–28
| Pts: Nazarenko 16; Rebs: Zhyrko 15; Asts: Tkachenko 6 | | Pts: Pollini 13; Rebs: Pollini 8 Asts: Pollini, Fullin 3 |

Georgia Dome, Atlanta

31 July 1996
22:00

Boxscore

| Brazil | 101–69 | Cuba |
Scoring by half: 50–33, 51–36
| Pts: Paula, Janeth 19; Rebs: Janeth, Marta Sobral 10; Asts: Janeth 6 | | Pts: Martínez 25; Rebs: Martínez 9 Asts: four players 2 |

Georgia Dome, Atlanta

=== Classification round 5th−8th place ===
1 August 1996
15:00

Boxscore

| Russia | 80–69 | Japan |
Scoring by half: 39–34, 41–35
| Pts: Baranova 37; Rebs: Baranova 13; Asts: Sumnikova 14 | | Pts: Kato 19; Rebs: Ichijo 12; Asts: Murakami 7 |

Georgia Dome, Atlanta

1 August 1996
17:00

Boxscore

| Cuba | 78–70 | Italy |
Scoring by half: 37–40, 41–30
| Pts: Martínez 23; Rebs: Enríquez 17; Asts: Henry 5 | | Pts: Pollini 15; Rebs: Ballabio, Tufano 8 Asts: three players 3 |

Georgia Dome, Atlanta

7th-place game

3 August 1996
15:00

Boxscore

| Italy | 69–81 | Japan |
Scoring by half: 32–41, 37–40
| Pts: Paparazzo 19; Rebs: Pollini 6 Asts: Caselin 5 | | Pts: Hagiwara 21; Rebs: Hagiwara, Hamaguchi 9 Asts: Harada 5 |

Georgia Dome, Atlanta

5th-place game

3 August 1996
17:00

Boxscore

| Cuba | 74–91 | Russia |
Scoring by half: 41–44, 33–47
| Pts: Martínez 19; Rebs: Martínez 11; Asts: Seino 4 | | Pts: Baranova 20; Rebs: Baranova 8 Asts: Sumnikova 8 |

Georgia Dome, Atlanta

=== Semifinals ===
2 August 1996
15:00

Boxscore

| Brazil | 81–60 | Ukraine |
Scoring by half: 48–36, 33–24
| Pts: Paula 24; Rebs: Alessandra 13; Asts: Paula 6 | | Pts: Zhyrko 15; Rebs: Sadovnykova 6 Asts: Tkachenko 5 |

Georgia Dome, Atlanta

2 August 1996
17:00

Boxscore

| Australia | 71–93 | United States |
Scoring by half: 32–47, 39–46
| Pts: Timms 27; Rebs: Maher 6 Asts: Timms 4 | | Pts: Leslie 22; Rebs: McClain 15; Asts: Edwards 8 |

Georgia Dome, Atlanta

=== Bronze-medal game ===
4 August 1996
16:00

Boxscore

| Ukraine | 56–66 | Australia |
Scoring by half: 24–33, 32–33
| Pts: Zhyrko 16; Rebs: Zhyrko 9 Asts: Zhyrko, Nazarenko 3 | | Pts: Brogan 19; Rebs: Brogan 12; Asts: Timms 4 |

Georgia Dome, Atlanta

=== Gold-medal game ===
4 August 1996
18:35

Boxscore

| Brazil | 87–111 | United States |
Scoring by half: 46–57, 41–54
| Pts: Arcain 24; Rebs: Alessandra 9 Asts: Paula 10 | | Pts: Leslie 29; Rebs: Leslie 6 Asts: Edwards 10 |

Georgia Dome, Atlanta

== Awards ==
1996 Olympic Basketball Champions

United States
Third title

== Final standings ==
| Rank | Team | Pld | W | L |
|---|---|---|---|---|
| 1st place, gold medalist(s) | United States | 8 | 8 | 0 |
| 2nd place, silver medalist(s) | Brazil | 8 | 7 | 1 |
| 3rd place, bronze medalist(s) | Australia | 8 | 5 | 3 |
| 4th | Ukraine | 8 | 4 | 4 |
Eliminated at the quarterfinals
| 5th | Russia | 8 | 6 | 2 |
| 6th | Cuba | 8 | 3 | 5 |
| 7th | Japan | 8 | 3 | 5 |
| 8th | Italy | 8 | 3 | 5 |
Preliminary round 5-6th placers
| 9th | China | 7 | 3 | 4 |
| 10th | South Korea | 7 | 3 | 4 |
| 11th | Canada | 7 | 1 | 6 |
| 12th | Zaire | 7 | 0 | 7 |
