= 1996 United States women's Olympic basketball team =

- Head coach: Tara VanDerveer

The 1996 United States women's Olympic basketball team competed in the Games of the XXVI Olympiad which were held in Atlanta, Georgia. The U.S. women's Olympic team won their third gold medal at the event, going undefeated and beating Brazil in the Gold medal final. The team, considered to be one of the best in women's basketball history, entered the Naismith Basketball Hall of Fame as a unit on August 15, 2026.

== Roster ==
United States women's national basketball team roster
Players
Coaches

Pos.	No.	Name	Age – Date of birth	Height	Club	Ctr.
PG		Jennifer Azzi	27 – August 31, 1968	1.73 m (5 ft 8 in)	Stanford	(United States)
G		Ruthie Bolton-Holifield	29 – May 25, 1967	1.75 m (5 ft 9 in)	U.S. national team	(United States)
SG		Teresa Edwards	32 – June 19, 1964	1.80 m (5 ft 11 in)	US Valenciennes Olympic	(France)
F		Venus Lacy	29 – February 9, 1967	1.93 m (6 ft 4 in)	U.S. national team	(United States)
F/C		Lisa Leslie	24 – July 7, 1972	1.96 m (6 ft 5 in)	USC	(United States)
F/C		Rebecca Lobo	22 – October 6, 1973	1.93 m (6 ft 4 in)	UConn	(United States)
F		Katrina McClain	31 – July 19, 1965	1.85 m (6 ft 1 in)	Galatasaray	(Turkey)
G		Nikki McCray	24 – December 17, 1971	1.80 m (5 ft 11 in)	U.S. national team	(United States)
F/C		Carla McGhee	28 – March 3, 1968	1.88 m (6 ft 2 in)	U.S. national team	(United States)
G		Dawn Staley	26 – May 4, 1970	1.68 m (5 ft 6 in)	Tarbes Gespe Bigorre	(France)
SF		Katy Steding	28 – December 11, 1967	1.83 m (6 ft 0 in)	U.S. national team	(United States)
F		Sheryl Swoopes	25 – March 25, 1971	1.83 m (6 ft 0 in)	U.S. national team	(United States)

Head coach

- (United States) Tara VanDerveer

Assistant coach(es)

(United States)

Legend

- Club – describes last
  club before the competition
- Age – describes age
  on July 26, 1996
- Source –

== Results ==
=== Group stage ===
21 July 1996

United States	101–84	Cuba
Pts: Leslie 24; Rebs: Leslie 7 Asts: Edwards 9		Pts: Martínez 21; Rebs: Víctores 8 Asts: Lagnó 6

Morehouse College Gymnasium, Atlanta

23 July 1996

Ukraine	65–98	United States
Pts: Nazarenko 14; Rebs: Shliakhova 5 Asts: four players 2		Pts: Bolton 21; Rebs: Leslie 9 Asts: Swoopes 7

Morehouse College Gymnasium, Atlanta

25 July 1996

United States	107–47	Zaire
Pts: Azzi 18; Rebs: McCray 8 Asts: Edwards 5		Pts: Ngalula 17; Rebs: Tshijuka, Lobela 5 Asts: Mabika 3

Morehouse College Gymnasium, Atlanta

27 July 1996

Australia	79–96	United States
Pts: Timms 26; Rebs: Sporn 7 Asts: Maher 3		Pts: McClain 24; Rebs: McClain 11; Asts: Edwards 15

Georgia Dome, Atlanta

29 July 1996

South Korea	64–105	United States
Pts: Jung S-m 17; Rebs: Jung S-m 6 Asts: Chun J-w 7		Pts: McCray 16; Rebs: McCray 9 Asts: Swoopes 4

Morehouse College Gymnasium, Atlanta

=== Quarterfinal ===
31 July 1996
15:00

United States	108–93	Japan
Scoring by half: 59–44, 49–49
Pts: Leslie 35; Rebs: McClain 16; Asts: Edwards 12		Pts: Ichijo, Hagiwara 22; Rebs: Kato 8 Asts: Murakami 10

Georgia Dome, Atlanta

=== Semifinal ===
2 August 1996
17:00

Australia	71–93	United States
Scoring by half: 32–47, 39–46
Pts: Timms 27; Rebs: Maher 6 Asts: Timms 4		Pts: Leslie 22; Rebs: McClain 15; Asts: Edwards 8

Georgia Dome, Atlanta

=== Gold Medal Final ===
4 August 1996
18:35

Brazil	87–111	United States
Scoring by half: 46–57, 41–54
Pts: Arcain 24; Rebs: Alessandra 9 Asts: Paula 10		Pts: Leslie 29; Rebs: Leslie 6 Asts: Edwards 10

Georgia Dome, Atlanta

== Legacy ==
The '96 Olympic team is considered to be the best women's national team assembled. It is also credited with helping launch the WNBA, the most successful professional women's basketball league in the United States and around the world.

In 2022, ESPN aired a 30 for 30 three-part documentary series on the team called "Dream On". It highlighted how far women's basketball (and in sports in general) have come and also what remains to be achieved.

== See also ==
- 1996 Summer Olympics
- Basketball at the 1996 Summer Olympics
- United States at the 1996 Summer Olympics
- United States women's national basketball team
