= Ghibellini (surname) =

Ghibellini is an Italian surname. Notable people with this name include the following:

- Alberto Ghibellini (born 1973), Italian water polo player
- Alessandro Ghibellini (born 1947), Italian water polo player
