= Vita Horobets =

Ukrainian basketball player (born 1996)

No. 8 – BC TIM-SKUF Kyiv
- Position: Shooting guard
- League: UBSL

Personal information
- Born: 6 April 1996 (age 30) Koshyv, Ukraine
- Listed height: 5 ft 11 in (1.80 m)

Vita Horobets (born 6 April 1996) is a Ukrainian basketball player for BC TIM-SKUF Kyiv and the Ukrainian national team.

She participated at the EuroBasket Women 2017.
