= Anna Olkhovyk =

Ukrainian basketball player

No. 31 – BC TIM-SKUF Kyiv
- Position: Small forward
- League: UBSL

Personal information
- Born: 18 June 1987 (age 39) Kiev, Soviet Union
- Listed height: 6 ft 1 in (1.85 m)

Anna Olkhovyk (born 18 June 1987) is a Ukrainian basketball player for BC TIM-SKUF Kyiv and the Ukrainian national team. She was born in Kiev, Ukraine.

She participated at the EuroBasket Women 2017.
