= Vitaliy Khalchaytskiy =

Ukrainian water polo player

Personal information
- Nationality: Ukrainian
- Born: 22 August 1964 (age 60)

Sport
- Sport: Water polo

Vitaliy Khalchaytskiy (born 22 August 1964) is a Ukrainian water polo player. He competed in the men's tournament at the 1996 Summer Olympics.
