= Vadym Kebalo =

Ukrainian water polo player

Personal information
- Nationality: Ukrainian
- Born: 20 April 1967 (age 57); Sevastopol, Ukrainian SSR, Soviet Union

Sport
- Sport: Water polo

Vadym Kebalo (born 20 April 1967) is a Ukrainian water polo player. He competed in the men's tournament at the 1996 Summer Olympics.
