= Piermaria Siciliano =

Italian swimmer (born 1974)

Personal information
- Born: 27 June 1974 (age 52)
Medal record
Men's swimming
Representing Italy
European Championships (LC)
Bronze medal – third place	1995 Vienna	4×200 m freestyle

Piermaria Siciliano (born 27 June 1974, in Catania) is a retired freestyle swimmer from Italy, who represented his native country at two consecutive Summer Olympics: 1992 and 1996. He won the bronze medal in the men's 4×200 m freestyle at the 1995 European Aquatics Championships, alongside Massimiliano Rosolino, Emanuele Merisi, and Emanuele Idini.
