= Andrea Oriana =

Italian swimmer

Personal information
- Born: 16 June 1973 (age 53) Gravedona, Italy

Sport
- Sport: Swimming
- Club: Canottieri Lecco

Andrea Oriana (born 16 June 1973) is an Italian former butterfly swimmer. He competed in two events at the 1996 Summer Olympics.
