= Chikako Murakami =

Chikako Murakami may refer to:

- Chikako Murakami (basketball)
- Chikako Murakami (tennis)
