= Oleksandr Potulnytskiy =

Ukrainian water polo player

Personal information
- Nationality: Ukrainian
- Born: 17 April 1969 (age 55)

Sport
- Sport: Water polo

Oleksandr Potulnytskiy (born 17 April 1969) is a Ukrainian water polo player. He competed in the men's tournament at the 1996 Summer Olympics.
