= Francesca D'Oriano =

Italian diver (born 1975)

Personal information
- Nationality: Italian
- Born: 26 September 1975 (age 50) Florence, Italy

Sport
- Sport: Diving

Francesca D'Oriano (born 26 September 1975) is an Italian diver. She competed in two events at the 1996 Summer Olympics.
