= Shah Kohli =

Indian judoka

Personal information
- Nationality: Indian
- Born: 12 July 1976 (age 49)

Sport
- Sport: Judo

Arti Solanki (née Shah Kohli; born 12 July 1976) is an Indian judoka. She competed in the women's heavyweight event at the 1996 Summer Olympics.
