= Viktoriya Burenok =

Ukrainian basketball player

Personal information
- Nationality: Ukrainian
- Born: 4 October 1965 (age 60) Kramatorsk, Ukraine

Sport
- Sport: Basketball
Medal record
Women's basketball
Representing Ukraine
European Championships
Gold medal – first place	1995 Czech Republic	Team competition

Viktoriya Burenok (born 4 October 1965) is a Ukrainian basketball player. She competed in the women's tournament at the 1996 Summer Olympics.
