= Nicoletta Caselin =

Italian basketball player (born 1973)

Personal information
- Nationality: Italian
- Born: 7 April 1973 (age 51); Schio, Italy

Sport
- Sport: Basketball

Nicoletta Caselin (born 7 April 1973) is an Italian former basketball player. She competed in the women's tournament at the 1996 Summer Olympics.
