= Kasala Kamanga =

Congolese basketball player

Personal information
- Nationality: Congolese
- Born: 18 December 1960 (age 64); Lubumbashi, Zaire

Sport
- Sport: Basketball

Kasala Kamanga (born 18 December 1960) is a Congolese basketball player. She competed in the women's tournament at the 1996 Summer Olympics.
