= Oksana Dovhaliuk =

Ukrainian basketball player

Personal information
- Nationality: Ukrainian
- Born: 13 August 1971 (age 53); Kyiv, Ukraine

Sport
- Sport: Basketball

Oksana Dovhaliuk (born 13 August 1971) is a Ukrainian basketball player. She competed in the women's tournament at the 1996 Summer Olympics.
