= Diana Sadovnykova =

Ukrainian basketball player

Personal information
- Nationality: Ukrainian
- Born: 26 July 1971 (age 53); Sevastopol, Ukraine

Sport
- Sport: Basketball

Diana Sadovnykova (born 26 July 1971) is a Ukrainian basketball player. She competed in the women's tournament at the 1996 Summer Olympics.
