= Tania Seino =

Cuban basketball player

Tania Seino (born 9 July 1973) is a Cuban former basketball player who competed in the 1996 Summer Olympics and in the 2000 Summer Olympics.
