= Yoo Young-joo =

South Korean basketball player

Personal information
- Nationality: South Korean
- Born: 23 November 1971 (age 53); Imsil, South Korea

Sport
- Sport: Basketball

Yoo Young-joo (born 23 November 1971) is a South Korean basketball player. She competed in the women's tournament at the 1996 Summer Olympics.
