= Alberto Ghibellini =

Italian water polo player

Personal information
- Full name: Alberto Marco Giovanni Ghibellini
- Born: 12 June 1973 (age 53) Genoa, Italy
Medal record
Men's water polo
Representing Italy
Olympic Games
Bronze medal – third place	1996 Atlanta	Team competition

Alberto Marco Giovanni Ghibellini (born 12 June 1973) is an Italian water polo player. He competed in the 1996 Summer Olympics, where the team won bronze, and in the 2000 Summer Olympics, where the team placed 5th. Ghibellini was born in Genoa.

== See also ==
- Italy men's Olympic water polo team records and statistics
- List of Olympic medalists in water polo (men)
