= Chun Eun-sook =

South Korean basketball player

Personal information
- Nationality: South Korean
- Born: 6 April 1969 (age 56); Busan, South Korea

Sport
- Sport: Basketball

Chun Eun-sook (born 6 April 1969) is a South Korean basketball player. She competed in the women's tournament at the 1996 Summer Olympics.
