= Giuseppina Tufano =

Italian basketball player (born 1965)

Personal information
- Nationality: Italian
- Born: 19 June 1965 (age 60) Somma Vesuviana, Italy

Sport
- Sport: Basketball

Giuseppina Tufano (born 19 June 1965) is an Italian basketball player. She competed in the women's tournament at the 1992 Summer Olympics and the 1996 Summer Olympics.
