= Irina Sumnikova =

Russian basketball player

Olympic medal record

Women's basketball

Representing the Soviet Union
Bronze medal – third place	1988 Seoul	Team competition

Representing the Unified Team
Gold medal – first place	1992 Barcelona	Team competition

Irina Sumnikova (née Sviridenko, born 15 October 1964 in Minsk, Belarusian SSR) is a Russian former basketball player who competed in the 1988 Summer Olympics, in the 1992 Summer Olympics, in the 1996 Summer Olympics, and in the 2000 Summer Olympics.

Her brother Georgi Sviridenko is a former handball player, who won gold medals at the 1988 Summer Olympics.
