= Viviana Ballabio =

Italian basketball player (born 1967)

Personal information
- Nationality: Italian
- Born: 26 July 1967 (age 57); Mariano Comense, Italy

Sport
- Sport: Basketball

Viviana Ballabio (born 26 July 1967) is an Italian basketball player. She competed in the women's tournament at the 1996 Summer Olympics.
