= Maryna Tkachenko =

Ukrainian basketball player

Personal information
- Born: 29 August 1965 (age 61) Mukachevo, Ukrainian SSR, Soviet Union
- Listed height: 1.85 m (6 ft 1 in)
Medals
Women's basketball
Olympic Games
Representing the Unified Team
Gold medal – first place	1992 Barcelona	Team competition
European Championships
Representing the Soviet Union
Gold medal – first place	1991 Israel	Team competition
Representing Ukraine
Gold medal – first place	1995 Czech Republic	Team competition

Maryna Ivanivna Tkachenko, also spelled Marina, (Ukrainian: Марина Іванівна Ткаченко, born 29 August 1965 in Mukachevo, Ukrainian SSR) is a Ukrainian basketball player. She won the gold medal at the 1992 Summer Olympics, with the Unified Team of twelve former Soviet Republics, and a fourth place at the 1996 Summer Olympics with the Ukrainian national team.

== Personal life ==
Maryna Tkachenko was married to Ukrainian basketball coach and criminal leader Ihor Tkachenko.
