= Olha Shliakhova =

Ukrainian basketball player

Personal information
- Nationality: Ukrainian
- Born: 8 April 1976 (age 49); Kharkiv, Ukraine

Sport
- Sport: Basketball

Olha Shliakhova (born 8 April 1976) is a Ukrainian basketball player. She competed in the women's tournament at the 1996 Summer Olympics.
