= Catarina Pollini =

Italian basketball player (born 1966)

Personal information
- Born: 16 March 1966 (age 60) Vicenza, Italy
- Listed height: 1.93 m (6 ft 4 in)

Career information
- College: Texas (1988–1989)
- WNBA draft: 1997: 4th round, 32nd overall pick
- Drafted by: Houston Comets
- Playing career: 1979–2006
- Position: Power forward / center

Career history
- 1979-1988: A.S. Vicenza
- 1989-1994: P.A. Cesena
- 1994-1998: ASDG Comense 1872
- 1997: Houston Comets
- 1999-2000: PF Schio
- 2000–2004: Ensino Lugo
- 2004–2005: Ros Casares Valencia
- 2005–2006: Ensino Lugo
- 2009: Ensino Lugo

Career highlights
- 7x European Champions Cup (1983, 1985-1988, 1991, 1995); 12x Italian League champion (1982-1988, 1990, 1995-1998); WNBA champion (1997); Ronchetti Cup champion (1994)
- Stats at Basketball Reference

Catarina Pollini (born 16 March 1966) is a retired Italian basketball player. She competed in the women's tournament at the 1992 Summer Olympics and the 1996 Summer Olympics.

Pollini also played one short season in the WNBA with the Houston Comets in 1997.

== Career ==
On 28 April 1997 Pollini was selected with the final pick (32nd overall) of the 1997 WNBA draft by the Houston Comets. Her debut game was played on 21 June 1997 in a 76 - 56 win over the Cleveland Rockers where she played for 8 minutes and recorded 2 rebounds and 1 assist but no points.

This 1997 season would be Pollini's only season in the WNBA. She played in 13 of the Comets' 28 games (playing in just 1 of the Comets' 15 final games from 22 July to 24 August) and averaged 1.7 points and 0.9 rebounds. Her 13th played game of that season on 1 August 1997 was her final game in the league. On that day, the Comets would blowout the Los Angeles Sparks, winning by 24 points (81 - 57) with Pollini playing for less than 2 minutes and recording no stats other than one foul.

Although she did not play in any playoff games, the Houston Comets won the first WNBA Championship in 1997 with Pollini as a member of the roster, thus making her a champion in her sole WNBA season.

== Career statistics ==
Legend
GP	Games played	GS	Games started	MPG	Minutes per game	RPG	Rebounds per game
APG	Assists per game	SPG	Steals per game	BPG	Blocks per game	PPG	Points per game
TO	Turnovers per game	FG%	Field-goal percentage	3P%	3-point field-goal percentage	FT%	Free-throw percentage
**Bold**	Career best	°	League leader

=== WNBA ===
==== Regular season ====
Year	Team	GP	GS	MPG	FG%	3P%	FT%	RPG	APG	SPG	BPG	TO	PPG
1997	Houston	13	0	7.2	36.4	0.0	50.0	0.9	0.4	0.3	0.1	0.6	1.7
Career	1 year, 1 team	13	0	7.2	36.4	0.0	50.0	0.9	0.4	0.3	0.1	0.6	1.7
