= Olena Zhyrko =

Ukrainian basketball player

Personal information
- Born: 16 February 1968 (age 58) Dnipropetrovsk, Ukrainian SSR, Soviet Union
Medals
Women's basketball
Olympic Games
Representing the Unified Team
Gold medal – first place	1992 Barcelona	Team competition
European Championships
Representing the Soviet Union
Gold medal – first place	1991 Israel	Team competition
Representing Ukraine
Gold medal – first place	1995 Czech Republic	Team competition

Olena Zhyrko (born 16 February 1968) is a Ukrainian basketball player. She competed in the women's tournament at the 1992 Summer Olympics and the 1996 Summer Olympics. She played for Stal Dnipropetrovsk from 1984 to 1989, WBC Dynamo Kyiv from 1989 to 1993, for Skif Kyiv in 1994 and for MBK Ružomberok (1994-2000) in Slovakia, Gambrinus Brno (2001) in the Czech Republic and Istrobanka (2002-2003) in Slovakia.
