= Liudmyla Nazarenko =

Ukrainian basketball player

Personal information
- Nationality: Ukrainian
- Born: 4 October 1965 (age 60) Kyiv, Ukraine

Sport
- Sport: Basketball
Medal record
Women's basketball
Representing Ukraine
European Championships
| Gold medal – first place | 1995 Czech Republic | Team competition |

Liudmyla Nazarenko (born 13 March 1967) is a Ukrainian basketball player. She competed in the women's tournament at the 1996 Summer Olympics.
