= Ukraine women's national basketball team =

Representative for Ukraine in international women's basketball competitions

Ukraine
- FIBA ranking: 43 ▼2 (14 September 2026)
- Joined FIBA: 1992
- FIBA zone: FIBA Europe
- National federation: FBU
- Coach: Yevgen Murzin

Olympic Games
- Appearances: 1
- Medals: None

World Cup
- Appearances: None

EuroBasket Women
- Appearances: 9
- Medals: (gold) Gold: (1995)
| Home | Away |

First international
- Israel 64–77 Ukraine (Antalya, Turkey; 13 May 1993)

Biggest win
- Ukraine 93–39 Germany (Kyiv, Ukraine; 20 August 2008)

Biggest defeat
- Serbia 82–40 Ukraine (Belgrade, Serbia; 9 November 2023)

The Ukraine women's national basketball team (Ukrainian: Жіноча збірна України з баскетболу) represents Ukraine in international women's basketball. They are controlled by the Basketball Federation of Ukraine (FBU).

As of late 2019, its team captain has been Alina Iagupova.

== Competitive record ==
=== Olympic Games ===
- 1996 – 4th place

=== EuroBasket Women ===
- 1995 – Champions
- 1997 – 10th place
- 2001 – 11th place
- 2003 – 11th place
- 2009 – 13th place
- 2013 – 16th place
- 2015 – 16th place
- 2017 – 10th place
- 2019 – 16th place

== Current roster ==
Roster for the FIBA Women's EuroBasket 2019.

Ukraine women's national basketball team roster
Players
Coaches

| Pos. | No. | Name | Age – Date of birth | Height | Club | Ctr. |
|---|---|---|---|---|---|---|
| SF | 5 | Viktoriya Kondus | 22 – 11 March 1997 | 1.80 m (5 ft 11 in) | Kyiv-Basket | (Ukraine) |
| SG | 7 | Vladyslava Voloshyna | 1,819 – 6 March 200 | 1.80 m (5 ft 11 in) |
| SG | 8 | Vita Horobets | 23 – 6 April 1996 | 1.80 m (5 ft 11 in) | BC Namur-Capitale | (Belgium) |
| SF | 9 | Alexandra Radulović | 33 – 4 April 1986 | 1.85 m (6 ft 1 in) |
| PF | 11 | Miriam Uro-Nile | 24 – 21 October 1994 | 1.89 m (6 ft 2 in) | Energa Toruń | (Poland) |
| F | 12 | Olha Yatskovets | 21 – 16 October 1997 | 1.89 m (6 ft 2 in) | MBK Ružomberok | (Slovakia) |
| PF | 13 | Olesia Malashenko | 28 – 21 February 1991 | 1.89 m (6 ft 2 in) | BC Castors Braine | (Belgium) |
| PF | 19 | Taisiia Udodenko | 30 – 7 May 1989 | 1.90 m (6 ft 3 in) | Ślęza Wrocław | (Poland) |
| SF | 23 | Alina Iagupova | 27 – 9 February 1992 | 1.86 m (6 ft 1 in) | Çukurova Basketbol | (Turkey) |
| F | 31 | Anna Olkhovyk | 32 – 18 June 1987 | 1.86 m (6 ft 1 in) |
| SF | 32 | Liudmyla Naumenko | 25 – 30 June 1993 | 1.88 m (6 ft 2 in) | Çukurova Basketbol | (Turkey) |
| PG | 88 | Arina Bilotserkivska | 29 – 3 December 1989 | 1.70 m (5 ft 7 in) | Ostrów Wielkopolski | (Poland) |

Head coach

- (Montenegro) Goran Bošković

Assistant coach(es)

- (Ukraine) Inna Kochubei

Legend

- Club – describes last
  club before the tournament
- Age – describes age
  on 27 June 2019

== Head coach position ==
- (Montenegro) Goran Bošković – (2017–2019)
- (Montenegro) Srđan Radulović – (2019–2023)
- (Ukraine) Evgen Murzin – (2024–present)

== See also ==
- Ukraine women's national under-20 basketball team
- Ukraine women's national under-18 basketball team
- Ukraine women's national under-16 basketball team
