= Forbes Arena =

Indoor arena in Atlanta, Georgia

- Interactive map of Forbes Arena
- Address: 830 Westview Dr SW
- Location: Atlanta, Georgia, U.S.
- Coordinates: 33.748471°N 84.417106°W
- Owner: Morehouse College
- Capacity: 6,000

Construction
- Opened: 1996
- Cost: $8 million

Tenants
- Morehouse College Maroon Tigers (1996–present); Atlanta Glory (ABL) (1996–1998)

Website
- Venue Website

The Forbes Arena is a 6,000-seat multi-purpose arena in Atlanta, Georgia, USA. It is home to the Morehouse College Maroon Tigers basketball team. It also hosted basketball preliminary matches during the 1996 Summer Olympics and was the home arena to the Atlanta Glory. It was opened in 1996 at a cost of $8 million. It sits adjacent to the college's old gym, Archer Hall, which seats 1,000.

The arena was named after Frank Forbes, an athletic director at Morehouse College and the school's first basketball coach.
