= 1998 World Wrestling Championships – Men's Greco-Roman 58 kg =

Men's Greco-Roman 58 kg at the 1998 World Championships
- Venue: Gavlerinken
- Dates: 28–30 August 1998
- Competitors: 34 from 34 nations

Medalists
gold medal	Kim In-sub	South Korea
silver medal	Sheng Zetian	China
bronze medal	Armen Nazaryan	Bulgaria

The men's Greco-Roman 58 kilograms is a competition featured at the 1998 World Wrestling Championships, and was held at the Gavlerinken in Gävle, Sweden from 28 to 30 August 1998.

== Results ==
Legend

- WO — Won by walkover

=== Round 1 ===
	Score	
Round of 64
Rafik Simonyan (RUS)	6–3	Igor Petrenko (BLR)
Terho Kettunen (FIN)	0–1	István Majoros (HUN)
Zakaria Nashed (SYR)	2–0	Ralph Zentgraf (AUT)
Grigore Buliga (MDA)	1–6 Fall	Kenkichi Nishimi (JPN)
Aigars Jansons (LAT)	0–3	Mehdi Nassiri (IRI)
Sheng Zetian (CHN)	3–2	Jambul Putkaradze (GEO)
Artur Sargsyan (ARM)	14–0	Federico Primelli (ITA)
Peter Stjernberg (SWE)	0–7	Alexander Khudish (ISR)
Yuriy Melnichenko (KAZ)	3–1	Armen Nazaryan (BUL)
David Maia (POR)	0–0	Rıfat Yıldız (GER)
Kim In-sub (KOR)	4–0	Sarkis Elgkian (GRE)
Djamel Ainaoui (FRA)	2–3	Constantin Borăscu (ROM)
Janno Kruusman (EST)	0–10	Asliddin Khudoyberdiev (UZB)
Víctor Capacho (COL)	0–5	Dennis Hall (USA)
Remigijus Šukevičius (LTU)	4–9	Ergüder Bekişdamat (TUR)
Grzegorz Szyszka (POL)	10–0	Jože Vrbančič (SLO)
Oleksandr Stepanyan (UKR)	10–0	Dennie van den Heiligenberg (NED)

=== Round 2 ===
	Score	
Round of 32
Rafik Simonyan (RUS)	2–0	István Majoros (HUN)
Zakaria Nashed (SYR)	0–8	Kenkichi Nishimi (JPN)
Mehdi Nassiri (IRI)	0–9	Sheng Zetian (CHN)
Artur Sargsyan (ARM)	12–0	Alexander Khudish (ISR)
Yuriy Melnichenko (KAZ)	5–4	Rıfat Yıldız (GER)
Kim In-sub (KOR)	8–2	Constantin Borăscu (ROM)
Asliddin Khudoyberdiev (UZB)	9–1	Dennis Hall (USA)
Ergüder Bekişdamat (TUR)	2–0	Grzegorz Szyszka (POL)
Oleksandr Stepanyan (UKR)		Bye
Repechage
Igor Petrenko (BLR)	6–0	Terho Kettunen (FIN)
Ralph Zentgraf (AUT)	3–1	Grigore Buliga (MDA)
Aigars Jansons (LAT)	8–0	Jambul Putkaradze (GEO)
Federico Primelli (ITA)	0–12	Peter Stjernberg (SWE)
Armen Nazaryan (BUL)	11–0	David Maia (POR)
Sarkis Elgkian (GRE)	5–4	Djamel Ainaoui (FRA)
Janno Kruusman (EST)	4–0	Víctor Capacho (COL)
Remigijus Šukevičius (LTU)	3–0 Ret	Jože Vrbančič (SLO)
Dennie van den Heiligenberg (NED)		Bye

=== Round 3 ===
	Score	
Round of 16
Oleksandr Stepanyan (UKR)	0–4	Rafik Simonyan (RUS)
Kenkichi Nishimi (JPN)	4–5	Sheng Zetian (CHN)
Artur Sargsyan (ARM)	0–5	Yuriy Melnichenko (KAZ)
Kim In-sub (KOR)	2–0	Asliddin Khudoyberdiev (UZB)
Ergüder Bekişdamat (TUR)		Bye
Repechage
Dennie van den Heiligenberg (NED)	0–12	Igor Petrenko (BLR)
Ralph Zentgraf (AUT)	2–3	Aigars Jansons (LAT)
Peter Stjernberg (SWE)	0–12	Armen Nazaryan (BUL)
Sarkis Elgkian (GRE)	6–0	Janno Kruusman (EST)
Remigijus Šukevičius (LTU)	4–5	István Majoros (HUN)
Zakaria Nashed (SYR)	1–6 Fall	Mehdi Nassiri (IRI)
Alexander Khudish (ISR)	5–0 Ret	Rıfat Yıldız (GER)
Constantin Borăscu (ROM)	6–2	Dennis Hall (USA)
Grzegorz Szyszka (POL)		Bye

=== Round 4 ===
	Score	
Quarterfinals
Ergüder Bekişdamat (TUR)	2–4	Rafik Simonyan (RUS)
Sheng Zetian (CHN)		Bye
Yuriy Melnichenko (KAZ)		Bye
Kim In-sub (KOR)		Bye
Repechage
Grzegorz Szyszka (POL)	2–3	Igor Petrenko (BLR)
Aigars Jansons (LAT)	0–6	Armen Nazaryan (BUL)
Sarkis Elgkian (GRE)	2–2	István Majoros (HUN)
Alexander Khudish (ISR)	0–3	Constantin Borăscu (ROM)
Oleksandr Stepanyan (UKR)	3–1	Kenkichi Nishimi (JPN)
Artur Sargsyan (ARM)	4–5	Asliddin Khudoyberdiev (UZB)

=== Round 5 ===
	Score	
Semifinals
Rafik Simonyan (RUS)	2–8	Sheng Zetian (CHN)
Yuriy Melnichenko (KAZ)	4–6	Kim In-sub (KOR)
Repechage
Igor Petrenko (BLR)	0–14	Armen Nazaryan (BUL)
István Majoros (HUN)	0–3	Constantin Borăscu (ROM)
Oleksandr Stepanyan (UKR)	6–0 Fall	Ergüder Bekişdamat (TUR)
Asliddin Khudoyberdiev (UZB)		Bye

=== Round 6 ===
	Score	
Repechage
Asliddin Khudoyberdiev (UZB)	2–3	Armen Nazaryan (BUL)
Constantin Borăscu (ROM)	3–1	Oleksandr Stepanyan (UKR)

=== Round 7 ===
	Score	
Repechage
Rafik Simonyan (RUS)	0–9	Armen Nazaryan (BUL)
Constantin Borăscu (ROM)	1–5	Yuriy Melnichenko (KAZ)

=== Finals ===
	Score	
Bronze medal match
Armen Nazaryan (BUL)	WO	Yuriy Melnichenko (KAZ)
Final
Sheng Zetian (CHN)	0–2	Kim In-sub (KOR)
