= 1999 World Wrestling Championships – Men's Greco-Roman 58 kg =

Men's Greco-Roman 58 kg at the 1999 World Championships
- Venue: Peace and Friendship Stadium
- Dates: 24–26 September 1999
- Competitors: 38 from 38 nations

Medalists
| gold medal | Kim In-sub | South Korea |
| silver medal | Yuriy Melnichenko | Kazakhstan |
| bronze medal | Armen Nazaryan | Bulgaria |

The men's Greco-Roman 58 kilograms is a competition featured at the 1999 World Wrestling Championships, and was held at the Peace and Friendship Stadium in Piraeus, Athens, Greece from 24 to 26 September 1999.

== Results ==
=== Preliminary round ===
==== Pool 1 ====
| Pos | Athlete | Pld | W | L | CP | TP | IRI | PRK | AUS |
|---|---|---|---|---|---|---|---|---|---|
| 1 | Ali Ashkani (IRI) | 2 | 2 | 0 | 7 | 21 | — | 7–6 | 14–0 Fall |
| 2 | Kim Myong-bok (PRK) | 2 | 1 | 1 | 5 | 17 | 1–3 PP | — | 11–0 |
| 3 | Boban Petrov (AUS) | 2 | 0 | 2 | 0 | 0 | 0–4 TO | 0–4 ST | — |

Source: Official website

==== Pool 2 ====
| Pos | Athlete | Pld | W | L | CP | TP | CHN | JPN | FRA |
|---|---|---|---|---|---|---|---|---|---|
| 1 | Sheng Zetian (CHN) | 2 | 2 | 0 | 6 | 13 | — | 7–0 | 6–0 |
| 2 | Kenkichi Nishimi (JPN) | 2 | 1 | 1 | 4 | 2 | 0–3 PO | — | 2–1 Fall |
| 3 | Djamel Ainaoui (FRA) | 2 | 0 | 2 | 0 | 1 | 0–3 PO | 0–4 TO | — |

Source: Official website

==== Pool 3 ====
| Pos | Athlete | Pld | W | L | CP | TP | SWE | FIN | AUT |
|---|---|---|---|---|---|---|---|---|---|
| 1 | Joel Carlsson (SWE) | 2 | 2 | 0 | 6 | 7 | — | 4–2 | 3–0 |
| 2 | Marko Isokoski (FIN) | 2 | 1 | 1 | 5 | 7 | 1–3 PP | — | 5–0 Fall |
| 3 | Thomas Kathan (AUT) | 2 | 0 | 2 | 0 | 0 | 0–3 PO | 0–4 TO | — |

Source: Official website

==== Pool 4 ====
| Pos | Athlete | Pld | W | L | CP | TP | KAZ | MDA | PHI |
|---|---|---|---|---|---|---|---|---|---|
| 1 | Yuriy Melnichenko (KAZ) | 2 | 2 | 0 | 8 | 14 | — | 11–1 | 3–0 Fall |
| 2 | Ilie Ceban (MDA) | 2 | 1 | 1 | 5 | 14 | 1–4 SP | — | 13–0 |
| 3 | Melchor Tumasis (PHI) | 2 | 0 | 2 | 0 | 0 | 0–4 TO | 0–4 ST | — |

Source: Official website

==== Pool 5 ====
| Pos | Athlete | Pld | W | L | CP | TP | UKR | POL | TUR |
|---|---|---|---|---|---|---|---|---|---|
| 1 | Parviz Kasimov (UKR) | 2 | 2 | 0 | 6 | 7 | — | 4–1 | 3–0 |
| 2 | Jerzy Szeibinger (POL) | 2 | 1 | 1 | 4 | 4 | 1–3 PP | — | 3–0 |
| 3 | Erkan Dündar (TUR) | 2 | 0 | 2 | 0 | 0 | 0–3 PO | 0–3 PO | — |

Source: Official website

==== Pool 6 ====
| Pos | Athlete | Pld | W | L | CP | TP | UZB | LAT | TPE |
|---|---|---|---|---|---|---|---|---|---|
| 1 | Dilshod Aripov (UZB) | 2 | 2 | 0 | 7 | 20 | — | 9–5 | 11–0 Fall |
| 2 | Aigars Jansons (LAT) | 2 | 1 | 1 | 5 | 11 | 1–3 PP | — | 6–0 Fall |
| 3 | Tseng Po-lang (TPE) | 2 | 0 | 2 | 0 | 0 | 0–4 TO | 0–4 TO | — |

Source: Official website

==== Pool 7 ====
| Pos | Athlete | Pld | W | L | CP | TP | KOR | RUS | VEN |
|---|---|---|---|---|---|---|---|---|---|
| 1 | Kim In-sub (KOR) | 2 | 2 | 0 | 7 | 20 | — | 4–2 | 16–0 Fall |
| 2 | Valery Nikonorov (RUS) | 2 | 1 | 1 | 5 | 18 | 1–3 PP | — | 16–0 |
| 3 | Jairo Alvarado (VEN) | 2 | 0 | 2 | 0 | 0 | 0–4 TO | 0–4 ST | — |

Source: Official website

==== Pool 8 ====
| Pos | Athlete | Pld | W | L | CP | TP | ARM | MEX | POR |
|---|---|---|---|---|---|---|---|---|---|
| 1 | Karen Mnatsakanyan (ARM) | 2 | 2 | 0 | 8 | 23 | — | 12–1 | 11–0 |
| 2 | Armando Fernández (MEX) | 2 | 1 | 1 | 4 | 5 | 1–4 SP | — | 4–3 |
| 3 | David Maia (POR) | 2 | 0 | 2 | 1 | 3 | 0–4 ST | 1–3 PP | — |

Source: Official website

==== Pool 9 ====
| Pos | Athlete | Pld | W | L | CP | TP | GER | GEO | CUB |
|---|---|---|---|---|---|---|---|---|---|
| 1 | Rıfat Yıldız (GER) | 2 | 1 | 1 | 4 | 6 | — | 4–2 | 2–4 |
| 2 | Koba Guliashvili (GEO) | 2 | 1 | 1 | 4 | 6 | 1–3 PP | — | 4–0 |
| 3 | Roberto Monzón (CUB) | 2 | 1 | 1 | 3 | 4 | 3–1 PP | 0–3 PO | — |

Source: Official website

==== Pool 10 ====
| Pos | Athlete | Pld | W | L | CP | TP | HUN | ROM | NED |
|---|---|---|---|---|---|---|---|---|---|
| 1 | István Majoros (HUN) | 2 | 2 | 0 | 7 | 17 | — | 9–7 | 8–0 Fall |
| 2 | Constantin Borăscu (ROM) | 2 | 1 | 1 | 5 | 22 | 1–3 PP | — | 15–0 Fall |
| 3 | Arash Rayhaniasl (NED) | 2 | 0 | 2 | 0 | 0 | 0–4 TO | 0–4 TO | — |

Source: Official website

==== Pool 11 ====
| Pos | Athlete | Pld | W | L | CP | TP | AZE | GRE | LTU | ISR |
|---|---|---|---|---|---|---|---|---|---|---|
| 1 | Vilayet Aghayev (AZE) | 3 | 3 | 0 | 9 | 14 | — | 3–0 | 4–3 | 7–2 |
| 2 | Efstathios Theodosiadis (GRE) | 3 | 2 | 1 | 6 | 4 | 0–3 PO | — | 1–1 | 3–0 |
| 3 | Remigijus Šukevičius (LTU) | 3 | 1 | 2 | 5 | 7 | 1–3 PP | 1–3 PP | — | 3–1 |
| 4 | Alexander Khudish (ISR) | 3 | 0 | 3 | 2 | 3 | 1–3 PP | 0–3 PO | 1–3 PP | — |

Source: Official website

==== Pool 12 ====
| Pos | Athlete | Pld | W | L | CP | TP | BUL | BLR | KGZ | USA |
|---|---|---|---|---|---|---|---|---|---|---|
| 1 | Armen Nazaryan (BUL) | 3 | 3 | 0 | 10 | 26 | — | 4–0 | 14–0 | 8–1 |
| 2 | Igor Petrenko (BLR) | 3 | 2 | 1 | 6 | 10 | 0–3 PO | — | 4–3 | 6–1 |
| 3 | Damirbek Asylbek Uulu (KGZ) | 3 | 1 | 2 | 4 | 7 | 0–4 ST | 1–3 PP | — | 4–1 |
| 4 | Dennis Hall (USA) | 3 | 0 | 3 | 3 | 3 | 1–3 PP | 1–3 PP | 1–3 PP | — |

Source: Official website

=== Knockout round ===
Round of 16
Ali Ashkani (IRI) | 4
Sheng Zetian (CHN) | 5
Joel Carlsson (SWE) | 0
Yuriy Melnichenko (KAZ) | 9
Rıfat Yıldız (GER) | 1
István Majoros (HUN) | 2
Vilayet Aghayev (AZE) | 1
Armen Nazaryan (BUL) | 6
Parviz Kasimov (UKR) | 2
Dilshod Aripov (UZB) | 3
Kim In-sub (KOR) | 10
Karen Mnatsakanyan (ARM) | 0
Aigars Jansons (LAT) | 2
Constantin Borăscu (ROM) | 3
Efstathios Theodosiadis (GRE) | 2
Igor Petrenko (BLR) | 13

Quarterfinals
Sheng Zetian (CHN) | 3
Yuriy Melnichenko (KAZ) | 5
István Majoros (HUN) | 1
Armen Nazaryan (BUL) | 3
Dilshod Aripov (UZB) | 0
Kim In-sub (KOR) | 3
Constantin Borăscu (ROM) | 3
Igor Petrenko (BLR) | 13

Semifinals
Yuriy Melnichenko (KAZ) | 3
Armen Nazaryan (BUL) | 0
Kim In-sub (KOR) | 10
Igor Petrenko (BLR) | 0

Final
Yuriy Melnichenko (KAZ) | 0
Kim In-sub (KOR) | 2
Bronze medal match
Armen Nazaryan (BUL) | 6
Igor Petrenko (BLR) | 0
