= 1997 World Wrestling Championships – Men's Greco-Roman 58 kg =

Men's Greco-Roman 58 kg at the 1997 World Championships
- Venue: Hala Ludowa
- Dates: 11–13 September 1997
- Competitors: 30 from 30 nations

Medalists
gold medal	Yuriy Melnichenko	Kazakhstan
silver medal	Rafik Simonyan	Russia
bronze medal	Armen Nazaryan	Bulgaria

The men's Greco-Roman 58 kilograms is a competition featured at the 1997 World Wrestling Championships, and was held in Wrocław, Poland from 11 to 13 September 1997.

== Results ==
Legend

- 3C — Won by 3 cautions given to the opponent
- WO — Won by walkover

=== Round 1 ===
	Score	
Round of 32
István Majoros (HUN)	0–4	Yuriy Melnichenko (KAZ)
Takashi Nishijima (JPN)	3–0	Zheng Haibo (CHN)
Vilayet Aghayev (AZE)	9–1	Armando Fernández (MEX)
Luis Palencia (VEN)	0–12	Timo Tuuri (FIN)
Grzegorz Szyszka (POL)	10–0	Petr Klikoš (CZE)
Park Chi-ho (KOR)	3–2	Constantin Borăscu (ROM)
Damirbek Chynaev (KGZ)	0–4	Djamel Ainaoui (FRA)
Luis Sarmiento (CUB)	5–4	Leoš Drmola (SVK)
Peter Stjernberg (SWE)	0–5	Sinan Hanlı (GER)
Ruslan Khakymov (UKR)	0–2	Dennis Hall (USA)
Rasim Niftaliev (BLR)	9–0 3C	Marko Kruusman (EST)
Rafik Simonyan (RUS)	5–2	Arutik Rubenian (GRE)
Koba Guliashvili (GEO)	5–0	Aigars Jansons (LAT)
David Maia (POR)	0–3	Ergüder Bekişdamat (TUR)
Víctor Capacho (COL)	0–10	Armen Nazaryan (BUL)

=== Round 2 ===
	Score	
Round of 16
Yuriy Melnichenko (KAZ)	6–0	Takashi Nishijima (JPN)
Vilayet Aghayev (AZE)	2–0	Timo Tuuri (FIN)
Grzegorz Szyszka (POL)	0–8	Park Chi-ho (KOR)
Djamel Ainaoui (FRA)	3–0	Luis Sarmiento (CUB)
Sinan Hanlı (GER)	0–6	Dennis Hall (USA)
Rasim Niftaliev (BLR)	3–7	Rafik Simonyan (RUS)
Koba Guliashvili (GEO)	10–0	Ergüder Bekişdamat (TUR)
Armen Nazaryan (BUL)		Bye
Repechage
István Majoros (HUN)	1–0	Zheng Haibo (CHN)
Armando Fernández (MEX)	14–2	Luis Palencia (VEN)
Petr Klikoš (CZE)	0–11	Constantin Borăscu (ROM)
Damirbek Chynaev (KGZ)	2–5	Leoš Drmola (SVK)
Peter Stjernberg (SWE)	2–8	Ruslan Khakymov (UKR)
Marko Kruusman (EST)	0–7	Arutik Rubenian (GRE)
Aigars Jansons (LAT)	5–0	David Maia (POR)
Víctor Capacho (COL)		Bye

=== Round 3 ===
	Score	
Quarterfinals
Armen Nazaryan (BUL)	4–6	Yuriy Melnichenko (KAZ)
Vilayet Aghayev (AZE)	8–3	Park Chi-ho (KOR)
Djamel Ainaoui (FRA)	2–3	Dennis Hall (USA)
Rafik Simonyan (RUS)	6–0	Koba Guliashvili (GEO)
Repechage
Víctor Capacho (COL)	0–3	István Majoros (HUN)
Armando Fernández (MEX)	2–12	Constantin Borăscu (ROM)
Leoš Drmola (SVK)	0–3	Ruslan Khakymov (UKR)
Arutik Rubenian (GRE)	3–0	Aigars Jansons (LAT)
Takashi Nishijima (JPN)	0–9	Timo Tuuri (FIN)
Grzegorz Szyszka (POL)	0–5	Luis Sarmiento (CUB)
Sinan Hanlı (GER)	1–0	Rasim Niftaliev (BLR)
Ergüder Bekişdamat (TUR)		Bye

=== Round 4 ===
	Score	
Repechage
Ergüder Bekişdamat (TUR)	2–1	István Majoros (HUN)
Constantin Borăscu (ROM)	0–10	Ruslan Khakymov (UKR)
Arutik Rubenian (GRE)	3–2	Timo Tuuri (FIN)
Luis Sarmiento (CUB)	4–1	Sinan Hanlı (GER)
Armen Nazaryan (BUL)	7–3	Park Chi-ho (KOR)
Djamel Ainaoui (FRA)	2–5	Koba Guliashvili (GEO)

=== Round 5 ===
	Score	
Semifinals
Yuriy Melnichenko (KAZ)	7–0	Vilayet Aghayev (AZE)
Dennis Hall (USA)	2–3	Rafik Simonyan (RUS)
Repechage
Ergüder Bekişdamat (TUR)	1–3	Ruslan Khakymov (UKR)
Arutik Rubenian (GRE)	4–3	Luis Sarmiento (CUB)
Armen Nazaryan (BUL)	11–0	Koba Guliashvili (GEO)

=== Round 6 ===
	Score	
Repechage
Ruslan Khakymov (UKR)	11–16	Armen Nazaryan (BUL)
Arutik Rubenian (GRE)		Bye

=== Round 7 ===
	Score	
Repechage
Vilayet Aghayev (AZE)	3–2	Arutik Rubenian (GRE)
Armen Nazaryan (BUL)	10–7	Dennis Hall (USA)

=== Finals ===
	Score	
5th place match
Arutik Rubenian (GRE)	WO	Dennis Hall (USA)
Bronze medal match
Vilayet Aghayev (AZE)	0–3	Armen Nazaryan (BUL)
Final
Yuriy Melnichenko (KAZ)	6–0	Rafik Simonyan (RUS)
