= Latvia at the 1996 Summer Olympics =

- IOC code: LAT
- NOC: Latvian Olympic Committee
- Website: www.olimpiade.lv (in Latvian and English)

in Atlanta
- Competitors: 47 (34 men and 13 women) in 12 sports
- Flag bearer: Einārs Tupurītis
- Medals Ranked 61st: Gold 0 Silver 1 Bronze 0 Total 1

Summer Olympics appearances (overview)
- 1924; 1928; 1932; 1936; 1948–1988; 1992; 1996; 2000; 2004; 2008; 2012; 2016; 2020; 2024

Other related appearances
- Russian Empire (1908–1912); Soviet Union (1952–1988)

Latvia was represented at the 1996 Summer Olympics in Atlanta, Georgia, United States by the Latvian Olympic Committee.

In total, 47 athletes including 34 men and 13 women represented Latvia in 12 different sports including athletics, boxing, canoeing, cycling, gymnastics, modern pentathlon, rowing, sailing, shooting, swimming, weightlifting and wrestling. Latvia won one medal at the games after Ivans Klementjevs claimed silver in the canoeing men's C-1 1000 m.

== Competitors ==
In total, 29 athletes represented Latvia at the 1996 Summer Olympics in Atlanta, Georgia, United States across 12 different sports.

Sport	Men	Women	Total
Athletic	11	6	17
Boxing	1	0	1
Canoeing	2	1	3
Cycling	7	0	7
Gymnastics	0	1	1
Mondern pentathlon	1	0	1
Rowing	2	2	4
Sailing	1	1	2
Shooting	2	0	2
Swimming	2	2	4
Weightlifting	5	0	5
Wrestling	1	0	1
Total	34	13	47

== Medalists ==
Latvia won one medal at the games when Ivans Klementjevs claimed silver in the canoeing men's C-1 1000 m.

== Athletics ==
In total, 17 Latvian athletes participated in the athletic events – Jeļena Blaževiča, Jeļena Čelnova, Aigars Fadejevs, Valentīna Gotovska, Sergejs Inšakovs, Lana Jēkabsone, Igors Kazanovs, Anita Liepiņa, Modris Liepiņš, Aleksandrs Obižajevs, Guntis Peders, Rojs Piziks, Aleksandrs Prokopčuks, Gundega Sproģe, Egīls Tēbelis and Einārs Tupurītis.

Men
Track & road events

Athlete	Event	Heat		Quarterfinal		Semifinal		Final	
Athlete	Event	Result	Rank	Result	Rank	Result	Rank	Result	Rank
Aigars Fadejevs	20 km walk	—						1:20:47	6
Sergejs Inšakovs	100 m	10.42	5	did not advance					
Sergejs Inšakovs	200 m	20.41	2 Q	20.58	4 Q	20.48	7	did not advance	
Igors Kazanovs	110 m hurdles	13.74	27 q	13.42	8 Q	14.13	7	did not advance	
Modris Liepiņš	50 km walk	—						4:01:12	23
Guntis Peders	110 m hurdles	13.72	25 Q	13.59	19	did not advance			
Aleksandrs Prokopčuks	Marathon	—						2:21.50	51
Einārs Tupurītis	800 m	1:45.88	2 Q	—		1:46.41	4	did not advance	
Egīls Tēbelis	400 m hurdles	50.73	4	did not advance					

Field events

Athlete	Event	Qualification		Final	
Athlete	Event	Distance	Position	Distance	Position
Aleksandrs Obižajevs	Pole vault	5.40	27	did not advance	

Combined events – Decathlon

Athlete	Event	100 m	LJ	SP	HJ	400 m	110H	DT	PV	JT	1500 m	Final	Rank
Rojs Piziks	Result	11.40	6.86	14.60	2.16	51.48	15.20	45.90	5.00	58.40	4:30.88	7994	23
Rojs Piziks	Points	774	781	765	953	748	825	785	910	714	739	7994	23

Women
Track & road events

Athlete	Event	Heat		Quarterfinal		Semifinal		Final	
Athlete	Event	Result	Rank	Result	Rank	Result	Rank	Result	Rank
Jeļena Čelnova	5000 m	15:59.00	12	did not advance					
Lana Jēkabsone	400 m hurdles	56.18	5	did not advance					
Anita Liepiņa	10 km walk	—						45:35	22

Field events

Athlete	Event	Qualification		Final	
Athlete	Event	Distance	Position	Distance	Position
Jeļena Blaževiča	Triple jump	14.24	10 Q	14.12	8
Valentīna Gotovska	Long jump	6.08	27	did not advance	
Gundega Sproģe	Triple jump	13.67	19	did not advance	

== Boxing ==
One Latvian athlete participated in the boxing events – Romāns Kukļins.

Men

Athlete	Event	Round of 32	Round of 16	Quarterfinals	Semifinals	Final	
Athlete	Event	Opposition Result	Opposition Result	Opposition Result	Opposition Result	Opposition Result	Rank
Romāns Kukļins	Heavyweight	Serguei Dychkov (BLR); L 6-16	did not advance				

== Canoeing ==
Three Latvian athletes participated in the canoeing events – Dzintra Blūma, Aldis Kļaviņš and Ivans Klementjevs.

=== Slalom ===
Athlete	Event	Preliminary				Final	
Athlete	Event	Run 1	Rank	Run 2	Rank	Best	Rank
Aldis Kļaviņš	Men's K-1	166.08	25	152.67	15	152.67	21
Dzintra Blūma	Women's K-1	DNF	AC	372.81	28	372.81	30

=== Sprint ===
Men

Athlete	Event	Heats		Repechages		Semifinals		Final	
Athlete	Event	Time	Rank	Time	Rank	Time	Rank	Time	Rank
Ivans Klementjevs	C-1 1000 m	4:24.678	3 QS	—		4:10.455	1 Q	3:54.954	Silver medal

== Cycling ==
Seven Latvian athletes participated in the cycling events – Viesturs Bērziņš, Ainārs Ķiksis, Kaspars Ozers, Dainis Ozols, Arvis Piziks, Juris Silovs and Romāns Vainšteins.

=== Road ===
Athlete	Event	Time	Rank
Kaspars Ozers	Men's road race	04:56:43	22
Dainis Ozols	Men's road race	04:56:51	92
Arvis Piziks	Men's road race	04:56:33	18
Juris Silovs	Men's road race	04:56:44	31
Romāns Vainšteins	Men's road race	04:56:54	106

=== Track ===
Time trial

Athlete	Event	Time	Rank
Ainārs Ķiksis	Men's time trial	1:05.457	8

Sprint

Athlete	Event	Qualification		1st round	Repechage	2nd round	Repechage	3rd round	Repechage	Quarterfinals	Classification 5-8	Semifinals	Final
Athlete	Event	Time	Rank	Opposition Time	Opposition Time	Opposition Time	Opposition Time	Opposition Time	Opposition Time	Opposition Time	Opposition Time	Opposition Time	Rank
Viesturs Bērziņš	Men's sprint	10.463	9 Q	Martin Hrbacek (SVK); W 11.008	BYE	Roberto Chiappa (ITA); W 11.044	BYE	Jens Fiedler (GER); L 10.808	Frédéric Magné (FRA); Pavel Buráň (CZE); L 10.808	did not advance			

== Gymnastics ==
One Latvian athlete participated in the gymnastics events – Ludmila Prince.

Women

Athlete	Event	Qualification						Final					
Athlete	Event	Apparatus				Total	Rank	Apparatus				Total	Rank
Athlete	Event	V	UB	BB	F	Total	Rank	V	UB	BB	F	Total	Rank
Ludmila Prince	Individual all-around	9.4759.537	9.0009.150	8.4128.700	9.3629.550	73.186	58	did not advance					

== Modern pentathlon ==
One Latvian athlete participated in the modern pentathlon events – Vjačeslavs Duhanovs.

Men

Athlete	Event	Shooting (10 m air pistol)			Swimming (200 m freestyle)			Fencing (épée one touch)			Riding (show jumping)			Running (3000 m)			Total points	Final rank
Athlete	Event	Points	Rank	MP Points	Time	Rank	MP points	Wins	Rank	MP points	Penalties	Rank	MP points	Time	Rank	MP Points	Total points	Final rank
Vjačeslavs Duhanovs	Men's	173	20	1012	3:23.29	17	1248	15	18	790	150	18	950	13:13.380	17	1186	5186	22

== Rowing ==
Four Latvian athletes participated in the rowing events – Uģis Lasmanis, Liene Lutere, Sanita Ozoliņa and Andris Reinholds.

Men

Athlete	Event	Heats		Repechage		Semifinals C-D		Semifinals		Final	
Athlete	Event	Time	Rank	Time	Rank	Time	Rank	Time	Rank	Time	Rank
Uģis Lasmanis; Andris Reinholds	Double sculls	6:52.80	2 R	6:51.19	1 SA/B	—		6:40.68	5 FB	6:20.82	9

Women

Athlete	Event	Heats		Repechage		Semifinals C-D		Semifinals		Final	
Athlete	Event	Time	Rank	Time	Rank	Time	Rank	Time	Rank	Time	Rank
Sanita Ozoliņa; Liene Lutere	Double sculls	7:36.18	4 R	7:48.02	2 SA/B	—		7:32.00	6 FB	7:06.47	11

== Sailing ==
Two Latvian athletes participated in the sailing events – Ansis Dāle and Ilona Dzelme.

Men

Athlete	Event	Race									Net points	Final rank
Athlete	Event	1	2	3	4	5	6	7	8	9	Net points	Final rank
Ansis Dāle	Mistral	24	25	~~29~~	20	6	22	24	29	13	134.0	20

Women

Athlete	Event	Race									Net points	Final rank
Athlete	Event	1	2	3	4	5	6	7	8	9	Net points	Final rank
Ilona Dzelme	Mistral	20	19	20	15	17	~~25~~	17	17	8	113.0	18

== Shooting ==
Two Latvian athletes participated in the shooting events – Afanasijs Kuzmins and Boriss Timofejevs.

Men

Athlete	Event	Qualification		Final	
Athlete	Event	Score	Rank	Score	Rank
Afanasijs Kuzmins	25 m rapid fire pistol	585	10	did not advance	
Afanasijs Kuzmins	10 m air pistol	574	29	did not advance	
Boriss Timofejevs	Skeet	122	6 Q	145	6

== Swimming ==
Four Latvian athletes participated in the swimming events – Artūrs Jakovļevs, Margarita Kalmikova, Valērijs Kalmikovs and Agnese Ozoliņa.

Men

Athlete	Event	Heat		Final B		Final	
Athlete	Event	Time	Rank	Time	Rank	Time	Rank
Artūrs Jakovļevs	100 m butterfly	56.62	49	did not advance			
Valērijs Kalmikovs	200 m breaststroke	2:17.07	17 q	2:16.23	13	did not advance	
Valērijs Kalmikovs	200 m individual medley	2:06.16	21	did not advance			
Valērijs Kalmikovs	400 m individual medley	4:28.04	18	did not advance			

Women

Athlete	Event	Heat		Final B		Final	
Athlete	Event	Time	Rank	Time	Rank	Time	Rank
Margarita Kalmikova	200 m breaststroke	2:39.63	31	did not advance			
Agnese Ozoliņa	50 m freestyle	27.65	47	did not advance			

== Weightlifting ==
Five Latvian athletes participated in the weightlifting events – Raimonds Bergmanis, Vladimirs Morozovs, Viktors Ščerbatihs, Ivars Zdanovskis and Dainis Zīlītis.

Men

Athlete	Event	Snatch		Clean & Jerk		Total	Rank
Athlete	Event	Result	Rank	Result	Rank	Total	Rank
Vladimirs Morozovs	−54 kg	100.0	19	122.5	19	222.5	19
Dainis Zīlītis	−83 kg	145.0	15	167.5	15	312.5	15
Ivars Zdanovskis	−99 kg	150.0	22	187.5	19	337.5	20
Viktors Ščerbatihs	−108 kg	177.5	12	212.5	11	390.0	10
Raimonds Bergmanis	+108 kg	177.5	12	225.0	10	402.5	9

== Wrestling ==
One Latvian athlete participated in the wrestling events – Aigars Jansons.

Men's Greco-Roman

Athlete	Event	Elimination Pool							Final round	
Athlete	Event	Round 1 Result	Round 2 Result	Round 3 Result	Round 4 Result	Round 5 Result	Round 6 Result	Rank	Final round Result	Rank
Aigars Jansons	−57 kg	Stanisław Pawłowski (POL); W 4-3	Sheng Zetian (CHN); L 1-7	Park Chi-ho (KOR); W 9-2	Ruslan Khakymov (UKR); L 4-9	—		9	did not advance	
