= Wrestling at the 2000 Summer Olympics – Men's Greco-Roman 58 kg =

Men's Greco-Roman 58 kg at the Games of the XXVII Olympiad
- Venue: Sydney Convention and Exhibition Centre
- Date: 25–27 September 2000
- Competitors: 20 from 20 nations

Medalists
1st place, gold medalist(s)		Armen Nazaryan	Bulgaria
2nd place, silver medalist(s)		Kim In-sub	South Korea
3rd place, bronze medalist(s)		Sheng Zetian	China

The men's Greco-Roman 58 kilograms at the 2000 Summer Olympics as part of the wrestling program was held at the Sydney Convention and Exhibition Centre from September 25 to 27. The competition was held with an elimination system of three or four wrestlers in each pool, with the winners qualifying for the quarterfinals, semifinals and final by way of direct elimination.

== Schedule ==
All times are Australian Eastern Daylight Time (UTC+11:00)

Date	Time	Event
25 September 2000	09:30	Round 1
25 September 2000	17:00	Round 2
26 September 2000	09:30	Round 3
27 September 2000	09:30	Quarterfinals
27 September 2000	09:30	Semifinals
27 September 2000	17:00	Finals

== Results ==
Legend

- 3C — Won by 3 cautions given to the opponent
- F — Won by fall
- WO — Won by walkover

=== Elimination pools ===
==== Pool 1 ====
Pos	Athlete	Pld	W	L	CP	TP
1	Kim In-sub (KOR)	2	2	0	6	10
2	Dilshod Aripov (UZB)	2	1	1	5	2
3	Yuriy Melnichenko (KAZ)	2	0	2	0	0

Source: Official Report

	Score		CP
Yuriy Melnichenko (KAZ)	0–6	Kim In-sub (KOR)	0–3 PO
Dilshod Aripov (UZB)	WO	Yuriy Melnichenko (KAZ)	4–0 PA
Kim In-sub (KOR)	4–2	Dilshod Aripov (UZB)	3–1 PP

==== Pool 2 ====
Pos	Athlete	Pld	W	L	CP	TP
1	Ali Ashkani (IRI)	2	2	0	6	12
2	Koba Guliashvili (GEO)	2	1	1	3	3
3	István Majoros (HUN)	2	0	2	1	1

Source: Official Report

	Score		CP
István Majoros (HUN)	1–5	Ali Ashkani (IRI)	1–3 PP
Koba Guliashvili (GEO)	3–0	István Majoros (HUN)	3–0 PO
Ali Ashkani (IRI)	7–0	Koba Guliashvili (GEO)	3–0 PO

==== Pool 3 ====
Pos	Athlete	Pld	W	L	CP	TP
1	Jim Gruenwald (USA)	2	2	0	6	8
2	Igor Petrenko (BLR)	2	1	1	3	4
3	Karen Mnatsakanyan (ARM)	2	0	2	2	5

Source: Official Report

	Score		CP
Karen Mnatsakanyan (ARM)	2–4	Igor Petrenko (BLR)	1–3 PP
Jim Gruenwald (USA)	4–3	Karen Mnatsakanyan (ARM)	3–1 PP
Igor Petrenko (BLR)	0–4	Jim Gruenwald (USA)	0–3 PO

==== Pool 4 ====
Pos	Athlete	Pld	W	L	CP	TP
1	Sheng Zetian (CHN)	2	2	0	7	11
2	Djamel Ainaoui (FRA)	2	1	1	3	7
3	Oleksandr Stepanyan (UKR)	2	0	2	1	6

Source: Official Report

	Score		CP
Sheng Zetian (CHN)	1–0	Djamel Ainaoui (FRA)	3–0 PO
Oleksandr Stepanyan (UKR)	0–10	Sheng Zetian (CHN)	0–4 ST
Djamel Ainaoui (FRA)	7–6	Oleksandr Stepanyan (UKR)	3–1 PP

==== Pool 5 ====
Pos	Athlete	Pld	W	L	CP	TP
1	Armen Nazaryan (BUL)	3	3	0	11	28
2	Makoto Sasamoto (JPN)	3	2	1	7	30
3	Nepes Gukulow (TKM)	3	1	2	6	14
4	Brett Cash (AUS)	3	0	3	1	2

Source: Official Report

	Score		CP
Armen Nazaryan (BUL)	11–0	Makoto Sasamoto (JPN)	4–0 ST
Brett Cash (AUS)	0–10	Nepes Gukulow (TKM)	0–4 ST
Armen Nazaryan (BUL)	13–2	Brett Cash (AUS)	4–1 SP
Makoto Sasamoto (JPN)	5–3	Nepes Gukulow (TKM)	3–1 PP
Armen Nazaryan (BUL)	4–1	Nepes Gukulow (TKM)	3–1 PP
Makoto Sasamoto (JPN)	25–0	Brett Cash (AUS)	4–0 ST

==== Pool 6 ====
Pos	Athlete	Pld	W	L	CP	TP
1	Rıfat Yıldız (GER)	3	3	0	9	14
2	Valery Nikonorov (RUS)	3	2	1	8	19
3	Constantin Borăscu (ROM)	3	1	2	6	14
4	Mohamed Barguaoui (TUN)	3	0	3	0	0

Source: Official Report

	Score		CP
Mohamed Barguaoui (TUN)	0–4	Rıfat Yıldız (GER)	0–3 PO
Constantin Borăscu (ROM)	3–7	Valery Nikonorov (RUS)	1–3 PP
Mohamed Barguaoui (TUN)	0–7 Fall	Constantin Borăscu (ROM)	0–4 TO
Rıfat Yıldız (GER)	4–1	Valery Nikonorov (RUS)	3–1 PP
Mohamed Barguaoui (TUN)	0–11 3C	Valery Nikonorov (RUS)	0–4 EX
Rıfat Yıldız (GER)	6–4	Constantin Borăscu (ROM)	3–1 PP

=== Knockout round ===
Quarterfinals
Kim In-sub (KOR)	3
Ali Ashkani (IRI)	1
Jim Gruenwald (USA)	1
Sheng Zetian (CHN)	11

Semifinals
Kim In-sub (KOR)	4
Sheng Zetian (CHN)	0
Armen Nazaryan (BUL)	10
Rıfat Yıldız (GER)	0

Gold medal match
Kim In-sub (KOR)	3
Armen Nazaryan (BUL)	10^{F}
Bronze medal match
Sheng Zetian (CHN)	2
Rıfat Yıldız (GER)	0

Classification 5th–6th
Ali Ashkani (IRI)	3
Jim Gruenwald (USA)	2

== Final standing ==
Rank	Athlete
1st place, gold medalist(s)	Armen Nazaryan (BUL)
2nd place, silver medalist(s)	Kim In-sub (KOR)
3rd place, bronze medalist(s)	Sheng Zetian (CHN)
4	Rıfat Yıldız (GER)
5	Ali Ashkani (IRI)
6	Jim Gruenwald (USA)
7	Valery Nikonorov (RUS)
8	Makoto Sasamoto (JPN)
9	Constantin Borăscu (ROM)
10	Nepes Gukulow (TKM)
11	Dilshod Aripov (UZB)
12	Djamel Ainaoui (FRA)
13	Igor Petrenko (BLR)
14	Koba Guliashvili (GEO)
15	Karen Mnatsakanyan (ARM)
16	Oleksandr Stepanyan (UKR)
17	Brett Cash (AUS)
18	István Majoros (HUN)
19	Yuriy Melnichenko (KAZ)
20	Mohamed Barguaoui (TUN)
