= Lithuania at the 1996 Summer Olympics =

- IOC code: LTU
- NOC: Lithuanian National Olympic Committee
- Website: www.ltok.lt (in Lithuanian and English)

in Atlanta
- Competitors: 61 (45 men and 16 women) in 14 sports
- Flag bearer: Raimundas Mažuolis
- Medals Ranked 71st: Gold 0 Silver 0 Bronze 1 Total 1

Summer Olympics appearances (overview)
- 1924; 1928; 1932–1988; 1992; 1996; 2000; 2004; 2008; 2012; 2016; 2020; 2024

Other related appearances
- Russian Empire (1908–1912); Soviet Union (1952–1988)

Lithuania competed at the 1996 Summer Olympics in Atlanta, United States.

== Medalists ==
| Medal | Name | Sport | Event |
|---|---|---|---|
| Bronze | Arvydas Sabonis; Šarūnas Marčiulionis; Rimas Kurtinaitis; Gintaras Einikis; Artūras Karnišovas; Darius Lukminas; Saulius Štombergas; Eurelijus Žukauskas; Mindaugas Žukauskas; Andrius Jurkūnas; Rytis Vaišvila; Tomas Pačėsas | Basketball | Men's Team Competition |

== Athletics ==
Men
Track & road events

| Athlete | Event | Heat | | Quarterfinal | | Semifinal | | Final | |
| Athlete | Event | Result | Rank | Result | Rank | Result | Rank | Result | Rank |
|---|---|---|---|---|---|---|---|---|---|
| Pavelas Fedorenka | Marathon | — | | | | | | 2:25.41 | 70 |
| Valdas Kazlauskas | 20 km walk | — | | | | | | 1:28:33 | 44 |
| Česlovas Kundrotas | Marathon | — | | | | | | DNF | |
| Daugvinas Zujus | 50 km walk | — | | | | | | 4:23:35 | 35 |
| Dainius Virbickas | Marathon | — | | | | | | DNF | |

Field events

| Athlete | Event | Qualification | | Final | |
| Athlete | Event | Distance | Position | Distance | Position |
|---|---|---|---|---|---|
| Virgilijus Alekna | Discus throw | 64.5 | 2 Q | 65.30 | 5 |
| Vaclavas Kidykas | Discus throw | 62.74 | 7 Q | 62.78 | 8 |
| Saulius Kleiza | Shot put | 18.21 | 30 | Did not advance | |
| Audrius Raizgys | Triple jump | 16.38 | 23 | Did not advance | |

Women
Track & road events

| Athlete | Event | Heat | | Quarterfinal | | Semifinal | | Final | |
| Athlete | Event | Result | Rank | Result | Rank | Result | Rank | Result | Rank |
|---|---|---|---|---|---|---|---|---|---|
| Sonata Milušauskaitė | 10 km walk | — | | | | | | 48:05 | 37 |
| Stefanija Statkuvienė | Marathon | — | | | | | | 2:39.58 | 40 |

Field events

| Athlete | Event | Qualification | | Final | |
| Athlete | Event | Distance | Position | Distance | Position |
|---|---|---|---|---|---|
| Rita Ramanauskaitė | Javelin throw | 56.94 | 22 | Did not advance | |
| Nelė Žilinskienė | High jump | 1.93 | 1 Q | 1.96 (NR) | 5 |

Combined events – Heptathlon

| Athlete | Event | 100H | HJ | SP | 200 m | LJ | JT | 800 m | Final | Rank |
|---|---|---|---|---|---|---|---|---|---|---|
| Remigija Nazarovienė | Result | 13.59 | 1.74 | 13.83 | 24.51 | 6.33 | 42.68 | 2:12.61 | 6254 | 10 |
| Remigija Nazarovienė | Points | 1037 | 903 | 783 | 932 | 953 | 719 | 927 | 6254 | 10 |

== Basketball ==
=== Men's tournament ===
Team Roster

- Gintaras Einikis
- Artūras Karnišovas
- Rimas Kurtinaitis
- Darius Lukminas
- Šarūnas Marčiulionis
- Tomas Pačėsas
- Arvydas Sabonis
- Saulius Štombergas
- Rytis Vaišvila
- Eurelijus Žukauskas
- Mindaugas Žukauskas

Preliminary round

| Pos | Team | Pld | W | L | PF | PA | PD | Pts | Qualification |
|---|---|---|---|---|---|---|---|---|---|
| 1 | United States (H) | 5 | 5 | 0 | 522 | 345 | +177 | 10 | Quarterfinals |
| 2 | Lithuania | 5 | 3 | 2 | 427 | 354 | +73 | 8 (Note: Head-to-head record: Lithuania 1–0 Croatia) | Quarterfinals |
| 3 | Croatia | 5 | 3 | 2 | 422 | 386 | +36 | 8 | Quarterfinals |
| 4 | China | 5 | 2 | 3 | 360 | 502 | −142 | 7 (Note: Head-to-head record: China 1–0 Argentina) | Quarterfinals |
| 5 | Argentina | 5 | 2 | 3 | 351 | 396 | −45 | 7 | 9th place playoff |
| 6 | Angola | 5 | 0 | 5 | 280 | 379 | −99 | 5 | 11th place playoff |

Source: FIBA archive
Rules for classification: 1) points; 2) head-to-head points; 3) head-to-head goal average; 4) head-to-head number of points scored.
(H) Hosts
Notes:

20 July 1996

Report

| Lithuania | 83–81 (OT) | Croatia |
Scoring by half: 37–31, 29–35 Overtime: 6–6, 11–9
| Pts: Sabonis 20; Rebs: Sabonis 14; Asts: Vaišvila 6 | | Pts: Kukoč 33; Rebs: Rađa 12; Asts: Kukoč 6 |

Atlanta
Referees: Miguel Betancor Leon (ESP), Jose Lapaix Guance (DOM)

22 July 1996

Report

| Argentina | 65–61 | Lithuania |
Scoring by half: 31–25, 34–36
| Pts: Espil 25; Rebs: Espil 6 Asts: Milanesio 6 | | Pts: Sabonis 30; Rebs: Sabonis 11; Asts: Marčiulionis 8 |

Atlanta
Referees: Carl Jungebrand (FIN), Juan Figueroa (PUR)

24 July 1996

Report

| Lithuania | 82–104 | United States |
Scoring by half: 42–50, 40–54
| Pts: Einikis 21; Rebs: Karnišovas, Einikis 7 Asts: Pačėsas 5 | | Pts: Barkley 16; Rebs: Barkley 5 Asts: Stockton, Payton 7 |

Atlanta
Referees: Wieslaw Zych (POL), Jose Reyes Ronfini (MEX)

26 July 1996

Report

| Angola | 49–85 | Lithuania |
Scoring by half: 21–37, 28–48
| Pts: Â. Victoriano 18; Rebs: Moreira Dias 6 Asts: Carvalho 4 | | Pts: Karnišovas 20; Rebs: Sabonis 10; Asts: Sabonis 8 |

Atlanta
Referees: Jose Pelissari (BRA), Robert Barnett (AUS)

28 July 1996

Report

| China | 55–116 | Lithuania |
Scoring by half: 23–53, 32–63
| Pts: Wang 18; Rebs: Wang 5 Asts: Li 4 | | Pts: Štombergas 19; Rebs: Einikis 9 Asts: Marčiulionis 7 |

Atlanta
Referees: Jose Reyes Ronfini (MEX), Juan Figueroa (PUR)

Quarterfinals

30 July 1996
10:00

Report

| Lithuania | 99–66 | Greece |
Scoring by half: 45–19, 54–47
| Pts: Marčiulionis 16; Rebs: Sabonis 11; Asts: Marčiulionis 7 | | Pts: Sigalas 18; Rebs: Rentzias 4 Asts: Sigalas 5 |

Atlanta
Referees: Miguel Betancor Leon (ESP), Raul Chaves Sagel (ARG)

Semifinals

1 August 1996
20:00

Report

| FR Yugoslavia | 66–58 | Lithuania |
Scoring by half: 35–31, 31–27
| Pts: Danilović 19; Rebs: Divac 8 Asts: Bodiroga 4 | | Pts: Kurtinaitis 22; Rebs: Sabonis 13; Asts: Marčiulionis 6 |

Atlanta
Referees: Wieslaw Zych (POL), Jose Lapaix Guance (DOM)

Bronze medal game

3 August 1996
20:00

Report

| Lithuania | 80–74 | Australia |
Scoring by half: 36–34, 44–40
| Pts: Sabonis 30; Rebs: Sabonis 13; Asts: Marčiulionis 9 | | Pts: Gaze 25; Rebs: Bradtke 5 Asts: Heal 5 |

Atlanta
Referees: Joseph Derosa (USA), Juan Figueroa (PUR)

== Boxing ==
Men

| Athlete | Event | 1 Round | 2 Round | Quarterfinals | Semifinals | Final | |
| Athlete | Event | Opposition Result | Opposition Result | Opposition Result | Opposition Result | Opposition Result | Rank |
|---|---|---|---|---|---|---|---|
| Vitalijus Karpačiauskas | Welterweight | Hassan Mzonge (TAN); W 9-1 | Kamel Chater (TUN); L RSC-1 | Did not advance | | | |

== Canoeing ==
=== Sprint ===
Men

| Athlete | Event | Heats | | Repechage | | Semifinals | | Final | |
| Athlete | Event | Time | Rank | Time | Rank | Time | Rank | Time | Rank |
|---|---|---|---|---|---|---|---|---|---|
| Vidas Kupčinskas; Vaidas Mizeras | K-2 500 m | 1:36.685 | 5 QR | 1:40.500 | 5 QS | 1:32.693 | 8 | Did not advance | 15 |
| Vidas Kupčinskas; Vaidas Mizeras | K-2 1000 m | 3:51.842 | 7 QR | 3:38.428 | 4 QS | 3:24.462 | 8 | Did not advance | 16 |

== Cycling ==
=== Road ===
Men

| Athlete | Event | Time | Rank |
|---|---|---|---|
| Linas Balčiūnas | Men's road race | DNF | |
| Artūras Kasputis | Men's time trial | 1:07:47 | 21 |
| Remigijus Lupeikis | Men's road race | 04:56:52 | 95 |
| Remigijus Lupeikis | Men's time trial | 1:11:03 | 28 |
| Jonas Romanovas | Men's road race | DNF | |
| Raimondas Rumšas | Men's road race | DNF | |
| Raimondas Vilčinskas | Men's road race | DNF | |

Women

| Athlete | Event | Time | Rank |
|---|---|---|---|
| Jolanta Polikevičiūtė | Women's road race | 02:37:06 | 5 |
| Jolanta Polikevičiūtė | Women's time trial | 38:27 | 7 |
| Rasa Polikevičiūtė | Women's road race | 02:37:06 | 12 |
| Rasa Polikevičiūtė | Women's time trial | 38:53 | 12 |
| Diana Žiliūtė | Women's road race | DNF | |

=== Track ===
Sprint

| Athlete | Event | Qualification | | Round 1 | Repechage 1 | Quarterfinals | Classification 5-8 | Semifinals | Final | |
| Athlete | Event | Time Speed (km/h) | Rank | Opposition Time Speed (km/h) | Opposition Time Speed (km/h) | Opposition Time Speed (km/h) | Opposition Time Speed (km/h) | Opposition Time Speed (km/h) | Opposition Time Speed (km/h) | Rank |
|---|---|---|---|---|---|---|---|---|---|---|
| Rita Razmaitė | Women's sprint | 11.971 | 13 | Did not advance | | | | | | |

Pursuit

| Athlete | Event | Qualification | | Quarterfinals | Semifinals | Final | |
| Athlete | Event | Time | Rank | Opposition Time | Opposition Time | Opposition Time | Rank |
|---|---|---|---|---|---|---|---|
| Artūras Kasputis | Men's individual pursuit | 4:33.748 | 10 | Did not advance | | | |
| Rasa Mažeikytė | Women's individual pursuit | 3:43.590 | 7 Q | Clignet (FRA); L 3:42.129 | Did not advance | | |
| Artūras Kasputis; Remigijus Lupeikis; Mindaugas Umaras; Arturas Trumpauskas | Men's team pursuit | 4:16.050 | 11 | Did not advance | | | |

Points

| Athlete | Event | Final | |
| Athlete | Event | Points | Rank |
|---|---|---|---|
| Remigijus Lupeikis | Men's points race | 4 | 13 |
| Rasa Mažeikytė | Women's points race | RET | |

== Gymnastics ==
=== Rhythmic gymnastics ===
| Athlete | Event | Qualification | | | | | | Final | | | | | |
| Athlete | Event | Hoop | Ball | Clubs | Ribbon | Total | Rank | Hoop | Ball | Clubs | Ribbon | Total | Rank |
|---|---|---|---|---|---|---|---|---|---|---|---|---|---|
| Kristina Kliukevičiūtė | Individual | 9.199 | 8.966 | 8.499 | 9.083 | 35.747 | 37 | Did not advance | | | | | |

== Judo ==
Men

| Athlete | Event | Preliminary | Round of 32 | Round of 16 | Quarterfinals | Semifinals | Repechage 1 | Repechage 2 | Repechage 3 | Repechage Final | Final / BM | |
| Athlete | Event | Opposition Result | Opposition Result | Opposition Result | Opposition Result | Opposition Result | Opposition Result | Opposition Result | Opposition Result | Opposition Result | Opposition Result | Rank |
|---|---|---|---|---|---|---|---|---|---|---|---|---|
| Algimantas Merkevičius | −86 kg | BYE | Wu Kuo-Hui (TPE); W 0001–0000 | Brian Olson (USA); W 1000–0000 | Armen Bagdasarov (UZB); L 0000–0100 | Did not advance | — | BYE | Oleg Maltsev (RUS); L 0000–0001 | did not advance | | |

== Modern pentathlon ==
One male pentathlete represented Lithuania in 1992.

| Athlete | Event | Shooting (10 m air pistol) | Fencing (épée one touch) | Swimming (200 m freestyle) | Riding (show jumping) | Running (3000 m) | Total points | Final rank |
| Athlete | Event | Points | Points | Points | Points | Points | Total points | Final rank |
|---|---|---|---|---|---|---|---|---|
| Andrejus Zadneprovskis | Men's | 1276 | 840 | 1070 | 892 | 1285 | 5363 | 13 |

== Rowing ==
Men

| Athlete | Event | Heats | | Repechage | | Semifinals C-D | | Semifinals | | Final | |
| Athlete | Event | Time | Rank | Time | Rank | Time | Rank | Time | Rank | Time | Rank |
|---|---|---|---|---|---|---|---|---|---|---|---|
| Juozas Bagdonas; Einius Petkus | Coxless pair | 6:45.92 | 5 R | 7:10.47 | 2 Q | — | | 6:57.75 | 5 FB | 6:38.12 | 10 |

Women

| Athlete | Event | Heats | | Repechage | | Semifinals C-D | | Semifinals | | Final | |
| Athlete | Event | Time | Rank | Time | Rank | Time | Rank | Time | Rank | Time | Rank |
|---|---|---|---|---|---|---|---|---|---|---|---|
| Birutė Šakickienė | Single sculls | 8:21.78 | 4 R | 8:41.08 | 4 FC | — | | | | 8:17.80 | 14 |

== Shooting ==
Women

| Athlete | Event | Qualification | | Final | |
| Athlete | Event | Score | Rank | Score | Rank |
|---|---|---|---|---|---|
| Daina Gudzinevičiūtė | Double trap | 101 | 10 | Did not advance | |

== Swimming ==
Men

| Athlete | Event | Heat | | Final B | | Final | |
| Athlete | Event | Time | Rank | Time | Rank | Time | Rank |
|---|---|---|---|---|---|---|---|
| Nerius Beiga | 100 m breaststroke | 1:04.45 | 28 | Did not advance | | | |
| Nerius Beiga | 200 m breaststroke | 2:23.40 | 31 | Did not advance | | | |
| Mindaugas Bružas | 100 m butterfly | 57.10 | 54 | Did not advance | | | |
| Mindaugas Bružas | 200 m butterfly | 2:03.76 | 32 | Did not advance | | | |
| Darius Grigalionis | 100 m backstroke | 56.20 | 12 q | 56.33 | 13 | Did not advance | |
| Raimundas Mažuolis | 50 m freestyle | 22.98 | 18 | Did not advance | | | |
| Raimundas Mažuolis | 100 m freestyle | 50.27 | 14 q | DNS | | Did not advance | |
| Arūnas Savickas | 200 m backstroke | 2:04.38 | 22 | Did not advance | | | |
| Mindaugas Špokas | 100 m backstroke | 57.20 | 29 | Did not advance | | | |
| Darius Grigalionis; Nerijus Beiga; Mindaugas Bružas; Raimundas Mažuolis | 4 × 100 m medley relay | 3:51.31 | 18 | Did not advance | | | |

Women

| Athlete | Event | Heat | | Final B | | Final | |
| Athlete | Event | Time | Rank | Time | Rank | Time | Rank |
|---|---|---|---|---|---|---|---|
| Laura Petrutytė | 50 m freestyle | 26.13 | 15 q | 26.36 | 16 | Did not advance | |
| Laura Petrutytė | 200 m freestyle | 2:09.78 | 41 | Did not advance | | | |
| Dita Želvienė | 50 m freestyle | 26.55 | 31 | Did not advance | | | |
| Dita Želvienė | 100 m freestyle | 58.57 | 38 | DNS | | Did not advance | |
| Dita Želvienė | 100 m butterfly | 1:04.63 | 39 | Did not advance | | | |

== Table Tennis ==
Singles

| Athlete | Event | Group round | | Round of 16 | Quarterfinals | Semifinals | Bronze medal | Final | |
| Athlete | Event | Opposition Result | Rank | Opposition Result | Opposition Result | Opposition Result | Opposition Result | Opposition Result | Rank |
|---|---|---|---|---|---|---|---|---|---|
| Rūta Garkauskaitė | Women's singles | Group N Otilia Bădescu (ROU); L 1 – 2 Bettine Vriesekoop (NED); W 2 – 1 Ambika Radhika (IND); W 2 – 0 | 2 | Did not advance | | | | | |

== Weightlifting ==
Men

| Athlete | Event | Snatch | | Clean & jerk | | Total | Rank |
| Athlete | Event | Result | Rank | Result | Rank | Total | Rank |
|---|---|---|---|---|---|---|---|
| Ramūnas Vyšniauskas | −91 kg | 140.0 | 23 | 175.0 | 23 | 315.0 | 23 |

== Wrestling ==
Men's Greco-Roman

| Athlete | Event | Elimination Pool | | | | | | | Final round | |
| Athlete | Event | Round 1 Result | Round 2 Result | Round 3 Result | Round 4 Result | Round 5 Result | Round 6 Result | Rank | Final round Result | Rank |
|---|---|---|---|---|---|---|---|---|---|---|
| Ruslanas Vartanovas | −52 kg | Nurym Dyusenov (KAZ); L 1-4 | Tiebiri Godswill (NGR); W 4-0 | Alfred Ter-Mkrtychyan (GER); L 0-8 | — | | | 14 | Did not advance | |
| Remigijus Šukevičius | −57 kg | Ruslan Khakymov (UKR); L 1-5 | Nabil Salhi (TUN); W 11-0 | Sarkis Elgkian (GRE); L 5-6 | — | | | 12 | Did not advance | |

Men's Freestyle

| Athlete | Event | Elimination Pool | | | | | | | Final round | |
| Athlete | Event | Round 1 Result | Round 2 Result | Round 3 Result | Round 4 Result | Round 5 Result | Round 6 Result | Rank | Final round Result | Rank |
|---|---|---|---|---|---|---|---|---|---|---|
| Ričardas Pauliukonis | −90 kg | Louis Purcell (ASA); W 11-0 | Melvin Douglas (USA); L 0-5 | Bashir Bhola Bhala (PAK); W 12-0 | Eldar Kurtanidze (GEO); L 1-5 | — | | 9 | Did not advance | |
