= Wrestling at the 1996 Summer Olympics – Men's Greco-Roman 57 kg =

Men's Greco-Roman 57 kg at the Games of the XXVI Olympiad
- Venue: Georgia World Congress Center
- Dates: 20–21 July 1996
- Competitors: 20 from 20 nations

Medalists
1st place, gold medalist(s)		Yuriy Melnichenko	Kazakhstan
2nd place, silver medalist(s)		Dennis Hall	United States
3rd place, bronze medalist(s)		Sheng Zetian	China

The men's Greco-Roman 57 kilograms at the 1996 Summer Olympics as part of the wrestling program were held at the Georgia World Congress Center from July 20 to July 21. The gold and silver medalists were determined by the final match of the main single-elimination bracket. The losers advanced to the repechage. These matches determined the bronze medalist for the event.

== Results ==
=== Round 1 ===
	Score		CP
1/16 finals
Nabil Salhi (TUN)	0–4	Aghasi Manukyan (ARM)	0–3 PO
Ruslan Khakymov (UKR)	5–1	Remigijus Šukevičius (LTU)	3–1 PP
Aleksandr Ignatenko (RUS)	0–11	Yuriy Melnichenko (KAZ)	0–4 ST
Marian Sandu (ROM)	3–2	Sarkis Elgkian (GRE)	3–1 PP
Armando Fernández (MEX)	0–12	Rıfat Yıldız (GER)	0–4 ST
Luis Sarmiento (CUB)	5–0	David Maia (POR)	3–0 PO
Kenkichi Nishimi (JPN)	6–17	Park Chi-ho (KOR)	1–4 SP
Şeref Eroğlu (TUR)	0–3	Dennis Hall (USA)	0–3 PO
Aigars Jansons (LAT)	4–3	Stanisław Pawłowski (POL)	3–1 PP
Vilayet Aghayev (AZE)	4–5	Sheng Zetian (CHN)	1–3 PP

=== Round 2 ===
	Score		CP
1/8 finals
Aghasi Manukyan (ARM)	0–11	Ruslan Khakymov (UKR)	0–4 ST
Yuriy Melnichenko (KAZ)	4–0	Marian Sandu (ROM)	3–0 PO
Rıfat Yıldız (GER)	4–1	Luis Sarmiento (CUB)	3–1 PP
Park Chi-ho (KOR)	2–3	Dennis Hall (USA)	1–3 PP
Aigars Jansons (LAT)	1–7	Sheng Zetian (CHN)	1–3 PP
Repechage
Nabil Salhi (TUN)	0–11	Remigijus Šukevičius (LTU)	0–4 ST
Aleksandr Ignatenko (RUS)	2–3	Sarkis Elgkian (GRE)	1–3 PP
Armando Fernández (MEX)	7–3	David Maia (POR)	3–1 PP
Kenkichi Nishimi (JPN)	8–7	Şeref Eroğlu (TUR)	3–1 PP
Stanisław Pawłowski (POL)	3–4	Vilayet Aghayev (AZE)	1–3 PP

=== Round 3 ===
	Score		CP
Quarterfinals
Ruslan Khakymov (UKR)	1–8	Yuriy Melnichenko (KAZ)	1–3 PP
Rıfat Yıldız (GER)		Bye	
Dennis Hall (USA)		Bye	
Sheng Zetian (CHN)		Bye	
Repechage
Remigijus Šukevičius (LTU)	5–6	Sarkis Elgkian (GRE)	1–3 PP
Armando Fernández (MEX)	0–12	Kenkichi Nishimi (JPN)	0–4 ST
Vilayet Aghayev (AZE)	7–2	Aghasi Manukyan (ARM)	3–1 PP
Marian Sandu (ROM)	0–7	Luis Sarmiento (CUB)	0–3 PO
Park Chi-ho (KOR)	2–9	Aigars Jansons (LAT)	1–3 PP

=== Round 4 ===
	Score		CP
Semifinals
Yuriy Melnichenko (KAZ)	3–0	Rıfat Yıldız (GER)	3–0 PO
Dennis Hall (USA)	1–0	Sheng Zetian (CHN)	3–0 PO
Repechage
Sarkis Elgkian (GRE)	4–2	Kenkichi Nishimi (JPN)	3–1 PP
Vilayet Aghayev (AZE)	0–1	Luis Sarmiento (CUB)	0–3 PO
Aigars Jansons (LAT)	4–9	Ruslan Khakymov (UKR)	1–3 PP

=== Round 5 ===
	Score		CP
Repechage
Sarkis Elgkian (GRE)	2–4	Luis Sarmiento (CUB)	1–3 PP
Ruslan Khakymov (UKR)		Bye	

=== Round 6 ===
	Score		CP
Repechage
Rıfat Yıldız (GER)	2–3	Ruslan Khakymov (UKR)	1–3 PP
Luis Sarmiento (CUB)	2–8	Sheng Zetian (CHN)	1–3 PP

=== Finals ===
	Score		CP
Classification 7th–8th
Sarkis Elgkian (GRE)	5–4	Kenkichi Nishimi (JPN)	3–1 PP
Classification 5th–6th
Rıfat Yıldız (GER)	0–0 Ret	Luis Sarmiento (CUB)	4–0 PA
Bronze medal match
Ruslan Khakymov (UKR)	0–4	Sheng Zetian (CHN)	0–3 PO
Gold medal match
Yuriy Melnichenko (KAZ)	4–1	Dennis Hall (USA)	3–1 PP

== Final standing ==
Rank	Athlete
1st place, gold medalist(s)	Yuriy Melnichenko (KAZ)
2nd place, silver medalist(s)	Dennis Hall (USA)
3rd place, bronze medalist(s)	Sheng Zetian (CHN)
4	Ruslan Khakymov (UKR)
5	Rıfat Yıldız (GER)
6	Luis Sarmiento (CUB)
7	Sarkis Elgkian (GRE)
8	Kenkichi Nishimi (JPN)
9	Aigars Jansons (LAT)
10	Vilayet Aghayev (AZE)
11	Park Chi-ho (KOR)
12	Remigijus Šukevičius (LTU)
13	Aghasi Manukyan (ARM)
14	Armando Fernández (MEX)
15	Marian Sandu (ROM)
16	Stanisław Pawłowski (POL)
17	Şeref Eroğlu (TUR)
18	David Maia (POR)
19	Aleksandr Ignatenko (RUS)
20	Nabil Salhi (TUN)
