= Wrestling at the 1998 Asian Games – Men's Greco-Roman 58 kg =

Men's Greco-Roman 58 kg at the 1998 Asian Games
- Venue: Thammasat Gymnasium 1
- Dates: 13–14 December 1998
- Competitors: 10 from 10 nations

Medalists
gold medal	Kim In-sub	South Korea
silver medal	Asliddin Khudoyberdiev	Uzbekistan
bronze medal	Sheng Zetian	China

The men's Greco-Roman 58 kilograms wrestling competition at the 1998 Asian Games in Bangkok was held on 13 December and 14 December at the Thammasat Gymnasium 1.

The gold and silver medalists were determined by the final match of the main single-elimination bracket. The losers advanced to the repechage. These matches determined the bronze medalist for the event.

== Schedule ==
All times are Indochina Time (UTC+07:00)

Date	Time	Event
Sunday, 13 December 1998	09:00	Round 1
Sunday, 13 December 1998	16:00	Round 2
Monday, 14 December 1998	09:00	Round 3
Monday, 14 December 1998	09:00	Round 4
Monday, 14 December 1998	16:00	Finals

== Results ==
=== Round 1 ===
	Score		CP
1/8 finals
Kenkichi Nishimi (JPN)	0–10	Sheng Zetian (CHN)	0–4 ST
Asliddin Khudoyberdiev (UZB)	10–0 Fall	Nguyễn Thành Khôi (VIE)	4–0 TO
Sardar Pashaei (IRI)	12–0	Melchor Tumasis (PHI)	4–0 ST
Nurjan Jusupov (KGZ)	1–3	Serik Zhumashev (KAZ)	1–3 PP
Suthut Noochai (THA)	0–10	Kim In-sub (KOR)	0–4 ST

=== Round 2 ===
	Score		CP
Quarterfinals
Sheng Zetian (CHN)	0–3	Asliddin Khudoyberdiev (UZB)	0–3 PO
Sardar Pashaei (IRI)		Bye	
Serik Zhumashev (KAZ)		Bye	
Kim In-sub (KOR)		Bye	
Repechage
Kenkichi Nishimi (JPN)	12–0 Fall	Nguyễn Thành Khôi (VIE)	4–0 TO
Melchor Tumasis (PHI)	0–4 Fall	Nurjan Jusupov (KGZ)	0–4 TO
Suthut Noochai (THA)		Bye	

=== Round 3 ===
	Score		CP
Semifinals
Asliddin Khudoyberdiev (UZB)	8–5	Sardar Pashaei (IRI)	3–1 PP
Serik Zhumashev (KAZ)	0–6	Kim In-sub (KOR)	0–3 PO
Repechage
Suthut Noochai (THA)	2–12 Fall	Kenkichi Nishimi (JPN)	0–4 TO
Nurjan Jusupov (KGZ)	0–4	Sheng Zetian (CHN)	0–3 PO

=== Round 4 ===
	Score		CP
Repechage
Sardar Pashaei (IRI)	3–2	Kenkichi Nishimi (JPN)	3–1 PP
Sheng Zetian (CHN)	3–2	Serik Zhumashev (KAZ)	3–1 PP

=== Finals ===
	Score		CP
Bronze medal match
Sardar Pashaei (IRI)	0–3	Sheng Zetian (CHN)	0–3 PO
Gold medal match
Asliddin Khudoyberdiev (UZB)	0–2	Kim In-sub (KOR)	0–3 PO

== Final standing ==
Rank	Athlete
1st place, gold medalist(s)	Kim In-sub (KOR)
2nd place, silver medalist(s)	Asliddin Khudoyberdiev (UZB)
3rd place, bronze medalist(s)	Sheng Zetian (CHN)
4	Sardar Pashaei (IRI)
5	Kenkichi Nishimi (JPN)
6	Serik Zhumashev (KAZ)
7	Nurjan Jusupov (KGZ)
8	Suthut Noochai (THA)
9	Melchor Tumasis (PHI)
9	Nguyễn Thành Khôi (VIE)
