= Wrestling at the 1992 Summer Olympics – Men's Greco-Roman 57 kg =

Men's Greco-Roman 57 kg at the Games of the XXV Olympiad
- Venue: Institut Nacional d'Educació Física de Catalunya
- Dates: 28–30 July 1992
- Competitors: 19 from 19 nations

Medalists
| 1st place, gold medalist(s) | | An Han-bong | South Korea |
| 2nd place, silver medalist(s) | | Rıfat Yıldız | Germany |
| 3rd place, bronze medalist(s) | | Sheng Zetian | China |

The men's Greco-Roman 57 kilograms at the 1992 Summer Olympics as part of the wrestling program were held at the Institut Nacional d'Educació Física de Catalunya from July 28 to July 30. The wrestlers were divided into 2 groups. The winner of each group was decided by a double-elimination system.

== Results ==
Legend

- WO — Won by walkover

=== Elimination A ===
==== Round 1 ====
| | Score | | CP |
|---|---|---|---|
| Dennis Hall (USA) | 0–3 | Patrice Mourier (FRA) | 0–3 PO |
| Remigijus Šukevičius (LTU) | 2–4 | Nikolay Dimitrov (BUL) | 1–3 PP |
| Isaak Theodoridis (GRE) | 2–3 | András Sike (HUN) | 1–3 PP |
| William Lara (CUB) | 1–3 | Rıfat Yıldız (GER) | 1–3 PP |
| Daisuke Hanahara (JPN) | 0–3 | Aleksandr Ignatenko (EUN) | 0–3 PO |

==== Round 2 ====
| | Score | | CP |
|---|---|---|---|
| Dennis Hall (USA) | 4–3 | Remigijus Šukevičius (LTU) | 3–1 PP |
| Patrice Mourier (FRA) | 4–1 | Nikolay Dimitrov (BUL) | 3–1 PP |
| Isaak Theodoridis (GRE) | 0–5 | William Lara (CUB) | 0–3 PO |
| András Sike (HUN) | 8–1 | Daisuke Hanahara (JPN) | 3–1 PP |
| Rıfat Yıldız (GER) | 6–5 | Aleksandr Ignatenko (EUN) | 3–1 PP |

==== Round 3 ====
| | Score | | CP |
|---|---|---|---|
| Dennis Hall (USA) | 8–2 Fall | Nikolay Dimitrov (BUL) | 4–0 TO |
| Patrice Mourier (FRA) | 1–2 | William Lara (CUB) | 1–3 PP |
| András Sike (HUN) | 0–3 Fall | Rıfat Yıldız (GER) | 0–4 TO |
| Aleksandr Ignatenko (EUN) | | Bye | |

==== Round 4 ====
| | Score | | CP |
|---|---|---|---|
| Aleksandr Ignatenko (EUN) | 6–1 | Dennis Hall (USA) | 3–1 PP |
| Patrice Mourier (FRA) | 0–6 | Rıfat Yıldız (GER) | 0–3 PO |
| András Sike (HUN) | 0–1 | William Lara (CUB) | 0–3 PO |

==== Round 5 ====
| | Score | | CP |
|---|---|---|---|
| Aleksandr Ignatenko (EUN) | 2–1 | William Lara (CUB) | 3–1 PP |
| Rıfat Yıldız (GER) | | Bye | |

==== Summary ====
| Pos | Athlete | Pld | W | L | R | CP | TP |
|---|---|---|---|---|---|---|---|
| 1 | Rıfat Yıldız (GER) | 4 | 4 | 0 | X (Note: Classification points: GER 6, EUN 4, CUB 2) | 13 | 18 |
| 2 | Aleksandr Ignatenko (EUN) | 4 | 3 | 1 | X | 10 | 16 |
| 3 | William Lara (CUB) | 5 | 3 | 2 | X | 11 | 10 |
| 4 | Dennis Hall (USA) | 4 | 2 | 2 | 4 | 8 | 13 |
| — | Patrice Mourier (FRA) | 4 | 2 | 2 | 4 | 7 | 8 |
| 5 | András Sike (HUN) | 4 | 2 | 2 | 4 | 6 | 11 |
| — | Nikolay Dimitrov (BUL) | 3 | 1 | 2 | 3 | 4 | 7 |
| — | Remigijus Šukevičius (LTU) | 2 | 0 | 2 | 2 | 2 | 5 |
| — | Isaak Theodoridis (GRE) | 2 | 0 | 2 | 2 | 1 | 2 |
| — | Daisuke Hanahara (JPN) | 2 | 0 | 2 | 2 | 1 | 1 |

Source: Official Report

=== Elimination B ===
==== Round 1 ====
| | Score | | CP |
|---|---|---|---|
| Ergüder Bekişdamat (TUR) | 1–11 | An Han-bong (KOR) | 1–3 PP |
| Zoran Galović (IOP) | 4–5 | Marian Sandu (ROM) | 1–3 PP |
| Miguel Ángel Sierra (ESP) | 0–2 | Sheng Zetian (CHN) | 0–3 PO |
| Keijo Pehkonen (FIN) | 4–0 | Abderrahman Naanaa (MAR) | 3–0 PO |
| Armando Fernández (MEX) | | Bye | |

==== Round 2 ====
| | Score | | CP |
|---|---|---|---|
| Armando Fernández (MEX) | 0–7 | Ergüder Bekişdamat (TUR) | 0–3 PO |
| An Han-bong (KOR) | 6–0 | Zoran Galović (IOP) | 3–0 PO |
| Marian Sandu (ROM) | 6–0 | Miguel Ángel Sierra (ESP) | 3–0 PO |
| Sheng Zetian (CHN) | 5–4 | Keijo Pehkonen (FIN) | 3–1 PP |
| Abderrahman Naanaa (MAR) | | Bye | |

==== Round 3 ====
| | Score | | CP |
|---|---|---|---|
| Abderrahman Naanaa (MAR) | 4–1 | Armando Fernández (MEX) | 3–1 PP |
| Ergüder Bekişdamat (TUR) | 1–3 | Marian Sandu (ROM) | 1–3 PP |
| An Han-bong (KOR) | 8–0 | Sheng Zetian (CHN) | 3–0 PO |
| Keijo Pehkonen (FIN) | | Bye | |

==== Round 4 ====
| | Score | | CP |
|---|---|---|---|
| Keijo Pehkonen (FIN) | 0–8 | An Han-bong (KOR) | 0–3 PO |
| Abderrahman Naanaa (MAR) | 0–9 | Marian Sandu (ROM) | 0–3 PO |
| Sheng Zetian (CHN) | | Bye | |

==== Round 5 ====
| | Score | | CP |
|---|---|---|---|
| Sheng Zetian (CHN) | 7–5 | Marian Sandu (ROM) | 3–1 PP |
| An Han-bong (KOR) | | Bye | |

==== Round 6 ====
| | Score | | CP |
|---|---|---|---|
| An Han-bong (KOR) | 8–0 | Marian Sandu (ROM) | 3–0 PO |
| Sheng Zetian (CHN) | | Bye | |

==== Summary ====
| Pos | Athlete | Pld | W | L | R | CP | TP |
|---|---|---|---|---|---|---|---|
| 1 | An Han-bong (KOR) | 5 | 5 | 0 | X (Note: Classification points: KOR 6, CHN 3, ROM 1) | 15 | 41 |
| 2 | Sheng Zetian (CHN) | 4 | 3 | 1 | X | 9 | 14 |
| 3 | Marian Sandu (ROM) | 6 | 4 | 2 | X | 13 | 28 |
| 4 | Keijo Pehkonen (FIN) | 3 | 1 | 2 | 4 | 4 | 8 |
| 5 | Abderrahman Naanaa (MAR) | 3 | 1 | 2 | 4 | 3 | 4 |
| — | Ergüder Bekişdamat (TUR) | 3 | 1 | 2 | 3 | 5 | 9 |
| — | Armando Fernández (MEX) | 2 | 0 | 2 | 3 | 1 | 1 |
| — | Zoran Galović (IOP) | 2 | 0 | 2 | 2 | 1 | 4 |
| — | Miguel Ángel Sierra (ESP) | 2 | 0 | 2 | 2 | 0 | 0 |

Source: Official Report

=== Finals ===
| | Score | | CP |
9th place match
| András Sike (HUN) | WO | Abderrahman Naanaa (MAR) | |
7th place match
| Dennis Hall (USA) | 4–6 | Keijo Pehkonen (FIN) | 1–3 PP |
5th place match
| William Lara (CUB) | 8–1 | Marian Sandu (ROM) | 3–1 PP |
Bronze medal match
| Aleksandr Ignatenko (EUN) | 4–5 | Sheng Zetian (CHN) | 1–3 PP |
Gold medal match
| Rıfat Yıldız (GER) | 5–6 | An Han-bong (KOR) | 1–3 PP |

== Final standing ==
| Rank | Athlete |
|---|---|
| 1st place, gold medalist(s) | An Han-bong (KOR) |
| 2nd place, silver medalist(s) | Rıfat Yıldız (GER) |
| 3rd place, bronze medalist(s) | Sheng Zetian (CHN) |
| 4 | Aleksandr Ignatenko (EUN) |
| 5 | William Lara (CUB) |
| 6 | Marian Sandu (ROM) |
| 7 | Keijo Pehkonen (FIN) |
| 8 | Dennis Hall (USA) |
| 9 | Abderrahman Naanaa (MAR) |
| 10 | András Sike (HUN) |
