= List of Armenian wrestlers =

This is an incomplete list of Armenian wrestlers, from 1952 to the present.

- Ara Abrahamian
- Artur Aleksanyan
- Roman Amoyan
- Arsen Julfalakyan
- Arsen Harutyunyan
- Mihran Harutyunyan
- Georgy Ketoev
- Artiom Kiouregkian
- Aghasi Manukyan
- Maksim Manukyan
- Mkkhitar Manukyan
- Armen Mkrchyan
- Karen Mnatsakanyan
- Armen Nazaryan
- Yury Patrikeyev
- Vazgen Tevanyan
- Slavik Galstyan
- Vaghinak Galstyan
- Arayik Gevorgyan
- Seth Rollins
- David Safaryan
