= Armando Fernández =

Armando Fernández may refer to:

- Armando Fernández (water polo) (born 1955), Mexican, and later German, former water polo player
- Armando Fernández (wrestler) (born 1969), Mexican former sport wrestler
