= Miguel Sierra =

Miguel Sierra may refer to:

- Miguel Ángel Sierra (wrestler) (born 1971), Spanish wrestler
- Miguel Sierra (footballer) (born 2004), Spanish footballer
- Miguel Sierra Zúñiga (fl. 2003-2006), Mexican politician

== See also ==
- San Miguel de la Sierra, municipality in Ayutla, Jalisco, Mexico
