= Paulo Caicedo =

Ecuadorian cyclist

Personal information
- Born: 6 October 1969 (age 57)

Cycling career
- Sport: Cycling

Paulo Caicedo (born 6 October 1969) is an Ecuadorian former cyclist. He competed in the men's individual road race at the 1996 Summer Olympics.
