= Yevgeny Golovanov =

Belarusian cyclist

Personal information
- Born: 6 February 1972 (age 54) Minsk, Belarus

Cycling career
- Sport: Cycling

Yevgeny Golovanov (born 6 February 1972) is a Belarusian cyclist. He competed in the men's individual road race at the 1996 Summer Olympics.
