= Adan Juárez =

Mexican cyclist

Personal information
- Full name: Adan Juárez Serrano
- Born: 18 December 1969 (age 55)

Adan Juárez Serrano (Note: In this Spanish name, the first or paternal surname is Juárez and the second or maternal family name is Serrano.) (born 18 December 1969) is a Mexican cyclist. He competed in the men's individual road race at the 1996 Summer Olympics.
