= Vyacheslav German =

Belarusian cyclist

Personal information
- Born: 17 July 1972 (age 54)

Cycling career
- Sport: Cycling

Vyacheslav German (born 17 July 1972) is a Belarusian cyclist. He competed in the men's individual road race at the 1996 Summer Olympics.
