= An Han-bong =

South Korean wrestler (born 1968)

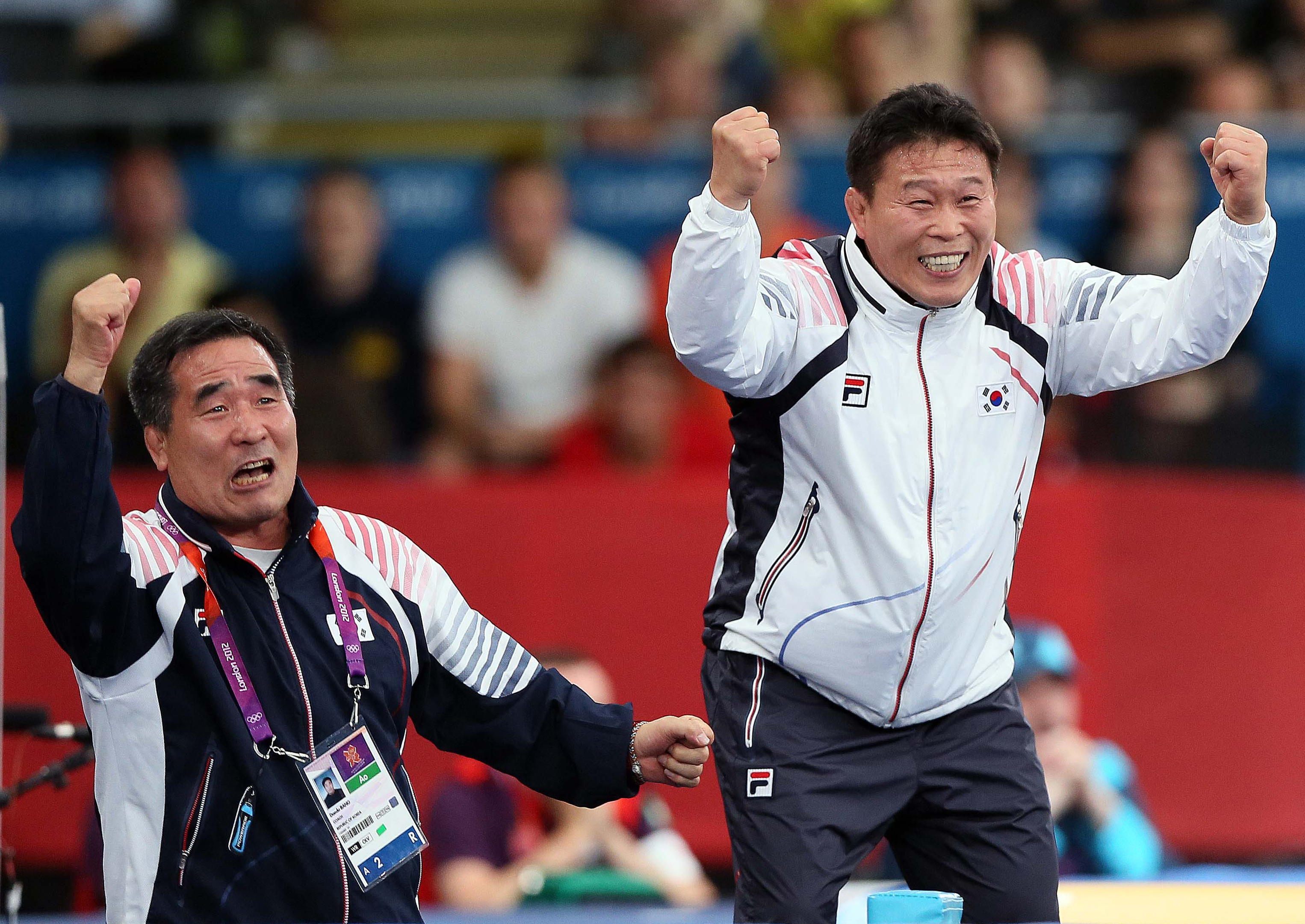
- As coach in the 2012 London Olympic Games

Personal information
- Native name: 안한봉
- National team: South Korea
- Born: October 15, 1968 (age 57)
Medal record
Men's Greco-Roman wrestling
Representing South Korea
Olympic Games
Gold medal – first place	1992 Barcelona	57 kg
World Championships
Silver medal – second place	1990 Ostia	52 kg
Bronze medal – third place	1989 Martigny	52 kg
Asian Games
Gold medal – first place	1990 Beijing	52 kg

Korean name
- Hangul: 안한봉
- Hanja: 安漢奉
- RR: An Hanbong
- MR: An Hanbong

An Han-bong (Korean: 안한봉; Hanja: 安漢奉; born October 15, 1968, in Haenam, South Jeolla Province) is a retired South Korean Greco-Roman wrestler who has later become a coach.

He won the gold medal in the 57 kg category at the 1992 Summer Olympics in Barcelona.

An became South Korea's national wrestling team coach ahead of the 2012 London Olympics.
