= Mohamed Barguaoui =

Tunisian wrestler (born 1975)

Personal information
- Nationality: Tunisian
- Born: 5 January 1975 (age 51)

Sport
- Sport: Wrestling

Mohamed Barguaoui (born 5 January 1975) is a Tunisian wrestler. He competed in the men's Greco-Roman 58 kg at the 2000 Summer Olympics.
