= Ali Sayed Darwish =

Emirati cyclist (1977–2001)

Personal information
- Born: 10 April 1977
- Died: 2 January 2001 (aged 23) Dubai, United Arab Emirates

Cycling career
- Sport: Cycling

Ali Sayed Darwish (10 April 1977 – 2 January 2001) was an Emirati cyclist. He competed in the men's individual road race at the 1996 Summer Olympics.

He won the bronze medal in the road race at the 1995 Asian Junior Championships. Between 1994 and 1998, Darwish won several national titles and won gold and silver medals at the Gulf Cycling Championships (GCC). He won the silver medal at the 1999 Pan Arab Games in Amman. He competed at among others the Tour of Tunisia and Asian Cycling Championships. In 1998 he had a serious accident during the Tour of Egypt and had to recover for six months. He was killed in a car accident while riding in Dubai.
