= Jamil Suaiden =

Brazilian cyclist

Personal information
- Born: 21 November 1972 (age 53) Brasília, Brazil

Cycling career
- Sport: Cycling
Medal record
Representing Brazil
Pan American Games
Bronze medal – third place	1995 Mar del Plata	Team pursuit

Jamil Elias Suaiden (born 21 November 1972) is a Brazilian cyclist. He competed in the men's individual road race at the 1996 Summer Olympics.
