= Nikolay Dimitrov (wrestler) =

Bulgarian wrestler

Nikola Zhelyazkov Dimitrov
Personal information
- Nationality: Bulgarian
- Born: 30 October 1968 (age 57)

Sport
- Sport: Wrestling

Nikola Zhelyazkov Dimitrov (born 30 October 1968) is a Bulgarian wrestler. He competed in the men's Greco-Roman 57 kg at the 1992 Summer Olympics.
