= Blayne Wikner =

South African cyclist

Personal information
- Born: 15 February 1972 (age 54) East London, South Africa

Cycling career
- Sport: Cycling

Blayne Wikner (born 15 February 1972) is a South African cyclist. He competed in the men's individual road race at the 1996 Summer Olympics.
