= Brett Cash =

Australian wrestler

Personal information
- Nationality: Australian
- Born: 28 May 1979 (age 47) Sydney, Australia

Sport
- Sport: Wrestling

Brett Cash (born 28 of May 1979) is an Australian wrestler. He competed in the men's Greco-Roman 58 kg at the 2000 Summer Olympics.
