= Isaak Theodoridis =

Greek wrestler

Personal information
- Nationality: Greek
- Born: 21 February 1968 (age 58) Stuttgart, Germany

Sport
- Sport: Wrestling

Isaak Theodoridis (born 21 February 1968) is a Greek wrestler. He competed in the men's Greco-Roman 57 kg at the 1992 Summer Olympics.
