= Yousef Shadi =

Libyan cyclist (born 1969)

Personal information
- Born: 16 December 1969 (age 56)

Cycling career
- Sport: Cycling

Yousef Shadi (born 16 December 1969) is a Libyan cyclist. He competed in the men's individual road race at the 1996 Summer Olympics.
