= Gregory Randolph =

American cyclist

Personal information
- Born: December 12, 1972 (age 53) Denver, Colorado, United States

Cycling career
- Sport: Cycling
- Discipline: Road
- Role: Rider

Professional teams
- 1996: Motorola
- 1997: Die Continentale-Olympia

Gregory Randolph (born December 12, 1972) is an American former cyclist. He competed in the men's individual road race at the 1996 Summer Olympics.

== Major results ==
1996
1st Stage 5 Tour de Bretagne
5th Philadelphia International Cycling Classic
