= Daisuke Hanahara =

Japanese wrestler (born 1969)

Personal information
- Nationality: Japanese
- Born: 11 December 1969 (age 56) Tokyo, Japan

Sport
- Sport: Wrestling

Daisuke Hanahara (born 11 December 1969) is a Japanese wrestler. He competed in the men's Greco-Roman 57 kg at the 1992 Summer Olympics.
