= Youssef Khanfar Al-Shakali =

Omani cyclist

Personal information
- Born: 1 January 1972 (age 54)

Cycling career
- Sport: Cycling

Youssef Khanfar Al-Shakali (born 1 January 1972) is an Omani cyclist. He competed in the men's individual road race at the 1996 Summer Olympics.
