= Pavel Zaduban =

Slovak cyclist

Personal information
- Born: 1 October 1968 (age 58) Považská Bystrica, Czechoslovakia

Cycling career
- Sport: Cycling

Pavel Zaduban (born 1 October 1968) is a Slovak cyclist. He competed in the men's individual road race at the 1996 Summer Olympics.
