= Cycling at the 1996 Summer Olympics – Men's individual road race =

Men's road race at the Games of the XXVI Olympiad
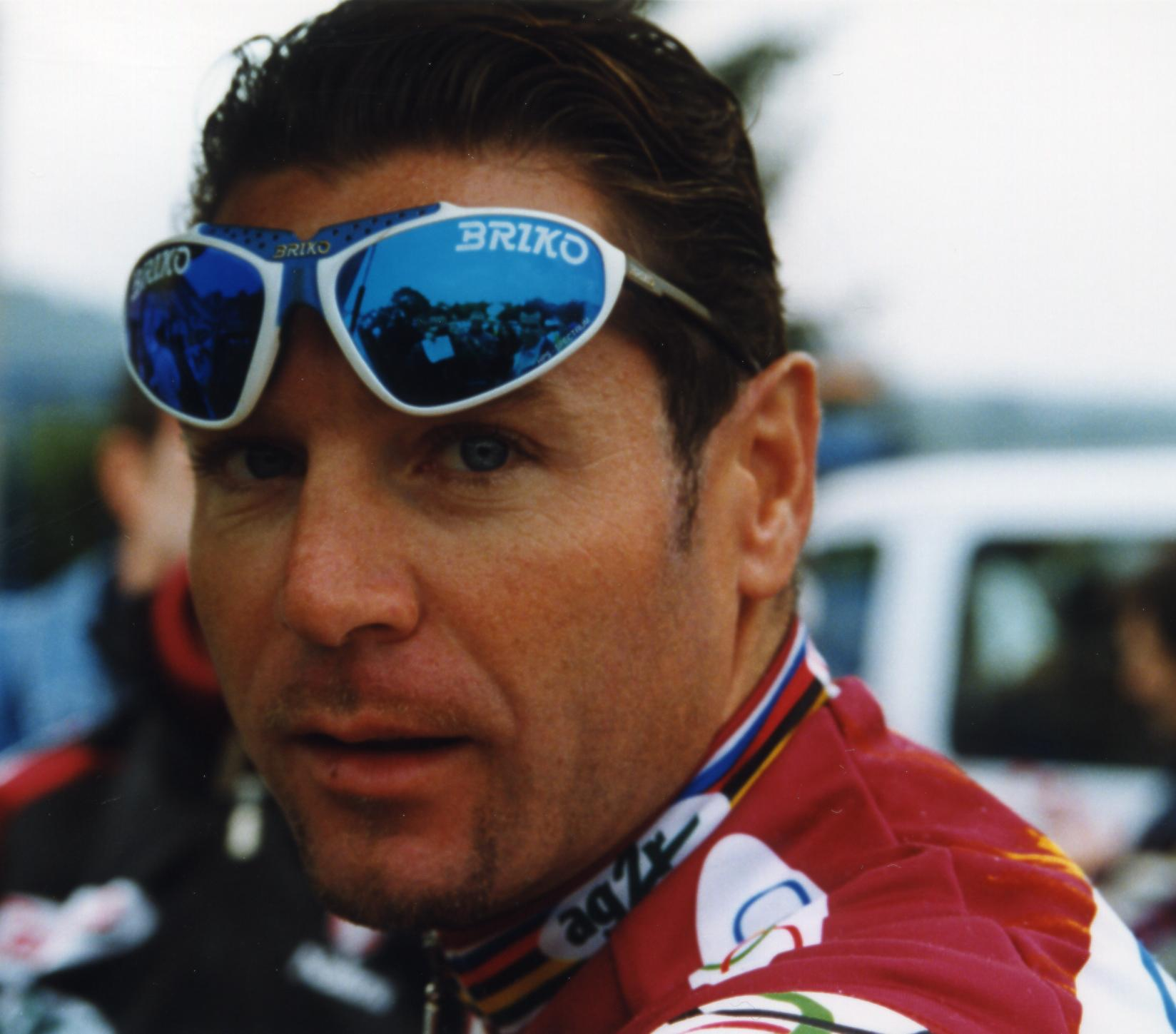
- Pascal Richard (1998)
- Venue: Atlanta
- Date: July 31
- Competitors: 183 from 57 nations
- Winning time: 4:53:56

Medalists
1st place, gold medalist(s)		Pascal Richard; Switzerland
2nd place, silver medalist(s)		Rolf Sørensen; Denmark
3rd place, bronze medalist(s)		Max Sciandri; Great Britain

The men's individual road race at the 1996 Summer Olympics in Atlanta, was held on July 31, 1996. There were 183 participants from 57 nations in the race over 221.85 km, with 116 cyclists finishing. For the first time, the event was open to professionals. Previously, it was restricted to "amateurs" which included state-funded Eastern Bloc athletes. The maximum number of cyclists per nation was five, up from three in previous editions of the event. The event was won by Pascal Richard of Switzerland, the nation's first victory in the men's individual road race and first medal in the event since a bronze in 1936. Rolf Sørensen earned Denmark's third medal in the event, silver just as in 1964 and 1968. Max Sciandri similarly matched Great Britain's best result: a bronze, as in 1896 and 1956.

== Background ==
This was the 15th appearance of the event, previously held in 1896 and then at every Summer Olympics since 1936. It replaced the individual time trial event that had been held from 1912 to 1932; with the re-introduction of the time trial in Atlanta, this was the first time that both events were held at the same Games. The 1996 Games were also the first to allow top professional riders to compete; this also resulted in lengthening the distance of the course and increasing the number of riders per nation (to increase teamwork opportunity). There was no clear favorite in the race. Miguel Induráin of Spain was the most prominent cyclist competing, but his skills were far more suited to the time trial—in which he would take gold three days later.

Albania, Armenia, Belarus, the Czech Republic, Kazakhstan, Moldova, Oman, Russia, Slovakia, Ukraine, and Uzbekistan each made their debut in the men's individual road race. Great Britain made its 15th appearance in the event, the only nation to have competed in each appearance to date.

== Competition format and course ==
The mass-start race was on a 221.85 kilometre course over the Buckhead Cycling Course in Atlanta. The distance had been increased from previous Olympic road races to be more consistent with professional races.

== Schedule ==
All times are Eastern Daylight Time (UTC−4)

Date	Time	Round
Wednesday, 31 July 1996	8:30	Final

== Results ==
A three-man breakout occurred with 33 kilometres to go, with Richard, Sørensen, and Sciandri getting clear of the peloton. The final sprint went to Richard. A second group of three formed as well, this time with the home-nation cyclist Andreu winning the sprint for fourth place.

Rank	Cyclist	Nation	Time
1st place, gold medalist(s)	Pascal Richard	Switzerland	4:53:56
2nd place, silver medalist(s)	Rolf Sørensen	Denmark	s.t.
3rd place, bronze medalist(s)	Max Sciandri	Great Britain	+ 2"
4	Frankie Andreu	United States	+ 1' 14"
5	Richard Virenque	France	s.t.
6	Melcior Mauri	Spain	+ 1' 15"
7	Fabio Baldato	Italy	+ 1' 28"
8	Michele Bartoli	Italy	s.t.
9	Zbigniew Spruch	Poland	s.t.
10	Johan Museeuw	Belgium	s.t.
11	Jesper Skibby	Denmark	s.t.
12	Lance Armstrong	United States	s.t.
13	Dimitri Konyshev	Russia	+ 2' 29"
14	Serguei Outschakov	Ukraine	s.t.
15	Wilfried Peeters	Belgium	+ 2' 32"
16	Olaf Ludwig	Germany	+ 2' 36"
17	Laurent Brochard	France	+ 2' 37"
18	Arvis Piziks	Latvia	s.t.
19	Neil Stephens	Australia	+ 2' 38"
20	Erik Zabel	Germany	+ 2' 47"
21	Laurent Jalabert	France	s.t.
22	Kaspars Ozers	Latvia	s.t.
23	Robbie McEwen	Australia	+ 2' 48"
24	Jaan Kirsipuu	Estonia	s.t.
25	Frank Vandenbroucke	Belgium	s.t.
26	Miguel Induráin	Spain	s.t.
27	Vassili Davidenko	Russia	s.t.
28	Rolf Aldag	Germany	s.t.
29	Andrey Kivilev	Kazakhstan	s.t.
30	Ján Svorada	Czech Republic	s.t.
31	Juris Silovs	Latvia	s.t.
32	Francesco Casagrande	Italy	s.t.
33	Andrei Tchmil	Ukraine	s.t.
34	Michel Lafis	Sweden	s.t.
35	Glenn Magnusson	Sweden	+ 2' 49"
36	Lauri Aus	Estonia	s.t.
37	Maurizio Fondriest	Italy	s.t.
38	Erik Dekker	Netherlands	s.t.
39	Orlando Rodrigues	Portugal	s.t.
40	Brian Holm	Denmark	s.t.
41	Steve Bauer	Canada	s.t.
42	Lars Michaelsen	Denmark	s.t.
43	Oleh Pankov	Ukraine	s.t.
44	Werner Riebenbauer	Austria	s.t.
45	Erik Breukink	Netherlands	s.t.
46	Harald Morscher	Austria	s.t.
47	Ruber Marín	Colombia	s.t.
48	Pedro Lópes	Portugal	s.t.
49	Andres Lauk	Estonia	+ 2' 50"
50	Slawomir Chrzanowski	Poland	s.t.
51	Pavel Tonkov	Russia	s.t.
52	Beat Zberg	Switzerland	s.t.
53	Alexander Vinokourov	Kazakhstan	s.t.
54	Peter Wrolich	Austria	s.t.
55	Markus Andersson	Sweden	s.t.
56	Aart Vierhouten	Netherlands	s.t.
57	Joona Laukka	Finland	s.t.
58	Pyotr Ugryumov	Russia	s.t.
59	Milan Dvorščík	Slovakia	s.t.
60	Johan Bruyneel	Belgium	+ 2' 51"
61	Douglas Ryder	South Africa	s.t.
62	Georg Totschnig	Austria	s.t.
63	Kari Myyryläinen	Finland	s.t.
64	Michael Barry	Canada	s.t.
65	Damian McDonald	Australia	s.t.
66	Ric Reid	New Zealand	s.t.
67	Abraham Olano	Spain	+ 2' 52"
68	Ján Valach	Slovakia	s.t.
69	Pavel Kavetsky	Belarus	s.t.
70	Robert Pintarič	Slovenia	s.t.
71	Eduardo Graciano	Mexico	+ 2' 53"
72	David McCann	Ireland	s.t.
73	Veaceslav Oriol	Moldova	s.t.
74	Gregory Randolph	United States	s.t.
75	Gord Fraser	Canada	s.t.
76	George Hincapie	United States	s.t.
77	Manuel Fernández	Spain	s.t.
78	Nuno Marta	Portugal	s.t.
79	Malcolm Elliott	Great Britain	s.t.
80	Eric Wohlberg	Canada	+ 2' 54"
81	Peter Luttenberger	Austria	s.t.
82	Mario Cipollini	Italy	s.t.
83	Didier Rous	France	s.t.
84	Javier de Jesús Zapata	Colombia	s.t.
85	Aleksandr Shefer	Kazakhstan	s.t.
86	Óscar Giraldo	Colombia	s.t.
87	Bjarne Riis	Denmark	+ 2' 55"
88	Jacques Landry	Canada	s.t.
89	Andrey Teteryuk	Kazakhstan	s.t.
90	Eduardo Uribe	Mexico	s.t.
91	Mauro Ribeiro	Brazil	s.t.
92	Dainis Ozols	Latvia	s.t.
93	Steve Hegg	United States	s.t.
94	Tomasz Brożyna	Poland	+ 2' 56"
95	Remigijus Lupeikis	Lithuania	s.t.
96	Raido Kodanipork	Estonia	s.t.
97	Blayne Wikner	South Africa	s.t.
98	Stephen Hodge	Australia	+ 2' 57"
99	John Tanner	Great Britain	s.t.
100	Djamolidine Abdoujaparov	Uzbekistan	s.t.
101	Marino Alonso	Spain	s.t.
102	Patrick Jonker	Australia	s.t.
103	Yevgeny Berzin	Russia	s.t.
104	Alex Zülle	Switzerland	+ 2' 58"
105	Rolf Järmann	Switzerland	s.t.
106	Romāns Vainšteins	Latvia	s.t.
107	Frédéric Moncassin	France	+ 2' 59"
108	Tristan Hoffman	Netherlands	s.t.
109	Tom Steels	Belgium	+ 3' 00"
110	Thomas Frischknecht	Switzerland	+ 4' 08"
111	Danny Nelissen	Netherlands	+ 4' 12"
112	Cândido Barbosa	Portugal	+ 7' 33"
113	Yevgeny Golovanov	Belarus	+ 11' 42"
114	Pavel Zaduban	Slovakia	s.t.
115	Hussein Monsalve	Venezuela	s.t.
116	Irving Aguilar	Mexico	+ 11' 43"
—	Besnik Musaj	Albania	DNF
—	Gustavo Artacho	Argentina	DNF
—	Rubén Pegorín	Argentina	DNF
—	Arsen Ghazaryan	Armenia	DNF
—	Lucien Dirksz	Aruba	DNF
—	Aleksandr Sharapov	Belarus	DNF
—	Oleg Bondarik	Belarus	DNF
—	Vyacheslav German	Belarus	DNF
—	Elliot Hubbard	Bermuda	DNF
—	Hernandes Quadri	Brazil	DNF
—	Márcio May	Brazil	DNF
—	Daniel Rogelim	Brazil	DNF
—	Jamil Suaiden	Brazil	DNF
—	Stefan Baraud	Cayman Islands	DNF
—	Víctor Garrido	Chile	DNF
—	Dubán Ramírez	Colombia	DNF
—	Raúl Montaña	Colombia	DNF
—	Héctor Chiles	Ecuador	DNF
—	Paulo Caicedo	Ecuador	DNF
—	Pedro Rodríguez	Ecuador	DNF
—	Lauri Resik	Estonia	DNF
—	Brian Smith	Great Britain	DNF
—	Michael Rich	Germany	DNF
—	Uwe Peschel	Germany	DNF
—	Anton Villatoro	Guatemala	DNF
—	Edwin Santos	Guatemala	DNF
—	Felipe López	Guatemala	DNF
—	Marlon Paniagua	Guatemala	DNF
—	Omar Ochoa	Guatemala	DNF
—	Wong Kam Po	Hong Kong	DNF
—	László Bodrogi	Hungary	DNF
—	Kazuyuki Manabe	Japan	DNF
—	Osamu Sumida	Japan	DNF
—	Park Min-su	South Korea	DNF
—	Yousef Shadi	Libya	DNF
—	Raimondas Rumšas	Lithuania	DNF
—	Ivanas Romanovas	Lithuania	DNF
—	Linas Balčiūnas	Lithuania	DNF
—	Raimondas Vilčinskas	Lithuania	DNF
—	Adan Juárez	Mexico	DNF
—	Domingo González	Mexico	DNF
—	Igor Pugaci	Moldova	DNF
—	Ruslan Ivanov	Moldova	DNF
—	Igor Bonciucov	Moldova	DNF
—	Oleg Tonoritchi	Moldova	DNF
—	Dashnyamyn Tömör-Ochir	Mongolia	DNF
—	Glen Mitchell	New Zealand	DNF
—	Scott Guyton	New Zealand	DNF
—	Brian Fowler	New Zealand	DNF
—	Svein-Gaute Hølestøl	Norway	DNF
—	Youssef Khanfar Al-Shakali	Oman	DNF
—	Dariusz Baranowski	Poland	DNF
—	José Azevedo	Portugal	DNF
—	Róbert Nagy	Slovakia	DNF
—	Miroslav Lipták	Slovakia	DNF
—	Michael Andersson	Sweden	DNF
—	Chen Chih-hao	Chinese Taipei	DNF
—	Mykhailo Khalilov	Ukraine	DNF
—	Volodymyr Pulnikov	Ukraine	DNF
—	Ali Sayed Darwish	United Arab Emirates	DNF
—	Gregorio Bare	Uruguay	DNF
—	Ricardo Guedes	Uruguay	DNF
—	Manuel Guevara	Venezuela	DNF
—	Carlos Maya	Venezuela	DNF
—	José Balaustre	Venezuela	DNF
—	Rubén Abreu	Venezuela	DNF
—	Timothy Jones	Zimbabwe	DNF

== Sources ==
- Official Report
