= Eduardo Uribe (cyclist) =

Mexican cyclist

Personal information
- Born: 11 March 1970 (age 56)

Cycling career
- Sport: Cycling

Eduardo Uribe (born 11 March 1970) is a Mexican cyclist. He competed in the men's individual road race at the 1996 Summer Olympics.
