= Edwin Santos =

Guatemalan cyclist

Personal information
- Born: 8 January 1972 (age 54)

Cycling career
- Sport: Cycling

Edwin Santos (born 8 January 1972) is a Guatemalan cyclist. He competed in the men's individual road race at the 1996 Summer Olympics.
