= Óscar Giraldo =

Colombian cyclist

Óscar Alveiro Giraldo
Personal information
- Full name: Óscar Alveiro Giraldo
- Born: 13 April 1973 Bogotá, Colombia
- Died: 24 August 2021 (aged 48)

Cycling career
- Sport: Cycling

Óscar Alveiro Giraldo (13 April 1973 – 24 August 2021) was a Colombian cyclist. He competed in the men's individual road race at the 1996 Summer Olympics. He also won the 1994 Pan American Road Race Championships.
