= William Lara =

Cuban wrestler (born 1968)

Personal information
- Nationality: Cuban
- Born: 17 January 1968 (age 58) Havana, Cuba

Sport
- Sport: Wrestling
Medal record
Representing Cuba
Pan American Games
Silver medal – second place	1995 Mar del Plata	Bantamweight
Central American and Caribbean Games
Gold medal – first place	1993 Ponce	Bantamweight

William Lara Díaz (born 17 January 1968) is a Cuban wrestler. He competed in the men's Greco-Roman 57 kg at the 1992 Summer Olympics.
