= Lauri Resik =

Estonian cyclist

Personal information
- Born: 28 November 1969 (age 56) Tallinn, then part of Estonian SSR, Soviet Union

Cycling career
- Sport: Cycling

Lauri Resik (born 28 November 1969) is an Estonian cyclist. He competed in the men's individual road race at the 1996 Summer Olympics.
