= Omar Ochoa (cyclist) =

Guatemalan cyclist

Personal information
- Born: 12 September 1971 (age 55)

Cycling career
- Sport: Cycling

Omar Ochoa (born 12 September 1971) is a Guatemalan cyclist. He competed in the men's individual road race at the 1996 Summer Olympics.
