= Oleg Bondarik =

Belarusian cyclist

Personal information
- Born: 22 August 1976 (age 50) Minsk, Belarus

Cycling career
- Sport: Cycling

Oleg Bondarik (born 22 August 1976) is a Belarusian cyclist. He competed in the men's individual road race at the 1996 Summer Olympics.
