= Gustavo Artacho =

Argentine cyclist

Personal information
- Born: 15 September 1967 (age 59) Buenos Aires, Argentina

Cycling career
- Sport: Cycling
Medal record
Representing Argentina
Pan American Games
Bronze medal – third place	1999 Winnipeg	Team pursuit

Gustavo Artacho (born 15 September 1967) is an Argentine cyclist. He competed in the men's individual road race at the 1996 Summer Olympics.
