= Markus Andersson (cyclist) =

Swedish cyclist

Personal information
- Born: 17 February 1973 (age 53) Stockholm, Sweden

Cycling career
- Sport: Cycling

Markus Andersson (born 17 February 1973) is a Swedish cyclist. He competed in the men's individual road race at the 1996 Summer Olympics.
