= Márlon Paniagua =

Guatemalan cyclist

Personal information
- Born: 23 June 1974 (age 52)

Cycling career
- Sport: Cycling

Márlon Paniagua (born 23 June 1974) is a Guatemalan cyclist. He competed in the men's individual road race at the 1996 Summer Olympics.
