= Felipe López (cyclist) =

Guatemalan cyclist

Personal information
- Born: 14 May 1969 (age 57)

Cycling career
- Sport: Cycling

Felipe López (born 14 May 1969) is a Guatemalan cyclist. He competed in the men's individual road race at the 1996 Summer Olympics.
