= Sławomir Chrzanowski =

Polish cyclist

Personal information
- Born: 24 January 1969 (age 57) Dzierżoniów, Poland

Cycling career
- Sport: Cycling

Sławomir Chrzanowski (born 24 January 1969) is a Polish former cyclist. He competed in the men's individual road race at the 1996 Summer Olympics.
