= Aleksandr Sharapov =

Belarusian cyclist

Personal information
- Born: 31 May 1971 (age 55) Minsk, Belarus

Cycling career
- Sport: Cycling

Aleksandr Sharapov (born 31 May 1971) is a Belarusian cyclist. He competed in the men's individual road race at the 1996 Summer Olympics.
