= Luis Sarmiento =

Cuban wrestler

Personal information
- Born: 7 October 1971 (age 54) Camagüey, Cuba

Sport
- Sport: Wrestling

Luis Sarmiento (born 7 October 1971) is a Cuban wrestler. He competed in the men's Greco-Roman 57 kg at the 1996 Summer Olympics.
