= Dzintra Blūma =

Latvian slalom canoer (born 1958)

Dzintra Blūma (born 26 January 1958, in Riga) is a Latvian slalom canoer who competed in the early to mid-1990s. Competing in two Summer Olympics, she earned her best finish of 24th in the K-1 event in Barcelona in 1992.
