= Nabil Salhi =

Tunisian wrestler

Personal information
- Nationality: Tunisian
- Born: 22 May 1971 (age 55)

Sport
- Sport: Wrestling

Nabil Salhi (born 22 May 1971) is a Tunisian wrestler. He competed in the men's Greco-Roman 57 kg at the 1996 Summer Olympics.
