= Arutik Rubenian =

Armenian-Greek Greco Roman wrestler

Personal information
- Born: 5 July 1966 (age 60) Tselinograd, Soviet Kazakhstan
- Height: 1.64 m (5 ft 4 1/2 in)
- Weight: 65 kg (143 lb)

Sport
- Sport: Wrestling
- Event: Greco-Roman
- Club: BAO Thessaloniki
- Coached by: Aram Sargsyan; Dimitrios Moraitis
Medal record
Greco-Roman wrestling
Representing Greece
European Championships
Silver medal – second place	1994 Athens	57 kg
Mediterranean Games
Bronze medal – third place	1997 Bari	63 kg
Representing Soviet Union
European Championships
Bronze medal – third place	1988 Kolbotn	62 kg
World Cup
Gold medal – first place	1990 Gothenburg	62 kg
Silver medal – second place	1991 Thessaloniki	62 kg

Arutik (Aristeidis) Rubenian (Greek: Αριστείδης Ρουμπενιαν, born 5 June 1966) is a retired Armenian-Greek Greco Roman wrestler. He is a two-time European Championship medalist, five-time Greek Champion, Soviet Champion, World Cup winner, and Olympic participant.

== Biography ==
Arutik Rubenian was born on 5 July 1966 to an Armenian family in Tselinograd (now Astana), Soviet Kazakhstan. In 1969 his family moved to Leninakan (now Gyumri), Soviet Armenia, where at the age of 9 he started practicing Greco-Roman wrestling under the guidance of Aram Sargsyan. He became a 1984 Junior European Champion and 1985 Espoir World Champion. In 1988 he won a bronze medal at the European Wrestling Championships and came in first at the Soviet Championship. As part of the Soviet national team he won gold in 1990 and silver in 1991 at the Wrestling World Cup.

In 1992 he moved to Greece and later played for the country under the name of Aristidis Rubenian. He won a bronze medal at the 1994 European Championships, competed at the 1996 Summer Olympics in Atlanta, and won a bronze medal at the 1997 Mediterranean Games.

He has been coaching since 2000. From 2000 to 2009 (with a short break) Rubenian was one of the coaches of the Greece national team and trained European Champion and Olympic medalist Artiom Kiouregkian. Since February 2012, he works as a trainer in the wrestling club "Makedones evosmoc" from the city of Thessaloniki.
