= Ansis Dāle =

Latvian windsurfer (born 1967)

Personal information
- Nationality: Latvian
- Born: 14 September 1967 (age 58) Riga, Latvia

Sport
- Sport: Windsurfing

Ansis Dāle (born 14 September 1967) is a Latvian windsurfer. He competed at the 1992 Summer Olympics and the 1996 Summer Olympics.
