= Keijo Pehkonen =

Finnish wrestler (born 1964)

Personal information
- Nationality: Finnish
- Born: 11 November 1964 (age 60); Heinola, Finland

Sport
- Sport: Wrestling

Keijo Pehkonen (born 11 November 1964) is a Finnish wrestler. He competed at the 1988 Summer Olympics and the 1992 Summer Olympics.
