= Valery Nikonorov =

Russian wrestler

Personal information
- Nationality: Russian
- Born: 26 August 1971 (age 54) Moscow, Russia

Sport
- Sport: Wrestling

Valery Nikonorov (born 26 August 1971) is a Russian wrestler. He competed in the men's Greco-Roman 58 kg at the 2000 Summer Olympics.
