= Abderrahman Naanaa =

Moroccan wrestler

Personal information
- Nationality: Moroccan
- Born: 17 June 1965 (age 59)

Sport
- Sport: Wrestling

Abderrahman Naanaa (born 17 June 1965) is a Moroccan wrestler. He competed at the 1988 Summer Olympics and the 1992 Summer Olympics.
