= Vladimirs Morozovs =

Latvian weightlifter (born 1966)

Personal information
- Nationality: Latvian
- Born: 21 April 1966 (age 59) Riga, Latvia

Sport
- Sport: Weightlifting

Vladimirs Morozovs (born 21 April 1966) is a Latvian weightlifter. He competed in the men's flyweight event at the 1996 Summer Olympics.
