= Ivars Zdanovskis =

Latvian weightlifter (born 1965)

Personal information
- Nationality: Latvian
- Born: 8 June 1965 (age 60) Riga, Latvia

Sport
- Sport: Weightlifting

Ivars Zdanovskis (born 8 June 1965) is a Latvian weightlifter. He competed in the men's heavyweight I event at the 1996 Summer Olympics.
