= Miguel Ángel Sierra (wrestler) =

Spanish wrestler (born 1971)

Personal information
- Nationality: Spanish
- Born: 23 October 1971 (age 54) Seville, Spain

Sport
- Sport: Wrestling

Miguel Ángel Sierra (born 23 October 1971) is a Spanish wrestler. He competed in the men's Greco-Roman 57 kg at the 1992 Summer Olympics.
