= Jonas Romanovas =

Lithuanian cyclist (born 1957)

Personal information
- Born: 4 August 1957 (age 69) Kretingalė, Lithuania

Cycling career
- Sport: Cycling

Jonas Romanovas (born 4 August 1957) is a Lithuanian cyclist. He competed in the men's individual road race at the 1996 Summer Olympics.
