= Sardar Pashaei =

Iranian wrestler (born 1979)

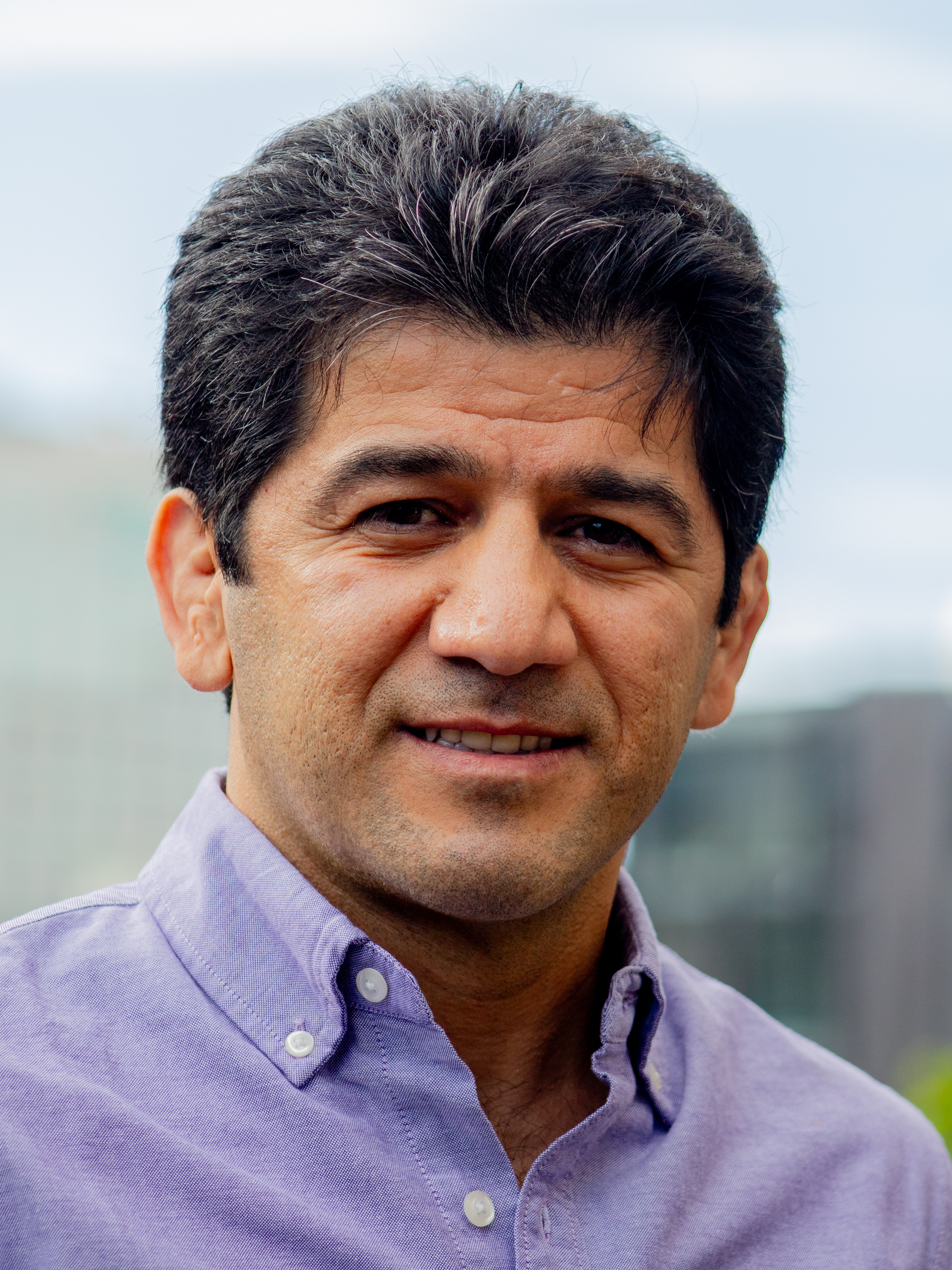
- Sardar Pashaei at Oslo Freedom Forum 2025

Personal information
- Native name: سردار پاشایی
- Born: Sardar Pashaei; 12 May 1979 (age 46) Saqqez, Iran
- Occupation: Wrestler
- Years active: 1995–2015

Sardar Pashaei
Medal record

Representing Iran

Youth Greco-Roman wrestling

World Championships
Gold medal – first place	1998 World Youth Champion in Cairo	60 kg

Asian Championships
Gold medal – first place	1998 FILA Asian Youth Champion in Kazakhstan	60 kg

Universiade

Sardar Pashaei (Persian: سردار پاشایی, Sorani Kurdish: سەردار پاشائی; born 12 May 1979) is a retired national wrestler, medalist and coach of the Iranian national youth wrestling team. He won the Asian Youth Wrestling Championship in 1998 in Kazakhstan and the same year won the World Youth Wrestling Championship in Cairo and won the gold medal. He currently lives in the United States and is one of the main leaders of the Navid Afkari campaign.

== Biography ==
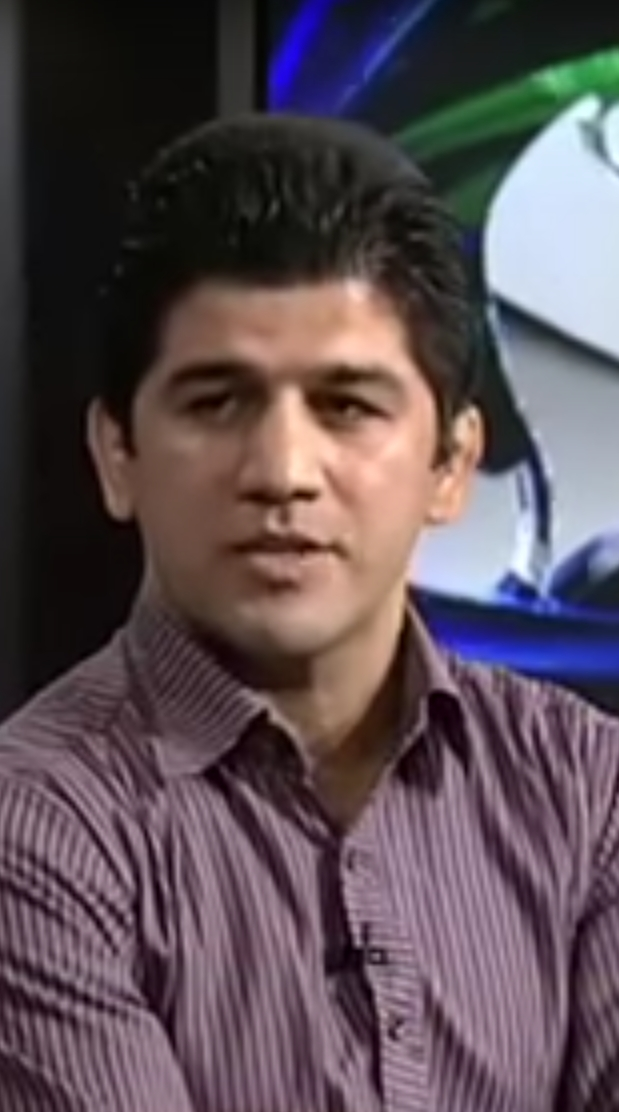
Sardar Pashaei doing an interview with VOA Farsi in 2010.

Sardar Pashaei was born in Saqqez, Iran in 1979 and completed his primary education in the same city. Later, he continued his education at the University of Tehran and was able to obtain a Master of Physical Education and Sports Science. Due to the fact that wrestling has a special place in Saqqez and many champions of this city had emerged in the international arena like abdollah Chamangoli, he also entered this sport and learned the advanced techniques of this sport from experienced coaches. Then he was able to win first places in regional and national competitions.

== Championship titles ==
Summary of titles he has won include:

- Asian Youth Champion in 1998 Kazakhstan
- World Youth Champion in 1998 Cairo
- Runner-up in international competitions in Romania
- Member of the Iranian national team in the Asian Games in Bangkok
- The star of the national team selection competitions from the age category of juniors to adults
- Member of the national youth team in the Bucharest World Championships
- Coach of the national youth team in 2007; Win the Asian Championship in the Philippines and the third world title in China
- Coach of the national youth team in 2008; Win the Asian Championship in Qatar and the second world title in Turkey
- Coach of the national youth freestyle wrestling team in 2009; Win the Asian Championship in the Philippines and the third world title in Turkey

== Immigration to the United States ==
Sardar Pashaei, however, quietly immigrated to the United States while the Iranian sports authorities were indifferent about it. He protested against discrimination against Kurds in Iranian sports. For instance, several months the state media in Iran published numerous reports and articles about the presence of Ahmad Reza Abedzadeh's son in the United States, who has no sports background in Iran but they turned a blind eye to one of Iran's national sports elites, who has made the country proud many times. But Rebecca Leit, a former US tennis champion, praised the Iranian champion's bodybuilding methods in an interview with the Washington Post. During this time, Sardar Pashaei has occasionally appeared as a sports expert on VOA. He holds a degree from the American National Academy of Medical Sciences and is currently coaching in the United States.

== United for Navid Campaign ==
Navid Afkari was one of the professional wrestlers in the Iranian national team who was arrested by the Iranian government in 2020 and later sentenced to death after a trial and interrogation. This decision of the Iranian government led to the reaction of sports heroes around the world, including Sedar Pashaei. Pashaei, as the coach of the Iranian national youth wrestling team and due to his close relationship with the wrestlers of this team, including Navid Afkari, reacted more strongly than others and participated in the Alliance campaign for Navid to try to dissuade the Iranian government from executing Navid. Finally, despite international protests, Navid was executed in 2021. In this regard, Sardar Pashaei interviewed media in the world such as CNN, BBC, DW and so on and tried to draw the attention of the international community to the situation of Iranian athletes under the rule of The Islamic republic government.
