= Dainis Zīlītis =

Latvian weightlifter (born 1969)

Personal information
- Nationality: Latvian
- Born: 14 September 1969 (age 56) Saldus, Latvia

Sport
- Sport: Weightlifting

Dainis Zīlītis (born 14 September 1969) is a Latvian weightlifter. He competed in the men's light heavyweight event at the 1996 Summer Olympics.
