= Aldis Kļaviņš =

Latvian canoeist (1975–2000)

Aldis Kļaviņš (30 April 1975 – 1 August 2000) was a Latvian slalom canoer who competed from the early 1990s to the early 2000s. He finished 21st in the K-1 event at the 1996 Summer Olympics in Atlanta.
