= Ilona Dzelme =

Latvian windsurfer (born 1966)

Personal information
- Full name: Ilona Dzelme-Grīnberga
- Born: 11 January 1966 (age 59) Saulkrasti, Latvia
- Height: 168 cm (5 ft 6 in)
- Weight: 62 kg (137 lb; 9 st 11 lb)

Sport
- Sport: Windsurfing

Ilona Grīnberga (née Dzelme, born 11 January 1966) is a Latvian windsurfer. She competed in the 1992 Summer Olympics and the 1996 Summer Olympics.
