= Romāns Kukļins =

Latvian boxer (born 1974)

Personal information
- Nationality: Latvian
- Born: 13 September 1974 (age 51) Riga, Latvia

Sport
- Sport: Boxing

Romāns Kukļins (born 13 September 1974) is a Latvian boxer. He competed in the men's heavyweight event at the 1996 Summer Olympics.
