= Stanisław Pawłowski =

Polish wrestler

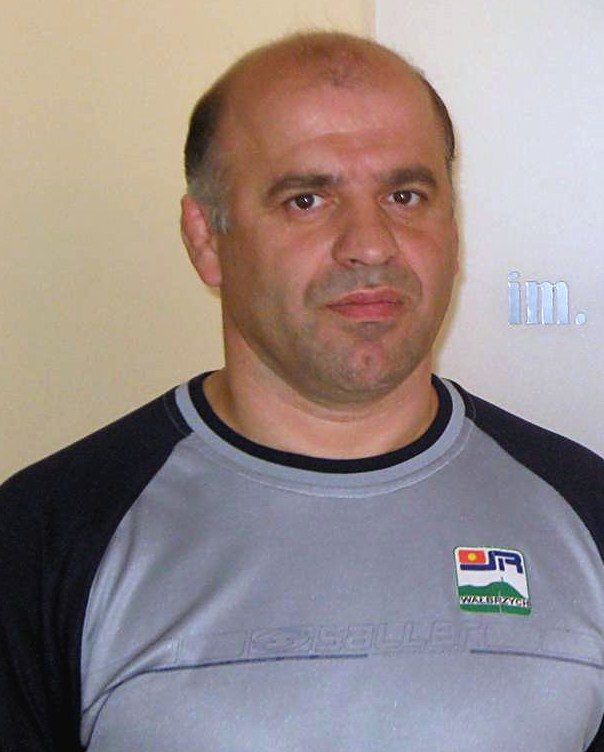
- Stanisław Pawłowski

Personal information
- Nationality: Polish
- Born: 8 May 1966 (age 60) Wałbrzych, Poland

Sport
- Sport: Wrestling

Stanisław Pawłowski (born 8 May 1966) is a Polish wrestler. He competed in the men's Greco-Roman 57 kg at the 1996 Summer Olympics.
