= Víctor Capacho =

Colombian wrestler (born 1968)

Personal information
- Nationality: Colombian
- Born: 22 February 1968 (age 58)

Sport
- Sport: Wrestling

Víctor Capacho (born 22 February 1968) is a Colombian wrestler. He competed in the men's Greco-Roman 48 kg at the 1988 Summer Olympics.
