= Park Chi-ho =

South Korean wrestler

Personal information
- Nationality: South Korean
- Born: 15 September 1972 (age 53)

Sport
- Sport: Wrestling

Park Chi-ho (born 15 September 1972) is a South Korean wrestler. He competed in the men's Greco-Roman 57 kg at the 1996 Summer Olympics.
