= Oleksandr Stepanyan =

Armenian-Ukrainian Olympic wrestler

Personal information
- Born: 10 January 1968 (age 58)
- Height: 1.63 m (5 ft 4 in)
- Weight: 58 kg (128 lb)

Sport
- Sport: Wrestling
- Event: Greco-Roman
- Club: Dynamo Simferopol
- Coached by: G. Shostak

Oleksandr Stepanyan (Ukrainian: Олександр Степанян, born 10 January 1968) is a retired Armenian-Ukrainian Greco Roman wrestler. He competed at the 2000 Summer Olympics.
