= Aghasi Manukyan =

Armenian Greco-Roman wrestler (1967–2018)

Personal information
- Born: 27 March 1967 Leninakan, Armenian SSR, Soviet Union
- Died: 19 March 2018 (aged 51) Marquette, Michigan, U.S.
- Height: 1.65 m (5 ft 5 in)
- Weight: 60 kg (130 lb)

Sport
- Sport: Wrestling
- Event: Greco-Roman
- Coached by: Aram Sargsyan
Medal record
Men's Greco-Roman wrestling
Representing Armenia
World Championships
Gold medal – first place	1993 Stockholm	57 kg
European Championships
Silver medal – second place	1994 Athens	62 kg
Silver medal – second place	1995 Besançon	57 kg
Representing Soviet Union
World Cup
Gold medal – first place	1988 Athens	57 kg

Aghasi Manukyan (Armenian: Աղասի Մանուկյան, 27 February 1967 – 19 March 2018) was an Armenian Greco-Roman wrestler. He was a World Cup winner and World Champion. Manukyan earned the Honoured Master of Sports of the USSR Master of Sports of International Class title in 1987.

== Biography ==
Aghasi Manukyan was born 27 February 1967 in Leninakan (now Gyumri), Soviet Armenia. He started wrestling in 1977 under the coaching of Aram Sargsyan. In 1984 he won the Espoir European Championships and in 1987 he won the Espoir World Championships. Manukyan was recruited into the USSR national Greco-Roman wrestling team in 1988. That same year, he came in first place at the Wrestling World Cup team competition.

After Armenia gained its independence from the Soviet Union, Manukyan began representing his native country. Manukyan won a gold medal at the 1993 World Wrestling Championships in his debut as an Armenian wrestler. Manukyan was the first ever wrestler from the independent Armenia to become a Wrestling World Champion in either Greco-Roman or freestyle wrestling. He was also the second athlete to become a World Champion under the flag of Armenia, after Nshan Munchyan. Manukyan won two silver medals at the European Wrestling Championships in 1994 and 1995. He also competed at the 1996 Summer Olympics in Atlanta.

In 1996, he finished his wrestling career and began coaching. Manukyan coached the Armenian national junior Greco-Roman wrestling team from 1998 to 1999. From 2001 to 2004, he worked in the Sports Committee of the Shirak region of Armenia. In 2006, he moved to the United States. After 2011, he worked at the Olympic training center located in Marquette.

== Personal life ==
Aghasi has two brothers who are also wrestlers. His brother Michael (born 1964) was a Soviet Champion and European Youth Champion of the USSR in Greco-Roman wrestling and his brother Samvel (born 1974) was a Champion of Armenia and fellow Olympian at the 1996 Summer Olympics.
