= Ergüder Bekişdamat =

Turkish wrestler (born 1969)

Personal information
- Nationality: Turkish
- Born: 1 January 1969 (age 57)

Sport
- Sport: Greco-Roman wrestling
Medal record
Greco-Roman wrestling
Representing Turkey
European Championships
Bronze medal – third place	91 Med1997 Kouvola	58 kg

Ergüder Bekişdamat (born 1 January 1969) is a Turkish wrestler competing in the -57 kg division of the Greco-Roman style.

Bekişdamat took part at the World Wrestling Championships in 1991 in Bulgaria, 1997 in Poland and 1998 in Sweden placing respectively 10th, 15th and 11th. He competed in the men's Greco-Roman 57 kg at the 1992 Summer Olympics. He won the bronze medal in the -58 kg division at the 1997 European Wrestling Championships in Kouvola, Finland.

In 2010, he was appointed coach of the Diyanet Youth Sports Club founded in İzmir. Bekişdamat served as the coach of the Turkey cadet national wrestling team, which participated at the 2011 European Cadets Greco-Roman Wrestling Championships in Poland.

He became twice gold medalist at the FILA World Veterans Wrestling Championships held in 2015 at Athens, Greece and in 2016 at Helsinki, Finland.
