= Ruslan Khakymov =

Ukrainian wrestler (born 1969)

Personal information
- Nationality: Ukrainian
- Born: 3 June 1969 (age 57) Mariupol

Sport
- Sport: Wrestling
Medal record
Men's Greco-Roman wrestling
Representing Ukraine
European Championships
Gold medal – first place	1995 Besançon	57 kg
Silver medal – second place	1993 Istanbul	57 kg

Ruslan Khakymov (born 3 June 1969) is a Ukrainian wrestler. He competed in the men's Greco-Roman 57 kg at the 1996 Summer Olympics, where he finished 4th. At the 1996 Games, he lost to Sheng Zetian from China in the bout for bronze.
