= Kim In-sub =

South Korean wrestler (born 1973)

- Hangul: 김인섭
- RR: Gim Inseop
- MR: Kim Insŏp

Kim In-sub
Medal record

Men's Greco-Roman wrestling

Representing South Korea

Olympic Games
Silver medal – second place	2000 Sydney	58 kg

World Championships
Gold medal – first place	1998 Gävle	58 kg
Gold medal – first place	1999 Athens	58 kg
Silver medal – second place	2001 Patras	63 kg

Kim In-sub (Korean: 김인섭; born March 2, 1973) is a retired Korean Greco Roman wrestler. He won two gold medals and one silver medal at the 1998, 1999 and 2001 FILA Wrestling World Championships. Kim was born in Daegu, South Korea.

In the 2000 Summer Olympics in Sydney, Australia, Kim earned a silver medal. He also competed at the 2004 Athens Olympics, but did not win a medal.
