= Armando Fernández (wrestler) =

Mexican wrestler (born 1969)

Personal information
- Full name: Armando Fernández García
- Born: February 9, 1969 (age 57)
Medal record
Men's Wrestling
Representing Mexico
Pan American Games
Bronze medal – third place	1995 Mar del Plata	– 57 kg

Armando Fernández García (born February 9, 1969) is a Mexican former sport wrestler from Xalapa, Veracruz, in eastern Mexico. Nicknamed "La Jarocha" he competed in Olympic wrestling in the 1990s appearing in Wrestling at the 1992 Summer Olympics - Men's Greco-Roman 57 kg and Wrestling at the 1996 Summer Olympics - Men's Greco-Roman 57 kg.
