= Igor Petrenko (wrestler) =

Belarusian wrestler (born 1967)

Personal information
- Nationality: Belarusian
- Born: 8 December 1967 (age 58) Luhansk, Ukraine

Sport
- Sport: Wrestling

Igor Petrenko (born 8 December 1967) is a Belarusian wrestler. He competed at the 1996 Summer Olympics and the 2000 Summer Olympics.
