= David Maia =

Portuguese wrestler

Personal information
- Nationality: Portuguese
- Born: 18 October 1972 (age 53) Arroios, Portugal

Sport
- Sport: Wrestling

David Maia (born 18 October 1972) is a Portuguese wrestler. He competed in the men's Greco-Roman 57 kg at the 1996 Summer Olympics.
