= Constantin Borăscu =

Romanian wrestler

Personal information
- Nationality: Romanian
- Born: 30 January 1974 (age 52) Craiova, Romania

Sport
- Sport: Wrestling

Constantin Borăscu (born 30 January 1974) is a Romanian wrestler. He competed in the men's Greco-Roman 58 kg at the 2000 Summer Olympics.
