= Sarkis Elgkian =

Armenian-Greek wrestler (born 1972)

Personal information
- Born: 24 March 1972 (age 54)
- Height: 1.65 m (5 ft 5 in)
- Weight: 63 kg (139 lb)

Sport
- Sport: Wrestling
- Event: Greco-Roman
- Club: Prodos Athens
- Coached by: Barbis Holidis

Sarkis Elgkian (Greek: Σαρκης Ελγκιαν, born 24 March 1972) is a retired Armenian-Greek Greco Roman wrestler. He competed at the 1996 Summer Olympics, where he came in 7th place.
