= Koba Guliashvili =

Georgian wrestler

Personal information
- Nationality: Georgian
- Born: 13 April 1968 (age 58) Martqopi, Georgia

Sport
- Sport: Wrestling

Koba Guliashvili (born 13 April 1968) is a Georgian wrestler. He competed at the 1996 Summer Olympics and the 2000 Summer Olympics.
