= Vilayet Aghayev =

Azerbaijani wrestler

Personal information
- Nationality: Azerbaijan
- Born: 5 December 1971 (age 53)
- Height: 1.68 m (5 ft 6 in)
- Weight: 62 kg (137 lb)

Sport
- Sport: Wrestling

Vilayet Aghayev (born 5 December 1971) is an Azerbaijani wrestler. He competed in the 1996 Summer Olympics.
