= Kenkichi Nishimi =

Japanese wrestler (born 1967)

Personal information
- Nationality: Japanese
- Born: 27 April 1967 (age 59) Kagoshima Prefecture, Japan

Sport
- Sport: Wrestling

Kenkichi Nishimi (西見 健吉, Nishimi Kenkichi; born 27 April 1967) is a Japanese wrestler. He competed in the men's Greco-Roman 57 kg at the 1996 Summer Olympics.
