= Yuriy Melnichenko =

Kazakhstani wrestler (born 1972)

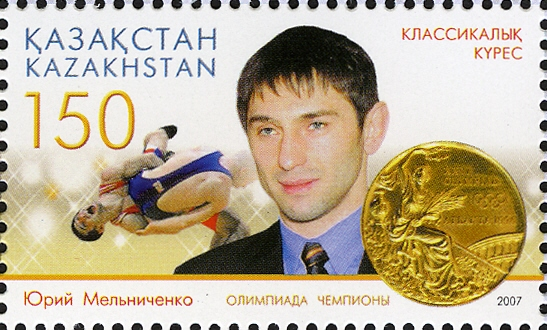
- Melnichenko on a 2007 Kazakhstani stamp

Personal information
- Born: 5 June 1972 (age 54) Jalal-Abad, Kirghiz SSR, Soviet Union

Sport
- Sport: Greco-Roman wrestling
- Club: Daulet, Almaty
Medal record
Men's Greco-Roman wrestling
Representing Kazakhstan
Olympic Games
Gold medal – first place	1996 Atlanta	57 kg
World Championships
Gold medal – first place	1994 Tampere	57 kg
Gold medal – first place	1997 Wrocław	57 kg
Silver medal – second place	1995 Prague	57 kg
Silver medal – second place	1999 Athens	57 kg
Asian Games
Gold medal – first place	1994 Hiroshima	57 kg
Asian Championships
Gold medal – first place	1996 Xiaoshan	57 kg
Gold medal – first place	1997 Tehran	57 kg
Silver medal – second place	1999 Tashkent	57 kg

Yuriy Vasilyevich Melnichenko (Russian: Юрий Васильевич Мельниченко; born 5 June 1972) is a Kazakhstani wrestler who won the gold medal in the Greco-Roman bantamweight (52–57 kg) category at the 1996 Summer Olympics. He competed at the next Olympics in the featherweight division and finished 19th.

After retiring from competing, Melnichenko worked as a wrestling coach. Between 2000 and 2004 he led the national team, and after that acted as vice-president of the national wrestling federation. Georgiy Tsurtsumia was his trainee.

In August 2023, he was appointed head coach of the national Greco-Roman wrestling team of Kazakhstan.
