= Djamel Ainaoui =

French wrestler

Personal information
- Nationality: France
- Born: 20 March 1975 (age 51) Courrières, France
- Height: 1.75 m (5 ft 9 in)
- Weight: 58 kg (128 lb)

Sport
- Sport: Wrestling

Djamel Ainaoui (born 20 March 1975) is a French wrestler. He competed in the 2000 Summer Olympics.
