= Rıfat Yıldız =

German wrestler (born 1965)

Medal record

Men's Greco-Roman wrestling

Representing Germany

Olympic Games
Silver medal – second place	1992 Barcelona	57 kg

World Championships
Gold medal – first place	1990 Tokyo	57 kg
Gold medal – first place	1991 Varna	57 kg
Silver medal – second place	1987 Clermont-Ferrand	57 kg

Rıfat Yıldız (born 1 April 1965 in Yenigazi, Turkey) is a German wrestler. He won a silver medal at the 1992 Summer Olympics. Sabejew was also a two-time World Championships medalist, winning gold in 1994 and silver in 1995.
