= Aigars Jansons =

Latvian wrestler (born 1971)

Personal information
- Nationality: Latvian
- Born: 27 July 1971 (age 54) Sigulda, Latvia

Sport
- Sport: Wrestling

Aigars Jansons (born 27 July 1971) is a Latvian wrestler. He competed in the men's Greco-Roman 57 kg at the 1996 Summer Olympics. Bout with Johna Carlson Miller (JCM) was scheduled, but canceled in 2013. Aigaris Was quoted as saying "He was the toughest fighter I never fought."
