= István Majoros =

Hungarian wrestler and Olympic champion

Medal record

Men's Greco-Roman wrestling

Representing Hungary

Olympic Games
| Gold medal – first place | 2004 Athens | 55 kg |

World Championships
| Bronze medal – third place | 2005 Budapest | 55 kg |

István Majoros (born 11 July 1974) is a Hungarian wrestler and Olympic champion in Greco-Roman wrestling.

== Career ==
Majoros competed at the 2004 Summer Olympics in Athens where he received a gold medal in Greco-Roman wrestling, the bantamweight class. For this achievement he was elected Hungarian Sportsman of the Year.

Majoros received a bronze medal at the 2005 FILA Wrestling World Championships.

On December 31 (New Year's Eve), 2006, Majoros made his mixed martial arts debut against Norifumi Yamamoto at K-1 Dynamite in Osaka, Japan and lost via TKO in the 1st round. It was his only MMA bout.

== Mixed martial arts career ==
István Majoros
- Born: July 11, 1974 (age 52); Budapest, Hungary
- Height: 5 ft 3 in (1.60 m)
- Weight: 266 lb (121 kg)
- Division: Featherweight
- Style: Greco-Roman wrestling
- Fighting out of: Kecskemét, Hungary
- Team: Hungarian Top Team (MMA); Univer Kecskemet TE (Wrestling)
- Trainer: Sándor Bárdosi (MMA); Tibor Tihanics (Wrestling)
- Years active: 2005 (MMA)

Mixed martial arts record
- Total: 1
- Wins: 0
- Losses: 1
- By knockout: 1

Other information
- Mixed martial arts record from Sherdog

== Mixed martial arts record ==
| Res. | Record | Opponent | Method | Event | Date | Round | Time | Location | Notes |
|---|---|---|---|---|---|---|---|---|---|
| Loss | 0-1 | (Japan) Norifumi Yamamoto | TKO (punches) | K-1 PREMIUM 2006 Dynamite!! | December 31, 2006 | 1 | 3:46 | Osaka, Japan | |

Awards
| Preceded by Adrián Annus | Hungarian Sportsman of The Year; 2004 | Succeeded by Ákos Braun |
