= Dennis Hall =

American wrestler (born 1971)

Personal information
- Full name: Dennis William Hall
- Born: February 5, 1971 (age 55) Milwaukee, Wisconsin, U.S.

Sport
- Country: United States
- Sport: Wrestling
- Event: Greco-Roman
- Club: Sunkist Kids Wrestling Club
- Team: USA
Medal record
Men's Greco-Roman wrestling
Representing the United States
Olympic Games
Silver medal – second place	1996 Atlanta	57 kg
World Championships
Gold medal – first place	1995 Atlanta	57 kg
Bronze medal – third place	1994 Istanbul	57 kg
Pan American Games
Gold medal – first place	1995 Mar del Plata	57 kg
Gold medal – first place	1999 Winnipeg	58 kg
Pan American Championships
Gold medal – first place	2000 Cali	58 kg

Dennis William Hall (born February 5, 1971) is an American former Greco-Roman wrestler. Hall was a 10-time US National Champion, a World Champion, and 3-time USA Olympian. He won a silver medal at the 1996 Atlanta Olympics.

Hall attended Hartford Union High School and began his career by defeating a two-time senior state champion in the state finals as a freshman. Hall finished his prep career with a 146-1-1 prep record including 110 pins, earning three individual Wisconsin state titles. During his high school years he was also a three-time Junior National Greco Champion and World Team member. He was Wisconsin's first Dream Team All-American.

Hall attended the University of Wisconsin–Madison on a full scholarship for one year. He realized that in order for him to reach his full potential as an international Greco wrestler, he would need to train differently than he would for collegiate wrestling. He dropped out of school to train, travel and compete with the US Greco team. Hall was named USA Wrestling Man of the Year in 1995 as well as three time Greco-Roman athlete of the year in 1994, 1995 and 1996.

Hall also competed at the amateur wrestling vs submission grappling event The Contenders on October 11, 1997, losing to Joao Roque by decision. He made his mixed martial arts debut on January 17, 1998 against Noboru Asahi, losing via armbar in the second round.

Now retired from competitive wrestling, Hall lives in Plover, Wisconsin.

In 2011, Hall was inducted into the National Wrestling Hall of Fame as a Distinguished Member.

== Notable achievements ==
- World Bronze Medalist 1994
- World Champion 1995
- Olympic Silver Medalist 1996
- 3X High School State Champion
- 3X Junior National US Champion
- Espoir National Champion
- 10X US Open National Champion
- 3X Pan Am Champion

== Submission grappling record ==
Result	Opponent	Method	Event	Date	Round	Time	Notes
Loss	(Brazil) João Roque	Decision	The Contenders	1997	1	10:00	

== Mixed martial arts record ==
Res.	Record	Opponent	Method	Event	Date	Round	Time	Location	Notes
Loss	0-1	(Japan) Noboru Asahi	Submission (Armbar)	Shooto - Las Grandes Viajes 1	January 17, 1998	2	4:18	Tokyo, Japan	
