= Sheng Zetian =

Chinese wrestler (born 1973)

Personal information
- Born: November 15, 1973 (age 52) Anhui, China
- Weight: 58 kg (128 lb)

Sport
- Sport: Greco-Roman wrestling
Medal record
Men's Greco-Roman wrestling
Representing China
Olympic Games
Bronze medal – third place	1992 Barcelona	57 kg
Bronze medal – third place	1996 Atlanta	57 kg
Bronze medal – third place	2000 Sydney	58 kg
World Championships
Silver medal – second place	1998 Gävle	58 kg

Sheng Zetian (Chinese: 盛泽田; born November 15, 1973) is a male Chinese wrestler. He competed at the 1992, 1996 and 2000 Olympic Games, winning a bronze medal in Greco-Roman wrestling on each occasion.
