= Remigijus Šukevičius =

Lithuanian wrestler (born 1970)

Personal information
- Nationality: Lithuanian
- Born: 3 May 1970 (age 56)

Sport
- Sport: Wrestling

Remigijus Šukevičius (born 3 May 1970) is a Lithuanian wrestler. He competed at the 1992 Summer Olympics and the 1996 Summer Olympics.
