= Boxing at the 1996 Summer Olympics – Light middleweight =

Boxing competitions

Light middleweight boxing at the Games of the XXVI Olympiad
- Venue: Alexander Memorial Coliseum
- Dates: 23 July – 3 August 1996
- Competitors: 31 from 31 nations

Medalists
1st place, gold medalist(s)		David Reid	United States
2nd place, silver medalist(s)		Alfredo Duvergel	Cuba
3rd place, bronze medalist(s)		Karim Tulaganov	Uzbekistan
3rd place, bronze medalist(s)		Yermakhan Ibraimov	Kazakhstan

The light middleweight class in the boxing at the 1996 Summer Olympics competition was the fourth-heaviest class at the 1996 Summer Olympics in Atlanta, Georgia. The weight class was open for boxers weighing more than 71 kilograms. The competition in the Alexander Memorial Coliseum started on 1996-07-20 and ended on 1996-08-04.

== Medalists ==
Gold	David Reid; United States
Silver	Alfredo Duvergel; Cuba
Bronze	Karim Tulaganov; Uzbekistan
Bronze	Yermakhan Ibraimov; Kazakhstan

== Results ==
Round of 32
Jorge Silva (BRA)	7
Rival Cadeau (SEY)	22
Oscar Gomez (ARG)	2:50
Karim Tulaganov (UZB)	RSC-3
Kurt Sinette (TRI)	10
Yared Woldemichael (ETH)	11
David Reid (USA)	20
Lee Wan-gyun (KOR)	4
Pavol Polakovič (CZE)	8
Victor Kunene (RSA)	1
Mohamed Salah Marmouri (TUN)	11
Maselino Masoe (ASA)	8
Sean Black (JAM)	7
Jørn Johnson (NOR)	13
Gyorgy Mizsei (HUN)	10
Richard Rowles (AUS)	2
Markus Beyer (GER)	17
Francisc Vastag (ROM)	12
Hendrik Simangunsong (INA)	12
Alexander Kwangwari (ZIM)	1
Nick Farrell (CAN)	4
Yermakhan Ibraimov (KAZ)	15
Albert Eromosele (NGR)	4
Serhiy Horodnichov (UKR)	18
Alfredo Duvergel (CUB)	10
Józef Gilewski (POL)	2
José Luis Quiñones (PUR)	8
Antonio Perugino (ITA)	10
Roger Pettersson (SWE)	7
Shohrat Kurbanov (TKM)	2

Round of 16
Ashiakwei Aryee (GHA)	6
Rival Cadeau (SEY)	22
Karim Tulaganov (UZB)	13
Yared Wolde (ETH)	9
David Reid (USA)	12
Pavol Polakovič (CZE)	5
Mohamed Salah Marmouri (TUN)	17
Jørn Johnson (NOR)	4
Gyorgy Mizsei (HUN)	6
Markus Beyer (GER)	14
Hendrik Mangunsong (INA)	2:14
Yermakhan Ibraimov (KAZ)	RSC-1
Serhiy Horodnichov (UKR)	2
Alfredo Duvergel (CUB)	15
Antonio Perugino (ITA)	18
Roger Pettersson (SWE)	4

Quarterfinals
Rival Cadeau (SEY)	1:24
Karim Tulaganov (UZB)	RSCH-1
David Reid (USA)	13
Mohamed Salah Marmouri (TUN)	8
Markus Beyer (GER)	9
Yermakhan Ibraimov (KAZ)	19
Alfredo Duvergel (CUB)	15
Antonio Perugino (ITA)	8

Semifinals
Karim Tulaganov (UZB)	4
David Reid (USA)	12
Yermakhan Ibraimov (KAZ)	19
Alfredo Duvergel (CUB)	28

Final
David Reid (USA)	KO-3
Alfredo Duvergel (CUB)	0:36
