= Uzbekistan at the 1996 Summer Olympics =

- IOC code: UZB
- NOC: National Olympic Committee of the Republic of Uzbekistan
- Website: www.olympic.uz (in Uzbek and English)

in Atlanta
- Competitors: 71 (63 men and 8 women) in 12 sports
- Flag bearer: Timur Ibragimov
- Medals Ranked 58th: Gold 0 Silver 1 Bronze 1 Total 2

Summer Olympics appearances (overview)
- 1996; 2000; 2004; 2008; 2012; 2016; 2020; 2024

Other related appearances
- Russian Empire (1900–1912); Soviet Union (1952–1988); Unified Team (1992)

Uzbekistan competed in the Summer Olympic Games as an independent nation for the first time at the 1996 Summer Olympics in Atlanta, United States. Previously, Uzbek athletes competed for the Unified Team at the 1992 Summer Olympics. 71 competitors, 63 men and 8 women, took part in 70 events in 12 sports.

== Medalists ==
Medal	Name	Sport	Event
Silver	Armen Bagdasarov	Judo	Men's Middleweight (86 kg)
Bronze	Karim Tulaganov	Boxing	Men's Light Middleweight

== Athletics ==
Men's 100 metres

- Anvar Kuchmuradov

Men's 110m Hurdles

- Yury Aristov

Men's Triple Jump

- Yevgeniy Petin

Men's Decathlon

- Ramil Ganiyev

- Final Result — 8318 points (→ 8th place)

- Oleg Veretelnikov

- Final Result — did not finish (→ no ranking)

Men's Shot Put

- Sergey Kot

Men's Discus Throw

- Roman Poltoratskiy

- Qualification — 51.96m (→ did not advance)

Men's Hammer Throw

- Vitaliy Khozhatelev

- Qualification — 64.52m (→ did not advance)

Men's Javelin Throw

- Sergey Voynov
- Vladimir Parfyonov

Women's 100 metres

- Lyudmila Dmitriady

Women's 200 metres

- Lyudmila Dmitriady

Women's High Jump

- Svetlana Munkova

- Qualification — 1.80m (→ did not advance)

== Boxing ==
Men's Featherweight (– 57 kg)

- Ulugbek Ibragimov

- First Round — Defeated Naramchogt Lamgen (Mongolia), RSC-2
- Second Round — Lost to Falk Huste (Germany), 4-8

Men's Lightweight (– 60 kg)

- Mahammatkodir Abdoollayev

- First Round — Lost to Terrance Cauthen (United States), 6-18

Men's Welterweight (– 67 kg)

- Nariman Atayev

- First Round — Defeated Ashira Evans (Kenya), 15-10
- Second Round — Defeated Nourbek Kassenov (Kyrgyzstan), 11-7
- Quarterfinals — Lost to Daniel Santos (Puerto Rico), 15-28

Men's Light-Middleweight (– 71 kg)

- Karim Tulaganov → Bronze Medal

- First Round — Defeated Oscar Gomez (Argentina), RSC-3 (02:50)
- Second Round — Defeated Yared Wolde (Ethiopia), 13-9
- Quarterfinals — Defeated Rival Cadeau (Seychelles), RSC-1 (1:24)
- Semifinals — Lost to David Reid (United States), 4-12

Men's Middleweight (– 75 kg)

- Dilshod Yarbekov

- First Round — Defeated Brian Johansen (Denmark), RSC-3 (02:47)
- Second Round — Defeated Ludovik Plachetka (Czech Republic), 4-4
- Quarterfinals — Lost to Rhoshii Wells (United States), 8-8, judges cards

Men's Light-Heavyweight (– 81 kg)

- Timur Ibragimov

- First Round — Defeated Rostyslav Zaulychnyi (Ukraine), 7-3
- Second Round — Lost to Stipe Drvis (Croatia), 9-10

Men's Heavyweight (– 91 kg)

- Ruslan Chagaev

- First Round — Lost to Luan Krasniqi (Germany), 4-12

== Fencing ==
One male fencer represented Uzbekistan in 1996.

Men's foil

- Rafkat Ruziyev

== Swimming ==
Men's 50m Freestyle

- Ravil Nachaev

- Heat – 23.93 (→ did not advance, 45th place)

Men's 200m Freestyle

- Vyacheslav Kabanov

- Heat – 1:53.36 (→ did not advance, 28th place)

Men's 100m Butterfly

- Ravil Nachaev

- Heat – 56.61 (→ did not advance, 48th place)

Men's 200m Butterfly

- Dimitri Pankov

- Heat – 2:05.36 (→ did not advance, 38th place)

Men's 200m Individual Medley

- Oleg Pukhnatiy

- Heat – 2:06.39 (→ did not advance, 24th place)

Men's 4 × 100 m Freestyle Relay

- Ravil Nachaev, Oleg Tsvetkovskiy, Oleg Pukhnatiy, and Vyacheslav Kabanov

- Heat – 3:28.33 (→ did not advance, 17th place)

Men's 4 × 200 m Freestyle Relay

- Vyacheslav Kabanov, Aleksandr Agafonov, Dmitriy Pankov, and Oleg Tsvetkovskiy

- Heat – 7:40.60 (→ did not advance, 12th place)

== Tennis ==
Men's Singles Competition:

- Dmitri Tomashevich

- First round — Lost to Karol Kučera (Slovakia) 3-6, 6-2, 0-6

- Oleg Ogorodov

- First round — Defeated Sándor Noszály (Hungary) 7-5, 7-6
- Second round — Lost to MaliVai Washington (United States) 3-6, 4-6
