= Turkey at the 1996 Summer Olympics =

- IOC code: TUR
- NOC: Turkish National Olympic Committee
- Website: olimpiyat.org.tr (in English and Turkish)

in Atlanta, Georgia
- Competitors: 53
- Flag bearer: Derya Büyükuncu
- Medals Ranked 19th: Gold 4 Silver 1 Bronze 1 Total 6

Summer Olympics appearances (overview)
- 1908; 1912; 1920; 1924; 1928; 1932; 1936; 1948; 1952; 1956; 1960; 1964; 1968; 1972; 1976; 1980; 1984; 1988; 1992; 1996; 2000; 2004; 2008; 2012; 2016; 2020; 2024

Other related appearances
- 1906 Intercalated Games

Turkey competed at the 1996 Summer Olympics in Atlanta.

== Medalists ==
Medal	Name	Sport	Event
Gold	Halil Mutlu	Weightlifting	Men's Flyweight (54 kg)
Gold	Naim Süleymanoğlu	Weightlifting	Men's Featherweight (64 kg)
Gold	Hamza Yerlikaya	Wrestling	Men's Greco-Roman Middleweight (82 kg)
Gold	Mahmut Demir	Wrestling	Men's Freestyle Super Heavyweight (> 100 kg)
Silver	Malik Beyleroglu	Boxing	Men's Middleweight
Bronze	Akif Pirim	Wrestling	Men's Greco-Roman Featherweight (62 kg)

== Results by event ==
=== Archery ===
In its fourth Olympic archery competition, Turkey's women nearly earned two medals. Elif Altınkaynak made it to the semifinals in the individual competition, and the women's team made it there in the team round. However, the semifinals were as far as any Turkish archer got, and Altankaynak and the team both lost there and in the bronze medal matches.

Women's Individual Competition:

- Elif Altınkaynak → Bronze Medal Match, 4th place (4-2)
- Natalia Nasaridze → Round of 32, 21st place (1-1)
- Elif Ekşi → Round of 64, 47th place (0-1)

Men's Individual Competition:

- Okyay Küçükkayalar → Round of 64, 59th place (0-1)

Women's Team Competition:

- Altınkaynak, Nasaridze, and Ekşi → Bronze Medal Match, 4th place (2-1)

=== Athletics ===
Men's Decathlon

- Alper Kasapoğlu

- Final Result — 7575 points (→ 29th place)

Women's Javelin Throw

- Aysel Taş

- Qualification — 57.86m (→ did not advance)

Women's Marathon

- Serap Aktaş — 2:36.14 (→ 23rd place)

=== Boxing ===
Men's Light Flyweight (– 48 kg)

- Yaşar Giritli
  1. First Round — Lost to Somrot Kamsing (Thailand) on points (4-19)

Men's Bantamweight (– 54 kg)

- Soner Karagöz
  1. First Round — Lost to István Kovács (Hungary), 3-15

Men's Featherweight (– 57 kg)

- Serdar Yağlı
  1. First Round — Lost to Josian Lebon (Mauritius), 8-9

Men's Lightweight (– 60 kg)

- Vahdettin İşsever
  1. First Round — Lost to Hocine Soltani (Algeria), 2-14

Men's Light Welterweight (– 63.5 kg)

- Nurhan Süleymanoğlu
  1. First Round — Defeated Aboubacar Diallo (Guinea), 21-5
  2. Second Round — Lost to Héctor Vinent (Cuba), 1-23

Men's Welterweight (– 67 kg)

- Cahit Süme
  1. First Round — Lost to Oleg Saitov (Russia), 1-11

Men's Middleweight (– 75 kg)

- Malik Beyleroğlu → Silver Medal
  1. First Round — Bye
  2. Second Round — Defeated Zsolt Erdel (Hungary), 9-8
  3. Quarterfinals — Defeated Tomasz Borowski (Poland), 16-12
  4. Semifinals — Defeated Mohamed Bahari (Algeria), 11-11 (referee decision)
  5. Final — Lost to Ariel Hernández (Cuba), 3-11

Men's Light Heavyweight (– 81 kg)

- Yusuf Öztürk
  1. First Round — Lost to Pedro Aurino (Italy), 7-15

=== Swimming ===
Men's 400m Freestyle

- Can Ergenekan
  1. Heat — 4:02.39 (→ did not advance, 27th place)

Men's 100m Backstroke

- Derya Büyükunçu
  1. Heat — 56.71 (→ did not advance, 20th place)

Men's 200m Backstroke

- Derya Büyükuncu
  1. Heat — 2:04.28 (→ did not advance, 21st place)

Men's 100m Butterfly

- Derya Büyükuncu
  1. Heat — 54.89 (→ did not advance, 27th place)

Men's 200m Butterfly

- Can Ergenekan
  1. Heat — 2:01.65 (→ did not advance, 27th place)

Women's 100m Butterfly

- Nida Zuhal
  1. Heat — 1:04.11 (→ did not advance, 35th place)

Women's 200m Butterfly

- Nida Zuhal
  1. Heat — 2:18.46 (→ did not advance, 26th place)

=== Weightlifting ===
Men's Light-Heavyweight (– 83 kg)

- Dursun Sevinç

- Final — 165.0 + 197.5 = 362.5 (→ 7th place)

== Sources ==
- Watkins, Ginger T., ed. (1997). The Official Report of the Centennial Olympic Games, Volume III The Competition Results (PDF). Atlanta: Peachtree Publishers. ISBN 1-56145-150-9.
- "Olympic Medal Winners". International Olympic Committee.
