= Boxing at the 1996 Summer Olympics – Middleweight =

Boxing competitions

Middleweight boxing at the Games of the XXVI Olympiad
- Venue: Alexander Memorial Coliseum
- Dates: 22 July – 3 August 1996
- Competitors: 31 from 31 nations

Medalists
| 1st place, gold medalist(s) | | Ariel Hernandez | Cuba |
| 2nd place, silver medalist(s) | | Malik Beyleroglu | Turkey |
| 3rd place, bronze medalist(s) | | Mohamed Bahari | Algeria |
| 3rd place, bronze medalist(s) | | Rhoshii Wells | United States |

The Middleweight class in the boxing at the 1996 Summer Olympics competition was the fourth-heaviest class at the 1996 Summer Olympics in Atlanta, Georgia. The weight class was open for boxers weighing more than 75 kilograms. The competition in the Alexander Memorial Coliseum started on 1996-07-20 and ended on 1996-08-04.

== Medalists ==
| Gold | Ariel Hernandez; Cuba |
| Silver | Malik Beyleroglu; Turkey |
| Bronze | Mohamed Bahari; Algeria |
| Bronze | Rhoshii Wells; United States |

== Results ==
Round of 32
Zsolt Erdei (HUN) | RSC-3
Juan Pablo López (MEX) | 1:38
Mohamed Mosbahi (MAR) | 6
Tomasz Borowski (POL) | 9
Chen Tao (CHN) | 10
Hirokuni Moto (JPN) | 15
Ricardo Araneda (CHI) | 3
Akaki Kakauridze (GEO) | 10
Marcus Thomas (BAR) | 2:20
Mohamed Bahari (ALG) | RSCH-2
Randall Thompson (CAN) | 5
Brian Magee (IRL) | 11
Bertrand Tietsia (CMR) | 12
Mun Im-cheol (KOR) | 2
Bob Gasio (SAM) | 4
José Ricardo Rodrigues (BRA) | 11
Kourosh Molaei (IRI) | 7
Rhoshii Wells (USA) | 24
Brian Johansen (DEN) | 2:47
Dilshood Yarbekov (UZB) | RSCI-3
Ľudovít Plachetka (CZE) | 20
Dan Mathunjawa (SWZ) | 4
Kabary Salem (EGY) | 2
Ariel Hernandez (CUB) | 11
Sven Ottke (GER) | 11
Jean-Paul Mendy (FRA) | 4
Alexander Lebziak (RUS) | 20
Rowan Donaldson (JAM) | 4
Sackey Shibute (NAM) | 3
Justann Crawford (AUS) | 12

Round of 16
Malik Beyleroglu (TUR) | 9
Zsolt Erdei (HUN) | 8
Tomasz Borowski (POL) | 11
Hirokuni Moto (JPN) | 6
Akaki Kakauridze (GEO) | 5
Mohamed Bahari (ALG) | 8
Brian Magee (IRL) | 11
Betrand Tetsia (CMR) | 6
Ricardo Rodriguez (BRA) | 2
Rhoshii Wells (USA) | 16
Dilshood Yarbekov (UZB) | TB
Lukovik Plachetka (CZE) | 4:4
Ariel Hernandez (CUB) | 5
Sven Ottke (GER) | 0
Alexander Lebziak (RUS) | RSCH-3
Justann Crawford (AUS) | 0:34

Quarterfinals
Malik Beyleroglu (TUR) | 16
Tomasz Borowski (POL) | 12
Mohamed Bahari (ALG) | 15
Brian Magee (IRL) | 9
Rhoshii Wells (USA) | TB
Dilshood Yarbekov (UZB) | 8:8
Ariel Hernandez (CUB) | 15
Alexander Lebziak (RUS) | 8

Semifinals
Malik Beyleroglu (TUR) | TB
Mohamed Bahari (ALG) | 11:11
Rhoshii Wells (USA) | 8
Ariel Hernandez (CUB) | 17

Final
Malik Beyleroglu (TUR) | 3
Ariel Hernandez (CUB) | 11
