= Hirokuni =

- Gender: Male

Origin
- Origin: Japanese
- Meaning: Different meanings depending on the kanji used

Hirokuni (written: 裕邦 or 博国) is a masculine Japanese given name. Notable people with the name include:

- Hirokuni Moto (本 博国; born 1970), Japanese boxer
- Oiteyama Hirokuni (追風山 裕邦; 1938–2014), Japanese sumo wrestler
