= Woldemichael =

Woldemichael is a male given name of Ethiopian and Eritrean origin. Examples include:

- Woldemichael Abraha, Eritrean politician and Minister of Transport
- Woldemichael Ghebremariam, Eritrean politician and Minister of Land, Water, and Environment
- Woldemichael Solomon (1820–1906), Ras (Prince) of the Medri Bahri kingdom and Hamasien
- Yared Woldemichael (born 1968), Ethiopian boxer

== See also ==
- Woldemariam
- Wolde (disambiguation)
