= Alfredo Duvergel =

Cuban boxer (born 1968)

Personal information
- Full name: Alfredo Duvergel Adams
- Nationality: Cuba
- Born: April 2, 1968 (age 58) Guantánamo
- Height: 1.65 m (5 ft 5 in)
- Weight: 71 kg (157 lb)

Sport
- Sport: Boxing
- Weight class: Light Middleweight
Medal record
Olympic Games
Silver medal – second place	1996 Atlanta	Light Middleweight
World Amateur Championships
Gold medal – first place	1997 Budapest	Light Middleweight
Silver medal – second place	1993 Tampere	Light Middleweight
Silver medal – second place	1995 Berlin	Light Middleweight
Pan American Games
Gold medal – first place	1995 Mar del Plata	Light Middleweight
Central American and Caribbean Games
Gold medal – first place	1990 Mexico City	Light Middleweight

Alfredo Duvergel (born April 2, 1968) is a Cuban boxer. He won the silver medal in the men's light middleweight (– 71 kg) category at the 1996 Summer Olympics in Atlanta.

== Career ==
He lost the World championship finals against Romanian Francisc Vastag and had to settle for silver medals in 1995 and 1993.

At the Pan American Games in Mar del Plata, he captured the gold medal in his division.

1996 Summer Olympics

- Defeated Jozef Gilewski (Poland) 10–2
- Defeated Serhiy Horodnichov (Ukraine) 15–2
- Defeated Antonio Perugino (Italy) 15–8
- Defeated Yermakhan Ibraimov (Kazakhstan) 28–19
- Lost to David Reid (United States) KO by 3 (0:36)

He finally won the World Amateur Boxing Championships in 1997, after Vastag had ended his career.
