= Roger Pettersson =

Roger Pettersson may refer to:

- Roger Pettersson (boxer)
- Roger Pettersson (tennis)

== See also ==
- Roger Peterson (disambiguation)
