= Oscar De La Hoya vs. Derrell Coley =

Boxing match

The Return of the Golden Boy
- Date: February 26, 2000
- Venue: Madison Square Garden, New York, New York, U.S.
- Title(s) on the line: IBA welterweight title / WBC welterweight title eliminator

Tale of the tape
| Boxer | Oscar De La Hoya | Derrell Coley |
| Nickname | The Golden Boy | Too Sweet |
| Hometown | East Los Angeles, California, U.S. | Washington, D.C., U.S. |
| Purse | $4,000,000 | $1,000,000 |
| Pre-fight record | 31–1 (25 KO) | 34–1–2 (24 KO) |
| Age | 27 years | 29 years, 9 months |
| Height | 5 ft 11 in (180 cm) | 5 ft 11 in (180 cm) |
| Weight | 147 lb (67 kg) | 147 lb (67 kg) |
| Style | Orthodox | Orthodox |
| Recognition | WBC/WBA; No. 1 Ranked Welterweight; The Ring; No. 2 Ranked Welterweight; The Ring No. 4 ranked pound-for-pound fighter 4-division world champion | WBC; No. 2 Ranked Welterweight |

Result
- De La Hoya wins via 7th-round knockout

Oscar De La Hoya vs. Derrell Coley, billed as The Return of the Golden Boy, was a professional boxing match contested on February 26, 2000, for the IBA welterweight title. The fight was also WBC welterweight title "eliminator" with the winner becoming the number-one contender for the title.

== Background ==
In his previous fight, former WBC welterweight champion Oscar De La Hoya had suffered his first professional loss to IBF champion Félix Trinidad on September 19, 1999, by a close majority decision. Given the close result of their fight, De La Hoya and Trinidad engaged in talks about a rematch, but could not agree to terms as Trinidad and his promoter Don King insisted on Trinidad making more money and preferred to stage the fight one weight class higher in the super welterweight division, which De La Hoya did not immediately agree to. Rather than continue to negotiate with De La Hoya, Trinidad and King instead signed on to face David Reid for Reid's WBA super welterweight title the following March. Forced to pivot, De La Hoya announced in December 1999 that he would return to the ring in February 2000 at Madison Square Garden. Though no opponent was named at the time, the two most likely opponent were though to be either Derrell Coley, who had been WBC's number-one ranked welterweight contender or Akhmed Kotiev, the WBO welterweight champion. Just a week later, it was announced that Coley would be De La Hoya's next opponent, having agreed to a $1,000,000 deal with De La Hoya's promoter Bob Arum. There was some minor controversy as Coley's promoter Dan Goossen claimed that Arum had made the deal without involving him in the negotiations, leading to Goossen to file a lawsuit against Arum and HBO in an attempt to stop the fight, though Goossen and Arum did eventually come to terms. Cooley, as the WBC's number-one ranked welterweight contender and thus Trinidad's mandatory challenger, had originally sought to face Trinidad, briefly leading to the Trinidad–Reid fight being postponed as Trinidad did not want to relinquish his welterweight title while Coley refused to accept Trinidad's offer of $250,000 to step aside and let him first pursue the Reid fight. However, Coley dropped his protest after agreeing to face De La Hoya, paving the way for the Trinidad–Reid fight.

The fight was officially for the lightly regarded IBA welterweight title and was classified as an "eliminator" bout with the winner to become next-in-line for a shot at the WBC welterweight title then still held by Trinidad. However, as Trinidad had already decided to not return to the welterweight division following his fight against Reid and thus vacate his welterweight titles, the winner of the De La Hoya–Coley fight would become the WBC welterweight champion. Coley entered the fight as a 14–1 underdog.

After employing the legendary Gil Clancy as a co-trainer alongside his main trainer Robert Alcazar for the six fights prior to facing Coley, De La Hoya decided to drop Clancy from his team, leaving the head training duties to Alcazar solely, with De La Hoya's brother Joel Jr. and cutman Chuck Bodak assisting. Clancy reportedly had advised De La Hoya to stay away from Trinidad during the later rounds of their fight, erroneously assuming that De La Hoya had built up a big enough lead and did not need to win the last four round, effectively costing De La Hoya the victory. De La Hoya, however, explained that he had made the decision based on their being "too much confusion" between Clancy, Alcazar and his other cornermen between rounds.

== The Fight ==
De La Hoya controlled the fight from the start. Coley started the fight off tentatively and had trouble landing punches throughout as De La Hoya landed both combinations and punches to Coley's body. Coley was able to stagger De La Hoya in the fourth round with a straight right, but De La Hoya rebounded with a left uppercut that wobbled Coley and then landed an unanswered barrage though Coley survived the round. With 15 seconds left in the seventh round, De La Hoya landed a big left hand to Coley's body that sent him down on his knees. Coley made little effort to answer the referee's 10-count and was counted out as the round ended, giving De La Hoya the victory by knockout.

== Fight card ==
Confirmed bouts:

| Weight Class | Weight | | vs. | | Method | Round | Notes |
|---|---|---|---|---|---|---|---|
| Welterweight | 147 lbs. | Oscar De La Hoya | def. | Derrell Coley | KO | 7/12 | ^{Note 1} |
| Welterweight | 147 lbs. | Arturo Gatti | def. | Joey Gamache | KO | 2/10 |
| Middleweight | 160 lbs. | Tony Marshall | def. | Ray Domenge | UD | 10/10 |
| Heavyweight | 200+ lbs. | Lamon Brewster | def. | Richard Mason | UD | 10/10 |
| Super Featherweight | 130 lbs. | Mia St. John | def. | Kristin Allen | MD | 4/4 |

^Note 1 For IBA Welterweight title

== Broadcasting ==
| Country | Broadcaster |
|---|---|
| Australia | Main Event |
| United States | HBO |

| Preceded by vs. Félix Trinidad | Oscar De La Hoya's bouts 26 February 2000 | Succeeded by vs. Shane Mosley |
| Preceded by vs. Ivan Ledon | Derrell Coley's bouts 26 February 2000 | Succeeded by vs. Otilio Villarreal |
