= Aryee =

Aryee is a surname. Notable people with the surname include:

- Ashiakwei Aryee (born 1976), Ghanaian boxer
- Bernard Aryee (born 1973), Ghanaian footballer
- Fred Aryee (born 1939), Nigerian footballer
- Isaac Aryee (born 1941), Ghanaian politician
- Joyce Aryee (born 1947), Ghanaian politician
