= Norway at the 1996 Summer Olympics =

- IOC code: NOR
- NOC: Norwegian Olympic Committee and Confederation of Sports
- Website: www.idrett.no (in Norwegian)

in Atlanta
- Competitors: 98 (48 men, 55 women) in 16 sports
- Flag bearer: Linda Andersen (sailing)
- Medals Ranked 30th: Gold 2 Silver 2 Bronze 3 Total 7

Summer Olympics appearances (overview)
- 1900; 1904; 1908; 1912; 1920; 1924; 1928; 1932; 1936; 1948; 1952; 1956; 1960; 1964; 1968; 1972; 1976; 1980; 1984; 1988; 1992; 1996; 2000; 2004; 2008; 2012; 2016; 2020; 2024

Other related appearances
- 1906 Intercalated Games

Norway was represented at the 1996 Summer Olympics in Atlanta, United States, by the Norwegian Olympic Committee and Confederation of Sports.

== Medalists ==
=== Gold ===
- Vebjørn Rodal — Athletics, Men's 800 m
- Knut Holmann — Canoeing, Men's K1 1,000 m Kayak Singles

=== Silver ===
- Knut Holmann — Canoeing, Men's K1 500 m Kayak Singles
- Steffen Størseth and Kjetil Undset — Rowing, Men's Double Sculls

=== Bronze ===
- Trine Hattestad — Athletics, Women's Javelin Throw
- Peer Moberg — Sailing, Men's Laser Individual Competition
- Reidun Seth, Tina Svensson, Trine Tangeraas, Marianne Pettersen, Hege Riise, Brit Sandaune, Merete Myklebust, Bente Nordby, Nina Nymark Andersen, Tone Gunn Frustol, Tone Haugen, Linda Medalen, Ann-Kristin Aarønes, Agnete Carlsen, and Gro Espeseth — Football (soccer), Women's Team Competition

== Results by event ==
=== Archery ===
In the fifth appearance by the nation in the archery competition at the Olympics, Norway represented by one man and one woman. Their combined record was 3–2.

Women's Individual Competition:

- Wenche-Lin Hess → Round of 32 - 17th place (1-1)

Men's Individual Competition:

- Bertil Martinus Grov → Round of 16, 14th place (2-1)

=== Athletics ===
Men's 200 metres

- Geir Moen

- Heat – 20.78 s (→ advanced to the quarter-final)
- Quarter final – 20.48 s (→ advanced to the semi-final)
- Semi final – 20.96 s (→ did not advance)

Men's 800 metres

- Atle Douglas

- Heat – 1:48.60 min (→ did not advance)

- Vebjørn Rodal

- Heat – 1:45.30 min (→ advanced to the semi-final)
- Semi final – 1:43.96 min (→ advanced to the final)
- Final – 1:42.58 min (→ Gold medal)

Men's 3000 metres steeplechase

- Jim Svenøy

- Heat – 8:31.30 min (→ advanced to the semi-final)
- Semi final – 8:19.79 min (→ advanced to the final)
- Final – 8:23.39 min (→ 8th place)

Women's Marathon

- Anita Håkenstad — 2:43.58 hrs (→ 48th place)

Women's 100 metres hurdles

- Lena Solli

- Heat – 13.13 s (→ advanced to the quarter-final)
- Quarter final – 13.30 s (→ did not advance)

Men's High Jump

- Steinar Hoen

- Qualification — 2.28 m (→ advanced to the final)
- Final — 2.32 m (→ 5th place)

Women's High Jump

- Hanne Haugland

- Qualification — 1.93 m (→ advanced to the final)
- Final — 1.96 m (→ 8th place)

Men's Triple Jump

- Sigurd Njerve

- Qualification — 16.15 m (→ did not advance)

Men's Discus Throw

- Svein Inge Valvik

- Qualification — 59.60 m (→ did not advance)

Women's Discus Throw

- Mette Bergmann

- Qualification — 62.24 m (→ advanced to the final)
- Final — 62.28 m (→ 9th place)

Men's Javelin Throw

- Pål Arne Fagernes

- Qualification — 79.78 m (→ did not advance)

Women's Javelin Throw

- Trine Hattestad

- Qualification — 64.52 m (→ advanced to the final)
- Final — 64.98 m (→ Bronze medal)

=== Boxing ===
Men's Light Middleweight (71 kg)

- Jørn Johnson
  1. First Round — Defeated Sean Black (Jamaica), 13-7
  2. Second Round — Lost to Mohamed Marmouri (Tunisia), 4-17

=== Cycling ===
==== Road Competition ====
Women's Individual Road Race

- Ragnhild Kostoll

- Final — 02:37:06 (→ 18th place)

- Ingunn Bollerud

- Final — did not finish (→ no ranking)

Women's Individual Time Trial

- May Britt Hartwell

- Final — did not start (→ no ranking)

==== Mountain Bike ====
Men's Cross Country

- Rune Høydahl

- Final — 2:28:16 (→ 11th place)

Women's Cross Country

- Gunn-Rita Dahle

- Final — 1:53.50 (→ 4th place)

=== Football ===
Women's tournament

21 July 1996 Match 1	Norway	2–2	Brazil	Washington, D.C.
15:00 UTC−4	Medalen 32'; Aarønes 68'	Report	Pretinha 57', 89'	Stadium: Robert F. Kennedy Memorial Stadium; Attendance: 45,946; Referee: José María García-Aranda (Spain)

23 July 1996 Match 2	Norway	3–2	Germany	Washington, D.C.
18:30 UTC−4	Aarønes 5'; Medalen 34'; Riise 65'	Report	Wiegmann 32'; Prinz 62'	Stadium: Robert F. Kennedy Memorial Stadium; Attendance: 28,000; Referee: Eddie Lennie (Australia)

25 July 1996 Match 3	Norway	4–0	Japan	Washington, D.C.
18:30 UTC−4	Pettersen 25', 86'; Medalen 60'; Tangeraas 74'	Report		Stadium: Robert F. Kennedy Memorial Stadium; Attendance: 30,237; Referee: Omer Al Mehannah (Saudi Arabia)

28 July 1996 Semifinals	Norway	1–2 (a.e.t.)	United States	Athens
17:30 UTC−4	Medalen 18'	Report	Akers 76' (pen.); MacMillan 100'	Stadium: Sanford Stadium; Attendance: 64,196; Referee: Sonia Denoncourt (Canada)

1 August 1996 Bronze Medal Match	Brazil	0–2	Norway	Athens
18:00 UTC−4		Report	Aarønes 21', 25'	Stadium: Sanford Stadium; Attendance: 76,489; Referee: Ingrid Jonsson (Sweden)

=== Swimming ===
Men's 100 m Breaststroke

- Borge Mørk
  1. Heat — 1:04.92 (→ did not advance, 31st place)

Men's 200 m Breaststroke

- Borge Mørk
  1. Heat — 2:20.42 (→ did not advance, 25th place)

Women's 50 m Freestyle

- Vibeke Johansen
  1. Heat — 26.22 (→ did not advance, 17th place)

Women's 100 m Freestyle

- Vibeke Johansen
  1. Heat — 56.88 (→ did not advance, 18th place)

Women's 400 m Freestyle

- Irene Dalby
  1. Heat — 4:19.34 (→ did not advance, 18th place)

Women's 800 m Freestyle

- Irene Dalby
  1. Heat — 8:37.73
  2. Final — 8:38.34 (→ 5th place)

Women's 100 m Breaststroke

- Elin Austevoll
  1. Heat — 1:09.96
  2. B-final — 1:10.27 (→ 12th place)
- Terrie Miller
  1. Heat — 1:11.09 (→ did not advance, 20th place)

Women's 200 m Breaststroke

- Elin Austevoll
  1. Heat — 2:32.48 (→ did not advance, 19th place)

Women's 200 m Individual Medley

- Elin Austevoll
  1. Heat — 2:19.81 (→ did not advance, 24th place)

=== Volleyball ===
==== Men's Beach Competition ====
- Jan Kvalheim and Björn Maaseide — 7th place overall
