= José Quiñones =

José Quiñones may refer to:

- José Luis Quiñones (born 1974), Puerto Rican boxer
- José Severo Quiñones (1838–1909), Puerto Rico judge
- José Quiñones Gonzales (1914–1941), Peruvian military aviator
