= Wolde (disambiguation) =

Wolde is a municipality in the district of Demmin, in Mecklenburg-Vorpommern, Germany.

Wolde may also refer to:

== People ==
People with name Wolde (meaning "Child of" in Geʽez):

- Abba Samuel Wolde Kahin (died 1915), Ethiopian academic
- Dawit Wolde (born 1991), Ethiopian middle-distance runner
- Demissie Wolde (born 1937), Ethiopian former marathon runner
- Ellen van Wolde (born 1954)
- Goshu Wolde (born 1942)
- Gunilla Wolde (1939–2015), Swedish writer and illustrator
- Mamo Wolde (1932–2002), Ethiopian long distance track and road running athlete
- Million Wolde (born 1979), Ethiopian long-distance runner
- Wolde Giyorgis Wolde Yohannes (1901–1976), Ethiopian politician
- Wolde Harris (born 1974), Jamaican soccer striker
- Wolde Selassie (died 1816), Ras of Ethiopia and warlord of Tigray
- Yared Wolde (born 1968), Ethiopian boxer

== See also ==
- De Wolde
- Wolde-Giorgis
- Wolde Giyorgis
- Woldemichael
- Woldemariam
