= Tulaganov =

Tulaganov is a surname. Notable people with the surname include:

- Karim Tulaganov (born 1973), Uzbek boxer
- Rustam Tulaganov (born 1991), Uzbek boxer
