= David Reid (boxer) =

American boxer

Personal information
- Nickname: The American Dream
- Born: David Terrell Reid; September 17, 1973 (age 52) Philadelphia, Pennsylvania, U.S.
- Height: 5 ft 9 in (175 cm)
- Weight: Light middleweight

Boxing career
- Reach: 70 in (178 cm)
- Stance: Orthodox

Boxing record
- Total fights: 19
- Wins: 17
- Win by KO: 7
- Losses: 2
Medal record
Men's Boxing
Representing United States
Olympic Games
Gold medal – first place	1996 Atlanta	Light Middleweight
Pan American Games
Gold medal – first place	1995 Mar del Plata	Welterweight

David Terrell Reid (born September 17, 1973) is a former boxer from Philadelphia, Pennsylvania.

== Amateur career ==
Reid had a stellar amateur boxing career, culminating with a come-from-behind, one-punch knock out win to secure a gold medal at the 1996 summer Olympics in Atlanta, Georgia. This followed Reid's title victory a year earlier at the 1995 Pan American Games in Mar del Plata. Because he was, like Oscar De La Hoya four years before, the only Olympic gold medalist in boxing for the United States, comparisons by writers and critics to de la Hoya were practically inevitable. De la Hoya's nickname is "The Golden Boy"; Reid was dubbed as "The American Dream".

=== Amateur highlights ===
- 1993 National Golden Gloves Welterweight champion
- 1994 United States Amateur Welterweight champion
- 1996 United States Amateur Light middleweight champion
- Won the Light Middleweight gold medal for the United States at the 1996 Olympics in Atlanta, United States. His results were:
- Defeated Wan-Kyun Lee (South Korea) 20-4
- Defeated Pavol Polakovič (Czech Republic) 12-5
- Defeated Mohamed Marmouri (Tunisia) 13-8
- Defeated Karim Tulaganov (Uzbekistan) 12-4
- Defeated Alfredo Duvergel (Cuba) KO 3 (0:36)

== Pro career ==
Reid began his professional career, with much attention from boxing magazines, when he defeated Sam Calderon on March 21, 1997, by a unanimous four round decision, in Atlantic City, New Jersey.

He followed his debut victory with four knockout wins in a row, before meeting former world welterweight champion Jorge Vaca, on October 3 of the same year, also at Atlantic City. He knocked Vaca out in the first round.

His next bout, against Dan Conolly, was showcased on HBO Boxing, and it was also covered, round by round, by The Ring. Reid earned his sixth victory in a row, knocking out Conolly (who was described by The Ring magazine as a "game opponent") in five rounds.

On January 31, 1998, he dropped Robert Frazier in the first round. Despite losing a point in round six due to what the referee thought was dirty tactics, Reid went on to beat Frazier by an eight round unanimous decision.

After two more wins, he faced former world champion Simon Brown, knocking him out in four rounds on June 27, at Reid's hometown. On October 24, he claimed his first belt, defeating James Cocker by a twelve round unanimous decision, to win the WBC's Continental Americas light middleweight title.

=== WBA light middleweight champion ===
After that victory, he was deemed as ready for a world title try by his management team, and so, on March 6, 1999, Reid became a world champion in only his tenth professional bout (making him one of the boxers to win a world title in the fastest time, also like the second Davey Moore), by beating WBA light middleweight champion Laurent Boudouani by a twelve round unanimous decision in Atlantic City.

Reid would defend his title successfully twice, one of them, a twelve round unanimous decision over Keith Mullings in Las Vegas.

By then, Reid had already made Las Vegas his new home. There was much talk about facing him against a number of opponents, including Roy Jones Jr., Bernard Hopkins, De La Hoya and Félix Trinidad.

=== Trinidad vs Reid Bout ===
The only fight out of those four possible match-ups came on March 3, 2000, when he defended his crown against Trinidad in Las Vegas. Reid enjoyed some advantage during the first six rounds, having dropped Trinidad in the third, and with the fight being close on all three judges' scorecards. He was dropped in round seven, however, and subsequently suffered a detached retina and three more knockdowns in round eleven, before losing the world title by a twelve round unanimous decision.

Many fans then questioned his management's judgment by letting Reid defend his title against a veteran like Trinidad in only his fifteenth professional bout, a fact that reminded many of the case of the second Davey Moore 17 years before, when he defended the same WBA title, in only his thirteenth bout, against the far more experienced, boxing hall of famer Roberto Durán. Many critics say that the reason for Reid's falldown after his defeat to Trinidad could be due to a psychological break-down, but the fact is that his detached retina affected him for the rest of his short career.

== Professional boxing record ==
19 fights	17 wins	2 losses
By knockout	7	1
By decision	10	1

No.	Result	Record	Opponent	Type	Round, time	Date	Location	Notes
19	Loss	17–2	Sam Hill	TKO	9 (10)	2001-11-11	Belterra Casino Resort, Elizabeth, Indiana, U.S.	
18	Win	17–1	Maurice Brantley	UD	10 (10)	2001-07-08	Texas Station, North Las Vegas, Nevada, U.S.	
17	Win	16–1	Urbano Gurrola	UD	10 (10)	2001-04-01	The Joint, Paradise, Nevada, U.S.	
16	Win	15–1	Quirino Garcia	UD	10 (10)	2000-11-26	Regent Hotel & Casino, Summerlin, Nevada, U.S.	
15	Loss	14–1	Félix Trinidad	UD	12 (12)	2000-03-03	Caesars Palace, Paradise, Nevada, U.S.	Lost WBA light middleweight title
14	Win	14–0	Keith Mullings	UD	12 (12)	1999-08-28	The Joint, Paradise, Nevada, U.S.	Retained WBA light middleweight title
13	Win	13–0	Kevin Kelly	UD	12 (12)	1999-07-16	Convention Center, Atlantic City, New Jersey, U.S.	Retained WBA light middleweight title
12	Win	12–0	Laurent Boudouani	UD	12 (12)	1999-03-06	Convention Center, Atlantic City, New Jersey, U.S.	Won WBA light middleweight title
11	Win	11–0	James Coker	UD	12 (12)	1998-10-24	Taj Majal Hotel & Casino, Atlantic City, New Jersey, U.S.	Won Continental Americas WBC light middleweight title
10	Win	10–0	Simon Brown	KO	4 (10)	1998-06-27	Apollo Theater, Philadelphia, Pennsylvania, U.S.	
9	Win	9–0	Nick Rupa	TKO	2 (10)	1998-05-09	Taj Majal Hotel & Casino, Atlantic City, New Jersey, U.S.	
8	Win	8–0	Fidel Avendano	UD	8 (8)	1998-03-03	Coliseum, Corpus Christi, Texas, U.S.	
7	Win	7–0	Robert Frazier	UD	8 (8)	1998-01-31	Taj Majal Hotel & Casino, Atlantic City, New Jersey, U.S.	
6	Win	6–0	Dan Connolly	TKO	5 (8)	1997-11-22	Taj Majal Hotel & Casino, Atlantic City, New Jersey, U.S.	
5	Win	5–0	Jorge Vaca	KO	1 (8)	1997-10-03	Tropicana Hotel & Casino, Atlantic City, New Jersey, U.S.	
4	Win	4–0	Geoff Yalenezian	TKO	2 (8)	1997-09-23	Foxwoods Resort Casino, Ledyard, Connecticut, U.S.	
3	Win	3–0	John Long	TKO	2 (6)	1997-06-21	War Memorial Auditorium, Syracuse, New York, U.S.	
2	Win	2–0	Robert Koon	TKO	6 (6)	1997-05-24	Mammoth Events Center, Denver, Colorado, U.S.	
1	Win	1–0	Sam Calderon	UD	4 (4)	1997-03-21	Taj Majal Hotel & Casino, Atlantic City, New Jersey, U.S.	

== Retirement ==
He returned to the boxing ring for four bouts. He won three fights against insignificant opposition, then lost to Sam Hill by a knockout in nine rounds, in what would turn out to be his last bout, on November 11, 2001, at Elizabeth, Indiana. His retina was causing him more trouble, and he retired before losing his eyesight. Reid had first suffered an eye injury in the 1995 Olympic Trials, and after several surgeries as a professional, he continued to suffer from ptosis.

== See also ==
- List of world light-middleweight boxing champions

Sporting positions
Amateur boxing titles
Previous: Pepe Reilly	Golden Gloves welterweight champion 1993	Next: Orlando Hollis
Previous: Hector Colon	U.S. welterweight champion 1994	Next: Bobby Lewis
Previous: Jeffrey Clark	U.S. light middleweight champion 1996	Next: Darnell Wilson
World boxing titles
Preceded by Laurent Boudouani	WBA Super welterweight champion March 6, 1999 – March 3, 2000	Succeeded by Félix Trinidad
