= Plachetka =

Plachetka is a surname. Notable people with the surname include:

- Adam Plachetka (born 1985), Czech bass-baritone
- Ján Plachetka (1945–2026), Slovak chess grandmaster
- Ľudovít Plachetka (born 1971), Slovak boxer
