= Mahenge (disambiguation) =

Mahenge is a town in the Morogoro Region of Tanzania

== Places ==
- Mahenge District, alternative name for Ulanga District, Tanzania
- Mahenge Mountains, a mountain range in Tanzania

== People ==
=== Family name ===
- Binilith Mahenge (born 1862), a Tanzanian politician

=== Given name ===
- Mahenge Zulu (1965-2019), an African-born, Italian boxer

== Other uses ==
- Mahenge offensive, a military campaign in East Africa in 1917
- SS Mahenge, A Belgian cargo ship which sank in 1952
