= Woldemariam =

Woldemariam (Ge'ez: ወልደ ማርያም meaning “child of Mary”) is a male given name of Ethiopian and Eritrean origin may refer to:

- Ambaye Wolde Mariam (1906–1954, in Keren Eritrea), Ethiopian Foreign Minister in 1953
- Mesfin Woldemariam (1930–2020), Ethiopian peace activist and geographer
- Million A. Woldemariam, shooting victim
- Selam Woldemariam (born 1954), Ethiopian guitarist
- Woldeab Woldemariam (1905–1995), Eritrean politician active in the Eritrean independence movement
- Yosef Wolde-Mariam, founder of Norwegian dance/hip hop duo Madcon

== See also ==
- Wolde (disambiguation)
