= Jørn Johnson =

Norwegian boxer

Personal information
- Nationality: Norwegian
- Born: 26 November 1971 (age 53); Porsgrunn, Telemark, Norway
- Height: 188 cm (6 ft 2 in)
- Weight: 75 kg (165 lb)

Sport
- Country: Norway
- Sport: Boxing

Jørn Johnson is a Norwegian Olympic boxer. He represented his country in the light-middleweight division at the 1996 Summer Olympics. He won his first bout against Sean Black, but lost his second against Mohamed Marmouri.
