= Jorge Silva (Brazilian boxer) =

Brazilian boxer

Personal information
- Born: 19 June 1966 (age 58); Recife, Brazil

Sport
- Sport: Boxing

Jorge Silva (born 19 June 1966) is a Brazilian boxer. He competed in the men's light middleweight event at the 1996 Summer Olympics.
