= Roger Peterson =

Roger Peterson may refer to:

- Roger Tory Peterson (1908–1996), American ornithologist
- Roger Peterson (musician) (born 1980), Aruban-Dutch musician
- Roger Peterson (pilot) (1937–1959), American pilot of the plane that crashed, killing Buddy Holly, Ritchie Valens, and Jiles Perry Richardson

== See also ==
- Roger Peters (born 1944), English footballer
- Roger Pettersson (boxer) (born 1973), Swedish boxer
- Roger Pettersson (tennis) (1972), Swedish tennis player
