= Oscar De La Hoya vs. Félix Trinidad =

Boxing competition

The Fight of the Millennium
- Date: September 18, 1999
- Venue: Mandalay Bay Events Center, Paradise, Nevada, U.S.
- Title(s) on the line: WBC and IBF welterweight titles

Tale of the tape
Boxer	Oscar De La Hoya	Félix Trinidad
Nickname	"The Golden Boy"	"Tito"
Hometown	East Los Angeles, California, U.S.	Cupey Alto, San Juan, Puerto Rico
Purse	$21,000,000	$8,500,000
Pre-fight record	31–0 (25 KO)	35–0 (30 KO)
Age	26 years, 7 months	26 years, 8 months
Height	5 ft 10 1/2 in (179 cm)	5 ft 11 in (180 cm)
Weight	147 lb (67 kg)	147 lb (67 kg)
Style	Orthodox	Orthodox
Recognition	WBC; Welterweight Champion; The Ring pound-for-pound No. 1 ranked fighter 4-division world champion	IBF; Welterweight Champion; The Ring pound-for-pound No. 4 ranked fighter

Result
- Trinidad wins via 12–round majority decision (114–114, 115–114, 115–113)

Oscar De La Hoya vs. Félix Trinidad, billed as The Fight of the Millennium, was a boxing match held at the Mandalay Bay Events Center on the Las Vegas Strip on September 18, 1999, to unify the WBC and IBF welterweight championships.

After twelve tensely fought rounds, Trinidad was declared the winner by a majority decision.

== Background ==
Planned by promoters Bob Arum and Don King, it pitted WBC world champion Oscar De La Hoya, a Mexican American, Los Angeles native, versus Puerto Rican IBF world champion Félix Trinidad. It was the last of the so-called superfights of the 20th century.

== The fight ==
After twelve tensely fought rounds, Trinidad was declared the winner by a controversial majority decision.

De La Hoya and Trinidad were content to box from the outside most of the fight, with De La Hoya using his boxing skills and Trinidad looking for openings in De La Hoya's guard. De La Hoya injured one of Trinidad's eyes along the process, and he built a lead that he apparently felt, after nine rounds, secured him the win on points. In fact, at the time, he was leading, but only by 87–84 and 86–85 on two score cards while the third card was tied at 86–86.

De La Hoya boxed in circles from rounds ten to twelve, while Trinidad upped his offensive output. This became a crucial matter because while De La Hoya backpedalled, Trinidad accumulated points on the scorecards and De La Hoya was given only one round by one of the three scoring judges the rest of the way. Trinidad out-punched De la Hoya by a margin of 64 to 33 during those three remaining rounds.

Trinidad was afterwards declared winner by margins of 115–113 on one card and 115–114 on the second, the third one being a 114–114 draw, thus Trinidad winning by a 12 rounds majority decision.

== Aftermath ==
The bout set the pay-per-view record for a non-heavyweight fight with 1.4 million ($70 million) buys on HBO and $12.9 million in ticket sales, until it was broken by De La Hoya-Mayweather on May 5, 2007. It set the record 2.4 million buys, the most in boxing history until that was surpassed by Mayweather-Pacquiao in 2015 with the record of 4.6 million buys.

In 2014, both boxers were inducted into the International Boxing Hall of Fame.

== Undercard ==
Confirmed bouts:

== Broadcasting ==
Country	Broadcaster
United States	HBO
Thailand	Channel 7

== See also ==
- Errol Spence Jr. vs. Shawn Porter

Preceded by vs. Oba Carr	Oscar De La Hoya's bouts 18 September 1999	Succeeded by vs. Derrell Coley
Preceded by vs. Hugo Pineda	Félix Trinidad's bouts 18 September 1999	Succeeded by vs. David Reid
