= Vibeke Johansen =

Norwegian swimmer (born 1978)

Personal information
- Full name: Vibeke L. Johansen
- Nationality: Norwegian
- Born: July 27, 1978 (age 47)

Sport
- Sport: Swimming
- Strokes: Freestyle
- Club: Andøya SLK
Medal record
Short Course Europeans
| Bronze medal – third place | 1996 Rostock | 50m freestyle |

Vibeke L. Johansen (born 27 July 1978) is an Olympic and National Record holding swimmer from Norway. She swam for Norway at the 1996 Summer Olympics.

She competed at the European Short Course Swimming Championships 1996, where she won a bronze medal in 50 m freestyle.

She participated at the 1996 Summer Olympics, where she finished 17th in 50 m freestyle, and 18th in 100 m freestyle.
