= Juan Pablo López =

Mexican boxer (born 1972)

Personal information
- Nationality: Mexican
- Born: 10 April 1972 (age 54)

Sport
- Sport: Boxing

Juan Pablo López (born 10 April 1972) is a Mexican boxer. He competed in the men's middleweight event at the 1996 Summer Olympics.
