= Malik Beyleroğlu =

Turkish boxer (born 1970)

Medal record

Men's boxing

Representing Turkey

Olympic Games
Silver medal – second place	1996 Atlanta	Middleweight

Mediterranean Games
Silver medal – second place	1993 Languedoc-Roussillon	Light Middleweight
Bronze medal – third place	1997 Bari	Middleweight

Malik Beyleroğlu (born January 21, 1970) is a former amateur boxer from Turkey (Azerbaijani origin), born in the Azerbaijan Soviet Socialist Republic, Soviet Union. At the 1996 Summer Olympics, he won the silver medal in the men's middleweight division (71 – 75 kg). In the final, he was defeated by Ariel Hernández of Cuba.

Holding a PhD in sports, Beyleroğlu is currently a lecturer for physical education and sports at Sakarya University.

== Olympic results ==
- 1st round bye
- Defeated Zsolt Erdei (Hungary) 9-8
- Defeated Tomasz Borowski (Poland) 16-12
- Defeated Mohamed Bahari (Algeria) 11-11, referee's decision
- Lost to Ariel Hernández (Cuba) 3-11
