= Alexander Kwangwari =

Zimbabwean boxer (born 1968)

Personal information
- Nationality: Zimbabwean
- Born: 28 December 1968 (age 56)

Sport
- Sport: Boxing

Alexander Kwangwari (born 28 December 1968) is a Zimbabwean boxer. He competed in the men's light middleweight event at the 1996 Summer Olympics, and later became a boxing coach.
