= Mun Im-cheol =

Korean male boxer

Personal information
- Nationality: South Korean
- Born: 16 June 1972 (age 52)

Sport
- Sport: Boxing

Mun Im-cheol (born 16 June 1972) is a South Korean boxer. He competed in the men's middleweight event at the 1996 Summer Olympics.
