= Bertrand Tietsia =

Cameroonian boxer (born 1972)

Personal information
- Nationality: Cameroonian
- Born: 27 October 1972 (age 52)

Sport
- Sport: Boxing

Bertrand Tietsia (born 27 October 1972) is a Cameroonian boxer. He competed in the men's middleweight event at the 1996 Summer Olympics.
