= David Reid vs. Félix Trinidad =

2000 Boxing match

The Glory of Caesars: Undefeated Gladiators
- Date: March 3, 2000
- Venue: Caesars Palace, Paradise, Nevada, U.S.
- Title(s) on the line: WBA super welterweight title

Tale of the tape
Boxer	David Reid	Félix Trinidad
Nickname	The American Dream	Tito
Hometown	Philadelphia, Pennsylvania, U.S.	San Juan, Puerto Rico
Purse	$3,000,000	$4,000,000
Pre-fight record	14–0 (7 KO)	36–0 (30 KO)
Age	26 years, 5 months	27 years, 1 month
Height	5 ft 9 in (175 cm)	5 ft 11 in (180 cm)
Weight	153 lb (69 kg)	146 lb (66 kg)
Style	Orthodox	Orthodox
Recognition	WBA; Super Welterweight Champion; The Ring; No. 2 Ranked Light Middleweight	WBC and IBF; Welterweight Champion; The Ring; No. 1 Ranked Welterweight; The Ring pound-for-pound No. 4 ranked fighter

Result
- Trinidad wins via unanimous decision (114–107, 114–107, 114–106)

David Reid vs. Félix Trinidad, billed as The Glory of Caesars: Undefeated Gladiators, was a professional boxing match contested on March 3, 2000, for the WBA super welterweight title.

== Background ==
In his previous fight on September 18, 1999, Félix Trinidad had scored arguably his biggest victory by defeating the previously undefeated Oscar De La Hoya to become the unified WBC and IBF welterweight champion. After the success of that fight, talks of rematch immediately began but negotiations stalled and Trinidad's promoter Don King announced that Trinidad would instead move up to the super welterweight division to challenge reigning WBA super welterweight champion David Reid. The fight was briefly postponed when the WBC ordered that Trinidad defend his welterweight title against mandatory challenger Derrell Coley or be stripped. As Trinidad did not want to vacate his welterweight titles at the time, Coley was offered "a substantial amount" of money to step aside and allow Trinidad to pursue the Reid fight, but Coley initially refused and insisted on fighting Trinidad for the title. However, Coley would drop his protest against Trinidad and agreed to face De La Hoya in February, allowing the Trinidad–Reid to move forward. Originally set for a March 4, 2000 date, the fight was moved up a day because King's rival promoter Bob Arum had already secured that date for a pay-per-view card headlined by Paulie Ayala–Johnny Bredahl WBA bantamweight title fight.

== The Fight ==
Reid controlled most of the early portion of the fight taking the lead on all three scorecards after the first five rounds. Reid would score the fight's first knockdown in the third round sending Trinidad down after landing a right cross though Trinidad quickly got back up. Following the fifth round, however, Trinidad dominated the remainder of the fight as he scored four knockdowns on Reid and did not lose any rounds from the sixth round on, though he was penalized a point twice for low blows in the sixth and eleventh rounds. Trinidad would score his first knockdown late in the seventh round after landing a combination that sent Reid reeling into the ropes and down on his knees, though he was able to answer the referee's 10-count at seven as the round ended. Then in the eleventh, Trinidad scored three more knockdowns though Reid was able to answer the 10-count on all three and was allowed to continue the fight and managed to go the full 12-round distance. Trinidad was named the winner on all three scorecards with two scores of 114–107 and one score of 114–106.

== Fight card ==
Confirmed bouts:

Weight Class	Weight		vs.		Method	Round	Notes
Super Welterweight	154 lbs.	Félix Trinidad	def.	David Reid (c)	UD	12/12	^{Note 1}
Super Lightweight	140 lbs.	Felix Flores	def.	Miguel Angel Ruiz	TKO	7/12	^{Note 2}
Super Middleweight	168 lbs.	William Joppy	def.	Fernando Zuniga	UD	10/10
Welterweight	147 lbs.	DeMarcus Corley	def.	Sam Miller	TKO	5/10
Light Heavyweight	175 lbs.	Gary Campbell	def.	Frédéric Serrat	TKO	4/8
Super Lightweight	140 lbs.	Christy Martin	def.	Belinda Laracuente	MD	8/8
Heavyweight	200+ lbs.	Friday Ahunanya	def.	Donald Macon	TKO	1/4

^Note 1 For WBA Super Welterweight title
^Note 2 For NABA Super Lightweight title

== Broadcasting ==
Country	Broadcaster
United States	Showtime

Preceded by vs. Keith Mullings	David Reid's bouts 3 March 2000	Succeeded by vs. Quirino Garcia
Preceded by vs. Oscar De La Hoya	Félix Trinidad's bouts 3 March 2000	Succeeded by vs. Mamadou Thiam
