= Mohamed Bahari =

Algerian boxer (born 1976)

Personal information
- Full name: محمد بهاري
- Nationality: Algeria
- Born: 21 October 1975 (age 50) Sidi Bel Abbès
- Height: 1.80 m (5 ft 11 in)
- Weight: 75 kg (165 lb)

Sport
- Sport: Boxing
- Weight class: Middleweight
Medal record
Olympic Games
| Bronze medal – third place | 1996 Atlanta | Middleweight |
All-Africa Games
| Gold medal – first place | 1995 Harare | Middleweight |
| Gold medal – first place | 1999 Johannesburg | Light Heavy |

Mohamed Bahari (born June 29, 1976, in Sidi Bel Abbès, Algeria) is a boxer from Algeria.

Bahari won the bronze medal in the middleweight division (71–75 kg) at the 1996 Summer Olympics in Atlanta. US boxer Rhoshii Wells won the other bronze medal in that weight division.

== Olympic results ==
- Defeated Marcus Thomas (Barbados) RSC 2 (2:20)
- Defeated Akaki Kakauridze (Georgia) 8–5
- Defeated Brian Magee (Ireland) 15–9
- Lost to Malik Beyleroğlu (Turkey) 11-11, referee's decision

== Pro career ==
Bahari turned pro in 2003, his last fight came in 2004 and he retired with a record of 3–2–2.

== Professional boxing record ==
3 Wins (1 knockout, 2 decisions), 2 Losses (1 knockout, 1 decision), 2 Draws
| Res. | Record | Opponent | Type | Rd., Time | Date | Location | Notes |
| Loss | 3-2-2 | (Venezuela) Gusmyr Perdomo | TKO | 2 (6) | 2004-10-21 | Palais des Sports, Levallois-Perret, France | |
| Draw | 3-1-2 | (France) Victor Ansoula Mayala | PTS | 8 | 2004-06-18 | Les Pennes-Mirabeau, France | |
| Loss | 3-1-1 | (France) Frederic Mainhaguiet | PTS | 6 | 2004-02-27 | Hyères, France | |
| Win | 3-0-1 | (Algeria) Nourredine Maazouz | KO | 2 (4) | 2003-10-10 | Palais des Sports, Marseille, France | |
| Draw | 2-0-1 | (France) Christophe Karagoz | PTS | 6 | 2003-04-18 | Hyères, France | |
| Win | 2-0 | (France) Antoine Lojacono | PTS | 6 | 2003-03-08 | Palais des Sports, Marseille, France | |
| Win | 1-0 | (France) Mounir Sahli | PTS | 4 | 2003-02-22 | Marseille, France | |

== Career ==
Olympic Games

- (bronze) OlympicGames1996 (Atlanta, USA) (-75 kg)

World Amateur Boxing Championships

- Quarter-finals World Junior Championships (Istanbul, Turkey) 1994 (-75 kg)
- Preliminaries 1/16 World Amateur Boxing Championships 1995 (Berlin, Germany) (-75 kg)

CISM - World Military Championships

- (bronze) CISM Championships ( San Antonio, USA) 1997 (- 81 kg )

African Amateur Boxing Championships

- (gold) African Amateur Boxing Championships 1998 ( Algiers, Algeria ) (- 81 kg )
- (silver) African Amateur Boxing Championships ( Johannesburg, South Africa) 1994 (-75 kg)

All-Africa Games

- (gold) All-Africa Games (Harare, Zimbabwe ) 1995 (-75 kg)
- (gold) All-Africa Games ( Johannesburg, South Africa) 1999 (- 81 kg )

Pan Arab Games

- (silver) Pan Arab Games 1997 ( Beirut, Lebanon) (-75 kg)
- (silver) Pan Arab Games 1999 (Amman, Jordan) (- 81 kg )

=== International tournaments ===
- (gold) Italia Junior ( Sardinia, Italy )1994 (- 81 kg )
- (silver) President's Cup ( Jakarta, Indonesia) 1995 (-75 kg)
- Quarter-finals Strandja Memorial ( Sofia, Bulgaria) 1996 (-75 kg)
