= Stephen Hylton =

Jamaican table tennis player

Personal information
- Nationality: Jamaican
- Born: 23 October 1964 (age 60)

Sport
- Sport: Table tennis

Stephen Hylton (born 23 October 1964) is a Jamaican table tennis player. He competed in the men's singles event at the 1996 Summer Olympics.
