= Dan Mathunjawa =

Swazi boxer (born 1970)

Personal information
- Nationality: Swazi
- Born: 1 June 1970 (age 54)

Sport
- Sport: Boxing

Dan Mathunjawa (born 1 June 1970) is a Swazi boxer. He competed in the men's middleweight event at the 1996 Summer Olympics.
