= Victor Kunene =

South African boxer

Personal information
- Nationality: South African
- Born: 19 December 1966 (age 58); Newcastle, KwaZulu-Natal, South Africa

Sport
- Sport: Boxing

Victor Kunene (born 19 December 1966) is a South African boxer. He competed in the men's light middleweight event at the 1996 Summer Olympics.
