= Lee Wan-gyun =

Korean male boxer

Personal information
- Nationality: South Korean
- Born: 1 March 1974 (age 51)

Sport
- Sport: Boxing

Lee Wan-gyun (born 1 March 1974) is a South Korean boxer. He competed in the men's light middleweight event at the 1996 Summer Olympics.
