= Serhiy Horodnichov =

Ukrainian boxer

Personal information
- Full name: Сергій Городнічов
- Nationality: Ukraine
- Born: 31 January 1970 (age 56)
- Height: 1.76 m (5 ft 9 in)
- Weight: 71 kg (157 lb)

Sport
- Sport: Boxing
- Weight class: Light Middleweight

Serhiy Horodnichov (Ukrainian: Сергій Городнічов; born 31 January 1970) is a retired male boxer from Ukraine. He represented his native country at the 1996 Summer Olympics in Atlanta, Georgia, where he was stopped in the first round of the men's light-middleweight division (– 71 kg) by Cuba's eventual silver medalist Alfredo Duvergel.
