= Rhoshii Wells =

American boxer

Medal record

Men's boxing

Representing the United States

Olympic Games
Bronze medal – third place	1996 Atlanta	Middleweight

Rhoshii Wells (December 30, 1976 – August 11, 2008) was an American boxer, who won the bronze medal in the Middleweight Division at the 1996 Summer Olympics. He was born in Austin, Texas.

== Amateur career ==
Olympic results

- Defeated Kourosh Molaei (Iran) 24–7
- Defeated Ricardo Rodríguez (Brazil) 16–2
- Defeated Dilshod Yarbekov (Uzbekistan) 8–8, judges cards
- Lost to Ariel Hernández (Cuba) 8–17

== Pro career ==
Nicknamed "The Great One", Wells began his professional career in 1997, and got off to a 17-0-2 start in the Light Middleweight division, setting up a shot at WBA Light Middleweight Title holder Alejandro Garcia in 2003. He was ahead on the scorecards before Garcia stopped him in the 11th round. In 2005, Wells had the opportunity for a rematch with Garcia but was defeated via TKO in the 9th round.

He attempted a comeback on the 3rd season of the boxing reality TV series, The Contender on ESPN, but was eliminated before the competition began.

== Death ==
Rhoshii Wells was shot and killed in Las Vegas, Nevada on August 11, 2008. Police arrested 26-year-old Roger Randolph, who claimed that he shot Wells in self-defense after Wells punched him and robbed him of $100. The District Attorney stated that they would seek the death penalty against Randolph.

In May 2012, Randolph was sentenced to 20 years to life for murder with a deadly weapon, plus one to 12 years for discharging weapon where a person might be endangered.
