= José Luis Quiñones =

Puerto Rican boxer

Personal information
- Nationality: Puerto Rican
- Born: 1 March 1974 (age 51); Aguadilla, Puerto Rico

Sport
- Sport: Boxing

José Luis Quiñones (born 1 March 1974) was a Puerto Rican boxer. He competed in the men's light middleweight event at the 1996 Summer Olympics.
