= Oiteyama Hirokuni =

Japanese sumo wrestler (1938–2014)

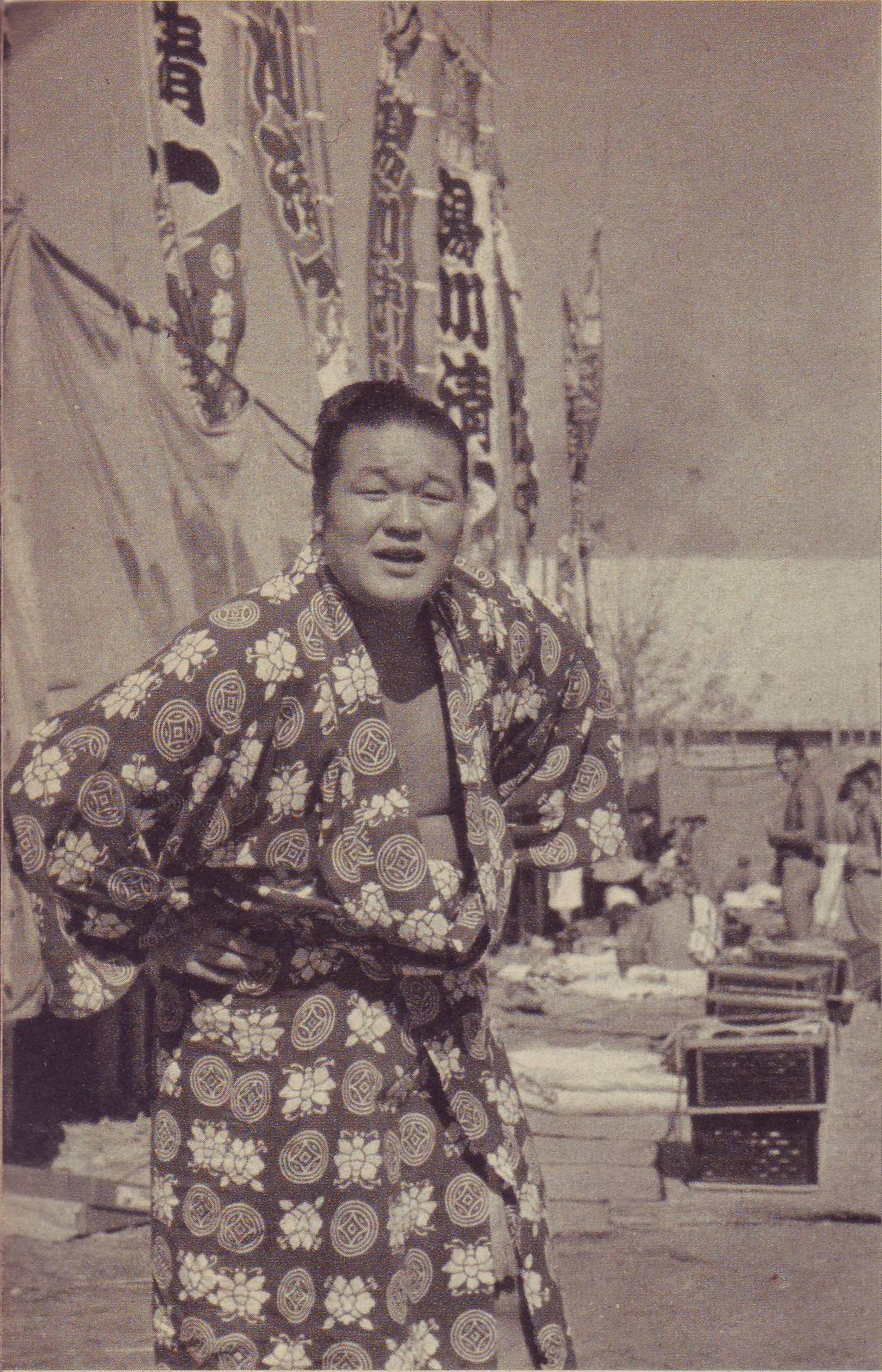

Personal information
- Native name: 追風山 裕邦
- Born: Mitsugu Yamaguchi; 16 June 1938 Goshogawara, Aomori, Japan
- Died: 2 January 2014 (aged 75)
- Height: 1.81 m (5 ft 11 1/2 in)
- Weight: 131 kg (289 lb)

Sport
- Sport: Sumo
- Retired: May, 1969
- Heya: Oitekaze → Tatsunami
- Record: 577-545-18
- Debut: May, 1953
- Highest rank: Maegashira 6 (November, 1962)
- Elder name: Nakagawa
- Championships: 1 (Jūryō)
- Updated on June 2020

Oiteyama Hirokuni, born Mitsugu Yamaguchi (16 June 1938 – 2 January 2014), was a sumo wrestler from Goshogawara, Aomori, Japan. He made his professional debut in May 1953 and reached the top division in May 1960. His highest rank was maegashira 6. Upon retirement from active competition he became an elder in the Japan Sumo Association. He reached the Sumo Association's mandatory retirement age of 65 in June 2003.

== Career record ==
- The Kyushu tournament was first held in 1957, and the Nagoya tournament in 1958.

Oiteyama Hirokuni
Year	January Hatsu basho, Tokyo	March Haru basho, Osaka	May Natsu basho, Tokyo	July Nagoya basho, Nagoya	September Aki basho, Tokyo	November Kyūshū basho, Fukuoka
1953	x	x	Shinjo; 0–3	Not held	East Jonokuchi #1; 2–6	Not held
1954	East Jonidan #64; 5–3	West Jonidan #24; 5–3	East Jonidan #7; 3–5	Not held	West Jonidan #11; 5–3	Not held
1955	West Sandanme #66; 5–3	East Sandanme #40; 5–3	East Sandanme #24; 4–4	Not held	East Sandanme #20; 7–1	Not held
1956	West Makushita #59; 5–3	East Makushita #46; 4–4	West Makushita #44; 5–3	Not held	West Makushita #39; 5–3	Not held
1957	West Makushita #27; 5–3	West Makushita #18; 3–5	West Makushita #23; 5–3	Not held	West Makushita #19; 4–4	West Makushita #19; 3–3–2
1958	West Makushita #26; 5–3	East Makushita #20; 6–2	West Makushita #11; 4–4	West Makushita #10; 4–4	West Makushita #9; 6–2	East Makushita #3; 7–1
1959	West Jūryō #22; 12–3–P	West Jūryō #7; 7–8	West Jūryō #8; 9–6	East Jūryō #6; 6–9	West Jūryō #9; 7–8	East Jūryō #10; 8–7
1960	West Jūryō #8; 9–6	West Jūryō #5; 11–4	West Maegashira #17; 8–7	East Maegashira #13; 3–12	East Jūryō #6; 8–7	East Jūryō #5; 5–10
1961	West Jūryō #10; 9–6	East Jūryō #5; 8–7	West Jūryō #2; 6–9	East Jūryō #6; 10–5	West Jūryō #1; 7–8	West Jūryō #3; 10–5
1962	West Maegashira #13; 9–6	West Maegashira #9; 6–9	West Maegashira #10; 9–6	West Maegashira #8; 8–7	West Maegashira #7; 8–7	East Maegashira #6; 4–11
1963	West Maegashira #12; 6–9	West Maegashira #15; 5–10	West Jūryō #5; 7–8	West Jūryō #6; 6–9	West Jūryō #8; 5–10	East Jūryō #16; 9–6
1964	West Jūryō #7; 9–6	East Jūryō #5; 9–6	West Jūryō #3; 6–9	East Jūryō #8; 7–8	East Jūryō #9; 10–5	West Jūryō #3; 13–2; Champion
1965	East Maegashira #13; 9–6	West Maegashira #7; Sat out due to injury 0–0–15	East Jūryō #2; 5–10	East Jūryō #7; 7–8	West Jūryō #7; 8–7	East Jūryō #5; 6–9
1966	East Jūryō #7; 9–6	East Jūryō #2; 10–5	East Maegashira #14; 9–6	West Maegashira #9; 6–9	West Maegashira #11; 8–7	West Maegashira #6; 6–9
1967	East Maegashira #10; 3–12	East Jūryō #5; 8–7	East Jūryō #6; 9–6	West Jūryō #2; 5–10	East Jūryō #9; 9–6	West Jūryō #5; 7–8
1968	West Jūryō #6; 8–7	East Jūryō #4; 6–9	East Jūryō #9; 7–7–1	West Jūryō #10; 9–6	West Jūryō #4; 4–11	East Jūryō #12; 9–6
1969	West Jūryō #7; 9–6	East Jūryō #4; 5–10	East Jūryō #12; Retired; 5–10	x	x	x
Record given as wins–losses–absences Top division champion Top division runner-up Retired Lower divisions Non-participation Sanshō key: F=Fighting spirit; O=Outstanding performance; T=Technique Also shown: ★=Kinboshi; P=Playoff(s); Divisions: Makuuchi — Jūryō — Makushita — Sandanme — Jonidan — Jonokuchi Makuuchi ranks: Yokozuna — Ōzeki — Sekiwake — Komusubi — Maegashira

== See also ==
- Glossary of sumo terms
- List of past sumo wrestlers
- List of sumo tournament second division champions
