= Brian Johansen =

Danish boxer

Personal information
- Nationality: Danish
- Born: 18 June 1972 (age 53) Aalborg, Denmark

Sport
- Sport: Boxing

Brian Johansen (born 18 June 1972) is a Danish boxer. He competed in the men's middleweight event at the 1996 Summer Olympics.

== See also ==
- "Boksning: Brian Johansen bliver professionel". Jyllands-Posten (in Danish). 2 November 2000.
- "Dansk trio er tæt på OL fire år før planen". TV2 (in Danish). 4 June 2021.
- "Bokser kvalificerer Danmark til OL for første gang siden 2012". Nordjyske (in Danish). 28 June 2023.
- Jeggesen, Dorte (18 April 2012). "Første danske OL-bokser i 16 år". DR (in Danish).
