= Mahenge Zulu =

Italian boxer (1965–2019)

Personal information
- Nationality: Italian
- Born: Ekoli Mahenge Zulu; November 21, 1965 Kinshasa, Democratic Republic of the Congo
- Died: August 27, 2019 (aged 53)
- Height: 5 ft 10 in (1.78 m)
- Weight: Welterweight

Boxing career
- Stance: Orthodox

Boxing record
- Total fights: 21
- Wins: 17
- Win by KO: 7
- Losses: 3
- Draws: 1
- No contests: 0

Ekoli Mahenge Zulu (November 21, 1965 – August 27, 2019) was an African-born, Italian boxer. He competed in the welterweight category.

== Biography ==
Mahenge Zulu was born in Kinshasa, Democratic Republic of the Congo. He grew up in Pesaro, in the region of Marche, in Italy.

He started boxing at the age of 15 and made his professional debut at 25, later than most boxers. In 1996 he won the IBF Intercontinental welterweight title. He retired after his loss against Félix Trinidad in a 1998 fight for the IBF welterweight title at the age of 33, ending his boxing career with a record of 17 wins, 3 losses and 1 draw.

He died of a heart attack on August 27, 2019, while on a flight to the Democratic Republic of the Congo, formerly known as Zaire. He had suffered some heart and blood pressure issues days before and was warned by his doctor to not fly. Zulu was married to Emilia Bonse, who died in 2016. They have four daughters.

An intelligent man, Zulu was fluent in four languages, including Italian and Spanish.

== Professional Boxing Record ==
21 fights	17 wins	3 losses
By knockout	6	1
By decision	11	2
Draws	1	

No.	Result	Record	Opponent	Type	Round, time	Date	Location	Notes
21	Loss	17–1–3	(Puerto Rico) Félix Trinidad	KO	4 (12), 2:31	Mar 3, 1998	Coliseo Rubén Rodríguez, Bayamón, Puerto Rico	For IBF welterweight title
20	Win	17–1–2	(Belgium) Marino Monteyne	UD	12	Aug 2, 1997	Pesaro, Italy	
19	Win	16–1–2	(Italy) Nico Toriri	UD	12	Aug 17, 1996	Catanzaro, Italy	Won IBF Intercontinental welterweight title
18	Win	15–1–2	(Montenegro) Mirsad Ramusovic	TKO	4 (10)	Feb 1, 1996	Rome, Italy	
17	Win	14–1–2	(Kosovo) Tibor Horvath	KO	6 (12)	Dec 14, 1995	Valdagno, Italy	
16	Win	13–1–2	(Russia) Leri Dzebniauri	UD	10	Oct 27, 1995	Pesaro, Italy	
15	Win	12–1–2	(Hungary) Joszef Zoltan Nagy	UD	10	Jul 22, 1995	Montelabbate, Italy	
14	Win	11–1–2	(Russia) Oleg Kolchanov	UD	10	Aug 24, 1994	San Benedetto del Tronto, Italy	
13	Win	10–1–2	(United States) Lemark Davis	UD	10	May 10, 1994	Echirolles, France	
12	Win	9–1–2	(Nigeria) Itoro Mkpanam	UD	10	Sep 29, 1993	Palazzetto del Ghiaccio, Pesaro, Italy	
11	Win	8–1–2	(Hungary) Csaba Csik	TKO	6 (10)	Mar 30, 1993	Pesaro, Italy	
10	Draw	7–1–2	(United States) Curtis Summit	TKO	10	Jun 13, 1992	Palais Marcel Cerdan, Levallois-Perret, France	
9	Win	7–0–2	(Czech Republic) Gejza Stipak	TKO	6 (8)	May 30, 1992	Civitavecchia, Italy	
8	Win	6–0–2	(Ghana) Judas Clottey	TKO	1 (8), 2:54	May 30, 1992	Pesaro, Italy	
7	Win	5–0–2	(Italy) Piero Severini	UD	8	Feb 19, 1992	San Pellegrino Terme, Italy	
6	Win	4–0–2	(Italy) Riccardo Fiore	UD	8	Aug 24, 1991	Pesaro, Italy	
5	Loss	3–0–2	(Italy) Valentino Manca	UD	6	Jul 27, 1991	Pesaro, Italy	
4	Win	3–0–1	(Algeria) Khemissi Bahloul	DQ	5 (6)	Dec 21, 1990	Pesaro, Italy	
3	Win	2–0–1	(Hungary) Imre Bacskai	UD	4	Oct 12, 1990	Pesaro, Italy	
2	Loss	1–0–1	(Nigeria) Itoro Mkpanam	UD	4	Aug 31, 1990	Rossano, Italy	
1	Win	1–0–0	(Algeria) Nabil Tennoune	KO	2 (4)	Apr 27, 1990	Pesaro, Italy	
