= Vyacheslav Kabanov =

Uzbekistani swimmer (born 1968)

Personal information
- Born: 8 August 1968 (age 57)

Sport
- Sport: Swimming
Medal record
Representing Uzbekistan
Asian Games
Bronze medal – third place	1994 Hiroshima	4x100m freestyle relay

Vyacheslav Kabanov (born 8 August 1968) is an Uzbekistani freestyle swimmer. He competed in three events at the 1996 Summer Olympics.
