= Selam Woldemariam =

Ethiopian musician and guitarist

- Also known as: Selamino
- Born: Selam Seyoum Woldemariam; 10 June 1954 (age 72); Addis Ababa, Ethiopian Empire
- Genres: R&B; Ethiopian music; Afropop
- Occupations: Producer guitarist; production consultant; writer; arranger
- Instrument: Guitar
- Formerly of: Black Soul Band; Ibex Band; ROHA Band; Tomas Doncker Band

Selam Seyoum Woldemariam (born 10 June 1954), also known as Selamino, is an Ethiopian musician and guitarist. He has turned out 250 albums in his more than forty years as a professional musician.

== Early life ==
Selam Seyoum Woldemariam was born in Addis Ababa, Ethiopia, in 1954 to a director-teacher, Seyoum Woldemariam Kidane, and an assistant teacher-housewife, Tsirha Nemariam. While in Ethiopia, his father worked in a school run by American missionaries. The family owned an acoustic guitar, and while each of his siblings tried to learn, he was the most disciplined in his musical study. He was 10 or 11 years old when he went to Asmara with his family. During the mid-1960s, Woldemariam formed a church music quintet choir group in Asmara at Geza Kenisha, which became popular and pulled hundreds of followers to the church where they performed. Later, they included a Swedish drummer but the sound eventually became too noisy for the elderly congregation and they had to discontinue playing. Woldemariam moved to Addis Ababa in 1972 and finished high school. This was at the height of the Ethiopian Civil War and classes in most schools, including Addis Ababa University were disrupted. Soon, all higher learning institutions were closed, while students and staff were forced to join the national campaign (Idget Behibret). With the Addis Ababa University closed, Woldemariam could no longer continue his education.

Woldemariam later returned and graduated with a bachelor's of arts degree in history from Addis Ababa University in 1988. He wrote his senior essay on Ethiopian music: "Origin and Development of Zemenawi Music in Ethiopia, 1896-1974".

== Career ==
He joined The Black Soul Band while they were on tour in Addis Ababa in 1973. Alemayehu Eshete and Slim Jones were the main singers of the group and together with Tesfaye Lemma of Orchestra Ethiopia, they traveled to various parts of Ethiopia. Towards mid-1974, Woldemariam and some other members of Black Soul Band joined the Venus Club. After working for a year or so at the Venus Club, Woldemariam replaced Zimbabwean Ibex Band guitar player Andrew Wilson at the Ras Hotel. During that time, Ibex was dominated by two foreign musicians: Ismail Jingo, vocalist and percussionist and Andrew Wilson, lead guitarist. At the time, most foreigners were leaving Ethiopia due to the revolution and Jingo and Wilson couldn't stay. As a result, the band re-formed as Ibex (II) with the inclusion of some new members. Mahmoud Ahmed was already in the group. The first recording the group did was his Ere Mela Mela album (LP) around 1975, which was later to become their first ever CD in Ethiopian history, released by a good friend, Francis Falceto on his Éthiopiques series, Éthiopiques # 7. Ibex disbanded in 1979 as most of its members left for the Sudan, while Mahmoud left for the US. The remaining three members, Giovanni Rico, Fekadu Andemeskel and Selam Woldemariam, formed ROHA Band. The Ibex and ROHA Band dominated the music of the 1970s and 1980s. They arranged and recorded well over 250 albums, 2500 songs, accompanying various Ethiopian singers. From 1980 to 1990, The ROHA Band traveled extensively, throughout Europe, the Middle East, and the US as well as to some parts of Africa. Mulatu Astatke joined the ROHA Band at the Paris and Spain summer shows in 1987.

== Recent works ==
During 2000, Woldemariam moved to the US, and started collaboration on the Power of The Trinity project with the Brooklyn-based Tomas Doncker Band. Besides co-writing and playing guitar on some tunes, Woldemariam is also involved as a production consultant. He has performed with the group at various venues including Blue Note Jazz Club N.Y., City Winery and the long-awaited show at the New York Summer stage in July and August 2012. Woldemariam is in the process of expanding his thesis paper on Ethiopian music and gathering together a book based on his over forty years of experience in music. He has also released his new "GRACE" instrumental album in 2020 available on all social platforms, including iTunes, CD Baby, YouTube and Spotify. "GRACE" is nominated in two categories for the WammiesDC Award 2021.
