= Félix Trinidad =

Puerto Rican boxer (born 1973)

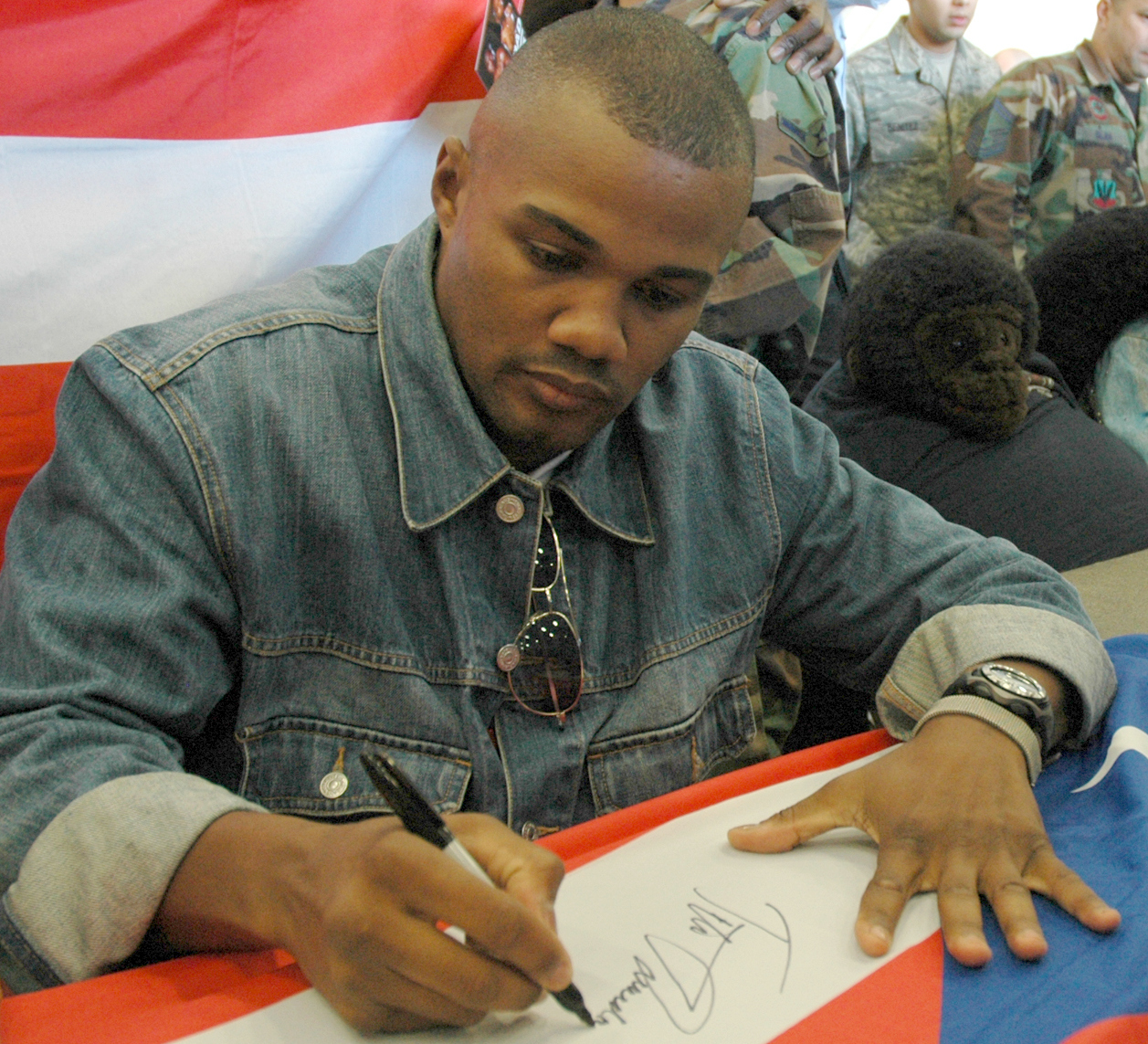
- Trinidad during a visit to a military facility, 2007

Personal information
- Nickname: Tito
- Born: Félix Juan Trinidad García; January 10, 1973 (age 53) Fajardo, Puerto Rico
- Height: 5 ft 11 in (180 cm)
- Weight: Welterweight; Light middleweight; Middleweight

Boxing career
- Reach: 72 in (183 cm)
- Stance: Orthodox

Boxing record
- Total fights: 45
- Wins: 42
- Win by KO: 35
- Losses: 3

Félix Juan Trinidad García (born January 10, 1973), professionally known as Tito Trinidad, is a Puerto Rican former professional boxer who competed from 1990 to 2008. He held multiple world championships in three weight classes and is considered to be one of the greatest Puerto Rican boxers of all time.

After winning five national amateur championships in Puerto Rico, Trinidad debuted as a professional when he was seventeen, and won his first world championship by defeating Maurice Blocker to win the IBF welterweight title in 1993, a title he would hold for almost seven years with fifteen defenses. As his career continued, he defeated Oscar De La Hoya to win the WBC and lineal welterweight titles in 1999; Fernando Vargas to win the unified WBA and IBF light middleweight titles in 2000; and William Joppy for the WBA middleweight title in 2001.

Trinidad's first professional loss was against Bernard Hopkins later in 2001, and following this, he retired from boxing for the first time. Trinidad made his ring return by defeating Ricardo Mayorga in 2004. After a losing effort against Winky Wright in 2005, he retired for a second time. In 2008 he returned once more and lost to Roy Jones Jr. Subsequently, Trinidad entered a hiatus without clarifying the status of his career.

Trinidad is frequently mentioned among the best Puerto Rican boxers of all time by sports journalists and analysts, along with Juan Laporte, Esteban De Jesús, Wilfredo Vázquez, Miguel Cotto, Wilfred Benítez, Wilfredo Gómez, Héctor Camacho, Edwin Rosario and Carlos Ortíz. In 2000, Trinidad was voted Fighter of the Year by The Ring magazine and the Boxing Writers Association of America. He is ranked number 30 on The Ring's list of 100 greatest punchers of all time and in 2002 named him the 51st greatest fighter of the past 80 years. In 2013, Trinidad became eligible and was voted into the 2014 Class of the International Boxing Hall of Fame. He was officially inducted into the hall during a ceremony held on June 4, 2014, becoming the tenth Puerto Rican to receive such an honor.

== Amateur career ==
Trinidad was champion in the International Boxing Federation, in the World Boxing Association, and the World Boxing Council. He had an impressive record with 42 wins and 3 losses, with 35 by knockout. His career as an athlete in this discipline began at 12 years of age, as he has won five awards at the amateur championships in his home country (100, 112, 119, 126, and 132 pounds), his amateur sheet was a record of 51–6.

== Professional career ==
=== Welterweight ===
Trinidad debuted as a professional on March 10, 1990, when he was 17 years old. The fight was against Angel Romero, another debuting boxer, in a contest that Trinidad won by knockout in the second round. At the beginning of his career, he knocked out nine of his first 10 opponents. He then competed against more experienced boxers like Jake Rodriguez, whom he fought on December 6, 1991. Trinidad won the fight by unanimous decision but suffered an injury on his right hand. He was then inactive for five months while recovering from the injury.

Raul Gonzalez fought Felix Trinidad on May 3, 1992, in Cayey, Puerto Rico. This fight was the main event of the night. Both Gonzalez and Trinidad weighed in at 142 pounds. Gonzalez had a record of 8-2-3 with 5 KOs, while Trinidad had a record of 13–0 with 10 KOs. Gonzalez went down three times, and Trinidad took the victory in round four by TKO. Trinidad would add another victory by KO to his record and would now make it 14–0 with 11 KOs.

==== Welterweight title ====
Trinidad traveled to San Diego, California, and defeated the IBF welterweight champion Maurice Blocker in two rounds, in a fight card on June 19, 1993, televised by Showtime. Trinidad spent the first two minutes of the fight analyzing Blocker's style. With 11 seconds left in the first round, one of Trinidad's punches injured Blocker, who barely survived the round. In the second round, the champion's condition improved, but after the first 30 seconds, another Trinidad punch injured him. Trinidad followed with a combination, scoring a knockout at 1:49 in the round when the referee stopped the fight. Afterward, tournament organizer Don King's exclusive relationship to stage fights for the cable channel Showtime meant that Trinidad would be showcased regularly on Showtime Championship Boxing.

==== Trinidad vs. Camacho ====
Trinidad defended his title for the next three years against several opponents. Trinidad's first fight in Las Vegas was against Héctor Camacho on January 29, 1994. He was cautious during the first rounds and received a cut over his left eye. In the third round he connected a solid combination that made Camacho change to a defensive stance. Throughout the fight Trinidad was on the offensive and won the fight by unanimous decision, in what was his first decision since he won the world championship. The scores awarded by the judges were 117–109, 116–110, and 119–106.

==== Trinidad vs. Campas ====
On September 17, 1994, Trinidad traveled to the MGM Grand for a second straight fight to compete in a title defense against Yori Boy Campas, who had a record of 56–0. In the second round Campas scored a knockdown, the second knockdown in Trinidad's career. Following this Trinidad exchanged several combinations, injuring Campas' face and breaking his nose. In the fourth round, the referee stopped the fight, the first defeat in Campas' career.

==== Trinidad vs. Carr ====
Trinidad's fourth fight outside Puerto Rico or the United States took place on Estadio de Beisbol in Monterrey, Mexico. Trinidad was scheduled to defend his title against the undefeated Oba Carr. In the second round, Carr scored a knockdown, which was the product of a quick right hand punch. Trinidad continued the fight and pursued the challenger, who displayed a quick pace throughout the fight. In the fourth round Trinidad connected a solid punch that injured Carr, and in the eighth he scored three consecutive knockdowns before the referee stopped the fight by technical knockout.

Trinidad spent the next four years defending his title against numerous fighters in bouts televised on Showtime. Among these fights was a defense against Mahenge Zulu, the number two challenger for Trinidad's championship. This fight was part of a card that took place on April 3, 1998, in Bayamón, Puerto Rico and marked the first time that Trinidad had performed in the island in five years. Trinidad began the first round by cautiously analyzing the challenger's style, but the round ended with quick exchanges after Zulu took the initiative in the offensive. In the second round Zulu was actively pursuing the champion, but retreated when he received a solid jab sequence. Early in the third round a series of jabs opened a wound on Zulu's mouth, while the challenger's punches were not reaching their target. Trinidad began the fourth round heavily on in the offensive connecting several combinations which hurt the challenger, using this to land more punches in Zulu's head and body. One punch hit Zulu in the jaw, he fell to the floor and tried to rise, but the referee stopped the fight before he could do so.

==== Trinidad vs. Whitaker ====
On February 20, 1999, Trinidad defended the welterweight championship against Pernell Whitaker, winning the fight by unanimous decision in a contest that marked his thirteenth successful defense. The fight began with both boxers displaying aggressive styles, which included excessive pushing. In the following rounds both boxers used their jabs most of the time with Trinidad gaining an advantage when Whitaker attempted to attack inside, eventually scoring a knockdown in round two. In the fourth, fifth and sixth rounds the fighters exchanged combinations. Later in the fight both boxers fell to the floor in what were ruled as "accidental slips." On the seventh round Whitaker displayed more offense, trading power punches with Trinidad, but the champion retained control in the fight's tempo during the eight, ninth, and tenth rounds. In the last round Whitaker, with a badly swollen right eye, displayed a purely defensive stance, avoiding his opponent throughout the round while Trinidad continued on the offensive until the fight concluded. The judges gave the champion scores of 117–111, 118–109 and 118–109.

==== Trinidad vs. De La Hoya ====
In the spring of 1999 Don King and Oscar De la Hoya's promoter, Bob Arum, agreed to co-promote a mega-fight for the Lineal, WBC and IBF welterweight championships on September 18, 1999, at the Mandalay Bay Hotel in Las Vegas. Early in the fight De la Hoya employed boxing to connect combinations while avoiding Trinidad's attacks. The second round began with both boxers trading punches but De la Hoya quickly returned to his previous tactic, which he employed in the third round. In the fourth round Trinidad pressured the offense while De la Hoya tried to avoid his punches by moving, both boxers eventually exchanged punches. In the fifth round Trinidad continued in the offensive while De la Hoya attempted to remain on the outside corners of the ring, Trinidad's eye was swollen following a trade of punches, and his nose was also bleeding. Trinidad was having a lot of problems finding De La Hoya and couldn't connect as flush as usual with his punches, although he scored at times, Oscar's movement was not letting him land in combination and it was proclaimed by many to have been a lackluster fight. In the eighth round the swelling on Trinidad's eye was worsening. Oscar was scoring on Trinidad but halfway through the tenth, De La Hoya stopped sticking and basically disengaged under instruction of his corner who thought the match was won. De La Hoya was to remain on his toes for the remainder of the bout, and Trinidad won the final 2 rounds. The judges controversially gave Trinidad a close, majority decision, with scores of 115–113, 115–114 and 114–114.

=== Light Middleweight ===
==== Light Middleweight title ====
In 2000 Trinidad vacated the welterweight championships and moved to the junior middleweight division, in order to challenge the World Boxing Association's champion David Reid. Early in the fight Trinidad concentrated his punches on Reid's body, connecting hard punches to his ribs and belly. In the second round Reid connected a solid punch to his opponent's jaw, and in the third round scored a knockdown. In the fourth and fifth rounds Trinidad used his jab consistently, gaining control of the fight's tempo in the sixth round. The fight's score was close at the beginning of the seventh round but Trinidad opened the second half of the contest in the offensive, scoring the fight's second knockdown. Controlling the fight in the eighth, ninth and tenth rounds, and opening a cut over Reid's eye. Trinidad dominated the eleventh round, scoring three consecutive knockdowns. Reid tried to close the fight on the offensive but his opponent boxed and countered his attacks. The judges gave scores of 114–107, 114–106 and 115–106, all in favor of Trinidad.

==== Trinidad vs. Vargas ====
On December 2, 2000, he was scheduled to fight in a unification card against Fernando Vargas, the International Boxing Federation's junior middleweight champion. The fight began in a fast pace with Trinidad connecting a solid left hook that led to his opponent being knocked down. Vargas was able to stand up, but another classic left hook led to another knockdown. Early in the second round Trinidad was in the offensive but Vargas connected a solid combination at the round's closing moments which caused a slight swelling under Trinidad's right eye. In the fourth round's opening seconds a Vargas' short left hook connected on Trinidad's jaw and he fell on his backside getting up immediately., marking the eighth knockdown in his career. In the fifth round Vargas was in control of the fight's offensive, connecting combinations to Trinidad's body. In the sixth round Trinidad regained control of the fight's tempo that lasted throughout the contest, connecting punches on Vargas' head and left jabs to the ribs. In the eighth, Vargas displayed signs of exhaustion which slowed his offensive while Trinidad then pursued the offense with combinations to the body. This pattern continued throughout the ninth, tenth and eleventh rounds. Opening the final round Vargas was on the offensive, connecting a solid left hook. Trinidad countered the attack with a left hook that made Vargas collapse; Vargas was able to stand up, but was subsequently knocked down for a second time. With Vargas injured, Trinidad continued connecting combinations, and he ended his combination by putting Vargas down for the 3rd time in the round with a right hand which resulted in the referee waving the fight off, making Trinidad the winner. During the fight, Trinidad was penalized twice for low blows, although the second one was legal, being exactly on the beltline. Vargas himself was penalized the same amount of times.

=== Middleweight ===
==== Trinidad vs. Joppy ====
Following his fight with Vargas, Trinidad moved up in weight – this time to participate in Don King's middleweight unification tournament featuring IBF champion Bernard Hopkins, WBA champion William Joppy, and WBC champion Keith Holmes. Trinidad was matched with Joppy, whom he defeated by technical knockout in the fifth round of a contest that took place on May 12, 2001. Joppy opened the first round on the offensive, but late in the round Trinidad scored a knockdown with a combination of punches that came close to throwing Joppy underneath the ropes. Trinidad subsequently scored a knockdown in the fourth round, during this stage of the competition he was using combinations of left hooks and right punches to the head. In the fifth round Trinidad scored another knockdown, Joppy attempted to continue the fight, but while he was using the ropes to help him stand, the referee stopped the fight. When the contest was over, Trinidad explained his strategy by stating: "I knew he wanted to impose his will, his weight, and I wouldn't let him do it".

==== Trinidad vs. Hopkins ====
The middleweight unification fight between Hopkins and Trinidad was originally scheduled for September 15, 2001, at the Madison Square Garden. On the morning of September 11, terrorists attacked the World Trade Center. Following this incident, the fight was postponed indefinitely. After receiving assurances from Madison Square Garden officials and the City of New York, Don King rescheduled the fight for September 29. The pace of the fight in the early rounds was slow, with each boxer studying his opponent. In the second round, Hopkins connected some combinations, while Trinidad pursued the offensive in the fourth round and both boxers traded sequences of punches. This pattern continued in the fifth round, with Trinidad showing an aggressive style while Hopkins relied on jabs. In the sixth, Trinidad continued an offensive stance and won the round after trading several combinations. Both fighters continued to exchange punches in the eighth and ninth round, with Hopkins connecting three consecutive solid punches. In the twelfth round, Hopkins scored a knockdown, but before the contest could continue Trinidad's father entered the ring, which led to the referee stopping the fight by technical knockout.

Prior to the fight, members of Hopkins's team visited the Trinidad dressing room in what is considered a normal boxing custom, to watch the taping of Trinidad's hands. The Hopkins camp claimed that Trinidad's hands were wrapped incorrectly, and threatened to cancel the fight unless they were rewrapped correctly. Nazim Richardson, who was part of Hopkins corner for the Trinidad fight, clarified that Trinidad's wraps were not wrapped in accordance to the New York Commission laws, but his hand wraps did conform to the rules of other States.

=== Next fight ===
Trinidad was subsequently scheduled to fight against Hacine Cherifi in a contest that he won by technical knockout in the fourth round. The event was part of a card that took place on May 11, 2002, and was organized in San Juan, Puerto Rico. Early in the first round Trinidad's strategy consisted of using his jab while Cherifi did not try to directly engage in the offensive. In the last minute of the round a punch by Trinidad hit Cherifi's chin leaving him disoriented, he followed this with a combination and scored a knockdown. In the second round, Trinidad displayed more boxing and was on the offensive by using combinations to the head and ribs. In the third Cherifi landed more punches than in the previous two, but Trinidad relied on throwing left jabs. One of his punches hit Cherifi's liver, followed by a punch to the jaw, making Cherifi fall to the floor. In the fourth, a series of combinations injured Cherifi, who collapsed to the floor twice, forfeiting the fight on the second occasion. Following this contest Trinidad announced his retirement, at the moment leaving the sport with a record of 41 wins, one defeat, and 34 wins by knockout.

=== Comeback ===
==== Trinidad vs. Mayorga ====
Trinidad announced a comeback on March 2, 2004. On October 2, 2004, he fought against Ricardo Mayorga, in Madison Square Garden. Early in the first round Mayorga was on the offensive connecting several combinations, later in the round Trinidad connected some punches to his opponent's face. Mayorga reacted defiantly while lowering his defense, which Trinidad used to continue the offensive during the closing seconds. In the second round he continued connecting with combinations to Mayorga's face which caused him to bleed from his nose; the round concluded with both fighters exchanging punches. In the third round Mayorga attempted to counter with punches to the body but did not do significant damage to his opponent, however later in the round one of these punches made Trinidad lose his balance and touch the floor with one glove which the referee counted as a knockdown. In the fourth round both boxers traded hard combinations. In the fifth Trinidad displayed control of the offense's tempo injuring Mayorga and opening a cut under one of his eyes. This pattern continued in the sixth and seventh round, and the cut on Mayorga's face began to swell. In the eight round Trinidad scored several knockdowns, Mayorga continued after two knockdowns, but lost by technical knockout following a third knockdown.

==== Trinidad vs. Wright ====
On May 14, 2005, Trinidad competed against Winky Wright, in a fight where the winner would become the World Boxing Council's number one challenger in the Middleweight division. Wright won the fight by decision, receiving scores of 120–107 and 119–108 twice by the judges. Trinidad's fighting style appeared to be out of rhythm in the first round, while Wright presented a defensive stance and relied on jabs. During the first three rounds Wright was in the offensive scoring with jabs. On the fourth round Trinidad connected a solid combination. In the sixth, Wright continued the strategy used in the previous rounds while Trinidad employed a strategy where he tried to neutralize his opponent's punches by standing in front of him. In the later rounds Trinidad tried to take the contest's offensive but his adversary managed to block most of his punches while continuing his previous tactic. In the twelfth round Trinidad pursued Wright while trying to score a knockout, but his opponent boxed away from him until the round ended. Following this fight, Trinidad retired temporarily, after his father informed him that he would not continue in his corner.

=== Second comeback ===
==== Trinidad vs. Jones Jr. ====
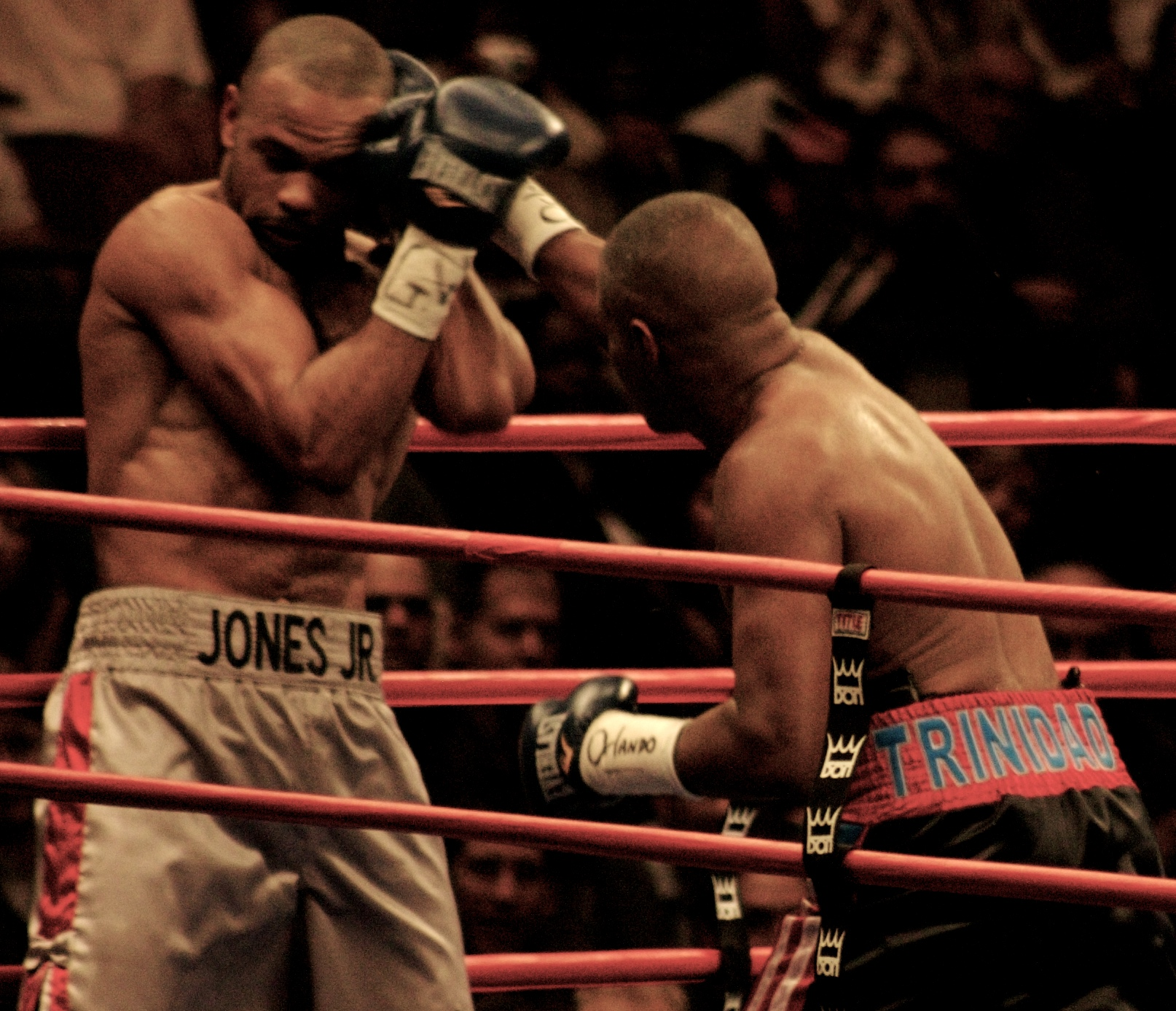
Trinidad (right) throws a punch at Jones Jr.

Trinidad came out of his second retirement for a fight against former four-division champion Roy Jones Jr. on January 19, 2008. According to the contract, it was contested at a catchweight of 170 lb (77 kg), and was broadcast live on HBO pay-per-view. The card took place at Madison Square Garden in New York City. Trinidad began the fight on the offensive and won the first two rounds. The third and fourth rounds were won by Jones who relied on the velocity of his punches. This pattern continued in the fifth and sixth rounds. In the seventh round, Jones scored a knockdown following a right hand. Following this Jones continued to use his speed while Trinidad pursued the offensive, in the tenth round Jones scored a second knockdown after landing a combination. The judges declared the fight a unanimous decision in favor of Jones with scores of 117–109 and 116–110 twice.

=== Retirement ===
After this fight, Trinidad was inactive for almost two years, before announcing on October 14, 2009, that he was "between 95 and 98 percent sure (that he would) not do anything more within boxing". During this timeframe, he made sporadic public appearances, attending boxing cards and participating in public activities, including a ceremony where Juan Manuel López and Iván Calderón received rings for five successful defenses of their world championships. Beginning in July 2009, Trinidad became involved with the World Wrestling Council, participating as a guest referee at their anniversary show. Three months later, he was included in a storyline that also included Orlando Colón. In 2010, Trinidad expressed interest in purchasing the Changos de Naranjito.

On September 12, 2018, judge Anthony Cuevas Ramos signed a letter which declared that the Banco Popular de Puerto Rico must pay Trinidad $2,000,000 within 24 hours, due to them owing him interest money from his personal accounts at the bank.

On February 13, 2023, the Trinidads reached a confidential agreement to solve their problems with their debtors, including Banco Popular de Puerto Rico, without going to court.

== Personal life ==
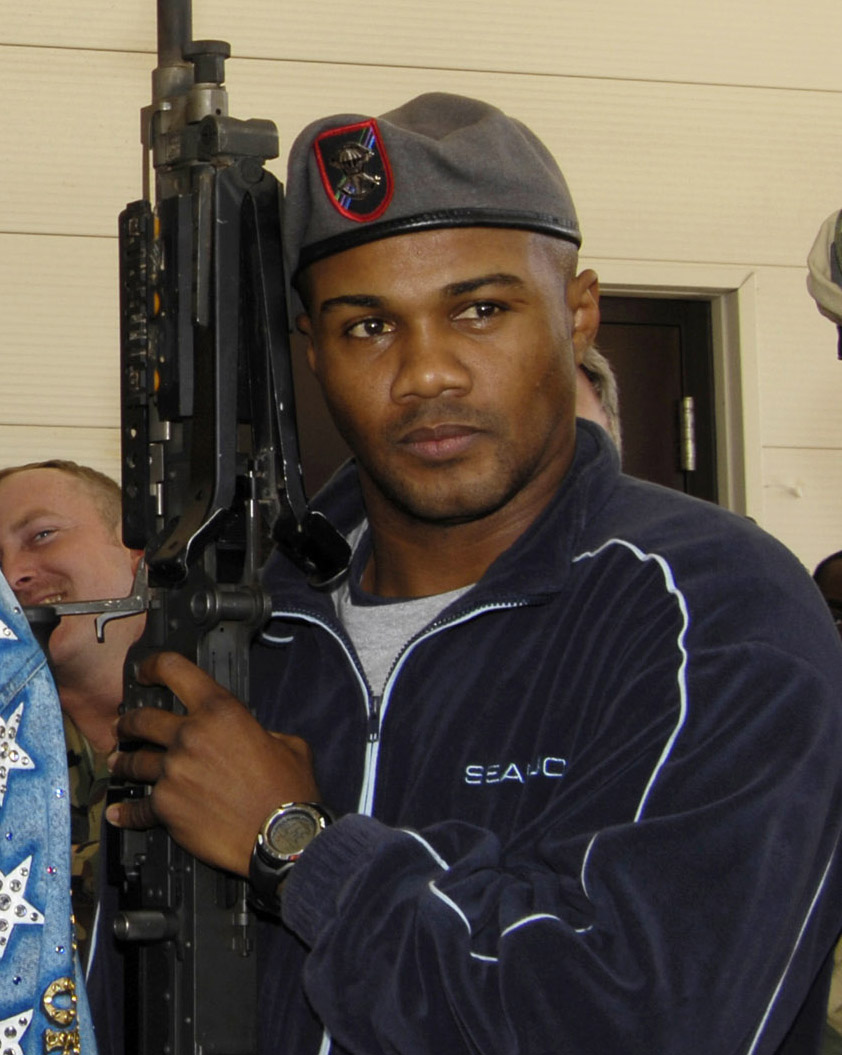
Trinidad visiting a military facility in 2007

Félix Trinidad was born in Fajardo, Puerto Rico, to a Puerto Rican family. During his childhood the family moved to Cupey Alto, a subdivision of San Juan, Puerto Rico, where he grew up. His future wife, Sharon Santiago, lived in Cupey and first met Trinidad in the home of her neighborhood friend, a classmate of Trinidad's. Trinidad pursued a relationship with Santiago, including an attempt to impress her with his red Ford Mustang. He continued to press for her affection and, with the help of Santiago's neighbor, Trinidad was able to win her over. Early on, Santiago's mother thought that Trinidad was related to her daughter's friend, but she realized the true situation when she visited the friend's house and he acted nervous in her presence. Santiago's father objected to the relationship because Trinidad was an athlete; at the time many athletes had a negative public image. Santiago became rebellious, but Trinidad eventually won her family's trust. The couple was married four years after they began dating and have had four daughters. Trinidad has a fifth daughter, named Alondra Nicole, from another relationship.

== Professional boxing record ==
| 45 fights | 42 wins | 3 losses |
|---|---|---|
| By knockout | 35 | 1 |
| By decision | 7 | 2 |

| No. | Result | Record | Opponent | Type | Round, time | Date | Location | Notes |
|---|---|---|---|---|---|---|---|---|
| 45 | Loss | 42–3 | Roy Jones Jr. | UD | 12 | Jan 19, 2008 | Madison Square Garden, New York City, New York, U.S. | |
| 44 | Loss | 42–2 | Winky Wright | UD | 12 | May 14, 2005 | MGM Grand Garden Arena, Paradise, Nevada, U.S. | WBC Middleweight Title Eliminator |
| 43 | Win | 42–1 | Ricardo Mayorga | TKO | 8 (12), 2:39 | Oct 2, 2004 | Madison Square Garden, New York City, New York, U.S. | Won vacant NABC middleweight title |
| 42 | Win | 41–1 | Hacine Cherifi | TKO | 4 (10), 2:32 | May 11, 2002 | Roberto Clemente Coliseum, San Juan, Puerto Rico | |
| 41 | Loss | 40–1 | Bernard Hopkins | TKO | 12 (12), 1:18 | Sep 29, 2001 | Madison Square Garden, New York City, New York, U.S. | Lost WBA middleweight title; For WBC and IBF middleweight titles |
| 40 | Win | 40–0 | William Joppy | TKO | 5 (12), 2:25 | May 12, 2001 | Madison Square Garden, New York City, New York, U.S. | Won WBA middleweight title |
| 39 | Win | 39–0 | Fernando Vargas | TKO | 12 (12), 1:33 | Dec 2, 2000 | Mandalay Bay Events Center, Paradise, Nevada, U.S. | Retained WBA light middleweight title; Won IBF light middleweight title |
| 38 | Win | 38–0 | Mamadou Thiam | TKO | 3 (12), 2:48 | Jul 22, 2000 | American Airlines Arena, Miami, Florida, U.S. | Retained WBA light middleweight title |
| 37 | Win | 37–0 | David Reid | UD | 12 | Mar 3, 2000 | Caesars Palace, Paradise, Nevada, U.S. | Won WBA light middleweight title |
| 36 | Win | 36–0 | Oscar De La Hoya | MD | 12 | Sep 18, 1999 | Mandalay Bay Events Center, Paradise, Nevada, U.S. | Retained IBF welterweight title; Won WBC welterweight title |
| 35 | Win | 35–0 | Hugo Pineda | KO | 4 (12), 2:53 | May 29, 1999 | Roberto Clemente Coliseum, San Juan, Puerto Rico | Retained IBF welterweight title |
| 34 | Win | 34–0 | Pernell Whitaker | UD | 12 | Feb 20, 1999 | Madison Square Garden, New York City, New York, U.S. | Retained IBF welterweight title |
| 33 | Win | 33–0 | Mahenge Zulu | KO | 4 (12), 2:20 | Apr 3, 1998 | Coliseo Rubén Rodríguez, Bayamón, Puerto Rico | Retained IBF welterweight title |
| 32 | Win | 32–0 | Troy Waters | KO | 1 (12), 2:50 | Aug 23, 1997 | Madison Square Garden, New York City, New York, U.S. | Retained IBF welterweight title |
| 31 | Win | 31–0 | Kevin Lueshing | TKO | 3 (12), 2:59 | Jan 11, 1997 | Nashville Arena, Nashville, Tennessee, U.S. | Retained IBF welterweight title |
| 30 | Win | 30–0 | Ray Lovato | TKO | 6 (12), 1:57 | Sep 7, 1996 | MGM Grand Garden Arena, Paradise, Nevada, U.S. | Retained IBF welterweight title |
| 29 | Win | 29–0 | Freddie Pendleton | KO | 5 (12), 1:30 | May 18, 1996 | The Mirage, Paradise, Nevada, U.S. | Retained IBF welterweight title |
| 28 | Win | 28–0 | Rodney Moore | RTD | 4 (12), 3:00 | Feb 10, 1996 | MGM Grand Garden Arena, Paradise, Nevada, U.S. | Retained IBF welterweight title |
| 27 | Win | 27–0 | Larry Barnes | TKO | 4 (12), 2:54 | Nov 18, 1995 | Convention Hall, Atlantic City, New Jersey, U.S. | Retained IBF welterweight title |
| 26 | Win | 26–0 | Roger Turner | TKO | 2 (12), 2:28 | Apr 8, 1995 | Caesars Palace, Paradise, Nevada, U.S. | Retained IBF welterweight title |
| 25 | Win | 25–0 | Oba Carr | TKO | 8 (12), 2:41 | Dec 10, 1994 | Estadio de Béisbol, Monterrey, Mexico | Retained IBF welterweight title |
| 24 | Win | 24–0 | Luis Ramon Campas | TKO | 4 (12), 2:41 | Sep 17, 1994 | MGM Grand Garden Arena, Paradise, Nevada, U.S. | Retained IBF welterweight title |
| 23 | Win | 23–0 | Héctor Camacho | UD | 12 | Jan 29, 1994 | MGM Grand Garden Arena, Paradise, Nevada, U.S. | Retained IBF welterweight title |
| 22 | Win | 22–0 | Anthony Stephens | KO | 10 (12), 2:09 | Oct 23, 1993 | Broward County Convention Center, Fort Lauderdale, Florida, U.S. | Retained IBF welterweight title |
| 21 | Win | 21–0 | Luis Garcia | TKO | 1 (12), 2:31 | Aug 6, 1993 | Coliseo Rubén Rodríguez, Bayamón, Puerto Rico | Retained IBF welterweight title |
| 20 | Win | 20–0 | Maurice Blocker | KO | 2 (12), 1:49 | Jun 19, 1993 | Sports Arena, San Diego, California, U.S. | Won IBF welterweight title |
| 19 | Win | 19–0 | Colin Tomlinson | KO | 1 (10), 2:41 | May 8, 1993 | Condado, San Juan, Puerto Rico | |
| 18 | Win | 18–0 | Pedro Aguirre | TKO | 4 (10) | Feb 20, 1993 | Estadio Azteca, Mexico City, Mexico | |
| 17 | Win | 17–0 | Henry Hughes | TKO | 1 (10) | Feb 13, 1993 | Roberto Clemente Coliseum, San Juan, Puerto Rico | |
| 16 | Win | 16–0 | Alberto de las Mercedes Cortes | TKO | 3 (10) | Oct 3, 1992 | Cirque d'hiver, Paris, France | |
| 15 | Win | 15–0 | Joseph Alexander | KO | 1 (10) | Jul 18, 1992 | San Juan, Puerto Rico | |
| 14 | Win | 14–0 | Raul Gonzalez | TKO | 4 (10) | May 3, 1992 | Cayey, Puerto Rico | |
| 13 | Win | 13–0 | Jake Rodriguez | UD | 10 | Dec 6, 1991 | Sands Hotel, Bayamón, Puerto Rico | |
| 12 | Win | 12–0 | Lorenzo Bouie | TKO | 1 (10), 2:40 | Oct 25, 1991 | Mahi Temple Shriners Auditorium, Miami, Florida, U.S. | |
| 11 | Win | 11–0 | Darren McGrew | UD | 10 | Jul 10, 1991 | Caribe Hilton Hotel, San Juan, Puerto Rico | |
| 10 | Win | 10–0 | Manuel Salas | TKO | 5 (10), 2:27 | Jun 21, 1991 | Tamiami Park, Miami, Florida, U.S. | |
| 9 | Win | 9–0 | Felix Vasquez | TKO | 3 (8) | May 1, 1991 | San Juan, Puerto Rico | |
| 8 | Win | 8–0 | Noe Rivera | TKO | 1 (6), 2:54 | Mar 13, 1991 | San Juan, Puerto Rico | |
| 7 | Win | 7–0 | Luis Felipe Perez | TKO | 2 (6), 2:01 | Nov 13, 1990 | El San Juan Hotel & Casino, San Juan, Puerto Rico | |
| 6 | Win | 6–0 | Valentin Ocasio | UD | 6 | Oct 3, 1990 | El San Juan Hotel & Casino, San Juan, Puerto Rico | |
| 5 | Win | 5–0 | Jose Vilarino | KO | 2 (6) | Sep 6, 1990 | El San Juan Hotel & Casino, San Juan, Puerto Rico | |
| 4 | Win | 4–0 | Omar Victoriano Alegre | TKO | 5 (8) | Jul 27, 1990 | Outdoor Arena, Capo d'Orlando, Italy | |
| 3 | Win | 3–0 | William Lopez | TKO | 1 (4) | Jun 21, 1990 | El San Juan Resort & Casino, San Juan, Puerto Rico | |
| 2 | Win | 2–0 | Israel Ponce | TKO | 2 (4) | Apr 7, 1990 | Miramar, San Juan, Puerto Rico | |
| 1 | Win | 1–0 | Angel Romero | KO | 2 (4) | Mar 10, 1990 | Miramar, San Juan, Puerto Rico | |

== Titles in boxing ==
=== Major world titles ===
- IBF welterweight champion (147 lbs)
- WBC welterweight champion (147 lbs)
- WBA light middleweight champion (154 lbs)
- IBF light middleweight champion (154 lbs)
- WBA middleweight champion (160 lbs)

=== Regional/International titles ===
- NABC middleweight champion (160 lbs)

=== Lineal titles ===
- Lineal welterweight champion (147 lbs)

== Pay-per-view bouts ==
| No. | Date | Fight | Billing | Buys | Network |
|---|---|---|---|---|---|
| 1 | September 18, 1999 | De La Hoya vs. Trinidad | Fight of the Millennium | 1,400,000 | HBO |
| 2 | December 2, 2000 | Trinidad vs. Vargas | Forces of Destruction | 520,000 | HBO |
| 3 | May 12, 2001 | Trinidad vs. Joppy | History in the Making | 350,000 | HBO |
| 4 | September 29, 2001 | Trinidad vs. Hopkins | And Then There Was One | 475,000 | HBO |
| 5 | October 2, 2004 | Trinidad vs. Mayorga | Back with a Vengeance | 420,000 | HBO |
| 6 | May 14, 2005 | Trinidad vs. Wright | The Wright Choice, The Wright Challenge | 510,000 | HBO |
| 7 | January 19, 2008 | Trinidad vs. Jones | Bring on the Titans | 500,000 | HBO |

== See also ==
- List of Puerto Ricans
- List of welterweight boxing champions
- List of light middleweight boxing champions
- List of middleweight boxing champions
- List of boxing triple champions
- List of Puerto Rican boxing world champions
- List of boxing families
- Sports in Puerto Rico
- African immigration to Puerto Rico

Sporting positions
Regional boxing titles
| Inaugural champion | Native American Boxing Council middleweight champion October 2, 2004 – May 2005; Vacated | Vacant Title next held by Mark Chang |
World boxing titles
| Preceded by Maurice Blocker | IBF welterweight champion June 19, 1993 – March 10, 2000; Vacated | Vacant Title next held by Vernon Forrest |
| Preceded by Oscar De La Hoya | WBC welterweight champion September 18, 1999 – March 20, 2000; Vacated | Vacant Title next held by Oscar De La Hoya |
| Preceded by David Reid | WBA light middleweight champion March 3, 2000 – May 29, 2001; Vacated | Vacant Title next held by Fernando Vargas |
| Preceded by Fernando Vargas | IBF light middleweight champion December 2, 2000 – May 20, 2001; Vacated | Vacant Title next held by Winky Wright |
| Preceded by William Joppy | WBA middleweight champion May 12, 2001 – September 29, 2001; Failed to win Super title | Succeeded by Bernard Hopkins as Super champion |
Awards
| Previous: Paulie Ayala | The Ring Fighter of the Year; 2000 | Next: Bernard Hopkins |
| Previous: Lennox Lewis | BWAA Fighter of the Year; 2000 | Next: Bernard Hopkins |
