= Kourosh Molaei =

Iranian boxer

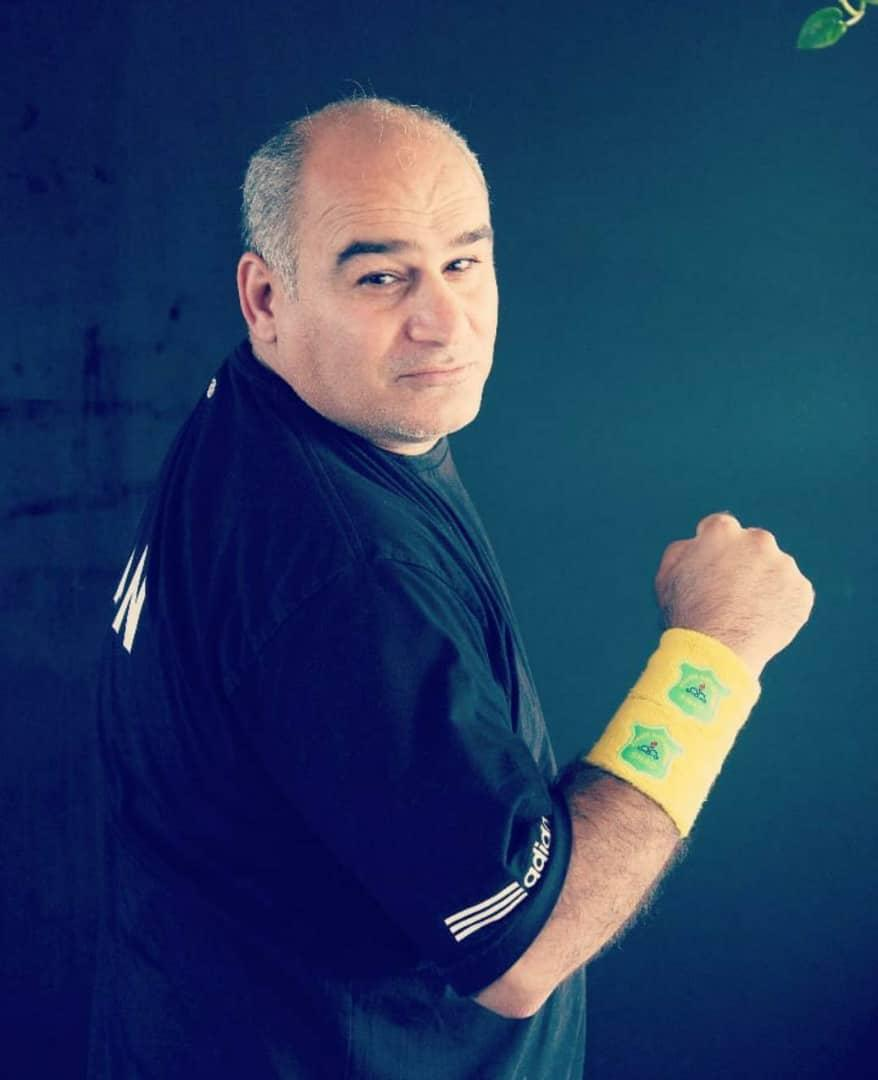

Personal information
- Full name: Kourosh Molaei Sefiddashti
- Nationality: Iranian
- Born: November 27, 1974 Abadan, Iran

Sport
- Sport: Boxing
- Weight class: 75 kg
Medal record
Asian Championships
Silver medal – second place	1995 Tashkent	75 kg

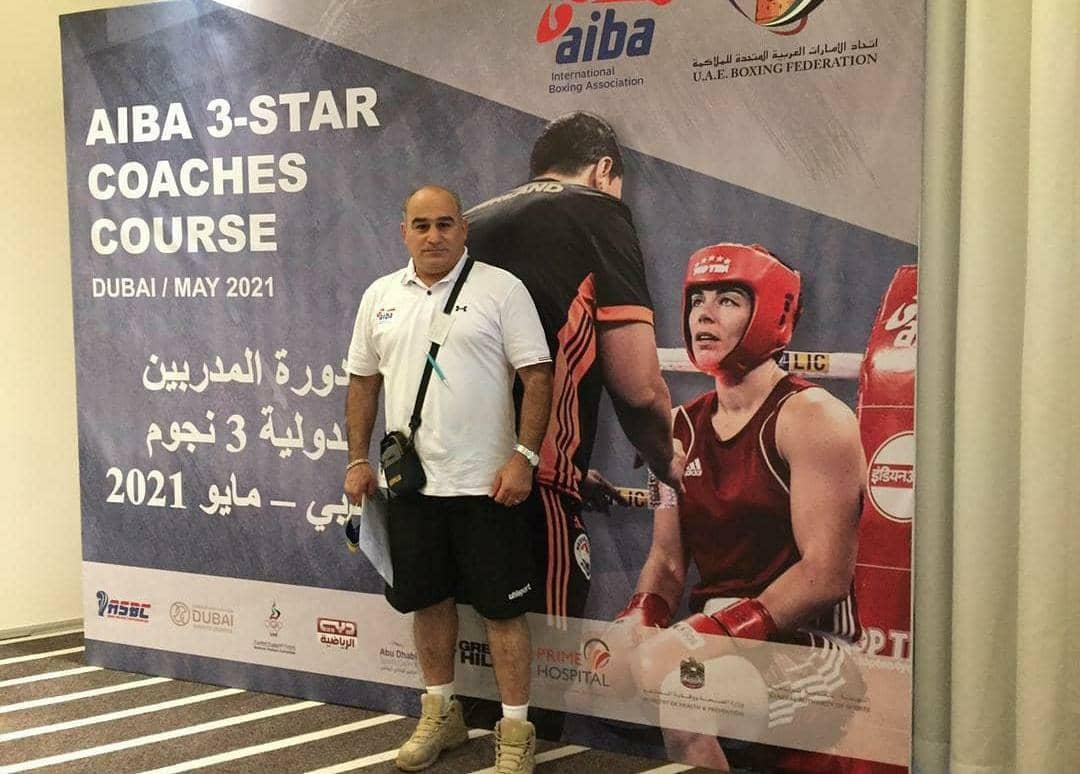

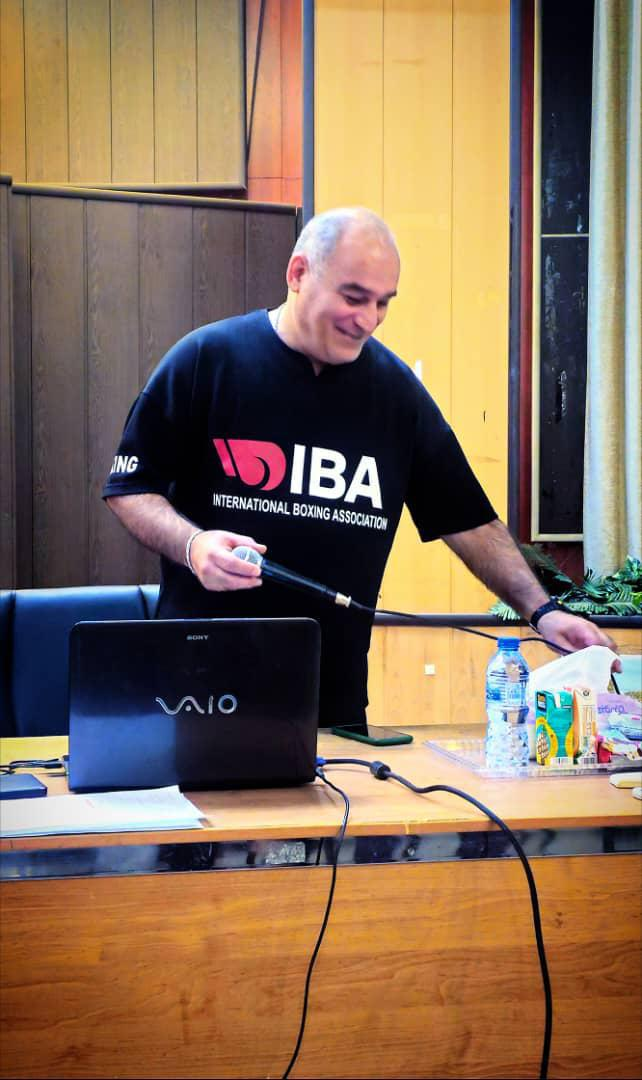

Kourosh Molaei Sefiddashti (Persian: کوروش ملایی سفیددشتی; born 27 November 1974 in Abadan, Iran) was an amateur boxer from Iran, who competed in the 1996 Summer Olympics in the middleweight (75 kg) division and lost in the first round to Rhoshii Wells of the United States.

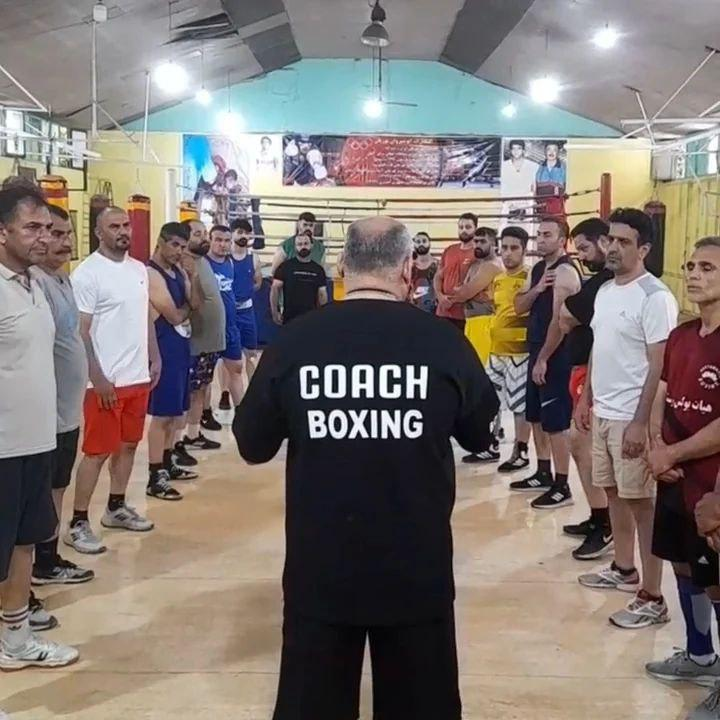
