= José Ricardo Rodrigues =

Brazilian boxer

Personal information
- Born: 5 April 1974 (age 50); São Paulo, Brazil

Sport
- Sport: Boxing

José Ricardo Rodrigues (born 5 April 1974) is a Brazilian boxer. He competed in the men's middleweight event at the 1996 Summer Olympics.
