= Nida Zuhal =

Turkish swimmer (born 1975)

Personal information
- Born: 24 June 1975 (age 51)

Sport
- Sport: Swimming

Nida Zuhal (born 24 June 1975) is a Turkish swimmer. She competed in two swimming events at the 1996 Summer Olympics.
