= Antonio Perugino =

Italian boxer

Personal information
- Nationality: Italian
- Born: 30 September 1973 (age 51); San Prisco, Italy

Sport
- Sport: Boxing

Antonio Perugino (born 30 September 1973) is an Italian boxer. He competed in the men's light middleweight event at the 1996 Summer Olympics.
