= Józef Gilewski =

Polish boxer

Personal information
- Nationality: Polish
- Born: 21 March 1971 (age 55) Zbrosławice, Poland

Sport
- Sport: Boxing

Józef Gilewski (born 21 March 1971) is a Polish boxer. He competed in the men's light middleweight event at the 1996 Summer Olympics.
