= Hirokuni Moto =

Japanese boxer (born 1970)

Hirokuni Moto (本 博国, Hirokuni Moto) (born March 9, 1970, in Kagoshima) is a retired male boxer from Japan. He represented his native country at the 1996 Summer Olympics in Atlanta, where he lost in the second round of the men's middleweight division (– 75 kg) by Poland’s Tomasz Borowski.
