= Ariel Hernández (boxer) =

Cuban boxer (born 1970 or 1972)

Personal information
- Full name: Ariel Hernández Azcuy
- Nationality: Cuba
- Born: May 3, 1970 (age 56) or April 8, 1972 (age 54) Guane, Pinar del Río, Cuba
- Height: 1.82 m (6 ft 0 in)
- Weight: 75 kg (165 lb)

Sport
- Sport: Boxing
- Weight class: Middleweight
Medal record
Men's Boxing
Representing Cuba
Olympic Games
Gold medal – first place	1992 Barcelona	Middleweight
Gold medal – first place	1996 Atlanta	Middleweight
World Amateur Championships
Gold medal – first place	1993 Tampere	Middleweight
Gold medal – first place	1995 Berlin	Middleweight
Silver medal – second place	1997 Budapest	Middleweight
Pan American Games
Gold medal – first place	1995 Mar del Plata	Middleweight
Central American and Caribbean Games
Gold medal – first place	1993 Ponce	Middleweight
Gold medal – first place	1998 Maracaibo	Middleweight
Goodwill Games
Gold medal – first place	1994 Saint Petersburg	Middleweight
Gold medal – first place	1998 New York	Middleweight

Ariel Hernández Azcuy (born May 3, 1970 or April 8, 1972) is a boxer from Cuba, who won two Olympic gold medals in the Middleweight division (71–75 kg); at the 1992 and 1996 Summer Olympics. He captured the world title at the 1995 World Amateur Boxing Championships in Berlin, just two months after having triumphed at the Pan American Games in Mar del Plata.

== Amateur accomplishments ==
- Twice Olympic Gold Medalist (Barcelona 1992, Atlanta 1996)
- Twice Junior World Champion (Bayamon 1989, Lima 1990)
- Twice World Champion (Tampere 1993, Berlin 1995)
- Seven-time Cuban National Champion (1992–1998)
- Twice Goodwill Games Champion (St Petersburg 1994, New York 1998)
- Twice World Championships Challenge Winner (Dublin 1994, Macon 1998)

=== Olympic results ===
1992

- Defeated Joseph Laryea (Ghana) 6–0
- Defeated Gilberto Brown (Virgin Islands) 13–2
- Defeated Sven Ottke (Germany) 14–6
- Defeated Lee Seung-Bae (South Korea) 14–1
- Defeated Chris Byrd (United States) 12–7

1993

- Defeated Akin Kuloglu (Turkey) 9-7 (Former Akaki Kakauridze Georgia born boxer)

1996

- Defeated Kabary Salem (Egypt) 11–2
- Defeated Sven Ottke (Germany) 5–0
- Defeated Alexander Lebziak (Russia) 15–8
- Defeated Rhoshii Wells (United States) 17–8
- Defeated Malik Beyleroğlu (Turkey) 11–3

=== Pan American Games results ===
1995

- Defeated Jorge Melo Silva (Brazil) RSC-1
- Defeated Alex James (Grenada) RSC-1
- Defeated Ronald Simms (United States) KO-1
- Defeated Ricardo Araneda (Chile) 13–0
