= Fred Aryee =

Nigerian footballer (born 1939)

Personal information
- Full name: Fred Seko Aryee
- Date of birth: 22 July 1939 (age 87)
- Place of birth: Accra, Gold Coast
- Date of death: October 2014
- Place of death: Accra, Ghana
- Height: 1.62 m (5 ft 4 in)
- Position: Midfielder

International career
Years	Team	Apps	(Gls)
- Nigeria

Fred Seko Aryee (born 22 July 1939) is a former footballer who played as a midfielder. Born in the Gold Coast, he represented the Nigerian national team. He competed in the men's tournament at the 1968 Summer Olympics.
