= Ashiakwei Aryee =

Ghanaian boxer

Personal information
- Nationality: Ghanaian
- Born: 2 January 1976 (age 49)

Sport
- Sport: Boxing

Ashiakwei Aryee (born 2 January 1976) is a Ghanaian boxer. He competed in the men's light middleweight event at the 1996 Summer Olympics.
