= Karim Tulaganov =

Uzbekistani boxer (born 1973)

Olympic medal record

Men's boxing
Bronze medal – third place	1996 Atlanta	Light middleweight

Karim Tulaganov (Карим Тулаганов; born August 27, 1973) is an Uzbek boxer. At the 1996 Summer Olympics he won a bronze medal in the men's Light Middleweight category, together with Yermakhan Ibraimov of Kazakhstan.

== Amateur career ==
Tulaganov Olympic results were:

- Defeated Oscar Gómez (Argentina) RSC 3 (2:50)
- Defeated Yared Wolde (Ethiopia) 13-9
- Defeated Rival Cadeau (Seychelles) RSC 1 (1:24)
- Lost to David Reid (United States) 4-12

== Pro career ==
Tulaganov turned pro in 2001 and had limited success. He compiled a career record of 1-3-0 and retired in 2002.
