= Pavol Polakovič =

Czech boxer

Personal information
- Nationality: Czech
- Born: 11 January 1974 (age 52) Smolenice, Czechoslovakia
- Height: 5 ft 10 1/2 in (179 cm)
- Weight: Cruiserweight; Heavyweight

Boxing career
- Stance: Southpaw

Boxing record
- Total fights: 24
- Wins: 13
- Win by KO: 1
- Losses: 11
Medal record
Men's amateur boxing
Representing Czech Republic
European Championships
Bronze medal – third place	1996 Vejle	Light-middleweight

Pavol Polakovič (born 11 January 1974) is a Slovak former professional boxer who competed from 2005 to 2016. He held the IBF International cruiserweight title in 2006. As an amateur, he won a bronze medal in the light-middleweight division while representing the Czech Republic at the 1996 European Championships in Vejle, Denmark.

== Personal life ==
He is of Roma (Gypsy) origin.
