= Sean Black =

Jamaican boxer (born 1970)

Personal information
- Nationality: Jamaican
- Born: 13 November 1970 (age 55)

Sport
- Sport: Boxing
Medal record
Representing Jamaica
Pan American Games
Bronze medal – third place	1999 Winnipeg	Light middleweight

Sean Black (born 13 November 1970) is a Jamaican boxer. He competed in the men's light middleweight event at the 1996 Summer Olympics.
