= Ľudovít Plachetka =

Slovak boxer

Personal information
- Nationality: Slovak
- Born: 27 March 1971 (age 55) Gelnica, Czechoslovakia

Sport
- Sport: Boxing

Ľudovít Plachetka (born 27 March 1971) is a Slovak boxer. He competed in the men's middleweight event at the 1996 Summer Olympics. In 1998, he was convicted of murder, and served nine years of a thirteen-year prison sentence. In 2012, he was found guilty of rape, and was sentenced to a further eight years in jail.

He has won one professional fight.
