= Roger Pettersson (boxer) =

Swedish boxer

Personal information
- Nationality: Swedish
- Born: 4 January 1973 (age 52); Borlänge, Sweden

Sport
- Sport: Boxing

Roger Pettersson (born 4 January 1973) is a Swedish boxer. He competed in the men's light middleweight event at the 1996 Summer Olympics.
