= Oscar Gómez (boxer) =

Argentine boxer

Oscar Edegardo Gómez (born July 21, 1975) is a retired male light-middleweight boxer from Argentina, who represented his native country at the 1996 Summer Olympics in Atlanta. There he was defeated in the first round of the men's light-middleweight division (– 71 kg) by Uzbekistan's eventual bronze medalist Karim Tulaganov after the referee stopped the contest in the third round.
