= Tomasz Borowski =

Polish boxer (born 1970)

Personal information
- Nationality: Polish
- Born: 15 April 1970 (age 55); Grójec, Poland

Sport
- Sport: Boxing

Tomasz Borowski (born 15 April 1970) is a Polish boxer. He competed in the men's middleweight event at the 1996 Summer Olympics.
