= Yared Woldemichael =

Ethiopian boxer (born 1968)

Personal information
- Nationality: Ethiopian
- Born: 1 January 1968 (age 57)

Sport
- Sport: Boxing

Yared Woldemichael (born 1 January 1968) is an Ethiopian boxer. He competed in the men's light middleweight event at the 1996 Summer Olympics.
