= Mohamed Marmouri =

Tunisian boxer (born 1967)

Mohamed salah Marmouri
Personal information
- Native name: محمد صالح المرموري
- Born: September 18, 1967 (age 58) tunisie
- Height: 170 cm (5 ft 7 in)
- Weight: 71 kg (157 lb)

Sport
- Country: Tunisia
- Sport: Boxing
Medal record
Men's Boxing
All-Africa Games
Gold medal – first place	1995 Harare	Light Middleweight
Bronze medal – third place	1999 Johannesburg	Light Middleweight
Mediterranean Games
Gold medal – first place	1997 Bari	Light Middleweight
Bronze medal – third place	2001 Tunis	Light Middleweight

Mohamed Salah Marmouri (Arabic: محمد صالح المرموري, September 18, 1967) is a retired amateur boxer from Tunisia. He represented his native North African country twice at the Summer Olympics: in 1996 and 2000. He won a bronze medal at the 2001 Mediterranean Games in Tunis, Tunisia and a gold medal at the 1995 All-Africa Games in Harare, Zimbabwe.

Marmouri won the gold medal in the light-middleweight (-71 kg) at the 1997 Mediterranean Games in Bari, Italy.
