= List of world champions in judo =

This is an incomplete list of World Champions in Judo.

== A ==
- Hifumi Abe
- Uta Abe
- Yago Abuladze
- Clarisse Agbegnenou
- Mayra Aguiar
- Yuri Alvear
- Takamasa Anai
- An Baul
- An Chang-rim
- Chizuru Arai
- Sarah Asahina

== B ==
- Bavuudorjiin Baasankhüü
- Larbi Benboudaoud
- Ingrid Berghmans
- Daria Bilodid
- Ákos Braun

== C ==
- Tiago Camilo
- Matthias Casse
- Margaret Castro
- Cho Gu-ham
- Lukhumi Chkhvimiani
- Choi Min-ho
- Luciano Corrêa

== D ==
- Christa Deguchi
- Frédéric Demontfaucon
- Ganbatyn Boldbaatar
- João Derly
- Brigitte Deydier
- Sumiya Dorjsuren
- David Douillet

== E ==
- Masashi Ebinuma
- Guillaume Elmont
- Gévrise Émane
- Noël van 't End
- Sumio Endo

== F ==
- Craig Fallon
- Jorge Fonseca
- Shōzō Fujii

== G ==
- Marie-Ève Gahié
- Anton Geesink
- Dennis van der Geest
- Yarden Gerbi
- Asley Gonzalez
- Gwak Dong-han

== H ==
- Ryunosuke Haga
- Shori Hamada
- Kayla Harrison
- Soichi Hashimoto
- Hidayat Heydarov
- Ruben Houkes

== I ==
- Ilias Iliadis
- Isao Inokuma
- Kōsei Inoue
- Hiroshi Izumi

== J ==
- Jeon Ki-young

== K ==
- Kokoro Kageura
- Daiki Kamikawa
- Majlinda Kelmendi
- Kim Jae-bum
- Kim Min-soo
- Jessica Klimkait
- Toshihiko Koga
- Ami Kondo
- Sergei Kosorotov
- Antal Kovács
- Lukáš Krpálek
- Rafał Kubacki
- Radomir Kovacevic

== L ==
- Inbar Lanir
- Lee Kyu-won
- Lee Won-hee
- Mariusz Linke
- Anis Lounifi

== M ==
- Nemanja Majdov
- Vitaliy Makarov
- Madeleine Malonga
- Elkhan Mammadov
- Joshiro Maruyama
- Barbara Matić
- Kaori Matsumoto
- Alexander Mikhaylin
- Arash Miresmaeili
- Saeid Mollaei
- Yasuyuki Muneta
- Sagi Muki

== N ==
- Takanori Nagase
- Misato Nakamura
- Riki Nakaya
- Paweł Nastula
- Tadahiro Nomura

== O ==
- Liliko Ogasawara
- Naoya Ogawa
- Shohei Ono
- Idalys Ortiz

== P ==
- Paula Pareto
- Jimmy Pedro
- Loïc Pietri

== Q ==
- Udo Quellmalz

== R ==
- Thierry Rey
- Teddy Riner
- Wim Ruska

== S ==
- Hitoshi Saito
- Peter Seisenbacher
- Lasha Shavdatuashvili
- Nikoloz Sherazadishvili
- Shinichi Shinohara
- Ai Shishime
- Yeldos Smetov
- Rishod Sobirov
- Akira Sone
- Anita Staps
- Keiji Suzuki

== T ==
- Naohisa Takato
- Avtandil Tchrikishvili
- Funa Tonaki
- Stéphane Traineau
- Tina Trstenjak
- Khashbaataryn Tsagaanbaatar
- Irakli Tsirekidze
- Natsumi Tsunoda
- Guram Tushishvili

== U ==
- Nae Udaka
- Mami Umeki

== V ==
- Marhinde Verkerk

== W ==
- Anna-Maria Wagner
- Wang Ki-chun
- Florian Wanner
- Alexander Wieczerzak
- Aaron Wolf

== Y ==
- Yasuhiro Yamashita
- Hidehiko Yoshida
- Tsukasa Yoshida
- Yu Song
