= Judo at the 1993 East Asian Games =

Judo competition

Judo Judo at the 1993 East Asian Games
- Venue: Jiading Gymnasium
- Location: Shanghai, China
- Dates: 14-17 May 1993

The Judo competition at the 1993 East Asian Games was contested in eight weight classes, eight each for men and women.

This competition was held at Jiading Gymnasium (Chinese: 嘉定体育馆), from May 14 to 17, 1993. South Korea dominated the medals table, with gold in 7 events, followed by five gold medals for China and four for Japan.

== Medal overview ==
=== Men's events ===
Event	Gold	Silver	Bronze
Extra-lightweight (60 kg)	Lim Byung-Ki (KOR)	Hang H. G. (PRK)	M. D (MGL)
Extra-lightweight (60 kg)	Lim Byung-Ki (KOR)	Hang H. G. (PRK)	Tadashi Itakausu (JPN)
Half-lightweight (65 kg)	Yukimasa Nakamura (JPN)	Yoon Hyun (KOR)	Hao Lang (CHN)
Half-lightweight (65 kg)	Yukimasa Nakamura (JPN)	Yoon Hyun (KOR)	So S. (PRK)
Lightweight (71 kg)	Daisuke Hideshima (JPN)	Yu Zhijan (CHN)	Chung Hoon (KOR)
Lightweight (71 kg)	Daisuke Hideshima (JPN)	Yu Zhijan (CHN)	Park Y. (PRK)
Half-middleweight (78 kg)	Jeon Ki-Young (KOR)	D. Dorjbat (MGL)	Chang I. H. (PRK)
Half-middleweight (78 kg)	Jeon Ki-Young (KOR)	D. Dorjbat (MGL)	Lin Mingdiao (TPE)
Middleweight (86 kg)	Masaru Tanabe (JPN)	Baik Woo-Youl (KOR)	Wang Nan (CHN)
Middleweight (86 kg)	Masaru Tanabe (JPN)	Baik Woo-Youl (KOR)	T. T (MGL)
Half-heavyweight (95 kg)	Lee Jung-Young (KOR)	Michiaki Kamochi (JPN)	T. B (MGL)
Half-heavyweight (95 kg)	Lee Jung-Young (KOR)	Michiaki Kamochi (JPN)	Jiang Fabin (CHN)
Heavyweight (+95 kg)	Kim Kun-Soo (KOR)	Chang H. B. (PRK)	B. Badmaanyambuu (MGL)
Heavyweight (+95 kg)	Kim Kun-Soo (KOR)	Chang H. B. (PRK)	Tian Yong (CHN)
Openweight	Koichiro Mitani (JPN)	Wen Changlin (CHN)	Yu (KOR)
Openweight	Koichiro Mitani (JPN)	Wen Changlin (CHN)	O. Baljinnima (MGL)

=== Women's events ===
Event	Gold	Silver	Bronze
Extra-lightweight (48 kg)	Ryoko Tamura (JPN)	Tang Lihong (CHN)	Ri S. M. (PRK)
Extra-lightweight (48 kg)	Ryoko Tamura (JPN)	Tang Lihong (CHN)	Kim So-ra (KOR)
Half-lightweight (52 kg)	Hao Wenying (CHN)	Hyun Sook-hee (KOR)	Noriko Mizoguchi (JPN)
Half-lightweight (52 kg)	Hao Wenying (CHN)	Hyun Sook-hee (KOR)	Ceng Ai-Chun (TPE)
Lightweight (56 kg)	Jung Sun-yong (KOR)	Wang Jin (CHN)	Chiyori Tateno (JPN)
Lightweight (56 kg)	Jung Sun-yong (KOR)	Wang Jin (CHN)	Ri Y. B. (PRK)
Half-middleweight (61 kg)	Zhang Di (CHN)	Hiroko Kitazume (JPN)	C. O (MGL)
Half-middleweight (61 kg)	Zhang Di (CHN)	Hiroko Kitazume (JPN)	Jung Sung-sook (KOR)
Middleweight (66 kg)	Cho Min-sun (KOR)	Natsuko Sano (JPN)	Wu Mei-Ling (TPE)
Middleweight (66 kg)	Cho Min-sun (KOR)	Natsuko Sano (JPN)	Ao Deng (CHN)
Half-heavyweight (72 kg)	Kim Mi-jung (KOR)	Leng Chunhui (CHN)	Sambuu Dashdulam (MGL)
Half-heavyweight (72 kg)	Kim Mi-jung (KOR)	Leng Chunhui (CHN)	Saki Yoshida (JPN)
Heavyweight (+72 kg)	Yin Zhang (CHN)	Moon Ji-yoon (KOR)	Noriko Anno (JPN)
Heavyweight (+72 kg)	Yin Zhang (CHN)	Moon Ji-yoon (KOR)	Rim C. S. (PRK)
Openweight	Qiao Yanmin (CHN)	Kaori Suzuki (JPN)	Shon Hyun-me (KOR)
Openweight	Qiao Yanmin (CHN)	Kaori Suzuki (JPN)	none

=== Medals table ===
Rank	Nation	Gold	Silver	Bronze	Total
1	South Korea	7	4	5	16
2	Japan	5	4	5	14
3	China	4	5	5	14
4	North Korea	0	2	6	8
5	Mongolia	0	1	7	8
6	Chinese Taipei	0	0	3	3
Totals (6 entries)		16	16	31	63

== Sources ==
- 近代柔道 1993年7月号 [特集]第1回東アジア競技大会柔道競技 -近柔特派員Sの大会観戦レポート-. Baseball Magazine Sha Co., Ltd. 1993-07-20.
