= David Douillet =

French judoka & politician (born 1969)

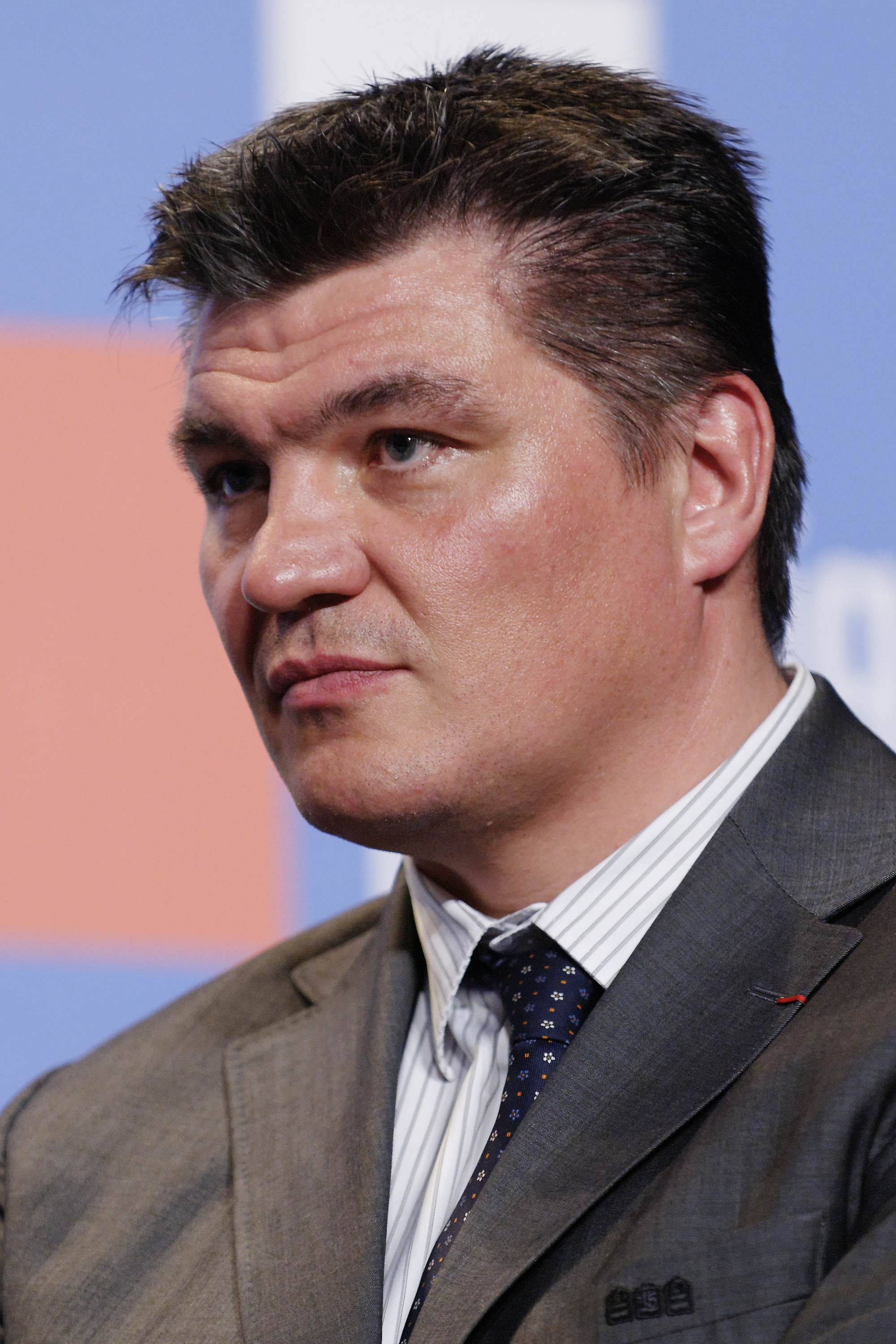

Personal information
- Born: 17 February 1969 (age 57)
- Occupation: Judoka
- Height: 1.96 m (6 ft 5 in)
- Weight: 125 kg (276 lb)

Sport
- Country: France
- Sport: Judo
- Weight class: +100 kg

Achievements and titles
- Olympic Games: (gold) (1996, 2000)
- World Champ.: (gold) (1993, 1995, 1995, 1997)
- European Champ.: (gold) (1994)
Medal record
Men's judo
Representing France
Olympic Games
Gold medal – first place	1996 Atlanta	+95 kg
Gold medal – first place	2000 Sydney	+100 kg
Bronze medal – third place	1992 Barcelona	+95 kg
World Championships
Gold medal – first place	1993 Hamilton	+95 kg
Gold medal – first place	1995 Chiba	+95 kg
Gold medal – first place	1995 Chiba	Open
Gold medal – first place	1997 Paris	+95 kg
European Championships
Gold medal – first place	1994 Gdansk	+95 kg
Silver medal – second place	1993 Athens	+95 kg
Bronze medal – third place	1991 Prague	+95 kg
Bronze medal – third place	1992 Paris	+95 kg
European Junior Championships
Bronze medal – third place	1989 Athens	+95 kg

Profile at external databases
- IJF: 14181
- JudoInside.com: 2467
- Updated on 1 June 2023

David Donald Hubert Roger Douillet (French: [david dɔnald ybɛʁ ʁɔʒe dujɛ]; born 17 February 1969, Rouen) is a French politician and retired judoka.

Douillet won two consecutive gold medals at the 1996 and 2000 Summer Olympics in Atlanta and Sydney competing in the heavyweight division. He is also a four-time judo world champion and one-time European champion. These achievements make him one of the most decorated judoka in history. After his sporting career, he was involved alongside Bernadette Chirac in the charity Opération Pièces Jaunes. He also became a consulting sportsman for Canal+. He was elected deputy to the French National Assembly on 18 October 2009 and on 26 September 2011 became the new Sports Minister until May 2012.

== Sporting career ==
=== Early career ===
David Douillet began judo at age 11, in the commune of Neufchâtel-en-Bray, near his birthplace of Rouen. Having exceptional physical size for someone his age (1,80 m and 80 kg), he was instructed by Jacques Lemaître who taught him the rudiments of the sport. Quickly becoming attracted to the Japanese martial art, he distinguished himself on the tatamis, and thanks to his good academic results, integrated the study of the sport at the school Victor et Hélène Basch, near the University of Rennes. In 1986, when Douillet was 17, he was noticed during a demonstration by Jean-Luc Rougé who brought him into the INSEP.

He was already heads above the others, and after what was seen on the mat, I immediately reserved a place for him; at INSEP, the center of the elite of the French athletics.

— Jean-Luc Rougé

Consequently, the young David could devote himself to his passion, while continuing his education in the Paris region, Maisons-Alfort, and involving himself at the INSEP facility of Bois de Vincennes, the coterie of elite and promising French judokas. There, he met his idol Fabien Canu, double world champion in 1987 and 1989. With strength and drive, Douillet obtained his first awards in his age class. In 1988, he became French junior champion, then obtained fifth place at the European championships. Rising again to the top of the national standings in 1989, he captured the European bronze medal in Athens, again as a junior.

=== Among the world elite ===
After a period of adaptation, he won his first Senior French championship in 1991, imposing himself in the final against Georges Mathonnet, another hope for French judo, born two years before Douillet. Thanks to this first national title, David qualified for his first senior European championships in Prague, where he finished in third place, a real achievement for a 22-year-old at his first selection. A few weeks later, he disputed the military world championships, where he earned two medals. At the beginning of 1992, he successfully defended his national title in the heavyweight category. Selected for the European Championships, which were held in Paris, in May 1992, he shone in a decisive competition obtaining a qualification for the Barcelona 1992 Summer Olympics, which took place in July of the same year: during these European championships, he obtained the bronze medal, synonymous with an Olympic ticket for Spain.

He faced a hard bracket during the Olympic tournament with the German Henry Stöhr (Olympic vice-champion in 1988), and the Japanese Naoya Ogawa (quadruple world champion). Not succeeding in carrying a frank attack on the Frenchman, Stöhr, neutralized, was disqualified for uncombativeness. However, a movement of the legs by Ogawa, in the next fight, put Douillet ippon, and the French judoka out for the gold medal race. He could, however, still hope for bronze. Facing the Cuban Franck Moreno Garcia, in the bout for third place, the Frenchman imposed himself. The judoka won the bronze medal at 23 years old.

=== World and European achievements ===
==== First International Games ====
In search of confirmation after his Olympic bronze medal, David Douillet ambitiously approached his first participation in a world championship. It was in Hamilton, Ontario, that the French judoka hoped to carry out a winning performance. Having defeated several experienced judokas, like the Polish Rafał Kubacki, he finally beat the Olympic champion and champion of Europe David Khakhaleishvili, then ranked #1 in the world and logical favourite of the tournament. He then took his revenge on the Georgian who, a few months earlier, had beaten him at the European championships. Thanks to this title acquired at 24 years, he becomes the first French world champion in this weight class, regarded by some as the premier category of judo. It is in this same weight class that he gained his first European title the following year in the 1994 European Judo Championships at Gdańsk, Poland, by defeating Rafał Kubacki in the final bout.

==== Chiba 1995: for the double ====
In view of the Atlanta 1996 Summer Olympics, the 1995 World Judo Championships in Chiba, Japan constituted an obligatory preparatory stage to participate in the American Olympics. A good performance being a great step towards an Olympic medal, Douillet was planning to defend his world title gained two years earlier in Canada. But this time, he competed at the same time in his weight class (heavyweight, in +95 kg) and in the open category (a category without weight limit). In the first, the Frenchman made a display of his class, by winning each of his fights by ippon. Having beaten the Japanese quadruple world champion Naoya Ogawa, then the Spaniard Ernesto Pérez in the semi-final, he finally triumphed over the German Frank Möller by ippon, after less than 2 minutes of fighting, and retained his title.

Three days later, Douillet repeated his performance in the open category, by beating in the final the Russian Sergei Kossorotov by an pin. Thanks to the heavyweight title, he became the second Frenchman to preserve his world title after Fabien Canu in 1980, and placed himself as the legitimate favourite for the Olympic Games. Furthermore, with his double win, Douillet entered the history books of judo, becoming the third judoka to carry out this exploit after Yasuhiro Yamashita in 1981 and Naoya Ogawa in 1989. Carrying out this exploit in Japan, and equalling the performances of two native stars, made him an instant icon in Japan.

=== Dedication ===
==== Olympic title ====
Selected for Atlanta the 1996 Summer Olympics, he was the favourite due to the three world titles won since his inaugural Olympic participation in 1992. Douillet passed the first matches without difficulties by eliminating the Belgian Van Barneveld, the Luxembourger Müller, and the Austrian Krieger. The Frenchman then fought the semi-final against the Japanese Naoya Ogawa, who had beaten him at the same stage of the 1992 Olympic tournament. This tight fight, styled as the "final before the final" by the French, was won by Douillet, who punched his ticket for the Olympic final against the Spaniard Ernesto Pérez Lobo. Against a judoka that he had already overcome during the last world championships, the world champion took the contest in hand, and, thanks to an Uchi-mata (mowing by the interior of the thigh), obtained an irreversible advantage which enabled him to take the Olympic title. Thus, he became the first French judoka to win the gold medal in the reigning category of judo, and the fourth Olympic champion to do it within all categories. During the award ceremony it was the Dutch Anton Geesink, Olympic champion in 1964, who gave the medal to Douillet.

Douillet had to wait until 1997 to claim his proper Olympic medal that he won the previous year. The American organizers of the Atlanta Games had reversed the ceremonies of handing-over of the medals for the male and female competitions. Thus Dutch Anton Geesink, Olympic champion of the Open category in 1964, gave to the French judoka the medal intended for the Chinese judokate Fuming Sun, Olympic champion of the women heavyweights. It was in Paris, at the time of the 1997 World Judo Championships, that the various actors were brought together once again to receive the right medals.

==== Between victories and injuries ====
On 30 September 1996, two months after the Olympic title captured in Atlanta, Douillet was seriously injured in the calf and the right shoulder in a motorbike accident. The long convalescence, and eight months of rehabilitation, actually reinvigorated the Frenchman and gave him new motivation after his gold medal:

This accident rekindled my desire. After Atlanta, I had the impression of having made it. I had gained a lot... Then, after the accident, I had a new challenge: to become again first an athlete, then a performing athlete.

Thus, he returned gradually to his ideal shape (approximately 125 kg) and joined again the competition, at the time of the Mediterranean Games, which took place in June 1997 in Bari, Italy. He made a good show and earned a medal by defeating the European champion, Selim Tataroğlu. More than this victory, it was the prospect of the world championships, organized in Paris, which intensified Douillet's return to the foreground. The judoka carried out serious preparations in hopes of obtaining a fourth world title. In the competition, Douillet qualified for the final by defeating once again the Turkish Selim Tataroğlu in the semi-finals. In the finals, he beat the Japanese Shinichi Shinohara by disqualification. This victory, giving him a third world crown (fourth with the Open title in 1995), tied Douillet with another Japanese athlete, Yasuhiro Yamashita, and closed a difficult post-Atlanta period marked not only by his motorbike accident, but also by financial problems related to bad investments. However, a pain in the shoulder forced him to withdraw once again from the tatamis after the world championship in Paris, and in August 1998, he was the victim of a distortion of the wrist, and withdrew from competition for several months.

=== Return of "Goliath" ===
==== Difficult return to competition ====
In spite of almost two years of inactivity in competition, he was selected for the 1999 European Judo Championships in Bratislava. He had a sub-par performance there, taking only seventh place, letting his main competitors gain the podium. Nevertheless, the Frenchman started his preparation for a historic second Olympic title at the Sydney 2000 Summer Olympics. The principal stage of this preparation was the participation in the 1999 World Judo Championships in Birmingham. However, Douillet underwent a disappointment, being forced to withdraw two days before the beginning of the competition because of a groin strain. The months that followed were troubled by new physical problems with his back. While this was not the ideal way to prepare for his return, one and half months before the Olympic event he participated in a competition in Bonn, where he was beaten in the semi-final by the German Frank Möller and took third place. This was a competition in his road back to high-level, a comeback considered encouraging by his trainer Marc Alexandre, who did not entirely hide his concerns, however, due to the delay in his preparation caused by David's repetitive injuries.

==== Historic double ====
In spite of the doubts concerning his physical condition, Douillet was present in Sydney, Australia, for the opening ceremonies of the 2000 Summer Olympics. Even more, the judoka was nominated to be the flag carrier of the French delegation by the CNOSF (Olympic and sporting National committee French), thus succeeding the athlete Marie-José Pérec.

On 22 September 2000, the judo tournament started, and Douillet entered the heavyweight competition to try to become the most titled Judoka in history. After winning his first match on a no-show from the Venezuelan Douglas Cardozo (he was not present at the weighing before the competition), the Frenchman faced the Turk Selim Tataroğlu, recent vice-champion of Europe (Open), and multiple medal-holder in the World Judo Championships. The Frenchman, however, beat him by ippon thanks to an o-uchi-gari (great interior mowing), and qualified for the quarter-finals where he faced the Belgian Harry van Barneveld, bronze medal winner four years before in Atlanta. Again Douillet passed this round thanks to the disqualification of his adversary (hansoku-make). Next, he went to fight against the Estonian Indrek Pertelson with a shot at the final. Pertelson, the world vice-champion, was quickly dispatched by the Frenchman on an ippon in less one minute.

In the final, his adversary was the Japanese Shinichi Shinohara, double champion of the world in 1999. That game is seen as a revenge of the 1997 World Judo Championships finals, where Douillet had beaten the Japanese heavyweight. The confrontation between the two judokas was extremely tactical, and it was only after one and a half minutes that the Frenchman took the lead thanks to a mowing by the interior of the thigh (uchi-subdued). The referee decision allotted a yuko to Douillet, a decision disputed by Shinohara, who argued that he dodged and then countered the Frenchman. However, the head referee was not moved, and Shinohara did not manage to make up for this lost time. After five minutes of fight, Douillet was finally able to win his second Olympic gold medal. This was also a victory for the Judo history books as he became the fighter with the most international titles. With six major international titles (2 Olympic titles, 4 world titles), he passed the Japanese Yasuhiro Yamashita (1 Olympic title, 4 world titles) who won his titles in the seventies. The Olympic tournament in Sydney, however, marked the end of the road for the French judoka, who immediately announced his retirement after the competition, he won 88 matches and lost 21.

== Retirement ==
=== Legacy ===
==== On judo ====
The French judoka is no longer the record Olympic title-holder, since the Japanese Tadahiro Nomura won his third consecutive title in 2004 in Athens. However, he retains a dominating place at the top of the world's judo. He is one of the five male judokas (except Nomura) to have gained two Olympic titles, but thanks to his bronze medal obtained in 1992 in Barcelona, he is the only one besides Nomura and Angelo Parisi to have gained three Olympic medals. With regard to the World Judo Championships, Douillet is now the 3rd most titled judoka along with three other Japanese athletes. He is also one of the only two judokas who own three world champion titles in the heavyweight class, the other being Yasuhiro Yamashita (both are far behind Teddy Riner's 7 titles). These achievements make the Frenchman one of the greatest judoka in history.

==== On French sport ====
Thanks to his second Olympic title acquired in Sydney, he was proclaimed for the second time in 2000 Champion of the champions français by the French sporting daily newspaper L'Équipe. This recognition is all the more remarkable because it came ahead of both Brahim Asloum, the first French Olympic champion of boxing since 1936, and the leader of the France national football team Zinedine Zidane, who just won the European championship.

In 2005, he was one of the flag carriers for the unsuccessful bid of Paris 2012 for the organization of the 2012 Summer Olympics. Douillet also fought against doping and joined, in 1999, the council of martial arts and prevention against doping. Recognized on the international scene, he is one of the forty sporting personalities, members of the academy, of the Laureus World Awards' Sports since its founding in 1999.

=== A popular sportsman ===
Generous as a sportsman, Douillet put his popularity at the service of charitable operations. Close to the Chirac couple, he became godfather of the charity operation "Operation Yellow Coins" with then First French lady Bernadette Chirac. Each year David "drives" an SNCF TGV La Poste to go and collect funds for his "operation pieces jaunes", and he is the main sponsor, via public appearances, for this operation. In 1996 he started the foundation of the hospitals of Paris to improve the daily life of hospitalized children and teenagers. In addition, after his second Olympic title, he was named a UNESCO ambassador for youth in 2001. His medals and his generosity are held in high regard amongst the French, who ranked him the second most popular personality in France. Sometimes invited onto television programs, the judoka has his puppet with Les Guignols de l'info, a popular satirical broadcast on Canal+.

=== Retirement ===
Having concluded his competitive career, Douillet ventured into business activities. In 1997, Travelsport, a travel agency where he was a shareholder, declared bankruptcy. Soon afterward, he won his fourth World Championship. Upon winning his second Olympic gold medal, Douillet concluded various commercial deals. After collaborating with TV production companies, he created brand partnerships for different types of products, such as sport equipment and outdoor adventure gear, a line of judo uniforms with his personal brand DD, and a video game called David Douillet Judo.

On television, after a short passage on French television, he joined Canal+ where he is regularly present as a sporting consultant when international Judo events are broadcast. He also participates in the preparation of rebroadcasts of events like the Olympic Games, or the 24 Hours of Le Mans, on premium cable television. Moreover, he appears occasionally in commercials. While he is currently focusing on the business side of his career, he has not entirely given up on judo: he was named to the management committee of the French federation of judo in 2005.

== Television ==
David Douillet took part in Season 12 of the French adaptation of "Dancing with the Stars" where he was teamed up with professional dancer Katrina Patchett. Unfortunately, their time on the show was short-lived, as they were both eliminated during the first live episode on September 9, 2022.

== Politics ==
David Douillet was a candidate for the UMP center-right political party in the by-election of 11 and 18 October 2009 in the 12th constituency of the Yvelines department. He won 52,10% of the ballots cast and was elected member of the National Assembly. In the 2010 French regional elections, he was elected in the Council of Île-de-France.

On 29 June 2011, Douillet was appointed Secretary of State in charge of French nationals abroad in the François Fillon cabinet. On 26 September 2011, he was appointed Minister of Sports, a mandate that lasted until the next presidential elections that took place in May 2012.

== Medals ==
=== Olympic Games ===
- Olympic Games of 1992: Barcelona (Spain):
  - Bronze medal in the category of +95 kg (heavyweight).
- Olympic Games of 1996: Atlanta (United States):
  - Gold Medal in the category of +95 kg (heavyweight).
- Olympic Games of 2000: Sydney (Australia):
  - Gold Medal in the category of +100 kg (heavyweight).

=== Various ===
- By teams:
  - World cup teams in 1994.
  - Champion of Europe teams in 1993.
- In club
  - 1995 European Club Cup with PSG Judo
- International events:
  - Gold Medal at the 1997 Mediterranean Games organized in Bari, Italy.
  - Gold Medal at the Plays of the Francophonie 1994 organized with Paris (France).
- World cup:
  - 2 podiums at the Tournament of Paris (3rd in 1993, 2nd in 1995).
- Championships of France:
  - 2 championships of France seniors in 1991 and 1992.
- Juniors:
  - Bronze medal in the heavyweight class (+95 kg) at the 1989 European Junior Championships

Olympic Games
Preceded by Marie-José Pérec	Flagbearer for France; Sydney 2000	Succeeded by Jackson Richardson
