= 1990 World Judo Juniors Championships =

Judo competition

Judo 1990 World Judo Juniors Championships
- Location: Dijon, France
- Dates: 30 March – 1 April 1990

Competition at external databases
- Links: JudoInside

The 1990 World Judo Juniors Championships was an edition of the World Judo Juniors Championships, organised by the International Judo Federation. It was held in Dijon, France from 26 to 29 October 2000.

== Men's events ==
Event	Gold	Silver	Bronze
Extra-lightweight (−60 kg)	Nikolay Ozhegin (URS)	Israel Hernández (CUB)	Naoya Uchimura (JPN)
Extra-lightweight (−60 kg)	Nikolay Ozhegin (URS)	Israel Hernández (CUB)	Byung-Ki Lim (KOR)
Half-lightweight (−65 kg)	Yukimasa Nakamura (JPN)	Jens Altendorf (GDR)	Vladimir Drachko (URS)
Half-lightweight (−65 kg)	Yukimasa Nakamura (JPN)	Jens Altendorf (GDR)	Jimmy Pedro (USA)
Lightweight (−71 kg)	Vladimir Dgebuadze (URS)	Shay-Oren Smadga (ISR)	Patrick Reiter (AUT)
Lightweight (−71 kg)	Vladimir Dgebuadze (URS)	Shay-Oren Smadga (ISR)	Daisuke Hideshima (JPN)
Half-middleweight (−78 kg)	Marko Spittka (GDR)	Katsuyoshi Honda (JPN)	Woo-Ryul Baik (KOR)
Half-middleweight (−78 kg)	Marko Spittka (GDR)	Katsuyoshi Honda (JPN)	Ruslan Mazaev (URS)
Middleweight (−86 kg)	Tamaz Saakashvili (FRA)	Marcos Daud (BRA)	Yoshio Nakamura (JPN)
Middleweight (−86 kg)	Tamaz Saakashvili (FRA)	Marcos Daud (BRA)	Adrian Croitoru (ROU)
Half-heavyweight (−95 kg)	Mike Hax (GDR)	Ho-Min Oh (KOR)	Indrek Pertelson (URS)
Half-heavyweight (−95 kg)	Mike Hax (GDR)	Ho-Min Oh (KOR)	Anton Koevoet (NED)
Heavyweight (+95 kg)	Zaza Dabrundashvili (URS)	Keiji Iwata (JPN)	Dirk Radack (FRG)
Heavyweight (+95 kg)	Zaza Dabrundashvili (URS)	Keiji Iwata (JPN)	Frank Moeller (GDR)

== Women's events ==
Event	Gold	Silver	Bronze
Extra-lightweight (−48 kg)	Legna Verdecia (CUB)	Bozena Strzalkowska (POL)	Elena Chelova (URS)
Extra-lightweight (−48 kg)	Legna Verdecia (CUB)	Bozena Strzalkowska (POL)	Nancy van Stokkum (NED)
Half-lightweight (−52 kg)	Christel Deliège (BEL)	Noriko Narazaki (JPN)	Michele Brown (GBR)
Half-lightweight (−52 kg)	Christel Deliège (BEL)	Noriko Narazaki (JPN)	Yu-Ping Chou (TPE)
Lightweight (−56 kg)	Min-Sun Cho (KOR)	Hsiao Feng Tseng (TPE)	Guelisan Intas (TUR)
Lightweight (−56 kg)	Min-Sun Cho (KOR)	Hsiao Feng Tseng (TPE)	Pascale Mainville (CAN)
Half-middleweight (−61 kg)	Karine Petit (FRA)	Irena Tokarz (POL)	Michaela Vernerova (TCH)
Half-middleweight (−61 kg)	Karine Petit (FRA)	Irena Tokarz (POL)	Tatyana Bogomyakova (URS)
Middleweight (−66 kg)	Kate Howey (GBR)	Yukiko Abe (JPN)	Katarzyna Juszczak (POL)
Middleweight (−66 kg)	Kate Howey (GBR)	Yukiko Abe (JPN)	Liliko Ogasawara (USA)
Half-heavyweight (−72 kg)	Ulla Werbrouck (BEL)	Marscha Broeders (NED)	Simona Richter (ROU)
Half-heavyweight (−72 kg)	Ulla Werbrouck (BEL)	Marscha Broeders (NED)	Chloe Cowen (GBR)
Heavyweight (+72 kg)	Daima Beltrán (CUB)	Monique van der Lee (NED)	Gaëlle Potel (FRA)
Heavyweight (+72 kg)	Daima Beltrán (CUB)	Monique van der Lee (NED)	Donata Burgatta (ITA)

== Medal table ==
* Host nation (France)

Rank	Nation	Gold	Silver	Bronze	Total
1	Soviet Union (URS)	3	0	5	8
2	East Germany (GDR)	2	1	1	4
3	Cuba (CUB)	2	1	0	3
4	France (FRA)	2	0	1	3
5	Belgium (BEL)	2	0	0	2
6	Japan (JPN)	1	4	3	8
7	South Korea (KOR)	1	1	2	4
8	Great Britain (GBR)	1	0	2	3
9	Netherlands (NED)	0	2	2	4
10	Poland (POL)	0	2	1	3
11	Chinese Taipei (TPE)	0	1	1	2
12	Brazil (BRA)	0	1	0	1
12	Israel (ISR)	0	1	0	1
14	Romania (ROU)	0	0	2	2
14	United States (USA)	0	0	2	2
16	Austria (AUT)	0	0	1	1
16	Canada (CAN)	0	0	1	1
16	Czechoslovakia (TCH)	0	0	1	1
16	Italy (ITA)	0	0	1	1
16	Turkey (TUR)	0	0	1	1
16	West Germany (FRG)	0	0	1	1
Totals (21 entries)		14	14	28	56
