= Yoshio Nakamura =

Japanese judoka (born 1970)

Medal record

Men's Judo

Representing Japan

World Championships
Gold medal – first place	1993 Hamilton	-86 kg
Bronze medal – third place	1997 Paris	-95 kg

Asian Games
Gold medal – first place	1994 Hiroshima	-86 kg
Silver medal – second place	1998 Bangkok	-95 kg

Asian Championships
Gold medal – first place	1991 Osaka	-86 kg

East Asian Games
Silver medal – second place	1997 Busan	-95 kg

Yoshio Nakamura (中村 佳央, Nakamura Yoshio; born 22 October 1970) is a retired Japanese judoka, and former world champion. His younger brothers, Yukimasa and Kenzo are also former world champions.

Nakamura is from Fukuoka, Fukuoka. He began Judo at the age of 3rd grader. After graduation from Tokai University, He belonged to Asahi Kasei.

He won the gold medal in the -86 kg weight class at the 1993 World Judo Championships.

In 1995, after All-Japan Championships, he moved up in weight class, from -86 kg to -95 kg.

He finished in seventh place in the -95 kg weight class at the Olympic Games in 1996 and won the bronze medal in the -95 kg weight class at the World Championships in 1997.

Nakamura was good at Uchimata, Ōuchi gari, Harai goshi and especially Newaza. He is well known that he destroyed Hirotaka Okada's elbow by Juji-gatame at the All-Japan selected championships in 1994. He was also known as a rival of Hidehiko Yoshida.

In July 2004, after All-Japan Businessgroup Championships, Nakamura retired.

As of 2010, he has coached at Asahi Kasei since 2001. Among his pupil are world champion Hiroshi Izumi, Masato Uchishiba and so on.
