= 1995 World Judo Championships =

Judo competition

Judo 1995 World Judo Championships
- Venue: Makuhari Messe
- Location: Chiba, Japan
- Dates: 28 September – 1 October 1995
- Competitors: 627 from 100 nations

Competition at external databases
- Links: IJF • JudoInside

The 1995 World Judo Championships were the 19th edition of the World Judo Championships, and were held in Chiba, Japan in 1995.

== Medal overview ==
=== Men ===
Event	Gold	Silver	Bronze
Extra-lightweight (60 kg)	Nikolay Ozhegin (RUS)	Georgi Vazagashvili (GEO)	Ryuji Sonoda (JPN)
Extra-lightweight (60 kg)	Nikolay Ozhegin (RUS)	Georgi Vazagashvili (GEO)	Natik Bagirov (BLR)
Half-lightweight (65 kg)	Udo Quellmalz (GER)	Yukimasa Nakamura (JPN)	Bektaş Demirel (TUR)
Half-lightweight (65 kg)	Udo Quellmalz (GER)	Yukimasa Nakamura (JPN)	Kim Dae-Ik (KOR)
Lightweight (71 kg)	Daisuke Hideshima (JPN)	Kwak Dae-Sung (KOR)	Diego Brambilla (ITA)
Lightweight (71 kg)	Daisuke Hideshima (JPN)	Kwak Dae-Sung (KOR)	Jimmy Pedro (USA)
Half-middleweight (78 kg)	Toshihiko Koga (JPN)	Shay-Oren Smadja (ISR)	Djamel Bouras (FRA)
Half-middleweight (78 kg)	Toshihiko Koga (JPN)	Shay-Oren Smadja (ISR)	Patrick Reiter (AUT)
Middleweight (86 kg)	Jeon Ki-Young (KOR)	Hidehiko Yoshida (JPN)	Nicolas Gill (CAN)
Middleweight (86 kg)	Jeon Ki-Young (KOR)	Hidehiko Yoshida (JPN)	Oleg Maltsev (RUS)
Half-heavyweight (95 kg)	Paweł Nastula (POL)	Dmitri Sergeyev (RUS)	Stéphane Traineau (FRA)
Half-heavyweight (95 kg)	Paweł Nastula (POL)	Dmitri Sergeyev (RUS)	Shigeru Okaizumi (JPN)
Heavyweight (+95 kg)	David Douillet (FRA)	Frank Möller (GER)	David Khakhaleishvili (GEO)
Heavyweight (+95 kg)	David Douillet (FRA)	Frank Möller (GER)	Naoya Ogawa (JPN)
Openweight	David Douillet (FRA)	Sergey Kossorotov (RUS)	Shinichi Shinohara (JPN)
Openweight	David Douillet (FRA)	Sergey Kossorotov (RUS)	Selim Tataroğlu (TUR)

=== Women ===
Event	Gold	Silver	Bronze
Extra-lightweight (48 kg)	Ryoko Tamura (JPN)	Li Aiyue (CHN)	Amarilis Savón (CUB)
Extra-lightweight (48 kg)	Ryoko Tamura (JPN)	Li Aiyue (CHN)	Małgorzata Roszkowska (POL)
Half-lightweight (52 kg)	Marie-Claire Restoux (FRA)	Carolina Mariani (ARG)	Legna Verdecia (CUB)
Half-lightweight (52 kg)	Marie-Claire Restoux (FRA)	Carolina Mariani (ARG)	Sharon Rendle (GBR)
Lightweight (56 kg)	Driulis González (CUB)	Jung Sun-Yong (KOR)	Danielle Zangrando (BRA)
Lightweight (56 kg)	Driulis González (CUB)	Jung Sun-Yong (KOR)	Filipa Cavalleri (POR)
Half-middleweight (61 kg)	Jung Sung-Sook (KOR)	Jenny Gal (NED)	Gella Vandecaveye (BEL)
Half-middleweight (61 kg)	Jung Sung-Sook (KOR)	Jenny Gal (NED)	Cathérine Fleury-Vachon (FRA)
Middleweight (66 kg)	Cho Min-Sun (KOR)	Odalis Revé (CUB)	Aneta Szczepańska (POL)
Middleweight (66 kg)	Cho Min-Sun (KOR)	Odalis Revé (CUB)	Liliko Ogasawara (USA)
Half-heavyweight (72 kg)	Diadenis Luna (CUB)	Ulla Werbrouck (BEL)	Tetyana Belajeva (UKR)
Half-heavyweight (72 kg)	Diadenis Luna (CUB)	Ulla Werbrouck (BEL)	Yoko Tanabe (JPN)
Heavyweight (+72 kg)	Angelique Seriese (NED)	Ying Zhang (CHN)	Daima Beltrán (CUB)
Heavyweight (+72 kg)	Angelique Seriese (NED)	Ying Zhang (CHN)	Shon Hyun-Me (KOR)
Openweight	Monique van der Lee (NED)	Sun Fuming (CHN)	Lee Hyun-Kyung (KOR)
Openweight	Monique van der Lee (NED)	Sun Fuming (CHN)	Estela Rodríguez (CUB)

=== Medal table ===
Rank	Nation	Gold	Silver	Bronze	Total
1	Japan	3	2	5	10
2	South Korea	3	2	3	8
3	France	3	0	3	6
4	Cuba	2	1	4	7
5	Netherlands	2	1	0	3
6	Russia	1	2	1	4
7	Germany	1	1	0	2
8	Poland	1	0	2	3
9	China	0	3	0	3
10	Belgium	0	1	1	2
10	Georgia	0	1	1	2
12	Argentina	0	1	0	1
12	Israel	0	1	0	1
14	Turkey	0	0	2	2
14	United States	0	0	2	2
16	Austria	0	0	1	1
16	Belarus	0	0	1	1
16	Brazil	0	0	1	1
16	Canada	0	0	1	1
16	Great Britain	0	0	1	1
16	Italy	0	0	1	1
16	Portugal	0	0	1	1
16	Ukraine	0	0	1	1
Totals (23 entries)		16	16	32	64

== Results overview ==
=== Men ===
==== 60 kg ====
Position	Judoka	Country
1.	Nikolai Ojeguine	Russia
2.	Giorgi Vazagashvili	Georgia
3.	Ryuji Sonoda	Japan
3.	Natik Bagirov	Belarus
5.	Nazim Huseynov	Azerbaijan
5.	Richard Trautmann	Germany
7.	Guy Fogel	Israel
7.	Kim Jong-Won	South Korea

==== 65 kg ====
Position	Judoka	Country
1.	Udo Quellmalz	Germany
2.	Yukimasa Nakamura	Japan
3.	Bektaş Demirel	Turkey
3.	Kim Dae-Ik	South Korea
5.	József Csák	Hungary
5.	Francesco Giorgi	Italy
7.	Henrique Guimarães	Brazil
7.	Ivan Netov	Bulgaria

==== 71 kg ====
Position	Judoka	Country
1.	Daisuke Hideshima	Japan
2.	Kwak Dae-Sung	South Korea
3.	Diego Brambilla	Italy
3.	Jimmy Pedro	United States
5.	Sebastien Dias	Brazil
5.	Danny Kingston	Great Britain
7.	Andrei Shturbabin	Uzbekistan
7.	Thomas Schleicher	Austria

==== 78 kg ====
Position	Judoka	Country
1.	Toshihiko Koga	Japan
2.	Shay-Oren Smadja	Israel
3.	Djamel Bouras	France
3.	Patrick Reiter	Austria
5.	Flavio Canto	Brazil
5.	Dragomir Radulović	Yugoslavia
7.	Soso Liparteliani	Georgia
7.	Alexandru Ciupe	Canada

==== 86 kg ====
Position	Judoka	Country
1.	Jeon Ki-Young	South Korea
2.	Hidehiko Yoshida	Japan
3.	Nicolas Gill	Canada
3.	Oleg Maltsev	Russia
5.	Ruslan Mashurenko	Ukraine
5.	Frédéric Demontfaucon	France
7.	Adrian Croitoru	Romania
7.	Algimantas Merkevičius	Lithuania

==== 95 kg ====
Position	Judoka	Country
1.	Paweł Nastula	Poland
2.	Dmitri Sergeyev	Russia
3.	Stéphane Traineau	France
3.	Shigeru Okaizumi	Japan
5.	Sergey Shakimov	Kazakhstan
5.	Dmitry Solovyov	Uzbekistan
7.	Ben Sonnemans	Netherlands
7.	Raymond Stevens	Great Britain

==== +95 kg ====
Position	Judoka	Country
1.	David Douillet	France
2.	Frank Möller	Germany
3.	David Khakhaleishvili	Georgia
3.	Naoya Ogawa	Japan
5.	Ernesto Pérez	Spain
5.	Selim Tataroğlu	Turkey
7.	Indrek Pertelson	Estonia
7.	Ruslan Sharapov	Belarus

==== Open class ====
Position	Judoka	Country
1.	David Douillet	France
2.	Sergey Kossorotov	Russia
3.	Shinichi Shinohara	Japan
3.	Selim Tataroğlu	Turkey
5.	Frank Moreno García	Cuba
5.	Harry Van Barneveld	Belgium
7.	Liu Shenggang	China
7.	Igor Müller	Luxembourg

=== Women ===
==== 48 kg ====
Position	Judoka	Country
1.	Ryoko Tani	Japan
2.	Li Aiyue	China
3.	Amarilis Savón	Cuba
3.	Małgorzata Roszkowska	Poland
5.	Tamara Meijer	Netherlands
5.	Hillary Wolf	United States
7.	Yolanda Soler	Spain
7.	Tatiana Moskvina	Belarus

==== 52 kg ====
Position	Judoka	Country
1.	Marie-Claire Restoux	France
2.	Carolina Mariani	Argentina
3.	Legna Verdecia	Cuba
3.	Sharon Rendle	Great Britain
5.	Wang Jing-Ling	China
5.	Almudena Muñoz	Spain
7.	Heidi Goossens	Belgium
7.	Hyun Sook-Hee	South Korea

==== 56 kg ====
Position	Judoka	Country
1.	Driulis González	Cuba
2.	Jung Sun-Yong	South Korea
3.	Danielle Zangrando	Brazil
3.	Filipa Cavalleri	Portugal
5.	Marisabel Lomba	Belgium
5.	Isabel Fernández	Spain
7.	Tanja Münzinger	Germany
7.	Zoulfia Garipova	Russia

==== 61 kg ====
Position	Judoka	Country
1.	Jung Sung-Sook	South Korea
2.	Jenny Gal	Netherlands
3.	Gella Vandecaveye	Belgium
3.	Cathérine Fleury-Vachon	France
5.	Ileana Beltrán	Cuba
5.	Yael Arad	Israel
7.	Michelle Buckingham	Canada
7.	Diane Bell	Great Britain

==== 66 kg ====
Position	Judoka	Country
1.	Cho Min-Sun	South Korea
2.	Odalis Revé	Cuba
3.	Aneta Szczepańska	Poland
3.	Liliko Ogasawara	United States
5.	Claudia Zwiers	Netherlands
5.	Alice Dubois	France
7.	Melanie Engoang	Gabon
7.	Mariela Spacek	Austria

==== 72 kg ====
Position	Judoka	Country
1.	Diadenis Luna	Cuba
2.	Ulla Werbrouck	Belgium
3.	Tetyana Belajeva	Ukraine
3.	Yoko Tanabe	Japan
5.	Kate Howey	Great Britain
5.	Zhao Limin	China
7.	Karin Kienhuis	Netherlands
7.	Estha Essombe	France

==== +72 kg ====
Position	Judoka	Country
1.	Angelique Seriese	Netherlands
2.	Ying Zhang	China
3.	Daima Beltrán	Cuba
3.	Shon Hyun-Me	South Korea
5.	Svetlana Goundarenko	Russia
5.	Noriko Anno	Japan
7.	Donata Burgatta	Italy
7.	Colleen Rosensteel	United States

==== Open class ====
Position	Judoka	Country
1.	Monique van der Lee	Netherlands
2.	Sun Fuming	China
3.	Lee Hyun-Kyung	South Korea
3.	Estela Rodríguez	Cuba
5.	Noriko Anno	Japan
5.	Sandra Köppen	Germany
7.	Valeria Brandino	Brazil
7.	Christine Cicot	France
