= Oleg Maltsev =

Russian judoka

Personal information
- Born: 19 November 1967 (age 58) Omsk, Russia
- Occupation: Judoka

Sport
- Sport: Judo
Medal record
Men's judo
Representing Russia
World Championships
Bronze medal – third place	1995 Chiba	86 kg
European Championships
Gold medal – first place	1994 Gdansk	86 kg
Silver medal – second place	1996 The Hague	86 kg
Bronze medal – third place	1993 Athens	86 kg
Bronze medal – third place	1995 Birmingham	86 kg

Profile at external databases
- JudoInside.com: 3365

Oleg Vitalyevich Maltsev (Russian: Олег Витальевич Мальцев; born 19 November 1967, in Omsk) is a Russian judoka, medalist of the CIS Championship, champion and medalist of the championships of Russia and Europe, medalist of the world championship, Honored Master of Sports of Russia. He competed at the 1992 Summer Olympics and the 1996 Summer Olympics.

== Achievements ==
Year	Tournament	Place	Weight class
1996	Olympic Games	7th	Middleweight (86 kg)
1996	European Judo Championships	2nd	Middleweight (86 kg)
1995	World Judo Championships	3rd	Middleweight (86 kg)
1995	European Judo Championships	3rd	Middleweight (86 kg)
1994	European Judo Championships	1st	Middleweight (86 kg)
1993	European Judo Championships	3rd	Middleweight (86 kg)
