= 1988 Asian Judo Championships =

Judo competition

The 1988 Asian Judo Championships were held at Damascus, Syria in July.

== Medal overview ==
=== Men's events ===
Event	Gold	Silver	Bronze
Extra-lightweight (60 kg)	Tadanori Koshino (JPN)	Pak (PRK)	Ju (CHN)
Extra-lightweight (60 kg)	Tadanori Koshino (JPN)	Pak (PRK)	Xi (TPE)
Half-lightweight (65 kg)	Park Jae-hwan (KOR)	Misaki Iteya (JPN)	Kim (PRK)
Half-lightweight (65 kg)	Park Jae-hwan (KOR)	Misaki Iteya (JPN)	Hussain Hassan (KUW)
Lightweight (71 kg)	Kim Jin-hong (KOR)	Yukiharu Yoshitaka (JPN)	Yu (TPE)
Lightweight (71 kg)	Kim Jin-hong (KOR)	Yukiharu Yoshitaka (JPN)	Li Chang-Su (PRK)
Half-middleweight (78 kg)	Hidehiko Yoshida (JPN)	Kim Hwal-yeon (KOR)	Hisham el-Sharaf (KUW)
Half-middleweight (78 kg)	Hidehiko Yoshida (JPN)	Kim Hwal-yeon (KOR)	Alhaaq (SYR)
Middleweight (86 kg)	Teruya Ishida (JPN)	Park Bo-keun (KOR)	Liu Junlin (CHN)
Middleweight (86 kg)	Teruya Ishida (JPN)	Park Bo-keun (KOR)	Chiu Heng-An (TPE)
Half-heavyweight (95 kg)	Heo Hyeong (KOR)	Yasuhirio Kai (JPN)	Chen (TPE)
Half-heavyweight (95 kg)	Heo Hyeong (KOR)	Yasuhirio Kai (JPN)	Jazaari (SYR)
Heavyweight (+95 kg)	Shuji Murakami (JPN)	Xu Guoqing (CHN)	Hwang Jae-gil (PRK)
Heavyweight (+95 kg)	Shuji Murakami (JPN)	Xu Guoqing (CHN)	Yang Chang-hun (KOR)
Openweight	Naoya Ogawa (JPN)	Xu Guoqing (CHN)	Hwang Jae-gil (PRK)
Openweight	Naoya Ogawa (JPN)	Xu Guoqing (CHN)	Alhamad (KUW)

=== Women's events ===
Event	Gold	Silver	Bronze
Extra-lightweight (48 kg)	Li Aiyue (CHN)	Wakaba Suzuki (JPN)	Cho Min-Sun (KOR)
Extra-lightweight (48 kg)	Li Aiyue (CHN)	Wakaba Suzuki (JPN)	Ding (TPE)
Half-lightweight (52 kg)	Ok Kyeong-suk (KOR)	Hu (CHN)	Noriko Mizoguchi (JPN)
Half-lightweight (52 kg)	Ok Kyeong-suk (KOR)	Hu (CHN)	Cheng (TPE)
Lightweight (56 kg)	Kasumi Izumi (JPN)	Ching (TPE)	Jung Sun-Yong (KOR)
Lightweight (56 kg)	Kasumi Izumi (JPN)	Ching (TPE)	Shieh (TPE)
Half-middleweight (61 kg)	Kim Seong-eok (KOR)	Hiroko Kitazume (JPN)	Zhang Di (CHN)
Half-middleweight (61 kg)	Kim Seong-eok (KOR)	Hiroko Kitazume (JPN)	Wu Mei-Ling (TPE)
Middleweight (66 kg)	Qin (CHN)	Park Ji-yeong (KOR)	Yung (TPE)
Middleweight (66 kg)	Qin (CHN)	Park Ji-yeong (KOR)	Prit (IND)
Half-heavyweight (72 kg)	Park Mi-jeong (KOR)	Akiko Sato (JPN)	Ayassi (SYR)
Half-heavyweight (72 kg)	Park Mi-jeong (KOR)	Akiko Sato (JPN)	Guo (TPE)
Heavyweight (+72 kg)	Gao Fenglian (CHN)	Yeh Wen-Hua (TPE)	Mun Ji-yun (KOR)
Heavyweight (+72 kg)	Gao Fenglian (CHN)	Yeh Wen-Hua (TPE)	Mehta (IND)
Openweight	Gao Fenglian (CHN)	Mun Ji-yun (KOR)	Yoko Sakaue (JPN)
Openweight	Gao Fenglian (CHN)	Mun Ji-yun (KOR)	Mehta (IND)

=== Medals table ===
Rank	Nation	Gold	Silver	Bronze	Total
1	Japan (JPN)	6	6	2	14
2	South Korea (KOR)	5	4	4	13
3	China (CHN)	4	3	3	10
4	North Korea (PRK)	1	1	4	6
5	Chinese Taipei (TPE)	0	2	10	12
6	India (IND)	0	0	3	3
6	Kuwait (KUW)	0	0	3	3
6	Syria (SYR)	0	0	3	3
Totals (8 entries)		16	16	32	64
