= Shigeru Okaizumi =

Japanese judoka (born 1968)

Medal record

Representing Japan

Men's Judo

World Championships
| Bronze medal – third place | 1995 Chiba | -95 kg |

Asian Games
| Gold medal – first place | 1994 Hiroshima | -95 kg |

Shigeru Okaizumi (岡泉 茂, Okaizumi Shigeru; born 21 April 1968) is a retired Japanese judoka.

== Career ==
Okaizumi is from Kamikawa, Saitama. He began judo with his older brother at the dojo near his house. Okaizumi belonged to Nippon Steel after graduation from Tokai University.

In 1994, he won a gold medal at the Asian Games held in Hiroshima, Japan. In 1995, he also participated in the World Championships held in Chiba but was defeated by Paweł Nastula from Poland (Movie).

As of 2010, he has coached Nippon Steel Hirohata judo club since 2002 and All-Japan women's judo team since 2006.

== Achievements ==
- 1986 - All-Japan Junior Championships (-86 kg) 3rd
- 1988 - All-Japan Junior Championships (-86 kg) 3rd
- 1992 - All-Japan Businessgroup Championships (-95 kg) 2nd
- 1993 - Kodokan Cup (-95 kg) 1st

- All-Japan Businessgroup Championships (-95 kg) 1st

- 1994 - Asian Games (-95 kg) 1st

- Jigoro Kano Cup (-95kg) 1st
- All-Japan Selected Championships (-95kg) 2nd
- Kodokan Cup (-95kg) 1st

- 1995 - World Championships (-96 kg) 3rd

- All-Japan Selected Championships (-95kg) 1st

- 1996 - All-Japan Selected Championships (-95 kg) 3rd
