= David Khakhaleishvili =

Georgian judoka (1971–2021)

Personal information
- Born: 28 February 1971
- Died: 11 January 2021 (aged 49)
- Occupation: Judoka

Sport
- Country: Georgia
- Sport: Judo
- Weight class: +95 kg, Open

Achievements and titles
- Olympic Games: (gold) (1992)
- World Champ.: (silver) (1991, 1993)
- European Champ.: (gold) (1993, 1993, 1996)
Medal record
Men's judo
Representing Unified Team
Olympic Games
Gold medal – first place	1992 Barcelona	+95 kg
Representing Georgia
World Championships
Silver medal – second place	1993 Hamilton	+95 kg
Bronze medal – third place	1993 Hamilton	Open
Bronze medal – third place	1995 Chiba	+95 kg
European Championships
Gold medal – first place	1993 Athens	Open
Gold medal – first place	1993 Athens	+95 kg
Gold medal – first place	1996 The Hague	+95 kg
Representing Soviet Union
World Championships
Silver medal – second place	1991 Barcelona	Open
European Championships
Bronze medal – third place	1990 Frankfurt	Open
European Junior Championships
Gold medal – first place	1988 Vienna	+95 kg
Gold medal – first place	1989 Athens	+95 kg

Profile at external databases
- IJF: 2703
- JudoInside.com: 2645
- Updated on 5 June 2023

David Rostomovich Khakhaleishvili (Georgian: დავით როსტომის ძე ხახალეიშვილი; 28 February 1971 – 11 January 2021) was a heavyweight Georgian judoka, mixed martial artist and Olympic gold medalist. He was born in Kutaisi.

== Career ==
Khakhaleishvili was expected to defend his heavyweight Olympic title at the 1996 Summer Olympics in Atlanta, U.S. in a highly anticipated match against the reigning world champion, David Douillet, but Khakhaleishvili and his coach went to the wrong location for weigh-ins and Khakhaleishvili was disqualified from the competition for failing to make weight.

== Mixed martial-arts record ==
Res.	Record	Opponent	Method	Event	Date	Round	Time	Location	Notes
Loss	1–2	Yoshihiro Nakao	TKO (submission to punches)	K-1: Premium 2003 Dynamite!!	31 December 2003	2	1:13	Nagoya, Japan	
Loss	1–1	Yoshihisa Yamamoto		RINGS: Battle Dimensions Tournament 1996 Opening Round	25 October 1996			Japan	Battle Dimensions Tournament 1996 Opening Round.
Win	1–0	Herman Renting		RINGS: Budokan Hall 1995	25 January 1995			Tokyo, Japan	
