= Giorgi Vazagashvili =

Georgian judoka (born 1974)

Personal information
- Born: 19 April 1974 (age 52)
- Occupation: Judoka

Sport
- Country: Georgia
- Sport: Judo
- Weight class: ‍–‍60 kg, ‍–‍66 kg, ‍–‍73 kg

Achievements and titles
- Olympic Games: (bronze) (2000)
- World Champ.: (silver) (1995)
- European Champ.: (gold) (1996, 1997)
Medal record
Men's judo
Representing Georgia
Olympic Games
Bronze medal – third place	2000 Sydney	‍–‍66 kg
World Championships
Silver medal – second place	1995 Chiba	‍–‍60 kg
Bronze medal – third place	1993 Hamilton	‍–‍60 kg
Bronze medal – third place	1997 Paris	‍–‍65 kg
European Championships
Gold medal – first place	1996 The Hague	‍–‍60 kg
Gold medal – first place	1997 Oostende	‍–‍71 kg
Silver medal – second place	1995 Birmingham	‍–‍60 kg
Bronze medal – third place	1996 St. Petersburg	Men's team
Bronze medal – third place	1999 Bratislava	‍–‍73 kg
World Juniors Championships
Gold medal – first place	1994 Cairo	‍–‍60 kg
European Junior Championships
Gold medal – first place	1993 Arnhem	‍–‍60 kg

Profile at external databases
- IJF: 8187
- JudoInside.com: 409
- Updated on 31 May 2023

Giorgi Vazagashvili (Georgian: გიორგი ვაზაგაშვილი; born 19 April 1974) is a Georgian judoka. At the 2000 Summer Olympics he won a bronze medal in the men's Half Lightweight (‍–‍66 kg) category, together with Girolamo Giovinazzo of Italy. Vazagashvili was a silver medalist at the Tokyo 1995 World Championships, and a bronze medalist at Hamilton 1993 and Paris 1997. Two times European champion in Hague 1996 and Oostende 1997, silver medalist in Birmingham 1995 and bronze medalist in Bratislava 1999. He is World Junior Champion in Cairo 1994, in final he won against Tadahiro Nomura. European Junior Champion in Arnhem 1993. Vazagashvili is champion of international tournament in Tbilisi 1992, 1993, Moscow 1993, 1997, Prague 1996, Munich 1997, Warsaw 2000, bronze medalist in Paris 1995, bronze medalist Matsutaro Shoriki Cup Tokyo 1998.
