= 1993 World Judo Championships =

Judo competition

Judo 1993 World Judo Championships
- Venue: TD Coliseum
- Location: Hamilton, Canada
- Dates: September 30 – October 3, 1993
- Competitors: 508 from 79 nations

Competition at external databases
- Links: IJF • JudoInside

The 1993 World Judo Championships were the 18th edition of the World Judo Championships, and were held in Hamilton, Canada from September 30 to October 3, 1993.

== Medal overview ==
=== Men ===
Event	Gold	Silver	Bronze
60 kg	(Japan) Ryuji Sonoda	(Azerbaijan) Nazim Huseynov	(Germany) Richard Trautmann (Georgia (country)) Georgi Vazagashvili
65 kg	(Japan) Yukimasa Nakamura	(Switzerland) Eric Born	(Russia) Sergei Kosmynin (Germany) Udo Quellmalz
71 kg	(South Korea) Chung Hoon	(Hungary) Bertalan Hajtós	(Brazil) Rogério Sampaio (Japan) Daisuke Hideshima
78 kg	(South Korea) Jeon Ki-Young	(Japan) Hidehiko Yoshida	(United States) Jason Morris (France) Darcel Yandzi
86 kg	(Japan) Yoshio Nakamura	(Canada) Nicolas Gill	(Romania) Adrian Croitoru (Spain) León Villar
95 kg	(Hungary) Antal Kovács	(Brazil) Aurélio Miguel	(Germany) Marc Meiling (France) Stéphane Traineau
+95 kg	(France) David Douillet	(Georgia (country)) David Khakhaleishvili	(Russia) Sergei Kosorotov (Germany) Frank Möller
Open	(Poland) Rafał Kubacki	(Germany) Henry Stohr	(Georgia (country)) David Khakhaleishvili (Japan) Naoya Ogawa

=== Women ===
Event	Gold	Silver	Bronze
48 kg	(Japan) Ryoko Tamura	(China) Li Aiyue	(United Kingdom) Joyce Heron (Italy) Giovanna Tortora
52 kg	(Cuba) Legna Verdecia	(Spain) Almudena Muñoz	(France) Cécile Nowak (Japan) Wakaba Suzuki
56 kg	(United Kingdom) Nicola Fairbrother	(Japan) Chiyori Tateno	(Netherlands) Jessica Gal (Cuba) Driulis González
61 kg	(Belgium) Gella Vandecaveye	(Israel) Yael Arad	(United Kingdom) Diane Bell (Cuba) Ileana Beltrán
66 kg	(South Korea) Cho Min-sun	(United States) Liliko Ogasawara	(Cuba) Odalis Revé (China) Di Zhang
72 kg	(China) Leng Chunhui	(United Kingdom) Kate Howey	(Russia) Victoria Kazounina (South Korea) Kim Mi-jung
+72 kg	(Germany) Johanna Hagn	(Japan) Noriko Anno	(Russia) Svetlana Goundarenko (Netherlands) Monique van der Lee
Open	(Poland) Beata Maksymow	(Netherlands) Angelique Seriese	(South Korea) Moon Ji-yoon (China) Ying Zhang

=== Medal table ===
Rank	Nation	Gold	Silver	Bronze	Total
1	Japan	4	3	3	10
2	South Korea	3	0	2	5
3	Poland	2	0	0	2
4	Germany	1	1	4	6
5	China	1	1	2	4
5	Great Britain	1	1	2	4
7	Hungary	1	1	0	2
8	Cuba	1	0	3	4
8	France	1	0	3	4
10	Belgium	1	0	0	1
11	Georgia	0	1	2	3
11	Netherlands	0	1	2	3
13	Brazil	0	1	1	2
13	Spain	0	1	1	2
13	United States	0	1	1	2
16	Azerbaijan	0	1	0	1
16	Canada	0	1	0	1
16	Israel	0	1	0	1
16	Switzerland	0	1	0	1
20	Russia	0	0	4	4
21	Italy	0	0	1	1
21	Romania	0	0	1	1
Totals (22 entries)		16	16	32	64
