= Ryuji Sonoda =

Japanese judoka (born 1973)

Medal record

Representing Japan

Men's Judo

World Championships
Gold medal – first place	1993 Hamilton	-60 kg
Bronze medal – third place	1995 Chiba	-60 kg

Asian Games
Silver medal – second place	1994 Hiroshima	-60 kg

Asian Championships
Bronze medal – third place	1997 Manila	-66 kg

Ryuji Sonoda (園田 隆二, Sonoda Ryūji; born September 16, 1973) is a Japanese judoka.

He was born in Ōmuta, Fukuoka, and began judo at the age of a first grader.

He won a gold medal at the -60 kg category of the Junior World Championships in 1992 and World Championships in 1993. After graduating from Meiji University, he entered the Tokyo Metropolitan Police Department.

Sonoda retired from competition in 2004. By 2009, he coached All-Japan women's judo team before announcing his resignation on January 31, 2013, following accusations of physical abuse by team members.

He married judoka Noriko Anno in 2010.
