= Wakaba Suzuki =

Japanese judoka (born 1970)

Medal record

Women's Judo

Representing Japan

World Championships
Bronze medal – third place	1993 Hamilton	-52 kg

Asian Championships
Silver medal – second place	1988 Damascus	-48 kg

Wakaba Suzuki (鈴木 若葉, Suzuki Wakaba, born 13 June 1970) is a retired Japanese judoka.

Suzuki was born in Fujimi, Saitama, and began judo in earnest at the age of a 5th grader. She entered the Saitama University after graduating from high-school.

She was counted as a top in Japan by the proud skill, Seoinage and Newaza. In 1993, she participated World Championships held in Hamilton, Ontario but defeated by Almudena Muñoz at semi-final and won a bronze medal. She was also expected to get medal of Olympic Games in 1996 but retired in 1995 due to Overtraining.

As of 2010, Suzuki coaches judo at Shukutoku University and among her students is former Asian champion Sae Nakazawa.

== Achievements ==
- 1985 - All-Japan Selected Championships (-48 kg) 3rd
- 1986 - Fukuoka International Women's Championships (-48 kg) 3rd

- All-Japan Selected Championships (-48 kg) 2nd

- 1987 - Fukuoka International Women's Championships (-48 kg) 2nd

- Pacific Rim Championships (-48 kg) 1st
- All-Japan Selected Championships (-48 kg) 2nd

- 1988 - All-Japan High School Championships (-48 kg) 1st
- 1989 - Fukuoka International Women's Championships (-48 kg) 3rd

- All-Japan Selected Championships (-48 kg) 3rd
- All-Japan University Championships (-48 kg) 2nd

- 1990 - All-Japan Selected Championships (-48 kg) 3rd
- 1991 - All-Japan University Championships (-52 kg) 3rd
- 1992 - All-Japan University Championships (-52 kg) 2nd
- 1993 - World Championships (-52 kg) 3rd

- All-Japan Selected Championships (-48 kg) 1st
