= Liliko Ogasawara =

American judoka

Personal information
- Born: May 21, 1972 (age 54) Englewood, New Jersey, United States

Sport
- Sport: Judo
- University team: San Jose State Spartans
Medal record
Representing United States
World Championships
Silver medal – second place	1993 Hamilton	Middleweight
Bronze medal – third place	1995 Chiba	Middleweight
Pan American Games
Silver medal – second place	1995 Mar del Plata	Middleweight
Bronze medal – third place	1991 Havana	Middleweight
Pan American Championships
Gold medal – first place	1988 Buenos Aires	Middleweight
World Junior Championships
Bronze medal – third place	1990 Dijon	Middleweight

Liliko Ogasawara (born May 21, 1972) is a former judoka who competed for the United States. She competed at the 1996 Summer Olympics.

Raised in Montvale, New Jersey, Ogasawara attended Pascack Hills High School, who became the first New Jersey girl to compete against boys in a high school wrestling interscholastic match, when she participated in four matches in 1989.

== Martial arts career ==
She trained in judo from the age of three. She was placed in several national championships, winning over 10 golds in international competitions. She won silver in the 1993 World Judo Championships and bronze at the 1995 World Championships in Japan while living in San Jose, California, and attending San Jose State University. A hamstring injury stopped her from being able to fully train for Judo at the 1996 Summer Olympics, but she did compete in the 1996 Atlanta Olympic Games. She competed in the 66 kg division (146 lbs) and tied for 7th place on losing to Wang Xianbo of China.

== Author ==
Nagayasu Ogasawara and Liliko Ogasawara were the authors of a Judo video series White to Black.

== Personal life ==
She is the singer of Sessomorte. She is a 5th degree blackbelt in Judo. She is a licensed clinical alcohol and drug counselor and licensed professional counselor in New Jersey.
