= Legna Verdecia =

Cuban judoka (born 1972)

Personal information
- Born: 29 October 1972 (age 53)
- Occupation: Judoka

Sport
- Country: Cuba
- Sport: Judo
- Weight class: –48 kg, –52 kg

Achievements and titles
- Olympic Games: (gold) (2000)
- World Champ.: (gold) (1993)
- Pan American Champ.: (gold) (1988, 1990, 1997, 1998)
Medal record
Women's judo
Representing Cuba
Olympic Games
Gold medal – first place	2000 Sydney	‍–‍52 kg
Bronze medal – third place	1996 Atlanta	‍–‍52 kg
World Championships
Gold medal – first place	1993 Hamilton	‍–‍52 kg
Silver medal – second place	1999 Birmingham	‍–‍52 kg
Bronze medal – third place	1991 Barcelona	‍–‍48 kg
Bronze medal – third place	1995 Chiba	‍–‍52 kg
Bronze medal – third place	2001 Munich	‍–‍52 kg
Pan American Games
Gold medal – first place	1991 Havana	‍–‍48 kg
Gold medal – first place	1995 Mara del Plata	‍–‍52 kg
Gold medal – first place	1999 Winnipeg	‍–‍52 kg
Pan American Championships
Gold medal – first place	1988 Buenos Aires	‍–‍45 kg
Gold medal – first place	1990 Caracas	‍–‍48 kg
Gold medal – first place	1997 Guadalajara	‍–‍52 kg
Gold medal – first place	1998 Santo Domingo	‍–‍52 kg
Silver medal – second place	1996 San Juan	‍–‍52 kg
Bronze medal – third place	1992 Ontario	‍–‍52 kg
Bronze medal – third place	1994 Santiago	‍–‍52 kg
World Juniors Championships
Gold medal – first place	1990 Dijon	‍–‍48 kg
Summer Universiade
Gold medal – first place	1999 Palma de Mallorca	‍–‍52 kg
Bronze medal – third place	1995 Fukuoka	‍–‍52 kg

Profile at external databases
- IJF: 20045
- JudoInside.com: 997
- Updated on 1 June 2023

Legna Verdecia Rodríguez (born 29 October 1972 in Granma) is a Cuban judoka who won Olympic medals in 1996 and 2000. In a career from 1989 to 2006 she won 165 out of 187 fights, making her one of the most successful Cuban judoka in history.
