= Ernesto Pérez =

Spanish judoka

Ernesto Pérez OLY
Personal information
- Full name: Ernesto Pérez Lobo
- Born: 5 September 1970 (age 55) Madrid, Spain
- Occupation: Judoka

Sport
- Country: Spain
- Sport: Judo
- Weight class: +95 kg, +100 kg, Open

Achievements and titles
- Olympic Games: (silver) (1996)
- World Champ.: 5th (1993, 1995)
- European Champ.: (silver) (1999)
Medal record
Men's judo
Representing Spain
Olympic Games
Silver medal – second place	1996 Atlanta	+95 kg
European Championships
Silver medal – second place	1999 Bratislava	Open
Bronze medal – third place	2000 Wrocław	+100 kg

Profile at external databases
- IJF: 35830
- JudoInside.com: 632
- Updated on 4 June 2023

Ernesto Pérez Lobo (Note: In this Spanish name, the first or paternal surname is Pérez and the second or maternal family name is Lobo.) (born 5 September 1970) is a Spanish judoka.

== Achievements ==
Year	Tournament	Place	Weight class
2000	Olympic Games	7th	Heavyweight (+100 kg)
2000	European Judo Championships	3rd	Heavyweight (+100 kg)
1999	European Judo Championships	2nd	Open class
1997	World Judo Championships	7th	Heavyweight (+95 kg)
1997	European Judo Championships	5th	Heavyweight (+95 kg)
1997	Mediterranean Games	3rd	Heavyweight (+95 kg)
1996	Olympic Games	2nd	Heavyweight (+95 kg)
1995	World Judo Championships	5th	Heavyweight (+95 kg)
1995	European Judo Championships	5th	Open class
1993	World Judo Championships	5th	Open class
1993	Mediterranean Games	2nd	Heavyweight (+95 kg)
1992	Olympic Games	7th	Heavyweight (+95 kg)
