= Cho Min-sun =

South Korean judoka (born 1972)

Personal information
- Nationality: South Korean
- Born: 21 March 1972 (age 54) Yeongam County, South Jeolla Province, South Korea
- Occupation: Judoka

Korean name
- Hangul: 조민선
- Hanja: 曹敏仙
- RR: Jo Minseon
- MR: Cho Minsŏn

Sport
- Country: South Korea
- Sport: Judo
- Weight class: –48 kg to –70 kg

Achievements and titles
- Olympic Games: (gold) (1996)
- World Champ.: (1993, 1995)
- Asian Champ.: (gold) (1993)
Medal record
Women's judo
Representing South Korea
Olympic Games
Gold medal – first place	1996 Atlanta	‍–‍66 kg
Bronze medal – third place	1988 Seoul	‍–‍48 kg
Bronze medal – third place	2000 Sydney	‍–‍70 kg
World Championships
Gold medal – first place	1993 Hamilton	‍–‍66 kg
Gold medal – first place	1995 Chiba	‍–‍66 kg
Bronze medal – third place	1989 Belgrade	‍–‍52 kg
Bronze medal – third place	1997 Paris	‍–‍66 kg
Asian Games
Silver medal – second place	1994 Hiroshima	‍–‍66 kg
Bronze medal – third place	1990 Beijing	‍–‍56 kg
Asian Championships
Gold medal – first place	1993 Macau	‍–‍66 kg
Bronze medal – third place	1988 Damascus	‍–‍48 kg
Bronze medal – third place	1995 New Delhi	‍–‍66 kg
Bronze medal – third place	2000 Osaka	‍–‍70 kg
World Juniors Championships
Gold medal – first place	1990 Dijon	‍–‍56 kg
Summer Universiade
Gold medal – first place	1995 Fukuoka	‍–‍66 kg

Profile at external databases
- IJF: 15584
- JudoInside.com: 3653
- Updated on 2 June 2023

Cho Min-sun (born 21 March 1972) is a South Korean judoka.

Cho won a gold medal in the middleweight division at the 1996 Summer Olympics and a bronze medal at the 2000 Summer Olympics, and also won two gold medals at the 1993 and 1995 World Championships.

Cho also won a bronze medal in the -48 kg division at the 1988 Summer Olympics in Seoul, where women's judo was held as a demonstration sport.

Cho is the only South Korean judoka to win national championships in five different judo divisions: from 48 to 66 kg.

She is currently a full professor at Korea National Sport University in Seoul.
