= Patrick Reiter =

Austrian Olympic judoka

Personal information
- Born: 17 August 1972 (age 53)
- Occupation: Judoka
- Employer: HSZ Hochfilzen
- Height: 178 cm (5 ft 10 in)
- Weight: 82 kg (181 lb)

Sport
- Sport: Judo
- Club: ESV Sanjindo Bischofshofen; TSV Abensberg
- Retired: 2001
Medal record
Men's judo
Representing Austria
World Championships
Bronze medal – third place	1995 Tokyo	78 kg
Bronze medal – third place	1997 Paris	78 kg
European Championships
Gold medal – first place	1995 Birmingham	78 kg
Bronze medal – third place	1994 Gdansk	78 kg
Bronze medal – third place	1996 The Hague	78 kg
Bronze medal – third place	1997 Ostend	78 kg

Profile at external databases
- IJF: 53195
- JudoInside.com: 3218

Patrick Reiter (born 17 August 1972) is a retired Austrian judoka. He competed at the 1996 Summer Olympics and the 2000 Summer Olympics.

Reiter ended his career in 2001.

== Achievements ==
Year	Tournament	Place	Weight class
1999	World Judo Championships	7th	Half middleweight (81 kg)
1997	World Judo Championships	3rd	Half middleweight (78 kg)
1997	European Judo Championships	3rd	Half middleweight (78 kg)
1996	European Judo Championships	3rd	Half middleweight (78 kg)
1995	World Judo Championships	3rd	Half middleweight (78 kg)
1995	European Judo Championships	1st	Half middleweight (78 kg)
1994	European Judo Championships	3rd	Half middleweight (78 kg)
