= Jeon Ki-young =

South Korean judoka

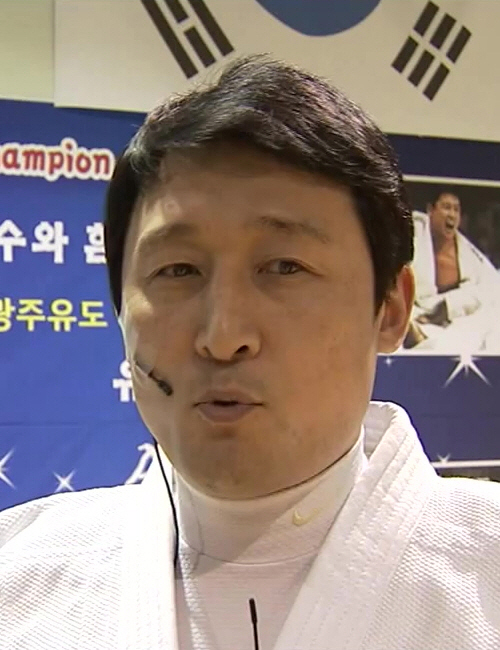

Personal information
- Born: 11 July 1973 (age 52)
- Occupation: Judoka
- Height: 179 cm (5 ft 10 in)

Korean name
- Hangul: 전기영
- Hanja: 全己盈
- RR: Jeon Giyeong
- MR: Chŏn Kiyŏng

Sport
- Country: South Korea
- Sport: Judo
- Weight class: –78 kg, –86 kg

Achievements and titles
- Olympic Games: (gold) (1996)
- World Champ.: (1993, 1995, 1997)
- Asian Champ.: (gold) (1995)
Medal record
Men's judo
Representing South Korea
Olympic Games
Gold medal – first place	1996 Atlanta	‍–‍86 kg
World Championships
Gold medal – first place	1993 Hamilton	‍–‍78 kg
Gold medal – first place	1995 Chiba	‍–‍86 kg
Gold medal – first place	1997 Paris	‍–‍86 kg
Asian Championships
Gold medal – first place	1995 New Delhi	‍–‍86 kg
Bronze medal – third place	1996 Ho Chi Minh	‍–‍86 kg

Profile at external databases
- IJF: 23316
- JudoInside.com: 3677
- Updated on 4 June 2023

Jeon Ki-young (Korean: 전기영, born 11 July 1973 in Cheongju, North Chungcheong Province) is a retired judoka who competed in the ‍–‍78 kg and ‍–‍86 kg divisions.

Jeon has won three consecutive world championships (1993, 1995 & 1997), twice beating Hidehiko Yoshida in dramatic fashion in the finals. He has also won six world cup titles.

The crowning moment in Jeon's judo career came in winning the gold medal in the men's middleweight division at the 1996 Olympics in Atlanta, U.S. He defeated Armen Bagdasarov of Uzbekistan in the final match by ippon. In his march to the gold, Jeon won every match by ippon, except the 1st round match against the Dutch judoka Mark Huizinga, who would go on to dominate the weight once Jeon himself retired.

Jeon retired from competition at a relatively young age of 25 in 1999, citing both knee injuries and an absence of motivation due to a lack of competition. He retired undefeated in both Olympic and world championship competition.

In 2003, PRIDE FC and Antonio Inoki tried to sign Jeon to fight Yoshida under MMA rules (using the fact that Jeon has never lost against Yoshida in judo) but Jeon refused offers.

== Championships & accomplishments ==
- 1997 World Championships 86 kg class in Paris, France – gold medal
- 1997 French Open 86 kg class in Paris, France – gold medal
- 1997 East Asian Games 86 kg class in Busan, Korea – silver medal
- 1997 & 1994 Austrian Open 86 kg class in Leonding, Austria – gold medal
- 1996 Olympic Games 86 kg class in Atlanta, Georgia, U.S. – gold medal
- 1995 World Championships 86 kg class in Makuhari, Chiba, Japan – gold medal
- 1995 Asian Championships 86 kg class in New Delhi, India – gold medal
- 1995 Dutch Open 86 kg class in 's-Hertogenbosch, The Netherlands – gold medal
- 1994 German Open 78 kg class in Munich, Germany – gold medal
- 1993 World Championships 78 kg class in Hamilton, Canada – gold medal
- 1993 French Open 78 kg class in Paris, France – gold medal
