= Jung Sun-yong =

South Korean judoka (born 1971)

Personal information
- Born: 11 March 1971 (age 55)
- Occupation: Judoka

Korean name
- Hangul: 정선용
- Hanja: 鄭善溶
- RR: Jeong Seonyong
- MR: Chŏng Sŏnyong

Sport
- Country: South Korea
- Sport: Judo
- Weight class: ‍–‍56 kg

Achievements and titles
- Olympic Games: (silver) (1996)
- World Champ.: (silver) (1995)
- Asian Champ.: (gold) (1991, 1993, 1994, 1995)
Medal record
Women's judo
Representing South Korea
Olympic Games
Silver medal – second place	1996 Atlanta	‍–‍56 kg
World Championships
Silver medal – second place	1995 Chiba	‍–‍56 kg
Bronze medal – third place	1989 Belgrade	‍–‍56 kg
Asian Games
Gold medal – first place	1994 Hiroshima	‍–‍56 kg
Asian Championships
Gold medal – first place	1991 Osaka	‍–‍56 kg
Gold medal – first place	1993 Macau	‍–‍56 kg
Gold medal – first place	1995 New Delhi	‍–‍56 kg
Bronze medal – third place	1988 Damascus	‍–‍56 kg
Summer Universiade
Bronze medal – third place	1995 Fukuoka	‍–‍56 kg

Profile at external databases
- IJF: 53288
- JudoInside.com: 3684
- Updated on 4 June 2023

Jung Sun-Yong (born 11 March 1971) is a female South Korean judoka.

== Career ==
At the age of 14, she was the youngest judoka ever to represent South Korea in 1985.

Jung won two medals at the 1989 and 1995 World Championships, and also gained a silver medal in the lightweight division at the 1996 Summer Olympics.

Jung won the Asian Championship three consecutive times, the Fukuoka International Female Judo Championship five times, and the Paris Open (Tournoi de Paris) three times.

Jung retired right after the 1996 Olympics, and currently serves as a teacher in elementary school.
