= Moon Ji-yoon (judoka) =

South Korean judoka

Personal information
- Nationality: South Korean
- Born: 19 April 1971 (age 55)

Sport
- Sport: Judo

Moon Ji-yoon (Korean: 문지윤, born 19 April 1971) is a South Korean judoka. She competed in the women's heavyweight event at the 1992 Summer Olympics.

She finished fifth at the 1989 World Judo Championships, won the 1991 World Judo Championships in the +72 kg category, and won a bronze medal at the 1993 World Judo Championships. On the continental level, she won the silver medal at the 1988 Asian Judo Championships (as well as a bronze medal in the open class) and a bronze medal at the 1990 Asian Games.
