= Udo Quellmalz =

German judoka (born 1967)

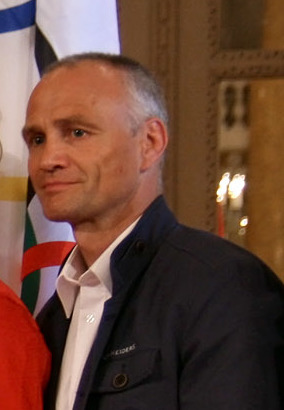
- Quellmalz at the 2012 Olympic Games

Personal information
- Born: 8 March 1967 (age 59) Leipzig, East Germany
- Occupation: Judoka

Sport
- Country: Germany
- Sport: Judo
- Weight class: ‍–‍65 kg

Achievements and titles
- Olympic Games: (gold) (1996)
- World Champ.: (1991, 1995)
- European Champ.: (silver) (1990)
Medal record
Men's judo
Representing Germany
Olympic Games
| Gold medal – first place | 1996 Atlanta | ‍–‍65 kg |
| Bronze medal – third place | 1992 Barcelona | ‍–‍65 kg |
World Championships
| Gold medal – first place | 1991 Barcelona | ‍–‍65 kg |
| Gold medal – first place | 1995 Chiba | ‍–‍65 kg |
| Silver medal – second place | 1989 Belgrade | ‍–‍65 kg |
| Bronze medal – third place | 1993 Hamilton | ‍–‍65 kg |
European Championships
| Silver medal – second place | 1990 Frankfurt | ‍–‍65 kg |
| Bronze medal – third place | 1988 Pamplona | ‍–‍65 kg |
| Bronze medal – third place | 1993 Athens | ‍–‍65 kg |
European Junior Championships
| Gold medal – first place | 1984 Cadiz | ‍–‍65 kg |
| Bronze medal – third place | 1986 Leonding | ‍–‍65 kg |

Profile at external databases
- IJF: 33248
- JudoInside.com: 2204
- Updated on 4 June 2023

Udo Quellmalz (born 8 March 1967 in Leipzig), known as Quelle, is a German judoka. He competed in judo at the Summer Olympics, winning a bronze medal in 1992 and a gold medal in 1996. He also won the World Judo Championships in 1991 and 1995. Quellmalz was appointed head coach of the Flemish Judo Federation in 2022. He has previously directed the British judo team and served as a coach for the Austrian and Qatari teams.
