= Daisuke Hideshima =

Japanese judoka (born 1970)

Medal record

Representing Japan

Men's Judo

World Championships
Gold medal – first place	1995 Chiba	-71kg
Bronze medal – third place	1993 Hamilton	-71kg

East Asian Games
Gold medal – first place	1993 Shanghai	-71 kg

Daisuke Hideshima (秀島大介, Hideshima Daisuke; born December 7, 1970 in Fukuoka) is a Japanese judoka.

He began judo at the age of 6.

He won the gold medal in the Lightweight (71kg) division at the 1995 World Judo Championships.
