= Frank Möller (judoka) =

German judoka (born 1970)

Personal information
- Born: 8 September 1970 (age 55) Weimar, East Germany
- Occupation: Judo coach
- Height: 1.89 m (6 ft 2 in)

Sport
- Country: Germany
- Sport: Judo
- Weight class: +95 kg, Open
- Rank: 6th dan black belt
- Club: Marzahner Judo Verein Berlin

Achievements and titles
- Olympic Games: (bronze) (1996)
- World Champ.: (silver) (1995)
- European Champ.: (gold) (1992)
Medal record
Men's judo
Representing Germany
Olympic Games
Bronze medal – third place	1996 Atlanta	+95 kg
World Championships
Silver medal – second place	1995 Chiba	+95 kg
Bronze medal – third place	1993 Hamilton	+95 kg
Bronze medal – third place	2001 Munich	Open
European Championships
Gold medal – first place	1992 Paris	+95 kg
Silver medal – second place	1989 Helsinki	Open
Silver medal – second place	1995 Birmingham	+95 kg
Bronze medal – third place	1990 Frankfurt	+95 kg
Bronze medal – third place	1993 Athens	+95 kg
Bronze medal – third place	1994 Gdansk	+95 kg
Bronze medal – third place	2000 Wrocław	+100 kg
Bronze medal – third place	2000 Wrocław	Open
World Juniors Championships
Bronze medal – third place	1990 Dijon	+95 kg
European Junior Championships
Gold medal – first place	1990 Ankara	+95 kg

Profile at external databases
- IJF: 14435
- JudoInside.com: 267
- Updated on 4 June 2023

Frank Möller (born 8 September 1970 in Weimar) is a German judoka. He won a bronze medal in the heavyweight (+100 kg) division at the 1996 Summer Olympics.

== Personal life ==
Möller is married and has two children.

== Achievements ==
Year	Tournament	Place	Weight class
2003	World Judo Championships	5th	Heavyweight (+100 kg)
2001	World Judo Championships	3rd	Open class
2000	European Judo Championships	3rd	Heavyweight (+100 kg)
2000	European Judo Championships	3rd	Open class
1999	World Judo Championships	5th	Heavyweight (+100 kg)
1998	European Judo Championships	5th	Heavyweight (+100 kg)
1996	Olympic Games	3rd	Heavyweight (+95 kg)
1995	World Judo Championships	2nd	Heavyweight (+95 kg)
1995	European Judo Championships	2nd	Heavyweight (+95 kg)
1993	World Judo Championships	3rd	Heavyweight (+95 kg)
1993	European Judo Championships	3rd	Heavyweight (+95 kg)
1992	European Judo Championships	1st	Heavyweight (+95 kg)
1990	European Judo Championships	3rd	Heavyweight (+95 kg)
1989	European Judo Championships	2nd	Open class
