= Toshihiko Koga =

Japanese judoka (1967–2021)

Personal information
- Nickname: 平成の三四郎
- Born: 21 November 1967 Kitashigeyasu, Saga, Japan
- Died: 24 March 2021 (aged 53)
- Occupation: Judoka
- Website: www.kogatoshihiko.jp

Sport
- Country: Japan
- Sport: Judo
- Weight class: –‍71 kg, –‍78 kg
- Rank: 9th dan black belt

Achievements and titles
- Olympic Games: (gold) (1992)
- World Champ.: (1989, 1991, 1995)
- Asian Champ.: (bronze) (1990)
Medal record
Men's judo
Representing Japan
Olympic Games
| Gold medal – first place | 1992 Barcelona | ‍–‍71 kg |
| Silver medal – second place | 1996 Atlanta | ‍–‍78 kg |
World Championships
| Gold medal – first place | 1989 Belgrade | ‍–‍71 kg |
| Gold medal – first place | 1991 Barcelona | ‍–‍71 kg |
| Gold medal – first place | 1995 Chiba | ‍–‍78 kg |
| Bronze medal – third place | 1987 Essen | ‍–‍71 kg |
Asian Games
| Bronze medal – third place | 1990 Beijing | ‍–‍71 kg |
World Juniors Championships
| Gold medal – first place | 1986 Rome | ‍–‍71 kg |

Profile at external databases
- IJF: 26807
- JudoInside.com: 2891
- Updated on 4 June 2023

Toshihiko Koga (古賀 稔彦, Koga Toshihiko; 21 November 1967 – 24 March 2021) was a Japanese judoka, 9th degree black belt and Olympic champion who competed in the –71 kg and –78 kg divisions. Koga is regarded as having perhaps the greatest ippon seoi nage ever. He died of cancer on 24 March 2021 at the age of 53.

== Biography ==
Koga was born in Kitashigeyasu, Saga, Japan. He began judo in elementary school. He traveled to Tokyo during junior-high school to enter Kodogakusha, a judo school later attended by Olympic gold medalists Hidehiko Yoshida and Makoto Takimoto. He continued his education at the Nippon Sport Science University, and captured several awards including five consecutive championships at the Kodokan Cup and six consecutive championships at the All-Japan Judo Championships (all in the 71 kg division). He placed 3rd in the 1987 World Judo Championships held in Essen, and was chosen to participate in the 1988 Summer Olympics, where he lost in the 3rd round of the competition. Koga returned to the Olympics in 1992 after winning the 1989 and 1991 World Judo Championships, but seriously injured his left knee during a randori (sparring) session against Hidehiko Yoshida, which prevented him from using his best technique; the Ippon Seoinage. He won the gold medal overcoming this injury, and was given the JOC Sports Award by the Japanese Olympic Committee.

Koga briefly retired from competitive judo after his victory at the Olympics, but made his return with a gold medal at the 1995 World Judo Championships in Chiba, Japan. He suffered a surprising defeat by ippon in a qualification match for the 1996 Summer Olympics, but was chosen as the representative anyway because of his past experience in the Olympic games. He ended his third appearance at the Olympics with a silver medal in the -78 kg division.

Koga announced his final retirement from competition in 2000, and became the head coach for the All-Japan women's judo team. In April 2003, he founded the Koga Juku, a judo school for young children, in Takatsu-ku, Kawasaki. One of his pupils, Ayumi Tanimoto, won the gold medal in the -63 kg division at the 2004 Summer Olympics. He became the head coach of the International Pacific University's judo team (located in Akaiwa, Okayama) in April 2007, and has enjoyed celebrity status in Japan as an 8th dan rank holder in judo, appearing on several national television shows.

One day before his death he was promoted to the rank of 9th dan by the Kodokan.
