= Yukimasa Nakamura =

Japanese judoka (born 1972)

Personal information
- Born: 28 August 1972 (age 53)
- Occupation: Judoka

Sport
- Country: Japan
- Sport: Judo
- Weight class: ‍–‍65 kg, ‍–‍66 kg

Achievements and titles
- Olympic Games: (silver) (1996)
- World Champ.: (1993)
- Asian Champ.: (gold) (1994, 1998, 2000)
Medal record
Men's judo
Representing Japan
Olympic Games
Silver medal – second place	1996 Atlanta	‍–‍65 kg
World Championships
Gold medal – first place	1993 Hamilton	‍–‍65 kg
Silver medal – second place	1995 Chiba	‍–‍65 kg
Asian Games
Gold medal – first place	1994 Hiroshima	‍–‍65 kg
Gold medal – first place	1998 Bangkok	‍–‍66 kg
Asian Championships
Gold medal – first place	2000 Osaka	‍–‍66 kg
World Juniors Championships
Gold medal – first place	1990 Dijon	‍–‍65 kg

Profile at external databases
- IJF: 53084
- JudoInside.com: 1472
- Updated on 4 June 2023

Yukimasa Nakamura (中村 行成, Nakamura Yukimasa; born 28 August 1972) is a Japanese judoka, Olympic medalist and world champion. His older brother, Yoshio Nakamura and younger brother, Kenzo Nakamura are also former world champions.

He is from Fukuoka, Fukuoka. After graduation from Tokai University, He belonged to Asahi Kasei. He received a silver medal in the half lightweight (65 kg) division at the 1996 Summer Olympics in Atlanta. He is world champion from 1993, and received a silver medal at the 1995 World Championships.

As of 2008, He coaches judo at Asahi Kasei with his brothers. Among their pupil are world champion Hiroshi Izumi, Masato Uchishiba and so on.
