= Diego Brambilla =

Italian judoka (born 1969)

Personal information
- Nationality: Italian
- Born: 17 February 1969 (age 56); Monza, Italy

Sport
- Sport: Judo

Diego Brambilla (born 17 February 1969) is an Italian judoka. A member of the International Judo Federation, he competed in the men's lightweight event at the 1996 Summer Olympics. He also won the World Cups in 1993, (U71kg) bronze medal in 1995, and Prague in 1996.
