= Selim Tataroğlu =

Turkish judoka (born 1972)

Personal information
- Born: 24 April 1972 (age 54)
- Occupation: Judoka

Sport
- Country: Turkey
- Sport: Judo
- Weight class: +100 kg

Achievements and titles
- Olympic Games: 5th (2000)
- World Champ.: (silver) (1999, 2001)
- European Champ.: (gold) (1997, 1998, 1999, 2004)
Medal record
Men's judo
Representing Turkey
World Championships
Silver medal – second place	1999 Birmingham	Open
Silver medal – second place	2001 Munich	+100 kg
Bronze medal – third place	1995 Chiba	Open
Bronze medal – third place	1999 Birmingham	+100 kg
European Championships
Gold medal – first place	1997 Oostende	+95 kg
Gold medal – first place	1998 Oviedo	Open
Gold medal – first place	1999 Bratislava	Open
Gold medal – first place	2004 Bucharest	+100 kg
Silver medal – second place	1996 The Hague	Open
Silver medal – second place	2000 Wrocław	Open
Bronze medal – third place	1994 Gdansk	+95 kg
Bronze medal – third place	1996 The Hague	+95 kg
Bronze medal – third place	1997 Oostende	Open
Bronze medal – third place	1998 Oviedo	+100 kg
Bronze medal – third place	1999 Bratislava	+100 kg
Bronze medal – third place	2001 Paris	+100 kg
European Junior Championships
Gold medal – first place	1992 Jerusalem	+95 kg

Profile at external databases
- IJF: 15745
- JudoInside.com: 654
- Updated on 17 November 2022

Selim Tataroğlu (born 24 April 1972) is a Turkish judoka. He has been the European judo champion in 1997, 1998, 1999, and 2004. He competed at three Olympic Games.

== Achievements ==
Year	Tournament	Place	Weight class
2005	European Judo Championships	5th	Heavyweight (+100 kg)
2005	Mediterranean Games	1st	Heavyweight (+95 kg)
2004	Olympic Games	7th	Heavyweight (+100 kg)
2004	European Judo Championships	1st	Heavyweight (+100 kg)
2003	World Judo Championships	7th	Heavyweight (+100 kg)
2001	World Judo Championships	2nd	Heavyweight (+100 kg)
2001	European Judo Championships	3rd	Heavyweight (+100 kg)
2000	Olympic Games	5th	Heavyweight (+100 kg)
2000	European Judo Championships	2nd	Open class
1999	World Judo Championships	3rd	Heavyweight (+100 kg)
1999	World Judo Championships	2nd	Open class
1999	European Judo Championships	3rd	Heavyweight (+100 kg)
1999	European Judo Championships	1st	Open class
1998	European Judo Championships	3rd	Heavyweight (+100 kg)
1998	European Judo Championships	1st	Open class
1997	World Judo Championships	5th	Heavyweight (+95 kg)
1997	European Judo Championships	1st	Heavyweight (+95 kg)
1997	European Judo Championships	3rd	Open class
1997	Mediterranean Games	2nd	Heavyweight (+95 kg)
1996	European Judo Championships	3rd	Heavyweight (+95 kg)
1996	European Judo Championships	2nd	Open class
1995	World Judo Championships	5th	Heavyweight (+95 kg)
1995	World Judo Championships	3rd	Open class
1994	European Judo Championships	3rd	Heavyweight (+95 kg)
