= Li Aiyue =

Chinese judoka (born 1970)

Personal information
- Nationality: Chinese
- Born: 15 August 1970 (age 56)

Sport
- Sport: Judo
Medal record
World Judo Championships
Silver medal – second place	1995 Chiba	-48 kg

Li Aiyue (born 15 August 1970) is a Chinese judoka. She competed at the 1992 Summer Olympics and the 1996 Summer Olympics.
