= Naoya Ogawa =

Japanese judoka, professional wrestler and mixed martial arts fighter

Naoya Ogawa 小川直也
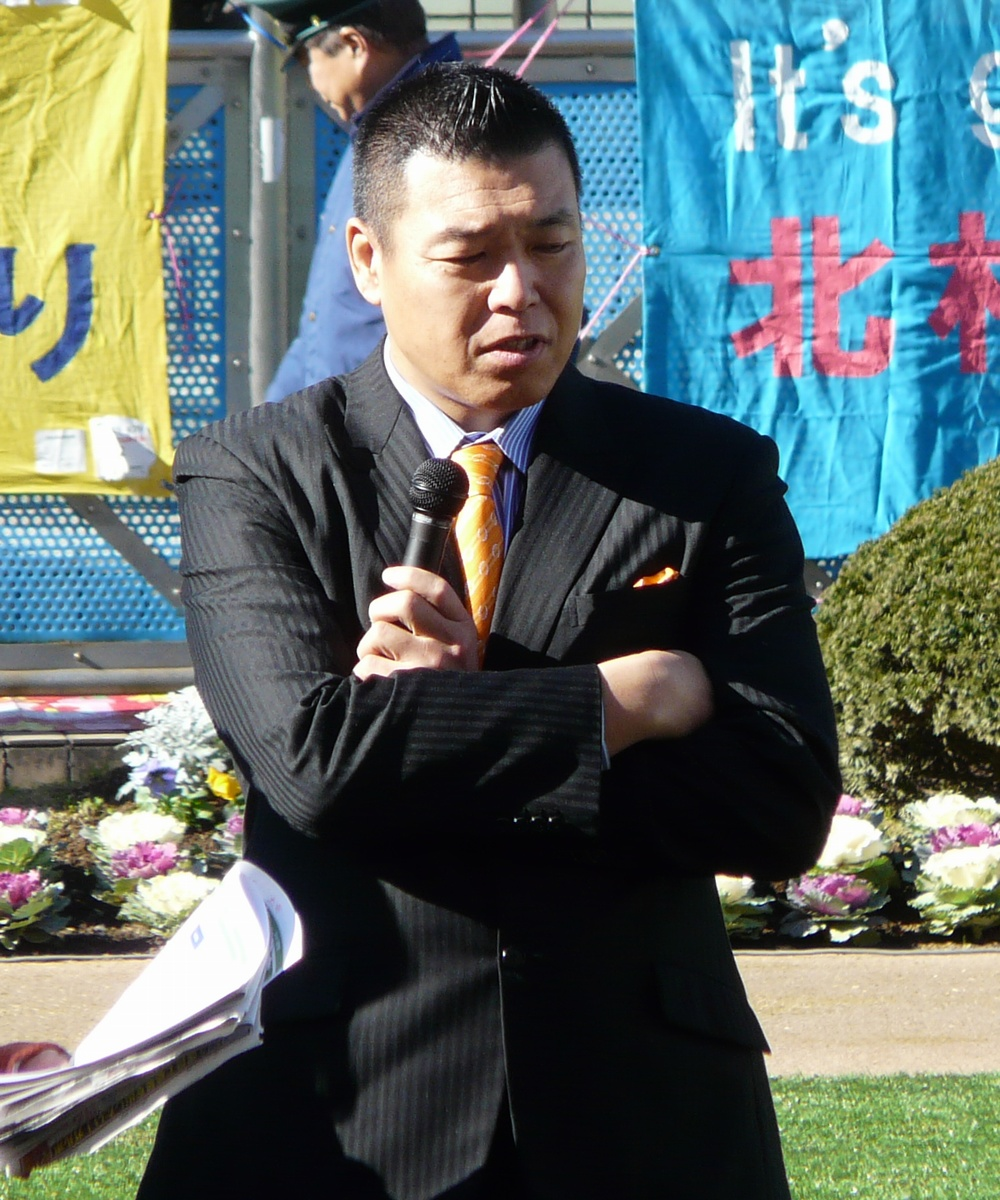
- Ogawa in 2011
- Born: March 31, 1968 (age 58); Suginami, Tokyo, Japan
- Other names: "O-chan", "Captain Hustle", "The King of Recklessness"
- Height: 6 ft 4 in (193 cm)
- Weight: 253 lb (115 kg; 18 st 1 lb)
- Division: Heavyweight
- Style: Judo
- Years active: 1997–2005 (MMA)

Mixed martial arts record
- Total: 9
- Wins: 7
- By knockout: 2
- By submission: 5
- Losses: 2
- By submission: 2

Other information
- Mixed martial arts record from Sherdog
- Judo career
- Weight class: +95 kg, Open

Judo achievements and titles
- Olympic Games: (silver) (1992)
- World Champ.: (gold) (1987, 1989, 1989, 1991)
- Asian Champ.: (gold) (1988)
Medal record
Men's judo
Representing Japan
Olympic Games
Silver medal – second place	1992 Barcelona	+95 kg
World Championships
Gold medal – first place	1987 Essen	Open
Gold medal – first place	1989 Belgrade	+95 kg
Gold medal – first place	1989 Belgrade	Open
Gold medal – first place	1991 Barcelona	Open
Bronze medal – third place	1991 Barcelona	+95 kg
Bronze medal – third place	1993 Hamilton	Open
Bronze medal – third place	1995 Chiba	+95 kg
Asian Games
Bronze medal – third place	1990 Beijing	+95 kg
Asian Championships
Gold medal – first place	1988 Damascus	Open
Summer Universiade
Gold medal – first place	1988 Tbilisi	+95 kg
Bronze medal – third place	1986 Sao Paulo	Open

Profile at external judo databases
- IJF: 50391
- JudoInside.com: 2934

Naoya Ogawa (Japanese: 小川 直也, Ogawa Naoya) (born 31 March 1968) is a Japanese world champion judoka, retired professional wrestler, and mixed martial artist. He won a total of seven medals at the All-Japan Judo Championships (second only behind Yasuhiro Yamashita), and set a record of seven medals at the World Judo Championships. Ogawa won the silver medal in the +95 kg judo weight class at the 1992 Summer Olympics.

Ogawa is also known for his career in professional wrestling, where he primarily worked for New Japan Pro-Wrestling (NJPW), and took part in one of the promotion's most high-profile feuds of the 1990s with Shinya Hashimoto. Ogawa was also professional wrestling's two-time National Wrestling Alliance World's Heavyweight Champion.

== Life and judo career ==
Ogawa first started in judo in his high school years. He continued on in college attending Meiji University in 1986. In his second year at school he became a world freeclass champion, the youngest in the history of judo. He won many more championships before graduating from the College of Business Administration at Meiji University, setting a record of seven medals at the World Judo Championships. He also gained a total of seven medals at the All-Japan Judo Championships in two separate winning streaks, from 1989 to 1993 and from 1995 to 96, second only to Yasuhiro Yamashita's nine medals. Ogawa was a silver medalist in judo of 1992 Summer Olympics and fifth at the 1996 Summer Olympics.

He was known for his slow, cerebral style of judo, nicknamed "Three Minutes Judo" (3分間柔道, 3-Funkan Judo) due to his usual strategy of investing the first three minutes in pressing on his opponent before trying to score. Due to this, Japanese specialized press often criticized him as lacking heart. When finding an opening, Ogawa would favor uchi mata, kosoto gari, kosoto gake, sasae tsurikomi ashi, tai otoshi and sukui nage, sometimes using a controversial standing ude gatame entry to set up sasae tsurikomi ashi and hiza guruma. He was not a user of newaza, preferring to attempt only osaekomi-waza from failed throws.

His performance at the 1996 Olympics would be criticized and led to Ogawa's retirement from professional judo.

Ogawa's record in international judo competition was 47 wins and 9 losses from 1987 to 1996.

Ogawa runs a judo school in Chigasaki, Kanagawa Prefecture, Japan, where he trains potential Olympians and Paralympians in his network of dojos.

== Professional wrestling career ==
In 1997, Ogawa was recruited by Antonio Inoki, chairman of New Japan Pro-Wrestling, for his UFO (Universal Fighting-Arts Organization) project. He was put to train under Satoru Sayama, legendary professional wrestler and mixed martial arts pioneer.

=== New Japan Pro-Wrestling (1997–2001) ===
Ogawa made his debut in NJPW on April 12, 1997 at the Tokyo Dome, replacing the stipulated Ken Shamrock as the opponent for Shinya Hashimoto, then IWGP Heavyweight Championship titleholder. In a shocking upset, Ogawa defeated Hashimoto by choke, which put him in the spotlight and gained him a title shot at May 3. This time Ogawa was defeated by kick to the head, with Shinya retaining his title. This marked the beginning of their feud, which would extend for years.

Through 1997 and 1998, Ogawa wrestled for NJPW as part of "Different Style Fights", meeting wrestlers with legit backgrounds like Ogawa and Hashimoto themselves. He defeated shoot-style wrestler Kazuo Yamazaki, arm wrestler Scott Norton, Ultimate Fighting Championship exponents Brian Johnston and Don Frye, and Dutch martial artist Erwin Vreeker. His only loss came from The Great Muta, via Muta's signature Asian mist dirty trick. In March 1998, Ogawa took part in the Inoki Final Tournament, but he was eliminated by Frye at the finals after beating Johnston and Dave Beneteau. In order to bounce back from the defeat, he started a special training, and ditched his trusted judogi for black tights, boots and fingerless gloves.

On January 4, 1999, Ogawa was involved with one of the most controversial moments in NJPW history. During his anticipated rubber match with Shinya Hashimoto, Ogawa broke kayfabe and shot on Hashimoto, attacking him for real and leaving him downed and bloodied with kicks and stomps. The NJPW and UFO crews flooded the ring and a legitimate fracas erupted, with Ogawa's cornerman Kazunari Murakami having to be hospitalized by a beatdown by Takashi Iizuka and Naoya himself being slapped by NJPW executive Riki Choshu. During all the brawl, Ogawa taunted the crowd and the wrestlers, having to be accompanied out of the arena by his bodyguard Gerard Gordeau. Many years later, in August 2021, Ogawa confessed he had been pressed by Antonio Inoki into shooting on Hashimoto in order to hijack the match and increase his popularity.

In May, Ogawa traveled to United States and defeated Gary Steele to win the NWA World Heavyweight Championship. Hashimoto followed him to the country and attacked him (kayfabe this time) in a press conference, challenging him to a title match in Japan with Tatsumi Fujinami as special referee. Naoya toured through United States, retaining the title before Dan Severn, Doug Gilbert and Biggie Biggs, trading it with Steele in a three-way match that also involved Brian Anthony on September 25, 1999, and finally coming back to Japan to meet Hashimoto. They faced on October 10 at the Tokyo Dome, with Ogawa winning the bout.

On January 4, 2000, one year after their incident, Ogawa and Murakami faced off against Hashimoto and Takashi Iizuka in a special match. Unfortunately, it became a real fight again when Murakami knocked Iizuka out legitimately with a stiff head kick, causing the teams to brawl in the ring again. Under Antonio Inoki's eye, the match was restarted, with Ogawa's team losing when Iizuka choked out Murakami.

After a tense alliance between them formed for the Rikidozan Memorial, Hashimoto challenged Ogawa to a last match, in which Hashimoto would retire from professional wrestling if he lost. Ogawa and Hashimoto fought the last time of their careers on April 7 at the Tokyo Dome, where Naoya defeated Hashimoto by KO after several iterations of his Space Tornado Ogawa technique. His opponent carried out and performed a retirement ceremony, while Inoki and other tried to convince him not to do it; even Ogawa declared in a segment that he repented having finished off the career of his rival.

Ogawa vacated the NWA title on July 2, 2000 in order to focus on training for his fight against Rickson Gracie, which never took place.

=== Pro Wrestling Zero-One (2001–2004) ===
In 2001, after Shinya Hashimoto founded Pro Wrestling Zero-One, Ogawa left NJPW and moved in, forming a tag team with his former rival which was called "OH Gun". Their beginning together was harsh, but they eventually got along and won the NWA Intercontinental Tag Team Championship from the UPW team of Jon Heidenreich and Nathan Jones. Ogawa and Hashimoto, along with the rest of native wrestlers of Zero-One, entered in a feud with the foreign wrestlers, led by Tom Howard and Steve Corino.

=== Hustle (2004–2007) ===
In 2004, Ogawa took part in the foundation of the sports entertainment promotion Hustle, a combined effort between Zero-One and mixed martial arts league Pride Fighting Championships. Ogawa opened the storyline of Hustle during a staged press conference with Pride chairman Nobuyuki Sakakibara. During the interview, Sakakibara criticized professional wrestling and declared it inferior to MMA, which turned Ogawa furious. With Nobuhiko Takada acting on behalf of Sakakibara and Shinya Hashimoto backing Ogawa, it was decided they would prove their postures in an event where MMA fighters would face professional wrestling representatives. Ogawa himself would be slated to wrestle Bill Goldberg, who had been introduced by Takada as his champion. However, the night of the event turned sour as, although Ogawa managed to overpower Goldberg, Takada ordered Giant Silva to attack Ogawa and distract him to be finished off by Goldberg.

At the second Hustle event, when Takada proclaimed himself Generalissimo Takada, leader of the villainous Monster Army, and declared his goal was to destroy professional wrestling, Ogawa and Hashimoto founded Hustle Army, a union of professional wrestlers bent on protecting their guild. Ogawa became the leader of the army, being nicknamed "Captain Hustle" and debuting a characteristic hip thrust gesture to chant Hustle's name. Although his first match was a loss, being pinned by Matt Ghaffari with the help of several Monster Army members, he bounced back by summoning several high level wrestlers, among them Riki Choshu and Toshiaki Kawada, to help him and Hashimoto.

In September, after Ogawa lost to Fedor Emelianenko in 54 second at a Pride event, Takada started a mocking campaign against him and banned him from competing in Hustle for 54 days. In order to overcome this ban, Ogawa disguised himself as "Captain O", a masked gimmick based on Hulk Hogan's Mr. America persona, whom Ogawa claimed was the true Hogan in disguise. Deducting Captain O was really Ogawa, Takada's second-in-command Commander An Jo sent several Monster Army wrestlers to capture and tie him up, but O escaped by shedding this gimmick and adopting yet another, "Judo O", where he would wear a blue judogi along with his mask. Judo O teamed up with Hustle Rikishi to defeat Takada's slave Hakushi and a one night mercenary named Russian 54.

After Ogawa returned to the ring, Hustle co-produced a show along with Michinoku Pro Wrestling, whose star The Great Sasuke was inducted in the Hustle Army.

In 2007, Ogawa disappeared from the Hustle Army and sided shockingly with Takada. Ogawa changed his persona to an arrogant socialite gimmick and called himself "Monster Celebrity", wearing sunglasses and ornated coats. Takada explained Ogawa had been brainwashed by him to turn him in one of his henchmen, and he proved Ogawa's newfound loyalty by sending him to attack Hustle Army member Banzai Chie. This storyline was written in order to explain Ogawa's departure from Hustle, as he had signed up with Antonio Inoki's new promotion, Inoki Genome Federation.

=== Inoki Genome Federation (2007–2015) ===
Ogawa worked for Inoki Genome Federation until his retirement in 2015.

== Mixed martial arts career ==
=== First ventures ===
Ogawa had his first MMA fight the same year of his debut in NJPW, taking part in an event promoted by Chris Dolman in Holland in which he faced Rens Vrolijk. Ogawa submitted him relatively fast, throwing him to the mat and choking him out.

His first high level match, however, would be for Pride Fighting Championships at the event Pride 6 against the kickboxer and Ultimate Fighting Championship veteran Gary Goodridge. Naoya evidenced his lack of MMA experience when he suffered heavy blows and almost failed his first morote gari, but he eventually took Goodridge down and gained dominant position as expected. Ogawa immediately tried several submissions, and although he didn't manage to lock them, he kept his stronger opponent busy through the round. At the second one, Ogawa swept Goodridge down and finally locked an ude-garami, making him tap out.

It was rumored that Goodridge had been paid to throw the fight, but Gary himself said in an interview that, although he was effectively proposed an anonymous money bribe to let Ogawa win, he rejected it and fought for real, thus losing legitimately to Ogawa. He added that PRIDE executive Nobuyuki Sakakibara had promised him "to write his own ticket" if he defeated Ogawa in order to increase his motivation.

In 2000, Ogawa took part in negotiations with Rickson Gracie for a match between them at the Colosseum promotion, in which Gracie had just defeated Masakatsu Funaki. With the fight scheduled for the next year, Ogawa vacated his NWA World Heavyweight Championship in order to focus in his fight with Gracie, but all the plans were suspended upon the news of the death of Rickson's son Rockson and the event never had place.

=== Main competition ===
Ogawa returned to Pride at Pride 11 - Battle of the Rising Sun, facing world karate cup champion Masaaki Satake in which was called a classic style vs. style matchup. Satake had recently defeated Kazunari Murakami, Naoya's former teammate, so the match sported a shade of revenge as well. During the bout, Satake opened the action with punches and kicks, avoiding Ogawa's takedowns but at the same time being unable to land decisive blows, while Ogawa threw punches as well in an attempt to keep the pace. At the second round, however, Ogawa took over, cutting the karateka's eye with a hard punch and swiftly taking him down for a rear naked choke.

In 2002, Naoya participated in the first event of Universal Fighting-Arts Organization against another Olympic medalist, the Greco-Roman wrestling champion Matt Ghaffari, who had claimed he would knock Ogawa out with knee strikes. However, the match transpired quite different, as although Ghaffari did take Ogawa down in an instance, Ogawa controlled the standing exchanges. After one minute and thirty seconds, the judoka landed a right punch that made Ghaffari stumble and fall, and the wrestler decided to tap out before receiving further damage. Rickson Gracie attended the event and was invited to train with Ogawa, which led to new talks about the possibility of a match with Naoya, but it did not happen either.

Two years after, Ogawa took part in the PRIDE Grand Prix tournament as a representative of his home pro wrestling promotion HUSTLE. His first opponent was K-1 veteran and MMA debutant Stefan Leko, whom Naoya shockingly knocked down with a punch before submitting him to an arm triangle choke. Ogawa's next match was against fellow HUSTLE wrestler Giant Silva, who outweighed him by 130 pounds, but the judoka took him down and rained ground and pound for the referee stoppage. His last match in the tournament, a matchup decided by fan voting, was against then PRIDE World Heavyweight Champion and eventual tournament winner Fedor Emelianenko. Fedor overpowered Ogawa and submitted him by armbar in just 54 seconds, giving him his first MMA loss.

=== Retirement fight ===
Ogawa's last fight in mixed martial arts was at PRIDE Shockwave 2005 against the man who took from him the world judo championships the last time they fought, Hidehiko Yoshida. The bout was highly anticipated and became one of the most expensive fights in MMA history, with Ogawa and Yoshida being both paid US$2 million. The fight was a difficult perspective for Ogawa, as he was clearly behind in training and experience: while Yoshida had focused on MMA since 2002, Ogawa had fought only occasionally aside from his work in the pro wrestling circuit.

Ogawa made his entrance to the arena with the hachimaki and music theme of his late friend Shinya Hashimoto as a tribute and proof of motivation, while Yoshida took off his usual gi after making his own entrance. Started the battle, they fought on the clinch before Yoshida managed to trip Ogawa down with kouchi gari. Yoshida locked an ankle hold that broke Ogawa's ankle, but the Hustle wrestler escaped, and then an exchange of reversions and ground and pound took place. At the end, Ogawa looked to have dominant position, but Yoshida locked an armbar from the guard by surprise, winning the fight.

== Mixed martial arts record ==
Professional record breakdown
9 matches	7 wins	2 losses
By knockout	2	0
By submission	5	2

Res.	Record	Opponent	Method	Event	Date	Round	Time	Location	Notes
Loss	7–2	Hidehiko Yoshida	Submission (armbar)	PRIDE Shockwave 2005	December 31, 2005	1	6:04	Saitama, Japan	
Loss	7–1	Fedor Emelianenko	Submission (armbar)	PRIDE Final Conflict 2004	August 15, 2004	1	0:54	Saitama, Japan	
Win	7–0	Paulo Cesar Silva	TKO (punches)	PRIDE Critical Countdown 2004	June 20, 2004	1	3:29	Saitama, Japan	
Win	6–0	Stefan Leko	Submission (arm-triangle choke)	PRIDE Total Elimination 2004	April 25, 2004	1	1:34	Saitama, Japan	
Win	5–0	Matt Ghaffari	TKO (punches)	UFO: Legend	August 8, 2002	1	0:56	Tokyo, Japan	
Win	4–0	Masaaki Satake	Submission (rear-naked choke)	Pride 11 - Battle of the Rising Sun	October 31, 2000	2	2:01	Osaka, Japan	
Win	3–0	Rob Peters	Submission	UFO Europe: Free Fight Gala	November 28, 1999	N/A	N/A	Kijkduin, Holland	
Win	2–0	Gary Goodridge	Submission (americana)	Pride 6	July 4, 1999	2	0:36	Yokohama, Japan	
Win	1–0	Rens Vrolijk	Submission (rear-naked choke)	Red Devil Free Fight 1	September 27, 1997	1	2:51	Amsterdam, Holland	

== Personal life ==
His son, Yusei Ogawa, is also a judoka. He won the mixed team gold medal at the 2018 World Judo Championships, representing Japan.

== Championships and accomplishments ==
=== Mixed martial arts ===
- PRIDE Fighting Championships
  - 2004 PRIDE Heavyweight Grand Prix Semifinalist

=== Professional wrestling ===
- NWA Northeast
  - NWA World Heavyweight Championship (1 time)
- New Japan Pro-Wrestling
  - NWA World Heavyweight Championship (1 time)
- Pro Wrestling Illustrated
  - PWI ranked him #152 of the top 500 singles wrestlers in the PWI 500 in 2010
  - PWI ranked him #302 of the 500 best singles wrestlers of the PWI Years in 2003
- Pro Wrestling ZERO-ONE
  - NWA Intercontinental Tag Team Championship (2 times) – with Shinya Hashimoto
  - ZERO-ONE United States Heavyweight Championship (1 time)
- Tokyo Sports
  - Fighting Spirit Award (1999)
  - Topic Award (1997)

== Filmography ==
=== Film ===
- The Wolverine (2013) – Yakuza 1

=== Television ===
- Doraemon Haha ni Naru: Ōyama Nobuyo Monogatari (2015) – Kazuya Tatekabe

== See also ==
- Hidehiko Yoshida
- List of male mixed martial artists
- List of multi-sport athletes
- List of multi-sport champions
