= Rafał Kubacki =

Polish judoka (born 1967)

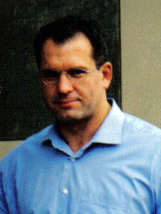

Medal record

Representing Poland
Event	1st	2nd	3rd
Olympic Games	0	0	0
World Championships	2	0	1
European Championships	1	2	5
Total	3	2	6

Men's Judo

World Championships
Gold medal – first place	1993 Hamilton	Open
Gold medal – first place	1997 Paris	Open
Bronze medal – third place	1989 Belgrade	+95 kg

European Championships
Gold medal – first place	1989 Helsinki	+95 kg
Silver medal – second place	1994 Gdansk	+95 kg
Silver medal – second place	1998 Oviedo	+100 kg
Bronze medal – third place	1991 Prague	+95 kg
Bronze medal – third place	1993 Athens	+95 kg
Bronze medal – third place	1995 Birmingham	+95 kg
Bronze medal – third place	1996 The Hague	+95 kg
Bronze medal – third place	1997 Ostend	+95 kg

Rafał Andrzej Kubacki (born 23 March 1967 in Wrocław) is a Polish judoka.

He is known from his role as Ursus (Lygia's huge bodyguard) in Quo Vadis (2001 film) directed by Jerzy Kawalerowicz.

He has also entered politics; first as a member of the "Samoobrona" ("Self-Defense Party"), he now represents Polish People's Party (PSL). He has been unsuccessful in his bid to be the president (mayor) of Wrocław.

== Achievements ==
Year	Tournament	Place	Weight class
2000	European Judo Championships	5th	Open class
1999	World Judo Championships	5th	Heavyweight (+100 kg)
1998	European Judo Championships	2nd	Heavyweight (+100 kg)
1997	World Judo Championships	7th	Heavyweight (+95 kg)
1997	World Judo Championships	1st	Open class
1997	European Judo Championships	3rd	Heavyweight (+95 kg)
1996	European Judo Championships	3rd	Heavyweight (+95 kg)
1995	European Judo Championships	3rd	Heavyweight (+95 kg)
1994	European Judo Championships	2nd	Heavyweight (+95 kg)
1993	World Judo Championships	5th	Heavyweight (+95 kg)
1993	World Judo Championships	1st	Open class
1993	European Judo Championships	3rd	Heavyweight (+95 kg)
1993	European Judo Championships	7th	Open class
1991	European Judo Championships	3rd	Heavyweight (+95 kg)
1989	World Judo Championships	3rd	Heavyweight (+95 kg)
1989	European Judo Championships	1st	Heavyweight (+95 kg)
