= Hidehiko Yoshida =

Japanese judoka and mixed martial artist

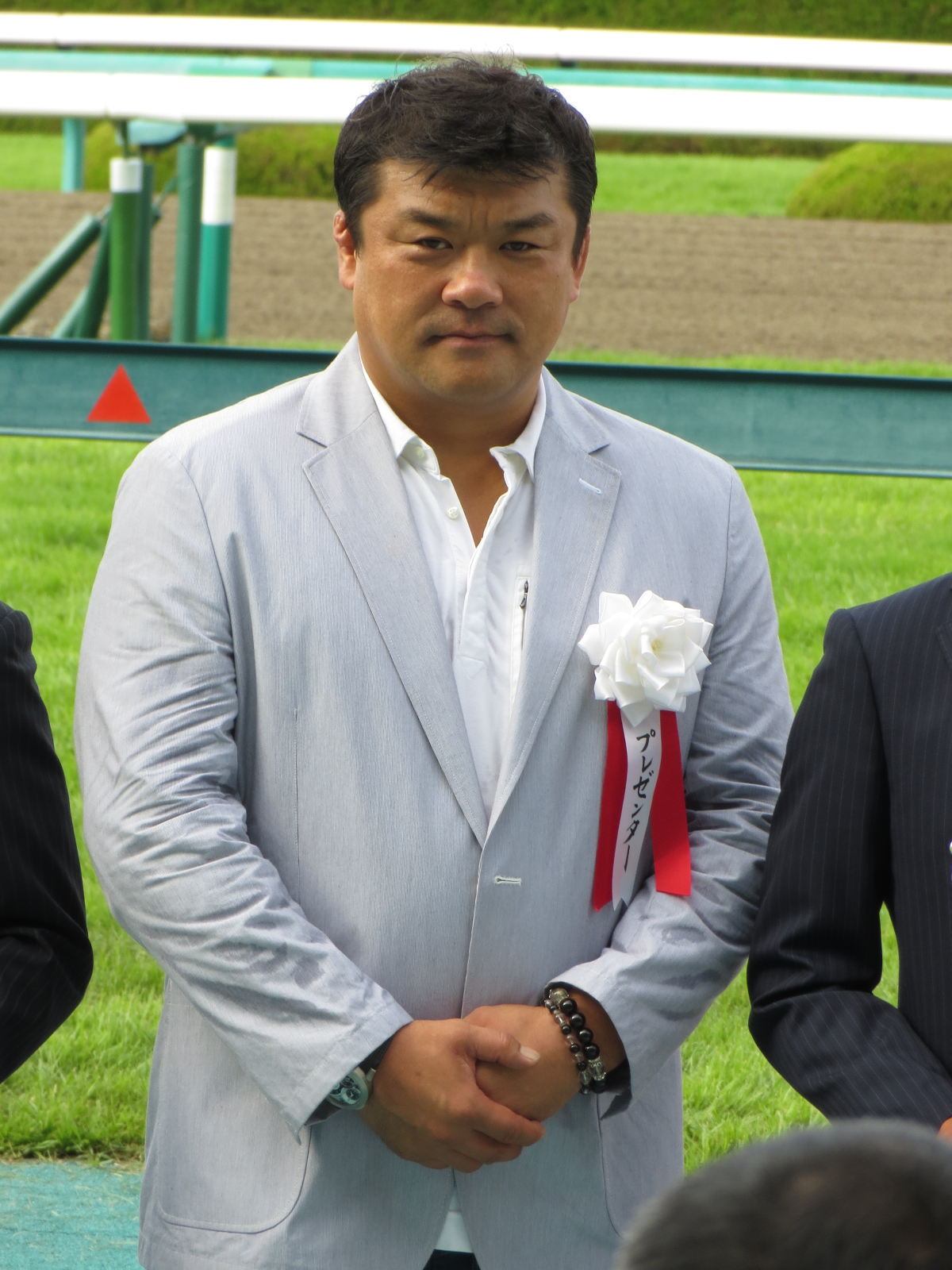
- Hidehiko Yoshida in 2013
- Born: September 3, 1969 (age 57); Obu, Aichi, Japan
- Other names: Kogane no Judo O ("The Golden Judo King")
- Nationality: Japanese
- Height: 5 ft 11 in (180 cm)
- Weight: 225 lb (102 kg; 16 st 1 lb)
- Division: Light heavyweight Heavyweight
- Style: MMA; Judo
- Years active: 2002–2010 (MMA)

Mixed martial arts record
- Total: 18
- Wins: 9
- By submission: 8
- By decision: 1
- Losses: 8
- By knockout: 2
- By submission: 1
- By decision: 5
- Draws: 1

Other information
- Mixed martial arts record from Sherdog
- Judo career
- Weight class: ‍–‍78 kg, ‍–‍86 kg, ‍–‍90 kg
- Rank: 6th dan black belt
- Club: Yoshida Dojo

Judo achievements and titles
- Olympic Games: (gold) (1992)
- World Champ.: (gold) (1999)
- Asian Champ.: (gold) (1988)
Medal record
Men's judo
Representing Japan
Olympic Games
Gold medal – first place	1992 Barcelona	‍–‍78 kg
World Championships
Gold medal – first place	1999 Birmingham	‍–‍90 kg
Silver medal – second place	1993 Hamilton	‍–‍78 kg
Silver medal – second place	1995 Chiba	‍–‍86 kg
Bronze medal – third place	1991 Barcelona	‍–‍78 kg
Asian Championships
Gold medal – first place	1988 Damascus	‍–‍78 kg

Profile at external judo databases
- IJF: 12668
- JudoInside.com: 2992

Hidehiko Yoshida (吉田 秀彦, Yoshida Hidehiko; born September 3, 1969) is a Japanese gold-medalist judoka and retired mixed martial artist. He is a longtime veteran of Japan's PRIDE Fighting Championships, competing in the middleweight (93kg) and heavyweight divisions. He won gold at the 1992 Summer Olympic Games at ‍–‍78 kg. Yoshida also had two famous fights with MMA pioneer Royce Gracie that resulted in a win by technical knockout and a time-limit draw.

== Judo career ==
Yoshida first came onto the judo scene at the 1991 World Judo Championships in Barcelona, taking third place at 78 kg. He then took gold in the 1991 All Japan Judo Championships and 1992 A-Tournament in Sofia before entering the 1992 Summer Olympic Games. He swept the competition in Barcelona, winning all six matches by Ippon en route to his first Olympic gold medal. He went on to medal in the 1993, 1995 and 1999 World Championships, but didn't win gold at the Olympics again. He finished in fifth place at the 1996 Summer Games and ninth at the 2000 Summer Games. He retired from Judo after the 2000 Summer Games.

== Mixed martial arts career ==
In 2002, Yoshida turned fully his attention to the world of mixed martial arts, where he had already worked as a color commentator, and signed up with Pride Fighting Championship to become a fighter. He accepted the premise of having to fight high level opponents, wanting to avoid implications that he was transitioning to MMA for not being competitive enough for judo anymore. He also vowed to compete in a judogi in order to draw interest to judo as a martial art. Yoshida later founded the team Yoshida Dojo, which focuses both in judo and MMA.

=== PRIDE Fighting Championships ===
==== Bout with Gracie ====
Yoshida had his first appearance in Pride in a special grappling match against UFC pioneer Royce Gracie at PRIDE Shockwave. The rules of the match would feature limited striking to the body while standing and no judges decision, and would require both to use a gi. This ruleset had been proposed by Royce due to the 50th anniversary of the Masahiko Kimura vs. Hélio Gracie fight, and as such the bout was touted as another "judo vs. Brazilian jiu-jitsu" contest. As Yoshida wasn't a ne-waza expert, he prepared his submission skills with close friend and fellow judoka Tsuyoshi Kohsaka. Odds were stacked against him in popular perception, and Mário Sperry predicted Royce would not have a problem with Yoshida on the ground.

Started the fight, Royce immediately pulled guard in order to avoid Yoshida's powerful nage-waza, frustrating his initial gameplan of entering the ground through a throw. The Brazilian fighter attempted an armbar from his back, but Hidehiko blocked it and looked for a gi choke, so Gracie switched to a heel hook. After a stagnant leglock exchange between the two grapplers, action was restarted on the feet. Gracie pulled guard again, but Yoshida turned the action into a daki age, advanced to Royce's half guard and tried a Kimura lock. Although the Brazilian managed to hold off the technique, the Japanese passed his guard with a brief struggle and gained side control. Finally, the judoka fully mounted Gracie and executed a sode guruma jime. A moment of inactivity passed, and then Yoshida asked referee Daisuke Noguchi if Royce was unconscious, as he couldn't see his face. Believing it to be so, Noguchi stopped the match and gave the victory to Yoshida.

Getting up at the moment, Royce protested the decision and went to physically assault the referee, causing a brief brawl between the contenders' cornermen on the ring. After the event, the Gracie family apologized but argued not only that Royce had not passed out, but also that the referee had not authority to stop the match anyway, and demanded the fight result to be changed to no contest. Slo-motion footage of the stoppage shows Gracie's chin out and his neck free from the choke resulting in both Stephen Quadros and Bas Rutten, longtime PRIDE FC commentators agreeing Gracie had not been choked out.

==== Regular competition ====
Yoshida's first true MMA bout came at PRIDE 23 against former UFC 8 Tournament Champion and UFC Ultimate Ultimate 1996 Tournament Champion Don Frye. During the match, Yoshida threw Frye down with ouchi gari and attempted again the sode guruma jime, but Frye escaped, so then Hidehiko executed an armbar, breaking Frye's arm when he refused to tap out. It marked the first time in six years that Frye had been defeated. Secondly, Yoshida submitted former world karate champion Masaaki Satake by neck crank at Inoki Bom-Ba-Ye.

At PRIDE Total Elimination 2003, Yoshida faced shoot-style ace Kiyoshi Tamura in the first round of the Middleweight Grand Prix Tournament. Yoshida was dominated for most of the first round, receiving leg kicks and punches from the veteran Tamura and having his back taken on the ground, but he eventually managed to throw down Tamura with harai goshi and performed a sode guruma jime for the tap out.

Yoshida's first loss was to the PRIDE Middleweight Champion Wanderlei Silva via unanimous decision at PRIDE Final Conflict 2003. Wanderlei had already knocked out Japanese fighters like Tamura and Kazushi Sakuraba, but Yoshida broke expectations when he gave a back-and-forth against Silva.

At the first round, the two fighters exchanged attacks both from and against the guard, with Silva landing knees on the feet and Yoshida pressing with a neck crank, while at the second, Wanderlei blocked Yoshida's takedown attempts and scored violent head kicks and knees, only for Yoshida to absorb most of the most punishment and even stay at punching range in order to trade with him. The match ended with Silva knocking down Yoshida and getting swept in return for a final assault. The judges gave the decision to the Brazilian fighter, and the match itself earned Fight of the Year honors from Wrestling Observer Newsletter.

In less than two months after his match with Wanderlei, still carrying injuries from the bout, Yoshida got in the rematch against Royce Gracie at PRIDE Shockwave 2003. The fight was this time under modified PRIDE rules, with a special referee in Matt Hume, two rounds of 10 minutes each, and no judges, meaning any indecisive ending would end on a draw. Royce, who fought this time without his gi top, caused controversy when he aimed three consecutive low blows on Yoshida, eventually scoring one that stopped the match for minutes. Finally able to continue fighting, Yoshida knocked down Royce with a combination and attacked him on the ground, besieging his half guard and coming to capture his back once. The Brazilian answered capitalizing on an armlock attempt to gain top position, ultimately taking back mount while hitting repeatedly the judoka with hammerfists. The second round saw an initial battle for an ankle lock, but it quickly returned to the last position, with Royce straddling a turtled down Yoshida and scoring strikes in the search of a submission. The match ended up and was ruled a draw as stipulated.

At PRIDE Critical Countdown 2004, Yoshida faced the debuting Mark Hunt, kickboxing champion and K-1 veteran, and a much heavier opponent. Yoshida almost finished the fight early with an armbar from the bottom, but Hunt blocked it by pressing on Hidehiko's throat with his knee. For the rest of the fight, Hidehiko tried leglocks, triangle chokes and armbars, with the kickboxer blocking all of them via raw strength and a makeshift submission defense, until Yoshida finally locked an armbar and won.

In 2004, after promoters failed at getting a rubber match with Royce Gracie as Yoshida wished, the judoka was left to face the similarly debuting Rulon Gardner. Gardner, Olympic gold medalist in Greco-Roman wrestling and much heavier than Hidehiko, performed unexpectedly and dominated Yoshida with stand-up for a unanimous decision.

In April 2005, Yoshida got a rematch against Wanderlei Silva in PRIDE Total Elimination. The fight was even closer than its first iteration, as Yoshida won the first round to the judges and kept himself mostly out of danger until the third round, but he lost again by decision. Yoshida recovered from the defeat submitting Tank Abbott at the next event with the judo technique known as kata-ha-jime.

At the end of the same year, Yoshida faced fellow Japanese judoka Naoya Ogawa and won by an armbar in a highly anticipated MMA bout at PRIDE Shockwave 2005 with each fighter receiving a payment of US$2 million, which remains one of the most expensive fights in MMA history. Yoshida and Ogawa had already clashed at the World Judo Championship, a contest which was won by Hidehiko in an upset, and a theme of revenge was played in this match. This time without their gis, Yoshida started the match throwing punches and taking Ogawa down, and then a long and aggressive exchange of reversions and ground and pound happened. At the end, Ogawa looked to have dominant position, but Yoshida locked an armbar from the guard by surprise, making his judo rival submit.

The next year, Yoshida took part in the PRIDE 2006 Heavyweight Grand Prix, being pitted first against boxing champion Yosuke Nishijima. As expected, the judo champion threw him down and mounted him, and when Nishijima attempted to sweep, he locked a triangle choke for the win. Hidehiko advanced round and faced master kickboxer and eventual winner Mirko Cro Cop. In a classic striker vs. grappler fashion, Yoshida attempted to throw Mirko to the mat, almost scoring a uchi mata off the corner in an instance, but the Croatian powered out of it and kept landing leg kicks. Though Yoshida avoided being knocked out as per Mirko's trademark, he eventually fell to accumulated damage to his legs, losing by TKO. Yoshida was helped out of the arena by Cro Cop himself.

Yoshida's last match in PRIDE was against James Thompson at the Shockwave 2006 event. Yoshida outboxed the much heavier British fighter and threatened him with several throw to armbar attempts, as well as some leglocks, but Thompson then featured a controversial moment for pushing Hidehiko between the ropes of the ring to the outside. Yoshida chose to return to the fight, but the fall had taken its toll on him, and Thompson overwhelmed him with punches and knees until knocking him out. The bout would have yet another controversial moment, as the referee didn't stop the match, and allowed James to strike further a barely conscious Yoshida for a late stoppage.

=== World Victory Road ===
In March 2008, Yoshida made his debut in World Victory Road at its inaugural show Sengoku against catch wrestling specialist and former training partner Josh Barnett. The bout saw highlights like Barnett scoring a suplex on Yoshida and Hidehiko returning the favour with a flying Kimura, but it also featured intensive ground action, as the two grappling experts exchanged submission attempts on the ground. Come the third round, when Hidehiko dropped to his knees to avoid another suplex, Barnett gained top position and performed a heel hook, making Yoshida tap out.

Yoshida also faced former UFC Heavyweight Champion Maurice Smith in the first round of Sengoku: Third Battle in June. It was a short affair, with Yoshida taking the fight to the ground, gaining a kesa-gatame position and performing a neck crank to submit the UFC champion.

On January 4, 2009 at World Victory Road Presents: Sengoku Rebellion 2009, Yoshida faced a fellow judoka and former Toshihiko Koga apprentice, Sanae Kikuta, who had defeated Yoshida's own trainee Makoto Takimoto in an earlier event. Having ditched the gi, the bout started slow, with Kikuta taking Yoshida down and tentatively exchanging strikes with him. At the second round, Kikuta opted for pulling guard and pursue an ankle lock, while Yoshida remained on top and landed several punches through his guard. Afterwards, however, Kikuta reversed and got the mount, unloading ground and pound until the end of the round. The third round saw Yoshida stunning Kikuta with a punch and scoring a judo throw, but the Koga trainee took his back and kept striking on him for the rest of the match, eventually winning the decision.

=== Last fights ===
Yoshida defeated Satoshi Ishii at Dynamite!! 2009. Ishii had been pursued by many of the best organizations in the world such as the UFC and Strikeforce, to name a few. Yoshida was a significant underdog but came out in the first round and dominated the less-experienced Ishii, landing many punches including a right overhand that staggered Ishii, as well as a series of uppercuts and knees from the clinch. Ishii somewhat found his range in the second round from the clinch, but then landed an illegal knee to the groin of Yoshida, which hurt the veteran. Yoshida needed his protective cup replaced but ultimately continued to fight. Later, toward the end of the second round, he was taken down, and in the third round, he continued to absorb numerous strikes from Ishii. Nonetheless, Yoshida won via unanimous decision.

To commemorate his retirement, Yoshida participated in an event called ASTRA for his last fight on April 25, 2010, as a response to his frustration with his previous promotion. Yoshida lost the fight via unanimous decision to Kazuhiro Nakamura, a long-time student of his dojo.

== Personal life ==
Yoshida is a graduate of Meiji University where he was part of the Judo Club.

In 2000, he founded the "Yoshida Dojo". It is a mixed martial arts academy based in Tokyo, Japan that focuses on judo. Many members, including Yoshida, have participated in both judo and mixed martial arts. The dojo is promoted and managed by J-Rock Management and Viva Judo! Entertainment.

== Championships and accomplishments ==
=== Judo ===
- 1992 Barcelona Olympic Games 78 kg class gold medalist
- 1996 Atlanta Olympic Games 86 kg class 5th place
- 2000 Sydney Olympic Games 90 kg class 9th place
- 1999 World Judo Championship 90 kg class gold medalist
- 1995 World Judo Championship 86 kg class silver medalist
- 1993 World Judo Championship 78 kg class silver medalist
- 1991 World Judo Championship 78 kg class bronze medalist

=== Mixed martial arts ===
- PRIDE Fighting Championships
  - 2003 PRIDE Middleweight Grand Prix Semifinalist
- Tokyo Sports
  - Topic Award (2002)
- Wrestling Observer Newsletter
  - Fight of the Year (2003) vs. Wanderlei Silva on November 9

== Mixed martial arts record ==
Professional record breakdown
18 matches	9 wins	8 losses
By knockout	0	2
By submission	8	1
By decision	1	5
Draws	1	

Res.	Record	Opponent	Method	Event	Date	Round	Time	Location	Notes
Loss	9–8–1	Kazuhiro Nakamura	Decision (unanimous)	ASTRA: Yoshida's Farewell	April 25, 2010	3	5:00	Tokyo, Japan	Retirement bout
Win	9–7–1	Satoshi Ishii	Decision (unanimous)	Dynamite!! The Power of Courage 2009	December 31, 2009	3	5:00	Saitama, Japan	
Loss	8–7–1	Sanae Kikuta	Decision (split)	World Victory Road Presents: Sengoku no Ran 2009	January 4, 2009	3	5:00	Saitama, Japan	
Win	8–6–1	Maurice Smith	Submission (neck crank)	World Victory Road Presents: Sengoku 3	June 8, 2008	1	3:23	Saitama, Japan	
Loss	7–6–1	Josh Barnett	Submission (heel hook)	World Victory Road Presents: Sengoku First Battle	March 5, 2008	3	3:23	Tokyo, Japan	
Loss	7–5–1	James Thompson	TKO (punches)	Pride FC - Shockwave 2006	December 31, 2006	1	7:50	Saitama, Japan	
Loss	7–4–1	Mirko Cro Cop	TKO (leg kicks)	Pride FC - Critical Countdown Absolute	July 1, 2006	1	7:38	Saitama, Japan	PRIDE 2006 Openweight Grand Prix Quarter-Final.
Win	7–3–1	Yosuke Nishijima	Submission (triangle choke)	Pride FC - Total Elimination Absolute	May 5, 2006	1	2:33	Osaka, Japan	PRIDE 2006 Openweight Grand Prix Opening Round.
Win	6–3–1	Naoya Ogawa	Submission (armbar)	PRIDE Shockwave 2005	December 31, 2005	1	6:04	Saitama, Japan	
Win	5–3–1	Tank Abbott	Submission (single wing choke)	PRIDE Final Conflict 2005	August 28, 2005	1	7:40	Saitama, Japan	
Loss	4–3–1	Wanderlei Silva	Decision (split)	PRIDE Total Elimination 2005	April 23, 2005	3	5:00	Osaka, Japan	PRIDE 2005 Middleweight Grand Prix Opening Round.
Loss	4–2–1	Rulon Gardner	Decision (unanimous)	PRIDE Shockwave 2004	December 31, 2004	3	5:00	Saitama, Japan	
Win	4–1–1	Mark Hunt	Submission (armbar)	PRIDE Critical Countdown 2004	June 20, 2004	1	5:25	Saitama, Japan	
Draw	3–1–1	Royce Gracie	Draw (time limit)	PRIDE Shockwave 2003	December 31, 2003	2	10:00	Saitama, Japan	Match under special rules.
Loss	3–1	Wanderlei Silva	Decision (unanimous)	PRIDE Final Conflict 2003	November 9, 2003	2	5:00	Tokyo, Japan	PRIDE 2003 Middleweight Grand Prix Semi-Final. Fight of the Year (2003).
Win	3–0	Kiyoshi Tamura	Submission (Ezekiel choke)	PRIDE Total Elimination 2003	August 10, 2003	1	5:06	Saitama, Japan	PRIDE 2003 Middleweight Grand Prix Opening Round.
Win	2–0	Masaaki Satake	Submission (neck crank)	Inoki Bom-Ba-Ye 2002	December 31, 2002	1	0:50	Saitama, Japan	
Win	1–0	Don Frye	Technical Submission (armbar)	PRIDE 23	November 24, 2002	1	5:32	Tokyo, Japan	

== See also ==
- Pride Fighting Championships
- List of male mixed martial artists
