= Judo at the 1996 Summer Olympics =

Judo Judo at the Games of the XXVI Olympiad
- Venue: Georgia World Congress Center
- Location: Atlanta, Georgia, United States
- Dates: 20 to 26 July 1996
- Competitors: 386 from 91 nations

Competition at external databases
- Links: IJF • JudoInside

This page shows the final results of the Judo competition at the 1996 Summer Olympics in Atlanta.

== Medal table ==
Rank	Nation	Gold	Silver	Bronze	Total
1	Japan	3	4	1	8
2	France	3	0	3	6
3	South Korea	2	4	2	8
4	Cuba	1	1	4	6
5	Belgium	1	1	2	4
6	Poland	1	1	0	2
7	Germany	1	0	4	5
8	China	1	0	1	2
9	North Korea	1	0	0	1
10	Spain	0	1	2	3
11	Italy	0	1	1	2
12	Uzbekistan	0	1	0	1
13	Netherlands	0	0	3	3
14	Brazil	0	0	2	2
15	Georgia	0	0	1	1
15	Mongolia	0	0	1	1
15	United States	0	0	1	1
Totals (17 entries)		14	14	28	56

== Medal summary ==
=== Men's events ===
Games	Gold	Silver	Bronze
Extra lightweight 60 kg	Tadahiro Nomura; Japan	Girolamo Giovinazzo; Italy	Richard Trautmann; Germany
Extra lightweight 60 kg	Tadahiro Nomura; Japan	Girolamo Giovinazzo; Italy	Dorjpalamyn Narmandakh; Mongolia
Half lightweight 65 kg	Udo Quellmalz; Germany	Yukimasa Nakamura; Japan	Israel Hernández; Cuba
Half lightweight 65 kg	Udo Quellmalz; Germany	Yukimasa Nakamura; Japan	Henrique Guimarães; Brazil
Lightweight; 71 kg	Kenzo Nakamura; Japan	Kwak Dae-sung; South Korea	Christophe Gagliano; France
Lightweight; 71 kg	Kenzo Nakamura; Japan	Kwak Dae-sung; South Korea	Jimmy Pedro; United States
Half middleweight 78 kg	Djamel Bouras; France	Toshihiko Koga; Japan	Soso Liparteliani; Georgia
Half middleweight 78 kg	Djamel Bouras; France	Toshihiko Koga; Japan	Cho In-chul; South Korea
Middleweight; 86 kg	Jeon Ki-young; South Korea	Armen Bagdasarov; Uzbekistan	Marko Spittka; Germany
Middleweight; 86 kg	Jeon Ki-young; South Korea	Armen Bagdasarov; Uzbekistan	Mark Huizinga; Netherlands
Half heavyweight 95 kg	Paweł Nastula; Poland	Kim Min-soo; South Korea	Stéphane Traineau; France
Half heavyweight 95 kg	Paweł Nastula; Poland	Kim Min-soo; South Korea	Aurélio Miguel; Brazil
Heavyweight +95 kg	David Douillet; France	Ernesto Pérez; Spain	Frank Möller; Germany
Heavyweight +95 kg	David Douillet; France	Ernesto Pérez; Spain	Harry Van Barneveld; Belgium

=== Women's events ===
Games	Gold	Silver	Bronze
Extra lightweight 48 kg	Kye Sun-hui; North Korea	Ryoko Tamura; Japan	Yolanda Soler; Spain
Extra lightweight 48 kg	Kye Sun-hui; North Korea	Ryoko Tamura; Japan	Amarilis Savon; Cuba
Half lightweight 52 kg	Marie-Claire Restoux; France	Hyun Sook-hee; South Korea	Noriko Sugawara; Japan
Half lightweight 52 kg	Marie-Claire Restoux; France	Hyun Sook-hee; South Korea	Legna Verdecia; Cuba
Lightweight; 56 kg	Driulis González; Cuba	Jung Sun-yong; South Korea	Isabel Fernández; Spain
Lightweight; 56 kg	Driulis González; Cuba	Jung Sun-yong; South Korea	Marisbel Lomba; Belgium
Half middleweight 61 kg	Yuko Emoto; Japan	Gella Vandecaveye; Belgium	Jenny Gal; Netherlands
Half middleweight 61 kg	Yuko Emoto; Japan	Gella Vandecaveye; Belgium	Jung Sung-sook; South Korea
Middleweight; 66 kg	Cho Min-sun; South Korea	Aneta Szczepańska; Poland	Wang Xianbo; China
Middleweight; 66 kg	Cho Min-sun; South Korea	Aneta Szczepańska; Poland	Claudia Zwiers; Netherlands
Half heavyweight 72 kg	Ulla Werbrouck; Belgium	Yoko Tanabe; Japan	Ylenia Scapin; Italy
Half heavyweight 72 kg	Ulla Werbrouck; Belgium	Yoko Tanabe; Japan	Diadenis Luna; Cuba
Heavyweight +72 kg	Sun Fuming; China	Estela Rodríguez; Cuba	Johanna Hagn; Germany
Heavyweight +72 kg	Sun Fuming; China	Estela Rodríguez; Cuba	Christine Cicot; France

== Participating nations ==
- Algeria (6)
- Andorra (1)
- Argentina (8)
- Armenia (1)
- Australia (12)
- Austria (5)
- Azerbaijan (2)
- Barbados (1)
- Belarus (4)
- Belgium (7)
- Bosnia and Herzegovina (1)
- Brazil (12)
- Bulgaria (1)
- Canada (11)
- Cameroon (1)
- China (11)
- Chinese Taipei (10)
- Costa Rica (2)
- Cuba (12)
- Czech Republic (4)
- Dominican Republic (3)
- Egypt (2)
- El Salvador (2)
- Estonia (1)
- Fiji (1)
- Finland (1)
- France (14)
- Gabon (1)
- Georgia (6)
- Germany (13)
- Great Britain (13)
- Greece (1)
- Guatemala (2)
- Haiti (2)
- Honduras (3)
- Hong Kong (1)
- Hungary (7)
- Iceland (1)
- India (4)
- Indonesia (1)
- Iran (1)
- Ireland (2)
- Israel (2)
- Italy (9)
- Ivory Coast (2)
- Japan (14)
- Kazakhstan (8)
- Kuwait (2)
- Kyrgyzstan (2)
- Liechtenstein (1)
- Lithuania (1)
- Luxembourg (1)
- Malta (1)
- Mauritius (3)
- Mexico (2)
- Moldova (2)
- Mongolia (3)
- Monaco (1)
- Morocco (3)
- Netherlands (10)
- Netherlands Antilles (1)
- New Zealand (2)
- Nicaragua (2)
- Nigeria (1)
- North Korea (1)
- Paraguay (1)
- Poland (12)
- Portugal (5)
- Puerto Rico (4)
- Romania (5)
- Russia (13)
- San Marino (1)
- Senegal (2)
- FR Yugoslavia (2)
- Slovakia (2)
- South Africa (1)
- South Korea (11)
- Spain (9)
- Sweden (1)
- Switzerland (1)
- Tajikistan (3)
- Thailand (1)
- Tunisia (6)
- Turkey (6)
- Turkmenistan (2)
- Ukraine (3)
- United States (14)
- Uruguay (2)
- Uzbekistan (7)
- Venezuela (3)
- Vietnam (1)
