= List of flag bearers for Burkina Faso at the Olympics =

Burkina Faso at the Olympics
- IOC code: BUR
- NOC: Burkinabé National Olympic and Sports Committee
- Medals: Gold 0 Silver 0 Bronze 1 Total 1

Summer appearances
- 1972; 1976–1984; 1988; 1992; 1996; 2000; 2004; 2008; 2012; 2016; 2020; 2024

This is a list of flag bearers who have represented Burkina Faso at the Olympics.

Flag bearers carry the national flag of their country at the opening ceremony of the Olympic Games.

#	Event year	Season	Flag bearer	Sport	Ref.
1	1988	Summer	Sounaila Sagnon	Boxing	
2	1992	Summer	Franck Zio	Athletics	
3	1996	Summer	Franck Zio	Athletics	
4	2000	Summer	Sarah Tondé	Athletics	
5	2004	Summer	Mamadou Ouedraogo	Swimming	
6	2008	Summer	Aïssata Soulama	Athletics	
7	2012	Summer	Séverine Nébié	Judo	
8	2016	Summer	Rachid Sidibé	Judo	
9	2020	Summer	Angelika Ouedraogo	Swimming	
9	2020	Summer	Hugues Fabrice Zango	Athletics	
10	2024	Summer	Marthe Koala	Athletics	
10	2024	Summer	Hugues Fabrice Zango	Athletics	

== See also ==
- Burkina Faso at the Olympics
