= Judo at the 1992 Summer Olympics – Men's 60 kg =

Olympic judo tournament

Men's 60 kg at the Games of the XXV Olympiad
- Venue: Palau Blaugrana
- Date: 2 August 1992
- Competitors: 43 from 43 nations

Medalists
1st place, gold medalist(s)		Nazim Huseynov	Unified Team
2nd place, silver medalist(s)		Yoon Hyun	South Korea
3rd place, bronze medalist(s)		Tadanori Koshino	Japan
3rd place, bronze medalist(s)		Richard Trautmann	Germany

The men's 60kg competition in judo at the 1992 Summer Olympics in Barcelona was held on 2 August at the Palau Blaugrana. The gold medal was won by Nazim Huseynov of the Unified Team.

== Results ==
=== Main brackets ===
==== Pool A ====
Round of 64
Orlin Rusev (BUL)	RA
Nazim Huseynov (EUN)	IPO
Luis Martínez (PUR)	E
Marino Cattedra (ITA)	IPO
Rui Ludovino (POR)	YUK
Gilberto García (DOM)	E
Narinder Singh (IND)	E
Ahmed El-Sayed (EGY)	WAZ
Lee Kan (HKG)	E
Manfred Hiptmair (AUT)	KIK
Bosolo Mobando (COD)	IPO
Nonilobal Hien (BUR)	E

Round of 32
Nazim Huseynov (EUN)	IPO
Mamadou Bah (GUI)	RA
Marino Cattedra (ITA)	WIP
Antoni Molne (AND)	E
Rui Ludovino (POR)	E
Dashgombyn Battulga (MGL)	IPO
Carlos Sotillo (ESP)	E
Nigel Donohue (GBR)	WAZ
Ahmed El-Sayed (EGY)	E
Chen Cailiang (CHN)	KEI
Tadanori Koshino (JPN)	IPO
József Wágner (HUN)	RA
Manfred Hiptmair (AUT)	IPO
Vlado Paradžik (BIH)	E
Bosolo Mobando (COD)	E
Ali Heidar Ali Mohamed (KUW)	IPO

Round of 16
Nazim Huseynov (EUN)	IPO
Marino Cattedra (ITA)	RA
Dashgombyn Battulga (MGL)	CHU
Nigel Donohue (GBR)	E
Chen Cailiang (CHN)	RA
Tadanori Koshino (JPN)	IPO
Manfred Hiptmair (AUT)	YUS
Ali Heidar Ali Mohamed (KUW)	E

Quarterfinal
Nazim Huseynov (EUN)	SOG
Dashgombyn Battulga (MGL)	RA
Tadanori Koshino (JPN)	IPO
Manfred Hiptmair (AUT)	RA

Semifinal
Nazim Huseynov (EUN)	WAZ
Tadanori Koshino (JPN)	RB

==== Pool B ====
Round of 64
Richard Trautmann (GER)	IPO
Alberto Francini (SMR)	RB
Keith Gough (IRL)	WIP
Leonardo Salvucci (ARG)	E
Philippe Pradayrol (FRA)	YUS
Tony Okada (USA)	E
Charbel Chrabie (LIB)	E
Piotr Kamrowski (POL)	WIP
Willis García (VEN)	IPO
Jerry Dino (PHI)	E

Round of 32
Richard Trautmann (GER)	WAZ
Ewan Beaton (CAN)	RB
Keith Gough (IRL)	KOK
Francisco de Souza (ANG)	E
Philippe Pradayrol (FRA)	IPO
Salah Al-Humaidi (YEM)	E
Carlos Noriega (BOL)	E
Haldun Efemgil (TUR)	IPO
Piotr Kamrowski (POL)	IPO
Youssef Omar Isahak (DJI)	E
Shigueto Yamasaki Júnior (BRA)	YUS
Petr Šedivák (TCH)	E
Willis García (VEN)	IPO
Leyton Mafuta (ZAM)	E
Yoon Hyun (KOR)	CHU
Amit Lang (ISR)	RB

Round of 16
Richard Trautmann (GER)	IPO
Keith Gough (IRL)	RB
Philippe Pradayrol (FRA)	CHU
Haldun Efemgil (TUR)	E
Piotr Kamrowski (POL)	IPO
Shigueto Yamasaki Júnior (BRA)	E
Willis García (VEN)	RB
Yoon Hyun (KOR)	IPO

Quarterfinal
Richard Trautmann (GER)	IPO
Philippe Pradayrol (FRA)	RB
Piotr Kamrowski (POL)	RB
Yoon Hyun (KOR)	YUS

Semifinal
Richard Trautmann (GER)	RA
Yoon Hyun (KOR)	KOK

=== Repechages ===
==== Repechage A ====
Repechage round 1
Orlin Rusev (BUL)	IPO
Mamadou Bah (GUI)	E

Repechage round 2
Orlin Rusev (BUL)	E
Marino Cattedra (ITA)	WIP
József Wágner (HUN)	IPO
Chen Cailiang (CHN)	E

Repechage quarterfinal
Marino Cattedra (ITA)	E
Dashgombyn Battulga (MGL)	KEI
József Wágner (HUN)	IPO
Manfred Hiptmair (AUT)	E

Repechage semifinal
Dashgombyn Battulga (MGL)	E
József Wágner (HUN)	IPO

Repechage final
József Wágner (HUN)	E
Richard Trautmann (GER)	KOK (bronze)

==== Repechage B ====
Repechage round 1
Alberto Francini (SMR)	E
Ewan Beaton (CAN)	IPO

Repechage round 2
Ewan Beaton (CAN)	YUS
Keith Gough (IRL)	E
Amit Lang (ISR)	E
Willis García (VEN)	IPO

Repechage quarterfinal
Ewan Beaton (CAN)	E
Philippe Pradayrol (FRA)	IPO
Willis García (VEN)	KOK
Piotr Kamrowski (POL)	E

Repechage semifinal
Philippe Pradayrol (FRA)	WIP
Willis García (VEN)	E

Repechage final
Philippe Pradayrol (FRA)	E
Tadanori Koshino (JPN)	WIP (bronze)

=== Final ===
Final
Nazim Huseynov (EUN)	KOK (gold)
Yoon Hyun (KOR)	2nd place, silver medalist(s)

== Final classification ==
Rank	Name	Country
1	Nazim Huseynov	Unified Team
2	Yoon Hyun	South Korea
3T	Tadanori Koshino	Japan
3T	Richard Trautmann	Germany
5T	Philippe Pradayrol	France
5T	József Wágner	Hungary
7T	Dashgombyn Battulga	Mongolia
7T	Willis García	Venezuela
9T	Marino Cattedra	Italy
9T	Manfred Hiptmair	Austria
9T	Ewan Beaton	Canada
9T	Piotr Kamrowski	Poland
13T	Orlin Rusev	Bulgaria
13T	Chen Cailiang	China
13T	Keith Gough	Ireland
13T	Amit Lang	Israel
17T	Mamadou Bah	Guinea
17T	Alberto Francini	San Marino
19T	Nigel Donohue	Great Britain
19T	Ali Heidar Ali Mohamed	Kuwait
19T	Haldun Efemgil	Turkey
19T	Shigueto Yamasaki Júnior	Brazil
23T	Vlado Paradžik	Bosnia and Herzegovina
23T	Antoni Molne	Andorra
23T	Rui Ludovino	Portugal
23T	Carlos Sotillo	Spain
23T	Ahmed El-Sayed	Egypt
23T	Bosolo Mobando	Zaire
23T	Francisco de Souza	Angola
23T	Salah Al-Humaidi	Yemen
23T	Carlos Noriega	Bolivia
23T	Youssef Omar Isahak	Djibouti
23T	Petr Šedivák	Czechoslovakia
23T	Leyton Mafuta	Zambia
35T	Nonilobal Hien	Burkina Faso
35T	Lee Kan	Hong Kong
35T	Narinder Singh	India
35T	Gilberto García	Dominican Republic
35T	Luis Martínez	Puerto Rico
35T	Leonardo Salvucci	Argentina
35T	Tony Okada	United States
35T	Charbel Chrabie	Lebanon
35T	Jerry Dino	Philippines
