= Burkina Faso at the Olympics =

- IOC code: BUR
- NOC: Burkinabé National Olympic and Sports Committee
- Medals Ranked 151st: Gold 0 Silver 0 Bronze 1 Total 1

Summer appearances
- 1972; 1976–1984; 1988; 1992; 1996; 2000; 2004; 2008; 2012; 2016; 2020; 2024

Burkina Faso has sent athletes to every Summer Olympic Games held since 1988. Under its previous name of Upper Volta (VOL), the country also competed in 1972. After appearing in ten different Olympics, Burkina Faso won their first Olympic medal at the 2020 Summer Olympics, following Hugues Fabrice Zango's bronze-winning performance in the men's triple jump. No athletes from Burkina Faso have competed in any Winter Olympic Games.

== Medal tables ==
=== Medals by Summer Games ===
Games	Athletes	Gold	Silver	Bronze	Total	Rank
(West Germany) 1972 Munich	1	0	0	0	0	–
(Canada) 1976 Montreal	did not participate					
(Soviet Union) 1980 Moscow	did not participate					
(United States) 1984 Los Angeles	did not participate					
(South Korea) 1988 Seoul	6	0	0	0	0	–
(Spain) 1992 Barcelona	4	0	0	0	0	–
(United States) 1996 Atlanta	5	0	0	0	0	–
(Australia) 2000 Sydney	4	0	0	0	0	–
(Greece) 2004 Athens	5	0	0	0	0	–
(China) 2008 Beijing	6	0	0	0	0	–
(United Kingdom) 2012 London	5	0	0	0	0	–
(Brazil) 2016 Rio de Janeiro	5	0	0	0	0	–
(Japan) 2020 Tokyo	7	0	0	1	1	86
(France) 2024 Paris	8	0	0	0	0	–
(United States) 2028 Los Angeles	future event					
(Australia) 2032 Brisbane	future event					
Total		0	0	1	1	151

=== Medals by sport ===
Sport	Gold	Silver	Bronze	Total
Athletics	0	0	1	1
Totals (1 entries)	0	0	1	1

== List of medalists ==
Medal	Name	Games	Sport	Event
Bronze	Hugues Fabrice Zango	2020 Tokyo	Athletics	Men's triple jump

== Olympic Overview ==
=== 1972 Summer Olympics ===
The 1972 Olympics was the first and only time that the Republic of Upper Volta competed at the summer olympics. Only one athlete competed at the 1972 Games in Munich for the country, as André Bicaba competed in the 100m event where he placed 5th in his heat with a time of 10.71.

=== 1988 Summer Olympics ===
At the 1988 Olympic Games in Seoul, South Korea, Burkina Faso competed under its current name and flag for the first time. Six athletes, two boxers and four track athletes, competed for Burkina Faso at the games. Harouna Pale was the most successful athlete at the games, as the only Burkinabé to make it out of their heat in the 200m. All other athletes failed to advance beyond the heats.

These games also saw the first female Burkinabé athlete to compete at the Olympics. Mariama Ouiminga competed at both the 100m and 200m events, failing to qualify for the quarter final in either event.

=== 1992 Summer Olympics ===
Four athletes competed for Burkina Faso in 1992. These games saw the first Burkinabé judoka competing at the Olympics, as Nonilobal Hien competed in the extra lightweight competition, losing his opening match to Bosolo Mobando of Zaire. In athletics, Franck Zio and Harouna Pale failed to qualify for the semi finals of the long jump and 100 meters events respectively. Patrice Traoré Zeba did not finish his heat of the 100 meters.

=== 1996 Summer Olympics ===
Burkina Faso sent five athletes to the 1996 Olympic Games. All athletes were knocked out of their heats. Franck Zio became the first Burkinabé athlete to compete at two different Olympic Games. He bore the Burkinabé flag at the opening ceremony.

=== 2000 Summer Olympics ===
For the first time in 2000, Burkinabé athletes competed in three sports during one Olympic Games at the Sydney Olympics in 2000. Four athletes competed across these three sports, athletics, judo, and boxing. The flag was bore during the opening ceremony by Sarah Tondé who competed in the 100 meters, failing to advance from her heat. Boxer Drissa Tou was the only Burkinabé to advance beyond the first round at these Olympics, as he beat Iran's Mohammad Rahim Rahimi in the flyweight category. In the quarter finals he lost to eventual bronze medalist Jérôme Thomas of France.

=== 2004 Summer Olympics ===
Mamadou Ouedraogo was the first Burkinabé swimmer to compete at an Olympic Games in 2004, and he bore the flag at the Games' opening ceremony. He finished 81st out of 83 swimmers in the 50m freestyle event, failing to advance to the semi-finals.

=== 2008 Summer Olympics ===
The 2008 Olympic Team of Burkina Faso was the largest Burkinabé contingent of athletes at an Olympic Games since 1988, with both years six athletes competing, although this year for the first team these six athletes were spread across four sports. Burkina Faso made its debut in Olympic Fencing in 2008, as Julien Ouedraogo competed in the individual sabre competition, losing his Round of 64 match to Frenchman Nicolas Lopez. Hanatou Ouelogo, despite receiving a bye into the Round of 16 of the 48kg Judo competition, was eliminated in her first match by Kelbet Nurgazina of Kazakhstan.

The Burkinabé flag was held during the opening ceremony by Aïssata Soulama, who in the women's 400m hurdles finished 5th in her semi final, achieving a season best time of 55.17.

=== 2012 Summer Olympics ===
The 2012 Sumer Olympic Games in London saw five athletes compete in three sports from Burkina Faso. In 2011, Séverine Nébié won gold at the 2011 All-Africa Games in the 63kg Judo competition. Despite this she lost her round of 16 match against bronze medalist from the 2008 Games Elisabeth Willeboordse. Burkina Faso were allocated two "Universality places" from FINA, allowing Adama Ouedraogo and Angelika Ouedraogo to compete in the 50m freestyle competitions, where neither athlete advanced from the heats.

=== 2016 Summer Olympics ===
Four of Burkina Faso's five athletes at these games earned their ticket to Rio de Janeiro in 2016 through universality slots. Two athletes (one for each gender) competed in both athletics and swimming in these games. No Burkinabé athlete made it out of their heats, including judoka Rachid Sidibé who bore the nation's flag at the opening ceremony.

=== 2020 Summer Olympics ===
The 2020 Summer Olympics in Tokyo, Japan saw Hugues Fabrice Zango win Burkina Faso's first, and to date only, olympic medal in the triple jump. Fabrice Zango had competed in the 2016 Games in Rio de Janeiro after Burkina Faso received a universality place allowing him to participate in the games. Other notable athletes at these games included the first Burkinabé cyclist to compete in the Olympics, Paul Daumont, and Faysal Sawadogo who competed in the Taekwondo competition, losing both his first match to eventual gold medalist Maksim Khramtsov, and his repecharge match against Croatian Toni Kanaet.

=== 2024 Summer Olympics ===
Burkina Faso sent 5 athletes to the 2024 Games in Paris. Hugues Zango finished 5th in the triple jump.

== See also ==
- List of flag bearers for Burkina Faso at the Olympics
- Burkina Faso at the Paralympics
