= Judo at the 1996 Summer Olympics – Women's 72 kg =

Women's 72 kg at the Games of the XXVI Olympiad
- Venue: Georgia World Congress Center
- Date: 21 July 1996
- Competitors: 21 from 21 nations

Medalists
1st place, gold medalist(s)		Ulla Werbrouck	Belgium
2nd place, silver medalist(s)		Yoko Tanabe	Japan
3rd place, bronze medalist(s)		Ylenia Scapin	Italy
3rd place, bronze medalist(s)		Diadenis Luna	Cuba

These are the results of the Women's 72 kg (also known as Half-Heavyweight) competition in judo at the 1996 Summer Olympics in Atlanta, Georgia. A total of 20 women competed in this event, limited to jūdōka whose body weight was less than, or equal to, 72 kilograms. Competition took place in the Georgia World Congress Center.

== Main bracket ==
The gold and silver medalists were determined by the final match of the main single-elimination bracket.

Round of 32
Leng (CHN)	W
Chen (TPE)	L
Belyaeva (UKR)	W
St. Louis (MRI)	L
Bogunova (KAZ)	L
Curto (ESP)	W
Bacher (USA)	L
Ertel (GER)	W
Essombe (FRA)	W
Jenkins (CAN)	L

Round of 16
Scapin (ITA)	W
Leng (CHN)	L
Belyaeva (UKR)	W
Richter (ROU)	L
Galante (RUS)	L
Werbrouck (BEL)	W
Nazarenko (TKM)	L
Curto (ESP)	W
Howey (GBR)	W
Kienhuis (NED)	L
Ertel (GER)	L
Tanabe (JPN)	W
Luna (CUB)	L
Essombe (FRA)	W
Galea (AUS)	L
Gomez (VEN)	W

Quarterfinals
Scapin (ITA)	L
Belyaeva (UKR)	W
Werbrouck (BEL)	W
Curto (ESP)	L
Howey (GBR)	L
Tanabe (JPN)	W
Essombe (FRA)	W
Gomez (VEN)	L

Semifinals
Belyaeva (UKR)	L
Werbrouck (BEL)	W
Tanabe (JPN)	W
Essombe (FRA)	L

Gold medal final
Werbrouck (BEL)	W
Tanabe (JPN)	L

== Repechage ==
The losing semifinalists as well as those judoka eliminated in earlier rounds by the four semifinalists of the main bracket advanced to the repechage. These matches determined the two bronze medalists for the event.

First round
St Louis (MRI)	L
Richter (ROU)	W
Bye
Bye
Bye
Bye
Jenkins (CAN)	L
Luna (CUB)	W

Second round
Richter (ROU)	L
Scapin (ITA)	W
Galyant (RUS)	W
Curto (ESP)	L
Howey (GBR)	L
Ertel (GER)	W
Luna (CUB)	W
Gómez (VEN)	L

Third round
Scapin (ITA)	W
Galyant (RUS)	L
Ertel (GER)	L
Luna (CUB)	W

Bronze medal finals
Scapin (ITA)	W
Essombe (FRA)	L
Luna (CUB)	W
Belyaeva (UKR)	L
