= Burkina Faso at the 1992 Summer Olympics =

- IOC code: BUR
- NOC: Burkinabé National Olympic and Sports Committee

in Barcelona
- Competitors: 4 in 2 sports
- Medals: Gold 0 Silver 0 Bronze 0 Total 0

Summer Olympics appearances (overview)
- 1972; 1976–1984; 1988; 1992; 1996; 2000; 2004; 2008; 2012; 2016; 2020; 2024

Burkina Faso competed at the 1992 Summer Olympics in Barcelona, Spain.

== Competitors ==
The following is the list of number of competitors in the Games.

Sport	Men	Women	Total
Athletics	3	0	3
Judo	1	0	1
Total	4	0	4

== Athletics ==
Key

- Note–Ranks given for track events are within the athlete's heat only
- Q = Qualified for the next round
- q = Qualified for the next round as a fastest loser or, in field events, by position without achieving the qualifying target
- NR = National record
- N/A = Round not applicable for the event
- Bye = Athlete not required to compete in round

Men
Track & road events

Athlete	Event	Heat		Quarterfinal		Semifinal		Final	
Athlete	Event	Result	Rank	Result	Rank	Result	Rank	Result	Rank
Patrice Traoré	100 m	did not finish		did not advance					
Harouna Pale	200 m	21.65	6	did not advance					

Field

Athlete	Event	Qualification		Final	
Athlete	Event	Result	Rank	Result	Rank
Franck Zio	Long jump	7.70	24	did not advance	

== Judo ==
Athlete	Event	Round of 64	Round of 32	Round of 16	Quarterfinals	Semifinals	Final	
Athlete	Event	Opposition Result	Opposition Result	Opposition Result	Opposition Result	Opposition Result	Opposition Result	Rank
Nonilobal Hien	Extra lightweight	Mobando (COD); L	did not advance					

== See also ==
- Burkina Faso at the 1992 Summer Paralympics

== Sources ==
- Official Olympic Reports
