= Burkina Faso at the 2008 Summer Olympics =

- IOC code: BUR
- NOC: Burkinabé National Olympic and Sports Committee

in Beijing
- Competitors: 6 in 4 sports
- Flag bearer: Aïssata Soulama
- Medals: Gold 0 Silver 0 Bronze 0 Total 0

Summer Olympics appearances (overview)
- 1972; 1976–1984; 1988; 1992; 1996; 2000; 2004; 2008; 2012; 2016; 2020; 2024; 2028

Burkina Faso competed at the 2008 Summer Olympics in Beijing, China.

== Athletics ==
Men

Athlete	Event	Heat		Quarterfinal		Semifinal		Final	
Athlete	Event	Result	Rank	Result	Rank	Result	Rank	Result	Rank
Idrissa Sanou	100 m	10.63	6	did not advance					

Women

Athlete	Event	Heat		Semifinal		Final	
Athlete	Event	Result	Rank	Result	Rank	Result	Rank
Aïssata Soulama	400 m hurdles	56.37	5 q	55.69	5	did not advance	

Key

- Note–Ranks given for track events are within the athlete's heat only
- Q = Qualified for the next round
- q = Qualified for the next round as a fastest loser or, in field events, by position without achieving the qualifying target
- NR = National record
- N/A = Round not applicable for the event
- Bye = Athlete not required to compete in round

== Fencing ==
Men

Athlete	Event	Round of 64	Round of 32	Round of 16	Quarterfinal	Semifinal	Final / BM	
Athlete	Event	Opposition Score	Opposition Score	Opposition Score	Opposition Score	Opposition Score	Opposition Score	Rank
Julien Ouedraogo	Individual sabre	Lopez (FRA); L 6–15	did not advance					

== Judo ==
Athlete	Event	Round of 32	Round of 16	Quarterfinals	Semifinals	Repechage 1	Repechage 2	Repechage 3	Final / BM	
Athlete	Event	Opposition Result	Opposition Result	Opposition Result	Opposition Result	Opposition Result	Opposition Result	Opposition Result	Opposition Result	Rank
Hanatou Ouelogo	Women's −48 kg	Bye	Nurgazina (KAZ); L 0000–1001	did not advance						

== Swimming ==
Men

Athlete	Event	Heat		Semifinal		Final	
Athlete	Event	Time	Rank	Time	Rank	Time	Rank
Rene Jacob Yougbara	50 m freestyle	30.08	92	did not advance			

Women

Athlete	Event	Heat		Semifinal		Final	
Athlete	Event	Time	Rank	Time	Rank	Time	Rank
Elisabeth Nikiema	50 m freestyle	34.98	85	did not advance			
