= Judo at the 2008 Summer Olympics – Women's 48 kg =

Judo at the 2008 Summer Olympics – Women's 52 kg

Women's 48 kg at the Games of the XXIX Olympiad
- Venue: Beijing Science and Technology University Gymnasium
- Dates: 9 August 2008
- Winning score: 1100

Medalists
1st place, gold medalist(s)		Alina Dumitru	Romania
2nd place, silver medalist(s)		Yanet Bermoy	Cuba
3rd place, bronze medalist(s)		Paula Pareto	Argentina
3rd place, bronze medalist(s)		Ryoko Tani	Japan

The women's 48 kg judo competition at the 2008 Summer Olympics was held on August 9 at the Beijing Science and Technology University Gymnasium. Preliminary rounds started at 12:00 pm CST. Repechage finals, semifinals, bouts for bronze medals, and the final were held at 6:00 pm CST.

This event was the lightest of the women's judo weight classes, limiting competitors to a maximum of 48 kilograms of body mass. Like all other judo events, bouts lasted five minutes. If the bout was still tied at the end, it was extended for another five-minute, sudden-death period; if neither judoka scored during that period, the match is decided by the judges. The tournament bracket consisted of a single-elimination contest culminating in a gold medal match. There was also a repechage to determine the winners of the two bronze medals. Each judoka who had lost to a semifinalist competed in the repechage. The two judokas who lost in the semifinals faced the winner of the opposite half of the bracket's repechage in bronze medal bouts.

== Qualifying athletes ==
Mat	Athlete	Country
1	Wu Shugen	China
1	Ryoko Tani	Japan
1	Sayaka Matsumoto	United States
1	Paula Pareto	Argentina
1	Tiffany Day	Australia
1	Lyudmyla Lusnikova	Ukraine
1	Chahnez M'barki	Tunisia
1	Eva Csernoviczki	Hungary
1	Sarah Menezes	Brazil
1	Kim Young-ran	South Korea
1	Alina Alexandra Dumitru	Romania
2	Devi Khumujam Tomb	India
2	Ana Hormigo	Portugal
2	Pak Ok-song	North Korea
2	Hanatou Ouelgo	Burkina Faso
2	Frédérique Jossinet	France
2	Kelbet Nurgazina	Kazakhstan
2	Michaela Baschin	Germany
2	Meriem Moussa	Algeria
2	Sandrine Ilendou	Gabon
2	Lyudmila Bogdanova	Russia
2	Yanet Bermoy	Cuba
2	Glenda Miranda	Ecuador

== Tournament results ==
=== Final ===
Final
1	Alina Alexandra Dumitru (ROU)	1100
2	Yanet Bermoy (CUB)	0000

=== Mat 1 ===
First Round
Ryoko Tani (JPN)	0020
Sayaka Matsumoto (USA)	0000
Lyudmyla Lusnikova (UKR)	0221
Chahnez M'barki (TUN)	0000
Eva Csernoviczki (HUN)	1000
Sarah Menezes (BRA)	0000

Round of 16
Wu Shugen (CHN)	0000
Ryoko Tani (JPN)	0100
Paula Pareto (ARG)	1000
Tiffany Day (AUS)	0000
Lyudmyla Lusnikova (UKR)	0000
Kim Young-ran (KOR)	0100
Eva Csernoviczki (HUN)	0010
Alina Alexandra Dumitru (ROU)	0101

Quarterfinals
Ryoko Tani (JPN)	0001
Paula Pareto (ARG)	0000
Kim Young-ran (KOR)	0000
Alina Alexandra Dumitru (ROU)	1000

Semifinals
Ryoko Tani (JPN)	0010
Alina Alexandra Dumitru (ROU)	0100

=== Mat 2 ===
First Round
Devi Khumujam Tomb (IND)	0000
Ana Hormigo (POR)	1011
Frédérique Jossinet (FRA)	0000
Kelbet Nurgazina (KAZ)	1000
Meriem Moussa (ALG)	0011
Sandrine Ilendou (GAB)	0000
Yanet Bermoy (CUB)	1010
Glenda Miranda (ECU)	0000

Round of 16
Ana Hormigo (POR)	0000
Pak Ok-Song (PRK)	0100
Hanatou Ouelgo (BUR)	0000
Kelbet Nurgazina (KAZ)	1001
Michaela Baschin (GER)	0101
Meriem Moussa (ALG)	0000
Lyudmila Bogdanova (RUS)	0001
Yanet Bermoy (CUB)	0010

Quarterfinals
Pak Ok-Song (PRK)	0011
Kelbet Nurgazina (KAZ)	0001
Michaela Baschin (GER)	0000
Yanet Bermoy (CUB)	0001

Semifinals
Pak Ok-Song (PRK)	0000
Yanet Bermoy (CUB)	1021

=== Repechage ===
Those judoka eliminated in earlier rounds by the four semifinalists of the main bracket advanced to the repechage. These matches determined the two bronze medalists for the event.

First round
Sayaka Matsumoto (USA)	0000
Wu Shugen (CHN)	1000
Eva Csernoviczki (HUN)
bye
Ana Hormigo (POR)
bye
Lyudmila Bogdanova (RUS)	1000
Glenda Miranda (ECU)	0000

Second round
Wu Shugen (CHN)	0001
Paula Pareto (ARG)	0100
Kim Young-ran (KOR)	0000
Eva Csernoviczki (HUN)	0001
Ana Hormigo (POR)	0002
Kelbet Nurgazina (KAZ)	0001
Lyudmila Bogdanova (RUS)	0001
Michaela Baschin (GER)	0000

Third round
Paula Pareto (ARG)	0110
Eva Csernoviczki (HUN)	0001
Ana Hormigo (POR)	0001
Lyudmila Bogdanova (RUS)	0100

Bronze medal finals
Pak Ok-Song (PRK)	0001
Paula Pareto (ARG)	0100
Ryoko Tani (JPN)	1000
Lyudmila Bogdanova (RUS)	0000
