= Lyudmila Bogdanova =

Russian Olympic judoka

Personal information
- Full name: Lyudmila Yuryevna Bogdanova
- Born: 12 August 1983 (age 42) Chişinău, Moldavian SSR
- Occupation: Judoka
- Height: 1.60 m (5 ft 3 in)

Sport
- Country: Russia
- Sport: Judo
- Weight class: –48 kg, –52 kg

Achievements and titles
- Olympic Games: 5th (2008)
- World Champ.: 5th (2005)
- European Champ.: 5th (2008, 2010, 2011)
Medal record
Women's judo
Representing Russia
IJF Grand Prix
Gold medal – first place	2011 Baku	–48 kg
Silver medal – second place	2010 Abu Dhabi	–48 kg
European U23 Championships
Gold medal – first place	2003 Yerevan	–52 kg
Gold medal – first place	2005 Kyiv	–52 kg
Silver medal – second place	2004 Ljubljana	–52 kg

Profile at external databases
- IJF: 623
- JudoInside.com: 1820
- Updated on 2 January 2023

Lyudmila Yuryevna Bogdanova (Russian: Людмила Юрьевна Богданова; born 12 August 1983) is a Russian judoka, who played for the extra lightweight category. She is a multiple-time Russian judo champion, and a two-time gold medalist for the 52 kg division at the European Junior Judo Championships (2003 in Yerevan, Armenia and 2005 in Kyiv, Ukraine). She also achieved three top-five finishes in the women's 48 kg class at the European Judo Championships (2008 in Lisbon, Portugal, 2010 in Vienna, Austria, and 2011 in Istanbul, Turkey).

== Career ==
Bogdanova represented Russia at the 2008 Summer Olympics in Beijing, where she competed for the women's 48 kg class. She received a bye for the second preliminary round, before losing out by a yuko and a non-combativity (P29) to Cuba's Yanet Bermoy. Because her opponent advanced further into the final, Bogdanova offered another shot for the bronze medal by defeating Ecuador's Glenda Miranda, Germany's Michaela Baschin, and Portugal's Ana Hormigo in the repechage rounds. She progressed to the bronze medal match, but narrowly lost the medal to Japanese judoka and five-time Olympian Ryoko Tani, who successfully scored an ippon and an uchi mata (inner thigh throw), at two minutes and twenty-seven seconds.
