= Judo at the 1992 Summer Olympics – Women's 72 kg =

Judo at the Olympics

Women's 72 kg at the Games of the XXV Olympiad
- Venue: Palau Blaugrana
- Date: 28 July 1992
- Competitors: 22 from 22 nations

Medalists
1st place, gold medalist(s)		Kim Mi-jung	South Korea
2nd place, silver medalist(s)		Yoko Tanabe	Japan
3rd place, bronze medalist(s)		Irene de Kok	Netherlands
3rd place, bronze medalist(s)		Laetitia Meignan	France

The women's 72 kg competition in judo at the 1992 Summer Olympics in Barcelona was held on 28 July at the Palau Blaugrana. The gold medal was won by Kim Mi-jung of South Korea.

== Results ==
=== Main brackets ===
==== Pool A ====
Round of 32
Laetitia Meignan (FRA)	RA
Irene de Kok (NED)	YUS
Sandra Godinho (POR)	E
Ulla Werbrouck (BEL)	YUK
Katarina Håkansson (SWE)	IPO
Heli Syrjä (FIN)	E

Round of 16
Irene de Kok (NED)	IPO
Simona Richter (ROU)	RA
Ulla Werbrouck (BEL)	IPO
Asenaca Lesivakaruakitotoiya (FIJ)	E
Katarina Håkansson (SWE)	WAZ
Mélanie Engoang (GAB)	E
Cristina Curto (ESP)	RA
Yoko Tanabe (JPN)	IPO

Quarterfinal
Irene de Kok (NED)	KIK
Ulla Werbrouck (BEL)	RA
Katarina Håkansson (SWE)	RA
Yoko Tanabe (JPN)	IPO

Semifinal
Irene de Kok (NED)	RB
Yoko Tanabe (JPN)	YUK

==== Pool B ====
Round of 32
Niurka Moreno (CUB)	IPO
Yelena Besova (EUN)	E
Josie Horton (GBR)	YUS
Sandy Bacher (USA)	RB
Kim Mi-jung (KOR)	IPO
Pujawati Utama (INA)	RB

Round of 16
Niurka Moreno (CUB)	E
Regina Schüttenhelm (GER)	KOK
Josie Horton (GBR)	IPO
Soraia André (BRA)	RB
Kim Mi-jung (KOR)	IPO
Alison Webb (CAN)	RB
María Cangá (ECU)	E
Katarzyna Juszczak (POL)	IPO

Quarterfinal
Regina Schüttenhelm (GER)	RB
Josie Horton (GBR)	YUS
Kim Mi-jung (KOR)	WIP
Katarzyna Juszczak (POL)	RB

Semifinal
Josie Horton (GBR)	RB
Kim Mi-jung (KOR)	WIP

=== Repechages ===
==== Repechage A ====
Repechage round 1
Laetitia Meignan (FRA)	IPO
Simona Richter (ROU)	E

Repechage quarterfinal
Laetitia Meignan (FRA)	IPO
Ulla Werbrouck (BEL)	E
Cristina Curto (ESP)	E
Katarina Håkansson (SWE)	YUK

Repechage semifinal
Laetitia Meignan (FRA)	YUK
Katarina Håkansson (SWE)	E

Repechage final
Laetitia Meignan (FRA)	YUK (bronze)
Josie Horton (GBR)	E

==== Repechage B ====
Repechage round 1
Sandy Bacher (USA)	YUK
Soraia André (BRA)	E
Pujawati Utama (INA)	E
Alison Webb (CAN)	IPO

Repechage quarterfinal
Sandy Bacher (USA)	E
Regina Schüttenhelm (GER)	KOK
Alison Webb (CAN)	E
Katarzyna Juszczak (POL)	WAZ

Repechage semifinal
Regina Schüttenhelm (GER)	YUS
Katarzyna Juszczak (POL)	E

Repechage final
Regina Schüttenhelm (GER)	E
Irene de Kok (NED)	IPO (bronze)

=== Final ===
Final
Yoko Tanabe (JPN)	2nd place, silver medalist(s)
Kim Mi-jung (KOR)	YUS (gold)

== Final classification ==
Rank	Judoka	Nation
1st place, gold medalist(s)	Kim Mi-jung	South Korea
2nd place, silver medalist(s)	Yoko Tanabe	Japan
3rd place, bronze medalist(s)	Irene de Kok	Netherlands
3rd place, bronze medalist(s)	Laetitia Meignan	France
5T	Josie Horton	Great Britain
5T	Regina Schüttenhelm	Germany
7T	Katarina Håkansson	Sweden
7T	Katarzyna Juszczak	Poland
9T	Ulla Werbrouck	Belgium
9T	Cristina Curto	Spain
9T	Sandy Bacher	United States
9T	Alison Webb	Canada
13T	Simona Richter	Romania
13T	Soraia André	Brazil
13T	Pujawati Utama	Indonesia
16T	Asenaca Lesivakaruakitotoiya	Fiji
16T	Mélanie Engoang	Gabon
16T	Niurka Moreno	Cuba
16T	María Cangá	Ecuador
20T	Sandra Godinho	Portugal
20T	Heli Syrjä	Finland
20T	Yelena Besova	Unified Team
