= Tiffany Day =

Tiffany Day may refer to:

- Tiffany Day (judoka) (1990–2019), Australian judoka
- Tiffany Day (musician) (born 2000), American singer and songwriter
