= Essombe =

Essombe or Essombé is a surname. Notable people with the surname include:

- Estha Essombe (born 1963), French judoka
- Joseph Essombe (born 1988), Cameroonian wrestler
- Marcel Essombé (born 1988), Cameroonian footballer
