= Pak Ok-song =

North Korean judoka

Personal information
- Born: 16 October 1984 (age 41)
- Occupation: Judoka
- Height: 1.55 m (5 ft 1 in)
- Weight: 53 kg (117 lb)

Sport
- Country: North Korea
- Sport: Judo
- Weight class: ‍–‍48 kg

Achievements and titles
- Olympic Games: 5th (2008)
- World Champ.: 5th (2005)
- Asian Champ.: (silver) (2008)
Medal record
Women's judo
Representing North Korea
Asian Championships
Silver medal – second place	2008 Jeju	‍–‍48 kg
Bronze medal – third place	2007 Kuwait City	‍–‍48 kg
East Asian Games
Silver medal – second place	2009 Hong Kong	‍–‍48 kg
East Asian Championships
Bronze medal – third place	2006 Ulaanbaatar	‍–‍48 kg
Asian Junior Championships
Bronze medal – third place	2001 Ho Chi Minh City	‍–‍48 kg

Profile at external databases
- IJF: 4975
- JudoInside.com: 18534
- Updated on 11 February 2025

Pak Ok-song (also Pak Ok-seong, Korean: 박옥성; born 16 October 1984) is a North Korean judoka, who played for the extra-lightweight category. She won two medals, silver and bronze, for the 48 kg division at the Asian Championships (2007 in Kuwait City, Kuwait and 2008 in Jeju City, South Korea).

Pak represented North Korea at the 2008 Summer Olympics in Beijing, where she competed for the women's extra-lightweight class (48 kg). She defeated Portugal's Ana Hormigo and Kazakhstan's Kelbet Nurgazina in the preliminary rounds, before losing out the semi-final match, by an ippon (full point) and a yoko shiho gatame (side four quarter hold), to Cuba's Yanet Bermoy. Because Bermoy advanced further into the final match against Romania's Alina Dumitru, Pak automatically qualified for the bronze medal game, where she narrowly lost the medal to Argentina's Paula Pareto, who successfully scored a waza-ari (half-point) and a kuchiki taoshi (single leg takedown), at the end of the five-minute period.
