= Katarzyna Juszczak =

Olympic wrestler

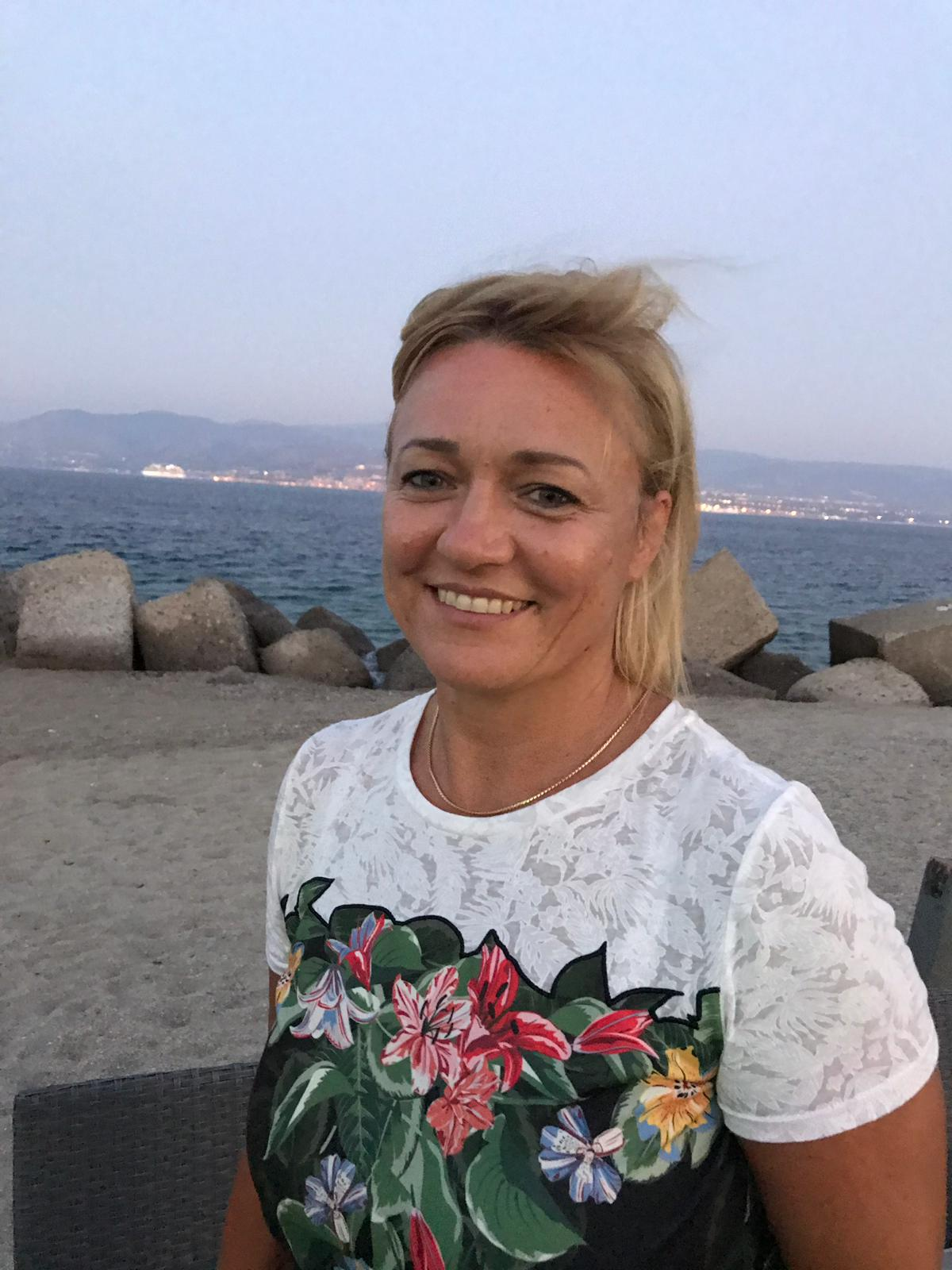

Personal information
- Full name: Katarzyna Schillaci
- Nationality: Poland; Italy
- Born: 4 March 1972 (age 54) Wrocław, Poland
- Height: 1.72 m (5 ft 7 1/2 in)
- Weight: 72 kg (159 lb)

Sport
- Style: Freestyle
- Club: AZS-AWF Wrocław (POL); Lotta Messina (ITA)
- Coach: Francesco Costa (ITA)

Katarzyna Schillaci (née Juszczak; born 4 March 1972 in Wrocław) is a retired amateur Polish-born Italian judoka and freestyle wrestler, who competed in the women's heavyweight category. She achieved top eight finishes in the 72-kg division at the World Championships (2002 and 2005), and also participated in two editions of the Olympic Games (1992 and 2004) under different banners.

She is the mother of the Italian judoka and paralympic Champion Carolina Costa.

== Biography ==
Starting her sporting career as a judoka for AZS-AWF Wrocław, Juszczak made her official debut at the 1992 Summer Olympics in Barcelona, where she competed in the women's 72 kg division. She ousted Ecuador's María Cangá in her opening match, before losing out to eventual Olympic champion Kim Mi-jung of South Korea by a powerful ippon within ten seconds.

Twelve years after her last Olympics, Juszczak qualified for her fresh Italian squad in the women's 72 kg class at the 2004 Summer Olympics in Athens. Earlier in the process, she finished second from the Olympic Qualification Tournament in Madrid, Spain to guarantee her place on the Italian wrestling team. She lost two straight matches each to eventual Olympic champion Wang Xu of China (0–5) and Canada's Christine Nordhagen (2–5), that left her on the bottom of the prelim pool, placing eleventh in the final standings.

== Personal life ==
When Juszczak emigrated to Italy in 1999, she turned her sights to women's wrestling, and later trained full-time for Messina Wrestling Club (Italian: Club Lotta Messina) under her personal coach Francesco Costa. In 2005, after the death of her husband, she remained to live and work in the sporting environment in the city of Messina, later she married the former Italian Olympic wrestler Giovanni Schillaci, and together they trained their daughter Carolina Costa, who in 2019 is qualified in the judo at the 2020 Summer Paralympics.

== Achievements ==
Year	Competition	Venue	Position	Event	Notes
Representing Poland
Judo
1992	Olympic Games	(Spain) Barcelona	7th	72 kg	
Representing Italy
Freestyle wrestling
2004	Olympic Games	(Greece) Athens	11th	72 kg	

== See also ==
- List of multi-sport athletes
- Dual sport and multi-sport Olympians
