= Burkina Faso at the 2016 Summer Olympics =

- IOC code: BUR
- NOC: Burkinabé National Olympic and Sports Committee

in Rio de Janeiro
- Competitors: 5 in 3 sports
- Flag bearer: Rachid Sidibé
- Medals: Gold 0 Silver 0 Bronze 0 Total 0

Summer Olympics appearances (overview)
- 1972; 1976–1984; 1988; 1992; 1996; 2000; 2004; 2008; 2012; 2016; 2020; 2024

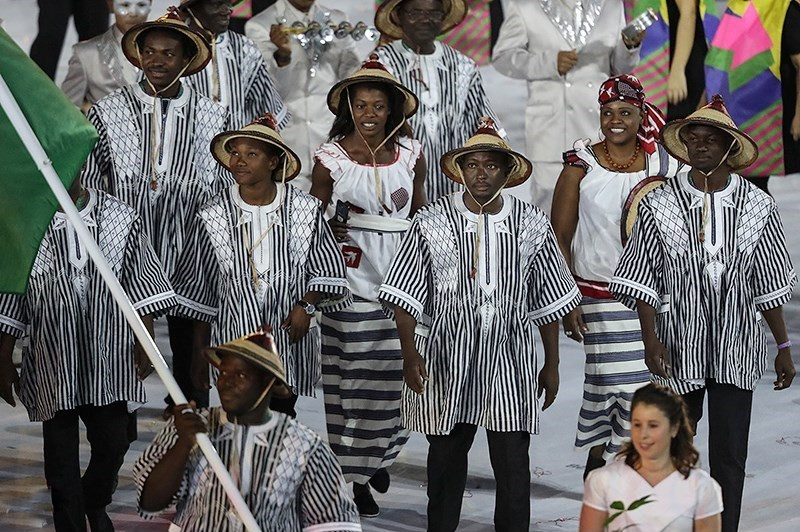
Burkina Faso at the 2016 Summer Olympics opening ceremony.

Burkina Faso competed at the 2016 Summer Olympics in Rio de Janeiro, Brazil, from 5 to 21 August 2016. This was the nation's ninth appearance at the Summer Olympics, having participated since the 1972 Summer Olympics in Munich under the name Upper Volta.

Five Burkinabe athletes, three men and two women, were selected to the team, tying the record for the nation's roster size with London 2012. Two of them returned for their second Olympic appearance from the previous Games: hurdler Marthe Koala and freestyle swimmer Angelika Ouedraogo. Meanwhile, heavyweight judoka Rachid Sidibé led the team as Burkina Faso's flag bearer in the opening ceremony.

Burkina Faso, however, had to wait for five more years until winning its first Olympic medal.

== Athletics ==
Burkina Faso received universality slots from IAAF to send two athletes (one male and one female) to the Olympics.

Key

- Note–Ranks given for track events are within the athlete's heat only
- Q = Qualified for the next round
- q = Qualified for the next round as a fastest loser or, in field events, by position without achieving the qualifying target
- NR = National record
- N/A = Round not applicable for the event
- Bye = Athlete not required to compete in round

Track & road events

Athlete	Event	Heat		Semifinal		Final	
Athlete	Event	Result	Rank	Result	Rank	Result	Rank
Marthe Koala	Women's 100 m hurdles	13.41	8	did not advance			

Field events

Athlete	Event	Qualification		Final	
Athlete	Event	Distance	Position	Distance	Position
Hugues Fabrice Zango	Men's triple jump	15.99	34	did not advance	

== Judo ==
Burkina Faso qualified one judoka for the men's heavyweight category (+100 kg) at the Games. Rachid Sidibe earned a continental quota spot from the African region as Burkina Faso's top-ranked judoka outside of direct qualifying position in the IJF World Ranking List of May 30, 2016.

Athlete	Event	Round of 32	Round of 16	Quarterfinals	Semifinals	Repechage	Final / BM	
Athlete	Event	Opposition Result	Opposition Result	Opposition Result	Opposition Result	Opposition Result	Opposition Result	Rank
Rachid Sidibé	Men's +100 kg	Khammo (UKR); L 000–100	did not advance					

== Swimming ==
Burkina Faso received a Universality invitation from FINA to send two swimmers (one male and one female) to the Olympics.

Athlete	Event	Heat		Semifinal		Final	
Athlete	Event	Time	Rank	Time	Rank	Time	Rank
Tindwende Sawadogo	Men's 50 m freestyle	26.38	67	did not advance			
Angelika Ouedraogo	Women's 50 m freestyle	29.44	=67	did not advance			
