= Carlos Noriega =

Carlos Noriega may refer to:

- Carlos I. Noriega (born 1959), NASA astronaut, first Peruvian in space
- Carlos Noriega Hope (1896–1934), Mexican writer and journalist
- Carlos Noriega Romero (born 1952), Mexican politician, served in the LXV Legislature of the Mexican Congress
- Carlos Noriega (judoka) (born 1972), Bolivian judoka
- Carlos Noriega (swimmer) (1922–1991), Uruguayan swimmer
