= Ana Hormigo =

Portuguese judoka

Personal information
- Full name: Ana Cristina Teles Meneses; Hormigo
- Nationality: Portugal
- Born: 13 April 1981 (age 45) Castelo Branco, Portugal
- Occupation: Judoka
- Height: 1.55 m (5 ft 1 in)

Sport
- Country: Portugal
- Sport: Judo
- Weight class: –48 kg
- Club: Associação Judo Clube União; Albicastrense
- Coached by: Abel Louro

Achievements and titles
- Olympic Games: 7th (2008)
- World Champ.: 9th (2003, 2005)
- European Champ.: (bronze) (2008)
Medal record
Women's judo
Representing Portugal
European Championships
Bronze medal – third place	2008 Lisbon	–48 kg

Profile at external databases
- IJF: 4396
- JudoInside.com: 11355
- Updated on 16 November 2022

Ana Cristina Teles Meneses Hormigo (born 13 April 1981) is a Portuguese judoka, who played for the extra-lightweight category. She won a bronze medal for her division at the 2008 European Judo Championships, and eventually defeated Italy's Valentina Moscatt for the gold at the 2011 IJF World Cup in Lisbon. Hormigo is also a member of Associação Judo Clube União Albicastrense, and is coached and trained by Abel Louro.

Hormigo represented Portugal at the 2008 Summer Olympics in Beijing, where she competed for the women's extra-lightweight class (48 kg). She defeated India's Devi Khumujam Tomb in the first preliminary round, before losing out her next match by a waza-ari (half-point), and an ōuchi gari (big inner reap) to North Korea's Pak Ok-Song. Because her opponent advanced further into the semi-finals, Hormigo offered another shot for the bronze medal by defeating Kazakhstan's Kelbet Nurgazina, with two koka, and a sankaku gatame (arm crush triangular arm lock), in the repechage rounds. Unfortunately, she finished only in seventh place, after losing out the final repechage bout to Russia's Lyudmila Bogdanova, who successfully scored a waza-ari and a tomoe nage (circle throw), at the end of the five-minute period.
