= Yoon Hyun =

South Korean judoka

Personal information
- Born: 5 April 1966 (age 60)
- Occupation: Judoka

Korean name
- Hangul: 윤현
- Hanja: 尹鉉
- RR: Yun Hyeon
- MR: Yun Hyŏn

Sport
- Country: South Korea
- Sport: Judo
- Weight class: ‍–‍60 kg

Achievements and titles
- Olympic Games: (silver) (1992)
- World Champ.: (silver) (1991)
- Asian Champ.: (gold) (1991)
Medal record
Men's judo
Representing South Korea
Olympic Games
Silver medal – second place	1992 Barcelona	‍–‍60 kg
World Championships
Silver medal – second place	1991 Barcelona	‍–‍60 kg
Bronze medal – third place	1989 Belgrade	‍–‍60 kg
Asian Championships
Gold medal – first place	1991 Osaka	‍–‍60 kg

Profile at external databases
- IJF: 10277
- JudoInside.com: 3749
- Updated on 5 June 2023

Yoon Hyun (born 5 April 1966) is a South Korean judoka.

Yoon won a silver medal in the extra lightweight division (‍–‍60 kg), losing to Nazim Huseynov from Azerbaijan in the final in the 1992 Summer Olympics. Yoon also won two World Championships medals in 1989 and 1991.
