= Burkina Faso at the 1996 Summer Olympics =

- IOC code: BUR
- NOC: Burkinabé National Olympic and Sports Committee

in Atlanta
- Competitors: 5 in 2 sports
- Flag bearer: Franck Zio
- Medals: Gold 0 Silver 0 Bronze 0 Total 0

Summer Olympics appearances (overview)
- 1972; 1976–1984; 1988; 1992; 1996; 2000; 2004; 2008; 2012; 2016; 2020; 2024

Burkina Faso competed at the 1996 Summer Olympics in Atlanta, Georgia, United States.

== Competitors ==
The following is the list of number of competitors in the Games.

Sport	Men	Women	Total
Athletics	2	2	4
Boxing	1	–	1
Total	3	2	5

== Results by event ==
=== Athletics ===
==== Men ====
Field events

Athlete	Event	Qualification		Final	
Athlete	Event	Result	Rank	Result	Rank
Olivier Sanou	High jump	No mark		Did not advance	
Franck Zio	Long jump	No mark		Did not advance	

==== Women ====
Field events

Athlete	Event	Qualification		Final	
Athlete	Event	Result	Rank	Result	Rank
Irène Tiendrébéogo	High jump	1.80	=29	Did not advance	
Chantal Ouoba	Triple jump	12.40	27	Did not advance	

=== Boxing ===
Athlete	Event	Round of 32	Round of 16	Quarterfinal	Semifinal	Final
Athlete	Event	Opposition Result	Opposition Result	Opposition Result	Opposition Result	Opposition Result
Idrissa Kabore	Lightweight	Konečný (CZE); L 16-6	Did not advance			
