= 2003 World Wrestling Championships – Women's freestyle 72 kg =

Women's freestyle 72 kg at the 2003 World Championships
- Venue: Madison Square Garden
- Dates: 12–14 September 2003
- Competitors: 23 from 23 nations

Medalists
gold medal	Kyoko Hamaguchi	Japan
silver medal	Toccara Montgomery	United States
bronze medal	Wang Xu	China

The women's freestyle 72 kilograms is a competition featured at the 2003 World Wrestling Championships, and was held at the Madison Square Garden in New York, United States from 12 to 14 September 2003.

== Results ==
Legend

- F — Won by fall

=== Preliminary round ===
==== Pool 1 ====
Pos	Athlete	Pld	W	L	CP	TP	AUT	ITA	GRE
1	Marina Gastl (AUT)	2	2	0	7	14	—	11–0	3–1
2	Katarzyna Juszczak (ITA)	2	1	1	3	3	0–4 ST	—	3–0
3	Aikaterini Siavou (GRE)	2	0	2	1	1	1–3 PP	0–3 PO	—

Source: Official website

==== Pool 2 ====
Pos	Athlete	Pld	W	L	CP	TP	USA	TUR	SEN
1	Toccara Montgomery (USA)	2	2	0	7	14	—	7–0	7–0 Fall
2	Zarife Yıldırım (TUR)	2	1	1	4	4	0–3 PO	—	4–0 Fall
3	Marie Nicole Diédhiou (SEN)	2	0	2	0	0	0–4 TO	0–4 TO	—

Source: Official website

==== Pool 3 ====
Pos	Athlete	Pld	W	L	CP	TP	GER	VEN	CZE
1	Anita Schätzle (GER)	2	2	0	7	13	—	4–0 Fall	9–3
2	Yasmily Ramos (VEN)	2	1	1	3	3	0–4 TO	—	3–2
3	Kateřina Halová (CZE)	2	0	2	2	5	1–3 PP	1–3 PP	—

Source: Official website

==== Pool 4 ====
Pos	Athlete	Pld	W	L	CP	TP	CHN	CAN	BRA
1	Wang Xu (CHN)	2	2	0	7	15	—	5–1	10–0
2	Ohenewa Akuffo (CAN)	2	1	1	4	8	1–3 PP	—	7–0
3	Aline Ferreira (BRA)	2	0	2	0	0	0–4 ST	0–3 PO	—

Source: Official website

==== Pool 5 ====
Pos	Athlete	Pld	W	L	CP	TP	JPN	UKR	IND
1	Kyoko Hamaguchi (JPN)	2	2	0	7	12	—	3–0	9–1 Fall
2	Svetlana Saenko (UKR)	2	1	1	4	10	0–3 PO	—	10–0
3	Sonika Kaliraman (IND)	2	0	2	0	1	0–4 TO	0–4 ST	—

Source: Official website

==== Pool 6 ====
Pos	Athlete	Pld	W	L	CP	TP	POL	RUS	KOR	AUS
1	Edyta Witkowska (POL)	3	3	0	11	19	—	5–1 Fall	3–0	11–0 Fall
2	Guzel Manyurova (RUS)	3	2	1	7	20	0–4 TO	—	11–9	8–0 Fall
3	Kang Min-jeong (KOR)	3	1	2	5	18	0–3 PO	1–3 PP	—	9–0 Fall
4	Phillipa Katonivualiku (AUS)	3	0	3	0	0	0–4 TO	0–4 TO	0–4 TO	—

Source: Official website

==== Pool 7 ====
Pos	Athlete	Pld	W	L	CP	TP	BUL	KAZ	FRA	KGZ
1	Stanka Zlateva (BUL)	3	3	0	12	13	—	11–1 Fall	2–0 Fall	WO
2	Svetlana Yaroshevich (KAZ)	3	2	1	8	19	0–4 TO	—	12–0	6–0 Fall
3	Fanny Gai (FRA)	3	1	2	3	6	0–4 TO	0–4 ST	—	6–5
4	Yana Panova (KGZ)	3	0	3	1	5	0–4 PA	0–4 TO	1–3 PP	—

Source: Official website

=== Knockout round ===
Quarterfinals
Marina Gastl (AUT)	0
Toccara Montgomery (USA)	8^{F}
Anita Schätzle (GER)	1
Wang Xu (CHN)	5
Kyoko Hamaguchi (JPN)	4
Edyta Witkowska (POL)	0

Semifinals
Toccara Montgomery (USA)	7^{F}
Wang Xu (CHN)	1
Kyoko Hamaguchi (JPN)	4
Stanka Zlateva (BUL)	2

Final
Toccara Montgomery (USA)	1
Kyoko Hamaguchi (JPN)	4
Bronze medal match
Wang Xu (CHN)	6^{F}
Stanka Zlateva (BUL)	1
