= Richard Trautmann =

German judoka (born 1969)

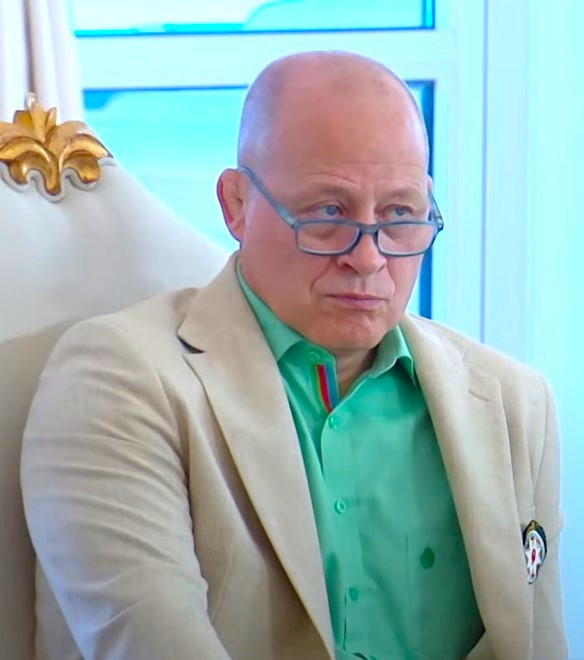

Personal information
- Born: 7 February 1969 (age 57) Munich, Bavaria
- Occupation: Judoka
- Height: 168 cm (5 ft 6 in)

Sport
- Country: Germany
- Sport: Judo
- Weight class: ‍–‍60 kg
- Rank: 6th dan black belt

Achievements and titles
- Olympic Games: (bronze) (1992, 1996)
- World Champ.: (bronze) (1993)
- European Champ.: 5th (1990, 1993)
Medal record
Men's judo
Representing Germany
Olympic Games
Bronze medal – third place	1992 Barcelona	‍–‍60 kg
Bronze medal – third place	1996 Atlanta	‍–‍60 kg
World Championships
Bronze medal – third place	1993 Hamilton	‍–‍60 kg
European Junior Championships
Bronze medal – third place	1988 Vienna	‍–‍60 kg
Bronze medal – third place	1989 Athens	‍–‍60 kg

Profile at external databases
- IJF: 1280
- JudoInside.com: 2225
- Updated on 4 June 2023

Richard Trautmann (born 7 February 1969 in Munich, Bavaria) is a German judoka. He won two Olympic bronze medals in the extra-lightweight (–60 kg) division, in 1992 and 1996.
