= Sounaila Sagnon =

Burkinabe boxer (born 1966)

Personal information
- Born: 4 June 1966 (age 60)

Sport
- Sport: Boxing

Sounaila Sagnon (born 4 June 1966) is a Burkinabé boxer who competed at the 1988 Summer Olympics.

Sagnon entered the light-middleweight event at the 1988 Summer Olympics and received a bye in the first round, in the second round bout he beat Ugandan boxer John Bosco Waigo when the referee stopped the fight after 1 minute 51 seconds of the first round, his next fight was against Soviet Union boxer Yevgeni Zaytsev, the Russian was too strong for Sagnon and the fight was stopped in the second round.

Olympic Games
Preceded by First	Flagbearer for Burkina Faso; 1988 Seoul	Succeeded by Franck Zio
