= Chen Cailiang =

Chinese judoka

Personal information
- Nationality: Chinese
- Born: 9 February 1970 (age 55)

Sport
- Sport: Judo

Chen Cailiang (born 9 February 1970) is a Chinese judoka. He competed in the men's extra-lightweight event at the 1992 Summer Olympics.
