= Yevgeniya Bogunova =

Kazakh judoka

Personal information
- Nationality: Kazakhstani
- Born: 29 September 1974 (age 51)

Sport
- Sport: Judo

Yevgeniya Bogunova (Евгения Владимировна Богунова, born 29 September 1974) is a Kazakhstani judoka. She competed in the women's half-heavyweight event at the 1996 Summer Olympics.
