= Leyton Mafuta =

Zambian judoka

Personal information
- Nationality: Zambian
- Born: 31 March 1970 (age 54)

Sport
- Sport: Judo

Leyton Mafuta (born 31 March 1970) is a Zambian judoka. He competed in the men's extra-lightweight event at the 1992 Summer Olympics.
