= Pujawati Utama =

Indonesian judoka (1960–2012)

Personal information
- Nationality: Indonesian
- Born: 4 June 1960
- Died: 2 January 2012 (aged 51)

Sport
- Sport: Judo
Medal record
Representing Indonesia
Women's Judo
Asian Games
Bronze medal – third place	1990 Beijing	Women's –72 kg

Pujawati Utama (4 June 1960 – 2 January 2012) was an Indonesian judoka. She competed in the women's half-heavyweight event at the 1992 Summer Olympics.
