= Leonardo Salvucci =

Argentine judoka

Personal information
- Nationality: Argentine
- Born: 5 June 1971 (age 53)

Sport
- Sport: Judo

Leonardo Salvucci (born 5 June 1971) is an Argentine judoka. He competed in the men's extra-lightweight event at the 1992 Summer Olympics.
