= André Bicaba =

Burkinabé sprinter

Personal information
- Full name: André Bicaba
- Nationality: Burkinabé
- Born: 12 January 1945 (age 81) Upper Volta
- Height: 170 cm (5.6 ft)
- Weight: 67 kg (148 lb)

André Bicaba (born 12 January 1945) is a former Burkinabé sprinter. Born in then-Upper Volta, he worked as a physical education teacher and resided in Bobo-Dioulasso. Through a government program, he began training a year before the 1972 Summer Olympics.

Bicaba was given an athletics scholarship by West Germany to fund his trip to the Games and to train in Munich. He then competed in the heats of the men's 100 metres, not advancing further. He would be the first Burkinabé Olympian, and the only one to compete for Upper Volta.

== Biography ==
André Bicaba was born on 12 January 1945 in Upper Volta. He is a member of the Bwaba tribe. Bicaba lived in Bobo-Dioulasso and worked as a physical education teacher. Before that, he had studied in France in 1867. Though a new government initiative that emphasized physical fitness and improving the country's athletic facilities, he began his athletic training a year before the 1972 Summer Olympics.

After being a scholarship by West Germany, they had funded his trip to the 1972 Summer Olympics and also allowed him a month to train in and adapt to the climate of Munich. At the 1972 Summer Games, alongside fellow sprinter Jean-Paul Koama, they were part of the delegation of Upper Volta at the 1972 Summer Olympics. This edition of the games would be the first games that Upper Volta has sent a delegation for. Before the games, he had a personal best of 10.2 seconds in the 100 metres. During an interview, he stated that he was not expecting a medal though remained positive as it was still possible.

At the 1972 Summer Games, Koama did not compete in his event. Bicaba competed in the heats of the men's 100 metres on 31 September against six other athletes. He ran in a time of 10.71 seconds, placing him fifth in the heat and did not advance further. He would be the first Burkinabé Olympian.
