= Laetitia Meignan =

French judoka (born 1960)

Personal information
- Born: 25 June 1960 (age 66)
- Occupation: Judoka

Sport
- Country: France
- Sport: Judo
- Weight class: ‍–‍72 kg, Open

Achievements and titles
- Olympic Games: (bronze) (1992)
- World Champ.: (bronze) (1986, 1991)
- European Champ.: (gold) (1991, 1992, 1993)
Medal record
Women's judo
Representing France
Olympic Games
Bronze medal – third place	1992 Barcelona	‍–‍72 kg
World Championships
Bronze medal – third place	1986 women Maastricht	Open
Bronze medal – third place	1991 Barcelona	‍–‍72 kg
European Championships
Gold medal – first place	1991 Prague	‍–‍72 kg
Gold medal – first place	1992 Paris	‍–‍72 kg
Gold medal – first place	1993 Athens	‍–‍72 kg
Bronze medal – third place	1986 London	‍–‍72 kg
Bronze medal – third place	1987 Paris	Open
Bronze medal – third place	1988 Pamplona	‍–‍72 kg
Bronze medal – third place	1990 Frankfurt	‍–‍72 kg

Profile at external databases
- IJF: 53882
- JudoInside.com: 2556
- Updated on 5 June 2023

Laetitia Meignan (born 25 June 1960 in Paris) is a retired judoka from France, who represented her native country at the 1992 Summer Olympics in Barcelona, Spain, where she won a bronze medal in the women's half-heavyweight division (‍–‍72 kg), alongside Irene de Kok from the Netherlands.
