= Orlin Rusev =

Bulgarian judoka

Orlin Rusev (Bulgarian: Орлин Русев) (born 3 August 1972) is a Bulgarian judoka. He competed in the men's extra-lightweight event at the 1992 Summer Olympics.

== Achievements ==
Year	Tournament	Place	Weight class
1995	European Judo Championships	7th	Extra lightweight (60 kg)
