= Dashgombyn Battulga =

Mongolian judoka (born 1966)

Personal information
- Nationality: Mongolia
- Born: 4 March 1966 (age 60)

Sport
- Sport: Judo, sambo
Medal record
Representing Mongolia
Men's Judo
World Championships
Bronze medal – third place	1989 Belgrade	-60 kg
Asian Games
Bronze medal – third place	1990 Beijing	-60 kg
Bronze medal – third place	1994 Hiroshima	-65 kg
Asian Championships
Bronze medal – third place	1991 Osaka	–65 kg
Men's Sambo
World Championships
Bronze medal – third place	1988 Montreal	-62 kg
World Cup
Silver medal – second place	1989 Ulaanbaatar	-62 kg

Dashgombyn Battulga (born 4 March 1966) is a Mongolian judoka and sambist. He competed in the men's extra-lightweight event at the 1992 Summer Olympics. He won silver at the 1989 Sambo World Cup, along with bronze at the 1988 World Sambo Championships and 1989 World Judo Championships.
