= Niurka Moreno =

Cuban judoka (born 1972)

Personal information
- Nationality: Cuban
- Born: 12 October 1972 (age 53)

Sport
- Sport: Judo
Medal record
Representing Cuba
Pan American Games
Gold medal – first place	1991 Havana	Half-heavyweight
Central American and Caribbean Games
Gold medal – first place	1990 Mexico City	Half-heavyweight

Niurka Moreno Gutiérrez (born 12 October 1972) is a Cuban judoka. She competed in the women's half-heavyweight event at the 1992 Summer Olympics.
