= Burkina Faso at the 2012 Summer Olympics =

- IOC code: BUR
- NOC: Burkinabé National Olympic and Sports Committee

in London
- Competitors: 5 in 3 sports
- Flag bearers: Severine Nebie (opening); Angelika Ouedraogo (closing)
- Medals: Gold 0 Silver 0 Bronze 0 Total 0

Summer Olympics appearances (overview)
- 1972; 1976–1984; 1988; 1992; 1996; 2000; 2004; 2008; 2012; 2016; 2020; 2024

Burkina Faso competed at the 2012 Summer Olympics in London, United Kingdom, from 27 July to 12 August 2012. This was the nation's eighth appearance at the Olympics, having participated since the 1972 Summer Olympics in Munich under the name "Upper Volta". Five athletes from Burkina Faso were selected to the team, 3 women and 2 men, competing only in athletics, judo, and swimming. Burkina Faso, however, has yet to win its first Olympic medal.

== Athletics ==
Men

Athlete	Event	Heat		Quarterfinal		Semifinal		Final	
Athlete	Event	Result	Rank	Result	Rank	Result	Rank	Result	Rank
Gerard Kobeane	100 m	10.42	1 Q	10.48	6	did not advance			

Women

Athlete	Event	Heat		Semifinal		Final	
Athlete	Event	Result	Rank	Result	Rank	Result	Rank
Marthe Koala	100 m hurdles	13.91	7	did not advance			

Key

- Note–Ranks given for track events are within the athlete's heat only
- Q = Qualified for the next round
- q = Qualified for the next round as a fastest loser or, in field events, by position without achieving the qualifying target
- NR = National record
- N/A = Round not applicable for the event
- Bye = Athlete not required to compete in round

== Judo ==
Athlete	Event	Round of 32	Round of 16	Quarterfinals	Semifinals	Repechage	Final / BM	
Athlete	Event	Opposition Result	Opposition Result	Opposition Result	Opposition Result	Opposition Result	Opposition Result	Rank
Severine Nebie	Women's −63 kg	Bye	Willeboordse (NED); L 0001–1000	did not advance				

== Swimming ==
Burkina Faso has gained two "Universality places" from the FINA.

Men

Athlete	Event	Heat		Semifinal		Final	
Athlete	Event	Time	Rank	Time	Rank	Time	Rank
Adama Ouedraogo	50 m freestyle	25.26	41	did not advance			

Women

Athlete	Event	Heat		Semifinal		Final	
Athlete	Event	Time	Rank	Time	Rank	Time	Rank
Angelika Ouedraogo	50 m freestyle	32.19	62	did not advance			
