= Vlado Paradžik =

Bosnian judoka (born 1967)

Personal information
- Nationality: Bosnian
- Born: 21 February 1967 (age 59) Vogošća, Yugoslavia

Sport
- Sport: Judo

Vlado Paradžik (born 21 February 1967) is a Bosnian judoka. He competed in the men's extra-lightweight event at the 1992 Summer Olympics.

== Biography ==
Paradžik was born on 21 February 1967 in Vogošća, Yugoslavia. He began practicing judo in 1974 and competed in Yugoslavia and then Bosnia and Herzegovina. He was a bronze medalist at the cadet national championships in 1982, a silver medalist at the junior national championships in 1987, and a bronze medalist at the senior national championships in 1989. When the Bosnian War started in 1992, the 25-year-old Paradžik was part of the front-line defense for the city of Sarajevo and served in a police paramilitary unit.

At the same time, Paradžik continued training in judo, being selected to represent Bosnia and Herzegovina for the 1992 Summer Olympics in Barcelona, the country's first participation at the games. Due to the war, every gymnasium in the region was destroyed, and thus he trained for the Olympics in a basement on mattresses, having only one training partner. A few weeks before the Olympics, he was given leave from his paramilitary unit to train full-time. Amid the war, there was a scarcity of food, and thus in trying to "bulk up" for the games, he lost 11 pounds (5.0 kg). With the Olympics approaching, Paradžik remained in Sarajevo and it was uncertain whether he would be able to make it to the games, held in Barcelona, Spain. Shortly before the Olympics were to take place, he and the other Bosnian Olympic selections were escorted by the United Nations Protection Force to an airport, where a special plane chartered by the International Olympic Committee waited. After arriving at the airport, the plane was stuck as grenades were exploding nearby the runway. After a six-hour delay, the plane took off and arrived in Barcelona three hours before the opening Olympic ceremony. At the Olympics, Paradžik competed in the men's extra-lightweight event, being defeated in his first fight and finishing tied for 23rd, equal with 11 other competitors.

After the Olympics, Paradžik moved to Sweden due to the war. He continued being active in judo, serving as the head coach and later chairman of the Södertälje Judo Club. By 2018, he was living in the Swedish town of Södertälje with his wife, three daughters and son.
