= Francisco de Souza =

Angolan judoka

Personal information
- Nationality: Angolan
- Born: 30 November 1965 (age 59)

Sport
- Sport: Judo

Francisco de Souza (born 30 November 1965) is an Angolan judoka. He competed in the men's extra-lightweight event at the 1992 Summer Olympics.
