= Athletics at the 1993 Summer Universiade – Men's long jump =

The men's long jump event at the 1993 Summer Universiade was held at the UB Stadium in Buffalo, United States on 17 and 18 July 1993.

== Medalists ==
Gold	Silver	Bronze
Kareem Streete-Thompson; United States	Obinna Eregbu; Nigeria	Vitaliy Kyrylenko; Ukraine

== Results ==
=== Qualification ===
Rank	Group	Athlete	Nationality	Result	Notes
1	?	Kareem Streete-Thompson	United States	8.07	
2	?	Obinna Eregbu	Nigeria	8.04	
3	?	Vitaliy Kyrylenko	Ukraine	7.98	
4	?	Masaki Morinaga	Japan	7.84	
5	?	Bogdan Tudor	Romania	7.82	
6	?	Aleksandr Glavatskiy	Belarus	7.77	
6	?	Franck Zio	Burkina Faso	7.77	
8	?	Otto Kärki	Finland	7.71	
9	?	Roman Orlík	Czech Republic	7.69	
10	?	Erik Nijs	Belgium	7.68	
11	?	Thorsten Heide	Germany	7.65	
12	?	Yassin Guellet	Belgium	7.57	
12	?	Franck Lestage	France	7.57w	
14	?	Tetsuya Shida	Japan	7.52	
14	?	Joël Plagnol	France	7.52w	
14	?	Jesús Oliván	Spain	7.52	
14	?	Jonathon Moyle	New Zealand	7.52	
18	?	John Oseisakhoa	Nigeria	7.50	
19	?	Siniša Ergotić	Croatia	7.49	
20	?	Simone Bianchi	Italy	7.43	
21	?	Andris Strīķis	Latvia	7.37	
22	?	Pål Saether	Norway	7.24	
23	?	Rod Mapstone	Australia	7.16	
24	?	Miguel Ángel Padrón	Venezuela	7.08	
25	?	Cristiano Laurino	Brazil	7.05	
26	?	Sergio Saavedra	Venezuela	7.04	
27	?	Osman Cline-Thomas	Sierra Leone	6.95	
28	?	Ndabazinhle Mdhlongwa	Zimbabwe	6.78	
29	?	Nazim Israyilov	Azerbaijan	6.75	
30	?	Mauricio Carranza	El Salvador	6.64	
31	?	Feston Bulaya	Zambia	5.94	
32	?	Clint Harvey	Australia	4.71	

=== Final ===
Rank	Athlete	Nationality	Result	Notes
1st place, gold medalist(s)	Kareem Streete-Thompson	United States	8.22 (w)	
2nd place, silver medalist(s)	Obinna Eregbu	Nigeria	8.18	
3rd place, bronze medalist(s)	Vitaliy Kyrylenko	Ukraine	8.04	
4	Bogdan Tudor	Romania	7.93	
5	Masaki Morinaga	Japan	7.86	
6	Franck Zio	Burkina Faso	7.74	
7	Roman Orlík	Czech Republic	7.73	
8	Franck Lestage	France	7.65	
9	Thorsten Heide	Germany	7.61	
10	Erik Nijs	Belgium	7.51	
11	Yassin Guellet	Belgium	7.29	
12	Otto Kärki	Finland	7.14	
	Aleksandr Glavatskiy	Belarus	NM	
