= Upper Volta at the 1972 Summer Olympics =

- IOC code: VOL
- NOC: Upper Volta National Olympic Committee

in Munich
- Competitors: 1 man in 1 sport
- Flag bearer: André Bicaba
- Medals: Gold 0 Silver 0 Bronze 0 Total 0

Summer Olympics appearances (overview)
- 1972; 1976–1984; 1988; 1992; 1996; 2000; 2004; 2008; 2012; 2016; 2020; 2024; 2028

The Republic of Upper Volta (as Upper Volta) competed at the 1972 Summer Olympics in Munich, West Germany. This was the first and only time the country participated under that name at the Olympic Games. However, the first Upper Voltan athletes took part in the Olympics at the 1924 Games as part of the French contingent. André Bicaba was the only athlete representing Upper Volta in 1972, who participated in the men's 100 metres but did not progress past his heat. Upper Volta initially sought to send athletes to the 1976 Summer Olympics, but boycotted it with other Africa nations. By the time it returned to the Games in 1988, the nation was known as Burkina Faso.

== Background ==
The first athlete from Upper Volta to compete in the Olympics was Taka Gangua, who along with Chadian Taki N'Dio, competed in the men's javelin throw as part of the French delegation to the 1924 Summer Games in Paris. French Upper Volta then formed part of French West Africa, a federation of eight French colonial territories. Upper Volta competed under that name for the first and only time at the Summer Olympics in the 1972 Games in Munich, West Germany.

== Athletics ==
Upper Volta was represented by a single athlete in the athletics, André Bicaba, making his only appearance at the Olympics. He took part in the sixth heat of the men's 100 metres, finishing 5th with a time of 10.71 and failing to advance to the quarter-finals.

Following the 1972 Games, Upper Volta considered sending athletes to the 1976 Summer Olympics, but joined with 28 other countries in a boycott after the IOC allowed New Zealand to participate in the Games, despite the breach of the international sports boycott of South Africa by the nation's rugby union team shortly before the Olympics. The majority of the 28 countries in the Olympic boycott were African nations. When the country returned to the Olympics, in 1988, they would be known as Burkina Faso.

Men

Athlete	Event	Heat		Quarterfinal		Semifinal		Final	
Athlete	Event	Result	Rank	Result	Rank	Result	Rank	Result	Rank
André Bicaba	100 metres	10.71	5	did not advance					
