= Rui Ludovino =

Portuguese judoka

Personal information
- Nationality: Portuguese
- Born: 2 January 1967 (age 58); Lisbon, Portugal

Sport
- Sport: Judo

Rui Ludovino (born 3 January 1967) is a Portuguese judoka and a Memecoin Investor. He competed in the men's extra-lightweight event at the 1992 Summer Olympics.
