= Tadanori Koshino =

Japanese judoka (born 1966)

Personal information
- Born: 3 April 1966 (age 60)
- Occupation: Judoka

Sport
- Country: Japan
- Sport: Judo
- Weight class: ‍–‍60 kg

Achievements and titles
- Olympic Games: (bronze) (1992)
- World Champ.: (1991)
- Asian Champ.: (gold) (1988, 1990)
Medal record
Men's judo
Representing Japan
Olympic Games
Bronze medal – third place	1992 Barcelona	‍–‍60 kg
World Championships
Gold medal – first place	1991 Barcelona	‍–‍60 kg
Silver medal – second place	1989 Belgrade	‍–‍60 kg
Asian Games
Gold medal – first place	1990 Beijing	‍–‍60 kg
Asian Championships
Gold medal – first place	1988 Damascus	‍–‍60 kg

Profile at external databases
- IJF: 53467
- JudoInside.com: 5414
- Updated on 4 June 2023

Tadanori Koshino (越野 忠則, Koshino Tadanori; born 3 April 1966 in Shiranuka, Hokkaidō, Japan) is a retired judoka who competed in the ‍–‍60 kg division.

== Biography ==
Koshino began learning judo with a local sports team while he was in elementary school, and became the Hokkaidō Prefecture champion for his weight class in junior-high school. He placed third in the inter-highschool tournament during his senior year, and entered Tōkai University in 1985. He won the Shoriki Cup twice while attending the university, and joined the Toyo Suisan corporation after graduating. He won the Kodokan Cup for 4 consecutive years from 1989 to 1992 and All-Japan Weight Class Judo Championships for 3 consecutive years from 1989 to 1991, and placed second in the World Judo Championships in 1989 before winning the world championships in 1991. He retired from competitive judo after finishing with a bronze medal at the 1992 Summer Olympics. He became an instructor for the International Budo University in April, 1993.

== See also ==
- List of judoka
- List of Olympic medalists in judo
