= Amit Lang =

Israeli CEO and former judoka

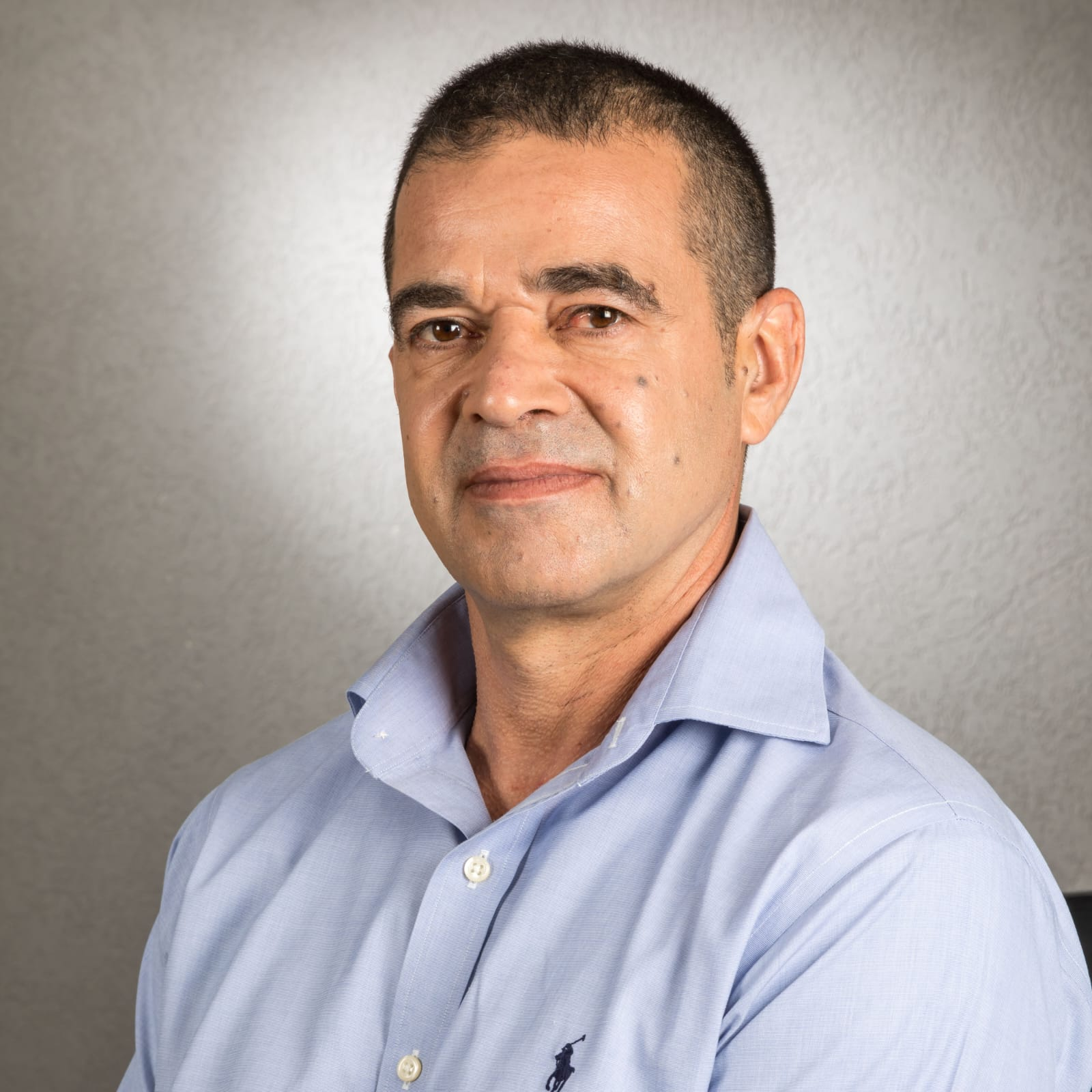

Personal information
- Native name: עמית לנג
- Born: 12 October 1970 (age 55)
- Occupation(s): CEO of Mekorot, the national water company of the State of Israel

Sport
- Country: Israel
- Sport: Judo
- Weight class: –60 kg

Achievements and titles
- World Champ.: R16 (1993)
- European Champ.: 5th (1995)
Medal record
Men's judo
Representing Israel
European Junior Championships
Bronze medal – third place	1990 Ankara	–60 kg

Profile at external databases
- IJF: 53485
- JudoInside.com: 2764
- Updated on 1 February 2022

Amit Lang (Hebrew: עמית לנג; born 12 October 1970) is the CEO of Mekorot, the national water company of the State of Israel. Before this appointment, he served in senior positions in the government and private sectors. Lang is a former Olympic athlete in judo and an Israel judo champion.

== Biography ==
In 1987, he won the under 18 world championship in Guttenberg, and in 1990 he won the bronze medal in the European Judo Championships and seventh place in the World Judo Championships. He participated in the 1992 Olympic Games. in the past, he was an Israeli judoka. He competed in the men's lightweight event at the 1992 Summer Olympics. His highest achievement as an adult came in 1995, when he won fifth place in the European Judo Championships in Birmingham and a bronze medal in the British Open Judo Championship.

Lang began his academic studies following his retirement from judo, earning a B.A. in economics and management from the Academic College of Tel Aviv-Yafo, an M.A. in economics and public policy from Tel Aviv University and an MBA with a major in finance from the College of Management Academic Studies.

From 1999 to 2010, Lang worked in the Budget Department of the Ministry of Finance, where his last position was deputy director of budgets. From 2010 to 2013, Lang served as deputy CEO, of economics, business development, regulation, and operator relations at Partner Communications Ltd. Lang returned to public service to serve as director general of the Ministry of Economy from 2013-2017.

In 2018-2022, Land served as CEO of EMS Mekorot Projects Ltd., a wholly owned subsidiary of Mekorot National Water Company Ltd. In April 2022, Lang was appointed CEO of Mekorot. During his term, Mekorot has been recognized as one of the 60 best water companies in the world by Global Water Intelligence (GWI).

Lang was appointed CEO of Mekorot National Water Company Ltd in April 2022.

During his term, Mekorot has chalked up numerous and diverse achievements:

Mekorot has been recognized as one of the 60 best water companies in the world by Global Water Intelligence (GWI), the international organization that incorporates the operations of hundreds of private and public water companies.

The company’s international operations were also expanded,

advanced technologies were installed, investments in Israeli startup, with an emphasis on energy efficiency, were moved forward.

The company also chalked up important regulator achievements in the annual budget arrangements law and changes were made to water rules. The company has maintained its AAAil credit rating. and, for the first time, was ranked in the ten best companies to work for by CofaceBDi.

== Achievements ==
Year	Tournament	Place	Weight class
1995	European Judo Championships	5th	Extra lightweight (60 kg)
