= Natalie Galea =

Australian judoka

Dr Natalie Galea
Personal information
- Nationality: Australian
- Born: 2 July 1973 (age 51); Sydney, Australia

Sport
- Sport: Judo

Dr Natalie Galea (born 2 July 1973) is an Australian academic who studies gender equality and human rights in the construction sector and in elite sport.

She was an Australian judoka. She competed in the women's half-heavyweight event (72kg) at the 1996 Summer Olympics.
