= Keith Gough =

Irish judoka

Personal information
- Nationality: Irish
- Born: 19 July 1969 (age 56)
- Occupation: Judoka

Sport
- Sport: Judo

Profile at external databases
- JudoInside.com: 2732

Keith Gough (born 19 July 1969) is an Irish judoka. He competed in the men's extra-lightweight event at the 1992 Summer Olympics.
