= Ahmed El-Sayed =

Egyptian judoka (born 1971)

Personal information
- Nationality: Egyptian
- Born: 12 July 1971 (age 53)

Sport
- Sport: Judo

Ahmed El-Sayed (born 12 July 1971) is an Egyptian judoka. He competed in the men's extra-lightweight event at the 1992 Summer Olympics.
