= Burkina Faso at the 2024 Summer Olympics =

- IOC code: BUR
- NOC: Burkinabé National Olympic and Sports Committee

in Paris, France 26 July 2024 – 11 August 2024
- Competitors: 8 (5 men and 3 women) in 5 sports
- Flag bearers (opening): Hugues Fabrice Zango & Marthe Koala
- Flag bearers (closing): Hugues Fabrice Zango & Marthe Koala
- Medals: Gold 0 Silver 0 Bronze 0 Total 0

Summer Olympics appearances (overview)
- 1972; 1976–1984; 1988; 1992; 1996; 2000; 2004; 2008; 2012; 2016; 2020; 2024

Burkina Faso competed at the 2024 Summer Olympics in Paris from 26 July to 11 August 2024. Although the nation made its official debut in Munich 1972 under the name Upper Volta, Burkinabé athletes have appeared in every edition of the Summer Olympics from 1988 onwards, except for three occasions, Montreal 1976, as the nation support for the African led boycott, Moscow 1980, as the nation's support for US led boycott, and LA 1984, as the nation's support for USSR led boycott.

== Competitors ==
The following is the list of number of competitors in the Games.

| Sport | Men | Women | Total |
|---|---|---|---|
| Athletics | 1 | 1 | 2 |
| Cycling | 0 | 1 | 1 |
| Judo | 1 | 0 | 1 |
| Swimming | 1 | 1 | 2 |
| Taekwondo | 2 | 0 | 2 |
| Total | 5 | 3 | 8 |

== Athletics ==
Burkinabé track and field athletes achieved the entry standards for Paris 2024, either by passing the direct qualifying mark (or time for track and road races) or by world ranking, in the following events (a maximum of 3 athletes each):

Key

- Note–Ranks given for track events are within the athlete's heat only
- Q = Qualified for the next round
- q = Qualified for the next round as a fastest loser or, in field events, by position without achieving the qualifying target
- NR = National record
- N/A = Round not applicable for the event
- Bye = Athlete not required to compete in round

Field events

| Athlete | Event | Qualification | | Final | |
| Athlete | Event | Distance | Position | Distance | Position |
|---|---|---|---|---|---|
| Hugues Fabrice Zango | Men's triple jump | 17.16 | 2 Q | 17.50 | 5 |
| Marthe Koala | Women's long jump | 6.59 | 11 Q | 6.61 | 9 |

== Cycling ==
=== Road ===
Burkina Faso entered one rider to compete in the women's road race by finishing in the top two at the 2023 African Championships in Accra, Ghana.

| Athlete | Event | Time | Rank |
|---|---|---|---|
| Awa Bamogo | Women's road race | DNF | |

== Judo ==
Burkina Faso qualified one judoka for the following weight class at the Games. Carmel Kone (men's 90 kg) qualified for the games through the allocations of universality places.

| Athlete | Event | Round of 32 | Round of 16 | Quarterfinals | Semifinals | Repechage | Final / BM | |
| Athlete | Event | Opposition Result | Opposition Result | Opposition Result | Opposition Result | Opposition Result | Opposition Result | Rank |
|---|---|---|---|---|---|---|---|---|
| Carmel Kone | Men's −90 kg | Han J-y (KOR); L 00–10 | Did not advance | | | | | |

== Swimming ==
Burkina Faso sent two swimmers to compete at the 2024 Paris Olympics.

| Athlete | Event | Heat | | Semifinal | | Final | |
| Athlete | Event | Time | Rank | Time | Rank | Time | Rank |
|---|---|---|---|---|---|---|---|
| Souleymane Napare | Men's 50 m freestyle | 26.66 | 59 | Did not advance | | | |
| Iman Kouraogo | Women's 50 m freestyle | 30.33 | 62 | Did not advance | | | |

Qualifiers for the latter rounds (Q) of all events were decided on a time only basis, therefore positions shown are overall results versus competitors in all heats.

== Taekwondo ==
Burkina Faso qualified two athletes to compete at the games. Tokyo 2020 Olympian Faysal Sawadogo and Ibrahim Maïga qualified for Paris 2024 following the triumph of their victory in the semifinal results, in their respective division, at the 2024 African Qualification Tournament in Dakar, Senegal.

| Athlete | Event | Qualification | Round of 16 | Quarterfinals | Semifinals | Repechage | Final / BM | |
| Athlete | Event | Opposition Result | Opposition Result | Opposition Result | Opposition Result | Opposition Result | Opposition Result | Rank |
|---|---|---|---|---|---|---|---|---|
| Ibrahim Maïga | Men's −68 kg | Bye | Reçber (TUR); L 0–2 | Did not advance | | | | |
| Faysal Sawadogo | Men's −80 kg | Bye | Takov (SRB); W 0–2 | Nickolas (USA); L 0–2 | Did not advance | | | |
