= Francis Gómez (judoka) =

Venezuelan judoka (born 1968)

Personal information
- Born: October 1, 1968 (age 57)
Medal record
Women's Judo
Representing Venezuela
Pan American Games
Silver medal – second place	1995 Mar del Plata	Half-Heavyweight
Bronze medal – third place	1987 Indianapolis	Open Class
Bronze medal – third place	1991 Havana	Middleweight

Francis Gómez (born October 1, 1968) is a retired female judoka from Venezuela. She competed for her native South American country at the 1996 Summer Olympics, where she lost in the semifinals of the Women's Half-Heavyweight (– 72 kg) division to France's Estha Essombe. Gómez claimed a total number of three medals during her career at the Pan American Games.
