= Hannah Ertel =

German judoka

Personal information
- Nationality: German
- Born: 5 August 1978 (age 46); Würzburg, West Germany

Sport
- Sport: Judo

Hannah Ertel (born 5 August 1978) is a German judoka. She competed in the women's half-heavyweight event at the 1996 Summer Olympics.
