= Youssef Omar Isahak =

Djiboutian judoka (born 1969)

Youssef Omar Isahak (born 30 October 1969) is a Djiboutian judoka.

Isahak competed at the 1992 Summer Olympics held in Barcelona, he entered the extra-lightweight class and after receiving a bye in the first round he was eliminated by Polish judoka Piotr Kamrowski.
