= József Wágner =

Hungarian judoka

Personal information
- Nationality: Hungarian
- Born: 16 January 1961 (age 64); Devecser, Hungary
- Occupation: Judoka

Sport
- Sport: Judo

Profile at external databases
- JudoInside.com: 2725

József Wágner (born 16 January 1961) is a Hungarian judoka. He competed in the men's extra-lightweight event at the 1992 Summer Olympics.
