= 1988 World Sambo Championships =

Sambo competitions

The 1988 World Sambo Championships were held in Montreal, Quebec, Canada in December 1988. Championships were organized by FIAS. There were 65 participants from 11 countries: USSR, Mongolia, Bulgaria, USA, France, Italy, Japan, Great Britain, Israel, Canada, and Spain.

== Medal overview ==
men	Gold	Silver	Bronze
-48 kg	(Soviet Union) Ceyhun Məmmədov (URS)^{AZE}	(Bulgaria) Dimitar Dimitrov (BUL)	(Mongolia) Ochirbat Tsogtgerel (MGL)
-52 kg	(Soviet Union) Gurgen Tutkhalyan (URS)^{ARM}	(Mongolia) D. Bayaraa (MGL)	(Japan) T. Takeuchi (JPN)
-57 kg	(Soviet Union) Anton Novikov (URS)^{RUS}	(Bulgaria) Nikolai Gushmakov (BUL)	(Mongolia) Khaltmaagiin Battulga (MGL)
-62 kg	(Soviet Union) Gagik Ghazaryan (URS)^{ARM}	(United States) Clinton Burke (USA)	(Mongolia) Dashgombyn Battulga (MGL)
-68 kg	(Soviet Union) Evgeniy Yesin (URS)^{RUS}	(Spain) Alberto Niet (ESP)o	(Bulgaria) Ivan Netov (BUL)
-74 kg	(Soviet Union) Vasily Shvaya (URS)^{RUS}	(Bulgaria) Boyko Nikolov (BUL)	(United States) Matt Vondrasek (USA)
-82 kg	(Soviet Union) Hussein Khaibulaev (URS)^{RUS}	(France) Didier Duru (FRA)	(Bulgaria) Ivo Nenkov (BUL)
-90 kg	(Soviet Union) Tagir Abdulayev (URS)^{RUS}	(United States) Ron Tripp (USA)	(Japan) Tadatomi Ida (JPN)
-100 kg	(Soviet Union) Vladimir Gurin (URS)^{RUS}	(Italy) Giorgio D'Alessandro (ITA)	(France) D. Geiger (FRA)
+100 kg	(Soviet Union) Vladimir Shkalov (URS)^{RUS}	(Canada) Mark Berger (CAN)	(Bulgaria) Mincho Petkov (BUL)
