= Burkina Faso at the 2020 Summer Olympics =

- IOC code: BUR
- NOC: Burkinabé National Olympic and Sports Committee

in Tokyo, Japan July 23, 2021 – August 8, 2021
- Competitors: 7 in 5 sports
- Flag bearers (opening): Angelika Ouedraogo; Hugues Fabrice Zango
- Flag bearer (closing): N/A
- Medals Ranked 86th: Gold 0 Silver 0 Bronze 1 Total 1

Summer Olympics appearances (overview)
- 1972; 1976–1984; 1988; 1992; 1996; 2000; 2004; 2008; 2012; 2016; 2020; 2024

Burkina Faso competed at the 2020 Summer Olympics in Tokyo. Originally scheduled to take place from 24 July to 9 August 2020, the Games were postponed to 23 July to 8 August 2021, because of the COVID-19 pandemic. It was the nation's tenth appearance at the Summer Olympics, having participated since the 1972 Summer Olympics in Munich under the name Upper Volta.

Hugues Fabrice Zango won Burkina Faso's first ever Olympic medal, earning the bronze in the men's triple jump.

== Medalists ==
Medal	Name	Sport	Event	Date
Bronze	Hugues Fabrice Zango	Athletics	Men's triple jump	5 August

== Competitors ==
The following is the list of number of competitors in the Games.

Sport	Men	Women	Total
Athletics	1	1	2
Cycling	1	0	1
Judo	1	0	1
Swimming	1	1	2
Taekwondo	1	0	1
Total	5	2	7

== Athletics ==
Burkinabé athletes achieved the entry standards, either by qualifying time or by world ranking, in the following track and field events (up to a maximum of 3 athletes in each event):

Key

- Note–Ranks given for track events are within the athlete's heat only
- Q = Qualified for the next round
- q = Qualified for the next round as a fastest loser or, in field events, by position without achieving the qualifying target
- NR = National record
- N/A = Round not applicable for the event
- Bye = Athlete not required to compete in round

Track & road events

Athlete	Event	Heat		Semifinal		Final	
Athlete	Event	Result	Rank	Result	Rank	Result	Rank
Marthe Koala	Women's 100 m hurdles	13.11	6	Did not advance			

Field events

Athlete	Event	Qualification		Final	
Athlete	Event	Distance	Position	Distance	Position
Hugues Fabrice Zango	Men's triple jump	16.83	12 q	17.47	3rd place, bronze medalist(s)

Combined events – Women's heptathlon

Athlete	Event	100H	HJ	SP	200 m	LJ	JT	800 m	Final	Rank
Marthe Koala	Result	13.07	1.74	12.94	DNS	DNS	DNS	DNS	DNF	
Marthe Koala	Points	1114	903	697	—	—	—	—	DNF	

== Cycling ==
=== Road ===
Burkina Faso entered one rider to compete in the men's road race for the first time, by finishing in the top two, not yet qualified, at the 2019 African Championships in Addis Ababa, Ethiopia.

Athlete	Event	Time	Rank
Paul Daumont	Men's road race	Did not finish	

== Judo ==
Burkina Faso qualified one judoka for the men's lightweight category (73 kg). Lucas Diallo received a continental berth from Africa as the nation's top-ranked judoka outside of direct qualifying position in the IJF World Ranking List of June 28, 2021.

Athlete	Event	Round of 64	Round of 32	Round of 16	Quarterfinals	Semifinals	Repechage	Final / BM	
Athlete	Event	Opposition Result	Opposition Result	Opposition Result	Opposition Result	Opposition Result	Opposition Result	Opposition Result	Rank
Lucas Diallo	Men's −73 kg	Bye	Bessi (MON); L 00–10	Did not advance					

== Swimming ==
Burkina Faso received two universality invitations from FINA to send.

Athlete	Event	Heat		Semifinal		Final	
Athlete	Event	Time	Rank	Time	Rank	Time	Rank
Adama Ouedraogo	Men's 50 m freestyle	25.22	54	Did not advance			
Angelika Ouedraogo	Women's 50 m freestyle	28.38	58	Did not advance			

== Taekwondo ==
Burkina Faso received an invitation from the Tripartite Commission and the World Taekwondo Federation to allow Faysal Sawadogo to compete in the men's welterweight category (80 kg).

Athlete	Event	Round of 16	Quarterfinals	Semifinals	Repechage	Final / BM	
Athlete	Event	Opposition Result	Opposition Result	Opposition Result	Opposition Result	Opposition Result	Rank
Faysal Sawadogo	Men's −80 kg	Khramtsov (ROC); L 6–13	Did not advance		Kanaet (CRO); L 10–30	Did not advance	7
