= Yen Kuo-che =

Taiwanese judoka (born 1970)

Personal information
- Nationality: Taiwanese
- Born: 5 December 1970 (age 55)
- Occupation: Judoka

Sport
- Sport: Judo
Medal record
Representing Chinese Taipei
Asian Games
Bronze medal – third place	1990 Beijing	Open

Profile at external databases
- JudoInside.com: 10267

Yen Kuo-che (born 5 December 1970) is a Taiwanese judoka. He competed in the men's half-heavyweight event at the 2000 Summer Olympics.
