= Marie Michele St. Louis =

Mauritian judoka (1968–2024)

Personal information
- Nationality: Mauritian
- Born: 16 November 1968
- Died: 6 September 2024 (aged 55)

Sport
- Sport: Judo

Marie Michele St. Louis Durhone (16 November 1968 – 6 September 2024) was a Mauritian judoka. She competed in the women's half-heavyweight event at the 1996 Summer Olympics.

St. Louis died on 6 September 2024, at the age of 55.
