= Josie Horton =

British judoka (born 1968)

Personal information
- Nationality: British (English)
- Born: 17 November 1968 (age 56); Croydon, England
- Occupation: Judoka

Sport
- Sport: Judo
- Weight class: –72 kg

Profile at external databases
- JudoInside.com: 2300

Josephine Horton (born 17 November 1968) is a British judoka. She competed in the women's half-heavyweight event at the 1992 Summer Olympics. She became champion of Great Britain, winning the light heavyweight division at the British Judo Championships in 1990.
