= Heli Syrjä =

Finnish judoka

Personal information
- Nationality: Finnish
- Born: 27 November 1967 (age 57); Kajaani, Finland

Sport
- Sport: Judo

Heli Syrjä (born 27 November 1967) is a Finnish judoka. She competed in the women's half-heavyweight event at the 1992 Summer Olympics.
