= Manfred Hiptmair =

Austrian judoka

Personal information
- Nationality: Austria
- Born: 24 December 1965 (age 59); Schwanenstadt, Austria
- Occupation: Judoka

Sport
- Sport: Judo

Profile at external databases
- JudoInside.com: 3199

Manfred Hiptmair (born 24 December 1965) is an Austrian judoka. He competed in the men's extra-lightweight event at the 1992 Summer Olympics.
