= Yoko Tanabe =

Japanese judoka (born 1966)

Personal information
- Born: 28 January 1966 (age 60) Tokyo, Japan
- Occupation: Judoka

Sport
- Country: Japan
- Sport: Judo
- Weight class: ‍–‍72 kg

Achievements and titles
- Olympic Games: (silver) (1992, 1996)
- World Champ.: (silver) (1989, 1991)
- Asian Champ.: (gold) (1990, 1991)
Medal record
Women's judo
Representing Japan
Olympic Games
Silver medal – second place	1992 Barcelona	‍–‍72 kg
Silver medal – second place	1996 Atlanta	‍–‍72 kg
Bronze medal – third place	1988 Seoul	‍–‍72 kg
World Championships
Silver medal – second place	1989 Belgrade	‍–‍72 kg
Silver medal – second place	1991 Barcelona	‍–‍72 kg
Bronze medal – third place	1987 Essen	‍–‍72 kg
Bronze medal – third place	1989 Belgrade	Open
Bronze medal – third place	1995 Chiba	‍–‍72 kg
Asian Games
Gold medal – first place	1990 Beijing	‍–‍72 kg
Bronze medal – third place	1990 Beijing	Open
Asian Championships
Gold medal – first place	1991 Osaka	‍–‍72 kg

Profile at external databases
- IJF: 17944
- JudoInside.com: 2971
- Updated on 4 June 2023

Yoko Tanabe (田辺 陽子, Tanabe Yōko; born 28 January 1966 in Tokyo) is a Japanese retired judoka.

Tanabe won two Olympic silver medals in the half-heavyweight (‍–‍72 kg) division, in 1992 and 1996. She won the All-Japan judo championships six times (1987‍–‍1992). She also won a bronze medal in the ‍–‍72 kg at the 1988 Summer Olympics in Seoul, where women's judo was held as a demonstration sport.
