= Katarina Håkansson =

Swedish judoka

Personal information
- Nationality: Swedish
- Born: 18 March 1966 (age 59); Uppsala, Sweden

Sport
- Sport: Judo

Katarina Håkansson (born 18 March 1966) is a Swedish judoka. She competed in the women's half-heavyweight event at the 1992 Summer Olympics.
