= Regina Schüttenhelm =

German judoka

Personal information
- Nationality: German
- Born: 9 July 1964 (age 61) Siegen, West Germany

Sport
- Sport: Judo

Regina Schüttenhelm (born 9 July 1964) is a German former judoka. She competed in the women's half-heavyweight event at the 1992 Summer Olympics.
