= Philippe Pradayrol =

French judoka

Personal information
- Nationality: French
- Born: 16 June 1966; Avignon, France
- Died: 8 December 1993 (aged 27); Bouches-du-Rhone, France

Sport
- Sport: Judo

Philippe Pradayrol (16 June 1966 – 8 December 1993) was a French judoka. He competed in the men's extra-lightweight event at the 1992 Summer Olympics.

He died as result of a traffic accident in December 1993.
