= Judo at the 1990 Asian Games =

Judo competition

- Venue: Yuetan Gymnasium
- Dates: 28 September – 1 October 1990

The Judo competition at the 1990 Asian Games was contested in sixteen weight classes, eight each for men and women.

== Medalists ==
=== Men ===
Event	Gold	Silver	Bronze
Extra lightweight (−60 kg)	Tadanori Koshino; Japan	Kim Jong-man; South Korea	Pak Hak-yong; North Korea
Extra lightweight (−60 kg)	Tadanori Koshino; Japan	Kim Jong-man; South Korea	Dashgombyn Battulga; Mongolia
Half lightweight (−65 kg)	Masahiko Okuma; Japan	Kim Jong-soo; South Korea	Gao Erwei; China
Half lightweight (−65 kg)	Masahiko Okuma; Japan	Kim Jong-soo; South Korea	Huang Chien-lung; Chinese Taipei
Lightweight (−71 kg)	Chung Hoon; South Korea	Ri Chang-su; North Korea	Artagiin Buyanjargal; Mongolia
Lightweight (−71 kg)	Chung Hoon; South Korea	Ri Chang-su; North Korea	Toshihiko Koga; Japan
Half middleweight (−78 kg)	Kim Byung-joo; South Korea	Li Jinshan; China	Yoshiyuki Takanami; Japan
Half middleweight (−78 kg)	Kim Byung-joo; South Korea	Li Jinshan; China	Liaw Der-cheng; Chinese Taipei
Middleweight (−86 kg)	Hirotaka Okada; Japan	Kim Seung-gyu; South Korea	Pak Jong-chol; North Korea
Middleweight (−86 kg)	Hirotaka Okada; Japan	Kim Seung-gyu; South Korea	Zhao Zhishan; China
Half heavyweight (−95 kg)	Yasuhiro Kai; Japan	Jiang Fabin; China	Pak Ung-goi; North Korea
Half heavyweight (−95 kg)	Yasuhiro Kai; Japan	Jiang Fabin; China	Baek Jang-ki; South Korea
Heavyweight (+95 kg)	Hwang Jae-gil; North Korea	Badmaanyambuugiin Bat-Erdene; Mongolia	Naoya Ogawa; Japan
Heavyweight (+95 kg)	Hwang Jae-gil; North Korea	Badmaanyambuugiin Bat-Erdene; Mongolia	Kim Kun-soo; South Korea
Openweight	Hideyuki Sekine; Japan	Kim Kun-soo; South Korea	Badmaanyambuugiin Bat-Erdene; Mongolia
Openweight	Hideyuki Sekine; Japan	Kim Kun-soo; South Korea	Yen Kuo-che; Chinese Taipei

=== Women ===
Event	Gold	Silver	Bronze
Extra lightweight (−48 kg)	Fumiko Ezaki; Japan	Li Aiyue; China	Huang Yu-hsin; Chinese Taipei
Extra lightweight (−48 kg)	Fumiko Ezaki; Japan	Li Aiyue; China	Ok Kyung-sook; South Korea
Half lightweight (−52 kg)	Mutsumi Ueda; Japan	Chang Fengxia; China	Yu Wai Seung; Hong Kong
Half lightweight (−52 kg)	Mutsumi Ueda; Japan	Chang Fengxia; China	Park Mi-hee; South Korea
Lightweight (−56 kg)	Li Zhongyun; China	Tsay Shwu-huey; Chinese Taipei	Cho Min-sun; South Korea
Lightweight (−56 kg)	Li Zhongyun; China	Tsay Shwu-huey; Chinese Taipei	Prateep Pinitwung; Thailand
Half middleweight (−61 kg)	Jin Xianglan; China	Takako Kobayashi; Japan	Kim Sung-hye; South Korea
Half middleweight (−61 kg)	Jin Xianglan; China	Takako Kobayashi; Japan	Liaw Tien-ying; Chinese Taipei
Middleweight (−66 kg)	Zhang Di; China	Ryoko Fujimoto; Japan	Thandar Sit Naing; Myanmar
Middleweight (−66 kg)	Zhang Di; China	Ryoko Fujimoto; Japan	Park Ji-yeong; South Korea
Half heavyweight (−72 kg)	Yoko Tanabe; Japan	Wu Weifeng; China	Pujawati Utama; Indonesia
Half heavyweight (−72 kg)	Yoko Tanabe; Japan	Wu Weifeng; China	Kim Mi-jung; South Korea
Heavyweight (+72 kg)	Zhang Ying; China	Kaori Suzuki; Japan	Moon Ji-yoon; South Korea
Heavyweight (+72 kg)	Zhang Ying; China	Kaori Suzuki; Japan	Chen Mei-huey; Chinese Taipei
Openweight	Zhuang Xiaoyan; China	Moon Ji-yoon; South Korea	Yoko Tanabe; Japan
Openweight	Zhuang Xiaoyan; China	Moon Ji-yoon; South Korea	Chen Ling-jen; Chinese Taipei

== Medal table ==
Rank	Nation	Gold	Silver	Bronze	Total
1	Japan (JPN)	8	3	4	15
2	China (CHN)	5	5	2	12
3	South Korea (KOR)	2	5	9	16
4	North Korea (PRK)	1	1	3	5
5	Chinese Taipei (TPE)	0	1	7	8
6	Mongolia (MGL)	0	1	3	4
7	Hong Kong (HKG)	0	0	1	1
7	Indonesia (INA)	0	0	1	1
7	Myanmar (MYA)	0	0	1	1
7	Thailand (THA)	0	0	1	1
Totals (10 entries)		16	16	32	64
