= Diadenis Luna =

Cuban judoka (born 1975)

Personal information
- Full name: Diadenis Luna Castellano
- Born: 11 September 1975 (age 50) Santiago de Cuba, Cuba
- Occupation: Judoka

Sport
- Country: Cuba
- Sport: Judo
- Weight class: ‍–‍72 kg, ‍–‍78 kg

Achievements and titles
- Olympic Games: (bronze) (1996)
- World Champ.: (1995)
- Pan American Champ.: (1997, 1998)
Medal record
Women's judo
Representing Cuba
Olympic Games
Bronze medal – third place	1996 Atlanta	‍–‍72 kg
World Championships
Gold medal – first place	1995 Chiba	‍–‍72 kg
Silver medal – second place	1997 Paris	‍–‍72 kg
Bronze medal – third place	1999 Birmingham	‍–‍78 kg
Pan American Games
Gold medal – first place	1995 Mara del Plata	‍–‍72 kg
Gold medal – first place	1999 Winnipeg	‍–‍78 kg
Pan American Championships
Gold medal – first place	1997 Guadalajara	‍–‍72 kg
Gold medal – first place	1998 Santo Domingo	‍–‍78 kg
Summer Universiade
Silver medal – second place	1995 Fukuoka	‍–‍72 kg

Profile at external databases
- IJF: 53174
- JudoInside.com: 962
- Updated on 4 June 2023

Diadenis Luna Castellano (born 11 September 1975) is a Cuban judoka. At the 1996 Summer Olympics she won a bronze medal in the women's Half Heavyweight (‍–‍72 kg) category, together with Ylenia Scapin.
