= Irene de Kok =

Dutch judoka (born 1963)

Personal information
- Full name: Irene Margreta Maria de Kok
- Born: 29 August 1963 (age 62)
- Occupation: Judoka

Sport
- Country: Netherlands
- Sport: Judo
- Weight class: ‍–‍66 kg, ‍–‍72 kg, Open

Achievements and titles
- Olympic Games: (bronze) (1992)
- World Champ.: (1986, 1987)
- European Champ.: (gold) (1986, 1986, 1987)
Medal record
Women's judo
Representing the Netherlands
Olympic Games
Bronze medal – third place	1992 Barcelona	‍–‍72 kg
World Championships
Gold medal – first place	1986 Maastricht	‍–‍72 kg
Gold medal – first place	1987 Essen	‍–‍72 kg
Silver medal – second place	1984 Vienna	‍–‍66 kg
European Championships
Gold medal – first place	1986 London	‍–‍72 kg
Gold medal – first place	1986 London	Open
Gold medal – first place	1987 Paris	‍–‍72 kg
Bronze medal – third place	1984 Pirmasens	‍–‍66 kg
Bronze medal – third place	1987 Paris	Open
Bronze medal – third place	1992 Paris	‍–‍72 kg

Profile at external databases
- IJF: 53883
- JudoInside.com: 1454
- Updated on 5 June 2023

Irene Margreta Maria de Kok (born 29 August 1963 in Eindhoven, North Brabant) is a retired judoka from the Netherlands, who is a two-fold world-champion and represented Netherlands at the 1992 Summer Olympics in Barcelona, Spain.

There de Kok won a bronze medal in the women's half-heavyweight division (‍–‍72 kg), alongside Laetitia Meignan from France. She was named Dutch Sportswoman of the Year in 1987 after having claimed her second world title.

Awards
Preceded by Nelli Cooman	Dutch Sportswoman of the Year; 1987	Succeeded by Yvonne van Gennip
