= Kim Byung-joo (judoka) =

South Korean judoka (born 1968)

Personal information
- Born: 14 January 1968 (age 58)
- Occupation: Judoka

Korean name
- Hangul: 김병주
- Hanja: 金炳周
- RR: Gim Byeongju
- MR: Kim Pyŏngju

Sport
- Country: South Korea
- Sport: Judo
- Weight class: ‍–‍78 kg

Achievements and titles
- Olympic Games: (bronze) (1992)
- World Champ.: (gold) (1989)
- Asian Champ.: (gold) (1990)
Medal record
Men's judo
Representing South Korea
Olympic Games
Bronze medal – third place	1992 Barcelona	‍–‍78 kg
World Championships
Gold medal – first place	1989 Belgrade	‍–‍78 kg
Asian Games
Gold medal – first place	1990 Beijing	‍–‍78 kg

Profile at external databases
- IJF: 62630, 14997
- JudoInside.com: 6089
- Updated on 5 June 2023

Kim Byung-Joo (born 14 January 1968 in Daegu) is a retired South Korean judoka and a professor.

== Career ==
Kim won the gold medal in the ‍–‍78 kg class at the 1989 World Judo Championships in Belgrade. Kim represented South Korea at the 1992 Summer Olympics, winning bronze in the half middleweight division.

Kim is currently serving as a professor for Korea Air Force Academy.

Kim is married to judoka Kim Mi-jung.
