= Tiffany Day (judoka) =

Australian judoka (1990–2019)

Personal information
- Nationality: Australia
- Born: 1 February 1990 Toowoomba, Australia
- Died: 9 April 2019 (aged 29)
- Height: 1.54 m (5 ft 1/2 in)
- Weight: 49 kg (108 lb)

Sport
- Sport: Judo
- Event: 48 kg
- Club: Pittsworth Judo Club
- Coached by: Patrick Mahoon

Tiffany Day was an Australian judoka, who played for the extra-lightweight category. She was a 2007 Australian judo champion for her weight division, and a member of Pittsworth Judo Club under her personal coach, Patrick Mahoon.

Day represented Australia at the 2008 Summer Olympics in Beijing, where she competed for the women's extra-lightweight class (48 kg). She received a bye for the second preliminary round match, before losing out to Argentina's Paula Pareto, who successfully scored an ippon (full point) with a yoko shiho gatame (side four quarter hold), at one minute and twenty seconds.

Tiffany Day died unexpectedly on 9 April 2019 at the age of 29.
