= Tetiana Beliaieva =

Ukrainian judoka

Personal information
- Nationality: Ukrainian
- Born: 2 October 1971 (age 53)

Sport
- Sport: Judo

Tetiana Beliaieva (born 2 October 1971) is a Ukrainian judoka. She competed at the 1996 Summer Olympics and the 2000 Summer Olympics.
