= Michaela Baschin =

German judoka (born 1984)

Personal information
- Born: 2 June 1984 (age 42)
- Occupation: Judoka
- Height: 1.63 m (5 ft 4 in)

Sport
- Country: Germany
- Sport: Judo
- Weight class: ‍–‍48 kg
- Rank: 3rd dan black belt
- Club: TSG Backnang
- Coached by: Wolf-Rüdiger Schulz

Achievements and titles
- Olympic Games: 9th (2008)
- World Champ.: R16 (2009)
- European Champ.: (bronze) (2006, 2009)
Medal record
Women's judo
Representing Germany
European Championships
Bronze medal – third place	2006 Tampere	‍–‍48 kg
Bronze medal – third place	2009 Tbilisi	‍–‍48 kg
European Junior Championships
Bronze medal – third place	2003 Sarajevo	‍–‍48 kg

Profile at external databases
- IJF: 547
- JudoInside.com: 17796
- Updated on 16 November 2022

Michaela Baschin (born 2 June 1984) is a German judoka, competing in the 48 kg-category. Baschin, who is currently ranked at 3rd Dan, won bronze medals at the 2006 and the 2009 European Judo Championships. She competed in the 2008 Summer Olympics.
