= Nazim Huseynov =

Azerbaijani Olympic judoka

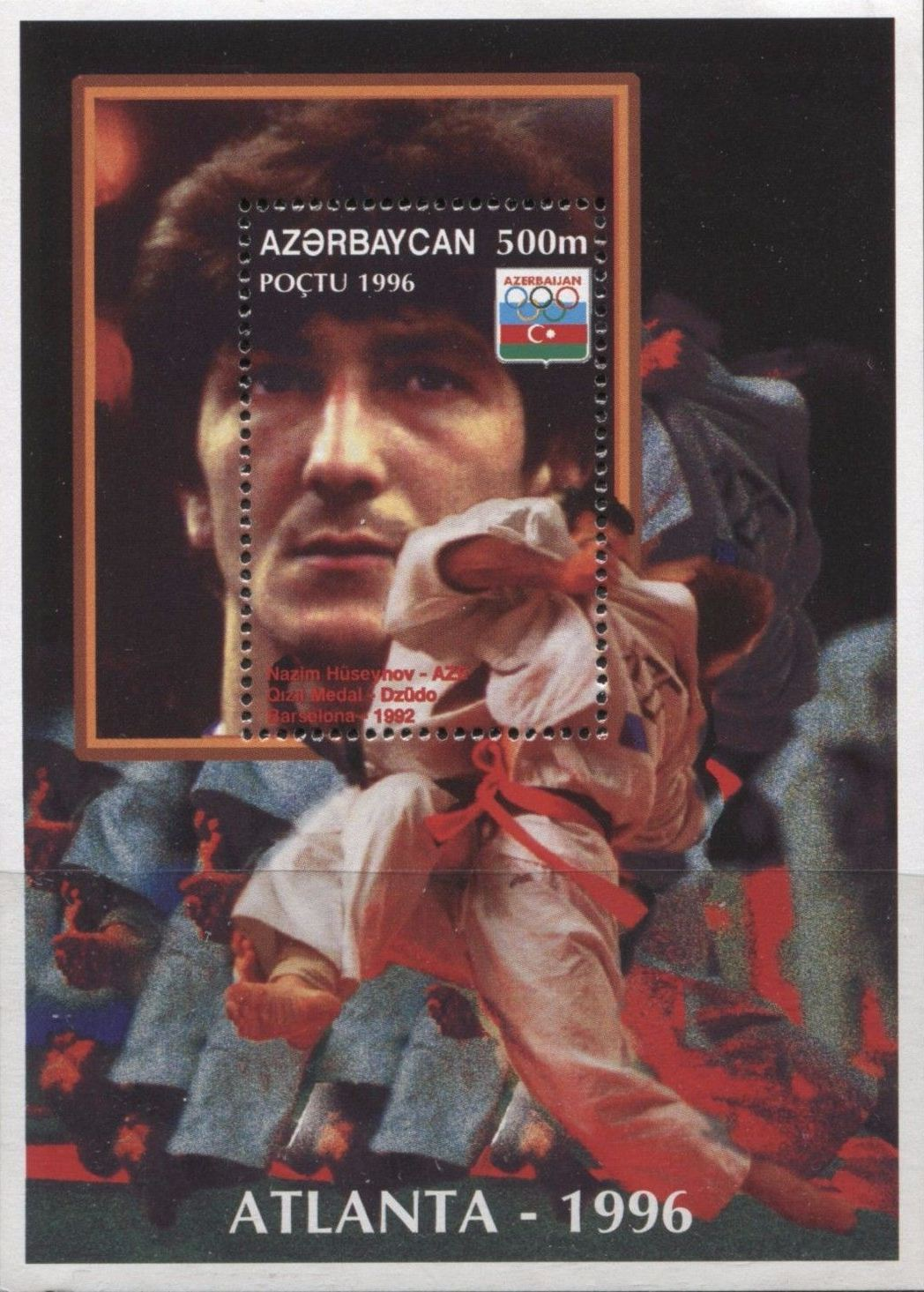
- Huseynov on a 1996 Azerbaijani stamp

Personal information
- Born: 2 August 1969 (age 56)
- Occupation: Judoka

Sport
- Country: Azerbaijan
- Sport: Judo
- Weight class: –‍60 kg

Achievements and titles
- Olympic Games: (gold) (1992)
- World Champ.: (silver) (1993)
- European Champ.: (gold) (1992, 1993)
Medal record
Men's judo
Representing Unified Team
Olympic Games
Gold medal – first place	1992 Barcelona	‍–‍60 kg
Representing Azerbaijan
World Championships
Silver medal – second place	1993 Hamilton	‍–‍60 kg
European Championships
Gold medal – first place	1992 Paris	‍–‍60 kg
Gold medal – first place	1993 Athens	‍–‍60 kg
Silver medal – second place	1994 Gdansk	‍–‍60 kg
Representing Soviet Union
World Championships
Bronze medal – third place	1991 Barcelona	‍–‍60 kg

Profile at external databases
- IJF: 53465, 53293
- JudoInside.com: 1903
- Updated on 4 June 2023

Nazim Huseynov (Azerbaijani: Nazim Hüseynov; born 2 August 1969 in Baku, Azerbaijan SSR, Soviet Union) is an Azerbaijani judoka who won the Men's ‍–‍60 kg in the 1992 Summer Olympics, competing for the Unified Team.

== Biography ==
In 1992, Nazim Huseynov became the first Azerbaijani judoka to win an Olympic gold. Prior to the 1992 Olympics Huseynov won bronze at the 1991 World Judo Championships and the European title at the 1992 European Judo Championships and established himself as one of the top extra-lightweight judokas in the world.

After the 1992 Olympics and the fall of Soviet Union Hüseynov continued to compete, now representing his native Azerbaijan. In 1993 he defended his European title and won silver medal at the 1993 World Championships held in Hamilton.

In 1994, Huseynov won silver at the European Championships, but fell off his form after that year and retired from sports in 2000, working as a judo coach.

== Achievements ==
Year	Tournament	Place	Weight class
1995	World Judo Championships	5th	Extra lightweight (60 kg)
1994	European Judo Championships	2nd	Extra lightweight (60 kg)
1993	World Judo Championships	2nd	Extra lightweight (60 kg)
1993	European Judo Championships	1st	Extra lightweight (60 kg)
1992	Olympic Games	1st	Extra lightweight (60 kg)
1992	European Judo Championships	1st	Extra lightweight (60 kg)
1991	World Judo Championships	3rd	Extra lightweight (60 kg)

Olympic Games
Preceded by Did not participate	Flagbearer for Azerbaijan; Atlanta 1996	Succeeded by Namig Abdullayev
