= Haldun Efemgil =

Turkish judoka

Personal information
- Nationality: Turkish
- Born: 7 September 1966 (age 58)
- Occupation: Judoka

Sport
- Sport: Judo

Haldun Efemgil (born 7 September 1966) is a Turkish judoka. He competed at the 1988 Summer Olympics and the 1992 Summer Olympics.
