= Tony Okada =

American judoka

Tony Okada is a former member of the US Judo Olympic Team. He competed in the 1992 Summer Olympics.
