= Marino Cattedra =

Italian judoka (born 1965)

Personal information
- Nationality: Italian
- Born: 15 February 1965 (age 60); Bitritto, Italy

Sport
- Sport: Judo

Marino Cattedra (born 15 February 1965) is an Italian judoka. He competed at the 1988 Summer Olympics and the 1992 Summer Olympics.
