= Kim Mi-jung (judoka, born 1971) =

South Korean judoka

Personal information
- Born: 29 March 1971 (age 55) Masan, Gyeongsangnam-do
- Occupation: Judoka

Korean name
- Hangul: 김미정
- Hanja: 金美廷
- RR: Gim Mijeong
- MR: Kim Mijŏng

Sport
- Country: South Korea
- Sport: Judo
- Weight class: ‍–‍72 kg

Achievements and titles
- Olympic Games: (gold) (1992)
- World Champ.: (gold) (1991)
- Asian Champ.: (gold) (1994)
Medal record
Women's judo
Representing South Korea
Olympic Games
Gold medal – first place	1992 Barcelona	‍–‍72 kg
World Championships
Gold medal – first place	1991 Barcelona	‍–‍72 kg
Bronze medal – third place	1993 Hamilton	‍–‍72 kg
Asian Games
Gold medal – first place	1994 Hiroshima	‍–‍72 kg
Bronze medal – third place	1990 Beijing	‍–‍72 kg
Asian Championships
Silver medal – second place	1993 Macau	‍–‍72 kg

Profile at external databases
- IJF: 11423
- JudoInside.com: 3701
- Updated on 5 June 2023

Kim Mi-Jung (born 29 March 1971 in Masan, Gyeongsangnam-do) is a female South Korean retired judoka.

== Biography ==
She was a shot putter in high school but changed to be a judoka at the age of 17, and in a year Kim was selected to be a member of the South Korean national judo team in 1989.

Next year, Kim won bronze at the 1990 Asian Games in Beijing, and in 1991 she became her world champion in the 72 kg division at the World Championships in Barcelona.

At the 1992 Summer Olympics she finally won the Olympic gold medal in the women's Half Heavyweight (‍–‍72 kg) category.

Kim retired from competitive judo after winning gold in the 1994 Asian Game. She has been serving as a judo coach and professor for Yong-In University, South Korea.

She is married to judoka Kim Byung-joo.
