= Carlos Noriega (judoka) =

Bolivian judoka

Personal information
- Full name: Carlos Marcelo Noriega Rocha
- Nationality: Bolivian
- Born: 27 February 1972 (age 53)

Sport
- Sport: Judo

Carlos Marcelo Noriega Rocha (Note: In this Hispanic American name, the first or paternal surname is Noriega and the second or maternal family name is Rocha.) (born 27 February 1972) is a Bolivian judoka. He competed in the men's extra-lightweight event at the 1992 Summer Olympics.
