= Willis García =

Venezuelan judoka (born 1970)

Personal information
- Born: July 29, 1970 (age 55)

Sport
- Sport: Judo
Medal record
Representing Venezuela
Pan American Games
Bronze medal – third place	1991 Havana	Flyweight

Willis Bernardo García Estrada (born July 29, 1970) is a retired male judoka from Venezuela.

García claimed the bronze medal in the Men's Flyweight (– 56 kg) division at the 1991 Pan American Games in Havana, Cuba, alongside Brazil's Sumio Tsujimoto. He represented his native country at the 1992 Summer Olympics in Barcelona, Spain, finishing in seventh place (tied).
