= Shigueto Yamasaki =

Brazilian judoka (born 1966)

Personal information
- Born: July 30, 1966 (age 59)
Medal record
Men's Judo
Representing Brazil
Pan American Games
| Gold medal – first place | 1991 Havana | Bantamweight |

Shigueto Yamasaki Júnior (born July 30, 1966) is a retired male judoka from Brazil.

Yamasaki claimed the gold medal in the Men's Bantamweight (– 60 kg) division at the 1991 Pan American Games in Havana, Cuba. In the final he defeated Canada's Ewan Beaton. He represented his native country at the 1992 Summer Olympics.

He is the cousin of Mario Yamasaki.
