= Tombi Devi =

Indian judoka

Personal information
- Born: 1 January 1982 (age 43)
- Occupation: Judoka

Sport
- Sport: Judo

Profile at external databases
- JudoInside.com: 14014

Khumujam Tombi Devi (born 1 January 1982) is an Indian judoka, who represented her country at the 2008 Summer Olympics in Beijing. She participated in the 48 kg category, but lost to Portugal's Ana Hormigo in the preliminary round.

== See also ==
- India at the 2008 Summer Olympics
