= Ali Heidar Ali Mohamed =

Kuwaiti judoka

Personal information
- Native name: علي حيدر علي محمد
- Nationality: Kuwaiti
- Height: 170 cm (5 ft 7 in)
- Weight: 60 kg (132 lb)

Sport
- Country: Kuwait
- Sport: Judo

Ali Heidar Ali Mohamed (Arabic: علي حيدر علي محمد) is a Kuwaiti judoka. He competed at the 1980 Summer Olympics and the 1992 Summer Olympics.
