= Hanatou Ouelogo =

Burkinabe Olympic judoka

Personal information
- Full name: Konkiswinde Hanatou Ouelogo
- Nationality: Burkina Faso
- Born: 5 August 1978 (age 47)
- Occupation: Judoka
- Height: 1.51 m (4 ft 11 1/2 in)
- Weight: 48 kg (106 lb)

Sport
- Sport: Judo
- Event: 48 kg
Medal record
Women's judo
Representing Burkina Faso
AJU African Championships
Silver medal – second place	2004 Tunis	48 kg

Profile at external databases
- JudoInside.com: 27536

Konkiswinde Hanatou Ouelogo (born August 5, 1978) is a Burkinabé judoka, who played for the extra-lightweight category. She won the silver medal at the 2004 African Judo Championships in Tunis, Tunisia, losing out to Algeria's Soraya Haddad in the final match. At age twenty-six, Ouelogo made her official debut for the 2004 Summer Olympics in Athens, where she was defeated by former silver medalist Lyubov Bruletova in the first preliminary match of the women's 48 kg class.

At the 2008 Summer Olympics in Beijing, Ouelogo competed for the second time in the women's extra-lightweight class (48 kg). She lost again the first preliminary match this time, to Kazakhstan's Kelbet Nurgazina, who automatically scored an ippon to end the game at one minute and ten seconds.
