= Nonilobal Hien =

Burkinabé judoka

Personal information
- Born: 15 July 1964 (age 62)

Sport
- Sport: Judo

Nonilobal Hien (born 15 July 1964) is a Burkinabé judoka who competed at the 1992 Summer Olympics.

Hien competed in the extra-lightweight contest at the 1992 Summer Olympics, but he lost in the first round against Bosolo Mobando from Zaire after 1 minute and 34 seconds.
