= Piotr Kamrowski =

Polish judoka

Personal information
- Nationality: Polish
- Born: 10 September 1967 (age 57); Tychy, Poland

Sport
- Sport: Judo

Piotr Kamrowski (born 10 September 1967) is a Polish judoka. He competed at the 1992 Summer Olympics and the 1996 Summer Olympics.
