= Sarah Tondé =

Burkinabé sprinter

Personal information
- Born: 30 October 1983 (age 41)

Sport
- Country: Burkina Faso
- Event: Women's 100 metres

Achievements and titles
- Olympic finals: 2000

Sarah Tondé (born 30 October 1983) is a Burkinabé track and field athlete who specializes in the women's 100 metres and women's 200 metres events. She competed at the 2000 Summer Olympics in the Women's 100 metres event at the age of 16, where she finished in 8th place at 12.56 seconds. She was also the flag bearer of Burkina Faso during the 2000 Summer Olympics opening ceremony.

Sarah currently holds the Burkinabé record for the Women's 100 metres and 200 metres event at 11.56 seconds and 23.34 seconds respectively. In 2002, Sarah received further athletics training in the Sambre et Meuse Athlétique Club in Namur, Belgium.

Olympic Games
Preceded by Franck Zio	Flagbearer for Burkina Faso; 2000 Sydney	Succeeded by Mamadou Ouedraogo
