= Glenda Miranda =

Ecuadorian judoka (born 1985)

Medal record

Women's judo

Representing Ecuador

Pan American Championships
Bronze medal – third place	2007 Montreal	–48 kg
Bronze medal – third place	2009 Buenos Aires	–52 kg

Glenda Cecilia Miranda-Alvarado (born December 6, 1985, in Babahoyo, Los Ríos) is a judoka from Ecuador.

== Bio ==
Miranda was born in Babahoyo and began practicing judo at the age of seven. She lives and trains in Guayaquil, the largest city in Ecuador.

Her favorite food is fish.

She is a close friend of fellow Ecuadorian judoka and Olympian Carmen Chalá, whom she has cited as a sporting influence.

== Judo ==
Miranda used to compete for many years in extra half-lightweight category where she gained participation at 2008 Olympic Games in Beijing for very good results from continental championships. In Beijing she fought two matches and lost both of them but it had to be great experience for her.

After Olympic games she moved to half-lightweight category where is still waiting for a good result and some winning lead.

== Achievements ==
Year	Tournament	Place	Weight class
2008	Olympic Games	13th	Extra Half-Lightweight (- 48 kg)
2009	Pan American Judo Championships	3rd	Half-Lightweight (- 52 kg)
2010	South American Games	5th	Half-Lightweight (- 52 kg)
