= Rachid Sidibé =

Burkinabe judoka

Rachid Sidibé (born 2 December 1990) is a Burkinabé judoka. He competed at the 2016 Summer Olympics in the men's +100 kg event, in which he was eliminated in the first round by Iakiv Khammo. He was the flag bearer for Burkina Faso at the Parade of Nations.

Olympic Games
Preceded by Séverine Nébié	Flagbearer for Burkina Faso; 2016 Rio de Janeiro	Succeeded by Hugues Fabrice Zango; Angelika Ouedraogo
