= Cristina Curto =

Spanish judoka

Personal information
- Nationality: Spanish
- Born: 21 June 1969 (age 55); Barcelona, Spain

Sport
- Sport: Judo

Cristina Curto (born 21 June 1969) is a Spanish judoka. She competed at the 1992 Summer Olympics and the 1996 Summer Olympics.
