= Judo at the 1992 Summer Olympics =

Judo Judo at the Games of the XXV Olympiad
- Venue: Palau Blaugrana
- Location: Barcelona, Catalonia, Spain
- Dates: 27 July – 2 August 1992
- Competitors: 433 from 93 nations

Competition at external databases
- Links: IJF • JudoInside

The Judo competition at the 1992 Summer Olympics was contested in fourteen weight classes, seven each for men and women. The seven men's weight classes continued to be those first used in 1980. This was the first Olympic competition to award medals to women judoka; women competed in 1988 when women's judo was a demonstration sport.

== Medal summary ==
=== Men's events ===
Games	Gold	Silver	Bronze
60 kg	Nazim Huseynov; Unified Team (Azerbaijan)	Yoon Hyun; South Korea	Tadanori Koshino; Japan Richard Trautmann; Germany
65 kg	Rogério Sampaio; Brazil	József Csák; Hungary	Israel Hernández; Cuba Udo Quellmalz; Germany
71 kg	Toshihiko Koga; Japan	Bertalan Hajtós; Hungary	Chung Hoon; South Korea Oren Smadja; Israel
78 kg	Hidehiko Yoshida; Japan	Jason Morris; United States	Bertrand Damaisin; France Kim Byung-joo; South Korea
86 kg	Waldemar Legień; Poland	Pascal Tayot; France	Nicolas Gill; Canada Hirotaka Okada; Japan
95 kg	Antal Kovács; Hungary	Raymond Stevens; Great Britain	Theo Meijer; Netherlands Dmitri Sergeyev; Unified Team (Russia)
+95 kg	David Khakhaleishvili; Unified Team (Georgia)	Naoya Ogawa; Japan	Imre Csősz; Hungary David Douillet; France

=== Women's events ===
Games	Gold	Silver	Bronze
48 kg	Cécile Nowak; France	Ryoko Tamura; Japan	Amarilis Savón; Cuba Hülya Şenyurt; Turkey
52 kg	Almudena Muñoz; Spain	Noriko Mizoguchi; Japan	Li Zhongyun; China Sharon Rendle; Great Britain
56 kg	Miriam Blasco; Spain	Nicola Fairbrother; Great Britain	Driulis González; Cuba Chiyori Tateno; Japan
61 kg	Cathérine Fleury; France	Yael Arad; Israel	Yelena Petrova; Unified Team (Russia) Zhang Di; China
66 kg	Odalis Revé; Cuba	Emanuela Pierantozzi; Italy	Kate Howey; Great Britain Heidi Rakels; Belgium
72 kg	Kim Mi-jung; South Korea	Yoko Tanabe; Japan	Irene de Kok; Netherlands Laetitia Meignan; France
+72 kg	Zhuang Xiaoyan; China	Estela Rodríguez; Cuba	Natalia Lupino; France Yoko Sakaue; Japan

== Participating nations ==
- Algeria (3)
- Andorra (1)
- Angola (4)
- Argentina (9)
- Australia (2)
- Austria (6)
- Belgium (9)
- Bolivia (2)
- Bosnia and Herzegovina (1)
- Brazil (14)
- Bulgaria (5)
- Burkina Faso (1)
- Canada (12)
- Central African Republic (3)
- Chad (2)
- China (10)
- Chinese Taipei (2)
- Cuba (12)
- Cyprus (2)
- Czechoslovakia (5)
- Zaire (6)
- Djibouti (2)
- Dominican Republic (4)
- Ecuador (1)
- Egypt (3)
- El Salvador (1)
- Estonia (1)
- Fiji (4)
- Finland (7)
- France (14)
- Gabon (2)
- Germany (13)
- Great Britain (14)
- Greece (2)
- Guam (2)
- Guinea (3)
- Haiti (5)
- Hong Kong (4)
- Hungary (12)
- Iceland (3)
- Independent Olympic Athletes (4)
- India (5)
- Indonesia (4)
- Ireland (2)
- Israel (4)
- Italy (9)
- Ivory Coast (2)
- Japan (14)
- Kenya (3)
- Kuwait (2)
- Latvia (2)
- Lebanon (4)
- Libya (2)
- Liechtenstein (2)
- Lithuania (1)
- Luxembourg (1)
- Madagascar (2)
- Mali (2)
- Malta (2)
- Mexico (1)
- Mongolia (10)
- Myanmar (1)
- Netherlands (10)
- New Zealand (4)
- Nigeria (2)
- North Korea (3)
- Norway (1)
- Paraguay (1)
- Philippines (2)
- Poland (10)
- Portugal (8)
- Puerto Rico (4)
- Romania (6)
- San Marino (1)
- Senegal (6)
- Singapore (1)
- Slovenia (2)
- South Korea (14)
- Spain (12)
- Sudan (2)
- Sweden (6)
- Switzerland (5)
- Thailand (2)
- Tunisia (1)
- Turkey (4)
- Unified Team (13)
- United States (13)
- Uruguay (1)
- Venezuela (3)
- Yemen (5)
- Zambia (1)
- Zimbabwe (2)

== Medal table ==
Rank	Nation	Gold	Silver	Bronze	Total
1	Japan	2	4	4	10
2	France	2	1	4	7
3	Unified Team	2	0	2	4
4	Spain	2	0	0	2
5	Hungary	1	2	1	4
6	Cuba	1	1	3	5
7	South Korea	1	1	2	4
8	China	1	0	2	3
9	Brazil	1	0	0	1
9	Poland	1	0	0	1
11	Great Britain	0	2	2	4
12	Israel	0	1	1	2
13	Italy	0	1	0	1
13	United States	0	1	0	1
15	Germany	0	0	2	2
15	Netherlands	0	0	2	2
17	Belgium	0	0	1	1
17	Canada	0	0	1	1
17	Turkey	0	0	1	1
Totals (19 entries)		14	14	28	56
