= Estha Essombe =

French judoka

Estha Essombe (born 20 April 1963 in Boulogne-sur-Mer, France) is a French judoka. Essombe competed at the 1996 Summer Olympics in the women's half-heavyweight division.
