= Bosolo Mobando =

Congolese judoka

Personal information
- Nationality: Congolese
- Born: 12 March 1973 (age 52)
- Occupation: Judoka

Sport
- Sport: Judo

Bosolo Mobando (born 12 March 1973) is a Congolese judoka. He competed in the men's extra-lightweight event at the 1992 Summer Olympics.
