= Franck Zio =

Burkinabé long jumper

Personal information
- Born: 14 August 1971 (age 55) Ouagadougou, Burkina Faso

Sport
- Sport: Track and field

Franck Olivier Zio (born 14 August 1971) is a retired Burkinabé long jumper. His personal best jump was 8.00 m (26 ft 2 3/4 in), achieved in June 1998 in Viry-Châtillon. This is the current Burkinabé record.

== Competition record ==
Year	Competition	Venue	Position	Event	Notes
Representing Burkina Faso
1988	World Junior Championships	Sudbury, Canada	37th (q)	Long jump	5.80 m (+0.5 m/s)
1990	World Junior Championships	Plovdiv, Bulgaria	48th (h)	100m	11.11 (+2.0 m/s)
1990	World Junior Championships	Plovdiv, Bulgaria	40th (h)	200m	22.66 (+0.5 m/s)
1990	World Junior Championships	Plovdiv, Bulgaria	25th (q)	Long jump	6.94 m (+0.6 m/s)
1991	Universiade	Sheffield, United Kingdom	29th (qf)	100 m	10.68
1991	Universiade	Sheffield, United Kingdom	27th (q)	Long jump	7.10 m
1991	World Championships	Tokyo, Japan	58th (h)	100 m	10.93 s
1991	World Championships	Tokyo, Japan	35th (q)	Long jump	7.50 m
1992	Olympic Games	Barcelona, Spain	24th (q)	Long jump	7.70 m
1993	Universiade	Buffalo, United States	6th	Long jump	7.74 m
1993	World Championships	Stuttgart, Germany	35th (q)	Long jump	7.42 m
1994	Jeux de la Francophonie	Paris, France	3rd	Long jump	7.75 m
1995	World Championships	Gothenburg, Sweden	10th	Long jump	7.87 m
1995	Universiade	Fukuoka, Japan	22nd (q)	Long jump	7.63 m
1996	Olympic Games	Atlanta, United States	–	Long jump	NM
1997	World Indoor Championships	Paris, France	25th (q)	Long jump	7.49 m
1997	Jeux de la Francophonie	Antananarivo, Madagascar	2nd	Long jump	8.02 m (w)
1999	All-Africa Games	Johannesburg, South Africa	5th	Long jump	7.64 m^{1}

^{1}No mark in the final

Olympic Games
Preceded by Sounaila Sagnon	Flagbearer for Burkina Faso; 1992 Barcelona; 1996 Atlanta	Succeeded by Sarah Tondé
