= Kelbet Nurgazina =

Kazakhstani judoka

Medal record

Representing Kazakhstan

Women's Judo

Asian Games
Bronze medal – third place	2006 Doha	-48 kg

Kelbet Nurgazina (Келбет Мураловна Нургазина, born 8 July 1986) is a Kazakhstani judoka.

She won a bronze medal in the extra-lightweight (48 kg) category of the 2006 Asian Games, having defeated Gereltuya Erdenechimeg of Mongolia in the bronze medal match.

She currently resides in Karaganda.
