= Burkinabé National Olympic and Sports Committee =

National Olympic Committee

- Country: Burkina Faso
- Code: BUR
- Created: 10 June 1965
- Recognized: 1972
- Continental Association: ANOCA
- Headquarters: Ouagadougou
- President: Jean-Pascal Kinda
- Secretary General: Christian Yves Zongo

The Burkinabé National Olympic and Sports Committee (French: Comité National Olympique et des Sports Burkinabè) (IOC code: BUR) is the National Olympic Committee representing Burkina Faso. It was created on 10 June 1965 and recognized by the International Olympic Committee in February 1972.

== History ==
The committee was founded on 10 June 1965 as the Upper Volta National Olympic Committee (French: Comité National Olympique Voltaïque) and was recognised at the 72nd Session of the IOC at Sapporo, Japan in February 1972.

At the October 1982 meeting of the IOC Executive in Lausanne, Switzerland it was unanimously considered the fundamental rules of the Olympic Charter governing the activities and conduct of National Olympic Committees to have been transgressed in Upper Volta. The executive decided to provisionally suspend the Committee. At the 86th Session of the IOC at New Delhi, India in 1983, the suspension was lifted.

In 1984, with the change of the nation's name to Burkina Faso, the committee changed its name to the Burkinabé National Olympic and Sports Council (French: Conseil National Olympique et des Sports Burkinabè).

== Former Presidents ==
- Triandé Toumani (1965–1975)
- Felix Tientaraboum (1975–1978)
- Bobo Adrien Tabsoba (1978–????)
- Nacro Mahoma

== See also ==
- Burkina Faso at the Olympics
