= Judo at the 1996 Summer Olympics – Men's +95 kg =

Judo competition

Men's 95kg at the Games of the XXVI Olympiad
- Venue: Georgia World Congress Center
- Date: 20 July 1996
- Competitors: 32 from 32 nations

Medalists
1st place, gold medalist(s)		David Douillet	France
2nd place, silver medalist(s)		Ernesto Pérez	Spain
3rd place, bronze medalist(s)		Frank Möller	Germany
3rd place, bronze medalist(s)		Harry Van Barneveld	Belgium

These are the results of the Men's +95 kg (also known as Heavyweight) competition in judo at the 1996 Summer Olympics in Atlanta, Georgia. A total of 32 men competed in this event, limited to jūdōka whose body weight was more than 95 kilograms. Competition took place in the Georgia World Congress Center.

The gold and silver medals were determined by a single-elimination tournament, with the winner of the final taking gold and the loser receiving silver. Judo events awarded two bronze medals. Quarterfinal losers competed in a repechage match for the right to face a semifinal loser for a bronze medal (that is, the judokas defeated in quarterfinals A and B competed against each other, with the winner of that match facing the semifinal loser from the other half of the bracket).

== Tournament results ==
=== First round ===
As there were more than 32 qualifiers for the tournament, two first round matches were held to reduce the field to 32 judoka.

- Harry Van Barneveld (BEL) defeated Frank Estaban Moreno Garcia (CUB)
- Alexandru Lungu (ROM) defeated David Khakhaleishvili (GEO)

=== Main bracket ===
The gold and silver medalists were determined by the final match of the main single-elimination bracket.

1st Round
Damon Keeve (USA)	L
Ruslan Sharapov (BLR)	W
Rafal Kubacki (POL)	W
Indrek Pertelson (EST)	L
Naoya Ogawa (JPN)	W
Arnulfo Betancourt (NCA)	L
Kharis Papaioannou (GRE)	W
Miklós Szabó (AUS)	L
Kamol Muradov (UZB)	L
Igor Mueller (LUX)	W
David Douillet (FRA)	W
Harry Van Barneveld (BEL)	L
Saidahtam Rahimov (TJK)	W
Orlando Baccino (ARG)	L
Eric Krieger (AUT)	W
Kamel Larbi (ALG)	L
Ernesto Pérez (ESP)	W
Selim Tataroglu (TUR)	L
Frank Möller (GER)	W
Denny Ebbers (NED)	L
Slim Agrebi (TUN)	L
Igor Peshkov (KAZ)	W
Dmitar Milinkovic (SCG)	L
Imre Csösz (HUN)	W
Pitak Kampita (THA)	L
Frederico Flexa (BRA)	W
José Augusto Geraldino (DOM)	L
Serguei Kossorotov (RUS)	W
Khalifa Diouf (SEN)	L
Vadim Sergeyev (KGZ)	W
Alexandru Lungu (ROU)	L
Liu Shenggang (CHN)	W

2nd Round
Ruslan Sharapov (BLR)	L
Rafal Kubacki (POL)	W
Naoya Ogawa (JPN)	W
Charalambos Papaioannou (GRE)	L
Igor Mueller (LUX)	L
David Douillet (FRA)	W
Saidakhtam Rakhimov (TJK)	L
Eric Krieger (AUT)	W
Ernesto Pérez (ESP)	W
Frank Möller (GER)	L
Igor Peshkov (KAZ)	L
Imre Csösz (HUN)	W
Frederico Flexa (BRA)	L
Sergey Kosorotov (RUS)	W
Vadim Sergeev (KGZ)	L
Liu Shenggang (CHN)	W

Quarterfinals
Rafal Kubacki (POL)	L
Naoya Ogawa (JPN)	W
David Douillet (FRA)	W
Eric Krieger (AUT)	L
Ernesto Pérez (ESP)	W
Imre Csösz (HUN)	L
Sergey Kosorotov (RUS)	L
Liu Shenggang (CHN)	W

Semifinals
Naoya Ogawa (JPN)	L
David Douillet (FRA)	W
Ernesto Pérez (ESP)	W
Liu Shenggang (CHN)	L

Gold medal final
David Douillet (FRA)	W
Ernesto Pérez (ESP)	L

=== Repechage ===
The losing semifinalists as well as those judoka eliminated in earlier rounds by the four semifinalists of the main bracket advanced to the repechage. These matches determined the two bronze medalists for the event.

First round
Harris Papaioannou (GRE)	W
Arnulfo Betanco Galeano (NCA)	L
Harry Van Barneveld (BEL)	W
Igor Mueller (LUX)	L
Selim Tataroglu (TUR)	L
Frank Möller (GER)	W
Vadim Sergeev (KGZ)	L
Alexandru Lungu (ROU)	W

Second round
Rafal Kubacki (POL)	L
Harris Papaioannou (GRE)	W
Eric Krieger (AUT)	L
Harry Van Barneveld (BEL)	W
Imre Csösz (HUN)	L
Frank Möller (GER)	W
Serguei Kossorotov (RUS)	W
Alexandru Lungu (ROU)	L

Third round
Harris Papaioannou (GRE)	L
Harry Van Barneveld (BEL)	W
Frank Möller (GER)	W
Serguei Kossorotov (RUS)	L

Bronze medal finals
Liu Shenggang (CHN)	L
Harry Van Barneveld (BEL)	W
Naoya Ogawa (JPN)	L
Frank Möller (GER)	W
