= Judo at the 1992 Summer Olympics – Men's +95 kg =

Judo at the Olympics

Men's +95 kg at the Games of the XXV Olympiad
- Venue: Palau Blaugrana
- Date: 27 July 1992
- Competitors: 28 from 28 nations

Medalists
1st place, gold medalist(s)		David Khakhaleishvili	Unified Team
2nd place, silver medalist(s)		Naoya Ogawa	Japan
3rd place, bronze medalist(s)		Imre Csősz	Hungary
3rd place, bronze medalist(s)		David Douillet	France

The men's +95 kg competition in judo at the 1992 Summer Olympics in Barcelona was held on 27 July at the Palau Blaugrana. The gold medal was won by David Khakhaleishvili of the Unified Team.

== Results ==
=== Main brackets ===
==== Pool A ====
Round of 32
David Khakhaleishvili (EUN)	IPO
Khalif Diouf (SEN)	RA
Frank Moreno (CUB)	WIP
Sigurður Bergmann (ISL)	E
Rafal Kubacki (POL)	IPO
Orlando Baccino (ARG)	E
Juha Salonen (FIN)	E
Dennis Raven (NED)	IPO
Stefano Venturelli (ITA)	IPO
Ho Yen Chye (SIN)	E
Damon Keeve (USA)	RA
Imre Csősz (HUN)	KEI
Damyan Stoykov (BUL)	IPO
José Mario Tranquillini (BRA)	E
Badmaanyambuugiin Bat-Erdene (MGL)	W
Mitar Milinković (IOA)	E

Round of 16
David Khakhaleishvili (EUN)	WAZ
Frank Moreno (CUB)	RA
Rafal Kubacki (POL)	IPO
Dennis Raven (NED)	E
Stefano Venturelli (ITA)	RA
Imre Csősz (HUN)	IPO
Damyan Stoykov (BUL)	YUK
Badmaanyambuugiin Bat-Erdene (MGL)	E

Quarterfinal
David Khakhaleishvili (EUN)	KOK
Rafal Kubacki (POL)	RA
Imre Csősz (HUN)	SOG
Damyan Stoykov (BUL)	RA

Semifinal
David Khakhaleishvili (EUN)	WAZ
Imre Csősz (HUN)	RB

==== Pool B ====
Round of 32
Elvis Gordon (GBR)	RB
David Douillet (FRA)	IPO
Valentin Bazon (ROU)	E
Kim Geon-su (KOR)	IPO
Ernesto Pérez (ESP)	W
Cawas Billimoria (IND)	E
M. Al Aoua (SYR)	DNS
Harry Van Barneveld (BEL)	WO
Naoya Ogawa (JPN)	HAN
Atif Muhammad Hussain (GUM)	RB

Round of 16
Henry Stöhr (GER)	RB
David Douillet (FRA)	HAN
Kim Geon-su (KOR)	E
Ernesto Pérez (ESP)	WAZ
Igor Muller (LUX)	E
Harry Van Barneveld (BEL)	IPO
Naoya Ogawa (JPN)	IPO
Donald Obwoge (KEN)	RB

Quarterfinal
David Douillet (FRA)	WIP
Ernesto Pérez (ESP)	RB
Harry Van Barneveld (BEL)	RB
Naoya Ogawa (JPN)	IPO

Semifinal
David Douillet (FRA)	RA
Naoya Ogawa (JPN)	WIP

=== Repechages ===
==== Repechage A ====
Repechage round 1
Khalif Diouf (SEN)	E
Frank Moreno (CUB)	IPO
Damon Keeve (USA)	IPO
Stefano Venturelli (ITA)	E

Repechage quarterfinal
Frank Moreno (CUB)	IPO
Rafal Kubacki (POL)	E
Damon Keeve (USA)	YUK
Damyan Stoykov (BUL)	E

Repechage semifinal
Frank Moreno (CUB)	IPO
Damon Keeve (USA)	E

Repechage final
Frank Moreno (CUB)	E
David Douillet (FRA)	YUK (bronze)

==== Repechage B ====
Repechage round 1
Elvis Gordon (GBR)	IPO
Henry Stöhr (GER)	E
Atif Muhammad Hussain (GUM)	E
Donald Obwoge (KEN)	FUS

Repechage quarterfinal
Elvis Gordon (GBR)	E
Ernesto Pérez (ESP)	WAZ
Donald Obwoge (KEN)	E
Harry Van Barneveld (BEL)	IPO

Repechage semifinal
Ernesto Pérez (ESP)	E
Harry Van Barneveld (BEL)	IPO

Repechage final
Harry Van Barneveld (BEL)	E
Imre Csősz (HUN)	WAZ (bronze)

=== Final ===
Final
David Khakhaleishvili (EUN)	WIP (gold)
Naoya Ogawa (JPN)	2nd place, silver medalist(s)

== Final classification ==
Rank	Judoka	Nation
1st place, gold medalist(s)	David Khakhaleishvili	Unified Team
2nd place, silver medalist(s)	Naoya Ogawa	Japan
3rd place, bronze medalist(s)	Imre Csősz	Hungary
3rd place, bronze medalist(s)	David Douillet	France
5T	Frank Moreno	Cuba
5T	Harry Van Barneveld	Belgium
7T	Damon Keeve	United States
7T	Ernesto Pérez	Spain
9T	Rafal Kubacki	Poland
9T	Damyan Stoykov	Bulgaria
9T	Elvis Gordon	Great Britain
9T	Donald Obwoge	Kenya
13T	Khalif Diouf	Senegal
13T	Stefano Venturelli	Italy
13T	Henry Stöhr	Germany
13T	Atif Muhammad Hussain	Guam
17T	Badmaanyambuugiin Bat-Erdene	Mongolia
17T	Dennis Raven	Netherlands
17T	Kim Geon-su	South Korea
17T	Igor Muller	Luxembourg
21T	Sigurður Bergmann	Iceland
21T	Orlando Baccino	Argentina
21T	Juha Salonen	Finland
21T	Ho Yen Chye	Singapore
21T	José Mario Tranquillini	Brazil
21T	Mitar Milinković	Independent Olympic Participants
21T	Valentin Bazon	Romania
21T	Cawas Billimoria	India
