= Netherlands at the 2004 Summer Olympics =

- Flag of the Netherlands
- IOC code: NED
- NOC: Dutch Olympic Committee*; Dutch Sports Federation
- Website: www.nocnsf.nl (in Dutch)

in Athens
- Competitors: 210 in 20 sports
- Flag bearers: Mark Huizinga (opening); Leontien van Moorsel (closing)
- Medals Ranked 18th: Gold 4 Silver 9 Bronze 9 Total 22

Summer Olympics appearances (overview)
- 1900; 1904; 1908; 1912; 1920; 1924; 1928; 1932; 1936; 1948; 1952; 1956; 1960; 1964; 1968; 1972; 1976; 1980; 1984; 1988; 1992; 1996; 2000; 2004; 2008; 2012; 2016; 2020; 2024; 2028

Other related appearances
- 1906 Intercalated Games

The Netherlands competed at the 2004 Summer Olympics in Athens, Greece, from 13 to 29 August 2004. Dutch athletes have competed in every Summer Olympic Games since its official debut in 1908. Netherlands, however, boycotted the 1956 Summer Olympics in Melbourne, because of the Soviet invasion of Hungary. The Netherlands National Olympic Committee (Dutch: Nederlands Olympisch Comité * Nederlandse Sport Federatie, NOC*NSF) sent a total of 210 athletes to the Games, 134 men and 76 women, to compete in 21 sports. Baseball, field hockey, and men's volleyball were the only team-based sports in which the Netherlands had its representation at these Games. There was only a single competitor in women's fencing.

The Dutch team featured five defending Olympic champions: swimming stars Pieter van den Hoogenband and Inge de Bruijn, road and track cyclist Leontien van Moorsel, dressage rider Anky van Grunsven along with her horse Bonfire, and middleweight judoka Mark Huizinga, who later became the Netherlands' flag bearer in the opening ceremony. Star sailor Mark Neeleman, at age 45, became the first Dutch male athlete to compete in six Olympic Games since 1980 (except the 1988 Summer Olympics, in which he was selected). Shooter Hennie Dompeling sought his fifth Olympic bid as one of the most sophisticated members of the team, having missed the medal podium in the men's skeet from Sydney four years earlier. Among the Dutch athletes of the team, several of them were born outside the Netherlands and became naturalized citizens, including sprinter Troy Douglas, who competed for three Olympics under the Bermudian flag, badminton players Mia Audina from Indonesia and Jie Yao from China, and taekwondo jin Charmie Sobers from the Netherlands Antilles.

Netherlands left Athens with a total of 22 Olympic medals, 4 golds, 9 silver, and 9 bronze, failing to achieve three medals short of the record from Sydney. Four Olympic champions managed to defend their titles from the previous Games in their respective events, while van den Hoogenband, de Bruijn, and van Moorsel still emerged as the most decorated Dutch athletes at these Games for the second time with more than a single medal. Seven of these medals were awarded to the athletes in swimming, including two from the freestyle relay teams; four each in cycling and judo, and three in rowing. Netherlands' team-based athletes proved particularly successful in Athens, as the men's and women's field hockey teams took home silver medals.

== Medalists ==
Medal	Name	Sport	Event	Date
Gold	Leontien van Moorsel	Cycling	Women's road time trial	August 18
Gold	Pieter van den Hoogenband	Swimming	Men's 100 m freestyle	August 18
Gold	Inge de Bruijn	Swimming	Women's 50 m freestyle	August 21
Gold	Anky van Grunsven	Equestrian	Individual dressage	August 25
Silver	Johan Kenkhuis; Pieter van den Hoogenband; Mark Veens*; Mitja Zastrow; Klaas-Erik Zwering	Swimming	Men's 4 × 100 m freestyle relay	August 15
Silver	Pieter van den Hoogenband	Swimming	Men's 200 m freestyle	August 16
Silver	Edith Bosch	Judo	Women's 70 kg	August 18
Silver	Inge de Bruijn	Swimming	Women's 100 m freestyle	August 19
Silver	Mia Audina	Badminton	Women's singles	August 19
Silver	Michiel Bartman; Chun Wei Cheung (cox); Geert-Jan Derksen; Gerritjan Eggenkamp; Jan-Willem Gabriëls; Daniël Mensch; Diederik Simon; Matthijs Vellenga; Gijs Vermeulen	Rowing	Men's eight	August 22
Silver	Theo Bos	Cycling	Men's sprint	August 24
Silver	Netherlands women's national field hockey team: Minke Booij; Ageeth Boomgaardt; Chantal de Bruijn; Lisanne de Roever; Mijntje Donners; Sylvia Karres; Fatima Moreira de Melo; Eefke Mulder; Maartje Scheepstra; Janneke Schopman; Clarinda Sinnige; Minke Smabers; Jiske Snoeks; Macha van der Vaart; Miek van Geenhuizen; Lieve van Kessel	Field hockey	Women's tournament	August 26
Silver	Netherlands men's national field hockey team: Matthijs Brouwer; Ronald Brouwer; Jeroen Delmee; Geert-Jan Derikx; Rob Derikx; Marten Eikelboom; Floris Evers; Erik Jazet; Karel Klaver; Jesse Mahieu; Teun de Nooijer; Rob Reckers; Taeke Taekema; Klaas Veering; Guus Vogels; Sander van der Weide	Field hockey	Men's tournament	August 27
Bronze	Inge de Bruijn; Inge Dekker; Chantal Groot; Annabel Kosten*; Marleen Veldhuis	Swimming	Women's 4 × 100 m freestyle relay	August 14
Bronze	Inge de Bruijn	Swimming	Women's 100 m butterfly	August 15
Bronze	Deborah Gravenstijn	Judo	Women's 57 kg	August 16
Bronze	Mark Huizinga	Judo	Men's 90 kg	August 18
Bronze	Dennis van der Geest	Judo	Men's +100 kg	August 20
Bronze	Leontien van Moorsel	Cycling	Women's individual pursuit	August 22
Bronze	Kirsten van der Kolk; Marit van Eupen	Rowing	Women's lightweight double sculls	August 22
Bronze	Annemiek de Haan; Hurnet Dekkers; Nienke Hommes; Sarah Siegelaar; Marlies Smulders; Helen Tanger; Annemarieke van Rumpt; Froukje Wegman; Ester Workel (cox)	Rowing	Women's eight	August 22
Bronze	Bart Brentjens	Cycling	Men's cross-country	August 28

Medals by sport
Sport	1st place, gold medalist(s)	2nd place, silver medalist(s)	3rd place, bronze medalist(s)	Total
Swimming	2	3	2	7
Cycling	1	1	2	4
Equestrian	1	0	0	1
Field hockey	0	2	0	2
Judo	0	1	3	4
Rowing	0	1	2	3
Badminton	0	1	0	1
Total	4	9	9	22

== Archery ==
Three Dutch archers qualified each for the men's individual archery, and a spot for the men's team.

Athlete	Event	Ranking round		Round of 64	Round of 32	Round of 16	Quarterfinals	Semifinals	Final / BM	
Athlete	Event	Score	Seed	Opposition Score	Opposition Score	Opposition Score	Opposition Score	Opposition Score	Opposition Score	Rank
Pieter Custers	Men's individual	646	36	Zabrodskiy (KAZ); L 141–145	Did not advance					
Wietse van Alten	Men's individual	661	14	Merlos (ESA); W 152–151	di Buò (ITA); L 160–164	Did not advance				
Ron van der Hoff	Men's individual	633	49	Johnson (USA); W 145–135	Prasad (IND); L 155–158	Did not advance				
Pieter Custers; Wietse van Alten; Ron van der Hoff	Men's team	1940	9	—N/a		Mexico; W 244–234	South Korea; L 249–250	Did not advance		

== Athletics ==
Dutch athletes have so far achieved qualifying standards in the following athletics events (up to a maximum of 3 athletes in each event at the 'A' Standard, and 1 at the 'B' Standard).

Key

- Note–Ranks given for track events are within the athlete's heat only
- Q = Qualified for the next round
- q = Qualified for the next round as a fastest loser or, in field events, by position without achieving the qualifying target
- NR = National record
- N/A = Round not applicable for the event
- Bye = Athlete not required to compete in round

Men
Track & road events

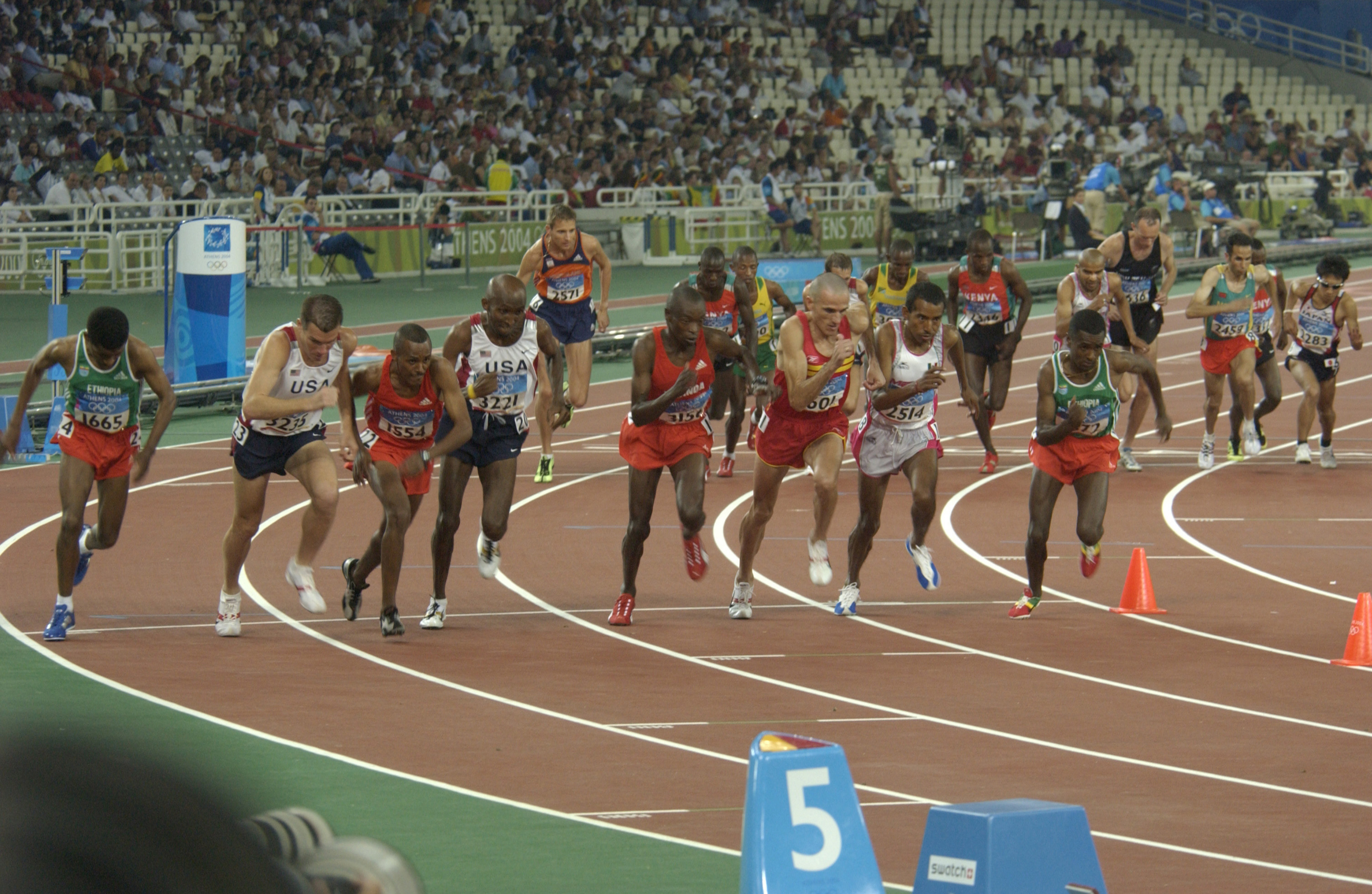
Kamiel Maase (centre in orange) during the 10000 m

Athlete	Event	Heat		Quarterfinal		Semifinal		Final	
Athlete	Event	Result	Rank	Result	Rank	Result	Rank	Result	Rank
Luc Krotwaar	Marathon	—N/a						DNS	
Gert-Jan Liefers	1500 m	3:40.10	6 q	—N/a		3:36.00	3 Q	3:37.17	8
Kamiel Maase	10000 m	—N/a						28:23.29	14
Gregory Sedoc	110 m hurdles	13.65	5 q	DNF		Did not advance			
Bram Som	800 m	1:45.72	5 q	—N/a		1:45.52	5	Did not advance	
Simon Vroemen	3000 m steeplechase	8:15.28	2 Q	—N/a				8:13.25	6
Timothy Beck; Caimin Douglas; Troy Douglas; Patrick van Balkom	4 × 100 m relay	DNF		—N/a				Did not advance	

Field events

Athlete	Event	Qualification		Final	
Athlete	Event	Distance	Position	Distance	Position
Rens Blom	Pole vault	5.70	=7 Q	5.65	9
Rutger Smith	Shot put	19.69	17	Did not advance	
Rutger Smith	Discus throw	61.11	16	Did not advance	

Combined events – Decathlon

Athlete	Event	100 m	LJ	SP	HJ	400 m	110H	DT	PV	JT	1500 m	Final	Rank
Eugène Martineau	Result	10.99	6.84	NM	2.00	49.10	15.02	40.00	4.80	63.62	4:31.79	7185	29
Eugène Martineau	Points	863	776	0	803	857	847	665	849	792	733	7185	29
Chiel Warners	Result	10.62	7.74	14.58	1.97	47.97	14.01	43.73	4.90	55.39	4:38.05	8343	5
Chiel Warners	Points	947	995	758	776	911	973	741	880	669	693	8343	5

Women
Track & road events

Athlete	Event	Heat		Final	
Athlete	Event	Result	Rank	Result	Rank
Lornah Kiplagat	10000 m	—N/a		30:31.92	5
Annemarie Kramer; Jacqueline Poelman; Pascal van Assendelft; Joan van den Akker	4 × 100 m relay	DNF		Did not advance	

Field events

Athlete	Event	Qualification		Final	
Athlete	Event	Distance	Position	Distance	Position
Lieja Tunks	Shot put	18.38	9 q	18.14	11

Combined events – Heptathlon

Athlete	Event	100H	HJ	SP	200 m	LJ	JT	800 m	Final	Rank
Karin Ruckstuhl	Result	13.44	1.85	13.37	24.59	5.90	36.70	2:13.95	6108	16
Karin Ruckstuhl	Points	1059	1041	752	925	819	604	908	6108	16

== Badminton ==
Athlete	Event	Round of 32	Round of 16	Quarterfinal	Semifinal	Final / BM	
Athlete	Event	Opposition Score	Opposition Score	Opposition Score	Opposition Score	Opposition Score	Rank
Mia Audina	Women's singles	Saunders (JAM); W 11–4, 11–1	Popat (IND); W 9–11, 11–1, 11–3	Hallam (GBR); W 11–0, 11–9	Gong Rn (CHN); W 11–4, 11–2	Zhang N (CHN); L 11–8, 6–11, 7–11	2nd place, silver medalist(s)
Jie Yao	Women's singles	Jiang Ym (SIN); W 11–6, 11–8	Wang C (HKG); L 11–8, 10–13, 8–11	Did not advance			
Mia Audina; Lotte Bruil	Women's doubles	Bye	Tripp / Wright (GBR); W 15–7, 15–7	Lee K-W / Ra K-M (KOR); L 2–15, 2–15	Did not advance		
Chris Bruil; Lotte Bruil	Mixed doubles	Bye	Kim D-M / Ra K-M (KOR); L 4–15, 6–15	Did not advance			

== Baseball ==
Roster

Manager: 6 – Robert Eenhoorn

Coaches: 17 – Eric de Bruin, 30 – Davey Johnson, 32 – Hensley Meulens

Pos.	No.	Player	Date of birth (age)	Bats	Throws	Club
IF	2	Yurendell de Caster	27 September 1979 (aged 24)			(United States) Altoona Curve
P	3	Robin van Doornspeek	25 February 1981 (aged 23)			(Netherlands) Minolta Pioniers
IF	4	Ivanon Coffie	16 May 1977 (aged 27)			(United States) Houston Astros
P	5	Ferenc Jongejan	20 October 1978 (aged 25)			(United States) Daytona Cubs
IF	7	Ralph Milliard	30 December 1973 (aged 30)			(Netherlands) Mr Cocker HCAW
IF	9	Evert-Jan 't Hoen	8 November 1975 (aged 28)			(Netherlands) DOOR Neptunus
IF	12	Sharnol Adriana	13 November 1970 (aged 33)			(Mexico) Córdoba
P	14	Dave Draijer	30 September 1973 (aged 30)			(Netherlands) Mr Cocker HCAW
C	15	Maikel Benner	24 March 1980 (aged 24)			(Netherlands) DOOR Neptunus
P	16	Patrick Beljaards	4 March 1978 (aged 26)			(Netherlands) DPA Kinheim
OF	18	Dirk van 't Klooster	23 April 1976 (aged 28)			(Netherlands) DOOR Neptunus
P	19	Rob Cordemans	31 October 1974 (aged 29)			(Netherlands) DOOR Neptunus
P	20	Eelco Jansen	14 May 1969 (aged 35)			(Netherlands) DOOR Neptunus
OF	21	Eugene Kingsale	20 August 1976 (aged 27)			(United States) San Diego Padres
P	22	Patrick de Lange	21 January 1976 (aged 28)			(Netherlands) Mr Cocker HCAW
OF	23	Johnny Balentina	8 August 1971 (aged 33)			(Netherlands) DPA Kinheim
C	24	Sidney de Jong	14 April 1979 (aged 25)			(Netherlands) Mr Cocker HCAW
OF	28	Harvey Monte	4 October 1981 (aged 22)			(Netherlands) DOOR Neptunus
IF	30	Raily Legito	26 July 1978 (aged 26)			(Netherlands) DOOR Neptunus
P	31	Alexander Smit	2 October 1985 (aged 18)			(United States) Elizabethton Twins
C	33	Chairon Isenia	23 January 1979 (aged 25)			(United States) Montgomery Biscuits
OF	34	Calvin Maduro	5 September 1974 (aged 29)			(Netherlands) Mr Cocker HCAW
P	35	Diego Markwell	8 August 1980 (aged 24)			(United States) New Haven Ravens
OF	37	Ramon Balentien	2 July 1984 (aged 20)			(United States) Seattle Mariners

Round robin

Team	W	L	Tiebreaker
Japan	6	1	1-0
Cuba	6	1	0-1
Canada	5	2	-
Australia	4	3	-
Chinese Taipei	3	4	-
Netherlands	2	5	-
Greece	1	6	1-0
Italy	1	6	0-1

Team	1	2	3	4	5	6	7	8	9	R	H	E
Netherlands	0	0	0	6	0	0	0	0	5	11	13	1
Greece	0	0	0	0	0	0	0	0	0	0	2	2
WP: Calvin Maduro (1-0) LP: Clinton Zavaras (0-1); Home runs: NED: Y. de Caster in 4th, 3 RBIs; R. Balentien in 9th, 2 RBIs; GRE: None

Team	1	2	3	4	5	6	7	8	9	R	H	E
Netherlands	1	2	0	0	0	0	0	0	0	3	4	1
Japan	1	1	0	0	2	0	0	4	x	8	11	1
WP: Hiroki Kuroda (1-0) LP: Diego Markwell (0-1); Home runs: NED: None; JPN: A. Fujimoto in 8th, 2 RBIs

Team	1	2	3	4	5	6	7	8	9	R	H	E
Canada	0	1	0	1	2	1	0	0	0	7	11	0
Netherlands	0	0	0	0	0	0	0	0	0	0	3	0
WP: Shawn Hill (1-0) LP: Patrick Beljaards (0-1); Home runs: CAN: P. Orr in 2nd, 3 RBIs; P. L. Laforest in 3rd, 1 RBI; R. Clapp in 4th, 1 RBI; NED: None

Team	1	2	3	4	5	6	7	8	9	R	H	E
Italy	0	1	0	1	2	1	0	0	0	4	8	1
Netherlands	2	0	1	0	0	3	2	2	x	10	14	1
WP: Patrick de Lange (1-0) LP: Kaseygarret Olenberger (0-1); Home runs: ITA: J. Ramos Gizzi in 4th, 1 RBI; NED: S. Adriana in 3rd, 1 RBI

Team	1	2	3	4	5	6	7	8	9	R	H	E
Netherlands	0	0	0	0	0	0	0	1	1	2	5	0
Cuba	0	0	5	0	4	0	0	0	x	9	12	0
WP: Adiel Palma (1-0) LP: Eelco Jansen (0-1); Home runs: NED: E. J. 'T Hoen in 8th, 1 RBI; Y. de Casterin 9th, 1 RBI; CUB: None

Team	1	2	3	4	5	6	7	R	H	E
Australia	9	5	5	1	0	2	0	22	17	2
Netherlands	0	1	0	0	1	0	0	2	4	1
WP: Craig Lewis (1-0) LP: Calvin Maduro (0-2); Home runs: AUS: B. Roneberg in 1st, 2 RBIs; R. van Buizen in 3rd, 4 RBIs; G. Fingleson in 2nd, 3 RBIs; G. Williams in 6th, 2 RBIs; NED: Y. de Caster in 2nd, 1 RBI; R. Millard in 5th, 1 RBI

Team	1	2	3	4	5	6	7	8	9	R	H	E
Chinese Taipei	0	1	0	1	0	1	2	0	0	5	9	1
Netherlands	0	0	0	1	0	0	0	0	0	1	1	6
WP: Pan Wei-lun (2-0) LP: Patrick de Lange (1-1); Home runs: TPE: None; NED: E. Kingsale in 4th, 1 RBI

== Canoeing ==
=== Slalom ===
Athlete	Event	Preliminary						Semifinal		Final			
Athlete	Event	Run 1	Rank	Run 2	Rank	Total	Rank	Time	Rank	Time	Rank	Total	Rank
Floris Braat	Men's K-1	97.96	10	97.18	9	195.14	11 Q	101.39	17	Did not advance			
Sam Oud	Men's K-1	107.27	22	95.41	3	202.68	20 Q	94.46	3 Q	102.82	9	197.28	8

== Cycling ==
=== Road ===
Men

Athlete	Event	Time	Rank
Michael Boogerd	Road race	Did not finish	
Erik Dekker	Road race	5:42:29	41
Thomas Dekker	Time trial	1:00:37.49	20
Servais Knaven	Road race	Did not finish	
Karsten Kroon	Road race	5:47:13	52
Max van Heeswijk	Road race	5:41:56	17

Women

Athlete	Event	Time	Rank
Mirjam Melchers	Road race	3:25:06	6
Mirjam Melchers	Time trial	33:01.58	13
Anouska van der Zee	Road race	Did not finish	
Leontien van Moorsel	Road race	Did not finish	
Leontien van Moorsel	Time trial	31:11.53	1st place, gold medalist(s)

=== Track ===
Sprint

Athlete	Event	Qualification		Round 1	Repechage 1	Round 2	Repechage 2	Quarterfinals	Semifinals	Final	
Athlete	Event	Time Speed (km/h)	Rank	Opposition Time Speed (km/h)	Opposition Time Speed (km/h)	Opposition Time Speed (km/h)	Opposition Time Speed (km/h)	Opposition Time Speed (km/h)	Opposition Time Speed (km/h)	Opposition Time Speed (km/h)	Rank
Theo Bos	Men's sprint	10.214; 70.491	2	Kaňkovský (CZE); W 10.799; 66.672	Bye	Mulder (NED); W 11.164; 64.493	Bye	Edgar (GBR); W 11.024, W 10.905	Wolff (GER); W 10.502, W 10.639	Bayley (AUS); W 10.710, L, L	2nd place, silver medalist(s)
Teun Mulder	Men's sprint	10.565; 68.149	12	Zieliński (POL); L	Kim C-B (KOR); Kaňkovský (CZE); W 10.740; 67.039	Bos (NED); L	Forde (BAR); Villanueva (ESP); L	Did not advance		9th place final Villanueva (ESP); Ng (MAS); Eadie (AUS); L	10
Yvonne Hijgenaar	Women's sprint	11.400; 63.157	5	Larreal (VEN); L	Meinke (GER); Pendleton (GBR); L	—N/a		Did not advance		9th place final Pendleton (GBR); Reed (USA); Radanova (BUL); L	11
Jan Bos; Theo Bos; Teun Mulder	Men's team sprint	44.539; 60.621	6 Q	Japan; L 44.370; 60.851	—N/a					Did not advance	6

Pursuit

Athlete	Event	Qualification		Semifinals		Final	
Athlete	Event	Time	Rank	Opponent Results	Rank	Opponent Results	Rank
Levi Heimans	Men's individual pursuit	DNS		Did not advance			
Leontien van Moorsel	Women's individual pursuit	3:30.422	3 Q	Thürig (SUI); 3:28.747	3 Q	Bates (AUS); 3:27.037	3rd place, bronze medalist(s)
Levi Heimans; Jens Mouris; Peter Schep; Jeroen Straathof	Men's team pursuit	4:06.286	5 Q	Germany; 4:04.605	5	Did not advance	

Time trial

Athlete	Event	Time	Rank
Theo Bos	Men's time trial	1:01.986	5
Teun Mulder	Men's time trial	1:03.165	11
Yvonne Hijgenaar	Women's time trial	34.532	5

Keirin

Athlete	Event	1st round	Repechage	2nd round	Final
Athlete	Event	Rank	Rank	Rank	Rank
Theo Bos	Men's keirin	5 R	1 Q	DNF	11
Teun Mulder	Men's keirin	3 R	4	Did not advance	

Omnium

Athlete	Event	Points	Laps	Rank
Peter Schep	Men's points race	58	2	7
Adrie Visser	Women's points race	5	0	11
Robert Slippens; Danny Stam	Men's madison	2	−1	14

=== Mountain biking ===
Athlete	Event	Time	Rank
Thijs Al	Men's cross-country	2:27:13	25
Bart Brentjens	Men's cross-country	2:17:05	3rd place, bronze medalist(s)
Bas Peters	Men's cross-country	2:21:44	13
Elsbeth van Rooy-Vink	Women's cross-country	2:01:41	5

== Equestrian ==
Because only three horse and rider pairs from each nation could advance beyond certain rounds in the individual events, five American pairs did not advance despite being placed sufficiently high. They received rankings below all pairs that did advance.

=== Dressage ===
Athlete	Horse	Event	Grand Prix		Grand Prix Special		Grand Prix Freestyle		Overall	
Athlete	Horse	Event	Score	Rank	Score	Rank	Score	Rank	Score	Rank
Imke Bartels	Lancet	Individual	69.750	15 Q	71.720	13 Q	74.850	12	72.107	11
Sven Rothenberger	Barclay I	Individual	69.833	14 Q	69.040	17	Did not advance			
Marlies van Baalen	Idocus	Individual	64.583	43	Did not advance					
Anky van Grunsven	Salinero	Individual	74.208	3 Q	77.800	2 Q	85.825	1	79.278	1st place, gold medalist(s)
Imke Bartels; Sven Rothenberger; Marlies van Baalen; Anky van Grunsven	See above	Team	—N/a						71.264	4

=== Show jumping ===
Athlete	Horse	Event	Qualification								Final					Total	
Athlete	Horse	Event	Round 1		Round 2			Round 3			Round A		Round B			Total	
Athlete	Horse	Event	Penalties	Rank	Penalties	Total	Rank	Penalties	Total	Rank	Penalties	Rank	Penalties	Total	Rank	Penalties	Rank
Gert-Jan Bruggink	Joel	Individual	4	=19	0	4	=5 Q	4	8	=5 Q	12	=30	Did not advance				
Gerco Schröder	Monaco	Individual	5	=31	8	13	=33 Q	13	17	21	Did not advance						
Wim Schröder	Montreal	Individual	0	=1	4	4	=5 Q	8	12	=13 Q	4	=4 Q	Eliminated				
Leopold van Asten	Fleche Rouge	Individual	4	=19	4	8	=16 Q	8	16	=19 Q	12	=30	Did not advance				
Gert-Jan Bruggink; Gerco Schröder; Wim Schröder; Leopold van Asten	See above	Team	—N/a								8	=1 Q	16	24	=6	24	4

== Fencing ==
Women

Athlete	Event	Round of 64	Round of 32	Round of 16	Quarterfinal	Semifinal	Final / BM	
Athlete	Event	Opposition Score	Opposition Score	Opposition Score	Opposition Score	Opposition Score	Opposition Score	Rank
Sonja Tol	Individual épée	Bye	Mincza-Nébald (HUN); L 7–15	Did not advance				

== Field hockey ==
=== Men's tournament ===
Roster

The following is the Dutch roster in the men's field hockey tournament of the 2004 Summer Olympics.

Head coach: Terry Walsh

1. Guus Vogels (GK)
2. Rob Derikx
3. Geert-Jan Derikx
4. Erik Jazet
6. Floris Evers
7. Sander van der Weide
8. Ronald Brouwer
10. Taeke Taekema
11. Marten Eikelboom
12. Jeroen Delmee (C)
13. Klaas Veering (GK)
14. Teun de Nooijer
15. Karel Klaver
18. Rob Reckers
19. Matthijs Brouwer
22. Jesse Mahieu

Group play

Pos	Team	Pld	W	D	L	GF	GA	GD	Pts	Qualification
1	Netherlands	5	5	0	0	16	9	+7	15	Semi-finals
2	Australia	5	3	1	1	14	10	+4	10	Semi-finals
3	New Zealand	5	3	0	2	13	11	+2	9	5–8th place semi-finals
4	India	5	1	1	3	11	13	−2	4	5–8th place semi-finals
5	South Africa	5	1	0	4	9	15	−6	3	9–12th place semi-finals
6	Argentina	5	0	2	3	8	13	−5	2	9–12th place semi-finals

Source: FIH

15 August 2004
20:30

Netherlands	3 – 1	India
Eikelboom 2'; De Nooijer 50'; Taekema 54'	Report	G. A. Singh 69'

Umpires:
Murray Grime (AUS)
Jason McCracken (NZL)

17 August 2004
20:00

New Zealand	3 – 4	Netherlands
Shaw 9', 55'; Burrows 59'	Report	Taekema 4', 24'; Klaver 39'; Van der Weide 68'

Umpires:
David Gentles (AUS)
Sumesh Putra (CAN)

19 August 2004
08:30

Netherlands	3 – 2	South Africa
Derikx 29'; De Nooijer 49'; Klaver 69'	Report	Evans 17'; Symons 23'

Umpires:
Jason McCracken (NZL)
Han Jin-Soo (KOR)

21 August 2004
18:30

Argentina	2 – 4	Netherlands
Almada 37'; Lombi 52'	Report	Reckers 17'; Klaver 22'; Taekema 26'; De Nooijer 44'

Umpires:
Amarjit Singh (MAS)
Murray Grime (AUS)

23 August 2004
20:30

Australia	1 – 2	Netherlands
Brooks 28'	Report	Taekema 10', 13'

Umpires:
Xavier Adell (ESP)
Amarjit Singh (MAS)

Semifinals

25 August 2004
18:30

Netherlands	3 – 2	Germany
Taekema 5'; Eikelboom 47'; De Nooijer 52'	Report	Witthaus 3'; Bechmann 58'

Umpires:
Murray Grime (AUS)
Ray O'Connor (IRL)

Gold medal match

27 August 2004
20:30

Netherlands	1 – 2 (a.e.t.)	Australia
Brouwer 29'	Report	Brooks 37'; Dwyer 78'

Umpires:
Ray O'Connor (IRL)
John Wright (RSA)

=== Women's tournament ===
Roster

The following is the Dutch roster in the women's field hockey tournament of the 2004 Summer Olympics.

Head coach: Marc Lammers

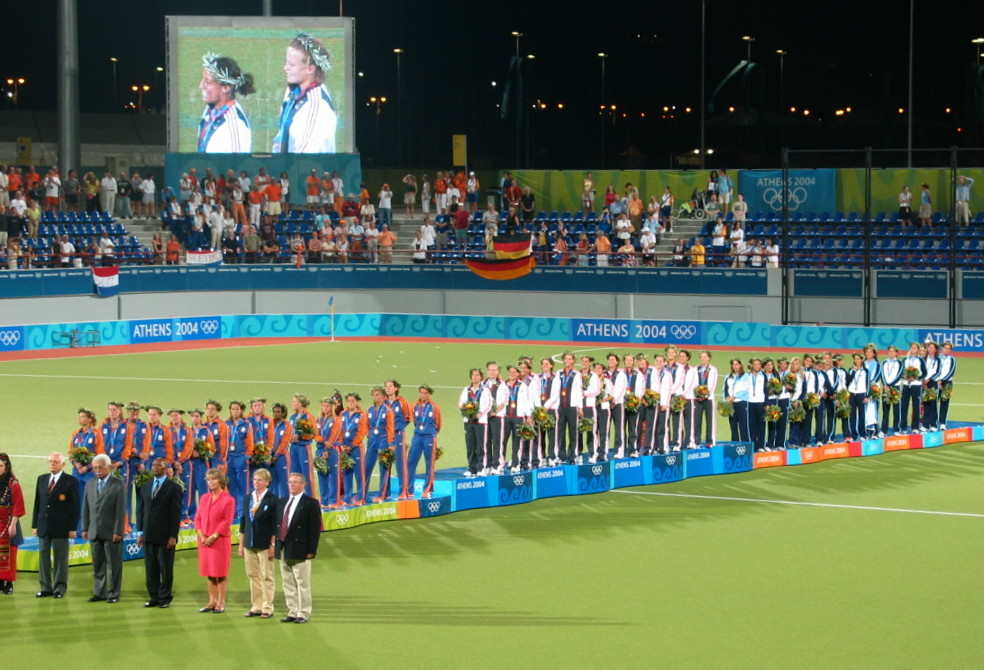
The Dutch team (blue/orange) on the podium after winning silver

1. Clarinda Sinnige (GK)
2. Lisanne de Roever (GK)
3. Macha van der Vaart
4. Fatima Moreira de Melo
5. Jiske Snoeks
6. Maartje Scheepstra
7. Miek van Geenhuizen
9. Sylvia Karres
10. Mijntje Donners (C)
11. Ageeth Boomgaardt
13. Minke Smeets
14. Minke Booij
15. Janneke Schopman
16. Chantal de Bruijn
17. Eefke Mulder
21. Lieve van Kessel

Group play

Pos	Team	Pld	W	D	L	GF	GA	GD	Pts	Qualification
1	Netherlands	4	4	0	0	14	5	+9	12	Semi-finals
2	Germany	4	2	0	2	6	10	−4	6	Semi-finals
3	South Korea	4	1	1	2	9	8	+1	4	
4	Australia	4	1	1	2	6	5	+1	4	
5	South Africa	4	1	0	3	5	12	−7	3	

Source: FIH
Rules for classification: 1) Points; 2) Matches won; 3) Goal difference; 4) Goals for; 5) Head-to-head result.

14 August 2004
08:30

Netherlands	6 – 2	South Africa
Donners 6', 19', 37'; Boomgaardt 15'; Moreira de Melo 23'; Scheepstra 25'	Report	Wilson 7', 53'

Umpires:
Lyn Farrell (NZL)
Gina Spitaleri (ITA)

16 August 2004
20:00

South Korea	2 – 3	Netherlands
Kim Jin-Kyoung 19'; Park Jeong-Sook 57'	Report	Van der Vaart 26', 35'; Booij 40'

Umpires:
Caroline de la Fuente (ARG)
Julie Ashton-Lucy (AUS)

18 August 2004
10:30

Netherlands	4 – 1	Germany
Scheepstra 7'; Boomgaardt 19'; Van Geenhuizen 21'; Karres 29'	Report	Ernsting-Krienke 40'

Umpires:
Chieko Akiyama (JPN)
Marelize de Klerk (RSA)

22 August 2004
20:00

Australia	0 – 1	Netherlands
	Report	Donners 47'

Umpires:
Marelize de Klerk (RSA)
Gina Spitaleri (ITA)

Semifinals

24 August 2004
18:00

Netherlands	2 – 2 (a.e.t.)	Argentina
Karres 41'; Donners 45'	Report	García 17'; Aicega 68'
Penalties
Schopman (penalty shoot-out scored); Boomgaardt (penalty shoot-out scored); Donners (penalty shoot-out scored); Van Kessel (penalty shoot-out scored)	4 – 2	(penalty shoot-out scored) Margalot; (penalty shoot-out missed) Rognoni; (penalty shoot-out scored) Aymar; (penalty shoot-out missed) Stepnik

Umpires:
Lyn Farrell (NZL)
Minka Woolley (AUS)

Gold medal match

26 August 2004
20:30

Netherlands	1 – 2	Germany
Scheepstra 38'	Report	Kühn 6'; Gude 20'

Umpires:
Marelize de Klerk (RSA)
Soledad Iparraguirre (ARG)

== Gymnastics ==
=== Artistic ===
Women

Athlete	Event	Qualification						Final					
Athlete	Event	Apparatus				Total	Rank	Apparatus				Total	Rank
Athlete	Event	V	UB	BB	F	Total	Rank	V	UB	BB	F	Total	Rank
Suzanne Harmes	All-around	9.125	9.137	8.162	9.337	35.761	42	Did not advance					
Laura van Leeuwen	All-around	9.037	9.437	8.600	8.412	35.486	46	Did not advance					

=== Trampoline ===
Athlete	Event	Qualification		Final	
Athlete	Event	Score	Rank	Score	Rank
Alan Villafuerte	Men's	44.90	15	Did not advance	
Rea Lenders	Women's	62.70	8 Q	24.30	8

== Judo ==
Seven Dutch judoka (four men and three women) qualified for the 2004 Summer Olympics.

Men

Athlete	Event	Round of 32	Round of 16	Quarterfinals	Semifinals	Repechage 1	Repechage 2	Repechage 3	Final / BM	
Athlete	Event	Opposition Result	Opposition Result	Opposition Result	Opposition Result	Opposition Result	Opposition Result	Opposition Result	Opposition Result	Rank
Guillaume Elmont	−81 kg	Azizov (AZE); L 0001–1010	Did not advance							
Mark Huizinga	−90 kg	Dempf (GER); W 1000–0000	Hwang H-T (KOR); L 0000–0001	Did not advance		Matyjaszek (POL); W 0021–0001	Morgan (CAN); W 1012–0000	Costa (ARG); W 1010–0000	Gordon (GBR); W 1001–0000	3rd place, bronze medalist(s)
Elco van der Geest	−100 kg	Miraliyev (AZE); W 1011–0001	El Gharbawy (EGY); W 1000–0000	Inoue (JPN); W 1020–0010	Makarau (BLR); L 0001–0011	Bye			Ze'evi (ISR); L 0001–1002	5
Dennis van der Geest	+100 kg	Morán (HON); W 1000–0000	Ikhsangaliyev (KAZ); W 1001–0001	Bianchessi (ITA); L 0000–0001	Did not advance	Bye	Kim S-B (KOR); W 1000–0001	Tölzer (GER); W 1000–0000	Miran (IRI); W 0201–0001	3rd place, bronze medalist(s)

Women

Athlete	Event	Round of 32	Round of 16	Quarterfinals	Semifinals	Repechage 1	Repechage 2	Repechage 3	Final / BM	
Athlete	Event	Opposition Result	Opposition Result	Opposition Result	Opposition Result	Opposition Result	Opposition Result	Opposition Result	Opposition Result	Rank
Deborah Gravenstijn	−57 kg	Cavazzuti (ITA); W 1000–0001	Wilson (USA); W 1011–0001	Zangrando (BRA); W 1010–0010	Bönisch (GER); L 0000–1000	Bye			Harel (FRA); W 1000–0010	3rd place, bronze medalist(s)
Edith Bosch	−70 kg	Bye	Blanco (ESP); W 0111–0101	Copes (ARG); W 1000–0000	Böhm (GER); W 0110–0000	Bye			Ueno (JPN); L 0001–1000	2nd place, silver medalist(s)
Claudia Zwiers	−78 kg	Liu X (CHN); L 0111–1000	Did not advance			Moskalyuk (RUS); L 0000–0102	Did not advance			

== Rowing ==
Dutch rowers qualified the following boats:

Men

Athlete	Event	Heats		Repechage		Semifinals		Final	
Athlete	Event	Time	Rank	Time	Rank	Time	Rank	Time	Rank
Dirk Lippits	Single sculls	7:21.19	3 R	7:01.39	2 SA/B/C	7:05.94	5 FC	6:58.20	16
Joeri de Groot; Karel Dormans; Ivo Snijders; Gerard van der Linden	Lightweight four	5:52.52	2 SA/B	Bye		5:57.47	2 FA	5:58.94	4
Michiel Bartman; Chun Wei Cheung (cox); Geert-Jan Derksen; Gerritjan Eggenkamp; Jan Willem Gabriëls; Daniël Mensch; Diederik Simon; Matthijs Vellenga; Gijs Vermeulen	Eight	5:25.26	2 R	5:31.92	1 FA	—N/a		5:43.75	2nd place, silver medalist(s)

Women

Athlete	Event	Heats		Repechage		Semifinals		Final	
Athlete	Event	Time	Rank	Time	Rank	Time	Rank	Time	Rank
Femke Dekker	Single sculls	7:55.50	3 R	7:39.84	2 SA/B/C	8:10.76	6 FB	7:39.15	10
Kirsten van der Kolk; Marit van Eupen	Lightweight double sculls	7:00.46	3 R	6:52.53	1 SA/B	6:53.10	2 FA	6:58.54	3rd place, bronze medalist(s)
Annemiek de Haan; Hurnet Dekkers; Nienke Hommes; Sarah Siegelaar; Marlies Smulders; Helen Tanger; Annemariek van Rumpt; Froukje Wegman; Ester Workel (cox)	Eight	6:04.10	1 FA	Bye		—N/a		6:19.85	3rd place, bronze medalist(s)

Qualification Legend: FA=Final A (medal); FB=Final B (non-medal); FC=Final C (non-medal); FD=Final D (non-medal); FE=Final E (non-medal); FF=Final F (non-medal); SA/B=Semifinals A/B; SC/D=Semifinals C/D; SE/F=Semifinals E/F; R=Repechage

== Sailing ==
Dutch sailors have qualified one boat for each of the following events.

Men

Athlete	Event	Race											Net points	Final rank
Athlete	Event	1	2	3	4	5	6	7	8	9	10	M*	Net points	Final rank
Joeri van Dijk	Mistral	26	18	16	17	~~28~~	15	10	17	13	26	19	177	20
Jaap Zielhuis	Finn	~~22~~	19	18	12	13	7	12	16	14	13	12	136	19
Kalle Coster; Sven Coster	470	4	21	4	16	12	18	6	8	6	~~22~~	6	101	6
Mark Neeleman; Peter van Niekerk	Star	14	10	14	12	8	4	15	10	~~17~~	10	1	98	14

Women

Athlete	Event	Race											Net points	Final rank
Athlete	Event	1	2	3	4	5	6	7	8	9	10	M*	Net points	Final rank
Carolijn Brouwer	Europe	19	~~DSQ~~	18	21	15	17	18	13	8	20	2	151	19
Margriet Matthijsse; Lisa Westerhof	470	10	~~DSQ~~	1	RDG	4	10	7	7	19	12	15	100	9
Annemieke Bes; Petronella de Jong; Annelies Thies	Yngling	8	1	~~13~~	8	3	5	8	RDG	5	4	2	56	4

Open

Athlete	Event	Race											Net points	Final rank
Athlete	Event	1	2	3	4	5	6	7	8	9	10	M*	Net points	Final rank
Mitch Booth; Herbert Dercksen	Tornado	11	5	10	4	4	3	1	10	6	7	~~17~~	61	5

M = Medal race; OCS = On course side of the starting line; DSQ = Disqualified; DNF = Did not finish; DNS= Did not start; RDG = Redress given

== Shooting ==
Three Dutch shooters qualified to compete in the following events:

Men

Athlete	Event	Qualification		Final	
Athlete	Event	Points	Rank	Points	Rank
Dick Boschman	10 m air rifle	592	=18	Did not advance	
Dick Boschman	50 m rifle prone	587	=40	Did not advance	
Dick Boschman	50 m rifle 3 positions	1154	=26	Did not advance	
Hennie Dompeling	Skeet	119	=21	Did not advance	
Jan-Cor van der Greef	Skeet	115	=34	Did not advance	

== Swimming ==
Dutch swimmers earned qualifying standards in the following events (up to a maximum of 2 swimmers in each event at the A-standard time, and 1 at the B-standard time):

Men

Athlete	Event	Heat		Semifinal		Final	
Athlete	Event	Time	Rank	Time	Rank	Time	Rank
Joris Keizer	100 m butterfly	53.41	19	Did not advance			
Johan Kenkhuis	50 m freestyle	22.58	=18	Did not advance			
Pieter van den Hoogenband	50 m freestyle	22.56	17	Did not advance			
Pieter van den Hoogenband	100 m freestyle	48.70	1 Q	48.55	2 Q	48.17	1st place, gold medalist(s)
Pieter van den Hoogenband	200 m freestyle	1:47.32	2 Q	1:46.00	1 Q	1:45.23	2nd place, silver medalist(s)
Thijs van Valkengoed	100 m breaststroke	1:02.03	14 Q	1:02.36	16	Did not advance	
Thijs van Valkengoed	200 m breaststroke	2:16.80	26	Did not advance			
Johan Kenkhuis; Pieter van den Hoogenband; Mark Veens*; Mitja Zastrow; Klaas-Erik Zwering	4 × 100 m freestyle relay	3:16.42	4 Q	—N/a		3:14.36 NR	2nd place, silver medalist(s)

* Competed only in heats and received medals

Women

Athlete	Event	Heat		Semifinal		Final	
Athlete	Event	Time	Rank	Time	Rank	Time	Rank
Madelon Baans	100 m breaststroke	1:11.10	21	Did not advance			
Inge de Bruijn	50 m freestyle	24.66	1 Q	24.56	1 Q	24.58	1st place, gold medalist(s)
Inge de Bruijn	100 m freestyle	54.43	1 Q	54.06	2 Q	54.16	2nd place, silver medalist(s)
Inge de Bruijn	100 m butterfly	58.47	3 Q	57.50	1 Q	57.99	3rd place, bronze medalist(s)
Chantal Groot	100 m butterfly	1:00.49	21	Did not advance			
Marleen Veldhuis	50 m freestyle	25.28	=5 Q	25.27	=9	Did not advance	
Marleen Veldhuis	100 m freestyle	55.81	13 Q	55.32	11	Did not advance	
Inge de Bruijn; Inge Dekker; Chantal Groot; Annabel Kosten*; Marleen Veldhuis	4 × 100 m freestyle relay	3:39.93	3 Q	—N/a		3:37.59	3rd place, bronze medalist(s)
Chantal Groot; Celina Lemmen; Haike van Stralen; Marleen Veldhuis	4 × 200 m freestyle relay	8:08.96	9	—N/a		Did not advance	
Madelon Baans; Inge de Bruijn; Chantal Groot*; Stefanie Luiken; Marleen Veldhuis	4 × 100 m medley relay	4:08.72	8 Q	—N/a		4:07.36	6

* Competed only in heats and received medals

== Synchronized swimming ==
Two Dutch synchronized swimmers qualified a spot in the women's duet.

Athlete	Event	Technical routine		Free routine (preliminary)			Free routine (final)		
Athlete	Event	Points	Rank	Points	Total (technical + free)	Rank	Points	Total (technical + free)	Rank
Bianca van der Velden; Sonja van der Velden	Duet	44.334	13	44.833	89.167	13	Did not advance		

== Table tennis ==
Two Dutch table tennis players qualified for the following events.

Athlete	Event	Round 1	Round 2	Round 3	Round 4	Quarterfinals	Semifinals	Final / BM	
Athlete	Event	Opposition Result	Opposition Result	Opposition Result	Opposition Result	Opposition Result	Opposition Result	Opposition Result	Rank
Danny Heister	Men's singles	Bye	Matsushita (JPN); L 0–4	Did not advance					
Trinko Keen	Men's singles	Bye	Wosik (GER); W 4–3	Wang Lq (CHN); L 1–4	Did not advance				
Danny Heister; Trinko Keen	Men's doubles	—N/a	Bye	Henzell / Zalcberg (AUS); W 4–1	Chen Q / Ma L (CHN); L 2–4	Did not advance			

== Taekwondo ==
Two Dutch taekwondo jin qualified for the following events.

Athlete	Event	Round of 16	Quarterfinals	Semifinals	Repechage 1	Repechage 2	Final / BM	
Athlete	Event	Opposition Result	Opposition Result	Opposition Result	Opposition Result	Opposition Result	Opposition Result	Rank
Patrick Stevens	Men's −80 kg	Negrel (FRA); L 10–13	Did not advance					
Charmie Sobers	Women's −67 kg	Bainbridge (GBR); W 7–6	Rivero (PHI); L 4–10	Did not advance				

== Triathlon ==
Two Dutch triathletes qualified for the following events.

Athlete	Event	Swim (1.5 km)	Trans 1	Bike (40 km)	Trans 2	Run (10 km)	Total Time	Rank
Wieke Hoogzaad	Women's	19:44	0:21	1:10:42	0:24	39:21	2:09:47.21	25
Tracy Looze	Women's	20:40	0:21	1:12:48	0:25	37:07	2:10:35.81	29

== Volleyball ==
=== Beach ===
Athlete	Event	Preliminary round	Standing	Round of 16	Quarterfinals	Semifinals	Final	
Athlete	Event	Opposition Score	Standing	Opposition Score	Opposition Score	Opposition Score	Opposition Score	Rank
Rebekka Kadijk; Marrit Leenstra	Women's	Pool A Celbová – Nováková (CZE); L 0 – 2 (19–21, 16–21); May – Walsh (USA); L 0 – 2 (11–21, 13–21); Kusuhara – Tokuno (JPN); L 1 – 2 (21–15, 17–21, 13–15)	4	Did not advance				

=== Indoor ===
==== Men's tournament ====
Roster

The following is the Dutch roster in the men's volleyball tournament of the 2004 Summer Olympics.

Head coach: Bert Goedkoop

№	Name	Date of birth	Height	Weight	Spike	Block	2004 club
1	Dirk-Jan van Gendt	18 July 1974	1.85 m (6 ft 1 in)	78 kg (172 lb)	332 cm (131 in)	313 cm (123 in)	(Netherlands) Ortec Rotterdam Nesselande
2	Nico Freriks	22 December 1981	1.91 m (6 ft 3 in)	85 kg (187 lb)	327 cm (129 in)	306 cm (120 in)	(Netherlands) Omniworld
3	Marko Klok (L)	14 March 1968	1.94 m (6 ft 4 in)	88 kg (194 lb)	342 cm (135 in)	329 cm (130 in)	(Netherlands) Ortec Rotterdam Nesselande
4	Reinder Nummerdor (c)	10 September 1976	1.94 m (6 ft 4 in)	87 kg (192 lb)	342 cm (135 in)	321 cm (126 in)	(Italy) Estense Carife Ferrara
5	Guido Görtzen	9 November 1970	1.98 m (6 ft 6 in)	98 kg (216 lb)	349 cm (137 in)	340 cm (130 in)	(Italy) Umbria Volley
6	Richard Schuil	2 May 1973	2.02 m (6 ft 8 in)	92 kg (203 lb)	347 cm (137 in)	329 cm (130 in)	(Italy) Gioia del Colle Volley
7	Mike van de Goor	14 May 1973	2.06 m (6 ft 9 in)	96 kg (212 lb)	350 cm (140 in)	322 cm (127 in)	(Netherlands) Piet Zoomers Apeldoorn
9	Jeroen Trommel	1 August 1980	1.94 m (6 ft 4 in)	89 kg (196 lb)	340 cm (130 in)	310 cm (120 in)	(Netherlands) Omniworld
12	Robert Horstink	26 December 1981	2.01 m (6 ft 7 in)	84 kg (185 lb)	326 cm (128 in)	311 cm (122 in)	(Netherlands) Piet Zoomers Apeldoorn
14	Kay van Dijk	25 June 1984	2.12 m (6 ft 11 in)	96 kg (212 lb)	352 cm (139 in)	345 cm (136 in)	(Netherlands) VC Zwolle
17	Rob Bontje	12 May 1981	2.06 m (6 ft 9 in)	85 kg (187 lb)	366 cm (144 in)	340 cm (130 in)	(Netherlands) Ortec Rotterdam Nesselande
18	Albert Cristina	18 November 1970	1.94 m (6 ft 4 in)	94 kg (207 lb)	342 cm (135 in)	320 cm (130 in)	(Netherlands) Omniworld

Group play

Pos	Team	Pld	W	L	Pts	SW	SL	SR	SPW	SPL	SPR	Qualification
1	Brazil	5	4	1	9	13	7	1.857	483	431	1.121	Quarterfinals
2	Italy	5	3	2	8	13	7	1.857	465	434	1.071	Quarterfinals
3	United States	5	3	2	8	11	8	1.375	437	423	1.033	Quarterfinals
4	Russia	5	3	2	8	11	9	1.222	452	430	1.051	Quarterfinals
5	Netherlands	5	2	3	7	7	11	0.636	391	419	0.933	
6	Australia	5	0	5	5	2	15	0.133	331	422	0.784	

Source: FIVB

15 August 2004; 11:00	Netherlands	3–2	Russia	Peace and Friendship Stadium; Attendance: 2,060; Referees: Umit Sokullu (TUR), Dejan Jovanovic (SCG)
15 August 2004; 11:00	(25–23, 19–25, 17–25, 27–25, 18–16) result			Peace and Friendship Stadium; Attendance: 2,060; Referees: Umit Sokullu (TUR), Dejan Jovanovic (SCG)

17 August 2004; 16:00	United States	3–0	Netherlands	Peace and Friendship Stadium; Attendance: 3,000; Referees: Juan Pereyra (ARG), Abdullah Al-Khelaifi (KSA)
17 August 2004; 16:00	(26–24, 25–20, 25–18) result			Peace and Friendship Stadium; Attendance: 3,000; Referees: Juan Pereyra (ARG), Abdullah Al-Khelaifi (KSA)

19 August 2004; 11:00	Netherlands	1–3	Brazil	Peace and Friendship Stadium; Attendance: 4,150; Referees: Fernando Nava (MEX), Francisco Medina (CUB)
19 August 2004; 11:00	(22–25, 26–24, 21–25, 19–25) result			Peace and Friendship Stadium; Attendance: 4,150; Referees: Fernando Nava (MEX), Francisco Medina (CUB)

21 August 2004; 11:20	Italy	3–0	Netherlands	Peace and Friendship Stadium; Attendance: 6,200; Referees: Patrick Rachard (FRA), Bela Hobor (HUN)
21 August 2004; 11:20	(25–19, 25–21, 25–20) result			Peace and Friendship Stadium; Attendance: 6,200; Referees: Patrick Rachard (FRA), Bela Hobor (HUN)

23 August 2004; 14:00	Netherlands	3–0	Australia	Peace and Friendship Stadium; Attendance: 4,120; Referees: Mahmoud Abdel Magid (EGY), Juan Pereyra (ARG)
23 August 2004; 14:00	(25–22, 25–17, 25–16) result			Peace and Friendship Stadium; Attendance: 4,120; Referees: Mahmoud Abdel Magid (EGY), Juan Pereyra (ARG)

== See also ==
- Netherlands at the 2004 Summer Paralympics
