= Judo at the 2000 Summer Olympics – Men's +100 kg =

Judo competition

Men's +100 kg at the Games of the XXVII Olympiad
- Venue: Sydney Convention and Exhibition Centre
- Date: 22 September 2000
- Competitors: 32 from 32 nations

Medalists
1st place, gold medalist(s)		David Douillet	France
2nd place, silver medalist(s)		Shinichi Shinohara	Japan
3rd place, bronze medalist(s)		Indrek Pertelson	Estonia
3rd place, bronze medalist(s)		Tamerlan Tmenov	Russia

Men's +100 kg competition in judo at the 2000 Summer Olympics was held on 22 September at the Sydney Convention and Exhibition Centre.

This event was the heaviest of the men's judo weight classes, allowing competitors with over 100 kilograms of body mass. Like all other judo events, bouts lasted five minutes. If the bout was still tied at the end, it was extended for another five-minute, sudden-death period; if neither judoka scored during that period, the match is decided by the judges. The tournament bracket consisted of a single-elimination contest culminating in a gold medal match. There was also a repechage to determine the winners of the two bronze medals. Each judoka who had lost to a semifinalist competed in the repechage. The two judokas who lost in the semifinals faced the winner of the opposite half of the bracket's repechage in bronze medal bouts.

== Schedule ==
All times are Australian Eastern Daylight Time (UTC+11:00)

Date	Time	Round
Friday, 22 September 2000	15:00; 20:30	Preliminaries & Repechage; Final

== Tournament results ==
=== Final ===
Final
1	Shinichi Shinohara (JPN)	0010
2	David Douillet (FRA)	0020

=== Mat 1 ===
First round matches

	Score	
Martin Boonzaayer (USA)	0000–1000	Ángel Sánchez (CUB)

Elimination rounds

Round of 32
Dennis van der Geest (NED)	0000
Tamerlan Tmenov (RUS)	1001
Mahmoud Miran (IRI)	0001
Frank Möller (GER)	0001
Orlando Baccino (ARG)	1000
Imre Csösz (HUN)	0000
Pan Song (CHN)	1010
Badmaanyambuugiin Bat-Erdene (MGL)	0000
José Vásquez (DOM)	0000
Vyacheslav Berduta (KAZ)	1001
Shinichi Shinohara (JPN)	1000
Ruslan Sharapov (BLR)	0000
Rafał Kubacki (POL)	0001
Valentyn Ruslyakov (UKR)	0003
Nacanieli Qerewaqa (FIJ)	0000
Ángel Sánchez (CUB)	1000

Round of 16
Tamerlan Tmenov (RUS)	1000
Frank Möller (GER)	0000
Orlando Baccino (ARG)	0010
Pan Song (CHN)	1010
Vyacheslav Berduta (KAZ)	0010
Shinichi Shinohara (JPN)	1001
Valentyn Ruslyakov (UKR)	0001
Ángel Sánchez (CUB)	0001

Quarterfinals
Tamerlan Tmenov (RUS)	1111
Pan Song (CHN)	0000
Shinichi Shinohara (JPN)	0010
Ángel Sánchez (CUB)	0001

Semifinals
Tamerlan Tmenov (RUS)	0021
Shinichi Shinohara (JPN)	1011

=== Mat 2 ===
Round of 32
Ernesto Pérez (ESP)	1010
Ahmed Baly (EGY)	0030
Indrek Pertelson (EST)	1000
Steeve Nguema Ndong (GAB)	0001
Mohamed Bouaichaoui (ALG)	0001
Daniel Hernandes (BRA)	1012
Gabriel Munteanu (ROM)	0000
Petr Jákl (CZE)	1011
Selim Tataroğlu (TUR)	0011
Alexander Davitashvili (GEO)	0001
Abdullo Tangriev (UZB)	1000
Robert Ball (AUS)	0000
Harry van Barneveld (BEL)	1100
Ko Kyung-doo (KOR)	0001

Round of 16
Ernesto Pérez (ESP)	0001
Indrek Pertelson (EST)	0200
Daniel Hernandes (BRA)	1000
Petr Jákl (CZE)	0000
David Douillet (FRA)	1010
Selim Tataroğlu (TUR)	0001
Abdullo Tangriev (UZB)	0021
Harry van Barneveld (BEL)	1021

Quarterfinals
Indrek Pertelson (EST)	1000
Daniel Hernandes (BRA)	0000
David Douillet (FRA)	1000
Harry van Barneveld (BEL)	0010

Semifinals
Indrek Pertelson (EST)	0000
David Douillet (FRA)	1001

=== Repechage ===
The losing semifinalists as well as those judoka eliminated in earlier rounds by the four semifinalists of the main bracket advanced to the repechage. These matches determined the two bronze medalists for the event.

First round
Dennis van der Geest (NED)	1001
Frank Möller (GER)	0001
Ruslan Sharapov (BLR)	1000
Vyacheslav Berduta (KAZ)	0100
Steeve Nguema Ndong (GAB)	0000
Ernesto Pérez (ESP)	1000

Second round
Dennis van der Geest (NED)	0011
Pan Song (CHN)	0100
Ruslan Sharapov (BLR)	1000
Ángel Sánchez (CUB)	0100
Ernesto Pérez (ESP)	1000
Daniel Hernandes (BRA)	0001
Selim Tataroğlu (TUR)	1010
Harry van Barneveld (BEL)	0010

Third round
Pan Song (CHN)	0011
Ruslan Sharapov (BLR)	0100
Ernesto Pérez (ESP)	0000
Selim Tataroğlu (TUR)	1020

Bronze medal finals
Ruslan Sharapov (BLR)	0000
Indrek Pertelson (EST)	1000
Selim Tataroğlu (TUR)	0001
Tamerlan Tmenov (RUS)	1010
