= Judo at the 2004 Summer Olympics – Men's +100 kg =

Judo competition

Men's +100 kg at the Games of the XXVIII Olympiad
- Venue: Ano Liosia Olympic Hall
- Dates: 20 August 2004
- Competitors: 33 from 33 nations
- Winning score: 1000

Medalists
1st place, gold medalist(s)		Keiji Suzuki	Japan
2nd place, silver medalist(s)		Tamerlan Tmenov	Russia
3rd place, bronze medalist(s)		Indrek Pertelson	Estonia
3rd place, bronze medalist(s)		Dennis van der Geest	Netherlands

Men's +100 kg competition in judo at the 2004 Summer Olympics was held on August 19 at the Ano Liossia Olympic Hall.

This event was the heaviest of the men's judo weight classes, allowing competitors with over 100 kilograms of body mass. Like all other judo events, bouts lasted five minutes. If the bout was still tied at the end, it was extended for another five-minute, sudden-death period; if neither judoka scored during that period, the match was decided by the judges. The tournament bracket consisted of a single-elimination contest culminating in a gold medal match. There was also a repechage to determine the winners of the two bronze medals. Each judoka who had lost to a semifinalist competed in the repechage. The two judokas who lost in the semifinals faced the winner of the opposite half of the bracket's repechage in bronze medal bouts.

== Schedule ==
All times are Greece Standard Time (UTC+2)

Date	Time	Round
Friday, 20 August 2004	10:30; 13:00; 17:00	Preliminaries; Repechage; Final

== Qualifying athletes ==
Mat	Athlete	Country
1	Vitaliy Polyanskyy	Ukraine
1	Islam El Shehaby	Egypt
1	Paolo Bianchessi	Italy
1	Aytami Ruano	Spain
1	Kim Sung-bum	South Korea
1	Dennis van der Geest	Netherlands
1	Luis Alonso Morán	Honduras
1	Yeldos Ikhsangaliyev	Kazakhstan
1	Hadir Lazame	Iraq
1	Keiji Suzuki	Japan
1	Andreas Tölzer	Germany
1	Leonel Wilfredo Ruíz	Venezuela
1	Charalampos Papaioannou	Greece
1	Orlando Baccino	Argentina
1	Yury Rybak	Belarus
1	Pan Song	China
1	Grzegorz Eitel	Poland
2	Mahmoud Miran	Iran
2	Joel Brutus	Haiti
2	Lasha Gujejiani	Georgia
2	Selim Tataroğlu	Turkey
2	Majid Al-Ali	Kuwait
2	Martin Boonzaayer	United States
2	Semir Pepic	Australia
2	Sergio Camacho	Colombia
2	Chukwuemeka Onyemachi	Nigeria
2	Daniel Hernandes	Brazil
2	Tamerlan Tmenov	Russia
2	Gabriel Munteanu	Romania
2	Abdullo Tangriev	Uzbekistan
2	Matthieu Bataille	France
2	Mohamed Bouaichaoui	Algeria
2	Indrek Pertelson	Estonia

== Tournament results ==
=== Final ===
Final
1	Keiji Suzuki (JPN)	1000
2	Tamerlan Tmenov (RUS)	0000

=== Mat 1 ===
Round of 64
Aytami Ruano (ESP)	0001
Kim Sung-bum (KOR)	0010

Round of 32
Vitaliy Polyanskyy (UKR)	1000
Islam El Shehaby (EGY)	0000
Paolo Bianchessi (ITA)	0200
Kim Sung-bum (KOR)	0000
Dennis van der Geest (NED)	1000
Luis Alonso Morán (HON)	0000
Yeldos Ikhsangaliyev (KAZ)	1000
Hadir Lazame (IRQ)	0000
Keiji Suzuki (JPN)	0120
Andreas Tölzer (GER)	0010
Leonel Wilfredo Ruíz (VEN)	0000
Charalampos Papaioannou (GRE)	1010
Orlando Baccino (ARG)	0000
Yury Rybak (BLR)	1001
Pan Song (CHN)	1001
Grzegorz Eitel (POL)	0000

Round of 16
Vitaliy Polyanskyy (UKR)	0000
Paolo Bianchessi (ITA)	0201
Dennis van der Geest (NED)	1001
Yeldos Ikhsangaliyev (KAZ)	0001
Keiji Suzuki (JPN)	1101
Charalampos Papaioannou (GRE)	0001
Yury Rybak (BLR)	0210
Pan Song (CHN)	0000

Quarterfinals
Paolo Bianchessi (ITA)	0001
Dennis van der Geest (NED)	0000
Keiji Suzuki (JPN)	1011
Yury Rybak (BLR)	0100

Semifinals
Paolo Bianchessi (ITA)	0001
Keiji Suzuki (JPN)	1010

=== Mat 2 ===
Round of 64

Round of 32
Mahmoud Miran (IRI)	1002
Joel Brutus (HAI)	0001
Lasha Gujejiani (GEO)	0000
Selim Tataroğlu (TUR)	1011
Majid Al-Ali (KUW)	0000
Martin Boonzaayer (USA)	1010
Semir Pepic (AUS)	1000
Sergio Camacho (COL)	0000
Chukwuemeka Onyemachi (NGR)	0000
Daniel Hernandes (BRA)	0100
Tamerlan Tmenov (RUS)	1110
Gabriel Munteanu (ROU)	0000
Abdullo Tangriev (UZB)	1120
Matthieu Bataille (FRA)	0001
Mohamed Bouaichaoui (ALG)	0001
Indrek Pertelson (EST)	1010

Round of 16
Mahmoud Miran (IRI)	1002
Selim Tataroğlu (TUR)	0001
Martin Boonzaayer (USA)	0000
Semir Pepic (AUS)	1010
Daniel Hernandes (BRA)	0000
Tamerlan Tmenov (RUS)	1110
Abdullo Tangriev (UZB)	0010
Indrek Pertelson (EST)	0021

Quarterfinals
Mahmoud Miran (IRI)	0110
Semir Pepic (AUS)	0100
Tamerlan Tmenov (RUS)	1110
Indrek Pertelson (EST)	0001

Semifinals
Mahmoud Miran (IRI)	0010
Tamerlan Tmenov (RUS)	1110

=== Repechage ===
Those judoka eliminated in earlier rounds by the four semifinalists of the main bracket advanced to the repechage. These matches determined the two bronze medalists for the event.

First round
Kim Sung-bum (KOR)	1000
Vitaliy Polyanskyy (UKR)	0000
Andreas Tölzer (GER)	0200
Charalampos Papaioannou (GRE)	0000
Joel Brutus (HAI)	0000
Selim Tataroğlu (TUR)	1000
Gabriel Munteanu (ROU)	0000
Daniel Hernandes (BRA)	1000

Second round
Dennis van der Geest (NED)	1000
Kim Sung-bum (KOR)	0001
Yury Rybak (BLR)	0000
Andreas Tölzer (GER)	1000
Semir Pepic (AUS)	0010
Selim Tataroğlu (TUR)	0110
Indrek Pertelson (EST)	1110
Daniel Hernandes (BRA)	0100

Third round
Dennis van der Geest (NED)	1000
Andreas Tölzer (GER)	0000
Selim Tataroğlu (TUR)	0100
Indrek Pertelson (EST)	0200

Bronze medal finals
Mahmoud Miran (IRI)	0001
Dennis van der Geest (NED)	0201
Paolo Bianchessi (ITA)	0000
Indrek Pertelson (EST)	1000
