= Judo at the 1998 Asian Games – Men's +100 kg =

Judo competition

Men's +100 kg at the 1998 Asian Games
- Venue: Thammasat Gymnasium 1
- Date: 10 December 1998
- Competitors: 13 from 13 nations

Medalists
gold medal	Shinichi Shinohara	Japan
silver medal	Mahmoud Miran	Iran
bronze medal	Ochiryn Odgerel	Mongolia
bronze medal	Pan Song	China

The men's +100 kilograms (Heavyweight) competition at the 1998 Asian Games in Bangkok was held on 10 December 1998 at the Thammasat Gymnasium 1.

== Schedule ==
All times are Indochina Time (UTC+07:00)

Date	Time	Event
Thursday, 10 December 1998	14:00	Round 1
Thursday, 10 December 1998	14:00	Quarterfinals
Thursday, 10 December 1998	14:00	Repechage
Thursday, 10 December 1998	14:00	Semifinals
Thursday, 10 December 1998	14:00	Finals

== Results ==
Legend

- DEC — Won by decision
- IPP — Won by ippon
- YUK — Won by yuko

=== Main bracket ===
Round 1
Ochiryn Odgerel (MGL)	IPP
Khemkham Kommanivong (LAO)
Kim Se-hoon (KOR)	IPP
Rudy Hachache (LIB)
Pitak Kampita (THA)
Shinichi Shinohara (JPN)	IPP
Vyacheslav Berduta (KAZ)	IPP
Huang Ho-suei (TPE)
Saidakhtam Rakhimov (TJK)
Mahmoud Miran (IRI)	IPP

Quarterfinals
Ochiryn Odgerel (MGL)
Kim Se-hoon (KOR)	IPP
Shinichi Shinohara (JPN)	IPP
Magomed Esmurziev (KGZ)
Rustam Yusupov (UZB)
Vyacheslav Berduta (KAZ)	IPP
Mahmoud Miran (IRI)	IPP
Pan Song (CHN)

Semifinals
Kim Se-hoon (KOR)
Shinichi Shinohara (JPN)	YUK
Vyacheslav Berduta (KAZ)
Mahmoud Miran (IRI)	IPP

Final
Shinichi Shinohara (JPN)	IPP
Mahmoud Miran (IRI)

=== Repechage ===
Repechage 1
Rudy Hachache (LIB)
Ochiryn Odgerel (MGL)	IPP
Pitak Kampita (THA)
Magomed Esmurziev (KGZ)	IPP
Huang Ho-suei (TPE)
Rustam Yusupov (UZB)	IPP
Saidakhtam Rakhimov (TJK)
Pan Song (CHN)	IPP

Repechage 2
Ochiryn Odgerel (MGL)	IPP
Magomed Esmurziev (KGZ)
Rustam Yusupov (UZB)
Pan Song (CHN)	IPP

Bronze medals
Ochiryn Odgerel (MGL)	DEC
Vyacheslav Berduta (KAZ)
Pan Song (CHN)	IPP
Kim Se-hoon (KOR)
