= Kim Sung-bum (judoka) =

South Korean judoka (born 1979)

Personal information
- Nationality: South Korea
- Born: 30 May 1979 (age 47)
- Height: 1.92 m (6 ft 3 1/2 in)
- Weight: 118 kg (260 lb)

Korean name
- Hangul: 김성범
- RR: Gim Seongbeom
- MR: Kim Sŏngbŏm

Sport
- Sport: Judo
- Event: +100 kg
- Club: Korea Racing Association
- Coached by: An Byung-Geun
Medal record
Men's judo
Representing South Korea
Asian Games
| Gold medal – first place | 2006 Doha | Open |
Universiade
| Gold medal – first place | 2007 Bangkok | +100 kg |
| Bronze medal – third place | 2003 Daegu | +100 kg |
Asian Championships
| Gold medal – first place | 2004 Almaty | +100 kg |
| Bronze medal – third place | 2003 Jeju City | +100 kg |
| Bronze medal – third place | 2007 Kuwait City | +100 kg |
| Bronze medal – third place | 2008 Jeju City | +100 kg |

Kim Sung-bum (Korean: 김성범; born May 30, 1979) is a South Korean judoka, who competed in the men's heavyweight category. He is a two-time Olympian, and four-time medalist at the Asian Judo Championships. He defeated Iran's Mahmoud Miran for the gold medal in the open weight division at the 2006 Asian Games in Doha, Qatar. Kim also captured two more medals (gold and bronze) for the same division at the 2003 Summer Universiade in Jeju City, and at the 2007 Summer Universiade in Bangkok, Thailand.

Kim made his official debut for the 2004 Summer Olympics in Athens, where he competed for the men's heavyweight class (+100 kg). He defeated Spain's Aytami Ruano in the first preliminary round, before losing out his next match by a waza-ari-awasete-ippon (full point) and a soto makikomi (outer wraparound) to Italy's Paolo Bianchessi. Kim took advantage of the repechage rounds by defeating Ukraine's Vitaliy Polyanskyy, but lost again in the second bout this time to Netherlands' Dennis van der Geest, who successfully scored an ippon and an ōuchi gari (big inner reap), at two minutes and five seconds.

Four years later, Kim qualified for the second time in the men's +100 kg class, as a 29-year-old, at the 2008 Summer Olympics in Beijing, after winning the bronze medal from the Asian Judo Championships in Jeju City. Unlike his previous Olympics, Kim defeated Haiti's Joel Brutus in the first preliminary round, before losing out his next match, by an ippon and a seoi nage, to Estonia's Martin Padar.
