= 1995 Asian Judo Championships =

Judo competition

The 1995 Asian Judo Championships were held in New Delhi, India 20, 21 and 23 November 1995.

== Medal overview ==
=== Men's events ===
Event	Gold	Silver	Bronze
Extra-lightweight (60 kg)	Kazuhiko Tokuno (JPN)	Alisher Mukhtarov (UZB)	Narender Singh (IND)
Extra-lightweight (60 kg)	Kazuhiko Tokuno (JPN)	Alisher Mukhtarov (UZB)	Kim Jong-Won (KOR)
Half-lightweight (65 kg)	Kim Dae-Ik (KOR)	Najib Aga (IND)	Zhang Guangjun (CHN)
Half-lightweight (65 kg)	Kim Dae-Ik (KOR)	Najib Aga (IND)	P. Nyalhagva (MGL)
Lightweight (71 kg)	Kenzo Nakamura (JPN)	Kwak Dae-Sung (KOR)	Akhat Achirov (KAZ)
Lightweight (71 kg)	Kenzo Nakamura (JPN)	Kwak Dae-Sung (KOR)	Khaliuny Boldbaatar (MGL)
Half-middleweight (78 kg)	Makoto Takimoto (JPN)	Cho In-Chul (KOR)	Vladimir Shmakov (UZB)
Half-middleweight (78 kg)	Makoto Takimoto (JPN)	Cho In-Chul (KOR)	Yuan Chao (CHN)
Middleweight (86 kg)	Jeon Ki-Young (KOR)	Sergey Alimzhanov (KAZ)	Masaru Tanabe (JPN)
Middleweight (86 kg)	Jeon Ki-Young (KOR)	Sergey Alimzhanov (KAZ)	Armen Bagdasarov (UZB)
Half-heavyweight (95 kg)	Sergey Shakimov (KAZ)	Takeshi Kozai (JPN)	Qiao Chunlin (CHN)
Half-heavyweight (95 kg)	Sergey Shakimov (KAZ)	Takeshi Kozai (JPN)	Kim Jae-sik (KOR)
Heavyweight (+95 kg)	Shinichi Shinohara (JPN)	Dmitry Solovyov (UZB)	Liu Shenggang (CHN)
Heavyweight (+95 kg)	Shinichi Shinohara (JPN)	Dmitry Solovyov (UZB)	Saidahtam Rahimov (TJK)
Openweight	Shinichi Shinohara (JPN)	B. Badmaanyambuu (MGL)	Nurullo Loikov (TJK)
Openweight	Shinichi Shinohara (JPN)	B. Badmaanyambuu (MGL)	Liu Shenggang (CHN)

=== Women's events ===
Event	Gold	Silver	Bronze
Extra-lightweight (48 kg)	Atsuko Nagai (JPN)	Yu Shu-Chen (TPE)	Tang Lihong (CHN)
Extra-lightweight (48 kg)	Atsuko Nagai (JPN)	Yu Shu-Chen (TPE)	Galina Ataýewa (TKM)
Half-lightweight (52 kg)	Park Mi-Ja (KOR)	Xian Dongmei (CHN)	Atsuko Takeda (JPN)
Half-lightweight (52 kg)	Park Mi-Ja (KOR)	Xian Dongmei (CHN)	Sunith Thakur (IND)
Lightweight (56 kg)	Jung Sun-Yong (KOR)	Chiyori Tateno (JPN)	Huang Ai-Chun (TPE)
Lightweight (56 kg)	Jung Sun-Yong (KOR)	Chiyori Tateno (JPN)	Liu Liang (CHN)
Half-middleweight (61 kg)	Jung Sung-Sook (KOR)	Liu Lizhe (CHN)	Yuko Emoto (JPN)
Half-middleweight (61 kg)	Jung Sung-Sook (KOR)	Liu Lizhe (CHN)	V.Katsouleva (KAZ)
Middleweight (66 kg)	Wu Mei-Ling (TPE)	Aiko Oishi (JPN)	Wang Xianbo (CHN)
Middleweight (66 kg)	Wu Mei-Ling (TPE)	Aiko Oishi (JPN)	Cho Min-Sun (KOR)
Half-heavyweight (72 kg)	Yuriko Fukuba (JPN)	Evguenia Bogounova (KAZ)	Olesýa Nazarenko (TKM)
Half-heavyweight (72 kg)	Yuriko Fukuba (JPN)	Evguenia Bogounova (KAZ)	Chen Chiu-Ping (TPE)
Heavyweight (+72 kg)	Lee Hyun-Kyung (KOR)	Yukari Asada (JPN)	M.Daouletkere (KAZ)
Heavyweight (+72 kg)	Lee Hyun-Kyung (KOR)	Yukari Asada (JPN)	Sun Yanyan (CHN)
Openweight	Shon Hyun-Me (KOR)	Nadajda Teltakova (TKM)	Sun Yanyan (CHN)
Openweight	Shon Hyun-Me (KOR)	Nadajda Teltakova (TKM)	Yuko Tonooka (JPN)

=== Medals table ===
Rank	Nation	Gold	Silver	Bronze	Total
1	Japan	7	4	4	15
2	South Korea	7	2	3	12
3	Kazakhstan	1	2	3	6
4	Chinese Taipei	1	1	2	4
5	China	0	2	10	12
6	Uzbekistan	0	2	2	4
7	Mongolia	0	1	2	3
7	Turkmenistan	0	1	2	3
9	India	0	1	1	2
10	Tajikistan	0	0	2	2
11	Indonesia	0	0	1	1
Totals (11 entries)		16	16	32	64
