= Leonel Wilfredo Ruiz =

Venezuelan Olympic judoka

Leonel Wilfredo Ruíz
Personal information
- Full name: Leonel Wilfredo Ruíz Carmona
- Nationality: Venezuela
- Born: 27 July 1975 (age 50) Caracas, Venezuela
- Height: 1.87 m (6 ft 1 1/2 in)
- Weight: 178 kg (392 lb)

Sport
- Sport: Judo
- Event: +100 kg

Leonel Wilfredo Ruíz Carmona (born July 27, 1975, in Caracas, Venezuela) is a Venezuelan judoka, who competed in the men's heavyweight category. He picked up a gold medal in the over-100 kg division at the 2004 Pan American Championships in Margarita Island, and also represented his nation Venezuela at the 2004 Summer Olympics.

Ruiz qualified for the Venezuelan squad in the men's heavyweight class (+100 kg) at the 2004 Summer Olympics in Athens, by topping the field in his own division and receiving a berth from the Pan American Championships in Margarita Island. Much to the delight to the home crowd inside Ano Liossia Hall, Ruiz fell short in a, full-minute ippon and a yoko shiho gatame to the host nation Greece's Charalampos Papaioannou during their opening match.
