= Vitaliy Polyanskyy (judoka) =

Ukrainian judoka (born 1981)

Vitaliy Polyanksyy
Personal information
- Full name: VITALIY POLYANSKYY
- Nickname: SLON
- Born: 26 January 1981 (age 45) Dnipropetrovsk, Ukrainian SSR, Soviet Union
- Home town: Toronto, Canada
- Occupation: Judoka
- Height: 1.98 m (6 ft 6 in)

Sport
- Country: Ukraine
- Sport: Judo
- Weight class: –100 kg, +100 kg
- College team: Academy Customs of Ukraine
- Club: TAIFU Dnipro, TAIFU Toronto
- Coached by: Danil Volovich
Medal record
Men's judo
Representing Ukraine
European U23 Championships
Bronze medal – third place	2003 Yerevan	+100 kg
European Junior Championships
Bronze medal – third place	2000 Nicosia	–100 kg
Summer Universiade
Bronze medal – third place	2007 Bangkok	Open

Profile at external databases
- IJF: 6054
- JudoInside.com: 11233
- Updated on 17 February 2022

Vitaliy Oleksandovych Polyanskyi (Ukrainian: Віталій Олександрович Полянський; born 26 January 1981 in Dnipropetrovsk) is a Ukrainian judoka, who competed in the men's heavyweight category. He held two Ukrainian titles in both his own division and the open event, picked up a bronze medal at the 2007 Summer Universiade in Bangkok, Thailand, and represented his nation Ukraine at the 2004 Summer Olympics.

Polyanskyy was selected to the Ukrainian squad in the men's heavyweight class (+100 kg) at the 2004 Summer Olympics in Athens, as a result of the nation's top nine finish in the European Judo Union ranking list. Polyanskyy opened his match with a brilliant ippon victory and an ōuchi gari (big inner reap) over Egypt's Islam El Shehaby, before he fell in his next bout with a waza-ari awasete ippon defeat to Italy's Paolo Bianchessi. With Bianchessi moving forward to the medal podium phase, Polyanskyy gave himself a chance for an Olympic bronze medal through the repechage round, but lost to South Korea's Kim Sung-bum by an ippon and a tani otoshi (valley drop) within a halfway time into their first playoff of the draft.
