= Sergio Camacho =

Colombian Olympic judoka

Personal information
- Full name: Sergio Andrés Camacho
- Nationality: Colombia
- Born: 14 March 1973 (age 53) Caracas, Venezuela
- Height: 1.85 m (6 ft 1 in)
- Weight: 110 kg (243 lb)

Sport
- Sport: Judo
- Event: +100 kg

Sergio Andrés Camacho (born March 14, 1973, in Caracas, Venezuela) is a Venezuelan-born Colombian judoka, who competed in the men's heavyweight category. Holding a dual citizenship, he captured a 2001 South American senior title for his own division, and had an opportunity to represent his naturalized nation Colombia at the 2004 Summer Olympics.

Camacho qualified for his naturalized Colombian squad in the men's heavyweight class (+100 kg) at the 2004 Summer Olympics in Athens, by placing fifth and receiving a berth from the Pan American Championships in Margarita Island, Venezuela. He fell short in a thirteen-second, earth-shattering ippon and an uchi mata (inner thigh) throw to naturalized Australian judoka and Olympic veteran Semir Pepic during their opening match.
