= Majid Al-Ali =

Kuwaiti judoka

Personal information
- Full name: Majid Mohamed Al-Ali Sultan
- Nationality: Kuwait
- Born: 29 September 1987 (age 38) Kuwait City, Kuwait
- Height: 1.82 m (5 ft 11 1/2 in)
- Weight: 106 kg (234 lb)

Sport
- Sport: Judo
- Event: +100 kg

Majid Mohamed Al-Ali Sultan (Arabic: ماجد محمد العلي سلطان; born September 29, 1987, in Kuwait City is a Kuwaiti judoka, who competed in the men's heavyweight category. He achieved a fifth-place finish as a 14-year-old teen in the over-100 kg division at the 2002 Asian Games in Busan, South Korea, and also represented his nation Kuwait at the 2004 Summer Olympics.

Al-Ali qualified as a lone judoka for the Kuwaiti squad in the men's heavyweight class (+100 kg) at the 2004 Summer Olympics in Athens, by granting a tripartite invitation from the International Judo Federation. He lost his opening match to U.S. judoka and two-time Olympian Martin Boonzaayer, who successfully scored an ippon, and gripped him with a tate shiho gatame (vertical four-quarter) hold at two minutes and twenty-one seconds.
