= Valentin Ruslyakov =

Ukrainian judoka (born 1972)

Personal information
- Nationality: Ukraine
- Born: 3 February 1972 (age 54) Donetsk Oblast, Ukrainian SSR, Soviet Union
- Occupation: Judoka

Sport
- Sport: Judo
Medal record
Men's judo
Representing Ukraine
Summer Universiade
Bronze medal – third place	1999 Palma de Mallorca	Team

Profile at external databases
- JudoInside.com: 485

Valentin Ruslyakov (born 3 February 1972), also sometimes spelled Valentyn Rusliakov, is a Ukrainian judoka. He represented Ukraine at the 2000 Summer Olympics competing in the men's heavyweight category.

== Achievements ==
Year	Tournament	Place	Weight class
2000	European Judo Championships	7th	Heavyweight (+100 kg)
