= Igor Peshkov =

Kazakhstani judoka (born 1965)

Personal information
- Nationality: Kazakhstani
- Born: 7 January 1965 (age 61)

Sport
- Sport: Judo
Medal record
Representing Kazakhstan
Men's judo
Asian Judo Championships
Silver medal – second place	1993 Macao	95 kg

Igor Peshkov (Игорь Николаевич Пешков, born 7 January 1965) is a Kazakhstani judoka. He competed in the men's heavyweight event at the 1996 Summer Olympics.
