= Valentin Bazon =

Romanian judoka

Personal information
- Nationality: Romanian
- Born: 13 January 1963 (age 62); Bucharest, Romania
- Occupation: Judoka

Sport
- Sport: Judo

Profile at external databases
- IJF: 53607
- JudoInside.com: 6816

Valentin Bazon (born 13 January 1963) is a Romanian judoka. He competed in the men's heavyweight event at the 1992 Summer Olympics.
