= Cawas Billimoria =

Indian judoka (born 1962)

Personal information
- Nationality: Indian
- Born: 25 October 1962 (age 63) Mumbai, India
- Occupation: Judoka

Sport
- Sport: Judo

Profile at external databases
- JudoInside.com: 10671

Cawas Billimoria (born 25 October 1962) is an Indian judoka. He is a Parsi Zoroastrian. He competed in the men's heavyweight event at the 1992 Summer Olympics. He has been called "a name synonymous with the sport of judo," and "the man who built Indian judo."

In 2001, Billamoria received death threats, but it took 16 years for the perpetrators to be brought to trial, and he could not identify them, so they were acquitted.
