= Miklós Szabó (judoka) =

Australian judoka

Personal information
- Nationality: Australian
- Born: 21 December 1955 (age 69); Szeged, Hungary

Sport
- Sport: Judo

Miklós Szabó (born 21 December 1955) is an Australian judoka. He competed in the men's heavyweight event at the 1996 Summer Olympics.
