= Donald Obwoge =

Kenyan judoka

Personal information
- Nationality: Kenyan

Sport
- Sport: Judo

Donald Obwoge is a Kenyan judoka. He competed in the men's heavyweight event at the 1992 Summer Olympics.
