= Luis Alonso Morán =

Honduran Olympic judoka

Luis Alonso Morán (Athlete)
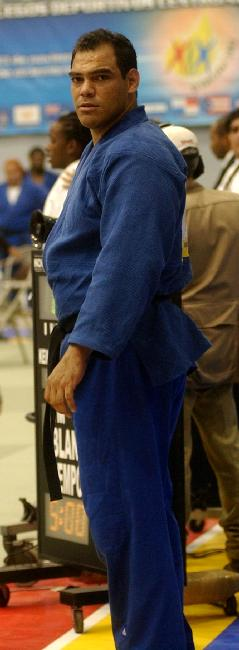

Personal information
- Full name: Luis Alonso Morán Servellón
- Nickname: El Oso
- Nationality: Honduras
- Born: 4 August 1971 (age 55) Tegucigalpa, Honduras
- Height: 1.95 m (6 ft 5 in)
- Weight: 125 kg (276 lb)

Sport
- Sport: Judo
- Event: +100 kg

Luis Alonso Morán Servellón (born 4 August 1971 in Tegucigalpa) is a Honduran judoka, who competed in the men's heavyweight category. He picked up a silver medal in the over+100 kg division at the 2006 Central American and Caribbean Games in Cartagena, Colombia, and also represented his nation Honduras at the 2004 Summer Olympics.

Moran was the only Judo athlete from Central America to qualify the men's heavyweight class (+100 kg) at the 2004 Summer Olympics in Athens, from the International Judo Federation. He lost his opening match to Dutch judoka and eventual bronze medalist Dennis van der Geest, who successfully scored an ippon, and tightly wrapped him with a soto makikomi (outer wraparound) hold at one minute and fifty-three seconds.

== Sporting career ==
- He started practicing Judo at a very adult age, at 29 years old. Before Judo he had already been selected nationally in Basketball, Handball and Track and field. In track and field he still holds the record of Sub-19 "Shot Put" for Honduras and Central American,
- Central American Champion undefeated for 5 years,
- Bronze medal in the Central American and Caribbean Games in San Salvador 2002 Medallas de Hondureños en Juegos Centro Americanos y del Caribe,
- Bronze medal in Pan-American Championship, Isla Margarita, Venezuela 2003
- First judoka of Honduras to go to some Olympic games through the direct classification and not by invitation 2004 Summer Olympics,
- He was number 16th in +100Kg division in the world ranking of the IJF in 2004,
- Silver Medal in 2006 Central American and Caribbean Games. Moran lost the gold medal against Cuban Oscar Bryson due to a serious injury to his right knee. At that time Bryson was the world champion of the division of + 100Kg,
- Gold medalist in the XIII Central American Games 2007,
- President of the Honduran Judo Federation (FENAJUDOH) from 2008 to the present,
- In 2012 he received from CONDEPAH the "QUIJOTE DEL DEPORTE" for his career and support as a leader in the judo federation of Honduras (FENAJUDOH) Condepah nombra los Quijotes 2012]
- Their results are part of the Honduran Olympic Sports Fame Museum, located at the Olimpico Hotel in Tegucigalpa, Honduras,
- He had to retire from Judo because of two strong injuries on both knees, where he had cruciate ligament damage,
- Currently, he is the main promoter and sponsor of the international Judo Cup "MEGATK", where clubs from all of Central America participate, but it is an open world player.
- Luis Moran owns the Judo Megatk club. The Megatk club was champion in the years 2011,2012, 2013, 2014 and 2016
- Luis Moran is the first Honduran to be rewarded by the Japanese government in development work and transmit Japanese culture in Hondurans Luis morán es galardonado por el gobierno de Japón
- Luis Moran es condecorado con "Orden del Sol Naciente, Rayos de Oro y Plata" otorgada por parte del Emperador del Japón Naruhito.
- Luis Moran elected president of the National Judo Federation of Honduras for the period 2025-2029
- I succeeded in implementing judo as a self-defense martial art in the Honduran special forces. COPE AND COBRAS
