= Ho Yen Chye =

Singaporean judoka (1966–2021)

Personal information
- Nationality: Singaporean
- Born: 2 December 1966
- Died: 12 April 2021 (aged 54) Jakarta, Indonesia

Sport
- Sport: Judo
Medal record
Men's judo
Representing Singapore
SEA Games
Gold medal – first place	1987 Jakarta	Open

Ho Yen Chye (2 December 1966 – 12 April 2021) was a Singaporean judoka. He competed in the men's heavyweight event at the 1992 Summer Olympics. Ho won one gold, five silver, and one bronze medal from his participation in the SEA Games between 1983 and 1991. His only gold medal came at the 1987 SEA Games in Indonesia, where he won the open category.

Ho died on 12 April 2021 in Jakarta due to heart failure.
