= José Mario Tranquillini =

Brazilian judoka (born 1962)

Personal information
- Born: 23 October 1962 (age 63) Brasília, Brazil

Sport
- Sport: Judo
Medal record
Representing Brazil
Pan American Games
Gold medal – first place	1995 Mar del Plata	Heavyweight

José Mario Nery Tranquillini (born 23 October 1962) is a Brazilian judoka. He competed in the men's heavyweight event at the 1992 Summer Olympics.
