= Arnulfo Betancourt =

Nicaraguan judoka

Personal information
- Nationality: Nicaraguan
- Born: 20 April 1972 (age 52)

Sport
- Sport: Judo

Arnulfo Betancourt (born 20 April 1972) is a Nicaraguan judoka. He competed in the men's heavyweight event at the 1996 Summer Olympics.
