= Dame Stoykov =

Bulgarian judoka

Personal information
- Native name: Даме Иванов Стойков
- Full name: Dame Ivanov Stoykov
- Born: 11 July 1966 (age 58); Gotse Delchev, Bulgaria

Sport
- Country: Bulgaria
- Sport: Judo

Dame Ivanov Stoykov (Bulgarian: Даме Иванов Стойков, born 11 July 1966), also known as Dame Stoykov (Даме Стойков), is a Bulgarian judoka. He competed in the men's heavyweight event at the 1992 Summer Olympics.

== Achievements ==
Year	Tournament	Place	Weight class
1989	European Judo Championships	7th	Heavyweight (+95 kg)
1989	European Judo Championships	7th	Open class
