= Shinichi Shinohara =

Japanese judoka (born 1973)

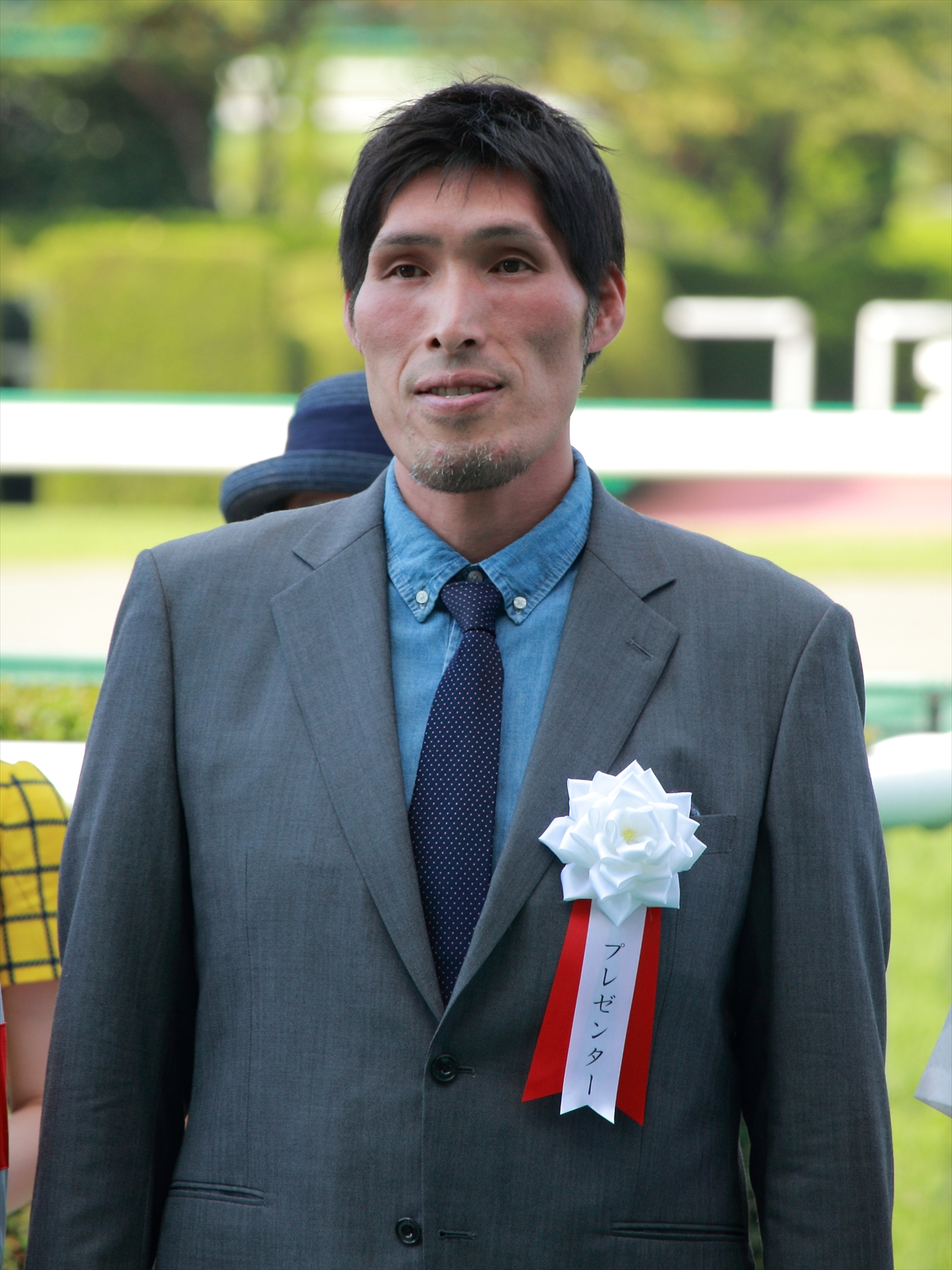
- Shinichi Shinohara in 2015

Personal information
- Born: 23 January 1973 (age 53)
- Occupation: Judoka

Sport
- Country: Japan
- Sport: Judo
- Weight class: +100 kg

Achievements and titles
- Olympic Games: (silver) (2000)
- World Champ.: (gold) (1999, 1999)
- Asian Champ.: (gold) (1995, 1995, 1998)
Medal record
Men's judo
Representing Japan
Olympic Games
Silver medal – second place	2000 Sydney	+100 kg
World Championships
Gold medal – first place	1999 Birmingham	+100 kg
Gold medal – first place	1999 Birmingham	Open
Silver medal – second place	1997 Paris	+95 kg
Bronze medal – third place	1995 Chiba	Open
Bronze medal – third place	2001 Munich	+100 kg
Asian Games
Gold medal – first place	1998 Bangkok	+100 kg
Asian Championships
Gold medal – first place	1995 New Delhi	+95 kg
Gold medal – first place	1995 New Delhi	Open
East Asian Games
Gold medal – first place	1997 Busan	+95 kg

Profile at external databases
- IJF: 187
- JudoInside.com: 1045
- Updated on 1 June 2023

Shinichi Shinohara (篠原 信一, Shinohara Shin'ichi; born 23 January 1973 in Kobe, Japan) is a Japanese television personality, judoka and winner of two gold medals at the 1999 World Championships in Birmingham.

== Career ==
To Shinohara's disappointment, French champion David Douillet did not compete at Birmingham due to back injury; Shinohara was quoted as saying, "Even though I lifted the double crown at the worlds, it won't mean anything as long as people say it was won in Douillet's absence." Douillet had previously been declared victor at the 1997 championships in Paris after a French judge gave Shinohara a controversial penalty.

Three years after, Shinohara received the silver medal at the 2000 Summer Olympics when he was defeated by Douillet due to another disputed judgment about Uchi Mata Sukashi in the finals which was strongly protested by the Japanese participants. Douillet performed Uchi Mata but over-rotated and landed on his back; Shinohara fell to the mat as well. One judge had ruled for Shinohara, while the other two ruled for Douillet. Shinohara cried throughout the medal ceremony as a result of his loss, while head coach and 1984 Olympic champion Yasuhiro Yamashita harshly criticised the judges and apologized to Shinohara for his powerlessness after the ceremony. However, at a later press conference, Shinohara expressed that he was not dissatisfied with the judgment, stating, "I lost because I was weak. Douillet was strong."

As of 2007, Shinohara coaches judo at his alma mater, Tenri University, where he previously studied as an undergraduate. Among his students is Asian champion Takamasa Anai.

Shinohara portrayed himself in the 2016 game Yakuza Kiwami, serving as a potential opponent for protagonist Kazuma Kiryu.
