= Dennis Raven =

Dutch judoka

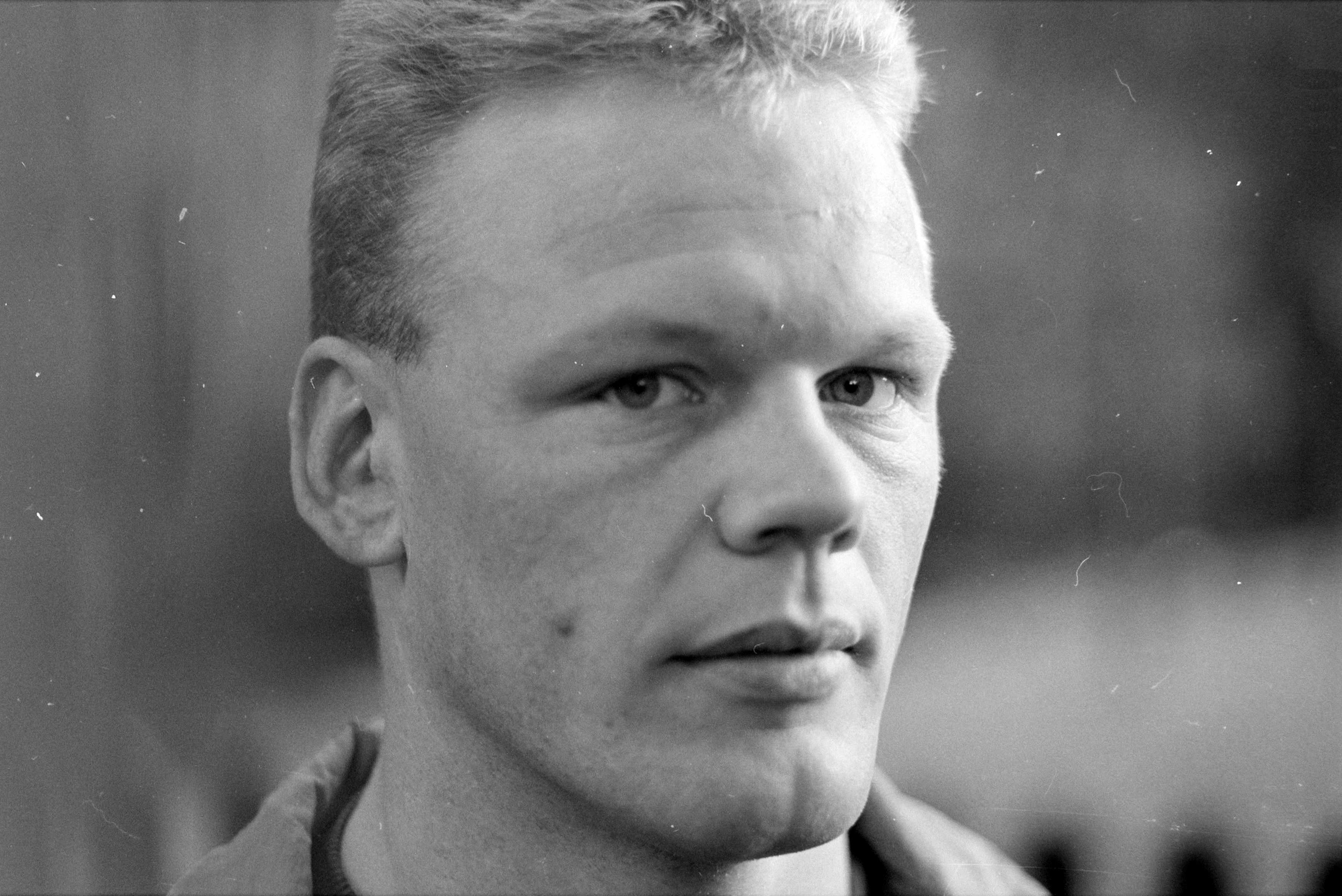
- Dennis Raven, 1991

Personal information
- Nationality: Dutch
- Born: 26 November 1967 (age 57); Zaandam, Netherlands
- Occupation: Judoka

Sport
- Sport: Judo

Profile at external databases
- JudoInside.com: 1621

Dennis Raven (born 26 November 1967) is a Dutch judoka. He competed in the men's heavyweight event at the 1992 Summer Olympics.
