= Sunith Thakur =

Indian judoka

Personal information
- Nationality: Indian
- Born: Sunith Thakur; 10 September 1970 (age 55)
- Spouse: Narender Singh

Sport
- Country: India
- Sport: Judo
Medal record
Women's Judo
Asian Judo Championships
Bronze medal – third place	1995 New Delhi	62 kg

Sunith Thakur (born 10 September 1970) is an Indian former female judoka. She represented India at the 1996 Summer Olympics, where she competed in the Women's half lightweight event. Thakur also won a bronze medal in the 1995 Asian Judo Championships.

She was married to a fellow Indian judoka, Narender Singh, who also represented India in both the 1992 Summer Olympics and the 1996 Summer Olympics.
