= Eric Krieger =

Austrian judoka

Personal information
- Nationality: Austria
- Citizenship: Austria
- Born: 6 March 1975 (age 51)
- Occupation: Judoka

Sport
- Country: Austria
- Sport: Judo

Profile at external databases
- IJF: 53451
- JudoInside.com: 506

Eric Krieger (born 6 March 1975) is an Austrian judoka who reached the quarter-final at the 1996 Olympic Games.

== Achievements ==
| Year | Tournament | Place | Weight class |
|---|---|---|---|
| 1999 | European Judo Championships | 7th | Heavyweight (+100 kg) |
