= Stefano Venturelli =

Italian judoka (born 1967)

Personal information
- Nationality: Italian
- Born: 21 October 1967 (age 58) Milan, Italy

Sport
- Sport: Judo
Medal record
Representing Italy
Mediterranean Games
Bronze medal – third place	1987 Latakia	Open
Bronze medal – third place	1991 Athens	+95 kg

Stefano Venturelli (born 21 October 1967) is an Italian judoka. He competed at the 1988 Summer Olympics and the 1992 Summer Olympics.
