= Vyacheslav Berduta =

Kazakhstani judoka (born 1970)

Personal information
- Nationality: Kazakhstani
- Born: 3 February 1975 (age 51) Karazhal, Kazakh SSR, Soviet Union
- Occupation: Judoka

Sport
- Sport: Judo
Medal record
Representing Kazakhstan
Men's judo
East Asian Games
Bronze medal – third place	2001 Osaka	+100 kg
Asian Games
Bronze medal – third place	2002 Busan	+100 kg
Asian Championships
Silver medal – second place	2000 Osaka	+100 kg
Bronze medal – third place	1997 Manila	+95 kg
Bronze medal – third place	1999 Wenzhou	+100 kg
Bronze medal – third place	2005 Tashkent	Openweight

Profile at external databases
- JudoInside.com: 7994

Vyacheslav Berduta (Вячеслав Владимирович Бердута, born 3 February 1975) is a Kazakhstani judoka. He competed in the men's heavyweight event at the 2000 Summer Olympics.
