= Indrek Pertelson =

Estonian judoka (born 1971)

Personal information
- Born: 21 April 1971 (age 55) Tallinn, then part of Estonian SSR, Soviet Union
- Occupation: Judoka

Sport
- Country: Estonia
- Sport: Judo
- Weight class: +100 kg

Achievements and titles
- Olympic Games: (bronze) (2000, 2004)
- World Champ.: (silver) (1999, 2003)
- European Champ.: (gold) (1996)
Medal record
Men's judo
Representing Estonia
Olympic Games
Bronze medal – third place	2000 Sydney	+100 kg
Bronze medal – third place	2004 Athens	+100 kg
World Championships
Silver medal – second place	1999 Birmingham	+100 kg
Silver medal – second place	2003 Osaka	Open
European Championships
Gold medal – first place	1996 The Hague	Open
Silver medal – second place	2004 Bucharest	+100 kg
Bronze medal – third place	1997 Oostende	Open
Bronze medal – third place	1998 Oviedo	Open
Bronze medal – third place	1999 Bratislava	+100 kg
World Juniors Championships
Bronze medal – third place	1990 Dijon	‍–‍95 kg
European Junior Championships
Gold medal – first place	1990 Ankara	‍–‍95 kg
Gold medal – first place	1991 Pieksämäki	‍–‍95 kg

Profile at external databases
- IJF: 53053
- JudoInside.com: 333
- Updated on 30 May 2023

Indrek Pertelson (born 21 April 1971) is an Estonian former international judoka. At the 2000 and 2004 Summer Olympics he won bronze medals in the men's Heavyweight (+100 kg) category. He has won the gold medal in the 1996 European Judo Championships in the Open class. Pertelson was born in Tallinn.
