= Pitak Kampita =

Thai judoka

Personal information
- Nationality: Thai
- Born: 12 February 1971 (age 54)

Sport
- Sport: Judo

Pitak Kampita (born 12 February 1971) is a Thai judoka. He competed in the men's heavyweight event at the 1996 Summer Olympics.
