= Atif Muhammad Hussain =

Egyptian judoka

Personal information
- Nationality: Egyptian
- Born: 29 June 1960 (age 65)

Sport
- Sport: Judo

Atif Muhammad Hussain (born 29 June 1960) is an Egyptian judoka. He competed in the men's middleweight event at the 1984 Summer Olympics, representing Egypt. He later competed at the 1992 Summer Olympics, representing Guam.
