= Aythami Ruano =

Spanish judoka

Personal information
- Full name: Aythami Ruano Vega
- Born: 18 June 1977 (age 49) Las Palmas de Gran Canaria, Spain
- Occupation: Judoka
- Height: 198 cm (6 ft 6 in)
- Weight: 190 kg (419 lb)

Sport
- Sport: Judo
- Weight class: +100 kg
Medal record
Men's judo
Representing Spain
European Championships
Gold medal – first place	2000 Wroclaw	Open
Silver medal – second place	2003 Düsseldorf	+100 kg

Profile at external databases
- JudoInside.com: 634

Aythami Ruano Vega (Note: In this Spanish name, the first or paternal surname is Ruano and the second or maternal family name is Vega.) (also spelled Aytami, born 18 June 1977) is a Spanish judoka. He earned medals at the European Judo Championships, gold in 2000 and silver in 2003. After competing in the men's +100 kg event for Spain at the 2004 Summer Olympics, he retired from judo and took up Canarian wrestling.

== Achievements ==
Year	Tournament	Place	Weight class
2003	European Judo Championships	2nd	Heavyweight (+100 kg)
2002	European Judo Championships	5th	Open class
2001	World Judo Championships	7th	Heavyweight (+100 kg)
2000	European Judo Championships	1st	Open class
1998	European Judo Championships	5th	Open class
