= Liu Shenggang =

Chinese judoka (born 1976)

Personal information
- Nationality: Chinese
- Born: 15 November 1976 (age 50)
- Occupation: Judoka

Sport
- Sport: Judo

Profile at external databases
- JudoInside.com: 910

Liu Shenggang (born 15 November 1976) is a Chinese judoka. He competed in the men's heavyweight event at the 1996 Summer Olympics.
