= Bianca van der Velden =

Dutch synchronized swimmer

Personal information
- Born: 11 February 1976 (age 50) Nijmegen, Netherlands

Sport
- Sport: Synchronised swimming

Bianca van der Velden (born 11 February 1976 in Nijmegen) is a Dutch competitor in synchronized swimming in which she forms a duet with her twin sister Sonja.

Bianca and Sonja took part in the 2004 Summer Olympics in Athens where they finished in 13th position. At the 2005 World Championships in Montreal they became 9th, while Bianca also finished 9th in the solo routine there. At the 2007 World Championships in Melbourne they finished 9th in the technical routine and 10th in the free routine. They also qualified themselves for the 2008 Summer Olympics in Beijing.
