= Narender Singh (judoka) =

Indian judoka

Personal information
- Nationality: Indian
- Born: Narender Singh Kodan; 28 May 1969 Delhi, India
- Died: 5 February 2016 (aged 46) Jalandhar, India
- Occupation: Judoka
- Spouse: Sunith Thakur

Sport
- Country: India
- Sport: Judo
Medal record
Men's Judo
Representing India
Commonwealth Games
Bronze medal – third place	1990 Auckland	60 kg

Profile at external databases
- JudoInside.com: 2750

Narender Singh Kodan (28 May 1969 – 5 February 2016) was an Indian judoka who competed at two Olympic Games.

== Biography ==
Singh, who was born in Delhi, won his first national championship in 1985. He represented his country for the first time at the 1989 South Asian Games and won a gold medal. In the 1990 Commonwealth Games in Auckland he was the joint bronze medallist in the Extra Lightweight division. He is the first judoka to have represented India twice at the Summer Olympic Games. At his first appearance in Barcelona in 1992, he was eliminated in the first round of competition by Egypt's Ahmed El Sayed. In 1996 he was one of four men who had to play a qualifying match in order to reduce the field to the required 32 judoka, which he won over Ireland's Sean Sullivan. He then lost in the round of 32, held at the Georgia World Congress Center in Atlanta, to Natik Bagirov from Belarus.

In 1999, he was the only Indian judoka to be featured in the Arjuna Awards.

Singh was a member of the Punjab Police, but he was suspended from his duties in 2013 on suspicion of attempted murder. The incident occurred when Singh got into an altercation with a youth over parking and discharged his firearm.

He committed suicide at his residence on 5 February 2016. His wife, former Indian Olympian Sunith Thakur, found him hanging by a wire from a ceiling fan. Since being suspended by the Punjab Police he had been reportedly suffering from depression. His friend, Punjab MLA Pargat Singh, was quoted as saying "It is the failure of the department that cost the life of an acclaimed sportsperson. Despite being on suspension for over two years, no senior officer considered his plea for reinstatement. When Narinder failed in his attempts, he opted to end his life. It is shameful".
