= Saidakhtam Rakhimov =

Tajikistani judoka

Personal information
- Nationality: Tajikistani
- Born: 28 June 1973 (age 53)

Sport
- Sport: Judo
Medal record
Representing Tajikistan
Men's judo
Asian Championships
Bronze medal – third place	1995 New Delhi	+95 kg

Saidakhtam Rakhimov (born 28 June 1973) is a Tajikistani judoka. He competed in the men's heavyweight event at the 1996 Summer Olympics.
