= Igor Muller =

Luxembourgish judoka

Personal information
- Born: 1 November 1967 (age 57)
- Occupation: Judoka

Sport
- Sport: Judo

Profile at external databases
- JudoInside.com: 3087

Igor Muller (also spelled Müller or Mueller, born 1 November 1967) is a Luxembourgish judoka. He competed at the 1992 Summer Olympics and the 1996 Summer Olympics.

== Achievements ==
Year	Tournament	Place	Weight class
1996	European Judo Championships	7th	Heavyweight (+95 kg)
1996	European Judo Championships	7th	Open class
1995	European Judo Championships	7th	Heavyweight (+95 kg)
1995	European Judo Championships	7th	Open class
1995	World Judo Championships	5th	Open class
1994	European Judo Championships	5th	Heavyweight (+95 kg)
1993	European Judo Championships	5th	Heavyweight (+95 kg)
1991	World Judo Championships	5th	Heavyweight (+95 kg)
