= Gabriel Munteanu =

Romanian judoka

Gabriel "Gabi" Munteanu (born 25 June 1973 in Poienești, Vaslui) is a Romanian judoka.

== Achievements ==
| Year | Tournament | Place | Weight class |
|---|---|---|---|
| 2003 | World Judo Championships | 5th | Open class |
| 2003 | European Judo Championships | 5th | Heavyweight (+100 kg) |
| 2001 | European Judo Championships | 7th | Heavyweight (+100 kg) |
| 2001 | European Judo Championships | 7th | Open class |
| 2000 | European Judo Championships | 5th | Heavyweight (+100 kg) |
| 2000 | European Judo Championships | 7th | Open class |
| 1993 | European Judo Championships | 7th | Heavyweight (+95 kg) |
