= Damon Keeve =

American judoka

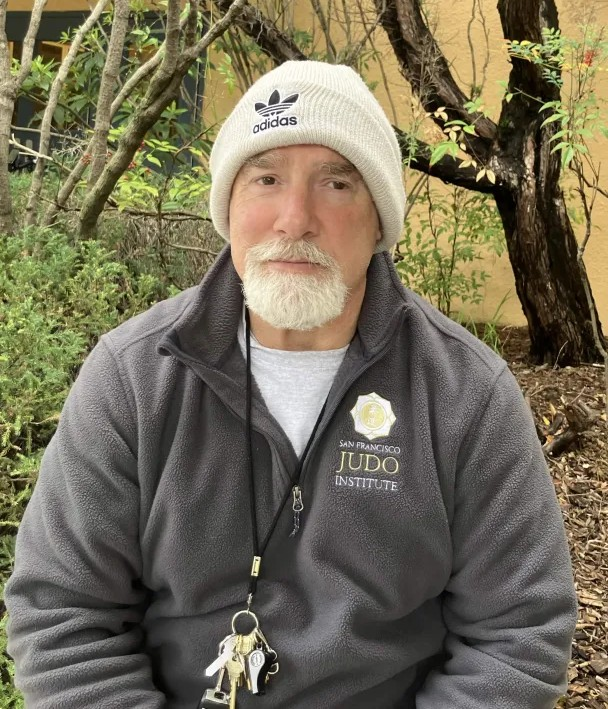
- Keeve in 2025

Personal information
- Nationality: United States
- Born: August 27, 1960 (age 66) San Francisco, California, U.S.

Sport
- Sport: Judoka
Medal record
Representing United States
Pan American Games
| Silver medal – second place | 1987 Indianapolis | Open class |
| Bronze medal – third place | 1995 Mar del Plata | Heavyweight |

Damon Keeve (born August 27, 1960) is a former US Judo team member. He competed in the 1992 and 1996 Summer Olympics.

Keeve was a police officer and former SWAT team member in San Francisco. In 2002, he was involved in a $75,000 lawsuit against the San Francisco Police Department for excessive force used on a prisoner in the Bayview police station. Keeve would work in physical education at various high schools, most notably Tamalpais High School before his retirement in 2025.
