= Mitar Milinković =

Serbian judoka

Personal information
- Nationality: Serbian
- Born: 29 December 1971 (age 54)

Sport
- Sport: Judo
Medal record
Representing Yugoslavia
Mediterranean Games
Bronze medal – third place	1991 Athens	+95 kg
Summer Universiade
Silver medal – second place	1995 Fukuoka	+95 kg

Mitar Milinković (Serbian Cyrillic: Митар Милинковић; born 29 December 1971) is a Serbian judoka. He competed at the 1992 Summer Olympics as an Independent Olympic Participant, and the 1996 Summer Olympics for FR Yugoslavia.
