= Imre Csősz =

Hungarian judoka (born 1969)

Personal information
- Born: 31 May 1969 (age 57)
- Occupation: Judoka

Sport
- Country: Hungary
- Sport: Judo
- Weight class: +95 kg, Open

Achievements and titles
- Olympic Games: (bronze) (1992)
- World Champ.: (bronze) (1991)
- European Champ.: (gold) (1995)
Medal record
Men's judo
Representing Hungary
Olympic Games
Bronze medal – third place	1992 Barcelona	+95 kg
World Championships
Bronze medal – third place	1991 Barcelona	Open
European Championships
Gold medal – first place	1995 Birmingham	Open
Bronze medal – third place	1998 Oviedo	+100 kg

Profile at external databases
- IJF: 23315
- JudoInside.com: 2690
- Updated on 5 June 2023

Imre Csősz (born 31 May 1969, in Debrecen) is a Hungarian judoka. He competed at three Olympic Games.

== Achievements ==
Year	Tournament	Place	Weight class
1998	European Judo Championships	3rd	Heavyweight (+100 kg)
1998	European Judo Championships	5th	Open class
1997	European Judo Championships	5th	Heavyweight (+95 kg)
1997	European Judo Championships	5th	Open class
1995	European Judo Championships	5th	Heavyweight (+95 kg)
1995	European Judo Championships	1st	Open class
1994	European Judo Championships	3rd	Heavyweight (+95 kg)
1994	European Judo Championships	5th	Open class
1993	World Judo Championships	7th	Heavyweight (+95 kg)
1993	World Judo Championships	5th	Open class
1992	Olympic Games	3rd	Heavyweight (+95 kg)
1990	European Judo Championships	7th	Heavyweight (+95 kg)
