= Frank Moreno =

Cuban judoka (born 1965)

Personal information
- Born: November 17, 1965 (age 60)
Medal record
Men's judo
Representing Cuba
Pan American Games
Gold medal – first place	1987 Indianapolis	Heavyweight
Gold medal – first place	1991 Havana	Heavyweight
Silver medal – second place	1995 Mar del Plata	Heavyweight

Frank Esteban Moreno García (born November 17, 1965, in Matanzas) is a retired Cuban judoka, who represented his native country twice at the Summer Olympics. He won several medals during his career at the Pan American Games in the Men's Heavyweight (+ 95 kg) division.
