= Semir Pepic =

Australian judoka

Medal record

Representing Slovakia

Men's judo

European Championships
Silver medal – second place	1999 Bratislava	+100 kg

Semir Pepic (born 25 September 1972 in Podgorica, Montenegro) is an Australian judoka. He formerly represented Slovakia. He has six Gold medals from the Australian National Judo Championships and has represented Australia in the Beijing 2008 Olympics.

== Achievements ==
Year	Tournament	Place	Weight class
2006	Oceanian Judo Championships	1st	Heavyweight (+100 kg)
2006	Oceanian Judo Championships	1st	Open class
2004	Oceanian Judo Championships	1st	Heavyweight (+100 kg)
1999	European Judo Championships	2nd	Heavyweight (+100 kg)
1999	European Judo Championships	5th	Open class
