= Harry Van Barneveld =

Belgian judoka (born 1967)

Personal information
- Born: 18 February 1967 (age 59)
- Occupation: Judoka

Sport
- Country: Belgium
- Sport: Judo
- Weight class: +95 kg, Open

Achievements and titles
- Olympic Games: (bronze) (1996)
- World Champ.: (bronze) (1997, 1999)
- European Champ.: (gold) (1997)
Medal record
Men's judo
Representing Belgium
Olympic Games
Bronze medal – third place	1996 Atlanta	+95 kg
World Championships
Bronze medal – third place	1997 Paris	Open
Bronze medal – third place	1999 Birmingham	Open
European Championships
Gold medal – first place	1997 Oostende	Open
Silver medal – second place	1990 Frankfurt	+95 kg
Silver medal – second place	1990 Frankfurt	Open
Silver medal – second place	1993 Athens	Open
Silver medal – second place	1994 Gdansk	Open
Silver medal – second place	1998 Oviedo	Open
Bronze medal – third place	1989 Helsinki	Open
Bronze medal – third place	1992 Paris	Open
Bronze medal – third place	1995 Birmingham	Open
Bronze medal – third place	1996 The Hague	Open
Bronze medal – third place	1997 Oostende	+95 kg

Profile at external databases
- IJF: 53229
- JudoInside.com: 144
- Updated on 4 June 2023

Harry Van Barneveld (Amsterdam, born 18 February 1967) is a Belgian former judoka. At the 1996 Summer Olympics in Atlanta he won a bronze medal in the heavyweight category. Van Barneveld considers his victory in the 1992 Jigoro Kano Cup his greatest victory, as this was a first for a non-Japanese judoka.
