= Ruslan Sharapov =

Belarusian judoka (born 1967)

Medal record

Men's judo

European Championships
Bronze medal – third place	2002 Maribor	Open

Ruslan Sharapov (born 22 June 1967) is a Belarusian judoka. He competed at the 1996 Summer Olympics and the 2000 Summer Olympics.

== Achievements ==
Year	Tournament	Place	Weight class
2002	European Judo Championships	3rd	Open class
2001	European Judo Championships	5th	Heavyweight (+100 kg)
2000	Olympic Games	5th	Heavyweight (+100 kg)
2000	European Judo Championships	5th	Heavyweight (+100 kg)
1999	European Judo Championships	5th	Heavyweight (+100 kg)
1995	World Judo Championships	7th	Heavyweight (+95 kg)
1994	European Judo Championships	7th	Heavyweight (+95 kg)
1993	European Judo Championships	5th	Heavyweight (+95 kg)
