= Paolo Bianchessi =

Italian judoka (born 1981)

Personal information
- Born: 17 January 1981 (age 45)
- Occupation: Judoka

Sport
- Country: Italy
- Sport: Judo
- Weight class: +100 kg

Achievements and titles
- Olympic Games: 5th (2004)
- World Champ.: 5th (2005)
- European Champ.: (silver) (2008)
Medal record
Men's judo
Representing Italy
European Championships
Silver medal – second place	2008 Lisbon	+100 kg
Bronze medal – third place	2003 Düsseldorf	+100 kg
IJF Grand Prix
Bronze medal – third place	2010 Rotterdam	+100 kg
World Juniors Championships
Silver medal – second place	2000 Nabeul	+100 kg
European Junior Championships
Silver medal – second place	1998 Bucharest	+100 kg
Silver medal – second place	2000 Nicosia	+100 kg

Profile at external databases
- IJF: 2611
- JudoInside.com: 420
- Updated on 17 February 2022

Paolo Bianchessi (born 17 January 1981) is an Italian judoka.

== Achievements ==
Year	Tournament	Place	Weight class
2008	European Championships	2nd	Heavyweight (+100 kg)
2005	World Judo Championships	5th	Heavyweight (+100 kg)
2005	Mediterranean Games	2nd	Heavyweight (+100 kg)
2004	Olympic Games	5th	Heavyweight (+100 kg)
2004	European Judo Championships	5th	Heavyweight (+100 kg)
2003	European Judo Championships	3rd	Heavyweight (+100 kg)
