= Charalampos Papaioannou =

Greek judoka

Personal information
- Born: 31 July 1971 (age 55)
- Occupation: Judoka

Sport
- Sport: Judo

Profile at external databases
- JudoInside.com: 2676

Charalampos Papaioannou (born January 4, 1971) is a Greek judoka.

== Achievements ==
Year	Tournament	Place	Weight class
2003	European Judo Championships	5th	Open class
1996	Olympic Games	7th	Heavyweight (+95 kg)
1994	European Judo Championships	7th	Open class
1993	Mediterranean Games	3rd	Heavyweight (+95 kg)
