= Martin Boonzaayer =

American judoka (born 1972)

Martin David Boonzaaijer (formerly Boonzaayer)
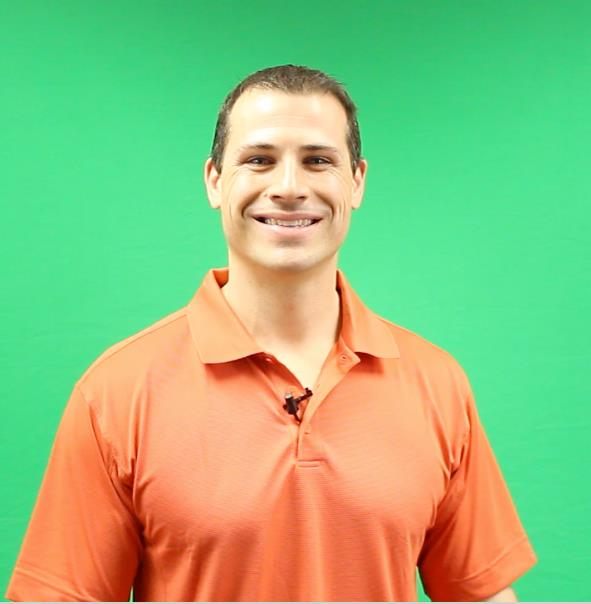

Personal information
- Full name: Martin David Boonzaaijer (formerly Boonzaayer)
- Born: November 1, 1972 (age 53) Kalamazoo, Michigan, U.S.
- Education: Arizona State University
- Occupation: CEO at The Trusted Home Buyer

Sport
- Sport: Judo
Medal record
Men's Judo
Representing the United States
Pan American Games
Bronze medal – third place	2003 Santo Domingo	Heavyweight

Profile at external databases
- JudoInside.com: 3573

Martin David Boonzaaijer (born November 1, 1972), formerly known as Martin Boonzaayer, is an American judoka. He was a member of the United States of America Judo team at the 2000 and 2004 Olympics. He was a three-time World Team Member, Seven-time National Champion, and won Bronze at the 2003 Pan American Games. He also won ninth place in the 1999 World Championships as well as a two time Gold medalist at the US International Invitational (US Open) Championships, in addition to numerous other international podium finishes.

After retiring from competitive judo Boonzaayer, opened his own real estate business.

In 2024, Boonzaayer reverted to the original Dutch spelling of his surname, Boonzaaijer. The previous spelling, Boonzaayer, was an anglicized version used earlier in his career.

== See also ==
- World Fit
