= Mahmoud Miran =

Iranian judoka (born 1974)

Personal information
- Born: 25 February 1974 (age 52)
- Occupation: Judoka

Sport
- Sport: Judo
Medal record
Men's Judo
Representing Iran
World Championships
Bronze medal – third place	2001 Munich	+100 kg
Asian Games
Silver medal – second place	1994 Hiroshima	+95 kg
Silver medal – second place	1998 Bangkok	+100 kg
Silver medal – second place	2002 Busan	+100 kg
Silver medal – second place	2006 Doha	Open
Bronze medal – third place	2002 Busan	Open
Asian Championships
Gold medal – first place	1996 Ho Chi Minh City	+95 kg
Silver medal – second place	2000 Osaka	Open
Silver medal – second place	2007 Kuwait City	Open
Silver medal – second place	2008 Jeju City	Open
Bronze medal – third place	1993 Macau	+95 kg
Bronze medal – third place	1993 Macau	Open
Bronze medal – third place	1996 Ho Chi Minh City	Open
Bronze medal – third place	1999 Wenzhou	+100 kg
Bronze medal – third place	1999 Wenzhou	Open
Bronze medal – third place	2000 Osaka	+100 kg
Bronze medal – third place	2003 Jeju City	Open
Bronze medal – third place	2005 Tashkent	Open

Profile at external databases
- JudoInside.com: 2755

Mahmoud Reza Miran Fashandi (Persian: سید محمودرضا میران فشندی, born February 25, 1974) more known as Mahmoud Miran is an Iranian judoka.

He competed internationally for 15 years, winning several medals at the World Judo Championships, Asian Games, and Asian Judo Championships. He lost in the first round of 100 kg division during the 2000 Olympics in Sydney to Frank Möller of Germany. He finished in joint fifth place in the heavyweight (+100 kg) division at the 2004 Summer Olympics, having lost the bronze medal match to Dennis van der Geest of the Netherlands. Additionally, he was the Pahlevan of Iran four times between 1994 and 1998.
