= Dennis van der Geest =

Dutch judoka (born 1975)

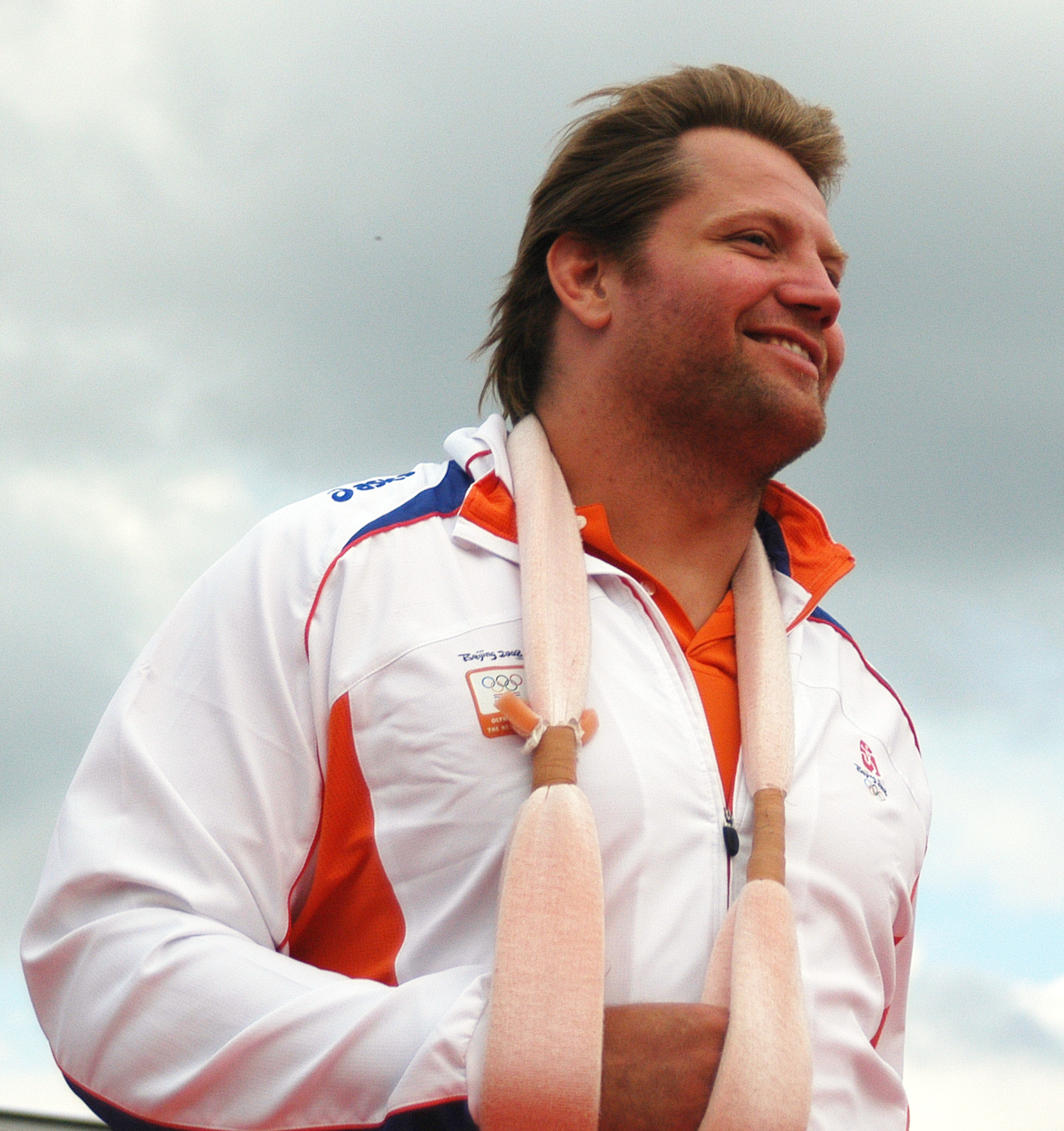

Personal information
- Born: 27 June 1975 (age 51)
- Occupation: Judoka
- Website: www.dennisvandergeest.nl

Sport
- Country: Netherlands
- Sport: Judo
- Weight class: +100 kg

Achievements and titles
- Olympic Games: (bronze) (2004)
- World Champ.: (gold) (2005)
- European Champ.: (gold) (2000, 2002)
Medal record
Men's judo
Representing the Netherlands
Olympic Games
Bronze medal – third place	2004 Athens	+100 kg
World Championships
Gold medal – first place	2005 Cairo	Open
Silver medal – second place	2003 Osaka	+100 kg
Bronze medal – third place	1997 Paris	Open
Bronze medal – third place	1999 Birmingham	Open
Bronze medal – third place	2001 Munich	Open
European Championships
Gold medal – first place	2000 Wrocław	+100 kg
Gold medal – first place	2002 Maribor	Open
Silver medal – second place	1997 Oostende	+95 kg
Silver medal – second place	2001 Paris	Open
Silver medal – second place	2003 Düsseldorf	Open
Bronze medal – third place	1998 Oviedo	Open
Bronze medal – third place	1999 Bratislava	Open
Bronze medal – third place	2002 Maribor	+100 kg
Bronze medal – third place	2004 Bucharest	+100 kg
Bronze medal – third place	2005 Rotterdam	+100 kg
European Junior Championships
Silver medal – second place	1994 Lisbon	‍–‍95 kg
Bronze medal – third place	1995 Valladolid	+95 kg
Summer Universiade
Gold medal – first place	2001 Beijing	+100 kg
Silver medal – second place	1999 Palma de Mallorca	+100 kg

Profile at external databases
- IJF: 31776
- JudoInside.com: 35
- Updated on 30 May 2023

Dennis van der Geest (Dutch pronunciation: [ˈdɛnɪs fɑn dər ˈɣeːst]; born 27 June 1975) is a Dutch judoka, who won the bronze medal in the men's heavyweight (+100 kg) division at the 2004 Summer Olympics. He was born in Haarlem, North Holland.

In 2005, he became the world judo champion in the men's open division by defeating Russian Tamerlan Tmenov with ippon in the final. In 2000 and 2002, he became European Champion in the over 100 kg event. He won three bronze medals and one silver medal at previous world championships.

At the 2008 Summer Olympics, Van der Geest was eliminated in the first round by Tamerlan Tmenov. He sustained a minor fracture during the match when Tmenov fell on his arm, but he was able to finish the fight. Van der Geest planned to finish his Judo career after the 2008 Summer Olympics to pursue a career in the music industry, but after his unexpected defeat, he was quoted as considering entering the World Championship in 2009. However, on 7 May 2009 Dennis van der Geest announced his retirement from top sport, owing to his lack of motivation.

Outside his sport he was the ambassador of his favourite football team Feyenoord Rotterdam in the 2005–06 season. Next to that, he released his first single, "To The Sunshine", on 8 August 2008. This track was released under his stage name of Ippon, and is a collaboration with producer Ronald Molendijk.

His younger brother Elco is also a judoka competing at the highest level.

In 2011 and 2013 he appeared in episodes of the television game show De Jongens tegen de Meisjes.

In 2019, he played a role in the film Brugklas: De tijd van m'n leven. He was a contestant in a 2020 episode of the television show Top 4000 Muziekquiz. He was one of the presenters of the 2021 show Missions Impossible in which people attempt to complete a challenge. Leo Alkemade, Hélène Hendriks and Jan Versteegh were also presenters of the show.

In 2025, he presented Bureau Onrecht, a television series about injustice. He renewed his contract with Talpa Network in January 2026.
