= Egypt at the 1996 Summer Olympics =

- IOC code: EGY
- NOC: Egyptian Olympic Committee
- Website: www.egyptianolympic.org (in Arabic and English)

in Atlanta
- Competitors: 29 in 8 sports
- Flag bearer: Hosam Abdallah
- Medals: Gold 0 Silver 0 Bronze 0 Total 0

Summer Olympics appearances (overview)
- 1912; 1920; 1924; 1928; 1932; 1936; 1948; 1952; 1956; 1960–1964; 1968; 1972; 1976; 1980; 1984; 1988; 1992; 1996; 2000; 2004; 2008; 2012; 2016; 2020; 2024; 2028

Other related appearances
- 1906 Intercalated Games –––– United Arab Republic (1960, 1964)

Egypt, which is represented by the Egyptian Olympic Committee (EOC), competed at the 1996 Summer Olympics in Atlanta, United States from July 19 to August 4, 1996. Twenty-nine Egyptian athletes, twenty-seven men and two women, competed in boxing, handball, judo, rowing, shooting, swimming, weightlifting, and wrestling. The nation did not win any medals at this edition of the Summer Games.

== Background ==
Prior to 1996, Egypt had sent athletes to fifteen editions of the Summer Olympic Games (three times as the United Arab Republic), the 1906 Intercalated Games, equestrian at the 1956 Summer Olympics, and the 1984 Winter Olympics. (Note: The 1912 Olympic report lists Egypt as having sent a fencer to those Games, but there is uncertainty as to whether he actually competed.) Egypt's 1996 delegation was the smallest since 1976 and chose Hosam Abdallah, an Olympic veteran in handball, as its flagbearer in the opening ceremony.

== Competitors ==
The following lists the number of Egyptian competitors in the various sporting events at the 1996 Games.

Sport	Men	Women	Total
Boxing	4	–	4
Handball	16	0	16
Judo	1	1	2
Rowing	1	0	1
Shooting	2	0	2
Swimming	1	1	2
Weightlifting	1	–	1
Wrestling	1	–	1
Total	27	2	29

== Results by event ==
=== Boxing ===
Egypt qualified four boxers for the Olympic tournament. Three of them, middleweight Kabary Salem, light-heavyweight Mohamed Mahmoud, and heavyweight Amrou Moustafa had placed fifth at the 1995 World Amateur Boxing Championships. Salim had also been the light-middleweight champion at the 1991 Mediterranean Games and had competed in that category in the 1992 Olympic tournament. All three were eliminated in the first round. The fourth, super-heavyweight Ahmed El-Said, received a bye in the round of 32, and was defeated by René Monse of Germany in the round of 16.

Athlete	Event	Round of 32	Round of 16	Quarterfinal	Semifinal	Final
Athlete	Event	Opposition Result	Opposition Result	Opposition Result	Opposition Result	Opposition Result
Kabary Salem	Middleweight	Hernández (CUB); L 11-2	Did not advance			
Mohamed Mahmoud	Light-Heavyweight	Rojas (CUB); L 20-9	Did not advance			
Amrou Moustafa	Heavyweight	Kshinin (RUS); L 17-4	Did not advance			
Ahmed El-Said	Super-Heavyweight	bye	Monse (GER); L 12-9	Did not advance		

=== Handball ===
Egypt qualified for the men's handball tournament by placing sixth at the 1995 World Men's Handball Championship, at the time the highest-ever placement for a squad from Africa. They had also been the gold medalists at the 1995 All-Africa Games. Half of the Egyptians were veterans of the 1992 tournament: Hosam Abdallah, Ahmed El-Attar, Ashraf Mabrouk Awaad, Ahmed El-Awady, Ahmed Belal, Gohar Mohamed, Yasser Mahmoud, and Ayman Abdel Hamid Soliman. Abdallah also served as the Egyptian flagbearer in the opening ceremonies of the Games. In its first three matches, Egypt defeated Algeria 19-16, Brazil 31-20, and Germany 24-22, before losing to 25-20 to France and 20-19 to eventual silver medalists Spain, which caused them to be eliminated from the tournament. In the ranking round, the country was bested by Russia and thus finished in sixth.

Preliminary group B

Team	Pld	W	D	L	GF	GA	GD	Points
France	5	4	0	1	145	114	+31	8
Spain	5	4	0	1	114	97	+17	8
Egypt	5	3	0	2	113	103	+10	6
Germany	5	3	0	2	121	112	+9	6
Algeria	5	0	1	4	95	117	−22	1
Brazil	5	0	1	4	100	145	−45	1

24 July; 14:30	Egypt	19–16	Algeria

25 July; 19:00	Egypt	31–20	Brazil

27 July; 14:30	Egypt	24–22	Germany

29 July; 10:00	France	25–20	Egypt

31 July; 10:00	Spain	20–19	Egypt

5th place match

2 August; 19:00	Russia	29–26	Egypt

Team roster

No.	Pos.	Name	Date of birth (age)	Height	App.	Goals	Club
	B	Hosam Abdallah	8 September 1966 (aged 29)		5	4
	F	Sameh Abdel Waress	3 August 1971 (aged 24)		6	19
	F	Ayman El-Alfy	27 September 1974 (aged 21)	1.82 m	6	5	(Egypt) Port Said Club
	B	Ahmed Ali	10 January 1973 (aged 23)		6	2
	B	Ahmed El-Attar	13 April 1967 (aged 29)	2.02 m	5	25
	B	Ashraf Mabrouk Awaad	1 June 1972 (aged 24)	1.95 m	6	18	(Egypt) Al-Ahly
	GK	Ahmed El-Awady	3 January 1970 (aged 26)		2	0
	B	Ahmed Belal	12 March 1968 (aged 28)	1.90 m	5	8	(Egypt) El-Olympi
	P	Amro El-Geioushy	1 July 1971 (aged 25)		6	22	(Egypt) El-Olympi
	B	Saber Hussein	20 February 1974 (aged 22)	1.94 m	1	0	(Egypt) Al-Ahly
	F	Khaled Mahmoud	15 December 1969 (aged 26)	1.81 m	1	3
	B	Yasser Mahmoud	23 February 1964 (aged 32)		1	0
	P	Gohar Nabil	31 January 1973 (aged 23)	1.93 m	5	11	(Egypt) Al-Ahly
	GK	Mohamed Bakir El-Nakib	6 April 1974 (aged 22)	1.92 m	6	0	(Egypt) El-Olympi
	GK	Ayman Abdel Hamid Soliman	5 August 1966 (aged 29)		4	0
	F	Mahmoud Soliman	27 August 1972 (aged 23)		6	21

=== Judo ===
Egypt sent two judokas to the 1996 Olympic tournament. Bassel El Gharbawy, who competed in the half-heavyweight division, was the reigning African Champion and bronze medalist in the open division, as well as the 1994 Junior World bronze medalist. After receiving a bye in the round of 32, El Gharbawy was defeated by Raymond Stevens of Great Britain in the round of 16 and eliminated from the tournament. Heba Hefny, competing in the heavyweight category, was a veteran of the 1992 Olympic tournament, where she had lost her opening bout, and attended the 1996 Olympics as the runner-up in both the heavyweight and open classes at the 1996 African Judo Championships. She received a bye in the opening round and defeated Heidi Burnett of Australia in the quarterfinals to advance to the semifinals, where she was overcome by Beata Maksymowa of Poland. In the repechage, she lost against Christine Cicot of France, one of the upcoming bronze medalists.

Men

Athlete	Event	Preliminary	Round of 32	Round of 16	Quarterfinals	Semifinals	Repechage 1	Repechage 2	Repechage 3	Final / BM	
Athlete	Event	Opposition Result	Opposition Result	Opposition Result	Opposition Result	Opposition Result	Opposition Result	Opposition Result	Opposition Result	Opposition Result	Rank
Bassel El Gharbawy	−95 kg	—N/a	BYE	Stevens (GBR); L	Did not advance						

Women

Athlete	Event	Preliminary	Round of 32	Round of 16	Quarterfinals	Semifinals	Repechage 1	Repechage 2	Repechage 3	Final / BM	
Athlete	Event	Opposition Result	Opposition Result	Opposition Result	Opposition Result	Opposition Result	Opposition Result	Opposition Result	Opposition Result	Opposition Result	Rank
Heba Hefny	−72 kg	—N/a	—N/a	BYE	Burnett (AUS); W	Maksymowa (POL); L	Christine Cicot (FRA); L	Did not advance			

=== Rowing ===
Egypt entered a single rower, Ali Ibrahim, into the Olympic tournament. Ibrahim had begun his international career only a year prior and had competed exclusively in the single sculls, achieving one second-place finish at the 1995 World Rowing Cup and 17th at the 1995 World Rowing Championships. He was third in his heat in the opening round, but was second in his repechage heat, which qualified him for the semifinals, where he was fourth in his heat and missed qualifying for the "A" Final. In the "B" Final, he finished second, behind Rob Waddell, for an overall placement of eighth.

Men

Athlete(s)	Event	Heats		Repechage		Semifinals		Final	
Athlete(s)	Event	Time	Rank	Time	Rank	Time	Rank	Time	Rank
Ali Ibrahim	Single sculls	7:41.17	3	7:45.64	2 Q	7:22.43	4	6:52.11	8

=== Shooting ===
Egypt entered two shooters into the Olympic tournament, both in the skeet event. Mohamed Khorshed was a veteran of three prior Olympics, never placing higher than 33rd, but had been the gold medalist in the discipline at the 1995 All-Africa Games. He also earned gold at the 1993 African Shooting Championships and bronze at the 1995 edition. Mostafa Hamdy, meanwhile, had been fourth and seventh at the 1993 and 1995 African Shooting Championships respectively. Khorshed and Hamdy finished 45th and 47th respectively and failed to advance to the final.

Men

Athlete	Events	Qualification		Final		Rank
Athlete	Events	Score	Rank	Score	Rank	Rank
Mostafa Hamdy	Skeet	112	=49	Did not advance		=49
Mohamed Khorshed	Skeet	113	=45	Did not advance		=45

=== Swimming ===
Egypt was represented by two swimmers in the Olympic tournament. Tamer Zinhom had set national records in the 50 metre freestyle and butterfly events at the 1995 Egyptian Championships, but placed fifth in his heat and 47th overall in the 50 m freestyle event at the Games and failed to advance. He also competed in the 100 m freestyle and butterfly and was eliminated from both after finishing 47th and 46th overall respectively. Rania Elwani, a veteran of the 1992 Olympics, had won three gold medals at the 1995 All-Africa Games (in the 50, 100, and 200 metre freestyle races), in addition to silver in the 100 metre backstroke and butterfly events. She competed in the 50, 100, and 200 m freestyle events, but never advanced beyond the heats.

Men

Athletes	Events	Heat		Finals	
Athletes	Events	Time	Rank	Time	Rank
Tamer Zinhom	50 m freestyle	24.02	47	Did not advance	
Tamer Zinhom	100 m freestyle	52.16	47	Did not advance	
Tamer Zinhom	100 m butterfly	56.46	=46	Did not advance	

Women

Athletes	Events	Heat		Finals	
Athletes	Events	Time	Rank	Time	Rank
Rania Elwani	50 m freestyle	26.26	18	Did not advance	
Rania Elwani	100 m freestyle	56.89	19	Did not advance	
Rania Elwani	200 m freestyle	2:06.94	34	Did not advance	

=== Weightlifting ===
Egypt's sole representative in weightlifting was Tharwat Bendary, a veteran of two editions of the All-Africa Games and several World Weightlifting Championships. He competed in the 99 kg class, lifting 167.5 kg in the snatch and 205.0 kg in the clean and jerk for a total score of 372.5, which ranked him 11th in the tournament.

Athletes	Events	Snatch		Clean & jerk		Total	Rank
Athletes	Events	Result	Rank	Result	Rank	Total	Rank
Tharwat Bendary	-99 kg	167.5	=12	205	=10	372.5	11

=== Wrestling ===
Moustafa Ramada Hussain, Egypt's representative in wrestling, was the son of Mohamed Abdul Ramada Hussain, who competed at the Olympics in 1952, and the brother of Mohyeldin Ramada Hussain who had appeared at the Games in 1992. Moustafa was a veteran of the 1988 and 1992 tournaments, and competed in the Greco-Roman 90 kg division. He was defeated by Maik Bullmann of Germany, the eventual bronze medalist, in the opening round and bested Abdel Aziz Essafoui of Morocco in the first classification round before losing to Marek Švec of the Czech Republic and placing 14th overall.

Greco-Roman

Athlete	Event	Round 1	Round 2	Quarterfinal	Semifinal	Final	Repechage Round 1	Repechage Round 2	Repechage Round 3	Repechage Round 4	Repechage Round 5	Bronze medal Bout
Athlete	Event	Opposition Result	Opposition Result	Opposition Result	Opposition Result	Opposition Result	Opposition Result	Opposition Result	Opposition Result	Opposition Result	Opposition Result	Opposition Result
Moustafa Ramada Hussain	-90 kg	Bullmann (GER); L 3-0	did not advance				Essafoui (MAR); W 4-0	Švec (CZE); L 8-4	did not advance			
