= Boxing at the 1996 Summer Olympics – Light heavyweight =

Boxing competitions

Light heavyweight boxing at the Games of the XXVI Olympiad
- Venue: Alexander Memorial Coliseum
- Dates: 24 July – 4 August 1996
- Competitors: 31 from 31 nations

Medalists
| 1st place, gold medalist(s) | | Vassili Jirov | Kazakhstan |
| 2nd place, silver medalist(s) | | Seung-Bae Lee | South Korea |
| 3rd place, bronze medalist(s) | | Antonio Tarver | United States |
| 3rd place, bronze medalist(s) | | Thomas Ulrich | Germany |

The Light Heavyweight class in the boxing at the 1996 Summer Olympics competition was the third-heaviest class at the 1996 Summer Olympics in Atlanta, Georgia. The weight class was open for boxers weighing more than 81 kilograms. The competition in the Alexander Memorial Coliseum started on 1996-07-20 and ended on 1996-08-04.

== Medalists ==
| Gold | Vassili Jirov; Kazakhstan |
| Silver | Seung-Bae Lee; South Korea |
| Bronze | Antonio Tarver; United States |
| Bronze | Thomas Ulrich; Germany |

== Results ==
Round of 32
Dmitri Vybornov (RUS) | 2
Antonio Tarver (USA) | 5
Gabriel Hernández (DOM) | 11
Sybrand Botes (RSA) | 16
Gurcharn Singh (IND) | 7
Enrique Flores (PUR) | 15
Troy Amos-Ross (CAN) | KO-3
Roland Raforme (SEY) | 2:16
Peter Odhiambo (KEN) | 6
Paul Mbongo (CMR) | 15
Vassili Jirov (KAZ) | RSC-2
Julio González (MEX) | 2:10
Pietro Aurino (ITA) | 15
Yusuf Öztürk (TUR) | 7
Adnan Khaddour (SYR) | 4
Daniel Bispo Jr. (BRA) | 9
Ayoub Pourtaghi (IRI) | 9
Jean-Louis Mandengue (FRA) | 21
Ismael Koné (SWE) | 22
İlham Kərimov (AZE) | 3
Rick Timperi (AUS) | 7
Thomas Ulrich (GER) | 21
John Douglas (GUY) | 2:52
Stipe Drviš (CRO) | RSC-2
Rostislav Zaoulitchni (UKR) | 3
Timur Ibragimov (UZB) | 7
Samuela Leuii (SAM) | 0
Lee Seung-Bae (KOR) | 14
Mohamed Mahmoud (EGY) | 9
Freddy Rojas (CUB) | 20

Round of 16
David Kowah (SLE) | 2:43
Antonio Tarver (USA) | RSC-1
Sybrand Boted (RSA) | 7
Enrique Flores (PUR) | 16
Troy Amos-Ross (CAN) | 7
Paul Mbongo (CMR) | 3
Vassili Jirov (KAZ) | 18
Pietro Aurino (ITA) | 13
Daniel Bispo Jr. (BRA) | RSCH-1
Jean-Louis Mandengue (FRA) | 1:50
Ismael Koné (SWE) | 9
Thomas Ulrich (GER) | 24
Stipe Drviš (CRO) | 10
Timur Ibragimov (UZB) | 9
Lee Seung-Bae (KOR) | 13
Freddy Rojas (CUB) | 9

Quarterfinals
Antonio Tarver (USA) | RSCH-1
Enrique Flores (PUR) | 1:54
Troy Amos-Ross (CAN) | 8
Vassili Jirov (KAZ) | 14
Daniel Bispo Jr. (BRA) | 7
Thomas Ulrich (GER) | 14
Stipe Drviš (CRO) | 11
Lee Seung-Bae (KOR) | 14

Semifinals
Antonio Tarver (USA) | 9
Vassili Jirov (KAZ) | 15
Thomas Ulrich (GER) | 8
Lee Seung-Bae (KOR) | 12

Final
Vassili Jirov (KAZ) | 17
Lee Seung-Bae (KOR) | 4
