= Egypt at the Olympics =

- IOC code: EGY
- NOC: Egyptian Olympic Committee
- Website: www.egyptianolympic.org (in Arabic and English)
- Medals Ranked 62nd: Gold 9 Silver 12 Bronze 20 Total 41

Summer appearances
- 1912; 1920; 1924; 1928; 1932; 1936; 1948; 1952; 1956; 1960–1964; 1968; 1972; 1976; 1980; 1984; 1988; 1992; 1996; 2000; 2004; 2008; 2012; 2016; 2020; 2024

Winter appearances
- 1984; 1988–2026

Other related appearances
- 1906 Intercalated Games –––– United Arab Republic (1960, 1964)

Egypt first participated at the Olympic Games in 1912, and has sent athletes to compete in most of the Summer Olympic Games since then. Along with Cambodia, Iraq and Lebanon, Egypt boycotted the 1956 Summer Olympics in protest of the tripartite Israeli, British, and French invasion of Egypt in the Suez War. However, three Egyptian riders competed at the equestrian events for the 1956 Games held in Stockholm, Sweden five months earlier (because of Australian quarantine regulations). Egypt withdrew from the 1976 Summer Olympics after three days of competition to join the broad African boycott in response to the participation of New Zealand, which still had sporting links with apartheid South Africa. Egypt also participated in the American-led boycott of the 1980 Summer Olympics in protest of the Soviet Union's invasion of Afghanistan. Egypt's participation at the Winter Olympic Games was a single alpine skier in 1984.

Egyptian athletes have won a total of 41 medals, with weightlifting as its top sport.

The National Olympic Committee for Egypt is the Egyptian Olympic Committee, and was created in 1910.

From 1960 to 1964, Egypt and Syria participated together as the United Arab Republic with a majority of Egyptian athletes, although it is unknown if Syria actually sent athletes.

== Medal tables ==
=== Medals by Summer Games ===
| Games | Athletes | Gold | Silver | Bronze | Total | Rank |
| 1912 Stockholm | 1 | 0 | 0 | 0 | 0 | – |
| 1920 Antwerp | 22 | 0 | 0 | 0 | 0 | – |
| 1924 Paris | 24 | 0 | 0 | 0 | 0 | – |
| 1928 Amsterdam | 32 | 2 | 1 | 1 | 4 | 17 |
| 1932 Los Angeles | did not participate | | | | | |
| 1936 Berlin | 54 | 2 | 1 | 2 | 5 | 15 |
| 1948 London | 85 | 2 | 2 | 1 | 5 | 16 |
| 1952 Helsinki | 106 | 0 | 0 | 1 | 1 | 40 |
| 1956 Melbourne | 3 | 0 | 0 | 0 | 0 | – |
| 1960 Rome | 74 | 0 | 1 | 1 | 2 | 30 |
| 1964 Tokyo | 73 | 0 | 0 | 0 | 0 | – |
| 1968 Mexico City | 30 | 0 | 0 | 0 | 0 | – |
| 1972 Munich | 23 | 0 | 0 | 0 | 0 | – |
| 1976 Montreal | 29 | 0 | 0 | 0 | 0 | – |
| 1980 Moscow | boycotted | | | | | |
| 1984 Los Angeles | 114 | 0 | 1 | 0 | 1 | 33 |
| 1988 Seoul | 49 | 0 | 0 | 0 | 0 | – |
| 1992 Barcelona | 75 | 0 | 0 | 0 | 0 | – |
| 1996 Atlanta | 29 | 0 | 0 | 0 | 0 | – |
| 2000 Sydney | 89 | 0 | 0 | 0 | 0 | – |
| 2004 Athens | 97 | 1 | 1 | 3 | 5 | 46 |
| 2008 Beijing | 103 | 0 | 0 | 2 | 2 | 80 |
| 2012 London | 113 | 0 | 3 | 1 | 4 | 56 |
| 2016 Rio de Janeiro | 119 | 0 | 0 | 3 | 3 | 66 |
| 2020 Tokyo | 132 | 1 | 1 | 4 | 6 | 54 |
| 2024 Paris | 164 | 1 | 1 | 1 | 3 | 52 |
| 2028 Los Angeles | future event | | | | | |
| 2032 Brisbane | future event | | | | | |
| Total | | 9 | 12 | 20 | 41 | 62 |

=== Medals by Winter Games ===
| Games | Athletes | Gold | Silver | Bronze | Total | Rank |
| 1984 Sarajevo | 1 | 0 | 0 | 0 | 0 | – |
| 1988–2026 | did not participate | | | | | |
| 2030 French Alps | future event | | | | | |
| 2034 Utah | future event | | | | | |
| Total | | 0 | 0 | 0 | 0 | – |

=== Medals by sport ===
| Sport | Gold | Silver | Bronze | Total |
|---|---|---|---|---|
| Weightlifting | 5 | 4 | 6 | 15 |
| Wrestling | 2 | 3 | 3 | 8 |
| Modern pentathlon | 1 | 1 | 0 | 2 |
| Karate | 1 | 0 | 1 | 2 |
| Boxing | 0 | 1 | 3 | 4 |
| Diving | 0 | 1 | 1 | 2 |
| Fencing | 0 | 1 | 1 | 2 |
| Judo | 0 | 1 | 1 | 2 |
| Taekwondo | 0 | 0 | 4 | 4 |
| Totals (9 entries) | 9 | 12 | 20 | 41 |

== List of medalists ==
| Medal | Name | Games | Sport | Event |
|---|---|---|---|---|
| Gold | El-Sayed Nosseir | 1928 Amsterdam | Weightlifting | Men's light heavyweight |
| Gold | Ibrahim Moustafa | 1928 Amsterdam | Wrestling | Men's Greco-Roman light heavyweight |
| Silver | Farid Simaika | 1928 Amsterdam | Diving | Men's 10 m platform |
| Bronze | Farid Simaika | 1928 Amsterdam | Diving | Men's 3 m springboard |
| Gold | Anwar Mesbah | 1936 Berlin | Weightlifting | Men's lightweight |
| Gold | Khadr El-Touni | 1936 Berlin | Weightlifting | Men's middleweight |
| Silver | Saleh Soliman | 1936 Berlin | Weightlifting | Men's featherweight |
| Bronze | Ibrahim Shams | 1936 Berlin | Weightlifting | Men's featherweight |
| Bronze | Ibrahim Wasif | 1936 Berlin | Weightlifting | Men's light heavyweight |
| Gold | Mahmoud Fayad | 1948 London | Weightlifting | Men's featherweight |
| Gold | Ibrahim Shams | 1948 London | Weightlifting | Men's lightweight |
| Silver | Attia Hamouda | 1948 London | Weightlifting | Men's lightweight |
| Silver | Mahmoud Hassan | 1948 London | Wrestling | Men's Greco-Roman bantamweight |
| Bronze | Ibrahim Orabi | 1948 London | Wrestling | Men's Greco-Roman light heavyweight |
| Bronze | Abdel Aal Rashed | 1952 Helsinki | Wrestling | Men's Greco-Roman featherweight |
| Silver | Osman El-Sayed | 1960 Rome | Wrestling | Men's Greco-Roman flyweight |
| Bronze | Abdel Moneim El-Guindi | 1960 Rome | Boxing | Men's flyweight |
| Silver | Mohamed Ali Rashwan | 1984 Los Angeles | Judo | Men's open |
| Gold | Karam Gaber | 2004 Athens | Wrestling | Men's Greco-Roman 96 kg |
| Silver | Mohamed Aly | 2004 Athens | Boxing | Men's super heavyweight |
| Bronze | Ahmed Ismail | 2004 Athens | Boxing | Men's light heavyweight |
| Bronze | Mohamed Elsayed | 2004 Athens | Boxing | Men's heavyweight |
| Bronze | Tamer Bayoumi | 2004 Athens | Taekwondo | Men's 58 kg |
| Bronze | Hesham Mesbah | 2008 Beijing | Judo | Men's −90 kg |
| Bronze | Abeer Abdelrahman | 2008 Beijing | Weightlifting | Women's 69 kg |
| Silver | Alaaeldin Abouelkassem | 2012 London | Fencing | Men's foil |
| Silver | Abeer Abdelrahman | 2012 London | Weightlifting | Women's 75 kg |
| Silver | Karam Gaber | 2012 London | Wrestling | Men's Greco-Roman 84 kg |
| Bronze | Tarek Yehia | 2012 London | Weightlifting | Men's 85 kg |
| Bronze | Mohamed Ehab | 2016 Rio de Janeiro | Weightlifting | Men's 77 kg |
| Bronze | Sara Ahmed | 2016 Rio de Janeiro | Weightlifting | Women's 69 kg |
| Bronze | Hedaya Malak | 2016 Rio de Janeiro | Taekwondo | Women's 57 kg |
| Gold | Feryal Abdelaziz | 2020 Tokyo | Karate | Women's +61 kg |
| Silver | Ahmed El-Gendy | 2020 Tokyo | Modern pentathlon | Men's |
| Bronze | Hedaya Malak | 2020 Tokyo | Taekwondo | Women's 67 kg |
| Bronze | Seif Eissa | 2020 Tokyo | Taekwondo | Men's 80 kg |
| Bronze | Mohamed Ibrahim El-Sayed | 2020 Tokyo | Wrestling | Men's Greco-Roman 67 kg |
| Bronze | Giana Farouk | 2020 Tokyo | Karate | Women's −61 kg |
| Gold | Ahmed El-Gendy | 2024 Paris | Modern pentathlon | Men's |
| Silver | Sara Ahmed | 2024 Paris | Weightlifting | Women's 81 kg |
| Bronze | Mohamed El-Sayed | 2024 Paris | Fencing | Men's épée |

== Flagbearers ==
Summer Olympics
| Games | Athlete | Sport |
|---|---|---|
| 1912 Stockholm | Ahmed Hassanein | Fencing |
| 1920 Antwerp | | |
| 1924 Paris | | |
| 1928 Amsterdam | | |
| 1932 Los Angeles | did not participate | |
| 1936 Berlin | Fathallah Abdel Rahman | Fencing |
| 1948 London | | |
| 1952 Helsinki | | |
| 1956 Melbourne | | |
| 1960 Rome | | |
| 1964 Tokyo | | |
| 1968 Mexico City | | |
| 1972 Munich | Kamal Kamel Muhammed | Basketball |
| 1976 Montreal | | |
| 1980 Moscow | did not participate | |
| 1984 Los Angeles | Mohamed Sayed Soliman | Basketball |
| 1988 Seoul | Mohamed Khorshed | Shooting |
| 1992 Barcelona | Mohamed Khorshed | Shooting |
| 1996 Atlanta | Hosam Abdallah | Handball |
| 2000 Sydney | Yahia Rashwan | Taekwondo |
| 2004 Athens | Ali Ibrahim | Rowing |
| 2008 Beijing | Karam Gaber | Wrestling |
| 2012 London | Hesham Mesbah | Judo |
| 2016 Rio de Janeiro | Ahmed El-Ahmar | Handball |
| 2020 Tokyo | Hedaya Malak; Alaaeldin Abouelkassem | Taekwondo; Fencing |
| 2024 Paris | Sara Ahmed; Ahmed El-Gendy | Weightlifting; Modern pentathlon |

Winter Olympics
| Games | Athlete | Sport |
|---|---|---|
| 1984 Sarajevo | Jamil El Reedy | Alpine skiing |

== See also ==
- List of flag bearers for Egypt at the Olympics
- List of Olympic women for Egypt
- Category:Olympic competitors for Egypt
- Egypt at the Paralympics
- Egypt at the Mediterranean Games
- Egypt at the African Games
- Sports in Egypt
