= Judo at the 1992 Summer Olympics – Women's +72 kg =

Judo at the Olympics

Women's +72 kg at the Games of the XXV Olympiad
- Venue: Palau Blaugrana
- Date: 27 July 1992
- Competitors: 21 from 21 nations

Medalists
| 1st place, gold medalist(s) | | Zhuang Xiaoyan | China |
| 2nd place, silver medalist(s) | | Estela Rodríguez | Cuba |
| 3rd place, bronze medalist(s) | | Natalia Lupino | France |
| 3rd place, bronze medalist(s) | | Yoko Sakaue | Japan |

The women's +72 kg competition in judo at the 1992 Summer Olympics in Barcelona was held on 27 July at the Palau Blaugrana. The gold medal was won by Zhuang Xiaoyan of China.

== Results ==
=== Main brackets ===
==== Pool A ====
Round of 32
Heba Hefny (EGY) | E
Svetlana Gundarenko (EUN) | IPO
Nilmari Santini (PUR) | RA
Natalia Lupino (FRA) | IPO
Beata Maksymow (POL) | YUK
Anne Åkerblom (FIN) | E

Round of 16
Svetlana Gundarenko (EUN) | WAZ
Monique van der Lee (NED) | E
Natalia Lupino (FRA) | IPO
Jane Patterson (CAN) | RA
Beata Maksymow (POL) | RA
Estela Rodríguez (CUB) | YUS
Sangita Mehta (IND) | E
Supatra Yompakdee (THA) | IPO

Quarterfinal
Svetlana Gundarenko (EUN) | RA
Natalia Lupino (FRA) | IPO
Estela Rodríguez (CUB) | YUS
Supatra Yompakdee (THA) | RA

Semifinal
Natalia Lupino (FRA) | RB
Estela Rodríguez (CUB) | YUK

==== Pool B ====
Round of 32
Zhuang Xiaoyan (CHN) | KOK
Sharon Lee (GBR) | RB
Yoko Sakaue (JPN) | YUS
Edilene Andrade (BRA) | RB

Round of 16
Zhuang Xiaoyan (CHN) | WIP
Inmaculada Vicent (ESP) | RB
Éva Gránitz (HUN) | YUS
Maria Teresa Motta (ITA) | E
Yoko Sakaue (JPN) | IPO
Colleen Rosensteel (USA) | RB
Claudia Weber (GER) | CHU
Mun Ji-yun (KOR) | E

Quarterfinal
Zhuang Xiaoyan (CHN) | WIP
Éva Gránitz (HUN) | RB
Yoko Sakaue (JPN) | IPO
Claudia Weber (GER) | RB

Semifinal
Zhuang Xiaoyan (CHN) | IPO
Yoko Sakaue (JPN) | RA

=== Repechages ===
==== Repechage A ====
Repechage round 1
Nilmari Santini (PUR) | YUS
Jane Patterson (CAN) | E

Repechage quarterfinal
Nilmari Santini (PUR) | E
Svetlana Gundarenko (EUN) | WIP
Beata Maksymow (POL) | IPO
Supatra Yompakdee (THA) | E

Repechage semifinal
Svetlana Gundarenko (EUN) | E
Beata Maksymow (POL) | KOK

Repechage final
Beata Maksymow (POL) | E
Yoko Sakaue (JPN) | IPO (bronze)

==== Repechage B ====
Repechage round 1
Sharon Lee (GBR) | WAZ
Inmaculada Vicent (ESP) | E
Edilene Andrade (BRA) | IPO
Colleen Rosensteel (USA) | E

Repechage quarterfinal
Sharon Lee (GBR) | E
Éva Gránitz (HUN) | IPO
Edilene Andrade (BRA) | E
Claudia Weber (GER) | KIK

Repechage semifinal
Éva Gránitz (HUN) | E
Claudia Weber (GER) | IPO

Repechage final
Claudia Weber (GER) | E
Natalia Lupino (FRA) | IPO (bronze)

=== Final ===
| Final |
| Estela Rodríguez (CUB) | 2nd place, silver medalist(s) |
| Zhuang Xiaoyan (CHN) | WIP (gold) |

== Final classification ==
| Rank | Judoka | Nation |
|---|---|---|
| 1st place, gold medalist(s) | Zhuang Xiaoyan | China |
| 2nd place, silver medalist(s) | Estela Rodríguez | Cuba |
| 3rd place, bronze medalist(s) | Natalia Lupino | France |
| 3rd place, bronze medalist(s) | Yoko Sakaue | Japan |
| 5T | Beata Maksymow | Poland |
| 5T | Claudia Weber | Germany |
| 7T | Éva Gránitz | Hungary |
| 7T | Svetlana Gundarenko | Unified Team |
| 9T | Nilmari Santini | Puerto Rico |
| 9T | Supatra Yompakdee | Thailand |
| 9T | Sharon Lee | Great Britain |
| 9T | Edilene Andrade | Brazil |
| 13T | Jane Patterson | Canada |
| 13T | Inmaculada Vicent | Spain |
| 13T | Colleen Rosensteel | United States |
| 16T | Monique van der Lee | Netherlands |
| 16T | Sangita Mehta | India |
| 16T | Maria Teresa Motta | Italy |
| 16T | Mun Ji-yun | South Korea |
| 20T | Anne Åkerblom | Finland |
| 20T | Heba Hefny | Egypt |
