= Zhuang Xiaoyan =

Chinese judoka

Personal information
- Nickname: Tiger
- Born: 4 May 1969 (age 57) Shenyang, Liaoning, People's Republic of China
- Home town: Shenyang, Liaoning, People's Republic of China
- Occupation: Judo coach

Sport
- Country: China
- Sport: Judo
- Weight class: +72 kg, Open
- Coached by: Liu Yongfu

Achievements and titles
- Olympic Games: (gold) (1992)
- World Champ.: (gold) (1991)
- Asian Champ.: (gold) (1990)
Medal record
Women's judo
Representing China
Olympic Games
Gold medal – first place	1992 Barcelona	+72 kg
World Championships
Gold medal – first place	1991 Barcelona	Open
Asian Games
Gold medal – first place	1990 Beijing	Open

Profile at external databases
- IJF: 53902
- JudoInside.com: 4766
- Updated on 6 June 2023

Zhuang Xiaoyan (庄晓岩; born 4 May 1969) is a Chinese judo coach, former international judo champion, and winner of the gold medal for judo in the women's +72 kg (heavyweight) division at the 1992 Summer Olympics. Her medal was China's first Olympic gold medal in judo.

== Early life ==
Zhuang was born on 4 May 1969 in Shenyang, Liaoning, China. Her parents worked in a fertiliser plant. She initially trained in shot put, discus, and javelin, but changed to judo at the age of 14 years. A year later, she was selected for the Liaoning provincial judo team. Her nickname amongst her fellow athletes was 'Tiger.'

== Competitive judo career ==
In 1986, Zhuang joined the Chinese national judo team. That same year, she came second in the National Judo Championship. In 1987, she was champion in the women's open class at the National Games, and in 1988, she took victory in the same class at the International Judo Championships. Through the late 1980s, she also competed in tournaments at Fukuoka. Her coach for international competition was Liu Yongfu. She was listed at 173 cm (5 ft 8 in) in height and 98 kg (216 lb) in weight.

More international victories followed for Zhuang at the 1990 Asian Games in Beijing and the 1991 World Judo Championships in Barcelona. At the 1992 Summer Olympics, Zhuang defeated Estela Rodríguez Villanueva from Cuba to win the gold medal in the women's +72 kg division for judo. This was China's first Olympic gold medal in judo, and was the first of three consecutive victories for China in this competition—Sun Fuming (1996) and Yuan Hua (2000) also won Olympic gold medals in the heaviest women's division in judo.

Following her Olympic victory, Zhuang married and had twin daughters, but separated from her husband a few years later. She retired from judo competition in 1995.

== Post-competition career ==
Zhuang was one of the torchbearers in the Olympic torch relay for the 2008 Summer Olympics in Beijing. Her fingerprints and footprints are preserved in the flagstones of Beidaihe Olympic Avenue Park, Beidaihe District, along with those of 44 other Chinese Olympic champions. She now trains judo competitors at the Liaoning provincial institute of sports technology.

== See also ==
- Chen Zhong
- China at the 1992 Summer Olympics
- Judo at the Summer Olympics
