= Vassiliy Jirov =

Kazakhstani boxer (born 1974)

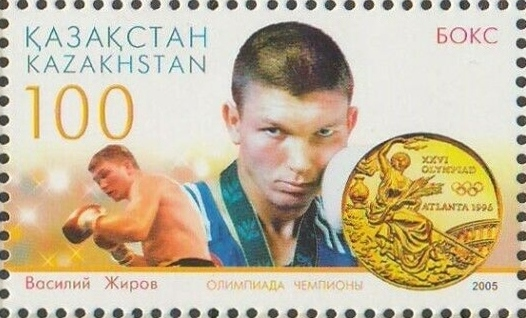
- Jirov on a Kazakhstani postage stamp

Personal information
- Nickname: The Tiger
- Nationality: Kazakhstani
- Born: Vassiliy Valeryevich Jirov; 4 April 1974 (age 52) Balkhash, Kazakh SSR, Soviet Union (now Kazakhstan)
- Height: 6 ft 2 in (188 cm)
- Weight: Cruiserweight; Heavyweight

Boxing career
- Reach: 74 in (188 cm)
- Stance: Southpaw

Boxing record
- Total fights: 42
- Wins: 38
- Win by KO: 32
- Losses: 3
- Draws: 1
Medal record
Representing Kazakhstan
Olympic Games
Gold medal – first place	1996 Atlanta	Light heavyweight
World Championships
Bronze medal – third place	1993 Tampere	Middleweight
Bronze medal – third place	1995 Berlin	Light heavyweight
Asian Games
Bronze medal – third place	1994 Hiroshima	Light heavyweight

Vassiliy Valeryevich Jirov (Russian: Васи́лий Вале́рьевич Жи́ров; born 4 April 1974), sometimes known as Vasily Zhirov, is a Kazakhstani former professional boxer who competed from 1997 to 2009, and held the IBF cruiserweight world title from 1999 to 2003. As an amateur he won a gold medal at the 1996 Olympics, as well as consecutive bronzes at the 1993 and 1995 World Championships, all in the light heavyweight division.

== Amateur career ==
Jirov took up boxing in 1986 when he was 12, studying at the Balkhash Technical School. His first coach was Alexander Apachinsky (Merited Trainer of the Republic of Kazakhstan, Master of Sports of the USSR). Jirov later recalled that:

I came to boxing after seeing the movie "Rocky", I was eager to be like Rocky. The first time in the ring was painful, I welcomed punches, there were bruises. I said that I will go through it, after all it's not so painful, not so sad, it could make life better. My first coach Alexander Ivanovich Apachinsky wanted me to grow up not just a boxer, but to grow up a man. He helped me doing that. He was a tough man, but if you look at life, at that energy of life, its pressure would simply eat you up. He taught me to go all the way, no matter what.

From 1989 to 1991, he became the champion of the Kazakh SSR three times in a row. In 1990 he became the champion of the All-Union Spartakiad of Young Students (4 fights, 4 victories, Moscow,) and also won the USSR Youth Championship (4 fights, 4 victories, Donetsk,) received a degree of Master of Sports of the USSR in boxing.

In 1991, Jirov, who was yet at the junior age class, didn't win the USSR Championship in Saratov (4 fights, 3 wins, 2nd place,) however he received an invitation to the USSR youth team.

In 1994, Vassiliy moved to the light heavyweight division (up to 81 kg.)

In December 1996, Jirov travelled to the United States, where he signed a contract with boxing promoter Bob Arum and began his career as a professional boxer.

=== Highlights ===
(gold) International Junior Tournament (Middleweight), Tashkent, Uzbek SSR, December 1991:

- (no data available)

(gold) European Junior Championships (Middleweight), Edinburgh, Scotland, April 1992:

- 1/4: Defeated Thomas Hansvold (Norway) RSC 2
- 1/2: Defeated Rickard Eckvall (Sweden) 12–6
- Finals: Defeated Sinan Şamil Sam (Turkey) 11–7

(bronze) World Championships (Middleweight), Tampere, Finland, May 1993:

- 1/8: Defeated Francesco Passanante (Switzerland) RSC 3
- 1/4: Defeated Andrey Khamula (Ukraine) 15–9
- 1/2: Lost to Akin Kuloglu (Turkey) 2–9

World Cup (Light heavyweight), Bangkok, Thailand, June 1994:

- 1/8: Defeated Haik Postolokyan (Armenia) 11–3
- 1/4: Lost to Islam Arsangaliev (Russia) 4–12

(bronze) Asian Games (Light heavyweight), Hiroshima, Japan, October 1994:

- 1/4: Defeated Asghar Ali (Pakistan) RSC
- 1/2: Lost to Young-Sam Ko (South Korea) 10–17

(gold) Chemistry Cup (Light heavyweight), Halle, Germany, March 1995:

- 1/4: Defeated Sven Ottke (Germany) PTS
- 1/2: Defeated Thomas Ulrich (Germany) by walkover
- Finals: Defeated Ulf Brezina (Germany) RET 1

(gold) Sweden Open (Light heavyweight), Stockholm, Sweden, 1996:

- Finals: Defeated Stephen Kirk (Ireland) RSC 2

(gold) Korean Open (Light heavyweight), Seoul, South Korea, 1995:

- (no data available)

(bronze) World Championships (Light heavyweight), Berlin, Germany, May 1995:

- 1/8: Defeated Ervins Helmanis (Latvia) KO 2
- 1/4: Defeated Ismael Kone (Sweden) RSC 1
- 1/2: Lost to Antonio Tarver (United States) 6–9

(gold) Asian Championships (Light heavyweight), Tashkent, Uzbekistan, October 1995:

- 1/4: Defeated Vitaliy Ilyushin (Turkmenistan) RET 2
- 1/2: Defeated Ayoub Pourtaghi Ghoushchi (Iran) 10–1
- Finals: Defeated Lee Seung-bae (South Korea) 15–2

(gold) Moscow Open (Light heavyweight), Moscow, Russia, October 1995:

- Finals: Defeated Timur Ibragimov (Uzbekistan) by unanimous decision, 5–0

(gold) Chemistry Cup (Light heavyweight), Halle, Germany, February–March 1996:

- 1/4: Defeated Rostyslav Zaulychnyi (Ukraine) 12–1
- 1/2: Defeated Ramón Garbey (Cuba) 18–10
- Finals: Defeated Thomas Ulrich (Germany) by walkover

(gold) Summer Olympics (Light heavyweight), Atlanta, Georgia, July–August 1996:

- 1/16: Defeated Julio César González (Mexico) RSC 2
- 1/8: Defeated Pietro Aurino (Italy) 18–3
- 1/4: Defeated Troy Amos-Ross (Canada) 14–8
- 1/2: Defeated Antonio Tarver (United States) 15–9
- Finals: Defeated Lee Seung-Bae (South Korea) 17–4

Jirov was awarded the Val Barker Trophy for outstanding performance at the 1996 Summer Olympics.

He finished his amateur career having 217 fights under his belt, with a record of 207 wins, 10 losses (no stoppages.)

== Professional career ==
Jirov made his debut as a professional on 18 January 1997, with a two-round knockout of Vince Brown in Las Vegas. He won eleven fights that first year, all by knockout, including wins over Exum Speight and Art Jimmerson. In 1998, he won eight fights, six before the final bell. On 5 May he won the WBC's regional cruiserweight title with a 12-round decision over Rich La Montaigne, who became the first boxer to last the full distance against Jirov. On 5 December he once again fought in Ukrainian territory. In his first fight as a professional in Ukraine, he beat Alexander Vasiliev in Kyiv by decision in eight rounds.

=== IBF cruiserweight champion ===
In 1999, Jirov was given his first world title try: In front of an HBO Boxing audience, he beat IBF cruiserweight world champion Arthur Williams by a knockout in seven rounds at Biloxi, Mississippi.

For his first defense, he fought at the main supportive event at the Felix Trinidad-Oscar De La Hoya undercard on 18 September, retaining the crown with a ten-round knockout of Canadian Dale Brown.

In 2000, he beat Saul Montana by knockout in round nine to retain the world title on an Univision televised fight, and won two non-title bouts, including one over Esteban Pizarro at the Playboy mansion.

On 6 February 2001, Jirov went to Kazakhstan to defend his crown in his home-country for the first time. There, he retained the title with a first-round knockout of Álex González. He won three more fights that year, one a world title affair against Julian Letterlough (knockout win in 8).

There were reports that Jirov's team and HBO were trying to negotiate a matchup against Roy Jones Jr., but those talks fell through.

In 2002 Jirov, then managed by the Sugar Ray Leonard promotion company, defended his crown once that year, beating former world Middleweight champion Jorge Castro of Argentina by a 12-round decision on 1 February at the Celebrity Theater in Phoenix. Talks had begun about a fight of his against former multiple division world champion James Toney. However, negotiations took long and Jirov spent more than one year outside the ring, time in which the IBF threatened to take away recognition of Jirov as world champion if he did not defend his crown soon. As a result of these managerial problems, Jirov also moved from the SAR club gym, favored by his management, to Joe Diaz's Gym, near Downtown Phoenix.

=== Losing the title to Toney ===
Jirov and Toney finally met on 26 April 2003, and Jirov suffered his first career defeat, when he lost the IBF cruiserweight world title to Toney by a 12-round unanimous decision. On 9 August Jirov came back, beating fringe contender Ernest Mateen by knockout in seven rounds.

On 6 November 2003 he won the NABO regional cruiserweight title with a six-round knockout of Joseph Kiwanuka in Phoenix. Jirov's next fight was against ex-heavyweight champion, Michael Moorer. Jirov was beaten by Moorer via TKO in the ninth round. Over the next six months, Jirov defeated Forrest Neal by knockout in round 3 and defeated Troy Beats by unanimous decision. His next fight was against former heavyweight and cruiserweight contender Orlin Norris. Jirov and Norris fought to a draw.

In his first return bout to the cruiserweight division (April 20, 2006) he defeated Luke Munsen in a unanimous decision.

On 14 July 2007 Jirov defeated Kenny 'The Raven' Craven by TKO in second round of 10 round scheduled bout.

As a heavyweight, Jirov also lost to Joe Mesi by unanimous decision, after throwing a blow to Mesi that resulted in subdural bleeding near the fight's end. Jirov knocked down Mesi four times in the last two rounds. It also marked the downturn in Jirov's fighting career, and after a few more fights, he retired in 2009.

=== Post-fight career in boxing ===
Jirov lives in Dubai and is a coach at Boxing Golden Ring. Reflecting on his time as a fighter, Jirov said: “I travelled the world, got paid and kicked some ass.”

== Professional boxing record ==
42 fights	38 wins	3 losses
By knockout	32	1
By decision	6	2
Draws	1	

No.	Result	Record	Opponent	Type	Round, time	Date	Location	Notes
42	Win	38–3–1	(United States) Jonathan Williams	TKO	2 (10), 2:52	17 Oct 2009	(United States) Celebrity Theatre, Phoenix, Arizona, US	
41	Win	37–3–1	(United States) Kenny Craven	TKO	2 (10), 2:18	14 Jul 2007	(United States) 4 Bears Casino & Lodge, New Town, North Dakota, US	
40	Win	36–3–1	(United States) Luke Munsen	UD	10	20 Apr 2006	(United States) Coeur d'Alene Casino Resort Hotel, Worley, Idaho, US	
39	Draw	35–3–1	(United States) Orlin Norris	MD	8	21 Jul 2005	(United States) Palace Indian Gaming Center, Lemoore, California, US	
38	Win	35–3	(United States) Troy Beets	UD	10	14 May 2005	(United States) Coushatta Casino Resort, Kinder, Louisiana, US	
37	Win	34–3	(United States) Forrest Neal	TKO	3 (10), 1:10	7 Apr 2005	(United States) Pechanga Resort & Casino, Temecula, California, US	
36	Loss	33–3	(United States) Michael Moorer	TKO	9 (12), 2:08	9 Dec 2004	(United States) Pechanga Resort & Casino, Temecula, California, US	For vacant WBA North American, WBA–NABA, and WBC Continental Americas heavyweight titles
35	Loss	33–2	(United States) Joe Mesi	UD	10	13 Mar 2004	(United States) Mandalay Bay Events Center, Paradise, Nevada, US	
34	Win	33–1	(Uganda) Joseph Kiwanuka	RTD	6 (12), 3:00	6 Nov 2003	(United States) Celebrity Theatre, Phoenix, Arizona, US	Won vacant WBO–NABO cruiserweight title
33	Win	32–1	(United States) Ernest Mateen	TKO	7 (10), 1:09	7 Aug 2003	(United States) Pechanga Resort & Casino, Temecula, California, US	
32	Loss	31–1	(United States) James Toney	UD	12	26 Apr 2003	(United States) Foxwoods Resort Casino, Ledyard, Connecticut, US	Lost IBF cruiserweight title
31	Win	31–0	(Argentina) Jorge Castro	UD	12	1 Feb 2002	(United States) Celebrity Theatre, Phoenix, Arizona, US	Retained IBF cruiserweight title
30	Win	30–0	(United States) Julian Letterlough	TKO	8 (12), 1:24	8 Sep 2001	(United States) Lawlor Events Center, Reno, Nevada, US	Retained IBF cruiserweight title
29	Win	29–0	(United States) Adolpho Washington	UD	10	20 Jul 2001	(United States) Memorial Civic Center, Canton, Ohio, US	
28	Win	28–0	(United States) Terry McGroom	KO	1 (12), 1:22	24 Mar 2001	(United States) MGM Grand Garden Arena, Paradise, Nevada, US	Retained IBF cruiserweight title
27	Win	27–0	(Puerto Rico) Alex Gonzales	KO	1 (12), 1:35	6 Feb 2001	Baluan Sholak Sports Palace, Almaty, Kazakhstan	Retained IBF cruiserweight title
26	Win	26–0	(United States) Earl Butler	TKO	2 (10), 2:35	29 Jul 2000	(United States) Veterans Memorial Coliseum, Phoenix, Arizona, US	
25	Win	25–0	(Puerto Rico) Esteban Pizzarro	KO	2 (10), 2:59	19 May 2000	(United States) Playboy Mansion, Los Angeles, California, US	
24	Win	24–0	(United States) Don Normand	TKO	1	25 Mar 2000	(United States) Seven Feathers Casino Resort, Canyonville, Oregon, US	
23	Win	23–0	(Mexico) Saúl Montana	TKO	9 (12), 2:55	12 Feb 2000	(United States) Bank of America Centre, Boise, Idaho, US	Retained IBF cruiserweight title
22	Win	22–0	(Canada) Dale Brown	KO	10 (12), 2:52	18 Sep 1999	(United States) Mandalay Bay Events Center, Paradise, Nevada, US	
21	Win	21–0	(United States) Arthur Williams	TKO	7 (12), 1:59	5 Jun 1999	(United States) Grand Casino, Biloxi, Mississippi, US	Won IBF cruiserweight title
20	Win	20–0	(Ivory Coast) Onebo Maxime	KO	5 (12), 2:48	22 Apr 1999	(United States) Hilton Anatole, Dallas, Texas, US	Won vacant WBC Continental Americas cruiserweight title
19	Win	19–0	(Mexico) Cesar Rendon	KO	1 (8), 0:25	6 Mar 1999	(United States) Fantasy Springs Resort Casino, Indio, California, US	
18	Win	18–0	(Russia) Alexander Vasiliev	UD	8	5 Dec 1998	Palace of Sports, Kyiv, Ukraine	
17	Win	17–0	(United States) John Kiser	TKO	8 (10), 0:43	3 Oct 1998	(United States) Las Vegas Hilton, Winchester, Nevada, US	
16	Win	16–0	(United States) Cliff Nellon	TKO	3 (8), 2:22	6 Aug 1998	(United States) Grand Casino Avoyelles, Marksville, Louisiana, US	
15	Win	15–0	(United States) Rich LaMontagne	UD	12	5 May 1998	(United States) Grand Casino, Biloxi, Mississippi, US	Won vacant WBC International cruiserweight title
14	Win	14–0	(United States) Jason Waller	TKO	1, 2:00	14 Mar 1998	(United States) Etess Arena, Atlantic City, New Jersey, US	
13	Win	13–0	(United States) Trent Surratt	TKO	2 (8), 2:58	10 Feb 1998	(United States) Midnight Rodeo, Phoenix, Arizona, US	
12	Win	12–0	(United States) Jason Nicholson	TKO	2 (10), 2:37	23 Jan 1998	(United States) Grand Casino, Tunica, Mississippi, US	
11	Win	11–0	(United States) Art Jimmerson	TKO	2 (10), 2:55	6 Dec 1997	(United States) Circus Maximus Showroom, Atlantic City, New Jersey, US	
10	Win	10–0	(United States) Quinton Osgood	TKO	1 (8), 2:15	18 Oct 1997	(United States) Star of the Desert Arena, Primm, Nevada, US	
9	Win	9–0	(United States) Calvin Combs	TKO	2 (8), 1:17	12 Sep 1997	(United States) Caesars Palace, Paradise, Nevada, US	
8	Win	8–0	(United States) Dennis Matthews	TKO	4 (6), 1:47	5 Jul 1997	(United States) Isle of Capri Casino, Lake Charles, Louisiana, US	
7	Win	7–0	(Ethiopia) Gesses Mesgana	TKO	2 (8), 2:23	31 May 1997	(United States) Etess Arena, Atlantic City, New Jersey, US	
6	Win	6–0	(United States) Tyrone Armstead	RTD	4 (6), 3:00	12 Apr 1997	(United States) Tropicana Las Vegas, Paradise, Nevada, US	
5	Win	5–0	(United States) Calvin Smith	TKO	1 (4)	30 Mar 1997	(United States) Mohegan Sun Arena, Montville, Connecticut, US	
4	Win	4–0	(United States) Aljenon DeBose	TKO	3 (6), 2:54	8 Mar 1997	(United States) Convention Center, Albuquerque, New Mexico, US	
3	Win	3–0	(United States) Chuck Miller	TKO	4, 2:38	12 Feb 1997	(United States) The Theater at Madison Square Garden, New York City, New York, US	
2	Win	2–0	(United States) Exum Speight	TKO	3 (6), 2:00	28 Jan 1997	(United States) Club Rio, Tempe, Arizona, US	
1	Win	1–0	(United States) Vincent Brown	TKO	2 (6), 1:29	18 Jan 1997	(United States) Thomas & Mack Center, Paradise, Nevada, US	

Sporting positions
Regional boxing titles
Vacant Title last held by Juan Carlos Gómez	WBC International cruiserweight champion 5 May 1998 – 22 April 1999; Won Continental Americas title	Vacant Title next held by Wayne Braithwaite
Vacant Title last held by Elieser Castillo	WBC Continental Americas cruiserweight champion 22 April 1999 – June 1999; Vacated	Vacant Title next held by Jason Robinson
Vacant Title last held by Ravea Springs	WBO–NABO cruiserweight champion 6 November 2003 – December 2003; Vacated	Vacant Title next held by Jermell Barnes
World boxing titles
Preceded by Arthur Williams	IBF cruiserweight champion 5 June 1999 – 26 April 2003	Succeeded by James Toney
