= Judo at the 1996 Summer Olympics – Women's +72 kg =

Women's +72 kg at the Games of the XXVI Olympiad
- Venue: Georgia World Congress Center
- Date: 20 July 1996
- Competitors: 20 from 20 nations

Medalists
1st place, gold medalist(s)		Sun Fuming	China
2nd place, silver medalist(s)		Estela Rodríguez	Cuba
3rd place, bronze medalist(s)		Johanna Hagn	Germany
3rd place, bronze medalist(s)		Christine Cicot	France

These are the results of the women's +72 kg (also known as heavyweight) competition in judo at the 1996 Summer Olympics in Atlanta, Georgia. A total of 20 women competed in this event, limited to jūdōka whose body weight was more than 72 kilograms. Competition took place on July 20 of 1996 in the Georgia World Congress Center.

Two single-elimination pools, with winner of each pool advanced to the final. All judoka losing to the finalists in each pool advanced to repêchage pools, with the winners of the repêchage pools earning bronze medals.

== Results ==
The gold and silver medalists were determined by the final match of the main single-elimination bracket.

Round of 32
Angelique Seriese (NED)	L
Johanna Hagn (GER)	W
Noriko Anno (JPN)	L
Edinanci da Silva (BRA)	W
Arti Kohli (IND)	L
Estela Rodríguez (CUB)	W
Heidi Burnett (AUS)	W
Colleen Rosensteel (USA)	L

Round of 16
Sun Fuming (CHN)	W
Michelle Rogers (GBR)	L
Johanna Hagn (GER)	W
Donata Burgatta (ITA)	L
Marguerita Goua Lou (CIV)	L
Éva Granicz (HUN)	W
Edinanci da Silva (BRA)	L
Svetlana Gundarenko (RUS)	W
Nancy Filteau (CAN)	W
Yeh Wen-hua (TPE)	L
Estela Rodríguez (CUB)	W
Son Hyeon-mi (KOR)	L
Heidi Burnett (AUS)	L
Heba Hefny (EGY)	W
Beata Maksymow (POL)	W
Christine Cicot (FRA)	L

Quarterfinals
Sun Fuming (CHN)	W
Johanna Hagn (GER)	L
Éva Granicz (HUN)	L
Svetlana Gundarenko (RUS)	W
Nancy Filteau (CAN)	L
Estela Rodríguez (CUB)	W
Heba Hefny (EGY)	L
Beata Maksymow (POL)	W

Semifinals
Sun Fuming (CHN)	W
Svetlana Gundarenko (RUS)	L
Estela Rodríguez (CUB)	W
Beata Maksymow (POL)	L

Gold medal final
Sun Fuming (CHN)	W
Estela Rodríguez (CUB)	L

=== Repechage ===
The losing semifinalists as well as those judoka eliminated in earlier rounds by the four semifinalists of the main bracket advanced to the repechage. These matches determined the two bronze medalists for the event.

First round

Second round
Michelle Rogers (GBR)	L
Johanna Hagn (GER)	W
Éva Granicz (HUN)	L
Edinanci da Silva (BRA)	W
Nancy Filteau (CAN)	L
Son Hyeon-Mi (KOR)	W
Heba Hefny (EGY)	L
Christine Cicot (FRA)	W

Third round
Johanna Hagn (GER)	W
Edinanci da Silva (BRA)	L
Son Hyeon-Mi (KOR)	L
Christine Cicot (FRA)	W

Bronze medal finals
Beata Maksymow (POL)	L
Johanna Hagn (GER)	W
Svetlana Gundarenko (RUS)	L
Christine Cicot (FRA)	W
