= Thomas Ulrich =

German boxer (born 1975)

Personal information
- Nationality: German
- Born: 11 July 1975 (age 51) Berlin, Germany
- Height: 1.85 m (6 ft 1 in)
- Weight: Light-heavyweight

Boxing career
- Reach: 187 cm (74 in)
- Stance: Orthodox

Boxing record
- Total fights: 39
- Wins: 32
- Win by KO: 22
- Losses: 7
Medal record
Men's amateur boxing
Representing Germany
Olympic Games
Bronze medal – third place	1996 Atlanta	Light heavyweight
World Championships
Bronze medal – third place	1995 Berlin	Light heavyweight

Thomas Ulrich (born 11 July 1975, in Berlin) is a German former professional boxer who competed from 1997 to 2012. He challenged twice for a light-heavyweight world title: the WBC title in 2005, and the WBO title in 2006. He also held the European light-heavyweight title three times from 2002 to 2008. As an amateur, he won a bronze medal at the 1996 Olympics in the light-heavyweight division.

== Amateur career ==
Ulrich was the German Light Heavyweight Champion 1994. Ulrich won the light heavyweight bronze medal at the 1996 Summer Olympics, just like he did a year before at the 1995 World Amateur Boxing Championships in Berlin.

=== Amateur Highlights ===
- 1992 2nd place as a Middleweight at the Junior World Championships in Montreal, Canada. Results were:
  - Defeated Jae-Yeul Uk (South Korea) RSC-3
  - Defeated Willard Lewis (Canada) RSCI-2
  - Lost to Islam Arsangaliev (Russia) RSC-1
- 1995 3rd place as a Light Heavyweight at the World Championships in Berlin, Germany. Results were:
  - Defeated Yevgeny Makarenko (Russia) PTS
  - Defeated Mohammed Benguesmia (Algeria) PTS
  - Defeated Timur Ibragimov (Uzbekistan) WO
  - Lost to Diosvani Vega (Cuba) PTS
- 1995 2nd place at the Military World Championships in Rome, Italy. Results were:
  - Defeated Um (South Korea) RSC-1
  - Defeated Sergey Krupenich (Belarus) PTS (10-6)
  - Lost to Pietro Aurino (Italy) PTS (6-10)
- 1996 competed at the European Championships in Vejle, Denmark. Results were:
  - Defeated Zoltán Béres (Hungary) RSC-1
  - Lost to Yusuf Öztürk (Turkey) PTS (10-15)
- 1996 Representing Germany, Ulrich won the Bronze Medal as a Light Heavyweight at the Atlanta Olympics. Results were:
  - Defeated Rick Timperi (Australia) PTS (21-7)
  - Defeated Ismael Kone (Sweden) PTS (24-9)
  - Defeated Daniel Bispo (Brazil) PTS (14-7)
  - Lost to Lee Seung-Bae (South Korea) PTS (8-12)

== Pro career ==
Ulrich turned pro 1997 and began his career 20-0 before getting stopped in the 6th round by future titlist Glen Johnson. He then won his next eight bouts, setting up a shot at WBC Light Heavyweight Title holder Tomasz Adamek in 2005. Adamek won via 6th-round KO. In 2006, Ulrich got a shot at WBO Light Heavyweight Title holder Zsolt Erdei and lost a decision.

== Professional boxing record ==
39 fights	32 wins	7 losses
By knockout	22	6
By decision	10	1

No.	Result	Record	Opponent	Type	Round, time	Date	Location	Notes
39	Loss	32–7	Dustin Dirks	KO	4 (8), 2:00	5 May 2012	Messe, Erfurt, Germany	
38	Loss	32–6	Sergej Rozvadovskij	TKO	7 (8), 1:49	4 Apr 2011	Gerry Weber Stadion, Halle, Germany	
37	Win	32–5	Gyula Gaspar	KO	3 (8)	9 Oct 2010	Sporthalle, Hamburg, Germany	
36	Loss	31–5	Mariano Nicolas Plotinsky	KO	11 (12), 1:35	7 Mar 2009	Freiberger Arena, Dresden, Germany	For vacant WBO Inter-Continental light-heavyweight title
35	Loss	31–4	Yuri Barashian	KO	8 (12), 0:56	23 Feb 2008	Brandberge Arena, Halle, Germany	Lost European light-heavyweight title
34	Win	31–3	Leonardo Turchi	KO	1 (12), 2:01	19 May 2007	Color Line Arena, Hamburg, Germany	Retained European light-heavyweight title
33	Win	30–3	Rachid Kanfouah	TKO	10 (12), 2:36	13 Jan 2007	Brandberge Arena, Halle, Germany	Won WBO Inter-Continental and vacant European light-heavyweight titles
32	Loss	29–3	Zsolt Erdei	UD	12	29 Jul 2006	König Pilsener Arena, Oberhausen, Germany	For WBO light-heavyweight title
31	Win	29–2	Henry Saenz	UD	10	8 Apr 2006	Ostseehalle, Kiel, Germany	
30	Loss	28–2	Tomasz Adamek	KO	6 (12), 1:57	15 Oct 2005	Mehrzweckhalle Süd, Düsseldorf, Germany	For WBC light-heavyweight title
29	Win	28–1	Matthew Barney	UD	12	26 Mar 2005	Erdgas Arena, Riesa, Germany	Retained European light-heavyweight title
28	Win	27–1	Silvio Branco	KO	11 (12), 0:51	17 Jul 2004	Stadthalle, Zwickau, Germany	Won vacant European light-heavyweight title
27	Win	26–1	Michael Rush	UD	12	14 Feb 2004	Hanns-Martin-Schleyer-Halle, Stuttgart, Germany	Retained WBC International light-heavyweight title
26	Win	25–1	Carl Handy	UD	8	15 Nov 2003	Hanns-Martin-Schleyer-Halle, Stuttgart, Germany	
25	Win	24–1	Graciano Rocchigiani	UD	12	10 May 2003	Hanns-Martin-Schleyer-Halle, Stuttgart, Germany	Won vacant WBC International light-heavyweight title
24	Win	23–1	Yawe Davis	KO	2 (12)	12 Oct 2002	Sport- und Kongresshalle, Schwerin, Germany	Won European light-heavyweight title
23	Win	22–1	Marco Antonio Duarte	KO	3 (8)	16 Mar 2002	Hanns-Martin-Schleyer-Halle, Stuttgart, Germany	
22	Win	21–1	Mohamed Siluvangi	UD	8	15 Dec 2001	Estrel Convention Center, Berlin, Germany	
21	Loss	20–1	Glen Johnson	KO	6 (12)	28 Jul 2001	Estrel Convention Center, Berlin, Germany	Lost WBO Inter-Continental light-heavyweight title
20	Win	20–0	Gabriel Hernández	TKO	8 (12)	10 Feb 2001	Estrel Convention Center, Berlin, Germany	Retained WBO Inter-Continental light-heavyweight title
19	Win	19–0	Ali Forbes	UD	8	14 Oct 2000	Kolnarena, Cologne, Germany	
18	Win	18–0	Maurizio Colombo	TKO	2 (6)	23 Jun 2000	FTC Stadium, Budapest, Hungary	
17	Win	17–0	Cleveland Nelson	KO	8 (12)	1 Apr 2000	Estrel Convention Center, Berlin, Germany	Won vacant WBO Inter-Continental light-heavyweight title
16	Win	16–0	Warren Moore	KO	2	4 Dec 1999	Stadionsporthalle, Hanover, Germany	
15	Win	15–0	Ali Saidi	TKO	8 (12)	20 Feb 1999	Alsterdorfer Sporthalle, Hamburg, Germany	Retained German International light-heavyweight title; Won vacant Germany BDB light-heavyweight title
14	Win	14–0	Vinson Durham	KO	3	12 Dec 1998	Balsporthalle, Frankfurt, Germany	
13	Win	13–0	Jerry Williams	KO	8	3 Oct 1998	Prinz-Garden Halle, Bayern, Germany	
12	Win	12–0	Milan Konecny	KO	9 (10)	22 Aug 1998	Sport und Erholungszentrum, Berlin, Germany	Won German International light-heavyweight title
11	Win	11–0	Juan Nelongo	TKO	7 (8)	5 Jun 1998	Alsterdorfer Sporthalle, Hamburg, Germany	
10	Win	10–0	LaVerne Clark	KO	2	2 May 1998	Hansehalle, Lübeck, Germany	
9	Win	9–0	Shane Davis	KO	1	20 Mar 1998	Ballsporthalle, Frankfurt, Germany	
8	Win	8–0	Cliff Nellon	PTS	6	17 Jan 1998	Sport und Erholungszentrum, Berlin, Germany	
7	Win	7–0	Gabor Ott	KO	5	11 Oct 1997	Stadthalle, Cottbus, Germany	
6	Win	6–0	Hamilton Diaz	KO	1 (6)	23 Aug 1997	Maritim Hotel, Stuttgart, Germany	
5	Win	5–0	Eric Davis	PTS	6	13 Jun 1997	Arena Oberhausen, Oberhausen, Germany	
4	Win	4–0	Mirsad Brkic	KO	1	26 Apr 1997	Leipzig, Germany	
3	Win	3–0	Dennis Lawlor	KO	2 (4)	8 Mar 1997	Sartory-Saal, Cologne, Germany	
2	Win	2–0	Donnie Penelton	PTS	4	15 Feb 1997	Stadthalle, Cottbus, Germany	
1	Win	1–0	Guy Stanford	KO	4	11 Jan 1997	Sport und Erholungszentrum, Berlin, Germany	

Sporting positions
Regional boxing titles
Vacant Title last held by Silvio Meinel	German International light-heavyweight champion August 22, 1998 – November 1999; Vacated	Vacant Title next held by Ahmet Oener
Vacant Title last held by Sven Ottke	Germany BDB light-heavyweight champion February 20, 1999 – November 1999; Vacated	Vacant Title next held by Norbert Nieroba
Vacant Title last held by Muslim Biarslanov	WBO Inter-Continental light-heavyweight champion April 1, 2000 – July 28, 2001	Succeeded by Glen Johnson
Preceded by Yawe Davis	European light-heavyweight champion October 12, 2002 – January 2003; Vacated	Vacant Title next held by Stipe Drews
Vacant Title last held by Sasha Mitreski	WBC International light-heavyweight champion May 10, 2003 – June 2004; Vacated	Vacant Title next held by Pietro Aurino
Vacant Title last held by Stipe Drews	European light-heavyweight champion July 17, 2004 – October 15, 2005; Lost bid for WBC title	Vacant Title next held by Stipe Drews
Preceded by Rachid Kanfouah	WBO Inter-Continental light-heavyweight champion January 13, 2007 – June 2007; Vacated	Vacant Title next held by Aleksy Kuziemski
Vacant Title last held by Stipe Drews	European light-heavyweight champion January 13, 2007 – February 23, 2008	Succeeded by Yuri Barashian
