= Timur Ibragimov =

Uzbekistani boxer (born 1975)

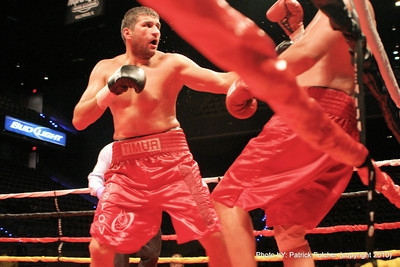
- Ibragimov dispatches of Gurcharan Singh

Personal information
- Nationality: Uzbekistani
- Born: January 15, 1975 (age 51) Urgench, Khorezm, Uzbek SSR, Soviet Union
- Weight: Heavyweight

Boxing career
- Stance: Orthodox

Boxing record
- Total fights: 36
- Wins: 31
- Win by KO: 16
- Losses: 4
- Draws: 1
- No contests: 0
Medal record
Men's amateur boxing
Representing Uzbekistan
World Cup
| Bronze medal – third place | 1994 Bangkok | Light heavyweight |
World Military Championships
| Silver medal – second place | 1997 San Antonio | Light heavyweight |
| Silver medal – second place | 1998 Warendorf | Light heavyweight |
Central Asian Games
| Gold medal – first place | 1997 Almaty | Light heavyweight |

Timur Ibragimov (Тимур Ибрагимов; born January 15, 1975) is an Uzbekistani former professional boxer who competed from 2000 to 2012. As an amateur, he competed at the 1996 Summer Olympics.

== Early life ==
Ibragimov is from Uzbekistan. He has frequently been presented by various media as the brother or cousin of former WBO Heavyweight Champion Sultan Ibragimov, although Sultan is a native of Dagestan and they are not relatives, but close friends, and they are also friends with Uzbek boxer Ruslan Chagaev.

== Amateur career ==
Ibragimov (center) with Mukhtarkhan Dildabekov (left) at the King's Cup awards ceremony, Bangkok, 1998

Ibragimov had over 200 amateur fights, and during the 1990s, he was one of the world's leading amateur boxers in the light heavyweight division. In 1991, Ibragimov won the Soviet Union Junior National Championships for his age category (16 to 18 years old). After the break-up of the USSR, Ibragimov won the Uzbekistani National Championships five times. Ibragimov participated several times in the Asian Amateur Boxing Championships and the Asian Games, and in 1995 he was a quarter finalist at the World Amateur Boxing Championships in Berlin. Ibragimov won the Gold Medal at the Central Asian Games in 1997.

Ibragimov participated in the 1996 Summer Olympics in Atlanta as a member of the 1996 Uzbek Olympic team. In this tournament, Ibragimov lost a highly controversial decision to Croatia's Stipe Drews.

=== Highlights ===
(bronze) World Cup (81 kg), Bangkok, Thailand, June 1994:

- 1/8: Defeated Ricky Ortega (United States) 19–6 (5 rds)
- 1/4: Defeated Zoltán Béres (Hungary) 25–9 (5 rds)
- 1/2: Lost to Sven Ottke (Germany) 3–20 (5 rds)

Asian Games (81 kg), Hiroshima, Japan, October 1994:

- 1/4: Lost to Lakha Singh (India) 4–8

World Championships (81 kg), Berlin, Germany, May 1995:

- 1/16: Defeated Mehmed Skomorac (Yugoslavia) 8–3
- 1/8: Defeated In Soo Lee (South Korea) 7–3
- 1/4: Lost to Thomas Ulrich (Germany) by walkover

Asian Championships (81 kg), Tashkent, Uzbekistan, October 1995:

- 1/8: Lost to Lee Seung Bae (South Korea) 1–4

(silver) Moscow Open (81 kg), Moscow, Russia, October 1995:

- Finals: Lost to Vasiliy Jirov (Kazakhstan) by unanimous decision, 0–5

(gold) Golden Belt Tournament (81 kg), Bucharest, Romania, March 1996:

- (no data available)

Summer Olympics (81 kg), Atlanta, Georgia, July 1996:

- 1/16: Defeated Rostyslav Zaulychnyi (Ukraine) 7–3
- 1/8: Lost to Stipe Drews (Croatia) 9–10

President's Cup (81 kg), Bogor, Indonesia, July 1997:

- 1/4: Defeated Gurcharan Singh (India) 12–4 (5 rds)
- 1/2: Defeated Syarif Hidayat (Indonesia) 19–2 (5 rds)
- Finals: Defeated Regan Foley (New Zealand) 7–5 (5 rds)

(gold) Central Asian Games (81 kg), Almaty, Kazakhstan, 1997:

- (no data available)

(silver) World Military Championships (81 kg), San Antonio, Texas, December 1997:

- 1/4: Defeated J. Bahadur (India) 32–0 (5 rds)
- 1/2: Defeated Mohamed Bahari (Algeria) 7–5 (5 rds)
- Finals: Lost to Konstantin Gorbunov (Russia) 4–+4 (5 rds)

(gold) King's Cup (91 kg), Bangkok, Thailand, April 1998:

- Finals: Defeated Mukhtarkhan Dildabekov (Kazakhstan) 11–3 (5 rds)

(silver) World Military Championships (81 kg), Warendorf, Germany, September 1998:

- Finals: Lost to Magomed Aripgadzhiev (Russia) 8–9 (5 rds)

(silver) Four Nations International Tournament (91 kg), Moscow, Russia, July 2000:

- 1/2: Defeated Talgat Dossanov (Kazakhstan)
- Finals: Lost to Sultan Ibragimov (Russia) 5–12

== Professional career ==
Ibragimov turned professional in 2000, fighting alongside his cousin Sultan in a stable managed by Boris Grinsberg. Now based in the United States, Ibragimov ran up a record of 21–0–1 by 2006. His lone draw was against Kevin Johnson.

Ibragimov (right) hitting Willie Palms. Photo courtesy of Ray Bailey.

In 2006 Ibragimov faced then-undefeated heavyweight contender Calvin Brock. The fight took place in Caesars Palace in Las Vegas, Nevada, and was aired on HBO as part of Boxing After Dark series. Although he rocked Brock early with a solid right cross, Ibragimov fought defensively for most of the bout. During the fight, the temperature exceeded 100 °F (38 °C), which resulted in each fighter unwilling to press the action. The fight went full twelve rounds, with Ibragimov suffering his first career loss, with the judges scoring the bout 119–109, 115–113 and 117–111, all in favor of Brock.

On February 16, 2007 Ibragimov lost a unanimous decision to Tony Thompson. Ibragimov rallied in the last two rounds, but was not able to overcome the points advantage accumulated by Thompson earlier in the bout. The scores were 99–91, 97–93, and 97–93.

Later in 2007, Ibragimov won a unanimous decision over former European champion Timo Hoffmann in Germany. Ibragimov dominated the bout with shifty boxing tactics and hurtful counter rights to the head. The scores were 99–94, 98–92, and 97–93. The victory was regarded as an upset, and it positioned Ibragimov on the edge of the world ratings.

Due to promotional and managerial problems, Ibragimov was inactive after beating Hoffman. In 2008, Ibragimov fought only twice, winning decisions each time. He won two fights in 2009 as well.

Ibragimov had an important year in 2010, winning four fights and obtaining high worldwide rating by the World Boxing Association. In February, he took the International Boxing Association Intercontinental heavyweight title by knocking out Awadh Tamim in three rounds. In June, Ibragimov scored his most important career victory by outpointing former world heavyweight champion Oliver McCall over twelve rounds. The scores were 119–109, 117–111, and 117–111. The McCall victory earned Ibragimov the North American Boxing Association heavyweight title. Ibragimov next defeated Gurcharan Singh and Luis Pineda.

In December 2010, Ibragimov lost a 12-round split decision to former cruiserweight champion Jean-Marc Mormeck. The bout, held in Paris for the vacant WBA International heavyweight title, was closely contested. Many reporters actually scored the fight in favor of Ibragimov. One judge favored Ibragimov 115–113, but was overruled by two judges who chose Mormeck by margins of 116–111 and 116–112. At the time of this match, Ibragimov was ranked seventh worldwide by the World Boxing Association.

After the Mormeck fight, Ibragimov remained inactive for an entire year. When he finally fought again, in December 2011, he was surprisingly stopped in two rounds by the undefeated, power-punching contender Seth Mitchell. The defeat, which took place in Washington, D.C., marked the first time that Ibragimov had lost by knockout or technical knockout as an amateur or professional.

Ibragimov won a fight in June 2012, by outpointing South Africa's Wiseman Dlomo in a bout held in Uzbekistan.

== Professional boxing record ==
| 36 fights | 31 wins | 4 losses |
|---|---|---|
| By knockout | 16 | 1 |
| By decision | 15 | 3 |
| Draws | 1 | |

| No. | Result | Record | Opponent | Type | Round, time | Date | Location | Notes |
|---|---|---|---|---|---|---|---|---|
| 36 | Win | 31–4–1 | Wiseman Dlomo | UD | 12 | 25 Jun 2012 | Kichkintoy Park, Namangan, Uzbekistan | |
| 35 | Loss | 30–4–1 | Seth Mitchell | TKO | 2 (10), 2:48 | 10 Dec 2011 | Convention Center, Washington, D.C., U.S. | |
| 34 | Loss | 30–3–1 | Jean Marc Mormeck | SD | 12 | 2 Dec 2010 | Halle Georges Carpentier, Paris, France | For vacant WBA International heavyweight title |
| 33 | Win | 30–2–1 | Luis Andres Pineda | UD | 10 | 2 Oct 2010 | Roberto Durán Arena, Panama City, Panama | Retained WBA–NABA heavyweight title |
| 32 | Win | 29–2–1 | Gurcharan Singh | TKO | 10 (10), 1:45 | 24 Aug 2010 | Seminole Hard Rock Hotel And Casino, Hollywood, Florida, England | |
| 31 | Win | 28–2–1 | Oliver McCall | UD | 12 | 15 Jun 2010 | Seminole Hard Rock Hotel And Casino, Hollywood, Florida, England | Won vacant WBA–NABA heavyweight title |
| 30 | Win | 27–2–1 | Awadh Tamim | TKO | 3 (12), 2:15 | 6 Feb 2010 | Aquarium Hotel, Krasnogorsk, Russia | Won vacant IBA Inter-Continental heavyweight title |
| 29 | Win | 26–2–1 | Al Cole | UD | 6 | 4 Sep 2009 | Löfbergs Arena, Karlstad, Sweden | |
| 28 | Win | 25–2–1 | Willie Palms | TKO | 5 (6), 2:00 | 31 Jul 2009 | Resorts Hotel & Casino, Atlantic City, New Jersey, US | |
| 27 | Win | 24–2–1 | Kevin Montiy | UD | 8 | 6 Sep 2008 | Red Square, Moscow, Russia | |
| 26 | Win | 23–2–1 | Andrew Greeley | UD | 6 | 26 Jul 2008 | Southwest Arena, Charlotte, North Carolina, US | |
| 25 | Win | 22–2–1 | Timo Hoffmann | UD | 10 | 23 Jun 2007 | Stadthalle, Zwickau, Germany | |
| 24 | Loss | 21–2–1 | Tony Thompson | UD | 10 | 16 Feb 2007 | Playboy Mansion, Beverly Hills, California, US | For WBC Continental Americas heavyweight title |
| 23 | Loss | 21–1–1 | Calvin Brock | UD | 12 | 24 Jun 2006 | Caesars Palace, Paradise, Nevada, US | Lost WBC FECARBOX heavyweight title |
| 22 | Win | 21–0–1 | Kenny Craven | RTD | 2 (8), 3:00 | 24 Mar 2006 | Seminole Hard Rock Hotel And Casino, Hollywood, Florida, England | |
| 21 | Win | 20–0–1 | Paul Marinaccio | TKO | 7 (12), 3:00 | 11 Nov 2005 | Civic Center, Kissimmee, Florida, US | Retained WBC FECARBOX heavyweight title |
| 20 | Win | 19–0–1 | Rogerio Lobo | KO | 4 (12), 0:51 | 24 Jun 2005 | Orleans Hotel & Casino, Paradise, Nevada, US | Retained WBC FECARBOX heavyweight title |
| 19 | Win | 18–0–1 | David Polk | UD | 10 | 22 Apr 2005 | Tropicana Hotel & Casino, Atlantic City, New Jersey, US | |
| 18 | Win | 17–0–1 | Ronald Bellamy | KO | 3 (12), 2:56 | 3 Mar 2005 | The Theater at Madison Square Garden, New York City, New York, US | Retained WBC FECARBOX heavyweight title |
| 17 | Win | 16–0–1 | Billy Douglas | UD | 12 | 11 Dec 2004 | Atlantic Oceana, Brighton Beach, New York, US | Retained WBC FECARBOX heavyweight title |
| 16 | Win | 15–0–1 | Shawn Robinson | TKO | 1 (12), 2:58 | 16 Oct 2004 | Club Ovation, Boynton Beach, Florida, US | Won vacant WBC FECARBOX heavyweight title |
| 15 | Win | 14–0–1 | Earl Ladson | KO | 2 (6), 0:45 | 30 Jul 2004 | Freedom Hall State Fairground, Louisville, Kentucky, US | |
| 14 | Draw | 13–0–1 | Kevin Johnson | UD | 4 | 17 Jun 2004 | Harrah's Laughlin, Laughlin, Nevada, US | |
| 13 | Win | 13–0 | Terry McGroom | UD | 8 | 22 Apr 2004 | USC Soviet Wings, Moscow, Russia | |
| 12 | Win | 12–0 | Dmitry Gerasimov | KO | 1 (6) | 6 Apr 2004 | Casino Crystall, Moscow, Russia | |
| 11 | Win | 11–0 | Joseph Kenneth Reyes | TKO | 4 (4) | 6 Feb 2004 | Miccosukee Indian Gaming Resort, Miami, Florida, US | |
| 10 | Win | 10–0 | Juan Carlos Viloria | TKO | 2 (6), 2:00 | 10 Jan 2004 | Club Ovation, Boynton Beach, Florida, US | |
| 9 | Win | 9–0 | Vitaliy Grigoriev | RTD | 3 (8), 3:00 | 12 Sep 2003 | Yunost Sport Palace, Donetsk, Ukraine | |
| 8 | Win | 8–0 | Jerry Cruz | TKO | 1 (6), 1:18 | 1 Aug 2003 | A La Carte Event Pavilion, Tampa, Florida, US | |
| 7 | Win | 7–0 | Gilberto Melo | TKO | 3 (6) | 6 Jun 2003 | Express, Rostov-na-Donu, Russia | |
| 6 | Win | 6–0 | Kostyantyn Pryziuk | UD | 6 | 22 Apr 2003 | Casino Camilla, Moscow, Russia | |
| 5 | Win | 5–0 | Sam Tillman | UD | 6 | 26 Mar 2003 | Convention Center, Miami, Florida, US | |
| 4 | Win | 4–0 | Onebo Maxime | UD | 4 | 20 Dec 2002 | American Airlines Arena, Miami, Florida, US | |
| 3 | Win | 3–0 | John James | TKO | 1 (4), 2:50 | 6 Dec 2002 | Paladium, Davie, Florida, US | |
| 2 | Win | 2–0 | Lee Howard | UD | 4 | 27 Sep 2002 | Harriet Himmel Theatre, West Palm Beach, Florida, US | |
| 1 | Win | 1–0 | Dmitry Naumov | UD | 6 | 29 Mar 2000 | Vodoley, Ekaterinburg, Russia | |
