= Stipe Drews =

Croatian boxer (born 1973)

Stipe Drviš
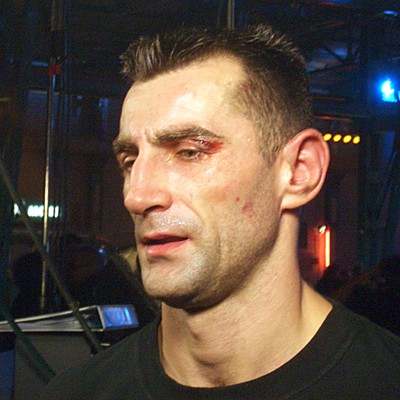

Personal information
- Nickname: Spiderman
- Nationality: Croatian
- Born: Stipe Drviš; 8 June 1973 (age 53) Makarska, SR Croatia, SFR Yugoslavia
- Height: 6 ft 5 in (196 cm)
- Weight: Light heavyweight

Boxing career
- Stance: Southpaw

Boxing record
- Total fights: 34
- Wins: 32
- Win by KO: 13
- Losses: 2
Medal record
Men's Boxing
Representing Croatia
Mediterranean Games
Silver medal – second place	Bari 1997	Light Heavyweight

Stipe Drews (born Stipe Drviš, 8 June 1973) is a Croatian former professional boxer who competed from 1999 to 2007. He has held the World Boxing Association (WBA) light heavyweight title in 2007.

== Amateur career ==
As an amateur he took part at the European championships in 1996, but lost his third fight to the eventual champion Pietro Aurino. In the same year he was nominated for the 1996 Summer Olympics, but lost in the quarter-finals to Seung-Bae Lee. He was second at the Mediterranean games in 1997. During his amateur career he was six times Croatian champion. He won 90 fights out of 100.

=== Amateur highlights ===
- Amateur Record: 90–10
- 6 time Croatian Champion
- Member of the 1996 Croatian Olympic Team as a Light Heavyweight. His results were:
  - Defeated John Douglas (Guyana) TKO 2
  - Defeated Timur Ibragimov (Uzbekistan) 10–9
  - Lost to Lee Seung-Bae (South Korea) 11–14

== Professional career ==
Drews began his professional career in 1999. On 8 February 2003 he became European champion with a victory over Silvio Branco. After three title defenses he relinquished the title and instead fought against Paul Briggs for the WBC World Championship title. He lost this fight. Drews fought again several times for the European title and won all matches. Two world champion matches were called off. On 28 April 2007, Drews won in Oberhausen, Germany against Silvio Branco, and became the WBA World light heavyweight champion. He lost his title against Australian Danny Green in Perth on 16 December 2007. Drews lost the match on points.

== Personal ==
Stipe Drews bears the nickname Spiderman which is due to his long arms and his speed. He currently lives in Pula, Croatia with his wife and one child, where he manages his beach bar Pomidor.

In March 2008 Stipe Drews participated in reality show called "Farma" on Croatian Nova TV. After enduring three weeks in the show, he started up a fist fight with 57-year-old photographer Stephen Lupino during live TV broadcast and thus was disqualified from the show.

== Professional boxing record ==
34 fights	32 wins	2 losses
By knockout	13	0
By decision	19	2

No.	Result	Record	Opponent	Type	Round, time	Date	Location	Notes
34	Loss	32–2	(Australia) Danny Green	UD	12	2007-12-16	Challenge Stadium, Perth, Australia	Lost WBA light heavyweight title
33	Win	32–1	(Italy) Silvio Branco	UD	12	2007-04-28	König Pilsener Arena, Oberhausen, Germany	Won WBA light heavyweight title
32	Win	31–1	(Germany) Kai Kurzawa	UD	12	2006-05-27	Zenith, Munich, Bavaria, Germany	Retained EBU light heavyweight title
31	Win	30–1	(Italy) Antonio Brancalion	UD	12	2006-01-07	Zenith, Munich, Bavaria, Germany	Won vacant EBU light heavyweight title
30	Win	29–1	(Argentina) Omar Gonzalez	UD	12	2005-06-18	Pula Arena, Pula, Istria, Croatia	Won vacant WBO Inter-Continental light heavyweight title
29	Win	28–1	(United States) Yameen Muhammad	TKO	1	2005-03-05	Wilhelm Dopatka Halle, Leverkusen, Germany	
28	Win	27–1	(United Kingdom) Ovill McKenzie	UD	8	2004-12-04	Estrel Convention Center, Berlin, Germany	
27	Loss	26–1	(Australia) Paul Briggs	UD	12	2004-08-15	State Sports Centre, Sydney, New South Wales, Australia	WBC light heavyweight title eliminator
26	Win	26–0	(Ukraine) Kostyantyn Shvets	UD	12	2004-05-08	Westfalenhallen, Dortmund, North Rhine-Westphalia, Germany	Retained EBU light heavyweight title
25	Win	25–0	(France) Olivier Beard	TKO	6	2003-11-18	Universum Gym, Hamburg, Germany	Retained EBU light heavyweight title
24	Win	24–0	(France) Kamel Amrane	UD	12	2003-07-12	Wilhelm Dopatka Halle, Leverkusen, Germany	Retained EBU and IBF Inter-Continental light heavyweight titles
23	Win	23–0	(Italy) Silvio Branco	UD	12	2003-02-08	Estrel Convention Center, Berlin, Germany	Won vacant EBU light heavyweight title
22	Win	22–0	(Liberia) Lee Manuel Ossie	UD	12	2002-11-23	Westfalenhallen, Dortmund, North Rhine-Westphalia, Germany	Won vacant IBF Inter-Continental light heavyweight title
21	Win	21–0	(Colombia) Faustino Gonzalez	UD	8	2002-09-14	Volkswagen Halle, Braunschweig, Lower Saxony, Germany	
20	Win	20–0	(Democratic Republic of the Congo) Mohamed Siluvangi	PTS	8	2002-07-20	Westfalenhallen, Dortmund, North Rhine-Westphalia, Germany	
19	Win	19–0	(France) Yohan Gimenez	PTS	6	2002-04-06	Universum Gym, Hamburg, Germany	
18	Win	18–0	(Italy) Massimiliano Saiani	TKO	3	2002-02-08	Volkswagen Halle, Braunschweig, Lower Saxony, Germany	
17	Win	17–0	(Turkey) Bruce Özbek	KO	2	2001-11-24	Universum Gym, Hamburg, Germany	
16	Win	16–0	(Hungary) Zoltán Béres	PTS	6	2001-09-23	Festzelt, Eddersheim, Hesse, Germany	
15	Win	15–0	(Netherlands) Talal Santiago	TKO	6	2001-07-21	Tivoli Eissporthalle, Aachen, North Rhine-Westphalia, Germany	
14	Win	14–0	(Slovakia) Julius Gal	PTS	6	2001-05-05	Volkswagen Halle, Braunschweig, Lower Saxony, Germany	
13	Win	13–0	(Hungary) Tamás Elekes	TKO	5	2001-01-27	Rudi-Sedlmayer-Halle, Munich, Bavaria, Germany	
12	Win	12–0	(Tunisia) Ridha Soussi	PTS	8	2000-11-25	Preussag Arena, Hanover, Lower Saxony, Germany	
11	Win	11–0	(Germany) Andre Mewis	KO	5	2000-10-01	Universum Gym, Hamburg, Germany	Won vacant German International light heavyweight title
10	Win	10–0	(Romania) Mihai Iftode	PTS	4	2000-06-23	FTC Stadium, Budapest, Hungary	
9	Win	9–0	(Croatia) Ivica Cukusic	PTS	6	2000-05-28	Universum Gym, Hamburg, Germany	
8	Win	8–0	(Slovakia) Stefan Stanko	TKO	2	2000-03-31	St. Gallen, St. Gallen, Switzerland	
7	Win	7–0	(United States) Ruben Ruiz	KO	1	2000-02-05	Rhein-Ruhr Halle, Duisburg, North Rhine-Westphalia, Germany	
6	Win	6–0	(Slovakia) Jaroslav Cepicky	TKO	4	1999-12-11	Alsterdorfer Sporthalle, Hamburg, Germany	
5	Win	5–0	(Slovakia) Julius Gal	PTS	6	1999-10-23	Ballsporthalle, Frankfurt, Hesse, Germany	
4	Win	4–0	(Hungary) Csaba Olah	TKO	5	1999-10-09	König Pilsener Arena, Oberhausen, North Rhine-Westphalia, Germany	
3	Win	3–0	(Hungary) László Mikes	KO	4	1999-09-18	Maritim Hotel, Stuttgart, Baden-Württemberg, Germany	
2	Win	2–0	(Belgium) Philip Houthoofdt	TKO	1	1999-07-10	Sporthalle Augsburg, Augsburg, Bavaria, Germany	
1	Win	1–0	(Slovakia) Julius Gal	PTS	4	1999-05-22	Sportpalace, Budapest, Hungary	

== See also ==
- List of world light-heavyweight boxing champions

Sporting positions
Regional boxing titles
Vacant Title last held by Thomas Ulrich	EBU light-heavyweight champion 8 February 2003 – 2004; Vacated	Vacant Title next held by Thomas Ulrich
Vacant Title last held by Thomas Ulrich	EBU light-heavyweight champion 7 January 2006 – 2006; Vacated	Vacant Title next held by Thomas Ulrich
World boxing titles
Preceded by Silvio Branco	WBA light heavyweight champion 28 April 2007 – 16 December 2007	Succeeded by Danny Green
