= List of flag bearers for Egypt at the Olympics =

Egypt at the Olympics
- IOC code: EGY
- NOC: Egyptian Olympic Committee
- Website: www.egyptianolympic.org (in Arabic and English)
- Medals: Gold 9 Silver 12 Bronze 20 Total 41

Summer appearances
- 1912; 1920; 1924; 1928; 1932; 1936; 1948; 1952; 1956; 1960–1964; 1968; 1972; 1976; 1980; 1984; 1988; 1992; 1996; 2000; 2004; 2008; 2012; 2016; 2020; 2024

Winter appearances
- 1984; 1988–2026

Other related appearances
- 1906 Intercalated Games –––– United Arab Republic (1960, 1964)

This is a list of flag bearers who have represented Egypt at the Olympics.

Flag bearers carry the national flag of their country at the opening ceremony of the Olympic Games.

== Flagbearers ==
Summer Olympics
Games	Athlete	Sport	Ref.
1912 Stockholm	Ahmed Hassanein	Fencing	
1920 Antwerp	Hamad Samy	Weightlifting	
1924 Paris			
1928 Amsterdam	Ibrahim Moustafa	Wrestling	
1932 Los Angeles	Did not participate		
1936 Berlin	Hussein Moukhtar	Weightlifting	
1948 London	Mahmoud Hassan	Wrestling	
1952 Helsinki	Ahmed Fouad Nessim	Water polo	
1956 Melbourne	Boycotted — did not participate		
1960 Rome	Did not participate		
1964 Tokyo	Did not participate		
1968 Mexico City			
1972 Munich	Kamal Kamel Mohammed	Basketball	
1976 Montreal			(Note: Flag bearer is unknown. Part of the 1976 Olympic boycott, Egypt withdrew from the games after the first few days of competition and after several Egyptian athletes already competed.)
1980 Moscow	Boycotted — did not participate		
1984 Los Angeles	Mohamed Sayed Soliman	Basketball	
1988 Seoul	Mohamed Khorshed	Shooting	
1992 Barcelona	Mohamed Khorshed	Shooting	
1996 Atlanta	Hosam Abdallah	Handball	
2000 Sydney	Yahia Rashwan	Taekwondo	
2004 Athens	Ali Ibrahim	Rowing	
2008 Beijing	Karam Gaber	Wrestling	
2012 London	Hesham Mesbah	Judo	
2016 Rio de Janeiro	Ahmed El-Ahmar	Handball	
2020 Tokyo	Alaaeldin Abouelkassem Hedaya Malak	Fencing Taekwondo	
2024 Paris	Sara Ahmed Ahmed El-Gendy	Weightlifting Modern pentathlon	

Winter Olympics
Games	Athlete	Sport	Ref.
1984 Sarajevo	Jamil El Reedy	Alpine skiing	

== See also ==
- Egypt at the Olympics
