= Western Samoa at the 1996 Summer Olympics =

- IOC code: WSM
- NOC: Samoa Association of Sports and National Olympic Committee Inc.

in Atlanta
- Competitors: 5
- Flag bearer: Bob Gasio
- Medals: Gold 0 Silver 0 Bronze 0 Total 0

Summer Olympics appearances (overview)
- 1984; 1988; 1992; 1996; 2000; 2004; 2008; 2012; 2016; 2020; 2024

Western Samoa competed at the 1996 Summer Olympics in Atlanta, United States.

== Results by event ==
=== Athletics ===
Men's Discus Throw

- Chris Mene

- Qualification — 51.28m (→ did not advance)

Women's Javelin Throw

- Iloai Suaniu

- Qualification — 38.08m (→ did not advance)

=== Boxing ===
Men's Middleweight (75 kg)

- Bob Gasio
  1. First Round — Lost to Ricardo Rodríguez (Brazil), 4-11

Men's Light Heavyweight (81 kg)

- Samuela Leu
  1. First Round — Lost to Lee Seung-bae (South Korea), 0-14

=== Weightlifting ===
Men's Middleweight (76 kg)

- Ofisa Ofisa 18th (out of 24 competitors)

Snatch 127.5 kg, Clean & Jerk 160 kg, Total 287.5 kg
