= Roy Jones Jr. vs. Reggie Johnson =

Boxing match

...Then There Was One
- Date: June 5, 1999
- Venue: Mississippi Coast Coliseum, Biloxi, Mississippi, U.S.
- Title(s) on the line: WBA, WBC and IBF light heavyweight titles

Tale of the tape
Boxer	Roy Jones Jr.	Reggie Johnson
Nickname	"Junior"	"Sweet"
Hometown	Pensacola, Florida, U.S.	Houston, Texas, U.S.
Pre-fight record	37–1 (31 KO)	39–5–1 (24 KO)
Age	30 years, 4 months	32 years, 9 months
Height	5 ft 11 in (180 cm)	5 ft 10 in (178 cm)
Weight	174 lb (79 kg)	171 lb (78 kg)
Style	Orthodox	Southpaw
Recognition	WBA and WBC; Light Heavyweight Champion; The Ring; No. 1 Ranked Light Heavyweight; The Ring No. 2 ranked pound-for-pound fighter 3-division world champion	IBF; Light Heavyweight Champion; The Ring; No. 3 Ranked Light Heavyweight; 2-division world champion

Result
- Jones Jr. defeats Johnson by unanimous decision

Roy Jones Jr. vs. Reggie Johnson, billed as ...Then There Was One, was a professional boxing match contested on June 5, 1999, for the WBA, WBC and IBF Light heavyweight championship.

== Background ==
After making two defences in his third reign as Light heavyweight champion and having been elevated by the WBC to their full champion (at the expense of previous champion Graciano Rocchigiani who was demoted to just an "interim" champion) Roy Jones Jr. signed to face IBF titleholder Reggie Johnson.

Johnson had been a training partner of Jones early on in his pro career but when his father and trainer Roy Jones Sr. decided to bring Johnson into his son's training program full time in 1992 it proved to be the catalyst for a bitter split between the two. "What my father didn't under stand was that it was inevitable that we would one day meet in the ring," Jones would recount during the build up to the bout "I knew it right away knew we were both headed for the championship and we'd have to settle it between us. If he wanted to bring someone in to get me ready for the race, it shouldn't have been the horse I was going to have to run against."

Johnson was a 10 to 1 underdog going into the bout.

== The fights ==
=== Undercard ===
The co featured bout was due to be a rematch between IBF super featherweight champion Robert Garcia and No. 2 ranked former IBO featherweight champion Derrick Gainer, however Garcia objected to the selection of three judges from the Gulf Coast region where Gainer (and Jones) are based. Despite a compromise being reached where a geography neutral judge would be flown in, Garcia opted to withdraw from the bout citing that the row had left him mentally drained. Gainer would instead face late replacement Donovan Carey whom he stopped in the 6th round.

=== Williams vs. Jirov ===
...Then There Was One:Arthur Williams vs. Vassiliy Jirov
- Title(s) on the line: IBF cruiserweight title

Tale of the tape
Boxer	Arthur Williams	Vassiliy Jirov
Nickname	"King"	"The Tiger"
Hometown	Pensacola, Florida, U.S.	Balkhash, Karaganda, Kazakhstan
Pre-fight record	30–4–1 (22 KO)	20–0 (18 KO)
Age	34 years, 6 months	25 years, 2 months
Height	6 ft 2 in (188 cm)	6 ft 2 in (188 cm)
Weight	188 lb (85 kg)	188 lb (85 kg)
Style	Orthodox	Southpaw
Recognition	IBF; Cruiserweight Champion	IBF; No. 4 Ranked Cruiserweight

Result
- Jirov defeats Williams by 7th round TKO

The replacement co featured bout saw IBF cruiserweight champion Arthur Williams make the first defence of his title against No. 4 ranked and 1996 Light heavyweight gold medallist Vassiliy Jirov. This would be the first cruiserweight title bout broadcast by HBO.

==== The fight ====
The bout would prove to be a slugfest with Jirov focusing on landing shots to the body of Williams while the champion landed with right hand leads. In the 3rd round the body punches appear to be affecting Williams as he threw fewer punches than he had in the first two rounds. Just over halfway through the round a hard left hand to the body forced Williams to his knees. He rose at the count of 9 and was able to survive the round. Jirov would take control of the bout as it progressed before dropping the champion again in the 7th with a solid left to the body. He again beat the count but as Jirov followed up with string of shot that sent Williams against the ropes referee Paul Sita had seen enough and waved it off. Jirov became Kazakhstan's first world champion and only the fourth to be born in the former USSR, after Kostya Tszyu, Orzubek Nazarov and Yuri Arbachakov.

At the time of the stoppage Jirov led on all three scorecards 58–55, 58–55 and 59–54. HBO's unofficial ringside scorer Harold Lederman had it 58–55 for Jirov.

According to CompuBox, Jirov landed 158 of 427 punches thrown (a 37.0% connect rate) against Williams landing 101 of 376 (a 26.9% connect rate).

==== Aftermath ====
When asked after the bout how he won Jirov said "Nobody could take those liver shots."

Preceded by vs. Art Jimmerson	Arthur Williams's bouts 5 June 1999	Succeeded by vs. Dan Ward
Preceded by vs. Onebo Maxime	Vassiliy Jirov's bouts 5 June 1999	Succeeded by vs. Dale Brown

=== Main Event ===
Johnson would start the bout aggressively and within the first 2 minutes Jones dropped him with a straight right hand. He got up quickly, but an unintentional head butt had also opened up a small cut along Johnson's right eye. With 8 seconds to go in the 3rd round Jones countered a right with a left-right combination on Johnson's chin that dropped Johnson for the second time. As the bout progressed Johnson was only able to fight in spurts, otherwise being forced to back away and cover up. Whenever he was able to land on the inside, Jones countered with jabs and uppercuts that forced him back. Johnson did land a clean right on Jones' chin in the 7th but he was unable to follow up. There were some boos from the crowd late on when Jones didn't press his attack in order to score a stoppage.

As a result, the fight went the distance and all three judges, Paul Sita, Cova Jesus and Chuck Hassock, scored it a 120–106 shutout for Jones, as did HBO's unofficial scorer Harold Lederman. According to CompuBox, Jones landed 273 of 520 punches thrown (a 52.5% connect rate) against Johnson landing just 49 of 380 (a 12.9% connect rate).

With the victory Jones became the first man to hold all three major light heavyweight belts at once since Michael Spinks in 1985 and the first in any weight division since Pernell Whitaker in 1992. His status as "undisputed" was questioned however, as unbeaten WBO titleholder Dariusz Michalczewski was recognized the Lineal champion following his June 1997 victory over Virgil Hill, despite being controversially stripped of his two major belts shortly afterwards.

== Aftermath ==
Speaking after the fight Jones said "I hope every one had as good a time as I did, because I had a damn good time." He also defenced his refusal to go for the knockout saying "I could have pressured him and knocked him out, but why would I take a chance on him getting a lucky punch and knocking me out? That's not very businesslike."

Johnson meanwhile praised Jones' speed saying "Roy was real quick, I didn't have time to counter his punches. Coming into the fight, I knew I had to give a lot and take a lot of punches. He does a lot of things wrong in there, but his hand speed makes up for it. I tried to time him, but I was unable to do it."

A match between Jones and Graciano Rocchigiani was scheduled for November 1999 after Rocchigiani had filed a lawsuit against Jones' promotional companies M&M Sports and Square Ring Promotions Inc due to Jones' reluctance to face him. However, in October the match was abruptly cancelled by promoter Murad Muhammad after Rocchigiani "missed" a press conference, despite having received two certified documents that he was in training camp over in Germany and didn't want jetlag affecting his preparation. Originally Michael Nunn was set to replace Rocchigiani however the bout was later rearranged for January 15 but Jones would replace Rocchigiani once again, this time with David Telesco.

After initially threatening to strip Jones belt if he didn't arrange another match with Rocchigiani, the WBC stripped Rocchigiani outright and removed him from their rankings due to inactivity. This prompted the former champion to continue legal action against the WBC with ending with him being awarded $31m by a federal judge. Rocchigiani would agree to the WBC's pleas for a smaller 10-year payment plan so the WBC could avoid bankruptcy.

== Undercard ==
Confirmed bouts:

Winner	Loser	Weight division/title belt(s) disputed	Result
(Kazakhstan) Vassiliy Jirov	(United States) Arthur Williams	IBF World Cruiserweight title	7th-round TKO
Preliminary bouts
(United States) Derrick Gainer	(United States) Donovan Carey	vacant NABA Interim Super featherweight title	6th-round TKO
(Philippines) Gerry Peñalosa	(Panama) Ramon Jose Hurtado	vacant NABA Super Flyweight title	2nd-round KO
(United States) Salvador Jasso	(United States) Gary Richardson	Lightweight (6 rounds)	5th round DQ
(United States) Michael Stewart	(United States) Jerry Smith	Welterweight (6 rounds)	Unanimous decision
(Nigeria) Daniel Attah	(United States) Kareem Braithwaite	Lightweight (6 rounds)	1st-round TKO

== Broadcasting ==
Country	Broadcaster
Malaysia	Astro SuperSport
Philippines	IBC 13
United States	HBO

Preceded by vs. Richard Frazier	Roy Jones Jr.'s bouts 5 June 1999	Succeeded by ~~vs. Graciano Rocchigiani~~ vs. David Telesco
Preceded by vs. Will Taylor	Reggie Johnson's bouts 5 June 1999	Succeeded by vs. Earl Butler
