= Enrique Flores (boxer) =

Puerto Rican boxer

Personal information
- Nationality: Puerto Rican
- Born: 23 November 1968 (age 56)

Sport
- Sport: Boxing

Enrique Flores (born 23 November 1968) is a Puerto Rican boxer. He competed in the men's light heavyweight event at the 1996 Summer Olympics.
