= Inmaculada Vicent =

Spanish judoka (born 1967)

Personal information
- Nationality: Spanish
- Born: 9 December 1967 (age 58) Madrid, Spain

Sport
- Sport: Judo

Inmaculada Vicent (born 9 December 1967) is a Spanish judoka. She competed in the women's heavyweight event at the 1992 Summer Olympics.
