= Anne Åkerblom =

Finnish judoka (born 1960)

Personal information
- Nationality: Finnish
- Born: 15 October 1960 (age 64); Helsinki, Finland
- Occupation: Judoka

Sport
- Sport: Judo

Profile at external databases
- JudoInside.com: 2364

Anne Carita Åkerblom (born 15 October 1960) is a Finnish former judoka. She competed in the women's heavyweight event at the 1992 Summer Olympics.
