= Sybrand Botes =

South African boxer

Personal information
- Nationality: South African
- Born: 16 September 1976 (age 48); Vanderbijlpark, South Africa

Sport
- Sport: Boxing

Sybrand Botes (born 16 September 1976) is a South African boxer. He competed in the men's light heavyweight event at the 1996 Summer Olympics.
