= Heba Hefny =

Egyptian judoka (born 1972)

Personal information
- Native name: هبة حفني
- Nationality: Egyptian
- Born: October 16, 1972 (age 53)
- Occupation: Judoka

Sport
- Sport: Judo
Medal record
Representing Egypt
African Judo Championships
Silver medal – second place	South Africa 1996	+72 kg
Silver medal – second place	South Africa 1996	Open Weight
Gold medal – first place	Dakar 1998	+78 kg
Gold medal – first place	Johannesburg 1999	+78 kg
Gold medal – first place	Johannesburg 1999	Open Weight
Gold medal – first place	Algier 2000	+78 kg
Silver medal – second place	Algier 2000	Open Weight
Gold medal – first place	Cairo 2002	+78 kg
Gold medal – first place	Cairo 2002	Open Weight
Continental Open
Silver medal – second place	Warsaw 1994	+72 kg
Gold medal – first place	Warsaw 1995	+72 kg
Silver medal – second place	Warsaw 1998	+78 kg
Bronze medal – third place	Roma 2000	+78 kg
Silver medal – second place	Rotterdam 2000	+78 kg
Silver medal – second place	Leonding 2001	+78 kg
Bronze medal – third place	Prague 2002	+78 kg
International Tournaments
Bronze medal – third place	Birmingham 1994	+72 kg
Gold medal – first place	Paris 1994	+72 kg
Silver medal – second place	Birmingham 1999	+78 kg
Bronze medal – third place	Ottawa 2001	+78 kg

Profile at external databases
- IJF: 53181
- JudoInside.com: 2257
- Updated on 29 July 2017

Heba Hefny (Egyptian Arabic: هبه حفنى; born October 16, 1972) is an Egyptian Olympic judoka. She represented Egypt in 3 Summer Olympics tournaments; 1992, 1996 and 2000.

== Olympic participation ==
=== Barcelona 1992 ===
Judo – Women's Heavy Weight

Final Standing: 20th T.

=== Atlanta 1996 ===
Judo – Women's Heavy Weight

Athlete	Event	Preliminary	Round of 32	Round of 16	Quarterfinals	Semifinals	Repechage 1	Repechage 2	Repechage 3	Final / BM	
Athlete	Event	Opposition Result	Opposition Result	Opposition Result	Opposition Result	Opposition Result	Opposition Result	Opposition Result	Opposition Result	Opposition Result	Rank
Heba Hefny	−72 kg	—N/a	—N/a	BYE	Burnett (AUS); W	Maksymowa (POL); L	Cicot (FRA); L	did not advance			

Final Standing: 9th T.

=== Sydney 2000 ===
Judo – Women's Heavy Weight

Athlete	Event	Preliminary	Round of 32	Round of 16	Quarterfinals	Semifinals	Repechage 1	Repechage 2	Repechage 3	Final / BM	
Athlete	Event	Opposition Result	Opposition Result	Opposition Result	Opposition Result	Opposition Result	Opposition Result	Opposition Result	Opposition Result	Opposition Result	Rank
Heba Hefny	+78 kg	—N/a	BYE	Köppen (GER); L	did not advance		Prokofyeva (UKR); W	Cicot (FRA); L	did not advance		

Final Standing: 9th T.
