= Claudia Weber =

German judoka (born 1967)

Personal information
- Nationality: German
- Born: 6 November 1967 (age 57); Frechen, West Germany

Sport
- Sport: Judo

Claudia Weber (born 6 November 1967) is a German former judoka. She competed in the women's heavyweight event at the 1992 Summer Olympics.
