= Sangita Mehta =

Indian judoka (born 1966)

Sangeeta Mehta
Personal information
- Nationality: Indian
- Born: 9 September 1966 (age 58)

Sport
- Sport: Judo

Sangeeta Mehta (born 9 September 1966) is an Indian judoka. She competed in the women's heavyweight event at the 1992 Summer Olympics.
