= Johanna Hagn =

German judoka (born 1973)

Personal information
- Born: 27 January 1973 (age 53)
- Occupation: Judoka

Sport
- Country: Germany
- Sport: Judo
- Weight class: +72 kg, +78 kg

Achievements and titles
- Olympic Games: (bronze) (1996)
- World Champ.: (gold) (1993)
- European Champ.: (gold) (1997)
Medal record
Women's judo
Representing Germany
Olympic Games
Bronze medal – third place	1996 Atlanta	+72 kg
World Championships
Gold medal – first place	1993 Hamilton	+72 kg
European Championships
Gold medal – first place	1997 Oostende	+72 kg
Silver medal – second place	1996 The Hague	+72 kg
Bronze medal – third place	2000 Wrocław	+78 kg
European Junior Championships
Silver medal – second place	1991 Pieksämäki	+72 kg

Profile at external databases
- IJF: 53402
- JudoInside.com: 237
- Updated on 4 June 2023

Johanna Hagn (born 27 January 1973 in Wolfratshausen, Upper Bavaria) is a German judoka.

She won a bronze medal in the heavyweight (+72 kg) division at the 1996 Summer Olympics.
