= Son Hyeon-mi =

South Korean judoka (born 1972)

Personal information
- Nationality: South Korean
- Born: 2 November 1972 (age 53) South Gyeongsang Province, South Korea

Sport
- Sport: Judo
Medal record
Representing South Korea
Asian Games
Bronze medal – third place	1994 Hiroshima	+72 kg
Summer Universiade
Gold medal – first place	1995 Fukuoka	Team
Bronze medal – third place	1995 Fukuoka	Open

Son Hyeon-mi (born 2 November 1972) is a South Korean judoka. She competed in the women's heavyweight event at the 1996 Summer Olympics.
