= Yusuf Öztürk (boxer) =

Turkish boxer

Personal information
- Full name: Yusuf Öztürk
- Nationality: Turkey
- Born: 1 August 1973 (age 53) İkizdere, Rize
- Height: 1.84 m (6 ft 1/2 in)
- Weight: 81 kg (179 lb)

Sport
- Sport: Boxing
- Weight class: Light Heavyweight
Medal record
European Amateur Championships
Bronze medal – third place	1996 Vejle	Light Heavyweight

Yusuf Öztürk (born 1 August 1973, İkizdere, Rize Province) is a Turkish light heavyweight boxer who competed at the 1996 Summer Olympics in Atlanta. Participating in the 30 March–7 April 1996 European Amateur Boxing Championships in the Danish town of Vejle, he defeated Zoltán Béres of Hungary and Thomas Ulrich of Germany (10–15), ultimately sharing the bronze medal with Russia's Dmitry Vybornov. Three-and-a-half months later, at the Olympics, he was outpointed 7–15 in the first round of men's light-heavyweight division (– 81 kg) by the reigning European champion, Pietro Aurino of Italy and ended the Games tied for 17th place with fourteen other light heavyweights.
