= Supatra Yompakdee =

Thai judoka

Personal information
- Nationality: Thai
- Born: 22 May 1962 (age 62)

Sport
- Sport: Judo

Supatra Yompakdee (born 22 May 1962) is a Thai judoka. She competed in the women's heavyweight event at the 1992 Summer Olympics.
