= Paul Mbongo =

Cameroonian boxer (born 1971)

Personal information
- Nationality: Cameroonian
- Born: 8 January 1971 (age 54)

Sport
- Sport: Boxing

Paul Mbongo (born 8 January 1971) is a Cameroonian boxer. He competed in the men's light heavyweight event at the 1996 Summer Olympics.
