= Amro El-Geioushy =

Egyptian handball player (born 1971)

Personal information
- Nationality: Egyptian
- Born: 1 July 1971 (age 53)

Sport
- Sport: Handball

Amro El-Geioushy (born 1 July 1971) is an Egyptian handball player. He competed at the 1996 Summer Olympics and the 2000 Summer Olympics.
