= Ahmed El-Awady =

Egyptian handball player

Ahmed Mostafa Walid El-Awady (born 3 January 1970) is an Egyptian former handball player who competed at the Olympics in 1992 and 1996.

In October 2015, he was working as an Uber driver in Charlotte, North Carolina. He drove Liza Minnelli 200 miles on Uber to not miss her concert after her flight had been cancelled.

== Career ==
Ahmed played for the Egyptian national team in his international career. He appeared for the 1992 Summer Olympics as part of the Men's team. He also appeared in the 1996 Summer Olympics where his team was placed in the 6th position.
