= Eissportzentrum Westfalenhallen =

Indoor sporting arena in Dortmund, Germany

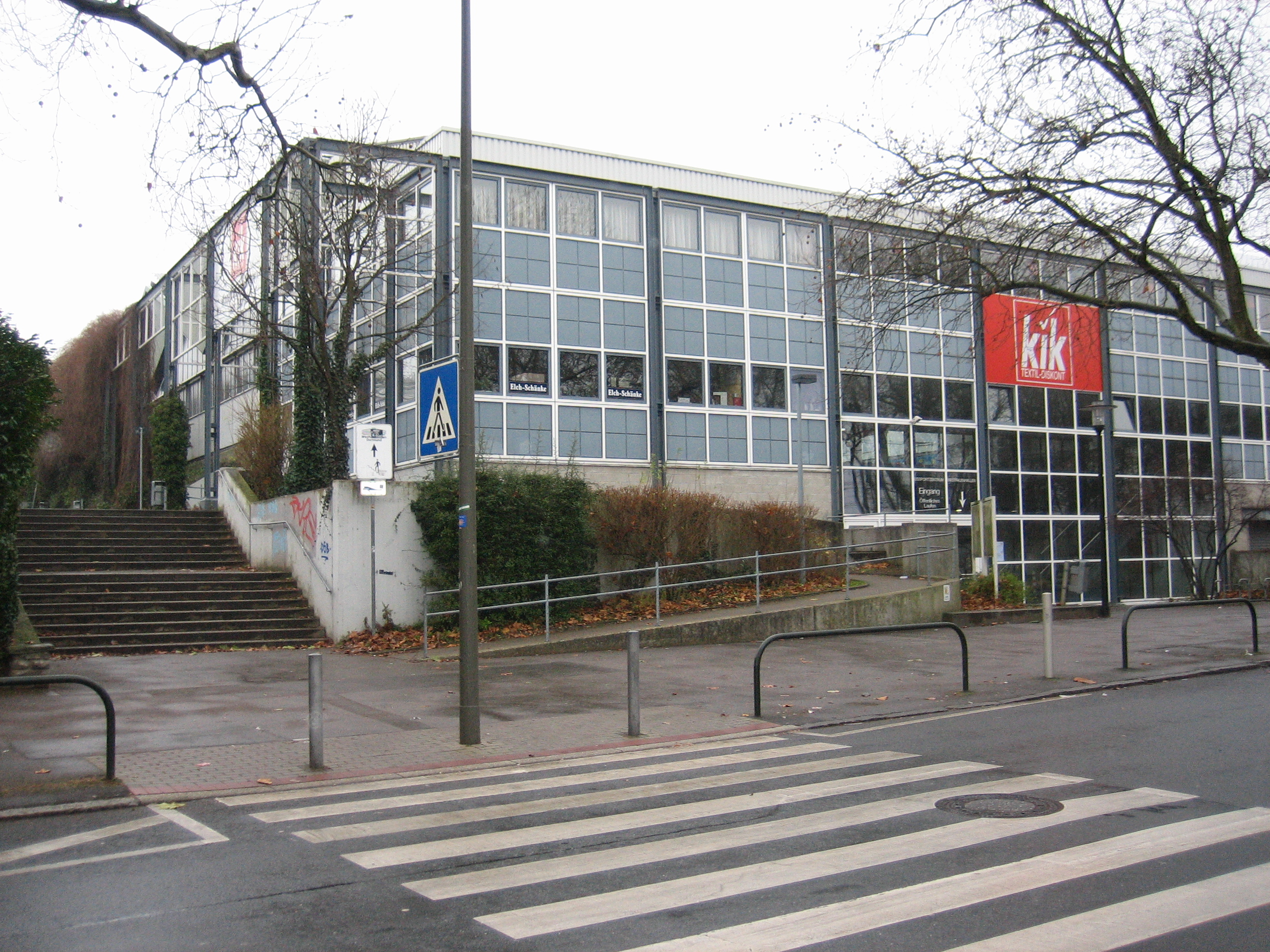
- Exterior view of venue (c.2008)
- Interactive map of Eissportzentrum Westfalenhallen
- Full name: Eissportzentrum Westfalenhallen Dortmund
- Address: Strobelallee 32; 44139 Dortmund; Germany
- Coordinates: 51.4952°N 7.4583°E
- Owner: Westfalenhallen Dortmund GmbH
- Capacity: 5,000

Construction
- Opened: 1952
- Renovated: 1992

Website
- Venue Website

Eissportzentrum Westfalenhallen is an indoor sporting arena at the Strobelallee in Dortmund, Germany. It is primarily used for ice hockey and is the home arena of Eisadler Dortmund, and of the figure skating club ERC Westfalen. It was opened in 1952 and can accommodate 5,000 spectators, including 3,998 standing and 1,002 seats.

== See also ==
- List of indoor arenas in Germany
