= Edilene Aparecida =

Brazilian judoka (born 1971)

Medal record
Women's Judo
Representing Brazil
Pan American Games
Bronze medal – third place	1991 Havana	Heavyweight

Edilene Aparecida Andrade (born March 14, 1971, in Ipatinga, Minas Gerais) is a female judoka from Brazil. She competed for her native country at the 1992 Summer Olympics in Barcelona, Spain, where she was defeated in the second round of the repêchage. Aparecida won a bronze medal at the 1991 Pan American Games in the Women's Heavyweight (+ 72 kg).
