= Yasser Mahmoud (handballer) =

Egyptian handball player

Yasser Mahmoud (born February 23, 1964) is an Egyptian handball player. He competed for Egypt's national team at the 1992 and 1996 Summer Olympics.
