= Khaled Mahmoud =

Egyptian handball player

Personal information
- Nationality: Egyptian
- Born: 15 December 1969 (age 56)

Sport
- Sport: Handball

Khaled Mahmoud (born 15 December 1969) is an Egyptian handball player. He competed in the men's tournament at the 1996 Summer Olympics.
