= Estela Rodríguez =

Cuban judoka (1967–2022)

Personal information
- Full name: Estela Rodríguez Villanueva
- Born: 17 November 1967 Santiago de Cuba, Cuba
- Died: 10 April 2022 (aged 54) Havana, Cuba
- Occupation: Judoka

Sport
- Country: Cuba
- Sport: Judo
- Weight class: +72 kg, Open

Achievements and titles
- Olympic Games: (silver) (1992, 1996)
- World Champ.: (1989)
- Pan American Champ.: (1990, 1992)
Medal record
Women's judo
Representing Cuba
Olympic Games
Silver medal – second place	1992 Barcelona	+72 kg
Silver medal – second place	1996 Atlanta	+72 kg
World Championships
Gold medal – first place	1989 Belgrade	Open
Silver medal – second place	1991 Barcelona	Open
Bronze medal – third place	1995 Chiba	Open
Pan American Games
Gold medal – first place	1991 Havana	Open
Gold medal – first place	1991 Havana	+72 kg
Silver medal – second place	1987 Indianapolis	Open
Bronze medal – third place	1987 Indianapolis	+72 kg
Pan American Championships
Gold medal – first place	1990 Caracas	+72 kg
Gold medal – first place	1992 Ontario	+72 kg

Profile at external databases
- IJF: 62058
- JudoInside.com: 990
- Updated on 4 June 2023

Estela Rodríguez Villanueva (Note: In this Spanish name, the first or paternal surname is Rodríguez and the second or maternal family name is Villanueva.) (17 November 1967 – 10 April 2022) was a Cuban judoka. She won silver medals at the 1992 and 1996 Summer Olympics, both in the Half Heavyweight (over 72 kg) category. She returned a positive test for the banned diuretic drug called furosemide at the 1996 Olympics, but was only issued with a reprimand, and allowed to keep her medals. Rodríguez died in Havana on 10 April 2022, at the age of 54.
