= Yahia Rashwan =

Egyptian taekwondo practitioner

Personal information
- Nationality: Egyptian
- Born: 20 February 1969 (age 56)

Sport
- Sport: Taekwondo

Yahia Rashwan (born 20 February 1969) is an Egyptian former taekwondo practitioner. He competed in the men's +80 kg event at the 2000 Summer Olympics.

He also won a silver medal at the 1989 World Games and 1993 World Games.

Olympic Games
Preceded by Hosam Abdallah	Olympic flagbearer for Egypt; 2000 Sydney	Succeeded by Ali Ibrahim
