= Lee Seung-bae =

Korean male boxer (born 1971)

Personal information
- Born: May 10, 1971 (age 55)
Medal record
Men's Boxing
Olympic Games
Silver medal – second place	1996 Atlanta	Light Heavyweight
Bronze medal – third place	1992 Barcelona	Middleweight
Asian Games
Gold medal – first place	1994 Hiroshima	Middleweight
Silver medal – second place	1998 Bangkok	Light Heavyweight

Lee Seung-Bae (born May 10, 1971) was a South Korean amateur boxer, who won a middleweight bronze medal at the 1992 Summer Olympics for Korea, followed by a light heavyweight silver medal at the 1996 Summer Olympics.

== Career ==
At the 1996 Summer Olympics, Lee captured the silver medal in light heavyweight. Lee lost to future IBF Cruiserweight Champion Vassili Jirov of Kazakhstan in the final bout. However, he beat Freddy Rojas of Cuba, who was the only fighter to hold a victory over Félix Savón, in round of 16, and defeated Stipe Drvis of Croatia, who became a WBA Light Heavyweight Champion in 2007, in the quarterfinal match.

== Post career ==
In 2008, Lee earned doctorate in sports & physical education from Konkuk University. He is an assistant coach of the South Korea national amateur boxing team.

== Results ==
1992 Summer Olympics
Event	Round	Result	Opponent	Score
Middleweight	First	Win	(Czechoslovakia) Michal Franek	6–2
Middleweight	Second	Win	(Chile) Ricardo Araneda	12–8
Middleweight	Quarterfinal	Win	(Indonesia) Albert Papilaya	15–3
Middleweight	Semifinal	Loss	(Cuba) Ariel Hernández	1–14

1996 Summer Olympics
Event	Round	Result	Opponent	Score
Light heavyweight	First	Win	(Samoa) Samuela Leu	14–0
Light heavyweight	Second	Win	(Cuba) Freddy Rojas	13–9
Light heavyweight	Quarterfinal	Win	(Croatia) Stipe Drvis	14–11
Light heavyweight	Semifinal	Win	(Germany) Thomas Ulrich	12–8
Light heavyweight	Final	Loss	(Kazakhstan) Vassili Jirov	4–17
