= Mohamed Mahmoud (boxer) =

Egyptian boxer

Personal information
- Nationality: Egyptian
- Born: 10 June 1971 (age 54)

Sport
- Sport: Boxing

Mohamed Mahmoud (born 10 June 1971) is an Egyptian boxer. He competed in the men's light heavyweight event at the 1996 Summer Olympics.
