= Jean-Louis Mandengue =

French boxer

Personal information
- Full name: Jean-Louis Mandengue
- Nationality: France
- Born: September 15, 1971 (age 54) Paris
- Height: 1.86 m (6 ft 1 in)
- Weight: 81 kg (179 lb)

Sport
- Sport: Boxing
- Weight class: Light Heavyweight
- Club: Aulnay 93
Medal record
European Amateur Championships
Silver medal – second place	1996 Vejle	Light Heavyweight

Jean-Louis Mandengue (born September 15, 1971, in Paris) is a retired male boxer from France. At the 1996 Summer Olympics in Atlanta, Georgia, he fought in the men's light-heavyweight division (– 81 kg) and lost to Brazil's Daniel Bispo in the second round of the tournament.
