= Gohar Nabil =

Egyptian handball player

Gohar Nabil (born 31 January 1973) is an Egyptian handball player. He competed for Egypt's national team at the 1992, 1996, 2000 Summer Olympics.
