= Mohamed Sayed Soliman =

Egyptian basketball player (born 1958)

Personal information
- Nationality: Egyptian
- Born: 2 November 1958 (age 66)

Sport
- Sport: Basketball

Mohamed Sayed Soliman (born 2 November 1958) is an Egyptian basketball player. He competed in the men's tournament at the 1984 Summer Olympics.

Olympic Games
Preceded by Jamil El Reedy	Flagbearer for Egypt; Los Angeles 1984	Succeeded by Mohamed Khorshed
