= Christine Cicot =

French judoka (born 1964)

Personal information
- Born: 10 September 1964 (age 62) Libourne, Gironde, France
- Occupation: Judoka

Sport
- Country: France
- Sport: Judo
- Weight class: +72 kg, +78 kg, Open

Achievements and titles
- Olympic Games: (bronze) (1996)
- World Champ.: (gold) (1997)
- European Champ.: (gold) (1990)
Medal record
Women's judo
Representing France
Olympic Games
Bronze medal – third place	1996 Atlanta	+72 kg
World Championships
Gold medal – first place	1997 Paris	+72 kg
European Championships
Gold medal – first place	1990 Frankfurt	+72 kg
Silver medal – second place	1984 Pirmasens	‍–‍72 kg
Silver medal – second place	1994 Gdansk	Open
Silver medal – second place	1995 Birmingham	+72 kg
Bronze medal – third place	1986 London	Open
Bronze medal – third place	1998 Oviedo	+78 kg
Bronze medal – third place	2000 Wrocław	+78 kg

Profile at external databases
- IJF: 53182
- JudoInside.com: 347
- Updated on 4 June 2023

Christine Cicot (French: [kʁistin siko]; born 10 September 1964 in Libourne, Gironde) is a French judoka, Olympic medalist and world champion. She won a bronze medal in the heavyweight (+72 kg) division at the 1996 Summer Olympics in Atlanta. She became world champion in Paris 1997.
