= Ali Ibrahim =

Egyptian rower (1971–2010)

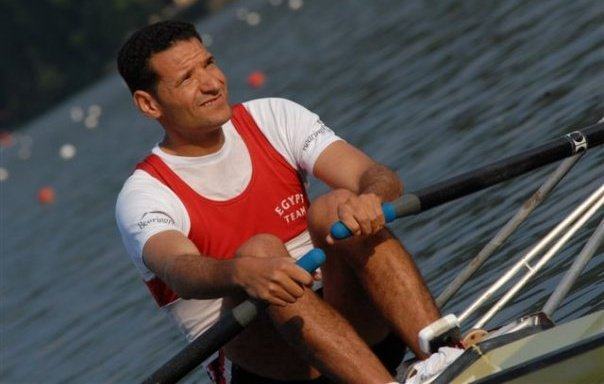

Personal information
- Nationality: Egyptian
- Born: 19 December 1971 Al Sharqia, Egypt
- Died: 28 March 2010 (aged 38) Cairo, Egypt
- Height: 1.96 m (6 ft 5 in)
- Weight: 85 kg (187 lb)

Sport
- Country: Egypt
- Sport: Rowing
- Event(s): Men's single scull, quads, eights
- Club: Police Rowing Club, Al-Qahira

Achievements and titles
- Personal best: Men's single scull: 6:52.11 (1996)
Medal record
Men's rowing
Representing Egypt
World Rowing Cups
Silver medal – second place	1997 Munich	Single sculls
Silver medal – second place	1997 Paris	Single sculls
Silver medal – second place	1998 Hazewinkel	Single sculls
Bronze medal – third place	1998 Munich	Single sculls
Bronze medal – third place	2002 Hazewinkel	Men's eights
- Updated on 2 January 2013

Ali Ibrahim (Egyptian Arabic: على ابراهيم, 19 December 1971 – 28 March 2010) was an Egyptian rower who competed at four Olympic Games. He also won multiple World Rowing Cup medals, including three silver medals and two bronze medals.

== Life and rowing career ==
Ali Ibrahim was born on 19 December 1971, in Al Sharqia, Egypt. He began rowing in 1990.

He became the most successful Egyptian rower, when he finished 8th in the men's single scull at the 1996 Olympic Games in Atlanta, Georgia, in the United States, and 6th at the 1997 World Championships in Aiguebelette, France. He competed in the single again at the 2000 Olympic Games in Sydney, Australia, and although he moved into team boats, rowing in the eight and quad for the World Championships, he competed in the single scull again at the 2004 and 2008 Olympic Games in Athens and Beijing, respectively. He was the flag bearer for Egypt in the 2004 Summer Olympics opening ceremony.

== Death ==
He died on 28 March 2010, when a speeding car hit him as he was crossing Salah Salem Street in Nasr City in Cairo, Egypt, on his way to train the Egyptian national rowing team.

== Achievements and titles ==
- World Cup Medals: 3 silver medals, 2 bronze medals

=== Olympic Games ===
- 1996 – 8th Atlanta – Single Sculls
- 2000 – 13th Sydney – Single Sculls
- 2004 – 14th Athens – Single Sculls
- 2008 – 18th Beijing – Single Sculls

=== World Cups ===
- 1995 – 6th WCp 1 – Hazewinkel, Single Sculls
- 1995 – 6th WCp 4 – Paris, Single Sculls
- 1995 – 10th WCp 4F – Lucerne, Single Sculls
- 1997 – 2nd WCp 1 – Munich, Single Sculls
- 1997 – 2nd WCp 2 – Paris, Single Sculls
- 1997 – 6th WCp 3F – Lucerne, Single Sculls
- 1998 – 3rd WCp 1 – Munich, Single Sculls
- 1998 – 2nd WCp 2 – Hazewinkel, Single Sculls
- 1998 – 4th WCp 3F – Lucerne, Single Sculls
- 1999 – 5th WCp 1 – Hazewinkel, Single Sculls
- 1999 – 4th WCp 2 – Vienna, Single Sculls
- 1999 – 9th WCp 3F – Lucerne, Single Sculls
- 2000 – 4th WCp 1 – Munich, Single Sculls
- 2000 – 9th WCp 2 – Vienna, Single Sculls
- 2000 – 7th WCp 3F – Lucerne, Single Sculls
- 2001 – 7th WCp 1 – New Jersey, Single Sculls
- 2002 – 3rd WCp 1 – Hazewinkel, Men's Eights
- 2002 – 7th WCp 2 – Lucerne, Men's Eights
- 2003 – 7th WCp 1 – Milan, Coxless four
- 2003 – 14th WCp 3F – Lucerne, Coxless four
- 2004 – 7th WCp 2 – Munich, Single Sculls
- 2006 – 7th WCp 2 – Poznan, Men's Eights
- 2006 – 9th WCp 3F – Lucerne, Men's Eights
- 2007 – 12th WCp 2 – Amsterdam, Quad scull
- 2008 – 8th WCp 2 – Lucerne, Quad scull
- 2008 – 9th WCp 3F – Poznan, Quad scull

=== World Championships ===
- 1995 – 17th – Tampere, Single Sculls
- 1997 – 6th – Aiguebelette, Single Sculls
- 1998 – 6th – Cologne, Single Sculls
- 1999 – 8th – St. Catharines, Single Sculls
- 2002 – 9th – Seville, Men's Eights
- 2003 – 12th – Milan, Men's Eights
- 2006 – 15th – Eton Dorney, Quad scull
- 2007 – 18th – Munich, Quad scull

Olympic Games
Preceded by Yahia Rashwan	Flagbearer for Egypt; Athens 2004	Succeeded by Karam Gaber
