= Hosam Abdallah =

Egyptian handball player

Hosam Abdallah (Egyptian Arabic: حسام عبد الله; born 8 September 1966) is an Egyptian handball player. He competed for Egypt's national team at the 1992 and 1996 Summer Olympics.

Olympic Games
Preceded by Mohamed Khorshed	Flagbearer for Egypt; Atlanta 1996	Succeeded by Yahia Rashwan
