= Rick Timperi =

Australian boxer

Personal information
- Nationality: Australian
- Born: 30 May 1967 (age 58); Rome, Italy

Sport
- Sport: Boxing

Rick Timperi (born 30 May 1967) is an Australian boxer. He competed at the 1992 Summer Olympics and the 1996 Summer Olympics.
