= Mohamed Khorshed =

Egyptian sport shooter

Mohamed Khorshed (born 29 October 1950), is an Egyptian skeet shooter who competed at five Summer Olympics from 1984 to 2000. He is the first and only Egyptian to compete at five Olympics, as of 2010. He is also the first African to compete at five Olympics. He also earned gold at the 1993 African Shooting Championships and bronze at the 1995 edition.

He won the gold medal in skeet at the 1995 All-Africa Games in Harare.

== Olympic results ==
| Event | 1984 | 1988 | 1992 | 1996 | 2000 |
|---|---|---|---|---|---|
| Skeet (mixed) | T-53rd | T-33rd | T-33rd | Not held | |
| Skeet (men) | Not held | | | T-45th | T-23rd |

== See also ==
- List of athletes with the most appearances at Olympic Games

Olympic Games
| Preceded by Mohamed Sayed Soliman | Flagbearer for Egypt; Seoul 1988; Barcelona 1992 | Succeeded by Hosam Abdallah |
