= Ismael Koné (boxer) =

Swedish boxer

Personal information
- Nationality: Swedish
- Born: 5 June 1974 (age 50); Malmö, Sweden

Sport
- Sport: Boxing

Ismael Koné (born 5 June 1974) is a Swedish boxer. He competed in the men's light heavyweight event at the 1996 Summer Olympics.
