= Samuela Leuii =

Samoan boxer

Personal information
- Nationality: Samoan
- Born: 4 June 1972 (age 52)

Sport
- Sport: Boxing

Samuela Leuii (born 4 June 1972) is a Samoan boxer. He competed in the men's light heavyweight event at the 1996 Summer Olympics.
