= Heidi Burnett =

Australian judoka

Personal information
- Nationality: Australian
- Born: 16 October 1961 (age 63); Sydney, Australia

Sport
- Sport: Judo

Heidi Burnett (born 16 October 1961) is an Australian judoka. She competed in the women's heavyweight event at the 1996 Summer Olympics.
