= Éva Gránitz =

Hungarian judoka

Personal information
- Nationality: Hungarian
- Born: 25 April 1966 (age 58); Siófok, Hungary

Sport
- Sport: Judo

Éva Gránitz (born 25 April 1966) is a Hungarian judoka. She competed at the 1992 Summer Olympics and the 1996 Summer Olympics.
