= Pietro Aurino =

Italian boxer (born 1976)

Personal information
- Full name: Pietro Aurino
- Nickname: The Killer
- Nationality: Italy
- Born: November 16, 1976 (age 49) Torre Annunziata, Naples, Italy
- Height: 1.80 m (5 ft 11 in)
- Weight: 81 kg (179 lb)

Sport
- Sport: Boxing
- Weight class: Light Heavyweight; Cruiserweight
- Club: Lucio Zurlo
Medal record
European Amateur Championships
Gold medal – first place	1996 Vejle	Light Heavyweight

Pietro Aurino (born November 16, 1976) is an Italian retired boxer. Nicknamed The Killer, he represented his native country at the 1996 Summer Olympics in Atlanta, Georgia, where he was stopped in the second round of the men's light-heavyweight division (– 81 kg) by Kazakhstan's eventual gold medalist Vassili Jirov. He challenged once for the WBO world cruiserweight title in 2000.

== Professional boxing record ==
38 Wins (16 knockouts, 22 decisions) 3 Losses (3 knockouts)
Result	Record	Opponent	Type	Round	Date	Location	Notes
Win	11-3	(Hungary) Adrian Rajkai	PTS	6	24/03/2007	Alsterdorfer Sporthalle, Hamburg, Germany	
Loss	16-0	(Germany) Marco Huck	TKO	2	16/12/2006	BigBox, Kempten, Germany	EBU EU Cruiserweight Title.
Win	1-3	(Latvia) Romans Dabolins	UD	8	01/08/2006	Forte Michelangelo, Civitavecchia, Italy	
Win	11-14-1	(France) Christopher Robert	PTS	8	19/05/2006	Palazzetto dello Sport, Abano Terme, Italy	
Win	29-28-2	(Hungary) Zoltán Béres	PTS	6	10/03/2006	Palasport, Bergamo, Italy	
Win	17-19-3	(Algeria) Ramdane Serdjane	PTS	6	22/07/2005	Campione d'Italia, Italy	
Win	6-9	(Belarus) Artem Solomko	TKO	4	17/06/2005	PalaLido, Milan, Italy	
Win	8-18	(Montenegro) Radoslav Milutinović	TKO	6	20/05/2005	Palazzetto dello Sport, Santa Marinella, Italy	Referee stopped the bout at 0:01 of the sixth round.
Win	17-4-1	(Tanzania) Joseph Marwa	TD	8	18/12/2004	Oberfrankenhalle, Bayreuth, Germany	WBC International Light Heavyweight Title.
Win	5-3-1	(Romania) Adrian Pop	TKO	7	23/10/2004	Tempodrom, Berlin, Germany	Referee stopped the bout at 0:59 of the seventh round.
Win	17-14-1	(Algeria) Ramdane Serdjane	PTS	10	24/07/2004	Civitavecchia, Italy	
Win	38-7-3	(France) Alain Simon	TKO	6	13/04/2004	Cava Manara, Italy	
Win	12-9-1	(Argentina) Sergi Martin Beaz	TKO	2	27/03/2004	PalaLottomatica, Rome, Italy	
Win	24-3-1	(Denmark) Jesper Kristiansen	UD	12	31/05/2003	Aversa, Italy	EBU Cruiserweight Title. 118-110, 119-110, 119-110.
Win	23-1-1	(Italy) Vincenzo Rossitto	TKO	10	22/02/2003	San Giuseppe Vesuviano, Italy	EBU Cruiserweight Title.
Win	21-5-4	(Turkey) Turan Bağcı	TKO	5	05/11/2002	Villa Erba, Cernobbio, Italy	EBU Cruiserweight Title. Referee stopped the bout at 1:51 of the fifth round.
Win	14-1-1	(Italy) Paolo Ferrara	UD	10	24/08/2002	Monte San Giovanni Campano, Italy	EBU EU Cruiserweight Title. 98-90, 97-91, 97-91.
Win	38-8	(Spain) Roberto Dominguez Pérez	UD	10	15/03/2002	Fiuggi, Italy	EBU EU Cruiserweight Title. 100-89, 98-91, 98-91.
Loss	33-0	(Cuba) Juan Carlos Gómez	TKO	6	03/11/2001	Hansehalle, Lübeck, Germany	WBC World Cruiserweight Title.
Win	12-0	(Italy) Paolo Ferrara	UD	10	24/08/2001	Formia, Italy	Italy Cruiserweight Title. 98-93, 99-94, 99-94.
Win	16-10	(Colombia) Armando Grueso	PTS	6	12/07/2001	Torre Annunziata, Italy	
Win	8-0	(Ukraine) Oleksiy Trofymov	MD	10	23/02/2001	Giugliano, Italy	WBU Intercontinental Cruiserweight Title. 95-95, 96-93, 97-92.
Win	1-11-1	(Cameroon) Henry Kolle Njume	PTS	6	23/06/2000	Bergamo, Italy	
Loss	36-12-1	(United Kingdom) Johnny Nelson	TKO	7	08/04/2000	York Hall, London, United Kingdom	WBO World Cruiserweight Title. Referee stopped the bout at 2:23 of the seventh round.
Win	0-2	(Romania) Danut Moisa	TKO	2	23/12/1999	Torre Annunziata, Italy	
Win	0-1	(Romania) Daniel Lingurici	TKO	3	03/12/1999	Milan, Italy	
Win	16-2	(Italy) Mario Tonus	PTS	10	19/11/1999	San Dona di Piave, Italy	Italy Cruiserweight Title.
Win	--	(Romania) Daniel Lingurici	TKO	3	07/08/1999	Civitavecchia, Italy	
Win	16-1	(Italy) Mario Tonus	PTS	10	15/04/1999	Sala Consilina, Italy	Italy Cruiserweight Title.
Win	0-3	(Romania) Ioan Mihai	PTS	6	18/03/1999	Toscolano-Maderno, Italy	
Win	16-1-1	(Italy) Marco Guidelli	PTS	10	09/11/1998	Marina di Grosseto, Italy	Italy Cruiserweight Title.
Win	1-3	(Romania) Ion Ene	TKO	9	15/08/1998	Torre Annunziata, Italy	WBU Intercontinental Cruiserweight Title.
Win	--	(Romania) Nicolae Hoit	TKO	3	02/07/1998	Afragola, Italy	
Win	14-4-1	(Italy) Salvatore Inserra	PTS	6	29/05/1998	Pesaro, Italy	
Win	1-8	(Slovakia) Štefan Čekan	TKO	1	14/03/1998	Rodengo-Saiano, Italy	
Win	6-5	(Hungary) Zoltán Petrányi	DQ	6	13/02/1998	Torre Annunziata, Italy	
Win	0-2	(Slovakia) Tibor Jevčák	TKO	1	30/01/1998	Castrovillari, Italy	
Win	21-31-3	(Belgium) Yves Monsieur	PTS	6	06/12/1997	Catanzaro, Italy	
Win	0-3	(Cameroon) Henry Kolle Njume	PTS	6	03/11/1997	Castel Volturno, Italy	
Win	0-4	(Hungary) Richard Raffesberger	KO	1	25/09/1997	Castel Mella, Italy	
Win	1-4-1	(Hungary) István Beszédes	TKO	4	09/08/1997	San Gennaro Vesuviano, Italy	
