= France at the 1996 Summer Olympics =

- IOC code: FRA
- NOC: French National Olympic and Sports Committee
- Website: www.franceolympique.com (in French)

in Atlanta
- Competitors: 299 (197 men and 102 women) in 25 sports
- Flag bearer: Marie-José Pérec
- Medals Ranked 5th: Gold 15 Silver 7 Bronze 15 Total 37

Summer Olympics appearances (overview)
- 1896; 1900; ~~1904~~; 1908; 1912; 1920; 1924; 1928; 1932; 1936; 1948; 1952; 1956; 1960; 1964; 1968; 1972; 1976; 1980; 1984; 1988; 1992; 1996; 2000; 2004; 2008; 2012; 2016; 2020; 2024; 2028

Other related appearances
- 1906 Intercalated Games

France competed at the 1996 Summer Olympics in Atlanta, United States. 299 competitors, 197 men and 102 women, took part in 183 events in 25 sports.

== Medalists ==
Medal	Name	Sport	Event	Date
Gold	Jean Galfione	Athletics	Men's Pole vault	August 2
Gold	Marie-José Pérec	Athletics	Women's 200 m	August 1
Gold	Marie-José Pérec	Athletics	Women's 400 m	July 29
Gold	Frank Adisson; Wilfrid Forgues	Canoeing	Men's slalom C-2	July 28
Gold	Florian Rousseau	Cycling	Men's time trial	July 24
Gold	Christophe Capelle; Philippe Ermenault; Jean-Michel Monin; Francis Moreau	Cycling	Men's team pursuit	
Gold	Jeannie Longo	Cycling	Women's road race	July 21
Gold	Félicia Ballanger	Cycling	Women's sprint	July 27
Gold	Nathalie Lancien	Cycling	Women's points race	
Gold	Laura Flessel	Fencing	Women's Épée Individual	July 21
Gold	Valérie Barlois; Laura Flessel; Sophie Moressee-Pichot	Fencing	Women's team Épée	July 24
Gold	Djamel Bouras	Judo	Men's 78 kg	July 23
Gold	David Douillet	Judo	Men's +95 kg	July 20
Gold	Marie-Claire Restoux	Judo	Women's 52 kg	July 25
Gold	Jean-Pierre Amat	Shooting	Men's 50 m rifle three positions	
Silver	Philippe Ermenault	Cycling	Men's individual pursuit	
Silver	Marion Clignet	Cycling	Women's individual pursuit	
Silver	Jeannie Longo	Cycling	Women's road time trial	
Silver	Lionel Plumenail	Fencing	Men's Foil Individual	July 22
Silver	Valérie Barlois	Fencing	Women's Épée Individual	July 21
Silver	Gilles Bosquet; Daniel Fauché; Olivier Moncelet; Bertrand Vecten	Rowing	Men's coxless four	July 27
Silver	Ghani Yalouz	wrestling	Men's Greco-Roman 68 kg	July 21
Bronze	Patricia Girard	Athletics	Women's 100 m hurdles	July 31
Bronze	Patrice Estanguet	Canoeing	Men's slalom C-1	July 27
Bronze	Myriam Fox-Jerusalmi	Canoeing	Women's slalom K-1	July 27
Bronze	Miguel Martinez	Cycling	Men's Cross-country	July 30
Bronze	Alexandra Ledermann	Equestrian	Individual jumping	August 4
Bronze	Franck Boidin	Fencing	Men's Foil Individual	July 22
Bronze	Jean-Michel Henry; Robert Leroux; Éric Srecki	Fencing	Men's team Épée	July 23
Bronze	Damien Touya	Fencing	Men's Sabre Individual	July 21
Bronze	Christophe Gagliano	Judo	Men's -71kg	July 24
Bronze	Stéphane Traineau	Judo	Men's -95kg	July 21
Bronze	Christine Cicot	Judo	Women's +72kg	July 20
Bronze	Samuel Barathay; Frédéric Kowal	Rowing	Men's double sculls	July 27
Bronze	Michel Andrieux; Jean-Christophe Rolland	Rowing	Men's coxless pair	July 27
Bronze	Hélène Cortin; Christine Gossé	Rowing	Women's coxless pair	July 27
Bronze	Jean-Pierre Amat	Shooting	Men's 10 m air rifle	

== Archery ==
In France's sixth appearance in modern Olympic archery, defending gold medallist Sebastien Flute was defeated in the first round of elimination. Fellow veteran Severine Bonal was also defeated early, while Lionel Torres reached the quarterfinal. The men's team was defeated in the first round.

Athlete	Event	Ranking round		Round of 64	Round of 32	Round of 16	Quarterfinals	Semifinals	Final / BM	
Athlete	Event	Score	Seed	Opposition Score	Opposition Score	Opposition Score	Opposition Score	Opposition Score	Opposition Score	Rank
Sébastien Flute	Men's individual	644	46	Grov (NOR); L 158-161	Did not advance					39
Damien Letulle	Men's individual	657	26	Parenti (ITA); L 150-161	Did not advance					56
Lionel Torres	Men's individual	644	45	Fairweather (AUS); W 165-154	Yamamoto (JPN); W 164-163	Anchondo (MEX); W 159-158	Vermeiren (BEL); L 111-106	Did not advance		8
Sébastien Flute; Damien Letulle; Lionel Torres	Men's team	1945	10	—N/a		Finland; L 244-245	Did not advance			9
Severine Bonal	Women's individual	632	40	Damanhuri (INA); W 156-151	Kim (KOR); L 153-159	Did not advance				20

== Athletics ==
Key

- Note–Ranks given for track events are within the athlete's heat only
- Q = Qualified for the next round
- q = Qualified for the next round as a fastest loser or, in field events, by position without achieving the qualifying target
- NR = National record
- N/A = Round not applicable for the event
- Bye = Athlete not required to compete in round

=== Men's track & road ===
Athlete	Event	Heat		Quarterfinal		Semifinal		Final	
Athlete	Event	Result	Rank	Result	Rank	Result	Rank	Result	Rank
Needy Guims	100m	10.39	2 Q	10.43	7	Did not advance			
Pascal Theophile	100m	10.41	3 Q	10.38	7	Did not advance			
Jean-Louis Rapnouil	400m	45.93	2 Q	45.74	5	Did not advance			
Jimmy Jean-Joseph	800m	1:45.64	4 q	—N/a		1:48.50	6	Did not advance	
Bruno Konczylo	800m	1:46.04	3 q	—N/a		1:48.02	7	Did not advance	
Kader Chekhemani	1500m	3:37.81	3 Q	—N/a		3:34.84	8	Did not advance	
Mickaël Damian	1500m	3:39.21	8	—N/a		Did not advance			
Eric Dubus	1500m	3:47.01	9	—N/a		Did not advance			
Abdellah Béhar	10.000m	DNF		—N/a				Did not advance	
Mohamed Ezzher	10.000m	29:55.34	18	—N/a				Did not advance	
Vincent Clarico	110m hurdles	13.52	2 Q	13.57	4 Q	13.43	5	Did not advance	
Emmanuel Romary	110m hurdles	13.68	5 q	13.81	8	Did not advance			
Nadir Bosch	3000m steeplechase	8:31.65	7 q	—N/a		8:47.31	12	Did not advance	
Hermann Lomba; Régis Groisard; Pascal Theophile; Needy Guims	4 × 100 m relay	39.00	3 Q	—N/a		38.82	4 Q	DNF	
Jean-Olivier Brosseau	20 km walk	—N/a						1:26:29	35
Denis Langlois	20 km walk	—N/a						1:23:08	14
Thierry Toutain	20 km walk	—N/a						1:21:56	10
Martial Fesselier	50 km walk	—N/a						4:04:42	28
René Piller	50 km walk	—N/a						3:58:00	19
Thierry Toutain	50 km walk	—N/a						DSQ	

=== Men's field ===
Athlete	Event	Qualification		Final	
Athlete	Event	Distance	Position	Distance	Position
Emmanuel Bangué	Long jump	8.09	7 Q	8.19	4
Alain Andji	Pole vault	5.70	=1 Q	5.70	9
Jean Galfione	Pole vault	5.70	=5 Q	5.92 OR	1st place, gold medalist(s)
Gilles Dupray	Hammer throw	74.04	19	Did not advance	
Christophe Épalle	Hammer throw	74.22	17	Did not advance	
Raphaël Piolanti	Hammer throw	76.44	9 q	75.24	11

=== Women's track & road ===
Athlete	Event	Heat		Quarterfinal		Semifinal		Final	
Athlete	Event	Result	Rank	Result	Rank	Result	Rank	Result	Rank
Odiah Sidibé	100m	11.40	3 Q	11.38	4 Q	11.35	8	Did not advance	
Marie-José Pérec	200m	Bye		22.24	1 Q	22.07	1 Q	22.12	1st place, gold medalist(s)
Marie-José Pérec	400m	51.82	3 Q	51.00	1 Q	49.19	1 Q	48.25	1st place, gold medalist(s)
Viviane Dorsile	800m	2:00.02	3 q	—N/a		2:00.68	7	Did not advance	
Patricia Djaté-Taillard	800m	1:58.98	2 Q	—N/a		1:57.93	3 Q	1:59.61	6
Blandine Bitzner-Ducret	1500m	4:13.83	5 Q	—N/a		4:12.27	8	Did not advance	
Frédérique Quentin	1500m	4:15.95	9	—N/a		Did not advance			
Chantal Dallenbach	10.000m	33:22.35	15	—N/a				Did not advance	
Farida Fates	10.000m	34:38.49	15	—N/a				Did not advance	
Cécile Cinélu	100m hurdles	13.05	6 q	13.06	6	Did not advance			
Patricia Girard-Leno	100m hurdles	12.84	2 Q	12.72	3 Q	12.59	2 Q	12.65	3rd place, bronze medalist(s)
Monique Tourret	100m hurdles	13.12	4 Q	13.17	7	Did not advance			
Sandra Citte; Odiah Sidibe; Delphine Combe; Patricia Girard-Leno	4 × 100 m relay	43.09	2 Q	—N/a				42.76	6
Francine Landre; Viviane Dorsile; Evelyne Elien; Elsa de Vassoigne	4 × 400 m relay	3:28.07	3 Q	—N/a				3:28.46	8
Nadia Prasad	Marathon	—N/a						2:50:05	56
Nathalie Fortain	10km walk	—N/a						46:43	31
Valérie Nadaud	10km walk	—N/a						47:49	36

=== Women's field ===
Athlete	Event	Qualification		Final	
Athlete	Event	Distance	Position	Distance	Position
Isabelle Devaluez	Discus throw	55.08	37	Did not advance	
Nadine Auzeil	Javelin throw	52.76	31	Did not advance	

=== Combined events ===
Decathlon

Athlete	Event	100 m	LJ	SP	HJ	400 m	110H	DT	PV	JT	1500 m	Final	Rank
Sebastien Levicq	Result	11.17	7.16	14.05	1.92	50.55	14.50	45.00	5.40	64.42	4:29.50	8192	17
Sebastien Levicq	Points											8192	17
Christian Plaziat	Result	10.85	7.82	14.85	2.04	49.07	14.52	45.34	4.90	52.18	4:35.00	8282	11
Christian Plaziat	Points											8282	11

== Badminton ==
Athlete	Event	Round of 64	Round of 32	Round of 16	Quarterfinal	Semifinal	Final / BM	
Athlete	Event	Opposition Score	Opposition Score	Opposition Score	Opposition Score	Opposition Score	Opposition Score	Rank
Étienne Thobois	Men's singles	Sun (CHN); L 6–15, 6–15	Did not advance					
Sandra Dimbour	Women's singles	Bye	Kim (KOR); L 1–11, 3–11	Did not advance				

== Beach volleyball ==
Athlete	Event	First round	Second round	Third round	Fourth round	Elimination					Semifinal	Final / BM	
Athlete	Event	Opposition Result	Opposition Result	Opposition Result	Opposition Result	Opposition Result	Opposition Result	Opposition Result	Opposition Result	Opposition Result	Opposition Result	Opposition Result	Rank
Jean-Philippe Jodard; Christian Penigaud	Men's	Keel / Kreen (EST); W 15–8	Takao / Rego (BRA); L 1–15	Did not advance		Setoyama / Takao (JPN); W 15–8	Prosser / Zahner (AUS); L 13–15	Did not advance					=13
Brigitte Lesage; Anabelle Prawerman	Women's	Huerta / Soto (MEX); L 11–15	Did not advance			Kaize / Yudhani Rahayu (INA); L 11–15	Did not advance						=13

== Boxing ==
Athlete	Event	Round of 32	Round of 16	Quarterfinal	Semifinal	Final	
Athlete	Event	Opponent Result	Opponent Result	Opponent Result	Opponent Result	Opponent Result	Rank
Rachid Bouaita	Bantamweight	Abubakirov (KAZ); W 10–4	Križan (SVK); W 13–6	Mesa (CUB); L 8–15	Did not advance		
Nordine Mouichi	Light welterweight	Usman (PAK); W KO-1	Bykovsky (BLR); W 17-6	Urkal (GER); L 10-19	Did not advance		
Hussein Bayram	Welterweight	Simion (ROU); L 6-13	Did not advance				
Jean-Paul Mendy	Middleweight	Ottke (GER); L 4-11	Did not advance				
Jean-Louis Mandengue	Light heavyweight	Pourtaghi (IRN); W 21-9	Bispo (BRA); L RSCH-1	Did not advance			
Christophe Mendy	Heavyweight	—N/a	Bali (ROU); W RSCH-2	Defiagbon (CAN); L DSQ-3	Did not advance		
Josué Blocus	Heavyweight	Guevara (VEN); W RSCH-2	Mamedov (AZE); L RSCH-1	Did not advance			

== Canoeing ==
Men

Athlete	Event	Run 1		Run 2		Best	
Athlete	Event	Time	Rank	Time	Rank	Time	Rank
Emmanuel Brugvin	C-1	163.28		156.71		156.71	6
Hervé Delamarre	C-1	155.98		178.77		155.98	5
Patrice Estanguet	C-1	152.84		160.89		152.84	3rd place, bronze medalist(s)
Frank Adisson; Wilfrid Forgues	C-2	195.82		158.82		158.82	1st place, gold medalist(s)
Thierry Saïdi; Emmanuel del Rey	C-2	173.43		165.47		165.47	6

== Cycling ==
=== Road ===
Men

Athlete	Event	Time	Rank
Laurent Brochard	Road race	4:56:33	17
Francesco Casagrande	Road race	4:56:44	32
Laurent Jalabert	Road race	4:56:43	21
Didier Rous	Road race	4:56:50	83
Richard Virenque	Road race	4:55:10	5
Laurent Brochard	Time trial	1:09:22	20
Laurent Jalabert	Time trial	1:07:34	13

Women

Athlete	Event	Time	Rank
Marion Clignet	Road race	02:41:50	38
Jeannie Longo-Ciprelli	Road race	02:36:13	1st place, gold medalist(s)
Catherine Marsal	Road race	02:36:56	16
Marion Clignet	Time trial	38:14	5
Jeannie Longo-Ciprelli	Time trial	37:00	2nd place, silver medalist(s)

=== Track ===
Points race

Athlete	Event	Points	Rank
Francis Moreau	Men's points race	21	5
Nathalie Even-Lancien	Women's points race	24	1st place, gold medalist(s)

Sprint

Athlete	Event	Qualification		First round	Repechage 1	Second round	Repechage 2	Round of 16	Repechage 3	Quarterfinal	Semifinal	Final / BM	
Athlete	Event	Time Speed	Rank	Opposition Time	Opposition Time	Opposition Time	Opposition Time	Opposition Time	Opposition Time	Opposition Time	Opposition Time	Opposition Time	Rank
Frédéric Magné	Men's sprint	10.602; 67.91 km/h	14 Q	Moreno (ESP); W 10.740	Bye	Rousseau (FRA); L	Capitano (ITA); Escuredo (ESP); W 11.035	Neiwand (AUS); L	Buráň (CZE); Berzins (LAT); W 10.975	Harnett (CAN); L, W 11.022, L	Did not advance		
Florian Rousseau	Men's sprint	10.397; 69.25 km/h	8 Q	van Zyl (RSA); W 11.296	Bye	Magné (FRA); W 10.745	Bye	Pokorny (GER); W 10.828	Bye	Fiedler (GER); L, L	Did not advance		
Felicia Ballanger	Women's sprint	11.277; 63.84 km/h	2 Q	—N/a				Kasslin (FIN); W 11.901	Bye	Salumäe (EST); W 11.831, W 12.082	Neumann (GER); W 12.022, W 12.046	Ferris (AUS); W 11.903, W 12.096	1st place, gold medalist(s)

Pursuit

Athlete	Event	Qualifying		Quarterfinal	Semifinal	Final	
Athlete	Event	Time	Rank	Opposition Time	Opposition Time	Opposition Time	Rank
Philippe Ermenault	Men's individual pursuit	4:21.295	2 Q	Perez (ARG); W 4:22.826	Markov (RUS); W 4:24.082	Collinelli (ITA); L 4:22.714	2nd place, silver medalist(s)
Christophe Capelle; Philippe Ermenault; Jean-Michel Monin; Francis Moreau	Men's team pursuit	4:09.570	1 Q	New Zealand; W 4:08.965	Italy; W 4:08.460	Russia; W 4:07.730	1st place, gold medalist(s)
Marion Clignet	Women's individual pursuit	3:35.774	2 Q	Mažeikytė (LTU); W 3:36.446	Arndt (GER); W 3:35.412	Bellutti (ITA); L 3:38.571	2nd place, silver medalist(s)

Time trial

Athlete	Event	Time	Rank
Florian Rousseau	Men's 1km time trial	1:02.712 OR	1st place, gold medalist(s)

=== Mountain Bike ===
Athlete	Event	Time	Rank
Christophe Dupouey	Men's	2:25:03	4
Miguel Martinez	Men's	2:20:36	3rd place, bronze medalist(s)
Laurence Leboucher	Women's	1:59.00	11
Sandra Temporelli	Women's	2:06.57	24

== Diving ==
Athlete	Event	Preliminary		Semifinal				Final			
Athlete	Event	Points	Rank	Points	Rank	Total	Rank	Points	Rank	Total	Rank
Julie Danaux	Women's 10 m platform	201.27	29	Did not advance							

== Fencing ==
15 fencers, 9 men and 6 women, represented France in 1996.

Men

Athlete	Event	Round of 64	Round of 32	Round of 16	Quarterfinal	Semifinal	Final / BM	
Athlete	Event	Opposition Result	Opposition Result	Opposition Result	Opposition Result	Opposition Result	Opposition Result	Rank
Franck Boidin	Individual foil	Bye	Jeong (KOR); W 15–14	García (ESP); W 15–12	Omnès (FRA); W 15–11	Puccini (ITA); L 13–15	Wienand (GER); W 15–11	3rd place, bronze medalist(s)
Philippe Omnès	Individual foil	Bye	Grigoryev (KAZ); W 15–4	Gregory (CUB); W 15–14	Boidin (FRA); L 11–15	Did not advance		7
Lionel Plumenail	Individual foil	Bye	Ludwig (AUT); W 15–12	Pavlovich (RUS); W 15–12	Holubytskiy (UKR); W 15–13	Wienand (GER); W 15–9	Puccini (ITA); L 12–15	2nd place, silver medalist(s)
Jean-Michel Henry	Individual épée	Bye	Epurescu (ROU); W 15–9	Rivas (COL); W 15–11	Beketov (RUS); L 13–15	Did not advance		6
Robert Leroux	Individual épée	Bye	Bloom (USA); W 15–9	Kaaberma (EST); L 14–15	Did not advance			12
Éric Srecki	Individual épée	Bye	González (ESP); W 15–1	Beketov (RUS); L 10–15	Did not advance			9
Jean-Michel Henry; Robert Leroux; Éric Srecki	Team épée	—N/a		Bye	Spain; W 45–38	Russia; L 42–35	Germany; W 45–42	3rd place, bronze medalist(s)
Jean-Philippe Daurelle	Individual sabre	Bye	García (ESP); W 15–9	Touya (FRA); L 7–15	Did not advance			12
Franck Ducheix	Individual sabre	Bye	Olech (POL); W 15–11	Becker (GER); L 8–15	Did not advance			13
Damien Touya	Individual sabre	Bye	Kaliuzhniy (UKR); W 15–11	Daurelle (FRA); W 15–7	Sznajder (POL); W 15–12	Sharikov (RUS); L 14–15	Navarrete (HUN); W 15–7	3rd place, bronze medalist(s)
Damien Touya; Franck Ducheix; Jean-Philippe Daurelle	Team sabre	—N/a		Bye	Poland; L 42–45	Did not advance		5

Women

Athlete	Event	Round of 64	Round of 32	Round of 16	Quarterfinal	Semifinal	Final / BM	
Athlete	Event	Opposition Result	Opposition Result	Opposition Result	Opposition Result	Opposition Result	Opposition Result	Rank
Clothilde Magnan	Individual foil	Bye	Marsh (USA); L 9–15	Did not advance				23
Laurence Modaine-Cessac	Individual foil	Bye	Sharkova-Sidorova (RUS); W 15–14	Bianchedi (ITA); W 15–0	Koszto (GER); W 15–14	Vezzali (ITA); L 7–15	Trillini (ITA); L 9–15	4
Adeline Wuillème	Individual foil	Bye	Lazăr-Szabo (ROU); W 15–12	Badea-Cârlescu (ROU); L 6–15	Did not advance			14
Adeline Wuillème; Clothilde Magnan; Laurence Modaine-Cessac	Team foil	—N/a		Bye	Hungary; L 45–38	Did not advance		5
Valérie Barlois-Mevel-Leroux	Individual épée	Bye	Elinder (ROU); W 15–3	Hablützel-Bürki (SUI); W 15–14	Nagy (HUN); W 15–9	Zalaffi (ITA); W 15–6	Flessel-Colovic (FRA); L 12–15	2nd place, silver medalist(s)
Laura Flessel-Colovic	Individual épée	Bye	Chiesa (ITA); W 15–10	Titova (UKR); W 15–11	Hormay (HUN); W 15–12	Szalay-Horváth (HUN); W 15–10	Barlois-Mevel-Leroux (FRA); W 15–12	1st place, gold medalist(s)
Sophie Moressée-Pichot	Individual épée	Bye	Yan Jing (CHN); W 15–14	Ittner (GER); L 10–15	Did not advance			10
Laura Flessel-Colovic; Sophie Moressée-Pichot; Valérie Barlois-Mevel-Leroux	Team épée	—N/a		Bye	Cuba; W 45–35	Russia; W 45–39	Italy; W 45–33	1st place, gold medalist(s)

== Football ==
=== Men's tournament ===
Team roster

Head coach: Raymond Domenech

No.	Pos.	Player	Date of birth (age)	Caps	Club
1	GK	Lionel Letizi	28 May 1973 (aged 23)		(France) Nice
2	DF	Martin Djetou	15 December 1974 (aged 21)		(France) Strasbourg
3	DF	Jérôme Bonnissel	4 January 1973 (aged 23)		(France) Montpellier
4	DF	Florent Laville	7 August 1973 (aged 22)		(France) Lyon
5	DF	Patrick Moreau	3 November 1973 (aged 22)		(France) Bastia
7	MF	Claude Makélélé	18 February 1973 (aged 23)		(France) Nantes
8	MF	Vikash Dhorasoo	10 October 1973 (aged 22)		(France) Le Havre
9	FW	Florian Maurice	20 May 1974 (aged 22)		(France) Lyon
10	MF	Antoine Sibierski	5 August 1974 (aged 21)		(France) Lille
11	MF	Robert Pires	29 October 1973 (aged 22)		(France) Metz
12	DF	Geoffray Toyes	18 May 1973 (aged 23)		(France) Bordeaux
13	DF	Vincent Candela	24 October 1973 (aged 22)		(France) Guingamp
14	MF	Olivier Dacourt	25 September 1974 (aged 21)		(France) Strasbourg
15	FW	Tony Vairelles	10 April 1973 (aged 23)		(France) Lens
16	GK	Vincent Fernández	31 January 1975 (aged 21)		(France) Châteauroux
17	FW	Sylvain Wiltord	10 May 1974 (aged 22)		(France) Rennes
18	MF	Sylvain Legwinski	10 June 1973 (aged 23)		(France) AS Monaco
20	DF	Oumar Dieng°	30 December 1972 (aged 23)		(France) Paris Saint-Germain

Groupstage

Team	Pld	W	D	L	GF	GA	GD	Pts
France	3	2	1	0	5	2	+3	7
Spain	3	2	1	0	5	3	+2	7
Australia	3	1	0	2	4	6	−2	3
Saudi Arabia	3	0	0	3	2	5	−3	0

Source: FIFA
20 July 1996
18:30 UTC−4
Match 1

France	2–0	Australia
Pires 13'; Maurice 75'	Report

Orange Bowl, Miami
Attendance: 14,322
Referee: Roberto Rubén Ruscio (Argentina)
22 July 1996
19:00 UTC−4
Match 2

France	1–1	Spain
Legwinski 39'	Report	Óscar 85'

Citrus Bowl, Orlando, Florida
Attendance: 16,773
Referee: Pirom Un-prasert (Thailand)
24 July 1996
19:00 UTC−4
Match 3

France	2–1	Saudi Arabia
Maurice 20' (pen.); Sibierski 48'	Report	Amin 26'

Orange Bowl, Miami
Attendance: 4,615
Referee: Benito Archundia (Mexico)

Quarterfinal

27 July 1996
18:00 UTC−4
Quarterfinals

Portugal	2–1 (a.e.t.)	France
Capucho 7'; Calado 105' (pen.)	Report	Maurice 49' (pen.)

Orange Bowl, Miami
Attendance: 22,339
Referee: Pierluigi Collina (Italy)

== Gymnastics ==
=== Artistic ===
Men

Team

Athlete	Event	Apparatus												Total	
Athlete	Event	F		PH		R		V		PB		HB		Total	
Athlete	Event	C	O	C	O	C	O	C	O	C	O	C	O	Score	Rank
Patrice Casimir	Team	9.275	9.300	9.625	9.800 Q	9.350	9.550	9.562	9.375	9.575	9.050	9.537	9.425	113.424	23 Q
Sebastien Tayac	Team	9.500	9.587	9.275	9.562	9.325	9.350	9.425	9.375	9.175	9.400	9.400	9.712	113.086	27 Q
Frederick Nicolas	Team	9.075	9.325	9.150	9.350	9.200	9.375	9.400	9.175	9.175	9.375	9.400	9.500	111.500	39 Q
Frederic Lemoine	Team	9.475	9.175	9.300	9.125	9.250	9.537	0.000	9.200	8.500	0.000	9.400	9.325	92.287	85
Eric Poujade	Team	0.000	9.350	9.700	9.737 Q	—N/a		9.587	9.250	9.400	9.400	9.512	8.900	84.836	93
Sebastien Darrigade	Team	9.300	0.000	8.800	9.500	9.275	9.300	9.450	0.000	9.500	9.525	9.512	0.000	84.162	94
Thierry Aymes	Team	9.587	9.787 Q	—N/a		9.150	9.125	9.400	9.175	0.000	9.537	0.000	9.650	75.361	102
Total	Team	94.436		94.999		93.512		93.799		94.062		94.973		565.781	11

Individual finals

Athlete	Event	Apparatus						Total	
Athlete	Event	F	PH	R	V	PB	HB	Score	Rank
Sébastien Tayac	All-around	9.562	9.512	9.425	9.525	9.200	9.475	56.699	26
Frédérick Nicolas	All-around	9.350	8.750	9.500	9.225	9.500	9.537	55.862	33
Thierry Aymes	Floor	9.750	—N/a					9.750	=4
Patrice Casimir	Pommel horse	—N/a	9.762	—N/a				9.762	4
Eric Poujade	Pommel horse	—N/a	9.350	—N/a				9.350	7

Women

Team

Athlete	Event	Apparatus								Total	
Athlete	Event	V		UB		BB		F		Total	
Athlete	Event	C	O	C	O	C	O	C	O	Score	Rank
Isabelle Severino	Team	9.425	9.487	9.687	9.700	9.037	9.500	9.650	9.687	76.173	26 Q
Elvire Teza	Team	9.362	9.400	9.737	9.712	8.750	9.662	9.587	9.587	75.797	33 Q
Ludivine Furnon	Team	9.537	9.600	9.587	9.525	8.750	9.025	9.750	9.650	75.474	35 Q
Emilie Volle	Team	9.287	9.387	9.612	9.500	9.050	9.550	9.412	9.537	75.335	36
Cécile Canqueteau	Team	9.150	9.425	9.187	9.475	8.700	9.337	9.487	9.700	74.461	45
Orélie Troscompt	Team	9.125	9.350	—N/a				9.275	9.312	37.062	99
Laure Gély	Team	—N/a		9.537	9.275	8.550	9.200	—N/a		36.562	100
Total	Team	94.060		96.072		91.536		96.047		377.715	8

Individual finals

Athlete	Event	Apparatus				Total	
Athlete	Event	V	UB	BB	F	Score	Rank
Isabelle Severino	All-around	9.562	9.675	9.587	9.700	38.524	13
Elvire Teza	All-around	9.493	9.687	9.687	9.587	38.454	16
Ludivine Furnon	All-around	9.606	9.425	9.462	9.750	38.243	19

=== Rhythmic ===
Individual

Athlete	Event	Preliminaries						Semifinal						Final					
Athlete	Event	Apparatus				Total		Apparatus				Total		Apparatus				Total	
Athlete	Event	Rope	Ball	Clubs	Ribbon	Score	Rank	Rope	Ball	Clubs	Ribbon	Score	Rank	Rope	Ball	Clubs	Ribbon	Score	Rank
Eva Serrano	All-around	9.516	9.600	9.466	9.566	38.148	7 Q	9.666	9.700	9.566	9.683	38.615	8 Q	9.683	9.700	9.700	9.733	38.666	7

Group

Athlete	Event	Preliminaries				Final			
Athlete	Event	Apparatus		Total		Apparatus		Total	
Athlete	Event	5 balls	3 Balls 2 Ropes	Score	Rank	5 balls	3 Balls 2 Ropes	Score	Rank
Charlotte Camboulives; Caroline Chimot; Sylvie Didone; Audrey Grosclaude; Frederique Lehon; Nadia Mimoun	All-around	19.200	19.033	38.233	5 Q	19.149	19.050	38.199	4

== Handball ==
=== Men's tournament ===
Roster

- Eric Amalou
- Grégory Anquetil
- Stéphane Cordinier
- Yohan Delattre
- Christian Gaudin
- Stéphane Joulin
- Guéric Kervadec
- Denis Lathoud
- Pascal Mahé
- Bruno Martini
- Gaël Monthurel
- Raoul Prandi
- Jackson Richardson
- Philippe Schaaf
- Stéphane Stoecklin
- Frédéric Volle

Preliminary round

Pos	Team	Pld	W	D	L	GF	GA	GD	Pts	Qualification
1	France	5	4	0	1	145	114	+31	8 (Note: France 27–25 Spain)	Semifinals
2	Spain	5	4	0	1	114	97	+17	8	Semifinals
3	Egypt	5	3	0	2	113	103	+10	6 (Note: Germany 22–24 Egypt)	Fifth place game
4	Germany	5	3	0	2	121	112	+9	6	Seventh place game
5	Algeria	5	0	1	4	95	117	−22	1 (Note: Algeria 20–20 Brazil)	Ninth place game
6	Brazil	5	0	1	4	100	145	−45	1	Eleventh place game

Rules for classification: 1) points; 2) head-to-head points; 3) head-to-head goal difference; 4) head-to-head number of goals scored; 5) goal difference.
Notes:

24 July 1996; 11:45	France	27–25	Spain	Georgia World Congress Center; Referees: Vujnović, Mladinić (CRO)
24 July 1996; 11:45	Kervadec 6	(10–9)	Urdiales 8	Georgia World Congress Center; Referees: Vujnović, Mladinić (CRO)

25 July 1996; 11:45	Algeria	22–33	France	Georgia World Congress Center; Referees: Øie, Høgsnes (NOR)
25 July 1996; 11:45	Lamali 5	(10–13)	Stoecklin 9	Georgia World Congress Center; Referees: Øie, Høgsnes (NOR)

27 July 1996; 20:45	France	37–23	Brazil	Georgia World Congress Center; Referees: Moelle Mabounda, Mvoula (CGO)
27 July 1996; 20:45	Volle 14	(16–10)	Pelissari 7	Georgia World Congress Center; Referees: Moelle Mabounda, Mvoula (CGO)

29 July 1996; 10:00	Egypt	20–25	France	Georgia World Congress Center; Referees: Øie, Høgsnes (NOR)
29 July 1996; 10:00	Soliman 5	(9–12)	Lathoud 8	Georgia World Congress Center; Referees: Øie, Høgsnes (NOR)

31 July 1996; 16:15	France	23–24	Germany	Georgia World Congress Center; Referees: Brussel, van Dongen (NED)
31 July 1996; 16:15	Prandi, Stoecklin 6	(10–12)	Fegter 7	Georgia World Congress Center; Referees: Brussel, van Dongen (NED)

Semifinal

2 August 1996; 20:45	France	20–24	Croatia	Georgia World Congress Center; Referees: Høgsnes, Øie (NOR)
2 August 1996; 20:45	Stoecklin 8	(8–12)	Ćavar 8	Georgia World Congress Center; Referees: Høgsnes, Øie (NOR)

Bronze medal game

4 August 1996; 11:00	Spain	27–25	France	Georgia World Congress Center; Referees: Elbrønd, Løvqvist (DEN)
4 August 1996; 11:00	three players 5	(13–12)	Cordinier 7	Georgia World Congress Center; Referees: Elbrønd, Løvqvist (DEN)

== Judo ==
Men

Athlete	Event	Round of 64	Round of 32	Round of 16	Quarterfinal	Semifinal	Repechage 1	Repechage 2	Repechage 3	Final / BM	
Athlete	Event	Opposition Result	Opposition Result	Opposition Result	Opposition Result	Opposition Result	Opposition Result	Opposition Result	Opposition Result	Opposition Result	Rank
Franck Chambilly	–60 kg	Bye	Matuszek (SVK); W	Giovinazzo (ITA); L	Did not advance		Vazagashvili (GEO); L	Did not advance			
Larbi Benboudaoud	–65 kg	Bye	Guimarães (BRA); L	Did not advance							
Christophe Gagliano	–71 kg	Bye	Pereira (BRA); L	Did not advance			Abanoz (TUR); W	Corkin (NZL); W	Shturbabin (UZB); W	Boldbaatar (MGL); W	3rd place, bronze medalist(s)
Djamel Bouras	–78 kg	Bye	Savchishkin (RUS); W	Yuan (CHN); W	García (ARG); W	Dott (GER); W	Bye			Koga (JPN); W	1st place, gold medalist(s)
Darcel Yandzi	–86 kg	Bye	Birch (GBR); W	Wilkinson (AUS); W	Nakamura (ROU); L	Did not advance	Bye	Yoshida (JPN); L	Did not advance		
Stéphane Traineau	–95 kg	Bye	Svirid (BLR); W	Gowing (NZL); W	Nakamura (JPN); W	Kim (KOR); L	Bye			Kovács (HUN); W	3rd place, bronze medalist(s)
David Douillet	+95 kg	Bye	Van Barneveld (BEL); W	Mueller (LUX); W	Krieger (AUT); W	Ogawa (JPN); W	Bye			Pérez (ESP); W	1st place, gold medalist(s)

Women

Athlete	Event	Round of 32	Round of 16	Quarterfinal	Semifinal	Repechage 1	Repechage 2	Repechage 3	Final / BM	
Athlete	Event	Opposition Result	Opposition Result	Opposition Result	Opposition Result	Opposition Result	Opposition Result	Opposition Result	Opposition Result	Rank
Sarah Nichilo-Rosso	–48 kg	Li (CHN); W	Cao (VIE); W	Kye (PRK); L	Did not advance	Bye	Meijer (NED); W	Roszkowska (POL); W	Savón (CUB); L	=5
Marie-Claire Restoux	–52 kg	Bye	Brain-Grainger (AUS); W	Pedulla (USA); W	Krause (POL); W	Bye			Hyun (KOR); W	1st place, gold medalist(s)
Magali Baton	–56 kg	González (CUB); L	Did not advance			Gal (NED); W	Fairbrother (GBR); L	Did not advance		
Cathérine Fleury-Vachon	–61 kg	Bye	Emoto (JPN); L	Did not advance		Bogomyakova (RUS); L	Did not advance			
Alice Dubois	–61 kg	Bye	Revé (CUB); W	Spacek (AUT); W	Szczepańska (POL); L	Bye			Wang (CHN); L	=5
Estha Essombe	–72 kg	Jenkins (CAN); W	Luna (CAN); W	Gómez (VEN); W	Tanabe (JPN); L	Bye			Scapin (ITA); L	=5
Christine Cicot	+72 kg	Bye	Maksymow (POL); L	Did not advance		—N/a	Hefny (EGY); W	Son (KOR); W	Gundarenko (RUS); W	3rd place, bronze medalist(s)

== Modern pentathlon ==
Athlete	Event	Riding (show jumping)			Fencing (épée one touch)			Shooting (10 m air pistol)			Swimming (200 m freestyle)			Running (3000 m cross-country)			Total	
Athlete	Event	Time	Rank	MP Points	Wins	Rank	MP Points	Points	Rank	MP Points	Time	Rank	MP Points	Time	Rank	MP Points	Points	Rank
Sebastien Deleigne	Individual	1:24.73	23	926	13	24	730	178	=11	1072	3:29.52	26	1196	13:26.607	21	1147	5071	26
Christophe Ruer	Individual	1:21.85	16	965	15	=18	790	177	=14	1060	3:16.26	4	1304	12:54.137	10	1244	5363	12

== Rowing ==
Men

Athlete	Event	Heat		Repechage		Semifinal		Final	
Athlete	Event	Time	Rank	Time	Rank	Time	Rank	Time	Rank
Michel Andrieux; Jean-Christophe Rolland	Coxless pair	6:35.75	1 Q	bye		6:49.15	2 FA	6:22.15	3rd place, bronze medalist(s)
Frédéric Kowal; Samuel Barathay	Double sculls	6:44.01	1 Q	bye		6:32.86	1 FA	6:19.85	3rd place, bronze medalist(s)
Bertrand Vecten; Olivier Moncelet; Daniel Fauché; Gilles Bosquet	Coxless four	6:18.70	3 Q	bye		6:09.58	1 FA	6:07.03	2nd place, silver medalist(s)
Yves Lamarque; Vincent Lepvraud; Sébastien Vieilledent; Fabrice Leclerc	Quadruple sculls	6:12.69	4 R	5:51.82	3 Q	6:03.74	5 FB	6:00.48	12
Stéphane Barré; Xavier Dorfman; Stéphane Guerinot; Henri-Pierre Dall'acqua	Lwt coxless four	6:26.84	6 R	5:59.95	3 Q	6:15.75	4 FB	6:02.39	7

Women

Athlete	Event	Heat		Repechage		Semifinal		Final	
Athlete	Event	Time	Rank	Time	Rank	Time	Rank	Time	Rank
Céline Garcia	Single sculls	8:10.22	4 R	8:32.58	2 Q	8:13.37	5 FB	7:33.30	10
Christine Gossé; Hélène Cortin	Coxless pair	7:31.91	1 Q	bye		7:30.21	1 FA	7:03.82	3rd place, bronze medalist(s)
Myriam Lamolle; Catherine Muller	Lwt double sculls	7:36.75	5 R	7:03.27	3 Q	7:20.11	5 FB	7:09.95	10

Qualification legend: FA=Final A (medal); FB=Final B (non-medal); FC=Final C (non-medal); FD=Final D (non-medal); SA/B=Semifinal A/B; SC/D=Semifinal C/D; R=Repechage

== Sailing ==
Men

Athlete	Event	Race											Total	
Athlete	Event	1	2	3	4	5	6	7	8	9	10	11	Points	Rank
Jean-Max de Chavigny	Mistral	7	5	~~10~~	1	~~14~~	5	2	7	19	—N/a		37	5
Philippe Presti	Finn	6	13	~~19~~	3	13	15	6	~~19~~	18	13	—N/a	87	15
Jean-François Berthet; Gwenaël Berthet	470	16	6	9	~~28~~	15	~~23~~	3	2	17	3	1	72	6

Women

Athlete	Event	Race											Total	
Athlete	Event	1	2	3	4	5	6	7	8	9	10	11	Points	Rank
Maud Herbert	Mistral	8	1	~~17~~	8	1	9	~~11~~	10	9	—N/a		46	8
Florence Le Brun; Annabel Chaulvin	470	13	13	~~PMS~~	12	7	5	~~19~~	14	13	11	10	98	15

Open

Fleet racing

Athlete	Event	Race											Total	
Athlete	Event	1	2	3	4	5	6	7	8	9	10	11	Points	Rank
Guillaume Florent	Laser	7	17	14	12	~~25~~	21	21	8	14	22	~~DSQ~~	136	15
Frédéric le Peutrec; Franck Citeau	Tornado	8	1	3	7	8	4	5	~~11~~	4	6	~~9~~	46	6

Mixed racing

Athlete	Event	Fleet racing												Match racing			
Athlete	Event	Race										Total		Quarterfinal	Semifinal	Final / BM	
Athlete	Event	1	2	3	4	5	6	7	8	9	10	Points	Rank	Opposition Result	Opposition Result	Opposition Result	Rank
Marc Bouet; Sylvain Chtounder; Gildas Morvan	Soling	11	~~DSQ~~	6	~~17~~	9	13	10	7	3	10	69	11	Did not advance			11

== Shooting ==
Men

Athlete	Event	Qualification		Final		Total	
Athlete	Event	Points	Rank	Points	Rank	Points	Rank
Jean-Pierre Amat	10 m air rifle	591	6 Q	102.1	1	693.1	3rd place, bronze medalist(s)
Franck Badiou	10 m air rifle	588	=18	Did not advance			
Michel Bury	50 m rifle prone	592	=30	Did not advance			
Roger Chassat	50 m rifle prone	590	=39	Did not advance			
Jean-Pierre Amat	50 m rifle three positions	1175 OR	=1 Q	98.9	3	1273.9 OR	1st place, gold medalist(s)
Roger Chassat	50 m rifle three positions	1156	=35	Did not advance			
Franck Dumoulin	10 m air pistol	573	=36	Did not advance			
Gérard Fernandez	10 m air pistol	579	=12	Did not advance			
Franck Dumoulin	25 m rapid fire pistol	575	=21	Did not advance			
Franck Dumoulin	50 m air pistol	560	=11	Did not advance			
Gérard Fernandez	50 m air pistol	553	=28	Did not advance			
Christophe Vicard	Trap	117	=37	Did not advance			
Jean-Paul Gros	Double trap	135	12	Did not advance			
Marc Mennessier	Double trap	131	=17	Did not advance			
Franck Durbesson	Skeet	121	=9	Did not advance			

Women

Athlete	Event	Qualification		Final		Total	
Athlete	Event	Points	Rank	Points	Rank	Points	Rank
Valérie Bellenoue	10 m air rifle	395	3	101.6	4	496.6	4
Carole Couesnon	10 m air rifle	384	=41	Did not advance			
Muriel Bernard	Double trap	98	14	Did not advance			

== Swimming ==
Men

Athlete	Event	Heat		Final	
Athlete	Event	Time	Rank	Time	Rank
Christophe Kalfayan	50 m freestyle	22.83	14 FB	22.96	=14
Nicolas Gruson	100 m freestyle	50.71	23	Did not advance	
Christophe Bordeau	200 m freestyle	1:52.17	24	Did not advance	
Yann deFabrique	400 m freestyle	3:55.42	14 FB	3:56.46	15
Yann deFabrique	1500 m freestyle	15:40.49	17	Did not advance	
Franck Schott	100 m backstroke	55.77	7 FA	55.76	8
Vladimir Latocha	100 m breaststroke	1:02.80	17 FB	1:02.28	9
Jean-Christophe Sarnin	200 m breaststroke	2:15.27	9 FB	2:16.26	14
Stéphan Perrot	200 m breaststroke	2:18.58	22	Did not advance	
Franck Esposito	100 m butterfly	53.77	12 FB	54.02	14
Franck Esposito	200 m butterfly	1:58.79	7 FA	1:58.10 NR	4
David Abrard	200 m butterfly	2:03.17	16 FB	2:01.25	15
Xavier Marchand	200 m individual medley	2:03.17	8 FA	2:04.29	8
Ludovic Depickère; Nicolas Gruson; Peirrick Chavatte; Frédéric Lefevre	4 × 100 m freestyle relay	3:21.79	11	Did not advance	
Yann deFabrique; Lionel Poirot; Bruno Orsoni; Christophe Bordeau	4 × 200 m freestyle relay	7:22.98	6 FA	7:24.85	8
Franck Schott; Vladimir Latocha; Franck Esposito; Nicolas Gruson	4 × 100 m medley relay	3:42.94	11	Did not advance	

Key:FA – Qualify to A final (medal); FB – Qualify to B final (non-medal)

Women

Athlete	Event	Heat		Final	
Athlete	Event	Time	Rank	Time	Rank
Casey Legler	50 m freestyle	26.52	=29	Did not advance	
Solenne Figuès	100 m freestyle	56.90	20	Did not advance	
Solenne Figuès	200 m freestyle	2:02.74	14 FB	2:01.47	12
Laetitia Choux	400 m freestyle	4:21.39	24	Did not advance	
Hélène Ricardo	100 m backstroke	1:04.03	19	Did not advance	
Hélène Ricardo	200 m backstroke	2:14.18	=10 FB	2:16.29	15
Karine Brémond	100 m breaststroke	1:11.80	25	Did not advance	
Karine Brémond	200 m breaststroke	2:36.26	29	Did not advance	
Karine Brémond	100 m butterfly	1:01.58	16 FB	1:01.20	11
Karine Brémond	200 m butterfly	2:13.58	11 FB	2:12.99	10
Solenne Figuès; Jacqueline Delord; Casey Legler; Marianne Le Verge	4 × 100 m freestyle relay	3:48.30	10	Did not advance	
Marianne Le Verge; Hélène Ricardo; Laëtitia Choux; Solenne Figuès	4 × 200 m freestyle relay	8:18.90	14	Did not advance	
Hélène Ricardo; Karine Brémond; Cécile Jeanson; Solenne Figuès	4 × 100 m medley relay	4:15.69	16	Did not advance	

Key:FA – Qualify to A final (medal); FB – Qualify to B final (non-medal)

== Synchronized swimming ==
Athlete	Event	Technical		Free		Total	
Athlete	Event	Score	Rank	Score	Rank	Score	Rank
Virginie Dedieu; Marianne Aeschbacher; Myriam Lignot; Celine Leveque; Julie Fabre; Isabelle Manable; Magali Rathier; Charlotte Massardier; Delphine Maréchal; Éva Riffet	Team	33.460	5	62.616	5	96.076	5

== Table tennis ==
Athlete	Event	Group stage				Round of 16	Quarterfinal	Semifinal	Final / BM	
Athlete	Event	Opposition Result	Opposition Result	Opposition Result	Rank	Opposition Result	Opposition Result	Opposition Result	Opposition Result	Rank
Patrick Chila	Men's singles	Kreanga (GRE); W 2–1	Toriola (NGR); W 2–0	Baboor (IND); W 2–1	1 Q	Roßkopf (GER); L 0–3	Did not advance			
Jean-Philippe Gatien	Men's singles	Korbel (CZE); L 0–2	Choi (PRK); W 2–0	Morales (CHI); W 2–0	2	Did not advance				
Patrick Chila; Christophe Legout	Men's doubles	Kong / Liu (CHN); L 0–2	Karlsson / von Scheele (SWE); W 2–1	Addy / Opoku (GHA); W 2–0	2	—N/a	Did not advance			
Damien Eloi; Jean-Philippe Gatien	Men's doubles	Chan / Lo (HKG); W 2–0	Choe / Li (PRK); W 2–0	Hyatt / Hylton (JAM); W 2–0	1 Q	—N/a	Fetzner / Roßkopf (GER); L 0–3	Did not advance		
Xiaoming Wang-Dréchou	Women's singles	Qiao (CHN); L 0–2	Sato (JPN); L 0–2	Musoke (UGA); W 2–0	3	Did not advance				
Emmanuelle Coubat; Xiaoming Wang-Dréchou	Women's doubles	Deng / Qiao (CHN); L 0–2	Chiu / Geng (CAN); W 2–1	—N/a	2	—N/a	Did not advance			

== Tennis ==
Men

Athlete	Event	Round of 64	Round of 32	Round of 16	Quarterfinal	Semifinal	Final / BM	
Athlete	Event	Opposition Result	Opposition Result	Opposition Result	Opposition Result	Opposition Result	Opposition Result	Rank
Arnaud Boetsch	Singles	Steven (NZL); W 6–2, 7–6^{(7–2)}	Bruguera (ESP); L 6–7^{(7–9)}, 6–4, 2-6	Did not advance				
Guillaume Raoux	Singles	Black (ZIM); L 3–6, 6–3, 2-6	Did not advance					
Arnaud Boetsch; Guillaume Raoux	Doubles	Woodbridge / Woodforde (AUS); L 2–6, 6–3, 3-6	—N/a	Did not advance				

Women

Athlete	Event	Round of 64	Round of 32	Round of 16	Quarterfinal	Semifinal	Final / BM	
Athlete	Event	Opposition Result	Opposition Result	Opposition Result	Opposition Result	Opposition Result	Opposition Result	Rank
Mary Pierce	Singles	Barabanschikova (RUS); W 6–3, 7–5	Gorrochategui (ARG); L 4–6, 6–1, 5–7	Did not advance				
Nathalie Tauziat	Singles	Sabatini (ARG); L 5–7, 2–6	Did not advance					
Mary Pierce; Nathalie Tauziat	Doubles	—N/a	Grzybowska / Olsza (POL); W 6–2, 3–6, 6-0	G Fernández / MJ Fernández (USA); L 4–6, 3–6	Did not advance			

== Weightlifting ==
Men

Athlete	Event	Snatch			Clean & Jerk			Total	Rank
Athlete	Event	1	2	3	1	2	3	Total	Rank
Eric Bonnel	– 54 kg	105.0	110.0	115.0	135.0	~~140.0~~	~~140.0~~	250.0	11
Cédric Plançon	– 91 kg	155.0	~~160.0~~	~~160.0~~	185.0	~~190.0~~	190.0	345.0	19

== Wrestling ==
Freestyle

Athlete	Event	Round 1	Round 2	Round 3	Semifinal	Repechage 1	Repechage 2	Repechage 3	Repechage 4	Bronze semifinal	Final / BM / Pl.	
Athlete	Event	Opposition Score	Opposition Score	Opposition Score	Opposition Score	Opposition Score	Opposition Score	Opposition Score	Opposition Score	Opposition Score	Opposition Score	Rank
David Legrand	–52 kg	Fitzgerald (AUS); W 10–0	Mohammadi (IRI); L 0–5	Did not advance		Sasayama (JPN); L 5–12	Did not advance					

Greco-Roman

Athlete	Event	Round 1	Round 2	Round 3	Semifinal	Repechage 1	Repechage 2	Repechage 3	Repechage 4	Bronze semifinal	Final / BM / Pl.	
Athlete	Event	Opposition Score	Opposition Score	Opposition Score	Opposition Score	Opposition Score	Opposition Score	Opposition Score	Opposition Score	Opposition Score	Opposition Score	Rank
Ghani Yalouz	–69 kg	Tretyakov (RUS); W 8–0	Miyake (JPN); W 10–0	Bye	Madzhidov (BLR); W 4–1	Bye					Wolny (POL); L 0–7	2nd place, silver medalist(s)

== Notes ==
- Watkins, Ginger T., ed. (1997). The Official Report of the Centennial Olympic Games, Volume III The Competition Results (PDF). Atlanta: Peachtree Publishers. ISBN 1-56145-150-9. Archived from the original (PDF) on 2007-09-27.
