= Fencing at the 1996 Summer Olympics – Men's épée =

Fencing at the Olympics

Men's épée at the Games of the XXVI Olympiad
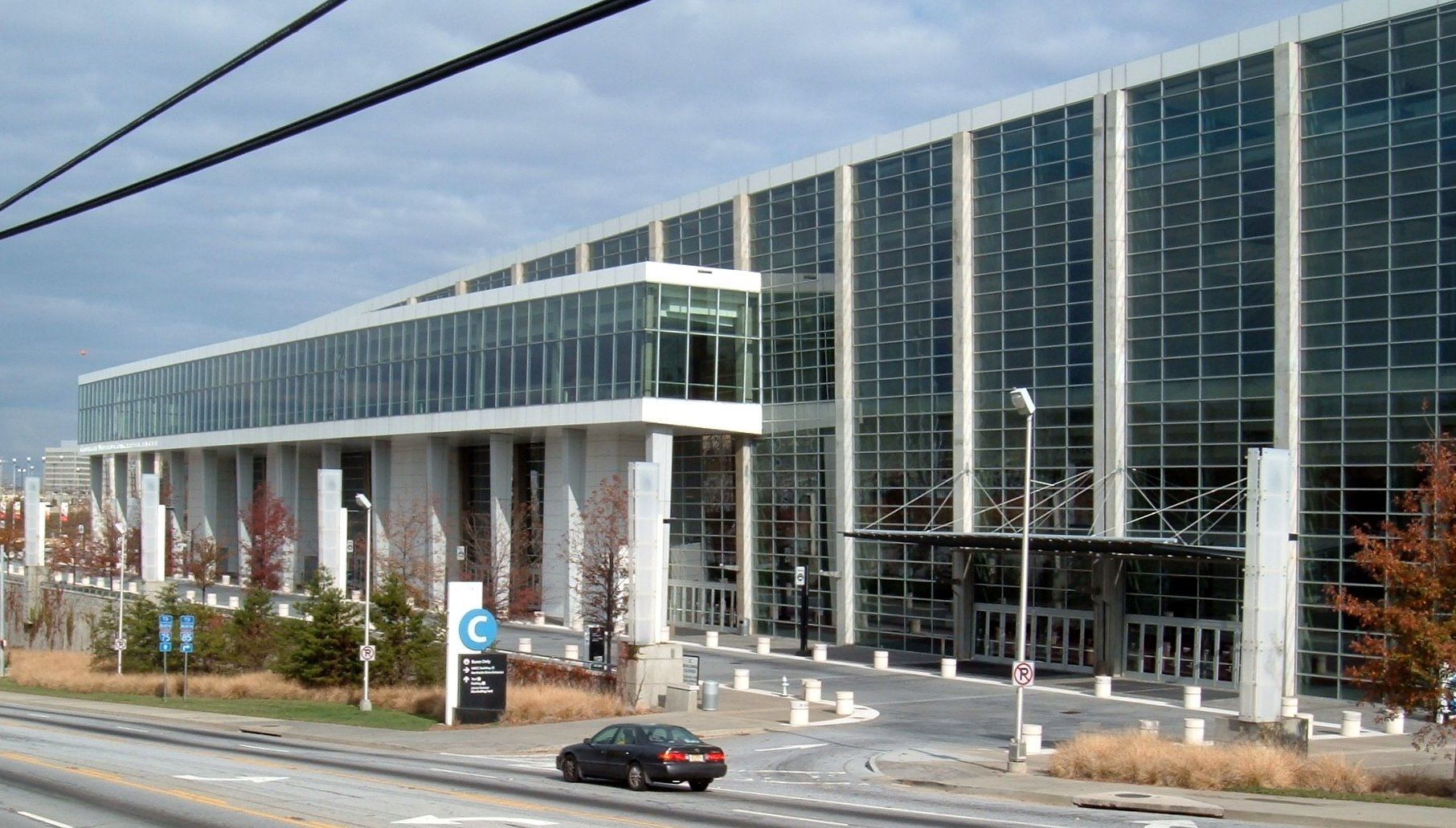
- Georgia World Congress Center (2007)
- Venue: Georgia World Congress Center
- Dates: 20 July 1996
- Competitors: 45 from 21 nations

Medalists
1st place, gold medalist(s)		Aleksandr Beketov	Russia
2nd place, silver medalist(s)		Iván Trevejo	Cuba
3rd place, bronze medalist(s)		Géza Imre	Hungary

The men's épée was one of ten fencing events on the fencing at the 1996 Summer Olympics programme. It was the twenty-second appearance of the event. The competition was held on 20 July 1996. 45 fencers from 21 nations competed, a sharply reduced number from prior Games which generally had 60 to 80 fencers. Each nation remained limited to 3 fencers in the event. The event was won by Aleksandr Beketov of Russia, the nation's first victory and first medal in the event in its debut (though it was the third straight Games with a Russian on the podium, with Andrey Shuvalov taking bronze for the Soviet Union in 1988 and Pavel Kolobkov earning silver representing the Unified Team in 1992). Iván Trevejo's silver was Cuba's first medal in the event since Ramón Fonst won the first two gold medals in 1900 and 1904. The bronze went to Géza Imre of Hungary, that nation's first medal in the men's individual épée since 1980. France's four-Games podium streak ended.

== Background ==
This was the 22nd appearance of the event, which was not held at the first Games in 1896 (with only foil and sabre events held) but has been held at every Summer Olympics since 1900.

All eight quarterfinalists from 1992 returned: gold medalist Éric Srecki of France, silver medalist Pavel Kolobkov of the Unified Team (now representing Russia), bronze medalist Jean-Michel Henry of France, fourth-place finisher Kaido Kaaberma of Estonia, and quarterfinalists Elmar Borrmann of Germany, Iván Kovács of Hungary, Angelo Mazzoni of Italy, and Mauricio Rivas of Colombia. Kolobkov had won the World Championship in 1993 and 1994; Srecki was the reigning World Champion having won in 1995.

Belarus, the Czech Republic, and Russia each made their debut in the event. France, Sweden, and the United States each appeared for the 20th time, tied for most among nations.

== Competition format ==
The 1996 tournament eliminated pool play, a staple of Olympic fencing since 1896. The double-elimination rounds that had been used for the past few Games were also eliminated. For the first time, the format consisted entirely of a single-elimination bracket with a bronze medal match. The 15-touch bout was introduced for the first time, with all bouts being to 15 touches. The number of fencers was also reduced.

== Schedule ==
All times are Eastern Daylight Time (UTC-4)

Date	Time	Round
Saturday, 20 July 1996		Round of 64; Round of 32; Round of 16; Quarterfinals; Semifinals; Bronze medal match Final

== Results ==
=== Section 1 ===
Round of 64
Valery Zakharevich (RUS)	15
Fernando de la Peña (ESP)	8
Elmar Borrmann (GER)	15
Lee Sang-Gi (KOR)	14
Géza Imre (HUN)	15
Paris Inostroza (CHI)	12

Round of 32
Sandro Cuomo (ITA)	15
Valery Zakharevich (RUS)	14
Andrus Kajak (EST)	15
Krisztián Kulcsár (HUN)	14
Maurizio Randazzo (ITA)	14
Elmar Borrmann (GER)	15
Géza Imre (HUN)	15
Péter Vánky (SWE)	14

Round of 16
Sandro Cuomo (ITA)	15
Andrus Kajak (EST)	14
Elmar Borrmann (GER)	14
Géza Imre (HUN)	15

Quarterfinals
Sandro Cuomo (ITA)	14
Géza Imre (HUN)	15

=== Section 2 ===
Round of 64
Tamir Bloom (USA)	15
Olivier Jacquet (SUI)	13
Zhao Gang (CHN)	15
Iliya Mechkov (BUL)	12
Iván Trevejo (CUB)	15
Aurel Bratu (ROU)	10
Jang Tae-Seok (KOR)	15
Roman Jecmínek (CZE)	13

Round of 32
Robert Leroux (FRA)	15
Tamir Bloom (USA)	9
Zhao Gang (CHN)	6
Kaido Kaaberma (EST)	15
Danek Nowosielski (CAN)	14
Iván Trevejo (CUB)	15
Jang Tae-Seok (KOR)	13
Arnd Schmitt (GER)	15

Round of 16
Robert Leroux (FRA)	14
Kaido Kaaberma (EST)	15
Iván Trevejo (CUB)	15
Arnd Schmitt (GER)	8

Quarterfinals
Kaido Kaaberma (EST)	14
Iván Trevejo (CUB)	15

=== Section 3 ===
Round of 64
Michael Marx (USA)	15
James Ransom (CAN)	9
Marius Strzalka (GER)	15
Gabriel Pantelimon (ROU)	12
Vitaly Zakharov (BLR)	15
Nuno Frazão (POR)	11

Round of 32
Iván Kovács (HUN)	15
Michael Marx (USA)	6
Yang Noe-Seong (KOR)	14
Pavel Kolobkov (RUS)	15
Jean-Marc Chouinard (CAN)	12
Marius Strzalka (GER)	15
Vitaly Zakharov (BLR)	11
Angelo Mazzoni (ITA)	15

Round of 16
Iván Kovács (HUN)	15
Pavel Kolobkov (RUS)	11
Marius Strzalka (GER)	15
Angelo Mazzoni (ITA)	13

Quarterfinals
Iván Kovács (HUN)	15
Marius Strzalka (GER)	13

=== Section 4 ===
Round of 64
Gheorghe Epurescu (ROU)	15
Oscar Fernández (ESP)	10
Jim Carpenter (USA)	15
Juan Miguel Paz (COL)	11
Cesar González (ESP)	15
Meelis Loit (EST)	14

Round of 32
Jean-Michel Henry (FRA)	15
Gheorghe Epurescu (ROU)	9
Jim Carpenter (USA)	9
Mauricio Rivas (COL)	15
Nic Bürgin (SUI)	12
Aleksandr Beketov (RUS)	15
Cesar González (ESP)	11
Éric Srecki (FRA)	15

Round of 16
Jean-Michel Henry (FRA)	15
Mauricio Rivas (COL)	11
Aleksandr Beketov (RUS)	15
Éric Srecki (FRA)	10

Quarterfinals
Jean-Michel Henry (FRA)	13
Aleksandr Beketov (RUS)	15

=== Finals ===
Semifinals
Géza Imre (HUN)	10
Iván Trevejo (CUB)	15
Iván Kovács (HUN)	8
Aleksandr Beketov (RUS)	15

Final
Iván Trevejo (CUB)	14
Aleksandr Beketov (RUS)	15
Bronze medal match
Géza Imre (HUN)	15
Iván Kovács (HUN)	9

== Results summary ==
Rank	Fencer	Nation
1st place, gold medalist(s)	Aleksandr Beketov	Russia
2nd place, silver medalist(s)	Iván Trevejo	Cuba
3rd place, bronze medalist(s)	Géza Imre	Hungary
4	Iván Kovács	Hungary
5	Sandro Cuomo	Italy
6	Jean-Michel Henry	France
7	Kaido Kaaberma	Estonia
8	Marius Strzalka	Germany
9	Éric Srecki	France
10	Arnd Schmitt	Germany
11	Angelo Mazzoni	Italy
12	Robert Leroux	France
13	Mauricio Rivas	Colombia
14	Pavel Kolobkov	Russia
15	Andrus Kajak	Estonia
16	Elmar Borrmann	Germany
17	Péter Vánky	Sweden
18	Maurizio Randazzo	Italy
19	Jean-Marc Chouinard	Canada
20	Danek Nowosielski	Canada
21	Nic Bürgin	Switzerland
22	Krisztián Kulcsár	Hungary
23	Yang Noe-Seong	South Korea
24	Zhao Gang	China
25	Jim Carpenter	United States
26	Vitaly Zakharov	Belarus
27	Jang Tae-Seok	South Korea
28	Mike Marx	United States
29	César González	Spain
30	Valery Zakharevich	Russia
31	Tamir Bloom	United States
32	Gheorghe Epurescu	Romania
33	Oscar Fernández	Spain
34	Olivier Jacquet	Switzerland
35	Meelis Loit	Estonia
36	Fernando de la Peña	Spain
37	Roman Ječmínek	Czech Republic
38	James Ransom	Canada
39	Nuno Frazão	Portugal
40	Paris Inostroza	Chile
41	Juan Miguel Paz	Colombia
42	Lee Sang-Gi	South Korea
43	Gabriel Pantelimon	Romania
44	Iliya Mechkov	Bulgaria
45	Aurel Bratu	Romania
