= Fencing at the 1996 Summer Olympics – Men's team épée =

Men's team épée at the Games of the XXVI Olympiad
- Venue: Georgia World Congress Center
- Dates: 23 July 1996
- Competitors: 33 from 11 nations

Medalists
1st place, gold medalist(s)		Sandro Cuomo; Angelo Mazzoni; Maurizio Randazzo	Italy
2nd place, silver medalist(s)		Aleksandr Beketov; Pavel Kolobkov; Valery Zakharevich	Russia
3rd place, bronze medalist(s)		Jean-Michel Henry; Éric Srecki; Robert Leroux	France

The men's team épée was one of ten fencing events on the fencing at the 1996 Summer Olympics programme. It was the twentieth appearance of the event. The competition was held on 23 July 1996. 33 fencers from 11 nations competed.

== Draw ==
=== Finals ===
1/16
08:30
Italy
bye
08:30
United States	45
South Korea	41
08:30
Germany
bye
08:30
Estonia
bye
08:30
Hungary
bye
08:30
Russia	45
Romania	35
08:30
France
bye
08:30
Spain	45
Canada	41

Quarterfinals
10:00
Italy	45
United States	44
10:00
Germany	45
Estonia	39
10:00
Hungary	39
Russia	45
10:00
France	45
Spain	38

Semifinals
11:25
Italy	45
Germany	44
11:25
Russia	45
France	42

Gold medal final
19:50
Italy	45
Russia	43
Bronze medal final
18:30
Germany	42
France	45

== Rosters ==
Canada – 9th place

- Jean-Marc Chouinard
- Danek Nowosielski
- James Ransom

Estonia – 5th place

- Kaido Kaaberma
- Andrus Kajak
- Meelis Loit

France

- Jean-Michel Henry
- Éric Srecki
- Robert Leroux

Germany – 4th place

- Elmar Borrmann
- Arnd Schmitt
- Marius Strzalka

Hungary – 6th place

- Géza Imre
- Iván Kovács
- Krisztián Kulcsár

Italy

- Sandro Cuomo
- Angelo Mazzoni
- Maurizio Randazzo

Romania – 11th place

- Aurel Bratu
- Gheorghe Epurescu
- Gabriel Pantelimon

Russia

- Aleksandr Beketov
- Pavel Kolobkov
- Valery Zakharevich

South Korea – 10th place

- Jang Tae-Seok
- Lee Sang-Gi
- Yang Noe-Seong

Spain – 7th place

- Oscar Fernández
- César González
- Raúl Maroto

United States – 8th place

- Tamir Bloom
- Jim Carpenter
- Mike Marx
