= Judo at the 1996 Summer Olympics – Women's 52 kg =

Women's 52 kg at the Games of the XXVI Olympiad
- Venue: Georgia World Congress Center
- Date: 25 July 1996
- Competitors: 21 from 21 nations

Medalists
1st place, gold medalist(s)		Marie-Claire Restoux	France
2nd place, silver medalist(s)		Hyun Sook-hee	South Korea
3rd place, bronze medalist(s)		Noriko Sugawara	Japan
3rd place, bronze medalist(s)		Legna Verdecia	Cuba

These are the results of the women's 52 kg (also known as half lightweight) competition in judo at the 1996 Summer Olympics in Atlanta, Georgia. A total of 21 women competed in this event, limited to jūdōka whose body weight was less than, or equal to, 61 kilograms. Competition took place on July 23 of 1996 in the Georgia World Congress Center.

== Results ==
The gold and silver medalists were determined by the final match of the main single-elimination bracket.

Round of 32
Sharon Rendle (GBR)	L
Lynda Mekzine (ALG)	W
Isabelle Schmutz (SUI)	L
Marina Kovrigina (RUS)	W
Heidi Goossens (BEL)	L
Marisa Pedulla (USA)	W
Hyun Sook-hee (KOR)	W
Alessandra Giungi (ITA)	L
Noriko Sugawara (JPN)	W
Wang Jin (CHN)	L

Round of 16
Ewa Larysa Krause (POL)	W
Lynda Mekzine (ALG)	L
Almudena Muñoz (ESP)	W
Marina Kovrigina (RUS)	L
Katty Santaella (VEN)	L
Marisa Pedulla (USA)	W
Cathy Brain-Grainger (AUS)	L
Marie-Claire Restoux (FRA)	W
Carolina Mariani (ARG)	W
Nathalie Gosselin (CAN)	L
Tseng Hsiao-fen (TPE)	L
Hyun Sook-hee (KOR)	W
Alexa von Schwichow (GER)	L
Legna Verdecia (CUB)	W
Noriko Sugawara (JPN)	W
Sunith Thakur (IND)	L

Quarterfinals
Ewa-Larysa Krause (POL)	W
Almudena Muñoz (ESP)	L
Marisa Pedulla (USA)	L
Marie-Claire Restoux (FRA)	W
Carolina Mariani (ARG)	L
Hyun Sook-hee (KOR)	W
Legna Verdecia (CUB)	W
Noriko Sugawara (JPN)	L

Semifinals
Ewa-Larysa Krause (POL)	L
Marie-Claire Restoux (FRA)	W
Hyun Sook-hee (KOR)	W
Legna Verdecia (CUB)	L

Gold medal final
Marie-Claire Restoux (FRA)	W
Hyun Sook-hee (KOR)	L

=== Repechage ===
The losing semifinalists as well as those judoka eliminated in earlier rounds by the four semifinalists of the main bracket advanced to the repechage. These matches determined the two bronze medalists for the event.

First round
Tseng Hsiao-fen (TPE)	L
Alessandra Giungi (ITA)	W

Second round
Lynda Mekzine (ALG)	L
Almudena Muñoz (ESP)	W
Marisa Pedulla (USA)	W
Cathy Brain-Grainger (AUS)	L
Carolina Mariani (ARG)	W
Alessandra Giungi (ITA)	L
Alexa von Schwichow (GER)	L
Noriko Sugawara (JPN)	W

Third round
Almudena Muñoz (ESP)	W
Marisa Pedulla (USA)	L
Carolina Mariani (ARG)	L
Noriko Sugawara (JPN)	W

Bronze medal finals
Legna Verdecia (CUB)	W
Almudena Muñoz (ESP)	L
Ewa-Larysa Krause (POL)	L
Noriko Sugawara (JPN)	W
