= Stéphane Cordinier =

French handball player (born 1970)

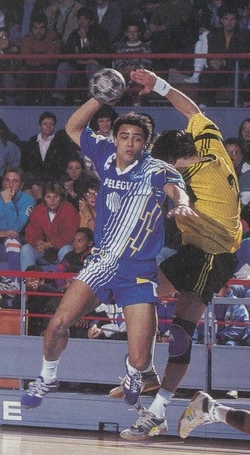
- Stéphane Cordinier (1992)

Personal information
- Nationality: French
- Born: 17 April 1970 (age 56) Créteil, France
- Height: 179 cm (70 in)

Sport
- Sport: Handball
- Position: Left wing

Youth career
- Years: Team
- -1989: US Créteil HB

Senior clubs
- Years: Team
- 1989-1993: US Créteil HB
- 1993-1998: PSG-Asnières
- 1998-1999: TV Niederwürzbach
National team
Years	Team	Apps
1993-1999	France	92
Medal record
Representing France
World Championship
Bronze medal – third place	1997 Japan
Mediterranean Games
Silver medal – second place	1993 Languedoc-Roussillon

Stéphane Cordinier (born 17 April 1970) is a French handball player. He competed in the men's tournament at the 1996 Summer Olympics.

== Career ==
Cordinier started playing handball at US Créteil HB, where he made his debut in 1989. He then joined PSG-Asnières. In 1998 he joined TV Niederwürzbach together with national team colleagues François-Xavier Houlet, Stéphane Joulin and Philippe Schaaf. He volunteered to be released of his contract in 1999 due to the club's financial trouble, and he subsequently retired at the age of 29.

=== National team ===
Cordinier debuted for the French national team in 1993. The same year he won silver medals at the 1993 Mediterranean Games. At the 1996 European Men's Handball Championship he played three games, when France finished 7th.

He then represented France at the 1996 Olympics, where they finished 4th. At the 1997 World Championship he won bronze medals.

== Private ==
His son Isaïa Cordinier is a professional basketball player.
