= Alexa von Schwichow =

German judoka

Personal information
- Nationality: German
- Born: 17 September 1975 (age 51) Offenbach am Main, West Germany

Sport
- Sport: Judo

Alexa von Schwichow (born 17 September 1975) is a German former judoka. She competed in the women's half-lightweight event at the 1996 Summer Olympics.
