= US Créteil Handball =

French handball club

- Full name: Union Sportive Créteil Handball
- Nickname: Les Béliers
- Short name: Créteil
- Founded: 1964; 62 years ago
- Arena: Palais des Sports Robert Oubron
- Capacity: 2,500
- President: Jean-Luc Druais
- Head coach: Fernando Barbeito
- League: LNH Division 1
- 2024–25: LNH Division 1, 15th of 16 (relegated)
- Club colours
Home	Away

US Créteil Handball is a French handball team based in Créteil, a suburb of Paris, that plays in the LNH Division 1.

In the late 1980's it was one of the best teams in France, where they won the French Championship and Cup in 1989 and reached the final of the EHF Cup Winners' Cup in 1989 and the semifinal of the 1990 European Cup.

Location of US Créteil Handball

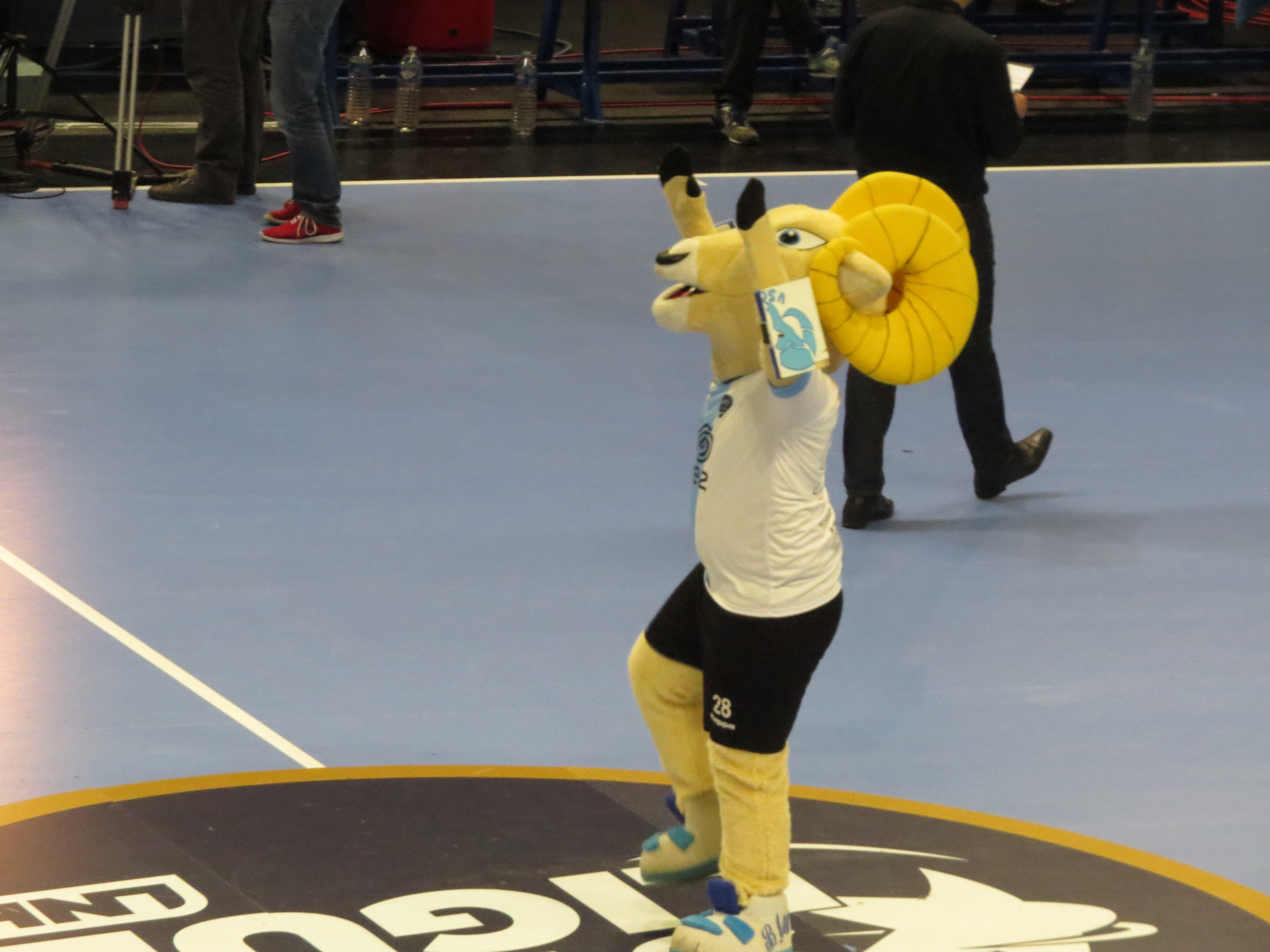
Billy – the official mascot of US Créteil Handball.

== Crest, colours, supporters ==
=== Naming history ===
Name	Period
US Créteil Handball	1964–present

=== Kit manufacturers ===
Period	Kit manufacturer
2002–2010	(Japan) Asics
2010–2014	(Germany) Puma
2014–2020	(Italy) Kappa
2020–present	(Denmark) Hummel

=== Kits ===
HOME
2020-21	2021-22	2023-24

AWAY
2013-14	2016-17	2020-21	2021-22	2023-24

== Team ==
=== Current squad ===
Squad for the 2022–23 season

US Créteil Handball

Goalkeepers

- 1 (France) Dylan Soyez
- 16 (Serbia) Todor Jandrić

Left Wingers

- 34 (France) Samuel Deen

Right Wingers

- 2 (France) Aymeric Anzuini
- 3 (Spain) Mario López Álvarez

Line Players

- 6 (France) Valentin Aman (c)
- 9 (Croatia) Ante Babić

Central Backs

- 8 (Serbia) Đorđe Đekić
- 19 (France) Antoine Ferrandier
- 35 (France) Lucas Ferrandier

Left Backs

- 11 (France) Kylian Rigault
- 13 (Brazil) Thiago Ponciano
- 25 (Spain) Pablo Paredes Lapeña

Right Backs

- 26 (Norway) Benjamin Hallgren
- 37 (Croatia) Bruno Butorac
- 44 (Ukraine) Vladyslav Dontsov

=== Technical staff ===
- Head coach: (Spain) Fernando Barbeito
- Assistant coach: (Serbia) Dragan Počuča
- Assistant coach: (France) Franck Chupin

=== Transfers ===
Transfers for the 2026–27 season

Joining

Leaving

- (Serbia) Uroš Pavlović (LP) to (Turkey) Beşiktaş JK
- (Denmark) Anders Lynge Hansen (GK) to (Denmark) Norddjurs Håndbold
- (Spain) Mario López Álvarez (RW) to (Spain) OAR BM Coruña

=== Transfer History ===
Transfers for the 2025–26 season

Joining

- (Serbia) Danilo Radović (LB) from (Germany) GWD Minden
- (Serbia) Uroš Pavlović (LP) from (Serbia) RK Metaloplastika
- (Poland) Antoni Doniecki (LP) from (France) Fenix Toulouse Handball
- (North Macedonia) Mihajlo Mladenović (LB) from (North Macedonia) RK Alkaloid
- (Spain) David Iglesias Estévez (LB) from Tremblay-en-France Handball
- (France) Boïba Sissoko (LW) from (France) USAM Nîmes Gard
- (France) Louis Joseph (RB) from (France) Istres Provence Handball

Leaving

- (Croatia) Bruno Butorac (RB) to (Hungary) Szigetszentmiklósi KSK
- (Spain) Alejandro Barbeito (CB) to (Portugal) S.L. Benfica
- (France) Rémi Leventoux (LP) to (France) CPB Rennes Handball
- (France) Valentin Aman (LP) to (France) Limoges Handball
- (France) Jason Muel (LP) to (France) C' Chartres MHB

== Results ==
- LNH Division 1:
  - Gold: 1989
  - Silver: 1988, 1997, 2004
- LNH Division 2:
  - Gold: 2011, 2014
- Coupe de France:
  - Winners: 1989, 1997
  - Finalists: 1988, 1993, 2003
- Coupe de la Ligue:
  - Winners: 2003
  - Finalists: 2004, 2008
- EHF Champions League:
  - Semifinalists: 1990
- EHF Cup Winners' Cup:
  - Finalists: 1989
- EHF Cup:
  - Semifinalists: 2006
- EHF Challenge Cup:
  - Semifinalists: 2003
- Double

Winners (1): 1988–89

== European record ==
Season	Competition	Round	Club	1st leg	2nd leg	Aggregate
2016–17	EHF Cup	R1	(Croatia) RK Zamet	29–32	27–24	56–56

== Former club members ==
=== Notable former players ===
- (France) Joël Abati (1995–1997)
- (France) Stéphane Cordinier (1989–1993)
- (France) Hugo Descat (2007–2017)
- (France) Yoann Gibelin (2017–2022)
- (France) Benoît Henry (1999–2009)
- (France) François-Xavier Houlet (1986–1990, 1994, 1996–1997)
- (France) (Cameroon) Erwan Siakam-Kadji (2014–2016)
- (France) Guéric Kervadec (1994–1997, 2002–2010)
- (France) Nicolas Lemonne (1998–2009)
- (France) Patrick Lepetit (1994–1998)
- (France) Frédéric Louis (1995–1998, 2000–2005)
- (France) Pascal Mahé (1985–1992)
- (France) Quentin Minel (2009–2016)
- (France) Pierre Montorier (2011–2014)
- (France) Olivier Nyokas (2009–2014)
- (France) Frédéric Perez (1988–1992)
- (France) Nedim Remili (2005–2016)
- (France) Mickaël Robin (2016-2021)
- (France) Philippe Schaaf (1989–1992)
- (France) Boïba Sissoko (2002-2022)
- (France) Denis Tristant (1988-1992)
- (Algeria) Belgacem Filah (2003-2004)
- (Algeria) (France) Mohamed Mokrani (2015-2017)
- (Algeria) Salim Nedjel (2003-2004)
- (Bosnia and Herzegovina) Dejan Malinović (2014-2017)
- (Bosnia and Herzegovina) Muhamed Toromanović (2014-2018)
- (Brazil) Felipe Borges (2020-2021)
- (Brazil) Thiago Ponciano (2022-)
- (Brazil) Gustavo Rodrigues (2017-2019)
- (Croatia) Bruno Butorac (2021–)
- (Croatia) Dragan Jerković (2010–2013)
- (Croatia) Igor Kos (2006-2007)
- (Croatia) Venio Losert (2009-2010)
- (Croatia) Zlatko Saračević (1994-1995)
- (Croatia) Mate Šunjić (2013–2017)
- (Lithuania) Nerijus Atajevas (2006–2012)
- (Morocco) Yassine Idrissi (2008-2009)
- (North Macedonia) Pepi Manaskov (1991-1993)
- (North Macedonia) Borko Ristovski (2014-2015)
- (Poland) Andrzej Tłuczyński (1984–1988)
- (Romania) Alexandru Csepreghi (2014–2018)
- (Romania) Eremia Pîrîianu (2005–2008)
- (Slovenia) Gorazd Škof (2013)
- (Spain) Victor Alonso (2015–2018)
- (Spain) Rafael Baena González (2012–2014)
- (Spain) Pablo Paredes Lapeña (2021–)
- (Serbia) Mile Isaković (1988–1991)
- (Serbia) Uroš Mitrović (2009–2012)
- (Serbia) Dragan Počuča (2002–2004, 2013–2016)
- (Serbia) Ivan Stanković (2011–2014)
- (Tunisia) Issam Tej (2017–2018)
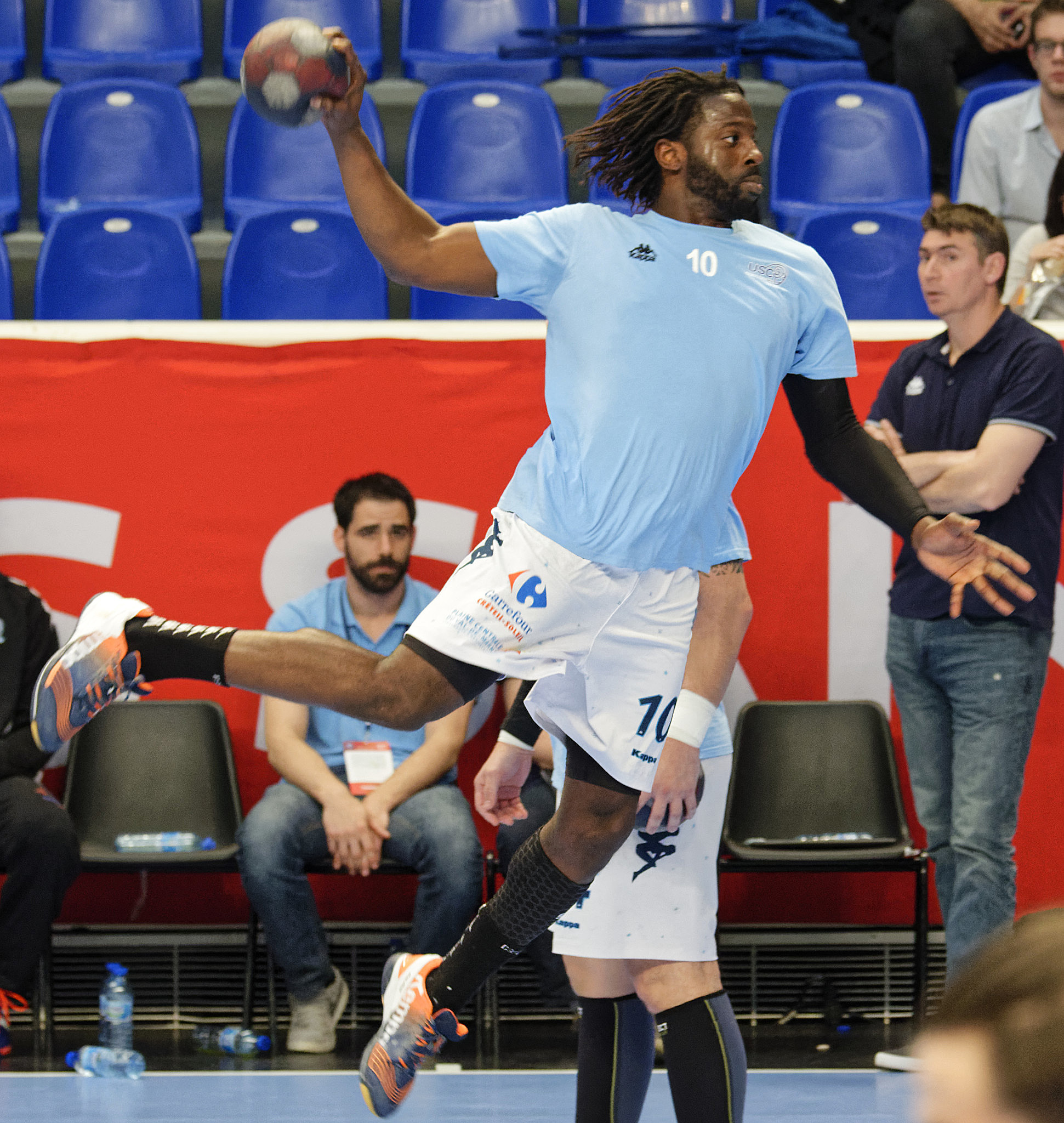
Erwan Siakam-Kadji
(2015)

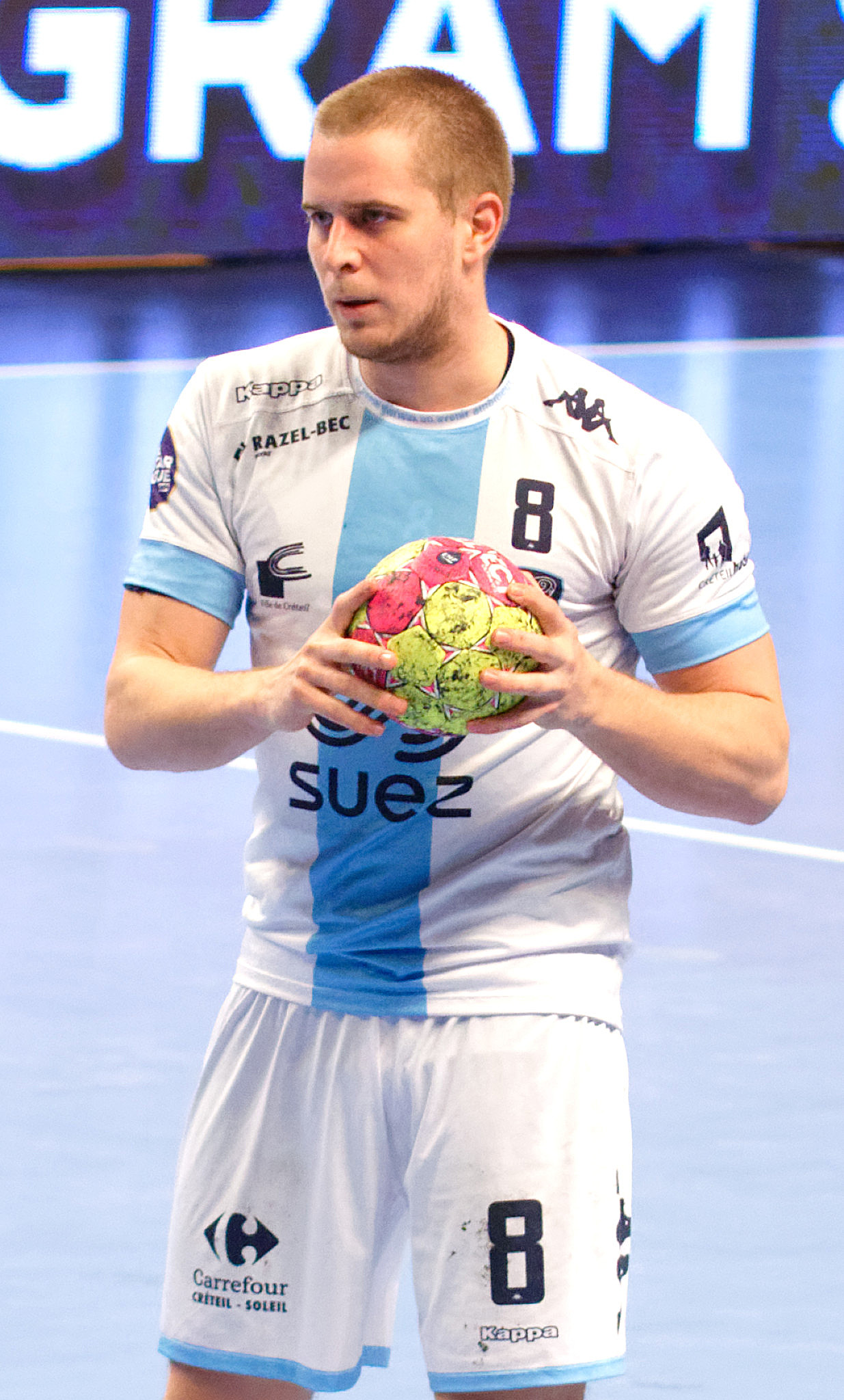
Dejan Malinović
(2016)

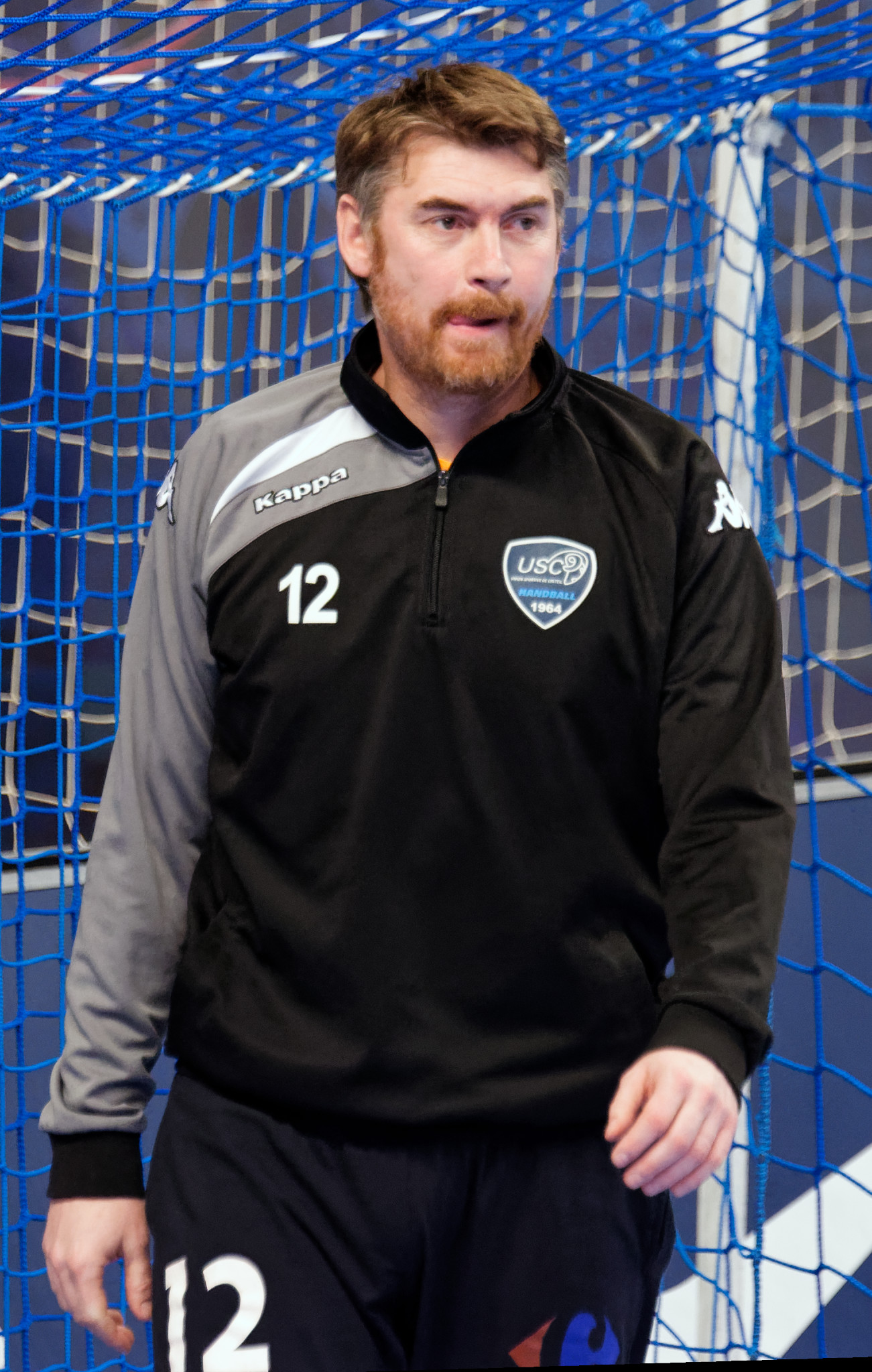
Dragan Počuča
(2015)

=== Former coaches ===
Seasons	Coach	Country
1989–1991	Branislav Pokrajac	(Serbia)
1991–1992	Bernard Boutellier	(France)
1992–1993	Christophe Esparre	(France)
1993–1994	Bernard Boutellier	(France)
1994-2004	Thierry Anti	(France)
2004–2006	Jean-Luc Le Gall	(France)
2006–2008	Mile Isaković	(Serbia)
2008–2010	David Peneau	(France)
2010–2011	Dragan Zovko	(Bosnia and Herzegovina) (France)
2011–2014	Benjamin Pavoni	(France)
2014–2018	Christophe Mazel	(France)
2018-2021	Pierre Montorier	(France)
2021	Christophe Esparre	(France)
2021–	Fernando Barbeito	(Spain)
