= SEC Football Fanfare =

- A ticket from the 2006 SEC Fanfare
- Dates: November-December
- Venue: Georgia World Congress Center

SEC Football Fanfare is an event held in the Georgia World Congress Center prior to the SEC Championship Game. Usually held the day before, and the day of the game, Fanfare allows people to enjoy festivities prior to the game.

== The event ==
Festivities in the 2006 SEC Fanfare event included field goal kicking, where people would receive three to four chances to kick a football through a life size inflatable field goal, flag football, where teams of three, four, and five would match up against each other in a small game of football, and an interactive television station including eight to ten televisions in which people could play the recently released NCAA Football 2007 on PlayStation 2's. The event, sponsored by Dr Pepper, includes stations around the Center where fans had the opportunity to enjoy different types of the company's signature drink. Lincoln Financial Sports is usually on hand, and usually, including this year, does broadcasts from the various stations around the event, highlighting the different aspects of the festivities. Other activities included in the event included face painting, where for a small prices, people could get their face painted with their team's colors, logo, mascot, or all. Famous former SEC Players were also involved in the event, and fans were given the chance to interact with the famous players by participating in various contests, most involving throwing footballs into targets down the field. Fanfare also includes a large store, in which attendees can purchase apparel and items such as hats, flags, T-shirts, and various novelty items displaying their favorite team's logo and colors. Closing out the event, just a few hours prior to the SEC Championship Game, the teams participating in the game hold pep rallies near the Fanfare. In 2006, the Arkansas Razorbacks and the eventual 2007 national champion Florida Gators both held pep rallies shortly following the end of the Fanfare.
