= Marina Kovrigina =

Russian judoka

Personal information
- Nationality: Russian
- Born: 4 May 1972 (age 54) Krasnoyarsk, Russia

Sport
- Sport: Judo

Marina Kovrigina (born 4 May 1972) is a Russian judoka. She competed in the women's half-lightweight event at the 1996 Summer Olympics.
