= Katty Santaella =

Venezuelan judoka (born 1967)

Katty Santaella OLY
Personal information
- Full name: Katiuska Santaella
- Nickname: Katty
- Born: 21 May 1967 (age 59)
- Occupation: Judoka

Sport
- Country: Venezuela
- Sport: Judo
- Weight class: –52 kg
- Rank: 6th dan black belt

Achievements and titles
- Olympic Games: R16 (1996)
- World Champ.: R32 (1993, 1995)

Profile at external databases
- IJF: 41602
- JudoInside.com: 9499
- Updated on 13 March 2023

Katty Santaella (born 21 May 1967) is a Venezuelan judoka. She competed in the women's half-lightweight event at the 1996 Summer Olympics.
