= Wang Jin (judoka) =

Chinese judoka (born 1972)

Personal information
- Born: 13 September 1972 (age 52)
- Occupation: Judoka

Sport
- Sport: Judo

Profile at external databases
- JudoInside.com: 14648

Wang Jin (Chinese: 王瑾, born 13 September 1972) is a Chinese former judoka. She competed at the 1996 Summer Olympics in Women's 52 kg (half lightweight) competition.
