= Tseng Hsiao-fen =

Taiwanese judoka (born 1972)

Personal information
- Nationality: Taiwanese
- Born: 16 November 1972 (age 53)

Sport
- Sport: Judo

Tseng Hsiao-fen (Chinese: 曾小芬; pinyin: Céng Xiǎofēn, born 16 November 1972) is a Taiwanese judoka. She competed in the women's half-lightweight event at the 1996 Summer Olympics.
