= Maurizio Randazzo =

Italian fencer (born 1964)

Personal information
- Born: 1 March 1964 (age 62) Caltanissetta, Sicily, Italy

Sport
- Sport: Fencing
- Club: Gruppo Sportivo Fiamme Oro
Medal record
Men's fencing
Representing Italy
Olympic Games
Gold medal – first place	1996 Atlanta	Team épée
Gold medal – first place	2000 Sydney	Team épée
World Championships
Gold medal – first place	1990 Lyon	Team épée
Gold medal – first place	1993 Essen	Team épée
Silver medal – second place	1985 Barcelona	Team épée
Bronze medal – third place	1986 Sofia	Team épée
Bronze medal – third place	1997 Cape Town	Team épée
Summer Universiade
Gold medal – first place	1987 Zagreb	Team épée
Gold medal – first place	1989 Duisburg	Team épée
Silver medal – second place	1989 Duisburg	Individual épée
Silver medal – second place	1991 Sheffield	Individual épée
Bronze medal – third place	1985 Kobe	Team épée
Mediterranean Games
Silver medal – second place	1997 Bari	Individual épée

Maurizio Randazzo (born 1 March 1964) is an Italian fencer who competed at three Olympic games. Randazzo is a two-time Olympic gold medalist, a two-time FISU World University Games gold medalist and a two-time fencing world champion.

== Early life ==
Randazzo was born on 1 March 1964 in Caltanissetta, Sicily, Italy.

== Fencing ==
Randazzo first won recognition at the 1985 Summer Universiade in Kobe, Japan when he helped the Italian team to bronze in the team épée. At the 1985 World Fencing Championships in Barcelona, Spain, he helped the team to silver in the same event.

A year later, he was part of the épée team which won silver at the 1986 World Fencing Championships in Sofia, Bulgaria.

At the 1987 Summer Universiade in Zagreb, Socialist Republic of Croatia, Socialist Federal Republic of Yugoslavia, he won his first gold medal with the Italian team in the team épée.

Randazzo and the Italian team retained their épée gold at the 1989 Summer Universiade in Duisburg, West Germany. In the men's épée, Randazzo also won a silver medal.

The following year, he was part of the team which won gold in the team épée at the 1990 World Fencing Championships in Lyon, France.

At his final World University Games appearance, Randazzo again won silver in the men's épée at the 1991 Summer Universiade in Sheffield, England, United Kingdom.

Randazzo made his Olympic debut at the 1992 Summer Olympics in Barcelona, Spain. He finished 15th in the men's épée and helped the Italian team to fifth in the men's team épée.

At the 1996 Summer Olympics in Atlanta, Georgia, United States, Randazzo finished 18th in the men's épée and helped the Italian team to gold in the men's team épée.

At the 2000 Summer Olympics in Sydney, New South Wales, Australia, Randazzo helped the Italian team to retain their gold in the men's team épée.

== After competition ==
On 20 November 2016, he was elected to the Federal Council of the Italian Fencing Federation and he served as deputy vice-president from March 2021 until January 2025.
