= Christophe Vicard =

French sports shooter

Personal information
- Nationality: French
- Born: 27 September 1967 (age 57); Angoulême, France

Sport
- Sport: Sports shooting

Christophe Vicard (born 27 September 1967) is a French sports shooter. He competed at the 1996 Summer Olympics and the 2000 Summer Olympics.
