= Ewa Larysa Krause =

Polish judoka

Personal information
- Nationality: Polish
- Born: 4 January 1975 Koszalin, Poland
- Died: 12 January 1997 (aged 22) Zakopane, Poland

Sport
- Sport: Judo

Ewa Larysa Krause (4 January 1975 – 12 January 1997) was a Polish judoka. She competed in the women's half-lightweight event at the 1996 Summer Olympics.
