= Sophie Moressée-Pichot =

French fencer (born 1962)

Personal information
- Born: 3 April 1962 (age 64) Sissonne, Aisne, France

Sport
- Sport: Fencing
Medal record
Women's fencing
Representing France
Olympic Games
Gold medal – first place	1996 Atlanta	Épée, team

Sophie Moressée-Pichot (born 3 April 1962) is a French fencer. She won a gold medal in the women's team épée event at the 1996 Summer Olympics.
