= Marie-Claire Restoux =

French judoka (born 1968)

Personal information
- Born: 9 April 1968 (age 58)
- Occupation: Judoka

Sport
- Country: France
- Sport: Judo
- Weight class: ‍–‍52 kg

Achievements and titles
- Olympic Games: (gold) (1996)
- World Champ.: (1995, 1997)
- European Champ.: (bronze) (1996, 1997, 1998)
Medal record
Women's judo
Representing France
Olympic Games
Gold medal – first place	1996 Atlanta	‍–‍52 kg
World Championships
Gold medal – first place	1995 Chiba	‍–‍52 kg
Gold medal – first place	1997 Paris	‍–‍52 kg
Bronze medal – third place	1999 Birmingham	‍–‍52 kg
European Championships
Bronze medal – third place	1996 The Hague	‍–‍52 kg
Bronze medal – third place	1997 Oostende	‍–‍52 kg
Bronze medal – third place	1998 Oviedo	‍–‍52 kg

Profile at external databases
- IJF: 53276
- JudoInside.com: 391
- Updated on 4 June 2023

Marie-Claire Restoux (born 9 April 1968 in La Rochefoucauld, Charente) is a French judoka, world champion and Olympic champion. She won the gold medal in the half lightweight division at the 1996 Summer Olympics in Atlanta.

She received a gold medal at the 1995 World Judo Championships, and again in 1997, and a bronze medal in 1999.
