= Casey Legler =

French swimmer (born 1977)

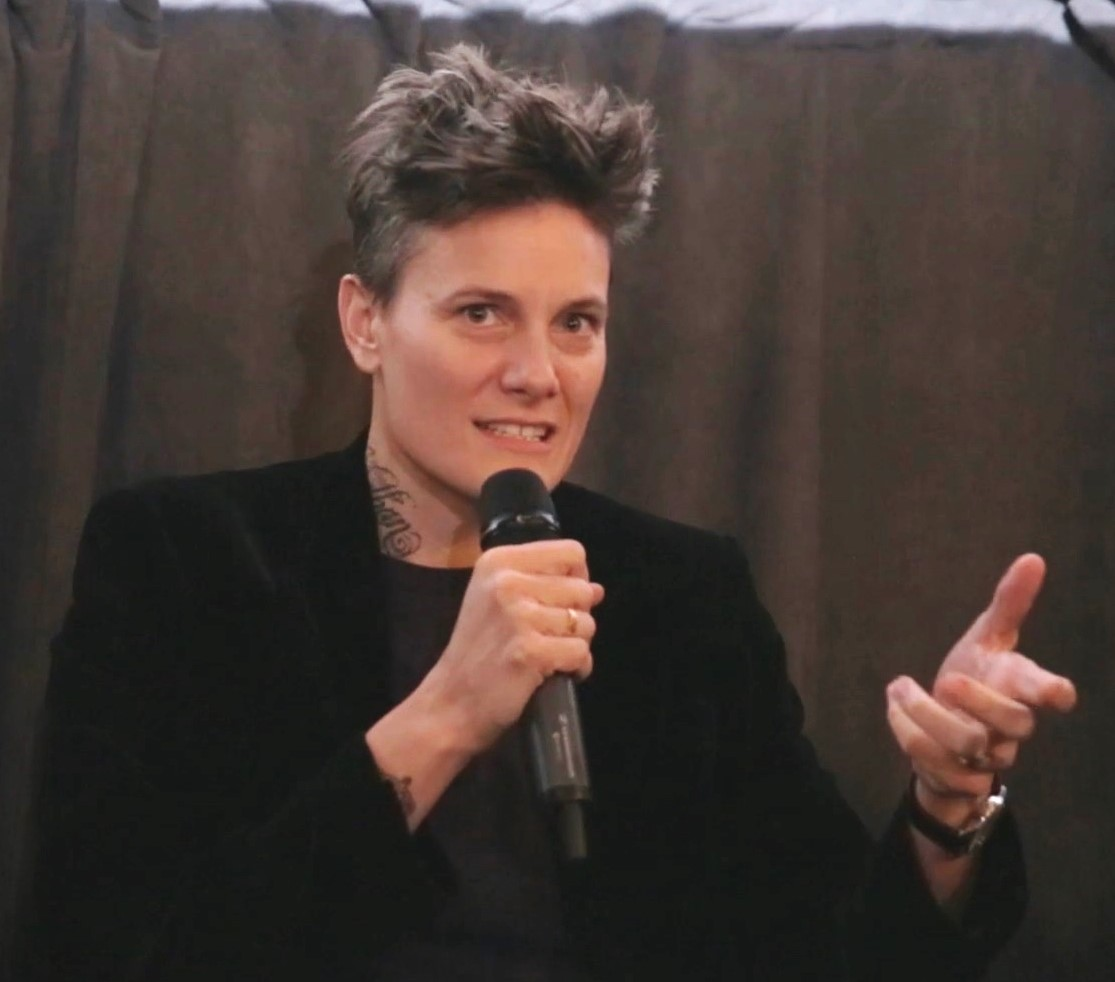
- Legler in 2017
- Born: 26 April 1977 (age 49); Fréjus, Var, France
- Education: Graduated cum laude from Smith College
- Alma mater: Phi Beta Kappa
- Known for: Olympic swimmer, model and athlete
- Notable work: Godspeed: A Memoir
- Spouse: Siri May
- Website: https://www.caseylegler.com

Casey Legler (born 26 April 1977) is a French-American writer, restaurateur, model, and former Olympic swimmer.

== Early life ==
Legler was born in Fréjus, Var, France, to expatriate American parents. They attended school in both France and America, and began competitive swimming at the age of 13. Legler identifies as "trans-butch" non-binary and uses they/them pronouns.

== Career ==
Legler competed in the 1996 Summer Olympics at the age of 19, where, after breaking the world record in practice the day before, they came 29th in the women's 50 metres freestyle event and 10th in the women's 4×100 metres freestyle relay event. Legler gave up swimming two years later and subsequently studied architecture, obtained a scholarship for law school, and began medical school. They are a member of Phi Beta Kappa and graduated cum laude from Smith College before moving to New York to focus on an artistic career.

In 2012, through a connection made by their friend the photographer Cass Bird, Legler became the first woman signed to Ford Models to exclusively model men's clothes. While no longer full time, Legler continues to model men's clothes in their spare time and their work has been featured in Vogue, Le Monde and Time.

Legler's first book, Godspeed: A Memoir, was released July 10, 2018 and is published by Simon & Schuster.

== Personal life ==
Legler now dedicates their time to writing and pursuing their love of restaurants, dividing their time between New York and Sydney with their wife, Siri May.
