= Nuno Frazão =

Portuguese fencer

Personal information
- Born: 25 December 1971 (age 54) Lisbon, Portugal

Sport
- Sport: Fencing

Nuno Frazão (born 25 December 1971) is a Portuguese fencer. He competed in the individual épée event at the 1996 Summer Olympics.
