= Frédéric Lemoine (gymnast) =

French gymnast

- Born: 13 March 1970 (age 56) Pantin, France
- Height: 1.80 m (5 ft 11 in)

Gymnastics career
- Discipline: Men's artistic gymnastics
- Country represented: France
- Gym: CSMG Epinay

Frédéric Lemoine (born 13 March 1970) is a French gymnast. He competed at the 1996 Summer Olympics.
