= Valery Zakharevich =

Russian fencer (born 1967)

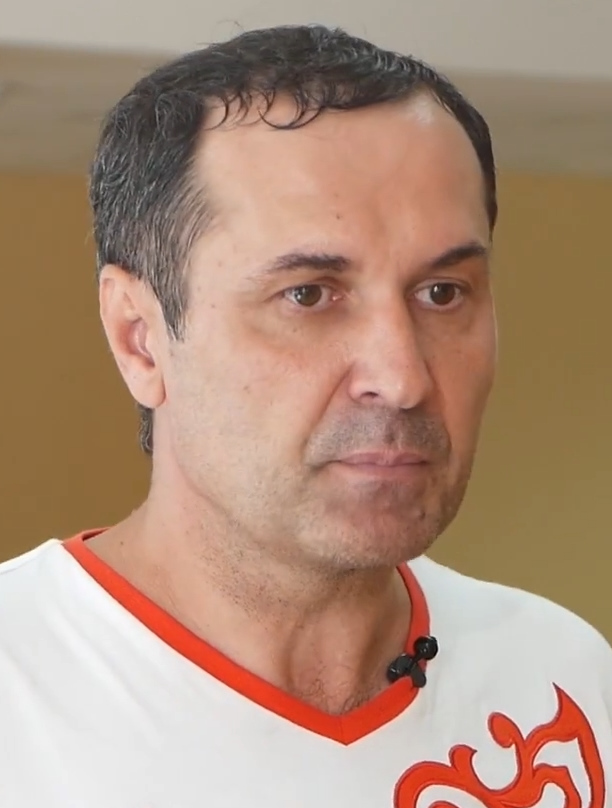
- Zakharevich in 2017

Personal information
- Born: 14 September 1967 (age 58) Bekabad, Uzbek SSR, Soviet Union

Sport
- Sport: Fencing
Medal record
Men's fencing
Olympic Games
Representing Unified Team
Bronze medal – third place	1992 Barcelona	Épée team
Representing Russia
Silver medal – second place	1996 Sydney	Épée team

Valery Vladimirovich Zakharevich (Russian: Валерий Владимирович Захаревич) (born 14 September 1967) is an Uzbekistan-born Russian fencer.

He won the bronze medal at the 1992 Summer Olympics in Barcelona and the silver medal at the 1996 Summer Olympics in Atlanta, both in the team épée competition.

He was affiliated with CSKA Samara.
