= Aleksandr Beketov =

Russian fencer (born 1970)

Personal information
- Born: 14 March 1970 (age 56) Voskresensk, Russian SFSR, Soviet Union

Sport
- Sport: Fencing
Medal record
Men's fencing
Representing Russia
Olympic Games
Gold medal – first place	1996 Atlanta	Épée Individual
Silver medal – second place	1996 Atlanta	Épée Team

Aleksandr Beketov (born 14 March 1970) is a Russian fencer and Olympic champion in the épée competition.

He won a gold medal in the épée individual and a team silver medal at the 1996 Summer Olympics in Atlanta.
