= Nic Bürgin =

Swiss fencer

Personal information
- Born: 22 December 1971 (age 54)

Sport
- Sport: Fencing

Nic Bürgin (born 22 December 1971) is a Swiss fencer. He competed in the individual épée event at the 1996 Summer Olympics.
