= Frédérick Nicolas =

French gymnast

- Born: 19 November 1974 (age 51) La Tronche, France
- Height: 1.68 m (5 ft 6 in)

Gymnastics career
- Discipline: Men's artistic gymnastics
- Country represented: France
- Gym: SDA Grenoble

Frédérick Nicolas (born 19 November 1974) is a French former gymnast. He finished thirty-third in the all around at the 1996 Summer Olympics.
