= Vladimir Latocha =

French swimmer

Personal information
- Full name: Vladimir Latocha
- Nationality: France
- Born: August 15, 1973 (age 52) Paris, France
- Height: 1.95 m (6 ft 5 in)
- Weight: 115 kg (254 lb)

Sport
- Sport: Swimming
- Strokes: Breaststroke
- Club: Dauphins du Toulouse OEC

Vladimir Latocha (born August 15, 1973) is a retired male breaststroke swimmer from France, who represented his native country at the 1996 Summer Olympics in Atlanta, Georgia. There he ended up in ninth place in the men's 100 metres breaststroke event, clocking 1:02.28 in the B-Final. He ended his career shortly after these Olympics, totalling 8 national titles and 5 national records.

He then focused on a Ph.D. in applied mathematics under Pierre Degond's supervision. After a two years postdoctoral fellowship at Kyoto University, he was recruited as an assistant professor in the mathematics department of the Faculté des Sciences et Technologies in Nancy, France, where he is still working.

In parallel, he followed his interest in bodymind modalities and trained to be a practitioner of the Feldenkrais method in Paris (2005-2009) and Somatic Experiencing in London (2016–18). After having recorded numerous Feldenkrais workshops in French on various topics, his most recent projects tend to focus on finding tools to improve physical or intellectual performance.
