= Marianne Le Verge =

French swimmer

Personal information
- Born: June 12, 1979 (age 47) Brest, France

Sport
- Sport: Swimming

Marianne Le Verge (born 12 June 1979) is a former French swimmer who competed in the 1996 Summer Olympics.
