= Peirrick Chavatte =

French swimmer

Personal information
- Born: February 10, 1974 (age 52)

Sport
- Sport: Swimming

Peirrick Chavatte (born 10 February 1974) is a French former freestyle swimmer who competed in the 1996 Summer Olympics.
