= Hyun Sook-hee =

South Korean judoka (born 1973)

Personal information
- Born: 3 March 1973 (age 53)
- Occupation: Judoka

Korean name
- Hangul: 현숙희
- Hanja: 玄淑姬
- RR: Hyeon Sukhui
- MR: Hyŏn Sukhŭi

Sport
- Country: South Korea
- Sport: Judo
- Weight class: ‍–‍52 kg

Achievements and titles
- Olympic Games: (silver) (1996)
- World Champ.: (bronze) (1997)
- Asian Champ.: (gold) (1993, 1994)
Medal record
Women's judo
Representing South Korea
Olympic Games
| Silver medal – second place | 1996 Atlanta | ‍–‍52 kg |
World Championships
| Bronze medal – third place | 1997 Paris | ‍–‍52 kg |
Asian Games
| Gold medal – first place | 1994 Hiroshima | ‍–‍52 kg |
Asian Championships
| Gold medal – first place | 1993 Macau | ‍–‍52 kg |
Summer Universiade
| Gold medal – first place | 1995 Fukuoka | Team |
| Silver medal – second place | 1995 Fukuoka | 52 kg |

Profile at external databases
- IJF: 9332
- JudoInside.com: 3671
- Updated on 4 June 2023

Hyun Sook-hee (Korean: 현숙희; Hanja: 玄淑姬; born 3 March 1973, in Seoul, South Korea) is a South Korean judoka.

Hyun won the silver medal in the half-lightweight division (‍–‍52 kg) at the 1996 Summer Olympics. She also won bronze at the 1997 World Judo Championships in Paris, France.

In 2002, she earned an international judo referee licence from International Judo Federation, and is currently serving as a judo coach for Kwangyoung Girl's High School in Seoul, Korea.
