= Iliya Mechkov =

Bulgarian fencer

Personal information
- Nationality: Bulgarian
- Born: 4 September 1969 (age 56) Sofia, Bulgaria
- Height: 6 ft 0 in (183 cm)
- Weight: 175 lb (79 kg)

Sport
- Country: Bulgaria
- Sport: Fencing
- Event: Individual Men's Épée

Achievements and titles
- Olympic finals: 1996

Iliya Mechkov (Bulgarian: Илия Мечков, born 4 September 1969) is a Bulgarian fencer. He competed in the individual épée event at the 1996 Summer Olympics. Mechkov has been a coach at Windy City Fencing Academy in Chicago, Olympia Fencing Center in Cambridge, Massachusetts and currently coaches at Cavalier Fencing Club in Burlington, Massachusetts.
