= Nicolas Gruson =

French swimmer (1974–2024)

Personal information
- Born: 26 September 1974 Dinard, France
- Died: 2 June 2024 (aged 49) Dinard

Sport
- Sport: Swimming

Nicolas Gruson (26 September 1974 – 2 June 2024) was a French swimmer who competed in the 1996 Summer Olympics. Gruson died in June 2024, at the age of 49.
