= James Carpenter (fencer) =

American fencer (born 1962)

Personal information
- Born: April 14, 1962 (age 64) Canton, Connecticut, United States

Sport
- Sport: Fencing
Medal record
Representing United States
Pan American Games
Silver medal – second place	1991 Havana	Team épée
Bronze medal – third place	1995 Mar del Plata	Team épée

James Bernard "Jim" Carpenter (born April 14, 1962) is an American fencer. He competed in the individual and team épée events at the 1996 Summer Olympics.

He was the head coach at Stevens University for 15 years and coached at the Atlantic Fencing Academy until his retirement.

In June 2025, Jim Carpenter was inducted into the USA Fencing Hall of Fame, honoring his lifelong contributions to the USA Fencing community as an athlete, coach, and program director.

Jim began his fencing career as a walk-on at Northwestern University, training under the tutelage of the legendary Laurie Schiller and eventually helping lead as team captain.

After college, Jim lived in NYC and trained at the New York Athletic Club under the guidance of legendary fencing coach Aladar Kogler.

Jim captured a bronze medal at the 1991 Pan American Games, and a silver medal in 1995, leading to his selection to the US Olympic Team in the 1996 Atlanta Games, where he narrowly missed an Olympic team medal in a sudden death overtime loss in the team epee event. A consistent top 10 fencer in the U.S. for over a decade, Carpenter claimed five Team National Championships and two Individual National Silver Medals. His leadership extended off the piste as well, serving as Chairman of the New York Athletic Club's fencing program from 1990 to 1996.

Jim served as the U.S. Fencing Association Director for High Performance and as the USA Women's Épée National Coach, helping the team capture six medals at the 2008 Olympic Games, a breakthrough Olympics for USA Fencing with regard to medal count.

After retiring from competition following the 1996 Olympics, Jim returned to fencing in 2001 as a club coach in Texas before moving to the US East Coast NYC Metro Area and taking on the head coaching role at Stevens Institute of Technology in 2010. Jim served as head coach at Stevens until his retirement in 2025.

Jim is an avid golfer with roughly a 10-handicap.
