= James Ransom =

Canadian fencer (born 1971)

Personal information
- Born: 2 April 1971 (age 55) Toronto, Ontario, Canada

Sport
- Sport: Fencing

James Ransom (born 2 April 1971) is a Canadian fencer. He competed in the individual and team épée events at the 1996 Summer Olympics.
