= Aurel Bratu =

Romanian fencer

Personal information
- Born: 19 July 1973 (age 52)

Fencing career
- Sport: Fencing
- Country: Romania
- Weapon: épée

Aurel Bratu (born 19 July 1973) is a Romanian fencer. He competed in the individual and team épée events at the 1996 Summer Olympics.
