= Marisa Pedulla =

American judoka

Personal information
- Born: April 25, 1969 (age 57) Bellefonte, Pennsylvania, United States

Sport
- Sport: Judo

Marisa Lee Pedulla (born April 25, 1969) is an American former Olympic judoka. She was born in Bellefonte, Pennsylvania. Pedulla was member of the US Team at the 1996 Summer Olympics in the 52kg under division. She would later serve as a Coach at the US Olympic Judo team at Athens. She is a professor of biology at Montana Tech of the University of Montana. At Montana Tech, she authored "Phagedigging" - Introducing Students to Biological Research.

Padulla was a participant in season six of the American Gladiators television competition, winning her primary event.
