= Philippe Schaaf =

French handball player (born 1968)

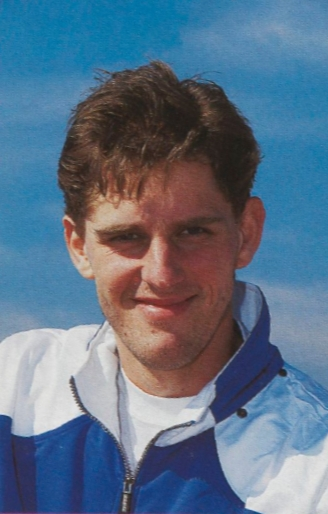

Personal information
- Nationality: French
- Born: 1 April 1968 (age 58) Strasbourg
- Height: 196 cm (77 in)

Sport
- Sport: Handball
- Position: Right back

Senior clubs
- Years: Team
- ?-1989: (France) RC Strasbourg
- 1989-1992: (France) US Créteil
- 1992-01/1993: (France) Vénissieux Handball
- 01-06/1993: (France) UMS Pontault-Combault
- 1993-1994: (France) Livry-Gargan handball
- 1994-1996: (France) US Ivry
- 1996-1999: (Germany) TV Niederwürzbach
- 08-12/1999: (Germany) TuS Schutterwald
- 12/1999-2003: (Switzerland) TV Suhr
National team
Years	Team	Apps
1988–1996	France	140
Medal record
Representing France
World Championship
Silver medal – second place	1993 Sweden
Mediterranean Games
Silver medal – second place	1993 Languedoc-Roussillon
Goodwill Games
Gold medal – first place	1994 St-Petersburg

Philippe Schaaf (born 1 April 1968) is a French team handball player.

With the French national team, he won a silver medal at the 1993 World Championship and at 1993 Mediterranean Games and a gold medal at the 1994 Goodwill Games. But at the 1996 Summer Olympics, he only placed 4th.

With clubs, he won the Coupe de France with US Ivry in 1996 and Swiss Handball League with TV Suhr in 2000. He also has been runner-up of DHB-Pokal with TV Niederwürzbach in 1998.
