= Oscar Fernández (fencer) =

Spanish fencer

Personal information
- Born: 2 March 1962 (age 64) Madrid, Spain

Sport
- Sport: Fencing

Oscar Fernández (born 2 March 1962) is a Spanish fencer. He competed in the épée events at the 1988 and 1996 Summer Olympics.
