= Mariusz Strzałka =

Polish fencer (1959–2026)

Personal information
- Born: 27 March 1959 Wrocław, Poland
- Died: 16 October 2026 (aged 67)

Sport
- Sport: Fencing
Medal record
Men's fencing
Representing Poland
Olympic Games
Silver medal – second place	1980 Moscow	Épée, team

Mariusz Strzałka (27 March 1959 – 16 October 2026) was a Polish fencer. He won a silver medal in the team épée event at the 1980 Summer Olympics. Strzałka later competed for Germany at the 1996 Summer Olympics, finishing 4th in the team épée event and 8th in the individual épée event.

Strzalka died on 16 October 2026, at the age of 67.
