= Robert Leroux (fencer) =

French fencer (born 1967)

Personal information
- Born: 22 August 1967 (age 59) Casablanca, Morocco

Sport
- Sport: Fencing
Medal record
Men's fencing
Representing France
Olympic Games
Bronze medal – third place	1996 Atlanta	Team épée
World Championships
Gold medal – first place	1994 Athens	Team épée
Silver medal – second place	1991 Budapest	Team épée
Silver medal – second place	1993 Essen	Team épée
Silver medal – second place	1995 The Hague	Individual épée
Silver medal – second place	1995 The Hague	Team épée
Bronze medal – third place	1997 Cape Town	Individual épée
Summer Universiade
Bronze medal – third place	1991 Sheffield	Individual épée
Bronze medal – third place	1991 Sheffield	Team épée

Robert Leroux (born 22 August 1967) is a French fencer. He won a bronze medal in the team épée event at the 1996 Summer Olympics.
