= Stéphane Joulin =

French handball player (born 1971)

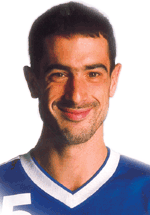

Personal information
- Full name: Stéphane Joulin
- Born: January 6, 1971 (age 55) Trier, Germany
- Height: 1.81 m (5 ft 11 1/2 in)

Sport
- Sport: Handball
- Position: Right Wing

Senior clubs
- Years: Team
- –1997: US Ivry
- 1997–1998: ThSV Eisenach
- 1998–1999: TV Niederwürzbach
- 1999–2003: ThSV Eisenach
- 2003–2004: BM Ciudad Real
- 2004–2007: Saint-Raphaël
National team
Years	Team	Apps	(Gls)
1995–2002	France	111	(334)

Stéphane Joulin (born 1971) is a now retired French team handball player. He played for club teams in the highest professional divisions in Germany and Spain and for the French team, for which he competed at the 1996 Summer Olympics and at the 2000 Summer Olympics.
