= Gheorghe Epurescu =

Romanian fencer

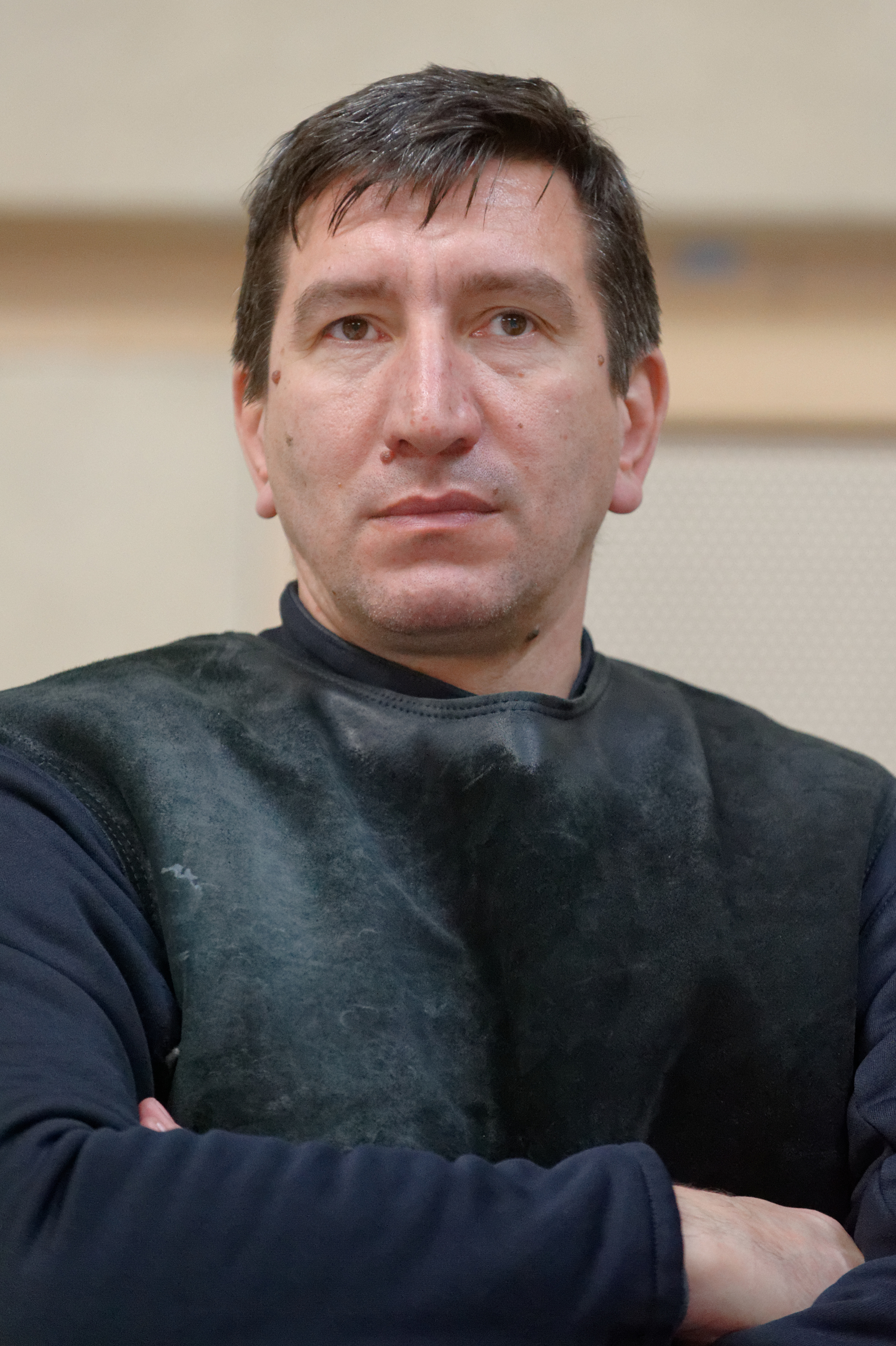

Personal information
- Born: 10 March 1970 (age 56)

Fencing career
- Sport: Fencing
- Country: Romania
- Weapon: épée
- Hand: right-handed
- National coach: Marin Ghimpușan
- Club: CSA Steaua București

Gheorghe Epurescu, better known as George Epurescu (born 10 March 1970) is a Romanian fencer. He competed in the épée events at the 1992 and 1996 Summer Olympics. He was national champion in 1995, 1997 and 2004.

He was assistant coach of the national women's épée team when it won Opympisc in 2016. As of 2017 he was head coach of the team.
