= César González (fencer) =

Spanish fencer

Personal information
- Full name: César González Llorens
- Born: 28 September 1965 (age 60) Barcelona, Spain
- Height: 190 cm (6 ft 3 in)
- Weight: 85 kg (187 lb)

Sport
- Sport: Fencing

César González Llorens (Note: In this Spanish name, the first or paternal surname is González and the second or maternal family name is Llorens.) (born 28 September 1965) is a Spanish fencer. He competed in the épée events at the 1992 and 1996 Summer Olympics.
