= Georgia World Congress Center =

Convention center in Atlanta, Georgia, United States

- Interactive map of Georgia World Congress Center
- Address: 285 Andrew Young Intl Blvd NW
- Location: Atlanta, Georgia, U.S.
- Coordinates: 33.758652°N 84.39841°W
- Owner: State of Georgia
- Public transit: Metropolitan Atlanta Rapid Transit Authority Green Line Blue Line at SEC District Red Line Gold Line at Peachtree Center

Construction
- Opened: September 8, 1976; 50 years ago
- Expanded: 1985, 1992, 2002

Website
- www.gwcc.com

The Georgia World Congress Center (GWCC) is a convention center in Atlanta, Georgia, U.S. Enclosing 3.9 million ft^{2} (360,000 m^{2}) in exhibition space and hosting more than a million visitors each year, the GWCC is the world's largest LEED certified convention center and the fourth-largest convention center in the United States. Opened in 1976, the GWCC was the first state-owned convention center established in the United States. The center is operated on behalf of the state by the Georgia World Congress Center Authority, which was chartered in 1971 by Georgia General Assembly to develop an international trade and exhibition center in Atlanta. The authority later developed the Georgia Dome, Centennial Olympic Park, and Mercedes-Benz Stadium, which replaced the Georgia Dome. In 2017, the Georgia Dome was closed on March 5 and demolished by implosion on November 20 while Mercedes-Benz Stadium officially opened on August 26. While the GWCCA owns Mercedes-Benz Stadium, AMB Group, the parent organization for the National Football League's Atlanta Falcons and Major League Soccer's Atlanta United FC, is responsible for the stadium's operations.

In addition to convention and trade shows, the GWCC often coordinated with the Georgia Dome to host activities in conjunction with major events being held at the dome. Every year, the center hosts SEC Football Fanfare, a two-day fan festival for the thousands of Southeastern Conference football fans in the city for the SEC Championship Game. The center played host to a similar event in tandem with WrestleMania XXVII, WrestleMania Axxess. Family Feud started taping at Georgia World Congress Center in 2015 and stayed there until 2017, when it moved back to Los Angeles. Feud returned to Georgia World Congress Center in August 2020 and remained there until 2021.

The GWCC is located in downtown Atlanta at 285 Andrew Young International Boulevard NW, adjacent to CNN Center and State Farm Arena. Public transportation is serviced by the SEC District MARTA station. Delta Air Lines previously had a ticket office in the lobby of the complex.

Though similarly named, the Georgia International Convention Center is a smaller unrelated facility located near Hartsfield–Jackson Atlanta International Airport.

== Layout ==
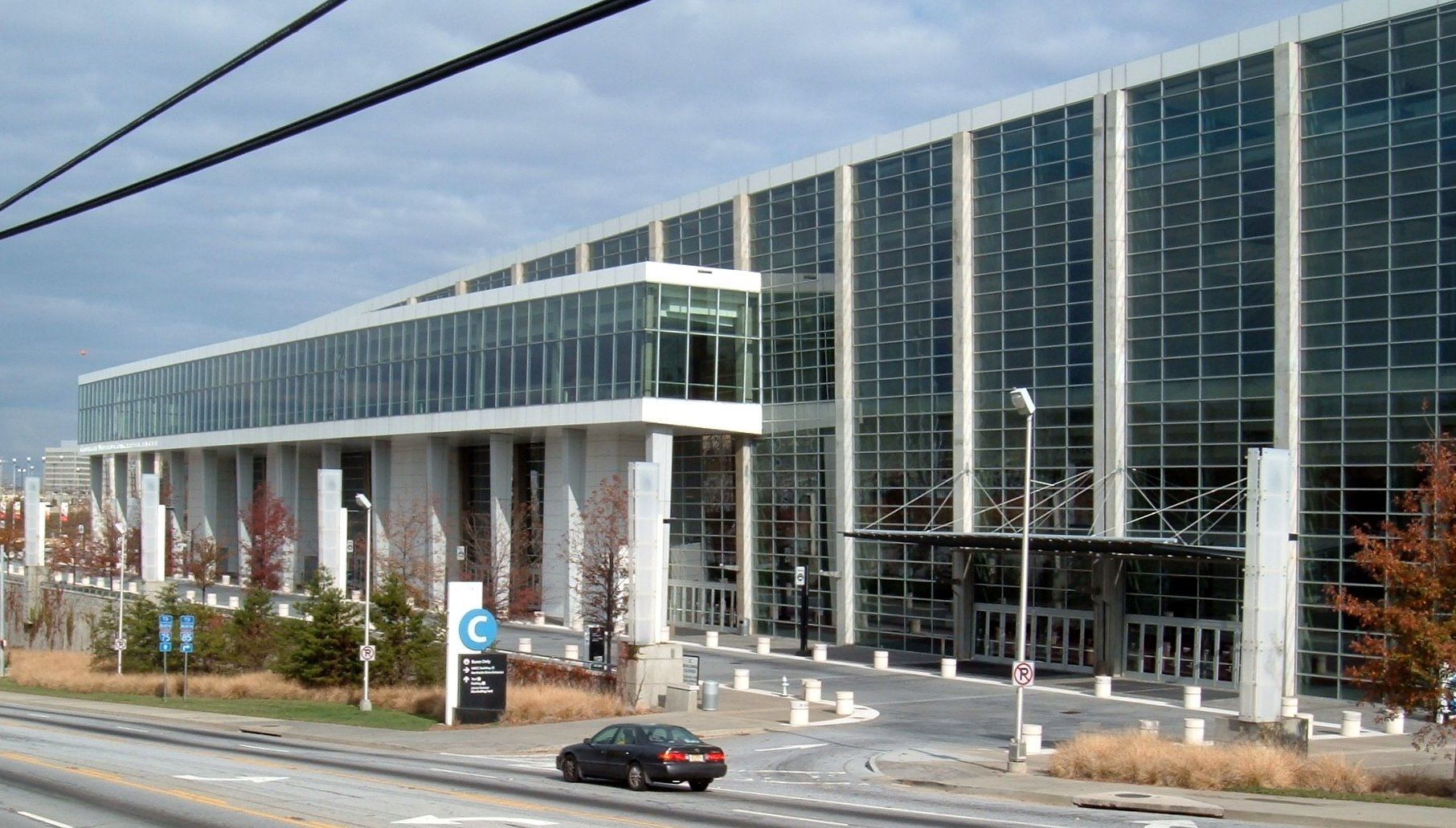
The Georgia World Congress Center in Atlanta

The GWCC is made up of three adjacent buildings, Buildings A, B, and C. In total these buildings have twelve exhibit halls, 105 meeting rooms, and two ballrooms. Building A has three exhibit halls and the Sidney Marcus auditorium seating 1,740. Building B, the largest, contains five exhibit halls and the 33,000 square-foot (3,065 m ^{2}) Thomas B. Murphy Ballroom. The newest building, Building C, has four exhibit halls and the 25,700 square-foot (2,387 m ^{2}) Georgia Ballroom. Other amenities include a FedEx Kinko's office, coffee shops, a gift shop, internet access, telephone service, full IT management, a concierge desk, and a food court plus another restaurant.

Freight rail tracks run through the middle of the complex and under the parking decks. The complex incorporates pedestrian bridges to connect exhibit halls on opposite sides of the tracks.

== History ==
=== 20th century ===
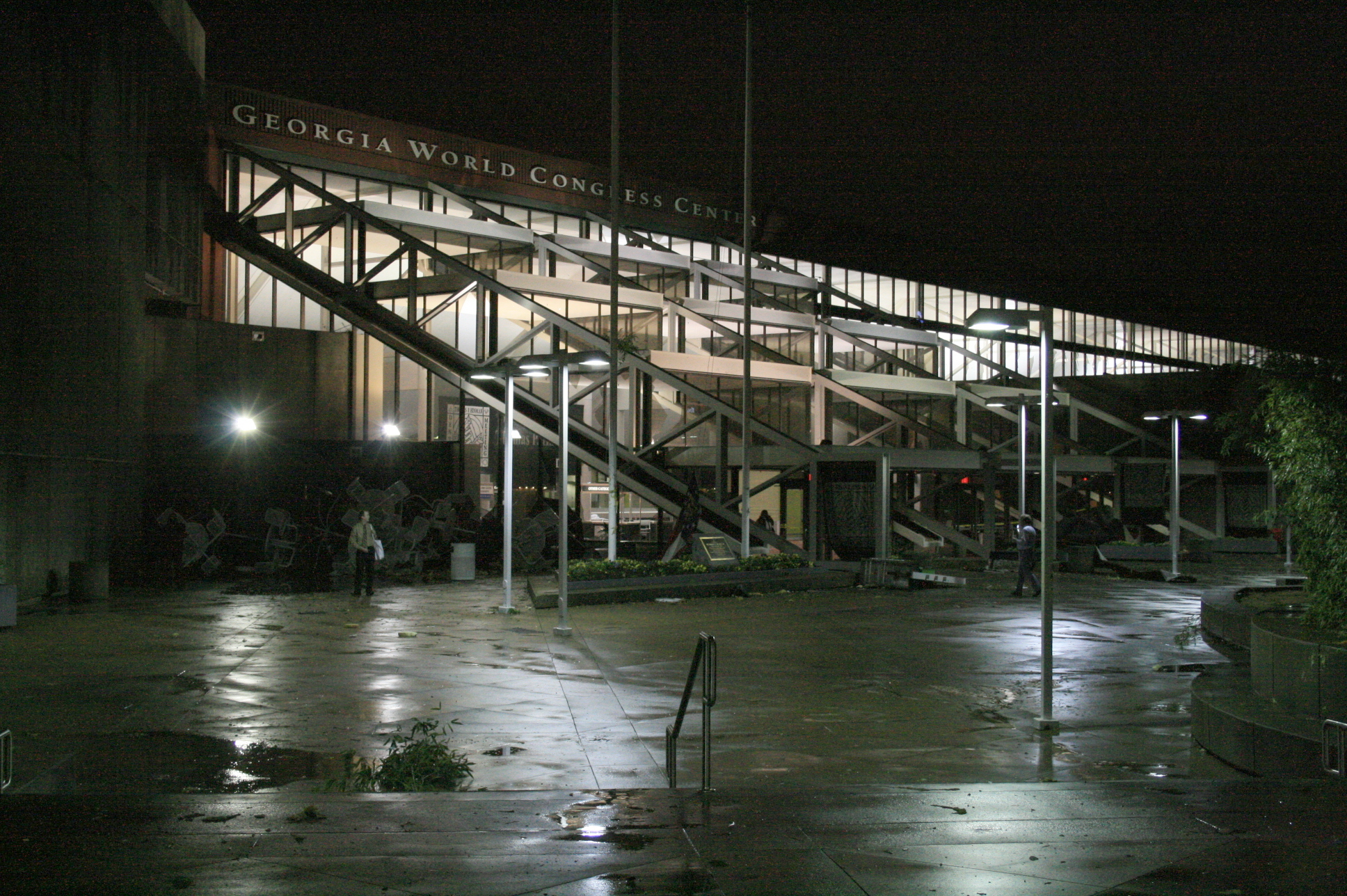
The Georgia World Congress Center on March 15, 2008 after a tornado

Opened in 1976, the George L. Smith II Georgia World Congress Center has become a cornerstone of Atlanta's downtown area. It stands as one of the largest convention centers in the United States, offering over 1.5 million square feet of exhibit space. The center has hosted numerous significant events, including major trade shows, conventions, and cultural gatherings, contributing substantially to Georgia's economy.

The Georgia World Congress Center in Atlanta is officially named the George L. Smith II Georgia World Congress Center, in honor of his service as Speaker of the Georgia House of Representatives.

Designed by Atlanta-based architects tvsdesign, formerly Thompson, Ventulett, Stainback & Associates – TVS, GWCC opened in 1976 with 350,000 square feet (33,000 m^{2}) of exhibit space. Additional phases opened in 1985, 1992, and 2002. During the 1996 Summer Olympics, the GWCC hosted handball, fencing, judo, table tennis, weightlifting, wrestling, and the fencing and shooting portions of the modern pentathlon. The International Broadcast Centre for the worldwide media was also set up inside the GWCC.

=== 21st century ===
On November 8, 2001, president George W. Bush made a speech at the GWCC in which he exhorted the crowd of police, firefighters, and politicians, saying, "My fellow Americans, let's roll!" He was invoking the last words of Todd Beamer, a passenger on United Airlines Flight 93, one of the flights hijacked during the September 11 attacks, was one of the participants in an attempt to storm the cockpit and wrest control of the airplane from the hijackers.

On March 14, 2008, a tornado struck Atlanta, including the downtown area. The Georgia World Congress Center was heavily damaged by the storm, including roof and water damage. In addition to rain pouring in from the holes in the roof, there was also water damage from the sprinkler system and broken water pipes. The extent of the damage led to the cancellation of immediate events. After the disaster, a letter was posted on GWCC's website detailing the closure of the GWCC. However, the facility along with the nearby Georgia Dome was able to be repaired enough to host the FIRST Robotics World Championship during the dates of April 18–20. The Georgia Dome and the Congress Center were also ready in time for the International Career Development Conference (ICDC) run by DECA, an association of marketing students from around the country. FBLA-PBL, a student business organization, held its opening and closing sessions for the National Leadership Conference in 2008 there. The tornado was the first to hit the downtown area since weather record keeping began in the 1880s. FBLA-PBL once again held their FBLA National Leadership Conference in the Congress Center in 2016 for Opening and Closing Session, with over 12,000 attendees. DECA once again held their DECA International Career Development Conference (ICDC) in 2018 in the facility, with over 19,000 attendees.

The center hosted the 2009 Soul Train Music Awards, the first held outside of Los Angeles.

On April 12, 2020, state officials announced plans to convert a portion of the GWCC into a temporary 200-bed hospital in response to the COVID-19 pandemic in Georgia. The temporary hospital treated coronavirus patients with mild to moderate symptoms, allowing area hospitals to allocate their resources towards treating critical patients, specifically those requiring ventilators.

== Law enforcement ==
The Georgia World Congress Center has its own Department of Public Safety, created by state legislature act HB 1475 in 1995. Although the GWCCA Police Department has statewide jurisdiction, its primary obligation is to protect the Congress Center, Georgia Dome, and Centennial Olympic Park. Joe McKinney is currently chief of the department, which employs 30 sworn officers and 46 unsworn security officers. It has both a police officer division as well as a security officer division, with bike patrol, Segway patrol and vehicle patrol.

GWCC Police car in July 2026

Preceded by London Palladium	Miss World Venue; 1991	Succeeded by Sun City
