= Fencing at the 2000 Summer Olympics – Men's épée =

Olympic fencing event

Men's épée at the Games of the XXVII Olympiad
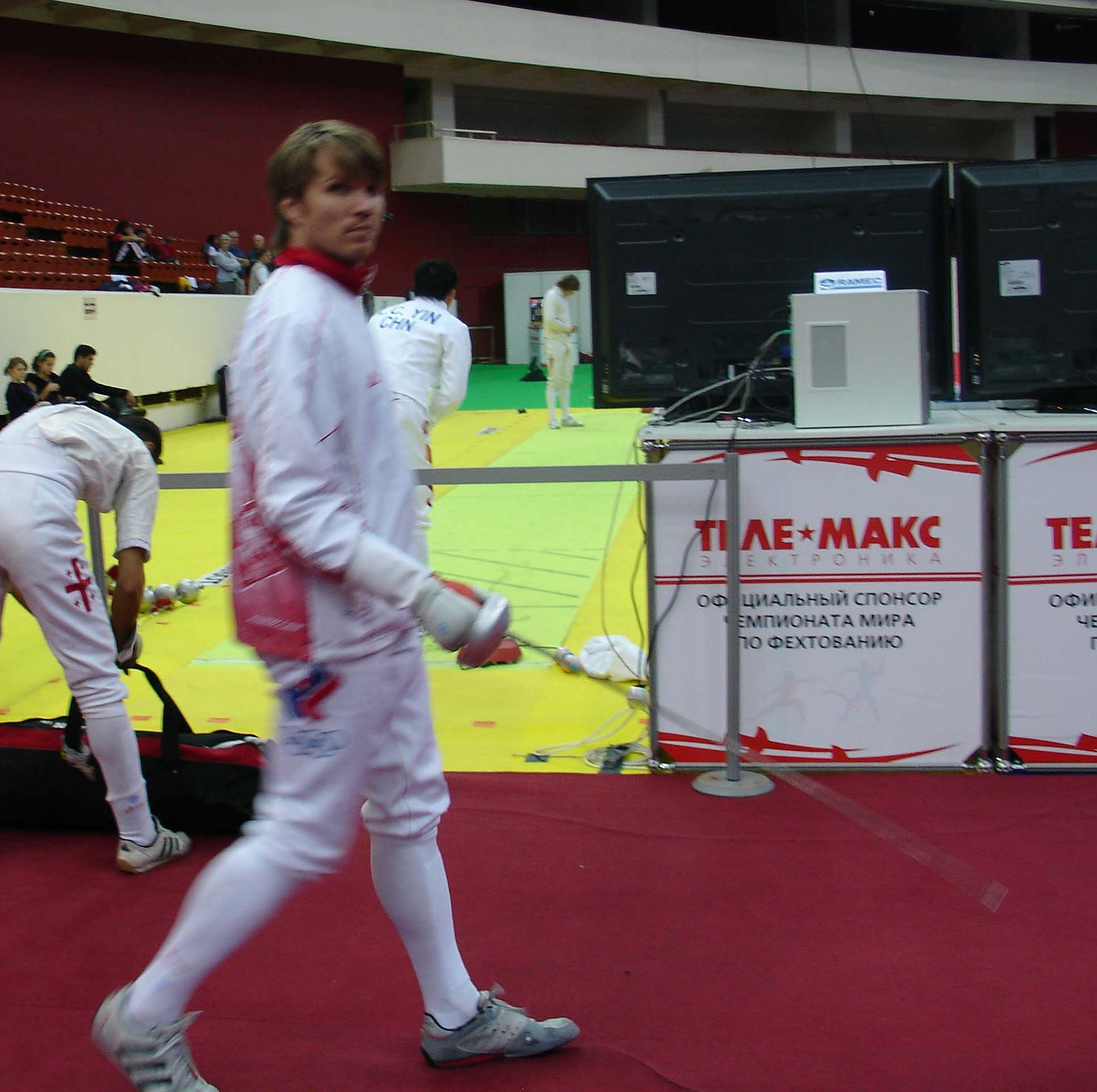
- Pavel Kolobkov (2007)
- Venue: Sydney Exhibition Centre
- Dates: 16 September
- Competitors: 42 from 22 nations

Medalists
1st place, gold medalist(s)		Pavel Kolobkov	Russia
2nd place, silver medalist(s)		Hugues Obry	France
3rd place, bronze medalist(s)		Lee Sang-ki	South Korea

The men's épée was one of ten fencing events on the fencing at the 2000 Summer Olympics programme. It was the twenty-third appearance of the event. The competition was held on 16 September 2000. 42 fencers from 22 nations competed. Each nation was limited to three fencers. The event was won by Pavel Kolobkov of Russia, the nation's second consecutive victory in the men's individual épée (Aleksandr Beketov had won in 1996). Russia joined a five-way tie for third-most gold medals in the event at two (behind Italy at six and France at five). Kolobkov, who had a silver medal in 1992 representing the Unified Team, was the 11th man to win multiple medals in the event. France's Hugues Obry took silver in Sydney, returning France to the podium after a one-Games absence snapped a four-Games medal streak. Lee Sang-ki earned South Korea's first medal in the event with his bronze.

== Background ==
This was the 23rd appearance of the event, which was not held at the first Games in 1896 (with only foil and sabre events held) but has been held at every Summer Olympics since 1900.

Three of the eight quarterfinalists from 1996 returned: silver medalist Iván Trevejo of Cuba, fourth-place finisher Iván Kovács of Hungary, and seventh-place finisher Kaido Kaaberma of Estonia. Also returning were 1992 gold medalist Éric Srecki of France and silver medalist Pavel Kolobkov of the Unified Team (representing Russia since 1996), both of whom had been defeated in the Round of 16 in 1996, as well as 1988 gold medalist Arnd Schmitt of West Germany (now Germany). Schmitt was the reigning World Champion, having won in 1999. Srecki had won both World Championships before (1995) and after (1997) his Olympic victory. Hugues Obry (1998) and Kolobkov (1993 and 1994) joined them, with the Sydney field including the last four World Champions having won the last six World Championships.

Kazakhstan, Kyrgyzstan, and Ukraine each made their debut in the event. France, Sweden, and the United States each appeared for the 21st time, tied for most among nations.

== Competition format ==
The competition continued to use the entirely single-elimination (with bronze medal match) format introduced in 1996. All bouts were to 15 touches.

== Schedule ==
All times are Australian Eastern Standard Time (UTC+10)

Date	Time	Round
Saturday, 16 September 2000	9:30; 17:30	Round of 64; Round of 32; Round of 16; Quarterfinals; Semifinals; Bronze medal match Final

== Results ==
=== Preliminary round ===
As there were more than 32 entrants in this event, ten first round matches were held to reduce the field to 32 fencers.

Meelis Loit	Estonia	15–7	Wang Weixin	China
Aleksandr Poddubny	Kyrgyzstan	15–13	Andrus Kajak	Estonia
Michael Switak	Austria	14–13	Sergey Shabalin	Kazakhstan
Oleksandr Horbachuk	Ukraine	15–14	Nelson Loyola	Cuba
Mauricio Rivas	Colombia	15–10	Nick Heffernan	Australia
Vladimir Pchenikin	Belarus	15–11	Jonathan Peña	Puerto Rico
Gerry Adams	Australia	15–13	Carlos Pedroso	Cuba
Laurie Shong	Canada	15–8	David Nathan	Australia
Zhao Gang	China	15–12	Muhannad Saif El-Din	Egypt
Tamir Bloom	United States	8–4	Andrey Murashko	Belarus

=== Main tournament bracket ===
The remaining field of 32 fencers competed in a single-elimination tournament to determine the medal winners. Semifinal losers proceeded to a bronze medal match.

Round of 32
Pavel Kolobkov; Russia	15
Meelis Loit; Estonia	9
Lee Sang-Yeop; South Korea	15
Vitaly Zhakarov (BLR)	14
Ivan Trevejo (CUB)	15
Aleksandr Poddubny; Kyrgyzstan	10
Alfredo Rota; Italy	15
Michael Switak; Austria	11
Oleksandr Horbachuk; Ukraine	9
Jörg Fiedler (GER)	8
Éric Srecki (FRA)	15
Christoph Marik (AUT)	10
Lee Sang-Gi (KOR)	15
Marc-Konstantin Steifensand (GER)	8
Mauricio Rivas (COL)	15
Kaido Kaaberma (EST)	13
Peter Vánky (SWE)	15
Vladimir Pchenikin (BLR)	9
Paolo Milanoli (ITA)	15
Angelo Mazzoni (ITA)	13
Hugues Obry (FRA)	15
Jean-François Di Martino (FRA)	12
Gerry Adams (AUS)	15
Iván Kovács (HUN)	14
Attila Fekete (HUN)	14
Laurie Shong (CAN)	13
Zhao Gang (CHN)	15
Oliver Kayser (AUT)	12
Marcel Fischer (SUI)	13
Yang Noe-Seong (KOR)	12
Arnd Schmitt (GER)	15
Tamir Bloom (USA)	12

Round of 16
Pavel Kolobkov (RUS)	15
Lee Sang-Yeop (KOR)	8
Ivan Trevejo (CUB)	15
Alfredo Rota (ITA)	12
Oleksandr Horbachuk (UKR)	11
Éric Srecki (FRA)	15
Lee Sang-Gi (KOR)	15
Mauricio Rivas (COL)	13
Peter Vánky (SWE)	15
Paolo Milanoli (ITA)	6
Hugues Obry (FRA)	15
Gerry Adams (AUS)	5
Attila Fekete (HUN)	8
Zhao Gang (CHN)	9
Marcel Fischer (SUI)	15
Arnd Schmitt (GER)	10

Quarterfinals
Pavel Kolobkov (RUS)	15
Ivan Trevejo (CUB)	14
Éric Srecki (FRA)	14
Lee Sang-Gi (KOR)	15
Peter Vánky (SWE)	12
Hugues Obry (FRA)	15
Zhao Gang (CHN)	10
Marcel Fischer (SUI)	15

Semifinals
Pavel Kolobkov (RUS)	13
Lee Sang-Gi (KOR)	9
Hugues Obry (FRA)	15
Marcel Fischer (SUI)	13

Gold medal final
Pavel Kolobkov (RUS)	15
Hugues Obry (FRA)	12
Bronze medal final
Lee Sang-Gi (KOR)	15
Marcel Fischer (SUI)	14

== Results summary ==
Rank	Fencer	Nation
1st place, gold medalist(s)	Pavel Kolobkov	Russia
2nd place, silver medalist(s)	Hugues Obry	France
3rd place, bronze medalist(s)	Lee Sang-Gi	South Korea
4	Marcel Fischer	Switzerland
5	Péter Vánky	Sweden
6	Iván Trevejo	Cuba
7	Éric Srecki	France
8	Zhao Gang	China
9	Arnd Schmitt	Germany
10	Alfredo Rota	Italy
11	Attila Fekete	Hungary
12	Lee Sang-Yeop	South Korea
13	Paolo Milanoli	Italy
14	Mauricio Rivas	Colombia
15	Gerry Adams	Australia
16	Oleksandr Horbachuk	Ukraine
17	Kaido Kaaberma	Estonia
18	Jörg Fiedler	Germany
19	Iván Kovács	Hungary
20	Oliver Kayser	Austria
21	Jean-François Di Martino	France
22	Marc-Konstantin Steifensand	Germany
23	Angelo Mazzoni	Italy
24	Vitaly Zakharov	Belarus
25	Yang Noe-Seong	South Korea
26	Christoph Marik	Austria
27	Michael Switak	Austria
28	Laurie Shong	Canada
29	Tamir Bloom	United States
30	Meelis Loit	Estonia
31	Vladimir Pchenikin	Belarus
32	Aleksandr Poddubny	Kyrgyzstan
33	Andrus Kajak	Estonia
34	Carlos Pedroso	Cuba
35	Nelson Loyola	Cuba
36	Jonathan Peña	Puerto Rico
37	Wang Weixin	China
38	Andrey Murashko	Belarus
39	Nick Heffernan	Australia
40	Sergey Shabalin	Kazakhstan
41	David Nathan	Australia
42	Muhannad Saif El-Din	Egypt
