= Fencing at the 2000 Summer Olympics – Men's team épée =

Men's team épée at the Games of the XXVII Olympiad
- Venue: Sydney Exhibition Centre
- Dates: 18 September 2000
- Competitors: 33 from 11 nations

Medalists
1st place, gold medalist(s)		Angelo Mazzoni; Paolo Milanoli; Alfredo Rota; Maurizio Randazzo	Italy
2nd place, silver medalist(s)		Jean-François Di Martino; Hugues Obry; Éric Srecki	France
3rd place, bronze medalist(s)		Carlos Pedroso; Iván Trevejo; Nelson Loyola	Cuba

The men's team épée was one of ten fencing events on the fencing at the 2000 Summer Olympics programme. It was the twenty-first appearance of the event. The competition was held on 18 September 2000. 33 fencers from 11 nations competed.

== Draw ==
The field of 11 teams competed in a single-elimination tournament to determine the medal winners. Semifinal losers proceeded to a bronze medal match. Matches were also conducted to determine the final team placements.

=== Finals ===
Round of 16
France; Hugues Obry; Eric Srecki; Jean-François Di Martino	-
Bye	-
Estonia; Meelis Loit; Kaido Kaaberma; Andrus Kajak; Nikolai Novosjolov	42
Hungary; Ivan Kovacs; Mark Marsi; Attila Fekete	45
Germany; Jörg Fiedler; Arnd Schmitt; Marc Steifensand; Daniel Strigel	-
Bye	-
Bye	-
Cuba; Nelson Loyola; Ivan Trevejo; Carlos Pedroso	-
Italy; Alfredo Rota; Angelo Mazzoni; Paolo Milanoli	-
Bye	-
Australia; Luc Cartillier; Nick Heffernan; Gerard Adams	45
China; Zhao Gang; Zhao Chunsheng; Wang Weixin	38
Austria; Oliver Kayser; Christoph Marik; Michael Switak	44
Belarus; Andrey Murashko; Vitaly Zakharov; Vladimir Pchenikin	45
Bye	-
South Korea; Lee Sang-Yeop; Yang Noe-Seong; Lee Sang-Ki	-

Quarterfinals
France; Hugues Obry; Eric Srecki; Jean-François Di Martino	43
Hungary; Ivan Kovacs; Mark Marsi; Attila Fekete	42
Germany; Jörg Fiedler; Arnd Schmitt; Marc Steifensand	44
Cuba; Nelson Loyola; Ivan Trevejo; Carlos Pedroso	45
Italy; Alfredo Rota; Angelo Mazzoni; Paolo Milanoli	45
Australia; Luc Cartillier; Nick Heffernan; Gerard Adams	34
Belarus; Andrey Murashko; Vitaly Zakharov; Vladimir Pchenikin	44
South Korea; Lee Sang-Yeop; Yang Noe-Seong; Lee Sang-Ki	45

Semifinals
France; Hugues Obry; Eric Srecki; Jean-François Di Martino	45
Cuba; Nelson Loyola; Ivan Trevejo; Carlos Pedroso	36
Italy; Alfredo Rota; Angelo Mazzoni; Paolo Milanoli	44
South Korea; Lee Sang-Yeop; Yang Noe-Seong; Lee Sang-Ki	43

Gold medal final
France; Hugues Obry; Eric Srecki; Jean-François Di Martino	38
Italy; Alfredo Rota; Maurizio Randazzo; Paolo Milanoli	39
Bronze medal final
Cuba; Nelson Loyola; Ivan Trevejo; Carlos Pedroso	45
South Korea; Lee Sang-Yeop; Yang Noe-Seong; Lee Sang-Ki	31

=== Classification 5-8 ===
Placement 5-6
Hungary; Ivan Kovacs; Mark Marsi; Attila Fekete	39
Germany; Jörg Fiedler; Arnd Schmitt; Marc Steifensand	45
Australia; Luc Cartillier; Nick Heffernan; Gerard Adams	34
Belarus; Andrey Murashko; Vitaly Zakharov; Vladimir Pchenikin	45

Fifth place match
Germany; Jörg Fiedler; Arnd Schmitt; Marc Steifensand	41
Belarus; Andrey Murashko; Vitaly Zakharov; Vladimir Pchenikin	37
Third place
Hungary; Ivan Kovacs; Mark Marsi; Attila Fekete	45
Australia; Luc Cartillier; Nick Heffernan; Gerard Adams	39

=== Classification 9-11 ===
Placement 9-11
Estonia; Meelis Loit; Kaido Kaaberma; Andrus Kajak	Bye
-	-
China; Zhao Gang; Zhao Chunsheng; Wang Weixin	35
Austria; Oliver Kayser; Christoph Marik; Michael Switak	45

Ninth place match
Estonia; Meelis Loit; Kaido Kaaberma; Andrus Kajak	45
Austria; Oliver Kayser; Christoph Marik; Michael Switak	44
Third place
-	-
China; Zhao Gang; Zhao Chunsheng; Wang Weixin	Bye
