= France at the 2000 Summer Olympics =

- IOC code: FRA
- NOC: French National Olympic and Sports Committee
- Website: www.franceolympique.com (in French)

in Sydney
- Competitors: 336 (211 men and 125 women) in 28 sports
- Flag bearer: David Douillet
- Medals Ranked 6th: Gold 13 Silver 14 Bronze 11 Total 38

Summer Olympics appearances (overview)
- 1896; 1900; ~~1904~~; 1908; 1912; 1920; 1924; 1928; 1932; 1936; 1948; 1952; 1956; 1960; 1964; 1968; 1972; 1976; 1980; 1984; 1988; 1992; 1996; 2000; 2004; 2008; 2012; 2016; 2020; 2024; 2028

Other related appearances
- 1906 Intercalated Games

France competed at the 2000 Summer Olympics in Sydney, Australia. 336 competitors, 211 men and 125 women, took part in 196 events in 28 sports.

== Medalists ==
Medal	Name	Sport	Event	Date
Gold	Brahim Asloum	Boxing	Light Flyweight	30 September
Gold	Tony Estanguet	Canoeing	Men's slalom C-1	18 September
Gold	Florian Rousseau	Cycling	Men's keirin	21 September
Gold	Florian Rousseau, Laurent Gané, Arnaud Tournant	Cycling	Men's team sprint	17 September
Gold	Félicia Ballanger	Cycling	Women's track time trial	16 September
Gold	Félicia Ballanger	Cycling	Women's sprint	17 September
Gold	Miguel Martinez	Cycling	Men's cross-country	24 September
Gold	Jean-Noël Ferrari, Brice Guyart, Patrice Lhotellier, Lionel Plumenail	Fencing	Men's team foil	22 September
Gold	David Douillet	Judo	Men's +100 kg	22 September
Gold	Séverine Vandenhende	Judo	Women's 63 kg	18 September
Gold	Franck Dumoulin	Shooting	Men's 10 m air pistol	16 September
Gold	Michel Andrieux, Jean-Christophe Rolland	Rowing	Men's coxless pair	23 September
Gold	Jean-Christophe Bette, Xavier Dorfman, Yves Hocdé, Laurent Porchier	Rowing	Men's coxless four	24 September
Silver	France national basketball team: Jim Bilba; Yann Bonato; Makan Dioumassi; Laurent Foirest; Thierry Gadou; Cyril Julian; Crawford Palmer; Antoine Rigaudeau; Stéphane Risacher; Laurent Sciarra; Moustapha Sonko; Frédéric Weis	Basketball	Men's competition	1 October
Silver	Brigitte Guibal	Canoeing	Women's slalom K-1	18 September
Silver	Florian Rousseau	Cycling	Men's sprint	20 September
Silver	Marion Clignet	Cycling	Women's individual pursuit	18 September
Silver	Hugues Obry	Fencing	Men's épée	16 September
Silver	Jean-François Di Martino, Hugues Obry, Éric Srecki	Fencing	Men's team épée	18 September
Silver	Mathieu Gourdain	Fencing	Men's sabre	21 September
Silver	Mathieu Gourdain, Julien Pillet, Cédric Séguin, Damien Touya	Fencing	Men's team sabre	24 September
Silver	Éric Poujade	Gymnastics	Men's pommel horse	24 September
Silver	Benjamin Varonian	Gymnastics	Men's horizontal bar	25 September
Silver	Larbi Benboudaoud	Judo	Men's 66 kg	16 September
Silver	Céline Lebrun	Judo	Women's 78 kg	21 September
Silver	Delphine Racinet	Shooting	Women's trap	18 September
Silver	Roxana Mărăcineanu	Swimming	Women's 200 m backstroke	22 September
Bronze	Jérôme Thomas	Boxing	Flyweight	1 October
Bronze	Anne-Lise Bardet	Canoeing	Women's slalom K-1	18 September
Bronze	Jeannie Longo	Cycling	Women's road time trial	30 September
Bronze	Laura Flessel-Colovic	Fencing	Women's épée	17 September
Bronze	Frédéric Demontfaucon	Judo	Men's 90 kg	20 September
Bronze	Stéphane Traineau	Judo	Men's 100 kg	21 September
Bronze	Thibaud Chapelle, Pascal Touron	Rowing	Men's lightweight double sculls	24 September
Bronze	Virginie Dedieu, Myriam Lignot	Synchronized swimming	Women's duet	26 September
Bronze	Patrick Chila, Jean-Philippe Gatien	Table tennis	Men's doubles	23 September
Bronze	Arnaud Di Pasquale	Tennis	Men's singles	28 September
Bronze	Pascal Gentil	Taekwondo	Men's +80 kg	30 September

== Archery ==
Sebastian Flute performed better in 2000 than he had in 1996, but still couldn't match the gold medal he had won in 1992. Jocelyn de Grandis was the only other French archer to win a match.

=== Men ===
Athlete	Event	Ranking round		Round of 64	Round of 32	Round of 16	Quarterfinals	Semifinals	Final / BM	
Athlete	Event	Score	Seed	Opposition Score	Opposition Score	Opposition Score	Opposition Score	Opposition Score	Opposition Score	Rank
Sébastien Flute	Men's individual	603	52	Şatır (TUR); W 160-156	Nesteng (NOR); W 160-148	van Zutphen (NED); W 166-159	van Alten (NED); L 102-106	Did not advance		
Jocelyn de Grandis	Men's individual	632	25	Leontiev (RUS); W 171-163	Fairweather (AUS); L 150-161	Did not advance				
Lionel Torres	Men's individual	639	11	Stubbe (GER); L 161-163	Did not advance					
Sébastien Flute; Jocelyn de Grandis; Lionel Torres	Men's team	1874	11	—N/a		Italy; L 239-250	Did not advance			

=== Women ===
Athlete	Event	Ranking round		Round of 64	Round of 32	Round of 16	Quarterfinals	Semifinals	Final / BM	
Athlete	Event	Score	Seed	Opposition Score	Opposition Score	Opposition Score	Opposition Score	Opposition Score	Opposition Score	Rank
Alexandra Fouace	Women's individual	619	42	Mensing (GER); L 149-157	Did not advance					
Sylvie Pissis	Women's individual	625	35	Wen C-l (TPE); L 149-151	Did not advance					

== Athletics ==
This was the first time since 1936 that France failed to win a single Olympic medal in athletics.

=== Men's track ===
Athlete	Event	Heat		Quarterfinal		Semifinal		Final	
Athlete	Event	Result	Rank	Result	Rank	Result	Rank	Result	Rank
David Patros	100m	10.38	5 q	10.33	6	Did not advance			
Marc Raquil	400m	45.72	3 Q	45.56	5	Did not advance			
Ibrahima Wade	400m	45.72	3 Q	45.61	5	Did not advance			
Mehdi Baala	1500m	3:40.35	1 Q	—N/a		3:38.15	4	3:34.14	4
Driss Maazouzi	1500m	3:38.88	6 Q	—N/a		3:40.23	5 Q	3:45.46	11
Mustapha Essaid	5000m	—N/a				13:40.34	13	Did not advance	
Jean-Marc Grava	110m hurdles	14.01	4 Q	14.47	8	Did not advance			
Gael Pencreach	3000m steeplechase	8:25.35	6 q	—N/a				8:41.19	14
Bouabdellah Tahri	3000m steeplechase	8:34.69	6	Did not advance					
Christophe Cheval; Needy Guims; Frederic Krantz; David Patros; Jerome Eyana (heats only)	4 × 100 m relay	39.00	1 Q	—N/a		38.64	3 Q	38.49	5
Emmanuel Front; Marc Foucan; Marc Raquil; Ibrahima Wade; Pierre-Marie Hilaire (heats only); Bruno Wavelet (heats only)	4 × 400 m relay	3:04.45	3 q	—N/a		3:00.64 SB	4 q	3:01.02	4
Abdellah Béhar	Marathon	—N/a						DNF	
Mohamed Ouaadi	Marathon	—N/a						2:14:04	8
Anthony Gillet	20km walk	—N/a						1:27:36	33
Sylvain Caudron	50km walk	—N/a						4:03:22	29
Denis Langlois	50km walk	—N/a						3:52:56	14
René Piller	50km walk	—N/a						DNF	

=== Men's field ===
Athlete	Event	Qualification		Final	
Athlete	Event	Distance	Position	Distance	Position
Ronald Servius	Long jump	7.66	28	Did not advance	
Cheikh Tidiane Toure	Long jump	7.87	20	Did not advance	
Colomba Fofana	Triple jump	14.59	36	Did not advance	
Jean Galfione	Pole vault	5.55	16	Did not advance	
Romain Mesnil	Pole vault	5.40	31	Did not advance	
David Chaussinand	Hammer throw	77.12	7 q	75.26	11
Gilles Dupray	Hammer throw	75.05	19	Did not advance	
Christophe Épalle	Hammer throw	74.22	23	Did not advance	

=== Women's track ===
Athlete	Event	Heat		Quarterfinal		Semifinal		Final	
Athlete	Event	Result	Rank	Result	Rank	Result	Rank	Result	Rank
Christine Arron	100m	11.42	1 Q	11.26	4 Q	11.42	7	Did not advance	
Sandra Citte	100m	11.47	2 Q	11.63	8	Did not advance			
Muriel Hurtis	200m	23.04	2 Q	22.98	4 Q	23.13	7	Did not advance	
Marie-José Pérec	400m	DNS		Did not advance					
Yamna Belkacem	5000m	16:08.49	12	Did not advance					
Fatima Yvelain	10000m	33:44.48	14	Did not advance					
Linda Ferga	100m hurdles	12.89	2 Q	12.88	2 Q	12.87	3 Q	13.11	7
Patricia Girard	100m hurdles	13.11	4 Q	13.43	6	Did not advance			
Nicole Ramalalanirina	100m hurdles	12.90	2 Q	12.79	3 Q	12.77	1 Q	12.91	6
Christine Arron; Sandra Citte; Fabe Dia; Linda Ferga; Muriel Hurtis	4 × 100 m relay	43.23	1 Q	—N/a		42.42	2 Q	42.42	4
Nora Leksir	20km walk	—N/a						1:35:29	22
Fatiha Ouali	20km walk	—N/a						1:35:35	23

=== Women's field ===
Athlete	Event	Qualification		Final	
Athlete	Event	Distance	Position	Distance	Position
Mélina Robert-Michon	Discus throw	54.11	29	Did not advance	
Manuela Montebrun	Hammer throw	57.77	24	Did not advance	
Nadine Auzeli	Javelin throw	53.85	29	Did not advance	
Caroline Ammel	Pole vault	4.15	17	Did not advance	
Marie Poissonnier	Pole vault	4.15	18	Did not advance	
Laurence Manfredi	Shot put	16.57	20	Did not advance	

=== Combined events ===
Decathlon

Athlete	Event	100 m	LJ	SP	HJ	400 m	110H	DT	PV	JT	1500 m	Final	Rank
Wilfrid Boulineau	Result	11.07	7.08	13.38	2.03	49.82	15.02	39.86	4.80	59.69	4:35.59	7821	20
Wilfrid Boulineau	Points	845	833	690	831	823	847	662	849	733	708	7821	20
Laurent Hernu	Result	11.19	7.14	13.54	2.06	50.63	14.51	41.78	5.00	56.34	4:37.82	7909	19
Laurent Hernu	Points	819	847	700	859	786	910	701	910	683	694	7909	19
Sebastien Levicq	Result	11.48	6.57	13.53	Did not finish								
Sebastien Levicq	Points	757	713	700	Did not finish								

Heptathlon

Athlete	Event	100H	HJ	SP	200 m	LJ	JT	800 m	Final	Rank
Eunice Barber	Result	12.97	1.84	11.27	24.47	5.93	Did not finish			
Eunice Barber	Points	1129	1029	613	936	828	Did not finish			
Nathalie Teppe	Result	14.02	1.72	13.44	26.39	5.94	46.98	2:18.56	5851	19
Nathalie Teppe	Points	976	879	757	763	831	802	843	5851	19

== Badminton ==
=== Men's singles ===
Athlete	Event	Round of 64	Round of 32	Round of 16	Quarterfinal	Semifinal	Final / BM	
Athlete	Event	Opposition Score	Opposition Score	Opposition Score	Opposition Score	Opposition Score	Opposition Score	Rank
Bertrand Gallet	Men's singles	Vasconcelos (POR); W 15–7, 15–9	Hwang S-h (KOR); L 7–15, 12–15	Did not advance				

=== Women's singles ===
Athlete	Event	Round of 64	Round of 32	Round of 16	Quarterfinal	Semifinal	Final / BM	
Athlete	Event	Opposition Score	Opposition Score	Opposition Score	Opposition Score	Opposition Score	Opposition Score	Rank
Sandra Dimbour	Women's singles	Bye	Djaelawijaya (INA); L 1–11, 6–11	Did not advance				
Tatiana Vattier	Women's singles	Yonekura (JPN); L 2–11, 3–11	Did not advance					

== Basketball ==
Men's team Roster

- Jim Bilba
- Yann Bonato
- Makan Dioumassi
- Fabien Dubos
- Laurent Foirest
- Thierry Gadou
- David Gauthier
- Cyril Julian
- Crawford Palmer
- Laurent Pluvy
- Antoine Rigaudeau
- Stéphane Risacher
- Dwayne Scholten
- Laurent Sciarra
- Moustapha Sonko
- Frédéric Weis

Women's Team Roster

- Nicole Antibe
- Lucienne Berthieu
- Johanna Boutet
- Sabine Falcoz
- Isabelle Fijalkowski
- Edwige Lawson
- Sandra Le Drean
- Nathalie Lesdema
- Isabelle Marcin
- Catherine Melain
- Laëtitia Moussard
- Audrey Sauret
- Laure Savasta
- Yannick Souvré
- Dominique Tonnerre
- Stéphanie Vivenot

Teams' results

Team	Event	Group stage						Quarterfinal	Semifinal	Final / BM	
Team	Event	Opposition Score	Opposition Score	Opposition Score	Opposition Score	Opposition Score	Rank	Opposition Score	Opposition Score	Opposition Score	Rank
France men's	Men's tournament	New Zealand; W 76-50	Lithuania; L 63-81	China; W 82-70	Italy; L 57-67	United States; L 94-106	4 Q	Canada; W 68-63	Australia; W 76-52	United States; L 75-85	2nd place, silver medalist(s)
France women's	Women's tournament	Senegal; W 75-39	Slovakia; W 58-51	Canada; W 70-58	Brazil; W 73-70 (OT)	Australia; L 62-69	2 Q	South Korea; L 58-69	—N/a	5/6th place match Russia; W 71-59	5

== Beach volleyball ==
Athlete	Event	Preliminary round	Preliminary elimination	Round of 16	Quarterfinals	Semifinals	Final	
Athlete	Event	Opposition Score	Opposition Score	Opposition Score	Opposition Score	Opposition Score	Opposition Score	Rank
Jean-Philippe Jodard; Christian Penigaud	Men's	Child – Heese (CAN); L 5-15	Heidger Jr – Wong (USA); L 2-15	Did not advance				=19
Anabelle Prawerman; Cécile Rigaux	Women's	Friedrichsen – Müsch (GER); W 16-14	Bye	Gooley – Manser (AUS); L 7-15	Did not advance			=9

== Boxing ==
Athlete	Event	Round of 32	Round of 16	Quarterfinals	Semifinals	Final	
Athlete	Event	Opposition Result	Opposition Result	Opposition Result	Opposition Result	Opposition Result	Rank
Brahim Asloum	Light flyweight	Abdelrehim (EGY); W 12–3	Viloria (USA); W 6–4	Kim K-s (KOR); W 12–8	Romero (CUB); W 13–12	Lozano (ESP); W 23–10	1st place, gold medalist(s)
Jérôme Thomas	Flyweight	Wiltshire (AUS); W 13–1	Tou (BUR); RSC	Navarro (USA); W 23–12	Zhumadilov (KAZ); L 16–22	Did not advance	3rd place, bronze medalist(s)
Rachid Bouaita	Bantamweight	Vinson (USA); L 2–9	Did not advance				
Abdel Jebahi	Lightweight	Palyani (TUR); L 4–15	Did not advance				
Willy Blain	Light welterweight	Bye	Luna (CUB); L 14–25	Did not advance			
Frédéric Esther	Light middleweight	Mishin (RUS); W 16–11	Karagollu (TUR); W 18–16	Simion (ROM); RSC	Did not advance		
John Dovi	Light heavyweight	Cox (BAR); W 14–10	Katulievsky (KGZ); RSC	Lebziak (RUS); L 11–13	Did not advance		
Jackson Chanet	Heavyweight	—N/a	Azzaoui (ALG); RSC	Ibragimov (RUS); L 13–18	Did not advance		

== Canoeing ==
=== Slalom ===
Athlete	Event	Preliminary						Final					
Athlete	Event	Run 1	Rank	Run 2	Rank	Total	Rank	Run 1	Rank	Run 2	Rank	Total	Rank
Emmanuel Brugvin	Men's C-1	132.74	4	131.02	6	269.29	6 Q	118.69	3	119.73	5	238.42	4
Tony Estanguet	Men's C-1	132.39	3	131.02	1	263.41	2 Q	115.25	1	116.62	3	231.87	1st place, gold medalist(s)
Frank Adisson; Wilfrid Forgues	Men's C-2	134.96	3	135.54	1	270.50	2 Q	119.28	1	171.63	7	290.91	7
Laurent Burtz	Men's K-1	128.15	5	129.32	11	257.47	8 Q	112.64	5	114.90	11	227.63	8
Anne-Lise Bardet	Women's K-1	154.90	10	154.18	13	309.08	11 Q	125.77	3	129.00	4	254.77	3rd place, bronze medalist(s)
Brigitte Guibal	Women's K-1	147.67	4	144.07	5	292.62	4 Q	124.98	1	126.90	3	251.88	2nd place, silver medalist(s)

=== Sprint ===
Athlete	Event	Heats		Semifinals		Final	
Athlete	Event	Time	Rank	Time	Rank	Time	Rank
Eric le Leuch	Men's C-1 500m	1:53.934	7 q	1:56.907	9	Did not advance	
Eric le Leuch	Men's C-1 1000m	3:55.726	4 q	4:02.038	3 Q	3:57.217	4
Pierre Lubac	Men's K-1 1000m	3:36.573	2 q	3:38.155	2 Q	3:37.931	7
Philippe Aubertin; Babak Amir-Tahmasseb	Men's K-2 500m	1:32.902	3 q	1:32.597	3 Q	1:48.771	4
Philippe Aubertin; Babak Amir-Tahmasseb	Men's K-2 1000m	3:14.835	3 Q	Bye		3:17.635	5
Maxime Boccon; Frederic Gauthier; Stephane Gourichon; Pierre Lubac	Men's K-4 1000m	3:05.806	7 q	3:03.703	5	Did not advance	

== Cycling ==
=== Cross Country ===
Athlete	Event	Time	Rank
Ludovic Dubau	Men's	2:16:48	18
Christophe Dupouey	Men's	DNF	
Miguel Martinez	Men's	2:09:02	1st place, gold medalist(s)
Laurence Leboucher	Women's	2:00:38	18
Sophie Villeneuve	Women's	2:02:31	23

=== Road Cycling ===
Men

Athlete	Event	Time	Rank
Laurent Brochard	Road race	5:30:46	45
Christophe Capelle	Road race	DNF	
Laurent Jalabert	Road race	5:30:34	5
Christophe Moreau	Road race	5:30:46	62
Richard Virenque	Road race	5:30:46	63
Laurent Jalabert	Time trial	58:44	5
Christophe Moreau	Time trial	59:37	13

Women

Athlete	Event	Time	Rank
Jeannie Longo-Ciprelli	Road race	3:06:37	26
Magali le Floc'h	Road race	3:06:31	6
Catherine Marsal	Road race	3:11:04	39
Jeannie Longo-Ciprelli	Time trial	42:52	3rd place, bronze medalist(s)
Catherine Marsal	Time trial	44:27	13

=== Track Cycling ===
Sprint

Athlete	Event	Qualification		Round 1	Repechage 1	Round 2	Repechage 2	Quarterfinals	Semifinals	Final	
Athlete	Event	Time Speed (km/h)	Rank	Opposition Time Speed (km/h)	Opposition Time Speed (km/h)	Opposition Time Speed (km/h)	Opposition Time Speed (km/h)	Opposition Time Speed (km/h)	Opposition Time Speed (km/h)	Opposition Time Speed (km/h)	Rank
Laurent Gané	Men's sprint	10.243; 70.292 km/h	2 Q	Herrera (CUB); W 11.054; 65.135 km/h	—N/a	MacLean (GBR); W 11.049; 65.164 km/h	—N/a	Eadie (AUS); W 10.648; 10.833	Rousseau (FRA); L 10.822	Fiedler (GER); L	4
Florian Rousseau	Men's sprint	10.277; 70.059 km/h	3 Q	Angelidis (GRE); W 10.865; 66.268 km/h	—N/a	Arrue (USA); W 10.906; 66.019 km/h	—N/a	Villanueva (ESP); W 10.744; 10.781	Gané (FRA); W 10.877; 11.536	Nothstein (USA); L	2nd place, silver medalist(s)
Felicia Ballanger	Women's sprint	11.262; 63.932 km/h	1 Q	Kasslin (FIN); W 12.257; 58.742 km/h	—N/a			Lindenmuth (USA); W 11.772; 12.060	Ferris (AUS); W 12.328; 12.124	Grichina (RUS); W 12.810; 12.533	1st place, gold medalist(s)
Laurent Gané; Florian Rousseau; Arnaud Tournant	Team sprint	44.425; 60.777 km/h	1 Q	Germany; W 44.302; 60.945 km/h	1 Q	—N/a				Great Britain; W 44.233; 61.040 km/h	1st place, gold medalist(s)

Pursuit

Athlete	Event	Qualification		Quarterfinals		Semifinals		Final	
Athlete	Event	Time	Rank	Opponent Results	Rank	Opponent Results	Rank	Opponent Results	Rank
Philippe Gaumont	Men's pursuit	4:22.142	5	Did not advance					
Marion Clignet	Women's pursuit	3:34.636	2 Q	—N/a		McGregor (GBR); W 3:36.244	2 Q	Zijlaard (NED); L 3:38.751	2nd place, silver medalist(s)
Cyril Bos; Philippe Ermenault; Francis Moreau; Jerome Neuville	Team pursuit	4:05.155	3 q	New Zealand; W 4:05.224	3 Q	Germany; L 4:11.549	4 q	Great Britain; L 4:05.991	4

Time trial

Athlete	Event	Time	Rank
Arnaud Tournant	Men's time trial	1:03.023	5
Felicia Ballanger	Women's time trial	34.140 OR	1st place, gold medalist(s)
Magali Faure-Humbert	Women's time trial	35.766	11

Points race

Keirin

Athlete	Event	1st round	Repechage	2nd round	Final
Athlete	Event	Rank	Rank	Rank	Rank
Frédéric Magné	Keirin	2 Q	—N/a	3 Q	6
Florian Rousseau	Keirin	5 R	2 Q	3 Q	1st place, gold medalist(s)

Omnium

Athlete	Event	Points	Laps	Rank
Christophe Capelle	Men's points race	2	0	19
Marion Clignet	Women's points race	11	0	6
Christophe Capelle; Robert Sassone	Madison	5	0	10

== Diving ==
France entered nine diving events and had two top 10 finishes.

Men

Athlete	Event	Preliminaries		Semifinals				Final		
Athlete	Event	Points	Rank	Points	Rank	Total	Rank	Points	Total	Rank
Frédéric Pierre	Men's 3m springboard	310.74	40	Did not advance						
Gilles Emptoz-Lacote	Men's 10m platform	377.70	20	Did not advance						
Gilles Emptiz-Lacote; Frédéric Pierre	Men's synchronized 3m springboard	—N/a							310.08	6
Gilles Emptiz-Lacote; Frédéric Pierre	Men's synchronized 10m platform	—N/a							314.94	8

Women

Athlete	Event	Preliminaries		Semifinals				Final		
Athlete	Event	Points	Rank	Points	Rank	Total	Rank	Points	Total	Rank
Julie Danaux	Women's 3m springboard	219.87	36	Did not advance						
Sandra Ponthus	Women's 3m springboard	242.79	23	Did not advance						
Odile Arboles-Souchon	Women's 10m platform	260.25	23	Did not advance						
Claire Febvay	Women's 10m platform	222.81	35	Did not advance						
Odile Arboles-Souchon; Julie Danaux	Women's synchronized 10m platform	—N/a							277.14	7

== Equestrian ==
=== Eventing ===
Athlete	Horse	Event	Dressage		Cross-country		Jumping		Total	
Athlete	Horse	Event	Penalties	Rank	Penalties	Rank	Penalties	Rank	Penalties	Rank
Jean-Lou Bigot	Twist La Beige	Individual	56.4	29	0	1	10.0	13	64.6	12
Rodolphe Scherer	Bambi De Brier	Individual	41.4	8	0	1	5.0	7	46.4	4
Nicolas Touzaint	Cobra D'Or	Individual	50.6	19	Did not advance					
Jean-Lou Bigot; Jean-Luc Force; Jean Teulère; Didier Willefert	Twist La Beige; Crocus Jacob; Amouncha; Blakring	Team	140.2	4	87.6	8	WD; WD; RT; RT	-	3000.0	10

=== Jumping ===
Athlete	Horse	Event	Qualification								Final					Total	
Athlete	Horse	Event	Round 1		Round 2			Round 3			Round A		Round B			Total	
Athlete	Horse	Event	Penalties	Rank	Penalties	Total	Rank	Penalties	Total	Rank	Penalties	Rank	Penalties	Total	Rank	Total	Rank
Patrice Deleveau	Caucalis	Individual	23.50	62	12.00	35.50	61	EL	96.00	68	Did not advance						
Alexandra Ledermann	Rocket M	Individual	8.00	21	0.00	8.00	5	0.00	8.00	2 Q	8.00	14 Q	RT	36.00	28	36.00	28
Thierry Pomel	Thor Des Chain	Individual	8.50	23	4.00	12.50	13	4.00	16.50	13 Q	8.00	14 Q	RT	36.00	28	36.00	28
Philippe Rozier	Barbarian	Individual	5.00	11	4.00	9.00	11	16.00	21.00	21	Did not advance						
Patrice Deleveau; Alexandra Ledermann; Thierry Pomel; Philippe Rozier	Caucalis; Rochet M Thor Des Chain; Barbarian	Team	8.00	1	16.00	24.00	4	—N/a								24.00	4

== Fencing ==
Sixteen fencers, eleven men and five women, represented France in 2000.

Men

Athlete	Event	Round of 64	Round of 32	Round of 16	Quarterfinal	Semifinal	Final / BM	
Athlete	Event	Opposition Score	Opposition Score	Opposition Score	Opposition Score	Opposition Score	Opposition Score	Rank
Jean-François Di Martino	Men's épée	Bye	Obry (FRA); L 12-15	Did not advance				
Hugues Obry	Men's épée	Bye	Di Martino (FRA); W 15-12	Adams (AUS); W 15-5	Vánky (SWE); W 15-12	Fischer (SUI); W 15-13	Kolobkov (RUS); L 12-15	2nd place, silver medalist(s)
Éric Srecki	Men's épée	Bye	Marik (AUT); W 15-10	Horbachuk (UKR); W 15-11	Lee S-G (KOR); L 14-15	Did not advance		
Jean-Noël Ferrari	Men's foil	Bye	Plumenail (FRA); W 15-8	Tucker (CUB); W 15-13	Breutner (GER); W 15-9	Bißdorf (GER); L 7-15	Shevchenko (RUS); L 14-15	4
Brice Guyart	Men's foil	Marchetti (ARG); W 15-6	Kim Y-H (KOR); L 13-15	Did not advance				
Lionel Plumenail	Men's foil	Tahoun (EGY); W 15-9	Ferrari (FRA); L 8-15	Did not advance				
Mathieu Gourdain	Men's sabre	Bye	Medina (ESP); W 15-14	Pozdnyakov (RUS); W 15-11	Găureanu (ROU); W 15-14	Ferjancsik (HUN); W 15-12	Covaliu (ROU); L 12-15	2nd place, silver medalist(s)
Julien Pillet	Men's sabre	Bye	Falcon (ESP); W 15-12	Găureanu (ROU); L 10-15	Did not advance			
Damien Touya	Men's sabre	Bye	Smart (USA); W 15-8	Bauer (GER); W 15-12	Covaliu (ROU); L 12-15	Did not advance		
Jean-François di Martino; Hugues Obry; Éric Srecki	Men's team épée	—N/a			Hungary; W 43-42	Cuba; W 45-36	Italy; L 38-39	2nd place, silver medalist(s)
Jean-Noel Ferrari; Brice Guyart; Patrice Lhotellier; Lionel Plumenail	Men's team foil	—N/a			Cuba; W 45-43	Poland; W 45-38	China; W 45-44	1st place, gold medalist(s)
Mathieu Gourdain; Julien Pillet; Cédric Séguin; Damien Touya	Men's team sabre	—N/a			Ukraine; W 45-31	Germany; W 45-44	Russia; L 32-45	2nd place, silver medalist(s)

Women

Athlete	Event	Round of 64	Round of 32	Round of 16	Quarterfinal	Semifinal	Final / BM	
Athlete	Event	Opposition Score	Opposition Score	Opposition Score	Opposition Score	Opposition Score	Opposition Score	Rank
Valérie Barlois-Mevel-Leroux	Women's épée	Bye	Nass (GER); W 15-12	Tripathi (FRA); W 15-8	Logunova (RUS); L 10-15	Did not advance		
Laura Flessel-Colovic	Women's épée	Bye	Savić-Šotra (YUG); W 15-9	Rentmeister (AUT); W 15-12	Zalaffi (ITA); W 15-11	Nagy (HUN); L 14-15	Logunova (RUS); W 15-6	3rd place, bronze medalist(s)
Sangita Tripathi	Women's épée	Bye	Schalm-MacKay (CAN); W 15-13	Barlois-Mevel-Leroux (FRA); L 8-15	Did not advance			
Adeline Wuillème	Women's foil	Bye	Ohayon (ISR); L 12-15	Did not advance				
Valerie Barlois-Mevel-Leroux; Laura Flessel-Colovic; Sophie Moressée-Pichot; Sangita Tripathi	Women's team épée	—N/a			China; L 42-45	Did not advance		

== Gymnastics ==
=== Men ===
Team

Athlete	Event	Qualification								Final							
Athlete	Event	Apparatus						Total	Rank	Apparatus						Total	Rank
Athlete	Event	F	PH	R	V	PB	HB	Total	Rank	F	PH	R	V	PB	HB	Total	Rank
Eric Casimir	Team	—N/a	9.725	—N/a		9.425	9.687	28.837	84	Did not advance							
Yann Cucherat	Team	8.512	9.550	9.537	9.312	9.712 Q	9.700	56.323	23 Q	Did not advance							
Dimitri Karbanenko	Team	9.600	9.050	9.300	9.275	9.537	9.662	56.424	21 Q	Did not advance							
Florent Marée	Team	8.550	—N/a	9.162	9.050	9.650	7.675	44.087	63	Did not advance							
Eric Poujade	Team	—N/a	9.787 Q	—N/a				9.787	93	Did not advance							
Benjamin Varonian	Team	9.287	9.100	9.525	8.987	9.525	9.737 Q	56.161	27 Q	Did not advance							
Total	Team	38.574	38.474	38.249	38.261	38.312	38.149	225.469	10	Did not advance							

Individual events

Athlete	Event	Apparatus						Total	Rank
Athlete	Event	F	PH	R	V	PB	HB	Total	Rank
Yann Cucherat	All-around	9.262	9.662	9.575	9.212	9.612	9.600	56.923	15
Dimitri Karbanenko	All-around	9.450	9.125	9.425	9.612	9.712	9.637	56.961	15
Benjamin Varonian	All-around	9.500	8.887	9.550	8.987	9.725	9.712	56.361	20
Yann Cucherat	Parallel bars	—N/a				9.725	—N/a	9.725	6
Eric Poujade	Pommel horse	—N/a	9.825	—N/a				9.825	2nd place, silver medalist(s)
Benjamin Varonian	Horizontal bar	—N/a					9.787	9.787	2nd place, silver medalist(s)

=== Women ===
Team

Athlete	Event	Qualification						Final					
Athlete	Event	Apparatus				Total	Rank	Apparatus				Total	Rank
Athlete	Event	V	UB	BB	F	Total	Rank	V	UB	BB	F	Total	Rank
Anne-Sophie Endeler	Team	9.143	—N/a	9.375	9.587	28.105	69	Did not advance					
Ludivine Furnon	Team	—N/a	9.525	—N/a		9.525	94	Did not advance					
Nelly Ramassamy	Team	9.212	9.212	9.550	9.050	37.024	35 Q	Did not advance					
Delphine Regease	Team	9.150	9.212	9.625	9.562	37.549	24 Q	Did not advance					
Alexandra Soler	Team	9.318	9.475	9.375	9.050	37.218	30 Q	Did not advance					
Elvire Teza	Team	8.950	9.700 Q	9.550	8.762	36.962	37	Did not advance					
Total	Team	36.823	37.912	38.100	37.249	150.084	8	Did not advance					

Individual events

Athlete	Event	Apparatus				Total	Rank
Athlete	Event	V	UB	BB	F	Total	Rank
Nelly Ramassamy	All-around	9.243	9.137	9.112	9.100	36.592	29
Delphine Regease	All-around	9.087	9.225	9.575	9.162	37.049	24
Alexandra Soler	All-around	9.299	9.487	8.350	9.362	36.498	30
Elvire Teza	Uneven bars	—N/a	9.512	—N/a		9.512	8

== Handball ==
Men's roster

- Andrej Golic
- Bertrand Gille
- Bruno Martini
- Cédric Burdet
- Christian Gaudin
- Didier Dinart
- Grégory Anquetil
- Guéric Kervadec
- Guillaume Gille
- Jackson Richardson
- Jérôme Fernandez
- Marc Wiltberger
- Olivier Girault
- Patrick Cazal
- Stéphane Joulin

Women's roster

- Christelle Joseph-Mathieu
- Sonia Cendier Ajaguin
- Isabelle Wendling
- Joanne Dudziak
- Laïsa Lerus
- Leïla Lejeune-Duchemann
- Myriam Korfanty
- Nathalie Selambarom
- Nodjialem Myaro
- Raphaëlle Tervel
- Sandrine Delerce
- Stéphanie Cano
- Stéphanie Ludwig
- Valérie Nicolas
- Véronique Pecqueux-Rolland

Teams' results

Team	Event	Group stage						Quarterfinal	Semifinal	Final / BM	
Team	Event	Opposition Score	Opposition Score	Opposition Score	Opposition Score	Opposition Score	Rank	Opposition Score	Opposition Score	Opposition Score	Rank
France men's	Men's tournament	Slovenia; D 24-24	Tunisia; W 20-17	Spain; W 25-23	Sweden; L 23-24	Australia; W 28-16	2 Q	FR Yugoslavia; L 21-26	5-8th place Slovenia; W 29-22	5/6th place Germany; L 22-25	6
France women's	Women's tournament	South Korea; L 18-25	Hungary; L 22-23	Angola; W 29-27	Romania; W 21-18	—N/a	3 Q	Denmark; L 26-28	5-8th place Brazil; W 32-23	5/6th place Austria; L 32-33	6

== Judo ==
=== Men's Competition ===
Athlete	Event	First round	Round of 32	Round of 16	Quarterfinals	Semifinals	Repechage 1	Repechage 2	Repechage 3	Final / BM	
Athlete	Event	Opposition Result	Opposition Result	Opposition Result	Opposition Result	Opposition Result	Opposition Result	Opposition Result	Opposition Result	Opposition Result	Rank
Éric Despezelle	60kg	—N/a	Chorfi (MAR); W 0200–0000	Kurdghelashvili (MDA); L 0000–0010	Did not advance						
Larbi Benboudaoud	66kg	Han J-H (KOR); W 1010-0000	Quintanal (GUA); W 1000-0000	Somerville (GBR); W 0040S-0001C	Uematsu (ESP); W 1010-0000	Giovinazzo (ITA); W 1000-0000	—N/a			Özkan (TUR); L 0002-1000S	2nd place, silver medalist(s)
Ferrid Kheder	73kg	—N/a	Laryukhov (BLR); L 0010H-1000C	—N/a			Velazco (PER); W 0010S-0001S	Bilodid (UKR); W 1011C-0110S	Zeļonijs (LAT); L 0100K-1110K	Did not advance	
Djamel Bouras	81kg	—N/a	Arens (NED); W 1001S-0001S	Arteage (CUB); W 1001S-0001S	Kwak OC (PRK); W 1000-0001	Takimoto (JPN); L 0001-0100S	—N/a			Bronze medal match Budõlin (EST); L 0010C-0013C	5
Frédéric Demontfaucon	90kg	—N/a	Mashurenko (UKR); W 0110C-0010K	C Santiago (PUR); W 0020S-0001C	E Costa (ARG); W 1000-0000	Homorato (BRA); L 0001S-0131S	—N/a			Bronze medal match Salimov (AZE); W 1002-0000S	3rd place, bronze medalist(s)
Stéphane Traineau	100kg	—N/a	Stepkine (RUS); W 1011-0000	Belgroun (ALG); W 0200-0000	Hand (USA); W 1001-0000S	Gill (CAN); L 0010S-0012C	—N/a			Bronze medal match Ze'evi (ISR); W 1000-0000	3rd place, bronze medalist(s)
David Douillet	+ 100kg	—N/a	Cardozo (VEN); W	Tataroğlu (TUR); W 1010S-0001C	Van Barneveld (BEL); W 1000C-0010H	Pertelson (EST); W 1001-0000S	—N/a			Shinohara (JPN); W 0020C-0010	1st place, gold medalist(s)

=== Women's Competition ===
Athlete	Event	Round of 32	Round of 16	Quarterfinals	Semifinals	Repechage 1	Repechage 2	Repechage 3	Final / BM	
Athlete	Event	Opposition Result	Opposition Result	Opposition Result	Opposition Result	Opposition Result	Opposition Result	Opposition Result	Opposition Result	Rank
Sarah Nichollo-Rosso	-48kg	Cha H-H (PRK); L 0000-1000	—N/a				Atayeva (TKM); W 1000–0000	Zhao S (CHN); L 0100-1000	Did not advance	
Laetitia Tignola	-52kg	Essenge Abollo (CMR); W 1000-0000	Sullivan (AUS); L 0010C-0010C	Did not advance						
Barbara Harel	-57kg	Pace (MLT); W 0000-1000	D González (CUB); L 0000-1000	—N/a			Lomba (BEL); W 1001C-0110S	Cavazzuti (ITA); L 0001S-0011S	Did not advance	
Séverine Vandenhende	-63kg	Jung S-S (KOR); W 1001S-0011S	Roberge (CAN); W 1001S-0001S	Schutz (USA); W 1011-0000	von Rekowski (GER); W 0201-0000	—N/a			Li S (CHN); W 0010S-0001C	1st place, gold medalist(s)
Karine Rambault	-70kg	Wansart (GER); L 0000-1010	Did not advance							
Céline Lebrun	-78kg	Bye	San Miguel (ESP); W 1000-0000	Lee S-y (KOR); W 0000-0000	Luna (CUB); W 0000-0000	—N/a			Tang L (CHN); L 0010-0010C	2nd place, silver medalist(s)
Christine Cicot	+78kg	Bye	Bryant (GBR); W 0010S-0002C	Köppen (GER); L 0001S-1001S	—N/a		Hefny (EGY); W 0200-0000K	P Marques (BRA); W 0111S-0001C	Yamashita (JPN); L 0001S-1001S	4

== Modern pentathlon ==
Athlete	Event	Shooting (10 m air pistol)			Fencing (épée one touch)			Swimming (200 m freestyle)			Riding (show jumping)			Running (3000 m)			Total points	Final rank
Athlete	Event	Points	Rank	MP points	Results	Rank	MP points	Time	Rank	MP points	Penalties	Rank	MP points	Time	Rank	MP points	Total points	Final rank
Olivier Clergeau	Men's	180	7	1096	16	1	1000	2:13.71	20	1163	60	5	1040	10:20.71	21	918	5217	8
Sebastien Deleigne	Men's	176	14	1048	13	5	880	2:11.08	17	1190	90	6	1010	9:10.69	1	1198	5326	4
Caroline Delemer	Women's	161	22	868	15	1	950	2:26.40	13	1136	120	11	980	11:05.62	9	1058	4992	10

== Rhythmic gymnastics ==
Individual

Athlete	Event	Qualification						Final					
Athlete	Event	Rope	Hoop	Ball	Ribbon	Total	Rank	Rope	Hoop	Ball	Ribbon	Total	Rank
Eva Serrano	Individual	9.875	9.875	9.833	9.900	39.483	4 Q	9.841	9.850	9.841	9.858	39.390	5

Team

Athlete	Event	Qualification				Final			
Athlete	Event	Clubs	Ribbon & Hoops	Total	Rank	Clubs	Ribbon & Hoops	Total	Rank
Anne-Sophie Doyen; Anne-Laure Klein; Anne-Sophie Lavoine; Laetitia Mancieri; Magalie Poisson; Vanessa Sauzede	Group	19.050	18.850	37.900	9	Did not advance			

== Rowing ==
=== Men ===
Athlete	Event	Heats		Repechage		Semifinals		Final	
Athlete	Event	Time	Rank	Time	Rank	Time	Rank	Time	Rank
Michel Andrieux; Jean-Christophe Rolland	Men's coxless pair	6:44.80	4 Q	—N/a		6:30.96	1 FA	6:32.97	1st place, gold medalist(s)
Adrien Hardy; Frédéric Kowal	Men's double sculls	6:32.69	5 R	6:31.28	4 SA/B	6:32.09	7 FB	6:20.72	7
Thibaud Chapelle; Pascal Touron	Men's lightweight double sculls	6:32.73	1 Q	—N/a		6:21.32	2 FA	6:24.85	3rd place, bronze medalist(s)
Antoine Béghin; Laurent Béghin; Gilles Bosquet; Daniel Fauché	Men's coxless four	6:08.57	6 Q	—N/a		6:07.77	7 FB	6:01.29	7
Samuel Barathay; Yvan Deslavière; Guillaume Jeannet; Sébastien Vieilledent	Men's quadruple sculls	5:54.85	8 Q	—N/a		5:54.68	8 FB	5:55.41	10
Jean-Christophe Bette; Xavier Dorfman; Yves Hocdé; Laurent Porchier	Men's lightweight coxless four	6:09.32	1 SA/B	—N/a		6:00.85	3 FA	6:01.68	1st place, gold medalist(s)

=== Women ===
Athlete	Event	Heats		Repechage		Semifinals		Final	
Athlete	Event	Time	Rank	Time	Rank	Time	Rank	Time	Rank
Sophie Balmary	Women's single sculls	7:45.12	9 R	7:51.87	6 SA/B	7:47.16	9 FB	7:34.23	9
Gaëlle Buniet; Céline Garcia	Women's double sculls	7:15.39	5 R	7:10.98	5 FB	—N/a		7:04.73	8
Christelle Fernandez-Schulte; Benedicte Luzuy	Women's lightweight double sculls	7:16.53	3 R	7:11.46	2 SA/B	7:09.32	8 FB	7:10.70	7

== Sailing ==
France competed in six of the Sailing events at the Sydney Olympics.

Individual events

Athlete	Event	Race											Net points	Final rank
Athlete	Event	1	2	3	4	5	6	7	8	9	10	11	Net points	Final rank
Alexandre Guyader	Men's Mistral	22	4	(28)	6	4	15	5	11	9	(26)	24	100	12
Xavier Rohart	Finn	11	11	4	3	1	9	6	(13)	(17)	5	5	55	5
Tanguy Cariou; Gildas Philippe	470	10	2	5	16	OCS (30)	(23)	2	22	17	18	19	111	14
Pierre Pennec; Yann Guichard	Tornado	4	8	(13)	2	5	3	3	(9)	4	6	8	43	4
Lise Vidal	Women's Mistral	7	6	9	(25)	3	DSQ (30)	10	8	21	6	5	75	9

Men's Soling

Athlete	Event	Qualification races						Total	Rank	Round Robin					Rank	Quarterfinals	Semifinals	Final / BM	Rank
Athlete	Event	1	2	3	4	5	6	Total	Rank	GER	SWE	DEN	UKR	GBR	Rank	Quarterfinals	Semifinals	Final / BM	Rank
Philippe Presti; Pascal Rambeau; Jean-Marie Dauris	Soling	9	13	11	9	3	7	39	9	L	L	L	W	W	4	Did not advance			

== Shooting ==
Men

Athlete	Event	Qualification		Final	
Athlete	Event	Points	Rank	Total	Rank
Jean-Pierre Amat	10m air rifle	588	18	Did not advance	
Jean-Pierre Amat	50m rifle 3 positions	1158	22	Did not advance	
Jean-Pierre Amat	50m rifle prone	591	30	Did not advance	
Franck Badiou	10m air rifle	586	31	Did not advance	
Stéphane Clamens	Trap	107	30	Did not advance	
Jean-François Dellac	Skeet	117	35	Did not advance	
Franck Dumoulin	10m air pistol	590 OR	1 Q	688.9 OR	1st place, gold medalist(s)
Franck Dumoulin	50m pistol	559	12	Did not advance	
Franck Durbesson	Skeet	122	9	Did not advance	
Stéphane Gagne	10m air pistol	581	5 Q	682.0	5
Stéphane Gagne	50m pistol	549	26	Did not advance	
Jean-Paul Gros	Double trap	131	14	Did not advance	
Philippe Joualin	50m rifle prone	596	8 Q	699.0	8
Christophe Vicard	Trap	115	8	Did not advance	

Women

Athlete	Event	Qualification		Final	
Athlete	Event	Points	Rank	Total	Rank
Valérie Bellenoue	10m air rifle	391	20	Did not advance	
Valérie Bellenoue	50m rifle 3 positions	575	17	Did not advance	
Delphine Racinet	Trap	67	4 Q	92	2nd place, silver medalist(s)

== Swimming ==
Men

Athlete	Event	Heat		Semifinal		Final	
Athlete	Event	Time	Rank	Time	Rank	Time	Rank
Romain Barnier	50m freestyle	DNS		Did not advance			
Romain Barnier	100m freestyle	50.32	22	Did not advance			
Nicolas Rostoucher	400m freestyle	3:51.80	12	Did not advance			
Nicolas Rostoucher	1500m freestyle	15:13.26	11	Did not advance			
Simon Dufour	100m backstroke	56.01	15 Q	55.79	12	Did not advance	
Simon Dufour	200m backstroke	2:01.09	17	Did not advance			
Hugues Duboscq	100m breaststroke	1:02.40	14 Q	1:02.89	16	Did not advance	
Yohann Bernard	200m breaststroke	2:15.35	12 Q	2:13.48	5 Q	2:13.31	7
Stéphan Perrot	200m breaststroke	2:14.79	6 Q	2:14.59	12	Did not advance	
Franck Esposito	100m butterfly	53.54	11 Q	53.38	10	Did not advance	
Franck Esposito	200m butterfly	1:57.97	7 Q	1:57.04	5 Q	1:58.39	8
Xavier Marchand	200m individual medley	2:02.86	12 Q	2:01.81	8 Q	2:02.23	7
Johann Le Bihan	400m individual medley	4:20.96	14	Did not advance			
Romain Barnier; Frédérick Bousquet; Nicolas Kintz; Hugo Viart	4 × 100 m freestyle relay	3:20.19	8 Q	—N/a		3:21.00	7
Frédérick Bousquet; Hugues Duboscq; Simon Dufour; Franck Esposito	4 × 100 m medley relay	3:40.31	7 Q	—N/a		3:40.02	7

Women

Athlete	Event	Heat		Semifinal		Final	
Athlete	Event	Time	Rank	Time	Rank	Time	Rank
Solenne Figuès	200m freestyle	2:01.46	20	Did not advance			
Laetitia Choux	400m freestyle	4:13.09	14	Did not advance			
Roxana Mărăcineanu	100m backstroke	1:01.66	3 Q	1:01.61	5 Q	1:01.10	4
Roxana Mărăcineanu	200m backstroke	2:11.01	2 Q	2:11.93	3 Q	2:10.25	2nd place, silver medalist(s)
Karine Brémond	200m breaststroke	2:27.13	4 Q	2:27.86	9	Did not advance	
Cécile Jeanson	100m butterfly	59.96	17 Q	59.80	14	Did not advance	
Cécile Jeanson	200m butterfly	2:10.78	9 Q	2:10.78	13	Did not advance	
Alicia Bozon; Laetitia Choux; Solenne Figuès; Katarin Quelennec	4 × 200 m freestyle relay	8:07.03	6 Q	—N/a		8:05.99	8

== Synchronized swimming ==
Athlete	Event	Technical routine		Free routine (preliminary)			Free routine (final)		
Athlete	Event	Points	Rank	Points	Total (technical + free)	Rank	Points	Total (technical + free)	Rank
Virginie Dedieu; Myriam Lignot	Duet	33.997	3	63.094	97.091	3 Q	33.997	97.437	3rd place, bronze medalist(s)
Cinthia Bouhier; Virginie Dedieu; Charlotte Fabre; Myriam Glez; Rachel le Bozec; Myriam Lignot; Charlotte Massardier; Magali Rathier	Team	—N/a					33.763	96.467	4

== Table tennis ==
Singles

Athlete	Event	Group stage			Round of 32	Round of 16	Quarterfinals	Semifinals	Final / BM	
Athlete	Event	Opposition Result	Opposition Result	Rank	Opposition Result	Opposition Result	Opposition Result	Opposition Result	Opposition Result	Rank
Damien Eloi	Men's singles	Bye			Lee C-S (KOR); W 3-1	Liu Guol (CHN); L 2-3	Did not advance			
Jean-Philippe Gatien	Men's singles	Bye			Błaszczyk (POL); L 0-3	Did not advance				
Christophe Legout	Men's singles	Bye			Ryu (KOR); W 3-2	Samsonov (BLR); L 0-3	Did not advance			
Anne Boileau	Women's singles	Pavlovich (BLR); W 3-0	Ghatak (IND); W 3-0	1 Q	Steff (ROU); L 0-3	Did not advance				

Doubles

Athlete	Event	Group stage			Round of 16	Quarterfinals	Semifinals	Final / BM	
Athlete	Event	Opposition Result	Opposition Result	Rank	Opposition Result	Opposition Result	Opposition Result	Opposition Result	Rank
Damien Eloi; Christophe Legout	Men's doubles	Huang (CAN); K Liu (CAN); W 2-1	Liu S (ARG); Tabachnik (ARG); W 2-0	1 Q	Persson (SWE); Waldner (SWE); W 3-0	Wang L (CHN); Yan (CHN); L 0-3	Did not advance		
Patrick Chila; Jean-Philippe Gatien	Men's doubles	Bye			Håkansson (SWE); Karlsson (SWE); W 3-1	Jindrak (AUT); Schlager (AUT); W 3-2	Kong (CHN); Liu Guol (CHN); L 1-3	Lee C-S (KOR); Ryu (KOR); W 3-1	3rd place, bronze medalist(s)

== Taekwondo ==
Athlete	Event	Round of 16	Quarterfinals	Semifinals	Repechage 1	Repechage 2	Final / BM	
Athlete	Event	Opposition Result	Opposition Result	Opposition Result	Opposition Result	Opposition Result	Opposition Result	Rank
Pascal Gentil	Men's +80kg	Rashwan (EGY); W 4-1	Saenz (CUB); W KO	Kim K-h (KOR); L 2-6	—N/a	Daley (GBR); W 3-0	Al-Dosari (KSA); W KO	3rd place, bronze medalist(s)
Myriam Baverel	Women's +67kg	Lee W Y (MAS); W 8-4	Carmona (VEN); L 3-8	Did not advance				

== Tennis ==
=== Men's singles ===
Athlete	Event	Round of 64	Round of 32	Round of 16	Quarterfinals	Semifinals	Final / BM	
Athlete	Event	Opposition Score	Opposition Score	Opposition Score	Opposition Score	Opposition Score	Opposition Score	Rank
Arnaud Clément	Men's singles	Rusedski (GBR); W 6–2, 6–3	Correjta (ESP); L 7–6, 4–6, 4–6	Did not advance				
Arnaud Di Pasquale	Men's singles	Kiefer (GER); W 6–4, 6–3	Voltchkov (BLR); W 6–2, 6–2	Norman (SWE); W 7–6, 7–6	JC Ferrero (ESP); W 6–2, 6–1	Kafelnikov (RUS); L 4–6, 4–6	Bronze medal match Federer (SUI); W 7–6, 6–7, 6–3	3rd place, bronze medalist(s)
Nicolas Escudé	Men's singles	Chela (ARG); L 7–6, 5–7, 1–6	Did not advance					
Fabrice Santoro	Men's singles	Safin (RUS); W 1–6, 6–1, 6–4	Vicente (ESP); W 6–1, 6–7, 7–5	Alami (MAR); L 2–6, 7–5, 4–6	Did not advance			

=== Men's doubles ===
Athlete	Event	Round of 32	Round of 16	Quarterfinals	Semifinals	Final / BM	
Athlete	Event	Opposition Score	Opposition Score	Opposition Score	Opposition Score	Opposition Score	Rank
Arnaud Clément; Nicolas Escudé	Men's doubles	Vemić (YUG); Zimonjić (YUG); W 6–2, 6–2	Mirnyi (BLR); Voltchkov (BLR); L 4–6, 6–7	Did not advance			

=== Women's singles ===
Athlete	Event	Round of 64	Round of 32	Round of 16	Quarterfinals	Semifinals	Final / BM	
Athlete	Event	Opposition Score	Opposition Score	Opposition Score	Opposition Score	Opposition Score	Opposition Score	Rank
Nathalie Dechy	Women's singles	Serna (ESP); W 6–1, 6–2	Pratt (AUS); W 6–3, 6–1	Seles (USA); L 2–6, 3–6	Did not advance			
Julie Halard-Decugis	Women's singles	Garbin (ITA); W 6–4, 6–2	Bedáňová (CZE); W 6–3, 6–4	Schett (AUT); L 6–2, 2–6, 1–6	Did not advance			
Amélie Mauresmo	Women's singles	Zuluaga (COL); L 3–6, 6–3, 2–6	Did not advance					

=== Women's doubles ===
Athlete	Event	Round of 32	Round of 16	Quarterfinals	Semifinals	Final / BM	
Athlete	Event	Opposition Score	Opposition Score	Opposition Score	Opposition Score	Opposition Score	Rank
Julie Halard-Decugis; Amélie Mauresmo	Women's doubles	Bye	Tatarkova (UKR); Zaporozhanova (UKR); W 6–2, 6–4	S Williams (USA); V Williams (USA); L 3–6, 2–6	Did not advance		

== Trampolining ==
Athlete	Event	Final	
Athlete	Event	Score	Rank
David Martin	Men's	38.80	4

== Triathlon ==
France's competitors at the first Olympic triathlon included twins Beatrice Mouthon and Isabelle Mouthon-Michellys. Isabelle was one of the three French triathletes to place in the top eight.

Athlete	Event	Swim (1.5 km)	Bike (40 km)	Run (10 km)	Total Time	Rank
Stephan Bignet	Men's	18:01.59	59:36.10	33:34.46	1:51:12.15	31
Carl Blasco	Men's	18:06.19	59:18.21	32:53.62	1:50:18.02	19
Olivier Marceau	Men's	18:11.69	58:12.40	32:53.94	1:49:18.03	7
Christine Hocq	Women's	19:43.78	1:05:33.90	37:44.22	2:03:01.90	8
Beatrice Mouthon	Women's	21:15.48	1:09:03.90	40:48.70	2:11:08.08	35
Isabelle Mouthon-Michellys	Women's	19:48.98	1:05:28.50	37:35.93	2:02:53.41	7

== Weightlifting ==
Men

Athlete	Event	Snatch			Clean & jerk			Total	Rank
Athlete	Event	1	2	3	1	2	3	Total	Rank
Eric Bonnel	Bantamweight (– 56 kg)	112.5	~~117.5~~	~~117.5~~	140.0	~~147.5~~	~~147.5~~	252.5	14
Samson N'Dicka-Matam	Featherweight (– 62 kg)	125.0	~~130.0~~	~~130.0~~	160.0	~~165.0~~	~~165.0~~	285.0	12

Women

Athlete	Event	Snatch			Clean & jerk			Total	Rank
Athlete	Event	1	2	3	1	2	3	Total	Rank
Sabrina Richard	Flyweight (– 48 kg)	70.0	~~72.5~~	~~75.0~~	87.5	~~92.5~~	~~92.5~~	157.5	8

== Wrestling ==
Athlete	Event	Elimination Pool			Quarterfinal	Semifinal	Final / BM	
Athlete	Event	Opposition Result	Opposition Result	Rank	Opposition Result	Opposition Result	Opposition Result	Rank
Djamal Ainaoui	-58kg	Sheng (CHN); L 1-0	Stepanyan (UKR); W 7-6	2	Did not advance			
Ghani Yalouz	-69kg	Hirbik (HUN); W 5-4	Nikitin (EST); L 8-11	2	Did not advance			
Yvon Riemer	-76kg	Yli-Hannuksela (FIN); L 1-4	Baiseitov (KAZ); L 2-4	3	Did not advance			

== See also ==
- France at the 2000 Summer Paralympics

== Notes ==
- Wallechinsky, David (2004). The Complete Book of the Summer Olympics (Athens 2004 Edition). Toronto, Canada. ISBN 1-894963-32-6.
- International Olympic Committee (2001). The Results. Retrieved 12 November 2005.
- Sydney Organising Committee for the Olympic Games (2001). Official Report of the XXVII Olympiad Volume 1: Preparing for the Games. Retrieved 20 November 2005.
- Sydney Organising Committee for the Olympic Games (2001). Official Report of the XXVII Olympiad Volume 2: Celebrating the Games. Retrieved 20 November 2005.
- Sydney Organising Committee for the Olympic Games (2001). The Results. Retrieved 20 November 2005.
- International Olympic Committee Web Site
