= Estonia at the 2000 Summer Olympics =

- IOC code: EST
- NOC: Estonian Olympic Committee
- Website: www.eok.ee (in Estonian)

in Sydney
- Competitors: 33 (31 men and 2 women) in 11 sports
- Flag bearer: Tõnu Tõniste
- Medals Ranked 47th: Gold 1 Silver 0 Bronze 2 Total 3

Summer Olympics appearances (overview)
- 1920; 1924; 1928; 1932; 1936; 1948–1988; 1992; 1996; 2000; 2004; 2008; 2012; 2016; 2020; 2024

Other related appearances
- Russian Empire (1908–1912); Soviet Union (1952–1988)

Estonia competed at the 2000 Summer Olympics in Sydney, Australia. 33 competitors, 31 men and 2 women, took part in 29 events in 11 sports.

== Medalists ==
Medal	Name	Sport	Event
Gold	Erki Nool	Athletics	men's decathlon
Bronze	Aleksei Budõlin	Judo	men's middleweight (81 kg)
Bronze	Indrek Pertelson	Judo	men's heavyweight (+100 kg)

== Athletics ==
Men
Track & road events

Athlete	Event	Heat		Quarterfinal		Semifinal		Final	
Athlete	Event	Result	Rank	Result	Rank	Result	Rank	Result	Rank
Pavel Loskutov	Marathon	—						2:19:41	35

Field events

Athlete	Event	Qualification		Final	
Athlete	Event	Distance	Position	Distance	Position
Aleksander Tammert	Discus throw	63.52	9 Q	63.25	9
Andrus Värnik	Javelin throw	81.34	15	Did not advance	

Combined events – Decathlon

Athlete	Event	100 m	LJ	SP	HJ	400 m	110H	DT	PV	JT	1500 m	Final	Rank
Erki Nool	Result	10,68	7.76	15.11	2.00	46,71	14,48	43.66	5.00	65.82	4.29,48	8641	
Erki Nool	Points	933	1000	796	803	973	913	739	910	826	748	8641	
Indrek Kaseorg	Result	11,31	7.22	13.26	1.97	50,03	14,57	41.98	4.80	66.54	4.35,64	7932	17
Indrek Kaseorg	Points	793	866	683	776	813	902	705	849	837	708	7932	17

== Canoeing ==
=== Sprint ===
Men

Athlete	Event	Heats		Semifinals		Final	
Athlete	Event	Time	Rank	Time	Rank	Time	Rank
Hain Helde	K-1 500 m	1.42,772	7 Q	1.45,91	9	Did not advance	25
Hain Helde	K-1 1000 m	3.40,407	5 Q	3.43,499	7	Did not advance	18

== Cycling ==
=== Road ===
Athlete	Event	Time	Rank
Lauri Aus	Men's road race	DNF	
Lauri Aus	Men's time trial	1:02.16	32
Jaan Kirsipuu	Men's road race	5:30:46	18
Innar Mändoja	Men's road race	DNF	
Janek Tombak	Men's road race	DNF	
Erki Pütsep	Men's road race	5:30:46	55

== Fencing ==
Four fencers, all men, represented Estonia in 2000.

Men

Athlete	Event	Round of 64	Round of 32	Round of 16	Quarterfinal	Semifinal	Final / BM	
Athlete	Event	Opposition Score	Opposition Score	Opposition Score	Opposition Score	Opposition Score	Opposition Score	Rank
Kaido Kaaberma	Individual épée	BYE	Mauricio Rivas (COL); L 13–15	Did not advance				17
Andrus Kajak	Individual épée	BYE	Aleksandr Poddubny (KGZ); L 13–15	Did not advance				33
Meelis Loit	Individual épée	Wang Weixin (CHN); W 15–7	Pavel Kolobkov (RUS); L 9–15	Did not advance				30
Meelis Loit; Kaido Kaaberma; Nikolai Novosjolov; Andrus Kajak	Team épée	—		Hungary; L 42–45	Did not advance	BYE	9th place final Austria; W 45–44	9

== Judo ==
Men

Athlete	Event	Preliminary	Round of 32	Round of 16	Quarterfinals	Semifinals	Repechage 1	Repechage 2	Repechage 3	Final / BM	
Athlete	Event	Opposition Result	Opposition Result	Opposition Result	Opposition Result	Opposition Result	Opposition Result	Opposition Result	Opposition Result	Opposition Result	Rank
Aleksei Budõlin	−81 kg	BYE	Sergei Aschwanden (SUI); W 1000-0000	Krisztián Tölgyesi (HUN); W 0010-0000	Cho In-Chul (KOR); L 0000-0010	Did not advance	BYE	Florian Wanner (GER); W 1000-0000	Kazem Sarikhani (IRI); W 1000-0000	Djamel Bouras (FRA); W 0010-0000	Bronze
Indrek Pertelson	+100 kg	BYE	Steeve Nguema Ndong (GAB); W 1000-0000	Ernesto Pérez (ESP); W 1000-0000	Daniel Hernandes (BRA); W 1001-0001	David Douillet (FRA); L 0000-1000	BYE			Ruslan Sharapov (BLR); W 1000-0000	Bronze

== Modern pentathlon ==
Athlete	Event	Shooting (10 m air pistol)			Swimming (200 m freestyle)			Fencing (épée one touch)			Riding (show jumping)			Running (3000 m)			Total points	Final rank
Athlete	Event	Points	Rank	MP Points	Time	Rank	MP points	Wins	Rank	MP points	Penalties	Rank	MP points	Time	Rank	MP Points	Total points	Final rank
Imre Tiidemann	Men's	179	10	1084	2:18.05	23	1120	9	21	720	90	9	1010	9:23.85	5	1146	5080	14

== Rowing ==
Men

Athlete	Event	Heats		Repechage		Semifinals		Final	
Athlete	Event	Time	Rank	Time	Rank	Time	Rank	Time	Rank
Jüri Jaanson	Single sculls	7.06,58	3 R	7.05,16	1 Q	7:06.70	3 FA	6.59,15	6
Leonid Gulov; Andrei Šilin	Double Sculls	6.41,74	4 R	6.35,09	3 Q	6.38,75	5 FB	6.22,78	9

== Sailing ==
Estonia competed in three events in the Sailing competition of the Sydney Olympics. The highest they placed in any event was 22nd.

Men

Athlete	Event	Race											Net points	Final rank
Athlete	Event	1	2	3	4	5	6	7	8	9	10	M*	Net points	Final rank
Imre Taveter	Finn	22	22	19	17	~~23~~	22	~~26~~	23	9	21	17	172	22
Tõnu Tõniste; Toomas Tõniste	470	7	14	~~29~~	17	~~OCS~~	25	16	14	21	25	18	157	22

Open

Athlete	Event	Race											Net points	Final rank
Athlete	Event	1	2	3	4	5	6	7	8	9	10	M*	Net points	Final rank
Peter Saraskin	Laser	25	29	6	30	28	~~32~~	27	32	~~OCS~~	21	12	210	29

== Shooting ==
Men

Athlete	Event	Qualification		Final	
Athlete	Event	Score	Rank	Score	Rank
Andrei Inešin	Skeet	120	19	Did not advance	

== Swimming ==
Men

Athlete	Event	Heat		Semifinal		Final	
Athlete	Event	Time	Rank	Time	Rank	Time	Rank
Indrek Sei	50 metre freestyle	23,11	29	Did not advance			
Indrek Sei	100 metre freestyle	52,09	43	Did not advance			
Raiko Pachel	100 metre breaststroke	1.03,99	32	Did not advance			
Raiko Pachel	200 metre breaststroke	2.19,71	33	Did not advance			

Women

Athlete	Event	Heat		Semifinal		Final	
Athlete	Event	Time	Rank	Time	Rank	Time	Rank
Jana Kolukanova	50 metre freestyle	25,96 NR	1 Q	26,03	16	Did not advance	
Elina Partõka	100 metre freestyle	57,71 NR	29	Did not advance			
Elina Partõka	200 metre freestyle	2.05,90	33	Did not advance			

== Wrestling ==
Men's Greco-Roman

Athlete	Event	Elimination Pool				Quarterfinal	Semifinal	Final / BM	
Athlete	Event	Opposition Result	Opposition Result	Opposition Result	Rank	Opposition Result	Opposition Result	Opposition Result	Rank
Valeri Nikitin	−69 kg	Yalouz (FRA); W PA	Hirbik (HUN); W 4–3	—	1 Q	Duguchiyev (AZE); W 4–1	Ascuy (CUB); L 0–6	Glouchkov (RUS); L 0–5	4
Toomas Proovel	−85 kg	Vahtangadze (GEO); L 4–6	Sanatbajev (KGZ); L 4–2	—	3	Did not advance			9
Helger Hallik	−130 kg	Milian (CUB); L 0–3	Hailin (CHN); L 2–3	—	3	Did not advance			16

== Notes ==
- Wallechinsky, David (2004). The Complete Book of the Summer Olympics (Athens 2004 Edition). Toronto, Canada. ISBN 1-894963-32-6.
- International Olympic Committee (2001). The Results. Retrieved 12 November 2005.
- Sydney Organising Committee for the Olympic Games (2001). Official Report of the XXVII Olympiad Volume 1: Preparing for the Games. Retrieved 20 November 2005.
- Sydney Organising Committee for the Olympic Games (2001). Official Report of the XXVII Olympiad Volume 2: Celebrating the Games. Retrieved 20 November 2005.
- Sydney Organising Committee for the Olympic Games (2001). The Results. Retrieved 20 November 2005.
- International Olympic Committee Web Site
