= Estonia at the 1996 Summer Olympics =

- IOC code: EST
- NOC: Estonian Olympic Committee
- Website: www.eok.ee (in Estonian)

in Atlanta
- Competitors: 43 (35 men, 8 women) in 13 sports
- Flag bearer: Jüri Jaanson
- Medals: Gold 0 Silver 0 Bronze 0 Total 0

Summer Olympics appearances (overview)
- 1920; 1924; 1928; 1932; 1936; 1948–1988; 1992; 1996; 2000; 2004; 2008; 2012; 2016; 2020; 2024

Other related appearances
- Russian Empire (1908–1912); Soviet Union (1952–1988)

Estonia competed at the 1996 Summer Olympics in Atlanta, United States, its seventh appearance at the Games and second entry since the breakup of the Soviet Union. 43 competitors, 35 men and 8 women, took part in 36 events in 13 sports.

== Archery ==
Estonia sent the same archer to its second archery competition as it had sent to the first. Raul Kivilo lost his first match, but improved his ranking by 10 places from four years earlier.

| Athlete | Event | Ranking round | | Round of 64 | Round of 32 | Round of 16 | Quarterfinals | Semifinals | Final / BM | |
| Athlete | Event | Score | Seed | Opposition Score | Opposition Score | Opposition Score | Opposition Score | Opposition Score | Opposition Score | Rank |
|---|---|---|---|---|---|---|---|---|---|---|
| Raul Kivilo | Men's individual | 649 | 36 | Jose Anchondo (MEX) (51); W 158-157 | Did not advance | | | | | 42 |

== Athletics ==
Men
Track & road events

| Athlete | Event | Heat | | Quarterfinal | | Semifinal | | Final | |
| Athlete | Event | Result | Rank | Result | Rank | Result | Rank | Result | Rank |
|---|---|---|---|---|---|---|---|---|---|
| Pavel Loskutov | Marathon | —N/a | | | | | | 2:23.14 | 58 |

Field events

| Athlete | Event | Qualification | | Final | |
| Athlete | Event | Distance | Position | Distance | Position |
|---|---|---|---|---|---|
| Aleksander Tammert | Discus Throw | 59.04 | 25 | Did not advance | |
| Donald Sild | Javelin Throw | 72.54 | 30 | Did not advance | |
| Valeri Bukrejev | Pole vault | NM | | Did not advance | |
| Jüri Tamm | Hammer throw | 73.16 | 26 | Did not advance | |
| Marko Turban | High Jump | 2.24 | 22 | Did not advance | |

Combined events – Men's decathlon

| Athlete | Event | 100 m | LJ | SP | HJ | 400 m | 100H | DT | PV | JT | 1500 m | Final | Rank |
|---|---|---|---|---|---|---|---|---|---|---|---|---|---|
| Indrek Kaseorg | Result | 11.40 | 7.26 | 13.11 | 2.07 | 49.03 | 14.53 | 39.46 | NM | DNS | — | DNF | |
| Indrek Kaseorg | Points | | | | | | | | 0 | — | — | DNF | |
| Andrei Nazarov | Result | 11.04 | NM | DNS | — | — | — | — | — | — | — | DNF | |
| Andrei Nazarov | Points | | 0 | 0 | — | — | — | — | — | — | — | DNF | |
| Erki Nool | Result | 10.65 | 7.88 | 14.01 | 2.01 | 47.26 | 15.03 | 42.98 | 5.40 | 65.48 | 4:43.36 | 8543 | 6 |
| Erki Nool | Points | | | | | | | | | | | 8543 | 6 |

Women
Track & road events

| Athlete | Event | Heat | | Quarterfinal | | Semifinal | | Final | |
| Athlete | Event | Result | Rank | Result | Rank | Result | Rank | Result | Rank |
|---|---|---|---|---|---|---|---|---|---|
| Jane Salumäe | Marathon | —N/a | | | | | | DNF | |

Field events

| Athlete | Event | Qualification | | Final | |
| Athlete | Event | Distance | Position | Distance | Position |
|---|---|---|---|---|---|
| Virge Naeris | Long Jump | 6.26 | 27 | Did not advance | |
| Virge Naeris | Triple Jump | 14.00 | 15 | Did not advance | |
| Eha Rünne | Discus Throw | 58.24 | 26 | Did not advance | |

== Volleyball ==
=== Men's beach tournament ===
| Athlete | Event | Round 1 | Round 2 | Round 3 | Round 4 | Loser's Bracket Round 1 | Loser's Bracket Round 2 | Loser's Bracket Round 3 | Loser's Bracket Round 4 | Loser's Bracket Round 5 | Semifinals | Final / BM | |
| Athlete | Event | Opposition Score | Opposition Score | Opposition Score | Opposition Score | Opposition Score | Opposition Score | Opposition Score | Opposition Score | Opposition Score | Opposition Score | Opposition Score | Rank |
|---|---|---|---|---|---|---|---|---|---|---|---|---|---|
| Avo Keel; Kaido Kreen | Men's | Jodard – Penigaud (FRA); L 8–15 | Did not advance | | | Kvalheim – Maaseide (NOR); L 2–15 | Did not advance | | | | | | 17 |

== Canoeing ==
=== Sprint ===
Men

| Athlete | Event | Heats | | Repechages | | Semifinals | | Final | |
| Athlete | Event | Time | Rank | Time | Rank | Time | Rank | Time | Rank |
|---|---|---|---|---|---|---|---|---|---|
| Hain Helde | K-1 500 m | 1.47,31 | 7 R | 1.44,34 | 5 | Did not advance | | | 19 |
| Hain Helde | K-1 1000 m | 3.59,13 | 7 R | 4.08,37 | 5 QS | 3:47.237 | 6 | Did not advance | 13 |

== Cycling ==
=== Road ===
| Athlete | Event | Time | Rank |
|---|---|---|---|
| Lauri Aus | Men's road race | 4:56.55 | 36 |
| Jaan Kirsipuu | Men's road race | 4:56.54 | 24 |
| Raido Kodanipork | Men's road race | 4:57.02 | 96 |
| Andres Lauk | Men's road race | 4:56.56 | 49 |
| Lauri Resik | Men's road race | DNF | |

=== Track ===
Women's Sprint

| Athlete | Event | Qualifying round | | 1/8 final | 1/8 repechage | Quarter-finals | Classification 5-8 | Semi-finals | Finals | |
| Athlete | Event | Time | Rank | Opposition Time Speed (km/h) | Opposition Time Speed (km/h) | Opposition Time Speed (km/h) | Opposition Time Speed (km/h) | Opposition Time Speed (km/h) | Opposition Time Speed (km/h) | Rank |
|---|---|---|---|---|---|---|---|---|---|---|
| Erika Salumäe | Women's sprint | 11.566 | 9 | Haringa (NED); L 12.164 | Paraskevin-Young (USA); W 12.018 | Ballanger (FRA); L 11.831 | Grishina (RUS); Wang (CHN); Dubnicoff (CAN); L 12.416 | Did not advance | | 6 |

=== Mountain biking ===
| Athlete | Event | Time | Rank |
|---|---|---|---|
| Alges Maasikmets | Men's cross-country | DNF | |

== Fencing ==
Six fencers, three men and three women, represented Estonia in 1996.

Men

| Athlete | Event | Round of 64 | Round of 32 | Round of 16 | Quarterfinal | Semifinal | Final / BM | |
| Athlete | Event | Opposition Score | Opposition Score | Opposition Score | Opposition Score | Opposition Score | Opposition Score | Rank |
|---|---|---|---|---|---|---|---|---|
| Kaido Kaaberma | Individual épée | BYE | Gang Zhao (CHN); W 15–6 | Robert Leroux (FRA); W 15–14 | Ivan Trevejo Pérez (CUB); L 14–15 | Did not advance | | 7 |
| Andrus Kajak | Individual épée | BYE | Krisztián Kulcsár (HUN); W 15–14 | Sandro Cuomo (ITA); L 14–15 | Did not advance | | | 15 |
| Meelis Loit | Individual épée | César González Llorens (ESP); L 14–15 | Did not advance | | | | | 35 |
| Andrus Kajak; Meelis Loit; Kaido Kaaberma | Team épée | —N/a | | | Germany; L 39–45 | Classification semi-final United States; W 45–38 | 5th place final Hungary; W 45–39 | 5 |

Women

| Athlete | Event | Round of 64 | Round of 32 | Round of 16 | Quarterfinal | Semifinal | Final / BM | |
| Athlete | Event | Opposition Score | Opposition Score | Opposition Score | Opposition Score | Opposition Score | Opposition Score | Rank |
|---|---|---|---|---|---|---|---|---|
| Heidi Rohi | Individual épée | Sandra Kenel (SUI); W 15-14 | Katja Nass (GER); L 12-15 | Did not advance | | | | 22 |
| Oksana Yermakova | Individual épée | BYE | Eva Fjellerup (DEN); W 15-14 | Gyöngyi Szalay-Horváth (HUN); L 6–15 | Did not advance | | | 15 |
| Maarika Võsu | Individual épée | BYE | Leslie Marx (USA); L 13–15 | Did not advance | | | | 18 |
| Oksana Yermakova; Maarika Võsu; Heidi Rohi | Team épée | —N/a | | | Italy; L 38-45 | Classification semi-final United States; W 45–38 | 5th place final Cuba; W 45-30 | 5 |

== Judo ==
Men

| Athlete | Event | Preliminary | Round of 32 | Round of 16 | Quarterfinals | Semifinals | Repechage 1 | Repechage 2 | Repechage 3 | Final / BM | |
| Athlete | Event | Opposition Result | Opposition Result | Opposition Result | Opposition Result | Opposition Result | Opposition Result | Opposition Result | Opposition Result | Opposition Result | Rank |
|---|---|---|---|---|---|---|---|---|---|---|---|
| Indrek Pertelson | +95 kg | —N/a | Rafał Kubacki (POL); L 0000-1000 | Did not advance | | | | | | | 21 |

== Modern pentathlon ==
| Athlete | Event | Shooting (10 m air pistol) | | | Swimming (200 m freestyle) | | | Fencing (épée one touch) | | | Riding (show jumping) | | | Running (3000 m) | | | Total points | Final rank |
| Athlete | Event | Points | Rank | MP Points | Time | Rank | MP points | Wins | Rank | MP points | Penalties | Rank | MP points | Time | Rank | MP Points | Total points | Final rank |
|---|---|---|---|---|---|---|---|---|---|---|---|---|---|---|---|---|---|---|
| Imre Tiidemann | Men's | 184 | 2 | 1144 | 3:27.86 | 23 | 1212 | 16 | 14 | 820 | 150 | 17 | 950 | 12:39.040 | 3 | 1288 | 5414 | 7 |

== Rowing ==
Men

| Athlete | Event | Heats | | Repechage | | Semifinals | | Final | |
| Athlete | Event | Time | Rank | Time | Rank | Time | Rank | Time | Rank |
|---|---|---|---|---|---|---|---|---|---|
| Jüri Jaanson | Single sculls | 8.10,01 | 5 R | 8.15,25 | 4 Q | 7.28,89 | 3FC | 8.33,53 | 18 |

== Sailing ==
Estonia competed in three events in the Sailing competition of the Sydney Olympics.

Men

| Athlete | Event | Race | | | | | | | | | | | Net points | Final rank |
| Athlete | Event | 1 | 2 | 3 | 4 | 5 | 6 | 7 | 8 | 9 | 10 | M* | Net points | Final rank |
|---|---|---|---|---|---|---|---|---|---|---|---|---|---|---|
| Tõnu Tõniste; Toomas Tõniste | 470 | 7 | 16 | 8 | 3 | 19 | ~~PMS~~ | ~~30~~ | 3 | 6 | 15 | 19 | 96 | 10 |

Women

| Athlete | Event | Race | | | | | | | | | | | Net points | Final rank |
| Athlete | Event | 1 | 2 | 3 | 4 | 5 | 6 | 7 | 8 | 9 | 10 | M* | Net points | Final rank |
|---|---|---|---|---|---|---|---|---|---|---|---|---|---|---|
| Krista Kruuv | Europe | 22 | 25 | ~~26~~ | 23 | 23 | 20 | 23 | ~~26~~ | 17 | 22 | 22 | 197 | 24 |

Open

| Athlete | Event | Race | | | | | | | | | | | Net points | Final rank |
| Athlete | Event | 1 | 2 | 3 | 4 | 5 | 6 | 7 | 8 | 9 | 10 | M* | Net points | Final rank |
|---|---|---|---|---|---|---|---|---|---|---|---|---|---|---|
| Peter Šaraškin | Laser | 14 | 27 | 21 | 29 | ~~30~~ | ~~33~~ | 12 | 14 | 18 | 21 | 20 | 176 | 24 |

== Shooting ==
Men

| Athlete | Event | Qualification | | Final | |
| Athlete | Event | Score | Rank | Score | Rank |
|---|---|---|---|---|---|
| Andrei Inešin | Skeet | 121 | 7 | Did not advance | |
| Heikki Jaansalu | Trap | 115 | 45 | Did not advance | |

== Swimming ==
Men

| Athlete | Event | Heat | | Semifinal | | Final | |
| Athlete | Event | Time | Rank | Time | Rank | Time | Rank |
|---|---|---|---|---|---|---|---|
| Indrek Sei | 50 metre freestyle | 23.29 | 27 | Did not advance | | | |
| Indrek Sei | 100 metre freestyle | 51.19 | 32 | Did not advance | | | |

== Wrestling ==
Men's freestyle

| Athlete | Event | Round 1 | Round 2 | Round 3 | Round 4 | Round 5 | Round 6 | Final / BM | |
| Athlete | Event | Opposition Result | Opposition Result | Opposition Result | Opposition Result | Opposition Result | Opposition Result | Opposition Result | Rank |
|---|---|---|---|---|---|---|---|---|---|
| Küllo Kõiv | −68 kg | Félix Malal Diédhiou (SEN); W 10–0 | Zaza Zazirov (UKR); L 0–5 | Elshad Allahverdiyev (AZE); W 5–1 | Ahmad Al-Osta (SYR); W 4–1 | Yosmany Sánchez Larrudet (CUB); L 0–6 | BYE | Ahmad Al-Osta (SYR); W 7–2 | 7 |
| Arvi Aavik | −100 kg | Daniel Sanchez (PUR); W 8–0 | Konstantin Aleksandrov (KGZ); L 0–1 | Wilfredo Morales Suárez (CUB); L 1–3 | Did not advance | | | | 12 |

Men's Greco-Roman

| Athlete | Event | Round 1 | Round 2 | Round 3 | Round 4 | Round 5 | Round 6 | Final / BM | |
| Athlete | Event | Opposition Result | Opposition Result | Opposition Result | Opposition Result | Opposition Result | Opposition Result | Opposition Result | Rank |
|---|---|---|---|---|---|---|---|---|---|
| Valeri Nikitin | −68 kg | Ender Memet (ROU); L 0–3 | Tarieli Melelashvili (GEO); W 6–0 | Attila Repka (HUN); W 2–0 | Yasushi Miyake (JPN); W 6–0 | Aleksandr Tretyakov (RUS); L 0–4 | BYE | Liubal Colás Oris (CUB); L 1–6 | 8 |
| Helger Hallik | −130 kg | Yogi Johl (CAN); W 0–0 | Panagiotis Poikilidis (GRE); L 0–3 | Sergei Mureiko (MDA); L 0–4 | Did not advance | | | | 15 |

== Notes ==
- Watkins, Ginger T., ed. (1997). The Official Report of the Centennial Olympic Games, Volume III The Competition Results (PDF). Atlanta: Peachtree Publishers. ISBN 1-56145-150-9. Archived from the original (PDF) on 2007-09-27.
