= Murashko =

Murashko, Murashka or Muraška (Ukrainian: Мурашко; Belarusian: Мурашка; Lithuanian: Muraška) is a surname. Notable people with the surname include:

- Alexander Murashko (born 1971), Belarusian figure skater
- Andrey Murashko (born 1975), Belarusian fencer
- Mikhail Murashko (born 1967), Russian Minister of Health
- Mykola Murashko (1844–1909), Ukrainian painter
- Oleksandr Murashko (1875–1919), Ukrainian painter, nephew of Mykola
- Rolandas Muraška (born 1973), Lithuanian tennis player
