= Weixin =

Weixin may refer to:

- Weixin County (威信县), in Yunnan Province, China
- WeChat, called Weixin (微信) in Chinese, a mobile phone messaging service by Tencent
- Weixin, Shimen (维新镇), a town in Shimen County, Hunan Province, China
- Wang Weixin (王偉新), Chinese fencer
- Wei Xin (魏新), Chinese football player
