= Gerry Adams (disambiguation) =

Gerry Adams (born 1948) is an Irish Republican politician.

Gerry Adams may also refer to:

- Gerry Adams Sr. (1926–2003), father of the Irish politician
- Gerry Adams (fencer) (born 1962), Australian fencer

== See also ==
- Jerry Adams (born 1940), Australian-American biologist
