= David Nathan =

David Nathan may refer to:

- David Nathan (journalist) (1926–2001), British journalist
- David Nathan (music writer) (born 1948), British music writer specialising in soul music
- David G. Nathan (born 1929), American pediatrician and hematologist
- David L. Nathan (born 1968), American psychiatrist, writer, and founder of Doctors for Cannabis Regulation
- David Nathan (merchant) (1816–1886), early colonial shopkeeper and businessman in New Zealand
- David Nathan (fencer) (born 1965), Australian fencer
- David Nathan (politician) (born 1972), American politician and businessman
- R. Raghu, Indian filmmaker who changed his name to David Nathan in 2015.
