= Men's team épée at the 2013 World Fencing Championships =

The Men's team épée event of the 2013 World Fencing Championships was held on August 11, 2013.

== Medalists ==
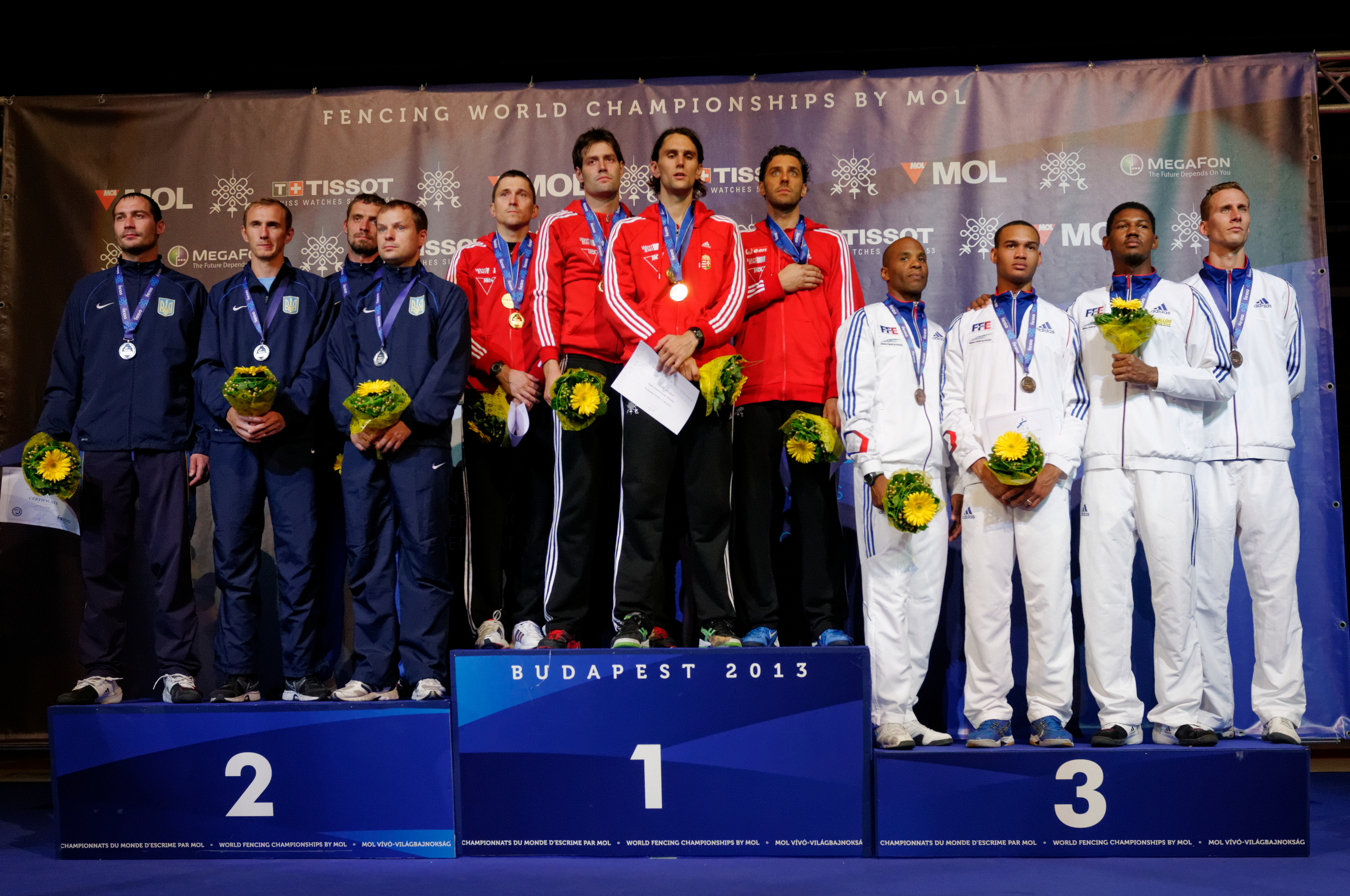
On the podium: Ukraine, Hungary, and France

Gold	Hungary; Géza Imre; Gábor Boczkó; András Rédli; Péter Szényi
Silver	Ukraine; Anatoliy Herey; Dmytro Karyuchenko; Vitalii Medvediev; Bohdan Nikishyn
Bronze	France; Alexandre Blaszyck; Daniel Jerent; Ulrich Robeiri; Iván Trevejo

== Draw ==
=== Finals ===
Quarter-finals
16	Czech Republic	27
9	Ukraine	33
5	France	45
4	Italy	40
3	Hungary	43
6	Venezuela	39
10	Poland	33
18	Israel	24

Semi-finals
9	Ukraine	17
5	France	15
3	Hungary	45
10	Poland	41

Finals
9	Ukraine	38
3	Hungary	42
Third place
5	France	45
10	Poland	35

=== Top half ===
==== Section 1 ====
Round of 64
Colombia	40
Singapore	37
Turkmenistan	20
Iran	45
Mexico	45
Serbia	29

Round of 32
Switzerland	45
Colombia	21
South Korea	35
Czech Republic	45
Ukraine	45
Iran	29
Mexico	27
Russia	45

Round of 16
Switzerland	31
Czech Republic	45
Ukraine	41
Russia	40

Quarterfinals
Czech Republic	27
Ukraine	33

==== Section 2 ====
Round of 64
Greece	33
Uzbekistan	45
Japan	45
Slovenia	40

Round of 32
France	45
Uzbekistan	30
Romania	29
Germany	25
Norway	32
Kyrgyzstan	45
Japan	34
Italy	45

Round of 16
France	45
Romania	32
Kyrgyzstan	38
Italy	45

Quarterfinals
France	45
Italy	40

=== Bottom half ===
==== Section 3 ====
Round of 64
Mongolia	22
Australia	45
Finland	pen.
DR Congo

Round of 32
Hungary	45
Australia	31
Hong Kong	30
Kazakhstan	45
Estonia	44
Egypt	45
Finland	38
Venezuela	45

Round of 16
Hungary	45
Kazakhstan	31
Egypt	32
Venezuela	45

Quarterfinals
Hungary	43
Venezuela	39

==== Section 4 ====
Round of 64
Slovakia	45
Morocco	41
Brazil	43
Denmark	45

Round of 32
China	45
Slovakia	39
Spain	38
Poland	41
Canada	35
Israel	45
Denmark	36
United States	45

Round of 16
China	29
Poland	45
Israel	45
United States	44

Quarterfinals
Poland	33
Israel	24

=== Placement rounds ===
==== 5–8th place ====
5–8th place semifinals
Czech Republic	45
Italy	43
Venezuela	45
Israel	29

5th place
Czech Republic	35
Venezuela	45
7th place
Italy	38
Israel	37

==== 9–16th place ====
9–16th place quarterfinals
Switzerland	42
Russia	41
Romania	36
Kyrgyzstan	35
Kazakhstan	45
Egypt	40
China	32
United States	45

9–13th place semifinals
Switzerland	30
Romania	15
Kazakhstan	39
United States	45

9th place
Switzerland	45
United States	35
11th place
Romania	30
Kazakhstan	29

==== 13–16th place ====
13–16th place semifinals
Russia	45
Kyrgyzstan	35
Egypt	33
China	32

13th place
Russia	45
Egypt	33
15th place
Kyrgyzstan	36
China	45

== Final classification ==
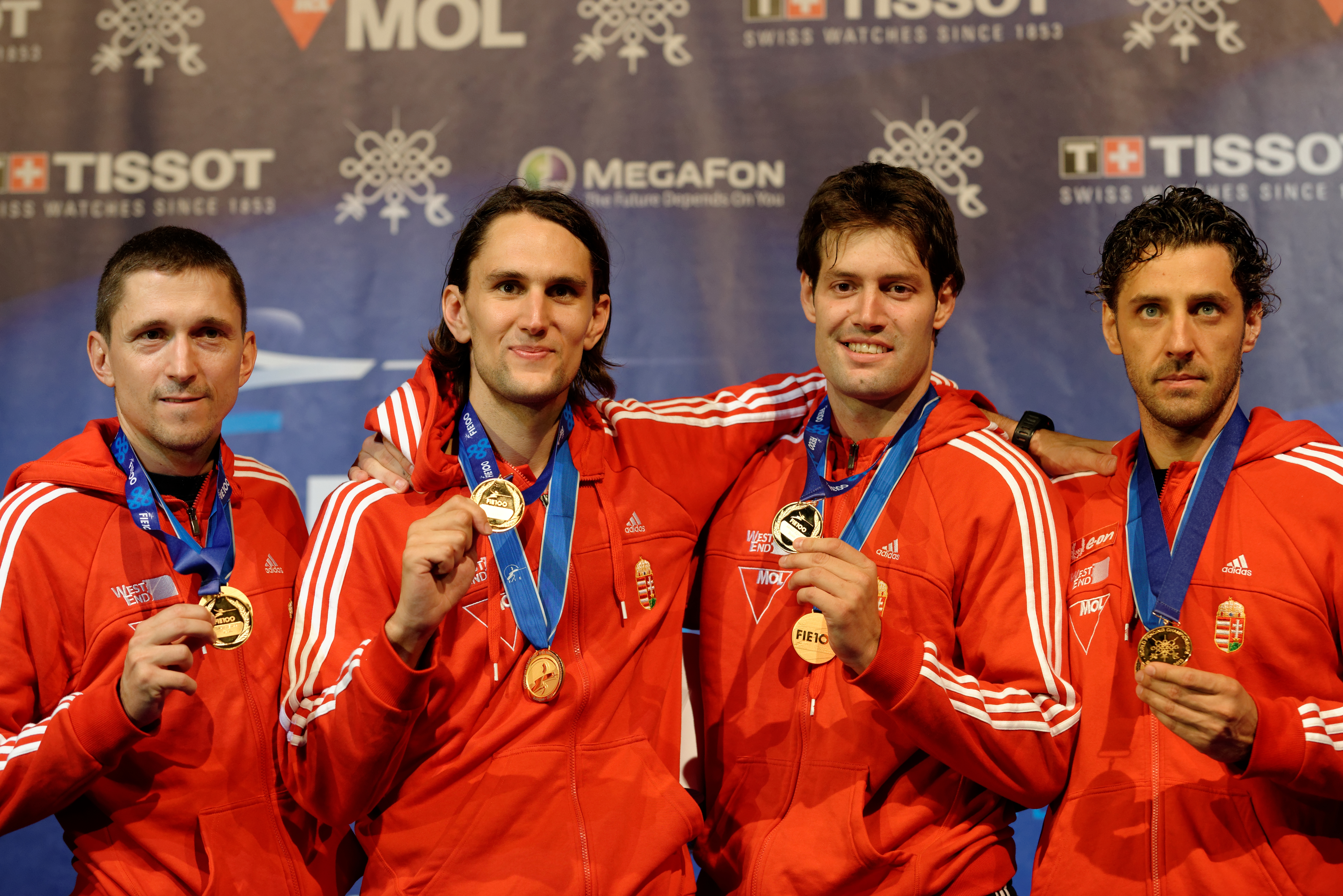
Hungary, 2013 World team champion

Rank	Nation
1st place, gold medalist(s)	Hungary
2nd place, silver medalist(s)	Ukraine
3rd place, bronze medalist(s)	France
4	Poland
5	Venezuela
6	Czech Republic
7	Italy
8	Israel
9	Switzerland
10	United States
11	Romania
12	Kazakhstan
13	Russia
14	Egypt
15	China
16	Kyrgyzstan
17	Estonia
18	Germany
19	Norway
20	Canada
21	South Korea
22	Hong Kong
23	Spain
24	Iran
25	Mexico
26	Finland
27	Uzbekistan
28	Japan
29	Australia
30	Colombia
31	Denmark
32	Slovakia
33	Morocco
34	Brazil
35	Singapore
36	Mongolia
37	Slovenia
38	Greece
39	Democratic Republic of the Congo
40	Serbia
41	Turkmenistan
