= 2001 European Fencing Championships =

The 2001 European Fencing Championships were held in Coblenz, Germany. The event took place from 3 to 8 June 2001.

== Medal summary ==
=== Men's events ===
Event	Gold	Silver	Bronze
Foil	Simone Vanni (ITA)	Adam Krzesiński (POL)	Ralf Bißdorf (GER); Attila Juhász (HUN)
Épée	Vitaly Zakharov (BLR)	Paolo Milanoli (ITA)	Pavel Kolobkov (RUS); Kaido Kaaberma (EST)
Sabre	Stanislav Pozdnyakov (RUS)	Julien Pillet (FRA)	Mihai Covaliu (ROU); Zsolt Nemcsik (HUN)
Team Foil	Germany	Belgium	Poland
Team Épée	Ukraine	Germany	France
Team Sabre	Russia	France	Hungary

=== Women's events ===
Event	Gold	Silver	Bronze
Foil	Valentina Vezzali (ITA)	Giovanna Trillini (ITA)	Edina Knapek (HUN); Sabine Bau (GER)
Épée	Ildikó Mincza-Nébald (HUN)	Tatiana Fakhrutdinova (RUS)	Hajnalka Király (HUN); Heidi Rohi (EST)
Sabre	Yelena Nechayeva (RUS)	Sandra Benad (GER)	Orsolya Nagy (HUN); Ilaria Bianco (ITA)
Team Foil	Italy	Hungary	Romania
Team Épée	Hungary	Russia	Ukraine
Team Sabre	Germany	Italy	Poland

=== Medal table ===
Rank	Nation	Gold	Silver	Bronze	Total
1	Italy	3	3	1	7
2	Russia	3	2	1	6
3	Germany	2	2	2	6
4	Hungary	2	1	6	9
5	Ukraine	1	0	1	2
6	Belarus	1	0	0	1
7	France	0	2	1	3
8	Poland	0	1	2	3
9	Belgium	0	1	0	1
10	Estonia	0	0	2	2
10	Romania	0	0	2	2
Totals (11 entries)		12	12	18	42
