= Hugues Obry =

French fencer and coach

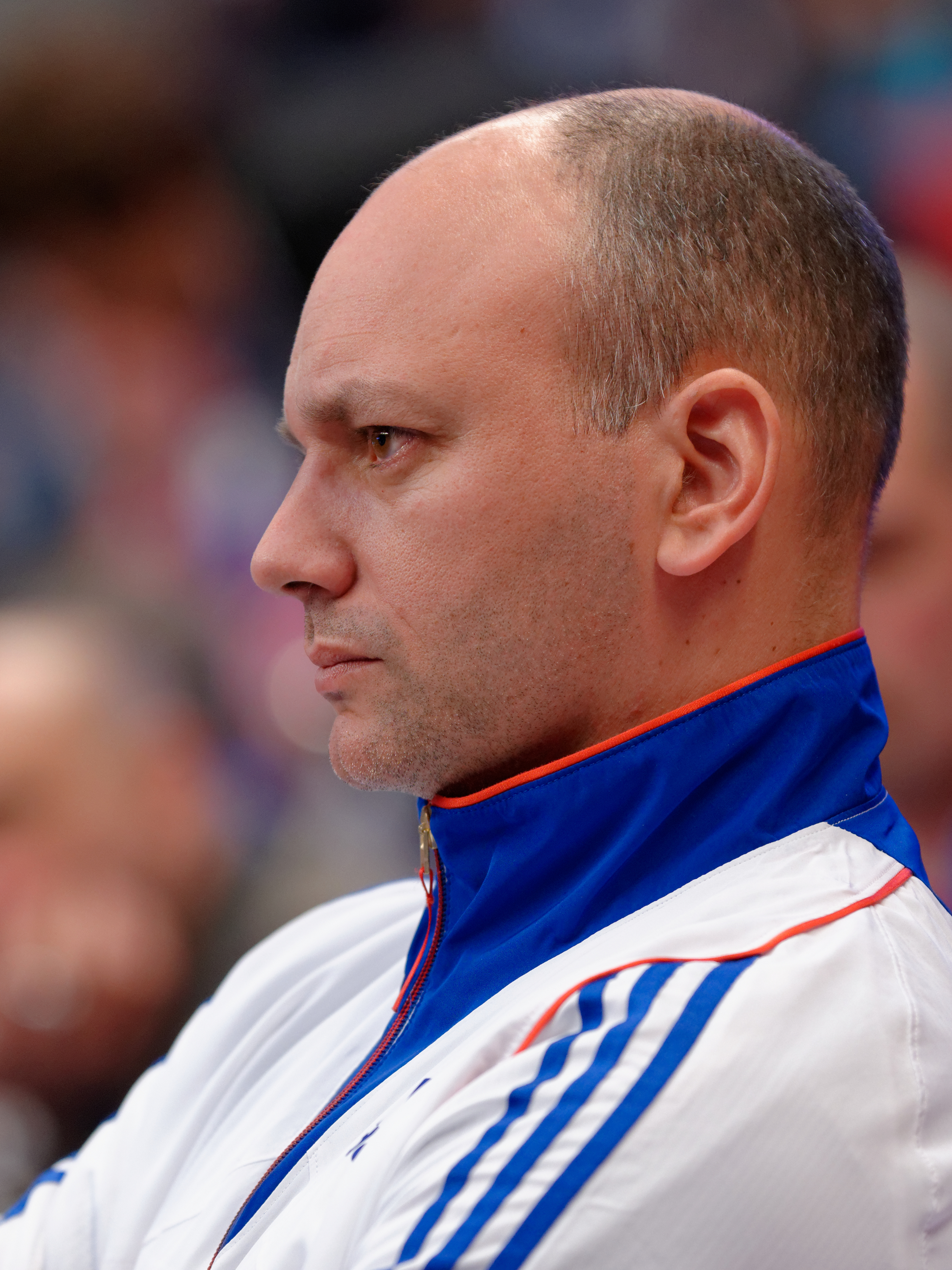

Personal information
- Nationality: French
- Born: 19 May 1973 (age 53) Enghien-les-Bains, France
- Height: 185 cm (6 ft 1 in)
- Weight: 75 kg (165 lb)

Sport
- Sport: Fencing
Medal record
Men's fencing
Representing France
Olympic Games
Gold medal – first place	2004 Athens	Épée, team
Silver medal – second place	2000 Sydney	Épée, team
Silver medal – second place	2000 Sydney	Épée, individual

Hugues Obry (born 19 May 1973) is a retired French fencer and current coach. He won a gold medal in team épée at the 2004 Summer Olympics in Athens, together with Érik Boisse, Fabrice Jeannet and Jérôme Jeannet. He won two silver medals at the 2000 Summer Olympics in Sydney.

Following his victory at the 2004 Olympic Games in Athens, he was made a chevalier of the Légion d'honneur.

Obry became assistant coach of the French men's épée team in 2008, and head coach from 2012 to 2016. He is also technical director of the Levallois Sporting Club.

Obry now coaches the Chinese Épée team.
