= Nelson Loyola =

Cuban fencer (born 1968)

Personal information
- Full name: Nelson Loyola Torriente
- Born: 3 August 1968 (age 57)

Sport
- Sport: Fencing
Medal record
Men's fencing
Representing Cuba
Olympic Games
Bronze medal – third place	2000 Sydney	Team épée
Pan American Games
Gold medal – first place	1999 Winnipeg	Team épée
Gold medal – first place	2003 Santo Domingo	Team épée
Silver medal – second place	2003 Santo Domingo	Team foil

Nelson Loyola Torriente (born 3 August 1968) is a Cuban fencer. He won a bronze medal in the team épée event at the 2000 Summer Olympics.

His son, Neisser Loyola, an épée fencer representing Belgium, earned a bronze medal in the individual men's épée at the 2022 World Fencing Championships.
