= Luc Cartillier =

Australian fencer

Personal information
- National team: Australia
- Born: 6 August 1964 (age 61) Algiers, Algeria

Sport
- Sport: Fencing
- Handedness: Right
- Club: The Fencing Club

Luc Cartillier (born 6 August 1964) is an Australian fencer. He competed in the team épée event at the 2000 Summer Olympics.
