= Frédéric Pierre (diver) =

French diver (born 1969)

Personal information
- Nationality: French
- Born: 3 July 1969 (age 56) Saint-Maur-des-Fossés, France

Sport
- Sport: Diving
Medal record
Men's diving
Representing France
European Championships
Bronze medal – third place	1997 Seville	10 m synchro

Frédéric Pierre (born 3 July 1969) is a French diver. He competed at the 1988 Summer Olympics, the 1992 Summer Olympics and the 2000 Summer Olympics.
