= Oleksandr Horbachuk =

Ukrainian fencer (born 1972)

Personal information
- Born: 11 October 1972 (age 54) Kharkiv, Soviet Union

Sport
- Sport: Fencing
Medal record
Men's épée
Representing Ukraine
European Championships
Gold medal – first place	2001 Coblenz	Team épée
Silver medal – second place	2003 Bourges	Team épée
Silver medal – second place	2005 Zalaegerszeg	Team épée
Bronze medal – third place	2002 Moscow	Team épée
Summer Universiade
Gold medal – first place	1997 Sicily	Individual épée
Gold medal – first place	1997 Sicily	Team épée
Silver medal – second place	1999 Mallorca	Individual épée

Oleksandr Horbachuk (born 11 October 1972) is a Ukrainian fencer. He competed in the individual épée event at the 2000 Summer Olympics.
