= Gilles Emptoz-Lacôte =

French diver (born 1977)

Personal information
- Nationality: French
- Born: 15 December 1977 (age 48) Paris, France

Sport
- Sport: Diving
Medal record
Men's diving
Representing France
European Championships
Bronze medal – third place	1997 Seville	10 m synchro

Gilles Emptoz-Lacôte (born 15 December 1977) is a French diver. He competed in three events at the 2000 Summer Olympics.
