= Carlos Pedroso =

Cuban fencer (1967–2024)

Carlos Alberto Pedroso
Personal information
- Full name: Carlos Alberto Pedroso Curiel
- Born: 28 January 1967
- Died: 25 December 2024 (aged 57) Cienfuegos, Cuba

Sport
- Country: Cuba
- Sport: Fencing
Medal record
Men's fencing
Representing Cuba
Olympic Games
Bronze medal – third place	2000 Sydney	Team épée
World Championships
Gold medal – first place	1997 Cape Town	Team épée
Bronze medal – third place	1989 Denver	Team épée
Bronze medal – third place	1998 La Chaux-de-Fonds	Individual épée
Bronze medal – third place	1999 Seoul	Team épée
Summer Universiade
Gold medal – first place	1989 Duisburg	Individual épée
Silver medal – second place	1989 Duisburg	Team épée
Bronze medal – third place	1987 Zagreb	Individual épée
Bronze medal – third place	1987 Zagreb	Team épée
Pan American Games
Gold medal – first place	1987 Indianapolis	Individual épée
Gold medal – first place	1987 Indianapolis	Team épée
Gold medal – first place	1995 Mar del Plata	Individual épée
Gold medal – first place	1995 Mar del Plata	Team épée
Gold medal – first place	1999 Winnipeg	Individual épée
Gold medal – first place	1999 Winnipeg	Team épée
Central American and Caribbean Games
Gold medal – first place	1986 Santiago	Team épée
Gold medal – first place	1998 Maracaibo	Individual épée
Gold medal – first place	1998 Maracaibo	Team épée

Carlos Alberto Pedroso Curiel (28 January 1967 – 25 December 2024) was a Cuban fencer. He won a bronze medal in the team épée event at the 2000 Summer Olympics. Pedroso died from burns suffered in a domestic incident, on 25 December 2024, at the age of 57.
