= Éric Srecki =

French fencer (born 1964)

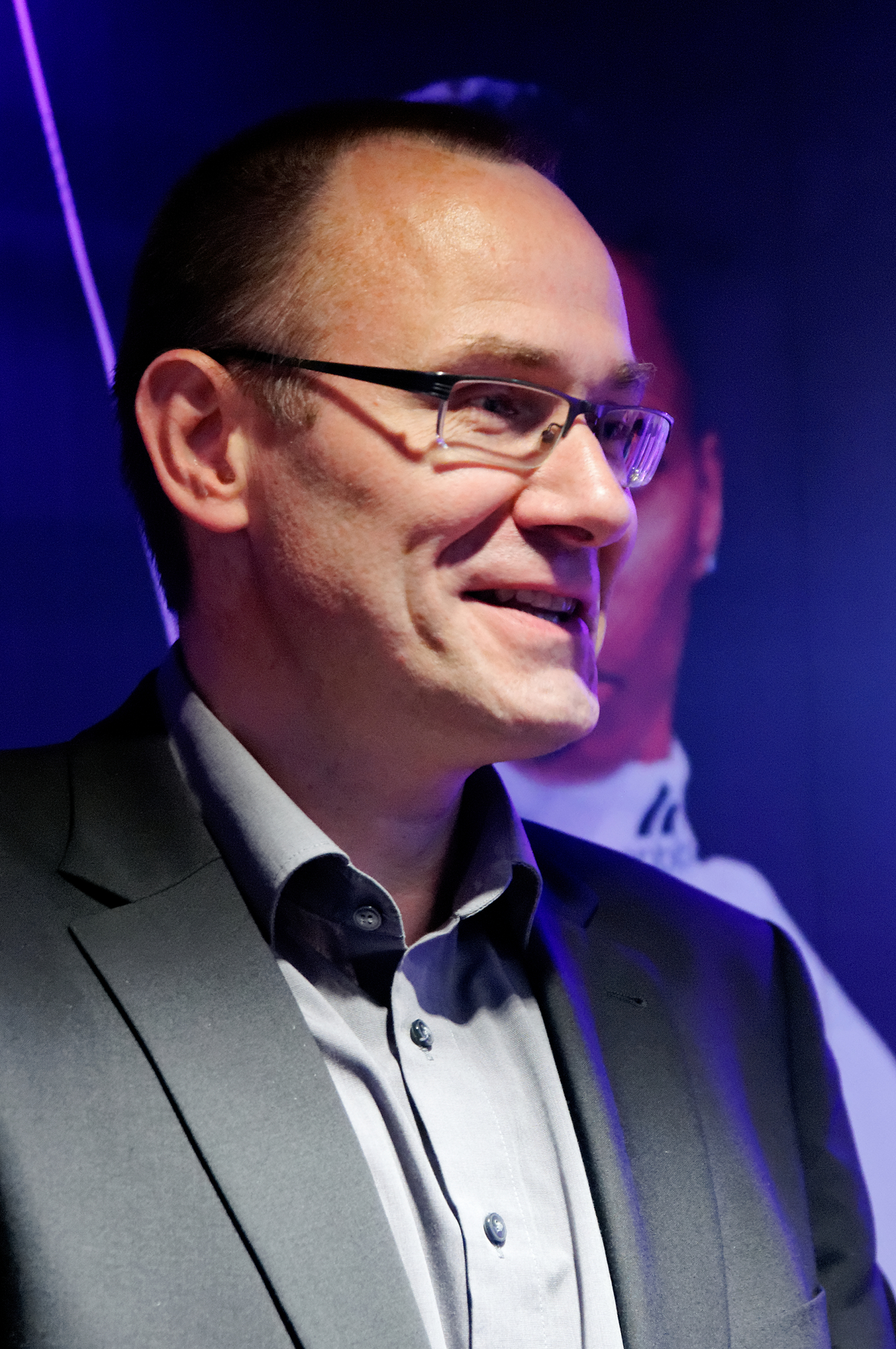
- Srecki at a press conference before the 2012 Summer Olympics

Personal information
- Born: 2 July 1964 (age 62) Béthune, France

Sport
- Sport: Fencing
Medal record
Men's fencing
Representing France
Olympic Games
Gold medal – first place	1988 Seoul	Team épée
Gold medal – first place	1992 Barcelona	Individual épée
Silver medal – second place	2000 Sydney	Team épée
Bronze medal – third place	1996 Atlanta	Team épée

Éric Srecki, born on 2 July 1964 in Béthune, Pas-de-Calais, is a French fencer and a champion in the épée competition at the Olympic and World champion levels.

He won a gold medal in individual épée event at the 1992 Summer Olympics in Barcelona. He won a team gold medal in 1988, silver in 2000, and a bronze medal in 1996. He won the individual Epee World Fencing Championships in 1995 and 1997.
