= Vitaly Zakharov =

Belarusian fencer (born 1967)

Personal information
- Born: 18 December 1967 (age 58) Fergana, Uzbekistan
- Height: 1.82 m (6 ft 0 in)
- Weight: 72 kg (159 lb)

Fencing career
- Sport: Fencing
- Weapon: épée
- Hand: right-handed
- Retired: 2009
- FIE ranking: archive
Medal record
Men's épée
Representing Belarus
World Championships
Bronze medal – third place	2002 Lisbon	Individual
Bronze medal – third place	2003 Havana	Individual
European Championships
Gold medal – first place	2001 Coblenz	Individual
Bronze medal – third place	1998 Plovdiv	Individual

Vitaly Zakharov (Russian: Виталий Георгиевич Захаров; born 18 December 1967) is a Belarusian épée fencer. He competed at the 1996 and 2000 Summer Olympics.
