= Paolo Milanoli =

Italian fencer (born 1969)

Personal information
- Born: 7 December 1969 (age 56) Alessandria, Italy

Sport
- Sport: Fencing
- Club: Fiamme Oro
Medal record
Representing Italy
Olympic Games
Gold medal – first place	2000 Sydney	Team épée
World Championships
Gold medal – first place	1993 Essen	Team épée
Gold medal – first place	2001 Nîmes	Individual épée
Summer Universiade
Silver medal – second place	1995 Fukuoka	Individual épée
Bronze medal – third place	1993 Buffalo	Team épée
Mediterranean Games
Gold medal – first place	2001 Tunis	Individual épée

Paolo Milanoli (born 7 December 1969) is an Italian former fencer. He won a gold medal in the team épée event at the 2000 Summer Olympics.
