= David Nathan (fencer) =

Australian fencer

Personal information
- Born: 12 October 1965 (age 60) Portland, Victoria, Australia

Sport
- Sport: Fencing

David Nathan (born 12 October 1965) is an Australian fencer. He competed in the individual épée event at the 2000 Summer Olympics.
