= Attila Fekete (fencer) =

Hungarian fencer

Personal information
- Born: 24 January 1974 (age 52) Halmeu, Satu Mare, Romania

Sport
- Sport: Fencing

Attila Fekete (born 24 January 1974) is a Romanian-born Hungarian fencer. He competed in the individual and team épée events at the 2000 Summer Olympics.
