= Michael Switak =

Austrian fencer

Personal information
- Born: 29 December 1973 (age 52) Innsbruck, Austria

Sport
- Sport: Fencing

Michael Switak (born 29 December 1973) is an Austrian fencer. He competed in the individual and team épée events at the 2000 Summer Olympics.
