= Vladimir Pchenikin =

Belarusian fencer (born 1970)

Personal information
- Born: 13 July 1970 (age 55)

Sport
- Sport: Fencing

Vladimir Pchenikin (born 13 July 1970) is a Belarusian fencer. He competed in the individual and team épée events at the 2000 Summer Olympics.
