= Marc-Konstantin Steifensand =

German fencer

Personal information
- Born: 14 May 1966 (age 60) Wuppertal, West Germany

Sport
- Sport: Fencing

Marc-Konstantin Steifensand (born 14 May 1966) is a German fencer. He competed in the individual and team épée events at the 2000 Summer Olympics.
