= Nick Heffernan =

Australian fencer

Personal information
- Born: 12 June 1974 (age 52) Melbourne, Australia
- Height: 184 cm (6 ft 0 in)
- Weight: 90 kg (198 lb)

Sport
- Sport: Fencing
- Club: VRI Fencing Club (Melbourne), The Fencing Club (Brisbane)

Nick Heffernan (born 12 June 1974) is an Australian fencer. He competed in the individual and team épée events at the 2000 Summer Olympics.
