= Jean-François Di Martino =

French fencer (born 1967)

Personal information
- Born: 2 March 1967 (age 59) Enghien-les-Bains, France

Sport
- Sport: Fencing
Medal record
Men's fencing
Representing France
Olympic Games
Silver medal – second place	2000 Sydney	Épée, team

Jean-François Di Martino (born 2 March 1967) is a French fencer. He won a silver medal in the team épée event at the 2000 Summer Olympics.
