= Oliver Kayser =

Austrian fencer

Personal information
- Born: 8 October 1973 (age 52) Innsbruck, Austria

Sport
- Sport: Fencing

Oliver Kayser (born 8 October 1973) is an Austrian fencer. He competed in the individual and team épée events at the 2000 Summer Olympics.
