= Iván Trevejo =

Cuban fencer

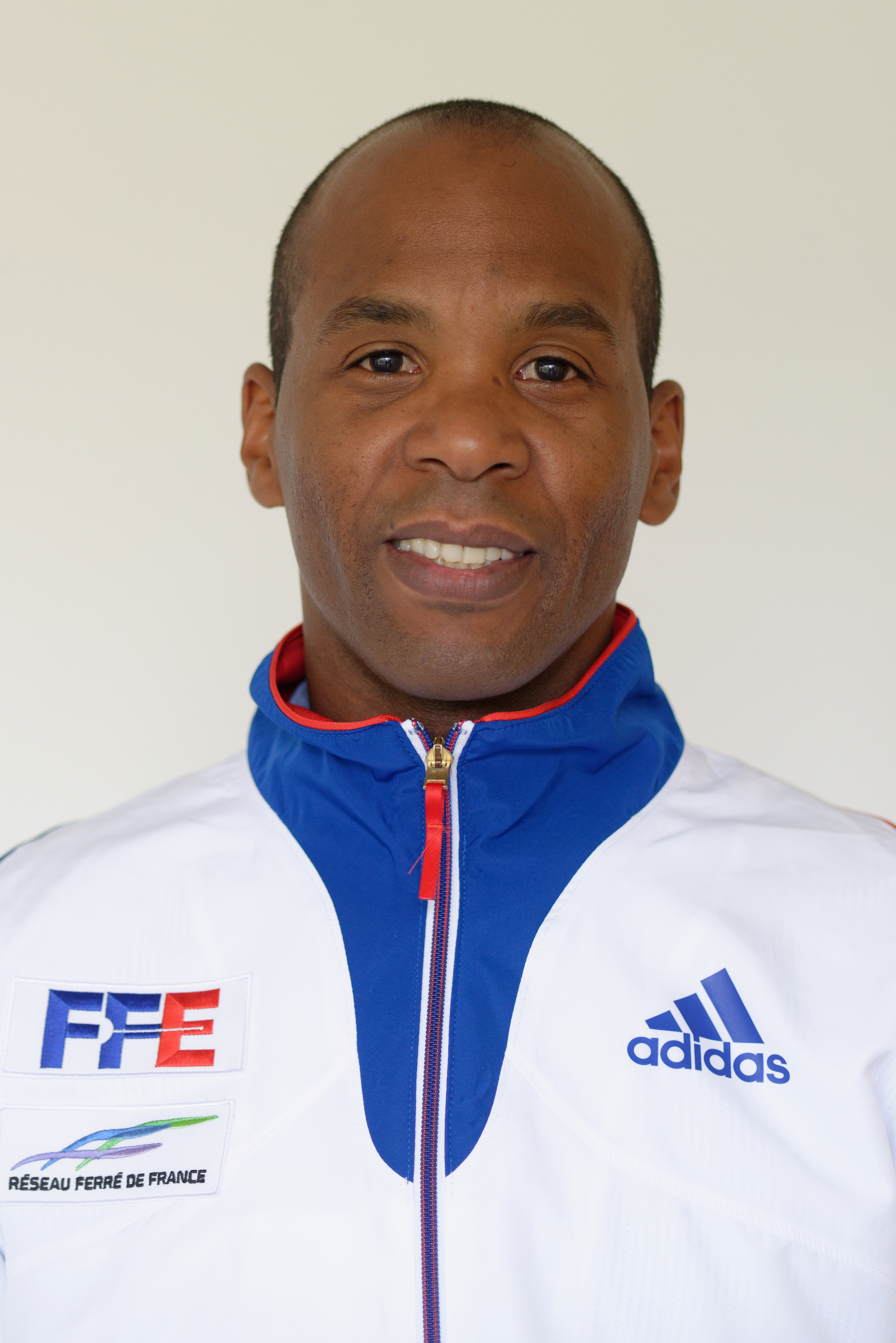
- Iván Trevejo in 2013

Personal information
- Full name: Iván Trevejo Pérez
- Nationality: French
- Born: 1 September 1971 (age 55) Havana, Cuba
- Home town: Sète, France
- Height: 1.84 m (6 ft 0 in)
- Weight: 82 kg (181 lb)

Fencing career
- Sport: Fencing
- Weapon: épée
- Hand: left-handed
- Club: Cercle d'Escrime de Saint-Gratien
- FIE ranking: current ranking (for France) ranking (archive, for Cuba)
Medal record
Representing Cuba
Olympic Games
Silver medal – second place	1996 Atlanta	Épée
Bronze medal – third place	2000 Sydney	Team épée
World Championships
Gold medal – first place	1997 Cape Town	Team épée
Bronze medal – third place	1999 Seoul	Team épée
Summer Universiade
Gold medal – first place	1993 Buffalo	Team épée
Silver medal – second place	1997 Catania	Individual épée
Pan American Games
Gold medal – first place	1991 Havana	Team épée
Gold medal – first place	1995 Mar del Plata	Team épée
Gold medal – first place	1999 Winnipeg	Team épée
Bronze medal – third place	1995 Mar del Plata	Individual épée
Central American and Caribbean Games
Gold medal – first place	1990 Mexico City	Team épée
Gold medal – first place	1993 Ponce	Individual épée
Gold medal – first place	1993 Ponce	Team épée
Gold medal – first place	1998 Maracaibo	Team épée
Representing France
World Championships
Bronze medal – third place	2013 Budapest	Team épée
European Games
Gold medal – first place	2015 Baku	Épée
Gold medal – first place	2015 Baku	Team épée

Iván Trevejo Pérez (born 1 September 1971) is a Cuban-born French fencer, silver Olympic medallist in 1996 and team world champion in 1997 for Cuba. He earned a team bronze medal for France in 2013.

== Biography ==
He won a silver medal in the individual épée event at the 1996 Summer Olympics and a bronze in the team event at the 2000 Summer Olympics for Cuba. He made world team champion at the 1997 World Fencing Championships in Cape Town and placed third in the team event of the 1999 World Fencing Championships in Seoul.

After the 2002 World Fencing Championships in Lisbon he decided not to go back to Cuba. He settled in Southern France and went on fencing on the national circuit. He married a French woman, had a daughter and eventually became a French citizen in 2010, which allowed him to be selected in the French fencing team. After ten years away from high-level competition, he reached the quarter-finals in the Legnano World Cup in January 2013 and won a bronze medal in the Challenge RFF (Paris World Cup) in May. He was a member of the French team that won the bronze medal in the World Championships in Budapest and finished the 2012–13 season at 10th place in FIE rankings. In the 2013–14 season he earned a bronze medal in the Legnano World Cup and in the Vancouver Grand Prix.
