= Andrey Murashko =

Belarusian fencer (born 1975)

Personal information
- Born: 13 January 1975 (age 51)

Sport
- Sport: Fencing

Andrey Murashko (born 13 January 1975) is a Belarusian fencer. He competed in the individual and team épée events at the 2000 Summer Olympics.
