= Christoph Marik =

Austrian fencer

Personal information
- Born: 12 November 1977 (age 48) Wiener Neustadt, Niederösterreich, Austria

Sport
- Sport: Fencing

Christoph Marik (born 12 November 1977) is an Austrian fencer. He competed in the épée events at the 2000 and 2004 Summer Olympics.
