= Kaido Kaaberma =

Estonian fencer (born 1968)

Personal information
- Born: 18 November 1968 (age 57) Haapsalu, then part of Estonian SSR, Soviet Union
- Height: 1.94 m (6 ft 4 in)
- Weight: 90 kg (200 lb)

Fencing career
- Sport: Fencing
- Weapon: Épée
- Hand: Right-handed
- FIE ranking: archive
Medal record
Men's épée fencing
World Championships
Representing Soviet Union
Gold medal – first place	1991 Budapest	Team épée
Bronze medal – third place	1990 Lyon	Team épée
Representing Estonia
Silver medal – second place	2001 Nîmes	Team épée
Bronze medal – third place	1999 Seoul	Individual épée
European Championships
Representing Estonia
Silver medal – second place	1997 Gdansk	Individual épée
Silver medal – second place	2000 Funchal	Individual épée
Bronze medal – third place	2001 Koblenz	Individual épée

Kaido Kaaberma (born 18 November 1968) is an Estonian épée fencer and coach.

Kaaberma won the bronze medal in the épée individual competition at the 1999 World Fencing Championships. He won a silver medal in 2001 with the Estonian épée team at the World Fencing Championships in Hungary.

Kaaberma won eight Estonian championships in épée fencing between the years 1988 and 2005. He has competed at the 1992, 1996 and 2000 Summer Olympics.

Awards
Preceded by Tiit Sokk	Estonian Sportsman of the Year; 1992	Succeeded by Indrek Sei
