= Meelis Loit =

Estonian fencer

Personal information
- Born: 15 April 1971 (age 55) Tallinn, then part of Estonian SSR, Soviet Union

Sport
- Sport: Fencing
Medal record
World Championships
| Silver medal – second place | 2001 Nîmes | Team epée |

Meelis Loit (born 15 April 1971) is an Estonian fencer. He competed in the individual and team épée events at the 1996 and 2000 Summer Olympics, but received no medals.

Loit's bout with Kovacs in the 2001 Team World Épée Championship helped instigate rules against passivity, because Loit refused to engage with his opponent.
