= Wang Weixin =

Chinese fencer

Personal information
- Born: 王偉新; 4 May 1975 (age 51)

Sport
- Sport: Fencing

Wang Weixin (Chinese: 王偉新) (born 4 May 1975) is a Chinese fencer. He competed in the individual and team épée events at the 2000 Summer Olympics.
