= Andrus Kajak =

Estonian fencer

Personal information
- Born: 11 September 1965 (age 60) Tallinn, then part of Estonian SSR, Soviet Union

Sport
- Sport: Fencing

Andrus Kajak (born 11 September 1965) is an Estonian fencer. He competed in the individual and team épée events at the 1996 and 2000 Summer Olympics.
