= Gerry Adams (fencer) =

Australian fencer

Personal information
- Born: 7 June 1962 (age 64) Castlemaine, Victoria, Australia

Sport
- Sport: Fencing

Gerard "Gerry" Damian Adams (born 7 June 1962) is an Australian fencer. He competed in the individual and team épée events at the 2000 Summer Olympics.
