= World and Olympic records set at the 1996 Summer Olympics =

A number of world records and Olympic records were set in various events at the 1996 Summer Olympics in Atlanta, United States.

== Records by sport ==
=== Cycling ===
| Event | Name | Nation | Time | Date | Record |
|---|---|---|---|---|---|
| Men's flying 200 m time trial | Gary Neiwand | Australia | 10"129 | 24 July | OR |
| Men's 1 km time trial | Florian Rousseau | France | 1'02"712 | 24 July | OR |
| Men's individual pursuit | Andrea Collinelli | Italy | 4'19"699 | 24 July | WR, OR |
| Men's team pursuit | Eduard Gritsun; Nikolay Kuznetsov; Aleksey Markov; Anton Chantyr | Russia | 4'08"785 | 26 July | OR |
| Men's team pursuit | Christophe Capelle; Philippe Ermenault; Jean-Michel Monin; Francis Moreau | France | 4'06"880 | 27 July | OR |
| Men's team pursuit | Christophe Capelle; Philippe Ermenault; Jean-Michel Monin; Francis Moreau | France | 4'05"930 | 27 July | OR |
| Women's flying 200 m time trial | Michelle Ferris | Australia | 11"212 | 24 July | OR |
| Women's individual pursuit | Antonella Bellutti | Italy | 3'34"130 | 25 July | OR |
| Women's individual pursuit | Antonella Bellutti | Italy | 3'32"371 | 25 July | OR |

OR = Olympic record, WR = World record

=== Men ===
| Event | Date | Round | Name | Nationality | Time | Record |
|---|---|---|---|---|---|---|
| 100m Breaststroke | 20 July | Heat 6 | Frédérik Deburghgraeve | Belgium | 1:00.60 | WR |
| 100m Butterfly | 24 July | Heat 7 | Scott Miller | Australia | 52.89 | OR |
| 100m Butterfly | 24 July | Final A | Denis Pankratov | Russia | 52.27 | WR |
| 200m Individual Medley | 25 July | Final A | Attila Czene | Hungary | 1:59.91 | OR |
| 4 × 100 m Freestyle Relay | 23 July | Final | Jon Olsen (49.94); Josh Davis (49.00); Brad Schumacher (49.02); Gary Hall, Jr. (47.45) | United States | 3:15.41 | OR |
| 4 × 100 m Medley Relay | 26 July | Final | Jeff Rouse (53.95); Jeremy Linn (1:00.32); Mark Henderson (52.39); Gary Hall, Jr. (48.18) | United States | 3:34.84 | WR |

=== Women ===
| Event | Date | Round | Name | Nationality | Time | Record |
|---|---|---|---|---|---|---|
| 100m Freestyle | 20 July | Final A | Le Jingyi | China | 54.50 | OR |
| 100m Breaststroke | 21 July | Heat 6 | Penny Heyns | South Africa | 1:07.02 | WR |
| 200m Breaststroke | 23 July | Heat 4 | Penny Heyns | South Africa | 2:26.63 | OR |
| 200m Breaststroke | 23 July | Final A | Penny Heyns | South Africa | 2:25.41 | OR |
| 4 × 100 m Freestyle Relay | 22 July | Final | Angel Martino (55.34); Amy Van Dyken (53.91); Catherine Fox (55.93); Jenny Thompson (54.11) | United States | 3:39.29 | OR |
| 4 × 200 m Freestyle Relay | 25 July | Heat 2 | Lisa Jacob (2:01.31); Ashley Whitney (2:01.77); Sheila Taormina (2:00.57); Annette Salmeen (2:01.34) | United States | 8:04.99 | OR |
| 4 × 200 m Freestyle Relay | 25 July | Final | Trina Jackson (1:59.71); Cristina Teuscher (1:58.86); Sheila Taormina (2:01.29); Jenny Thompson (1:56.83) | United States | 7:59.87 | OR |

== Men ==
Note: Any world record is also an Olympic record

| Event | Date | Round | Name | Nationality | Time | Record |
|---|---|---|---|---|---|---|
| 100m | 27 July | Final | Donovan Bailey | Canada | 9.84 | WR |
| 200m | 29 July | Final | Michael Johnson | United States | 19.32 | WR |
| 400m | 27 July | Final | Michael Johnson | United States | 43.49 | OR |
| 800m | 30 July | Final | Vebjørn Rodal | Norway | 1:42.58 | OR |
| 10,000m | 26 July | Final | Haile Gebrselassie | Ethiopia | 27:07.34 | OR |
| 110m hurdles | 28 July | Final | Allen Johnson | United States | 12.95 | OR |
| High jump | 30 July | Final | Charles Austin | United States | 2.39 | OR |
| Pole vault | 1 August | Final | Jean Galfione | France | 5.92 | OR |
| Triple jump | 2 August | Final | Kenny Harrison | United States | 18.09 | OR |
| Triple jump | 2 August | Final | Kenny Harrison | United States | 18.09 | OR |

== Women ==
| Event | Date | Round | Name | Nationality | Time | Record |
|---|---|---|---|---|---|---|
| 400m | 29 July | Final | Marie-José Pérec | France | 48.26 | OR |
| 5000m | 29 July | Final | Wang Junxia | China | 14:59.88 | OR |
| 400m hurdles | 2 August | Final | Deon Hemmings | Jamaica | 52.82 | OR |
| 10km race walk | 27 July | Final | Yelena Nikolayeva | Russia | 41:49 | OR |
| Triple jump | 30 July | Final | Inessa Kravets | Ukraine | 15.33 | OR |
