= Cycling at the 1996 Summer Olympics – Men's team pursuit =

Men's team pursuit at the Games of the XXVI Olympiad
- Venue: Stone Mountain Park Velodrome
- Date: 26 July 1996 (qualifying round & quarterfinals); 27 July 1996 (semifinals & final)
- Competitors: 17 teams from 17 nations

Medalists
1st place, gold medalist(s)		Christophe Capelle; Philippe Ermenault; Jean-Michel Monin; Francis Moreau	France
2nd place, silver medalist(s)		Eduard Gritsun; Nikolay Kuznetsov; Aleksey Markov; Anton Shantyr	Russia
3rd place, bronze medalist(s)		Brett Aitken; Bradley McGee; Stuart O'Grady; Timothy O'Shannessey; Dean Woods	Australia

The men's team pursuit event in cycling at the 1996 Summer Olympics competition consisted of matches between two teams of four cyclists. The teams started at opposite ends of the track. They had 16 laps (4 kilometres) in which to catch the other cyclist. If neither was caught before one had gone 16 laps, the times for the distance (based on the third rider of the team to cross the line) were used to determine the victor.

== Medalists ==
Gold	Silver	Bronze
France; Christophe Capelle; Philippe Ermenault; Jean-Michel Monin; Francis Moreau	Russia; Eduard Gritsun; Nikolay Kuznetsov; Alexei Markov; Anton Shantyr	Australia; Brett Aitken; Stuart O'Grady; Timothy O'Shannessey; Dean Woods

== Results ==
- Q denotes qualification by place in heat.
- q denotes qualification by overall place.
- DNS denotes did not start.
- DNF denotes did not finish.
- DQ denotes disqualification.
- NR denotes national record.
- OR denotes Olympic record.
- WR denotes world record.
- PB denotes personal best.
- SB denotes season best.

=== Qualifying round ===
For the qualifying round, teams did not face each other. Instead, they raced the 4000 metres by themselves. The top eight times qualified for the first competition round, with the other nine teams receiving a rank based on their time in this round.

Rank	Team	Names	Time	Qualification
1	France	Christophe Capelle; Philippe Ermenault; Jean-Michel Monin; Francis Moreau	4:09.570	q
2	Italy	Adler Capelli; Mauro Trentini; Andrea Collinelli; Cristiano Citton	4:09.695	q
3	Australia	Bradley McGee; Stuart O'Grady; Timothy O'Shannessey Dean Woods	4:09.750	q
4	Ukraine	Bohdan Bondaryev; Oleksandr Fedenko; Andriy Yatsenko; Alexander Simonenko	4:11.545	q
5	Russia	Eduard Gritsun; Nikolay Kuznetsov; Aleksey Markov; Anton Chantyr	4:11.665	q
6	United States	Dirk Copeland; Mariano Friedick; Adam Laurent; Michael McCarthy	4:11.950	q
7	Spain	Juan Martínez Oliver; Juan Llaneras; Bernardo González; Adolfo Alperi	4:12.780	q
8	New Zealand	Gregory Henderson; Brendon Cameron; Timothy Carswell; Julian Dean	4:15.140	q
9	Germany	Robert Bartko; Guido Fulst; Danilo Hondo; Heiko Szonn	4:15.140	
10	Great Britain	Robert Hayes; Matt Illingworth; Bryan Steel; Chris Newton	4:15.510	
11	Lithuania	Artūras Kasputis; Remigijus Lupeikis; Mindaugas Umaras; Arturas Trumpauskas	4:16.050	
12	Netherlands	Jarich Bakker; Robertus Michie Slippens; Richard Rozendaal; Peter Schep	4:16.175	
13	Denmark	Frederik Bertelsen; Jimmi Madsen; Michael Nielsen; Jacob Piil	4:16.175	
14	Argentina	Walter Pérez; Edgardo Simón; Gonzalo Garcia; Gabriel Curuchet	4:20.840	
15	South Korea	Jeon Dae-heung; Jeong Yeong-hun; Kim Jung-mo; No Yeong-sik	4:25.215	
16	Chile	José Medina; Luis Fernando Sepúlveda; Marco Arriagada; Marcelo Arriagada	4:25.960	
17	Colombia	Jhon García; Marlon Pérez; Yovani López; José Velásquez	4:26.400	

=== Match round- Quarter Finals ===
In the first round of match competition, teams were seeded into matches based on their times from the qualifying round. The fastest team faced the eighth-fastest, the second-fastest faced the third, and so forth. Winners advanced to the finals while losers in each match received a final ranking based on their time in the round.

Heat 1

Team	Names	Time	Qualification	Records	Overall Place
Russia	Eduard Gritsun, Nikolay Kuznetsov, Aleksey Markov, Anton Chantyr	4:08.785	Q	OR	(1st)
Ukraine	Bohdan Bondaryev, Oleksandr Fedenko, Andriy Yatsenko, Alexander Simonenko	4:12.794			(7th)

Heat 2

Team	Names	Time	Qualification	Overall Place
Australia	Bradley McGee, Stuart O'Grady, Timothy O'Shannessey, Dean Woods	4:09.650	Q	(4th)
United States	Dirk Copeland, Mariano Friedick, Adam Laurent, Michael McCarthy	4:12.470		(6th)

Heat 3

Team	Names	Time	Qualification	Overall Place
Italy	Adler Capelli, Mauro Trentini, Andrea Collinelli, Cristiano Citton	4:09.215	Q	(3rd)
Spain	Juan Martínez, Juan Llaneras, Bernardo González, Adolfo Alperi	4:11.310		(5th)

Heat 4

Team	Names	Time	Qualification	Overall Place
France	Christophe Capelle, Philippe Ermenault, Jean-Michel Monin, Francis Moreau	4:08.965	Q	(2nd)
New Zealand	Gregory Henderson, Brendon Cameron, Timothy Carswell, Julian Dean	4:15.610		(8th)

=== Match round- Semi-Finals ===
Winners advanced to the medal round while losers in each match received a final ranking based on their time in the round.

Heat 1

Team	Names	Time	Qualification	Records	Overall Place
France	Christophe Capelle, Philippe Ermenault, Jean-Michel Monin, Francis Moreau	4:06.880	Q	OR	(1st)
Italy	Adler Capelli, Mauro Trentini, Andrea Collinelli, Cristiano Citton	4:08.460			(4th)

Heat 2

Team	Names	Time	Qualification	Records	Overall Place
Russia	Eduard Gritsun, Nikolay Kuznetsov, Aleksey Markov, Anton Chantyr	4:06.885	Q		(2nd)
Australia	Bradley McGee, Stuart O'Grady, Timothy O'Shannessey, Dean Woods	4:07.570			(3rd)

=== Medal round ===
The third fastest team from the semi-finals received the bronze medal. The fastest two teams competed for the gold and silver medals.

Gold medal match

Team	Names	Time	Records
France	Christophe Capelle, Philippe Ermenault, Jean-Michel Monin, Francis Moreau	4:05.930	OR
Russia	Eduard Gritsun, Nikolay Kuznetsov, Aleksey Markov, Anton Chantyr	4:07.730	

== Final classification ==
The final classification was:

1. France
2. Russia
3. Australia
4. Italy
5. Spain
6. United States
7. Ukraine
8. New Zealand
