= Cycling at the 1996 Summer Olympics =

Cycling at the Games of the XXVI Olympiad
- Venues: Georgia International Horse Park; Atlanta and surrounding area Stone Mountain Velodrome
- Date: July 21–28, 1996
- Competitors: 477 from 68 nations

The cycling competitions at the 1996 Olympic Games in Atlanta consisted of three separate categories: road cycling, track cycling, and mountain biking. The road cycling events took place in downtown Atlanta, track cycling was carried out at the Stone Mountain velodrome in neighboring DeKalb County, and the mountain biking events were held at the Georgia International Horse Park in Conyers.

== Road ==
Games	Gold	Silver	Bronze
Men's road race	Pascal Richard; Switzerland	Rolf Sørensen; Denmark	Max Sciandri; Great Britain
Men's time trial	Miguel Indurain; Spain	Abraham Olano; Spain	Chris Boardman; Great Britain
Women's road race	Jeannie Longo; France	Imelda Chiappa; Italy	Clara Hughes; Canada
Women's time trial	Zulfiya Zabirova; Russia	Jeannie Longo; France	Clara Hughes; Canada

== Track ==
=== Men’s ===
Games	Gold	Silver	Bronze
points race	Silvio Martinello; Italy	Brian Walton; Canada	Stuart O'Grady; Australia
pursuit	Andrea Collinelli; Italy	Philippe Ermenault; France	Bradley McGee; Australia
team pursuit	France; Christophe Capelle; Philippe Ermenault; Jean-Michel Monin; Francis Moreau	Russia; Eduard Gritsun; Nikolay Kuznetsov; Alexei Markov; Anton Shantyr	Australia; Brett Aitken; Stuart O'Grady; Timothy O'Shannessey; Dean Woods
sprint	Jens Fiedler; Germany	Marty Nothstein; United States	Curt Harnett; Canada
time trial	Florian Rousseau; France	Erin Hartwell; United States	Takanobu Jumonji; Japan

=== Women’s ===
Games	Gold	Silver	Bronze
points race	Nathalie Lancien; France	Ingrid Haringa; Netherlands	Lucy Tyler-Sharman; Australia
pursuit	Antonella Bellutti; Italy	Marion Clignet; France	Judith Arndt; Germany
sprint	Félicia Ballanger; France	Michelle Ferris; Australia	Ingrid Haringa; Netherlands

== Mountain bike ==
Games	Gold	Silver	Bronze
Men's	Bart Brentjens; Netherlands	Thomas Frischknecht; Switzerland	Miguel Martinez; France
Women's	Paola Pezzo; Italy	Alison Sydor; Canada	Susan DeMattei; United States

== Medal table ==
Rank	Nation	Gold	Silver	Bronze	Total
1	France	5	3	1	9
2	Italy	4	1	0	5
3	Netherlands	1	1	1	3
4	Russia	1	1	0	2
4	Spain	1	1	0	2
4	Switzerland	1	1	0	2
7	Germany	1	0	1	2
8	Canada	0	2	3	5
9	United States	0	2	1	3
10	Australia	0	1	4	5
11	Denmark	0	1	0	1
12	Great Britain	0	0	2	2
13	Japan	0	0	1	1
Totals (13 entries)		14	14	14	42

== Broken records ==
Event	Name	Nation	Time	Date	Record
Men's flying 200 m time trial	Gary Neiwand	Australia	10"129	24 July	OR
Men's 1 km time trial	Florian Rousseau	France	1'02"712	24 July	OR
Men's individual pursuit	Andrea Collinelli	Italy	4'19"699	24 July	WR, OR
Men's team pursuit	Eduard Gritsun; Nikolay Kuznetsov; Aleksey Markov; Anton Chantyr	Russia	4'08"785	26 July	OR
Men's team pursuit	Christophe Capelle; Philippe Ermenault; Jean-Michel Monin; Francis Moreau	France	4'06"880	27 July	OR
Men's team pursuit	Christophe Capelle; Philippe Ermenault; Jean-Michel Monin; Francis Moreau	France	4'05"930	27 July	OR
Women's flying 200 m time trial	Michelle Ferris	Australia	11"212	24 July	OR
Women's individual pursuit	Antonella Bellutti	Italy	3'34"130	25 July	OR
Women's individual pursuit	Antonella Bellutti	Italy	3'32"371	25 July	OR

OR = Olympic record, WR = World record
