= Six Days of Nouméa =

Cycling race in Nouméa

Race details
- Region: Nouméa, New Caledonia, France
- Local name(s): Six jours de Nouméa
- Discipline: Track
- Type: Six-day racing

History
- First edition: 1977
- Editions: 18
- Final edition: 2003
- First winner: Paul Bonno (FRA); Daniel Morelon (FRA)
- Final winner: Robert Sassone (FRA); Jean-Michel Tessier (FRA)

The Six Days of Nouméa (French: Six Jours de Nouméa) was a six-day track cycling race held annually in Nouméa, capital of the French overseas territory of New Caledonia, from 1977 until 2003.

== Winners ==
Year	Winner	Second	Third
1977	(France) Paul Bonno (France) Daniel Morelon	(Australia) Keith Oliver (Australia) John Trevorrow	(France) Jean-Claude Lecourieux (France) Jean Testard
1978-1979	No race
1980	(Italy) Maurizio Bidinost (France) Bernard Vallet	(Australia) Kelvin Poole (Australia) Gary Sutton	(Switzerland) Daniel Gisiger (Switzerland) Patrick Moerlen
1981	(Italy) Maurizio Bidinost (Italy) Francesco Moser	(France) Serge Beucherie (France) Alain Bondue	(France) Jean-Claude Lecourieux (Netherlands) Roy Schuiten
1982	(Belgium) Diederik Foubert (Switzerland) Daniel Gisiger	(Australia) Michael Grenda (Australia) George West	(France) Pascal Carrara (Denmark) Jens Schröder
1983-1988	No race
1989	(Australia) Jamie Kelly (Australia) Mark Victor	(Australia) Gary Anderson (Australia) Stuart McLeay	(West Germany) Gerd Dörich (West Germany) Udo Liehner
1990	(West Germany) Andreas Beikirch (West Germany) Frank Kuhn	(France) Hervé Dagorne (France) Éric Magnin	(France) Frédéric Aubert (France) Christophe Bonte
1991	No race
1992	(France) Michel Dubreuil (Australia) Scott McGrory	(France) Daniel Pandelé (France) Dominique Père	(New Zealand) Graeme Miller (United States) Jeff Rutter
1993	(Australia) Tony Davis (Australia) Stephen Pate	(Germany) Robert Bartko (Germany) Stefan Steinweg	(France) Michel Dubreuil (France) Christian Pierron
1994	(France) Jean-Claude Colotti (France) Jean-Michel Monin	(France) Michel Dubreuil (France) Christian Pierron	(Australia) Scott McGrory (France) Marc Rousseau
1995	(France) Serge Barbara (New Zealand) Glen Thomson	(New Zealand) Graeme Miller (France) Jean-Michel Tessier	(France) Christophe Capelle (France) Pascal Chanteur
1996	(France) Michel Dubreuil (France) Carlos Da Cruz	(France) Christian Pierron (Germany) Andreas Walzer	(France) Jean-Michel Tessier (France) Robert Sassone
1997	(France) Jean-Michel Monin (France) Christian Pierron	(France) Jean-Michel Tessier (France) Robert Sassone	(France) Andy Flickinger (France) Jérôme Neuville
1998	(France) Jean-Michel Tessier (France) Robert Sassone	(New Zealand) Chris Jenner (Germany) Andreas Walzer	(Australia) Thimothy Lyons (Australia) Michael Rogers
1999	(France) Christian Pierron (France) Robert Sassone	(Australia) Hilton Clarke (Australia) Troy Clarke	(France) Steeve Clavier (France) Nicolas Nagle
2000	(Australia) Danny Clark (Australia) Graeme Brown	(New Zealand) Greg Henderson (New Zealand) Lee Vertongen	(Australia) Gareth Atkins (Australia) Nathan Clark
2001	(France) Jean-Michel Tessier (France) Robert Sassone	(France) Steeve Clavier (France) Nicolas Nagle	(Australia) Gareth Atkins (Australia) Nathan Clark
2002	(France) Jean-Michel Tessier (Italy) Adriano Baffi	(France) Franck Perque (France) Jérôme Neuville	(Germany) Erik Weispfennig (Germany) Stefan Steinweg
2003	(France) Robert Sassone (France) Jean-Michel Tessier	(Germany) Erik Weispfennig (Germany) Stefan Steinweg	(France) Franck Perque (France) Fabien Merciris
