= Cycling at the 2000 Summer Olympics – Men's Madison =

Cycling at the Olympics

These are the official results of the Men's Madison Team Race at the 2000 Summer Olympics in Sydney, Australia. There were a total number of 28 participants (fourteen couples) competing in the final, which was held on 21 September 2000.

== Medalists ==
Gold	Silver	Bronze
Brett Aitken and Scott McGrory (AUS)	Etienne De Wilde and Matthew Gilmore (BEL)	Silvio Martinello and Marco Villa (ITA)

== Final classification ==
RANK	NOC	Athletes	Points	Laps Behind
1	Australia	Brett Aitken and Scott McGrory	26	0
2	Belgium	Etienne De Wilde and Matthew Gilmore	22	0
3	Italy	Silvio Martinello and Marco Villa	15	0
4	Great Britain	Rob Hayles and Bradley Wiggins	13	0
5	Austria	Roland Garber and Werner Riebenbauer	10	0
6	Germany	Guido Fulst and Olaf Pollack	9	0
7	Argentina	Juan Curuchet and Gabriel Curuchet	9	0
8	Netherlands	Robert Slippens and Danny Stam	8	0
9	Ukraine	Oleksandr Fedenko and Vasyl Yakovlev	8	0
10	France	Christophe Capelle and Robert Sassone	5	0
11	Switzerland	Kurt Betschart and Bruno Risi	5	0
12	Denmark	Jimmi Madsen and Jakob Piil	5	0
13	Spain	Isaac Gálvez and Juan Llaneras	3	0
14	Russia	Eduard Gritsun and Anton Shantyr	5	2
