= Jens Mouris =

Dutch cyclist (born 1980)

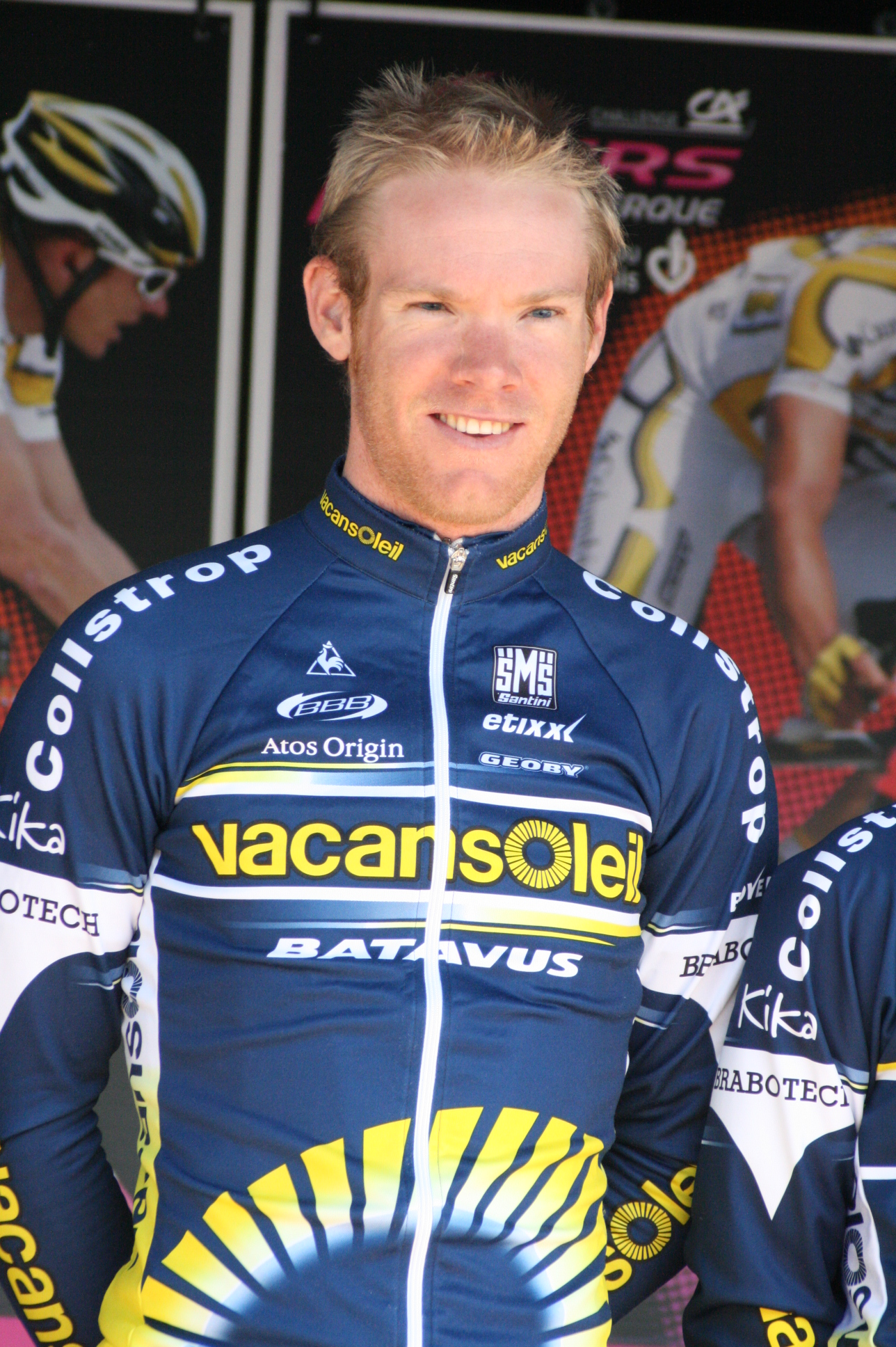
- Mouris at the 2010 Four Days of Dunkirk

Personal information
- Full name: Jens Mouris
- Born: 12 March 1980 (age 46) Amsterdam, the Netherlands
- Height: 197 cm (6 ft 6 in)
- Weight: 91 kg (201 lb; 14.3 st)

Cycling career
- Sport: Cycling
- Current team: Retired
- Disciplines: Road; Track
- Role: Rider
- Rider type: Classic cycle races

Amateur team
- 1999: Giant–Löwik

Professional teams
- 2000–2001: Van Vliet–Weba
- 2002–2003: Rabobank GS3
- 2004–2005: Axa Cycling Team
- 2006: Regiostrom–Senges
- 2007: DFL–Cyclingnews–Litespeed
- 2008: Mitsubishi–Jartazi
- 2009–2011: Vacansoleil
- 2012–2015: GreenEDGE
- 2016: Drapac Professional Cycling
- 2017: Roompot–Nederlandse Loterij
Medal record
Men's road bicycle racing
Representing Orica–GreenEDGE
World Championships
| Silver medal – second place | 2013 Tuscany | Team time trial |
| Silver medal – second place | 2014 Ponferrada | Team time trial |
| Bronze medal – third place | 2012 Valkenburg | Team time trial |

Jens Mouris (born 12 March 1980) is a Dutch former professional racing cyclist.

Born in Amsterdam, Mouris represented the Netherlands at the 2000 Summer Olympics in Sydney where he took part in the 4-kilometre (2.5-mile) team pursuit together with John den Braber, Robert Slippens and Wilco Zuijderwijk. They ended up in seventh position after being lapped by Ukraine in the quarter-finals. Four years later Mouris qualified for the same disciplines to participate in the 2004 Summer Olympics in Athens. This time the new team featuring Levi Heimans, Peter Schep and Jeroen Straathof came fifth.

== Major results ==
1998
2nd Points race, UCI Junior Track World Championships
1999
1st Ronde van de Haarlemmermeer
2000
1st Westfriese Dorpenomloop
2nd Time trial, Dutch National Under-23 Road Championships
3rd Kilo, Dutch National Track Championships
2001
1st Joseph Sunde Memorial
2nd Time trial, Dutch National Under-23 Road Championships
2nd Ronde van Noord-Holland
2002
1st Grote Rivierenprijs
2nd Time trial, Australian National Under-23 Road Championships
2nd Individual pursuit, Dutch National Track Championships
3rd Overall Olympia's Tour

1st Prologue

2003
7th Ronde van Noord-Holland
2004
1st Individual pursuit, Dutch National Track Championships
1st Ronde van Overijssel
1st Omloop van de Glazen Stad
2004 UCI Track Cycling World Cup Classics

2nd Team pursuit, Manchester
2nd Team pursuit, Sydney

2004–05 UCI Track Cycling World Cup Classics, Moscow

2nd Team pursuit
3rd Individual pursuit

2005
2005–06 UCI Track Cycling World Cup Classics

1st Individual pursuit, Moscow
3rd Team pursuit, Manchester

1st Prologue Ronde van Antwerpen
2nd Team pursuit, UCI Track Cycling World Championships
2006
1st European Omnium Championships
1st Madison, 2006–07 UCI Track Cycling World Cup Classics, Moscow (with Danny Stam)
2nd Individual pursuit, UCI Track Cycling World Championships
2005–06 UCI Track Cycling World Cup Classics, Carson

2nd Individual pursuit
2nd Madison (with Niki Terpstra)
2nd Team pursuit

2nd Overall Tour du Brabant Wallon

1st Stages 2 & 3

4th Neuseen Classics
6th Vlaamse Havenpijl
9th Ronde van Overijssel
2007
UEC European Track Championships

1st Madison (with Peter Schep)
3rd Omnium

1st Madison, 2006–07 UCI Track Cycling World Cup Classics, Manchester (with Peter Schep)
2007–08 UCI Track Cycling World Cup Classics

1st Madison, Sydney (with Peter Schep)
3rd Team pursuit, Beijing

2nd Individual pursuit, Dutch National Track Championships
9th Overall Driedaagse van West-Vlaanderen
2008
2nd Individual pursuit, Dutch National Track Championships
3rd Tallinn–Tartu GP
4th Overall Tour de Picardie
4th Overall Delta Tour Zeeland

1st Prologue

2009
3rd Overall Driedaagse van West-Vlaanderen
8th Ronde van het Groene Hart
2010
1st Ronde van het Groene Hart
3rd Ronde van Noord-Holland
4th Duo Normand (with Lieuwe Westra)
6th Overall Three Days of De Panne
6th Overall Delta Tour Zeeland
2011
2nd Time trial, Dutch National Road Championships
3rd Duo Normand (with Martijn Keizer)
6th Overall Driedaagse van West-Vlaanderen
2012
1st Stage 1 (TTT) Tirreno–Adriatico
1st Stage 2 (TTT) Eneco Tour
3rd Team time trial, UCI Road World Championships
2013
2nd Team time trial, UCI Road World Championships
2nd Duo Normand (with Michael Hepburn)
2014
2nd Team time trial, UCI Road World Championships

== See also ==
- List of Dutch Olympic cyclists
