= Richard Rozendaal =

Dutch cyclist

Personal information
- Full name: Richard Cornelis Jacobus Rozendaal
- Born: 6 April 1972 (age 54) Warmenhuizen, Netherlands
- Height: 183 cm (6 ft 0 in)
- Weight: 76 kg (168 lb)

Cycling career
- Sport: Cycling
- Discipline: Track cycling

Richard Cornelis Jacobus Rozendaal (born 6 April 1972) is a Dutch former track cyclist who competed for the Netherlands at the 1996 Summer Olympics. Born in Warmenhuizen, Rozendaal won three Dutch national championships: two in the points race event (1994 and 1997) and the 1997 individual pursuit. He competed in the men's team pursuit together with Robert Slippens, Jarich Bakker and Peter Schep. In the qualifying round of the event, the Dutch team finished 12th with a time of 4:16.175, and did not qualify for the quarter-finals.

== See also ==
- List of Dutch Olympic cyclists
