= 2003 UCI Track Cycling World Championships – Men's scratch =

Men's scratch at the 2003 UCI Track Cycling World Championships
- Venue: Manchester Velodrome, Manchester
- Date: 30 July 2003

The men's scratch event of the 2003 UCI Track Cycling World Championships was held on 30 July 2003.

== Results ==
Rank	Name	Nation
1	Franco Marvulli	Switzerland
2	Robert Sassone	France
3	Jean-Pierre Van Zyl	South Africa
4	Andreas Muller	Germany
5	Gregory Henderson	New Zealand
6	Alex Rasmussen	Denmark
7	Robert Slippens	Netherlands
8	Mark Renshaw	Australia
9	Alexander Gonzalez	Colombia
10	Roland Garber	Austria
11	Sergei Koudentsov	Russia
12	Matthew Gilmore	Belgium
13	Juan José De La Rosa Monsivais	Mexico
14	Petr Lazar	Czech Republic
15	Vasilis Anastopoulos	Greece
16	Siarhei Daubniuk	Belarus
17	Amir Zargari	Iran
18	Aivaras Baranauskas	Lithuania
19	Noriyuki Iijima	Japan
20	Claudio Masnata	Italy
21	Jukka Heinikainen	Finland
22	Guijun Shi	China
23	Mark Ernsting	Canada
24	Walter Perez	Argentina
25	Vasyl Yakovlev	Ukraine
26	Miguel Alzamora Riera	Spain
27	James Carney	United States
