= Peter Schep =

Dutch cyclist

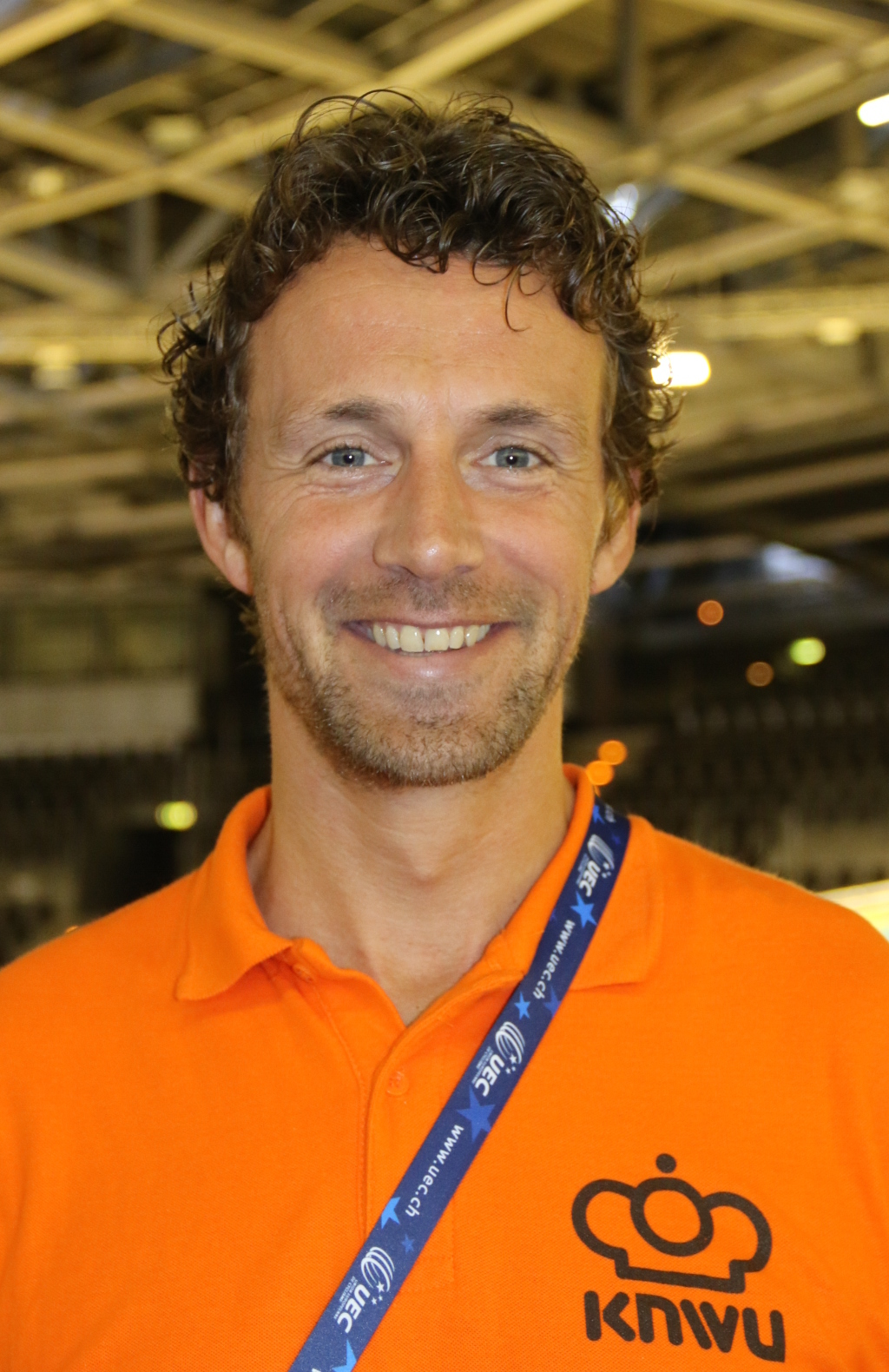
- Peter Schep (2017)

Personal information
- Full name: Pieter Otto Schep
- Born: 8 March 1977 (age 49) Lopik, the Netherlands
- Height: 1.89 m (6 ft 2 in)
- Weight: 80 kg (176 lb)

Cycling career
- Sport: Cycling
- Current team: Retired
- Disciplines: Track, road
- Role: Rider
- Rider type: Endurance

Professional teams
- 1998–2000: Rabobank Beloften
- 2000–2008: Axa Cycling Teamet–Gazelle
- 2009–2010: AA Drink
- 2011–2013: Ubbink–Koga
Medal record
Representing Netherlands
Men's track cycling
World Championships
Gold medal – first place	2006 Bordeaux	Points race
Silver medal – second place	2005 Los Angeles	Team pursuit
Silver medal – second place	2007 Palma de Mallorca	Points race
Silver medal – second place	2010 Ballerup	Points race
Bronze medal – third place	2008 Manchester	Points race
Bronze medal – third place	2011 Apeldoorn	Madison
European Championships
Gold medal – first place	2007 Alkmaar	Madison
Silver medal – second place	2006 Ballerup	Madison
Bronze medal – third place	2009 Ghent	Madison

Pieter Otto ("Peter") Schep (born 8 March 1977 in Lopik, Utrecht) is a Dutch former racing cyclist, who specialized in track cycling endurance events.

== Biography ==
Born in Lopik, Schep represented the Netherlands at the 1996, 2000 and 2004 Summer Olympics. In all three occasions he took part in the team pursuit. In 1996 he featured in a team with Jarich Bakker, Richard Rozendaal and Robert Slippens and finished in 12th position. A new team with Slippens, John den Braber, Jens Mouris and Wilco Zuijderwijk was created with success. The team improved their 2000 effort and reached the quarter finals where they were lapped by the team from Ukraine, resulting in a seventh place overall. Schep and Mouris also qualified for the same discipline in 2004, but this time they were joined by Levi Heimans and Jeroen Straathof. Yet again the previous effort was improved when the team finished fifth.

== Major results ==
2000
3rd Pursuit, Dutch National Track Championships
1st Stage 6, Olympia's Tour
2001
3rd Pursuit, Dutch National Track Championships
2003
1st (Netherlands) Scratch, Dutch National Track Championships
3rd Madison, Dutch National Track Championships
3rd Points race, Dutch National Track Championships
1st Stage 3, OZ Wielerweekend
2004
1st (Netherlands) Points race, Dutch National Track Championships
1st Stage 3, Ronde van Antwerpen
2005
2nd Points race, UCI Track World Championships
1st Classic 2000 Borculo
1st Points Race in Moscow (World Cup)
2nd Scratch, Dutch National Track Championships
2006
1st Points race, UCI Track World Championships
1st 6-Days of Amsterdam
1st Omloop van de Glazen Stad
1st Parel van de Veluwe
1st Omloop Schokland
2nd Madison, European Track Championships
2007
1st (Europe) Madison, European Track Championships (together with Jens Mouris)
1st Madison in Manchester (World Cup)
1st Stage 2, Ronde van Midden-Brabant
2nd Points Race, UCI Track World Championships
2nd Madison, 2007 Dutch National Track Championships (together with Jens Mouris)
2008
3rd Points race, UCI Track World Championships
2nd Points race, 2008 Dutch National Track Championships
1st (Netherlands) Madison, 2008 Dutch National Track Championships (together with Wim Stroetinga)
2009
2nd Points race, 2009 Dutch National Track Championships
2010
1st (Netherlands) Scratch, 2010 Dutch National Track Championships
1st (Netherlands) Madison, 2010 Dutch National Track Championships (together with Theo Bos)
2011

3rd Madison, 2011 Dutch National Track Championships (together with Wim Stroetinga)

== See also ==
- List of Dutch Olympic cyclists
