= 1998 Clásica de Almería =

Race details
- Dates: 1 March 1998
- Stages: 1
- Distance: 188 km (116.8 mi)
- Winning time: 4h 48' 07"

Results
	Winner	Mario Traversoni (ITA)
	Second	Francesco Arazzi (ITA)
	Third	Óscar Freire (ESP)

The 1998 Clásica de Almería was the 13th edition of the Clásica de Almería cycle race and was held on 1 March 1998. The race started in Puebla de Vícar and finished in Vera. The race was won by Mario Traversoni.

== General classification ==
Final general classification

Rank	Rider	Time
1	Mario Traversoni (ITA)	4h 48' 07"
2	Francesco Arazzi (ITA)	+ 0"
3	Óscar Freire (ESP)	+ 0"
4	Marcel Wüst (GER)	+ 0"
5	Dimitri Konyshev (RUS)	+ 0"
6	Markus Zberg (SUI)	+ 0"
7	Ángel Edo (ESP)	+ 0"
8	Miguel Ángel Martín Perdiguero (ESP)	+ 0"
9	Massimo Strazzer (ITA)	+ 0"
10	Francisco Jose Garcia (ESP)	+ 0"
