= 2003 Clásica de Almería =

Race details
- Dates: 2 March 2003
- Stages: 1
- Distance: 187 km (116.2 mi)
- Winning time: 4h 01' 30"

Results
	Winner	Luciano Pagliarini (BRA)
	Second	Massimo Strazzer (ITA)
	Third	Alexei Markov (RUS)

The 2003 Clásica de Almería was the 18th edition of the Clásica de Almería cycle race and was held on 2 March 2003. The race was won by Luciano Pagliarini.

== General classification ==
Final general classification

Rank	Rider	Time
1	Luciano Pagliarini (BRA)	4h 01' 30"
2	Massimo Strazzer (ITA)	+ 0"
3	Alexei Markov (RUS)	+ 0"
4	Bram de Groot (NED)	+ 0"
5	Marc Lotz (NED)	+ 0"
6	Ivan Herrero (ESP)	+ 0"
7	Francisco Gutiérrez (ESP)	+ 0"
8	Ruslan Ivanov (MDA)	+ 0"
9	Nico Sijmens (BEL)	+ 0"
10	Ángel Edo (ESP)	+ 0"
