= Clásica de Almería =

Spanish one-day road cycling race

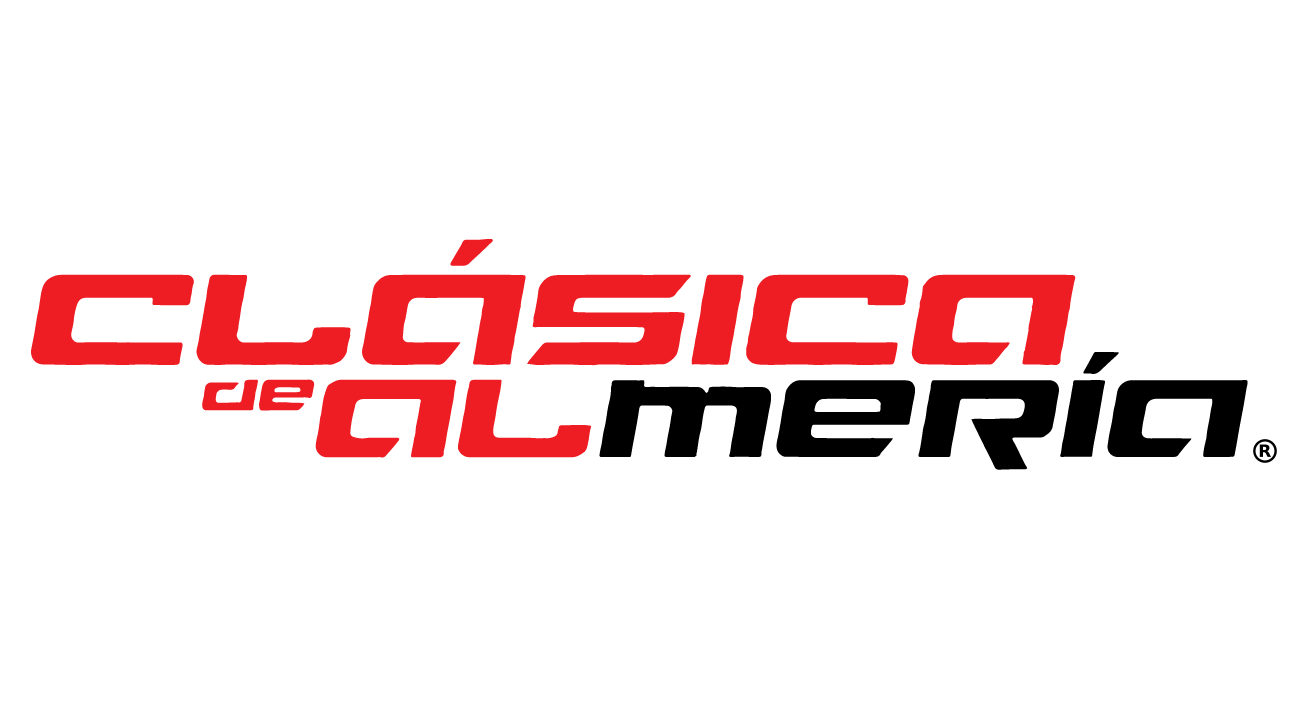

Race details
- Date: February–March
- Region: Almería, Spain
- English name: Classic of Almería
- Local name: Clásica de Almería (in Spanish)
- Discipline: Road race
- Competition: UCI ProSeries; UCI Women's ProSeries
- Type: Single-day
- Web site: clasicadealmeria.net

History (men)
- First edition: 1986
- Editions: 41 (as of 2026)
- First winner: Miguel Ángel Martínez Torres (ESP)
- Most wins: Massimo Strazzer (ITA) (2 wins)
- Most recent: Biniam Girmay (ERI)

History (women)
- First edition: 2023
- First winner: Emilie Fortin (CAN)
- Most recent: Federica Venturelli (ITA)

The Clásica de Almería (English: Classic of Almería) is a single-day road bicycle race held annually in February or March in Almería, Spain, starting and finishing in Almería itself. Established in 1986, the race was run as an amateur event in its first six years. In 1992, it became fully professional. From 2005, the race was organised as a 1.1 event on the UCI Europe Tour, and became part of the new UCI ProSeries in 2020 as a 1.Pro event.

Since 2023, a women's event has been held. In 2026, the women's race joined the UCI ProSeries.

== Winners ==
=== Men ===
Year	Country	Rider	Team
1986	Spain	Miguel Ángel Martínez	Spain (national team)
1987	Spain	Tomás Ortega	CAM
1988	Spain	José Gonzalez	Puertas Cerdán
1989	Spain	José Bernabé	Plastimer
1990	Spain	Bernardo González	CAM
1991	Spain	Asier Guenetxea	Kaiku
1992	Denmark	Kenneth Weltz	ONCE
1993	Russia	Viatcheslav Ekimov	Novemail–Histor–Laser Computer
1994	Belgium	Johan Capiot	TVM–Bison Kit
1995	Belgium	Jean-Pierre Heynderickx	Collstrop–Lystex
1996	Belgium	Wilfried Nelissen	Lotto–Isoglass
1997	Italy	Massimo Strazzer	Roslotto–ZG Mobili
1998	Italy	Mario Traversoni	Mercatone Uno–Bianchi
1999	Czech Republic	Ján Svorada	Lampre–Daikin
2000	Spain	Isaac Gálvez	Kelme–Costa Blanca
2001	Denmark	Tayeb Braikia	Lotto–Adecco
2002	Italy	Massimo Strazzer	Phonak
2003	Brazil	Luciano Pagliarini	Lampre
2004	France	Jérôme Pineau	Brioches La Boulangère
2005	Spain	Iván Gutiérrez	Illes Balears–Banesto
2006	Spain	Francisco Pérez	Caisse d'Epargne–Illes Balears
2007	Russia	Eduard Vorganov (Note: Giuseppe Muraglia tested positive for hCG after winning the 2007 Clásica de Almería.)	Karpin–Galicia
2008	Argentina	Juan José Haedo	Team CSC
2009	New Zealand	Greg Henderson	Team Columbia–High Road
2010	Netherlands	Theo Bos	Cervélo TestTeam
2011	Italy	Matteo Pelucchi	Geox–TMC
2012	Australia	Michael Matthews	Rabobank
2013	Australia	Mark Renshaw	Blanco Pro Cycling
2014	Ireland	Sam Bennett	NetApp–Endura
2015	Great Britain	Mark Cavendish	Etixx–Quick-Step
2016	Australia	Leigh Howard	IAM Cycling
2017	Denmark	Magnus Cort	Orica–Scott
2018	Australia	Caleb Ewan	Mitchelton–Scott
2019	Germany	Pascal Ackermann	Bora–Hansgrohe
2020	Germany	Pascal Ackermann	Bora–Hansgrohe
2021	Italy	Giacomo Nizzolo	Team Qhubeka Assos
2022	Norway	Alexander Kristoff	Intermarché–Wanty–Gobert Matériaux
2023	Italy	Matteo Moschetti	Q36.5 Pro Cycling Team
2024	Netherlands	Olav Kooij	Visma–Lease a Bike
2025	Belgium	Milan Fretin	Cofidis
2026	Eritrea	Biniam Girmay	NSN Cycling Team

==== Wins per country ====
Wins	Country
9	Spain
6	Italy
4	Australia; Belgium
3	Denmark
2	Germany; Netherlands; Russia
1	Argentina; Brazil; Czech Republic; Eritrea; France; Great Britain; Ireland; New Zealand; Norway

=== Women ===
Year	Country	Rider	Team
2023	Canada	Emilie Fortin	Cynisca Cycling
2024	United States	Lauren Stephens	Cynisca Cycling
2025	New Zealand	Ally Wollaston	FDJ–Suez
2026	Italy	Federica Venturelli	UAE Team ADQ
