= Ermenault =

Ermenault is a French surname. Notable people with the surname include:

- Corentin Ermenault (born 1996), French road and track cyclist
- Philippe Ermenault (born 1969), French track cyclist
