= 1999 Clásica de Almería =

Race details
- Dates: 28 February 1999
- Stages: 1
- Distance: 188 km (116.8 mi)
- Winning time: 5h 34' 41"

Results
	Winner	Ján Svorada (CZE)
	Second	Nicola Minali (ITA)
	Third	Marco Pantani (ESP)

The 1999 Clásica de Almería was the 14th edition of the Clásica de Almería cycle race and was held on 28 February 1999. The race started in Puebla de Vícar and finished in Vera. The race was won by Ján Svorada.

== General classification ==
Final general classification

Rank	Rider	Time
1	Ján Svorada (CZE)	5h 34' 41"
2	Nicola Minali (ITA)	+ 0"
3	Ángel Edo (ESP)	+ 0"
4	Julian Dean (NZL)	+ 0"
5	Geert Verheyen (BEL)	+ 0"
6	Markus Zberg (SUI)	+ 0"
7	Ramon Medina Esparza (ESP)	+ 0"
8	Marco Pantani (ITA)	+ 0"
9	Matteo Tosatto (ITA)	+ 0"
10	Karsten Kroon (NED)	+ 0"
