= Phillip Collins (cyclist) =

Irish cyclist

Philip Collins
Personal information
- Born: 10 January 1972 (age 54) Dublin, Ireland

Cycling career
- Sport: Cycling

Phillip Collins (born 10 January 1972) is an Irish former cyclist. He competed in the men's individual pursuit at the 1996 Summer Olympics.
