= Werner Riebenbauer =

Austrian cyclist

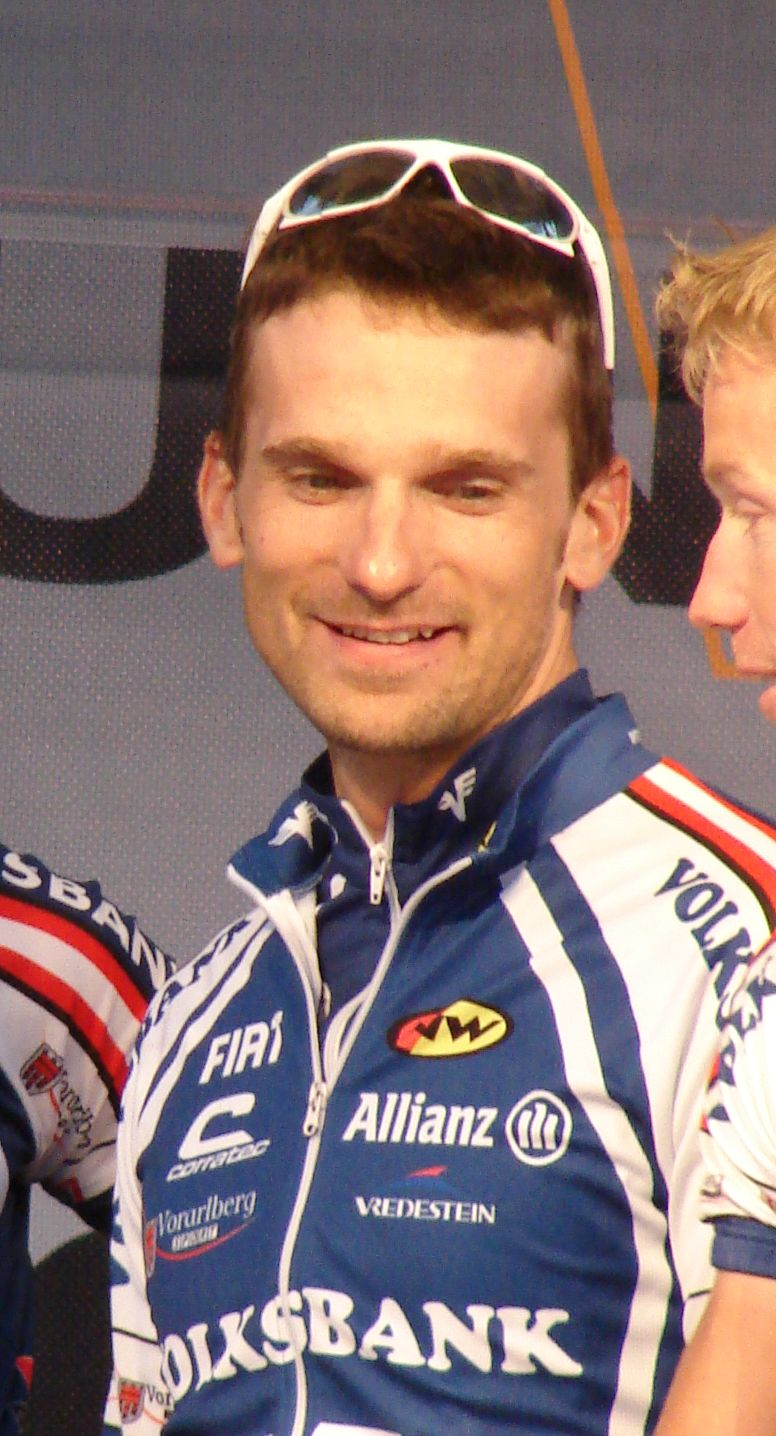
- Werner Riebenbauer in 2007

Personal information
- Born: 7 July 1974 (age 52) Vienna, Austria

Cycling career
- Sport: Cycling
- Disciplines: Track; Road
- Role: Rider

Professional teams
- 2001–2002: Team Nürnberger
- 2003: Team Fakta
- 2004–2005: Team Hervis Apo Sport
- 2006–2007: Vorarlberger
- 2008–2012: RC Arbö–Wels–Gourmetfein

Werner Riebenbauer (born 7 July 1974) is an Austrian former road and track cyclist. He competed in the road race at the 1996 Summer Olympics and in the madison at the 2000 Summer Olympics. He won the Austrian National Road Race Championships in 2000. He also competed in two events at the 2010 UCI Track Cycling World Championships. He also rode in the 2003 Giro d'Italia, but did not finish.

== Major results ==
2000
1st Road race, National Road Championships
2001
1st Stage 1 Vuelta a Murcia
1st Stage 1 Tour of Austria
9th HEW Cyclassics
2003
3rd G.P. Costa degli Etruschi
2004
8th Raiffeisen Grand Prix
2005
7th Overall Tour of Southland
10th GP Jamp
2006
3rd Raiffeisen Grand Prix
4th Salzkammergut-Giro
2008
10th Raiffeisen Grand Prix
2011
4th Ljubljana–Zagreb
2012
1st Stage 3 Okolo Slovenska
7th Banja Luka–Belgrade I
