= Adam Laurent =

American cyclist

Adam Laurent OLY
Personal information
- Born: July 6, 1971 (age 55) Santa Cruz, California, United States

Cycling career
- Sport: Cycling
- Disciplines: Track; Road
- Role: Rider

Professional teams
- 1997: Plymouth–Ellsworth
- 1998: Navigators
- 2000: Shaklee
Medal record
Representing United States
Men's track cycling
World Championships
Silver medal – second place	1994 Palermo	Team pursuit
Pan American Games
Gold medal – first place	1999 Winnipeg	Team pursuit

Adam John George Laurent (born July 6, 1971) is an American former cyclist. He competed in the men's team pursuit at the 1996 Summer Olympics.
