= 2002 Clásica de Almería =

Race details
- Dates: 3 March 2002
- Stages: 1
- Distance: 174 km (108.1 mi)
- Winning time: 3h 54' 36"

Results
	Winner	Massimo Strazzer (ITA)
	Second	Markus Zberg (SUI)
	Third	Marc Lotz (NED)

The 2002 Clásica de Almería was the 17th edition of the Clásica de Almería cycle race and was held on 3 March 2002. The race was won by Massimo Strazzer.

== General classification ==
Final general classification

Rank	Rider	Time
1	Massimo Strazzer (ITA)	3h 54' 36"
2	Markus Zberg (SUI)	+ 0"
3	Marc Lotz (NED)	+ 0"
4	Ángel Edo (ESP)	+ 0"
5	Iñigo Landaluze (ESP)	+ 0"
6	Torsten Nitsche (GER)	+ 0"
7	Pablo Lastras (ESP)	+ 0"
8	Alejandro Valverde (ESP)	+ 0"
9	Eduard Gritsun (RUS)	+ 0"
10	Gustavo Mario Toledo (ARG)	+ 0"
