= Tim O'Shannessey =

Australian cyclist (born 1972)

Personal information
- Full name: Timothy Leo O'Shannessey
- Born: 14 June 1972 (age 54) Burnie, Tasmania, Australia

Cycling career
- Sport: Cycling
- Discipline: Track
- Role: Rider
Medal record
Representing Australia
Track cycling
Olympic Games
Bronze medal – third place	1996 Atlanta	Team pursuit
UCI Track World Championships
Gold medal – first place	1993 Hamar	Team pursuit
Gold medal – first place	1995 Bogota	Team pursuit
Bronze medal – third place	1994 Palermo	Team pursuit
Commonwealth Games
Gold medal – first place	1994 Victoria	Team Pursuit
Bronze medal – third place	1994 Victoria	1000m Time Trial

Timothy Leo O'Shannessey (born 14 June 1972) is an Australian cyclist. He won the bronze medal in Men's team pursuit in the 1996 Summer Olympics.

At the 1994 Commonwealth Games in Victoria, Canada, O'Shannessey won a gold medal in the team pursuit and a bronze medal in the 1000–metre time trial.

Prior to the 2000 Sydney Olympics, O'Shannessey was suspended for two years after returning a test result of a high testosterone level.
