= 1996 Clásica de Almería =

Race details
- Dates: 17 February 1996
- Stages: 1
- Distance: 171 km (106.3 mi)
- Winning time: 4h 04' 00"

Results
	Winner	Wilfried Nelissen (BEL)
	Second	Asier Guenetxea (ESP)
	Third	Jesper Skibby (DEN)

The 1996 Clásica de Almería was the 11th edition of the Clásica de Almería cycle race and was held on 17 February 1996. The race was won by Wilfried Nelissen.

== General classification ==
Final general classification

Rank	Rider	Time
1	Wilfried Nelissen (BEL)	4h 04' 00"
2	Asier Guenetxea (ESP)	+ 0"
3	Jesper Skibby (DEN)	+ 0"
4	Jeremy Hunt (GBR)	+ 0"
5	Federico Colonna (ITA)	+ 0"
6	Ángel Edo (ESP)	+ 0"
7	Gian Matteo Fagnini (ITA)	+ 0"
8	Michael Blaudzun (DEN)	+ 0"
9	David Etxebarria (ESP)	+ 0"
10	Peter Van Petegem (BEL)	+ 0"
