= 1996 Tour du Haut Var =

Race details
- Dates: 24 February 1996
- Stages: 1
- Distance: 199 km (123.7 mi)
- Winning time: 4h 59' 28"

Results
| | Winner | Bruno Boscardin (SUI) |
| | Second | Léon van Bon (NED) |
| | Third | Tristan Hoffman (NED) |

The 1996 Tour du Haut Var was the 28th edition of the Tour du Haut Var cycle race and was held on 24 February 1996. The race started in Draguignan and finished in Fréjus. The race was won by Bruno Boscardin.

== General classification ==
Final general classification

| Rank | Rider | Time |
|---|---|---|
| 1 | Bruno Boscardin (SUI) | 4h 59' 28" |
| 2 | Léon van Bon (NED) | + 0" |
| 3 | Tristan Hoffman (NED) | + 0" |
| 4 | Christophe Capelle (FRA) | + 0" |
| 5 | Johan Museeuw (BEL) | + 0" |
| 6 | Laurent Jalabert (FRA) | + 0" |
| 7 | Gianluca Pianegonda (ITA) | + 0" |
| 8 | Andrei Tchmil (UKR) | + 0" |
| 9 | Mario Aerts (BEL) | + 0" |
| 10 | Jan Ullrich (GER) | + 0" |
