= Yovani López =

Colombian cyclist

Personal information
- Born: 23 March 1975 (age 51)

Cycling career
- Sport: Cycling

Yovani López (born 23 March 1975) is a Colombian cyclist. He competed in the men's team pursuit at the 1996 Summer Olympics.
