= Robert Sassone (cyclist) =

French cyclist

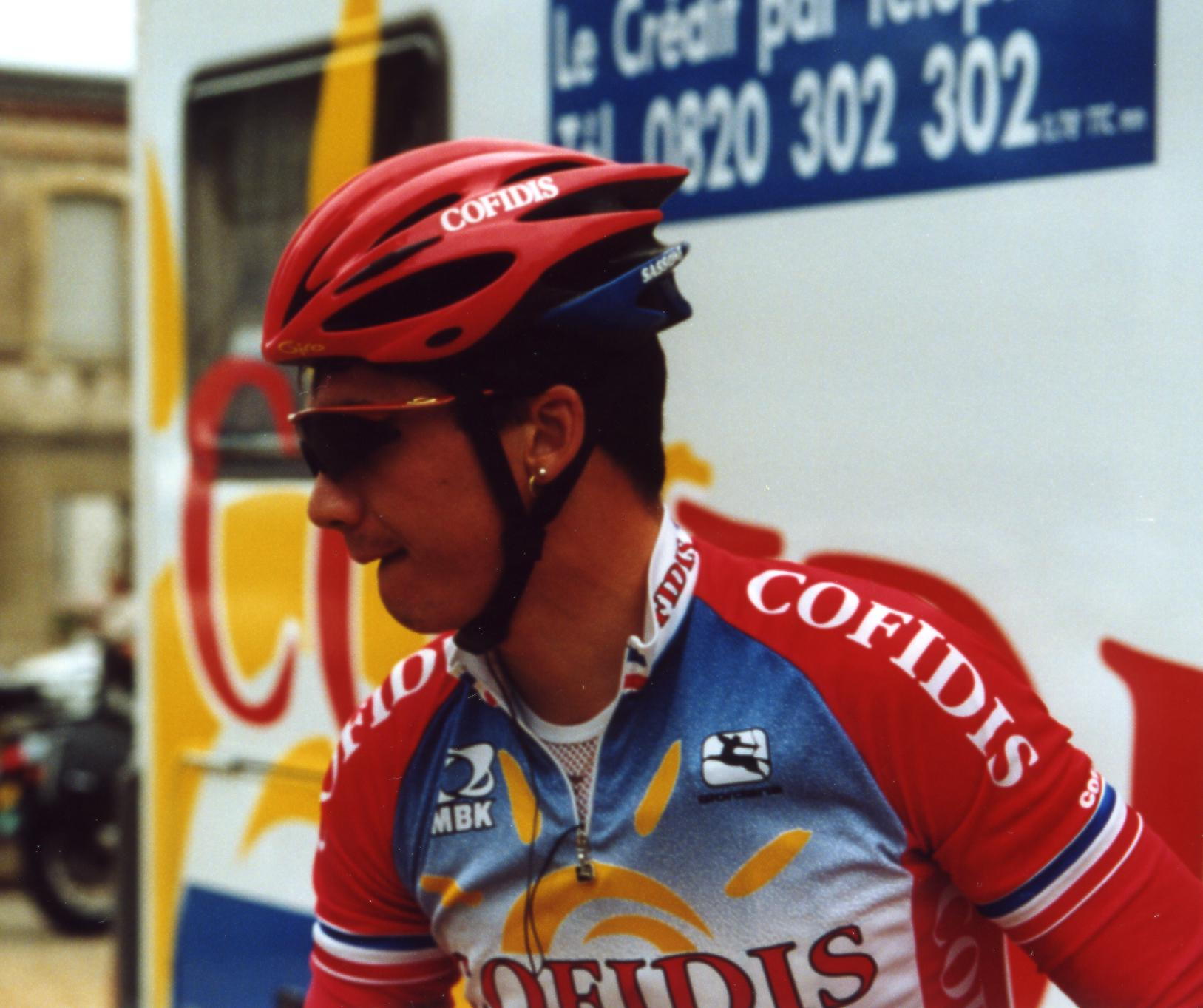
- Robert Sassone in 2001

Personal information
- Born: 23 November 1978 Nouméa, New Caledonia
- Died: 21 January 2016 (aged 37) Nouméa, New Caledonia

Cycling career
- Sport: Cycling
- Disciplines: Road and track
- Role: Rider

Professional team
- 2000–2003: Cofidis

Robert Sassone (23 November 1978 – 21 January 2016) was a French racing cyclist. He had cancer and killed himself.

He rode in the men's Madison at the 2000 Summer Olympics. He also rode in the 2002 Vuelta a España, finishing in 129th place. He was banned from cycling for two years in 2004, after testing positive for betamethasone during the Six Days of Nouméa race in New Caledonia.

== Death ==
Sassone was suffering from cancer and killed himself in his native New Caledonia in January 2016, aged 37.

== Major results ==
=== Road ===
2001
8th Overall Circuit des Mines

1st Stages 4 & 8

2002
1st Stage 3 Tour du Limousin
2003
1st Stage 2 Tour du Poitou-Charentes
3rd Kampioenschap van Vlaanderen

=== Track ===
1996
3rd Six Days of Nouméa (with Jean-Michel Tessier)
1997
2nd Six Days of Nouméa (with Jean-Michel Tessier)
1998
1st Six Days of Nouméa (with Jean-Michel Tessier)
1999
1st Madison, UEC European Track Championships (with Damien Pommereau)
1st Six Days of Nouméa (with Christian Pierron)
2000
National Track Championships

1st Madison (with Damien Pommereau)
1st Team pursuit (with Francis Moreau, Philippe Gaumont and Damien Pommereau)

2001
1st Madison, UCI World Track Championships (with Jérôme Neuville)
National Track Championships

1st Points race
1st Madison (with Jean-Michel Tessier)

1st Six Days of Nouméa (with Jean-Michel Tessier)
UCI World Cup

1st Team pursuit, Mexico
3rd Team pursuit, Cali

2002
1st Madison, National Track Championships (with Jean-Michel Tessier)
2003
1st Six Days of Nouméa (with Jean-Michel Tessier)
2nd Scratch, UCI World Track Championships
3rd Madison, National Track Championships
