= 1997 Clásica de Almería =

Race details
- Dates: 2 March 1997
- Stages: 1
- Distance: 188 km (116.8 mi)
- Winning time: 4h 43' 51"

Results
	Winner	Massimo Strazzer (ITA)
	Second	Max van Heeswijk (NED)
	Third	Ján Svorada (CZE)

The 1997 Clásica de Almería was the 12th edition of the Clásica de Almería cycle race and was held on 2 March 1997. The race was won by Massimo Strazzer.

== General classification ==
Final general classification

Rank	Rider	Time
1	Massimo Strazzer (ITA)	4h 43' 51"
2	Max van Heeswijk (NED)	+ 0"
3	Ján Svorada (CZE)	+ 0"
4	Serguei Smetanine (RUS)	+ 0"
5	Jeremy Hunt (GBR)	+ 0"
6	Federico Colonna (ITA)	+ 0"
7	Marco Artunghi (ITA)	+ 0"
8	Maurizio Molinari (ITA)	+ 0"
9	Mario Chiesa (ITA)	+ 0"
10	José Javier Gómez (ESP)	+ 0"
