= Ángel Edo =

Spanish cyclist

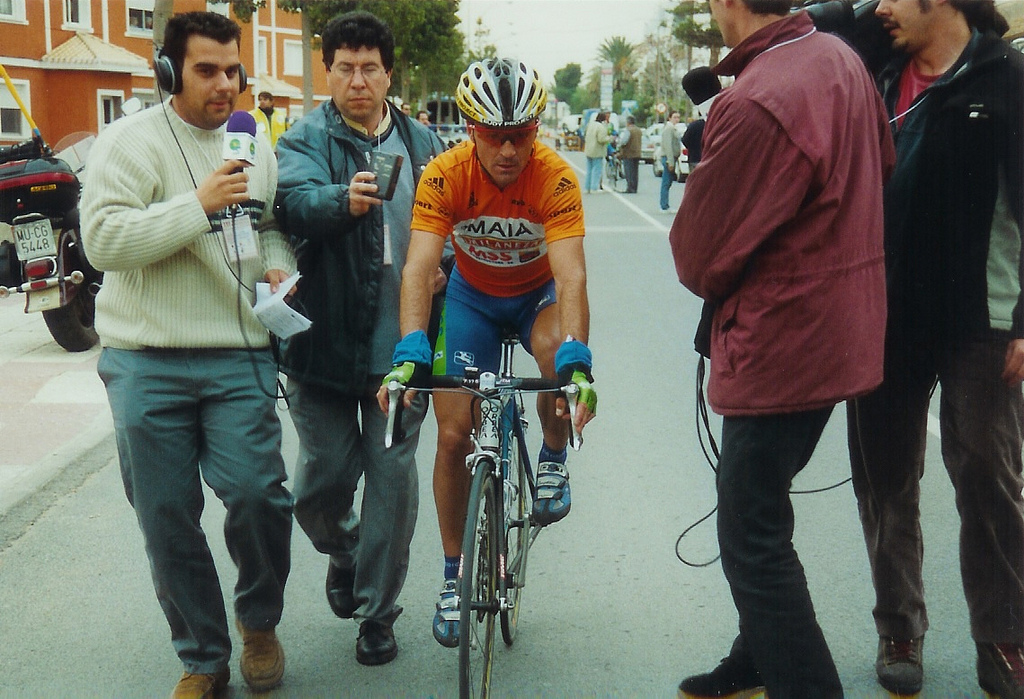

Personal information
- Full name: Ángel Edo Alsina
- Born: 4 August 1970 (age 56) Gavà, Spain
- Height: 1.74 m (5 ft 9 in)
- Weight: 62 kg (137 lb)

Cycling career
- Sport: Cycling
- Current team: Retired
- Discipline: Road
- Role: Rider
- Rider type: Sprinter

Professional teams
- 1992–1999: Kelme–Don Cafe
- 2000–2004: União Ciclista da Maia–MSS
- 2005: Saunier Duval–Prodir
- 2006: Andalucía–Paul Versan
- 2007: Vitória–ASC

Major wins
- Grand Tours Giro d'Italia 2 individual stages (1996, 1998)

Ángel Edo Alsina (born 4 August 1970) is a Spanish former professional road racing cyclist, who competed from 1992 to 2007 as a professional. He competed in the individual road race at the 1992 Summer Olympics.

== Major results ==
1991
1st Stage 1 Vuelta a Castilla y León
1992
1st Stage 1 Bayern Rundfahrt
1st Stage 7a Olympia's Tour
3rd Overall Vuelta a Castilla y León
1993
1st Stage 4 Vuelta a Castilla y León
3rd Clásica de Sabiñánigo
6th Trofeo Masferrer
1994
1st Trofeo Masferrer
1st Stage 2 Vuelta a Mallorca
1st Stage 1 Setmana Catalana de Ciclisme
2nd Road race, National Road Championships
7th Overall Vuelta a Andalucía

1st Stage 1

1995
3rd Overall Vuelta a Mallorca
10th Overall Vuelta a Andalucía
1996
1st Stage 5 Giro d'Italia
3rd Circuito de Getxo
6th Clásica de Almería
1997
2nd Circuito de Getxo
9th Subida al Naranco
1998
1st Stage 2 Giro d'Italia
7th Clásica de Almería
1999
3rd Clásica de Almería
2000
Volta ao Algarve

1st Stages 1 & 3

Vuelta a Asturias

1st Stages 3 & 6

Volta a Portugal

1st Stages 3 & 4

1st Stage 3a Troféu Joaquim Agostinho
1st Stage 3 GP Sport Noticias
3rd Overall Volta ao Alentejo

1st Stage 5

3rd Road race, National Road Championships
2001
1st Stage 1 Setmana Catalana de Ciclisme
1st Stage 2 Volta a Portugal
1st Stage 1 GP Sport Noticias
2nd Overall Grande Prémio Jornal de Notícias

1st Stages 1, 2 & 5

7th Subida al Naranco
2002
Vuelta a Castilla y León

1st Stages 2 & 5

Volta a Portugal

1st Stages 2 & 12

Volta ao Alentejo

1st Stages 2 & 4

4th Clásica de Almería
7th Trofeo Luis Puig
10th Overall Vuelta a Murcia

1st Stage 4

2003
1st Stage 1 Volta ao Algarve
1st Stage 5 Vuelta a Asturias
1st Stage 10 Volta a Portugal
10th Clásica de Almería
2004
1st Stage 5 Setmana Catalana de Ciclisme
1st Stage 2 Troféu Joaquim Agostinho
7th GP Villafranca de Ordizia
2005
6th Trofeo Calvià
2006
1st Stage 1 Vuelta a Castilla y León
4th Circuito de Getxo
