= Jean-Michel Tessier =

French cyclist

Personal information
- Born: 22 December 1977 (age 48) Nouméa, France

Cycling career
- Sport: Cycling
- Current team: Retired
- Disciplines: Road, track
- Role: Rider

Amateur team
- 1998: Française des Jeux (stagiaire)

Professional teams
- 1999–2000: Française des Jeux
- 2001–2002: Cofidis
- 2003: Marlux–Wincor Nixdorf
- 2004: Oktos

Jean-Michel Tessier (born 22 December 1977) is a French former cyclist. He rode in the 2000 Giro d'Italia, but did not finish.

== Major results ==
1998
1st Overall Mi-Août en Bretagne
1st Six Days of Nouméa (with Robert Sassone)
2000
1st Stage 1A Tour de l'Ain
4th Paris–Bourges
2001
1st Grand Prix de la Ville de Lillers
1st Six Days of Nouméa (with Robert Sassone)
1st National Madison Championships (with Robert Sassone)
3rd Kampioenschap van Vlaanderen
6th Overall Circuit de Lorraine

1st Stage 2

2002
1st Six Days of Nouméa (with Adriano Baffi)
1st National Madison Championships (with Robert Sassone)
1st National Points Race Championships
5th Overall Tour du Limousin
8th Grand Prix d'Isbergues
2003
1st Six Days of Nouméa (with Robert Sassone)
7th Grand Prix d'Isbergues
2004
10th Grand Prix de Denain
