= Kim Jung-mo (cyclist) =

South Korean cyclist

Personal information
- Born: 1 June 1974 (age 52)

Cycling career
- Sport: Cycling

Kim Jung-mo (born 1 June 1974) is a South Korean cyclist. He competed in the men's team pursuit at the 1996 Summer Olympics.
