= Cycling at the 1996 Summer Olympics – Men's individual pursuit =

Cycling at the Olympics

Men's individual pursuit at the Games of the XXVI Olympiad
- Venue: Stone Mountain Park Velodrome
- Date: 24 July 1996 (qualifying round & quarterfinals); 25 July 1996 (semifinals); 26 July 1996 (final)
- Competitors: 18 from 18 nations

Medalists
1st place, gold medalist(s)		Andrea Collinelli	Italy
2nd place, silver medalist(s)		Philippe Ermenault	France
3rd place, bronze medalist(s)		Bradley McGee	Australia

These are the official results of the Men's Individual Pursuit at the 1996 Summer Olympics in Atlanta, United States.

== Medalists ==
Gold:	Silver:	Bronze:
Andrea Collinelli (ITA)	Philippe Ermenault (FRA)	Bradley McGee (AUS)

== Results ==
=== Qualifying round ===
Rank	Cyclist	Time	Notes
1	Andrea Collinelli (ITA)	4:19.699	Q
2	Philippe Ermenault (FRA)	4:21.295	Q
3	Aleksey Markov (RUS)	4:27.074	Q
4	Juan Martínez (ESP)	4:27.909	Q
5	Bradley McGee (AUS)	4:27.954	Q
6	Heiko Szonn (GER)	4:29.931	Q
7	Walter Perez (ARG)	4:30.715	Q
8	Andriy Yatsenko (UKR)	4:30.751	Q
9	Kent Bostick (USA)	4:33.008	
10	Artūras Kasputis (LTU)	4:33.748	
11	Graeme Obree (GBR)	4:34.297	
12	Robert Karśnicki (POL)	4:35.193	
13	Gary Anderson (NZL)	4:36.913	
14	Vadim Kravchenko (KAZ)	4:37.212	
15	David George (RSA)	4:35.193	
16	Phillip Collins (IRL)	4:41.207	
	Jukka Heinikainen (FIN)	OVT	
	Peter Pieters (NED)	OVT	

=== Quarter-finals ===
Heat	Rank	Cyclist	Times
1	1	Bradley McGee (AUS)	4:24.943
1	2	Juan Martínez (ESP)	4:28.310
2	1	Aleksey Markov (RUS)	4:24.828
2	2	Heiko Szonn (GER)	4:31.583
3	1	Philippe Ermenault (FRA)	4:22.826
3	2	Walter Perez (ARG)	OVT
4	1	Andrea Collinelli (ITA)	4:19.153
4	2	Andriy Yatsenko (UKR)	OVT

=== Semi-finals ===
Heat	Rank	Cyclist	Time
1	1	Philippe Ermenault (FRA)	4:24.082
1	2	Aleksey Markov (RUS)	4:26.828
2	1	Andrea Collinelli (ITA)	4:22.775
2	2	Bradley McGee (AUS)	4:26.121

=== Final ===
Rank	Cyclist	Time
1	Andrea Collinelli (ITA)	4:20.893
2	Philippe Ermenault (FRA)	4:22.714
