= Olympic record progression track cycling – Men's individual pursuit =

This is an overview of the progression of the Olympic track cycling record of the men's 4000 m individual pursuit, as recognised by the Union Cycliste Internationale (UCI).

The men's 4000-metre individual pursuit was introduced at the 1964 Summer Olympics and was discontinued after the 2008 Summer Olympics. The UCI list the first Olympic record as of 1992 although the event had already been contested at several Olympic Games before.

== Progression ==
| Time | Cyclists | Location | Track | Date | Meet | Ref |
|---|---|---|---|---|---|---|
| 4'57"48* | Tiemen Groen (NED) | Tokyo (JPN) | | 16 October 1964 | 1964 Summer Olympics; Qualifying | |
| 4'56"64* | Giorgio Ursi (ITA) | Tokyo (JPN) | | 17 October 1964 | 1964 Summer Olympics; Semifinals | |
| 4'40"41* | Xaver Kurmann (SUI) | Mexico City (MEX) | | 17 October 1968 | 1968 Summer Olympics; Qualifying | |
| 4'37"54* | Frey Jensen (DEN) | Mexico City (MEX) | | 17 October 1968 | 1968 Summer Olympics; Quarter finals | |
| 4'34"92* | Robert Dill-Bundi (SUI) | Moscow (USR), Olympic Velodrome | | 23 July 1980 | 1980 Summer Olympics; Quarter finals | |
| 4'32"29* | Robert Dill-Bundi (SUI) | Moscow (USR), Olympic Velodrome | | 24 July 1980 | 1980 Summer Olympics; Semifinals | |
| 4'32"00* | Gintaoutas Umaras (URS) | Seoul (KOR) | | 22 September 1988 | 1988 Summer Olympics; Gold medal race | |
| 4'27"357* | Chris Boardman (GBR) | Barcelona (ESP) | Open air track | 27 July 1992 | 1992 Summer Olympics; Qualifying | |
| 4'24"496 | Chris Boardman (GBR) | Barcelona (ESP) | Open air track | 28 July 1992 | 1992 Summer Olympics; Quarter finals | |
| 4'19"699 | Andrea Collinelli (ITA) | Atlanta (USA) | Open air track | 24 July 1996 | 1996 Summer Olympics; Qualifying | |
| 4'18"972* | Robert Bartko (GER) | Sydney (AUS) | Indoor track | 16 September 2000 | 2000 Summer Olympics; Qualifying | |
| 4'18"515 | Robert Bartko (GER) | Sydney (AUS) | Indoor track | 17 September 2000 | 2000 Summer Olympics; Gold medal race | |
| 4'15"165 | Bradley Wiggins (GBR) | Athens (GRE) | Indoor track | 20 August 2004 | 2004 Summer Olympics; Qualifying | |
| 4'15"031 | Bradley Wiggins (GBR) | Beijing (CHN) | Indoor track | 15 August 2008 | 2008 Summer Olympics; Qualifying | |
| 4'14"982 | Lasse Norman Hansen (DEN) | Rio de Janeiro (BRA) | Indoor track | 14 August 2016 | 2016 Summer Olympics; Omnium | |

† Event formed part of the Omnium, not the stand-alone Individual Pursuit
* Not listed by the UCI as an Olympic record
