= Scott McGrory =

Australian cyclist (born 1969)

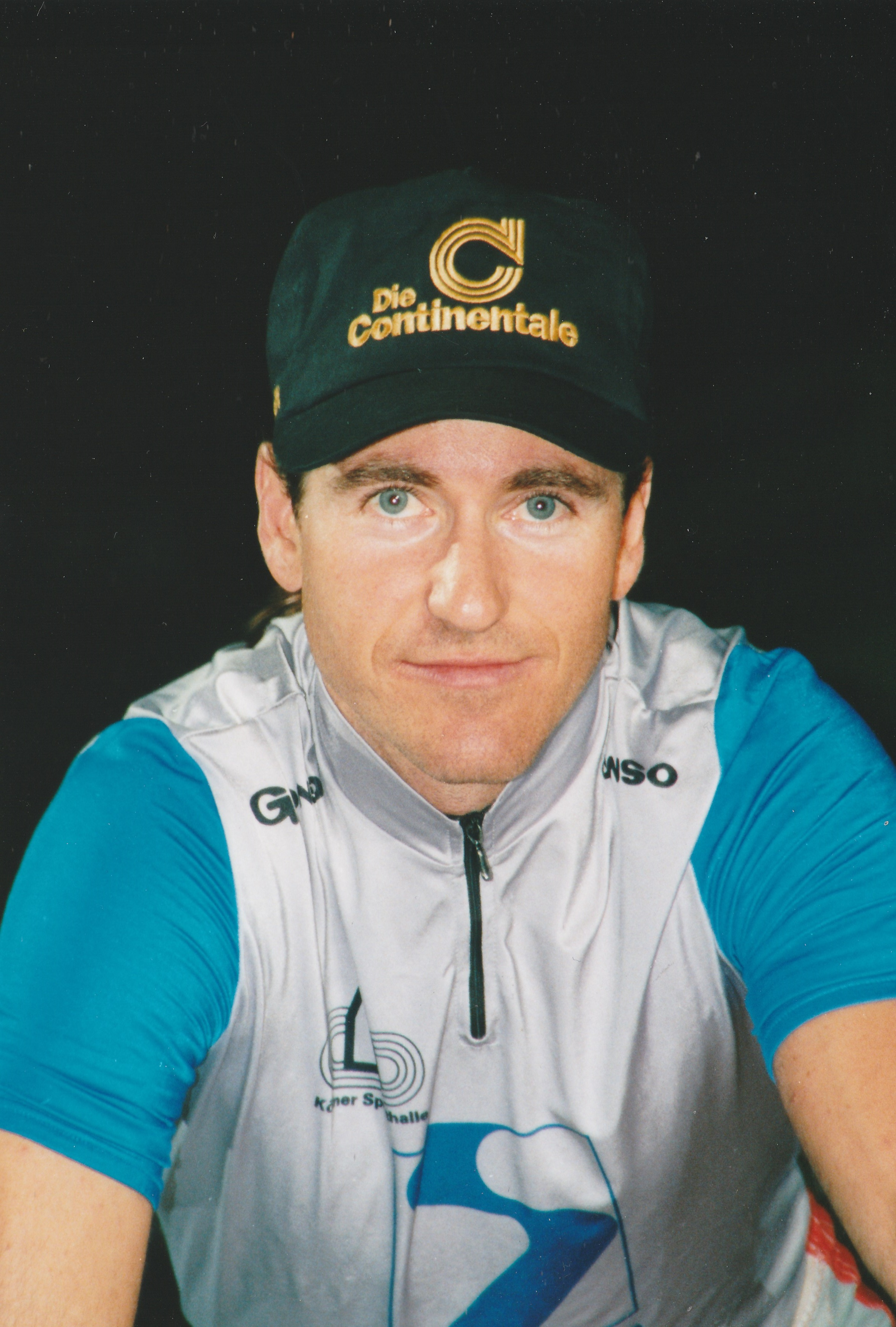
- Scott McGrory (1998)

Personal information
- Full name: Scott Anthony McGrory
- Born: 22 December 1969 (age 56) Walwa, Victoria, Australia

Cycling career
- Sport: Cycling
- Discipline: Track / Road
- Role: Rider
- Rider type: All Rounder

Professional teams
- 1994-1995: Jayco
- 1996-1998: Die Continentale
- 1999-2000: Gerolsteiner
- 2001-2002: Mapei
- 2003: ComNet Senges
Medal record
Representing Australia
Olympic Games
Gold medal – first place	2000 Sydney	Madison
Bronze medal – third place	1988 Seoul	Team pursuit
World Championships
Silver medal – second place	1996 Manchester	Madison

Scott Anthony McGrory OAM (born 22 December 1969) is an Australian former professional racing cyclist. He was an Australian Institute of Sport scholarship holder.

McGrory won a gold medal (with Brett Aitken) in the Madison at the 2000 Summer Olympics in Sydney, a silver in the Madison at the 1996 UCI Track Cycling World Championships in Manchester, and a bronze medal at the 1988 Summer Olympics in the team pursuit.

He represented Australia in the road race events at both the 1998 Commonwealth Games in Kuala Lumpur, Malaysia (8th), and the 2000 Sydney Olympic Games.

== Career ==
Scott started cycling in Albury-Wodonga, later moved to the Gold Coast in Queensland. He represented Queensland, South Australia and Victoria where he now resides.

McGrory won his bronze medal in the team pursuit at the 1988 Summer Olympics at the age of 18.

He turned Professional in 1994 for the Jayco Caravans Team, and won the Australian Professional Road Race Championship that year.

In 1996 he signed with the German Die Continentale team, and spent three seasons there. It was during this period that he started riding the European Winter 'Six-Day' circuit and won the silver medal in the Madison at the World Championships. In 1999–2000 he rode for Team Gerolsteiner and cemented himself as one of the top Six Day riders in the world, and also continued competing as a Road Professional.

After winning the gold medal at the Sydney Olympics, Scott joined the number one ranked team in the world Mapei–Quick-Step for 2001–2002. After the Mapei team finished at the end of 2002 Scott concentrated on the Six Days until injury and illness eventually saw him retire early in 2005.

Scott spent 2007 as the Manager of the Drapac Porsche Cycling Team, in 2008 he joined the Victorian Institute of Sport as a coach.

Scott now works in the media as a commentator and reporter at events such as the Olympic Games, Commonwealth Games, UCI World Championships and Tour de France. He is the host of the Australian television program Full Cycle which broadcasts on the Nine Network and Fox Sports across Australia.

In May 2025 he was named as race director for the men's version of a proposed revival of the Herald Sun Tour.

== Awards ==
1988
3rd Team Pursuit Cycling at the 1988 Summer Olympics
3rd Australian Championship, Madison
2nd Sevenum Criterium, (NED)
3rd Drielandenomloop (NED)
1991
1st Australian Championship, Team Pursuit
3rd Breskens, Amateurs, Breskens (NED)
1992
1st Nouméa Six Days
1st Australian Championship, Team Pursuit
2nd Bendigo Madison (AUS)
1993
1st Australian Championship, Points Race
1994
1st Stage 18 Fresca Classic (USA)
1st Stage 12 Herald Sun Tour (AUS)
1st Stage 1 Tour des Pyrénées - Vuelta a los Pirineos (FRA)
1st Stage 2 Tour des Pyrénées - Vuelta a los Pirineos (FRA)
1st Australian Professional Road Championship
3rd Australian Open Road Championship
1995
1st Stage 5 Herald Sun Tour (AUS)
1st National Championship, Track, Madison, Elite, Australia
1st Stage 3 White Pages Tour (AUS)
2nd Australian Road Championship
1996
3rd Track World Cup, Madison Cottbus (GER)
1st Dortmund (GER)
2nd Overall Classification Geelong Bay Classic Series
1st Stage 2 Bay Classic Series, Port Arlington
3rd Stage 5 Bay Cycling Classic, Torquay
2nd Stage 6 Bay Cycling Classic, Geelong
2nd Madison 1996 World Championships
2nd Australian Championship, Madison
3rd Bendigo Madison (AUS)
1997
2nd US Pro Championship Philadelphia (USA)
1st Alsfeld (GER)
1st Sindelfingen (GER)
1st Hennesee-Rundfahrt (GER)
3rd General Classification Herald Sun Tour (AUS)
1st Stage 15 Herald Sun Tour (AUS)
1st Nordhorn (GER)
1st Sindelfingen (GER)
2nd Stage 1 Hofbrau Cup, Gärtringen (GER)
3rd Stage 6 Tour of Japan, Tokyo (JPN)
1998
1st Dortmund (GER)
1st Aachen (GER)
3rd Dortmund, Six Days (GER)
3rd Leipzig, Six Days (GER)
3rd Zürich, Six Days (SUI)
4th US Pro Championship Philadelphia (USA)
2nd Stage 1 Herald Sun Tour, Bendigo (AUS)
3rd Stage 3 Herald Sun Tour, Warrnambool (AUS)
2nd Stage 8 Herald Sun Tour, Mount Hotham (AUS)
8th Commonwealth Games Road Race Kuala Lumpur (MAS)
1999
1st Gent Six Days (BEL)
1st Track World Cup, Madison Fiorenzuola d' Arda (ITA)
3rd München, Six Days (GER)
2nd Zürich, Six Days (SUI)
1st Stage 5 Bayern Rundfahrt (GER)
1st Points Classification Bayern Rundfahrt (GER)
3rd Scheinfeld (GER)
2000
1st Madison Cycling at the 2000 Summer Olympics
3rd Berlin, Six Days (GER)
3rd Bremen, Six Days (GER)
2nd Gent, Six Days (BEL)
2nd Stage 5 Circuit Cycliste Sarthe, Sablé sur Sarthe (FRA)
2001
1st Aguascalientes, Six Days (MEX)
1st Amsterdam, Six Days (NED)
1st Bremen, Six Days (GER)
1st Gent, Six Days (BEL)
1st Zürich, Six Days (SUI)
1st Bendigo International Madison (AUS)
3rd München, Six Days (GER)
3rd Stuttgart, Six Days (GER)
3rd Fiorenzuola d' Arda, Six Days (ITA)
2nd Heilbronn (GER)
2nd Ulm (GER)
2002
1st München, Six Days (GER)
1st Copenhagen, Six Days (DEN)
1st Fiorenzuola d' Arda, Six Days (ITA)
1st Stage 5 Geelong Bay Classic Series (AUS)
1st Bendigo International Madison (AUS)
1st Einhausen - Entega GP (GER)
1st Michelstadt (GER)
1st Bochum (GER)
1st Gladbeck (GER)
2nd Stuttgart, Six Days (GER)
2nd Torino, Six Days (ITA)
2nd Berlin, Six Days (GER)
2nd Bremen, Six Days (GER)
3rd Amsterdam, Six Days (NED)
3rd Gütersloh (GER)
3rd Köln-Longerich (b) (GER)
3rd Moscow Track World Cup, Madison (RUS)
2003
1st Stuttgart, Six Days (GER)
1st Torino, Six Days (ITA)
1st Düsseldorf (GER)
1st Michelstadt (GER)
1st Meckenbeuren (GER)
2nd München, Six Days (GER)
2nd Fiorenzuola d' Arda, Six Days (ITA)
2nd Osnabrück (GER)
3rd Dortmund, Six Days (GER)
3rd Amsterdam, Six Days (NED)
3rd Bremen, Six Days (GER)
3rd Gütersloh (GER)
3rd Köln-Longerich (GER)
2004
1st Dortmund, Six Days (GER)
1st München, Six Days (GER)
3rd Amsterdam, Six Days (NED)
1st Bolanden-Pfalz (GER)
1st Meckenbeuren (GER)
1st Einhausen - Entega GP (GER)
1st Bolanden-Pfalz (GER)
2nd Bottrop-Kirchhellen (GER)
3rd Nordhorn (GER)
3rd Unnaer Sparkassen Cup (GER)
2005
1st München, Six Days (GER)
4th Gent, Six Days (BEL)
5th Dortmund, Six Days (GER)
5th Amsterdam, Six Days (NED)
3rd Bendigo International Madison (AUS)

== See also ==
- Cycling at the 1988 Summer Olympics
- UCI Track Cycling World Championships - Men's Madison
- Cycling at the 2000 Summer Olympics – Men's Madison
