= Christophe Capelle =

French cyclist (born 1967)

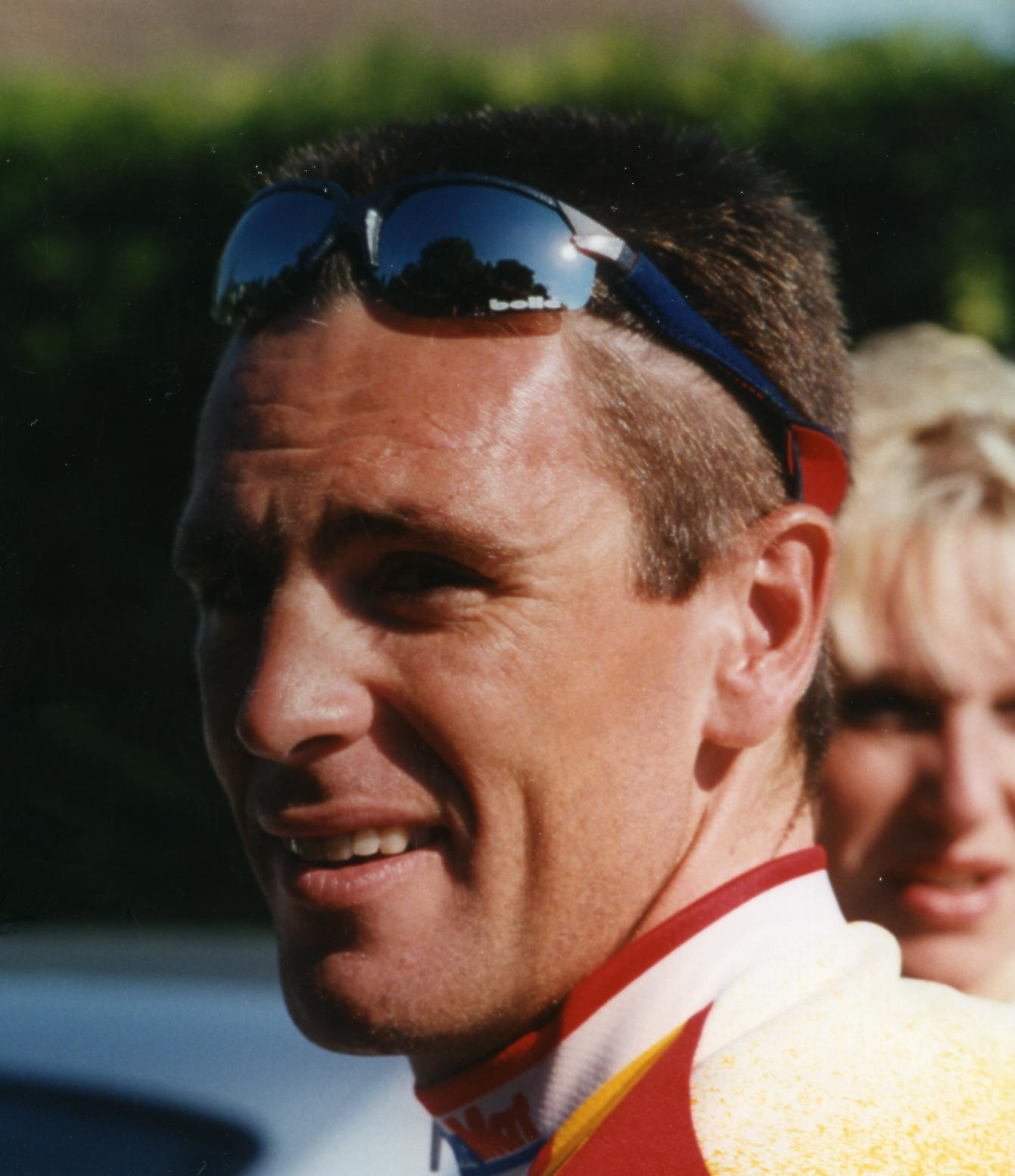
- Capelle in 1996

Personal information
- Full name: Christophe Capelle
- Born: 15 August 1967 (age 59) Compiègne, France

Cycling career
- Sport: Cycling
- Disciplines: Road and track
- Role: Rider

Professional teams
- 1991–1995: Z
- 1996: Force Sud
- 1996: Aubervilliers 93
- 1997–1998: Cofidis
- 1999–2002: BigMat–Auber 93

Major wins
- Hessen-Rundfahrt (1990); French National Road Race Champion (2000)

Christophe Capelle (born 15 August 1967) is a French former racing cyclist.

Capelle won a gold medal for France in the 4000-meter team pursuit at the 1996 Summer Olympics in Atlanta, riding alongside Philippe Ermenault, Jean-Michel Monin, and Francis Moreau. In 2000, he represented France in the points race and Madison events, finishing outside the medals in both events. Capelle also competed in the Olympic road race, but failed to finish.

Capelle also raced for the Big Mat–Auber 93 team at the 1999 Tour de France, completing the race in 115th place.

== Career achievements ==
=== Major results ===
1988
3rd Bordeaux-Caudéran
3rd Grand Prix de France
1990
1st Overall Hessen-Rundfahrt
7th Overall Tour du Limousin
1991
1st Stage 7 Tour Méditerranéen
4th Paris–Brussels
7th Kuurne–Brussels–Kuurne
10th Dwars door België
1992
2nd Kuurne–Brussels–Kuurne
8th Overall Paris–Bourges
1993
6th Overall 4 Jours de Dunkerque
7th Paris–Camembert
8th Road race, National Road Championships
1994
3rd Overall Tour d'Armorique
3rd Road race, National Road Championships
5th Circuit des Frontières
1995
1st Stage 3 Circuit Cycliste Sarthe
1st Stage 4 Tour du Limousin
4th Tour de Vendée
5th Classic Haribo
6th Paris–Brussels
1996
1st Stage 1 Critérium International
1st Stage 2a Tour de Picardie
4th Tour du Haut Var
1997
6th Classic Haribo
1998
1st Stage 7 Paris–Nice
10th Dwars door België
2000
1st Road race, National Road Championships
1st Bordeaux-Caudéran
2001
4th GP de Denain
7th GP de Villers-Cotterêts
2002
7th Overall Tour of Qatar

=== Grand Tour general classification results timeline ===
Grand Tour	1991	1992	1993	1994	1995	1996	1997	1998	1999	2000	2001
Giro d'Italia	DNF	106	—	—	—	—	—	—	—	—	—
Tour de France	—	—	115	DNF	DNF	DNF	—	—	115	—	123
Vuelta a España	—	—	—	—	—	—	—	DNF	—	—	—

Legend
DSQ	Disqualified
DNF	Did not finish
