= Heiko Szonn =

German cyclist

Personal information
- Born: 23 June 1976 (age 50) Brandenburg, East Germany

Cycling career
- Sport: Cycling

Heiko Szonn (born 23 June 1976) is a German cyclist. He competed in two events at the 1996 Summer Olympics.
