= Robert Slippens =

Dutch cyclist (born 1975)

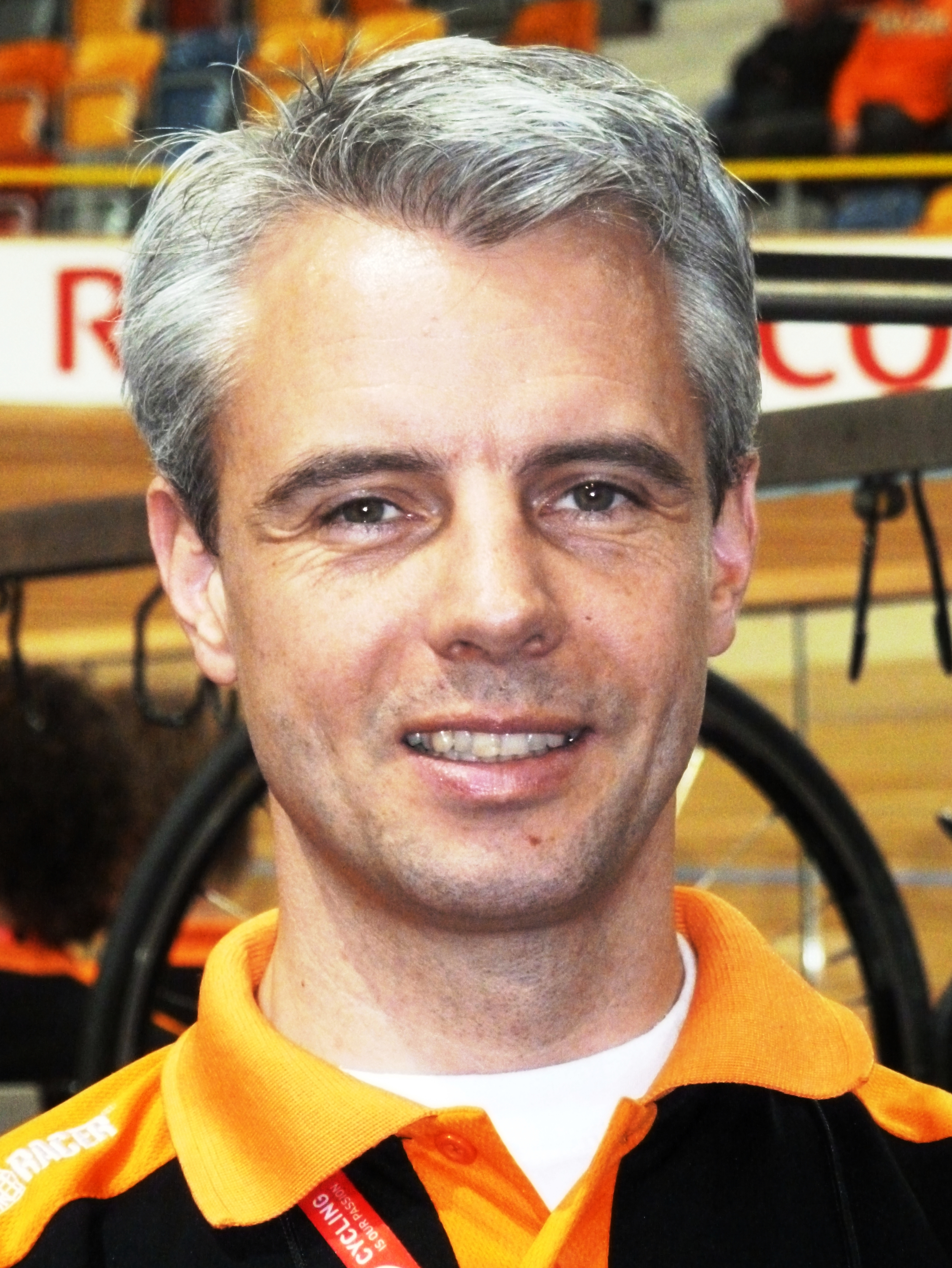

Personal information
- Born: 3 May 1975 (age 51) Opmeer, Netherlands
- Height: 1.74 m (5 ft 9 in)
- Weight: 70 kg (154 lb)

Cycling career
- Sport: Cycling
- Current team: Retired
- Disciplines: Track, road
- Role: Rider
- Rider type: Endurance

Professional teams
- 1999–2008: Axa Cycling Teamet–Gazelle
- 2009: AA Drink
Medal record
Representing Netherlands
Men's track cycling
World Championships
Silver medal – second place	2004 Melbourne	Scratch
Silver medal – second place	2005 Los Angeles	Madison
Bronze medal – third place	2004 Melbourne	Madison]]
European Championships
Gold medal – first place	2002 Amsterdam	Madison
Silver medal – second place	2003 Amsterdam	Madison

Robert Slippens (born 3 May 1975) is a Dutch former professional racing cyclist.

Slippens represented the Netherlands at three different Summer Olympics. He made his Olympic debut at the 1996 Summer Olympics in Atlanta where he participated in the four kilometer team pursuit alongside Jarich Bakker, Richard Rozendaal and Peter Schep. The team finished in twelfth position. Four years later at the 2000 Summer Olympics in Sydney, he took part in the same event, but with different riders. Bakker and Rozendaal were replaced by Jens Mouris, John den Braber, and Wilco Zuijderwijk, while Schep and Slippens stayed. Although the team consisted of five riders, only four were allowed on the track at the same time. They qualified for the quarter-finals, where they lost to the Ukrainian team, resulting in a seventh place overall.

In Sydney, Slippens also started at the madison, which he entered with his teammate Danny Stam. Together they have entered many Six Day Cycling Events in which they have ended up on the podium. They did not reach the podium at the Olympics but finished in eighth position. At the 2004 Summer Olympics in Athens, Stam and Slippens qualified for the madison again, but finished in fourteenth place, a lap behind the winners.

== See also ==
- List of Dutch Olympic cyclists
