= Michael McCarthy (cyclist) =

American cyclist

Personal information
- Born: June 20, 1968 (age 58) Brooklyn, New York, U.S.
- Height: 1.88 m (6 ft 2 in)
- Weight: 82 kg (181 lb)

Sport
- Sport: Cycling
- Club: Sunkyong/Saturn
Medal record
Representing the United States
Track World Championships
Bronze medal – third place	1990 Maebashi	Individual pursuit, amateurs
Gold medal – first place	1992 Valencia	Individual pursuit
Pan American Games
Gold medal – first place	1987 Indianapolis	Team pursuit

Michael Brian McCarthy (born June 20, 1968) is an American former road and track cyclist who was active between 1986 and 1998. On track, he won one gold and one bronze medals in the individual pursuit at the world championships in 1990 and 1992. He competed at the 1988 and 1996 Summer Olympics in the 4 km team pursuit and finished in ninth and sixth place, respectively. On the road, he won two stages of the Redlands Bicycle Classic (1995, 1997), Tour de Taiwan (2×1995) and Tour of Japan (2×1998).

In 1990, McCarthy was selected as USA Cycling Athlete of the Year. In 2010, he was inducted to the United States Bicycling Hall of Fame.

Born and raised in New York, he then moved to Mill Valley, California, and started racing competitively in 1982. He retired due to an Epstein–Barr virus infection and later worked as a sales trader in San Francisco.
