= Andriy Yatsenko (cyclist) =

Ukrainian cyclist

Personal information
- Born: 7 May 1973 (age 53)

Cycling career
- Sport: Cycling

Andriy Yatsenko (born 7 May 1973) is a Ukrainian cyclist. He competed in two events at the 1996 Summer Olympics.
