= 1993 UCI Track Cycling World Championships – Men's individual pursuit =

1993 UCI Track Cycling World Championships – Men's individual pursuit was part of the 1993 UCI Track Cycling World Championships.

In 1993 the amateur 4 km and professional 5 km pursuit events were combined in a single championship run over 4 km. The format was different also, with the top 4 from the qualifying round going directly to the semi-finals, and the two winners of those races meeting in the final for silver and gold.

== Qualifying ==
       1. Philippe Ermenault, France,          4:23.283 world record  
       2. Graeme Obree, Britain,               4:24.321
       3. Chris Boardman, Britain,             4:24.719
       4. Shaun Wallace, Britain,              4:26.832
       5. Jens Lehmann, Germany,               4:27.518
       6. Roman Saprykin, Russia,              4:29.306
       7. Torsten Schmidt, Germany,            4:29.785
       8. Andreas Bach, Germany,               4:29.892
       9. Steve Hegg, U.S.,                    4:32.170
       10. Vadim Kravchenko, Kazakhstan,       4:32.215
       11. Eddy Seigneur, France,              4:33.953
       12. Jan-Bo Petersen, Denmark,           4:33.991
       13. Michael Sandsted, Denmark,          4:34.362
       14. Jesper Nielsen, Denmark,            4:34.461
       15. Steffen Kjaergaard, Norway,         4:34.462
       16. Francis Moreau, France,             4:34.927
       17. Serguei Matveev, Ukraine,           4:35.831
       18. Glenn McLeay, New Zealand,          4:36.101
       19. Friedrich Berein, Austria,          4:36.310
       20. Gunter De Winne, Belgium,           4:36.712
       21. Bruno Risi, Switzerland,            4:37.403
       22. Brian Walton, Canada,               4:38.244
       23. Ryszard Dawidowicz, Poland,         4:38.284
       24. Robert Karsnicki, Poland,           4:38.375
       25. Bogdan Bondarev, Ukraine,           4:38.698
       26. Fabio Placanica, Argentina,         4:39.358
       27. Jonathan Garrido, Spain,            4:39.531
       28. Noriyuki Iijima, Japan,             4:39.724
       29. Richard Rozendaal, Netherlands,         4:40.304
       30. George Portelanos, Greece,          4:40.350
       31. Alexander Smirnov, Belarus,         4:40.472
       32. Glen Thomson, New Zealand,          4:41.957
       33. Edgardo Simón, Argentina,           4:42.150
       34. Yasuhiro Ando, Japan,               4:42.460
       35. Jukka Heinikanen, Finland,          4:42.803
       36. Carlos Suarez, Colombia,            4:42.974
       37. Gianni Patuelli, Italy,             4:44.461
       38. Viktor Kunz, Switzerland,           4:44.898
       39. Marcel Dunkel, Switzerland,         4:46.125
       40. Alberny Vargas, Colombia,           4:48.153
       41. Ho-Sung Cho, Korea,                 4:48.480
       42. Stefano Casagranda, Italy,          4:48.572
       43. Esteban Lopez, Colombia,            4:48.773
       44. Patrick van Dijken, Netherlands,        4:48.880
       45. Jose Jarque, Spain,                 4:49.450
       46. Wayne Burgess, South Africa,        4:49.560
       47. Christian Selin, Finland,           4:50.548
       48. Henning Orre, Norway,               4:53.246
       49. Sergey Lavrinenko, Kazakhstan,      4:53.784

== Semi-finals ==
- Ermenault beat Wallace
- Obree beat Boardman

== Final ==
- Obree beat Ermenault
