= Philippe Ermenault =

French cyclist

Personal information
- Full name: Philippe Ermenault
- Born: 29 April 1969 (age 57) Flixecourt, France

Cycling career
- Sport: Cycling
- Discipline: Track
- Role: Rider
- Rider type: Pursuiter
Medal record
Representing France
Men's track cycling
Olympic Games
Gold medal – first place	1996 Atlanta	Team pursuit
Silver medal – second place	1996 Atlanta	Individual pursuit
World Championships
Gold medal – first place	1997 Perth	Individual pursuit
Gold medal – first place	1998 Bordeaux	Individual pursuit
Silver medal – second place	1993 Hamar	Individual pursuit
Silver medal – second place	1996 Manchester	Team pursuit
Silver medal – second place	1999 Berlin	Team pursuit
Bronze medal – third place	1997 Perth	Team pursuit

Philippe Ermenault (born 29 April 1969) is a French former track cyclist. Ermenault was twice world champion in individual pursuit and Olympic champion as part of the France team in the team pursuit. He is the father of racing cyclist Corentin Ermenault.

== Results ==
Date	Placing	Event	Competition	Location	Country
1992	1	Individual pursuit	National championships		France
1993	1	Individual pursuit	National championships		France
19 August 1993	2nd place, silver medalist(s)	Individual pursuit	World Championships	Hamar	Norway
1994	1	Individual pursuit	National championships		France
1995	1	Individual pursuit	National championships		France
June 1995	3	Individual pursuit	World Cup	Cottbus	Germany
July 1995	2	Individual pursuit	World Cup	Adelaide	Australia
July 1995	1	Individual pursuit	World Cup	Tokyo	Japan
1996	1	Individual pursuit	National championships		France
1996	1	Points race	National championships		France
25 July 1996	2nd place, silver medalist(s)	Individual pursuit	Olympic Games	Atlanta	United States
27 July 1996	1st place, gold medalist(s)	Team pursuit	Olympic Games	Atlanta	United States
31 August 1996	2nd place, silver medalist(s)	Team pursuit	World Championships	Manchester	United Kingdom
1997	1	Individual pursuit	National championships		France
1997	1	Points race	National championships		France
28 August 1997	1st place, gold medalist(s)	Individual pursuit	World Championships	Perth	Australia
30 August 1997	3rd place, bronze medalist(s)	Team pursuit	World Championships	Perth	Australia
July 1997	2	Individual pursuit	World Cup	Athens	Greece
July 1997	3	Team pursuit	World Cup	Athens	Greece
1998	2	Individual pursuit	National championships		France
13 June 1998	3	Points race	World Cup	Berlin	Germany
26 August 1998	1st place, gold medalist(s)	Individual pursuit	World Championships	Bordeaux	France
1999	1	Individual pursuit	National championships		France
20 October 1999	2nd place, silver medalist(s)	Team pursuit	World Championships	Berlin	Germany
22 May 1999	1	Team pursuit	World Cup	Mexico City	Mexico
29 May 1999	2	Team pursuit	World Cup	Frisco	United States
2000	3	Individual pursuit	National championships		France
2000	3	Team pursuit	National championships		France
20 May 2000	3	Team pursuit	World Cup	Moscow	Russia
16 June 2000	3	Individual pursuit	World Cup	Mexico City	Mexico
17 June 2000	3	Team pursuit	World Cup	Mexico City	Mexico
