= Olympic record progression track cycling – Men's 1 km time trial =

This is an overview of the progression of the Olympic track cycling record of the men's 1 km time trial as recognised by the Union Cycliste Internationale (UCI).

The track time trial was already at the 1896 Summer Olympics, but it was the only time the event was held over one-third of a kilometre rather than one kilometer. The men's 1 km time trial was introduced at the 1928 Summer Olympics and was discontinued after the 2004 Summer Olympics. Strangely, the list of Olympic records from the UCI starts in 1980.

== Progression ==
Time	Cyclists	Location	Track	Date	Meet
1'14"2*	Willy Hansen (DEN)	Amsterdam (NED), Olympic Stadium		August 1928	1928 Summer Olympics
1'13"0*	Dunc Gray (AUS)	Pasadena (USA), Rose Bowl		1 August 1932	1932 Summer Olympics
1'12"0*	Arie van Vliet (NED)	Berlin (GER), Olympic Cycling Stadium		8 September 1936	1936 Summer Olympics
1'11"1*	Russell Mockridge (AUS)	Helsinki (FIN)		31 July 1952	1952 Summer Olympics
1'09"8*	Leandro Faggin (ITA)	Melbourne (AUS)		6 December 1956	1956 Summer Olympics
1'07"27*	Sante Gaiardoni (ITA)	Rome (ITA), Olympic Velodrome		26 September 1960	1960 Summer Olympics
1'03"91*	Pierre Trentin (FRA)	Mexico City (MEX), Olympic Velodrome		17 October 1968	1968 Summer Olympics
1'02"955	Lothar Thoms (RDA)	Moscow (URS)	Indoor track	22 July 1980	1980 Summer Olympics
1'02"712	Florian Rousseau (FRA)	Atlanta (USA)	Open air track	24 July 1996	1996 Summer Olympics
1'01"609	Jason Queally (GBR)	Sydney (AUS)	Indoor track	16 September 2000	2000 Summer Olympics
1'01"224	Shane Kelly (AUS)	Athens (GRE)	Indoor track	20 August 2004	2004 Summer Olympics
1'01"186	Stefan Nimke (GER)	Athens (GRE)	Indoor track	20 August 2004	2004 Summer Olympics
1'00"896	Arnaud Tournant (FRA)	Athens (GRE)	Indoor track	20 August 2004	2004 Summer Olympics
1'00"711	Chris Hoy (GBR)	Athens (GRE)	Indoor track	20 August 2004	2004 Summer Olympics

* Not listed by the UCI as an Olympic record
