= Bernardo González =

Spanish cyclist

Personal information
- Born: 7 September 1969 Jumilla, Spain
- Died: 6 October 2000 (aged 31)

Cycling career
- Sport: Cycling

Bernardo González (7 September 1969 – 6 October 2000) was a Spanish cyclist. He competed at the 1988 Summer Olympics and the 1996 Summer Olympics.
