= Nikolay Kuznetsov (cyclist) =

Russian cyclist

Personal information
- Full name: Nikolay Aleksandrovich Kuznetsov; Николай Александрович Кузнецов
- Born: 20 July 1973 (age 53) Soviet Union
- Height: 1.80 m (5 ft 11 in)
- Weight: 73 kg (161 lb)

Cycling career
- Sport: Cycling
- Discipline: Track

Professional team
- 1998: Lokosphinx
Medal record
Representing Russia
Men's track cycling
Olympic Games
Silver medal – second place	1996 Atlanta	Team pursuit

Nikolay Aleksandrovich Kuznetsov (Russian: Николай Александрович Кузнецов; born 20 July 1973) is a retired Russian professional track bicycle racer. He won a silver medal at the 1996 Summer Olympics. His sister is tennis player Svetlana Kuznetsova.

== Palmares ==
1996
(silver) , Olympic Games - Team Pursuit
