= Massimo Strazzer =

Italian cyclist

Personal information
- Full name: Massimo Strazzer
- Born: 17 August 1969 (age 57) Zevio, Italy
- Height: 1.77 m (5 ft 9 1/2 in)
- Weight: 68 kg (150 lb; 10 st 10 lb)

Cycling career
- Sport: Cycling
- Discipline: Road
- Role: Rider
- Rider type: Sprinter

Professional teams
- 1991–1993: Jolly Componibili–Club 88
- 1994–1995: Navigare–Blue Storm
- 1996: Brescialat
- 1997: Roslotto–ZG Mobili
- 1998: Cantina Tollo–Alexia Alluminio
- 1999: Mobilvetta Design–Northwave
- 2000: Alessio
- 2001: Mobilvetta Design–Formaggi Trentini
- 2002–2003: Phonak
- 2004: Saunier Duval–Prodir

Major wins
- Grand Tours Giro d'Italia Points Classification (2001) Intergiro Classification (2001, 2002)

Massimo Strazzer (born 17 August 1969) is a former Italian professional cyclist. The highlight of his career came with his victory in the Points Classification at the 2001 Giro d'Italia. He retired from cycling in 2004.

== Major results ==
1992
1st Stage 1 Settimana Internazionale di Coppi e Bartali
2nd Millemetri del Corso di Mestre
1993
1st Stage 8 Tirreno–Adriatico
2nd Millemetri del Corso di Mestre
10th Trofeo Laigueglia
1994
1st Stages 1, 2 & 4 Volta a Portugal
2nd Millemetri del Corso di Mestre
1995
1st Stage 5 Tour du Vaucluse
1st Stage 7 Volta a Portugal
1996
1st Stage 3a KBC Driedaagse van De Panne-Koksijde
1st Millemetri del Corso di Mestre
7th Gent–Wevelgem
10th E3 Harelbeke
1997
1st Stage 4 Tour Méditerranéen
1st Stages 1 & 3 Vuelta a Murcia
1st Clásica de Almería
1st Millemetri del Corso di Mestre
10th E3 Harelbeke
1998
1st Stage 5 Vuelta Ciclista a la Comunidad Valenciana
1st Prologue & Stage 4a Tour of Sweden
2nd Millemetri del Corso di Mestre
1999
1st Stage 2 Tirreno–Adriatico
1st Stage 2 Tour de Pologne
1st Millemetri del Corso di Mestre
3rd Gran Premio della Costa Etruschi
2000
1st Stage 3 Bayern Rundfahrt
1st Millemetri del Corso di Mestre
2001
1st Millemetri del Corso di Mestre
Giro d'Italia

1st Points classification
1st Intergiro classification
1st Combativity Award

2002
1st Clásica de Almería
1st Stausee Rundfahrt
1st Millemetri del Corso di Mestre
Giro d'Italia

1st Intergiro classification
1st Combativity Award

10th Overall Circuit de la Sarthe

1st Stages 2, 3 & 5

2003
1st Stage 2 Circuit de la Sarthe
1st Stage 3 Bayern Rundfahrt
2nd Clásica de Almería
2nd Millemetri del Corso di Mestre
