= John den Braber =

Dutch cyclist

Personal information
- Born: 16 September 1970 Rotterdam, Netherlands
- Height: 180 cm (5 ft 11 in)
- Weight: 70 kg (154 lb)

Cycling career
- Sport: Cycling
- Disciplines: Road and Track cycling

Professional team
- AXA Professional Cycling Team

John den Braber (born 16 September 1970) is a Dutch cyclist. He competed in the Men's team time trial at the 1992 Summer Olympics, finishing 9th and in the Men's team pursuit at the 2000 Summer Olympics, finishing 7th. He won the Omloop der Kempen in 1992. In 1993 Den Braber became Rotterdam Sportsman of the year.

== See also ==
- List of Dutch Olympic cyclists

Awards
Preceded by Regilio Tuur	Rotterdam Sportsman of the Year; 1993	Succeeded by Regilio Tuur
