= Jarich Bakker =

Dutch cyclist

Personal information
- Full name: Jarich Hendrik Bakker
- Born: 29 March 1974 Leeuwarden, Netherlands
- Height: 194 cm (6 ft 4 in)
- Weight: 83 kg (183 lb)

Cycling career
- Sport: Cycling
- Discipline: Track cycling

Jarich Hendrik Bakker (born 29 March 1974) competed as a track cyclist for the Netherlands at the 1996 Summer Olympics. Born in Leeuwarden, he participated in the men's team pursuit at the 1996 Summer Olympics, finishing 12th.

== See also ==
- List of Dutch Olympic cyclists
