= Eduard Gritsun =

Russian cyclist

Personal information
- Full name: Eduard Vyacheslavovich Gritsun; Эдуард Вячеславович Грицун
- Born: 4 February 1976 (age 50) Rostov-on-Don, Soviet Union

Cycling career
- Sport: Cycling
- Current team: Retired
- Disciplines: Road; Track
- Role: Rider

Professional teams
- 1998: Lokosphinx
- 1999–2000: Gerolsteiner
- 2001: Team Coast
- 2002: Itera
- 2003: Lokomotiv
Medal record
Men's track cycling
Representing Russia
Olympic Games
Silver medal – second place	1996 Atlanta	Team pursuit
World Championships
Bronze medal – third place	1999 Berlin	Team pursuit

Eduard Vyacheslavovich Gritsun (Russian: Эдуард Вячеславович Грицун; born 4 February 1976 in Rostov-on-Don) is a retired Russian professional road bicycle racer.

== Major results ==
1996
1st Stage 5 Volta a la Comunitat Valenciana
2nd Team pursuit, Summer Olympics
3rd Overall Volta a Tarragona
1st Stage 3
1997
1st Overall Volta a Tarragona
2nd Overall Sachsen-Tour
1998
1st Overall Vuelta a Navarra

1st Stages 5 & 6

3rd Time trial, National Road Championships
1999
2nd Overall Hessen-Rundfahrt

1st Stage 2

3rd Team pursuit, UCI Track World Championships
4th Overall Niedersachsen-Rundfahrt
2000
8th GP Rudy Dhaenens
2002
5th Time trial, National Road Championships
5th Circuito de Getxo
9th Clásica de Almería
2003
1st Stage 2 Volta a Tarragona
