= Alexei Markov =

Russian cyclist (born 1979)

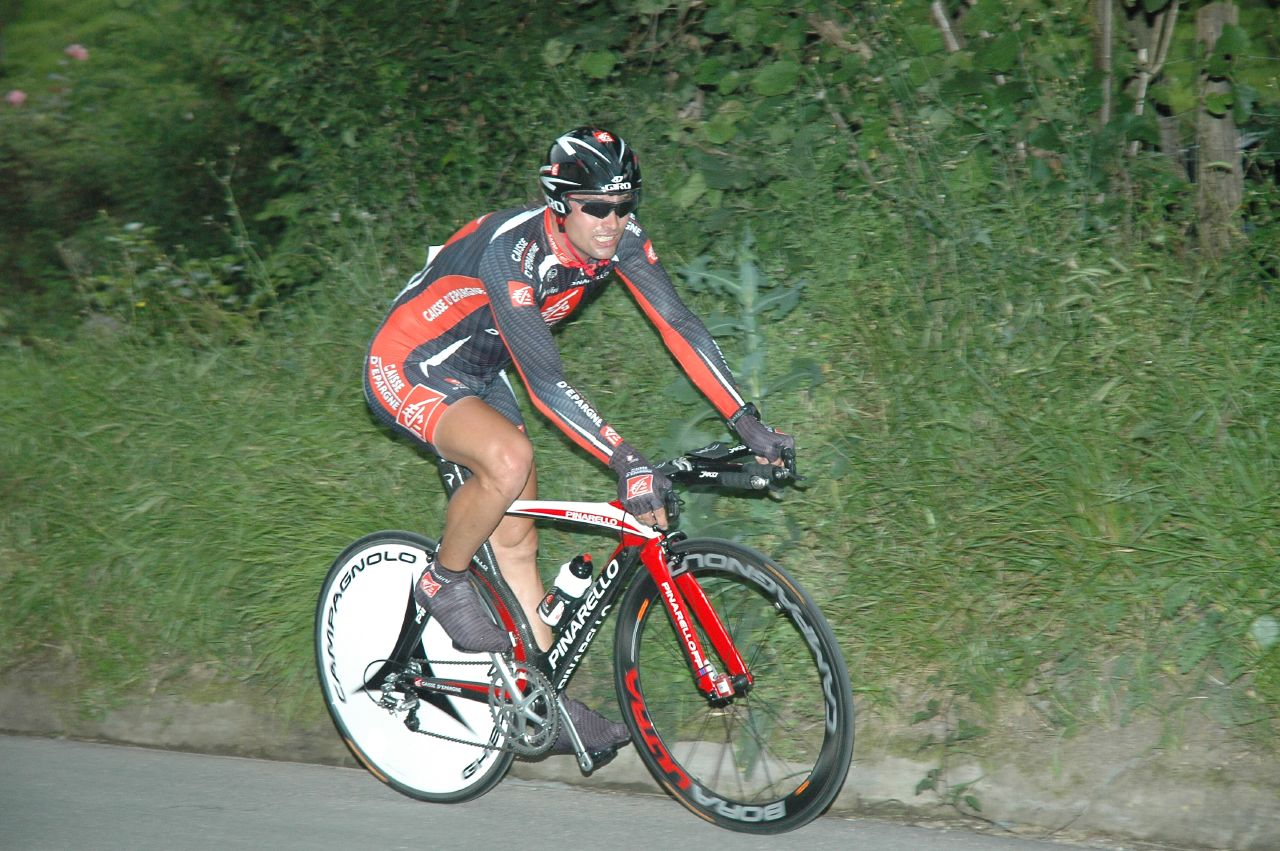

Personal information
- Full name: Alexei Mikhailovich Markov; Алексей Михайлович Марков
- Born: 26 May 1979 (age 47) Moscow, Soviet Union
- Height: 1.81 m (5 ft 11 in)
- Weight: 78 kg (172 lb)

Cycling career
- Sport: Cycling
- Current team: Retired
- Disciplines: Road & Track
- Role: Rider
- Rider type: Sprinter

Amateur team
- 1999–2000: Lokosphinx

Professional teams
- 2001–2002: Itera
- 2003: Lokomotiv
- 2004: Hoop–CCC–Polsat
- 2005: Milaneza–Maia
- 2006–2007: Caisse d'Epargne–Illes Balears
- 2008: Katyusha
- 2009: Team Katusha
- 2012: RusVelo
Medal record
Representing Russia
Men's road bicycle racing
World Championships
Bronze medal – third place	1997 San Sebastián	Junior time trial
Men's track cycling
Olympic Games
Silver medal – second place	1996 Atlanta	Team pursuit
Bronze medal – third place	2000 Sydney	Points race
Bronze medal – third place	2008 Beijing	Madison
World Championships
Silver medal – second place	1997 Perth	Individual pursuit
Silver medal – second place	2011 Apeldoorn	Team pursuit
Bronze medal – third place	1999 Berlin	Team pursuit
Bronze medal – third place	2008 Manchester	Individual pursuit
European Elite Championships
Gold medal – first place	2012 Panevėžys	Team pursuit
Silver medal – second place	2010 Pruszków	Team pursuit

Alexei Mikhailovich Markov (Алексей Михайлович Марков; born 26 May 1979 in Moscow) is a Russian former professional track and road bicycle racer. Standing about 1.81 m tall and weighing around 80–81 kg, Markov was regarded as a versatile rider capable in sprints and time-trials.

During his career, he scored multiple stage victories in European road races, including wins in the Volta ao Algarve, Vuelta a La Rioja, Tour of Sochi, and Tour of China. Concurrently, on the track, he earned medals in team pursuits and points races at both world cup and Olympic events.

After retiring from competitive racing, Markov transitioned into team management and directorial roles. For example, he has served as a sports director for teams like RusVelo, contributing to the sport off the bike as well.

== Major results ==
=== Track ===
1996
2nd Team pursuit, Summer Olympics
1997
UCI World Cup

1st Individual pursuit, Cali
1st Team pursuit, Cali
1st Individual pursuit, Trexlertown
1st Team pursuit, Trexlertown

2nd Individual pursuit, UCI World Championships
1998
UCI World Cup

3rd Individual pursuit, Hyères
3rd Team pursuit, Hyères
3rd Team pursuit, Berlin

1999
UCI World Cup

2nd Individual pursuit, Fiorenzuola d'Arda
3rd Team pursuit, Fiorenzuola d'Arda

3rd Team pursuit, UCI World Championships
2000
UCI World Cup

1st Team pursuit, Moscow
3rd Individual pursuit, Moscow

3rd Points race, Summer Olympics
2001
UCI World Cup

1st Team pursuit, Mexico City
3rd Overall Individual pursuit
3rd Individual pursuit, Szczecin
3rd Individual pursuit, Mexico City

2002
UCI World Cup

1st Team pursuit, Moscow
3rd Individual pursuit, Moscow

2003
1st Team pursuit, Moscow, UCI World Cup
2004
UEC European Championships

1st Omnium
1st Derny

UCI World Cup

3rd Team pursuit, Moscow
3rd Individual pursuit, Moscow

2007
2nd Madison, European Championships (with Nikolai Trussov)
2nd Individual pursuit, Copenhagen, UCI World Cup
2008
UCI World Cup

2nd Individual pursuit, Melbourne
3rd Individual pursuit, Copenhagen

3rd Madison (with Mikhail Ignatiev), Summer Olympics
3rd Individual pursuit, UCI World Championships
2010
UCI World Cup

1st Team pursuit, Pekin
2nd Points race, Pekin
2nd Team pursuit, Melbourne

2nd Team pursuit, UEC European Championships
2011
UCI World Cup

1st Team pursuit, Astana
1st Team pursuit, Pekin

National Championships

1st Madison
1st Team pursuit

2nd Team pursuit, UCI World Championships
2012
1st Team pursuit, UEC European Championships

=== Road ===
1997
3rd Time trial, UCI Junior Road World Championships
1999
1st Stage 1 Vuelta a Navarra
1st Stage 1 Vuelta a Alicante
2000
1st Overall Vuelta a Alicante

1st Stages 1 & 3

1st Stages 1, 3 & 5 Cinturón a Mallorca
2001
2nd Road race, National Road Championships
2nd Overall International Tour of Rhodes
5th Memorial Manuel Galera
2002
1st Stages 2 & 4 Trofeú Joaquim Agostinho
2nd Overall GP CTT Correios de Portugal

1st Stages 3 & 5

8th Memorial Manuel Galera
2003
2nd Overall Gran Premio Mosqueteros-Ruta del Marqués
3rd Overall GP CTT Correios de Portugal
3rd Clásica de Almería
7th Trofeo Cala Millor-Cala Bona
2004
1st Stages 2 & 8 Tour de Normandie
4th Memoriał Andrzeja Trochanowskiego
4th Overall Jadranska Magistrala
2005
1st Overall GP CTT Correios de Portugal

1st Stages 1, 2

1st Stages 2 & 4 GP Internacional do Oeste RTP
1st Stage 1 Trofeú Joaquim Agostinho
1st Stage 3 Volta ao Algarve
7th Overall GP Costa Azul
2006
1st Stage 1 Vuelta a La Rioja
2007
1st Stage 1 (TTT Tour Méditerranéen
2008
1st Stage 3 Grand Prix of Sochi
2009
4th Kampioenschap van Vlaanderen
8th Omloop van het Houtland
9th Nokere-Koerse
10th Paris–Brussels
2010
3rd Overall Tour of Hainan

1st Stage 8

2011
1st Prologue Tour of China
1st Stage 3 Flèche du Sud
3rd ProRace Berlin
