= Jean-Michel Monin =

French cyclist (born 1967)

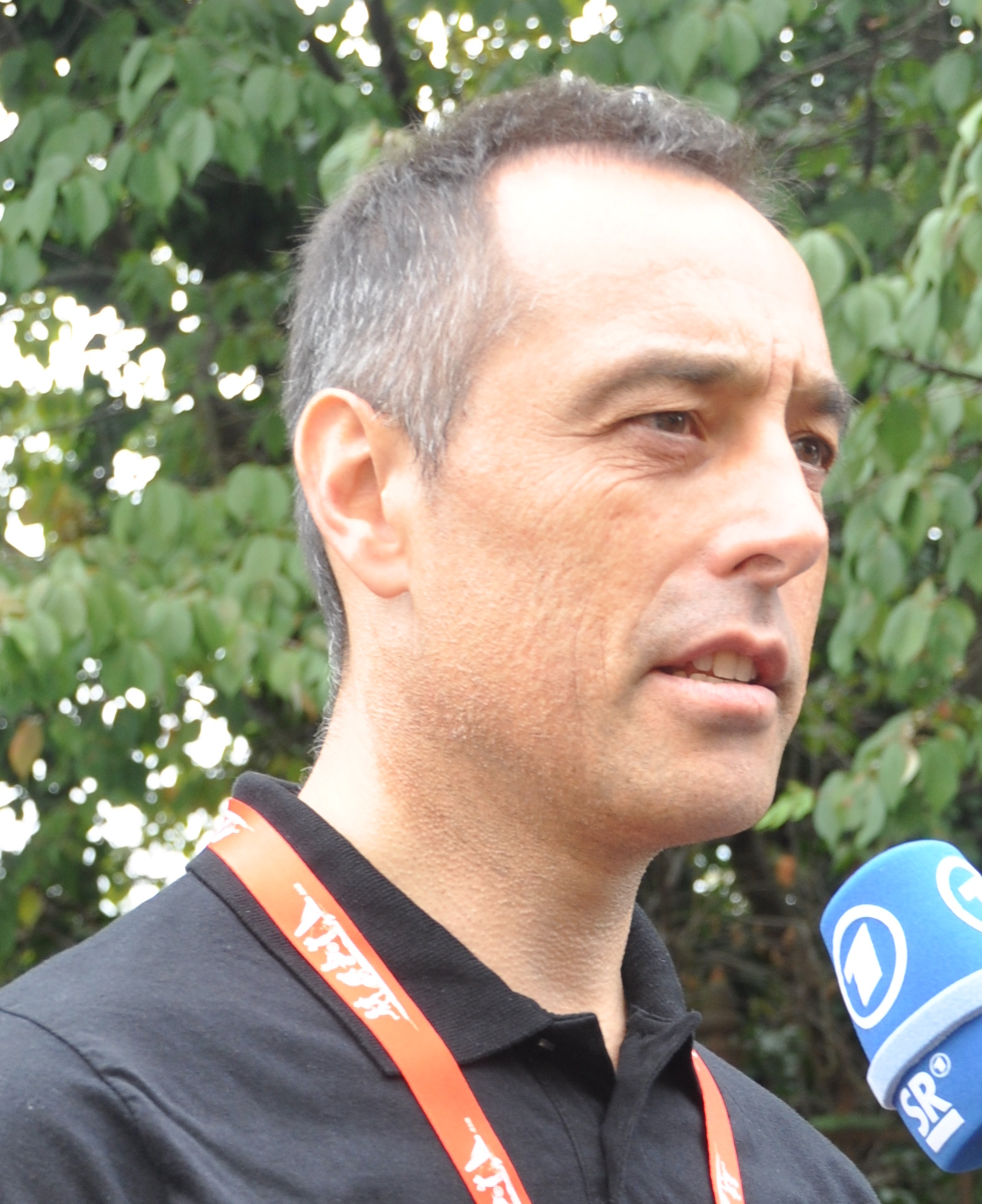

Personal information
- Full name: Jean-Michel Monin
- Born: 7 September 1967 (age 59) Argenteuil, France

Cycling career
- Sport: Cycling
- Current team: Retired
- Disciplines: Track; Road
- Role: Rider
- Rider type: Pursuiter

Amateur teams
- 1988–1989: Antony-Berny Cycliste
- 1992–1993: AS Corbeil–Essonnes
- 1999: CM Aubervilliers

Professional teams
- 1994: Catavana–AS Corbeil–Essonnes–Cedico
- 1995: Cédico–Sunjets–Ville de Charleroi
- 1996–1998: Aubervilliers 93

Managerial team
- 2000: Saint-Quentin–Oktos
Medal record
Representing France
Men's track cycling
Olympic Games
Gold medal – first place	1996 Atlanta	Team pursuit
World Championships
Silver medal – second place	1996 Manchester	Team pursuit

Jean-Michel Monin (born 7 September 1967 in Argenteuil) is a French former professional cyclist. He won the gold medal in the team pursuit at the 1996 Summer Olympics.
