= Anton Shantyr =

Russian cyclist

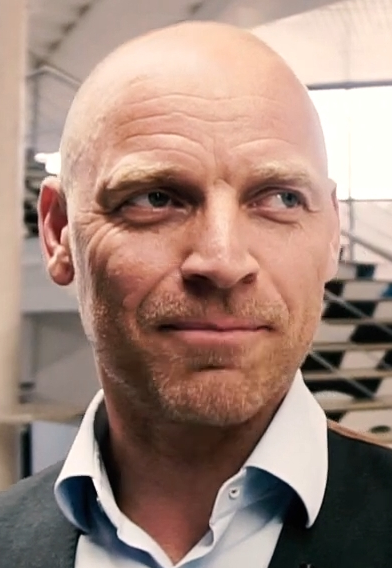
- Anton Shantyr in August 2019

Personal information
- Full name: Anton Igorevich Shantyr; Антон Игоревич Шантырь
- Born: 25 April 1974 (age 52) Budapest, People’s Republic of Hungary

Cycling career
- Sport: Cycling
- Disciplines: Road & Track

Professional teams
- 1998: Lokosphinx
- 1999: Team Gerolsteiner
- 2000–2003: Team Coast
Medal record
Representing Russia
Men's track cycling
Olympic Games
Silver medal – second place	1996 Atlanta	Team pursuit

Anton Igorevich Shantyr (Russian: Антон Игоревич Шантырь; born 25 April 1974 in Budapest) is a retired Russian professional road bicycle racer.

== Palmares ==
1996
(silver) , Olympic Games - Team Pursuit
1997
winner Sachsen Tour
