= Russia at the 1996 Summer Olympics =

- Flag of the Russian Federation
- IOC code: RUS
- NOC: Russian Olympic Committee
- Website: www.olympic.ru (in Russian)

in Atlanta
- Competitors: 390 (232 men and 158 women) in 25 sports
- Flag bearer: Alexander Karelin
- Medals Ranked 2nd: Gold 26 Silver 21 Bronze 16 Total 63

Summer Olympics appearances (overview)
- 1996; 2000; 2004; 2008; 2012; 2016; 2020–2024

Other related appearances
- Russian Empire (1900–1912); Soviet Union (1952–1988); Unified Team (1992); ROC (2020); Individual Neutral Athletes (2024)

The Russian Federation competed at the 1996 Summer Olympics in Atlanta, USA. It was the first time since 1912 that the nation participated separately from the other former countries of the Soviet Union. Russia had been a member of the Unified Team at the 1992 Summer Olympics together with 11 post-Soviet states. 390 competitors, 232 men and 158 women, took part in 212 events in 25 sports.

== Medalists ==
Medal	Name	Sport	Event
Gold	Svetlana Masterkova	Athletics	Women's 800 metres
Gold	Svetlana Masterkova	Athletics	Women's 1500 metres
Gold	Yelena Nikolayeva	Athletics	Women's 10 km walk
Gold	Oleg Saitov	Boxing	Welterweight
Gold	Zulfiya Zabirova	Cycling	Women's time trial
Gold	Dmitri Sautin	Diving	Men's 10 metre platform
Gold	Aleksandr Beketov	Fencing	Men's épée individual
Gold	Stanislav Pozdnyakov	Fencing	Men's sabre individual
Gold	Ilgar Mamedov, Vladislav Pavlovich; Dmitriy Shevchenko	Fencing	Men's foil team
Gold	Grigory Kiriyenko, Stanislav Pozdnyakov; Sergey Sharikov	Fencing	Men's sabre team
Gold	Alexei Nemov	Gymnastics	Men's vault
Gold	Sergei Kharkov, Nikolai Kryukov; Alexei Nemov, Yevgeni Podgorny; Dmitri Trush, Dmitri Vasilenko; Alexei Voropaev	Gymnastics	Men's team all-around
Gold	Svetlana Khorkina	Gymnastics	Women's uneven bars
Gold	Artem Khadjibekov	Shooting	Men's 10 metre air rifle
Gold	Boris Kokorev	Shooting	Men's 50 metre pistol
Gold	Olga Klochneva	Shooting	Women's 10 metre air pistol
Gold	Denis Pankratov	Swimming	Men's 100 metre butterfly
Gold	Denis Pankratov	Swimming	Men's 200 metre butterfly
Gold	Alexander Popov	Swimming	Men's 50 metre freestyle
Gold	Alexander Popov	Swimming	Men's 100 metre freestyle
Gold	Aleksei Petrov	Weightlifting	Men's 91 kg
Gold	Andrei Chemerkin	Weightlifting	Men's +108 kg
Gold	Vadim Bogiyev	Wrestling	Men's freestyle 68 kg
Gold	Buvaisar Saitiev	Wrestling	Men's freestyle 74 kg
Gold	Khadzhimurad Magomedov	Wrestling	Men's freestyle 82 kg
Gold	Alexander Karelin	Wrestling	Men's Greco-Roman 130 kg
Silver	Ilya Markov	Athletics	Men's 20 km walk
Silver	Mikhail Shchennikov	Athletics	Men's 50 km walk
Silver	Igor Trandenkov	Athletics	Men's pole vault
Silver	Inna Lasovskaya	Athletics	Women's triple jump
Silver	Natalya Sadova	Athletics	Women's discus throw
Silver	Valentina Yegorova	Athletics	Women's marathon
Silver	Eduard Gritsun, Nikolay Kuznetsov; Alexei Markov, Anton Shantyr	Cycling	Men's team pursuit
Silver	Irina Lashko	Diving	Women's 3 metre springboard
Silver	Sergey Sharikov	Fencing	Men's sabre individual
Silver	Aleksandr Beketov, Pavel Kolobkov; Valery Zakharevich	Fencing	Men's épée team
Silver	Alexei Nemov	Gymnastics	Men's individual all-around
Silver	Elena Dolgopolova, Rozalia Galiyeva; Elena Grosheva, Svetlana Khorkina; Dina Kochetkova, Yevgeniya Kuznetsova; Oksana Liapina	Gymnastics	Women's artistic team all-around
Silver	Yanina Batyrchina	Gymnastics	Women's rhythmic individual all-around
Silver	Eduard Zenovka	Modern pentathlon	Men's individual
Silver	Dmitri Shabanov, Georgy Shayduko; Igor Skalin	Sailing	Soling class
Silver	Irina Gerasimenok	Shooting	Women's 50 metre rifle three positions
Silver	Marina Logvinenko	Shooting	Women's 10 metre air pistol
Silver	Denis Pimankov, Alexander Popov; Vladimir Predkin, Vladimir Pyshnenko; Konstantin Ushkov, Roman Yegorov	Swimming	Men's 4 × 100 metre freestyle relay
Silver	Roman Ivanovsky, Vladislav Kulikov; Stanislav Lopukhov, Denis Pankratov; Alexander Popov, Vladimir Selkov; Roman Yegorov	Swimming	Men's 4 × 100 metre medley relay
Silver	Sergey Syrtsov	Weightlifting	Men's 108 kg
Silver	Makharbek Khadartsev	Wrestling	Men's freestyle 90 kg
Bronze	Irina Khudoroshkina	Athletics	Women's shot put
Bronze	Albert Pakeyev	Boxing	Flyweight
Bronze	Raimkul Malakhbekov	Boxing	Bantamweight
Bronze	Alexei Lezin	Boxing	Super Heavyweight
Bronze	Oleg Gorobiy, Anatoli Tishchenko; Georgiy Tsybulnikov, Sergey Verlin	Canoeing	Men's K-4 1000 metres
Bronze	Karina Aznavourian, Yuliya Garayeva; Maria Mazina	Fencing	Women's épée team
Bronze	Alexei Nemov	Gymnastics	Men's floor
Bronze	Alexei Nemov	Gymnastics	Men's pommel horse
Bronze	Alexei Nemov	Gymnastics	Men's horizontal bar
Bronze	Yevgeniya Bochkaryova, Irina Dzyuba; Yuliya Ivanova, Yelena Krivoshey; Olga Shtyrenko, Angelina Yushkova	Gymnastics	Women's rhythmic team all-around
Bronze	Nikolay Aksyonov, Anton Chermashentsev; Andrey Glukhov, Aleksandr Lukyanov; Sergey Matveyev, Pavel Melnikov; Roman Monchenko, Dmitry Rozinkevich; Vladimir Sokolov, Vladimir Volodenkov	Rowing	Men's eight
Bronze	Marina Logvinenko	Shooting	Women's 25 metre pistol
Bronze	Andrey Korneyev	Swimming	Men's 200 metre breaststroke
Bronze	Vladislav Kulikov	Swimming	Men's 100 metre butterfly
Bronze	Zafar Guliyev	Wrestling	Men's Greco-Roman 48 kg
Bronze	Aleksandr Tretyakov	Wrestling	Men's Greco-Roman 68 kg

== Results by event ==
=== Archery ===
The highest-placing archer was Rita Galinovskaya, at 14th place.

Men

Athlete	Event	Ranking Round		Round of 64	Round of 32	Round of 16	Quarterfinals	Semifinals	Final Bronze Final	
Athlete	Event	Score	Seed	Opposition Score	Opposition Score	Opposition Score	Opposition Score	Opposition Score	Opposition Score	Rank
Bair Badënov	Individual	635	53	White (USA) (12); L 152-161	Did not advance					53
Andrey Podlazov	Individual	643	51	Tang (CHN) (14); L 154-157	Did not advance					50
Balzhinima Tsyrempilov	Individual	675	6	Shin (KAZ) (59); W 164-163	Poikolainen (FIN) (38); L 163-164	Did not advance				18
Bair Badënov; Andrey Podlazov; Balzhinima Tsyrempilov	Team	1950	9			Slovenia (8); L 241-242	Did not advance			11

Women

Athlete	Event	Ranking Round		Round of 64	Round of 32	Round of 16	Quarterfinals	Semifinals	Final Bronze Final	
Athlete	Event	Score	Seed	Opposition Score	Opposition Score	Opposition Score	Opposition Score	Opposition Score	Opposition Score	Rank
Rita Galinovskaya	Individual	644	20	Otgon (MGL) (45); W 150(+10)-150(+6)	Kodama (JPN) (52); W 155-151	Kim (KOR) (4); L 157-164	Did not advance			14
Makhlukhanum Murzayeva	Individual	650	13	Kodama (JPN) (52); L 147-159	Did not advance					50
Elena Tutatchikova	Individual	641	23	Mensing (GER) (42); L 145-150	Did not advance					53
Rita Galinovskaya; Makhlukhanum Murzayeva; Elena Tutatchikova	Team	1935	5			Poland (12); L 229-233	Did not advance			10

=== Athletics ===
Men

Athlete	Events	Heat		Quarterfinal		Semifinal		Final	
Athlete	Events	Result	Rank	Result	Rank	Result	Rank	Result	Rank
Nikolay Afanasyev	Decathlon							6711	31
Pyotr Bochkaryov	Pole vault	5.70	1 q					5.86	5
Aleksandr Borichevskiy	Dscus throw	56.46	18					did not advance	
Viktor Chistiakov	Pole vault	5.60	9					did not advance	
Andrey Fedoriv	100 m	10.39	3 Q	10.34	7	did not advance			
Andrey Fedoriv	200 m	20.95	6	did not advance					
Vladimir Golyas	3000 m steeplechase	8:35.50	9 q			8:36.85	9	did not advance	
Andrey Ignatov	Long jump	8.00	7 q					7.83	11
Vadim Khersontsev	Hammer throw	74.48	8					did not advance	
Andrey Kislykh	110 m hurdles	13.74	3 Q	13.74	8	did not advance			
Ilya Konovalov	Hammer throw	75.10	6 q					78.72	5
Andrey Loginov	1500 m	3:40.99	5			did not advance			
Sergey Lyakhov	Dscus throw	62.42	4 q					60.62	11
Sergey Makarov	Javelin throw	85.88	2 Q					85.30	6
Ilya Markov	20 km walk							1:20:16	Silver medal
Ruslan Mashchenko	400 m hurdles	49.94	3			did not advance			
Nikolay Matyukhin	50 km walk							4:01:49	25
Andrey Moruyev	Javelin throw	77.20	11					did not advance	
Yuriy Naumkin	Long jump	8.21	3 Q					7.96	10
Vladimir Ovchinnikov	Javelin throw	78.20	7					did not advance	
Yevgeniy Palchikov	Shot put	18.96	9					did not advance	
Evgeny Pechenkin	110 m hurdles	13.86	5	did not advance					
Aleksey Petrukhnov	Long jump	7.50	16					did not advance	
Andrey Plotnikov	50 km walk							Did not finish	
Vladimir Pronin	3000 m steeplechase	8:29.49	6 Q			8:34.79	10	did not advance	
Igor Sautkin	Triple jump	16.06	19					did not advance	
Vyacheslav Shabunin	1500 m	3:38.56	6			did not advance			
Rishat Shafikov	20 km walk							1:20:41	5
Mikhail Shchennikov	20 km walk							1:21:09	7
Mikhail Shchennikov	50 km walk							3:43:46	Silver medal
Aleksey Shidlovskiy	Shot put	18.37	14					did not advance	
Leonid Shvetsov	Marathon							2:24:49	66
Vasiliy Sidorenko	Hammer throw	76.64	4 Q					74.68	12
Vasiliy Sokov	Triple jump	16.68	8					did not advance	
Viktor Sotnikov	Triple jump	16.86	5 q					7.83	11
Oleg Strizhakov	Marathon							2:19:51	37
Igor Trandenkov	Pole vault	5.70	4 q					5.92	Silver medal
Innokentiy Zharov; Mikhail Vdovin; Ruslan Mashchenko; Dmitriy Kosov	4 × 400 m relay	3:04.73	2 Q			3:05.63	8	did not advance	

Women

Athlete	Events	Heat		Quarterfinal		Semifinal		Final	
Athlete	Events	Result	Rank	Result	Rank	Result	Rank	Result	Rank
Yelena Afanasyeva	800 m	1:59.18	2 Q			1:57.77	2 Q	1:59.57	5
Anna Biryukova	Triple jump	14.19	7					did not advance	
Lyudmila Borisova	1500 m	4:13.29	1 Q			4:06.89	6 q	4:05.90	7
Ramilya Burangulova	Marathon							2:38:04	35
Olga Chernyavskaya	Discus throw	63.02	2 Q					64.70	6
Lyudmila Galkina	Long jump	Not Mark						did not advance	
Svetlana Goncharenko	400 m	51.07	2 Q	51.35	4 Q	50.84	5	did not advance	
Yuliya Graudyn	100 m hurdles	12.95	3 Q	12.77	3 Q	12.74	6	did not advance	
Yelena Gruzinova	10 km walk							43:50	10
Yelena Gulyayeva	High jump	1.93	1 q					1.99	5
Valentina Ivanova	Discus throw	58.38	13					did not advance	
Klara Kashapova	10000 m	33:28.34	12					did not advance	
Natalya Kayukova	Triple jump	13.54	8					did not advance	
Irina Khudoroshkina	Shot put	19.03	4 Q					19.35	Bronze medal
Anna Knoroz	400 m hurdles	56.21	4			did not advance			
Irina Korzhanenko	Shot put	18.92	4 Q					18.68	8
Olga Kotlyarova	400 m	51.90	4 Q	51.36	6	did not advance			
Svetlana Krivelyova	Shot put	18.23	7					did not advance	
Inna Lasovskaya	Triple jump	14.75	1 Q					14.98	Silver medal
Yelena Lebedenko	Heptathlon							6082	17
Yuliya Lyakhova	High jump	1.85	11					did not advance	
Galina Malchugina	200 m	22.63	1 Q	22.69	2 Q	22.35	2 Q	22.45	5
Svetlana Masterkova	800 m	1:59.67	1 Q			1:57.95	1 Q	1:57.73	Gold medal
Svetlana Masterkova	1500 m	4:09.88	2 Q			4:10.35	3 Q	4:00.83	Gold medal
Svetlana Moskalets	Heptathlon							6118	14
Tatyana Motkova	High jump	1.93	1 q					1.96	6
Yelena Nikolayeva	10 km walk							41:49	Gold medal
Oksana Ovchinnikova	Javelin throw	57.28	9					did not advance	
Lyudmila Petrova	10000 m	31:58.84	9 q					32:25.89	14
Natalya Pomoshchnikova-Voronova	100 m	11.22	2 Q	11.17	3 Q	11.07	3 Q	11.10	6
Irina Privalova	100 m	11.42	3 Q	11.40	4 Q	11.31	7	did not advance	
Irina Privalova	200 m	23.16	2 Q	22.82	3 Q	Did Not Start		did not advance	
Tatyana Reshetnikova	100 m hurdles	13.01	5 q	13.01	6	did not advance			
Lyudmila Rogachova	1500 m	4:07.61	6 Q			4:14.54	11	did not advance	
Yelena Romanova	5000 m	15:23.37	4 Q					15:14.09	6
Olga Rublyova	Long jump	6.47	13					did not advance	
Natalya Sadova	Discus throw	62.28	5 Q					66.48	Silver medal
Natalya Shekhodanova	100 m hurdles	13.24	6 q	12.68	2 Q	12.67	3 Q	12.80	DSQ
Yelena Sinchukova	Long jump	6.31	10					did not advance	
Irina Stankina	10 km walk							DSQ	
Firiya Sultanova	10000 m	32:40.91	14					did not advance	
Marina Trandenkova	100 m	11.20	1 Q	11.15	2 Q	11.07	3 Q	11.06	5
Lyubov Tsyoma	800 m	2:00.18	5 q			2:02.50	8	did not advance	
Irina Tyukhay	Heptathlon							5903	19
Valentina Yegorova	Marathon							2:28:05	Silver medal
Alla Zhilyaeva	Marathon							Did not finish	
Yekaterina Leshchova; Galina Malchugina; Irina Privalova; Natalya Pomoshchnikova-Voronova	4 × 100 m relay	43.00	1 Q					42.27	4
Tatyana Chebykina; Svetlana Goncharenko; Olga Kotlyarova; Yekaterina Kulikova	4 × 400 m relay	3:24.86	3 Q					3:22.22	5

=== Badminton ===
Men

Athlete	Event	Round of 64	Round of 32	Round of 16	Quarterfinals	Semifinals	Final	
Athlete	Event	Opposition Score	Opposition Score	Opposition Score	Opposition Score	Opposition Score	Opposition Score	Rank
Andrei Antropov	Singles		Sidek (MAS) (5/8); L 11–15, 7-15	Did not advance				
Pavel Uvarov	Singles	van Dijk (NED); L 8–15, 10-15	Did not advance					
Andrei Antropov; Nikolai Zuyev	Doubles		Ponting (GBR); Robertson (GBR); W 18–13, 7–15, 15-4	Helber (GER); Keck (GER); W 15–1, 15-7	Ariantho (INA); Kantono (INA) (5/8); L 5–15, 1-15	Did not advance		5

Women

Athlete	Event	Round of 64	Round of 32	Round of 16	Quarterfinals	Semifinals	Final	
Athlete	Event	Opposition Score	Opposition Score	Opposition Score	Opposition Score	Opposition Score	Opposition Score	Rank
Elena Rybkina	Singles	Muggeridge (GBR); W 11–6, 12-11	Mizui (JPN); L 1–11, 8-11	Did not advance				
Marina Yakusheva	Singles		Yao (CHN) (5/8); L 4–11, 4-11	Did not advance				
Elena Rybkina; Marina Yakusheva	Doubles		Jørgensen (DEN); Olsen (DEN); L 13–15, 10-15	Did not advance				

Mixed

Athlete	Event	Round of 64	Round of 32	Round of 16	Quarterfinals	Semifinals	Final	
Athlete	Event	Opposition Score	Opposition Score	Opposition Score	Opposition Score	Opposition Score	Opposition Score	Rank
Nikolai Zuyev; Marina Yakusheva	Mixed		Heryanto (INA); Timur (INA) (2); L 6–15, 6-15	Did not advance				

=== Basketball ===
==== Women's tournament ====
Roster

Russia National Basketball Team roster
Players
Coaches

Pos.	No.	Name	Age – Date of birth	Height	Club	Ctr.
G	4	Yevgeniya Nikonova	25 – November 1, 1970	5 ft 9 in (1.75 m)
F	5	Lyudmila Konovalova	28 – January 7, 1968	5 ft 9 in (1.75 m)
G	6	Irina Rutkovskaya	27 – January 14, 1969	5 ft 9 in (1.75 m)
C	7	Maria Stepanova	17 – February 23, 1979	6 ft 8 in (2.03 m)
F	8	Yelena Baranova	24 – January 28, 1972	6 ft 4 in (1.93 m)
F	9	Nataliya Svinukhova	24 – May 20, 1972	6 ft 3 in (1.91 m)
F	10	Svetlana Kuznetsova	31 – January 10, 1965	6 ft 1 in (1.85 m)
C	11	Oksana Zakalyuzhnaya	18 – December 18, 1977	6 ft 6 in (1.98 m)
G	12	Irina Sumnikova	31 – October 15, 1964	5 ft 7 in (1.7 m)
C	13	Elen Shakirova	26 – June 2, 1970	6 ft 3 in (1.91 m)
F	14	Yelena Pshikova	26 – June 1, 1970	6 ft 3 in (1.91 m)
G	15	Svetlana Antipova	29 – August 20, 1966	5 ft 11 in (1.8 m)

Head coach

- (Russia) Vadim Kapranov

Legend

- (C) Team captain
- nat field describes country
  of last club
  before the tournament
- Age field is age on July 21, 1996

Preliminary round

Pos	Team	Pld	W	L	PF	PA	PD	Pts	Qualification
1	Brazil	5	5	0	424	360	+64	10	Quarterfinals
2	Russia	5	4	1	378	342	+36	9	Quarterfinals
3	Italy	5	3	2	330	309	+21	8	Quarterfinals
4	Japan	5	2	3	365	396	−31	7	Quarterfinals
5	China	5	1	4	347	378	−31	6	
6	Canada	5	0	5	293	352	−59	5	

Source: FIBA archive
Rules for classification: 1) points; 2) head-to-head points; 3) head-to-head goal average; 4) head-to-head number of points scored.

21 July 1996

Boxscore

Japan	63–73	Russia
Pts: Kato 15; Rebs: Kato 9 Asts: Murakami 6		Pts: Baranova 21; Rebs: Baranova 13; Asts: Sumnikova 5

Morehouse College Gymnasium, Atlanta

23 July 1996

Boxscore

Russia	68–82	Brazil
Pts: Rutkovskaya 18; Rebs: Baranova 9 Asts: Zaboluyeva 3		Pts: Hortência 20; Rebs: Marta Sobral 9 Asts: three players 4

Morehouse College Gymnasium, Atlanta

25 July 1996

Boxscore

Italy	70–75	Russia
Pts: Pollini 22; Rebs: Pollini 8 Asts: Fullin 5		Pts: Shakirova 24; Rebs: Shakirova, Baranova 12; Asts: Sumnikova 9

Morehouse College Gymnasium, Atlanta

27 July 1996

Boxscore

Russia	68–49	Canada
Pts: Nikonova 18; Rebs: Baranova 11; Asts: Sumnikova 5		Pts: Norman 15; Rebs: Norman 8 Asts: three players 2

Morehouse College Gymnasium, Atlanta

29 July 1996

Boxscore

Russia	94–78	China
Pts: Baranova 26; Rebs: Baranova 18; Asts: Sumnikova 10		Pts: Zheng D, Ma Z 14; Rebs: Liang X 6 Asts: Zheng D 5

Morehouse College Gymnasium, Atlanta

Quarterfinal

31 July 1996
17:00

Boxscore

Russia	70–74 (OT)	Australia
Scoring by half: 38–38, 26–26 Overtime: 6–10
Pts: Nikonova 16; Rebs: Baranova 21; Asts: Sumnikova 5		Pts: Brogan 17; Rebs: Brogan, Whittle 8 Asts: Brogan, Timms 3

Georgia Dome, Atlanta

Classification 5-8

1 August 1996
15:00

Boxscore

Russia	80–69	Japan
Scoring by half: 39–34, 41–35
Pts: Baranova 37; Rebs: Baranova 13; Asts: Sumnikova 14		Pts: Kato 19; Rebs: Ichijo 12; Asts: Murakami 7

Georgia Dome, Atlanta

Final 5-6

3 August 1996
17:00

Boxscore

Cuba	74–91	Russia
Scoring by half: 41–44, 33–47
Pts: Martínez 19; Rebs: Martínez 11; Asts: Seino 4		Pts: Baranova 20; Rebs: Baranova 8 Asts: Sumnikova 8

Georgia Dome, Atlanta

=== Boxing ===
Athlete	Event	Round of 32	Round of 16	Quarterfinals	Semifinals	Final	Rank
Athlete	Event	Opposition Result	Opposition Result	Opposition Result	Opposition Result	Opposition Result	Rank
Albert Pakeyev	Flyweight	Sunee (MRI); W 8-1	Muluka (ZAM); W 13-4	Reyes (COL); W +13-13	Romero (CUB); L 6-12	Did not advance	Bronze medal
Raimkul Malakhbekov	Bantamweight	Cotto (PUR); W 16-6	Boulehia (ALG); W RSC	Tseyen-Oidov (MGL); W 21-9	Mesa (CUB); L 14-14+	Did not advance	Bronze medal
Ramaz Paliani	Featherweight	Shin (KOR); W 10-7	Ouzlian (GRE); W 27-2	Kamsing (THA); L 4-13	Did not advance		
Eduard Zakharov	Light Welterweight	Nitami (JPN); W 21-6	Boudreault (CAN); W 11-9	Vinent (CUB); L 7-15	Did not advance		
Oleg Saitov	Welterweight	Sume (TUR); W 11-1	Bae (KOR); W 9-5	Chater (TUN); W 9-3	Santos (PUR); W 13-11	Hernández (CUB); W 14-9	Gold medal
Aleksandr Lebziak	Middleweight	Donaldson (JAM); W 20-4	Crawford (AUS); W RSCH	Hernández (CUB); L 8-15	Did not advance		
Dmitry Vybornov	Light Heavyweight	Tarver (USA); L 2-5	Did not advance				
Igor Kshinin	Heavyweight	Amro (EGY); W 17-4	Krasniqi (GER); L 2-10	Did not advance			
Alexei Lezin	Super Heavyweight		Yurchenko (KAZ); W RSCI	Monse (GER); W 9-5	Klitschko (UKR); L 1-4	Did not advance	Bronze medal

=== Canoeing ===
==== Slalom ====
Men

Athlete	Event	Run 1		Run 2		Total	Rank
Athlete	Event	Time	Rank	Time	Rank	Total	Rank
Anton Lazko	K-1	166.11		290.56		166.11	35
Danila Kuznetsov	C-1	273.36		226.06		226.06	27

==== Flatwater ====
Men

Athlete	Event	Heats		Repechage		Semifinals		Final	
Athlete	Event	Time	Rank	Time	Rank	Time	Rank	Time	Rank
Sergey Verlin	K-1 500 m	1:45.228	6 QR	1:43.359	4 QS	1:41.791	5	Did not advance	
Anatoli Tishchenko; Oleg Gorobiy	K-2 500 m	1:31.589	3 QS			1:30.031	2 QF	1:29.677	4
Aleksandr Ivanik; Andrey Tissin	K-2 1000 m	3:46.558	6 QR	3:35.200	3 QS	3:22.306	7 QF	Did not advance	
Anatoli Tishchenko; Oleg Gorobiy; Sergey Verlin; Georgiy Tsybulnikov	K-4 1000 m	3:11.128	2 QF					2:53.996	Bronze medal
Andrey Kabanov; Pavel Konovalov	C-2 500 m	1:46.307	3 QS			1:43.141	4 QF	1:42.496	6

Women

Athlete	Event	Heats		Repechage		Semifinals		Final	
Athlete	Event	Time	Rank	Time	Rank	Time	Rank	Time	Rank
Natalya Gouilly; Larissa Kosorukova	K-2 500 m	1:47.186	4 QR	1:52.520	1 QS	1:45.505	4 QF	1:43.237	8
Olga Tishchenko; Larissa Kosorukova; Natalya Gouilly; Tatyana Tischenko	K-4 500 m	1:41.695	5 QS			1:39.764	2 QF	1:34.345	7

=== Cycling ===
==== Mountain biking ====
Women

Athlete	Event	Time	Rank
Nadezhda Pashkova	Cross-country	2:16:36 (+ 25:45)	27
Alla Yepifanova	Cross-country	2:01:35 (+ 10:44)	14

==== Road ====
Men

Athlete	Event	Time	Rank
Evgeni Berzin	Road race	4:56:53 (+ 02:57)	103
Evgeni Berzin	Time trial	1:07:53 (+ 03:48)	15
Vassili Davidenko	Road race	4:56:44 (+ 02:48)	27
Dimitri Konyshev	Road race	4:56:25 (+ 02:29)	13
Pavel Tonkov	Road race	4:56:46 (+ 02:50)	51
Piotr Ugrumov	Road race	4:56:46 (+ 02:50)	58

Women

Athlete	Event	Time	Rank
Zulfiya Zabirova	Road race	2:37:06 (+ 00:53)	6
Zulfiya Zabirova	Time trial	36:40	Gold medal
Svetlana Samokhvalova	Road race	Did not finish	
Svetlana Bubnenkova	Road race	Did not finish	
Svetlana Bubnenkova	Time trial	40:16 (+ 03:36)	18

==== Track ====
Time trials

Athlete	Event	Time Speed	Rank
Aleksandr Kirichenko	Men's track time trial	1:07.013; 53.72	18

Sprints

Athlete	Event	Qualifying		1/8 Finals	1/8 Finals Repechage	Quarterfinals	Semifinals	Finals	
Athlete	Event	Time Speed	Rank	Opposition Time Speed	Opposition Time Speed	Opposition Time Speed	Opposition Time Speed	Opposition Time Speed	Rank
Oksana Grishina	Women's sprint	11.298	3	Larreal (VEN); W 12.209		Neumann (GER); W 12.119, L, L		Final 5-8; Salumäe (EST); Wang (CHN); Dubnicoff (CAN); W 12.416	5

Pursuits

Athlete	Event	Qualifying		First round		Semifinals		Finals	
Athlete	Event	Time	Rank	Opposition Time	Rank	Opposition Time	Rank	Opposition Time	Rank
Alexei Markov	Men's individual pursuit	4:27.074	3	Szonn (GER); 4:24.863	3	Ermenault (FRA); 4:26.828	4	Did not advance	
Eduard Gritsun; Nikolay Kuznetsov; Alexei Markov; Anton Shantyr	Men's team pursuit	4:11.665	5	Ukraine; 4:08.785	1	Australia; 4:06.885	2	France; 4:07.730	Silver medal
Natalya Karimova	Women's individual pursuit	3:45.246	10	Did not advance					

Points Races

Athlete	Event	Points/Laps	Rank
Pavel Khamidulin	Men's points race	4 / -1	14
Svetlana Samokhvalova	Women's points race	14 / 0	4

=== Diving ===
Men

Athlete	Events	Preliminary		Semifinal				Final			
Athlete	Events	Points	Rank	Points	Rank	Points (prelim+semi)	Rank	Points	Rank	Points (semi+final)	Rank
Dmitri Sautin	3 m Springboard	391.74	6 Q	229.74	2	621.48	5 Q	414.93	6	644.67	5
Dmitri Sautin	10 m Platform	452.82	1 Q	194.64	2	647.46	1 Q	497.70	1	692.34	Gold medal
Valery Statsenko	3 m Springboard	357.18	15 Q	217.53	9	574.71	11 Q	380.16	11	597.69	9
Vladimir Timoshinin	10 m Platform	425.43	4 Q	169.47	11	594.90	4 Q	459.12	4	628.59	5

Women

Athlete	Events	Preliminary		Semifinal				Final			
Athlete	Events	Points	Rank	Points	Rank	Points (prelim+semi)	Rank	Points	Rank	Points (semi+final)	Rank
Vera Ilyina	3 m Springboard	308.88	1 Q	230.19	2	539.07	1 Q	263.37	10	493.56	7
Irina Lashko	3 m Springboard	271.92	8 Q	234.51	1	506.43	3 Q	277.68	6	512.19	Silver medal
Olga Khristoforova	10 m Platform	268.65	8 Q	167.07	5	435.72	8 Q	259.05	9	426.12	8
Svetlana Timoshinina	10 m Platform	242.76	20	Did not advance							

=== Fencing ===
Fifteen fencers, nine men and six women, represented Russia in 1996.

Men

Athlete	Event	Round of 64	Round of 32	Round of 16	Quarterfinals	Semifinals	Final	Rank
Athlete	Event	Opposition Score	Opposition Score	Opposition Score	Opposition Score	Opposition Score	Opposition Score	Rank
Aleksandr Beketov (18)	Individual épée		Burgin (SUI) (15); W 15-12	Srecki (FRA) (2); W 15-10	Henry (FRA) (7); W 15-13	Kovács (HUN) (3); W 15-8	Trevejo (CUB) (20); W 15-14	Gold medal
Grigory Kiriyenko (1)	Individual sabre		Banos (CAN) (32); W 15-8	Sznajder (POL) (16); L 11-15	Did not advance			
Pavel Kolobkov (14)	Individual épée		Yang (KOR) (19); W 15-14	Kovács (HUN) (3); L 11-15	Did not advance			
Ilgar Mamedov (27)	Individual foil	Chung (KOR) (38); L 8-15	Did not advance					
Vladislav Pavlovich (21)	Individual foil	Perez Araque (VEN) (44); W 15-2	Guerra (ESP) (12); W 15-11	Plumenail (FRA) (5); L 12-15	Did not advance			
Stanislav Pozdnyakov (2)	Individual sabre		You (KOR) (34); W 15-6	Medina (ESP) (18); W 15-11	Gutzeit (UKR) (10); W 15-14	Navarrete (HUN) (3); W 15-7	Sharikov (RUS) (5); W 15-12	Gold medal
Sergey Sharikov (5)	Individual sabre		Williams (GBR) (28); W 15-11	Szabó (HUN) (12); W 15-8	Wiesinger (GER) (20); W 15-6	Touya (FRA) (9); W 15-14	Pozdnyakov (RUS) (2); L 12-15	Silver medal
Dmitriy Shevchenko (2)	Individual foil		Kim (KOR) (31); L 13-15	Did not advance				
Valery Zakharevich (33)	Individual épée	Pena (ESP) (32); W 15-8	Cuomo (ITA) (1); L 14-15	Did not advance				
Aleksandr Beketov; Pavel Kolobkov; Valery Zakharevich (6)	Team épée			Romania (11); W 45-35	Hungary (3); W 45-39	France (2); W 45-42	Italy (1); L 43-45	Silver medal
Ilgar Mamedov; Vladislav Pavlovich; Dmitriy Shevchenko (4)	Team foil				Hungary (5); W 45-43	Cuba (1); W 45-44	Poland (6); W 45-40	Gold medal
Grigory Kiriyenko; Stanislav Pozdnyakov; Sergey Sharikov (1)	Team sabre				Spain (8); W 45-34	Italy (4); W 45-28	Hungary (2); W 45-25	Gold medal

Women

Athlete	Event	Round of 64	Round of 32	Round of 16	Quarterfinals	Semifinals	Final	Rank
Athlete	Event	Opposition Score	Opposition Score	Opposition Score	Opposition Score	Opposition Score	Opposition Score	Rank
Karina Aznavourian (20)	Individual épée	Tanaka (JPN) (48); W 15-5	Zalaffi (HUN) (13); L 12-15	Did not advance				
Svetlana Boyko (15)	Individual foil		Scarlat (ROU) (18); L 10-15	Did not advance				
Yuliya Garayeva (34)	Individual épée	Sotra (YUG) (31); W 15-7	Szalay (HUN) (2); L 14-15	Did not advance				
Maria Mazina (17)	Individual épée	Escanellas (PUR) (48); W 15-11	Uga (ITA) (16); L 9-15	Did not advance				
Olga Sharkova (20)	Individual foil		Modaine-Cessac (FRA) (13); L 14-15	Did not advance				
Olga Velichko (17)	Individual foil		Lantos-Romaczne (HUN) (16); W 15-14	Vezzali (ITA) (1); L 13-15	Did not advance			
Karina Aznavourian; Yuliya Garayeva; Maria Mazina (6)	Team épée			Japan (11); W 45-33	Germany (3); W 45-37	France (2); L 39-45	Bronze medal final Hungary (1); W 45-44	
Svetlana Boyko; Olga Sharkova; Olga Velichko (6)	Team foil			Argentina (11); W 45-20	Romania (3); L 41-45	Classification 5 – 8 Poland (10); W 45-44	Classification 5 – 6 France (5); L 44-45	6

=== Gymnastics ===
==== Artistic ====
Men

Athlete	Event	Apparatus						Final	
Athlete	Event	Floor	Pommel horse	Rings	Vault	Parallel bars	Horizontal bar	Total	Rank
Sergei Kharkov	Qualification	9.662		19.162	19.262	19.312 Q	19.250	86.648	87
Sergei Kharkov	Parallel bars					9.650		9.650	8
Nikolai Kryukov	Qualification	9.525	19.237		19.212	19.237	19.125	86.336	88
Alexei Nemov	Qualification	19.450 Q	19.412 Q	19.150	19.425 Q	19.387 Q	19.537 Q	116.361	1 Q
Alexei Nemov	All-around	9.700	9.800	9.612	9.700	9.762	9.800	58.374	Silver medal
Alexei Nemov	Floor	9.800						9.800	Bronze medal
Alexei Nemov	Pommel horse		9.787					9.787	Bronze medal
Alexei Nemov	Vault				9.787			9.787	Gold medal
Alexei Nemov	Parallel bars					9.750		9.750	4
Alexei Nemov	Horizontal bar						9.800	9.800	Bronze medal
Yevgeni Podgorny	Qualification	19.549 Q	18.625	18.837	19.212	9.225	18.975	104.423	66
Yevgeni Podgorny	Floor	9.550						9.550	6
Dmitri Trush	Qualification	19.012	18.825	19.000		9.637	18.975	85.449	91
Dmitri Vasilenko	Qualification	19.349	18.887	18.975	19.262	18.950		95.423	78
Alexei Voropaev	Qualification	19.249	18.825	19.250	19.450 Q	19.000	19.362 Q	115.136	3 Q
Alexei Voropaev	All-around	9.687	8.400	9.737	9.662	9.625	9.712	56.823	24
Alexei Voropaev	Vault				9.618			9.618	6
Alexei Voropaev	Horizontal bar						9.712	9.712	6
Sergei Kharkov; Nikolai Kryukov; Alexei Nemov; Yevgeni Podgorny; Dmitri Trush; Dmitri Vasilenko; Alexei Voropaev	Team	96.784	95.286	95.537	96.749	96.173	96.249	576.778	Gold medal

Women

Athlete	Event	Apparatus				Final	
Athlete	Event	Vault	Uneven Bars	Balance Beam	Floor	Total	Rank
Elena Dolgopolova	Qualification	19.387	18.874		19.425	57.686	82
Rozalia Galiyeva	Qualification	19.512 Q	19.512	19.462 Q	19.237	77.723	8 Q
Rozalia Galiyeva	All-around	9.681	9.762	9.825	9.787	38.905	7
Rozalia Galiyeva	Vault	9.743				9.743	4
Rozalia Galiyeva	Balance Beam			9.112		9.112	7
Elena Grosheva	Qualification	19.500 Q	19.012	18.987	19.525	77.024	14
Elena Grosheva	Vault	9.637				9.637	7
Svetlana Khorkina	Qualification	19.350	19.662 Q	19.312	19.324	77.648	9 Q
Svetlana Khorkina	All-around	9.706	9.262	9.787	9.700	38.455	15
Svetlana Khorkina	Uneven Bars		9.850			9.850	Gold medal
Dina Kochetkova	Qualification	19.399	19.625 Q	19.500 Q	19.462 Q	77.986	3 Q
Dina Kochetkova	All-around	9.581	9.787	9.825	9.787	38.980	6
Dina Kochetkova	Uneven Bars		9.787			9.787	5
Dina Kochetkova	Balance Beam			9.737		9.737	4
Dina Kochetkova	Floor				9.800	9.800	5
Yevgeniya Kuznetsova	Qualification	9.637	19.400	19.112		48.149	90
Oksana Liapina	Qualification	9.575		18.725	19.337	47.637	92
Elena Dolgopolova; Rozalia Galiyeva; Elena Grosheva; Svetlana Khorkina; Dina Kochetkova; Yevgeniya Kuznetsova; Oksana Liapina	Team	97.148	97.598	96.473	97.185	388.404	Silver medal

==== Rhythmic ====
Athlete	Event	Preliminaries						Semifinals						Final					
Athlete	Event	Rope	Ball	Clubs	Ribbon	Total	Rank	Rope	Ball	Clubs	Ribbon	Total	Rank	Rope	Ball	Clubs	Ribbon	Total	Rank
Amina Zaripova	Individual	9.716	9.699	9.583	9.750	38.748	3 Q	9.716	9.850	9.782	9.316	38.664	7 Q	9.783	9.866	9.832	9.783	39.264	4
Yanina Batyrchina	Individual	9.816	9.266	9.350	9.316	37.748	13 Q	9.850	9.866	9.733	9.783	39.232	3 Q	9.850	9.916	9.933	9.683	39.382	Silver medal

Athlete	Event	Preliminaries				Final			
Athlete	Event	5 Hoops	3 Balls 2 Ribbons	Total	Rank	5 Hoops	3 Balls 2 Ribbons	Total	Rank
Yevgeniya Bochkaryova; Irina Dzyuba; Yuliya Ivanova; Yelena Krivoshey; Olga Shtyrenko; Angelina Yushkova	Team	19.516	19.366	38.882	3 Q	19.466	18.899	38.365	Bronze medal

=== Handball ===
Men's team

Russia National Handball Team roster
Players
Coaches

Pos.	#	Name	Age	Ht.	Weight	Club
G		Lavrov, Andrey	34 – 26 March 1962	6 ft 6 in (1.98 m)	207 lb (94 kg)
CB		Lavrov, Igor	23 – 4 June 1973	6 ft 0 in (1.83 m)	176 lb (80 kg)
P		Frantsusov, Aleksei	24 – 16 October 1971	6 ft 6 in (1.98 m)	225 lb (102 kg)
CB		Kuleshov, Oleg	22 – 15 April 1974	6 ft 1 in (1.85 m)	209 lb (95 kg)
RW		Krivoshlykov, Denis	25 – 10 May 1971	5 ft 11 in (1.8 m)	187 lb (85 kg)
RW		Voronin, Lev	25 – 8 June 1971	6 ft 1 in (1.85 m)	183 lb (83 kg)
LW		Gopin, Valery	32 – 8 May 1964	6 ft 1 in (1.85 m)	192 lb (87 kg)
LB		Kudinov, Vasily	27 – 17 February 1969	6 ft 5 in (1.96 m)	220 lb (100 kg)
P		Torgovanov, Dmitri	24 – 5 January 1972	6 ft 7 in (2.01 m)	231 lb (105 kg)
G		Sukosyan, Pavel	34 – 4 January 1962	6 ft 7 in (2.01 m)	243 lb (110 kg)
P		Grebnev, Oleg	28 – 4 February 1968	6 ft 9 in (2.06 m)	243 lb (110 kg)
RB		Kiselyov, Oleg	29 – 11 January 1967	6 ft 6 in (1.98 m)	231 lb (105 kg)
LB		Gorpishin, Vyacheslav	26 – 20 January 1970	6 ft 7 in (2.01 m)	220 lb (100 kg)
RB		Pogorelov, Sergey	22 – 2 June 1974	6 ft 6 in (1.98 m)	243 lb (110 kg)
LW		Filippov, Dmitry	27 – 19 May 1969	6 ft 2 in (1.88 m)	181 lb (82 kg)

Head coach

- (Russia) Vladimir Maksimov

Legend

- nat field describes country
  of last club
  before the tournament
- Age field is age on July 24, 1996
- Position

-G: Goalkeeper
-P: Pivot
-CB: Centre Back
-LW: Left Wing
-RW: Right Wing
-LB: Left Back
-RB: Right Back

(1)

Preliminary round

Team	Pld	W	D	L	GF	GA	GD	Points
Sweden	5	5	0	0	131	94	37	10
Croatia	5	4	0	1	132	122	10	8
Russia	5	3	0	2	137	106	31	6
Switzerland	5	2	0	3	126	115	11	4
United States	5	1	0	3	111	142	-31	2
Kuwait	5	0	0	5	100	158	-58	0

24 July	Russia	32–20	Kuwait	Referees: H. Thomas (GER), J. Thomas (GER)
24 July	Kuleshov 7		Almarzouq 6	Referees: H. Thomas (GER), J. Thomas (GER)

26 July	Russia	31–16	United States	Referees: Moelle Mabounda (CGO), Mvoula (CGO)
26 July	Kudinov 10		Penn 4	Referees: Moelle Mabounda (CGO), Mvoula (CGO)

28 July	Sweden	22–20	Russia	Referees: Gallego Santos (ESP), Lamas Perez (ESP)
28 July	M. Andersson 5		Gopin, Torgovanov 5	Referees: Gallego Santos (ESP), Lamas Perez (ESP)

30 July	Russia	24–25	Croatia	Referees: Per Elbrond (DEN), Lovqvist (DEN)
30 July	Gopin 7		Jović 7	Referees: Per Elbrond (DEN), Lovqvist (DEN)

1 August	Russia	30–23	Switzerland	Referees: Garsia (FRA), Moreno (FRA)
1 August	Kuleshov 9		Spengler 8	Referees: Garsia (FRA), Moreno (FRA)

Classification 5-6 places

2 August	Egypt	26–29	Russia	Referees: Gallego Santos (ESP), Lamas Perez (ESP)
2 August	El Attar 10		Voronin, Kudinov 5	Referees: Gallego Santos (ESP), Lamas Perez (ESP)

=== Judo ===
Men

Athlete	Event	Preliminary	Round of 32	Round of 16	Quarterfinals	Semifinals	Final	First Repechage Round	Repechage Quarterfinals	Repechage Semifinals	Bronze Medal Finals	Rank
Athlete	Event	Opposition Result	Opposition Result	Opposition Result	Opposition Result	Opposition Result	Opposition Result	Opposition Result	Opposition Result	Opposition Result	Opposition Result	Rank
Nikolay Ozhegin	−60 kg		Ayed (TUN); W	Nomura (JPN); L	Did not advance			Carcamo (HON); W	Meridja (ALG); W	Donohue (GBR); W	Trautmann (GER); L	5
Islam Matsiev	−65 kg		Nakamura (JPN); L	Did not advance				Nyamlkhagva (MGL); L	Did not advance			
Sergey Kolesnikov	−71 kg	Kingston (GBR); L	Did not advance									
Konstantin Savchishkin	−78 kg		Bouras (FRA); L	Did not advance				Yuan (CHN); W	García (ARG); L	Did not advance		
Oleg Maltsev	−86 kg		Ao (CHN); W	Bagdasarov (UZB); L	Did not advance			Celestin (HAI); W	Merkevičius (LTU); W	Yoshida (JPN); L	Did not advance	7
Dmitri Sergeyev	−95 kg		Solovyov (UZB); W	Kim (KOR); L	Did not advance			Þorleifsson (ISL); W	Sonnemans (NED); L	Did not advance		
Serguei Kossorotov	+95 kg		Geraldino (DOM); W	Flexa (BRA); W	Liu (CHN); L	Did not advance			Lungu (ROU); W	Möller (GER); L	Did not advance	7

Women

Athlete	Event	Round of 32	Round of 16	Quarterfinals	Semifinals	Final	First Repechage Round	Repechage Quarterfinals	Repechage Semifinals	Bronze Medal Finals	Rank
Athlete	Event	Opposition Result	Opposition Result	Opposition Result	Opposition Result	Opposition Result	Opposition Result	Opposition Result	Opposition Result	Opposition Result	Rank
Marina Kovrigina	−52 kg	Schmutz (SUI); W	Muñoz (ESP); L	Did not advance							
Zulfiya Garipova	−56 kg	Liu (CHN); L	Did not advance				West (USA); W	Huang (TPE); W	Fairbrother (GBR); L	Did not advance	7
Tatyana Bogomyagkova	−61 kg	Emoto (JPN); L	Did not advance				Fleury-Vachon (FRA); W	Arad (ISR); L	Did not advance		
Yelena Kotelnikova	−66 kg		Spacek (AUT); L	Did not advance							
Svetlana Galante	−72 kg		Werbrouck (BEL); L	Did not advance				Fleury-Vachon (ESP); W	Scapin (ITA); L	Did not advance	7
Svetlana Gundarenko	+72 kg		Silva (BRA); W	Gránitz (HUN); W	Sun (CHN); L	Did not advance				Cicot (FRA); L	5

=== Modern pentathlon ===
Men

Athlete	Shoot	Fence	Swim	Ride	Run	Total Points	Rank
Eduard Zenovka	1084	820	1268	1016	1342	5530	Silver medal
Dmitri Svatkovskiy	1012	880	1248	1010	1339	5489	4
Grigory Bremel	940	850	1140	950	928	4808	28

=== Rowing ===
Men

Athlete(s)	Event	Heats		Repechage		Semifinals		Final	
Athlete(s)	Event	Time	Rank	Time	Rank	Time	Rank	Time	Rank
Anton Sema	Single sculls	7:49.44	5 R	8:46.71	4 SF	7:28.44	3 FC	7:44.93	16
Igor Kravtsov; Nikolay Spinyov; Georgy Nikitin; Vladimir Sokolov	Quadruple sculls	6:10.62	3 SF	Bye		5:59.91	4 FB	5:54.98	8
Vladimir Mityushev; Aleksandr Ustinov; Andrei Chevel; Dmitry Kartashov	Lightweight coxless four	6:26.39	3 R	6:00.03	4 FC	did not advance		6:23.59	13
Sergey Matveyev; Andrey Glukhov; Dmitry Rozinkevich; Vladimir Sokolov; Anton Chermashentsev; Vladimir Volodenkov; Nikolay Aksyonov; Roman Monchenko; Pavel Melnikov; Aleksandr Lukyanov	Coxed eight	5:48.63	3 R	5:32.98	2 FA	—N/a		5:45.77	3rd place, bronze medalist(s)

Women

Athlete(s)	Event	Heats		Repechage		Semifinals		Final	
Athlete(s)	Event	Time	Rank	Time	Rank	Time	Rank	Time	Rank
Margarita Bogdanova; Irina Fedotova; Larisa Merk; Oksana Dorodnova	Quadruple sculls	6:37.59	2 R	DNS	4 FB	—N/a		6:24.10	7
Albina Ligacheva; Vera Pochitayeva	Coxless pair	7:42.76	2 SF	Bye		7:36.37	3 FA	DSQ	

=== Sailing ===
Men

Athlete	Event	Race											Score	Rank
Athlete	Event	1	2	3	4	5	6	7	8	9	10	11	Score	Rank
Vladimir Moiseyev	Mistral	(36)	29	27	33	(36)	34	21	26	25			195	31
Oleg Khopyorsky	Finn	(27)	18	13	16	7	(27)	25	10	4	14		107	18
Yevgeny Burmatnov; Dmitry Berezkin	470	13	(25)	5	2	3	1	11	(20)	19	4	8	66	5

Mixed

Athlete	Event	Race											Score	Match Races			Rank
Athlete	Event	1	2	3	4	5	6	7	8	9	10	11	Score	Quarterfinals	Semifinals	Final	Rank
Andrey Kirilyuk	Laser	(36)	25	26	31	(32)	24	29	19	22	20	16	212				29
Yury Konovalov; Sergey Myasnikov	Tornado	11	10	7	12	(18)	3	15	10	8	(17)	11	87				12
Viktor Solovyov; Anatoly Mikhaylin	Star	10	16	(21)	(DNF)	14	15	19	19	7	21		121				17
Georgy Shayduko; Dmitri Shabanov; Igor Skalin	Soling	2	11	(13)	8	7	4	(12)	8	7	3		50	B. Abbott; J. Abbott; Boston (CAN); W 3:0	Madrigali; Barton; Massey (USA); W 3:0	Flach; Schümann; Jäkel (GER); L 0:3	Silver medal

=== Shooting ===
Men

Athlete	Event	Qualification		Final	
Athlete	Event	Score	Rank	Score	Rank
Yevgeni Aleinikov	10 m air rifle	591	4	692.9	4
Vyacheslav Bochkarev	50 m rifle three positions	1163	18	did not advance	
Alexander Danilov	50 m pistol	558	16	did not advance	
Vladimir Isakov	10 m air pistol	579	12	did not advance	
Artem Khadjibekov	10 m air rifle	594	2	695.7 OR	Gold medal
Artem Khadjibekov	50 m rifle three positions	1164	13	did not advance	
Artem Khadjibekov	50 m rifle prone	594	20	did not advance	
Boris Kokorev	50 m pistol	570	1 Q	664.4 OR	Gold medal
Sergei Kovalenko	50 m rifle prone	596	9	did not advance	
Dimitri Lykin	10 m running target	581	2	676.7	5
Sergei Pyzhianov	10 m air pistol	583	5	683.5	4
Nikolai Teplyi	Skeet	122	5	146	5
Yuri Yermolenko	10 m running target	569	9	did not advance	

Women

Athlete	Event	Qualification		Final	
Athlete	Event	Score	Rank	Score	Rank
Svetlana Demina	Double trap	95	17	did not advance	
Irina Gerasimenok	50 m rifle three positions	585	3	680.1	Silver medal
Marina Grigorieva	10 m air rifle	392	13	did not advance	
Olga Klochneva	10 m air pistol	389	2	490.1 OR	Gold medal
Marina Logvinenko	25 m pistol	583	4	684.2	Bronze medal
Marina Logvinenko	10 m air pistol	390 OR	1	488.6	Silver medal
Anna Maloukhina	10 m air rifle	390	20	did not advance	
Anna Maloukhina	50 m rifle three positions	573	26	did not advance	
Yelena Rabaya	Double trap	93	19	did not advance	
Svetlana Smirnova	25 m pistol	576	15	did not advance	

=== Swimming ===
Men

Athlete	Events	Heat		Final	
Athlete	Events	Time	Rank	Time	Rank
Aleksey Akatyev	400 m freestyle	3:56.40	17	3:55.72	Final B 6
Aleksey Akatyev	1500 m freestyle	15:16.47	3 Q	15:21.68	8
Aleksei Butsenin	1500 m freestyle	15:31.27	14	did not advance	
Andrei Ivanov	200 m breaststroke	2:15.56	12	2:14.37	Final B 1
Roman Ivanovsky	100 m breaststroke	1:02.69	11	Disqualify	
Aleksei Kolesnikov	200 m butterfly	2:00.77	18	did not advance	
Andrey Korneyev	200 m breaststroke	2:14.11	2 Q	2:13.17	Bronze medal
Vladislav Kulikov	100 m butterfly	53.54	8 Q	53.13	Bronze medal
Stanislav Lopukhov	100 m breaststroke	1:02.00	6 Q	1:02.13	8
Sergey Ostapchuk	200 m backstroke	2:03.50	18	2:03.91	Final B 8
Denis Pankratov	100 m butterfly	52.96	2 Q	52.27 WR	Gold medal
Denis Pankratov	200 m butterfly	1:58.28	4 Q	1:56.51	Gold medal
Alexander Popov	50 m freestyle	22.22	1 Q	22.22	Gold medal
Alexander Popov	100 m freestyle	48.74	1 Q	48.74	Gold medal
Vladimir Predkin	50 m freestyle	23.03	20	did not advance	
Vladimir Predkin	100 m freestyle	50.75	24	did not advance	
Vladimir Pyshnenko	200 m freestyle	1:49.79	12	1:49.55	Final B 3
Vladimir Selkov	100 m backstroke	55.87	9	Did Not Start	
Vladimir Selkov	200 m backstroke	2:01.32	9	Did Not Start	
Denis Pimankov; Alexander Popov; Vladimir Predkin; Vladimir Pyshnenko; Konstantin Ushkov; Roman Yegorov	4 × 100 m freestyle	3:20.39	5 Q	3:17.06	Silver medal
Roman Ivanovsky; Vladislav Kulikov; Stanislav Lopukhov; Denis Pankratov; Alexander Popov; Vladimir Selkov; Roman Yegorov	4 × 100 m medley	3:41.49	5 Q	3:37.55	Silver medal

Women

Athlete	Events	Heat		Final	
Athlete	Events	Time	Rank	Time	Rank
Nadezhda Chemezova	400 m freestyle	4:21.33	23	did not advance	
Olga Kochetkova	100 m backstroke	1:03.17	11	1:03.52	Final B 4
Olga Landik	100 m breaststroke	1:12.55	27	did not advance	
Tatyana Litovchenko	200 m freestyle	2:04.09	22	did not advance	
Yelena Makarova	200 m breaststroke	2:33.74	22	did not advance	
Natalya Meshcheryakova	50 m freestyle	25.73	6 Q	25.88	8
Natalya Meshcheryakova	100 m freestyle	56.33	13	56.17	Final B 5
Yelena Nazemnova	100 m butterfly	1:01.54	15	1:00.93	Final B 2
Svetlana Pozdeyeva	100 m butterfly	1:01.29	13	1:01.62	Final B 8
Darya Shmelyova	200 m medley	2:20.34	26	did not advance	
Darya Shmelyova	400 m medley	4:57.06	26	did not advance	
Nina Zhivanevskaya	100 m backstroke	1:02.94	9	1:02.38	Final B 1
Nina Zhivanevskaya	200 m backstroke	2:13.32	5 Q	2:14.59	8
Svetlana Leshukova; Natalya Meshcheryakova; Yelena Nazemnova; Natalya Sorokina	4 × 100 m freestyle	3:47.33	7 Q	Disqualify	
Nadezhda Chemezova; Tatyana Litovchenko; Yelena Nazemnova; Inna Yaitskaya	4 × 200 m freestyle	8:16.06	12	did not advance	
Yelena Makarova; Natalya Meshcheryakova; Yelena Nazemnova; Svetlana Pozdeyeva; Nina Zhivanevskaya	4 × 200 m freestyle	4:10.65	8 Q	4:10.56	7

=== Synchronized swimming ===
Athlete	Event	Technical Routine		Free Routine			
Athlete	Event	Points	Rank	Points	Rank	Total Points	Rank
Yelena Antonova; Yelena Azarova; Olga Brusnikina; Mariya Kiselyova; Marina Lobova; Galina Maksimova; Olga Novokshchenova; Yuliya Pankratova; Olga Sedakova; Anna Yuryayeva	Team	97.000	4	97.400	4	97.260	4

=== Table tennis ===
Men

Athlete	Event	Group	Round 1	Quarterfinals	Semifinals	Final
Athlete	Event	Opposition Result	Opposition Result	Opposition Result	Opposition Result	Opposition Result
Dmitry Mazunov	Singles	Hodžić (BIH); W 2-0; Butler (USA); W 2-0; Karlsson (SWE); W 2-0	Samsonov (BLR); L 0-3	did not advance		
Andrei Mazunov	Singles	Prean (GBR); W 2-1; Hylton (JAM); W 2-0; Samsonov (BLR); L 1-2	did not advance			
Andrei Mazunov; Dmitry Mazunov	Doubles	Samsonov (BLR); Shchetinin (BLR); W 2-0; Butler (USA); Sweeris (USA); W 2-0; Lee (KOR); Yoo (KOR); L 0-2		did not advance		

Women

Athlete	Event	Group	Round 1	Quarterfinals	Semifinals	Final
Athlete	Event	Opposition Result	Opposition Result	Opposition Result	Opposition Result	Opposition Result
Irina Palina	Singles	Dobešová (CZE); W 2-0; Alejo (DOM); W 2-0; Koyama (JPN); L 1-2	did not advance			
Elena Timina	Singles	Schöpp (GER); L 0-2; Kim (PRK); L 0-2; Oshonaike (NGR); W 2-0	did not advance			
Irina Palina; Elena Timina	Doubles	Kaffo (NGR); Oshonaike (NGR); W 2-0; Noor (NED); Vriesekoop (NED); W 2-0; Wang (USA); Yip (USA); W 2-0		Park (KOR); Ryu (KOR); L 1-3	did not advance	

=== Tennis ===
Men

Athlete	Event	Round of 64	Round of 32	Round of 16	Quarterfinals	Semifinals	Final	Rank
Athlete	Event	Opposition / score	Opposition / score	Opposition / score	Opposition / score	Opposition / score	Opposition / score	Rank
Andrei Olhovskiy	Singles	Lapentti (ECU); W 6–1, 3–6, 8–6	Vacek (CZE) (16); W 6–3, 7-6(1)	Ruud (NOR); W 6–4, 6-3	Meligeni (BRA) (2); L 7–6(5), 5–7, 3-6	Did not advance		

Women

Athlete	Event	Round of 64	Round of 32	Round of 16	Quarterfinals	Semifinals	Final	Rank
Athlete	Event	Opposition / score	Opposition / score	Opposition / score	Opposition / score	Opposition / score	Opposition / score	Rank
Elena Makarova	Singles	Labat (ARG); L 2–6, 5-7	Did not advance					
Anna Kournikova	Singles	Courtois (BEL); L 6–1, 2–6, 2–6	Did not advance					
Elena Likhovtseva	Singles	Fernández (USA) (7); L 2–6, 4-6	Did not advance					
Anna Kournikova; Elena Makarova	Doubles		Novotná (CZE); Suková (CZE) (2); L 2–6, 2-6	Did not advance				

=== Volleyball ===
==== Indoor ====
Men's team

#	Name	Club	Date of Birth
	Oleg Shatunov		February 21, 1967 (age 29)
	Vadim Khamuttskikh		November 26, 1969 (age 26)
	Sergei Orlenko		February 10, 1971 (age 25)
	Ruslan Olikhver		April 11, 1969 (age 27)
	Aleksey Kazakov		March 18, 1976 (age 20)
	Dmitry Fomin		January 21, 1968 (age 28)
	Sergey Tetyukhin		September 23, 1975 (age 20)
	Pavel Shishkin		April 11, 1970 (age 26)
	Konstantin Ushakov		March 24, 1970 (age 26)
	Stanislav Dineykin		October 10, 1973 (age 22)
	Igor Shulepov		November 16, 1972 (age 23)
	Valeri Goryushev		April 26, 1974 (age 22)

Head coach: Viacheslav Platonov

Preliminary round

Rk	Team	Points	Won	Lost	SW	SL	Ratio	PW	PL	Ratio
1	Italy	10	5	0	15	0	MAX	225	138	1.630
2	Netherlands	9	4	1	12	3	4.000	209	131	1.595
3	Yugoslavia	8	3	2	9	8	1.125	215	191	1.126
4	Russia	7	2	3	7	9	0.777	196	201	0.975
5	South Korea	6	1	4	3	12	0.250	156	198	0.788
6	Tunisia	5	0	5	1	15	0.067	98	240	0.408

July 21, 1996	Yugoslavia	3–1	Russia	Referees: Takashi Shimoyama (Japan)
July 21, 1996	(10–15, 15–13, 15–10, 15–11)			Referees: Takashi Shimoyama (Japan)

July 23, 1996	Russia	0–3	Netherlands	Referees: Jarmo Salonen (Finland)
July 23, 1996	(9–15, 9–15, 9–15)			Referees: Jarmo Salonen (Finland)

July 25, 1996	South Korea	0–3	Russia	Referees: Peter Henry (Canada)
July 25, 1996	(8–15, 4–15, 14–16)			Referees: Peter Henry (Canada)

July 27, 1996	Russia	0–3	Italy	Referees: Frank Leuthaeusser (Germany)
July 27, 1996	(11–15, 6–15, 12–15)			Referees: Frank Leuthaeusser (Germany)

July 29, 1996	Tunisia	0–3	Russia	Referees: Thomas Blue (United States)
July 29, 1996	(9–15, 10–15, 11–15)			Referees: Thomas Blue (United States)

Quarterfinals

July 31, 1996	Cuba	0–3	Russia	Referees: Takashi Shimoyama (Japan)
July 31, 1996	(13–15, 15–17, 11–15)			Referees: Takashi Shimoyama (Japan)

Semifinals

August 2, 1996	Russia	0–3	Netherlands	Referees: Jose Sanler Diaz (Cuba)
August 2, 1996	(6–15, 6–15, 10–15)			Referees: Jose Sanler Diaz (Cuba)

Bronze medal match

August 4, 1996	Russia	1–3	Yugoslavia	Referees: Takashi Shimoyama (Japan)
August 4, 1996	(8–15, 15–7, 8–15, 9–15)			Referees: Takashi Shimoyama (Japan)

Women's team

#	Name	Club	Date of Birth
	Valentina Ogienko		May 26, 1965 (age 31)
	Natalya Morozova		January 28, 1973 (age 25)
	Marina Nikoulina		March 3, 1963 (age 33)
	Elena Batoukhtina		April 11, 1969 (age 27)
	Irina Ilchenko		August 3, 1968 (age 27)
	Yelena Godina		September 17, 1977 (age 18)
	Tatyana Menshova		January 27, 1970 (age 26)
	Yevgeniya Artamonova		July 17, 1975 (age 21)
	Elizaveta Tishchenko		February 7, 1975 (age 21)
	Yulia Timonova		June 12, 1973 (age 23)
	Tatyana Gracheva		February 23, 1973 (age 23)
	Lioubov Sokolova		December 4, 1977 (age 18)

Head coach: Nikolay Karpol

Preliminary round

	Team	Points	G	W	L	PW	PL	Ratio	SW	SL	Ratio
1.	Brazil	10	5	5	0	238	121	1.967	15	1	15.000
2.	Russia	9	5	4	1	217	140	1.550	12	4	3.000
3.	Cuba	8	5	3	2	196	156	1.256	10	6	1.667
4.	Germany	7	5	2	3	163	191	0.853	7	9	0.778
5.	Canada	6	5	1	4	156	239	0.653	3	14	0.214
6.	Peru	5	5	0	5	129	252	0.512	2	15	0.133

July 20, 1996	Russia	3–0	Germany	Referees: Konstantinos Margaritis (Greece)
July 20, 1996	(15–5, 15–10, 15–7)			Referees: Konstantinos Margaritis (Greece)

July 22, 1996	Russia	3–0	Canada	Referees: Songsak Chareonpong (Thailand)
July 22, 1996	(15–1, 15–7, 15–9)			Referees: Songsak Chareonpong (Thailand)

July 24, 1996	Brazil	3–0	Russia	Referees: Songsak Chareonpong (Thailand)
July 24, 1996	(15–3, 15–11, 15–13)			Referees: Songsak Chareonpong (Thailand)

July 26, 1996	Russia	3–0	Peru	Referees: Thomas Blue (United States)
July 26, 1996	(15–11, 15–8, 15–1)			Referees: Thomas Blue (United States)

July 28, 1996	Cuba	1–3	Russia	Referees: Takashi Shimoyama (Japan)
July 28, 1996	(15–10, 6–15, 7–15, 8–15)			Referees: Takashi Shimoyama (Japan)

Quarterfinals

July 30, 1996	Netherlands	1–3	Russia	Referees: Konstantinos Margaritis (Greece)
July 30, 1996	(15–10, 7–15, 9–15, 10–15)			Referees: Konstantinos Margaritis (Greece)

Semifinals

August 1, 1996	China	3–1	Russia	Referees: Peter Henry (Canada)
August 1, 1996	(12–15, 15–5, 15–8, 15–12)			Referees: Peter Henry (Canada)

Bronze medal match

August 3, 1996	Russia	2–3	Brazil	Referees: Barry Dragon (United States)
August 3, 1996	(13–15, 15–4, 14–16, 15–8, 13–15)			Referees: Barry Dragon (United States)

=== Water polo ===
Men's team

Vladimir Karabutov, Dmitry Gorshkov, Nikolay Kozlov, Dmitri Douguine, Serguei Garbouzov, Nikolai Maximov, Alexander Yerishev, Dmitri Apanasenko, Sergey Ivlev, Ilya Konstantinov, Aleksey Panfili, Sergey Yevstigneyev, Yury Smolovoy

Qualified for the quarterfinals
Will play for places 9-12

Preliminary round

Team	Pld	W	D	L	GF	GA	GD	Pts
Hungary	5	5	0	0	47	38	+9	10
Yugoslavia	5	3	1	1	46	44	+2	7
Spain	5	3	0	2	39	33	+6	6
Russia	5	2	1	2	42	38	+4	5
Germany	5	1	0	3	36	45	-9	2
Netherlands	5	0	0	5	36	48	-12	0

July 20, 1996	Hungary	8–7	Russia	Referees: Kerr (AUS), Merola (ITA)
July 20, 1996	Score by quarters: 1-2, 1-3, 4-1, 2-1			Referees: Kerr (AUS), Merola (ITA)
July 20, 1996	Kásás, Benedek 2	Goals	Panfili, Kozlov, Gorshkov 2	Referees: Kerr (AUS), Merola (ITA)

July 21, 1996	Yugoslavia	9–9	Russia	Referees: Iliadis (GRE), Keman (NED)
July 21, 1996	Score by quarters: 3-3, 1-1, 4-2, 1-3			Referees: Iliadis (GRE), Keman (NED)
July 21, 1996	Šapić, Jelenić, Vujasinović 2	Goals	Gorshkov 4	Referees: Iliadis (GRE), Keman (NED)

July 22, 1996	Russia	10–8	Germany	Referees: Simons (BEL), Merola (ITA)
July 22, 1996	Score by quarters: 3-2, 3-3, 2-1, 2-2			Referees: Simons (BEL), Merola (ITA)
July 22, 1996	Garbouzov 4	Goals	four players 2	Referees: Simons (BEL), Merola (ITA)

July 23, 1996	Netherlands	5–10	Russia	Referees: Klaric (CRO), Martinez (CUB)
July 23, 1996	Score by quarters: 2-2, 0-3, 1-2, 2-3			Referees: Klaric (CRO), Martinez (CUB)
July 23, 1996	five players 1	Goals	four players 2	Referees: Klaric (CRO), Martinez (CUB)

July 24, 1996	Russia	6–8	Spain	Referees: Keman (NED), Bernard (USA)
July 24, 1996	Score by quarters: 3-2, 0-2, 3-3, 0-1			Referees: Keman (NED), Bernard (USA)
July 24, 1996	six players 1	Goals	Oca 3	Referees: Keman (NED), Bernard (USA)

Quarterfinals

July 26, 1996	Russia	6–8	Italy	Referees: Ludecke (GER), Simons (BEL)
July 26, 1996	Score by quarters: 4-4, 3-2, 1-3, 1-2			Referees: Ludecke (GER), Simons (BEL)
July 26, 1996	Yerishev 3	Goals	four players 2	Referees: Ludecke (GER), Simons (BEL)

Classification 5/8 place

July 27, 1996	Yugoslavia	15–16 (OT)	Russia	Referees: Tellegen (NED), Simons (BEL)
July 27, 1996	Score by quarters: 5-4, 1-2, 3-3, 3-3 OT: 3-4			Referees: Tellegen (NED), Simons (BEL)
July 27, 1996	Uskoković 4	Goals	Apanasenko 4	Referees: Tellegen (NED), Simons (BEL)

Classification 5/6 place

July 28, 1996	Greece	8–10 (OT)	Russia	Referees: Demey (FRA), Merola (ITA)
July 28, 1996	Score by quarters: 2-2, 1-1, 1-2, 3-2 OT: 1-3			Referees: Demey (FRA), Merola (ITA)
July 28, 1996	Afroudakis 3	Goals	Kozlov, Yerishev 2	Referees: Demey (FRA), Merola (ITA)

=== Weightlifting ===
Men

Athlete	Event	Snatch		Clean & Jerk		Total	Rank
Athlete	Event	Result	Rank	Result	Rank	Total	Rank
Umar Edelkhanov	-64 kg	132.5 kg	13	162.5 kg	10	295.0 kg	11
Sergey Filimonov	-76 kg	160.0 kg	8	185.0 kg	8	345.0 kg	7
Aleksei Petrov	-91 kg	187.5 kg	1	215.0 kg	3	402.5 kg	Gold medal
Igor Alekseyev	-91 kg	182.5 kg	2	205.0 kg	9	387.5 kg	5
Vyacheslav Rubin	-99 kg	175.0 kg	7	215.0 kg	4	390.0 kg	5
Dmitry Smirnov	-99 kg	175.0 kg	8	215.0 kg	5	390.0 kg	6
Sergey Syrtsov	-108 kg	195.0 kg	2	225.0 kg	2	420.0 kg	Silver medal
Sergey Flerko	-108 kg	185.0 kg	6	No Mark		Did not finish	
Andrei Chemerkin	+108 kg	197.5 kg	3	260.0 kg	1	457.5 kg	Gold medal

=== Wrestling ===
Men's Freestyle

Athlete	Event	Round 1	Eightfinals	Quarterfinals	Semifinals	Final	Repechage 2 Round	Repechage 3 Round	Repechage 4 Round	Repechage 5 Round	Repechage 6 Round	Bronze Medal Finals	Rank
Athlete	Event	Opposition Result	Opposition Result	Opposition Result	Opposition Result	Opposition Result	Opposition Result	Opposition Result	Opposition Result	Opposition Result	Opposition Result	Opposition Result	Rank
Vougar Oroudjov	−48 kg	Yefteni (UKR); L 4-6	did not advance				Ragusa (CAN); W 12-0	Fernández (MEX); W 10-0	Eiter (USA); W 10-4	Corduneanu (ROU); W 10-0	Jung (KOR); W 5-1	Vila (CUB); L 2-5	4
Chechenol Mongush	−52 kg	Corduneanu (ROU); W 11-4	Yordanov (BUL); L 2-4	did not advance				Toguzov (UKR); W 2-1	Achilov (UZB); W 4-0		Mohammadi (IRI); W 3-1	Mamyrov (KAZ); L 2-3	4
Bagavdin Oumakhanov	−57 kg	Liuzzi (ITA); W 4-0	Sissaouri (CAN); L 1-1	did not advance				Fyodorov (KAZ); W 5-2	Talaei (IRI); L 0-1	Did not advance			
Magomed Azizov	−62 kg	Vath (CAM); W 10-0	Scheibe (GER); W 8-2		Brands (USA); L 1-4	did not advance					Wada (JPN); L 0-10	5/6 places Schillaci (ITA); W 0-0	5
Vadim Bogiyev	−68 kg		Fadzaev (UZB); W 3-1	Zazirov (UKR); W 6-4	Hwang (KOR); W 3-2	Saunders (USA); W 1-1							Gold medal
Buvaisar Saitiev	−74 kg	Momeni (IRI); W 8-0	Leipold (GER); W 3-1		Monday (USA); W 6-1	Park (KOR); W 5-0							Gold medal
Khadzhimurad Magomedov	−82 kg	Diouf (SEN); W 3-0	Ramos (CUB); W 7-4		Khadem (IRI); W 4-0	Yang (KOR); W 2-1							Gold medal
Makharbek Khadartsev	−90 kg	Bhola Bhala (PAK); W 10-0		Douglas (USA); W 4-1	Lohyňa (SVK); W 7-1	Khadem (IRI); L 0-3							Silver medal
Leri Khabelov	−100 kg	Tkeshelashvili (GEO); W 2-0	Jadidi (IRI); L 0-4	did not advance				Ladik (CAN); L 0-0	Did not advance				
Andrey Shumilin	−130 kg	Klimov (KAZ); W 4-1	Baumgartner (USA); W 6-1		Demir (TUR); L 0-1	did not advance					Kovalevsky (KGZ); W 3-0	Baumgartner (USA); L 1-1	4

Men's Greco-Roman

Athlete	Event	Round 1	Eightfinals	Quarterfinals	Semifinals	Final	Repechage 2 Round	Repechage 3 Round	Repechage 4 Round	Repechage 5 Round	Repechage 6 Round	Bronze Medal Finals	Rank
Athlete	Event	Opposition Result	Opposition Result	Opposition Result	Opposition Result	Opposition Result	Opposition Result	Opposition Result	Opposition Result	Opposition Result	Opposition Result	Opposition Result	Rank
Zafar Guliyev	−48 kg	Kado (JPN); W 3-2	Sim (KOR); L 1-2	did not advance				Maynard (USA); W 6-0	Özdemir (TUR); W 7-0		Papashvili (GEO); W 6-0	Kang (PRK); W 4-0	Bronze medal
Samvel Danielyan	−52 kg	Khudoyberdiev (UZB); W 11-4	Jabłoński (POL); W 8-0	Nazaryan (ARM); L 0-3	did not advance				Dyusenov (KAZ); W 11-0		Rivas (CUB); W 9-8	Kalashnykov (UKR); L 1-4	4
Aleksandr Ignatenko	−57 kg	Melnichenko (KAZ); L 0-11	did not advance				Elgkian (GRE); L 2-3	did not advance					
Sergei Martynov	−62 kg	Choi (KOR); W 3-0	Marén (CUB); L 4-5	did not advance			Zuniga (USA); W 6-6	Guliashvili (GEO); L 2-7	did not advance				
Aleksandr Tretyakov	−68 kg	Yalouz (FRA); L 0-8	did not advance				Magnusson (SWE); W 9-2	Adzhi (UKR); W 3-1	Manukyan (ARM); W 5-0	Nikitin (EST); W 4-0	Pulyayev (UZB); W 6-0	Madzhidov (BLR); W 4-0	Bronze medal
Mnatsakan Iskandaryan	−74 kg	García (VEN); W 10-0	Kim (KOR); W 4-0		Azcuy (CUB); L 4-5	Did not advance					Hahn (GER); L 5-8	5/6 places Dzyhasov (UKR); W 0-0	5
Sergey Tsvir	−82 kg	Farkas (HUN); W 3-0	Zander (GER); L 0-4	did not advance				Park (KOR); W 11-0	Tsilent (BLR); L 0-10	did not advance			
Georgi Koguashvili	−90 kg	Başar (TUR); L 1-6	did not advance				Eom (KOR); W 4-0	Gelénesi (HUN); L 1-2	did not advance				
Teymuraz Edisherashvili	−100 kg	Suárez (VEN); W 6-0	Saldadze (UKR); L 3-6	did not advance				Gleasman (USA); W 4-1	Damjanović (CRO); W 5-0	Manov (BUL); W 3-1	Milián (CUB); W 1-0	Ljungberg (SWE); L 0-3	4
Alexander Karelin	−130 kg	Ayari (TUN); W 10-0	Mureiko (MDA); W 2-0	Ahokas (FIN); W 4-0	Poikilidis (GRE); W 8-0	Ghaffari (USA); W 1-0							Gold medal
