= Wrestling at the 1996 Summer Olympics – Men's Greco-Roman 100 kg =

Men's Greco-Roman 100 kg at the Games of the XXVI Olympiad
- Venue: Georgia World Congress Center
- Dates: 20–21 July 1996
- Competitors: 20 from 20 nations

Medalists
1st place, gold medalist(s)		Andrzej Wroński	Poland
2nd place, silver medalist(s)		Sergey Lishtvan	Belarus
3rd place, bronze medalist(s)		Mikael Ljungberg	Sweden

The men's Greco-Roman 100 kilograms at the 1996 Summer Olympics as part of the wrestling program were held at the Georgia World Congress Center from July 20 to July 21. The gold and silver medalists were determined by the final match of the main single-elimination bracket. The losers advanced to the repechage. These matches determined the bronze medalist for the event.

== Results ==
Legend

- WO — Won by walkover

=== Round 1 ===
	Score		CP
1/16 finals
Takashi Nonomura (JPN)	0–10	Mikael Ljungberg (SWE)	0–4 ST
Stipe Damjanović (CRO)	6–0	Mohamed Basri (MAR)	3–0 PO
Teymuraz Edisherashvili (RUS)	6–0	Emilio Suárez (VEN)	3–0 PO
Juan Giraldo (COL)	0–4 Fall	Georgiy Saldadze (UKR)	0–4 TO
Sergey Lishtvan (BLR)	2–0	Todor Manov (BUL)	3–0 PO
Jason Gleasman (USA)	15–2	Ba Yanchuan (CHN)	4–1 SP
Héctor Milián (CUB)	12–0	Colbie Bell (CAN)	4–0 ST
Giuseppe Giunta (ITA)	1–1	Bakur Gogitidze (GEO)	3–1 PP
Igor Grabovetchi (MDA)	4–1	Urs Bürgler (SUI)	3–1 PP
Andrzej Wroński (POL)	10–0	Mohamed Naouar (TUN)	4–0 ST

=== Round 2 ===
	Score		CP
1/8 finals
Mikael Ljungberg (SWE)	5–0	Stipe Damjanović (CRO)	3–0 PO
Teymuraz Edisherashvili (RUS)	3–6	Georgiy Saldadze (UKR)	1–3 PP
Sergey Lishtvan (BLR)	3–0	Jason Gleasman (USA)	3–0 PO
Héctor Milián (CUB)	3–0	Giuseppe Giunta (ITA)	3–0 PO
Igor Grabovetchi (MDA)	0–0	Andrzej Wroński (POL)	0–3 PO
Repechage
Takashi Nonomura (JPN)	10–0	Mohamed Basri (MAR)	4–0 ST
Emilio Suárez (VEN)	3–0	Juan Giraldo (COL)	3–0 PO
Todor Manov (BUL)	4–0	Ba Yanchuan (CHN)	3–0 PO
Colbie Bell (CAN)	0–3	Bakur Gogitidze (GEO)	0–3 PO
Urs Bürgler (SUI)	11–0	Mohamed Naouar (TUN)	4–0 ST

=== Round 3 ===
	Score		CP
Quarterfinals
Mikael Ljungberg (SWE)	5–0 Fall	Georgiy Saldadze (UKR)	4–0 TO
Sergey Lishtvan (BLR)		Bye	
Héctor Milián (CUB)		Bye	
Andrzej Wroński (POL)		Bye	
Repechage
Takashi Nonomura (JPN)	3–0	Emilio Suárez (VEN)	3–0 PO
Todor Manov (BUL)	3–0	Bakur Gogitidze (GEO)	3–0 PO
Urs Bürgler (SUI)	3–6	Stipe Damjanović (CRO)	1–3 PP
Teymuraz Edisherashvili (RUS)	4–1	Jason Gleasman (USA)	3–1 PP
Giuseppe Giunta (ITA)	2–3	Igor Grabovetchi (MDA)	1–3 PP

=== Round 4 ===
	Score		CP
Semifinals
Mikael Ljungberg (SWE)	1–2	Sergey Lishtvan (BLR)	1–3 PP
Héctor Milián (CUB)	0–2	Andrzej Wroński (POL)	0–3 PO
Repechage
Takashi Nonomura (JPN)	0–2	Todor Manov (BUL)	0–3 PO
Stipe Damjanović (CRO)	0–5	Teymuraz Edisherashvili (RUS)	0–3 PO
Igor Grabovetchi (MDA)	2–2	Georgiy Saldadze (UKR)	3–1 PP

=== Round 5 ===
	Score		CP
Repechage
Todor Manov (BUL)	1–3	Teymuraz Edisherashvili (RUS)	1–3 PP
Igor Grabovetchi (MDA)		Bye	

=== Round 6 ===
	Score		CP
Repechage
Mikael Ljungberg (SWE)	5–0 Ret	Igor Grabovetchi (MDA)	4–0 PA
Teymuraz Edisherashvili (RUS)	1–0	Héctor Milián (CUB)	3–0 PO

=== Finals ===
	Score		CP
Classification 7th–8th
Todor Manov (BUL)	WO	Georgiy Saldadze (UKR)	0–4 PA
Classification 5th–6th
Igor Grabovetchi (MDA)	WO	Héctor Milián (CUB)	0–4 PA
Bronze medal match
Mikael Ljungberg (SWE)	3–0 Fall	Teymuraz Edisherashvili (RUS)	4–0 TO
Gold medal match
Sergey Lishtvan (BLR)	0–0	Andrzej Wroński (POL)	0–3 PO

== Final standing ==
Rank	Athlete
1st place, gold medalist(s)	Andrzej Wroński (POL)
2nd place, silver medalist(s)	Sergey Lishtvan (BLR)
3rd place, bronze medalist(s)	Mikael Ljungberg (SWE)
4	Teymuraz Edisherashvili (RUS)
5	Héctor Milián (CUB)
6	Igor Grabovetchi (MDA)
7	Georgiy Saldadze (UKR)
8	Todor Manov (BUL)
9	Takashi Nonomura (JPN)
10	Stipe Damjanović (CRO)
11	Urs Bürgler (SUI)
12	Jason Gleasman (USA)
13	Giuseppe Giunta (ITA)
14	Bakur Gogitidze (GEO)
15	Emilio Suárez (VEN)
16	Ba Yanchuan (CHN)
17	Colbie Bell (CAN)
17	Juan Giraldo (COL)
17	Mohamed Basri (MAR)
17	Mohamed Naouar (TUN)
