= Wrestling at the 1997 Bolivarian Games =

This page shows the results of the Wrestling Competition at the 1997 Bolivarian Games, held in Arequipa, Peru.

== Men's competition ==
=== Greco-Roman ===
event	gold	silver	bronze
54 kg	VEN David Ochoa	PER Fredy Tineo	ECU Abel Contreras
58 kg	COL Víctor Capacho	BOL Richard Corrales	PER José Paico
63 kg	PER Enrique Cubas	PAN Tomiaky Castillo	VEN Winston Santos
69 kg	COL José Escobar	VEN José Alberto Díaz	ECU Fernando Navarro
76 kg	VEN Antonio García	COL Luis Izquierdo	PER Carlos Albrecht
85 kg	VEN Eddy Bartolozzi	ECU Sebastián Ruíz	PER Lucio Vázquez
97 kg	VEN Emilio Suárez	COL Arnulfo Hernández	PER Félix Isisola
125 kg	VEN Rafael Barreno	PER Juan Cruz	COL Juan Giraldo

=== Freestyle ===
event	gold	silver	bronze
54 kg	VEN José Barreto	PER Freddy Tineo	PAN Víctor Ledezma
58 kg	COL Luis Cortez	VEN Davos Ortiz	PAN Edgar Castillo
63 kg	PER Enrique Cubas	COL Edison Hurtado	VEN Edy Azuaje
69 kg	VEN Juan Suárez	PER David Cubas	PAN Leonardo González
76 kg	VEN Lucas Barrera	PAN Herminio Hidalgo	COL Rafael Paredes
85 kg	VEN José Meléndez	PER Félix Isisola	ECU Sebastián Ruíz
97 kg	PER Lucio Vázquez	COL Arnulfo Hernández	VEN Edgar Becerra
125 kg	COL Juan Giraldo	PERJuan Cruz	VEN Juan García
