= Swimming at the 1996 Summer Olympics – Women's 100 metre butterfly =

Women's 100 metre butterfly at the Games of the XXVI Olympiad
- Venue: Georgia Tech Aquatic Center
- Date: 21 July 1996 (heats & finals)
- Competitors: 44 from 36 nations
- Winning time: 59.13

Medalists
1st place, gold medalist(s)		Amy Van Dyken	United States
2nd place, silver medalist(s)		Liu Limin	China
3rd place, bronze medalist(s)		Angel Martino	United States

The women's 100 metre butterfly event at the 1996 Summer Olympics took place on 24 July at the Georgia Tech Aquatic Center in Atlanta, United States.

== Records ==
Prior to this competition, the existing world and Olympic records were as follows.

World record	Mary T. Meagher (USA)	57.93	Brown Deer, United States	16 August 1981
Olympic record	Qian Hong (CHN)	58.62	Barcelona, Spain	29 July 1992

== Results ==
=== Heats ===
Rule: The eight fastest swimmers advance to final A (Q), while the next eight to final B (q).

Rank	Heat	Lane	Name	Nationality	Time	Notes
1	5	4	Angel Martino	United States	59.31	Q
2	6	3	Amy Van Dyken	United States	1:00.04	Q
3	6	5	Liu Limin	China	1:00.18	Q
4	6	4	Ayari Aoyama	Japan	1:00.20	Q
5	5	5	Susie O'Neill	Australia	1:00.55	Q
6	4	4	Hitomi Kashima	Japan	1:00.85	Q
7	4	5	Cai Huijue	China	1:00.89	Q
8	4	3	Mette Jacobsen	Denmark	1:00.91	Q
9	5	2	Johanna Sjöberg	Sweden	1:01.01	q
10	4	2	Gabrielle Rose	Brazil	1:01.22	q, SA
11	5	7	Sophia Skou	Denmark	1:01.25	q
12	6	6	Svetlana Pozdeyeva	Russia	1:01.29	q
13	6	2	Sarah Evanetz	Canada	1:01.32	q
14	4	7	Julia Voitovitsch	Germany	1:01.47	q
15	5	1	Yelena Nazemnova	Russia	1:01.54	q
16	4	6	Cécile Jeanson	France	1:01.58	q
17	5	6	Ilaria Tocchini	Italy	1:01.83	
18	5	3	Angela Kennedy	Australia	1:01.89	
19	6	7	María Peláez	Spain	1:01.99	
20	3	7	Nataliya Zolotukhina	Ukraine	1:02.18	NR
21	3	5	Anna Uryniuk	Poland	1:02.39	
22	3	3	Marja Pärssinen	Finland	1:02.53	
23	4	8	Loredana Zisu	Romania	1:02.66	
24	4	1	Joscelin Yeo	Singapore	1:02.71	
25	6	8	Jessica Amey	Canada	1:02.81	
26	2	5	Ana Francisco	Portugal	1:02.98	
27	5	8	Caroline Foot	Great Britain	1:03.04	
28	3	8	Praphalsai Minpraphal	Thailand	1:03.35	
29	3	1	Eydis Konráðsdóttir	Iceland	1:03.41	NR
30	3	2	Mandy Loots	South Africa	1:03.53	
31	3	6	Edit Klocker	Hungary	1:03.61	
32	3	4	Marion Madine	Ireland	1:03.80	
33	2	3	Marcela Kubalčíková	Czech Republic	1:03.82	
34	1	5	María del Pilar Pereyra	Argentina	1:03.98	NR
35	2	7	Natalya Baranovskaya	Belarus	1:04.09	
36	2	8	Taryn Ashton	South Africa	1:04.11	
37	2	2	Nataša Meškovska	Macedonia	1:04.25	
38	2	4	Hsieh Shu-ting	Chinese Taipei	1:04.39	
39	1	3	Dita Želvienė	Lithuania	1:04.63	
40	2	1	Marina Karystinou	Greece	1:05.05	
41	1	4	Park Woo-hee	South Korea	1:05.36	
42	2	6	Gabrijela Ujčić	Croatia	1:06.85	
	1	6	Monica Dahl	Namibia	DNS	
	6	1	Sandra Völker	Germany	DNS	

=== Finals ===
==== Final B ====
Rank	Lane	Name	Nationality	Time	Notes
9	4	Johanna Sjöberg	Sweden	1:00.76	NR
10	1	Yelena Nazemnova	Russia	1:00.93	
11	3	Sophia Skou	Denmark	1:00.95	
12	7	Julia Voitovitsch	Germany	1:01.14	
13	8	Cécile Jeanson	France	1:01.20	
14	5	Gabrielle Rose	Brazil	1:01.39	
15	2	Sarah Evanetz	Canada	1:01.44	
16	6	Svetlana Pozdeyeva	Russia	1:01.62	

==== Final A ====
Rank	Lane	Name	Nationality	Time	Notes
1st place, gold medalist(s)	5	Amy Van Dyken	United States	59.13	
2nd place, silver medalist(s)	3	Liu Limin	China	59.14	
3rd place, bronze medalist(s)	4	Angel Martino	United States	59.23	
4	7	Hitomi Kashima	Japan	1:00.11	
5	2	Susie O'Neill	Australia	1:00.17	
6	6	Ayari Aoyama	Japan	1:00.18	
7	1	Cai Huijue	China	1:00.46	
8	8	Mette Jacobsen	Denmark	1:00.76	
