= Juan Giraldo =

Juan Giraldo can refer to:

- Juan Giraldo (footballer) (born 1998), Colombian footballer
- Juan Giraldo (wrestler) (born 1974), Colombian Olympic wrestler
