= Naumkin =

Naumkin (Russian: Наумкин) is a Russian masculine surname, its feminine counterpart is Naumkina. It may refer to

- Dmitri Naumkin (born 1976), Russian ice dancer
- Vitaly Naumkin (born 1945), Russian academic
- Yuriy Naumkin (born 1968), Russian long jumper
