= Mohamed Basri =

Mohamed Basri may refer to:

- Fqih Basri (1927–2003), political activist and Moroccan regime opponent
- Mohamed Basri (wrestler) (born 1971), Moroccan wrestler
- M. Basri (1942–2026), Indonesian football manager
