= Gogitidze =

Gogitidze (Georgian: გოგიტიძე) is a Georgian surname. It may refer to

- Bakouri Gogitidze, Georgian mixed martial artist
- Bakur Gogitidze (born 1973), Georgian wrestler
- Megi Gogitidze (born 1989), Georgian singer-songwriter and composer
