= Ken Lewis =

Ken, Kenneth, or Kenny Lewis may refer to:

- Ken Lewis (executive) (born 1947), former head of Bank of America
- Ken Lewis (songwriter) (1940–2015), English singer, songwriter and record producer
- Ken Lewis (cricketer) (1928–2026), Welsh cricketer
- Ken Lewis (musician), American record producer, mixing engineer, and multi-instrumentalist
- Kenneth Lewis (politician) (1916–1997), British politician
- Kenneth Lewis (general) (c.1929–1992), Canadian air force general
- Kenny Lewis (long jumper) (born 1974), Grenadian long jumper
- Kenny Lewis (American football) (born 1957), American football player
