= Athletics at the 1996 Summer Olympics – Men's long jump =

Men's long jump at the Games of the XXVI Olympiad
- Pictogram for athletics
- Venue: Centennial Olympic Stadium
- Date: 28 July 1996 (qualifying); 29 July 1996 (finals)
- Competitors: 52 from 40 nations
- Winning distance: 8.50

Medalists
1st place, gold medalist(s)		Carl Lewis; United States
2nd place, silver medalist(s)		James Beckford; Jamaica
3rd place, bronze medalist(s)		Joe Greene; United States

Official Video Highlights @ 1:50:32

The men's long jump was an athletics event at the 1996 Summer Olympics in Atlanta, Georgia, United States. There were 54 competitors from 41 nations, with one athlete not starting. The maximum number of athletes per nation had been set at 3 since the 1930 Olympic Congress. The event was won by 21cm by Carl Lewis of the United States, the nation's fourth consecutive and 20th overall gold medal in the men's long jump. Lewis himself had won the four straight victories, becoming the third Olympian to win the same event four times in a row (after Al Oerter and Paul Elvstrøm, counting the latter's wins in the Firefly and Finn sailing classes as the same event) as well as the only man to win four long jump medals. It was the ninth and final Olympic gold of Lewis's career. James Beckford earned Jamaica's first medal in the event. Joe Greene matched his bronze from 1992, becoming the ninth two-medal winner in the event.

== Summary ==
Carl Lewis was on the edge of equalling the accomplishment of Al Oerter by winning four Olympic championships in the same event. However, now 35 years old, he was comparatively quite old for a sprinter-long jumper. Lewis barely made it to the Olympics, only finishing third at the 1996 Olympic Trials behind world record holder 33-year-old Mike Powell and 29-year-old Joe Greene. These same three American jumpers had swept the event four years earlier.

While Lewis was ranked number one from the qualifying round, it took him three jumps to make the automatic qualifier. Lewis gained some notoriety by winning the 1984 Olympics on his single, first attempt. Powell, Greene and Iván Pedroso made their automatic qualifier (8.05 m) on their first attempt.

In the first round Emmanuel Bangué took the lead with 8.19 m. Powell moved into second place in the second round at 8.17 m, with Lewis jumping 8.10 m to move into third. Greene moved into the lead in the third round with an 8.24 m, until Lewis made his 8.50 jump. Lewis' jump equalled former rival Larry Myricks' still standing Masters M35 World Record.

While Pedroso was the reigning world champion and had jumped significantly better just a year earlier, he didn't get into the final eight to get three remaining jumps. No other jumper improved in his final jumps except James Beckford, whose final-round 8.29 m lifted him into the silver medal, pushing Greene to bronze.

== Background ==
This was the 23rd appearance of the event, which is one of 12 athletics events to have been held at every Summer Olympics. The top six finishers from the 1992 Games returned: the American medal-sweeping team of Carl Lewis, Mike Powell, and Joe Greene, fourth-place finisher Iván Pedroso and fifth-place finisher Jaime Jefferson of Cuba, and sixth-place finisher Konstantinos Koukodimos of Greece; other returning finalists were eighth-place finisher Geng Huang of China and twelfth-place finisher Bogdan Tudor of Romania. Pedroso had surpassed Powell as the world's best jumper in 1995, winning the world championship. Both men, however, struggled with hamstring injuries coming into the Games. Lewis, the three-time Olympic champion, barely qualified for the American team behind Powell and Greene.

Armenia, Belarus, the British Virgin Islands, Croatia, the Czech Republic, the Gambia, the Netherlands Antilles, Sri Lanka, Turkmenistan, and Ukraine each made their first appearance in the event. The United States appeared for the 22nd time, most of any nation, having missed only the boycotted 1980 Games.

== Competition format ==
The 1996 competition used the two-round format with divided final introduced in 1952. The qualifying round gave each competitor three jumps to achieve a distance of 8.05 metres; if fewer than 12 men did so, the top 12 (including all those tied) would advance. The final provided each jumper with three jumps; the top eight jumpers received an additional three jumps for a total of six, with the best to count (qualifying round jumps were not considered for the final).

== Records ==
The standing world and Olympic records prior to the event were as follows.

World record	Mike Powell (USA)	8.95	Tokyo, Japan	30 August 1991
Olympic record	Bob Beamon (USA)	8.90	Mexico City, Mexico	18 October 1968

No new world or Olympic records were set during the competition.

== Schedule ==
All times are Eastern Daylight Time (UTC-4)

Date	Time	Round
Sunday, 28 July 1996	17:15	Qualifying
Monday, 29 July 1996	19:10	Final

== Results ==
=== Qualifying ===
Rank	Athlete	Nation	1	2	3	Distance	Notes
1	Carl Lewis	United States	7.93	X	8.29	8.29	Q
2	Joe Greene	United States	8.28	—	—	8.28	Q
3	Yuriy Naumkin	Russia	7.83	8.21	—	8.21	Q
4	Mike Powell	United States	8.20	—	—	8.20	Q
5	Erik Nys	Belgium	7.80	X	8.16	8.16	Q
6	Huang Geng	China	7.70	8.12	—	8.12	Q
7	Emmanuel Bangué	France	7.88	X	8.09	8.09	Q
8	Aliaksandar Hlavatski	Belarus	7.90	8.07	—	8.07	Q
9	Iván Pedroso	Cuba	8.05	—	—	8.05	Q
10	James Beckford	Jamaica	X	8.02	X	8.02	q
10	Mattias Sunneborn	Sweden	8.02	—	—	8.02	q
12	Gregor Cankar	Slovenia	X	X	8.00	8.00	q
12	Andrey Ignatov	Russia	X	X	8.00	8.00	q
14	Spyridon Vasdekis	Greece	7.98	7.90	7.96	7.98	
15	Bogdan Ţărus	Romania	X	7.96	7.92	7.96	
16	Andrew Owusu	Ghana	7.91	7.88	X	7.91	
17	Nai Hui-Fang	Chinese Taipei	7.81	7.48	7.91	7.91	
18	Cheikh Tidiane Touré	Senegal	7.91	X	7.76	7.91	
19	Bogdan Tudor	Romania	7.88	7.72	7.87	7.88	
20	Milan Gombala	Czech Republic	7.88	X	X	7.88	
21	Georg Ackermann	Germany	X	X	7.86	7.86	
22	János Uzsoki	Hungary	X	X	7.82	7.82	
22	Kostas Koukodimos	Greece	7.82	X	X	7.82	
24	Carlos Calado	Portugal	7.36	7.81	X	7.81	
25	Simone Bianchi	Italy	X	X	7.79	7.79	
26	Vitaliy Kyrylenko	Ukraine	7.77	X	7.62	7.77	
27	Nelson Ferreira	Brazil	7.76	7.69	—	7.76	
28	Robert Emmiyan	Armenia	7.76	7.52	X	7.76	
29	Chen Jing	China	X	7.70	X	7.70	
30	Chao Chih-Kuo	Chinese Taipei	7.67	X	X	7.67	
31	Jaime Jefferson	Cuba	7.61	7.47	7.65	7.65	
32	Jesús Oliván	Spain	7.59	7.64	X	7.64	
33	Douglas de Souza	Brazil	7.59	X	7.61	7.61	
34	Richard Duncan	Canada	7.51	7.56	7.61	7.61	
35	Aleksey Petrukhanov	Russia	X	7.25	7.50	7.50	
36	Nobuharu Asahara	Japan	5.49	7.46	X	7.46	
37	Remmy Limo	Kenya	X	7.46	X	7.46	
38	François Fouché	South Africa	7.29	7.30	7.44	7.44	
39	Kenny Lewis	Grenada	7.41	7.22	X	7.41	
40	Keita Cline	British Virgin Islands	X	X	7.26	7.26	
41	Andreja Marinković	FR Yugoslavia	X	7.17	X	7.17	
42	Márcio da Cruz	Brazil	7.12	X	X	7.12	
43	Victor Shabangu	Swaziland	6.79	X	X	6.79	
—	Siniša Ergotić	Croatia	X	X	X	No mark	
—	Benny Fernando	Sri Lanka	X	X	X	No mark	
—	Hans-Peter Lott	Germany	X	X	X	No mark	
—	Vladimir Malyavin	Turkmenistan	X	X	X	No mark	
—	Ellsworth Manuel	Netherlands Antilles	X	X	X	No mark	
—	Ivaylo Mladenov	Bulgaria	X	X	X	No mark	
—	Ousman Sallah	The Gambia	X	X	X	No mark	
—	Sung Hee-Jun	South Korea	X	X	X	No mark	
—	Franck Zio	Burkina Faso	X	X	X	No mark	
—	Craig Hepburn	Bahamas	DNS				

=== Final ===
Rank	Athlete	Nation	1	2	3	4	5	6	Distance
1st place, gold medalist(s)	Carl Lewis	United States	X	8.14	8.50 SB =MWR	—	8.06	X	8.50
2nd place, silver medalist(s)	James Beckford	Jamaica	X	8.02	8.13	X	X	8.29	8.29
3rd place, bronze medalist(s)	Joe Greene	United States	7.80	7.79	8.24 SB	X	X	X	8.24
4	Emmanuel Bangué	France	8.19	8.10	X	7.88	6.46	6.87	8.19
5	Mike Powell	United States	7.89	8.17 SB	7.99	X	X	X	8.17
6	Gregor Cankar	Slovenia	X	X	8.11	X	X	5.33	8.11
7	Aliaksandar Hlavatski	Belarus	8.07	X	8.07	X	X	X	8.07
8	Mattias Sunneborn	Sweden	7.89	7.97	8.06	8.04	8.03	7.75	8.06
9	Huang Geng	China	7.99	7.87	7.89	Did not advance			7.99
10	Yuriy Naumkin	Russia	7.96	7.88	7.95	Did not advance			7.96
11	Andrey Ignatov	Russia	X	7.83	7.58	Did not advance			7.83
12	Iván Pedroso	Cuba	X	7.57	7.75	Did not advance			7.75
13	Erik Nys	Belgium	7.59	X	7.72	Did not advance			7.72

== See also ==
- 1994 Men's European Championships Long Jump (Helsinki)
- 1995 Men's World Championships Long Jump (Gothenburg)
- 1997 Men's World Championships Long Jump (Athens)
- 1998 Men's European Championships Long Jump (Budapest)
