= Brian McDonough (cyclist) =

American cyclist

Personal information
- Born: August 16, 1965 (age 61) Winston-Salem, North Carolina, U.S.

Cycling career
- Sport: Cycling

Brian McDonough (born August 16, 1965) is an American cyclist. He competed in the men's points race at the 1996 Summer Olympics.
