= Juan Merheb =

Puerto Rican cyclist

Personal information
- Born: 29 December 1970 (age 55)

Cycling career
- Sport: Cycling
Medal record
Representing Puerto Rico
Pan American Games
| Bronze medal – third place | 1995 Mar del Plata | Points race |
Central American and Caribbean Games
| Bronze medal – third place | 1990 Mexico City | Tandem |
| Bronze medal – third place | 1993 Ponce | Tandem |

Juan Carlos Merheb (born 29 December 1970) is a Puerto Rican cyclist. He competed in the men's points race at the 1996 Summer Olympics.
