= Hsieh Shu-ting =

Taiwanese swimmer

Personal information
- Full name: Hsieh Shu-ting
- National team: Chinese Taipei
- Born: 2 January 1981 (age 45) Taipei, Taiwan
- Height: 1.66 m (5 ft 5 in)
- Weight: 47 kg (104 lb)

Sport
- Sport: Swimming
- Strokes: Freestyle, butterfly

Hsieh Shu-ting
- Traditional Chinese: 謝淑婷
- Simplified Chinese: 谢淑婷
Transcriptions
Standard Mandarin
- Hanyu Pinyin: Xiè Shútíng (Note: "Shú" is the pronunciation of the character "淑" in the Republic of China area, including Taiwan. In Mainland China this character would be pronounced "shū")
- Wade–Giles: Hsieh4 Shu2-tʻing2

Hsieh Shu-ting (Chinese: 謝淑婷; born January 2, 1981) is a Taiwanese former swimmer, who specialized in freestyle and butterfly events. She represented Chinese Taipei in two editions of the Olympic Games (1996 and 2000), and later captured a bronze medal in the 4 × 200 m freestyle relay (8:18.92) at the 1998 Asian Games in Bangkok, Thailand.

Hsieh made her first Chinese Taipei team, as a 15-year-old teen, at the 1996 Summer Olympics in Atlanta. She failed to reach the top 16 final in the 100 m butterfly, finishing in thirty-seventh place at 1:04.39. A member of the Chinese Taipei squad, she placed nineteenth in the 4 × 200 m freestyle relay (8:27.61), and twenty-fourth in the 4 × 100 m medley relay (4:38.90).

At the 2000 Summer Olympics in Sydney, Hsieh drastically decided to swim only in the 100 m butterfly. She achieved a FINA B-cut of 1:03.25 from the National University Games in Taipei. Swimming in heat two, she was faster by more than half a second (0.50) to a top speed, from start to finish, in a sterling time of 1:03.52. Hsieh's effortless triumph was not enough to put her through to the semifinals, as she placed forty-first overall on the first day of prelims.
