= Chen Jing (athlete) =

Chinese athlete

Personal information
- Nationality: Chinese
- Born: 6 March 1976 (age 50)

Sport
- Sport: Athletics
- Event: Long jump

Chen Jing (born 6 March 1976) is a Chinese athlete. He competed in the men's long jump at the 1996 Summer Olympics.
