= Cycling at the 1996 Summer Olympics – Men's points race =

Cycling at the Olympics

Men's points race at the Games of the XXVI Olympiad
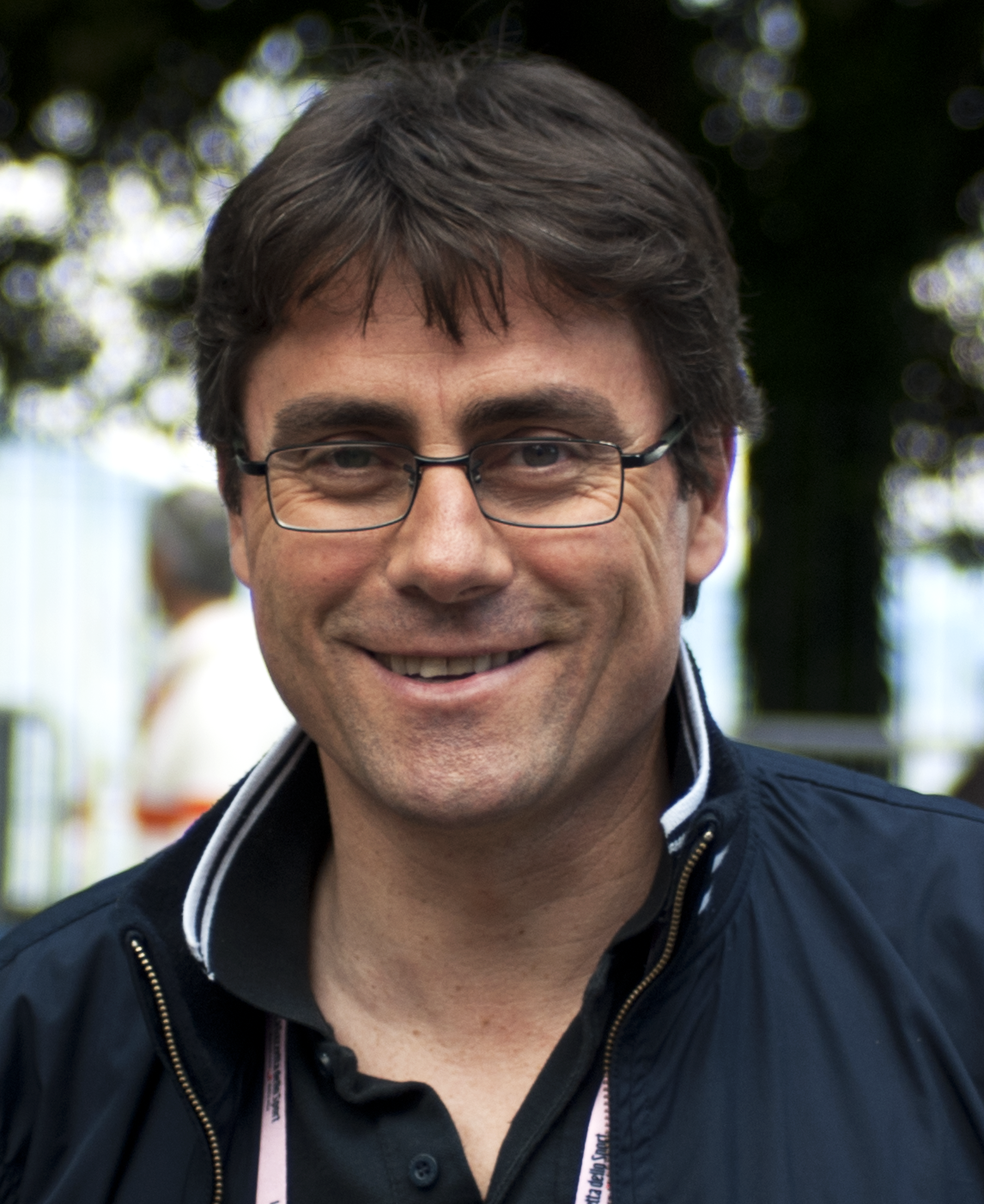
- Silvio Martinello (2014)
- Venue: Stone Mountain Velodrome
- Date: 28 July
- Competitors: 28 from 28 nations
- Winning score: 37 (0 laps behind)

Medalists
1st place, gold medalist(s)		Silvio Martinello; Italy
2nd place, silver medalist(s)		Brian Walton; Canada
3rd place, bronze medalist(s)		Stuart O'Grady; Australia

The men's points race was an event at the 1996 Summer Olympics in Atlanta, Georgia. There were 28 participants from 28 nations, with 24 cyclists completing the final, which was held on July 28, 1996. Each nation was limited to one cyclist in the event. The event was won by Silvio Martinello of Italy, the nation's second consecutive and third overall victory in the men's points race (no other nation had more than one win). Silver went to Brian Walton of Canada and bronze to Stuart O'Grady of Australia; it was the first medal in the event for both nations.

== Background ==
This was the fifth appearance of the event. It was first held in 1900 and not again until 1984; after that, it was held every Summer Games until 2008 when it was removed from the programme. The women's version was held from 1996 through 2008.

Four of the 24 finalists from the 1992 Games returned: fourth-place finisher Glenn McLeay of New Zealand, seventh-place finisher Guido Fulst of Germany, ninth-place finisher Franz Stocher of Austria, and non-finisher Vasyl Yakovlev of the Unified Team (now competing for Ukraine). Etienne De Wilde of Belgium was the 1993 World Champion; Silvio Martinello of Italy had won in 1994 and 1995.

Guatemala, Ireland, Kazakhstan, Kyrgyzstan, Lithuania, Puerto Rico, Russia, and Ukraine each made their debut in the event. France and Italy both competed for the fifth time, the only nations to have competed in all five Olympic men's points races.

== Competition format ==
The contest normally consisted of two rounds, semifinals and a final, but with only 28 cyclists competing in 1996 the first round was skipped and only a final was held. The distance was reduced from 50 kilometres in previous finals to 40 kilometres in this competition. Placement was determined first by how many laps behind the leader the cyclist was and second by how many sprint points the cyclist accumulated. That is, a cyclist with more sprint points but who was lapped once would be ranked behind a cyclist with fewer points but who had not been lapped. Sprint points could be gained only by cyclists who had not been lapped.

There were 20 sprints—one every 2 kilometres (8 laps). Points were awarded based on the position of the cyclists at the end of the sprint. Most of the sprints were worth 5 points for the leader, 3 to the second-place cyclist, 2 to third, and 1 to fourth. The final sprint was worth double: 10 points, 6, 4, and 2.

== Schedule ==
All times are Eastern Daylight Time (UTC-4)

Date	Time	Round
Sunday, 28 July 1996	11:15	Final

== Results ==
Rank	Cyclist	Nation	Laps behind	Points
1st place, gold medalist(s)	Silvio Martinello	Italy	0	37
2nd place, silver medalist(s)	Brian Walton	Canada	0	29
3rd place, bronze medalist(s)	Stuart O'Grady	Australia	0	25
4	Vasyl Yakovlev	Ukraine	0	24
5	Francis Moreau	France	0	21
6	Juan Llaneras	Spain	0	17
7	Cho Ho-Sung	South Korea	0	6
8	Glenn McLeay	New Zealand	1	14
9	Guido Fulst	Germany	1	8
10	Sergey Lavrenenko	Kazakhstan	1	7
11	Milton Wynants	Uruguay	1	6
12	Franz Stocher	Austria	1	5
13	Remigijus Lupeikis	Lithuania	1	4
14	Pavel Khamidulin	Russia	1	4
15	Masahiro Yasuhara	Japan	1	2
16	Yevgeny Vakker	Kyrgyzstan	1	1
17	Bruno Risi	Switzerland	2	8
18	Jan Bo Petersen	Denmark	2	7
19	Brian McDonough	United States	2	5
20	Sergio Godoy	Guatemala	2	0
21	Peter Pieters	Netherlands	2	0
22	Declan Lonergan	Ireland	2	0
23	Juan Curuchet	Argentina	2	0
24	Etienne De Wilde	Belgium	2	0
—	David George	South Africa	DNF	—
—	Juan Merheb	Puerto Rico	DNF	—
—	Marlon Pérez	Colombia	DNF	—
—	Marco Zaragoza	Mexico	DNF	—

== Sources ==
- Official Report
