= Ba Yanchuan =

Chinese wrestler

Personal information
- Nationality: Chinese
- Born: 10 May 1972 (age 54)

Sport
- Sport: Wrestling

Ba Yanchuan (born 10 May 1972) is a Chinese wrestler. He competed in the men's Greco-Roman 100 kg at the 1996 Summer Olympics.
