= Colbie Bell =

Canadian wrestler (born 1971)

Personal information
- Born: 3 November 1971 (age 54) Edmonton, Alberta, Canada

Sport
- Sport: Wrestling
Medal record
Representing Canada
Pan American Games
Bronze medal – third place	1999 Winnipeg	-97kg Greco-Roman

Colbie Bell (born 3 November 1971) is a Canadian wrestler. He competed in the men's Greco-Roman 100 kg at the 1996 Summer Olympics.
