= Mohamed Basri (wrestler) =

Moroccan wrestler

Personal information
- Nationality: Moroccan
- Born: 1 January 1971 (age 55)

Sport
- Sport: Wrestling

Mohamed Basri (born 1 January 1971) is a Moroccan wrestler. He competed in the men's Greco-Roman 100 kg at the 1996 Summer Olympics.
