= Yelena Makarova =

Russian swimmer

Personal information
- Born: 1 February 1973 (age 53) Moscow, Russia

Sport
- Sport: Swimming

Yelena Makarova (born 1 February 1973) is a Russian breaststroke swimmer. She competed in two events at the 1996 Summer Olympics.
