= Yevgeniya Nikonova =

Russian basketball player

Yevgeniya Viktorovna Nikonova (Russian: Евгения Викторовна Никонова; born 1 January 1970) is a Russian former basketball player who competed in the 1996 Summer Olympics and in the 2000 Summer Olympics.
