= Tatyana Litovchenko =

Russian swimmer

Personal information
- Born: 10 May 1978 (age 48)

Sport
- Sport: Swimming

Tatyana Litovchenko (born 10 May 1978) is a Russian freestyle swimmer. She competed in two events at the 1996 Summer Olympics.
