= Irina Rutkovskaya =

Russian basketball player

Irina Rutkovskaya (born 14 January 1969) is a Russian former basketball player who competed in the 1996 Summer Olympics and in the 2000 Summer Olympics.
