= Kenny Lewis (long jumper) =

Personal information
- Full name: Errol Kenny Lewis
- Nickname: Kenny
- Born: 26 February 1974 (age 52) St. George's, Grenada

Achievements and titles
- Personal best(s): Long Jump: 7.41m (1996); Triple Jump:15.73m (1996)

Kenny Lewis (born 26 February 1974) is a retired Grenadian long jumper. He competed at the 1996 Olympic Games without reaching the final round.
