= Bakur Gogitidze =

Georgian wrestler

Personal information
- Nationality: Georgian
- Born: 9 October 1973 (age 51); Tbilisi, Georgia

Sport
- Sport: Wrestling

Bakur Gogitidze (born 9 October 1973) is a Georgian wrestler. He competed in the men's Greco-Roman 100 kg at the 1996 Summer Olympics.
