= Teymuraz Edisherashvili =

Russian wrestler

Personal information
- Nationality: Russian
- Born: 26 September 1973 (age 52)

Sport
- Sport: Wrestling

Teymuraz Edisherashvili (born 26 September 1973) is a Russian wrestler. He competed in the men's Greco-Roman 100 kg at the 1996 Summer Olympics.
