= Juan Giraldo (footballer) =

Colombian footballer (born 1998)

Personal information
- Full name: Juan Fernando Giraldo Cárdenas
- Date of birth: 15 December 1998 (age 27)
- Place of birth: Valle del Cauca, Colombia
- Position: Midfielder

Team information
- Current team: Club Atlético Fénix

Youth career
- Deportivo Cali

Senior career*
Years	Team	Apps	(Gls)
2017–2018	Deportivo Cali	0	(0)
2019–2020	Atlante	0	(0)
2022	Jaguares de Córdoba	4	(0)
2023–	Club Atlético Fénix	0	(0)
- * Club domestic league appearances and goals as of 18:44, 14 September 2023 (UTC)

Juan Fernando Giraldo Cárdenas (born 15 December 1998) is a Colombian footballer who currently plays as a midfielder for Club Atlético Fénix.

== Club career ==
Born in the Valle del Cauca Department of Colombia, Giraldo began his career with Deportivo Cali, progressing through the academy before being promoted to the first team for the 2017 season. Having made three appearances in the Copa Colombia, the following year he was taken by a businessman to the United States, with the promise of a future in Major League Soccer. However, despite being given this promise, the trip was actually for a trial, and the unnamed club decided to pass on Giraldo, as they had filled their foreign player quota.

Instead, Giraldo moved to Mexico, joining Atlante ahead of the 2019 Clausura competition. However, in April 2020, following four appearances for Atlante in the Copa MX, Giraldo was one of thirteen Colombian footballers in Mexico who were released, as their clubs could not afford to keep them on.

He returned to Colombia for the 2022 season with Jaguares de Córdoba, and played in four Categoría Primera A matches before being released at the end of the season.

== Personal life ==
Giraldo is the brother of fellow professional footballer Daniel Giraldo.

== Career statistics ==
=== Club ===
As of 15 September 2023.

Appearances and goals by club, season and competition
Club	Season	League			Cup		Continental		Other		Total	
Club	Season	Division	Apps	Goals	Apps	Goals	Apps	Goals	Apps	Goals	Apps	Goals
Deportivo Cali	2017	Categoría Primera A	0	0	3 (Note: Appearances in the Copa Colombia)	0	0	0	0	0	3	0
Deportivo Cali	2018	Categoría Primera A	0	0	0	0	0	0	0	0	0	0
Deportivo Cali	Total		0	0	3	0	0	0	0	0	3	0
Atlante	2018–19	Ascenso MX	0	0	1 (Note: Appearances in the Copa MX)	0	–		0	0	1	0
Atlante	2019–20	Ascenso MX	0	0	3	0	–		0	0	3	0
Atlante	Total		0	0	4	0	0	0	0	0	4	0
Jaguares de Córdoba	2022	Categoría Primera A	4	0	4	0	–		0	0	8	0
Club Atlético Fénix	2023	Primera B Metropolitana	0	0	0	0	–		0	0	0	0
Career total			4	0	11	0	0	0	0	0	15	0
