= Takashi Nonomura =

Japanese wrestler (born 1969)

Personal information
- Nationality: Japanese
- Born: 20 March 1969 (age 56); Aichi, Japan

Sport
- Sport: Wrestling

Takashi Nonomura (born 20 March 1969) is a Japanese wrestler. He competed at the 1992 Summer Olympics and the 1996 Summer Olympics.
