= Svetlana Vanyo =

Russian swimmer

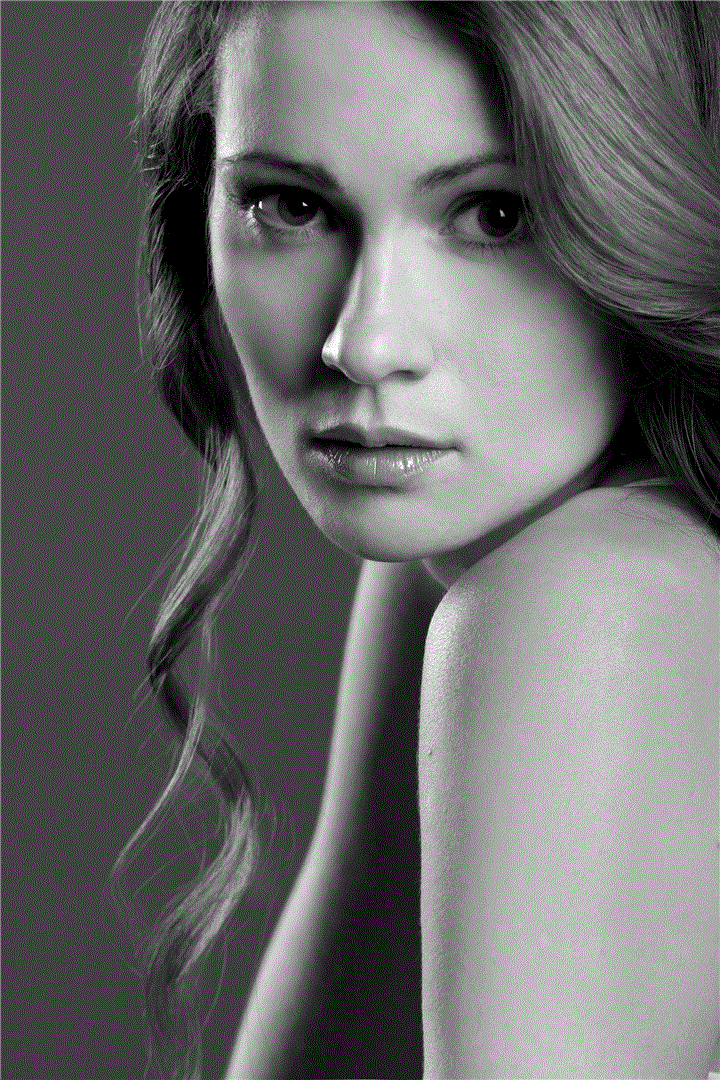
- Svetlana Vanyo

Personal information
- Full name: Svetlana Gennadievna Vanyo
- National team: Russia
- Born: May 26, 1977 (age 49) Kuybyshev, Russian SFSR, Soviet Union
- Height: 1.72 m (5 ft 8 in)

Sport
- Sport: Swimming
- Strokes: Butterfly
Medal record
Women's swimming
Representing Russia
World Championships
Bronze medal – third place	1994 Rome	4×100 m medley
European Championships
Silver medal – second place	1997 Seville	4×100 m medley

Svetlana Vanyo (born May 26, 1977), née Svetlana Pozdeyeva, is a Russian-American former competition swimmer, coach, and private swimming instructor. She is a world championship medalist, former Russian national record-holder, and 1996 Olympics finalist.

Pozdeyeva's swimming accomplishments earned her one of the highest awards in Russia for her contributions to the nation: the Russian Federation's Certificate to the State and Medal of the Order for Merits before the Fatherland "Second Degree," awarded to her personally in 1995 by President Boris Yeltsin. In total, Pozdeyeva won 20 gold, silver, and bronze medals at various international competitions throughout her swimming career.

== Career ==
Pozdeyeva was selected to join the Russian Junior National Swimming Team in 1988 at the age of 11. She swam the 100- and 200-meter butterfly and the medley relay, traveling with the team to many international swimming competitions. At a major competitive junior event, the 1992 European Junior Swimming Championships, held in Leeds, England, Pozdeyeva won a gold medal in the medley relay and a silver medal in the 100-meter butterfly.

At the age of 15, Pozdeyeva was selected to join the Russian National Swimming Team. During this time, she trained and competed with the National Team and also participated in junior swimming meets for which she was still eligible. She swam the same events on the National Team: the 100- and 200-meter butterfly and the medley relay. Highlights during this time: she won a silver medal at the 1993 European Sprint Swimming Championships in Gateshead, United Kingdom, 2 silver medals at the 1994 Goodwill Games in St. Petersburg, Russia, a bronze medal at the 1994 World Aquatics Championships in Rome, Italy, and a silver medal at the 1997 European Aquatics Championships in Seville, Spain.

Pozdeyeva qualified for the Russian Olympic Swimming Team in 1996. She swam in the 100-meter butterfly and the medley relay at the 1996 Olympics in Atlanta, Georgia. Her medley relay team made the finals, and she swam in the B Finals for the 100-meter butterfly.

Pozdeyeva retired from competitive swimming in 1997 to focus on her education. She graduated from the Pedagogical University of Samara in 2000 with a Bachelor of Arts and a Master of Arts in Physical Education.

Now known as Vanyo (married to Brian Vanyo), she obtained her U.S. citizenship on September 11, 2009 and resides in Charlottesville, Virginia. She was featured in Charlottesville Woman Magazine of the Charlottesville Daily Progress in May/June 2012.
