= Pavel Khamidulin =

Russian cyclist

Personal information
- Born: 2 October 1971 (age 55) Moscow, Russia

Cycling career
- Sport: Cycling

Pavel Khamidulin (born 2 October 1971) is a Russian cyclist. He competed in the men's points race at the 1996 Summer Olympics.
