= Nataliya Zolotukhina (swimmer) =

Ukrainian swimmer

Personal information
- Born: 24 November 1976 (age 49)

Sport
- Sport: Swimming
Medal record
Women's swimming
Representing Ukraine
Summer Universiade
Bronze medal – third place	1999 Mallorca	4 x 400 m metres

Nataliya Zolotukhina (born 24 November 1976) is a Ukrainian butterfly swimmer. She competed in two events at the 1996 Summer Olympics.
