= Todor Manov =

Bulgarian wrestler

Personal information
- Nationality: Bulgarian
- Born: 17 June 1969 (age 57) Samokov, Bulgaria

Sport
- Sport: Wrestling

Todor Manov (born 17 June 1969) is a Bulgarian wrestler. He competed in the men's Greco-Roman 100 kg at the 1996 Summer Olympics.
