= Aleksey Petrukhanov =

Russian long jumper

Personal information
- Nationality: Russian
- Born: 15 May 1972 (age 54)

Sport
- Sport: Athletics
- Event: Long jump

Aleksey Petrukhanov (born 15 May 1972) is a Russian athlete. He competed in the men's long jump at the 1996 Summer Olympics.
