= Jason Gleasman =

American wrestler (born 1975)

Personal information
- Born: March 27, 1975 (age 51) Wilmington, Delaware, U.S.
- Home town: Boonville, New York, U.S.

Sport
- Country: United States
- Sport: Wrestling
- Events: Greco-Roman and Folkstyle
- Club: New York Athletic Club
- Team: USA
Medal record
Men's Greco-Roman wrestling
Representing the United States
Espoir World Championships
Gold medal – first place	1993 Cali	130 kg
Cadet World Championships
Gold medal – first place	1991 Barcelona	95 kg

Jason Gleasman (born March 27, 1975) is an American former Greco-Roman wrestler. He competed in the men's Greco-Roman 100 kg at the 1996 Summer Olympics. Prior to his Senior level career, he was a two-time World Champion at the Espoir and Cadet World Championships. In college, Gleasman was a two-time NCAA All-American at Syracuse University.
