= Igor Grabovetchi =

Moldovan wrestler

Personal information
- Nationality: Moldovian
- Born: 24 July 1967 (age 58)

Sport
- Sport: Wrestling

Igor Grabovetchi (born 24 July 1967) is a Moldovan wrestler. He placed sixth in Greco-Roman wrestling, heavyweight class, at the 1996 Summer Olympics in Atlanta. He has represented Moldova numerous times at the World and European championships.
