= Yuriy Naumkin =

Russian long jumper

Yuriy Naumkin (Russian: Юрий Наумкин; born 5 November 1968) is a retired Russian long jumper.

He finished eighth at the 1996 European Indoor Championships and tenth at the 1996 Olympic Games. At the Atlanta games he jumped a personal long jump best of 8.21m
