= Yelena Nazemnova =

Russian swimmer

Personal information
- Born: 11 June 1980 (age 46) Penza, Russia

Sport
- Sport: Swimming

Yelena Nazemnova (born 11 June 1980) is a Russian freestyle and butterfly swimmer. She competed in four events at the 1996 Summer Olympics.
