= Emilio Suárez =

Venezuelan wrestler (born 1968)

Personal information
- Nationality: Venezuelan
- Born: 16 October 1968 (age 57) Tucupita, Venezuela

Sport
- Sport: Wrestling
Medal record
Representing Venezuela
Pan American Games
Silver medal – second place	1983 Caracas	Freestyle -82kg
Bronze medal – third place	1995 Mar del Plata	Greco-Roman -100kg
Central American and Caribbean Games
Silver medal – second place	1993 Ponce	Freestyle -100kg
Silver medal – second place	1993 Ponce	Greco-Roman -100kg
Bronze medal – third place	1998 Maracaibo	Greco-Roman -97kg

Emilio Leocadio Suárez Agreda (born 16 October 1968) is a Venezuelan wrestler. He competed in the men's Greco-Roman 100 kg at the 1996 Summer Olympics.
