= Juan Giraldo (wrestler) =

Colombian wrestler (born 1974)

Personal information
- Nationality: Colombian
- Born: 25 August 1974 (age 51)

Sport
- Sport: Wrestling

Juan Giraldo (born 25 August 1974) is a Colombian wrestler. He competed in the men's Greco-Roman 100 kg at the 1996 Summer Olympics. Juan Diego Giraldo had the following finishes at major championships – 1991 Pan-American Games: 90.0 kg. Greco-Roman (4th); 1991 Pan-American Games: 90.0 kg. Freestyle (5th); 1990 Central American Championship: 90.0 kg. Greco-Roman (2nd).
