= Stipe Damjanović =

Croatian wrestler

Personal information
- Nationality: Croatian
- Born: 14 September 1969 (age 55); Livno, Yugoslavia

Sport
- Sport: Wrestling

Stipe Damjanović (born 14 September 1969) is a Croatian wrestler. He competed at the 1992 Summer Olympics and the 1996 Summer Olympics.
