= Chile at the 2004 Summer Olympics =

- IOC code: CHI
- NOC: Chilean Olympic Committee
- Website: www.coch.cl (in Spanish)

in Athens
- Competitors: 22 in 11 sports
- Flag bearer: Kristel Köbrich
- Medals Ranked 39th: Gold 2 Silver 0 Bronze 1 Total 3

Summer Olympics appearances (overview)
- 1896; 1900–1908; 1912; 1920; 1924; 1928; 1932; 1936; 1948; 1952; 1956; 1960; 1964; 1968; 1972; 1976; 1980; 1984; 1988; 1992; 1996; 2000; 2004; 2008; 2012; 2016; 2020; 2024

Chile competed at the 2004 Summer Olympics in Athens, Greece, from 13 to 29 August 2004.

Chilean Olympic Committee (Spanish: Comité Olímpico de Chile, COCH) sent a total of 22 athletes to the Games, 16 men and 6 women, to compete in 11 sports; the nation's team size was roughly smaller from Sydney by almost half of the athletes, due to the absence of the men's football team. Six Chilean athletes had previously competed in Sydney, including tennis star and top medal favorite Nicolás Massú. Long-distance freestyle swimmer and Pan American Games bronze medalist Kristel Köbrich set a historic milestone as the nation's first ever female flag bearer in the opening ceremony, wearing and parading with a traditional Chilean costume.

Chile left Athens with a remarkable historic milestone from tennis players Nicolás Massú and Fernando González, as they picked up the grand slam Olympic title for the Chilean team in the men's doubles tournament. While Gonzalez collected a bronze in his match against U.S. tennis player Taylor Dent, Massu summoned his strength to defeat Dent's teammate Mardy Fish with a striking effort to complete the Chilean party on the Olympic tennis court, and most significantly, to snatch his second gold medal in the men's singles.

== Medalists ==
Medal	Name	Sport	Event	Date
Gold	Nicolás Massú	Tennis	Men's singles	August 22
Gold	Fernando González; Nicolás Massú	Tennis	Men's doubles	August 21
Bronze	Fernando González	Tennis	Men's singles	August 21

== Athletics ==
Chilean athletes have so far achieved qualifying standards in the following athletics events (up to a maximum of 3 athletes in each event at the 'A' Standard, and 1 at the 'B' Standard).

Key

- Note–Ranks given for track events are within the athlete's heat only
- Q = Qualified for the next round
- q = Qualified for the next round as a fastest loser or, in field events, by position without achieving the qualifying target
- NR = National record
- N/A = Round not applicable for the event
- Bye = Athlete not required to compete in round

Men
Field events

Athlete	Event	Qualification		Final	
Athlete	Event	Distance	Position	Distance	Position
Marco Antonio Verni	Shot put	NM	—	Did not advance	

Women
Track & road events

Athlete	Event	Final	
Athlete	Event	Result	Rank
Érika Olivera	Marathon	2:57:14	58

Field events

Athlete	Event	Qualification		Final	
Athlete	Event	Distance	Position	Distance	Position
Carolina Torres	Pole vault	4.00	33	Did not advance	

== Canoeing ==
=== Sprint ===
Athlete	Event	Heats		Semifinals		Final	
Athlete	Event	Time	Rank	Time	Rank	Time	Rank
Jonnathan Tafra	Men's C-1 1000 m	4:04.402	5 q	4:22.644	8	Did not advance	

Qualification Legend: Q = Qualify to final; q = Qualify to semifinal

== Cycling ==
=== Road ===
Athlete	Event	Time	Rank
Marcelo Arriagada	Men's road race	Did not finish	

=== Track ===
Omnium

Athlete	Event	Points	Laps	Rank
Marco Arriagada	Men's points race	25	1	11

=== Mountain biking ===
Athlete	Event	Time	Rank
Cristóbal Silva	Men's cross-country	LAP (1 lap)	40

== Fencing ==
Chile has qualified a single fencer.

Men

Athlete	Event	Round of 64	Round of 32	Round of 16	Quarterfinal	Semifinal	Final / BM	
Athlete	Event	Opposition Score	Opposition Score	Opposition Score	Opposition Score	Opposition Score	Opposition Score	Rank
Paris Inostroza	Individual épée	Bye	Thompson (USA); L 12–13	Did not advance				

== Judo ==
Chile has qualified a single judoka.

Athlete	Event	Round of 32	Round of 16	Quarterfinals	Semifinals	Repechage 1	Repechage 2	Repechage 3	Final / BM	
Athlete	Event	Opposition Result	Opposition Result	Opposition Result	Opposition Result	Opposition Result	Opposition Result	Opposition Result	Opposition Result	Rank
Gabriel Lama	Men's −90 kg	Olson (USA); L 0001–0120	Did not advance							

== Rowing ==
Chilean rowers qualified the following boats:

Men

Athlete	Event	Heats		Repechage		Semifinals		Final	
Athlete	Event	Time	Rank	Time	Rank	Time	Rank	Time	Rank
Óscar Vásquez	Single sculls	7:38.04	5 R	7:06.51	3 SD/E	7:27.11	2 FD	7:10.75	23

Women

Athlete	Event	Heats		Repechage		Semifinals		Final	
Athlete	Event	Time	Rank	Time	Rank	Time	Rank	Time	Rank
Soraya Jadué	Single sculls	7:58.28	3 R	7:37.60	2 SA/B	8:16.21	6 FB	7:42.76	11

Qualification Legend: FA=Final A (medal); FB=Final B (non-medal); FC=Final C (non-medal); FD=Final D (non-medal); FE=Final E (non-medal); FF=Final F (non-medal); SA/B=Semifinals A/B; SC/D=Semifinals C/D; SE/F=Semifinals E/F; R=Repechage

== Sailing ==
Chilean sailors have qualified one boat for each of the following events.

Open

Athlete	Event	Race											Net points	Final rank
Athlete	Event	1	2	3	4	5	6	7	8	9	10	M*	Net points	Final rank
Matías del Solar	Laser	~~39~~	38	6	38	16	15	18	11	27	31	16	216	23

M = Medal race; OCS = On course side of the starting line; DSQ = Disqualified; DNF = Did not finish; DNS= Did not start; RDG = Redress given

== Shooting ==
Chile has qualified a single shooter.

Men

Athlete	Event	Qualification		Final	
Athlete	Event	Points	Rank	Points	Rank
Jorge Atalah	Skeet	117	=31	Did not advance	

== Swimming ==
Chilean swimmers earned qualifying standards in the following events (up to a maximum of 2 swimmers in each event at the A-standard time, and 1 at the B-standard time):

Men

Athlete	Event	Heat		Semifinal		Final	
Athlete	Event	Time	Rank	Time	Rank	Time	Rank
Max Schnettler	100 m freestyle	51.91	49	Did not advance			
Giancarlo Zolezzi	200 m freestyle	1:53.18	39	Did not advance			
Giancarlo Zolezzi	400 m freestyle	3:56.52	25	—		Did not advance	
Giancarlo Zolezzi	1500 m freestyle	16:00.52	30	—		Did not advance	

Women

Athlete	Event	Heat		Final	
Athlete	Event	Result	Rank	Result	Rank
Kristel Köbrich	400 m freestyle	4:18.68	26	Did not advance	
Kristel Köbrich	800 m freestyle	8:40.41	15	Did not advance	

== Table tennis ==
Four Chilean table tennis players qualified for the following events.

Athlete	Event	Round 1	Round 2	Round 3	Round 4	Quarterfinals	Semifinals	Final / BM	
Athlete	Event	Opposition Result	Opposition Result	Opposition Result	Opposition Result	Opposition Result	Opposition Result	Opposition Result	Rank
Juan Papic	Men's singles	Lupulesku (USA); L 0–4	Did not advance						
Juan Papic; Alejandro Rodríguez	Men's doubles	—	Akinlabi / Nosiru (NGR); L 1–4	Did not advance					
Berta Rodríguez	Women's singles	Oshonaike (NGR); L 0–4	Did not advance						
Berta Rodríguez; Maria Paulina Vega	Women's doubles	Perez / Ramos (VEN); L 3–4	Did not advance						

== Tennis ==
Chile nominated two male tennis players to compete in the tournament.

Athlete	Event	Round of 64	Round of 32	Round of 16	Quarterfinals	Semifinals	Final / BM	
Athlete	Event	Opposition Score	Opposition Score	Opposition Score	Opposition Score	Opposition Score	Opposition Score	Rank
Fernando González	Men's singles	Economidis (GRE); W 7–6^{(8–6)}, 6–2	Lee H-T (KOR); W 7–5, 6–2	Roddick (USA); W 6–4, 6–4	Grosjean (FRA); W 6–2, 2–6, 6–4	Fish (USA); L 6–3, 3–6, 4–6	Dent (USA); W 6–4, 2–6, 16–14	3rd place, bronze medalist(s)
Nicolas Massú	Men's singles	Kuerten (BRA); W 6–3, 5–7, 6–4	Spadea (USA); W 7–6^{(7–3)}, 6–2	Andreev (RUS); W 6–3, 6–7^{(4–7)}, 6–4	Moyà (ESP); W 6–2, 7–5	Dent (USA); W 7–6^{(7–5)}, 6–1	Fish (USA); W 6–3, 3–6, 2–6, 6–3, 6–4	1st place, gold medalist(s)
Fernando González; Nicolas Massú	Men's doubles	—	Knowles / Merklein (BAH); W 7–5, 6–4	Etlis / Rodríguez (ARG); W 6–3, 7–6^{(7–2)}	B Bryan / M Bryan (USA); W 7–5, 6–4	Ančić / Ljubičić (CRO); W 7–5, 4–6, 6–4	Kiefer / Schüttler (GER); W 6–2, 4–6, 3–6, 7–6^{(9–7)}, 6–4	1st place, gold medalist(s)

== See also ==
- Chile at the 2003 Pan American Games
- Chile at the 2004 Summer Paralympics
