= 2000 Dubai Tennis Championships =

- Date: 7 – 13 February
- Edition: 8th
- Category: International Series
- Draw: 32S / 16D
- Prize money: $975,000
- Location: Dubai, United Arab Emirates
- Venue: Aviation Club Tennis Centre

Champions

Singles
- (Germany) Nicolas Kiefer

Doubles
- (Czech Republic) Jiří Novák / (Czech Republic) David Rikl
- Dubai Tennis Championships

The 2000 Dubai Tennis Championships, also known by its sponsored name Duty Free Dubai Open, was a men's tennis tournaments played on outdoor hard courts at the Aviation Club Tennis Centre in Dubai in the United Arab Emirates that were part of the International Series of the 2000 ATP Tour. The tournament was held from February 7 through February 13, 2000. First-seeded Nicolas Kiefer won the singles title.

== Finals ==
=== Singles ===
(Germany) Nicolas Kiefer defeated (Spain) Juan Carlos Ferrero 7–5, 4–6, 6–3

- It was Kiefer's 1st title of the year and the 5th of his career.

=== Doubles ===
(Czech Republic) Jiří Novák / (Czech Republic) David Rikl defeated (South Africa) Robbie Koenig / (Australia) Peter Tramacchi 6–2, 7–5

- It was Novák's 1st title of the year and the 10th of his career. It was Rikl's 1st title of the year and the 16th of his career.
