= 1999 Dubai Tennis Championships – Doubles =

Doubles
- 1999 Dubai Tennis Championships

Final
- Champions: (Zimbabwe) Wayne Black (Australia) Sandon Stolle
- Runners-up: (South Africa) David Adams (South Africa) John-Laffnie de Jager
- Score: 4–6, 6–1, 6–4

Details
- Draw: 16
- Seeds: 4

Events
Singles	Doubles
← 1998 ·	Dubai Tennis Championships	· 2000 →

The 1999 Dubai Tennis Championships was a tennis tournaments played on outdoor hard courts at the Aviation Club Tennis Centre in Dubai in the United Arab Emirates that were part of the World Series of the 1999 ATP Tour. The tournament was held from February 8 through February 14, 1999.

== Seeds ==
Champion seeds are indicated in bold text while text in italics indicates the round in which those seeds were eliminated.

1. (India) Mahesh Bhupathi / (India) Leander Paes (quarterfinals)
2. (France) Olivier Delaître / (France) Fabrice Santoro (first round)
3. (United States) Donald Johnson / (United States) Francisco Montana (first round)
4. (South Africa) Piet Norval / (South Africa) Kevin Ullyett (quarterfinals)

== Draw ==
=== Key ===
- Q = Qualifier
- WC = Wild card
- LL = Lucky loser
- Alt = Alternate
- ITF = ITF entry
- PR = Protected ranking
- SR = Special ranking
- SE = Special exempt
- JE = Junior exempt
- JR = Junior Accelerator Programme entrant
- CO = College Accelerator Programme entrant
- NG = Next Gen Accelerator Program entrant
- w/o = Walkover
- r = Retired
- d = Defaulted

=== Finals ===
First round
1	(India) **M Bhupathi** **(India) L Paes**	**7**	**7**
(Argentina) P Albano (Argentina) D Orsanic	6	6
(Australia) **J Eagle** **(Australia) A Florent**	4	**7**	**6**
(Czech Republic) C Suk (Australia) M Tebbutt	**6**	6	2
4	(South Africa) **P Norval** **(South Africa) K Ullyett**	**6**	4	**6**
(Australia) W Arthurs (United Kingdom) N Broad	4	**6**	3
(Zimbabwe) **W Black** **(Australia) S Stolle**	**6**	2	**6**
(Spain) T Carbonell (South Africa) C Haggard	4	**6**	3
(Sweden) **N Kulti** **(Australia) D Macpherson**	**6**	**6**
(Spain) À Corretja (Netherlands) S Groen	3	3
(Zimbabwe) **B Black** **(South Africa) W Ferreira**	**6**	**6**
3	(United States) D Johnson (United States) F Montana	2	3
(South Africa) **D Adams** **(South Africa) J-L de Jager**	4	**6**	**6**
(Sweden) J Björkman (Germany) N Kiefer	**6**	3	3
(Spain) **F Roig** **(Spain) J Sánchez**	5	**6**	**6**
2	(France) O Delaître (France) F Santoro	**7**	4	3

Quarterfinals
1	(India) M Bhupathi (India) L Paes	3	4
(Australia) **J Eagle** **(Australia) A Florent**	**6**	**6**
4	(South Africa) P Norval (South Africa) K Ullyett	2	2
(Zimbabwe) **W Black** **(Australia) S Stolle**	**6**	**6**
(Sweden) N Kulti (Australia) D Macpherson	2	**7**	5
(Zimbabwe) **B Black** **(South Africa) W Ferreira**	**6**	6	**7**
(South Africa) **D Adams** **(South Africa) J-L de Jager**	**6**	**6**
(Spain) F Roig (Spain) J Sánchez	2	3

Semifinals
(Australia) J Eagle (Australia) A Florent	4	**6**	3
(Zimbabwe) **W Black** **(Australia) S Stolle**	**6**	3	**6**
(Zimbabwe) B Black (South Africa) W Ferreira	6	**7**	2
(South Africa) **D Adams** **(South Africa) J-L de Jager**	**7**	5	**6**

Final
(Zimbabwe) **W Black** **(Australia) S Stolle**	4	**6**	**6**
(South Africa) D Adams (South Africa) J-L de Jager	**6**	1	4
