= 2000 Dubai Tennis Championships – Doubles =

Doubles
- 2000 Dubai Tennis Championships

Final
- Champions: (Czech Republic) Jiří Novák (Czech Republic) David Rikl
- Runners-up: (South Africa) Robbie Koenig (Australia) Peter Tramacchi
- Score: 6–2, 7–5

Details
- Draw: 16
- Seeds: 4

Events
| Singles | Doubles |
| ← 1999 · | Dubai Tennis Championships | · 2001 → |

Wayne Black and Sandon Stolle were the defending champions, but none competed this year. Black focused on the singles tournament.

Jiří Novák and David Rikl won the title by defeating Robbie Koenig and Peter Tramacchi 6–2, 7–5 in the final.

== Seeds ==
1. (Zimbabwe) Byron Black / (United States) Jeff Tarango (semifinals)
2. (South Africa) David Adams / (South Africa) John-Laffnie de Jager (semifinals)
3. (Czech Republic) Jiří Novák / (Czech Republic) David Rikl (champions)
4. (Czech Republic) Martin Damm / (Australia) Andrew Kratzmann (first round)

== Draw ==
=== Key ===
- Q = Qualifier
- WC = Wild card
- LL = Lucky loser
- Alt = Alternate
- SE = Special exempt
- PR = Protected ranking
- ITF = ITF entry
- JE = Junior exempt
- w/o = Walkover
- r = Retired
- d = Defaulted
- SR = Special ranking

=== Draw ===
First round
1 | (Zimbabwe) B Black (United States) J Tarango | 6 | 3 | 6
(North Macedonia) A Kitinov (Czech Republic) D Vacek | 3 | 6 | 2
(Australia) J Eagle (Australia) A Florent | 6 | 6
WC | (Spain) F Mantilla (Spain) A Martín | 3 | 3
3 | (Czech Republic) J Novák (Czech Republic) D Rikl | 6 | 3 | 6
(Ecuador) N Lapentti (India) L Paes | 3 | 6 | 3
(Romania) A Pavel (Belgium) T Vanhoudt | 1 | 3
(United States) D Johnson (South Africa) P Norval | 6 | 6
(Spain) A Berasategui (Spain) F Roig | 6 | 5 | 4
Q | (Spain) E Benfele Álvarez (Netherlands) S Groen | 3 | 7 | 6
(South Africa) R Koenig (Australia) P Tramacchi | 6 | 7^{7}
4 | (Czech Republic) M Damm (Australia) A Kratzmann | 2 | 6^{4}
WC | (Morocco) K Alami (Morocco) H Arazi | 6 | 4 | 6
WC | (Germany) N Kiefer (Sweden) M Norman | 2 | 6 | 2
(Czech Republic) P Pála (Czech Republic) P Vízner | 5 | 6^{4}
2 | (South Africa) D Adams (South Africa) J-L de Jager | 7 | 7^{7}

Quarterfinals
1 | (Zimbabwe) B Black (United States) J Tarango | 6 | 6
(Australia) J Eagle (Australia) A Florent | 4 | 2
3 | (Czech Republic) J Novák (Czech Republic) D Rikl | 6 | 6
(United States) D Johnson (South Africa) P Norval | 4 | 4
Q | (Spain) E Benfele Álvarez (Netherlands) S Groen | 2 | 5
(South Africa) R Koenig (Australia) P Tramacchi | 6 | 7
WC | (Morocco) K Alami (Morocco) H Arazi | 3 | 4
2 | (South Africa) D Adams (South Africa) J-L de Jager | 6 | 6

Semifinals
1 | (Zimbabwe) B Black (United States) J Tarango | 6 | 4 | 6^{6}
3 | (Czech Republic) J Novák (Czech Republic) D Rikl | 1 | 6 | 7^{8}
(South Africa) R Koenig (Australia) P Tramacchi | 4 | 6 | 7^{7}
2 | (South Africa) D Adams (South Africa) J-L de Jager | 6 | 3 | 6^{4}

Final
3 | (Czech Republic) J Novák (Czech Republic) D Rikl | 6 | 7
(South Africa) R Koenig (Australia) P Tramacchi | 2 | 5
