= 1999 Dubai Tennis Championships =

- Date: 8–14 February
- Edition: 7th
- Category: World Series
- Draw: 32S / 16D
- Prize money: $1,014,250
- Surface: Hard / outdoor
- Location: Dubai, United Arab Emirates
- Venue: Aviation Club Tennis Centre

Champions

Singles
- (France) Jérôme Golmard

Doubles
- (Zimbabwe) Wayne Black / (Australia) Sandon Stolle
- Dubai Tennis Championships

The 1999 Dubai Tennis Championships was a men's tennis tournaments played on outdoor hard courts at the Aviation Club Tennis Centre in Dubai in the United Arab Emirates that were part of the World Series of the 1999 ATP Tour. The tournament was held from 8 February through 14 February 1999. Unseeded Jérôme Golmard won the singles title.

== Finals ==
=== Singles ===
(France) Jérôme Golmard defeated (Germany) Nicolas Kiefer 6–4, 6–2

- It was Golmard's 1st singles title of his career.

=== Doubles ===
(Zimbabwe) Wayne Black / (Australia) Sandon Stolle defeated (South Africa) David Adams / (South Africa) John-Laffnie de Jager 4–6, 6–1, 6–4

- It was Black's 1st title of the year and the 1st of his career. It was Stolle's 1st title of the year and the 10th of his career.
