= 2000 Dubai Tennis Championships – Singles =

Singles
- 2000 Dubai Tennis Championships

Final
- Champion: (Germany) Nicolas Kiefer
- Runner-up: (Spain) Juan Carlos Ferrero
- Score: 7–5, 4–6, 6–3

Details
- Draw: 32
- Seeds: 8

Events
Singles	Doubles
← 1999 ·	Dubai Tennis Championships	· 2001 →

Jérôme Golmard was the defending champion, but lost in the quarterfinals to Nicolas Kiefer.

Kiefer went on to win the title, defeating Juan Carlos Ferrero 7–5, 4–6, 6–3 in the final.

== Seeds ==
1. (Germany) Nicolas Kiefer (champion)
2. (Sweden) Magnus Norman (first round)
3. (Ecuador) Nicolás Lapentti (second round)
4. (Spain) Albert Costa (semifinals)
5. (Morocco) Younes El Aynaoui (quarterfinals)
6. (Spain) Félix Mantilla (quarterfinals)
7. (Morocco) Hicham Arazi (second round)
8. (France) Jérôme Golmard (quarterfinals)

== Draw ==
=== Key ===
- Q = Qualifier
- WC = Wild card
- LL = Lucky loser
- Alt = Alternate
- SE = Special exempt
- PR = Protected ranking
- ITF = ITF entry
- JE = Junior exempt
- w/o = Walkover
- r = Retired
- d = Defaulted
- SR = Special ranking

=== Finals ===
Semifinals
1	(Germany) Nicolas Kiefer	6	6
4	(Spain) Albert Costa	2	0
(Spain) Juan Carlos Ferrero	7^{7}	6
(Morocco) Karim Alami	6^{3}	3

Final
1	(Germany) Nicolas Kiefer	7	4	6
(Spain) Juan Carlos Ferrero	5	6	3

=== Top half ===
First round
1	(Germany) N Kiefer	6	2	6
Q	(Germany) L Burgsmüller	1	6	4
(Spain) A Martín	6^{3}	6	6
(United States) J Tarango	7^{7}	2	2
(Germany) D Prinosil	2	2
(Romania) A Pavel	6	6
(Spain) F Clavet	4	6	1
8	(France) J Golmard	6	4	6
4	(Spain) A Costa	6	7
(Spain) A Berasategui	4	5
(Costa Rica) JA Marín	3	2
(Austria) S Koubek	6	6
WC	(Spain) G Blanco	6	6
(Netherlands) S Schalken	3	3
(Australia) A Ilie	3	3
5	(Morocco) Y El Aynaoui	6	6

Second round
1	(Germany) N Kiefer	6	5	6
(Spain) A Martín	3	7	0
(Romania) A Pavel	6	4	6^{3}
8	(France) J Golmard	3	6	7^{7}
4	(Spain) A Costa	6	6
(Austria) S Koubek	0	1
WC	(Spain) G Blanco	4	2
5	(Morocco) Y El Aynaoui	6	6

Quarterfinals
1	(Germany) N Kiefer	6	7^{7}
8	(France) J Golmard	3	6^{2}
4	(Spain) A Costa	6	6
5	(Morocco) Y El Aynaoui	2	4

Semifinals
1	(Germany) N Kiefer	6	6
4	(Spain) A Costa	2	0

=== Bottom half ===
First round
6	(Spain) F Mantilla	7^{8}	6
(Zimbabwe) B Black	6^{6}	2
(Czech Republic) D Vacek	2	3
WC	(Zimbabwe) W Black	6	6
Q	(Czech Republic) M Damm	3	6^{1}
(Spain) JC Ferrero	6	7^{7}
Q	(Germany) O Gross	3	2
3	(Ecuador) N Lapentti	6	6
7	(Morocco) H Arazi	6	6
(Germany) R Schüttler	2	3
Q	(Spain) E Benfele Álvarez	3	6	1
(Czech Republic) J Novák	6	1	6
WC	(India) L Paes	0	6	3
(Spain) F Vicente	6	4	6
(Morocco) K Alami	7^{8}	7
2	(Sweden) M Norman	6^{6}	5

Second round
6	(Spain) F Mantilla	6	6
WC	(Zimbabwe) W Black	1	3
(Spain) JC Ferrero	6	6
3	(Ecuador) N Lapentti	4	3
7	(Morocco) H Arazi	4	6	0
(Czech Republic) J Novák	6	1	6
(Spain) F Vicente	4	6	1
(Morocco) K Alami	6	3	6

Quarterfinals
6	(Spain) F Mantilla	3	6	6^{7}
(Spain) JC Ferrero	6	4	7^{9}
(Czech Republic) J Novák	4	2
(Morocco) K Alami	6	6

Semifinals
(Spain) JC Ferrero	7^{7}	6
(Morocco) K Alami	6^{3}	3
