= Tennis at the 2004 Summer Olympics =

Coordinates: 38°2′24″N 23°47′26″E

- Date: 15–22 August 2004
- Edition: 14
- Surface: Hard (DecoTurf)
- Location: Athens Olympic Tennis Centre, Athens

Champions

Men's singles
- Nicolás Massú; Chile

Women's singles
- Justine Henin; Belgium

Men's doubles
- Fernando González / Nicolás Massú; Chile

Women's doubles
- Li Ting / Sun Tiantian; China
← 2000 ·	Summer Olympics	· 2008 →

Tennis at the 2004 Summer Olympics in Athens took place on ten separate courts at the Olympic Tennis Centre. The surface was hardcourt.

172 players competed in four events. 2004 saw more of the top ranked players appearing, as this tournament saw world ranking points allocated to the players for the first time. Martina Navratilova made her first appearance at the Olympic Games where she partnered with Lisa Raymond in the ladies doubles.

Chile finished on top of the medal table with its first two Olympic gold medals in history, as Nicolás Massú won both the men's singles and doubles with Fernando González. They saved 4 consecutive championship points en route to the title in the 4th set tiebreak of the final. González also won a bronze medal in the men's singles competition. In the women's events, Justine Henin from Belgium secured the women's singles title while Chinese pair, Li Ting and Sun Tiantian took the women's doubles.

== Medal summary ==
=== Events ===
Event	Gold	Silver	Bronze
Men's singles	Nicolás Massú; Chile	Mardy Fish; United States	Fernando González; Chile
Men's doubles	Chile; Fernando González; Nicolás Massú	Germany; Nicolas Kiefer; Rainer Schüttler	Croatia; Mario Ančić; Ivan Ljubičić
Women's singles	Justine Henin; Belgium	Amélie Mauresmo; France	Alicia Molik; Australia
Women's doubles	China; Li Ting; Sun Tiantian	Spain; Conchita Martínez; Virginia Ruano Pascual	Argentina; Paola Suárez; Patricia Tarabini

=== Medal table ===
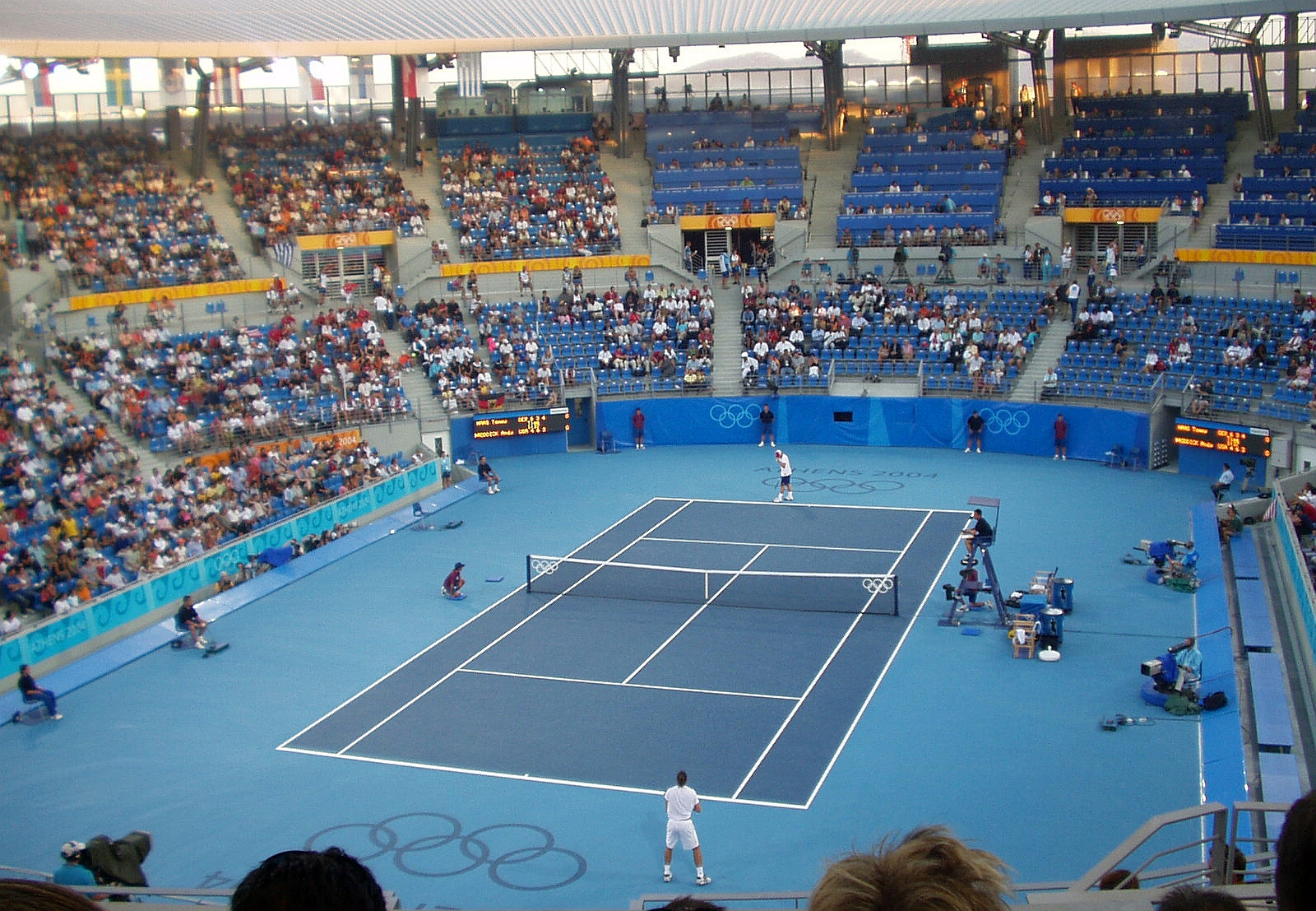
Andy Roddick vs. Tommy Haas. 4–6, 6–3, 9–7 in 2nd round

Rank	Nation	Gold	Silver	Bronze	Total
1	Chile	2	0	1	3
2	Belgium	1	0	0	1
2	China	1	0	0	1
4	France	0	1	0	1
4	Germany	0	1	0	1
4	Spain	0	1	0	1
4	United States	0	1	0	1
8	Argentina	0	0	1	1
8	Australia	0	0	1	1
8	Croatia	0	0	1	1
Totals (10 entries)		4	4	4	12
