= Tennis at the 2004 Summer Olympics – Women's singles =

Women's singles
- Tennis at the 2004 Summer Olympics

Final
- Champion: Justine Henin (BEL)
- Runner-up: Amélie Mauresmo (FRA)
- Score: 6–3, 6–3

Events
Singles	men	women
Doubles	men	women
- Summer Olympics

Women's singles tennis at the Games of the XXVIII Olympiad
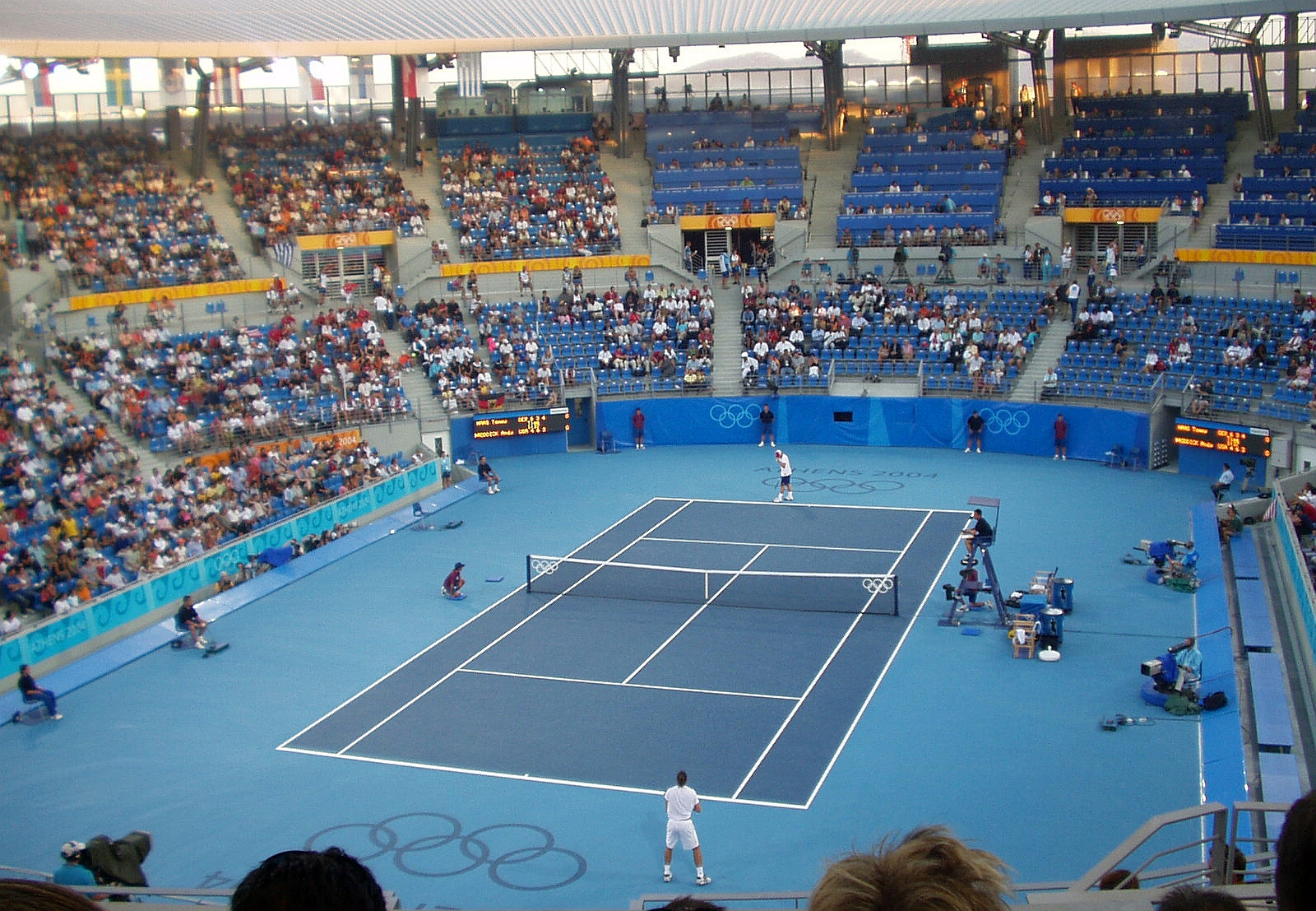
- Tennis at the 2004 Olympics
- Venue: Athens Olympic Tennis Centre
- Dates: 15–21 August 2004
- Competitors: 64 from 32 nations

Medalists
1st place, gold medalist(s)		Justine Henin	Belgium
2nd place, silver medalist(s)		Amélie Mauresmo	France
3rd place, bronze medalist(s)		Alicia Molik	Australia

Belgium's Justine Henin defeated France's Amélie Mauresmo in the final, 6–3, 6–3 to win the gold medal in Women's Singles tennis at the 2004 Summer Olympics. It was Belgium's only gold medal at the 2004 Games. Henin lost only one set during the tournament (to Russia's Anastasia Myskina in the semifinals). In the bronze medal match, Australia's Alicia Molik defeated Myskina, 6–3, 6–4. The medals were the first in women's singles for Belgium and Australia, and the first for France since 1924. The United States' three-Games gold medal streak at the event ended, with no American players reaching the quarter-finals.

The tournament was held from 15 to 21 August at the Athens Olympic Tennis Centre in Athens, Greece. There were 64 competitors from 32 nations, with each nation having up to 4 players (up from the 3 allowed in prior Games).

Venus Williams was the reigning gold medalist from 2000, but she lost in the third round to France's Mary Pierce.

== Background ==
This was the 10th appearance of the women's singles tennis. A women's event was held only once during the first three Games (only men's tennis was played in 1896 and 1904), but has been held at every Olympics for which there was a tennis tournament since 1908. Tennis was not a medal sport from 1928 to 1984, though there were demonstration events in 1968 and 1984.

Returning from the 2000 Games were gold medalist Venus Williams of the United States and silver medalist Elena Dementieva of Russia. Williams had struggled with injuries before the Games, and came in as the #6 seed. Justine Henin of Belgium was the #1, with Amélie Mauresmo of France #2. Three Russian players rounded out the top 5: Anastasia Myskina, Dementieva, and Svetlana Kuznetsova.

Former World No. 1 Serena Williams had committed to playing this event, but withdrew one week before the tournament began due to a left knee injury.

Bosnia and Herzegovina, Estonia, Puerto Rico, Serbia and Montenegro, and Ukraine each made their debut in the event. France made its ninth appearance, most among nations to that point, having missed only the 1908 Games in London (when only British players competed).

== Qualification ==
Qualification for the single tournament was restricted to four players per National Olympic Committee (NOC), an organisation representing a country at the Olympics. National Tennis Associations who were members of the ITF before 1 January 2004 were allowed to nominate players for entry into the competition. The tournament featured a total of 64 players with 48 qualifying on their WTA World Ranking on 14 June and two received invitations from the Tripartite Commission. Any NOC who had more than four players able to qualify by this method were encouraged to choose their highest ranked players eligible to compete in the tournament. The remaining 14 qualified via wild card places: eight were selected on their world ranking and the remaining six were chosen on the basis of her world ranking, whether her country has representation in tennis, the number of players who were in Athens and her geographical location.

Players who earned automatic entry into the draw and who withdrew from the competition due to illness, injury or bereavement before midnight on 7 August were replaced by one from her own country or the next highest ranking entry. Had this not been the case, then the ITF selected the highest ranked nominated player or eligible competitor if a country had more than four players to the tournament.

== Competition format ==
The competition was a single-elimination tournament with a bronze medal match. Matches were all best-of-three sets. The 12-point tie-breaker was used in any set, except the third, that reached 6–6.

== Schedule ==
All times are Greece Standard Time (UTC+2)

The schedule was condensed compared to previous Games, taking only 8 days rather than 11 to complete.

Date	Time	Round
Sunday, 15 August 2004; Monday, 16 August 2004		Round of 64
Tuesday, 17 August 2004		Round of 32
Wednesday, 18 August 2004		Round of 16
Thursday, 19 August 2004		Quarterfinals
Friday, 20 August 2004	17:00	Semifinals
Saturday, 21 August 2004	17:00	Bronze medal match Final

== Seeds ==
1. Justine Henin (BEL) (champion, gold medalist)
2. Amélie Mauresmo (FRA) (final, silver medalist)
3. Anastasia Myskina (RUS) (semifinals, fourth place)
4. Elena Dementieva (RUS) (first round)
5. Svetlana Kuznetsova (RUS) (quarterfinals)
6. Venus Williams (USA) (third round)
7. Paola Suárez (ARG) (second round)
8. Ai Sugiyama (JPN) (quarterfinals)
9. Nadia Petrova (RUS) (second round)
10. Patty Schnyder (SUI) (third round)
11. Francesca Schiavone (ITA) (quarterfinals)
12. Karolina Šprem (CRO) (third round)
13. Anna Smashnova (ISR) (first round)
14. Silvia Farina Elia (ITA) (second round)
15. Magdalena Maleeva (BUL) (second round)
16. Chanda Rubin (USA) (third round)

== Draw ==
=== Finals ===
Quarterfinals
1	Justine Henin (BEL)	6	6
Mary Pierce (FRA)	4	4
3	Anastasia Myskina (RUS)	6	6
11	Francesca Schiavone (ITA)	1	2
8	Ai Sugiyama (JPN)	3	4
Alicia Molik (AUS)	6	6
5	Svetlana Kuznetsova (RUS)	6^{5}	6	2
2	Amélie Mauresmo (FRA)	7	4	6

Semifinals
1	Justine Henin (BEL)	7	5	8
3	Anastasia Myskina (RUS)	5	7	6
Alicia Molik (AUS)	6^{8}	3
2	Amélie Mauresmo (FRA)	7	6

Final
1	Justine Henin (BEL)	6	6
2	Amélie Mauresmo (FRA)	3	3
Third place
3	Anastasia Myskina (RUS)	3	4
Alicia Molik (AUS)	6	6

=== Top half ===
==== Section 1 ====
First round
1	J Henin (BEL)	6	6
B Strýcová (CZE)	3	4
M Vento-Kabchi (VEN)	6	6
A Kremer (LUX)	3	4
N Pratt (AUS)	6	7
M Casanova (SUI)	3	5
T Garbin (ITA)	6	6
13	A Smashnova (ISR)	2	1
9	N Petrova (RUS)	6	6
M Suchá (SVK)	3	3
A Medina Garrigues (ESP)	3	5
M Pierce (FRA)	6	7
M Matevžič (SLO)	7	7
S Obata (JPN)	6^{3}	5
M Czink (HUN)	1	2
6	V Williams (USA)	6	6

Quarter-finals
1	J Henin (BEL)	6	6
M Vento-Kabchi (VEN)	2	1
N Pratt (AUS)	1	7	6
T Garbin (ITA)	6	6^{5}	2
9	N Petrova (RUS)	2	1
M Pierce (FRA)	6	6
M Matevžič (SLO)	0	0
6	V Williams (USA)	6	6

3rd Round
1	J Henin (BEL)	6	6
N Pratt (AUS)	1	0
M Pierce (FRA)	6	6
6	V Williams (USA)	4	4

Quarterfinals
1	J Henin (BEL)	6	6
M Pierce (FRA)	4	4

==== Section 2 ====
First round
3	A Myskina (RUS)	6	6
M Serna (ESP)	0	1
K Brandi (PUR)	7	6
J Kostanić (CRO)	5	1
C Castaño (COL)	2	1
E Daniilidou (GRE)	6	6
K Koukalová (CZE)	1	4
15	M Maleeva (BUL)	6	6
11	F Schiavone (ITA)	6	7
S Asagoe (JPN)	3	6^{4}
K Kanepi (EST)	6^{1}	1
Y-j Cho (KOR)	7	6
J Janković (SCG)	4	1
F Zuluaga (COL)	6	6
N Dechy (FRA)	7	6^{5}	7
7	P Suárez (ARG)	6^{1}	7	9

Quarter-finals
3	A Myskina (RUS)	6	3	6
K Brandi (PUR)	2	6	4
E Daniilidou (GRE)	2	6	6
15	M Maleeva (BUL)	6	4	4
11	F Schiavone (ITA)	2	7	6
Y-j Cho (KOR)	6	6^{0}	4
F Zuluaga (COL)	4	7	6
7	P Suárez (ARG)	6	6^{1}	1

3rd Round
3	A Myskina (RUS)	7	6
E Daniilidou (GRE)	5	4
11	F Schiavone (ITA)	6^{5}	6	6
F Zuluaga (COL)	7	1	3

Quarterfinals
3	A Myskina (RUS)	6	6
11	F Schiavone (ITA)	1	2

=== Bottom half ===
==== Section 3 ====
First round
8	A Sugiyama (JPN)	4	6	8
J Zheng (CHN)	6	3	6
T Perebiynis (UKR)	6	6
D Randriantefy (MAD)	3	4
T Tanasugarn (THA)	6	2	1
A Widjaja (INA)	1	6	6
G Dulko (ARG)	6^{6}	5
12	K Šprem (CRO)	7	7
14	S Farina Elia (ITA)	6	6
PR	S Testud (FRA)	2	0
Ľ Kurhajcová (SVK)	4	6	3
L Raymond (USA)	6	4	6
M Sánchez Lorenzo (ESP)	3	6	4
K Srebotnik (SLO)	6	0	6
A Molik (AUS)	4	6	6
4	E Dementieva (RUS)	6	0	3

Quarter-finals
8	A Sugiyama (JPN)	7	6
T Perebiynis (UKR)	5	4
A Widjaja (INA)	3	1
12	K Šprem (CRO)	6	6
14	S Farina Elia (ITA)	1	2
L Raymond (USA)	6	6
K Srebotnik (SLO)	5	4
A Molik (AUS)	7	6

3rd Round
8	A Sugiyama (JPN)	7	6
12	K Šprem (CRO)	6^{6}	1
L Raymond (USA)	4	4
A Molik (AUS)	6	6

Quarterfinals
8	A Sugiyama (JPN)	3	4
A Molik (AUS)	6	6

==== Section 4 ====
First round
5	S Kuznetsova (RUS)	6	6
M Díaz Oliva (ARG)	3	3
A Morigami (JPN)	6	6
I Benešová (CZE)	1	4
D Hantuchová (SVK)	6	6
C Schaul (LUX)	1	1
P Mandula (HUN)	3	4
10	P Schnyder (SUI)	6	6
16	C Rubin (USA)	6	6^{8}	6
S Stosur (AUS)	2	7	0
C Black (ZIM)	6	5	6
T Pisnik (SLO)	3	7	4
M Jugić-Salkić (BIH)	3	4
ME Camerin (ITA)	6	6
C Martínez (ESP)	1	4
2	A Mauresmo (FRA)	6	6

Quarter-finals
5	S Kuznetsova (RUS)	7	6
A Morigami (JPN)	6^{5}	2
D Hantuchová (SVK)	6	1	4
10	P Schnyder (SUI)	3	6	6
16	C Rubin (USA)	6	3	6
C Black (ZIM)	4	6	3
ME Camerin (ITA)	0	1
2	A Mauresmo (FRA)	6	6

3rd Round
5	S Kuznetsova (RUS)	6	6
10	P Schnyder (SUI)	3	3
16	C Rubin (USA)	3	1
2	A Mauresmo (FRA)	6	6

Quarterfinals
5	S Kuznetsova (RUS)	6^{5}	6	2
2	A Mauresmo (FRA)	7	4	6
