= Tennis at the 2004 Summer Olympics – Men's singles =

Men's singles
- Tennis at the 2004 Summer Olympics

Final
- Champion: (Chile) Nicolás Massú
- Runner-up: (United States) Mardy Fish
- Score: 6–3, 3–6, 2–6, 6–3, 6–4

Events
Singles	men	women
Doubles	men	women
- Summer Olympics

Men's singles tennis at the Games of the XXVIII Olympiad
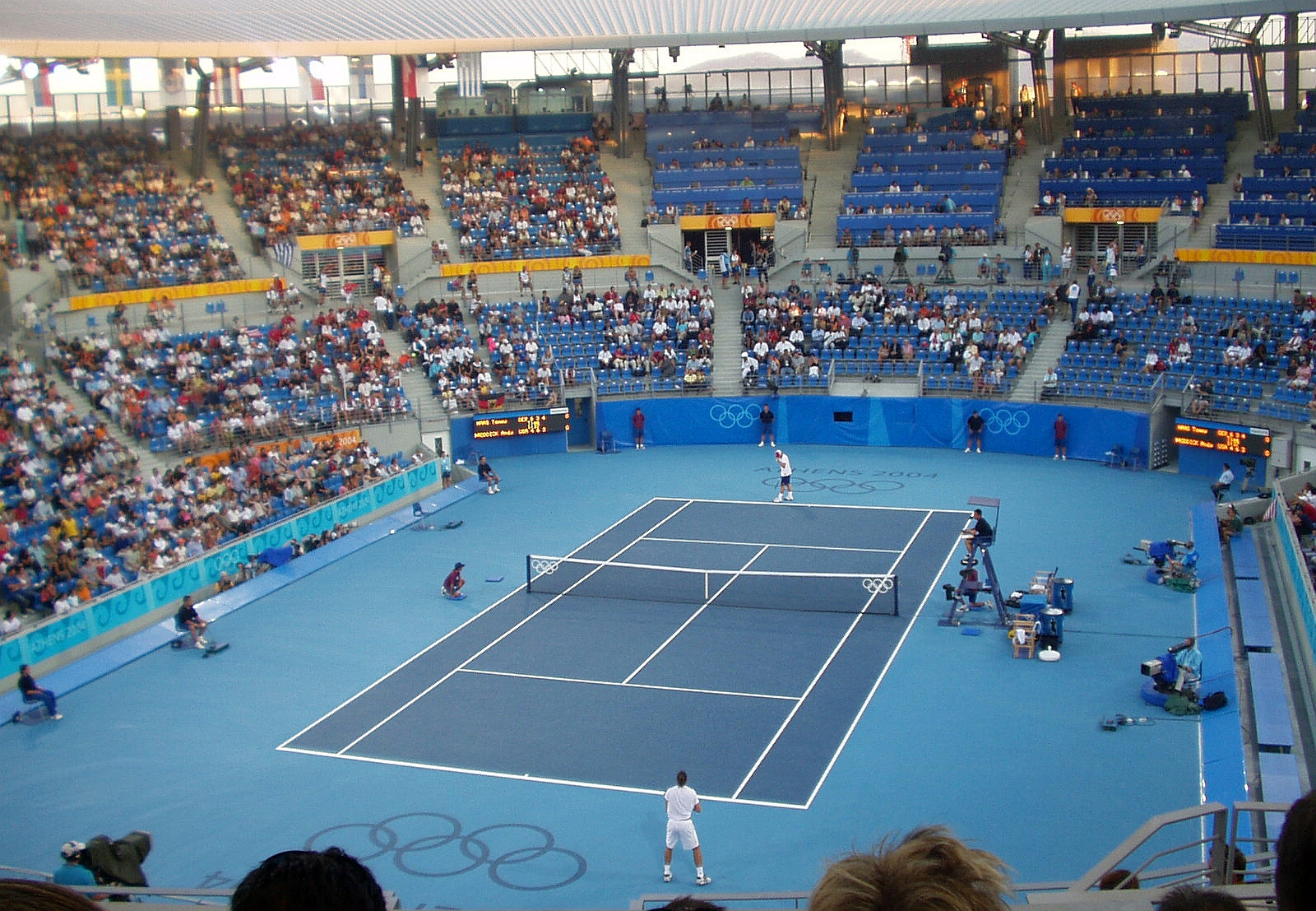
- Tennis as the 2004 Olympics
- Venue: Athens Olympic Tennis Centre, Athens
- Dates: 15–22 August 2004
- Competitors: 64 from 32 nations

Medalists
1st place, gold medalist(s)		Nicolás Massú; Chile
2nd place, silver medalist(s)		Mardy Fish; United States
3rd place, bronze medalist(s)		Fernando González; Chile

Chile's Nicolás Massú defeated the United States' Mardy Fish in the final, 6–3, 3–6, 2–6, 6–3, 6–4 to win the gold medal in men's singles tennis at the 2004 Summer Olympics. In the bronze-medal match, Chile's Fernando González defeated the United States' Taylor Dent, 6–4, 2–6, 16–14. Massú became the only man to win both the singles and men's doubles gold medals at the same Olympic Games. The two medals were Chile's first in men's singles, and Massú's gold plus the Chileans' doubles gold were the only two gold medals for Chile at the Olympics, until shooter Francisca Crovetto's gold obtained at the 2024 Summer Olympics.

The tournament was held at the Olympic Tennis Centre in Athens, Greece. There were 64 players from 32 nations. The limit on players per nation had been four since the 2000 Games. Only the final match was best-of-five-sets; all others were best-of-three-sets.

Yevgeny Kafelnikov of Russia was the reigning gold medalist from 2000, but he retired from the sport in 2003.

Switzerland's Roger Federer was the world No. 1, but he lost to world No. 74 Tomáš Berdych of the Czech Republic in the second round.

The medals for the competition were presented by René Fasel, IOC Member, Switzerland; and the medalists' bouquets were presented by Francesco Ricci Bitti, ITF President; Italy.

== Background ==
The men's singles tournament of the 2004 Summer Olympics was held at the Athens Olympic Tennis Centre in Athens, Greece from 15 to 22 August 2004. Tennis was one of the original sports of the 1896 Summer Olympics. It was withdrawn after the 1924 Summer Olympics due to disagreements between the sport's governing body, the International Tennis Federation (ITF), and the independent Olympic organisation, the International Olympic Committee (IOC) over how to define amateur athletes. The IOC reinstated Tennis to the Olympic programme as a demonstration sport at the 1968 Games and the 1984 Olympics before returning as a full medal sport open to all players at the 1988 Games. The 2004 tournament was the 12th official medal event in men's singles.

Five of the eight quarterfinalists from the 2000 tournament returned: silver medalist Tommy Haas of Germany, fourth-place finisher Roger Federer of Switzerland, and three men eliminated in the quarterfinals: Max Mirnyi of Belarus, Juan Carlos Ferrero of Spain, and Gustavo Kuerten of Brazil.

Algeria, Chinese Taipei, and Cyprus each made their debut in the event. France made its 11th appearance, most among all nations, having missed only the 1904 event.

== Qualification ==
Qualification for the single tournament was restricted to four players per National Olympic Committee (NOC), an organisation representing a country at the Olympics. National Tennis Associations who were members of the ITF before 1 January 2004 were allowed to nominate players for entry into the competition. The tournament featured a total of 64 players with 48 qualifying on their ITF World Ranking on 14 June and two received invitations from the Tripartite Commission. Any NOC who had more than four players able to qualify by this method were encouraged to choose their highest ranked players eligible to compete in the tournament. The remaining 14 qualified via wild card places: eight were selected on their world ranking and the remaining six were chosen on the basis of his world ranking, whether his country has representation in tennis, the number of players who were in Athens and his geographical location.

Players who earned automatic entry into the draw and who withdrew from the competition due to illness, injury or bereavement before midnight on 7 August were replaced by one from his own country or the next highest ranking entry. Had this not been the case, then the ITF selected the highest ranked nominated player or eligible competitor if a country had more than four players to the tournament.

== Preview ==
Sixteen players were seeded according to their final position in the ITF world rankings by the referee of the competition. The 2003 Wimbledon champion Roger Federer was seeded first, Andy Roddick was the second seed, Carlos Moyá was seed third and Tim Henman was seeded fourth. Martin Verkerk, the 2003 French Open runner-up, sustained a chest muscle injury that required him to withdraw from the tournament. Verkerk was replaced in the draw by Wayne Arthurs. World number three Guillermo Coria had a right shoulder tendinitis injury that made it sore and withdrew from the competition with his place taken by world number 40 Mariano Zabaleta. World number five and 2004 French Open champion Gastón Gaudio aggravated a post-traumatic right heel injury and right shoulder pain playing in the 2004 Cincinnati Masters and became the second Argentine to withdraw from the competition. His compatriot and world number 50 Agustín Calleri replaced him. David Nalbandian, the 2002 Wimbledon runner-up, withdrew with a strained left thigh and he was the third Argentine player to leave the event. Frédéric Niemeyer replaced him in the draw. A right wrist injury caused Irakli Labadze to withdraw from the tournament and Vladimir Voltchkov, a 2000 Wimbledon semi-finalist, replaced him.

Federer was considered by the press as the strong favourite before the tournament. Henman, who had played in two previous Olympic Games, commented on his chances of victory, "Federer goes into the event favourite, there's no doubt about that. And [Andy] Roddick will fancy his chances on a hard court. But I've beaten both of them this year so, if I can stay healthy and execute my intended game-plan, then there's a chance for me too. I'd be lying if I said I haven't dreamed of winning the gold medal." Roddick used his pre-tournament press conference to state that he wanted to medal at the Olympics and was concerned about his opponent in the first round.

== Ranking points ==
The breakdown of ranking points towards the ATP rankings is shown below:

Stage	Gold medal	Silver medal	Bronze medal	Fourth place	Quarterfinals	Round of 16	Round of 32	Round of 64
ATP Entry Ranking points	400	280	205	155	100	50	25	5
ATP Champions Race points	80	56	41	31	20	10	5	1

== Tournament summary ==
The tournament was a single elimination competition with a bronze-medal match. The competition was played on hard courts as the best-of-three sets in every match until the gold medal game, which was held to the best-of-five sets.

=== Round 1 ===
The draw for the first round of the championship was made on 12 August in Building H of the Athens 2004 Conference Room at ATHOC Headquarters. The first round of the competition, in which 64 players participated, took place from 15 to 16 August. Roddick took a 6–3, 7–6 straight sets victory over Flávio Saretta as wild card entrant Arthurs defeated Victor Hănescu 6–4, 7–6. Marcos Baghdatis, the 2003 ITF Junior World champion and a player who received funding from Olympic Solidarity, recovered from one set behind to win 5–7, 7–6, 7–5 over Grégory Carraz.A 6–3, 6–1 triumph came for the fifth seed Juan Carlos Ferrero against Hicham Arazi before Max Mirnyi caused an upset over the 11th seed Juan Ignacio Chela by taking a 3–6, 7–6, 6–4 win. Henman, a silver medallist in the 1996 Olympic doubles event, was the highest placed seed to lose in the first round when he lost to world number 27 Jiří Novák 6–3, 6–3 due to an inconsistent and error-prone play in a 68-minute match that took place in blustery weather.

Marat Safin, a seeded player regarded as one who was in danger of elimination, won the first set of his match against Karol Kučera within 20 minutes. After Kučera played less cautiously in the second set, a break in the fifth game saw Safin claim a 6–0, 6–4 victory. Moyá, the 1998 French Open champion, took almost three hours and a total of five match points in the final two sets of his game against Thomas Enqvist to win 7–6, 6–7, 9–7. Paradorn Srichaphan, the 12th seed, was upset by Joachim Johansson in a 6–3, 6–3 straight sets defeat, and another upset victory occurred when the 13th seed Andrei Pavel lost to Ivo Karlović. Olivier Rochus came from a set behind Mark Philippoussis, who played in his first match in four weeks since after receiving artificial cartilage injections into his left knee, to claim a 3–6, 6–0, 6–1 victory. Philippoussis had tendinitis in his left knee that caused discomfort during the match and affected his movement. Federer took 1¾ hours to defeat Nikolay Davydenko 6–3, 5–7, 6–1. He received an official warning for ball abuse when he struck the ball onto the roof of the centre court in frustration over his play in the second set.

=== Round 2 ===
The second round occurred on 17 August. Calleri withdrew at this stage of the tournament because of strain to his left abdominal, giving his opponent Igor Andreev a walkover into the third round and no players from Argentina left in the competition. Unseeded player and world number 49 Mardy Fish came from one set and a break point behind to claim a 4–6, 7–6 (7-5), 6–4 victory over former world number one Juan Carlos Ferrero. Fish said of his win, "There were a lot of Spanish people out there cheering for him. So whoever was cheering for me, I was pointing at them." Another second round winner from the United States came in the form of Taylor Dent, who recovered from a slow start to defeat Dominik Hrbatý 7–6, 6–4.

Roddick made 17 aces, 30 winners and 57 unforced errors in coming back from two match points behind and defeating the 2000 silver medallist Tommy Haas 6–4, 3–6, 9–7 in a 2-hour and 19 minute match. Federer was the highest ranked player to lose in the second round when world number 74 Tomáš Berdych beat him 4–6, 7–5, 7–5 due to a poor serve and a series of unforced errors. Berdych said of the victory, "It was everything. This guy won Wimbledon and the Australian Open and now you are the player who beats him. Unbelievable." Moyá defeated Olivier Rochus 6–0, 7–6 and tenth seed Nicolás Massú won 7–6, 6–2 over Vince Spadea.

== Schedule ==
All times are Greece Standard Time (UTC+2)

The schedule was condensed compared to previous Games, taking only 8 days rather than 11 to complete.

Date	Time	Round
Sunday, 15 August 2004; Monday, 16 August 2004		Round of 64
Tuesday, 17 August 2004		Round of 32
Wednesday, 18 August 2004		Round of 16
Thursday, 19 August 2004		Quarterfinals
Friday, 20 August 2004	17:00	Semifinals
Saturday, 21 August 2004	17:00	Bronze medal match
Sunday, 22 August 2004		Final

== Seeds ==
1. Roger Federer (SUI) (second round)
2. Andy Roddick (USA) (third round)
3. Carlos Moyá (ESP) (quarterfinals)
4. Tim Henman (GBR) (first round)
5. Juan Carlos Ferrero (ESP) (second round)
6. David Nalbandian (ARG) (withdrew)
7. Rainer Schüttler (GER) (first round)
8. Sébastien Grosjean (FRA) (quarterfinals)
9. Marat Safin (RUS) (second round)
10. Nicolás Massú (CHI) (champion, gold medalist)
11. Juan Ignacio Chela (ARG) (first round)
12. Paradorn Srichaphan (THA) (first round)
13. Andrei Pavel (ROM) (first round)
14. Nicolas Kiefer (GER) (third round)
15. Tommy Robredo (ESP) (third round)
16. Fernando González (CHI) (semifinals, bronze medalist)

== Draw ==
=== Finals ===
Quarterfinals
Tomáš Berdych (CZE)	4	1
Taylor Dent (USA)	6	6
3	Carlos Moyá (ESP)	2	5
10	Nicolás Massú (CHI)	6	7
Mardy Fish (USA)	6	6
Mikhail Youzhny (RUS)	3	4
8	Sébastien Grosjean (FRA)	2	6	2
16	Fernando González (CHI)	6	2	6

Semifinals
Taylor Dent (USA)	6^{5}	1
10	Nicolás Massú (CHI)	7^{7}	6
Mardy Fish (USA)	3	6	6
16	Fernando González (CHI)	6	3	4

Final (gold-medal match)
10	Nicolás Massú (CHI)	6	3	2	6	6
Mardy Fish (USA)	3	6	6	3	4
Bronze-medal match
Taylor Dent (USA)	4	6	14
16	Fernando González (CHI)	6	2	16

=== Top half ===
==== Section 1 ====
1st round
1	R Federer (SUI)	6	5	6
N Davydenko (RUS)	3	7	1
T Berdych (CZE)	6	7
F Mayer (GER)	3	5
F Santoro (FRA)	6	6
F Volandri (ITA)	1	2
WC	L Ouahab (ALG)	3	4
15	T Robredo (ESP)	6	6
12	P Srichaphan (THA)	2	3
J Johansson (SWE)	6	6
S Sargsian (ARM)	3	2
I Ljubičić (CRO)	6	6
D Hrbatý (SVK)	6	6
Y El Aynaoui (MAR)	3	4
T Dent (USA)	6	3	6
Alt	F Niemeyer (CAN)	2	6	4

2nd round
1	R Federer (SUI)	6	5	5
T Berdych (CZE)	4	7	7
F Santoro (FRA)	6	3	4
15	T Robredo (ESP)	1	6	6
J Johansson (SWE)	6^{3}	4
I Ljubičić (CRO)	7^{7}	6
D Hrbatý (SVK)	6^{4}	3
T Dent (USA)	7^{7}	6

Third round
T Berdych (CZE)	7^{7}	4	8
15	T Robredo (ESP)	6^{2}	6	6
I Ljubičić (CRO)	4	4
T Dent (USA)	6	6

Quarterfinals
T Berdych (CZE)	4	1
T Dent (USA)	6	6

==== Section 2 ====
1st round
3	C Moyá (ESP)	7^{10}	6^{7}	9
T Enqvist (SWE)	6^{8}	7^{9}	7
M Philippoussis (AUS)	6	0	1
O Rochus (BEL)	3	6	6
A Clément (FRA)	7^{7}	6
N Lapentti (ECU)	6^{5}	2
I Karlović (CRO)	6	6^{10}	6
13	A Pavel (ROU)	4	7^{12}	2
10	N Massú (CHI)	6	5	6
G Kuerten (BRA)	3	7	4
J Melzer (AUT)	0	1
V Spadea (USA)	6	6
A Calleri (ARG)	2	6	8
K Beck (SVK)	6	3	6
I Andreev (RUS)	6^{5}	7^{7}	6
7	R Schüttler (GER)	7^{7}	6^{2}	2

2nd round
3	C Moyá (ESP)	6	7^{7}
O Rochus (BEL)	0	6^{3}
A Clément (FRA)	6^{4}	6	4
I Karlović (CRO)	7^{7}	4	6
10	N Massú (CHI)	7^{7}	6
V Spadea (USA)	6^{3}	2
A Calleri (ARG)
I Andreev (RUS)	w/o

Third round
3	C Moyá (ESP)	4	7^{7}	6
I Karlović (CRO)	6	6^{3}	4
10	N Massú (CHI)	6	6^{4}	6
I Andreev (RUS)	3	7^{7}	4

Quarterfinals
3	C Moyá (ESP)	2	5
10	N Massú (CHI)	6	7

=== Bottom half ===
==== Section 3 ====
1st round
5	JC Ferrero (ESP)	6	6
H Arazi (MAR)	3	1
M Fish (USA)	7^{9}	1
J Björkman (SWE)	6^{7}	0	r
J Nieminen (FIN)	6	6
Y-h Lu (TPE)	3	3
M Mirnyi (BLR)	3	7^{7}	6
11	JI Chela (ARG)	6	6^{0}	4
14	N Kiefer (GER)	6	6
V Voltchkov (BLR)	2	4
G Carraz (FRA)	7	6^{5}	5
M Baghdatis (CYP)	5	7^{7}	7
M Youzhny (RUS)	6	6
X Malisse (BEL)	2	2
J Novák (CZE)	6	6
4	T Henman (GBR)	3	3

2nd round
5	JC Ferrero (ESP)	6	6^{5}	4
M Fish (USA)	4	7^{7}	6
J Nieminen (FIN)	3	4
M Mirnyi (BLR)	6	6
14	N Kiefer (GER)	6	3	6
M Baghdatis (CYP)	2	6	3
M Youzhny (RUS)	6	6
J Novák (CZE)	4	3

Third round
M Fish (USA)	6	4	6
M Mirnyi (BLR)	3	6	1
14	N Kiefer (GER)	3	6	2
M Youzhny (RUS)	6	2	6

Quarterfinals
M Fish (USA)	6	6
M Youzhny (RUS)	3	4

==== Section 4 ====
1st round
8	S Grosjean (FRA)	6	7
L Horna (PER)	2	5
V Hănescu (ROU)	4	6^{4}
W Arthurs (AUS)	6	7^{7}
R Söderling (SWE)	3	6	4
F López (ESP)	6	3	6
K Kučera (SVK)	0	4
9	M Safin (RUS)	6	6
16	F González (CHI)	7^{7}	6
K Economidis (GRE)	6^{2}	2
M Zabaleta (ARG)	6	3	2
H-t Lee (KOR)	4	6	6
M Ančić (CRO)	1	5
T Haas (GER)	6	7
F Saretta (BRA)	3	6^{4}
2	A Roddick (USA)	6	7^{7}

2nd round
8	S Grosjean (FRA)	7^{7}	6
W Arthurs (AUS)	6^{2}	3
F López (ESP)	7^{7}	6
9	M Safin (RUS)	6^{4}	3
16	F González (CHI)	7	6
H-t Lee (KOR)	5	2
T Haas (GER)	6	3	7
2	A Roddick (USA)	4	6	9

Third round
8	S Grosjean (FRA)	6^{4}	6	6
F López (ESP)	7^{7}	4	0
16	F González (CHI)	6	6
2	A Roddick (USA)	4	4

Quarterfinals
8	S Grosjean (FRA)	2	6	4
16	F González (CHI)	6	2	6
