= Tennis at the 2004 Summer Olympics – Men's doubles =

Men's doubles
- Tennis at the 2004 Summer Olympics

Final
- Champions: Fernando González (Chile) Nicolás Massú (CHI)
- Runners-up: Nicolas Kiefer (Germany) Rainer Schüttler (GER)
- Score: 6–2, 4–6, 3–6, 7–6^{(9–7)}, 6–4

Events
Singles	men	women
Doubles	men	women
- Summer Olympics

Men's doubles at the Games of the XXVIII Olympiad
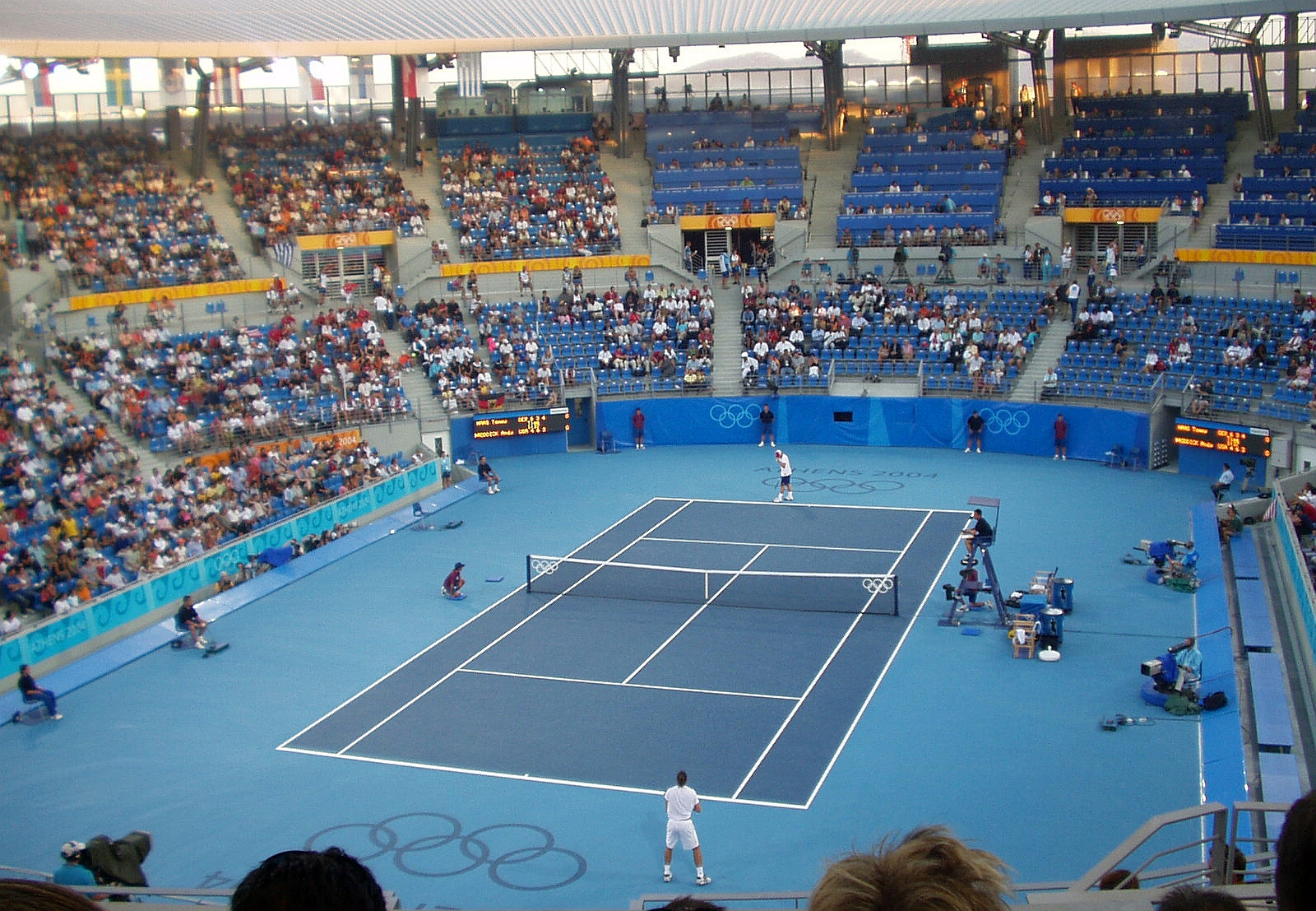
- Tennis as the 2004 Olympics
- Venue: Athens Olympic Tennis Centre
- Dates: 15–21 August 2004
- Competitors: 30 teams (60 players) from 24 nations

Medalists
1st place, gold medalist(s)		Fernando González; Nicolás Massú; Chile
2nd place, silver medalist(s)		Nicolas Kiefer; Rainer Schüttler; Germany
3rd place, bronze medalist(s)		Mario Ančić; Ivan Ljubičić; Croatia

Chile's Fernando González and Nicolás Massú defeated Germany's Nicolas Kiefer and Rainer Schüttler in the final, 6–2, 4–6, 3–6, 7–6^{(9–7)}, 6–4 to win the gold medal in Men's Doubles tennis at the 2004 Summer Olympics. They saved four consecutive championship points in the 4th set tiebreak en route to their win. It was Chile's first ever Olympic gold medal. Massú and González also won gold and bronze, respectively, in the singles competition. Germany won its third medal in four Games in the event. In the bronze medal match, Croatia's Mario Ančić and Ivan Ljubičić defeated India's Mahesh Bhupathi and Leander Paes, 7–6^{(7–5)}, 4–6, 16–14. It was Croatia's first medal in men's doubles since 1992.

The tournament held between 15 and 21 August at the Olympic Tennis Centre in Athens, Greece. There were 30 pairs from 24 nations, with the Belarusian pair and one of the Swedish pairs not starting. For the first time since tennis returned in 1988, nations could enter more than one pair; the limit was now two pairs (four players).

World No. 1 team Bob Bryan and Mike Bryan of the United States were defeated in the quarterfinals by González and Massú.

The medals for the competition were presented by Shamil Tarpischev, IOC Member, Russia; and the bouquets were present by Christine Ungricht, ITF Board Member; Switzerland.

== Background ==
This was the 12th appearance of men's doubles tennis. The event has been held at every Summer Olympics where tennis has been on the program: from 1896 to 1924 and then from 1988 to the current program. A demonstration event was held in 1968.

Mark Woodforde had retired after the 2000 Games, ending The Woodies partnership with Todd Woodbridge that had earned gold in 1996 and silver in 2000. Woodbridge played in his fourth Games, with partner Wayne Arthurs (tennis)—still a formidable pairing, and the number two seed in Athens. The new top team, however, was the American pair of Bryan brothers, Bob Bryan and Mike Bryan. 2000 gold medalist Daniel Nestor of Canada returned with a new partner, Frédéric Niemeyer.

Poland made its debut in the event. France made its ninth appearance in the event, matching the absent Great Britain for most of all nations.

== Competition format ==
The competition was a single-elimination tournament with a bronze medal match. All matches except the final were best-of-three sets; the final was best-of-five. Tiebreaks were used for any set before the third (fifth in the final) that reached 6–6.

== Schedule ==
All times are Greece Standard Time (UTC+2)

Date	Time	Round
Sunday, 15 August 2004; Monday, 16 August 2004		Round of 32
Tuesday, 17 August 2004		Round of 16
Wednesday, 18 August 2004		Quarterfinals
Thursday, 19 August 2004		Semifinals
Friday, 20 August 2004		Bronze medal match
Saturday, 21 August 2004		Final

== Seeds ==
1. Bob Bryan / Mike Bryan (USA) (quarterfinals)
2. Wayne Arthurs / Todd Woodbridge (AUS) (second round)
3. Michaël Llodra / Fabrice Santoro (FRA) (quarterfinals)
4. Wayne Black / Kevin Ullyett (ZIM) (quarterfinals)
5. Mahesh Bhupathi / Leander Paes (IND) (semifinals, fourth place)
6. Gastón Etlis / Martín Rodríguez (ARG) (second round)
7. Martin Damm / Cyril Suk (CZE) (second round)
8. Jonathan Erlich / Andy Ram (ISR) (quarterfinals)

== Draw ==
=== Finals ===
Semifinals
Fernando González (CHI); Nicolás Massú (CHI)	7	4	6
Mario Ančić (CRO); Ivan Ljubičić (CRO)	5	6	4
5	Mahesh Bhupathi (IND); Leander Paes (IND)	2	3
Nicolas Kiefer (GER); Rainer Schüttler (GER)	6	6

Finals
Fernando González (CHI); Nicolás Massú (CHI)	6	4	3	7^{9}	6
Nicolas Kiefer (GER); Rainer Schüttler (GER)	2	6	6	6^{7}	4
Third place
Mario Ančić (CRO); Ivan Ljubičić (CRO)	7^{7}	4	16
5	Mahesh Bhupathi (IND); Leander Paes (IND)	6^{5}	6	14

=== Top half ===
1st round
1	B Bryan (USA); M Bryan (USA)	6	6
M Safin (RUS); M Youzhny (RUS)	1	2
H Arazi (MAR); Y El Aynaoui (MAR)
M Mirnyi (BLR); V Voltchkov (BLR)	w/o
F González (CHI); N Massú (CHI)	7	6
M Knowles (BAH); M Merklein (BAH)	5	4
F López (ESP); T Robredo (ESP)	3	4
6	G Etlis (ARG); M Rodríguez (ARG)	6	6
3	M Llodra (FRA); F Santoro (FRA)	6	6
X Malisse (BEL); O Rochus (BEL)	3	2
D Nestor (CAN); F Niemeyer (CAN)	6	7
K Beck (SVK); D Hrbatý (SVK)	2	5
M Ančić (CRO); I Ljubičić (CRO)	w/o
J Björkman (SWE); J Johansson (SWE)
K Economidis (GRE); V Mazarakis (GRE)	1	3
7	M Damm (CZE); C Suk (CZE)	6	6

2nd round
1	B Bryan (USA); M Bryan (USA)	6	6
M Mirnyi (BLR); V Voltchkov (BLR)	3	3
F González (CHI); N Massú (CHI)	6	7^{7}
6	G Etlis (ARG); M Rodríguez (ARG)	3	6^{2}
3	M Llodra (FRA); F Santoro (FRA)	6	6^{5}	6
D Nestor (CAN); F Niemeyer (CAN)	3	7^{7}	3
M Ančić (CRO); I Ljubičić (CRO)	7^{8}	6^{2}	7
7	M Damm (CZE); C Suk (CZE)	6^{6}	7^{7}	5

Quarterfinals
1	B Bryan (USA); M Bryan (USA)	5	4
F González (CHI); N Massú (CHI)	7	6
3	M Llodra (FRA); F Santoro (FRA)	6	3	7
M Ančić (CRO); I Ljubičić (CRO)	4	6	9

Semifinals
F González (CHI); N Massú (CHI)	7	4	6
M Ančić (CRO); I Ljubičić (CRO)	5	6	4

=== Bottom half ===
1st round
5	M Bhupathi (IND); L Paes (IND)	7^{7}	6
M Fish (USA); A Roddick (USA)	6^{5}	3
Y Allegro (SUI); R Federer (SUI)	6	6
M Fyrstenberg (POL); M Matkowski (POL)	3	2
C Moyà (ESP); R Nadal (ESP)	6^{6}	1
A Sá (BRA); F Saretta (BRA)	7^{8}	6
A Clément (FRA); S Grosjean (FRA)	7	4	7
4	W Black (ZIM); K Ullyett (ZIM)	5	6	9
8	J Erlich (ISR); A Ram (ISR)	7	6
T Enqvist (SWE); R Söderling (SWE)	5	3
I Andreev (RUS); N Davydenko (RUS)	3	6	6
JI Chela (ARG); M Zabaleta (ARG)	6	3	4
V Hănescu (ROU); A Pavel (ROU)	5	6^{3}
N Kiefer (GER); R Schüttler (GER)	7	7^{7}
T Berdych (CZE); J Novák (CZE)	4	3
2	W Arthurs (AUS); T Woodbridge (AUS)	6	6

2nd round
5	M Bhupathi (IND); L Paes (IND)	6	7^{9}
Y Allegro (SUI); R Federer (SUI)	2	6^{7}
A Sá (BRA); F Saretta (BRA)	3	4
4	W Black (ZIM); K Ullyett (ZIM)	6	6
8	J Erlich (ISR); A Ram (ISR)	6	6
I Andreev (RUS); N Davydenko (RUS)	4	1
N Kiefer (GER); R Schüttler (GER)	7^{7}	6
2	W Arthurs (AUS); T Woodbridge (AUS)	6^{3}	3

Quarterfinals
5	M Bhupathi (IND); L Paes (IND)	6	6
4	W Black (ZIM); K Ullyett (ZIM)	4	4
8	J Erlich (ISR); A Ram (ISR)	6	2	2
N Kiefer (GER); R Schüttler (GER)	2	6	6

Semifinals
5	M Bhupathi (IND); L Paes (IND)	2	3
N Kiefer (GER); R Schüttler (GER)	6	6
