= Tennis at the 2004 Summer Olympics – Women's doubles =

Women's doubles
- Tennis at the 2004 Summer Olympics

Final
- Champions: Li Ting (China) Sun Tiantian (CHN)
- Runners-up: Conchita Martínez (Spain) Virginia Ruano Pascual (ESP)
- Score: 6–3, 6–3

Events
Singles	men	women
Doubles	men	women
- Summer Olympics

Women's doubles tennis at the Games of the XXVIII Olympiad
- Venue: Olympic Tennis Centre
- Date: 15 to 22 August 2004
- Competitors: 64 from 22 nations

Medalists
1st place, gold medalist(s)		Li Ting; Sun Tiantian	China
2nd place, silver medalist(s)		Conchita Martínez; Virginia Ruano Pascual	Spain
3rd place, bronze medalist(s)		Paola Suárez; Patricia Tarabini	Argentina

China's Li Ting and Sun Tiantian defeated Spain's Conchita Martínez and Virginia Ruano Pascual in the final, 6–3, 6–3 to win the gold medal in Women's Doubles tennis at the 2004 Summer Olympics. In the bronze medal match, Argentina's Paola Suárez and Patricia Tarabini defeated Japan's Shinobu Asagoe and Ai Sugiyama, 6–3, 6–3.

The tournament was held at the Olympic Tennis Centre in Athens, Greece. 64 competitors (32 teams) from 22 countries participated.

Serena Williams and Venus Williams were the reigning gold medalists, but Serena chose not to participate. Venus partnered with Chanda Rubin for the United States, but the pair lost in the first round to future winners Li and Sun.

== Medalists ==
Gold	Li Ting and Sun Tiantian; China
Silver	Conchita Martínez and Virginia Ruano Pascual; Spain
Bronze	Paola Suárez and Patricia Tarabini; Argentina

== Seeds ==
1. Svetlana Kuznetsova / Elena Likhovtseva (RUS) (second round)
2. Conchita Martínez / Virginia Ruano Pascual (ESP) (final, silver medalists)
3. Martina Navratilova / Lisa Raymond (USA) (quarterfinals)
4. Alicia Molik / Rennae Stubbs (AUS) (quarterfinals)
5. Shinobu Asagoe / Ai Sugiyama (JPN) (semifinals, fourth place)
6. Myriam Casanova / Patty Schnyder (SUI) (second round)
7. Paola Suárez / Patricia Tarabini (ARG) (semifinals, bronze medalists)
8. Li Ting / Sun Tiantian (CHN) (champions, gold medalists)

== Draw ==
=== Finals ===
Semifinals
7	Paola Suárez (ARG); Patricia Tarabini (ARG)	2	6	7
8	Li Ting (CHN); Sun Tiantian (CHN)	6	2	9
5	Shinobu Asagoe (JPN); Ai Sugiyama (JPN)	3	0
2	Conchita Martínez (ESP); Virginia Ruano Pascual (ESP)	6	6

Final
8	Li Ting (CHN); Sun Tiantian (CHN)	6	6
2	Conchita Martínez (ESP); Virginia Ruano Pascual (ESP)	3	3
Bronze medal match
7	Paola Suárez (ARG); Patricia Tarabini (ARG)	6	6
5	Shinobu Asagoe (JPN); Ai Sugiyama (JPN)	3	3

=== Top half ===
1st round
1	S Kuznetsova (RUS); E Likhovtseva (RUS)	6	3	6
L Průšová (CZE); B Strýcová (CZE)	2	6	1
N Dechy (FRA); S Testud (FRA)	7	6
T Križan (SLO); K Srebotnik (SLO)	5	3
A Morigami (JPN); S Obata (JPN)	3	7	6
M Czink (HUN); A Kapros (HUN)	6	5	3
A Medina Garrigues (ESP); A Sánchez Vicario (ESP)	7	5	2
7	P Suárez (ARG); P Tarabini (ARG)	6^{8}	7	6
4	A Molik (AUS); R Stubbs (AUS)	6	6
M Ani (EST); K Kanepi (EST)	4	1
A Kremer (LUX); C Schaul (LUX)	6^{7}	6	7
C Castaño (COL); F Zuluaga (COL)	7	2	9
S Farina Elia (ITA); F Schiavone (ITA)	6	6
Ľ Kurhajcová (SVK); M Suchá (SVK)	2	4
C Rubin (USA); V Williams (USA)	5	6	3
8	T Li (CHN); T Sun (CHN)	7	1	6

2nd round
1	S Kuznetsova (RUS); E Likhovtseva (RUS)	6	6^{5}	3
N Dechy (FRA); S Testud (FRA)	2	7	6
A Morigami (JPN); S Obata (JPN)	4	2
7	P Suárez (ARG); P Tarabini (ARG)	6	6
4	A Molik (AUS); R Stubbs (AUS)	6	6
C Castaño (COL); F Zuluaga (COL)	4	2
S Farina Elia (ITA); F Schiavone (ITA)	1	6^{1}
8	T Li (CHN); T Sun (CHN)	6	7

Quarterfinals
N Dechy (FRA); S Testud (FRA)	4	6	4
7	P Suárez (ARG); P Tarabini (ARG)	6	1	6
4	A Molik (AUS); R Stubbs (AUS)	3	2
8	T Li (CHN); T Sun (CHN)	6	6

Semifinals
7	P Suárez (ARG); P Tarabini (ARG)	2	6	7
8	T Li (CHN); T Sun (CHN)	6	2	9

=== Bottom half ===
1st round
5	S Asagoe (JPN); A Sugiyama (JPN)	5	7	6
E Dementieva (RUS); A Myskina (RUS)	7	5	3
W Prakusya (INA); A Widjaja (INA)	3	2
J Kostanić (CRO); K Šprem (CRO)	6	6
E Daniilidou (GRE); C Zachariadou (GRE)	5	1
A Mauresmo (FRA); M Pierce (FRA)	7	6
Y Beygelzimer (UKR); T Perebiynis (UKR)	0	2
3	M Navratilova (USA); L Raymond (USA)	6	6
6	M Casanova (SUI); P Schnyder (SUI)	6	6
D Hantuchová (SVK); J Husárová (SVK)	3	4
M Matevžič (SLO); T Pisnik (SLO)	2	1
Z Yan (CHN); J Zheng (CHN)	6	6
T Garbin (ITA); R Vinci (ITA)	6	6
N Pratt (AUS); S Stosur (AUS)	0	1
P Mandula (HUN); K Nagy (HUN)	4	0
2	C Martínez (ESP); V Ruano Pascual (ESP)	6	6

2nd round
5	S Asagoe (JPN); A Sugiyama (JPN)	6	7
J Kostanić (CRO); K Šprem (CRO)	3	5
A Mauresmo (FRA); M Pierce (FRA)
3	M Navratilova (USA); L Raymond (USA)	w/o
6	M Casanova (SUI); P Schnyder (SUI)	3	3
Z Yan (CHN); J Zheng (CHN)	6	6
T Garbin (ITA); R Vinci (ITA)	3	3
2	C Martínez (ESP); V Ruano Pascual (ESP)	6	6

Quarterfinals
5	S Asagoe (JPN); A Sugiyama (JPN)	6	4	6
3	M Navratilova (USA); L Raymond (USA)	4	6	4
Z Yan (CHN); J Zheng (CHN)	1	1
2	C Martínez (ESP); V Ruano Pascual (ESP)	6	6

Semifinals
5	S Asagoe (JPN); A Sugiyama (JPN)	3	0
2	C Martínez (ESP); V Ruano Pascual (ESP)	6	6
