= 1999 Dubai Tennis Championships – Singles =

Singles
- 1999 Dubai Tennis Championships

Final
- Champion: (France) Jérôme Golmard
- Runner-up: (Germany) Nicolas Kiefer
- Score: 6–4, 6–2

Details
- Draw: 32
- Seeds: 8

Events
| Singles | Doubles |
- Dubai Tennis Championships

Àlex Corretja was the defending champion, but lost in the first round to Andrew Ilie.

Jérôme Golmard won the title, defeating Nicolas Kiefer 6–4, 6–2 in the final.

== Seeds ==
1. (Spain) Àlex Corretja (first round)
2. (Spain) Carlos Moyá (semifinals)
3. (United Kingdom) Tim Henman (quarterfinals)
4. (United Kingdom) Greg Rusedski (second round)
5. (Slovakia) Karol Kučera (second round)
6. (Spain) Albert Costa (second round)
7. (Spain) Félix Mantilla (quarterfinals)
8. (Brazil) Gustavo Kuerten (quarterfinals)

== Draw ==
Key

- Q = Qualifier
- WC = Wild card
- LL = Lucky loser
- Alt = Alternate
- ITF = ITF entry
- PR = Protected ranking
- SR = Special ranking
- SE = Special exempt
- JE = Junior exempt
- JR = Junior Accelerator Programme entrant
- CO = College Accelerator Programme entrant
- NG = Next Gen Accelerator Program entrant
- w/o = Walkover
- r = Retired
- d = Defaulted

=== Finals ===
Semifinals
(Australia) Andrew Ilie | 3 | 6^{6}
(Germany) Nicolas Kiefer | 6 | 7^{8}
(France) Jérôme Golmard | 4 | 7 | 6
2 | (Spain) Carlos Moyá | 6 | 5 | 3

Final
(Germany) Nicolas Kiefer | 4 | 2
(France) Jérôme Golmard | 6 | 6

=== Top half ===
First round
1 | (Spain) À Corretja | 6 | 4 | 6^{10}
(Australia) A Ilie | 4 | 6 | 7^{12}
LL | (Spain) A Martín | 3 | 4
(Czech Republic) P Korda | 6 | 6
Q | (Belgium) J Van Herck | 6 | 6
WC | (India) L Paes | 4 | 3
(Costa Rica) JA Marín | 4 | 4
8 | (Brazil) G Kuerten | 6 | 6
4 | (United Kingdom) G Rusedski | 6 | 6
(Netherlands) S Schalken | 4 | 3
(Spain) F Clavet | 3 | 6 | 7^{13}
(South Africa) W Ferreira | 6 | 2 | 6^{11}
(France) N Escudé | 3 | 2
(Germany) N Kiefer | 6 | 6
(Morocco) H Arazi | 3 | 2
6 | (Spain) A Costa | 6 | 6

Second round
(Australia) A Ilie | 6 | 6
(Czech Republic) P Korda | 1 | 3
Q | (Belgium) J Van Herck | 3 | 2
8 | (Brazil) G Kuerten | 6 | 6
4 | (United Kingdom) G Rusedski | 6 | 5 | 2
(Spain) F Clavet | 3 | 7 | 6
(Germany) N Kiefer | 6 | 7^{7}
6 | (Spain) A Costa | 3 | 6^{3}

Quarterfinals
(Australia) A Ilie | 6 | 6
8 | (Brazil) G Kuerten | 4 | 4
(Spain) F Clavet | 6^{7} | 7^{8} | 2
(Germany) N Kiefer | 7^{9} | 6^{6} | 6

Semifinals
(Australia) A Ilie | 3 | 6^{6}
(Germany) N Kiefer | 6 | 7^{8}

=== Bottom half ===
First round
5 | (Slovakia) K Kučera | 6 | 6
(Spain) A Berasategui | 0 | 2
(France) F Santoro | 4 | 3
(France) J Golmard | 6 | 6
(Sweden) J Björkman | 6 | 6
WC | (Germany) B Becker | 3 | 4
Q | (Zimbabwe) W Black | 0 | 4
3 | (United Kingdom) T Henman | 6 | 6
7 | (Spain) F Mantilla | 7^{7} | 6
(Spain) F Vicente | 6^{2} | 4
(Zimbabwe) B Black | 6 | 7^{9}
(Czech Republic) B Ulihrach | 1 | 6^{7}
Q | (France) S Huet | 4 | 2
WC | (Austria) T Muster | 6 | 6
Q | (Sweden) M Norman | 6 | 3 | 4
2 | (Spain) C Moyá | 1 | 6 | 6

Second round
5 | (Slovakia) K Kučera | 6^{6} | 1
(France) J Golmard | 7^{8} | 6
(Sweden) J Björkman | 3 | 6^{7}
3 | (United Kingdom) T Henman | 6 | 7^{9}
7 | (Spain) F Mantilla | 7^{7} | 6
(Zimbabwe) B Black | 6^{1} | 3
WC | (Austria) T Muster | 4 | 4
2 | (Spain) C Moyá | 6 | 6

Quarterfinals
(France) J Golmard | 7^{7} | 7
3 | (United Kingdom) T Henman | 6^{4} | 5
7 | (Spain) F Mantilla | 6^{4} | 2
2 | (Spain) C Moyá | 7^{7} | 6

Semifinals
(France) J Golmard | 4 | 7 | 6
2 | (Spain) C Moyá | 6 | 5 | 3
