= Nicolás Massú =

Chilean tennis player and coach (born 1979)

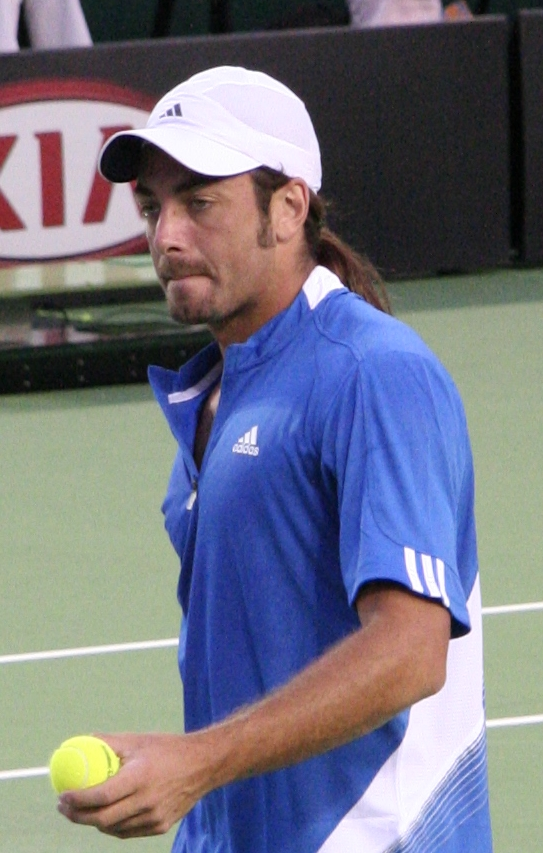
- Massú at the Australian Open in 2007
- Country (sports): Chile
- Residence: Viña del Mar, Chile
- Born: 10 October 1979 (age 47) Viña del Mar, Chile
- Height: 1.83 m (6 ft 0 in)
- Turned pro: 1997
- Retired: 27 September 2013 (one match in 2019)
- Plays: Right-handed (two-handed backhand)
- Prize money: $4,344,833

Singles
- Career record: 257–238 (ATP Tour and Grand Slam level, and in Davis Cup)
- Career titles: 6
- Highest ranking: No. 9 (13 September 2004)

Grand Slam singles results
- Australian Open: 2R (2005)
- French Open: 3R (2004, 2006)
- Wimbledon: 3R (2001)
- US Open: 4R (2005)

Other tournaments
- Olympic Games: W (2004)

Doubles
- Career record: 82–103 (ATP Tour and Grand Slam level, and in Davis Cup)
- Career titles: 1
- Highest ranking: No. 31 (25 July 2005)

Grand Slam doubles results
- Australian Open: 2R (2008)
- French Open: SF (2005)
- Wimbledon: 2R (2005)
- US Open: QF (2004)

Other doubles tournaments
- Olympic Games: W (2004)

Team competitions
- Davis Cup: QF (2006, 2010)
Medal record
Men's tennis
Representing Chile
Olympic Games
Gold medal – first place	2004 Athens	Singles
Gold medal – first place	2004 Athens	Doubles

Nicolás Alejandro Massú Fried (Spanish pronunciation: [nikoˈlas maˈsu]; born 10 October 1979), nicknamed El Vampiro (Spanish, 'the vampire'), is a Chilean tennis coach and a former professional player. A former world No. 9 in singles, he won the singles and doubles gold medals at the 2004 Athens Olympics. He is the only man to have won both gold medals at the same Games since the re-introduction of Olympic tennis in 1988, and they were the first two Chile's Olympic gold medals. Massú also reached the final of the 2003 Madrid Masters and won six singles titles. He was the coach of 2020 US Open champion and former world No. 3 Dominic Thiem from 2019 to 2023.

== Family ==
Massú is Jewish, as is his mother, Sonia Fried. His father, Manuel Massú, is of Lebanese and Palestinian ancestry. His mother is of Israeli and Hungarian-Jewish descent. His maternal grandfather, Ladislao Fried Klein, was a Hungarian-born Jew who survived the Nazi occupation of Hungary by hiding, as his parents did not survive. His maternal grandmother, Veronika (née Vegvari), was a Holocaust survivor who was imprisoned in the Auschwitz concentration camp.

== Tennis career ==
=== Early years ===
Massú was introduced to tennis by his grandfather at age five. From age 12, he was trained at the Valle Dorado tennis academy, near Villa Alemana, by Leonardo Zuleta, with whom he perfected his forehand and double-handed backhand. He later trained at the Nick Bollettieri Academy, in Florida, alongside Marcelo Ríos, and later at the High Performance Center in Barcelona, Spain.

=== Juniors ===
Massú became a professional tennis player in 1997. That year, he won the prestigious juniors year-end Orange Bowl tournament and was doubles world champion, as well as No. 5 in singles. He also claimed the boys' doubles competitions at both Wimbledon and the US Open, partnering Peru's Luis Horna at the former and countryman Fernando González at the latter.

=== ATP Tour ===
In August 1998, Massú won his first Futures tournament, in Spain. The following month, he claimed his first Challenger event, in Ecuador. He won his second Challenger tournament in June 1999, in Italy. In September 1999, he successfully defended his title in Ecuador. In November 1999, he won the Santiago Challenger event and cracked the top 100 in singles for the first time.

In May 2000, Massú reached his first ATP tournament final, at the U.S. Clay Court Championships in Orlando, Florida, where he lost to Fernando González. Later in August, he lost again to another Chilean—Marcelo Ríos—in his US Open debut. In January 2001, Massú reached his second ATP event final, in Adelaide, Australia.

Massú's first ATP title came in February 2002 in Buenos Aires, where he defeated Argentine Agustín Calleri in a three-set final, after being down match point. At the 2003 event, Calleri took revenge and defeated him in the first round, a loss that pushed Massú out of the top 100 in singles and forced him to play Challengers once again. In April 2003, he reached the Bermuda Challenger final.

Massú claimed his second ATP title in July 2003 in Amersfoort, Netherlands. The following week, he reached the final of the Kitzbühel tournament, cracking the top 50 in singles for the first time. In September, he made three consecutive tournament finals, including a win at a Challenger event and his third ATP title in Palermo. In October, he reached the final at the Madrid Masters Series tournament, losing to Juan Carlos Ferrero in the final. He ended the year at world No. 12.

In mid-2004, Massú parted ways with Argentine coach Gabriel Markus, whom he replaced with Chilean Patricio Rodríguez. In July 2004, Massú won his fourth ATP title in Kitzbühel and then went on to win two gold medals at the 2004 Olympics (see below). Thanks to his outstanding performance at the Olympics, he reached his career-high ATP singles ranking of world No. 9. In November, he underwent groin surgery and therefore entered the 2005 season off top form. He ended an unremarkable 2005 with a six-match losing streak, although ironically 2005 also saw his best performance at a Grand Slam tournament as he reached the fourth round of the US Open, losing to Guillermo Coria.

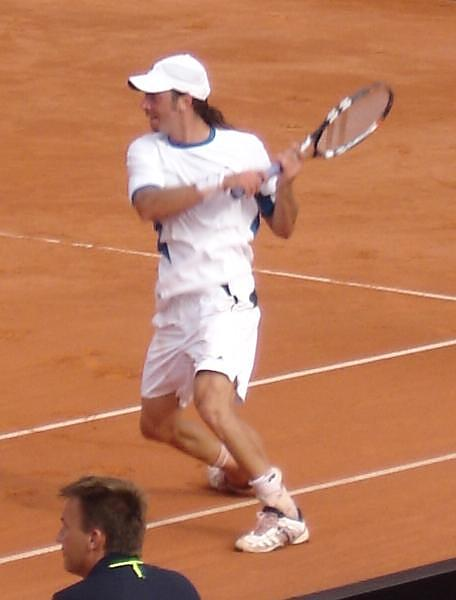
Massú at the 2005 Austrian Open in Kitzbühel

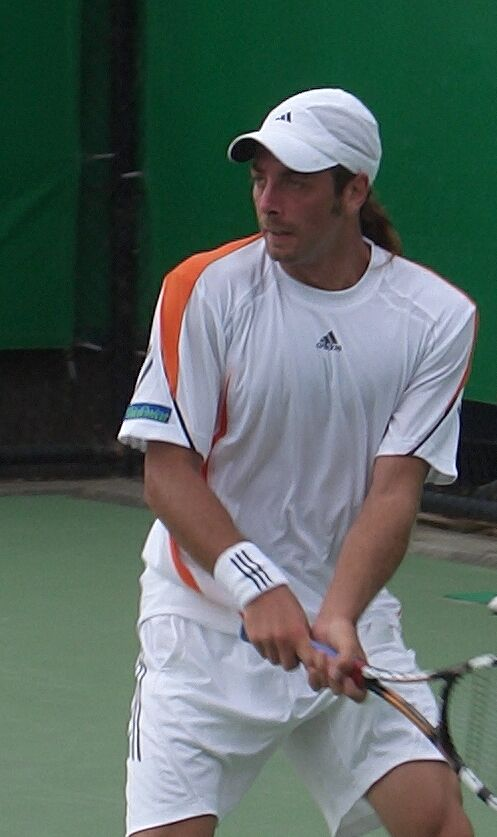
Massú at the 2006 Australian Open

He was the first player to be beaten by Stan Wawrinka in the main draw of a Grand Slam tournament, at the 2005 French Open.

In January 2006, Massú lost to José Acasuso in the final of his hometown event at Viña del Mar. In February, he won his sixth ATP title in Costa do Sauipe, Brazil. In April, he reached the final of the Casablanca event in Morocco. In July, he lost to Novak Djokovic in the final of the Amersfoort tournament.

In January 2007, Massú repeated his Viña del Mar showing of 2006, losing to Luis Horna in straight sets. In July, he began an eight-match losing streak that ended in October in Saint Petersburg.

Massú had an early exit at the Viña del Mar tournament in January 2008, losing to Sergio Roitman in the first round. Because he was defending points from a final showing in 2007, the following week he fell to No. 97 in the world. In July, his singles ranking plummeted to No. 138, his worst since November 1999. Later in the year, he won the Florianópolis II Challenger event and was a finalist in two other tournaments at that level.

Massú began 2009 by not winning a match during his first five tournaments and losing his opening Davis Cup singles match against Croatia in March. He broke his losing streak at the Indian Wells Masters, beating Argentine Eduardo Schwank in three sets in the first round.

=== Olympics ===
Massú has represented Chile at three Summer Olympics: 2000 Sydney, 2004 Athens and 2008 Beijing. At the 2000 event's opening ceremony, he was his country's stand in flag bearer after Marcelo Ríos failed to show up. In his first-round match he beat Sláva Doseděl, but lost to Juan Carlos Ferrero in the next round.

The story was different in Athens, where Massú captured both singles and doubles titles. On August 21, he and Fernando González defeated Nicolas Kiefer and Rainer Schüttler of Germany to win the doubles competition, making history by giving Chile its first ever Olympic gold medal in any sport, after nearly a full century of Olympic participation. Massú and González came from four straight match points in the fourth set tie-break to claim the gold. The following day, he captured his second gold medal by defeating American Mardy Fish in five sets in the men's singles final. Following his victory in singles, he was declared as Athlete of the Day by the 2004 Athens Olympics' organization.

"I was so happy because this is my best memory in my sport career. If I look back in 10 more years, I look back on this, I'm gonna be so happy. Now I can die happy."

Because of his low ranking, Massú was granted a wild card to compete in both singles and doubles events in Beijing. He only managed to reach the second round in singles and was ousted on his first match in doubles, where he partnered again with Fernando González. To this day, Massú is the only male player in the Open Era to have won gold medals in both singles and doubles at the same Olympic Games.

=== Davis Cup ===
Massú began playing for Chile in Davis Cup matches in 1996. He played in the World Group, representing Chile in the years from 2005 to 2007 and again from 2009 to 2011. He ended his participation with a record of 29–17, including 17–4 on clay.

In 2014, Massú took the position of captain of the Chile Davis Cup team, with former No. 1 Marcelo Ríos as coach. After five years since the start of his tenure as captain, the team achieved a comeback to the elite group of the competition and qualified for the 2019 Davis Cup Finals, eight years after its last participation.

=== Maccabiah Games ===
Massú is a veteran of the 2001 Maccabiah Games in Israel, the international Jewish Olympics.

== Coaching career ==
Massú was the coach of Dominic Thiem, 2020 US Open Men's Singles Champion and winner of the 2019 Indian Wells Masters 1000 tournament. Massú played one doubles tournament in 2019, partnering Dominic's brother, Moritz Thiem.

He coached Hubert Hurkacz from November 2024 until April 2026. Since June 2026, he is coaching Francisco Cerúndolo.

== Playing style ==
Massú was known for his fighting spirit, especially when playing for Chile, which he demonstrated at the 2004 Olympics and in numerous Davis Cup matches. He has also turned around difficult matches and had a style characteristic of a clay-court specialist, with strong baseline play characterized by a solid forehand and backhand.

== Significant finals ==
=== Olympic finals ===
==== Singles: 1 (1–0) ====
Outcome	Year	Championship	Surface	Opponent	Score
Gold	2004	Athens Olympics	Hard	(United States) Mardy Fish	6–3, 3–6, 2–6, 6–3, 6–4

==== Doubles: 1 (1–0) ====
Outcome	Year	Championship	Surface	Partner	Opponents	Score
Gold	2004	Athens Olympics	Hard	(Chile) Fernando González	(Germany) Nicolas Kiefer (Germany) Rainer Schüttler	6–2, 4–6, 3–6, 7–6^{(9–7)}, 6–4

=== Masters Series finals ===
==== Singles: 1 (0–1) ====
Outcome	Year	Championship	Surface	Opponent	Score
Runner-up	2003	Madrid	Hard (i)	(Spain) Juan Carlos Ferrero	3–6, 4–6, 3–6

== ATP career finals ==
=== Singles: 15 (6 titles, 9 runner-ups) ===
Legend Grand Slam (0–0) Olympic Gold (1–0) ATP Masters Series (0–1) ATP International Series Gold (1–1) ATP Tour (4–7)	Finals by surface Hard (1–2) Clay (5–7) Grass (0–0) Carpet (0–0)

Result	W/L	Date	Tournament	Surface	Opponent	Score
Loss	0–1	May 2000	Orlando, United States	Clay	(Chile) Fernando González	2–6, 3–6
Loss	0–2	Jan 2001	Adelaide, Australia	Hard	(Germany) Tommy Haas	3–6, 1–6
Win	1–2	Feb 2002	Buenos Aires, Argentina	Clay	(Argentina) Agustín Calleri	2–6, 7–6^{(7–5)}, 6–2
Win	2–2	Jul 2003	Amersfoort, Netherlands	Clay	(Netherlands) Raemon Sluiter	6–4, 7–6^{(7–3)}, 6–2
Loss	2–3	Jul 2003	Kitzbühel, Austria	Clay	(Argentina) Guillermo Coria	1–6, 4–6, 2–6
Loss	2–4	Sep 2003	Bucharest, Romania	Clay	(Spain) David Sánchez	2–6, 2–6
Win	3–4	Sep 2003	Palermo, Italy	Clay	(France) Paul-Henri Mathieu	1–6, 6–2, 7–6^{(7–0)}
Loss	3–5	Oct 2003	Madrid, Spain	Hard (i)	(Spain) Juan Carlos Ferrero	3–6, 4–6, 3–6
Win	4–5	Jul 2004	Kitzbühel, Austria	Clay	(Argentina) Gastón Gaudio	7–6^{(7–3)}, 6–4
Win	5–5	Aug 2004	Athens Olympics	Hard	(United States) Mardy Fish	6–3, 3–6, 2–6, 6–3, 6–4
Loss	5–6	Feb 2006	Viña del Mar, Chile	Clay	(Argentina) José Acasuso	4–6, 3–6
Win	6–6	Feb 2006	Costa do Sauípe, Brazil	Clay	(Spain) Alberto Martín	6–3, 6–4
Loss	6–7	Apr 2006	Casablanca, Morocco	Clay	(Italy) Daniele Bracciali	1–6, 4–6
Loss	6–8	Jul 2006	Amersfoort, Netherlands	Clay	(Serbia) Novak Djokovic	6–7^{(5–7)}, 4–6
Loss	6–9	Feb 2007	Viña del Mar, Chile	Clay	(Peru) Luis Horna	5–7, 3–6

=== Doubles: 3 (1 title, 2 runner-ups) ===
Legend Grand Slam (0–0) Olympic Gold (1–0) ATP Masters Series (0–0) ATP International Series Gold (0–1) ATP Tour (0–1)	Finals by surface Hard (1–0) Clay (0–2) Grass (0–0) Carpet (0–0)

Result	No.	Date	Championship	Surface	Partner	Opponents	Score
Loss	1.	Mar 2004	Acapulco, Mexico	Clay	(Argentina) Juan Ignacio Chela	(United States) Bob Bryan (United States) Mike Bryan	2–6, 3–6
Win	1.	Aug 2004	Athens Olympics	Hard	(Chile) Fernando González	(Germany) Nicolas Kiefer (Germany) Rainer Schüttler	6–2, 4–6, 3–6, 7–6^{(9–7)}, 6–4
Loss	2.	Jul 2005	Amersfoort, Netherlands	Clay	(Chile) Fernando González	(Argentina) Martín García (Peru) Luis Horna	4–6, 4–6

== ATP Challengers & ITF Futures finals ==
=== Singles: 18 (10–8) ===
Legend
ATP Challengers (8–5)
ITF Futures (2–3)

Outcome	No.	Date	Tournament	Surface	Opponent	Score
Runner-up	1.	May 24, 1998	Vero Beach, Florida, USA	Clay	(Haiti) Ronald Agénor	3–6, 6–3, 3–6
Runner-up	2.	May 31, 1998	Boca Raton, USA	Clay	(Haiti) Ronald Agénor	1–6, 2–6
Runner-up	3.	June 21, 1998	Lafayette, USA	Hard	(United States) Cecil Mamiit	6–0, 3–6, 0–6
Winner	1.	August 23, 1998	Vigo, Spain	Clay	(Spain) Tommy Robredo	6–4, 6–2
Winner	2.	August 30, 1998	Irun, Spain	Clay	(France) Maxime Boyé	6–4, 3–6, 6–3
Winner	3.	September 7, 1998	Quito, Ecuador	Clay	(Mexico) Mariano Sánchez	3–6, 6–3, 6–0
Winner	4.	June 21, 1999	Biella, Italy	Clay	(Uzbekistan) Oleg Ogorodov	7–6^{(7–5)}, 5–7, 6–3
Winner	5.	September 6, 1999	Quito, Ecuador	Clay	(Ecuador) Luis Morejón	6–2, 3–6, 6–3
Winner	6.	November 1, 1999	Santiago, Chile	Clay	(Morocco) Karim Alami	6–7^{(4–7}), 6–2, 6–4
Runner-up	4.	November 28, 1999	Guadalajara, Mexico	Clay	(Brazil) Francisco Costa	6–4, 5–7, 3–6
Winner	7.	September 15, 2003	Szczecin, Poland	Clay	(Spain) Albert Portas	6–4, 6–3
Runner-up	5.	April 14, 2003	Paget, Bermuda	Clay	(Brazil) Flávio Saretta	1–6, 4–6
Winner	8.	May 5, 2008	Rijeka, Croatia	Clay	(Belgium) Christophe Rochus	6–2, 6–2
Runner-up	6.	August 3, 2008	Belo Horizonte, Brazil	Hard	(Mexico) Santiago González	4–6, 3–6
Winner	9.	October 6, 2008	Florianópolis, Brazil	Clay	(France) Olivier Patience	6–7^{(4–7)}, 6–2, 6–1
Runner-up	8.	October 13, 2008	Montevideo, Uruguay	Clay	(Australia) Peter Luczak	w/o
Runner-up	8.	October 23, 2009	Santiago, Chile	Clay	(Argentina) Eduardo Schwank	2–6, 2–6
Winner	10.	November 22, 2009	Cancún, Mexico	Clay	(Slovenia) Grega Zemlja	6–3, 7–5

== Team titles ==
Outcome	No.	Date	Tournament	Surface	Partners	Opponents	Score
Winner	1.	24 May 2003	World Team Cup, Düsseldorf	Clay	(Chile) Fernando González (Chile) Marcelo Ríos	(Czech Republic) Jiří Novák (Czech Republic) Radek Štěpánek	2–1
Winner	2.	22 May 2004	World Team Cup, Düsseldorf	Clay	(Chile) Adrián García (Chile) Fernando González	(Australia) Wayne Arthurs (Australia) Paul Hanley (Australia) Lleyton Hewitt (Australia) Mark Philippoussis	2–1

== Performance timelines ==
Key
W	F	SF	QF	#R	RR	Q#	P#	DNQ	A	Z#	PO	G	S	B	NMS	NTI	P	NH

(W) winner; (F) finalist; (SF) semifinalist; (QF) quarterfinalist; (#R) rounds 4, 3, 2, 1; (RR) round-robin stage; (Q#) qualification round; (P#) preliminary round; (DNQ) did not qualify; (A) absent; (Z#) Davis/Fed Cup Zonal Group (with number indication) or (PO) play-off; (G) gold, (S) silver or (B) bronze Olympic/Paralympic medal; (NMS) not a Masters tournament; (NTI) not a Tier I tournament; (P) postponed; (NH) not held; (SR) strike rate (events won / competed); (W–L) win–loss record.

=== Singles ===
Tournament	1996	1997	1998	1999	2000	2001	2002	2003	2004	2005	2006	2007	2008	2009	2010	2011	2012	2013	SR	W–L
Grand Slam tournaments
Australian Open	A	A	A	A	A	1R	1R	A	1R	2R	1R	1R	1R	1R	A	Q3	A	A	0 / 8	1–8
French Open	A	A	A	Q1	2R	1R	A	2R	3R	1R	3R	2R	Q2	2R	1R	A	A	A	0 / 9	8–9
Wimbledon	A	A	A	A	1R	3R	1R	2R	1R	2R	1R	1R	A	A	1R	A	A	A	0 / 9	4–9
US Open	A	A	A	Q1	1R	2R	3R	3R	2R	4R	2R	1R	Q2	1R	A	A	A	A	0 / 9	9–9
Win–loss	0–0	0–0	0–0	0–0	1–3	3–4	2–3	4–3	3–4	4–4	3–4	1–4	0–1	1–3	0–2	0–0	0–0	0–0	0 / 35	22–35
National representation
Summer Olympics	A	Not Held			2R	Not Held			G	Not Held			2R	Not Held			A	NH	1 / 3	8–2
Davis Cup	Z1	1R	Z1	1R	PO	1R	Z1	A	PO	1R	QF	1R	PO	1R	QF	1R	A	A	0 / 9	22–12
ATP Masters Series
Indian Wells	A	A	Q1	A	Q1	2R	A	Q2	2R	A	2R	1R	2R	2R	A	A	A	A	0 / 6	4–6
Miami	A	A	A	A	2R	1R	A	3R	2R	A	3R	1R	Q1	3R	1R	Q2	A	A	0 / 8	7–8
Monte Carlo	A	A	A	A	A	Q1	2R	A	3R	A	1R	2R	A	Q1	A	A	A	A	0 / 4	4–4
Rome	A	A	A	A	A	A	A	1R	QF	2R	1R	3R	A	Q2	A	A	A	A	0 / 5	6–5
Hamburg^{1}	A	A	A	A	A	A	A	Q1	1R	2R	1R	1R	A	Q1	A	A	A	A	0 / 4	1–4
Canada	A	A	A	A	A	A	A	1R	1R	1R	1R	A	A	A	A	A	A	A	0 / 4	0–4
Cincinnati	A	A	A	A	A	A	A	Q2	1R	1R	1R	A	A	A	A	A	A	A	0 / 3	0–3
Madrid^{2}	A	A	A	A	A	1R	A	F	2R	1R	2R	Q2	A	A	A	A	A	A	0 / 5	6–5
Paris	A	A	A	A	Q1	Q1	A	3R	3R	1R	1R	Q2	A	A	A	A	A	A	0 / 4	2–4
Win–loss	0–0	0–0	0–0	0–0	1–1	1–3	1–1	8–5	6–9	2–6	4–9	3–5	1–1	3–2	0–1	0–0	0–0	0–0	0 / 43	30–43
Career statistics
Titles	0	0	0	0	0	0	1	2	2	0	1	0	0	0	0	0	0	0	6	
Finals	0	0	0	0	1	1	1	5	2	0	4	1	0	0	0	0	0	0	15	
Overall win–loss	0–1	0–1	2–2	4–2	26–25	23–28	29–19	36–20	42–28	18–22	38–27	17–26	9–12	9–12	4–8	0–3	0–1	0–1	257–238	
Year-end ranking	882	583	188	97	87	80	56	12	19	66	44	79	76	112	186	450	618	876	51.92%	

=== Doubles ===
Tournament	1996	1997	1998	1999	2000	2001	2002	2003	2004	2005	2006	2007	2008	2009	2010	2011	2012	2013	2019	SR	W–L
Grand Slam tournaments
Australian Open	A	A	A	A	A	A	A	A	1R	A	A	A	2R	A	A	A	A	A	A	0 / 2	1–2
French Open	A	A	A	A	A	A	A	A	A	SF	A	1R	A	A	A	A	A	A	A	0 / 2	4–2
Wimbledon	A	A	A	A	A	A	A	A	1R	2R	A	A	A	A	A	A	A	A	A	0 / 2	1–2
US Open	A	A	A	A	A	A	A	1R	QF	3R	2R	2R	A	A	A	A	A	A	A	0 / 5	7–5
Win–loss	0–0	0–0	0–0	0–0	0–0	0–0	0–0	0–1	3–3	7–3	1–1	1–2	1–1	0–0	0–0	0–0	0–0	0–0	0–0	0 / 11	13–11
National representation
Summer Olympics		Not Held			1R	Not Held			G	Not Held			1R	Not Held			A	NH	NH	1 / 3	5–2
Davis Cup	Z1	1R	Z1	1R	PO	1R	Z1	A	PO	1R	QF	1R	PO	1R	QF	1R	A	A	A	0 / 9	10–12
ATP Masters Series
Indian Wells	A	A	A	A	A	A	A	A	A	A	1R	A	A	A	A	A	A	A	A	0 / 1	0–1
Miami	A	A	A	A	A	A	A	A	1R	A	1R	A	A	A	A	A	A	A	A	0 / 2	0–2
Monte Carlo	A	A	A	A	A	A	A	A	QF	A	1R	A	A	A	A	A	A	A	A	0 / 2	2–2
Rome	A	A	A	A	A	A	A	A	1R	1R	SF	A	A	A	A	A	A	A	A	0 / 3	3–3
Hamburg^{1}	A	A	A	A	A	A	A	A	1R	2R	1R	A	A	A	A	A	A	A	A	0 / 3	2–2
Canada	A	A	A	A	A	A	A	A	2R	1R	A	A	A	A	A	A	A	A	A	0 / 2	1–2
Cincinnati	A	A	A	A	A	A	A	A	QF	1R	A	A	A	A	A	A	A	A	A	0 / 2	2–2
Madrid^{2}	A	A	A	A	A	A	A	A	1R	A	A	A	A	A	A	A	A	A	A	0 / 1	0–1
Paris	A	A	A	A	A	A	A	1R	QF	A	A	A	A	A	A	A	A	A	A	0 / 2	1–1
Win–loss	0–0	0–0	0–0	0–0	0–0	0–0	0–0	0–1	7–6	1–4	3–5	0–0	0–0	0–0	0–0	0–0	0–0	0–0	0–0	0 / 18	11–16
Career statistics
Titles	0	0	0	0	0	0	0	0	1	0	0	0	0	0	0	0	0	0	0	1	
Finals	0	0	0	0	0	0	0	0	2	1	0	0	0	0	0	0	0	0	0	3	
Overall win–loss	0–0	1–2	3–2	2–0	5–8	0–3	1–5	5–6	30–21	13–15	8–12	6–11	5–6	0–3	2–4	1–2	0–1	0–1	0–1	82–103	
Year-end ranking	–	470	319	356	243	1263	389	291	36	58	139	257	221	490	342	376	–	937		44.32%	

^{1}Held as Hamburg Masters until 2008 and Madrid Masters from 2009 to 2013.
^{2}Held as Stuttgart Masters until 2001, Madrid Masters from 2002 to 2008 and Shanghai Masters from 2009 to 2013.

== Top 10 wins ==
Season	1997	1998	1999	2000	2001	2002	2003	2004	2005	2006	2007	2008	2009	2010	2011	2012	2013	Total
Wins	0	0	0	0	1	0	1	3	1	1	1	0	0	0	0	0	0	8

#	Player	Rank	Event	Surface	Rd	Score	Massú Rank
2001
1.	(United Kingdom) Tim Henman	10	Adelaide, Australia	Hard	SF	3–6, 7–5, 6–2	87
2003
2.	(United States) Andy Roddick	2	Madrid, Spain	Hard (i)	3R	7–6^{(7–3)}, 6–2	21
2004
3.	(Germany) Rainer Schüttler	7	World Team Cup, Düsseldorf	Clay	RR	6–4, 4–6, 6–2	11
4.	(Germany) Rainer Schüttler	8	Kitzbühel, Austria	Clay	SF	6–3, 6–3	13
5.	(Spain) Carlos Moyá	4	Summer Olympics, Athens	Hard	QF	6–2, 7–5	14
2005
6.	(United States) Andy Roddick	3	Hamburg, Germany	Clay	1R	7–6^{(7–4)}, 4–6, 7–5	25
2006
7.	(United States) Andy Roddick	5	World Team Cup, Düsseldorf	Clay	RR	4–2 ret.	35
2007
8.	(United States) James Blake	9	Rome, Italy	Clay	2R	7–6^{(7–3)}, 7–5	59

== See also ==
- List of select Jewish tennis players

Sporting positions
Preceded by (Russia) Yevgeny Kafelnikov	Olympic Tennis Champion; 2004	Succeeded by (Spain) Rafael Nadal
Olympic Games
Preceded by Duncan Grob	Flagbearer for Chile; 2000 Sydney	Succeeded by Anita Irarrázabal
