= Nicolas Kiefer =

German tennis player (born 1977)

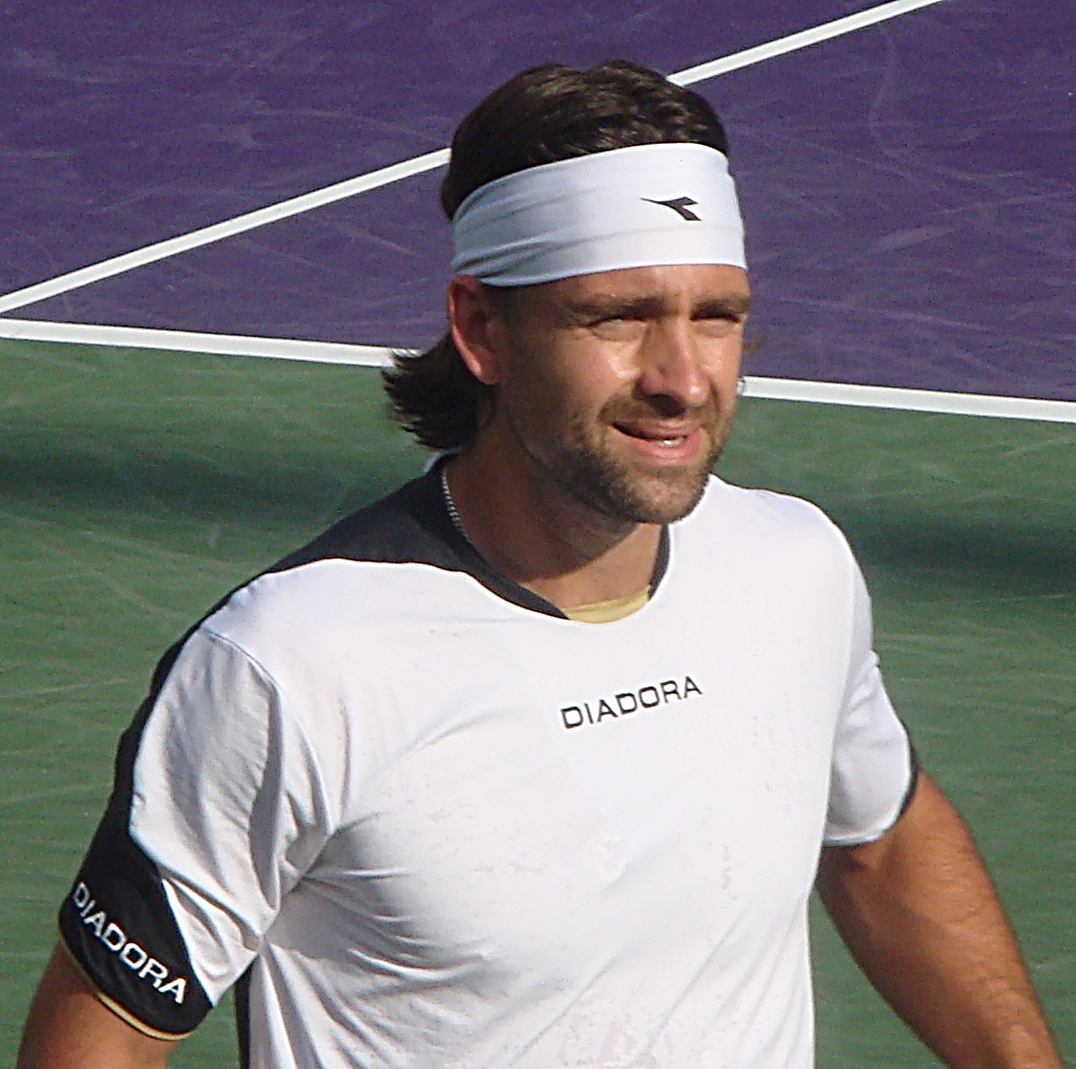
- Kiefer at the 2008 Sony Ericsson Open
- Country (sports): Germany
- Residence: Sievershausen, Germany
- Born: 5 July 1977 (age 49) Holzminden, West Germany
- Height: 1.83 m (6 ft 0 in)
- Turned pro: 1995
- Retired: 30 December 2010
- Plays: Right-handed (two-handed backhand)
- Prize money: US$ 7,480,465

Singles
- Career record: 366–274 (57.2%)
- Career titles: 6
- Highest ranking: No. 4 (10 January 2000)

Grand Slam singles results
- Australian Open: SF (2006)
- French Open: 4R (2005)
- Wimbledon: QF (1997)
- US Open: QF (2000)

Other tournaments
- Tour Finals: SF (1999)
- Olympic Games: 3R (2004, 2008)

Doubles
- Career record: 92–123
- Career titles: 3
- Highest ranking: No. 56 (17 February 2003)

Grand Slam doubles results
- Australian Open: 2R (2004)
- French Open: 1R (2001, 2003, 2004)
- Wimbledon: 2R (2003)
- US Open: 1R (2002)
Medal record
Olympic Games
Silver medal – second place	2004 Athens	Doubles

Nicolas Kiefer (German pronunciation: [ˈnɪkolas ˈkiːfɐ]; born 5 July 1977) is a German former professional tennis player. He reached the semifinals of the 2006 Australian Open and won a silver medal in men's doubles with partner Rainer Schüttler at the 2004 Athens Olympics. Kiefer's career-high singles ranking was world No. 4, achieved in January 2000.

== Tennis career ==
=== 1995–2005 ===
Kiefer was taken notice of as an outstanding junior. He won the Junior Australian Open, the US Open, and was a finalist and semifinalist at Wimbledon and the French Open finishing as the No. 2 junior behind Mariano Zabaleta when he was 18 in 1995. On 10 January 2000, he reached his second quarterfinal at the Australian Open and afterwards was ranked world No. 4, his highest position.

Kiefer was known to have some tennis superstitions. He was sometimes seen tapping his racquet on the corners of the court after a point, and, when serving, frequently asked for the ball with which he had just won a point to re-use it for the next one.

=== 2006–2007 ===
Kiefer became infamous for an incident on 25 January 2006, during the quarterfinals of the Australian Open. While facing Sébastien Grosjean late in the fifth set of a marathon match, Kiefer threw his racquet midpoint. Grosjean lost the point, hitting the ball into the net. Grosjean protested that the racquet distracted his shot. The umpire Carlos Bernardes said he did not believe the act was intentional and noted Grosjean had already hit the ball before the flying racquet could have had any effect on his shot. Grosjean eventually lost the fifth and final set to Kiefer. Kiefer went through to the semi-finals where he was defeated by the 2004 champion Roger Federer.

Kiefer injured his wrist while playing at the 2006 French Open, and announced his return on 5 July 2007, having fallen to the 404th position on ATP. He announced that he was "tired of waiting and anxious to start traveling again and to see his name on scoreboards". Kiefer returned at the 2007 Gerry Weber Open, losing in the first round to eventual champion Tomáš Berdych. At Wimbledon, he made the third round after defeating No.30 seed Filippo Volandri and Fabrice Santoro, both in straight sets, before losing in 4 sets (3 of which were tiebreakers) to Novak Djokovic. At Newport, however, he ended up losing in round 1. At Los Angeles, he reached the semifinals in only his 4th tournament since coming back from injury; he had to default against Radek Štěpánek, another player coming back from injury, because of an injury sustained during his quarter-final win. He also made an impressive showing at the 2007 Madrid Masters, where he beat number five seed Fernando González in the quarterfinals before losing in the semifinals to world number one Roger Federer 6–4, 6–4.

=== 2008 ===
His 2008 season did not start out well: he lost in the first round of the Australian Open to former world No.1 Juan Carlos Ferrero, first round of 2008 Indian Wells Masters to Dudi Sela, third round of 2008 Miami Masters to world No.2 Rafael Nadal, second round of 2008 Monte Carlo Masters to Philipp Kohlschreiber, first round of 2008 Rome Masters to Ferrero. His first notable result was the quarterfinals of the 2008 Hamburg Masters with victories over world No.10 Stanislas Wawrinka and world No.4 Nikolay Davydenko before losing to Andreas Seppi in three sets. He would lose in the third round of 2008 Wimbledon Championships to Nadal. During the 2008 Canada Masters, at age 31 and ranked No. 37, he made his first Masters final after 73 previous tries, previously finishing as a semifinalist at the 1999 and 2004 Canada Masters (lost to Thomas Johansson and Andy Roddick respectively) and 2007 Madrid Masters (lost to Federer). Along the way, he defeated Mardy Fish, 15th seed Mikhail Youzhny, fourth seed Nikolay Davydenko, seventh seed James Blake, and Gilles Simon; the win over Simon was especially notable because Simon had defeated world No. 1 Roger Federer in the second round. He lost to Nadal in the final in straight sets. Because of his run, he broke back into the top 20 at No. 19.

=== 2009 ===
In 2009, he represented Germany in the 2009 Hopman Cup with 19-year-old Sabine Lisicki. In the first match, he lost against Australia's Lleyton Hewitt, who had been six months inactive due to an injury. In the second singles match, Kiefer lost again, this time to USA's James Blake. Nevertheless, Kiefer won both of the doubles matches with Sabine Lisicki against both Australia and the United States. In the third singles match, Kiefer twisted his ankle against Slovakia's Dominik Hrbatý in the first set when Kiefer was up 3–1 and serving. This injury prevented him from participating in the 2009 Australian Open.

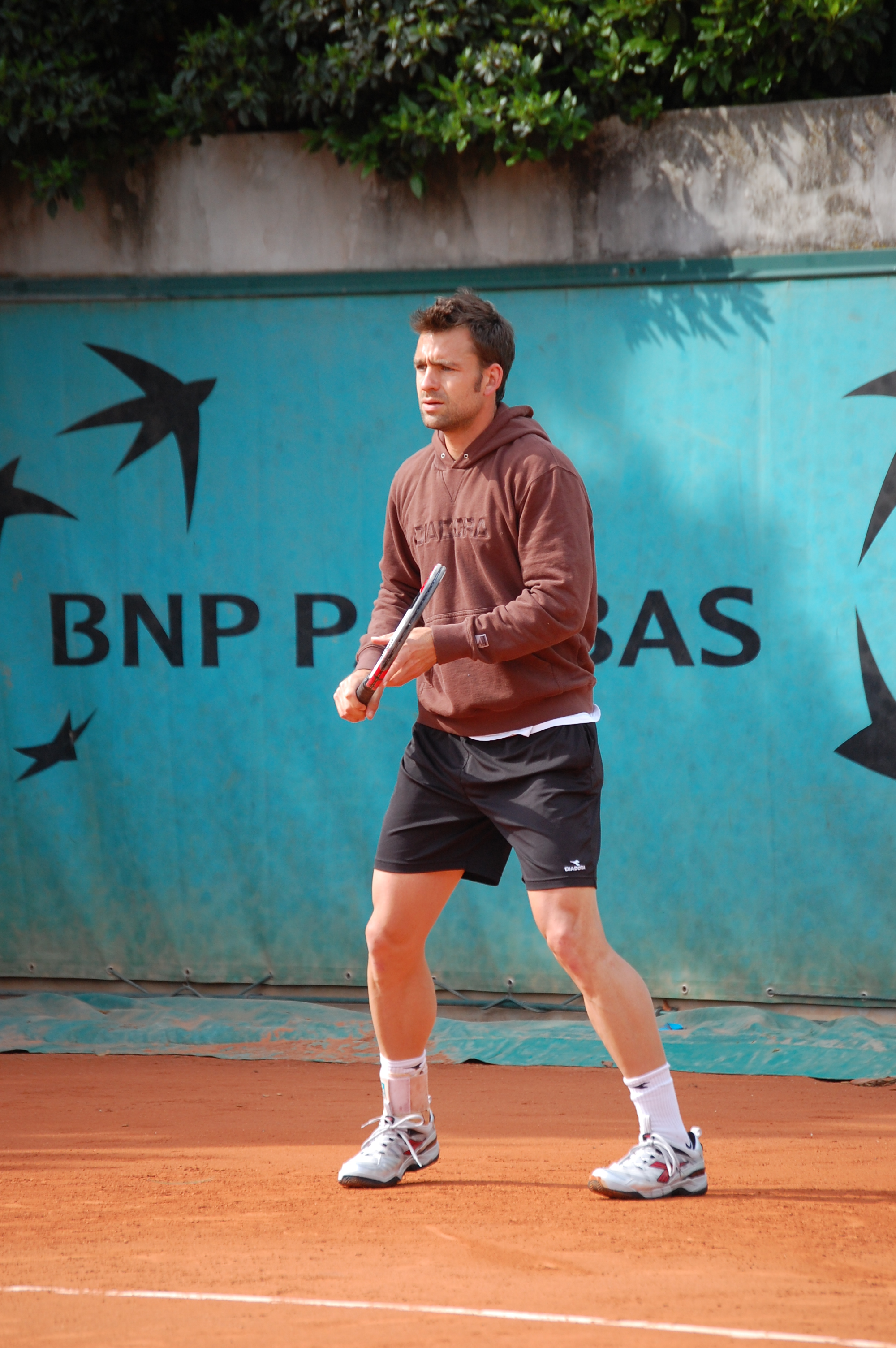
Kiefer at the 2009 French Open

He re-appeared in the 2009 Davis Cup match against Austria in which he won in the doubles match with Philipp Kohlschreiber against Julian Knowle and Alexander Peya in four sets. Kiefer also played a singles match, the fourth match, against Jürgen Melzer in which Kiefer won in straight sets and gave Germany the victory against Austria. Kiefer then participated in the 2009 BNP Paribas Open at Indian Wells in which he beat Bobby Reynolds in straight sets in the second round, but he then lost in the third round to Andy Roddick.

In the 2009 Sony Ericsson Open in Miami, Kiefer beat "the magician" Fabrice Santoro in the second round. In the third round Kiefer was defeated by world No. 2 Roger Federer. At the 2009 Monte-Carlo Rolex Masters, Kiefer lost in his first match against qualifier Andreas Beck. At the 2009 Internazionali BNL d'Italia in Rome, Kiefer lost again in his first match against Juan Mónaco in straight sets. In the 2009 BMW Open Kiefer was down against Ernests Gulbis 2–6, 0–2 but eventually won in three sets. Kiefer said after the match, "Clay and me, we will never be the best of friends". Kiefer suffered from back problems which eventually made him lose against Jérémy Chardy in the next round.

At the 2009 Mutua Madrileña Madrid Open he lost against Tommy Robredo. Kiefer then played the 2009 ARAG World Team Cup, in which he played the doubles matches with Mischa Zverev. They won all of their matches, and Germany reached the final, but lost against Serbia. Despite Germany losing, Kiefer won the doubles match in the final against Viktor Troicki and doubles world No. 1 Nenad Zimonjić.

Kiefer then participated at the 2009 French Open in which he beat qualifier Ilija Bozoljac in four sets. However, Kiefer lost in the second round against world No. 14 David Ferrer in five sets. Despite this loss, Kiefer claimed that he was proud that he had played up to a fifth set against one of the best tennis players of the world on clay, since clay is Kiefer's least favourite surface. The clay season had now ended, and the grass season started with Kiefer's participation in his favourite tournament, the 2009 Gerry Weber Open. In the first match, he thrashed Viktor Troicki, but retired in the second round against Jürgen Melzer when he was down 1–6 with a muscular strain in his abdomen which forced him to retire from singles and doubles, where he had reached the semifinals with Mischa Zverev.

Kiefer participated in the Wimbledon as the 33rd seed but having not fully recovered from his abdomen injury. This was reflected in his match against Fabrice Santoro, where Kiefer lost in straight sets. Kiefer then played for Germany in the 2009 Davis Cup quarterfinals against Spain. He did so in the doubles match with Mischa Zverev against Spain's Fernando Verdasco and Feliciano López. Kiefer and Zverev lost the match. In the first round of the U.S. Open, he beat Michaël Llodra in straight sets, but in the second round he lost to world No. 3 Rafael Nadal.

== Major finals ==
=== Olympic finals ===
==== Doubles: 1 (1 silver medal) ====
Result	Year	Championship	Surface	Partner	Opponents	Score
Silver	2004	Athens Olympics	Hard	(Germany) Rainer Schüttler	(Chile) Fernando González (Chile) Nicolás Massú	2–6, 6–4, 6–3, 6–7^{(7–9)}, 4–6

=== Masters Series finals ===
==== Singles: 1 (1 runner-up) ====
Result	Year	Tournament	Surface	Opponent	Score
Loss	2008	Toronto, Canada	Hard	(Spain) Rafael Nadal	3–6, 2–6

== Career finals ==
=== Singles: 19 (6 titles, 13 runner-ups) ===
Legend
Grand Slam (0–0)
Tennis Masters Cup (0–0)
ATP Masters Series (0–1)
ATP International Series Gold (1–3)
ATP Tour (5–9)

Result	W/L	Date	Tournament	Surface	Opponent	Score
Win	1–0	Sep 1997	Toulouse, France	Hard (i)	(Australia) Mark Philippoussis	7–5, 5–7, 6–4
Loss	1–1	Oct 1997	Singapore, Singapore	Carpet	(Sweden) Magnus Gustafsson	6–4, 3–6, 3–6
Loss	1–2	Feb 1999	Dubai, United Arab Emirates	Hard	(France) Jérôme Golmard	4–6, 2–6
Win	2–2	Apr 1999	Tokyo, Japan	Hard	(South Africa) Wayne Ferreira	7–6^{(7–5)}, 7–5
Win	3–2	Jun 1999	Halle, Germany	Grass	(Sweden) Nicklas Kulti	6–3, 6–2
Win	4–2	Sep 1999	Tashkent, Uzbekistan	Hard	(Switzerland) George Bastl	6–4, 6–2
Loss	4–3	Oct 1999	Vienna, Austria	Carpet	(United Kingdom) Greg Rusedski	7–6^{(7–5)}, 6–2, 3–6, 5–7, 4–6
Win	5–3	Feb 2000	Dubai, United Arab Emirates	Hard	(Spain) Juan Carlos Ferrero	7–5, 4–6, 6–3
Win	6–3	Oct 2000	Hong Kong, China	Hard	(Australia) Mark Philippoussis	7–6^{(7–4)}, 2–6, 6–2
Loss	6–4	Oct 2001	Moscow, Russia (1)	Carpet (i)	(Russia) Yevgeny Kafelnikov	4–6, 5–7
Loss	6–5	Jun 2002	Halle, Germany (1)	Grass	(Russia) Yevgeny Kafelnikov	6–2, 4–6, 4–6
Loss	6–6	Jun 2003	Halle, Germany (2)	Grass	(Switzerland) Roger Federer	1–6, 3–6
Loss	6–7	Feb 2004	Memphis, United States	Hard	(Sweden) Joachim Johansson	6–7^{(5–7)}, 3–6
Loss	6–8	Mar 2004	Scottsdale, United States	Hard	(United States) Vince Spadea	5–7, 7–6^{(7–5)}, 3–6
Loss	6–9	Jul 2004	Indianapolis, United States	Hard	(United States) Andy Roddick	2–6, 3–6
Loss	6–10	Jul 2004	Los Angeles, United States	Hard	(Germany) Tommy Haas	6–7^{(6–8)}, 4–6
Loss	6–11	Oct 2005	Moscow, Russia (2)	Carpet (i)	(Russia) Igor Andreev	7–5, 6–7^{(3–7)}, 2–6
Loss	6–12	Oct 2005	St. Petersburg, Russia	Carpet (i)	(Sweden) Thomas Johansson	4–6, 2–6
Loss	6–13	Jul 2008	Toronto, Canada	Hard	(Spain) Rafael Nadal	3–6, 2–6

=== Doubles (3 titles, 1 runner-up) ===
Legend
Grand Slam (0–0)
Olympics (0–1)
Tennis Masters Cup (0–0)
ATP Masters Series (0–0)
ATP International Series Gold (1–0)
ATP Tour (3–0)

Result	W/L	Date	Tournament	Surface	Partner	Opponents	Score
Win	1–0	Oct 1998	Ostrava, Czech Republic	Carpet	(Germany) David Prinosil	(South Africa) David Adams (Czech Republic) Pavel Vízner	6–4, 6–3
Win	2–0	Jul 2002	Los Angeles, United States	Hard	(France) Sébastien Grosjean	(United States) Justin Gimelstob (France) Michaël Llodra	6–4, 6–4
Win	3–0	Sep 2003	Tokyo, Japan	Hard	(United States) Justin Gimelstob	(The Bahamas) Mark Merklein (United States) Scott Humphries	6–7^{(6–8)}, 6–3, 7–6^{(7–4)}
Loss	3–1	Aug 2004	Olympics, Athens, Greece	Hard	(Germany) Rainer Schüttler	(Chile) Fernando González (Chile) Nicolás Massú	2–6, 6–4, 6–3, 6–7^{(7–9)}, 4–6

== Performance timeline ==
Key
W	F	SF	QF	#R	RR	Q#	DNQ	A	NH

(W) winner; (F) finalist; (SF) semifinalist; (QF) quarterfinalist; (#R) rounds 4, 3, 2, 1; (RR) round-robin stage; (Q#) qualification round; (DNQ) did not qualify; (A) absent; (NH) not held; (SR) strike rate (events won / competed); (W–L) win–loss record.

=== Singles ===
Tournament	1995	1996	1997	1998	1999	2000	2001	2002	2003	2004	2005	2006	2007	2008	2009	2010	SR	W–L
Grand Slam tournaments
Australian Open	A	1R	A	QF	3R	QF	2R	1R	A	1R	1R	SF	A	1R	A	A	0 / 10	16–10
French Open	A	Q1	1R	2R	1R	1R	1R	1R	2R	2R	4R	3R	A	A	2R	A	0 / 11	9–10
Wimbledon	Q2	A	QF	3R	2R	1R	4R	3R	1R	1R	3R	A	3R	3R	1R	1R	0 / 13	18–13
US Open	A	A	A	3R	3R	QF	1R	1R	2R	4R	4R	A	2R	1R	2R	A	0 / 11	17–11
Win–loss	0–0	0–1	4–2	9–4	5–4	8–4	4–4	2–4	2–3	4–4	8–3	7–2	3–2	2–3	2–3	0–1	0 / 45	60–44
Year-end championship
Tennis Masters Cup	Did not qualify				SF	Did not qualify											0 / 1	2–2
ATP Masters Series
Indian Wells Masters	A	A	A	3R	3R	1R	3R	2R	2R	1R	QF	2R	A	1R	3R	A	0 / 11	12–11
Miami Masters	A	A	2R	3R	QF	2R	2R	1R	1R	QF	2R	4R	A	3R	3R	A	0 / 12	16–12
Monte Carlo Masters	A	A	A	2R	A	A	1R	1R	A	2R	2R	3R	A	2R	1R	A	0 / 8	6–8
Rome Masters	A	A	Q1	A	3R	A	3R	1R	A	1R	2R	2R	A	1R	1R	A	0 / 8	6–8
Hamburg Masters (Note: Held as Hamburg Masters (outdoor clay) until 2008, Madrid Masters (outdoor clay) 2009 – present.)	Q2	1R	2R	1R	A	A	3R	1R	1R	1R	2R	2R	A	QF	1R	Q1	0 / 11	8–11
Canada Masters	A	A	A	3R	SF	2R	2R	1R	A	SF	3R	A	2R	F	1R	A	0 / 10	20–10
Cincinnati Masters	A	A	A	1R	3R	1R	3R	2R	A	2R	2R	A	2R	A	1R	A	0 / 9	8–9
Madrid Masters (Note: Held as Essen / Stuttgart Masters from 1995 to 2001, held as Madrid Masters (indoor hard) from 2002 to 2008, and Shanghai Masters (outdoor hard) 2009 – present.)	1R	2R	QF	2R	2R	A	1R	A	A	A	1R	A	SF	1R	A	A	0 / 9	9–9
Paris Masters	A	A	A	2R	A	A	1R	A	A	A	1R	A	1R	2R	A	A	0 / 5	2–5
Win–loss	0–1	1–2	5–3	9–8	13–6	1–4	10–9	2–7	1–3	10–7	9–9	6–5	6–4	12–8	2–7	0–0	0 / 83	87–83
National representation
Olympic Games	NH	A	Not Held			1R	Not Held			3R	Not Held			3R	NH		0 / 3	5–3
Davis Cup	A	A	A	QF	1R	A	QF	1R	PO	PO	PO	1R	A	QF	QF	A	0 / 7	10–11
Career statistics
Titles	0	0	1	0	3	2	0	0	0	0	0	0	0	0	0	0	6	
Finals	0	0	2	0	5	2	1	1	1	4	2	0	0	1	0	0	19	
Year-end ranking	206	128	32	35	6	20	42	72	58	21	22	48	49	38	116	722		

== Top 10 wins ==
Season	1995	1996	1997	1998	1999	2000	2001	2002	2003	2004	2005	2006	2007	2008	2009	2010	Total
Wins	0	0	3	3	10	2	2	3	0	2	4	1	1	4	0	0	35

#	Player	Rank	Event	Surface	Rd	Score	KR
1997
1.	(Russia) Yevgeny Kafelnikov	6	Wimbledon, London, United Kingdom	Grass	4R	6–2, 7–5, 2–6, 6–1	98
2.	(Chile) Marcelo Ríos	8	Singapore, Singapore	Carpet (i)	QF	6–1, 7–5	48
3.	(United Kingdom) Greg Rusedski	5	Stuttgart, Germany	Carpet (i)	2R	5–7, 6–2, 6–4	34
1998
4.	(Sweden) Jonas Björkman	7	Miami, United States	Hard	3R	7–6^{(8–6)}, 7–6^{(7–3)}	27
5.	(Czech Republic) Petr Korda	2	World Team Cup, Düsseldorf, Germany	Clay	F	7–5, 6–3	24
6.	(Czech Republic) Petr Korda	5	Basel, Switzerland	Hard (i)	1R	6–2, 6–4	28
1999
7.	(Spain) Carlos Moyá	5	Australian Open, Melbourne, Australia	Hard	1R	6–7^{(7–9)}, 6–4, 7–6^{(8–6)}, 6–3	37
8.	(Australia) Pat Rafter	5	Indian Wells, United States	Hard	2R	7–6^{(7–2)}, 3–6, 7–5	33
9.	(Australia) Pat Rafter	5	Miami, United States	Hard	3R	7–6^{(7–5)}, 6–4	30
10.	(Netherlands) Richard Krajicek	5	Rome, Italy	Clay	2R	6–3, 6–2	23
11.	(Australia) Pat Rafter	2	Montreal, Canada	Hard	QF	6–3, 6–7^{(5–7)}, 7–6^{(7–4)}	17
12.	(United Kingdom) Greg Rusedski	8	Basel, Switzerland	Carpet (i)	QF	2–6, 7–6^{(7–4)}, 6–3	12
13.	(Russia) Yevgeny Kafelnikov	2	Vienna, Austria	Hard (i)	QF	6–0, 6–4	11
14.	(Netherlands) Richard Krajicek	8	Vienna, Austria	Hard (i)	SF	7–6^{(11–9)}, 6–4	11
15.	(United States) Todd Martin	7	ATP Tour World Championships, Hanover, Germany	Hard (i)	RR	6–3, 6–2	6
16.	(Russia) Yevgeny Kafelnikov	2	ATP Tour World Championships, Hanover, Germany	Hard (i)	RR	6–1, 4–6, 6–2	6
2000
17.	(Sweden) Magnus Norman	3	US Open, New York, United States	Hard	4R	6–2, 6–7^{(3–7)}, 6–1, 6–3	14
18.	(United Kingdom) Tim Henman	10	Hong Kong, Hong Kong	Hard	SF	6–4, 6–2	13
2001
19.	(Russia) Yevgeny Kafelnikov	6	Rotterdam, Netherlands	Hard (i)	2R	6–4, 6–2	55
20.	(Australia) Pat Rafter	8	World Team Cup, Düsseldorf, Germany	Clay	RR	1–6, 6–2, 6–4	28
2002
21.	(Russia) Yevgeny Kafelnikov	4	Munich, Germany	Clay	1R	6–4, 6–7^{(7–9)}, 6–3	47
22.	(Russia) Marat Safin	2	World Team Cup, Düsseldorf, Germany	Clay	RR	6–4, 2–6, 7–6^{(7–5)}	63
23.	(Switzerland) Roger Federer	10	Halle, Germany	Grass	SF	4–6, 6–4, 6–4	66
2004
24.	(Germany) Rainer Schüttler	7	Miami, United States	Hard	2R	6–4, 4–6, 7–6^{(7–3)}	44
25.	(Spain) Carlos Moyá	5	Toronto, Canada	Hard	3R	6–4, 2–6, 6–4	25
2005
26.	(Russia) Marat Safin	4	Dubai, United Arab Emirates	Hard	1R	7–6^{(7–2)}, 6–4	30
27.	(Argentina) Gastón Gaudio	8	Indian Wells, United States	Hard	3R	6–3, 6–1	31
28.	(Argentina) David Nalbandian	10	Indian Wells, United States	Hard	4R	6–1, 6–3	31
29.	(Russia) Nikolay Davydenko	8	St. Petersburg, Russia	Carpet (i)	QF	6–1, 6–1	29
2006
30.	(Argentina) Gastón Gaudio	10	World Team Cup, Düsseldorf, Germany	Clay	RR	6–2, 6–3	13
2007
31.	(Chile) Fernando González	6	Madrid, Spain	Hard (i)	QF	7–6^{(7–5)}, 6–2	112
2008
32.	(Switzerland) Stan Wawrinka	10	Hamburg, Germany	Clay	2R	7–5, 7–5	41
33.	(Russia) Nikolay Davydenko	4	Hamburg, Germany	Clay	3R	7–5, 6–3	41
34.	(Russia) Nikolay Davydenko	4	Toronto, Canada	Hard	3R	4–6, 6–4, 6–4	37
35.	(United States) James Blake	8	Toronto, Canada	Hard	QF	6–1, 6–2	37

== Record against No. 1 players ==
Kiefer's match record against players who have been ranked world No. 1.

Player	Years	Matches	Record	Win %	Hard	Clay	Grass	Carpet
(Australia) Patrick Rafter	1999–2001	5	4–1	80%	3–1	1–0	0–0	0–0
(Spain) Carlos Moyá	1998–2004	5	3–2	60%	2–1	1–1	0–0	0–0
(Russia) Marat Safin	1999–2007	7	4–3	57%	3–2	1–0	0–0	0–1
(Austria) Thomas Muster	1998	2	1–1	50%	1–0	0–1	0–0	0–0
(Chile) Marcelo Ríos	1997–1998	2	1–1	50%	0–1	0–0	0–0	1–0
(Russia) Yevgeny Kafelnikov	1997–2003	15	6–9	40%	4–4	1–0	1–2	0–3
(Spain) Juan Carlos Ferrero	2000–2008	5	2–3	40%	2–1	0–1	0–0	0–1
(Brazil) Gustavo Kuerten	1998–2002	3	1–2	33%	1–1	0–1	0–0	0–0
(United States) Pete Sampras	1998–2002	4	1–3	25%	0–3	0–0	1–0	0–0
(Switzerland) Roger Federer	2000–2009	15	3–12	20%	1–8	0–1	1–3	1–0
(United States) Jim Courier	1996	1	0–1	0%	0–0	0–0	0–1	0–0
(Germany) Boris Becker	1997–1999	2	0–2	0%	0–0	0–1	0–1	0–0
(Serbia) Novak Djokovic	2007	2	0–2	0%	0–1	0–0	0–1	0–0
(Australia) Lleyton Hewitt	1999–2003	3	0–3	0%	0–3	0–0	0–0	0–0
(Spain) Rafael Nadal	2008–2009	5	0–5	0%	0–4	0–0	0–1	0–0
(United States) Andy Roddick	2002–2009	5	0–5	0%	0–5	0–0	0–0	0–0
(United States) Andre Agassi	1998–2005	6	0–6	0%	0–4	0–1	0–1	0–0
