= Slovakia at the 1996 Summer Olympics =

- IOC code: SVK
- NOC: Slovak Olympic and Sports Committee
- Website: www.olympic.sk (in Slovak)

in Atlanta
- Competitors: 71 (58 men and 13 women) in 14 sports
- Flag bearer: Jozef Lohyňa
- Medals Ranked 43rd: Gold 1 Silver 1 Bronze 1 Total 3

Summer Olympics appearances (overview)
- 1996; 2000; 2004; 2008; 2012; 2016; 2020; 2024

Other related appearances
- Hungary (1896–1912); Czechoslovakia (1924–1992)

Slovakia was represented at the 1996 Summer Olympics in Atlanta, Georgia, United States by the Slovak Olympic and Sports Committee. It was their first appearance at the Summer Games as an independent country following the dissolution of Czechoslovakia in 1992.

In total, 71 athletes including 58 men and 13 woman represented Slovakia in 14 different sports including athletics, boxing, canoeing, cycling, gymnastics, judo, rowing, sailing, shooting, swimming, table tennis, tennis, weightlifting and wrestling.

Slovakia won a total of three medals at the games after Michal Martikán claimed gold in the canoeing men's slalom C-1, Slavomír Kňazovický won silver in the canoeing men's C-1 500 m and Jozef Gönci claimed bronze in the men's shooting 50 m rifle prone.

== Competitors ==
In total, 71 athletes represented Slovakia at the 1996 Summer Olympics in Atlanta, Georgia, United States across 14 different sports.

Sport	Men	Women	Total
Athletics	12	3	15
Boxing	2	—	2
Canoeing	15	2	17
Cycling	8	2	10
Gymnastics	0	1	1
Judo	2	0	2
Rowing	2	0	2
Sailing	4	0	4
Shooting	3	0	3
Swimming	1	2	3
Table tennis	0	1	1
Tennis	2	3	5
Weightlifting	3	—	3
Wrestling	4	—	4
Total	58	13	71

== Medalists ==
Slovakia won a total of three medals at the games after Michal Martikán claimed gold in the canoeing men's slalom C-1, Slavomír Kňazovický won silver in the canoeing men's C-1 500 m and Jozef Gönci claimed bronze in the men's shooting 50 m rifle prone.

Medal	Name	Sport	Event	Date
Gold	Michal Martikán	Canoeing	Men's slalom C-1	July 27
Silver	Slavomír Kňazovický	Canoeing	Men's C-1 500 me	August 4
Bronze	Jozef Gönci	Shooting	Men's 50 m rifle prone	July 25

== Athletics ==
In total, 15 Slovakian athletes participated in the athletics events.

Men
Track & road events

Athlete	Event	Heat		Quarterfinal		Semifinal		Final	
Athlete	Event	Result	Rank	Result	Rank	Result	Rank	Result	Rank
Štefan Balošák	400 m	45.86	3 Q	45.32	4 Q	45.59	6	did not advance	
Pavol Blažek	20 km walk	—						1:29:41	46
Igor Kollár	20 km walk	—						DSQ	
Igor Kováč	110 m hurdles	13.62	16 Q	13.70	25	did not advance			
Jozef Kucej	400 m hurdles	50.31	6	did not advance					
Štefan Malík	50 km walk	—						3:58:40	21
Roman Mrazek	50 km walk	—						3:58:20	20
Róbert Štefko	10,000 m	29:03.80	14	did not advance					
Peter Tichý	50 km walk	—						4:10:55	32
Róbert Valíček	20 km walk	—						1:27:27	38
Miroslav Vanko	5,000 m	13:54.88	6 Q	—		13:51.45	12	did not advance	
Miroslav Vanko	10,000 m	29:17.53	18	did not advance					

Field events

Athlete	Event	Qualification		Final	
Athlete	Event	Distance	Position	Distance	Position
Jaroslav Žitňanský	Discus throw	51.50	38	did not advance	

Women
Field events

Athlete	Event	Qualification		Final	
Athlete	Event	Distance	Position	Distance	Position
Galina Chistyakova	Long jump	6.33	22	did not advance	
Galina Chistyakova	Triple jump	14.14	14	did not advance	
Alica Javadová	High jump	1.85	24	did not advance	

== Boxing ==
In total, two Slovakian athletes participated in the boxing events.

Athlete	Event	Round of 32	Round of 16	Quarterfinals	Semifinals	Final	
Athlete	Event	Opposition Result	Opposition Result	Opposition Result	Opposition Result	Opposition Result	Rank
Peter Baláž	Light flyweight	La Paene Masara (INA); L 3-13	did not advance				17
Gabriel Križan	Bantamweight	BYE	Rachid Bouaita (FRA); L 6-13	did not advance			9

== Canoeing ==
In total, 17 Slovakian athletes participated in the canoeing events.

=== Slalom ===
Athlete	Event	Final					
Athlete	Event	Run 1	Rank	Run 2	Rank	Total	Rank
Gabriela Brosková	Women's K-1	230.67	17	172.57	5	172.57	5
Elena Kaliská	Women's K-1	229.85	16	190.45	13	190.45	19
Michal Martikán	Men's C-1	160.88	6	151.03	1	151.03	Gold medal
Juraj Minčík	Men's C-1	182.60	20	166.45	10	166.45	15
Peter Nagy	Men's K-1	211.54	36	148.35	7	148.35	13
Ľuboš Šoška; Peter Šoška	Men's C-2	184.90	7	175.38	9	175.38	10
Roman Štrba; Roman Vajs	Men's C-2	194.40	10	200.67	13	194.40	13
Miroslav Stanovský	Men's K-1	165.17	24	146.59	6	146.59	10

=== Sprint ===
Athlete	Event	Heats		Repechage		Semifinals		Final	
Athlete	Event	Time	Rank	Time	Rank	Time	Rank	Time	Rank
Róbert Erban	K-1 500 m	1:43.563	5 QR	1:43.184	1 QS	1:41.425	4 QF	1:40.407	8
Róbert Erban	K-1 1000 m	3:48.956	4 QR	4:01.917	1 QS	3:46.633	5	Did not advance	12
Slavomír Kňazovický	C-1 500 m	1:52.971	2 QF	—		BYE		1:50.510	Silver medal
Ján Kubica	C-1 1000 m	4:33.810	7 QS	—		4:22.773	4	Did not advance	14
Csaba Orosz; Peter Páleš	C-2 500 m	1:45.893	4 QR	1:47.965	2 QS	1:43.757	5 QF	1:44.116	8
Csaba Orosz; Peter Páleš	C-2 1000 m	4:12.789	3 QS	BYE		3:44.628	2 QF	3:36.938	7
Juraj Kadnár; Attila Szabó	K-2 1000 m	3:49.026	6 R	3:34.436	2 QS	3:20.904	6	Did not advance	11

== Cycling ==
In total, 10 Slovakian athletes participated in the cycling events.

=== Road ===
Men

Athlete	Event	Time	Rank
Milan Dvorščík	Men's road race	4:56:46	59
Milan Dvorščík	Men's time trial	1:12:54	34
Miroslav Lipták	Men's road race	dnf	
Miroslav Lipták	Men's time trial	1:12:28	31
Róbert Nagy	Men's road race	dnf	
Ján Valach	Men's road race	4:56:48	68
Pavol Zaduban	Men's road race	5:05:38	114

Women

Athlete	Event	Time	Rank
Lenka Ilavská	Women's road race	02:37:06	24
Lenka Ilavská	Women's time trial	39:57	17
Eva Orvošová	Women's road race	02:37:06	27

=== Track ===
Athlete	Event	Qualification		Round 1	Repechage 1	Round 2	Repechage 2	1/8 final	Repechage 3	Quarterfinals	Classification 5-8	Semifinals	Final	
Athlete	Event	Time Speed (km/h)	Rank	Opposition Time Speed (km/h)	Opposition Time Speed (km/h)	Opposition Time Speed (km/h)	Opposition Time Speed (km/h)	Opposition Time Speed (km/h)	Opposition Time Speed (km/h)	Opposition Time Speed (km/h)	Opposition Time Speed (km/h)	Opposition Time Speed (km/h)	Opposition Time Speed (km/h)	Rank
Peter Bazálik	Men's sprint	10.837; 66.43	20 Q	Pokorny (GER); L	van Zyl (RSA); W 11.222	Harnett (CAN); L	Moreno (ESP); Himonetos (GRE); L	did not advance						
Martin Hrbáček	Men's sprint	10.693; 67.33	16 Q	Berzins (LAT); L	Capitano (ITA); W 11.076	Nothstein (USA); L	did not advance							

=== Mountain biking ===
Athlete	Event	Time	Rank
Peter Hric	Men's cross-country	2:46:22	30
Lenka Ilavská	Women's cross-country	2:04.143	21
Eva Loweová-Orvošová	Women's cross-country	1:57.56	9

== Gymnastics ==
In total, one Slovakian athlete participated in the gymnastics events.

Athlete	Event	Qualification						Final					
Athlete	Event	Apparatus				Total	Rank	Apparatus				Total	Rank
Athlete	Event	F	V	UB	BB	Total	Rank	F	V	UB	BB	Total	Rank
Klaudia Kinská	All-around	18.062	17.687	16.925	17.874	70.548	70	did not advance					

== Judo ==
In total, two Slovakian athletes participated in the judo events.

Athlete	Event	Preliminary	Round of 32	Round of 16	Quarterfinals	Semifinals	Repechage 1	Repechage 2	Repechage 3	Final / BM	
Athlete	Event	Opposition Result	Opposition Result	Opposition Result	Opposition Result	Opposition Result	Opposition Result	Opposition Result	Opposition Result	Opposition Result	Rank
Marek Matuszek	−60 kg	BYE	Franck Chambilly (FRA); L 0000-0100	did not advance							17
Semir Pepic	−95 kg	Mohamed Bu Sakher (KUW); W 1000-0000	Daniel Gowing (HUN); L 0000-0100	did not advance							17

== Rowing ==
In total, two Slovakian athletes participated in the rowing events.

Athlete	Event	Heats		Repechage		Semifinals		Final	
Athlete	Event	Time	Rank	Time	Rank	Time	Rank	Time	Rank
Ondrej Hambálek; Ján Žiška	Double sculls	6:55.87	4 R	6:53.54	2 SA/B	6:55.73	6 FB	6:26.51	11

== Sailing ==
In total, four Slovakian athletes participated in the sailing events.

Athlete	Event	Race											Net points	Final rank
Athlete	Event	1	2	3	4	5	6	7	8	9	10	11	Net points	Final rank
Patrik Pollak	Mistral	19	23	25	19	~~29~~	16	~~35~~	25	28	—		155.0	27
Marek Valasek	Finn	5	17	26	~~28~~	~~27~~	6	23	20	25	26	—	148.0	25
Igor Karvas; Jaroslav Ferianec	470	28	~~36~~	31	31	29	20	~~34~~	29	23	31	32	254.0	32

== Shooting ==
In total, three Slovakian athletes participated in the shooting events.

Athlete	Event	Qualification		Final	
Athlete	Event	Score	Rank	Score	Rank
Ján Fabo	10 m air pistol	569	44	did not advance	
Ján Fabo	50 m pistol	556	20	did not advance	
Jozef Gönci	50 m rifle three positions	1166	7 Q	1267.7	5
Jozef Gönci	50 m rifle prone	599	2 Q	701.9	Bronze medal
Jozef Gönci	10 m air rifle	584	28	did not advance	
Vladimir Slamka	Trap	122	5 Q	145	6
Vladimir Slamka	Double trap	126	25	did not advance	

== Swimming ==
In total, three Slovakian athletes participated in the swimming events.

Men

Athlete	Event	Heat		Final B		Final	
Athlete	Event	Time	Rank	Time	Rank	Time	Rank
Miroslav Machovič	100 m backstroke	57.78	34	did not advance			
Miroslav Machovič	200 m backstroke	2:04.15	19	did not advance			

Women

Athlete	Event	Heat		Final B		Final	
Athlete	Event	Time	Rank	Time	Rank	Time	Rank
Natália Kodajová	100 metre breaststroke	1:14.24	37	did not advance			
Natália Kodajová	200 metre breaststroke	2:45.21	38	did not advance			
Martina Moravcová	100 metre freestyle	56.20	11 Q	56.47	15	did not advance	
Martina Moravcová	200 metre freestyle	2:00.99	9 Q	2:00.96	9	did not advance	
Martina Moravcová	400 metre freestyle	4:22.10	27	did not advance			
Martina Moravcová	200 metre individual medley	2:16.50	9 Q	2:17.40	13	did not advance	

== Table tennis ==
In total, one Slovakian athlete participated in the table tennis events.

Athlete	Event	Group round		Round of 16	Quarterfinals	Semifinals	Bronze medal	Final
Athlete	Event	Opposition Result	Rank	Opposition Result	Opposition Result	Opposition Result	Opposition Result	Rank
Valentina Popovová	Women's singles	Group D Wei (CHN); L 1 – 2 Feng (USA); L 0 – 2 Rodríguez (CHI); W 2 – 0	3	did not advance				

== Tennis ==
In total, five Slovakian athletes participated in the tennis events.

Men

Athlete	Event	Round of 64	Round of 32	Round of 16	Quarterfinals	Semifinals	Final	
Athlete	Event	Opposition Score	Opposition Score	Opposition Score	Opposition Score	Opposition Score	Opposition Score	Rank
Ján Krošlák	Singles	MaliVai Washington (USA); L 3–6, 6-7	did not advance					
Karol Kučera	Singles	Dmitri Tomashevich (UZB); L 6–3, 2–6, 6-0	Andre Agassi (USA); L 4–6, 4–6	did not advance				
Ján Krošlák; Karol Kučera	Doubles	BYE	Neil Broad; Tim Henman (GBR); L 3–6, 3-6	did not advance				

Women

Athlete	Event	Round of 64	Round of 32	Round of 16	Quarterfinals	Semifinals	Final	
Athlete	Event	Opposition Score	Opposition Score	Opposition Score	Opposition Score	Opposition Score	Opposition Score	Rank
Karina Habšudová	Singles	Yayuk Basuki (INA); W 6–3, 6-3	Laurence Courtois (BEL); W 7–5, 6-2	Iva Majoli (CRO); L 4–6, 6–3, 4–6	did not advance			
Katarína Studeníková	Singles	Ai Sugiyama (JPN); L 2–6, 3–6	did not advance					
Radomíra Zrubáková	Singles	Jana Nejedly (CAN); W 6–3, 6-2	Conchita Martínez (ESP); L 1–6, 4–6	did not advance				
Karina Habšudová; Radka Zrubáková	Doubles	BYE	Martina Hingis; Patty Schnyder (SUI); L 6–3, 4–6, 2-6	did not advance				

== Weightlifting ==
In total, three Slovakian athletes participated in the weightlifting events.

Athlete	Event	Snatch		Clean & Jerk		Total	Rank
Athlete	Event	Result	Rank	Result	Rank	Total	Rank
Rudolf Lukáč	−70 kg	135.0	20	167.5	20	302.5	20
Martin Tešovič	−91 kg	162.5	17	210.0	6	372.5	10
Jaroslav Jokeľ	−99 kg	160.0	16	192.5	16	352.5	16

== Wrestling ==
In total, four Slovakian athletes participated in the wrestling events.

Athlete	Event	Round 1	Round 2	Round 3	Round 4	Round 5	Round 6	Final / BM	
Athlete	Event	Opposition Result	Opposition Result	Opposition Result	Opposition Result	Opposition Result	Opposition Result	Opposition Result	Rank
Roman Kollár	−52 kg	Hideo Sasayama (JPN); L 0-6	Carlos Varela (CUB); W 3-2	Greg Woodcroft (CAN); L 3-6	did not advance				13
Radion Kertanti	−74 kg	Turan Ceylan (TUR); W 4-3	Kenny Monday (USA); L 1-5	Victor Peicov (MDA); L 0-5	did not advance				15
Jozef Lohyňa	−90 kg	Tatsuo Kawai (JPN); W 5-0	Bayanmönkhiin Gantogtokh (MGL); W 5-3	Kim Ik-hee (KOR); W 3-0	Makharbek Khadartsev (RUS); L 1-7	BYE	Victor Kodei (NGR); W 10-0	Eldar Kurtanidze (GEO); L 0-5	4
Milan Mazáč	−100 kg	Konstantin Aleksandrov (KGZ); L 1-2	Dolgorsürengiin Sumiyaabazar (MGL); L 2-4	did not advance					15
