= Cycling at the 1996 Summer Olympics – Men's sprint =

Cycling at the Olympics

Men's sprint at the Games of the XXVI Olympiad
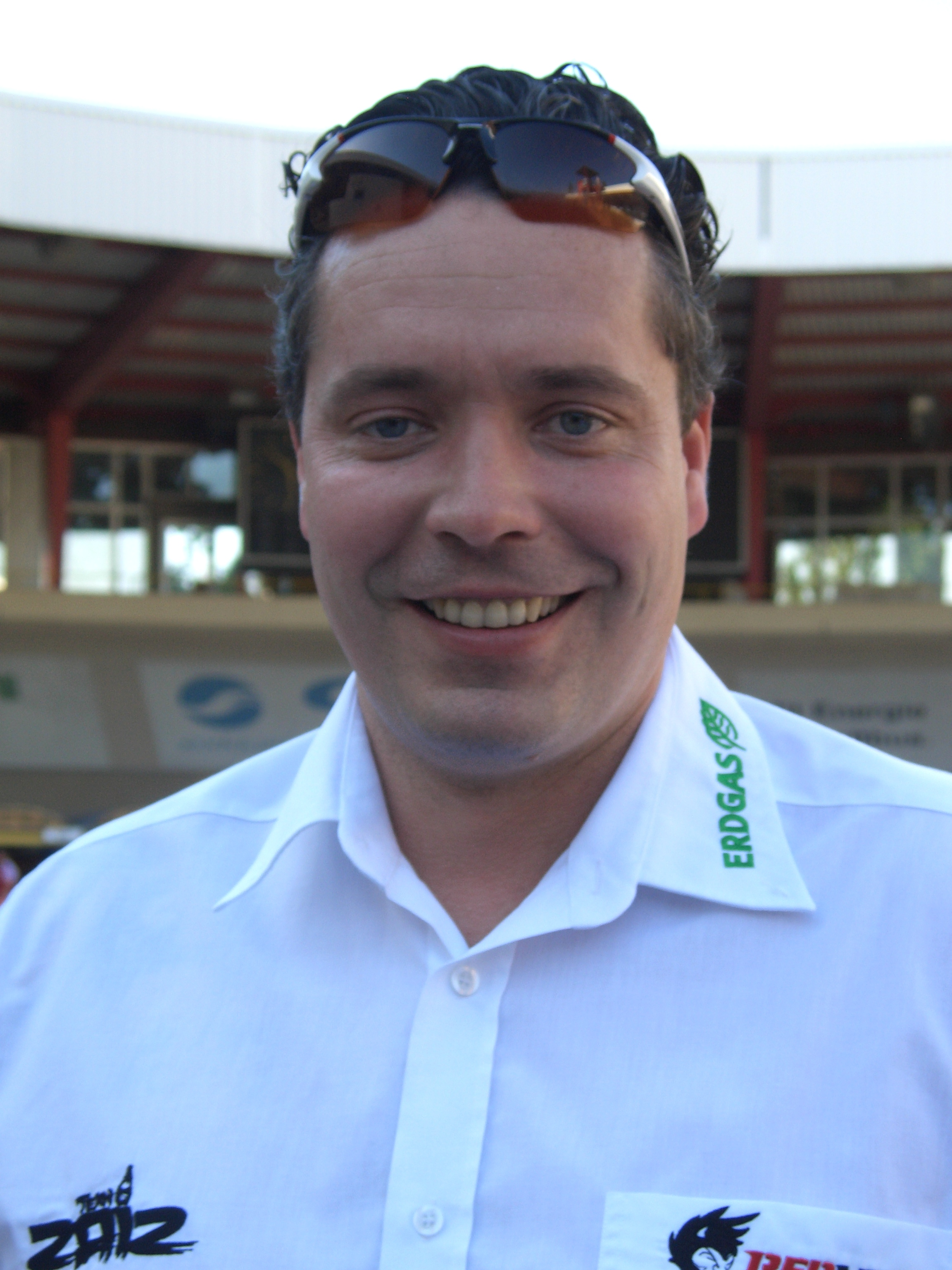
- Jens Fiedler (2010)
- Venue: Stone Mountain Park Velodrome
- Dates: 24–28 July
- Competitors: 24 from 16 nations

Medalists
| 1st place, gold medalist(s) | | Jens Fiedler; Germany |
| 2nd place, silver medalist(s) | | Marty Nothstein; United States |
| 3rd place, bronze medalist(s) | | Curt Harnett; Canada |

The men's sprint at the 1996 Summer Olympics (Cycling) was an event that consisted of cyclists making three laps around the track. Only the time for the last 200 metres of the 750 metres covered was counted as official time. The races were held on July 24 through July 28, 1996 at the Stone Mountain Velodrome. There were 24 competitors from 16 nations, with nations once again being allowed to have up to two cyclists each (the limit had fluctuated between one and two for most of the history of the event). The event was won by Jens Fiedler of Germany, the second man to successfully defend an Olympic sprint title (and third to win two gold medals overall). Curt Harnett of Canada also repeated as bronze medalist; he and Fiedler were the fifth and sixth men to win multiple medals of any color in the event. Marty Nothstein of the United States took silver, the nation's first medal in the event since 1984.

== Background ==
This was the 21st appearance of the event, which has been held at every Summer Olympics except 1904 and 1912. Five of the quarterfinalists from 1992 returned: gold medalist Jens Fiedler of Germany, silver medalist Gary Neiwand of Australia, bronze medalist Curt Harnett of Canada, fourth-place finisher Roberto Chiappa of Italy, and eighth-place finisher José Manuel Moreno of Spain. There was no clear favorite. Neither Fiedler nor Harnett had had much success between Games. Neiwand had won the World Championship in 1993; two other recent world champions—American Marty Nothstein (1994) and Australian Darryn Hill (1995) were also competing in Atlanta.

The Czech Republic and Slovakia each made their debut in the men's sprint (after the breakup of Czechoslovakia, which had competed 10 times in the sprint). France made its 21st appearance, the only nation to have competed at every appearance of the event.

== Competition format ==
This sprint competition involved a series of head-to-head matches along with the new qualifying round of time trials. There were six main match rounds, with three one-round repechages.

- Qualifying round: Each of the 24 competitors completed a 200-metre flying time trial (reaching full speed before timing started for the last 200 metres). The top 24 advanced to the match rounds, seeded based on their time in the qualifying round. With only 24 riders starting, nobody was eliminated.
- Round 1: The 24 cyclists were seeded into 12 heats of 2 cyclists each. The winner of each heat advanced to round 2 (12 cyclists) while the other cyclists went to the first repechage (12 cyclists).
- First repechage: The 12 cyclists were divided into 6 heats, each with 2 cyclists. The winner of each heat advanced to round 2 (6 cyclists) while the losers were eliminated (6 cyclists).
- Round 2: The 18 cyclists were divided into 9 heats, each with 2 cyclists. The winners of each heat advanced to the 1/8 finals (9 cyclists). The loser in each heat went to the second repechage (9 cyclists).
- Second repechage: The 9 cyclists were divided into 3 heats of 3 cyclists each. The winner of each heat advanced to the 1/8 finals (3 cyclists), while the remaining cyclists were eliminated (6 cyclists).
- 1/8 finals: The 12 remaining cyclists competed in a 1/8 finals round. There were 6 heats in this round, with 2 cyclists in each. The winner in each heat advanced to the quarterfinals (6 cyclists), while the loser in each heat went to the third repechage (6 cyclists).
- Third repechage: This round featured 2 heats, with 3 cyclists each. The winner of each heat advanced to the quarterfinals (2 cyclists); the losers were eliminated (4 cyclists).
- Quarterfinals: Beginning with the quarterfinals, all matches were one-on-one competitions and were held in best-of-three format. There were 4 quarterfinals, with the winner of each advancing to the semifinals and the loser going to the fifth-eighth classification race.
- Semifinals: The two semifinals provided for advancement to the gold medal final for winners and to the bronze medal final for losers.
- Finals: Both a gold medal final and a bronze medal final were held, as well as a classification final for fifth through eighth places for quarterfinal losers.

== Records ==
The records for the sprint are 200 metre flying time trial records, kept for the qualifying round in later Games as well as for the finish of races.

| World record | Curt Harnett (CAN) | 9.865 | Bogotá, Colombia | 28 September 1995 |
| Olympic record | Jens Fiedler (GER) | 10.252 | Barcelona, Spain | 28 July 1992 |

Five men broke the old Olympic record in the qualifying round, though only three held a new record even temporarily. Eyk Pokorny broke it first, with a 10.233 seconds run. Marty Nothstein was next, at 10.176 seconds. Gary Neiwand finished with the record at 10.129 seconds. Curt Harnett and Jens Fiedler also came in under the old record, but not below the record as it stood during their turn for the time trial.

== Schedule ==
All times are Eastern Daylight Time (UTC−4)

| Date | Time | Round |
|---|---|---|
| Wednesday, 24 July 1996 | 10:00; 17:35; 18:45 | Qualifying round Round 1 First repechage |
| Thursday, 25 July 1996 | 10:55 | Round 2 Second repechage |
| Friday, 26 July 1996 | 11:40; 12:30 | 1/8 finals Third repechage |
| Saturday, 27 July 1996 | 11:15; 13:35; 13:45 | Quarterfinals; Semifinals; Classification 5–8 |
| Sunday, 28 July 1996 | 12:15 | Bronze medal match Final |

== Results ==
=== Qualifying round ===
Times and average speeds are listed. All 24 riders advanced to the first round.

| Rank | Cyclist | Nation | Time 200 m | Speed km/h | Notes |
|---|---|---|---|---|---|
| 1 | Gary Neiwand | Australia | 10.129 | 71.08 | Q, OR |
| 2 | Curt Harnett | Canada | 10.175 | 70.76 | Q |
| 3 | Marty Nothstein | United States | 10.176 | 70.75 | Q |
| 4 | Jens Fiedler | Germany | 10.232 | 70.36 | Q |
| 5 | Eyk Pokorny | Germany | 10.233 | 70.36 | Q |
| 6 | Darryn Hill | Australia | 10.329 | 69.70 | Q |
| 7 | Pavel Buráň | Czech Republic | 10.389 | 69.30 | Q |
| 8 | Florian Rousseau | France | 10.397 | 69.25 | Q |
| 9 | Viesturs Bērziņš | Latvia | 10.463 | 68.81 | Q |
| 10 | Roberto Chiappa | Italy | 10.473 | 68.74 | Q |
| 11 | Jose Moreno | Spain | 10.492 | 68.62 | Q |
| 12 | William Clay | United States | 10.543 | 68.29 | Q |
| 13 | George Himonetos | Greece | 10.559 | 68.18 | Q |
| 14 | Frédéric Magné | France | 10.602 | 67.91 | Q |
| 15 | José Antonio Escuredo | Spain | 10.630 | 67.73 | Q |
| 16 | Martin Hrbacek | Slovakia | 10.693 | 67.33 | Q |
| 17 | Jean-Pierre van Zyl | South Africa | 10.695 | 67.32 | Q |
| 18 | Lambros Vasilopoulos | Greece | 10.726 | 67.12 | Q |
| 19 | Yuichiro Kamiyama | Japan | 10.772 | 66.83 | Q |
| 20 | Peter Bazálik | Slovakia | 10.837 | 66.43 | Q |
| 21 | Gianluca Capitano | Italy | 10.895 | 66.08 | Q |
| 22 | Hyeon Byeong-cheol | South Korea | 11.001 | 65.44 | Q |
| 23 | Darren McKenzie Potter | New Zealand | 11.211 | 64.22 | Q |
| 24 | Claus Martínez | Bolivia | 12.341 | 58.34 | Q |

=== Round 1 ===
The first round consisted of twelve heats of two riders each. Winners advanced to the next round, losers competed in the repechage.

==== Round 1 heat 1 ====
| Rank | Cyclist | Nation | Time 200 m | Notes |
|---|---|---|---|---|
| 1 | Gary Neiwand | Australia | 11.191 | Q |
| 2 | Claus Martinez Arroyo | Bolivia | | R |

==== Round 1 heat 2 ====
| Rank | Cyclist | Nation | Time 200 m | Notes |
|---|---|---|---|---|
| 1 | Curt Harnett | Canada | 11.380 | Q |
| 2 | Darren McKenzie Potter | New Zealand | | R |

==== Round 1 heat 3 ====
| Rank | Cyclist | Nation | Time 200 m | Notes |
|---|---|---|---|---|
| 1 | Marty Nothstein | United States | 11.415 | Q |
| 2 | Byung Hyun | South Korea | | R |

==== Round 1 heat 4 ====
| Rank | Cyclist | Nation | Time 200 m | Notes |
|---|---|---|---|---|
| 1 | Jens Fiedler | Germany | 11.722 | Q |
| 2 | Gianluca Capitano | Italy | | R |

==== Round 1 heat 5 ====
| Rank | Cyclist | Nation | Time 200 m | Notes |
|---|---|---|---|---|
| 1 | Eyk Pokorny | Germany | 10.995 | Q |
| 2 | Peter Bazálik | Slovakia | | R |

==== Round 1 heat 6 ====
| Rank | Cyclist | Nation | Time 200 m | Notes |
|---|---|---|---|---|
| 1 | Darryn Hill | Australia | 11.192 | Q |
| 2 | Yuichiro Kamiyama | Japan | | R |

==== Round 1 heat 7 ====
| Rank | Cyclist | Nation | Time 200 m | Notes |
|---|---|---|---|---|
| 1 | Pavel Buráň | Czech Republic | 11.700 | Q |
| 2 | Labros Vassilopoulus | Greece | | R |

==== Round 1 heat 8 ====
| Rank | Cyclist | Nation | Time 200 m | Notes |
|---|---|---|---|---|
| 1 | Florian Rousseau | France | 11.296 | Q |
| 2 | Jean-Pierre van Zyl | South Africa | | R |

==== Round 1 heat 9 ====
| Rank | Cyclist | Nation | Time 200 m | Notes |
|---|---|---|---|---|
| 1 | Viesturs Bērziņš | Latvia | 11.008 | Q |
| 2 | Martin Hrbacek | Slovakia | | R |

==== Round 1 heat 10 ====
| Rank | Cyclist | Nation | Time 200 m | Notes |
|---|---|---|---|---|
| 1 | Roberto Chiappa | Italy | 10.896 | Q |
| 2 | José Antonio Escuredo | Spain | | R |

==== Round 1 heat 11 ====
| Rank | Cyclist | Nation | Time 200 m | Notes |
|---|---|---|---|---|
| 1 | Frédéric Magné | France | 10.740 | Q |
| 2 | Jose Moreno | Spain | | R |

==== Round 1 heat 12 ====
| Rank | Cyclist | Nation | Time 200 m | Notes |
|---|---|---|---|---|
| 1 | George Himonetos | Greece | 11.182 | Q |
| 2 | William Clay | United States | | R |

=== First repechage ===
The twelve defeated cyclists from the first round took part in the first round repechage. The winner of each heat rejoined the twelve victors of the first round in advancing to the second round.

==== First repechage heat 1 ====
| Rank | Cyclist | Nation | Time 200 m | Notes |
|---|---|---|---|---|
| 1 | William Clay | United States | 11.191 | Q |
| 2 | Claus Martinez Arroyo | Bolivia | | |

==== First repechage heat 2 ====
| Rank | Cyclist | Nation | Time 200 m | Notes |
|---|---|---|---|---|
| 1 | Jose Moreno | Spain | 11.017 | Q |
| 2 | Darren McKenzie Potter | New Zealand | | |

==== First repechage heat 3 ====
| Rank | Cyclist | Nation | Time 200 m | Notes |
|---|---|---|---|---|
| 1 | José Antonio Escuredo | Spain | 11.257 | Q |
| 2 | Byung Hyun | South Korea | | |

==== First repechage heat 4 ====
| Rank | Cyclist | Nation | Time 200 m | Notes |
|---|---|---|---|---|
| 1 | Martin Hrbacek | Slovakia | 11.076 | Q |
| 2 | Gianluca Capitano | Italy | | |

==== First repechage heat 5 ====
| Rank | Cyclist | Nation | Time 200 m | Notes |
|---|---|---|---|---|
| 1 | Peter Bazálik | Slovakia | 11.222 | Q |
| 2 | Jean-Pierre van Zyl | South Africa | | |

==== First repechage heat 6 ====
| Rank | Cyclist | Nation | Time 200 m | Notes |
|---|---|---|---|---|
| 1 | Labros Vassilopoulus | Greece | 11.060 | Q |
| 2 | Yuichiro Kamiyama | Japan | | |

=== Round 2 ===
The second round consisted of nine heats of two riders each. Winners advanced to the 1/8 finals, losers competed in the repechage.

==== Round 2 heat 1 ====
| Rank | Cyclist | Nation | Time 200 m | Notes |
|---|---|---|---|---|
| 1 | Gary Neiwand | Australia | 11.249 | Q |
| 2 | Labros Vassilopoulus | Greece | | R |

==== Round 2 heat 2 ====
| Rank | Cyclist | Nation | Time 200 m | Notes |
|---|---|---|---|---|
| 1 | Curt Harnett | Canada | 11.058 | Q |
| 2 | Peter Bazálik | Slovakia | | R |

==== Round 2 heat 3 ====
| Rank | Cyclist | Nation | Time 200 m | Notes |
|---|---|---|---|---|
| 1 | Marty Nothstein | United States | 10.899 | Q |
| 2 | Martin Hrbacek | Slovakia | | R |

==== Round 2 heat 4 ====
| Rank | Cyclist | Nation | Time 200 m | Notes |
|---|---|---|---|---|
| 1 | Jens Fiedler | Germany | 10.597 | Q |
| 2 | José Antonio Escuredo | Spain | | R |

==== Round 2 heat 5 ====
| Rank | Cyclist | Nation | Time 200 m | Notes |
|---|---|---|---|---|
| 1 | Eyk Pokorny | Germany | 10.966 | Q |
| 2 | Jose Moreno | Spain | | R |

==== Round 2 heat 6 ====
| Rank | Cyclist | Nation | Time 200 m | Notes |
|---|---|---|---|---|
| 1 | Darryn Hill | Australia | 10.811 | Q |
| 2 | William Clay | United States | | R |

==== Round 2 heat 7 ====
| Rank | Cyclist | Nation | Time 200 m | Notes |
|---|---|---|---|---|
| 1 | Pavel Buráň | Czech Republic | 11.272 | Q |
| 2 | George Himonetos | Greece | | R |

==== Round 2 heat 8 ====
| Rank | Cyclist | Nation | Time 200 m | Notes |
|---|---|---|---|---|
| 1 | Florian Rousseau | France | 10.745 | Q |
| 2 | Frédéric Magné | France | | R |

==== Round 2 heat 9 ====
| Rank | Cyclist | Nation | Time 200 m | Notes |
|---|---|---|---|---|
| 1 | Viesturs Bērziņš | Latvia | 11.044 | Q |
| 2 | Roberto Chiappa | Italy | | R |

=== Second repechage ===
The nine defeated cyclists from the second round took part in the second round repechage. The winner of each heat rejoined the nine victors of the second round in advancing to the 1/8 finals.

==== Second repechage heat 1 ====
| Rank | Cyclist | Nation | Time 200 m | Notes |
|---|---|---|---|---|
| 1 | Roberto Chiappa | Italy | 11.378 | Q |
| 2 | Labros Vassilopoulus | Greece | | |
| 3 | William Clay | United States | REL | |

==== Second repechage heat 2 ====
| Rank | Cyclist | Nation | Time 200 m | Notes |
|---|---|---|---|---|
| 1 | Jose Moreno | Spain | 11.089 | Q |
| 2 | George Himonetos | Greece | | |
| 3 | Peter Bazálik | Slovakia | | |

==== Second repechage heat 3 ====
| Rank | Cyclist | Nation | Time 200 m | Notes |
|---|---|---|---|---|
| 1 | Frédéric Magné | France | 11.035 | Q |
| 2 | Gianluca Capitano | Italy | | |
| 3 | José Antonio Escuredo | Spain | | |

=== 1/8 finals ===
The 1/8 round consisted of six matches, each pitting two of the twelve remaining cyclists against each other. The winners advanced to the quarterfinals, with the losers getting another chance in the 1/8 repechage.

==== 1/8 final 1 ====
| Rank | Cyclist | Nation | Time 200 m | Notes |
|---|---|---|---|---|
| 1 | Gary Neiwand | Australia | 11.625 | Q |
| 2 | Frédéric Magné | France | | R |

==== 1/8 final 2 ====
| Rank | Cyclist | Nation | Time 200 m | Notes |
|---|---|---|---|---|
| 1 | Curt Harnett | Canada | 10.793 | Q |
| 2 | Jose Moreno | Spain | | R |

==== 1/8 final 3 ====
| Rank | Cyclist | Nation | Time 200 m | Notes |
|---|---|---|---|---|
| 1 | Marty Nothstein | United States | 11.047 | Q |
| 2 | Roberto Chiappa | Italy | | R |

==== 1/8 final 4 ====
| Rank | Cyclist | Nation | Time 200 m | Notes |
|---|---|---|---|---|
| 1 | Jens Fiedler | Germany | 10.808 | Q |
| 2 | Viesturs Bērziņš | Latvia | | R |

==== 1/8 final 5 ====
| Rank | Cyclist | Nation | Time 200 m | Notes |
|---|---|---|---|---|
| 1 | Florian Rousseau | France | 10.828 | Q |
| 2 | Eyk Pokorny | Germany | | R |

==== 1/8 final 6 ====
| Rank | Cyclist | Nation | Time 200 m | Notes |
|---|---|---|---|---|
| 1 | Darryn Hill | Australia | 11.008 | Q |
| 2 | Pavel Buráň | Czech Republic | | R |

=== Third repechage ===
The six cyclists defeated in the 1/8 round competed in the 1/8 repechage. Two heats of three riders were held. Winners rejoined the victors from the 1/8 round and advanced to the quarterfinals.

==== Third repechage heat 1 ====
| Rank | Cyclist | Nation | Time 200 m | Notes |
|---|---|---|---|---|
| 1 | Frédéric Magné | France | 10.975 | Q |
| 2 | Pavel Buráň | Czech Republic | | |
| 3 | Viesturs Bērziņš | Latvia | | |

==== Third repechage heat 2 ====
| Rank | Cyclist | Nation | Time 200 m | Notes |
|---|---|---|---|---|
| 1 | Eyk Pokorny | Germany | 10.982 | Q |
| 2 | Roberto Chiappa | Italy | | |
| 3 | Jose Moreno | Spain | | |

=== Quarterfinals ===
The eight riders that had advanced to the quarterfinals competed pairwise in four matches. Each match consisted of two races, with a potential third race being used as a tie-breaker if each cyclist won one of the first two races. The winners advanced to the semifinals, with the losers racing in a 5-8 placement race.

==== Quarterfinal 1 ====
| Rank | Cyclist | Nation | Race 1 | Race 2 | Race 3 | Notes |
|---|---|---|---|---|---|---|
| 1 | Gary Neiwand | Australia | 10.794 | 11.091 | — | Q |
| 2 | Eyk Pokorny | Germany | | | — | C |

==== Quarterfinal 2 ====
| Rank | Cyclist | Nation | Race 1 | Race 2 | Race 3 | Notes |
|---|---|---|---|---|---|---|
| 1 | Curt Harnett | Canada | 11.127 | REL | 10.712 | Q |
| 2 | Frédéric Magné | France | | 11.022 | | C |

==== Quarterfinal 3 ====
| Rank | Cyclist | Nation | Race 1 | Race 2 | Race 3 | Notes |
|---|---|---|---|---|---|---|
| 1 | Marty Nothstein | United States | 10.950 | 10.650 | — | Q |
| 2 | Darryn Hill | Australia | | | — | C |

==== Quarterfinal 4 ====
| Rank | Cyclist | Nation | Race 1 | Race 2 | Race 3 | Notes |
|---|---|---|---|---|---|---|
| 1 | Jens Fiedler | Germany | 10.752 | 10.957 | — | Q |
| 2 | Florian Rousseau | France | | | — | C |

=== Semifinals ===
The four riders that had advanced to the semifinals competed pairwise in two matches. Each match consisted of two races, with a potential third race being used as a tie-breaker if each cyclist won one of the first two races. Winners advanced to the finals, losers competed in the bronze medal match.

==== Semifinal 1 ====
| Rank | Cyclist | Nation | Race 1 | Race 2 | Race 3 | Notes |
|---|---|---|---|---|---|---|
| 1 | Jens Fiedler | Germany | 10.618 | 10.974 | — | Q |
| 2 | Gary Neiwand | Australia | | | — | B |

==== Semifinal 2 ====
| Rank | Cyclist | Nation | Race 1 | Race 2 | Race 3 | Notes |
|---|---|---|---|---|---|---|
| 1 | Marty Nothstein | United States | 10.731 | 10.905 | — | Q |
| 2 | Curt Harnett | Canada | | | — | B |

=== Finals ===
==== Classification 5-8 ====
Held 19 September. The 5-8 classification was a single race with all four riders that had lost in the quarterfinals. The winner of the race received 5th place, with the others taking the three following places in order.

| Rank | Cyclist | Nation | Time 200 m |
|---|---|---|---|
| 5 | Darryn Hill | Australia | 11.072 |
| 6 | Frédéric Magné | France | |
| 7 | Eyk Pokorny | Germany | |
| 8 | Florian Rousseau | France | |

==== Bronze medal match ====
The bronze medal match was contested in a set of three races, with the winner of two races declared the winner.

| Rank | Cyclist | Nation | Race 1 | Race 2 | Race 3 |
|---|---|---|---|---|---|
| 3rd place, bronze medalist(s) | Curt Harnett | Canada | 10.947 | 10.949 | — |
| 4 | Gary Neiwand | Australia | | | — |

==== Gold medal match ====
The gold medal match was contested in a set of three races, with the winner of two races declared the winner.

| Rank | Cyclist | Nation | Race 1 | Race 2 | Race 3 |
|---|---|---|---|---|---|
| 1st place, gold medalist(s) | Jens Fiedler | Germany | 10.664 | 11.074 | — |
| 2nd place, silver medalist(s) | Marty Nothstein | United States | | | — |

== Final classification ==
| Rank | Cyclist | Nation |
|---|---|---|
| 1 | Jens Fiedler | Germany |
| 2 | Marty Nothstein | United States |
| 3 | Curt Harnett | Canada |
| 4 | Gary Neiwand | Australia |
| 5 | Darryn Hill | Australia |
| 6 | Frédéric Magné | France |
| 7 | Eyk Pokorny | Germany |
| 8 | Florian Rousseau | France |
| 9 | Pavel Buráň | Czech Republic |
| 10 | Viesturs Bērziņš | Latvia |
| 11 | Roberto Chiappa | Italy |
| 12 | Jose Moreno | Spain |
| 13 | William Clay | United States |
| 14 | George Himonetos | Greece |
| 15 | José Antonio Escuredo | Spain |
| 16 | Labros Vassilopoulus | Greece |
| 17 | Peter Bazálik | Slovakia |
| 18 | Gianluca Capitano | Italy |
| 19 | Jean-Pierre van Zyl | South Africa |
| 20 | Yuichiro Kamiyama | Japan |
| 21 | Gianluca Capitano | Italy |
| 22 | Byung Hyun | South Korea |
| 23 | Darren McKenzie Potter | New Zealand |
| 24 | Claus Martinez Arroyo | Bolivia |
