= 1996 UCI Track Cycling World Cup Classics =

International track cycling competition

The 1996 UCI Track Cycling World Cup Classics is a multi-race tournament over a season of track cycling. The World Cup is organised by the UCI.

== Results ==
=== Men ===
Event	Winner	Second	Third
Colombia, Cali — 10 April
Keirin	Marty Nothstein (USA)	Laurent Gané (FRA)	Federico Paris (ITA)
1 km time trial	José Manuel Moreno (ESP)	Graham Sharman (AUS)	Dimitrios Georgalis (GRE)
Individual pursuit	Juan Martínez Oliver (ESP)	Jérôme Neuville (FRA)	Walter Fernando Pérez (ARG)
Team pursuit	Spain; Juan Llaneras; Adolfo Alperi; Juan Martínez Oliver; Bernando Gonzalez	Argentina; Walter Fernando Pérez; Edgardo Simón; Gonzalo García; Gabriel Curuchet	Colombia; Jhon García; Yovani López; Víctor Herrera; Marlon Pérez
Sprint	Marty Nothstein (USA)	Anthony Peden (AUS)	Sean Eadie (AUS)
Points race	Juan Llaneras (ESP)	Juan Curuchet (ARG)	Marlon Pérez (COL)
Team sprint	Italy	Greece	Russia
Madison	Argentina; Juan Curuchet; Gabriel Curuchet	Switzerland; Hermann Gretener; Alexander Äschbach	Netherlands; Van Hameren; Cornelius Post
Cuba, Havana — 15 April
Keirin	Marty Nothstein (USA)		
1 km time trial	Graham Sharman (AUS)	Herve Robert Thuet (FRA)	Josep Escudero (ESP)
Individual pursuit	Juan Martínez Oliver (ESP)	Graeme Obree (GBR)	
Team pursuit	Spain	Argentina	United States
Sprint	Marty Nothstein (USA)		
Points race	Declan Lonergan (IRL)	Wolfgang Kotzmann (AUT)	Juan Llaneras [ESP]
Madison	Argentina; Juan Curuchet; Gabriel Curuchet		
Greece, Athens — 10–12 May
1 km time trial	Sören Lausberg (GER)		
Individual pursuit	Heiko Szonn (GER)		
Team pursuit	Germany		
Sprint	Curt Harnett (CAN)	Eyk Pokorny (GER)	Pavel Buráň (CZE)
Points race	Juan Llaneras (ESP)	Bruno Risi (SUI)	Andreas Beikirch (GER)
Italy, Busto Garolfo — 20–22 May
Keirin	Marty Nothstein (USA)		
Team pursuit	Russia	Spain	France
Sprint	Curt Harnett (CAN)	Gary Neiwand (AUS)	Roberto Chiappa (ITA)
Germany, Cottbus — June
1 km time trial	Ainārs Ķiksis (LAT)	José Antonio Escuredo (ESP)	Michael Scheurer (GER)
Individual pursuit	Andrea Collinelli (ITA)	Jens Lehmann (GER)	Edouard Gritsoun (RUS)
Team pursuit	Italy	Germany	Great Britain; Chris Newton; Rob Hayles; Matt Illingworth; Bryan Steel
Sprint	Bill Clay (USA)	Ainārs Ķiksis (LAT)	Viesturs Bērziņš (LAT)
Points race	Bruno Risi (SUI)	Juan Llaneras (ESP)	Marco Villa (ITA)
Madison	Netherlands; Peter Pieters; Cornelius Post	Germany; Steffen Blochwitz; Carsten Wolf	Australia; Scott McGrory; Matthew Allen

=== Women ===
Event	Winner	Second	Third
Colombia, Cali — April
500 m time trial	Antonella Bellutti (ITA)	Oksana Grichina (RUS)	Daniela Larreal (VEN)
Sprint	Oksana Grichina (RUS)	Daniela Larreal (VEN)	Galina Enioukhina (RUS)
Individual pursuit	Antonella Bellutti (ITA)	Yoanka González (CUB)	Karen Barrow (AUS)
Points race	Belem Guerrero (MEX)	Jessica Greico (USA)	Daniela Larreal (VEN)
Cuba, Havana — April
500 m time trial	Olga Slyusareva (RUS)		
Sprint	Olga Slyusareva (RUS)		
Greece, Athens — 10–12 May
500m	Félicia Ballanger (FRA)	Oksana Grichina (RUS)	Annett Neumann (GER)
Sprint	Félicia Ballanger (FRA)	Oksana Grichina (RUS)	Annett Neumann (GER)
Individual pursuit	Antonella Bellutti (ITA)	Judith Arndt (GER)	Yvonne McGregor (GBR)
Points race	Nathalie Lancien-Even (FRA)	Zulfià Zabírova (KAZ)	Maureen Kaila Vergara (ESA)
Italy, Busto Garolfo — 20–22 May
Individual pursuit	Marion Clignet (FRA)	Antonella Bellutti (ITA)	Lucy Tyler-Sharman (USA)
Sprint	Félicia Ballanger (FRA)	Michele Ferris (AUS)	Oksana Grichina (RUS)
Germany, Cottbus — June
500m	Félicia Ballanger (FRA)	Oksana Grichina (RUS)	Kathrin Freitag (GER)
Sprint	Félicia Ballanger (FRA)	Oksana Grichina (RUS)	Kathrin Freitag (GER)
Individual pursuit	Jeannie Quigley-Eickhoff (USA)	Rasa Mažeikytė (LTU)	Yoanka González (CUB)
Points race	Nathalie Lancien-Even (FRA)	Jeannie Quigley-Eickhoff (USA)	Rita Mažeikytė (LTU)
