= Cycling at the 2004 Summer Olympics – Men's team sprint =

Cycling at the Olympics

The men's team sprint event in cycling at the 2004 Summer Olympics was contested by twelve teams. The competition took place on 21 August at the Olympic Velodrome at the Athens Olympic Sports Complex.

== Medalists ==
Gold	Silver	Bronze
Germany; Jens Fiedler; Stefan Nimke; René Wolff	Japan; Toshiaki Fushimi; Masaki Inoue; Tomohiro Nagatsuka	France; Mickaël Bourgain; Laurent Gané; Arnaud Tournant

== Results ==
=== Qualifying round ===
The twelve teams of three riders raced the course without competition in the qualifying round. The top eight qualified for the first round, while the bottom four received final rankings based on their times in the qualifying round.

Rank	Team	Riders	Time
1	France	Mickaël Bourgain, Laurent Gané, Arnaud Tournant	44.179 Q
2	Germany	Jens Fiedler, Stefan Nimke, René Wolff	44.251 Q
3	Japan	Toshiaki Fushimi, Masaki Inoue, Tomohiro Nagatsuka	44.355 Q
4	Spain	José Antonio Escuredo, Salvador Meliá, José Antonio Villanueva	44.452 Q
5	Australia	Ryan Bayley, Sean Eadie, Shane Kelly	44.512 Q
6	Netherlands	Jan Bos, Theo Bos, Teun Mulder	44.539 Q
7	Great Britain	Chris Hoy, Craig MacLean, Jamie Staff	44.693 Q
8	Greece	Georgios Cheimonetos, Dimitrios Georgalis, Labros Vasilopoulos	44.986 Q
9	Poland	Rafał Furman, Łukasz Kwiatkowski, Damian Zieliński	45.093
10	Cuba	Reinier Cartaya, Julio César Herrera, Ahmed López	45.548
11	United States	Adam Duvendeck, Giddeon Massie, Christian Stahl	45.742
12	Slovakia	Peter Bazálik, Jaroslav Jeřábek, Ján Lepka	45.978

=== First round ===
In the first round of match competition, teams raced head-to-head. The two fastest winners advanced to the finals, the other two winners competed for the bronze medal and fourth place, and losers received final rankings (fifth through eight places) based on their times in the round. In this round, Great Britain had the second fastest time overall, but lost their match to Germany and therefore did not advance to the medal round.

Heat	Team	Time	Rank
1	Australia	44.320	4
1	Spain	44.687	7
2	Japan	44.081	2
2	Netherlands	44.370	6
3	Germany	43.955	1
3	Great Britain	44.075	5
4	France	44.128	3
4	Greece	45.708	8

=== Medal round ===
Match	Team	Time	Rank
Bronze	France	44.359	3
Bronze	Australia	44.404	4
Gold	Germany	43.980	1
Gold	Japan	44.246	2

=== Final classification ===
The final classification was

1. Germany
2. Japan
3. France
4. Australia
5. Great Britain
6. Netherlands
7. Spain
8. Greece
9. Poland
10. Cuba
11. United States
12. Slovakia
