= Cycling at the 2000 Summer Olympics – Men's sprint =

Cycling at the Olympics

Men's sprint at the Games of the XXVII Olympiad
- Track cycling pictogram
- Venue: Dunc Gray Velodrome
- Dates: 18–20 September
- Competitors: 19 from 14 nations

Medalists
1st place, gold medalist(s)		Marty Nothstein; United States
2nd place, silver medalist(s)		Florian Rousseau; France
3rd place, bronze medalist(s)		Jens Fiedler; Germany

The men's sprint at the 2000 Summer Olympics (Cycling) was an event that consisted of cyclists making three laps around the track. Only the time for the last 200 metres of the 750 metres covered was counted as official time. The races were held on Monday, 18 September, Tuesday, 19 September, and Wednesday, 20 September 2000 at the Dunc Gray Velodrome. There were 19 competitors from 14 nations, with each nation limited to two cyclists. The event was won by Marty Nothstein of the United States, the nation's first victory in the men's sprint since 1984 and second overall. Nothstein was the seventh man to win multiple medals in the event. The silver medal went to Florian Rousseau, France's first medal in the event since 1980. Two-time defending champion Jens Fiedler of Germany lost to Nothstein in the semifinals, but won the bronze medal match to become the second man to win three medals in the event (Daniel Morelon won four from 1964 to 1976, still the record).

== Background ==
This was the 22nd appearance of the event, which has been held at every Summer Olympics except 1904 and 1912. Four of the quarterfinalists from 1996 returned: two-time defending champion Jens Fiedler of Germany, silver medalist Marty Nothstein of the United States, fifth-place finisher Darryn Hill of Australia, and eighth-place finisher Florian Rousseau of France. There was no clear favorite, though Fiedler, Nothstein, and Rousseau were among the top cyclists along with Laurent Gané of France. Rousseau had won the world championships in 1997 and 1998; Gané had won in 1999.

For the first time in the history of the event, no nations made their debut in the men's sprint. France made its 22nd appearance, the only nation to have competed at every appearance of the event.

== Competition format ==
This sprint competition involved a series of head-to-head matches along with the new qualifying round of time trials. There were five main match rounds, with two one-round repechages.

- Qualifying round: Each of the 19 competitors completed a 200-metre flying time trial (reaching full speed before timing started for the last 200 metres). The top 18 advanced to the match rounds, seeded based on their time in the qualifying round. With only 19 riders starting, only the slowest cyclist was eliminated.
- Round 1: The 18 cyclists were seeded into 9 heats of 2 cyclists each. The winner of each heat advanced to the 1/8 finals (9 cyclists) while the other cyclists went to the first repechage (8 cyclists, as one cyclist did not start in round 1).
- First repechage: The 8 cyclists were divided into 3 heats, each with 3 cyclists (except that one had only 2 cyclists because of the non-starter in round 1). The winner of each heat advanced to the 1/8 finals (3 cyclists) while the losers were eliminated (5 cyclists).
- 1/8 finals: The 12 remaining cyclists competed in a 1/8 finals round. There were 6 heats in this round, with 2 cyclists in each. The winner in each heat advanced to the quarterfinals (6 cyclists), while the loser in each heat went to the second repechage (6 cyclists).
- Second repechage: This round featured 2 heats, with 3 cyclists each. The winner of each heat advanced to the quarterfinals (2 cyclists); the losers competed in a ninth-twelfth classification race.
- Quarterfinals: Beginning with the quarterfinals, all matches were one-on-one competitions and were held in best-of-three format. There were 4 quarterfinals, with the winner of each advancing to the semifinals and the loser going to the fifth-eighth classification race.
- Semifinals: The two semifinals provided for advancement to the gold medal final for winners and to the bronze medal final for losers.
- Finals: Both a gold medal final and a bronze medal final were held, as well as a classification final for fifth through eighth places for quarterfinal losers.

== Records ==
The records for the sprint are 200 metre flying time trial records, kept for the qualifying round in later Games as well as for the finish of races.

World record	Curt Harnett (CAN)	9.865	Bogotá, Colombia	28 September 1995
Olympic record	Gary Neiwand (AUS)	10.129	Atlanta, United States	24 July 1996

No new world or Olympic records were set during the competition.

== Schedule ==
All times are Australian Eastern Standard Time (UTC+10)

Date	Time	Round
Monday, 18 September 2000	10:00; 18:00; 18:50; 19:55; 20:45	Qualifying round Round 1 First repechage 1/8 finals Second repechage
Tuesday, 19 September 2000	18:30; 18:50	Classification 9–12; Quarterfinals
Wednesday, 20 September 2000	18:10; 19:10; 19:30; 19:45	Semifinals; Final; Bronze medal match Classification 5–8

== Results ==
=== Qualifying round ===
Held Monday, 18 September. Times and average speeds are listed. The fastest 18 riders advanced to the first round.

Rank	Cyclist	Nation	Time 200 m	Speed km/h	Notes
1	Marty Nothstein	United States	10.166	70.844	Q
2	Laurent Gane	France	10.243	70.292	Q
3	Florian Rousseau	France	10.277	70.059	Q
4	Jens Fiedler	Germany	10.287	69.991	Q
5	Viesturs Bērziņš	Latvia	10.343	69.612	Q
6	Pavel Buráň	Czech Republic	10.370	69.431	Q
7	Craig MacLean	Great Britain	10.459	68.840	Q
8	Sean Eadie	Australia	10.520	68.441	Q
9	Darryn Hill	Australia	10.526	68.402	Q
10	Ján Lepka	Slovakia	10.530	68.378	Q
11	Jan van Eijden	Germany	10.540	68.311	Q
12	Jose Villanueva	Spain	10.556	68.208	Q
13	Tomohiro Nagatsuka	Japan	10.595	67.957	Q
14	Shinichi Ota	Japan	10.603	67.905	Q
15	Anthony Peden	New Zealand	10.649	67.612	Q
16	Nikolaos Angelidis	Greece	10.745	67.008	Q
17	Julio César Herrera	Cuba	10.893	66.097	Q
18	Christian Arrue	United States	10.903	66.037	Q
19	Bartlomiej Saczuk	Poland	11.106	64.830	

=== Round 1 ===
Held Monday, 18 September. The first round consisted of nine heats of two riders each. Winners advanced to the next round, losers competed in the repechage.

==== Heat 1 ====
Rank	Cyclist	Nation	Time 200 m	Speed km/h	Notes
1	Marty Nothstein	United States	10.956	65.717	Q
2	Christian Arrue	United States			R

==== Heat 2 ====
Rank	Cyclist	Nation	Time 200 m	Speed km/h	Notes
1	Laurent Gane	France	11.054	65.135	Q
2	Julio César Herrera	Cuba			R

==== Heat 3 ====
Rank	Cyclist	Nation	Time 200 m	Speed km/h	Notes
1	Florian Rousseau	France	10.865	66.268	Q
2	Nikolaos Angelidis	Greece			R

==== Heat 4 ====
Rank	Cyclist	Nation	Time 200 m	Speed km/h	Notes
1	Jens Fiedler	Germany	wo		Q
2	Anthony Peden	New Zealand	DNS		

==== Heat 5 ====
Rank	Cyclist	Nation	Time 200 m	Speed km/h	Notes
1	Viesturs Bērziņš	Latvia	11.008	65.407	Q
2	Shinichi Ota	Japan			R

==== Heat 6 ====
Rank	Cyclist	Nation	Time 200 m	Speed km/h	Notes
1	Pavel Buráň	Czech Republic	11.102	64.853	Q
2	Tomohiro Nagatsuka	Japan			R

==== Heat 7 ====
Rank	Cyclist	Nation	Time 200 m	Speed km/h	Notes
1	Jose Villanueva	Spain			Q
2	Craig MacLean	Great Britain	REL		R

==== Heat 8 ====
Rank	Cyclist	Nation	Time 200 m	Speed km/h	Notes
1	Jan van Eijden	Germany			Q
2	Sean Eadie	Australia	REL		R

==== Heat 9 ====
Rank	Cyclist	Nation	Time 200 m	Speed km/h	Notes
1	Darryn Hill	Australia	10.938	65.826	Q
2	Jan Lepka	Slovakia			R

=== First repechage ===
Held Monday, 18 September. The nine defeated cyclists from the first round took part in the 1/16 repechage (reduced to eight because of Peden not starting the first round). They raced in three heats of three riders each (with one heat of two riders, as Peden did not qualify for the repechage). The winner of each heat rejoined the nine victors of the first round in advancing to the 1/8 round.

==== First repechage heat 1 ====
Rank	Cyclist	Nation	Time 200 m	Speed km/h	Notes
1	Christian Arrue	United States	11.186	64.366	Q
2	Jan Lepka	Slovakia			
3	Tomohiro Nagatsuka	Japan			

==== First repechage heat 2 ====
Rank	Cyclist	Nation	Time 200 m	Speed km/h	Notes
1	Craig MacLean	Great Britain	10.951	65.747	Q
2	Shinichi Ota	Japan			
3	Julio César Herrera	Cuba			

==== First repechage heat 3 ====
Rank	Cyclist	Nation	Time 200 m	Speed km/h	Notes
1	Sean Eadie	Australia	11.805	60.991	Q
2	Nikolaos Angelidis	Greece			

=== 1/8 finals ===
Held Monday, 18 September. The 1/8 round consisted of six matches, each pitting two of the twelve remaining cyclists against each other. The winners advanced to the quarterfinals, with the losers getting another chance in the 1/8 repechage.

==== 1/8 final 1 ====
Rank	Cyclist	Nation	Time 200 m	Speed km/h	Notes
1	Marty Nothstein	United States	10.799	66.673	Q
2	Sean Eadie	Australia			R

==== 1/8 final 2 ====
Rank	Cyclist	Nation	Time 200 m	Speed km/h	Notes
1	Laurent Gane	France	11.049	65.164	Q
2	Craig MacLean	Great Britain			R

==== 1/8 final 3 ====
Rank	Cyclist	Nation	Time 200 m	Speed km/h	Notes
1	Florian Rousseau	France	10.906	66.019	Q
2	Christian Arrue	United States			R

==== 1/8 final 4 ====
Rank	Cyclist	Nation	Time 200 m	Speed km/h	Notes
1	Jens Fiedler	Germany	10.682	67.403	Q
2	Darryn Hill	Australia			R

==== 1/8 final 5 ====
Rank	Cyclist	Nation	Time 200 m	Speed km/h	Notes
1	Jan van Eijden	Germany	10.682	67.403	Q
2	Viesturs Bērziņš	Latvia			R

==== 1/8 final 6 ====
Rank	Cyclist	Nation	Time 200 m	Speed km/h	Notes
1	Jose Villanueva	Spain	11.382	63.236	Q
2	Pavel Buráň	Czech Republic			R

=== Second repechage ===
Held Monday, 18 September. The six cyclists defeated in the 1/8 round competed in the 1/8 repechage. Two heats of three riders were held. Winners rejoined the victors from the 1/8 round and advanced to the quarterfinals. The four other riders competed in the 9th through 12th place classification.

==== Second repechage heat 1 ====
Rank	Cyclist	Nation	Time 200 m	Speed km/h	Notes
1	Sean Eadie	Australia	11.414	63.080	Q
2	Pavel Buráň	Czech Republic			C
3	Darryn Hill	Australia			C

==== Second repechage heat 2 ====
Rank	Cyclist	Nation	Time 200 m	Speed km/h	Notes
1	Craig MacLean	Great Britain	11.108	64.818	Q
2	Viesturs Bērziņš	Latvia			C
3	Christian Arrue	United States			C

=== Quarterfinals ===
Held Tuesday, 19 September. The eight riders that had advanced to the quarterfinals competed pairwise in four matches. Each match consisted of two races, with a potential third race being used as a tie-breaker if each cyclist won one of the first two races. All four quarterfinals matches were decided without a third race. Winners advanced to the semifinals, losers competed in a 5th to 8th place classification.

==== Quarterfinal 1 ====
Rank	Cyclist	Nation	Race 1	Race 2	Race 3	Notes
1	Marty Nothstein	United States	10.888	10.973	—	Q
2	Craig MacLean	Great Britain			—	C

==== Quarterfinal 2 ====
Rank	Cyclist	Nation	Race 1	Race 2	Race 3	Notes
1	Laurent Gane	France	10.648	10.833	—	Q
2	Sean Eadie	Australia			—	C

==== Quarterfinal 3 ====
Rank	Cyclist	Nation	Race 1	Race 2	Race 3	Notes
1	Florian Rousseau	France	10.744	10.781	—	Q
2	José Antonio Villanueva	Spain			—	C

==== Quarterfinal 4 ====
Rank	Cyclist	Nation	Race 1	Race 2	Race 3	Notes
1	Jens Fiedler	Germany	10.966	10.904	—	Q
2	Jan van Eijden	Germany			—	C

=== Semifinals ===
Held Wednesday, 20 September. The four riders that had advanced to the semifinals competed pairwise in two matches. Each match consisted of two races, with a potential third race being used as a tie-breaker if each cyclist won one of the first two races. Winners advanced to the finals, losers competed in the bronze medal match.

==== Semifinal 1 ====
Rank	Cyclist	Nation	Race 1	Race 2	Race 3	Notes
1	Marty Nothstein	United States	10.930	10.903	—	Q
2	Jens Fiedler	Germany			—	B

==== Semifinal 2 ====
Rank	Cyclist	Nation	Race 1	Race 2	Race 3	Notes
1	Florian Rousseau	France		10.877	11.536	Q
2	Laurent Gane	France	10.822			B

=== Finals ===
Held Wednesday, 20 September, except for the classification 9–12.

==== Classification 9-12 ====
Held 19 September. The 9-12 classification was a single race with all four riders that had lost in the 1/8 repechage taking place. The winner of the race received 9th place, with the others taking the three following places in order.

Rank	Cyclist	Nation	Time 200 m	Speed km/h
9	Pavel Buráň	Czech Republic	11.078	64.994
10	Viesturs Bērziņš	Latvia		
11	Christian Arrue	United States		
—	Darryn Hill	Australia	DNS	

==== Classification 5-8 ====
Held Wednesday, 20 September. The 5-8 classification was a single race with all four riders that had lost in the quarterfinals taking place. The winner of the race received 5th place, with the others taking the three following places in order.

Rank	Cyclist	Nation	Time 200 m	Speed km/h
5	Jan van Eijden	Germany	11.040	65.217
6	Jose Villanueva	Spain		
7	Sean Eadie	Australia		
8	Craig MacLean	Great Britain		

==== Bronze medal match ====
The bronze medal match was contested in a set of three races, with the winner of two races declared the winner.

Rank	Cyclist	Nation	Race 1	Race 2	Race 3
3rd place, bronze medalist(s)	Jens Fiedler	Germany	10.732	10.918	—
4	Laurent Gane	France			—

==== Gold medal match ====
The gold medal match was contested in a set of three races, with the winner of two races declared the winner.

Rank	Cyclist	Nation	Race 1	Race 2	Race 3
1st place, gold medalist(s)	Marty Nothstein	United States	10.874	11.066	—
2nd place, silver medalist(s)	Florian Rousseau	France			—

== Final classification ==
Rank	Cyclist	Nation
1st place, gold medalist(s)	Marty Nothstein	United States
2nd place, silver medalist(s)	Florian Rousseau	France
3rd place, bronze medalist(s)	Jens Fiedler	Germany
4	Laurent Gane	France
5	Jan van Eijden	Germany
6	Jose Villanueva	Spain
7	Sean Eadie	Australia
8	Craig MacLean	Great Britain
9	Pavel Buráň	Czech Republic
10	Viesturs Bērziņš	Latvia
11	Christian Arrue	United States
12	Darryn Hill	Australia
13	Jan Lepka	Slovakia
14	Tomohiro Nagatsuka	Japan
15	Shinichi Ota	Japan
16	Nikolaos Angelidis	Greece
17	Julio César Herrera	Cuba
18	Anthony Peden	New Zealand
19	Bartlomiej Saczuk	Poland
