= Cycling at the 2004 Summer Olympics – Men's keirin =

Cycling at the Olympics

The men's Keirin in cycling at the 2004 Summer Olympics was contested by 22 cyclists. A Keirin race consisted of eight laps of the track, or 2 kilometres.

== Medalists ==
Gold	Silver	Bronze
Ryan Bayley (AUS)	José Antonio Escuredo (ESP)	Shane Kelly (AUS)

== Results ==
=== First round ===
The 22 cyclists competed in three heats of seven to eight riders each. The top two riders in each heat (six overall) advanced to the next round, while the other sixteen cyclists competed in the first repechage.

Heat 1
Place	Name	Nation
1	Ryan Bayley	Australia
2	Labros Vasilopoulos	Greece
3	Jamie Staff	Great Britain
4	Łukasz Kwiatkowski	Poland
5	Theo Bos	Netherlands
6	Toshiaki Fushimi	Japan
7	Jens Fiedler	Germany

Heat 2
Place	Name	Nation
1	René Wolff	Germany
2	José Antonio Escuredo	Spain
3	Marty Nothstein	United States
4	Jeroslav Jerobek	Slovakia
5	Josiah Ng	Malaysia
6	Laurent Gané	France
7	Yang Hee-Chun	South Korea

Heat 3
Place	Name	Nation
1	Shane Kelly	Australia
2	Ivan Vrba	Czech Republic
3	Teun Mulder	Netherlands
4	José Alberto Sochón	Guatemala
5	Ross Edgar	Great Britain
6	Hong Suk-Hwan	South Korea
7	Mickaël Bourgain	France
REL	José Antonio Villanueva	Spain

==== First repechage ====
The first round repechage consisted of three heats of five to six riders each. The top two cyclists in each of the heats rejoined the winners from the first round in advancing to the second round. The rest were eliminated from competition.

Heat 1
Place	Name	Nation
1	Jamie Staff	Great Britain
2	Jens Fiedler	Germany
3	José Antonio Villanueva	Spain
4	Ross Edgar	Great Britain
5	Jeroslav Jerobek	Slovakia
6	Laurent Gané	France

Heat 2
Place	Name	Nation
1	Mickaël Bourgain	France
2	Josiah Ng	Malaysia
3	Jose Sochon	Guatemala
4	Marty Nothstein	United States
5	Toshiaki Fushimi	Japan

Heat 3
Place	Name	Nation
1	Theo Bos	Netherlands
2	Łukasz Kwiatkowski	Poland
3	Hong Suk-Hwan	South Korea
4	Teun Mulder	Netherlands
5	Yang Hee-Chun	South Korea

=== Second round ===
The second round consisted of two heats, with the twelve cyclists split into groups of six. The top three riders in each heat advanced to the final, while the bottom three in each heat competed in the classification race for seventh to twelfth places.

Heat 1
Place	Name	Nation
1	Ryan Bayley	Australia
2	Josiah Ng	Malaysia
3	José Antonio Escuredo	Spain
4	Ivan Vrba	Czech Republic
5	Łukasz Kwiatkowski	Poland
REL	Jamie Staff	Great Britain

Heat 2
Place	Name	Nation
1	Shane Kelly	Australia
2	René Wolff	Germany
3	Mickaël Bourgain	France
4	Jens Fiedler	Germany
DNF	Theo Bos	Netherlands
REL	Labros Vasilopoulos	Greece

==== Classification 7-12 ====
Place	Name	Nation
1	Łukasz Kwiatkowski	Poland
2	Jens Fiedler	Germany
3	Labros Vasilopoulos	Greece
REL	Ivan Vrba	Czech Republic
DNS	Theo Bos	Netherlands
DNS	Jamie Staff	Great Britain

=== Final ===
Final results
Place	Name	Nation
1	Ryan Bayley	Australia
2	José Antonio Escuredo	Spain
3	Shane Kelly	Australia
DNF	Mickaël Bourgain	France
REL	René Wolff	Germany
REL	Josiah Ng	Malaysia
