= Manuel Méndez =

Manuel Méndez may refer to:

- Manuel Méndez (sailor), Puerto Rican Olympic sailor
- Manuel Méndez (politician), vice president of El Salvador
- Manuel Méndez Ballester, Puerto Rican writer
