= Musto Skiff World Championship =

World Championship in the Musto Skiff Class

The Musto Skiff World Championship is an annual international sailing regatta for Musto Skiff they are organized by the host club on behalf of the International Musto Skiff Class Association and recognized by World Sailing, the sports IOC recognized governing body.

== Events ==
Edition			Host			Participant					Ref.
No.	Date	Year	Host club	Location	Nat.	No.	Nat.	Cont			Ref.
1	18-23 Jun	2007	Fraglia Vela Malcesine	Malcesine, Lake Garda	Italy	86	13	3			
2	24-30 Aug	2008	Segel Club St. Moritz	St. Moritz	Switzerland	53	10	2			
N/A		2009	NOT HELD								
N/A		2010	NOT HELD								
3	8-16 Jan	2011	Black Rock Yacht Club	Black Rock, Victoria	Australia	42	8	2			
4	23-30 Jun	2012	Weymouth and Portland National Sailing Academy	Isle of Portland	United Kingdom	105	11	2			
N/A		2013	NOT HELD								
5	5-9 Jan	2015	Mounts Bay Sailing Club, Australia	Crawley, Perth. WA	Australia	35	5	2			
6	15-19 Sep	2015	Fraglia Vela Riva	Lake Garda	Italy	90	11	3			
7	7-11 Jun	2016	Yacht Club de Carnac	Carnac	France	73	10	4			
8	27 May -3 Jun	2017	Club Nàutic S’Arenal	Palma, Majorca	Spain	61	12	4			
9	5-14 Jan	2018	Blairgowrie Yacht Squadron	Blairgowrie, Victoria	Australia	53	5	2			
10	6-13 Jun	2019	Royal Yacht Club Hollandia / Regatta Center Medemblik	Medemblik	Netherlands	91	10	3			
N/A	Sep	2020	Ekernforde Yacht Club	Eckernförde	Germany	Cancelled due to COVID					
N/A	25Sep -2Oct	2021	Circolo Vela Torbole	Nago–Torbole, Lake Garda	Italy	Cancelled due to COVID					
11	21-26 Jun	2022	Kieler Woche	Kiel	Germany	44	7	2	43	1	
12	15-21 Jul	2023	Circolo Vela Torbole	Lake Garda	Italy	53	7	2	13	0	
13	15-21 Jul	2024	Weymouth and Portland National Sailing Academy	Portland	United Kingdom	73	9	3	72	1	
14	2-10 Jan	2025	Woollahra Sailing Club	Rose Bay, Sydney	Australia	39	7	3	39	0	
15	8-12 June	2026	Yacht Club de Carnac	Carnac, Morbihan, Brittany	France	37	8	4	35	2	

== Multiple World Champions ==
Compiled from the data below the table includes up to and including 2022.

Ranking	Sailor	Gold	Silver	Bronze	Total	No. Entries"	Ref.
1	Bruce Keen (GBR)	3	2	0	5	7	
2	Jon Newman (AUS)	2	2	0	4	6	
3	Richard Stenhouse (GBR)	2	1	0	3	5	

== Medalists ==
Year	Gold	Silver	Bronze	Ref.
2007	Richard Stenhouse (GBR)	Ian Turnbull (GBR)	Ian Trotter (GBR)	
2008	Richard Stenhouse (GBR)	Roger Oswald (SUI)	Graeme Oliver (GBR)	
2011	Daniel Henderson (GBR)	Bruce Keen (GBR)	Markus Hamilton (AUS)	
2012	Bruce Keen (GBR)	Richard Stenhouse (GBR)	Tom Wright (GBR)	
2014	Jon Newman (AUS)	Marcus Hamilton (AUS)	Thor Schoenhoff (AUS)	
2015	Bruce Keen (GBR)	Jon Newman (AUS)	Dan Trotter (GBR)	
2016	Andi Lachenschmid (GER)	George Hand (GBR)	Dave Poston (GBR)	
2017	Frithjof Schwerdt (GER)	Bruce Keen (GBR)	Andy Tarboton (RSA)	
2018	Jon Newman (AUS)	Will Phillips (AUS)	Jamie Hilton (GBR)	
2019	Bruce Keen (GBR)	Jon Newman (AUS)	George Hand (GBR)	
2020	Cancelled COVID-19			
2021	Cancelled COVID-19			
2022	Rick Peacock (GBR)	Andy Tarboton (RSA)	Peter Greenhalgh (GBR)	
2023	Matthias Houvenagel (AUS)	Sam Pascoe (GBR)	Bill Maughan (GBR)	
2024	Sam Pascoe (GBR)	Robert Richardson (GBR)	Daniel Boatman (GBR)	
2025	Andy Tarboton (RSA) (GBR)	Robert Richardson (GBR)	Jon Newman (AUS)	
2026	Robert Richardson (GBR)	Eddie Bridle (GBR)	Ben Glegg (GBR)	
