= Dumitru Frățilă =

Dumitru Frățilă may refer to:

- Dumitru Frățilă (skier)
- Dumitru Frățilă (sailor)
