= Geoffrey Taylor (sailor) =

Fijian sailor

Personal information
- Nationality: Fijian
- Born: 22 April 1950 (age 75) Sydney, Australia

Sport
- Sport: Sailing

Geoffrey Taylor (born 22 April 1950) is a Fijian sailor. He competed in the Finn event at the 1996 Summer Olympics.
