= Will Martin (sailor) =

American sailor

Personal information
- Born: April 29, 1970 (age 56) Charleston, South Carolina, United States

Sport
- Sport: Sailing

Will Martin (born April 29, 1970) is an American sailor. He competed in the Finn event at the 1996 Summer Olympics.
