= Christian Arrue =

American cyclist (born 1969)

Personal information
- Nickname: Chelly
- Nationality: American
- Born: 8 January 1969 (age 57) Santiago, Chile

Sport
- Country: United States
- Sport: Cycling
Medal record
Representing Chile
Pan American Games
Silver medal – second place	1995 Mar del Plata	Individual sprint
Representing United States
Pan American Games
Gold medal – first place	1999 Winnipeg	Team sprint
Silver medal – second place	1999 Winnipeg	Individual sprint

Christian Marcelo "Chelly" Arrue (born 8 January 1969) is an American cyclist. He competed at the 2000 Summer Olympics in Sydney, in the men's sprint and Men's keirin. Arrue was born in Santiago, Chile. He became an American citizen in 1996.
