= Rafał Furman =

Polish cyclist

Personal information
- Born: 18 July 1985 (age 41) Kołobrzeg, Poland

Cycling career
- Sport: Cycling

Rafał Furman (born 18 July 1985) is a Polish cyclist. He competed in the men's team sprint at the 2004 Summer Olympics.
