= Masaki Inoue =

Japanese cyclist (born 1979)

Personal information
- Born: July 25, 1979 (age 47) Nagasaki, Japan

Cycling career
- Sport: Cycling
- Disciplines: Track; Keirin
Medal record
Representing Japan
Men's track cycling
Olympic Games
Silver medal – second place	2004 Athens	Team sprint

Masaki Inoue (井上昌己, Inoue Masaki; born July 25, 1979) is a Japanese cyclist. He won the silver medal in the Men's team sprint in the 2004 Summer Olympics along with Toshiaki Fushimi and Tomohiro Nagatsuka. In Japan, he is mostly known as a keirin cyclist. In 2008, he won the Keirin Grand Prix and was the year's top money winner.
