= Reinier Cartaya =

Cuban cyclist

Personal information
- Born: 22 January 1981 (age 45)

Cycling career
- Sport: Cycling
Medal record
Representing Cuba
Pan American Games
Gold medal – first place	2003 Santo Domingo	Team pursuit

Reinier Cartaya Jorge (born 22 January 1981) is a Cuban cyclist. He competed in the men's team sprint at the 2004 Summer Olympics.
