= Claus Martínez =

Bolivian cyclist

Claus Martínez (Klaus Martínez)
Personal information
- Born: 18 December 1975 (age 50)

Cycling career
- Sport: Cycling

Claus Martínez (Klaus Martínez), born 18 December 1975 is a Bolivian cyclist. He competed in the men's sprint at the 1996 Summer Olympics.
