= Yuriy Tokovy =

Ukrainian sailor

Personal information
- Nationality: Ukrainian
- Born: 10 March 1964 (age 61); Kyiv, Ukrainian SSR, Soviet Union

Sport
- Sport: Sailing

Yuriy Tokovy (born 10 March 1964) is a Ukrainian sailor. He competed in the Finn event at the 1996 Summer Olympics.
