= Bartłomiej Saczuk =

Polish cyclist

Personal information
- Born: 10 October 1979 (age 47) Olsztyn, Poland

Cycling career
- Sport: Cycling

Bartłomiej Saczuk (born 10 October 1979) is a Polish cyclist. He competed in the men's sprint at the 2000 Summer Olympics.
