= Sailing at the 1996 Summer Olympics – Finn =

Sailing at the Olympics

Finn Men's at the Games of the XXVI Olympiad
- Finn class dinghy
- Venue: Savannah
- Dates: 22 July to 2 August
- Competitors: 31 from 31 nations
- Teams: 31

Medalists
1st place, gold medalist(s)		Mateusz Kusznierewicz	Poland
2nd place, silver medalist(s)		Sébastien Godefroid	Belgium
3rd place, bronze medalist(s)		Roy Heiner	Netherlands

The Finn Men's Competition was a sailing event on the program at the 1996 Summer Olympics that was held from 22 July to 2 August 1996 in Savannah, Georgia, United States. Points were awarded for placement in each race. Eleven races were scheduled. Ten races were sailed. Each sailor had two discards.

This was the last time that a British sailor did not win this event.

== Results ==
Rank	Helmsman (Country)	Race I		Race II		Race III		Race IV		Race V		Race VI		Race VII		Race VIII		Race IX		Race X		Total Points	Total -1
Rank	Helmsman (Country)	Rank	Points	Rank	Points	Rank	Points	Rank	Points	Rank	Points	Rank	Points	Rank	Points	Rank	Points	Rank	Points	Rank	Points	Total Points	Total -1
1st place, gold medalist(s)	Mateusz Kusznierewicz (POL)	~~10~~	~~10.0~~	4	4.0	~~20~~	~~20.0~~	4	4.0	9	9.0	1	1.0	2	2.0	1	1.0	1	1.0	10	10.0	62.0	32.0
2nd place, silver medalist(s)	Sebastien Godefroid (BEL)	13	13.0	~~24~~	~~24.0~~	5	5.0	5	5.0	4	4.0	3	3.0	~~16~~	~~16.0~~	7	7.0	2	2.0	6	6.0	85.0	45.0
3rd place, bronze medalist(s)	Roy Heiner (NED)	~~21~~	~~21.0~~	7	7.0	6	6.0	11	11.0	6	6.0	11	11.0	1	1.0	~~12~~	~~12.0~~	6	6.0	2	2.0	83.0	50.0
4	Hans Spitzauer (AUT)	4	4.0	1	1.0	10	10.0	7	7.0	11	11.0	4	4.0	5	5.0	~~PMS~~	~~32.0~~	~~12~~	~~12.0~~	12	12.0	98.0	54.0
5	Fredrik Lööf (SWE)	8	8.0	3	3.0	1	1.0	6	6.0	14	14.0	~~19~~	~~19.0~~	11	11.0	11	11.0	~~15~~	~~15.0~~	3	3.0	91.0	57.0
6	Paul McKenzie (AUS)	9	9.0	~~28~~	~~28.0~~	14	14.0	~~20~~	~~20.0~~	1	1.0	17	17.0	13	13.0	3	3.0	3	3.0	7	7.0	115.0	67.0
7	Jose Maria van der Ploeg (ESP)	1	1.0	8	8.0	15	15.0	~~DNS~~	~~32.0~~	~~17~~	~~17.0~~	8	8.0	15	15.0	6	6.0	11	11.0	5	5.0	118.0	69.0
8	Ian Ainslie (RSA)	~~25~~	~~25.0~~	10	10.0	7	7.0	2	2.0	10	10.0	10	10.0	14	14.0	2	2.0	~~26~~	~~26.0~~	17	17.0	123.0	72.0
9	Richard Clarke (CAN)	14	14.0	6	6.0	3	3.0	10	10.0	~~PMS~~	~~32.0~~	~~28~~	~~28.0~~	3	3.0	17	17.0	21	21.0	1	1.0	135.0	75.0
10	Christoph Bergmann (BRA)	19	19.0	2	2.0	9	9.0	1	1.0	5	5.0	~~20~~	~~20.0~~	8	8.0	~~21~~	~~21.0~~	19	19.0	16	16.0	120.0	79.0
11	Jali Mäkilä (FIN)	~~17~~	~~17.0~~	5	5.0	12	12.0	9	9.0	3	3.0	~~22~~	~~22.0~~	7	7.0	16	16.0	13	13.0	21	21.0	125.0	82.0
12	Richard Stenhouse (GBR)	18	18.0	14	14.0	8	8.0	~~21~~	~~21.0~~	8	8.0	12	12.0	~~20~~	~~20.0~~	4	4.0	8	8.0	11	11.0	124.0	83.0
13	Craig Monk (NZL)	22	22.0	9	9.0	4	4.0	13	13.0	2	2.0	13	13.0	18	18.0	5	5.0	~~28~~	~~28.0~~	~~25~~	~~25.0~~	139.0	86.0
14	Michael Maier (CZE)	3	3.0	15	15.0	17	17.0	18	18.0	~~19~~	~~19.0~~	~~29~~	~~29.0~~	12	12.0	8	8.0	5	5.0	8	8.0	134.0	86.0
15	Philippe Presti (FRA)	6	6.0	13	13.0	~~19~~	~~19.0~~	3	3.0	13	13.0	15	15.0	6	6.0	~~19~~	~~19.0~~	18	18.0	13	13.0	125.0	87.0
16	Luca Devoti (ITA)	7	7.0	~~25~~	~~25.0~~	21	21.0	15	15.0	18	18.0	9	9.0	9	9.0	~~PMS~~	~~32.0~~	7	7.0	4	4.0	147.0	90.0
17	Yuriy Tokovy (UKR)	2	2.0	~~20~~	~~20.0~~	~~22~~	~~22.0~~	14	14.0	16	16.0	5	5.0	17	17.0	9	9.0	10	10.0	18	18.0	133.0	91.0
18	Oleg Khoperskiy (RUS)	~~27~~	~~27.0~~	18	18.0	13	13.0	16	16.0	7	7.0	~~27~~	~~27.0~~	25	25.0	10	10.0	4	4.0	14	14.0	161.0	107.0
19	Karlo Kuret (CRO)	~~DSQ~~	~~32.0~~	11	11.0	2	2.0	19	19.0	12	12.0	23	23.0	~~24~~	~~24.0~~	18	18.0	9	9.0	15	15.0	165.0	109.0
20	Michael Fellmann (GER)	15	15.0	12	12.0	11	11.0	17	17.0	15	15.0	~~26~~	~~26.0~~	~~26~~	~~26.0~~	15	15.0	14	14.0	22	22.0	173.0	121.0
21	Bjørn Westergaard (DEN)	12	12.0	16	16.0	~~25~~	~~25.0~~	8	8.0	23	23.0	14	14.0	4	4.0	~~PMS~~	~~32.0~~	22	22.0	23	23.0	179.0	122.0
22	Vasco Batista (POR)	16	16.0	~~23~~	~~23.0~~	23	23.0	22	22.0	~~26~~	~~26.0~~	7	7.0	22	22.0	14	14.0	16	16.0	9	9.0	178.0	129.0
23	Will Martin (USA)	~~PMS~~	~~32.0~~	22	22.0	18	18.0	12	12.0	21	21.0	2	2.0	~~PMS~~	~~32.0~~	25	25.0	17	17.0	19	19.0	200.0	136.0
24	John Driscoll (IRL)	23	23.0	19	19.0	16	16.0	~~24~~	~~24.0~~	20	20.0	21	21.0	10	10.0	13	13.0	~~24~~	~~24.0~~	20	20.0	190.0	142.0
25	Marek Valášek (SVK)	5	5.0	17	17.0	26	26.0	~~28~~	~~28.0~~	~~27~~	~~27.0~~	6	6.0	23	23.0	20	20.0	25	25.0	26	26.0	203.0	148.0
26	Farkas Litkey (HUN)	11	11.0	~~29~~	~~29.0~~	24	24.0	23	23.0	22	22.0	~~25~~	~~25.0~~	19	19.0	22	22.0	20	20.0	24	24.0	219.0	165.0
27	Aimilios Papathanasiou (GRE)	26	26.0	21	21.0	~~DNF~~	~~32.0~~	27	27.0	~~PMS~~	~~32.0~~	16	16.0	21	21.0	23	23.0	29	29.0	DNF	32.0	259.0	195.0
28	Dumitru Frățilă (ROM)	20	20.0	26	26.0	~~27~~	~~27.0~~	25	25.0	24	24.0	24	24.0	27	27.0	26	26.0	27	27.0	~~28~~	~~28.0~~	254.0	199.0
29	Mark Clarke (CAY)	~~28~~	~~28.0~~	27	27.0	28	28.0	26	26.0	25	25.0	18	18.0	28	28.0	~~PMS~~	~~32.0~~	23	23.0	27	27.0	262.0	202.0
30	Manuel Méndez (PUR)	24	24.0	~~30~~	~~30.0~~	30	30.0	29	29.0	28	28.0	30	30.0	29	29.0	~~DSQ~~	~~32.0~~	31	31.0	29	29.0	292.0	229.0
31	Geoffrey Taylor (FIJ)	29	29.0	~~31~~	~~31.0~~	29	29.0	30	30.0	~~DNF~~	~~32.0~~	31	31.0	30	30.0	24	24.0	30	30.0	30	30.0	296.0	233.0

=== Daily standings ===
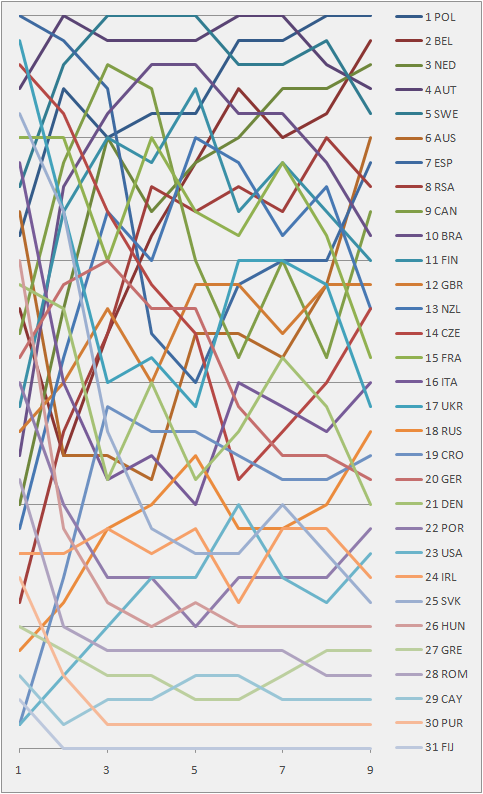
Graph showing the daily standings in the Finn during the 1996 Summer Olympics

== Conditions at the Finn course area's ==
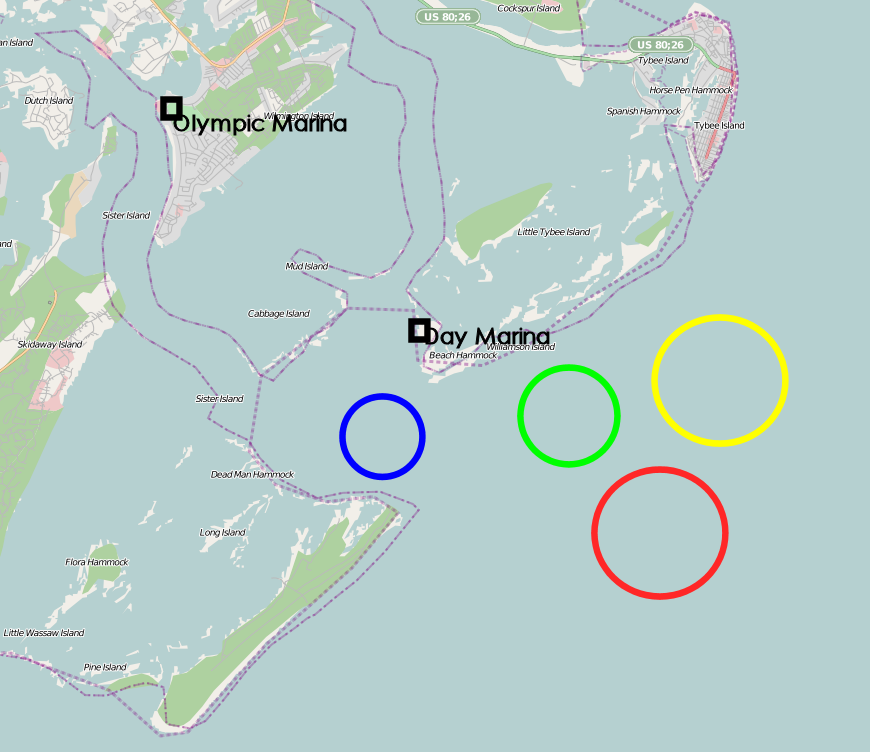
Black: Marinas
Blue: Alpha course
Green: Bravo course
Yellow: Charly course
Red: Delta course

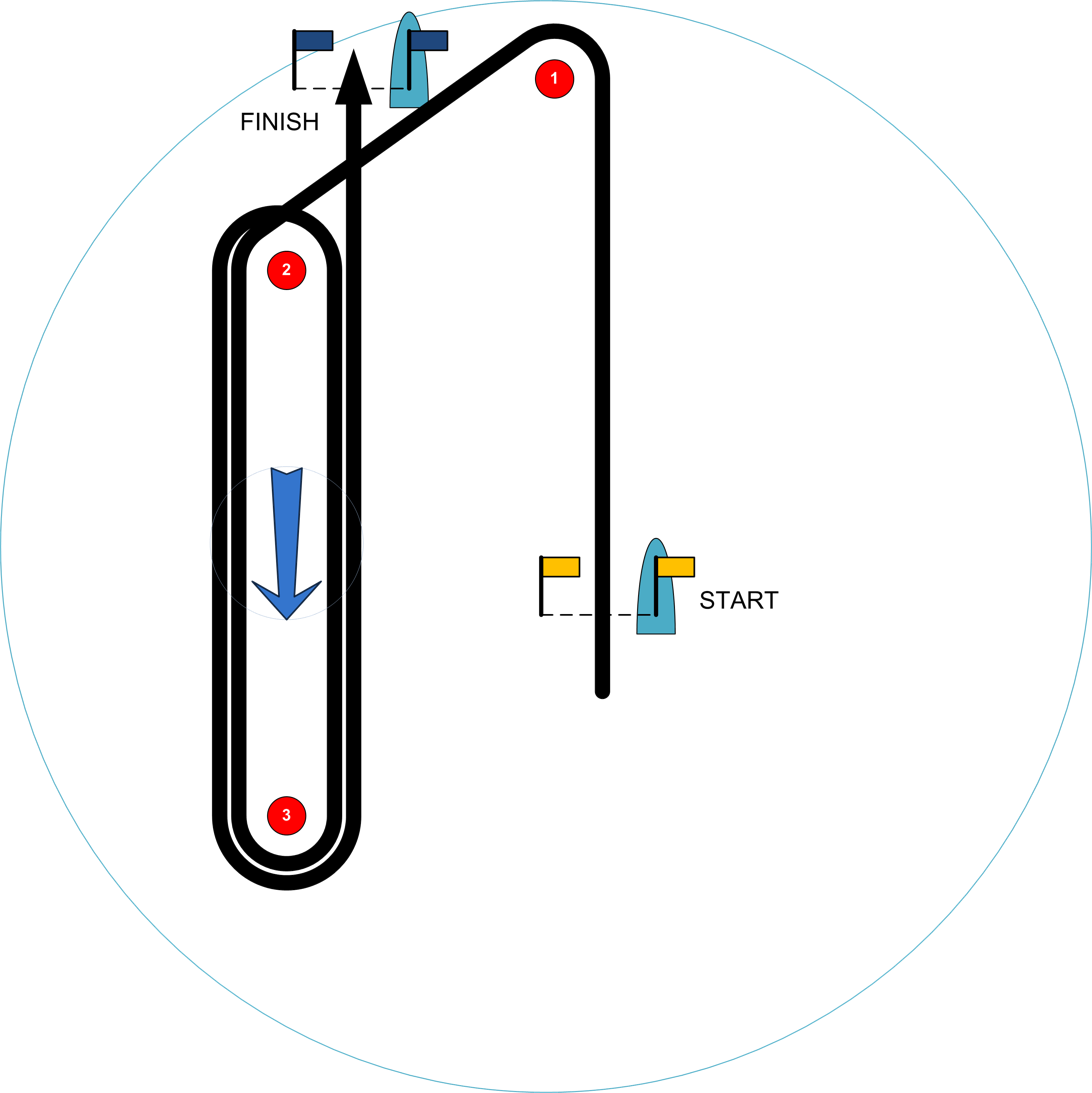
Olympic course ZU.
S(Start) - 1 - 2 - 3 - 2 - 3 - F(Finish reaching)

Date	Race	°C	Knot	Meter	Course	Course area
22 July 1996	I	30	7	0.4	ZU	Charly
23 July 1996	II	29	10	0.8	ZU	Charly
23 July 1996	III	29	13	0.8	ZU	Charly
24 July 1996	IV	28	11	0.7	ZU	Delta
25 July 1996	V	29	13	0.7	ZU	Delta
26 July 1996	VI	28	4	0.4	ZU	Charly
26 July 1996	VII	27	10	0.5	ZU	Charly
27 July 1996	VIII	28	5	0.6	ZU	Charly
28 July 1996	IX	29	6	0.7	ZU	Charly
29 July 1996	X	28	11	0.6	ZU	Charly
