= Nikolaos Angelidis =

Greek cyclist (born 1977)

Personal information
- Born: 22 January 1977 (age 49) Athens, Greece

Cycling career
- Sport: Cycling

Nikolaos Angelidis (born 22 January 1977) is a Greek cyclist. He competed in the men's sprint at the 2000 Summer Olympics.
