= Vasco Batista =

Portuguese sailor

Personal information
- Nationality: Portuguese
- Born: 27 March 1974 (age 51); Portugal

Sport
- Sport: Sailing

Vasco Batista (born 27 March 1974) is a Portuguese sailor. He competed in the Finn event at the 1996 Summer Olympics.
