= José Alberto Sochón =

Guatemalan cyclist

Personal information
- Born: 27 August 1980 (age 46)

Cycling career
- Sport: Cycling
Medal record
Representing Guatemala
Pan American Games
Bronze medal – third place	2003 Santo Domingo	Keirin
Central American and Caribbean Games
Gold medal – first place	2006 Cartagena	Keirin
Bronze medal – third place	2010 Mayaguez	Keirin

José Alberto Sochón (born 27 August 1980) is a Guatemalan cyclist. He competed in the men's keirin at the 2004 Summer Olympics.
