= Manuel Méndez (sailor) =

Puerto Rican sailor

Personal information
- Nationality: Puerto Rican
- Born: 10 June 1962 (age 62)

Sport
- Sport: Sailing

Manuel Méndez (born 10 June 1962) is a Puerto Rican sailor. He competed in the Finn event at the 1996 Summer Olympics.
