= Marek Valášek =

Slovak sailor

Personal information
- Nationality: Slovak
- Born: 12 June 1973 (age 51); Trnava, Czechoslovakia

Sport
- Sport: Sailing

Marek Valášek (born 12 June 1973) is a Slovak sailor. He competed in the Finn event at the 1996 Summer Olympics.
