= Tomohiro Nagatsuka =

Japanese Olympic cyclist (born 1978)

Personal information
- Born: November 28, 1978 (age 47) Ibaraki, Japan

Cycling career
- Sport: Cycling
- Discipline: Track
Medal record
Representing Japan
Men's track cycling
Olympic Games
Silver medal – second place	2004 Athens	Team sprint

Tomohiro Nagatsuka (長塚智広, Nagatsuka Tomohiro; born November 28, 1978) is a Japanese cyclist. He won the silver medal in the Men's team sprint in the 2004 Summer Olympics along with Toshiaki Fushimi and Masaki Inoue. In Japan, he is mostly known as a keirin cyclist.
