= Richard Stenhouse =

British sailor

Personal information
- Nationality: British
- Born: 8 May 1966 (age 58); Leicester, England

Sport
- Sport: Sailing
- Club: Rutland Sailing Club; Market Bosworth RYC

Richard Stenhouse (born 8 May 1966) is a British sailor. He competed in the Finn event at the 1996 Summer Olympics.
