= Darren McKenzie-Potter =

New Zealand cyclist

Personal information
- Born: 16 October 1969 (age 57) Auckland, New Zealand

Cycling career
- Sport: Cycling

Darren McKenzie-Potter (born 16 October 1969) is a New Zealand cyclist. He competed in two events at the 1996 Summer Olympics.
