= William Clay (cyclist) =

American cyclist

Personal information
- Born: December 27, 1973 (age 52) Yokosuka, Japan

Cycling career
- Sport: Cycling

William Clay (born December 27, 1973) is an American cyclist. He competed in the men's sprint at the 1996 Summer Olympics.
