= Toshiaki Fushimi =

Japanese cyclist (1976–2026)

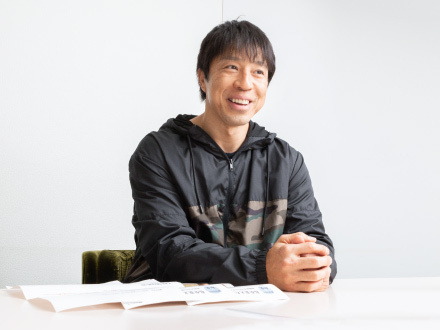
- Fushimi in 2020

Personal information
- Born: February 4, 1976 Shirakawa, Fukushima, Japan
- Died: July 19, 2026 (aged 50) Matsusaka, Mie, Japan

Cycling career
- Sport: Cycling
- Discipline: Track
- Role: Rider
- Rider type: Sprinter
Medal record
Representing Japan
Men's track cycling
Olympic Games
Silver medal – second place	2004 Athens	Team sprint

Toshiaki Fushimi (伏見俊昭, Fushimi Toshiaki; February 4, 1976 – July 19, 2026) was a Japanese cyclist. He won the Silver Medal in the Men's team sprint in the 2004 Summer Olympics along with Masaki Inoue and Tomohiro Nagatsuka. In Japan, he is mostly known as a keirin cyclist, with over 400 victories.

Fushimi died on July 19, 2026, at the age of 50, following an accident during a keirin race in Japan.
