= Dumitru Frățilă (sailor) =

Romanian sailor (born 1961)

Personal information
- Nationality: Romanian
- Born: 7 December 1961 (age 63)

Sport
- Sport: Sailing

Dumitru Frățilă (born 7 December 1961) is a Romanian sailor. He competed in the Finn event at the 1996 Summer Olympics.
