= Anthony Peden =

New Zealand cyclist

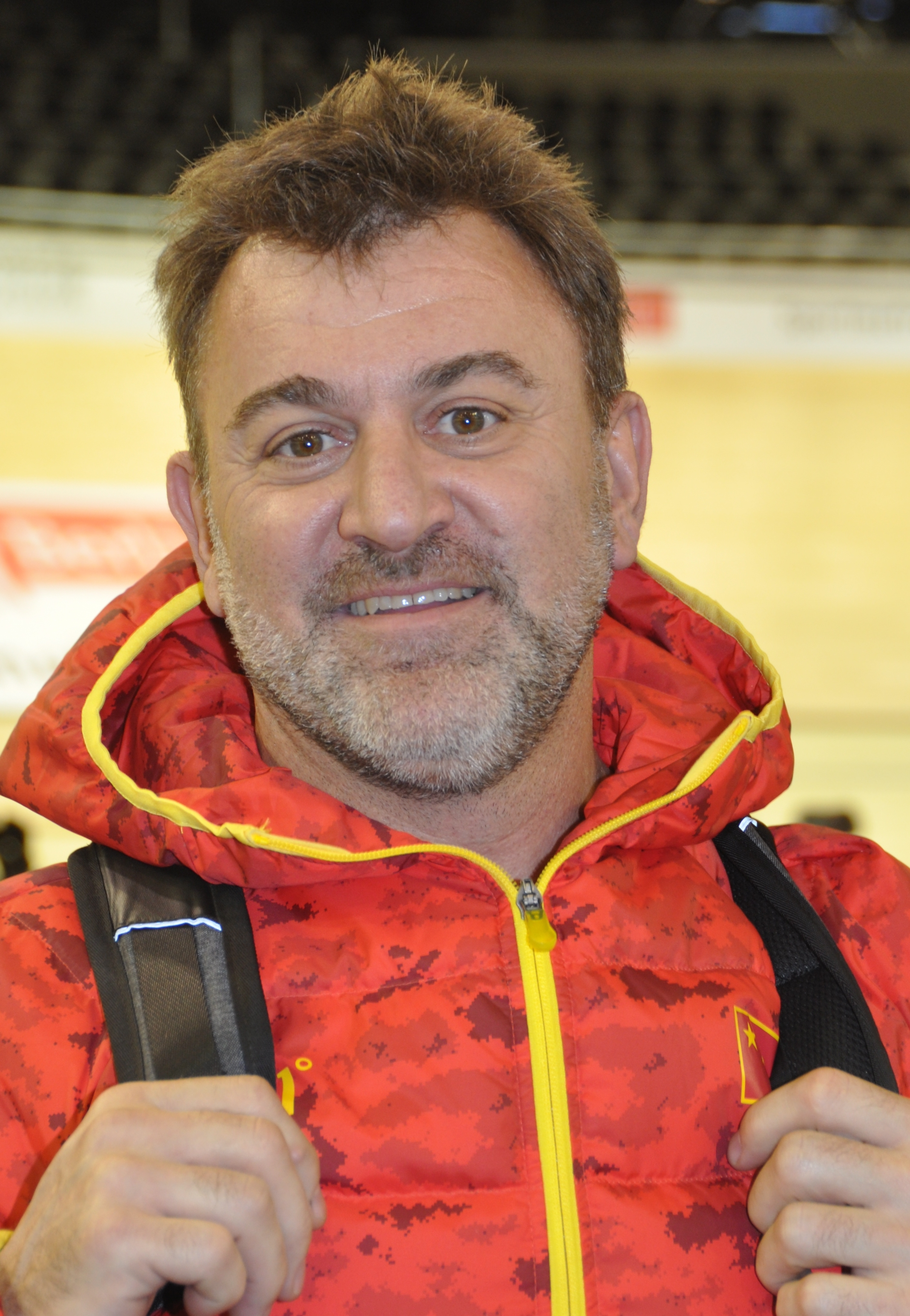
- Peden in 2018

Personal information
- Born: 15 September 1970 (age 55)

Sport
- Country: New Zealand
- Sport: Cycling
Medal record
Men's track cycling
Representing New Zealand
World Championships
Silver medal – second place	1999 Berlin	Keirin

Anthony Peden (born 15 September 1970) is a New Zealand cyclist. He competed at the 2000 Summer Olympics in Sydney, in the Men's keirin and the men's sprint. Peden was the head sprint coach at Cycling New Zealand from 2013 until his resignation in 2018. His resignation prompted an independent review of bullying allegations within Cycling New Zealand. The Heron report found that Peden had an inappropriate personal relationship with a female athlete and was involved in "numerous instances of bullying" while sprint coach. Peden is now the Head Sprint Coach of the Chinese National track cycling team.

Peden won the coach of the year award at the 2014 Halberg Awards.

== Personal life ==
In 2011 he married Nicholle Bailey in Copenhagen. Despite that, while engaged as a coach, Peden had an extra-marital affair with one of the team's athletes.
