= Martin Hrbáček =

Slovak cyclist

Personal information
- Born: 12 October 1970 (age 56) Bratislava, Czechoslovakia

Cycling career
- Sport: Cycling

Martin Hrbáček (born 12 October 1970) is a Slovak cyclist. He competed in the men's sprint at the 1996 Summer Olympics.
