= Gonzalo García (cyclist) =

Argentine cyclist

Personal information
- Born: 9 June 1976 (age 50)

Cycling career
- Sport: Cycling
Medal record
Representing Argentina
Pan American Games
Bronze medal – third place	1999 Winnipeg	Team pursuit

Gonzalo García Martín (born 9 June 1976) is an Argentine cyclist. He competed at the 1996 Summer Olympics and the 2000 Summer Olympics.
