= Eyk Pokorny =

German cyclist (born 1969)

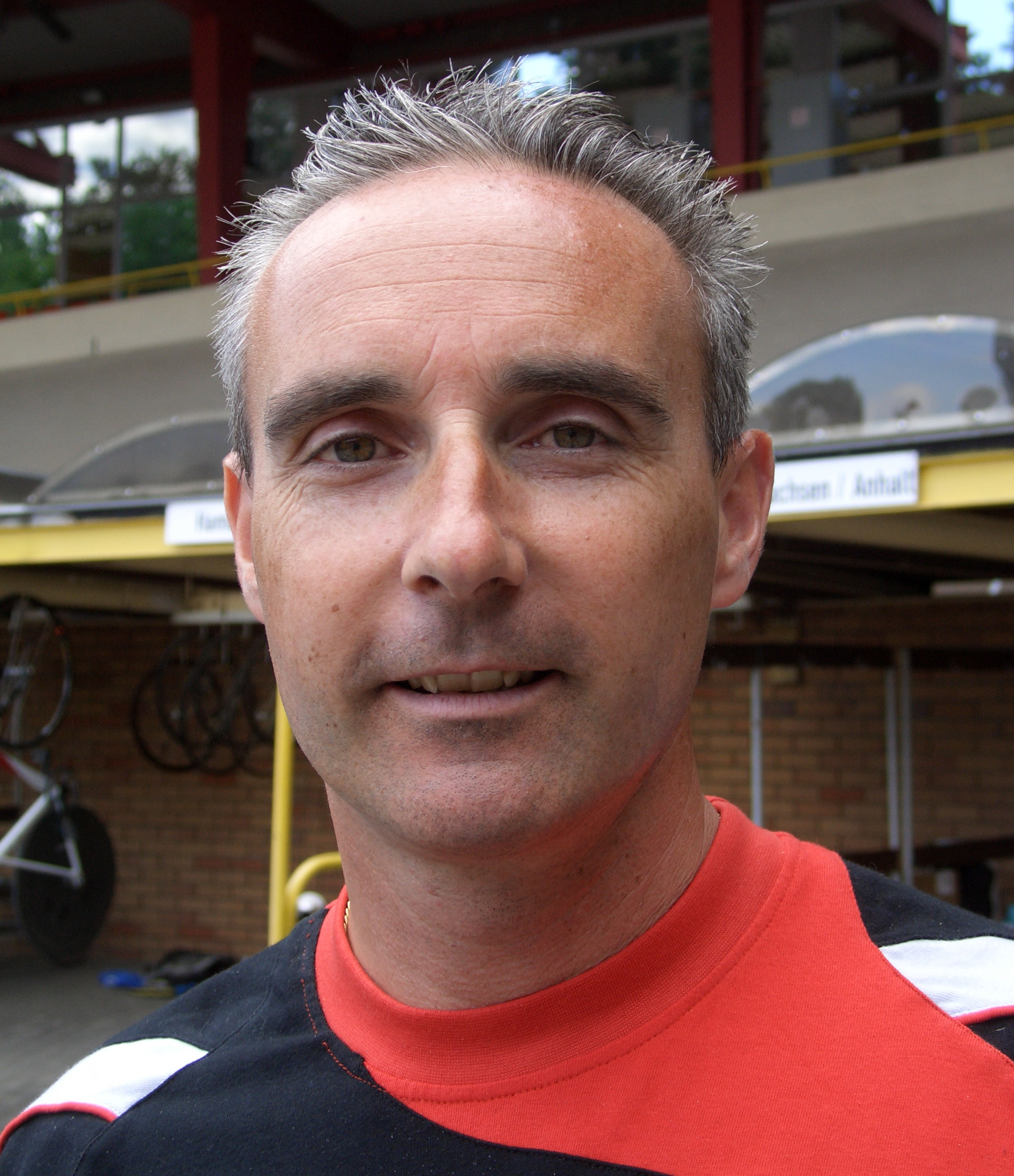
- Eyk Pokorny in 2010

Personal information
- Born: 22 November 1969 (age 56) Berlin, Germany

Cycling career
- Sport: Cycling
- Current team: Retired
- Discipline: Track
- Role: Rider

Professional team
- 1997–1999: XXL Erdgas
Medal record
Representing Germany
Men's track cycling
World Championships
| Gold medal – first place | 1991 Stuttgart | Tandem |
| Silver medal – second place | 1997 Perth | Team sprint |
| Bronze medal – third place | 1993 Hamar | Sprint |
| Bronze medal – third place | 1998 Bordeaux | Team sprint |
| Bronze medal – third place | 1999 Berlin | Team sprint |

Eyk Pokorny (born 22 November 1969) is a German cyclist. He competed in the men's sprint at the 1996 Summer Olympics.

== Major results ==
1991
1st Tandem, UCI Amateur World Championships (with Emanuel Raasch)
1993
2nd Sprint, National Track Championships
3nd Sprint, UCI World Championships
1994
2nd Sprint, National Track Championships
1995
2nd Sprint, National Track Championships
1996
2nd Sprint, National Track Championships
1997
1st Omnium sprint, European Track Championships
National Track Championships

1st Sprint
1st Team sprint (with Jan van Eijden and Sören Lausberg)

2nd Team sprint, UCI World Championships
1998
National Track Championships

2nd Sprint
2nd Team sprint

3rd Team sprint, UCI World Championships
1999
National Track Championships

1st Team sprint (with Jan van Eijden and Jens Fiedler)
2nd Sprint

3rd Team sprint, UCI World Championships
2000
3rd Sprint, National Track Championships
2001
National Track Championships

1st Team sprint (with Sören Lausberg and Jens Fiedler)
2nd Sprint
3rd Keirin
