= Gianluca Capitano =

Italian cyclist

Personal information
- Born: 4 August 1971 (age 55) Chieti, Italy

Cycling career
- Sport: Cycling

Gianluca Capitano (born 4 August 1971) is an Italian cyclist. He competed in two events at the 1996 Summer Olympics.
