= Marty Nothstein =

American Olympic cyclist

- Born: Martin Wayne Nothstein; February 10, 1971 (age 55); Allentown, Pennsylvania, U.S.
- Cycling career
- Height: 6 ft 2 in (188 cm)
- Weight: 212 lb (96 kg)
- Sport: Cycling
- Disciplines: Track & Road
- Role: Rider
- Rider type: Sprinter

Professional teams
- 2001: Mercury–Viatel
- 2002–2006: Navigators
Medal record
Men's track cycling
Representing the United States
Olympic Games
Gold medal – first place	2000 Sydney	Sprint
Silver medal – second place	1996 Atlanta	Sprint
World Championships
Gold medal – first place	1994 Palermo	Keirin
Gold medal – first place	1994 Palermo	Sprint
Gold medal – first place	1996 Manchester	Keirin
Silver medal – second place	1996 Manchester	Sprint
Bronze medal – third place	1995 Bogota	Team sprint
Bronze medal – third place	1997 Perth	Keirin

Martin Wayne Nothstein (born February 10, 1971) is an American former professional road bicycle racer and track cyclist. He is a three-time world champion in track events and an Olympic gold and silver medalist. Nothstein also served as a Lehigh County Commissioner and ran unsuccessfully as the Republican Party nominee for the 2018 United States House of Representatives election in Pennsylvania's 7th congressional district and 2018 Pennsylvania's 7th and 15th congressional district special elections.

== Early life and education ==
Nothstein was born in Allentown, Pennsylvania, on February 10, 1971, one of five children to Gail Benner Nothstein and Wayne Nothstein, owner of Nothstein Motors, a local automotive business. Nothstein's paternal great grandfather was an accomplished bicycle racer and bare-knuckle prizefighter.

Nothstein attended Emmaus High School in Emmaus, Pennsylvania, where he graduated in 1989, and then Penn State University.

== Cycling career ==
Nothstein began cycling in 1987 and made his international debut in 1989 at UCI Track Cycling World Championships in Lyon, France. Nothstein won his first world championship medal in 1993, winning silver in the keirin. He became a double world champion in 1994, winning both sprint and keirin events at the 1994 World Championships while nursing a broken heel bone. Nothstein again rode with a fractured bone, his kneecap, as part of the U.S. sprint team that won the bronze medal at the 1995 World Championships.

Nothestein represented the United States in the 1996 Summer Olympics in Atlanta, where he won the silver medal in the cycling spring. Four years later, at the 2000 Summer Olympics in Sydney, he became the first American cyclist in 16 years to win an Olympic Games gold medal, winning the Olympics' cycling sprint.

In March 2001, he turned professional with the U.S.-based Mercury Viatel team. In 2002 he moved to the Navigators Insurance Cycling Team, where he remained for four years until ending his career in 2006.

In 2004, in order to transfer to road riding, he lost 30 pounds compared to normal weight at the 2000 Summer Olympics.

== Post-cycling career ==
Nothstein retired from competitive cycling after the 2006 season and drove the NHRA Top Alcohol Funny Car for Follow A Dream.

Nothstein won two races in the 2007 NHRA Lucas Oil Drag Racing Series season. The first was at Bradenton Motorsports Park in Bradenton, Florida in the series’ season opener. The second was in mid-July at Gateway International Raceway in Madison, Illinois. He finished 11th in points in the 2007 NHRA Alcohol Funny Car season.

=== Legal issues ===
In 2017, Nothstein was living in Lowhill Township, Pennsylvania and working as executive director of the Valley Preferred Cycling Center. The following year, in 2018, he was terminated from Valley Preferred Cycling Center following allegations of sexual misconduct during his tenure.

In November 2020, U.S. District Judge Edward G. Smith dismissed Nothstein’s lawsuit against USA Cycling over its disclosure of a sexual misconduct allegation against him. Smith also held that the decision to suspend Nothstein’s license to compete as a cyclist and place him on a list of suspended riders was within its responsibilities under the federal law that created the United States Center for SafeSport. In April 2021 Nothstein dropped his appeal of the judge's decision.

In December 2021, Nothstein was arrested in Allentown and charged with two counts of stalking and defiant trespass, and a single count of criminal trespass. He pled guilty to these counts in February 2023.

In March 2024, Northstein was once more charged with Stalking, Criminal Mischief and damage to property. Bail was set at $100,000.

== 2018 U.S. House campaign ==
In October 2017 Nothstein announced that he would seek the Republican nomination for Pennsylvania's 7th congressional district for the 2018 United States House of Representatives elections prior to the announcement by the district's Republican incumbent, Charlie Dent, that he would not run for another term. He lost his bid for Congress in the 7th District to Democrat Susan Wild, receiving 43.5% of the vote.

Nothstein also ran in special election for Dent's former seat in Pennsylvania's 15th congressional district. Nothstein was defeated by Wild in this election as well, receiving 129,593 votes to Wild's 130,353 votes.

== Major achievements ==
World Championships
3-Gold Medals – Keirin (1996), Sprint and Keirin (1994)
2-Silver Medals – Match Sprint (1996), Keirin (1993)
2-Bronze Medals – Keirin, (1997), Team Sprint (1995)
U.S. National Championships
34-Gold Medals

1993
2nd Keirin, Track Cycling World Championships

1994
1st Keirin, Track Cycling World Championships
1st Sprint, Track Cycling World Championships

1995
1st Sprint, Pan American Games
1st Sprint, Round 6, Manchester, 1995 Track World Cup
2nd Keirin, Round 6, Manchester, 1995 Track World Cup

1996
1st Keirin, Track Cycling World Championships
2nd Sprint, Track Cycling World Championships
2nd Sprint, Olympic Games
1st Sprint, Round 1, Cali, 1996 Track World Cup
1st Keirin, Round 1, Cali, 1996 Track World Cup
1st Sprint, Round 2, Havanna, 1996 Track World Cup
1st Keirin, Round 2, Havanna, 1996 Track World Cup
1st Sprint, Round 4, Italy, 1996 Track World Cup
1st Keirin, Round 4, Italy, 1996 Track World Cup

1997
3rd Keirin, World Track Cycling Championships
1st Sprint, Round 1, Cali, 1997 Track World Cup
1st Keirin, Round 1, Cali, 1997 Track World Cup
1st Sprint, Round 2, Trexlertown, 1997 Track World Cup
2nd Keirin, Round 2, Trexlertown, 1997 Track World Cup
1st Sprint, Round 3, Fiorenzuola, 1997 UCI Track Cycling World Cup Classics
3rd Sprint, Round 4, Quatro Sant’Elana, 1997 Track World Cup
1st Keirin, Round 4, Quatro Sant’Elana, 1997 Track World Cup
1st Keirin, Round 6, Adelaide, 1997 Track World Cup

1998
2nd Sprint, Round 1, Cali, 1998 Track World Cup
3rd Keirin, Round 1, Cali, 1998 Track World Cup
2nd Keirin, Round 2, Victoria, 1998 Track World Cup

1999
1st Keirin, Pan American Games
1st Sprint, Pan American Games
1st Team Sprint, Pan American Games
1st (United States) Keirin, US National Track Championships

2000
1st Sprint, Olympic Games
1st (United States) Keirin, US National Track Championships
1st (United States) Sprint, US National Track Championships
1st (United States) Team sprint, US National Track Championships

2001
2nd Kilo, Round 3, Italy, UCI Track Cycling World Cup Classics
3rd Keirin, Round 3, Italy, UCI Track Cycling World Cup Classics
3rd Keirin, Round 5, Malaysia, UCI Track Cycling World Cup Classics
3rd Scratch Race, Goodwill Games
1st (United States) Kilo, US National Track Championships
1st (United States) Sprint, US National Track Championships
1st (United States) Keirin, US National Track Championships

2002
1st (United States) Scratch Race, US National Track Championships
1st Brick City Classic (USA)
1st Six Days of Moscow (RUS)

2003
1st (United States) Keirin, US National Track Championships
1st (United States) Team sprint, US National Track Championships
1st New York City Cycling Championship (USA)
1st Air Products Finals (Track) (USA)

2004
U.S. Olympic Track Cycling Team member
1st (United States) Keirin, US National Track Championships
1st Wells Fargo Twilight Criterium (USA)
1st Sprint, Tour of Connecticut (USA)
1st Commerce Bank Criterium (USA)
1st Paul Heller Memorial (USA)
1st Battle of Brilliance Criterium (USA)
1st Team Sprint, USA Track Cup
1st Keirin, USA Track Cup
2nd Stage 2, Nature Valley Grand Prix (USA)
3rd Tour de Gastown (CAN)
3rd Bike Jam 2004 (USA)
3rd Bristol Mountain Road Race (USA)

2005
1st Tour de Christiana (USA)
1st Silver Spring G.P. Criterium (USA)
1st Harrisburg Criterium (USA)
1st CTS Westfield Criterium (USA)
1st St. Valentine's Day Massacre (USA)
1st El Cajon Downtown G.P. (USA)
3rd D.A.R.E. Grand Prix (USA)

== See also ==
- List of World Championship medalists in men's keirin
