= Ján Lepka =

Slovak cyclist

Personal information
- Born: 3 January 1977 (age 49) Plzeň, Czechoslovakia

Cycling career
- Sport: Cycling

Ján Lepka (born 3 January 1977) is a Slovak cyclist. He competed at the 2000 Summer Olympics and the 2004 Summer Olympics.
