= Georgios Cheimonetos =

Greek cyclist (born 1972)

Personal information
- Born: 29 December 1972 (age 53) Rhodes, Greece

Cycling career
- Sport: Cycling

Georgios Cheimonetos (born 29 December 1972) is a Greek former cyclist. He competed at the 1996 Summer Olympics and the 2004 Summer Olympics.
