= Lambros Vasilopoulos =

Greek cyclist (born 1972)

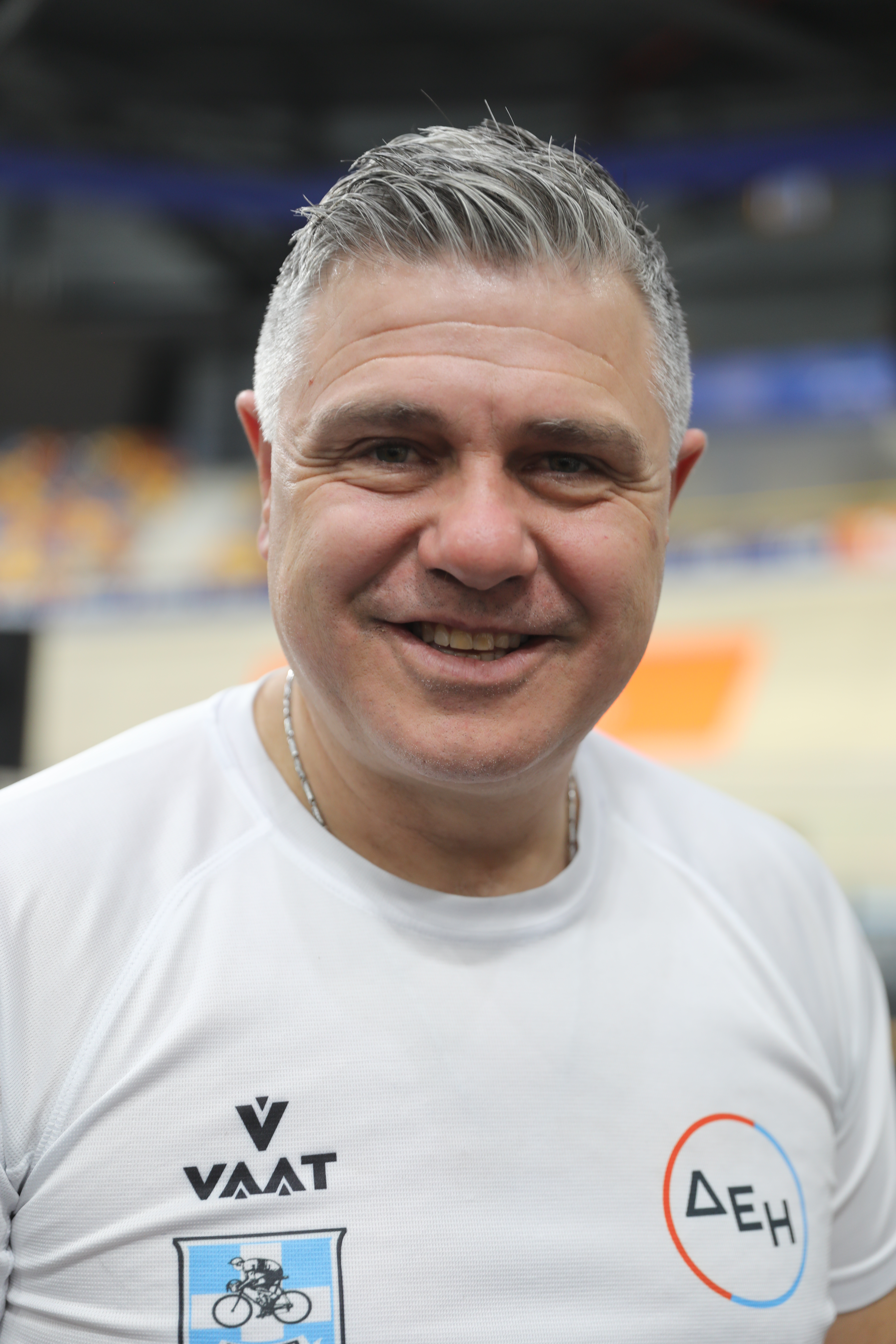
- Lambros Vasilopoulos (2024)

Personal information
- Born: 25 March 1973 (age 53) Patras, Greece

Cycling career
- Sport: Cycling

Lambros Vasilopoulos (born 25 March 1973) is a Greek cyclist. He competed at the 1996 Summer Olympics, the 2000 Summer Olympics and the 2004 Summer Olympics.
