= Curt Harnett =

Canadian cyclist (born 1965)

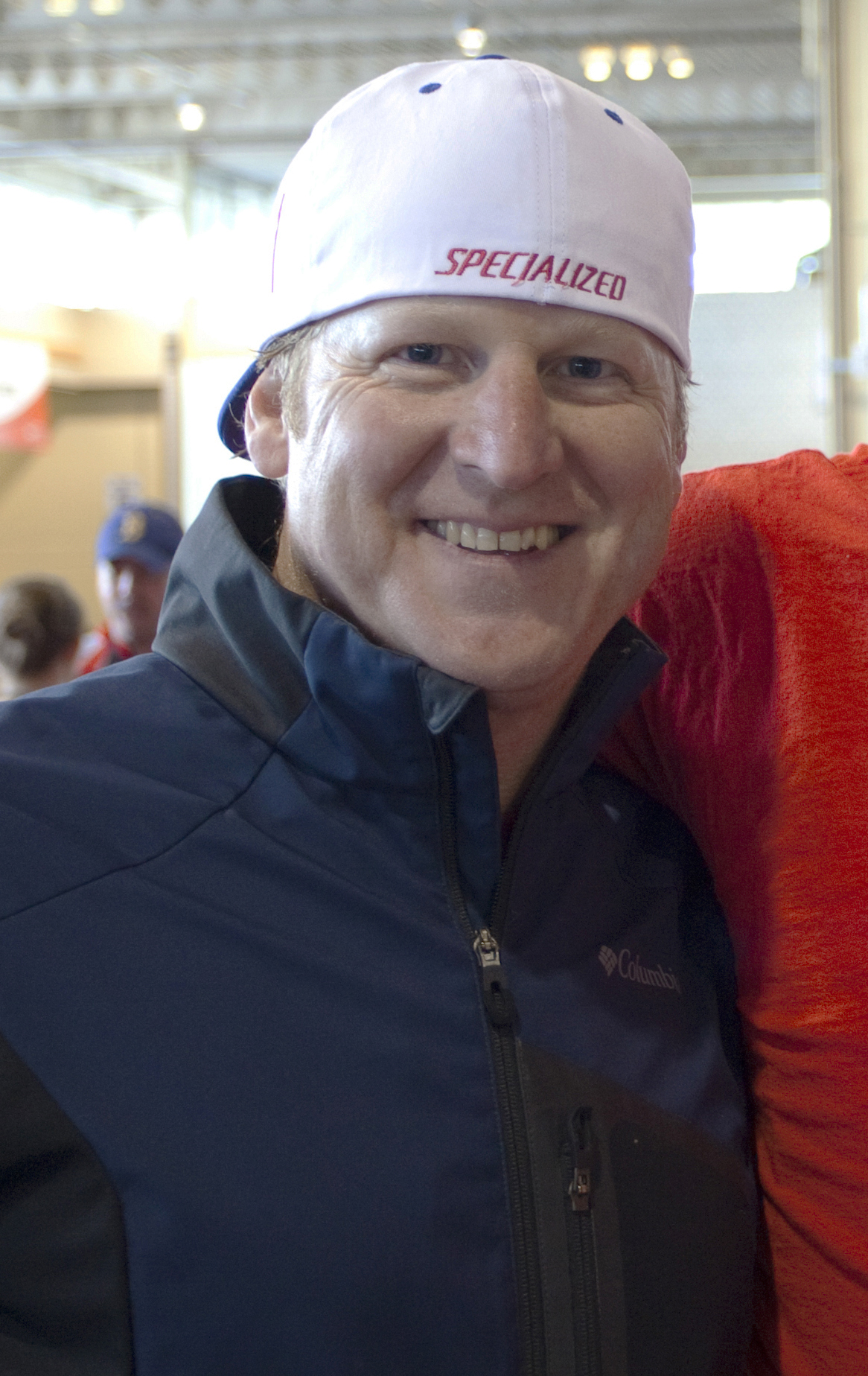
- Harnett in 2010

Personal information
- Born: May 14, 1965 (age 61) Toronto, Ontario, Canada

Cycling career
- Sport: Cycling
Medal record
Men's cycling
Representing Canada
Olympic Games
| Silver medal – second place | 1984 Los Angeles | 1 km time trial |
| Bronze medal – third place | 1992 Barcelona | Sprint |
| Bronze medal – third place | 1996 Atlanta | Sprint |
UCI Track World Championships
| Silver medal – second place | 1990 Maebashi | Sprint |
| Silver medal – second place | 1995 Bogota | Sprint |
Commonwealth Games
| Silver medal – second place | 1990 Auckland | Match Sprint |
| Silver medal – second place | 1994 Victoria | Match Sprint |
Pan American Games
| Gold medal – first place | 1987 Indianapolis | 1000m Time Trial |
| Bronze medal – third place | 1987 Indianapolis | Match Sprint |

Curtis "Curt" Melvin Harnett, CM (born May 14, 1965) is a Canadian racing cyclist. He began cycling as a way to stay in shape for hockey. He competed in four Olympic Games, winning three medals, one silver and two bronze.

Harnett also has three medals from the Commonwealth Games and three medals from the Pan American Games. He held the world record for the 200 metre time trial for 11 years, bested in 2006 by Dutchman Theo Bos. After retiring from cycling in 1996, he attended the Sydney and Athens Olympic Games as a commentator for CBC Sports.

He was inducted into Canada's Sports Hall of Fame in 2005. Harnett was introduced into the Lehigh Valley Velodrome Cycling Hall of Fame. He was the chef de mission for Team Canada at the 2015 Pan American Games and the 2016 Summer Olympics. In 2018, Harnett was made a Member of the Order of Canada.

== Quotes ==
- "It's time to get a haircut and get a real job." – After competing in his final Olympic Games. Harnett was noted for his distinctive long, very curly blond hair and even did a TV commercial for a shampoo.

Records
| Preceded by Vladimir Adamachvili | Men's 200 meter Time Trial; World Record Holder; September 28, 1995 – December 16, 2006 | Succeeded by Theo Bos |
