= Pavel Buráň =

Czech cyclist (born 1973)

Personal information
- Born: 25 April 1973 (age 53) Brno, Czechoslovakia

Cycling career
- Sport: Cycling
- Discipline: Track
- Role: Rider
- Rider type: Sprinter
Medal record
Representing Czech Republic
Men's track cycling
World Championships
Bronze medal – third place	2000 Manchester	Keirin

Pavel Buran (born 25 April 1973) is a Czech former professional track cyclist. A multiple medalist at the European Championships, Buran won a bronze medal in the Keirin in 2000. As a junior, he is reputed to have done a track stand in the sprint event which lasted so long, the UCI introduced time limits for which riders were allowed to remain stationary during the event.

== Palmarès ==
1990
2nd Sprint, UCI Track World Championships, Middlesbrough - Juniors

1991
2nd Sprint, UCI Track World Championships - Juniors
2nd Tandem, UCI Track World Championships, Stuttgart - Amateurs

1992
2nd Tandem, UCI Track World Championships, Valencia - Amateurs

1998
3rd European Track Championships, Omnium, Sprint

1999
2nd European Track Championships, Omnium, Sprint

2000
3rd, Keirin, Track World Championships, Manchester

2001
1st European Track Championships, Omnium, Sprint, Brno

2002
2nd European Track Championships, Omnium, Sprint, Buttgen
3rd Team Pursuit, European Track Championships, Buttgen

2003
3rd Sprint, European Track Championships, Omnium, Moscow
2nd Sprint, Moscow

2004
3rd Sprint, European Track Championships, Omnium, Valencia
3rd Keirin, Moscow

2005
3rd Keirin, Sydney
