= Peter Bazálik =

Slovak cyclist (born 1975)

Personal information
- Born: 14 June 1975 (age 51) Banská Štiavnica, Czechoslovakia

Cycling career
- Sport: Cycling

Peter Bazálik (born 14 June 1975) is a Slovak cyclist. He competed at the 1996 Summer Olympics, the 2000 Summer Olympics and the 2004 Summer Olympics.
