= José Manuel Moreno (cyclist) =

Spanish cyclist

Personal information
- Born: 7 May 1969 (age 57) Amsterdam, Netherlands

Cycling career
- Sport: Cycling
- Discipline: Track
- Role: Rider
- Rider type: Sprinter

Professional team
- 1994–1995: Kelme–Avianca–Gios
Medal record
Men's track cycling
Representing Spain
Olympic Games
Gold medal – first place	1992 Barcelona	1 km time trial
UCI Amateur World Championships
Gold medal – first place	1991 Stuttgart	1 km time trial

José Manuel Moreno Periñán (born 7 May 1969) is a Spanish former cyclist and Olympic Champion. Moreno won the gold medal at the 1992 Olympic Games in Barcelona, for the Men's 1.000m Time Trial.
