= Viesturs Bērziņš =

Latvian cyclist

Personal information
- Born: 9 April 1974 (age 52) Riga, Latvia

Cycling career
- Sport: Cycling

Viesturs Bērziņš (born 9 April 1974) is a Latvian cyclist. He competed at the 1996 Summer Olympics and the 2000 Summer Olympics.
