= José Antonio Escuredo =

Spanish cyclist

Personal information
- Full name: José Antonio Escuredo Raimondez
- Born: 19 January 1970 (age 56) Spain

Cycling career
- Sport: Cycling
- Discipline: Track
- Role: Rider
Medal record
Olympic Games
Silver medal – second place	2004 Athens	Keirin
World Championships
Silver medal – second place	2006 Bordeaux	Keirin
Silver medal – second place	2004 Melbourne	Keirin
Silver medal – second place	2004 Melbourne	Team Sprint
Bronze medal – third place	2000 Manchester	Team Sprint
Track World Championships
Bronze medal – third place	2016 Montichiari	Tandem B sprint

José Antonio Escuredo Raimondez (born 19 January 1970 in Girona) is a former Spanish racing cyclist, specialising in track cycling. He has won three silver and one bronze world championship medals and a silver medal at the 2004 Summer Olympics. Escuredo has also won ten titles at the Spanish national track cycling championships. Escuredo mostly competed in the keirin and team sprint events.
