= List of tennis venues =

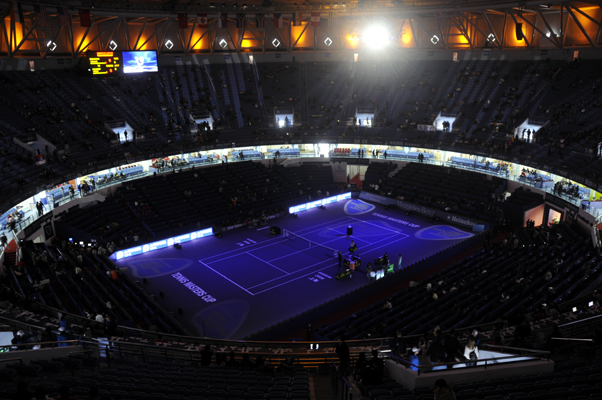
Qizhong Forest Sports City Arena

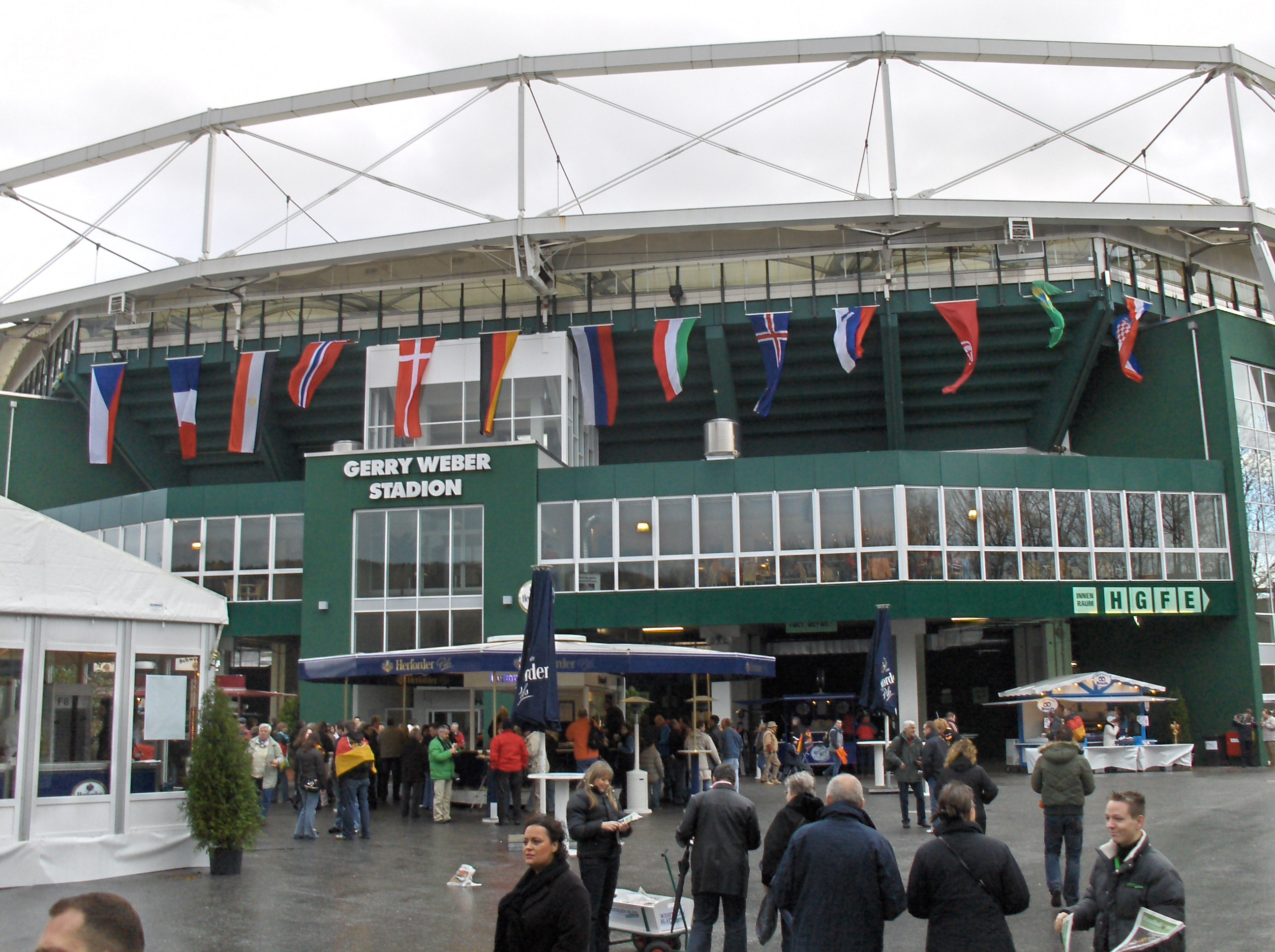
OWL Arena

This is a list of tennis venues to have held a notable tournament, sorted by country.

== Argentina ==
Venue	Tournament(s) held (Dates held)
Andino Tennis Club	Torneo de Mendoza
Buenos Aires Lawn Tennis Club	ATP Buenos Aires; Copa Peugeot Argentina de Tenis (2003–2012); WTA Argentine Open (1986–1987)
Club Banco Hispano	Copa San Juan Gobierno (2012–2016)
Complejo Jeep Park de Benavídez	Copa Ciudad de Tigre (2017–present)
Córdoba Lawn Tenis Club	Copa Agco Cordoba (2012-2014); Córdoba Open (2019-)
Corrientes Tenis Club	Corrientes Challenger (2015)
El Abierto Club	Copa Fila (2015–present)
Estadio Mary Terán de Weiss	Davis Cup (2006–present); 2018 Summer Youth Olympics; 2006 South American Games
Parque Sarmiento	2017 Davis Cup
Patinódromo Municipal	Mar del Plata Open (1981); 2014 Davis Cup
Polideportivo Islas Malvinas	2008 Davis Cup Final
Racket Club	Copa Petrobras Buenos Aires (2001-2010); Copa Fila (2010-2013); Racket Club Open (2016)
Tecnópolis	2015 Davis Cup
Estadio Aldo Cantoni	2018 Davis Cup

== Australia ==
Venue	Tournament(s) held (Dates held)	References
Acer Arena	Masters Cup	
Burnie Tennis Club	Burnie International (2003–present)	
Burswood Dome	Hopman Cup (1989–2012)	AUS 2
Cooper Park	Sydney International (1909–1921)	
Elite Tennis International	Caloundra International (2004–2012)	
Hobart International Tennis Centre	Australian Hard Court Tennis Championships (1979–1980); Moorilla Hobart International (1994–present)	
Hope Island Resort Tennis Centre	ATP Tour World Championships-Doubles (1990); Australian Women's Hardcourts (1997–2008)	
Hordern Pavilion	Sydney Indoor (1973–1982)	
Kooyong Lawn Tennis Club	Australian Open (1927, 1935, 1953, 1968, 1972–1987); Victorian Championships (1934-71); AAMI Classic (1988–present)	AUS 18, EXH 1
Maccabi Tennis Club	Maccabi Men's Challenger (2009–present)	
Memorial Drive Park	Australian Open (1926, 1938, 1963, 1967); Adelaide International (1974–2007); World Tennis Challenge (2009–present)	
Melbourne Park	Australian Open (1988–present)	AUS 18
Milton Tennis Centre	Queensland Championships (1919–94); Australian Open (1923, 1960, 1969); National Panasonic Open (1982–1985); Danone Hardcourt Championships (1987–1994)	
NSW Tennis Centre	Olympic Games (2000); Sydney International (2001–2019)	AUS 12
National Sports Club	Canberra International (2001–2006)	
Perth Arena	Hopman Cup (2013–2019)	AUS 14
Queensland Tennis Centre	Brisbane International (2009–present)	
Sydney Entertainment Centre	Sydney Indoor (1983–1994)	
Sydney Cricket Ground	Sydney International (1885–1908)	
Warehouseman's Cricket Club	Australian Open (1905)	AUS 18
White City Tennis Club	Australian Open (1951, 1962, 1970–1971); Sydney International (1922–2000)	AUS 18

== Austria ==
Venue	Tournament(s) held (Dates held)
1. Salzburger Tennisverein	Salzburg Open (2022-present)
Intersport Arena	Generali Ladies Linz (1987–present)
TC GM-Sports Anif	Salzburg Open (2021)
TC Union Mauthausen	Upper Austria Open (2022-present)
TC Tulln	NÖ Open (2021-present)
Tennis Stadium Kitzbühel	Austrian Open Kitzbühel (1956–present); WTA Austrian Open (1969–1977, 1979–1983, 1990–1993)
Werzer Arena	Hypo Group Tennis International (2006–2008)
Wiener Stadthalle	Bank Austria-TennisTrophy (1974, 1976–present)

== Belarus ==
Venue	Tournament(s) held (Dates held)
Tennis Palace	Velcom cup

== Belgium ==
Venue	Tournament(s) held (Dates held)
Beerschot Tennis Club	Olympic Games (1920)
Complexe Sportif de Blocry	BW Open (2023-present)
Ethias Arena	Gaz de France Stars (2004–2006)
Forest National	Brussels Indoor (1981–1988, 1990–1992)
Royal Leopold Club	World Hard Court Championships (1922)
Lotto Mons Expo	Ethias Trophy (2005–2016)
Royal Zoute Tennis Club	Sanex Trophy (1999–2001)
Sportpaleis Antwerp	Proximus Diamond Games (2002–2008, 2015)

== Bosnia ==
Venue	Tournament(s) held (Dates held)
Olympic Hall Juan Antonio Samaranch	BH Telecom Indoors (2003–present)
Tenis Klub Mladost	Banja Luka Challenger (2002–present)

== Brazil ==
Venue	Tournament(s) held (Dates held)	References
Campos do Jordão Tênis Clube de Turismo		
Centro Cultural e Recreativo Cristóvão Colombo	Brasil Tennis Challenger (2023-present)	
Clube Atlético Monte Líbano	South American Games (2002)	
Marapendi Club	Pan American Games (2007)	BRA 3
Olympic Tennis Centre	Olympic Games (2016)	BRA 4
Parque Villa Lobos	Aberto de São Paulo (2009-2014) SP Open (2025- present)	

== Canada ==
Venue	Tournament(s) held (Dates held)	References
Club de Tennis des Loisirs de Granby	Challenger Banque Nationale de Granby (1995, 1997–present)	
Hamilton Tennis Club		
Hollyburn Country Club	Odlum Brown Vancouver Open (2005–present)	
Jericho Tennis Club	Odlum Brown Vancouver Open (2003–2004)	
Mount Treblant Beach and Tennis Club		
National Tennis Centre	Canadian Masters (-2003)	
PEPS	Bell Challenge (1994–2009)	
Rexall Centre	Canadian Masters (2004–present); Pan American Games (2015)	CAN 6
Stade Uniprix	Canadian Masters (1995–present)	
Toronto Lawn Tennis Club	Canadian Masters (1881-?)	
Winnipeg Lawn Tennis Club	Pan American Games (1967, 1999)	CAN 11

== Chile ==
Venue	Tournament(s) held (Dates held)
Estadio Universidad del Mar	La Serena Open
Court Central Estadio Nacional – Santiago	
Centro de Tenis Las Salinas/Club Naval de Campo Las Salinas	Cachantún Cup (2008); Movistar Open (2001–2009)
Hacienda Chicureo Golf Club	Movistar Open (2010–present)
Santa Rosa de Las Condes 1993–1994 Movistar	
San Carlos de Apoquindo 1995–1999 Movistar	

== China ==
Venue	Tournament(s) held (Dates held)	References
Beijing International Tennis Center	Asian Games (1990) Davis Cup (2011)	
Beijing Tennis Center	China Open (2004–2008)	
Guangdong Olympic Tennis Centre	Asian Games (2010) Guangzhou International Women's Open (2015–present)	
Guangzhou International Tennis Center	Guangzhou International Women's Open (2009–2010)	
Guangzhou Tianhe Sports Center	Guangzhou International Women's Open (2004–08, 2011–14)	
National Tennis Center, Beijing	Olympic Games (2008); China Open (2009–present)	
Qizhong Forest Sports City Arena	ATP World Tour Finals (2005–2008); Shanghai Masters (2009–present)	CHN 6
Shanghai New International Expo Center	ATP World Tour Finals (2002); Shanghai Open (2003–2004)	
Shanghai XianXia Tennis Center	Shanghai Open (1996–2001); Polo Open (2002)	
Victoria Park, Hong Kong	Hong Kong Open (1973–2002); Hong Kong Tennis Classic (1999–present)	
Optics Valley International Tennis Center	Wuhan Open (2014–present)	
Sichuan International Tennis Center	Chengdu Open	
Zhuhai Hengqin International Tennis Center	Zhuhai Open WTA Elite Trophy (2015–2019)	
Shenzhen Longgang Sports Center	WTA Shenzhen Open (2013–present) ATP Shenzhen Open (2014–18)	
Tuanbo International Tennis Center	Tianjin Open (2014–present)	
Zhongyuan Tennis Training Base Management Center	Zhengzhou Women's Tennis Open (2017–present)	

== Croatia ==
Venue	Tournament(s) held (Dates held)
Dom Sportova	PBZ Zagreb Indoors (1996–1997, 2006–present)
ITC Stella Maris	Croatia Open Umag (1990–present)
Športski Park Mladost	Croatian Bol Ladies Open (1995-1997, 2016–present); Zagreb Open (1996–present)

== Czech Republic ==
Venue	Tournament(s) held (Dates held)
I. ČLTK Prague	Prague Open (1987–1999); ECM Prague Open (1992–1995, 1997–1998, 2000–2010)
TK Agrofert Prostějov	UniCredit Czech Open (1994–present); ECM Prague Open (1999)
ITS Tennis Centre	ITS Cup (2009–present)
TK Sparta Prague	Sparta Prague Open (2010–present)

== Denmark ==
Venue	Tournament(s) held (Dates held)
Farum Arena	e-Boks Danish Open (2010–2012)

== Dominican Republic ==
Venue	Tournament(s) held (Dates held)	References
Cap Cana Racquet Village	Copa Cap Cana ATP Challenger Tour (2025–present)	
Centro Nacional de Tenis	Copa Merengue (2010–present); 2003 Pan American Games 2026 Central American and Caribbean Games	
Oscar de la Renta Tennis Center	Oscar de la Renta Social Tennis Tournament (2002–present)	
Santo Domingo Tennis Club (La Bocha)	Santo Domingo Open ATP Challenger Tour (2015–2024)	

== Ecuador ==
Venue	Tournament(s) held (Dates held)
Umiña Tenis Club	Manta Open (2004–present)

== Estonia ==
Venue	Tournament(s) held (Dates held)
FORUS Tennis Center	Tallinn Open (2022)

== France ==
Venue	Tournament(s) held (Dates held)
ASCH Montpellier Tennis	Open GDF Suez de Montpellier Agglomération Hérault (2006–present)
Association de tennis du Griffon Parc de Brezillet	
Aix-en-Provence	Aix-en-Provence Open (1977–1984); WTA Aix-en-Provence Open (1988)
Arcachon Tennis Club	
Arena Montpellier	Open Sud de France (2010–present)
Arènes de Metz	Open de Moselle (2003–present)
Beaulieu Tennis Club	Bristol Cup
Carleton Tennis Club	Bristol Cup
Centre de Ligue des Monts d'Auvergne	Open GDF Suez Clermont-Auvergne (2007–present)
Centre de ligue du Trebignon	Internationaux du Doubs – Open de Franche-Comté; Open GDF Suez Belfort
Centre Sportif de Hautepierre	Internationaux de Strasbourg (1987–present)
Cercle de Puteaux	
Complexe Sportif Chantereyne	
Complexe sportif des Résidences	
Couzeix Country Club	Open GDF Suez Region Limousin (2006–present)
Golf Dijon Bourgogne	Open GDF Suez Burgundy (2008–present)
Ile de Puteaux	Olympic Games (1900); French Open (1891, 1893, 1895, 1897, 1899, 1901, 1903, 1905, 1907)
Ligue de Nouvelle Calédonie	Internationaux de Nouvelle-Calédonie
Monte Carlo Country Club – Monte Carlo	
Nice Lawn Tennis Club	
Palais des Sports de Gerland	Grand Prix de Tennis de Lyon (1987–2009)
Palais des Sports de Marseille	Open 13 (1993–present)
Palais des Sports d'Orléans	
Palais des Sports de Toulouse	Grand Prix de Tennis de Toulouse (1982–2000); Masters France (2008–present)
Palais Omnisports de Paris-Bercy	Paris Masters (1968–1970, 1972–1982, 1986–present)
Parc de Loisir du Pontet	Open GDF Suez Contamines-Montjoie (1997–present)
Parc des Sports Aguiléra	Open GDF Suez Biarritz (2003–present)
Parc des sports de Marville	Open GDF Suez de Bretagne (1996–present)
Parc des Sports Pierre Sauvaigo	Open GDF Suez Cagnes-sur-mer (1998–present)
Park Lebret – Denain	Open GDF Suez to the Porte du Hainaut (1998–present)
Paris Golf and Country Club	
Racing Club de France	French Open (1892, 1894, 1896, 1898, 1900, 1902, 1904, 1906, 1908, 1910–1914, 1920–1924, 1926)
Salle Colette Besson Complexe Sportif de Brequigny	
Salle Lauga	
Stade Antoine Lovera	
Stade avenue de l'Isle	Open GDF Suez de Midi-Pyrénées (1997–present)
Stade Français	World Hard Court Championships (1912–1914, 1920–1923); French Open (1925, 1927)
Stade Olympique Yves-du-Manoir	Olympic Games (1924)
Stade Pierre de Coubertin	French Pro Championship (1963–1967); ATP World Tour Finals (1971); Open Gaz de France (1993–2014)
Stade Roger Dantou	Open GDF Suez du Périgord (1997–present)
Stade Roland Garros	French Open (1928–present); French Pro Championship (1930–1939, 1956, 1958–1962)
Tennis Clubs Bagnolais	
Tennis Club de Lyon	Open GDF Suez Lyon (2009–present)
Tennis Club de Marseille	Open GDF Suez Marseille (2002–present)
Tennis Club de Paris	French Covered Court Championships (1895-1946, 1951–60, 1962, 1964, 1967–71)
Tennis Club de Saint-Rémy-de-Provence	
Tennis Club Jocondien	Open GDF Suez Touraine (2007–present)
Tennisud Vertou	Open GDF Suez Nantes Atlantique (2004–present)
Villa Primrose	French Open (1909); BNP Paribas Primrose Bordeaux (2008–present)

== Germany ==
Venue	Tournament(s) held (Dates held)
Am Rothenbaum	International German Open; Betty Barclay Cup
Bad Homburg Tennis Club	The Homburg Cup (1894-1935)
Baden-Baden Lawn Tennis Club	Baden Baden International (1896-1966)
Braunschweiger Tennis und Hockey Club	Sparkassen Open (1994–present)
Rot-Weiss Tennis Club	WTA German Open (1979–2008)
Festhalle Frankfurt	ATP Finals (1990-1995)
OWL Arena	Gerry Weber Open (1993–present)
Grugahalle	Eurocard Open (1995)
Hanover fairground	ATP Finals (1996-1999)
Hanns-Martin-Schleyer-Halle	Eurocard Open (1996–2001)
Olympiahalle	Grand Slam Cup; WTA Tour Championships
Porsche Arena	Porsche Tennis Grand Prix (2006–present)
Uhlenhorst	
Rochusclub	Düsseldorf Grand Prix (1968, 1970, 1972–1977); World Team Cup (1978–2012)
Tennisanlage TC Schierenberg	Black Forest Open (1999-2009)
Tennisclub Grün-Gold Wolfsburg	Volkswagen Challenger (1993-2012)
Tennis Club Weissenhof	MercedesCup (1978–present)

== Great Britain ==
Venue	Tournament(s) held (Dates held)	References
Aigburth Cricket Ground	Northern Championships; Liverpool International Tennis Tournament (2014-present)	
Bank of England Sports Ground	Wimbledon Championships Qualifying	
Battersea Park	Guardian Direct Cup (1998–1999)	GB2
Beckenham Cricket Club	Kent Championships (1886–1996)	
Calderstones Park	Liverpool International Tennis Tournament (2002-2013)	
Church Road	Wimbledon Championships (1922–present); Wimbledon Pro (1967); Olympic Games (2012)	
Craiglockhart Lawn Tennis Club	Scottish Lawn Tennis Championships (1900, 1913,1919–29),(1946–57, 1959–60) 1963, 1965–1970)	
Craiglockhart Tennis Centre	Aegon GB Pro-Series Edinburgh (ITF Futures, ITF 10K); Commonwealth Youth Games (2000)	CYWG
Craigside Hydro Badmington and Tennis Club	Welsh Covered Court Championships, (1893-1955)	
Cumberland Lawn Tennis Club	Aegon GB Pro-Series Cumberland (ITF Futures, ITF 10K)	
Devonshire Park Lawn Tennis Club	South of England Championships (1881-1967); South of England Open, (1968-1973); Eastbourne International (1974-current)	
Priory Lawn Tennis Club (destroyed by a fire in 1963); Edgbaston Priory Club	Midland Counties Championship, (1882-1969); Edgbaston Cup, (1982–89); Birmingham Classic, (1989-current)	
Esporta Riverside Chiswick	Aegon GB Pro-Series Chiswick (ITF Futures, ITF 10K)	
Felixstowe Lawn Tennis Club	Aegon Pro-Series Felixstowe (ITF Futures, ITF 10K)	
Foxhills Lawn Tennis Club	Aegon GB Pro-Series Foxhills (ITF Futures, ITF 25K)	
Fort Hill Tennis Club	Scottish Hard Court Championships (1982-1994)	
Frinton Lawn Tennis Club	Aegon GB Pro-Series Frinton (ITF Futures, ITF 10K)	
Gosling Tennis Centre	Aegon GB Pro-Series Gosling (ITF 10K, Challenger)	
Graves Tennis Centre	Aegon GB Pro-Series Sheffield (ITF Futures)	
Hyde Park Lawn Tennis Club	British Covered Court Championships (1885–1895)	
Ilkley Lawn Tennis Club	Aegon GB Pro-Series Ilkley (ITF Futures)	
Les Ormes Indoor Tennis Centre	The Jersey International (25K); Caversham International Tennis Tournament (ITF 10K)	
London Arena	AXA Cup (2000)	
O2 Arena	Turbo Tennis (2007); ATP World Tour Finals (2009–present)	
NEC Arena	WCT World Doubles (1983); Birmingham Open (1991)	GB2
National Tennis Centre	Aegon GB Pro-Series Roehampton (ITF Futures)	
Newport Athletic Club	Welsh Championships (tennis); Championship of Wales; Welsh Open (1892,1897–99, 1900, 1910–14, 1920–39, 1946–1974)	
Northern Lawn Tennis Club	Northern Lawn Tennis Championships (1880-1979); Greater Manchester Lawn Tennis Championships (1980-1988); Manchester Open (1989–1994); Manchester Trophy (1995–2009)	
Northumberland Club	Aegon GB Pro-Series Newcastle (ITF Futures)	
North Wales Regional Tennis Centre	Aegon GB Pro-Series Wrexham (ITF 10K, ITF 25K, ITF Futures)	
Nottingham Tennis Centre	Nottingham Open; Aegon Trophy; Aegon GB Pro-Series Nottingham (ITF Futures)	
Olympia	WCT World Doubles (1979–1982)	
	WCT World Doubles (1979–1982)	
Queen's Club	Queen's Club Championships (1890–Present); British Covered Court Championships (1890–1968); Olympic Games (1908); Queen's Club Pro (1928); World Covered Court Championships (1920)	
Penarth Lawn Tennis Club	Welsh Championships, (1886–89, 1893–95, 1901–09)	
Prince's Club; New Princes Club	Princes Club Championships, (1880–1883)	
Royal Albert Hall	WCT World Doubles (1984–1986); Masters Grand Prix-Doubles (1986–1989); Aegon Masters Tennis (1997–present)	
Scotstoun Leisure Centre	Aegon GB Pro-Series Glasgow (ITF Futures (2 events), ITF 10K, 25K)	
St Andrews Lawn Tennis Club	Scottish Championships, (1893); Scottish Hard Court Championships (1923-1981)	
Stoke Park Club	Boodles Challenge (2002–present)	
Sunderland Tennis Centre	Aegon GB Pro-Series Sunderland (ITF 10K)	
Surbiton Racket & Fitness Club	Surrey Championships (1890-1967); Surrey Grass Court Championships (1968–1980); Surbiton Trophy (1998–2008)	
Sutton Tennis Academy	Aegon GB Pro-Series Sutton (ITF 25K)	
Tarka Tennis Centre	Aegon GB Pro-Series Barnstaple (ITF 75K)	
TeamBath; University of Bath	Aegon GB Pro-Series Bath (ITF Futures, ITF 10K)	
Tipton Sports Academy	Aegon GB Pro-Series Tipton (ITF Futures)	
Welsh National Tennis Centre	British Hard Court Championships (1996); Aegon GB Pro-Series Cardiff (ITF Futures)	
Welti Tennis & Leisure	Aegon GB Pro-Series Shrewsbury (ITF 75K)	
Wembley Arena	Wembley Championship (1934–1939, 1949–1953, 1956–1971, 1976–1990); British Covered Court Championships (1969–1971); Superset Tennis (2004)	
West Hants Tennis Club	British Hard Court Championships (1928–1983, 1995); Aegon GB Pro-Series Bournemouth (ITF Futures, ITF 10K)	
Worple Road	Wimbledon Championships (1877–1921); Olympic Games (1908)	
Victoria Park	International Pro Championship of Britain	

== Greece ==
Venue	Tournament(s) held (Dates held)
Athens Lawn Tennis Club	Olympic Games (1886); ATP Athens Open (1986–1994)
Olympic Tennis Centre	Olympic Games (2004); Status Athens Open (2008–present); Vogue Athens Open (2008–present)
Rhodes Tennis Club	Ixian Grand Aegean Tennis Cup (2009–present)

== Hungary ==
Venue	Tournament(s) held (Dates held)
Római Teniszakadémia	Budapest Challenger (May) (1994–2005); Budapest Challenger (September) (1986–2005); Budapest Grand Prix (1993–present)
Budaörsi Teniszcentrum	Stella Artois Clay Court Championships (2001–2005)
Gellért Szabadidőközpont	Hungary vs. Israel Fed Cup Play-off (2001); Hungarian Tennis Championships (1999); Hungary vs. Norway Davis Cup Europe II 2nd Round (2004); Hungary vs. Serbia & Montenegro Davis Cup Europe II Final (2004)

== India ==
Venue	Tournament(s) held (Dates held)	References
Cricket Club of India	Kingfisher Airlines Tennis Open (2006–2007); Mumbai Open (2017-2018)	
KSLTA Signature Kingfisher Tennis Stadium	ATP Tour World Championships – Doubles/ATP World Doubles Challenge Cup (2000–2001); Bangalore Open (WTA) (2006–2008); Bangalore Open (ATP) (2008–2009) (on both occasions the tournament was cancelled)	
Netaji Indoor Stadium	Sunfeast Open (2005–2007)	
R.K. Khanna Tennis Complex	Asian Games (1982); Commonwealth Games (2010)	IND 4
SAAP Tennis Complex	Afro-Asian Games (2003)	
SDAT Tennis Stadium	Chennai Open (1996–2017)	

== Indonesia ==
Venue	Tournament(s) held (Dates held)	References
Bukit Asam Tennis Stadium	Asian Games (2018); Southeast Asian Games (2011)	
Gelora Bung Karno Tennis Indoor Stadium	Asian Games (2018)	
Gelora Bung Karno Tennis Outdoor Stadium	Asian Games (1962, 2018)	
Jayapura Mayor's Office Tennis Court	National Sports Week (2021)	
Manahan Tennis Court	ASEAN Para Games (2011)	
Palaran Tennis Court	National Sports Week (2008)	
PTPN V Tennis Court	National Sports Week (2012)	
Siliwangi Tennis Court	National Sports Week (2016)	
Maluku Park Tennis Court	National Sports Week (2016)	
Klub Kelapa Gading Tennis Court	Asian Para Games (2018)	

== Israel ==
Venue	Tournament(s) held (Dates held)
Israel Tennis Center	Israel Open (2008–present)

== Italy ==
Venue	Tournament(s) held (Dates held)
A.S.D. Eurotennis Club	Zucchetti Kos Tennis Cup (2004–present)
Centro Sportivo Comunale "I. Barberis"	Alessandria Challenger (2008–present)
Centro Sportivo Stradivari	Trofeo Paolo Corazzi (2004–present)
Circolo della Stampa	Sporting Challenger (2002–present)
Circolo Tennis Barletta	Open Barletta (1997–present)
Circolo Tennis Francesco Guzzini	Guzzini Challenger (2003–present)
Circolo Tennis Maggioni	Carisap Tennis Cup (2001, 2003–2004, 2008–present)
Circolo Tennis Monza	Mitsubishi Electric Cup (2005–present)
Circolo Tennis Orbetello	Trofeo Bellaveglia (2009–present)
Circolo Tennis Reggio Emilia	Camparini Gioielli Cup
Circolo Tennis Rimini	Riviera di Rimini Challenger (2004–present)
Circolo Tennis Rovereto	Internazionali di Tennis Città di Rovereto (2023-present)
Circolo Tennis Sanremo	Sanremo Open (1990); Sanremo Tennis Cup (2002–present)
Foro Italico	Italian Open (1935, 1950–present)
Harbour Club Milano	Aspria Tennis Cup (2006–present)
Milan Pallalido	Milan Indoor (2001–2005)
PalaNorda di Bergamo Palazetto di Gorie	Internazionali di Tennis di Bergamo Trofeo Trismoka (2006–present)
Stadio Beppe Croce	AON Open Challenger
Tennis Club Garden	Roma Open (1996–present)
Tennis Club Napoli	Tennis Napoli Cup (1995–1999, 2002–2010)

== Japan ==
Venue	Tournament(s) held (Dates held)
Aichi Prefectural Gymnasium	TVA Cup (1995)
Amagasaki Memorial Sports Centre	Asian Open (1992–1994)
Ariake Tennis Forest Park	HP Open (2015-2017); Japan Open Tennis Championships (1972–present); Nichirei International Championships (1991–1996); Toray Pan Pacific Open (2008–present)
Tokyo Metropolitan Gymnasium	Toray Pan Pacific Open (1984–2007)
Utsubo Tennis Center	HP Open (2009–2014)

== Lithuania ==
Venue	Tournament(s) held (Dates held)
SEB Arena	Vilnius Open (2022) Vitas Gerulaitis Cup (2023-present)

== Mexico ==
Venue	Tournament(s) held (Dates held)
Arena GNP Seguros	Mexican Open (2022–present)
Atlas Sports Club	Olympic Games (1968)
Chapultepec Sports Center	Olympic Games (1968)
Guadalajara Country Club	Olympic Games (1968)
Guadalajara Sports Club	Olympic Games (1968)

== Netherlands ==
Venue	Tournament(s) held (Dates held)	References
Alphense Tennis Club	TEAN International (1996–present)	
Rotterdam Ahoy	ABN AMRO World Tennis Tournament (1972, 1974–present)	
Autotron Rosmalen	Rosmalen Grass Court Championships (1990–present)	Dutch 3
Sportlokaal de Bokkeduinen	Dutch Open (2002–2008)	

== New Zealand ==
Venue	Tournament(s) held (Dates held)
ASB Tennis Centre	Heineken Open; ASB Classic

== Poland ==
Venue	Tournament(s) held (Dates held)
Hala Orbita	KGHM Dialog Polish Indoors (2000-2009)
Legia Tennis Centre	Warsaw Open (1995–2000, 2002–2007, 2009–2010)
Korty tenisowe T.S. Olimpia	Poznań Porsche Open (2004–present)
Wojska Polskiego	Pekao Open (1993–present)

== Portugal ==
Venue	Tournament(s) held (Dates held)
Clube de Ténis do Estoril	Estoril Open (2015–2024)
Estoril Court Central	Portugal Open (1993–2014)

== Puerto Rico ==
Venue	Tournament(s) held (Dates held)
Mayagüez University Campus Tennis Courts	Central American and Caribbean Games (2010)

== Qatar ==
Venue	Tournament(s) held (Dates held)
Khalifa International Tennis and Squash Complex	Qatar ExxonMobil Open (1993–present); Qatar Total Open (2001–2008, 2011–present); Asian Games (2006); WTA Tour Championships (2008–2010)

== Russia ==
Venue	Tournament(s) held (Dates held)
Moscow Arena	Moscow Ladies Open (1989–1990, 1994–1995); Kremlin Cup (1990–1996); Kremlin Cup (combined) (1996–present)
Petersburg Sports and Concert Complex	Moscow Ladies Open (1991); St. Petersburg Open (1995–present); St. Petersburg Ladies' Trophy (2016–present)

== Serbia ==
Venue	Tournament(s) held (Dates held)
SRPC Milan Gale Muškatirović	Serbia Open (2009–2012)
Tennis Club Gemax	GEMAX Open (2002–2006, 2009–2010)

== South Africa ==
Venue	Tournament(s) held (Dates held)
Arthur Ashe Tennis Centre	Soweto Open
Montecasino	SA Tennis Open

== South Korea ==
Venue	Tournament(s) held (Dates held)
Seoul Olympic Park Tennis Center	Asian Games (1986); Olympic Games (1988); Seoul Open (1987–1996); Korea Open (2004–present)

== Spain ==
Venue	Tournament(s) held (Dates held)
Agora, Ciutat de les Arts i les Ciències	Valencia Open 500 (2009–present)
Barcelona Tennis Olímpic	Olympic Games (1992); Barcelona Ladies Open (2007)
Club Tennis Els Gorchs	Challenger Club Els Gorchs (2023-present)
Club de Tenis Puente Romano	Andalucia Tennis Experience (2009–2011)
David Lloyd Club Turó	Barcelona Ladies Open (2008–2012)
Madrid Arena	Madrid Masters (2002–2008); WTA Tour Championships (2006, 2007)
Manzanares Park Tennis Center	Madrid Masters (2009–present)
Real Club de Tenis Barcelona	Barcelona Open (1956–present)
Real Club de Tenis Betis	Copa Sevilla (1998–present)
Real Club de Tenis de San Sebastián	Concurso Internacional de Tenis – San Sebastián (2008–present)
Club Tenis Pozoblanco	Open Diputación Ciudad de Pozoblanco (1999–present)
Villa de El Espinar	Open Castilla y León (1991–present)

== Sweden ==
Venue	Tournament(s) held (Dates held)
Ericsson Globe	Stockholm Open (1989–1993)
Good to Great Tennis Academy	Good to Great Challenger (2023–)
Royal Tennis Hall	Stockholm Open (1968–1988) ATP World Tour Finals (1975)
Scandinavium	Swedish Pro Tennis Championships (1972–1973)

== Switzerland ==
Venue	Tournament(s) held (Dates held)
Drizia-Miremont Tennis Club	IPP Trophy (1988–present)
Hallenstadion	Zurich Open (1984–2008)
St. Jakobshalle	Davidoff Swiss Indoors (1975–present)
Roy Emerson Arena	Allianz Suisse Open Gstaad; Ladies Championship Gstaad (2016–2018)
Swiss National Tennis Center	Ladies Open Biel Bienne (2017)
Tennis Club Lido Lugano	BSI Challenger Lugano (1999–present); Ladies Open Lugano (2018–present)
Saint Moritz Palace Lawn Tennis Club	World Covered Court Championships (1922)

== Thailand ==
Venue	Tournament(s) held (Dates held)
IMPACT Arena	

== Ukraine ==
Venue	Tournament(s) held (Dates held)
Megaron Tennis Complex	PEOPLEnet Cup (2003–2008)

== United Arab Emirates ==
Venue	Tournament(s) held (Dates held)
Aviation Club Tennis Centre	Dubai Tennis Championships (1993–present)
Abu Dhabi International Tennis Complex	Abu Dhabi Professional Tennis Tournament (2006); Capitala World Tennis Championship (2009–present)

== United States ==
Venue	Tournament(s) held (Dates held)	References
A.C. Nielson Tennis Center	Nielsen Pro Tennis Championship (1984–1985, 1987–1994, 1997–2000, 2006–present)	
Amelia Island Plantation	Family Circle Cup (1975–1976); MPS Group Championships (1980–2008)	
Ashland Tennis Center	Our Lady Of Bellefonte Hospital Tennis Classic (2004–present)	
Atlanta Athletic Club	Verizon Tennis Challenge (1992–2001); Atlanta Tennis Championships (2010–present)	
Atkins Tennis Center	JSM Challenger (1996–present)	
Avondale Athletic Club		
Binghamton Tennis Center	Levene Gouldin & Thompson Tennis Challenger (1994–present)	
Boar's Head Sports Club	Boyd Tinsley 2010 Women's Clay Court Classic	
Boca West Resort and Club	Miami Masters (1986)	
Calabasas Tennis & Swim Center	Calabasas Pro Tennis Championships	
Cheval Athletic Club	Red Rose Inn and Suites Tennis Classic	
Cincinnati Convention Center		
Cincinnati Tennis Club		
Cleveland Skating Club	Cleveland Ladies Open	
Coney Island		
Cooper Tennis Complex	World TeamTennis (1996–present)	
Copeland-Cox Tennis Center	Newton Cox Professional Tennis Classic	
CoreStates Center	U.S. Pro Indoor (1997–1998)	
County Tennis Club of Westchester (at Hartsdale)	Eastern New York State Tennis Championships (1912–1916). Later hosted by: Amackassin Club (1917, 1920–1924); Mount Pleasant Lawn Tennis Club (1918–1919); New York Athletic Club (1925–1926)	
Crandon Park	Miami Masters (1987–2018); Orange Bowl (1999–present)	USA 18
Crotona Park	GHI Bronx Tennis Classic; EmblemHealth Bronx Open	
Cullman-Heyman Tennis Center		USA 18
Darling Tennis Center	Tennis Channel Open (2006–2008); Open Hilton Cup Women's Pro Tournament	
Delray Beach Tennis Center	Virginia Slims of Florida (1993–1995); Delray Beach International Tennis Championships (1999–present)	
Fairmont Scottsdale Princess Tennis Club	ATP Scottsdale Classic (1986–2005)	
Family Circle Tennis Center	Family Circle Cup (2001–present)	
Flamingo Park	Southeastern Pro Championships; Orange Bowl (1947–1998)	
Forestmeadows Tennis Complex	Tallahassee Tennis Challenger (2000–present)	
Fort Walton Beach Tennis Center	Emerald Coast Association of REALTORS $25,000 Women's Challenger	
Francis Field	Olympic Games (1904)	
Franklin Creek Tennis Center	Tail Savannah Challenger (2009–present)	
Frenchman's Creek Beach & Country Club	Virginia Slims of Florida (1984)	
Germantown Cricket Club	U.S. National Championships (1921–1923)	
Hamlet Golf and Country Club		
Hilary J. Boone Tennis Complex	Fifth Third Bank Tennis Championships (1995–present)	
Hilton DFW Lakes	Grapevine Women's $50,000 Tennis Classic	
Home Depot Center	LA Women's Tennis Championships (2003–2009); USTA LA Tennis Open (2005, 2007–present)	
Hurd Tennis Center	Texas Tennis Classic (2023-present)	
Indianapolis Tennis Center	Indianapolis Tennis Championships (1988–2009); Pan American Games (1987)	
Indian Wells Tennis Garden	BNP Paribas Open (2000–present)	USA 18
Kingsmill Tennis Club		
Kiwi Tennis Club	MIMA Foundation USTA Pro Tennis Classic	
Kohala Tennis Garden	Hilton Waikoloa Village USTA Challenger (2000–2008); Waikoloa Championships (2001–2002)	
Lamar Tennis Center	Baton Rouge Pro Tennis Classic	
Laguna Niguel Racquet Club		
Laver's International Tennis Resort	Miami Masters (1985)	
Lindner Family Tennis Center	Cincinnati Masters (1979–present); Cincinnati Women's Open (1988, 2004–present)	
Longwood Cricket Club	Longwood Bowl (1891–1941); U.S. Pro Tennis Championships (1964–1995, 1997–1999); Boston Cup (1998)	
Los Angeles Tennis Center	Olympic Games (1984); LA Tennis Open (1984–present)	
Louisville Tennis Club	Ford Tennis Championships (2006–2008)	
Lunsford Tennis Complex	USTA Tennis Classic of Troy	
Madison Square Garden	WTA Tour Championships (1977, 1979–2000); ATP World Tour Finals (1977–1989); Billie Jean King Cup (2009–present)	
Maryland Farms Racquet Club	Virginia Slims of Nashville (1988–1991)	
McLeod Tennis Center	Lubbock Challenger (2005–2008)	
Midland Community Tennis Center	Dow Corning Tennis Classic	
Mission Hills Country Club	Childhelp Desert Classic	
Moody Coliseum	World Championship Tennis Finals (1971–1979)	
International Tennis Hall of Fame, Newport Casino	US Open (1881–1914); Newport Casino Invitational (1915–1967); Newport Pro Championships (1965–1968); Hall of Fame Tennis Championships (1976–present); Virginia Slims of Newport (1971–1990)	
North Hills Racquet Club	Professional Women's 50K Tournament	
Ojai Valley Athletic Club	Weil Tennis Academy Challenger	
Oak Knoll Country Club	Tangipahoa Tourism/Loeb Law Firm 25k Tennis Classic	
Palmetto Tennis Center	Palmetto Pro Open (2008–present)	
Patsy T. Mink Central Oahu Regional Park Tennis Complex	Honolulu Challenger	
Pelham Racquet Club	Pelham Racquet Club Women's $25K Pro Circuit Challenger	
Philadelphia Convention Hall and Civic Center	Virginia Slims of Philadelphia	
Philadelphia Cricket Club	US Open (1887–1920)	
Pleasant Valley Country Club	St. Vincent Auxiliary Men's Professional Tennis Tournament	
Philadelphia Spectrum	U.S. Professional Indoor (1968–1996)	
Racquet Club of Memphis	Regions Morgan Keegan Championships (1976–present); Cellular South Cup (2002–present)	
Racquet Club of Palm Springs		
Red Rock Country Club	Lexus of Las Vegas Open	
Reunion Arena	World Championship Tennis Finals (1980–1989)	
River Oaks Country Club	River Oaks International Tennis Tournament (1931–present); U.S. Men's Clay Court Championships (2008–present)	
River Forest Tennis Club	U.S. Men's Clay Court Championships (1936, 1938, 1941, 1946, 1948–1954, 1956–1961, 1963–1965	
Sawgrass Country Club	MPS Group Championships (2009–2010)	
Sea Pines Racquet Club	Family Circle Cup (1973–1974, 1977–2000)	
Sportsmen's Tennis Club	Empire Loans Women's Pro Circuit 50K Challenger	
Stone Mountain Tennis Center	Olympic Games (1996)	
Sunrise Tennis Club	BMW Tennis Championship (2004–present)	
Surprise Tennis and Racquet Complex	Sanderson Volvo Future Stars Women's 25K	
Sutter Lawn Tennis Club	Natomas Men's Professional Tennis Tournament (2005–present)	
Tanoan Country Club	Coleman Vision Tennis Championships (1999–present)	
Taube Tennis Center	Bank of the West Classic (1971–1977, 1979–present)	
Tennis Gardens at Longboat Key and Resort	Sarasota Open (2009–present)	
Tennis West Sports & Racquet Club	Hunt Communities USTA 25K Women's Pro Tournament	
TBarM Racquet Club	Challenger of Dallas (1998–1999, 2001–present)	
Tudor City Tennis Club		
UCI Pavilion		
USTA Billie Jean King National Tennis Center	US Open (1978–present)	
Van Der Meer Tennis Center	Head/Tail Activewear Women's $10K	
Wesselman Park Tennis Center	Women's Hospital 10K Professional	
Westgate Tennis Center	Dothan Pro Tennis Classic (2001–present)	
Westside Tennis Club	Virginia Slims of Houston (1985–1995); U.S. Men's Clay Court Championships (2001–2007); ATP World Tour Finals (2003–2004)	
West Side Tennis Club	US Open (1915–1920, 1924–1977); U.S. Pro Tennis Championships (1928–1931, 1942, 1946–1949, 1951 & 1963); WCT Invitational (1978–1979); WCT Tournament of Champions (1980–1989); Forest Hills Tennis Classic (2004–2008)	USA 18
William H.G. FitzGerald Tennis Center	Legg Mason Tennis Classic (1969–present)	
Yuba City Racquet & Health Club	Sunset Moulding YCRC Challenger	

== Uzbekistan ==
Venue	Tournament(s) held (Dates held)
Istiklol Tennis Club	Fergana Challenger (2000–present)

== See also ==
- List of tennis stadiums by capacity
- Lists of stadiums
