= Athens Olympic Tennis Centre Main Court =

Located at the Athens Olympic Sports Complex

Olympic Tennis Centre Main Court
- The Main Court
- The exterior of The Main Court
- Interactive map of Olympic Tennis Centre Main Court
- Full name: Athens Olympic Tennis Centre Main Court
- Location: Marousi, Athens, Greece
- Coordinates: 38.0393°N 23.7910°E
- Capacity: Tennis: 8,600
- Surface: DecoTurf

Construction
- Opened: 2004

The Athens Olympic Tennis Centre Main Court, commonly known simply as, "The Main Court", is the main stadium of the Athens Olympic Tennis Centre, which is a group of 16 tennis courts, located at the Athens Olympic Sports Complex. The Main Court seats 8,600 people for tennis matches.

== History ==
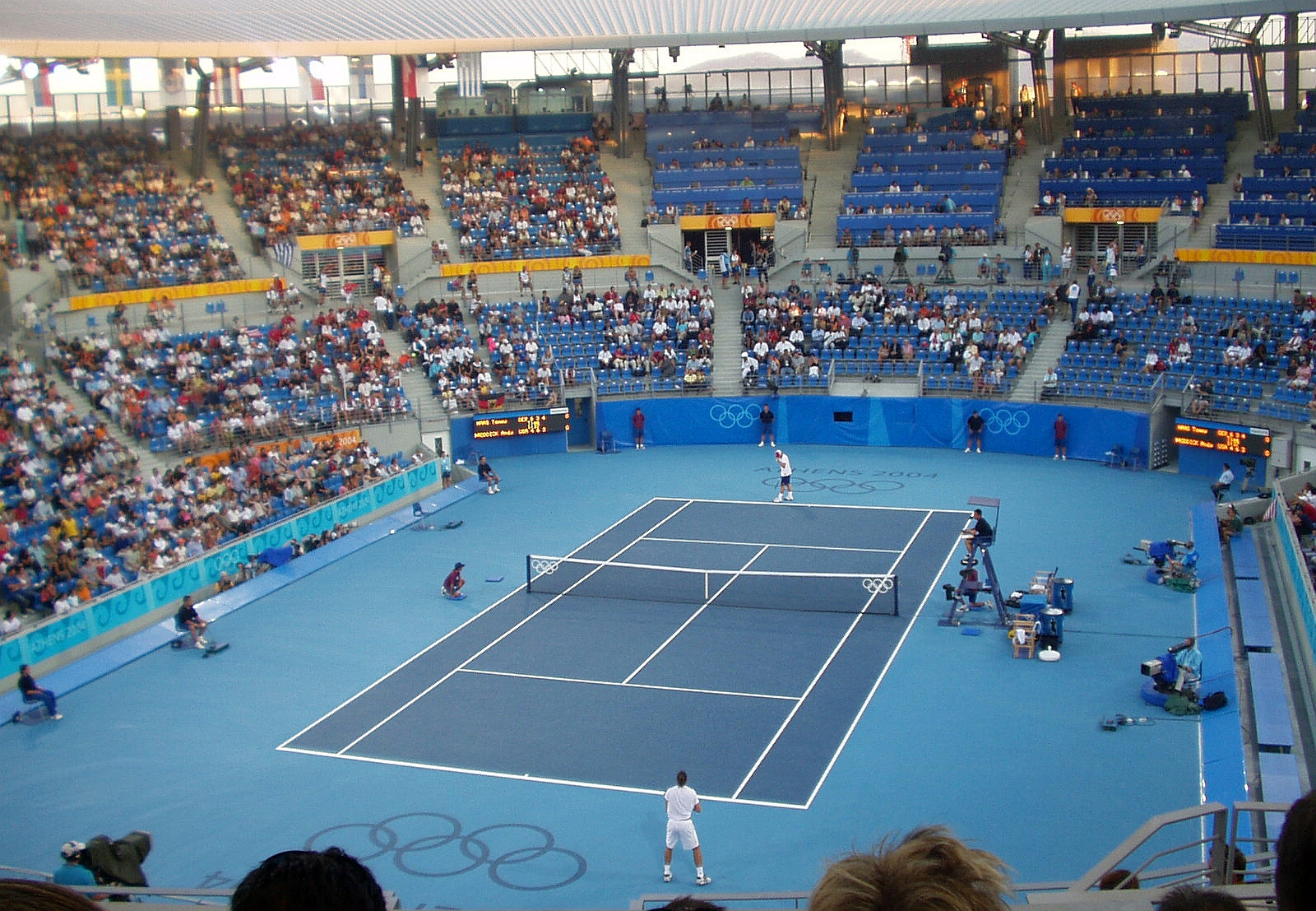
The Main Court of the Athens Olympic Tennis Centre.

The Main Court was completed in February 2004, and officially opened on August 2, 2004. The Main Court hosted tennis events at the 2004 Athens Summer Olympics.

In 2017, the Greek Basket League club, AEK Athens, revealed their plans to acquire the facility, in order to transform it into their home indoor basketball hall, with a spectator capacity for basketball games, of 9,500-10,000 seats.

== See also ==
- List of tennis stadiums by capacity
