= Athens Olympic Tennis Centre =

Grouping of 16 tennis courts at the Athens Olympic Sports Complex in Athens, Greece

Coordinates: 38.0393°N 23.7910°E

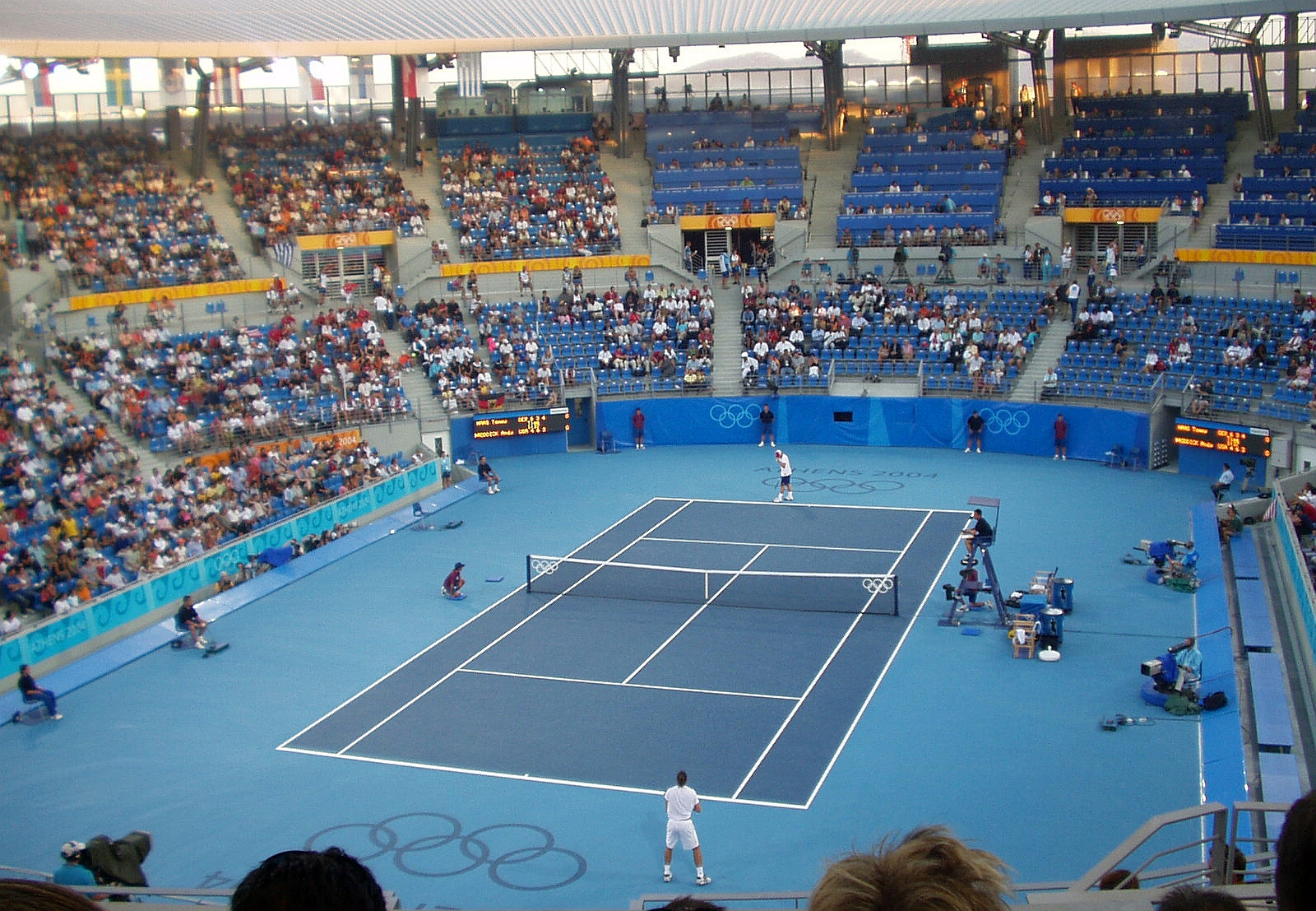
The Main Court at the Athens Olympic Tennis Centre.

Exterior view of The Main Court.

The Athens Olympic Tennis Centre is a grouping of 16 tennis courts at the Athens Olympic Sports Complex, in Marousi, Athens, Greece. The centre consists of a main stadium, known as The Main Court, seating 8,600 fans - though only 6,000 seats were made publicly available during the 2004 Summer Olympics and 2004 Summer Paralympics- two semifinal courts, seating 4,300 spectators - though only 3,200 seats were made publicly available during the Olympics - and thirteen side courts, seating 200 observers each.

Each of the courts use the DecoTurf cushioned acrylic surface, the same surface as the U.S. Open Grand Slam event. The Main Court, in particular, is extremely large by the standards of major tennis competitions, with the seats being relatively far removed from the tennis court.

== History ==
The centre hosted the tennis matches at the 2004 Summer Olympics in Athens, Greece. The centre was completed in February 2004, and officially opened on 2 August 2004.

In 2017, the Greek Basket League club, AEK Athens, revealed their plans to acquire the Main Court facility, in order to transform it into their home indoor basketball hall, with a spectator capacity for basketball games, of 9,500-10,000 seats.

== See also ==
- List of tennis stadiums by capacity
