= List of tennis stadiums by capacity =

The following is a list of notable tennis stadiums by capacity, that is the maximum number of spectators they can regularly accommodate.

Notes:

- Stadiums ordered by their capacity (if equal, by the first stadium to reach the capacity)
- Some of the tennis venues like the O2 Arena and Rotterdam Ahoy, are, from the outset, general or multi-purpose arenas
- The larger (mostly Association football) stadiums that incidentally may have hosted a tennis event are listed in the last section.

== Current tennis stadiums ==
=== ATP/WTA/Grand Slam tour tennis venues ===
Stadium	City	Country	Tournament hosted	Capacity	Indoor/Outdoor	Surface	Tour	Ref.	Image
Arthur Ashe Stadium	New York City	United States	US Open	23,771	outdoor, retractable-roof	hard	Combined		
Indian Wells Tennis Garden – Stadium 1	Indian Wells	United States	Indian Wells Masters	16,102	outdoor	hard	Combined		
Rotterdam Ahoy	Rotterdam	Netherlands	Rotterdam Open	15,800	indoor	hard	ATP		
Palasport Olimpico	Turin	Italy	ATP Finals (2021–2028)	15,657	indoor	hard	ATP		
Accor Arena	Paris	France	Paris Masters	15,500	indoor	hard	ATP		
Perth Arena	Perth	Australia	Hopman Cup (2013–19); ATP Cup (2020–2022); United Cup (2023–present)	15,500	outdoor, retractable-roof	hard	ATP		
Stade Roland Garros – Court Philippe Chatrier	Paris	France	French Open; 2024 Summer Olympics	15,225	outdoor, retractable-roof	clay	Combined		
National Tennis Stadium	Beijing	China	China Open (2011–present); 2008 Summer Olympics	15,000	outdoor, retractable-roof	hard	Combined		
Optics Valley Int. Tennis Center – Central Court	Wuhan	China	Wuhan Open	15,000	outdoor, retractable-roof	hard	WTA		
Wimbledon Centre Court	London	United Kingdom	The Championships, Wimbledon; 2012 Summer Olympics	14,979	outdoor, retractable-roof	grass	Combined		
Rod Laver Arena	Melbourne	Australia	Australian Open	14,820	outdoor, retractable-roof	hard	Combined		
Louis Armstrong Stadium	New York City	United States	US Open	14,000	outdoor, retractable-roof	hard	Combined		
Hard Rock Stadium Court	Miami	United States	Miami Masters (2019–present)	14,000	outdoor	hard	Combined		|
Qizhong Forest Sports City Arena	Shanghai	China	ATP World Tour Finals (2005–08); Shanghai Masters	13,800	outdoor, retractable-roof	hard	ATP		
Sobeys Stadium	Toronto	Canada	Canadian Open	12,500	outdoor	hard	WTA/ATP		|
Caja Mágica, Estadio Manolo Santana	Madrid	Spain	Madrid Masters	12,442	outdoor, retractable-roof	clay	Combined		
Wimbledon No. 1 Court	London	United Kingdom	The Championships, Wimbledon; 2012 Summer Olympics	12,345	outdoor, retractable-roof (from 2019)	grass	Combined		
IGA Stadium	Montreal	Canada	Canadian Open	11,815	outdoor	hard	WTA/ATP		
Lindner Family Tennis Center – Center Court	Mason	United States	Cincinnati Open	11,614	outdoor	hard	Combined		
OWL Arena	Halle	Germany	Gerry Weber Open	11,500	outdoor, retractable-roof	grass	ATP		
Arena GNP Seguros	Acapulco	Mexico	Mexican Open	10,501	outdoor	hard	Combined		
John Cain Arena	Melbourne	Australia	Australian Open	10,500	outdoor, retractable-roof	hard	Combined		
NSW Tennis Centre	Sydney	Australia	Sydney International; 2000 Summer Olympics	10,500	indoor	hard	Combined		
Foro Italico, Campo Centrale	Rome	Italy	Italian Open	10,500	outdoor	clay	Combined		
Credit One Stadium	Charleston	United States	Charleston Open	10,200	outdoor	green clay	WTA		
Monte Carlo Country Club	Roquebrune-Cap-Martin	France	Monte-Carlo Masters	10,200	outdoor	clay	ATP		
Stade Roland Garros – Court Suzanne Lenglen	Paris	France	French Open	10,056	outdoor, retractable-roof	clay	Combined		
Am Rothenbaum	Hamburg	Germany	German Open Tennis Championships	10,000	outdoor, retractable-roof	clay	ATP		
Ariake Coliseum	Tokyo	Japan	Japan Open Tennis Championships, Pan Pacific Open; 2020 Summer Olympics	10,000	outdoor, retractable-roof	hard	WTA/ATP		
Lotus Court	Beijing	China	2008 Summer Olympics; China Open	10,000	outdoor	hard	Combined		
Seoul Olympic Park Tennis Center	Seoul	South Korea	1988 Summer Olympics; Korea Open	10,000	outdoor	hard	WTA		
Estoril Court Central	Oeiras	Portugal	Portugal Open	10,000	outdoor	clay	Combined		
Wiener Stadthalle	Vienna	Austria	Vienna Open	9,600	indoor	hard	ATP		
Guangdong Olympic Tennis Centre – Centre Court	Guangzhou	China	Guangzhou International Women's Open (2015–18)	9,534	outdoor	hard	WTA		
St. Jakobshalle	Basel	Switzerland	Swiss Indoors	9,000	indoor	hard	ATP		
Ginásio do Ibirapuera	São Paulo	Brazil	Brasil Open (2012–15, 2018–present)	9,000	indoor	clay	ATP		
Pista Rafael Nadal	Barcelona	Spain	Barcelona Open	8,800	outdoor	clay	ATP		
Queen's Club	London	United Kingdom	Queen's Club Championships	8,651	outdoor	grass	ATP		
Delray Beach Tennis Center – Stadium	Delray Beach	United States	Delray Beach Open	8,200	outdoor	hard	ATP		
Grandstand	New York City	United States	US Open	8,125	outdoor	hard	Combined		
Garanti Koza Arena	Istanbul	Turkey	TEB BNP Istanbul Open	8,000	outdoor	clay	ATP		
Devonshire Park Lawn Tennis Club	Eastbourne	United Kingdom	Eastbourne International	8,000	outdoor	grass	WTA		
Indian Wells Tennis Garden – Stadium 2	Indian Wells	United States	Indian Wells Masters	8,000	outdoor	hard	Combined		
William H.G. FitzGerald Tennis Center	Washington, D.C.	United States	Washington Open	7,500	outdoor	hard	Combined		
Margaret Court Arena	Melbourne	Australia	Australian Open	7,500	outdoor, retractable-roof	hard	Combined		
Sud de France Arena	Montpellier	France	Open Sud de France	7,500	indoor	hard	ATP		
KSK Arena	St. Petersburg	Russia	St. Petersburg Open (2015–present); St. Petersburg Ladies' Trophy	7,120	indoor	hard	WTA/ATP		
Khalifa International Tennis and Squash Complex	Doha	Qatar	Qatar Open; Qatar Ladies Open	7,000	outdoor	hard	WTA/ATP		
Jockey Club Brasileiro	Rio de Janeiro	Brazil	Rio Open	7,000	outdoor	clay	Combined		
Steffi-Graf-Stadion	Berlin	Germany	German Open (WTA)	7,000	outdoor	grass	WTA		
Nassau Veterans Memorial Coliseum	Uniondale, New York	United States	New York Open	6,500	indoor	hard	ATP		
Buenos Aires Lawn Tennis Club	Buenos Aires	Argentina	ATP Buenos Aires	6,250	outdoor	clay	ATP		
Porsche Arena	Stuttgart	Germany	Porsche Tennis Grand Prix	6,100	indoor	clay	WTA		
Fairmont Acapulco Princess	Acapulco	Mexico	Mexican Open	6,000	outdoor	hard	Combined		
Sichuan International Tennis Center – Center Court	Chengdu	China	Chengdu Open	6,000	outdoor	hard	ATP		
Tennis stadium Kitzbühel	Kitzbühel	Austria	Austrian Open Kitzbühel	5,800	outdoor	clay	ATP		
SDAT Tennis Stadium	Chennai	India	Chennai Open	5,800	outdoor	hard	Combined		
Intersport Arena	Linz	Austria	Generali Ladies Linz	5,699			WTA		
Pat Rafter Arena	Brisbane	Australia	Brisbane International; 2032 Summer Olympics	5,500	outdoor, retractable roof	hard	Combined		
Tennis Club Weissenhof	Stuttgart	Germany	Mercedes Cup	5,500	outdoor	grass	ATP		
Hard Rock Grandstand Court	Miami	United States	Miami Masters (2019–present)	5,191	outdoor	hard	Combined		
True Arena Hua Hin – Center Court	Hua Hin	Thailand	Hua Hin Championships	5,088	outdoor	hard	WTA		
R. K. Khanna Tennis Complex	New Delhi	India	Delhi Open	5,015	outdoor	hard	Combined		
Lindner Family Tennis Center – Grandstand	Mason	United States	Cincinnati Open	5,000	outdoor	hard	Combined		Elina Svitolina serving against Aryna Sablenka at Grandstand on August 16, 2024
Dubai Tennis Stadium	Dubai	UAE	Dubai Tennis Championships	5,000	outdoor	hard	WTA/ATP		
Arenele BNR	Bucharest	Romania	Bucharest Open, BRD Năstase Țiriac Trophy (1993–2016)	5,000	outdoor	clay	WTA/ATP		
Qizhong Forest Sports City Grand Stand Court 2	Shanghai	China	Shanghai Masters	5,000	outdoor	hard	ATP		
Kungliga tennishallen	Stockholm	Sweden	Stockholm Open	5,000			ATP		
Båstad Tennis Stadium	Båstad	Sweden	Swedish Open	5,000			WTA/ATP		
Melbourne Park – Show Court Arena	Melbourne	Australia	Australian Open	5,000	outdoor	hard	WTA/ATP		
Hengqin International Tennis Center	Zhuhai	China	Zhuhai Championships	5,000	outdoor	hard	WTA/ATP		
Memorial Drive	Adelaide	Australia	Adelaide International	5,000	outdoor	hard	WTA/ATP		
Court Simonne Mathieu	Paris	France	French Open	5,000	outdoor	clay	Combined		
Grand Stand	Rome	Italy	Italian Open	5,000	outdoor	clay	Combined		
Abu Dhabi International Tennis Centre	Abu Dhabi	UAE	Abu Dhabi Open	5,000	outdoor	hard	WTA		
Arènes de Metz	Metz	France	Moselle Open	4,303	indoor			ATP	
MTTC Iphitos	Munich	Germany	BMW Open	4,300	outdoor	clay	ATP		
Estadio Mario Alberto Kempes	Córdoba	Argentina	Córdoba Open	4,270	outdoor	clay	ATP		
Court Banque Nationale	Montreal	Canada	Canadian Open	4,250	outdoor	hard	WTA/ATP		
Mhalunge Balewadi Tennis Complex	Pune	India	Maharashtra Open	4,200	outdoor	hard	ATP		
Shenzhen Longgang Sports Center	Shenzhen	China	WTA Shenzhen Open; ATP Shenzhen Open (2014–2018)	4,150	outdoor	hard	WTA/ATP		
Lindner Family Tennis Center – Court #3	Mason	United States	Cincinnati Open	4,000	outdoor	hard	Combined		
ATP Stadium Goran Ivanišević	Umag	Croatia	Croatia Open Umag	4,000	outdoor	clay	ATP		
Moon Court	Beijing	China	2008 Summer Olympics; China Open	4,000	outdoor	hard	Combined		
Wimbledon No. 2 Court	London	United Kingdom	The Championships, Wimbledon; 2012 Summer Olympics	4,000	outdoor	grass	Combined		
Nicola Pietrangeli	Rome	Italy	Italian Open	3,720	outdoor	clay	Combined		
Victoria Park, Hong Kong	Hong Kong	China	Hong Kong Tennis Classic; Hong Kong Open	3,607	outdoor	hard	ATP/WTA		
Estadio 2: Arantxa Sánchez Vicario	Madrid	Spain	Madrid Open	3,500	outdoor, retractable-roof	clay	Combined		
Tuanbo International Tennis Center	Tianjin	China	Tianjin Open	3,500	outdoor	hard	WTA		
Royal Tennis Club de Marrakech	Marrakech	Morocco	Grand Prix Hassan II	3,500	outdoor	clay	ATP		
ASB Centre	Auckland	New Zealand	ATP Auckland OpenWTA Auckland Open	3,200	outdoor	hard	WTA/ATP		
Newport Casino	Newport	United States	US Natl. Championships (1881–1914); Hall of Fame Championships	3,038	outdoor	grass	ATP		
River Oaks Country Club	Houston	United States	U.S. Men's Clay Court Championships	3,000	outdoor	clay	ATP		
Melbourne Park Show Court 2	Melbourne	Australia	Australian Open	3,000	outdoor	hard	Combined		
Melbourne Park Show Court 3	Melbourne	Australia	Australian Open	3,000	outdoor	hard	Combined		
Baku Tennis Academy Central Court	Baku	Azerbaijan	Baku Cup	3,000			WTA		
BJK National Tennis Center – Court 17	New York City	United States	US Open	2,500	outdoor	hard	Combined		
Estadio 3	Madrid	Spain	Madrid Open	2,500	outdoor, retractable-roof	clay	Combined		
Hobart International Tennis Centre	Hobart	Australia	Hobart International	2,800	outdoor	hard	WTA		
Roland Garros No. 14 Court (2018)	Paris	France	French Open	2,200	outdoor	clay	Combined		
Lindner Family Tennis Center – Court 10	Mason	United States	Cincinnati Open	2,000	outdoor	hard	Combined		
Qizhong Forest Sports City Court 3	Shanghai	China	Shanghai Masters	2,000	outdoor	hard	ATP		
Brad Drewett Court	Beijing	China	2008 Summer Olympics; China Open	2,000	outdoor	hard	Combined		
Wimbledon No. 3 Court	London	United Kingdom	The Championships, Wimbledon	2,000	outdoor	grass	Combined		
Guangdong Olympic Tennis Centre – Court 1	Guangzhou	China	Guangzhou International Women's Open (2015–18)	1,845	outdoor	hard	WTA		

=== Davis Cup and Federation Cup venues ===
Below is a list of, arenas, stadiums, and courts that have held a World Group match in either the Davis Cup or the Fed Cup (including world group playoffs), but that have not appeared on either the ATP or WTA tours.

Rank	Stadium	Tennis event capacity	City	Country	Tournament hosted	Source
1	Stade Pierre-Mauroy	27,448	Villeneuve-d'Ascq	France	2014 Davis Cup final, 2017 Davis Cup final	
2	Estadio de La Cartuja	27,200	Seville	Spain	2004 Davis Cup final, 2011 Davis Cup final	
3	White City Stadium	25,578	Sydney	Australia	1954 Davis Cup final	
4	Las Ventas	23,798	Madrid	Spain	2008 Davis Cup semifinal	
5	Belgrade Arena	23,000	Belgrade	Serbia	2007 Davis Cup World Group play-offs; 2010 Davis Cup final	
6	Palexpo	18,400	Geneva	Switzerland	2013 Davis Cup, 2014 Davis Cup	
7	O2 Arena (Prague)	17,000	Prague	Czech Republic	2007 Davis Cup World Group play-offs	
8	Palau Sant Jordi	16,500	Barcelona	Spain	2000 Davis Cup final; 2009 Davis Cup final	
9	Barclaycard Arena	15,800	Birmingham	United Kingdom	2016 Davis Cup	
10	Estadio Mary Terán de Weiss	15,500	Buenos Aires	Argentina	2006 Davis Cup semifinal	
11	Tauron Arena Kraków	15,328	Kraków	Poland	2015 Fed Cup	
12	Palacio de Deportes de Santander	14,000	Santander	Spain	2000 Davis Cup semifinal	
13	Flanders Expo	13,000	Ghent	Belgium	2015 Davis Cup final	
14	Memorial Coliseum	12,000	Portland, Oregon	United States	2007 Davis Cup final	
15	Menora Mivtachim Arena	10,383	Tel Aviv	Israel	Davis Cup ties	
16	Public Auditorium	11,500	Cleveland	United States	1973 Davis Cup final	
17	Mediolanum Forum	11,200	Milan	Italy	1998 Davis Cup final	
18	Sears Centre	11,000	Hoffman Estates, Illinois	United States	2014 Davis Cup	
19	Queensland Sport and Athletics Centre	10,000	Brisbane	Australia	1999 Davis Cup semifinal	
20	Polideportivo Islas Malvinas	9,800	Mar del Plata	Argentina	2008 Davis Cup Final	
21	Commonwealth Arena	8,200	Glasgow	United Kingdom	2015 Davis Cup	
22	Petco Park	8,000	San Diego	United States	2014 Davis Cup	
23	Patinódromo Municipal	8,000	Mar del Plata	Argentina	2014 Davis Cup	
24	Bill Graham Civic Auditorium	7,000	San Francisco	United States	1974 Davis Cup final	
25	Anita Lizana Court at Estadio Nacional	6,300	Santiago	Chile	1976 Davis Cup final	
26	Canada Stadium	6,000	Ramat Hasharon	Israel	Davis Cup	
27	Peugeot Arena	4,500	Bratislava	Slovakia	2005 Davis Cup final, 2025 Billie Jean King Cup qualifying round	
28	Lokomotyv Palace of Sports	2,574	Kharkiv	Ukraine	2010 Fed Cup	
29	Idrottens Hus	2,400	Helsingborg	Sweden	2001 Davis Cup; 2003 Davis Cup; 2009 Davis Cup	

The highest ever attendance record for an internationally-sanctioned competition tennis match.

== Former tennis venues ==
This is a list of stadiums that no longer host regular professional tennis tournaments in the men's or women's tour (ATP/WTA), but have done so in the past.

Stadium	Capacity	City	Country	Tournament hosted	Source
Sportpaleis	18,500	Antwerp	Belgium	Diamond Games	
Sydney SuperDome	18,200	Sydney	Australia	Tennis Masters Cup (2001); ATP Cup	
The O2 Arena	17,500	London	United Kingdom	ATP World Tour Finals (2009–20)	
Sinan Erdem Dome	16,410	Istanbul	Turkey	WTA Championships (2011–13)	
Connecticut Tennis Center Stadium	15,000	New Haven	United States	Connecticut Open	
Putra Indoor Stadium	14,500	Kuala Lumpur	Malaysia	ATP Malaysian Open	
West Side Tennis Club	14,000	New York City	United States	US Open (1923–1977); Forest Hills Tennis Classic	
Tennis Center at Crandon Park	13,300	Key Biscayne	United States	Miami Masters (1987–2018)	
Hallenstadion	13,000	Zürich	Switzerland	Zurich Open	
Telefónica Arena Madrid	12,000	Madrid	Spain	Madrid Masters (2002–08); WTA Championships (2006–07)	
Netaji Indoor Stadium	12,000	Kolkata	India	Sunfeast Open	
Pavilhão Atlântico	12,000	Lisbon	Portugal	ATP World Tour Finals (2000)	
SCC Peterburgsky	12,000	St. Petersburg	Russia	St. Petersburg Open (1995–2013); 1991 St. Petersburg Open (WTA)	
IMPACT Arena	12,000	Bangkok	Thailand	Thailand Open	
Singapore Indoor Stadium	12,000	Singapore	Singapore	WTA Finals	
Spodek	11,500	Katowice	Poland	Katowice Open	
Olympic Stadium	11,400	Moscow	Russia	Kremlin Cup	
HP Pavilion at San Jose	11,386	San Jose, California	United States	SAP Open	
Arena Sofia	10,500	Sofia	Bulgaria	WTA Tournament of Champions (2012–14); Sofia Open (2016-2023)	
Indianapolis Tennis Center	10,000	Indianapolis	United States	Indianapolis Tennis Championships	
Maria Esther Bueno Court	10,000	Rio de Janeiro	Brazil	2016 Summer Olympics	
National Tennis Centre	10,000	Toronto	Canada	Canadian Open	
Tokyo Metropolitan Gymnasium	10,000	Tokyo	Japan	Pan Pacific Open (1984–2008)	
Beijing Tennis Center	10,000	Beijing	China	China Open (2004–2008)	
SRPC Milan Gale Muškatirović	9,000	Belgrade	Serbia	Serbia Open	
Athens Olympic Tennis Centre	8,600	Athens	Greece	2004 Summer Olympics	
Burswood Dome	8,000	Perth	Australia	Hopman Cup	
Home Depot Center	8,000	Carson, California	United States	LA Women's Tennis Championships; East west bank classic	
Stone Mountain Tennis Center	7,200	Atlanta	United States	1996 Summer Olympics	
Dom Sportova	7,000	Zagreb	Croatia	Zagreb Indoors	
Palais des Sports de Gerland	6,500	Lyon	France	Grand Prix de Tennis de Lyon	
Fairmont Scottsdale Princess Tennis Club	6,300	Scottsdale, Arizona	United States	ATP Scottsdale Classic (1987–2005)	
Memorial Drive Park	6,000	Adelaide	Australia	Next Generation Adelaide International	
L'Àgora (Ciutat de les Arts i les Ciències)	6,000	Valencia	Spain	Valencia Open 500	
Los Angeles Tennis Center	5,800	Los Angeles	United States	Countrywide Classic; 1984 Olympics	
SDAT Tennis Stadium	5,800	Chennai	India	Chennai Open	
Complexe Al Amal	5,500	Casablanca	Morocco	Grand Prix Hassan II (1984–2015)	
Racquet Park at Amelia Island Plantation	5,390	Amelia Island, Florida	United States	Bausch & Lomb Championships	
Westside Tennis Club	5,240	Houston, Texas	United States	U.S. Men's Clay Court Championships (2001–2007); ATP World Tour Finals (2003, 2004)	
Racquet Club of Memphis	5,200	Memphis	United States	Memphis Open	
Kooyong Stadium	5,000	Melbourne	Australia	Australian Open; Kooyong Classic	
Memorial Drive Park	5,000	Adelaide	Australia	World Tennis Challenge	
Sportlokaal Bokkeduinen	5,000	Amersfoort	Netherlands	Dutch Open – Combined	
Utsubo Tennis Center Center Court	5,000	Osaka	Japan	Japan Women's Open	
Guangzhou International Tennis Center	5,000	Guangzhou	China	Guangzhou International Women's Open (2009–10)	
Warszawianka Courts	4,500	Warsaw	Poland	Orange Warsaw Open	
Legia Tennis Centre	4,000	Warsaw	Poland	Warsaw Open	
Darling Tennis Center	3,500	Las Vegas, Nevada	United States	Tennis Channel Open	
Római Teniszakadémia	3,000	Budapest	Hungary	Budapest Grand Prix	
Guangzhou Tianhe Sports Center – Tennis Stadium	2,000	Guangzhou	China	Guangzhou International Women's Open (2004–08, 2011–14)	
Sea Pines Racquet Club	1,800	Hilton Head, South Carolina	United States	Family Circle Cup (1973–2000)	
Werzer Arena	1,600	Pörtschach	Austria	Hypo Group Tennis International	
Athens Lawn Tennis Club	1,500	Athens	Greece	Greek Open	
LTAT National Tennis Development Centre	1,500	Bangkok	Thailand	Thailand Open	
Fitzwilliam Lawn Tennis Club	1,000	Dublin	Ireland	Shelbourne Irish Open	

== Other tennis events ==
The highest ever attendance record during a tennis match.

Rank	Stadium	Capacity	Attendance	City	Country	Event hosted	Date	Ref.
1	King Baudouin Stadium	50,024	35,681	Brussels	Belgium	Best of Belgium vs. Best of the World (exhibition)	8 July 2010	
2	Reliant Astrodome	46,000	30,472	Houston	United States	Battle of the Sexes (exhibition)	20 September 1973	
3	Plaza de Toros México	42,000	42,517	Mexico City	Mexico	Roger Federer vs. Alexander Zverev (exhibition)	23 November 2019	
4	Mall of Asia Arena	20,000		Pasay	Philippines	International Premier Tennis League	2014	
5	Dubai Sports Complex	15,000		Dubai	UAE	International Premier Tennis League	2014	
5	Indira Gandhi Arena	15,000		New Delhi	India	International Premier Tennis League	2014	
7	Perth Arena	14,025		Perth	Australia	Hopman Cup	2013–2019	
8	Singapore Indoor Stadium	12,000		Singapore		International Premier Tennis League	2014	
9	Balearic Islands Velodrome	8106		Palma de Mallorca	Spain	Battle of Surfaces (exhibition)	2 May 2007	
7	Tennis arena Štvanice	8000		Prague	Czech Republic	I.ČLTK Prague Open	1991–present	
10	Circolo della Stampa	7000		Turin	Italy	Sporting Challenger	2002–2011	

== See also ==
- Lists of stadiums
- List of tennis venues
- List of stadiums by capacity
- List of American football stadiums by capacity
- List of football (soccer) stadiums by capacity
