= Copa Peugeot Argentina de Tenis =

Defunct tennis tournament
- Founded: 2003
- Abolished: 2012
- Location: Buenos Aires; Argentina
- Venue: Buenos Aires Lawn Tennis Club
- Surface: Hard
- Draw: 6S
- Prize money: US$250,000
- Website: Official Page

The Copa Peugeot Argentina de Tenis (sponsored by Peugeot) was a professional tennis exhibition. Which follows round robin format, split into two groups, before a final between the group winners. It was played on hard courts. It used to be held annually in December at the Buenos Aires Lawn Tennis Club in Buenos Aires, Argentina, since 2003 to 2012.

== Past finals ==
Year	Champion	Runner-up	Score
2012	(Spain) Nicolás Almagro	(Argentina) Juan Mónaco	7–5, 6–2
2011	(Cyprus) Marcos Baghdatis	(France) Gaël Monfils	4–6, 7–6, 7–5
2010	(Argentina) David Nalbandian	(Argentina) Juan Mónaco	7–6, 6–3
2009	(Argentina) David Nalbandian	(Cyprus) Marcos Baghdatis	6–4, 6–4
2008	(Argentina) Juan Mónaco	(Argentina) Gastón Gaudio	7–6, 7–6
2007	(Argentina) David Nalbandian	(Argentina) Juan Mónaco	6–4, 7–5
2006	(Argentina) Guillermo Cañas	(Chile) Nicolás Massú	6–2, 6–2
2005	(Argentina) David Nalbandian	(Argentina) Agustín Calleri	3–6, 6–2, 6–3
2004	(Argentina) Gastón Gaudio	(Argentina) David Nalbandian	4–6, 6–4, 6–2
2003	(Argentina) Guillermo Cañas	(Argentina) Edgardo Massa	6–2, 6–2
