= Buenos Aires Lawn Tennis Club =

Sports club in Argentina

Coordinates: 34.562008°S 58.431323°W

- Short name: Lawn Tennis
- Sport: Tennis
- Founded: April 19, 1892; 134 years ago
- Based in: Buenos Aires
- Location: Argentina
- Stadium: Horacio Billoch Caride
- Chairman: Luis Diez
- Affiliation: AAT
- Website: baltc.net

The Buenos Aires Lawn Tennis Club is a private tennis club in the Palermo neighborhood of Buenos Aires, Argentina. It hosts the ATP Buenos Aires, an ATP Tour tournament played on clay. The club is a founding member of the Argentine Tennis Association, established 2 September 1921, along with Quilmes, Ferrocarril del Sud, GEBA, Lomas, Belgrano, Ferro Carril Oeste, and Estudiantes BA and 12 other institutions.

Its main stadium court, Horacio Billoch Caride Stadium, has a capacity of 5,500. It was named after former club president Horacio Billoch Caride, who is considered one of the most notable tennis executives and who also presided over the Argentine Tennis Association. The stadium has hosted numerous Davis Cup and Fed Cup events.

== History ==
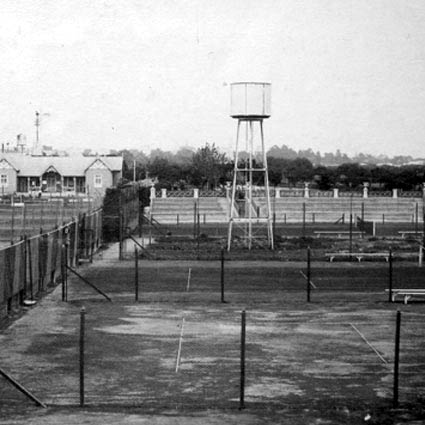
Club house of the club in 1892

The first recorded plans for a tennis club in Buenos Aires can be found on a letter sent by Arthur Herbert, W. H. Watson, Adrián Penard, C.R. Thursby, H. M. Mills, and F. E. Wallace, who proposed the idea to the British community living in Argentina. At the first meeting, held in the British Consulate, Penard offered land he owned on Alvear and Callao Avenues, and suggested the name "Alvear Lawn Tennis Club".

When the initiative received approval from other members, they formed a committee, which concluded that the Alvear Avenue would accommodate only two courts. As a result, they chose a parcel at Vicente López and Ayacucho Streets, owned by Federico Leloir. The club was officially founded on April 19, with Arthur Herbert as president. With the money earned from fees, the club built four courts, a clothing shop, and other facilities.

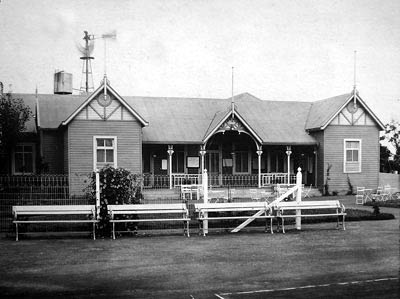
The club moved to Palermo in 1920

When members of the Rosario Lawn Tennis Club in Rosario, Santa Fe heard about the new club in Buenos Aires, they suggested a match between eight players from both cities. The match, the first held at BALTC, was held on June 29, 1892.

As BALTC's membership and activities increased, it decided to move to a bigger place. After considering several locations, the committee was granted concession for land adjacent to Central Argentine Railway's golf course (now Lisandro de la Torre). After the land was reconditioned, the club built four courts there. The new facilities were inaugurated on June 12, 1920, and the club has remained there since.

== Stadium ==
BALTC's stadium and main court is Horacio Billoch Caride Stadium, with a capacity of 5,500. Since 2003, the club has also hosted an exhibition tournament, La copa Argentina de tenis Peugeot (Peugeot Argentina Tennis Cup). Held each December, it features top tour players. During the event, the stadium's surface is hard court instead of the usual clay.

In 2015, there was a proposal to rename the Billoch Caride Stadium to Guillermo Vilas Stadium, to honor the best Argentine player ever, who began his career at BALTC at 15 years old. Vilas also debuted for the Argentine team that competed with Chile in the South American zone of the 1970 Davis Cup, which was held in BALTC. However, the initiative did not succeed.

In 2018, BALTC was the venue for all the tennis tournaments at the 2018 Youth Olympic Games, first time the court hosted an Olympic competition.

=== Gallery ===
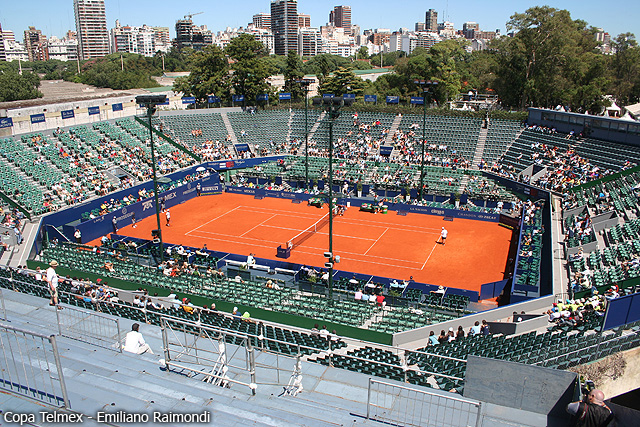
Aerial view

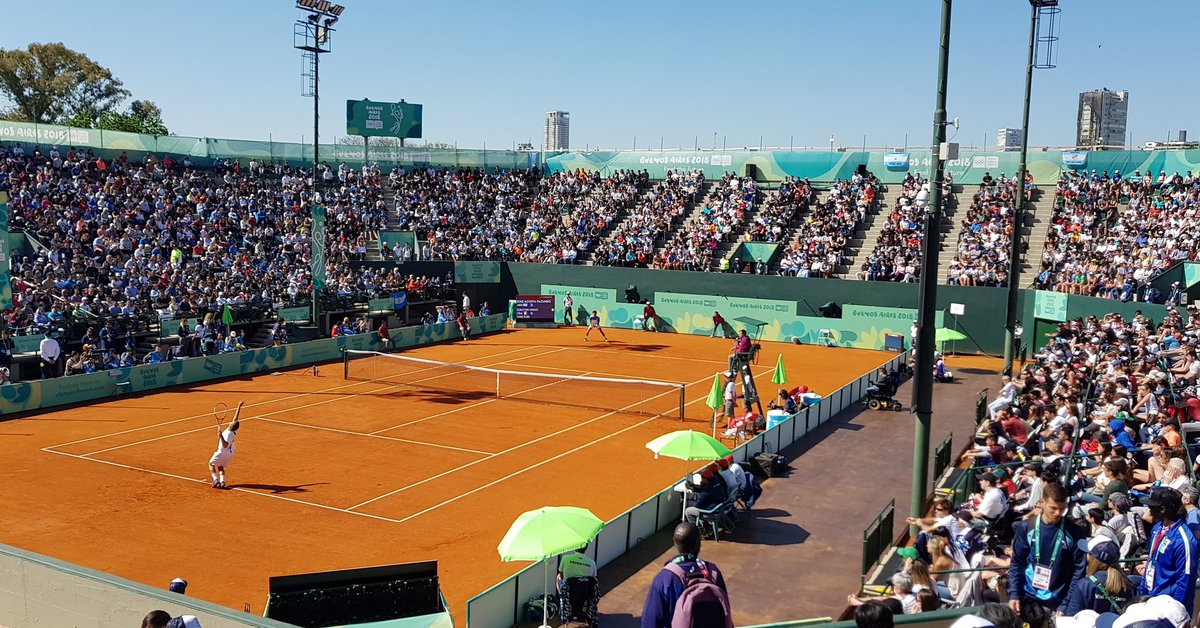
Main court

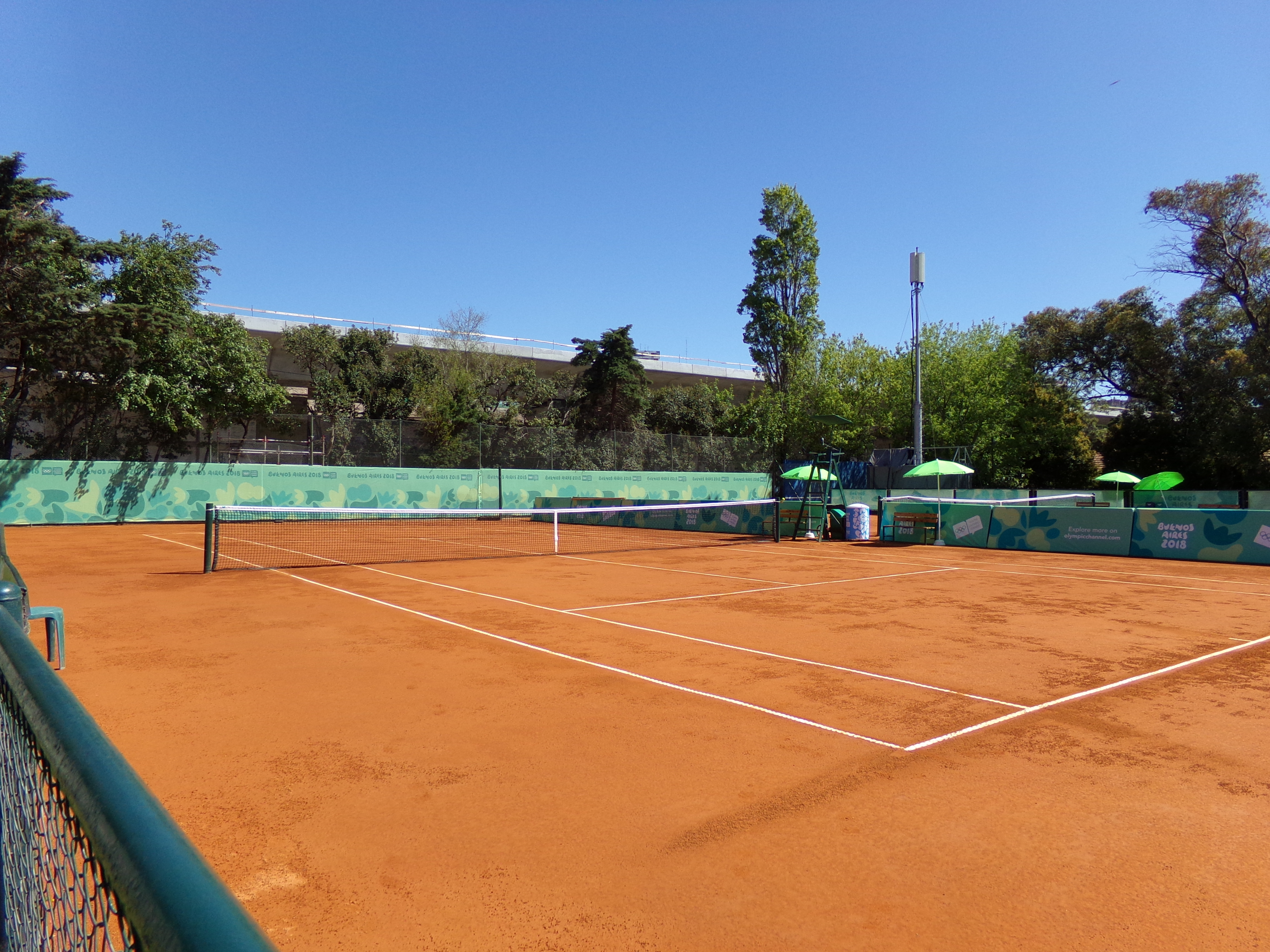
Secondary court

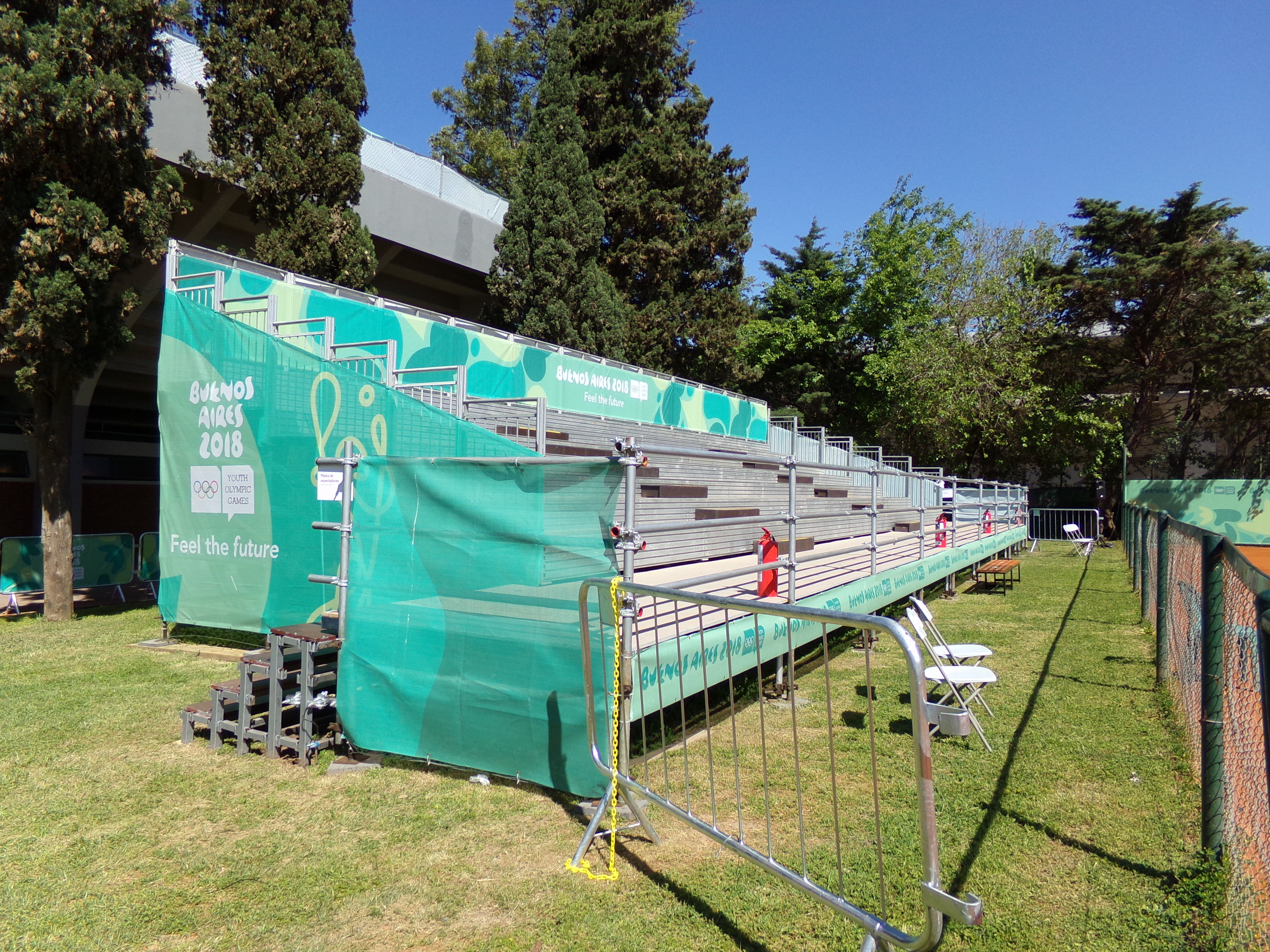
Stadium grandstand

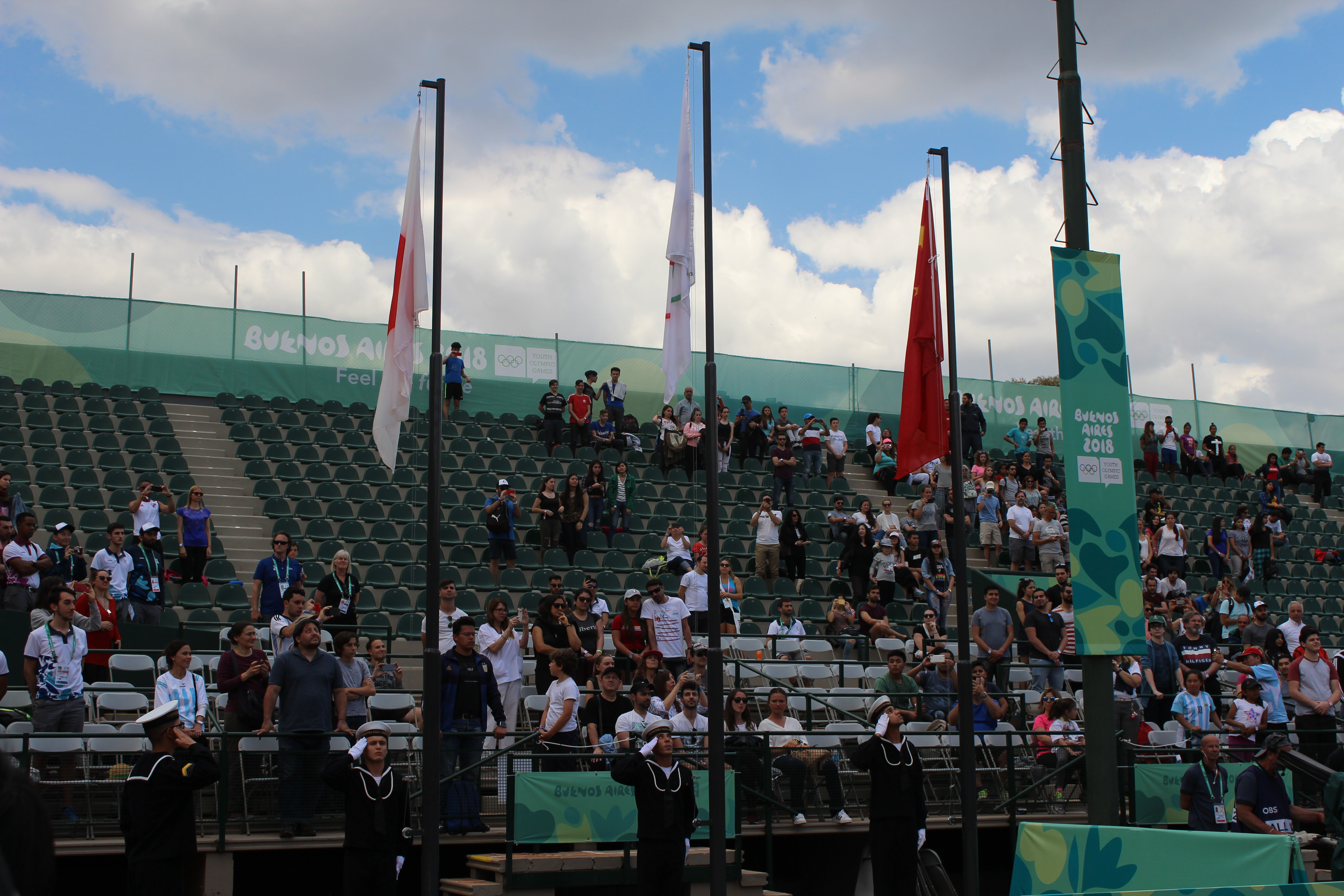
2018 Youth Olympics

== Former notable tournaments ==
- River Plate Championships (1893-1998)

== See also ==
- List of tennis stadiums by capacity
