= Athens Olympic Sports Complex =

Sports facility in Greece

Coordinates: 38°02′19″N 23°47′09″E

Olympic Athletic Center of Athens
- OACA

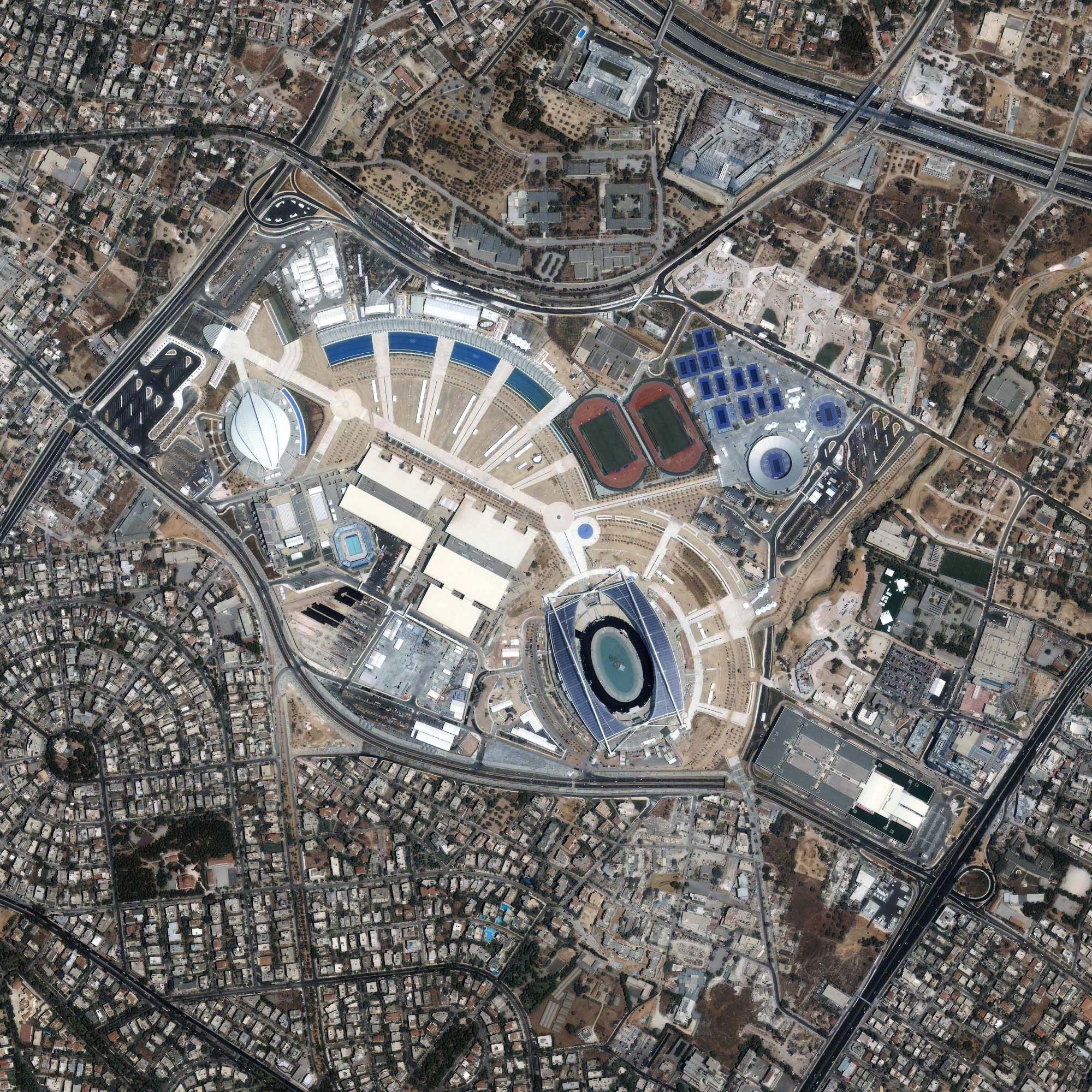
- Interactive map of Olympic Athletic Center of Athens
- Full name: Olympic Athletic Center of Athens "Spiros Louis"
- Location: Marousi, Greece
- Owner: Greek Government

Construction
- Renovated: 2000–2004 (Olympic Games)
- Architect: Santiago Calatrava (Renovation)

Website
- oaka.com.gr

The Olympic Athletic Center of Athens Spiros Louis (Greek: Ολυμπιακό Αθλητικό Κέντρο Αθηνών "Σπύρος Λούης", Olympiakó Athlitikó Kéntro Athinón "Spýros Loúis") or OACA (OAKA)), is a sports complex located in Marousi, Athens. The complex consists of five major venues as well as other supplementary sport facilities.

The complex has hosted the Mediterranean Games in 1991, the World Championship in Athletics in 1997 as well as other important athletic and cultural events. Most notably, the complex was the main venue for the 2004 Summer Olympics. The complex was revamped for the games under a design produced by the Spanish architect Santiago Calatrava.

== Venues ==
=== Spyros Louis Athens Olympic Stadium ===
The stadium, built in 1982 and extensively refurbished for the games in 2004, including the addition of a roof, hosted the athletics events and the soccer final, as well as the Opening Ceremony on August 13, 2004 and the Closing Ceremony on August 29, 2004.The venue also hosted the same events during the 2004 Summer Paralympics.

Spyros Louis Athens Olympic Stadium

Athens Olympic Stadium during maintenance

=== Nikos Galis Olympic Indoor Hall ===
Nikos Galis Olympic Indoor Hall

The Nikos Galis Olympic Indoor Hall (also known simply as the Indoor Hall) was completed in 1995, and was the largest indoor venue in use for sporting events at the 2004 Summer Olympics in Athens, Greece. It is part of the Athens Olympic Sports Complex, in the suburb of Maroussi. The arena was used for artistic gymnastics and trampolining and also hosted the finals of the basketball matches at the games. On May 18 and 20, 2006, the Olympic Indoor Hall hosted the 51st Eurovision Song Contest, that was held in Athens after Greece's victory at the Song Contest in 2005.

=== Athens Olympic Aquatic Centre ===
The outdoor pool of the Athens Olympic Aquatic Centre

The indoor pool of the Athens Olympic Aquatic Centre

The outdoor pool during the 2004 Summer Olympics

=== Athens Olympic Velodrome ===
Outside the Athens Olympic Velodrome

Outside the Athens Olympic Velodrome

=== Athens Olympic Tennis Centre ===
The main court of the Athens Olympic Tennis Centre

== Transportation to and from the venue ==
The Athens Olympic Sports Complex can be reached by Metro [stations "Neratziotissa" and "Irini" of Metro Line 1 (Green Line)], by suburban train (Proastiakos station "Neratziotissa"), or by direct bus lines [A7 (Stournari – Kifissia), 602 (N. Ionia – Kalogreza – Panormou Metro Station), 550 (P. Faliro – Kifissia).

== Legacy ==
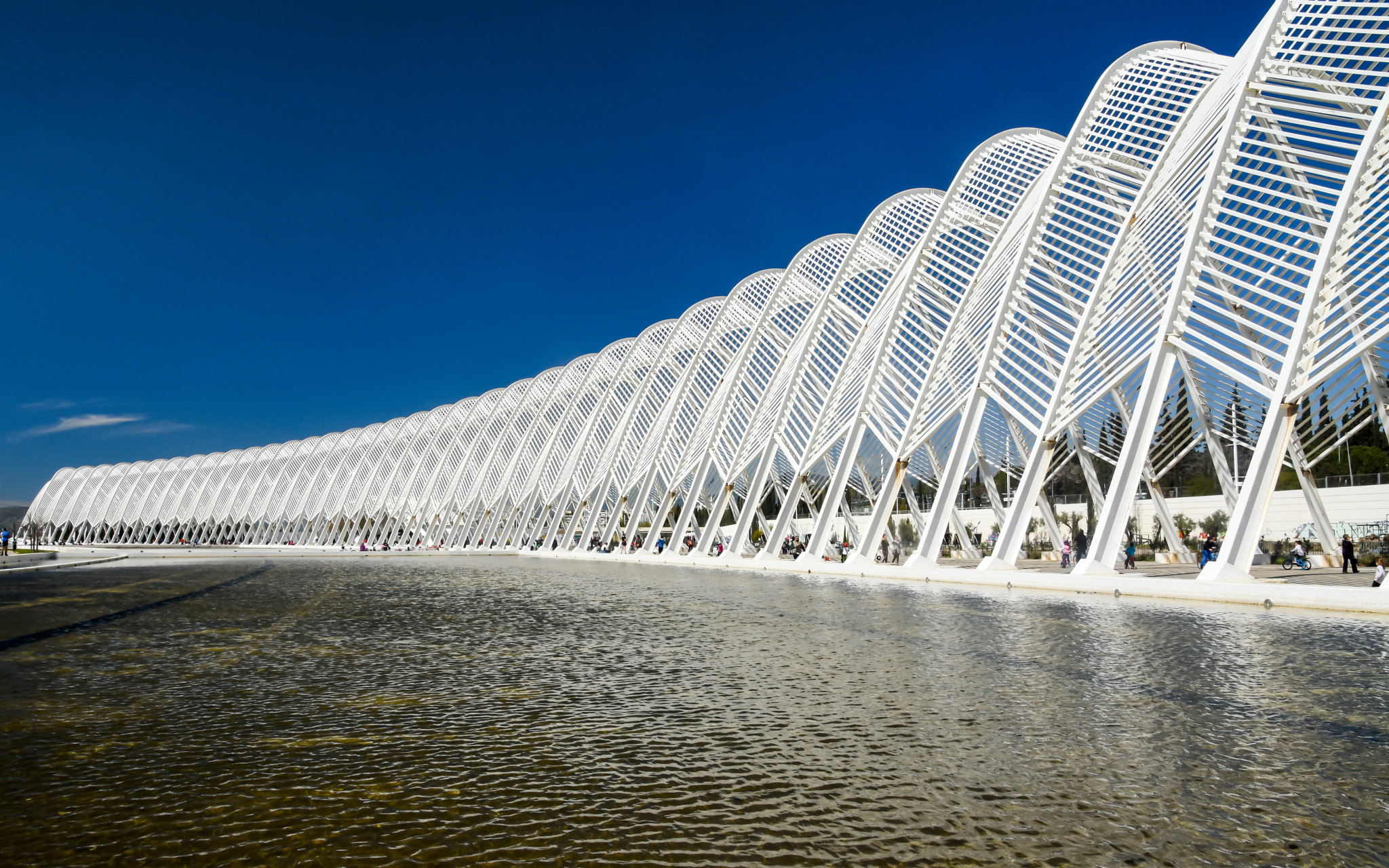
Inside the Olympic Sports Complex

While it was reported in 2008 that almost all of the Olympic venues utilized for the 2004 games, including certain facilities in the Sports Complex such as the velodrome and tennis center, have fallen into varying states of dereliction or disrepair, all of the facilities in the Athens Olympic Sports Complex are still in use today.

The table below illustrates how the Athens Olympic Sports Complex facilities are used today:

| Facility | Olympics use | Current use |
|---|---|---|
| Athens Olympic Stadium (OAKA) | Opening and closing ceremonies, track and field, football | Home pitch for Panathinaikos F.C. (football; Super League Greece, UEFA Champions League), Greece national football team (some matches), international football competitions (e.g. the 2007 UEFA Champions League Final); track and field events (e.g. IAAF Athens Grand Prix), concerts |
| Nikos Galis Olympic Indoor Hall | Basketball, gymnastics | Home court for Panathinaikos B.C. (Greek BasketBall League, EuroLeague); Greece men's national basketball team (Acropolis Tournament), International basketball competitions (e.g. the EuroLeague Final of Athens 2007, Eurovision 2006, and the 2008 FIBA Olympic Men's Basketball Qualifying Tournament,) Concerts |
| Athens Olympic Aquatic Centre | Swimming, diving, synchronized swimming, water polo | Domestic and international swimming meets, public pool |
| Athens Olympic Tennis Centre (The Main Court) | Tennis | Domestic and international tennis matches, Status Athens Open |
| Athens Olympic Velodrome | Cycling | Domestic and international cycling meets |

== Sources ==
- 2004 Summer Olympics official report. Volume 2. pp. 201, 207, 227, 231, 242, 273, 303, 324, 329, 346, 409.
