= Palmetto Tennis Center =

National Tennis Court in Palmetto Park in Sumter, South Carolina

Coordinates: 33°56′12″N 80°22′47″W

Palmetto Tennis Center (PTC) is a National Tennis Court in Palmetto Park in Sumter, South Carolina.

PTC has 18 lit hard courts as well as six Deco-Turf courts. It hosts several tournaments every year, both junior and adult. PTC is also the host of the Palmetto Pro Open, a women's 25K event on the USTA Pro Circuit.
