= Darling Tennis Center =

Tennis center in Las Vegas, Nevada

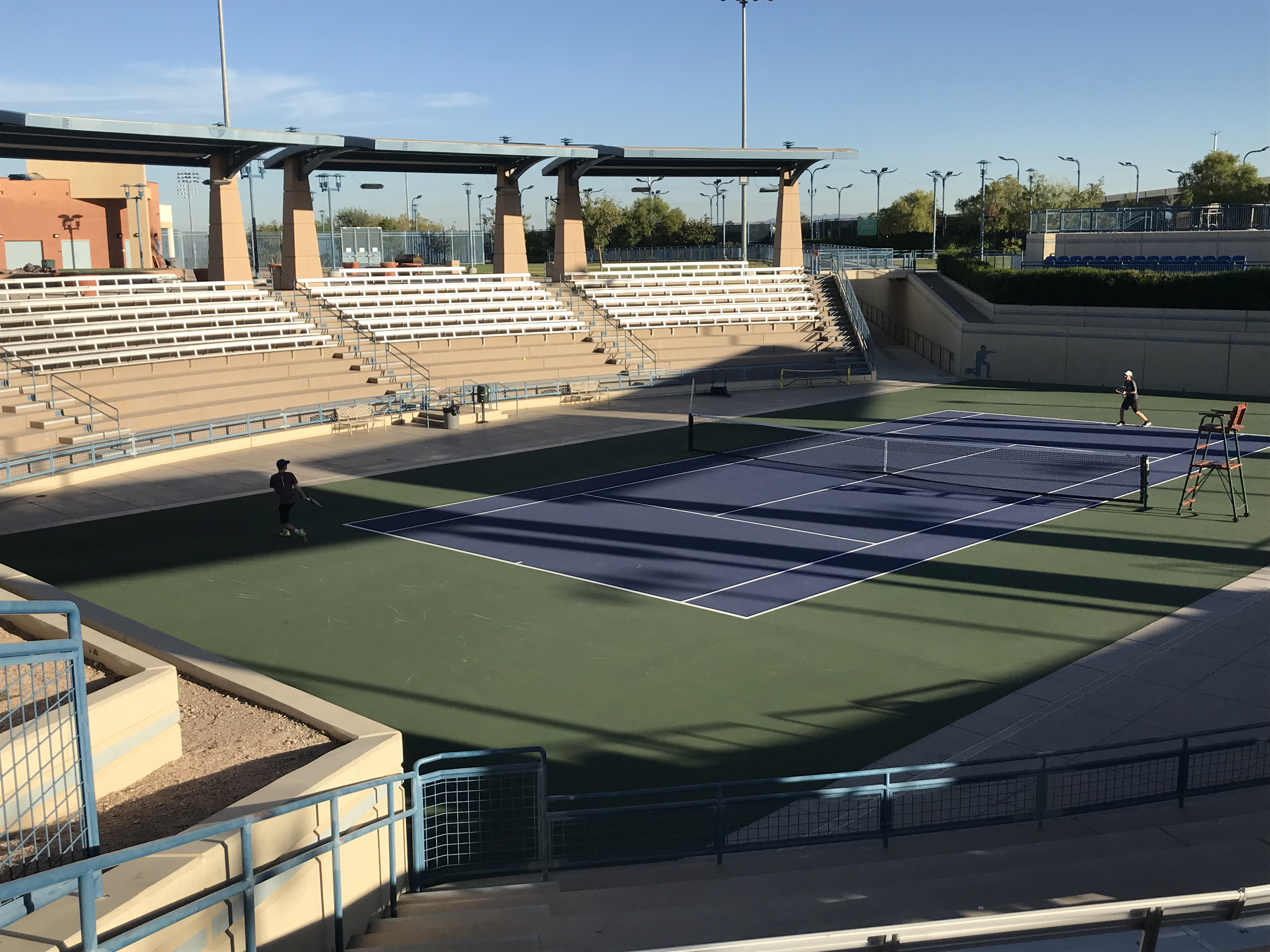

- Location in Nevada Location in the United States Location in North America
- Interactive map of Darling Tennis Center
- Address: 7901 West Washington Avenue
- Location: Las Vegas, Nevada, U.S.
- Coordinates: 36.1799°N 115.2766°W
- Owner: City of Las Vegas
- Operator: City of Las Vegas
- Capacity: 3,000
- Surface: Hard

Construction
- Groundbreaking: 2004; 22 years ago
- Opened: 2005; 21 years ago

Tenants
- Tennis Channel Open (Tennis) (2006–2008); Faith Lutheran Crusaders (2010–2021)

The Darling Tennis Center (DTC) or the Amanda and Stacy Darling Tennis Center is a multi court facility completed in 2005 that is used for community activities and junior to senior tournaments for the Association of Tennis Professionals and the USTA. The courts are owned and operated by the City of Las Vegas as part of the Charlie Kellogg and Joe Zaher Sports Complex. In 2019, a new indoor clay court complex has been planned to be built in the future.

The center was the home to the Tennis Channel Open and is the largest tennis center in the state of Nevada.

== Facilities ==
- Stadium court
- 23 total courts (3 being converted to clay)
- Future indoor center
- Pro shop
- Restaurant

== See also ==
- List of tennis stadiums by capacity
