= Japan at the 2004 Summer Olympics =

- IOC code: JPN
- NOC: Japanese Olympic Committee
- Website: www.joc.or.jp (in Japanese and English)

in Athens
- Competitors: 312 (141 men and 171 women) in 26 sports
- Flag bearer: Kyoko Hamaguchi
- Medals Ranked 5th: Gold 16 Silver 9 Bronze 12 Total 37

Summer Olympics appearances (overview)
- 1912; 1920; 1924; 1928; 1932; 1936; 1948; 1952; 1956; 1960; 1964; 1968; 1972; 1976; 1980; 1984; 1988; 1992; 1996; 2000; 2004; 2008; 2012; 2016; 2020; 2024; 2028

Japan competed at the 2004 Summer Olympics in Athens, Greece, from 13 to 29 August 2004. Japanese athletes have competed at every Summer Olympic Games in the modern era since 1912 except for two editions; it was not invited to the 1948 Summer Olympics in London for its role in World War II, and was also part of the US-led boycott of the 1980 Summer Olympics in Moscow. For the first time in its Olympic history, Japan was represented by more female than male athletes as the Japanese Olympic Committee sent a total of 312 athletes, 141 men and 171 women, to compete in 26 sports.

Japan left Athens with a total of 37 medals (16 gold, 9 silver, and 12 bronze), finishing fifth in the overall medal rankings. This was also the nation's most successful Olympics, winning the largest number of gold and overall medals in non-boycotting games and surpassing three gold medals short of the 1956 Summer Olympics in Melbourne. Ten of these medals were awarded to the athletes in judo, eight in swimming, six in wrestling, four in gymnastics, and two each in athletics and synchronized swimming. Eight Japanese athletes won more than a single Olympic medal in Athens. Japan's team-based athletes came strong and successful in Athens, as the baseball and softball teams managed to produce two bronze medals.

Among the nation's medalists were freestyle wrestlers Saori Yoshida and Kaori Icho, who both claimed their gold medals in women's wrestling for the first time, and judoka Tadahiro Nomura and Ryoko Tani, who both successfully defended Olympic titles in their respective classes. Swimmer Kosuke Kitajima became the most successful Japanese athlete in these games, striking a breaststroke double with two golds and adding a bronze to his career hardware for the team in men's medley relay. Meanwhile, synchronized swimmers Miya Tachibana and Miho Takeda managed to repeat their silver medals from Sydney in both women's duet and team routines. Takehiro Kashima, Hiroyuki Tomita, and Isao Yoneda claimed two individual medals each in men's artistic gymnastics, including their coveted gold in the team all-around.

On August 29, 2004, the International Olympic Committee stripped off Hungary's Adrián Annus hammer throw title after failing the doping test, and the gold medal was subsequently awarded to Koji Murofushi at the conclusion of the Games, making him the nation's first ever Olympic champion in the field event.

== Medalists ==
Medal	Name	Sport	Event	Date
Gold	Tadahiro Nomura	Judo	Men's 60 kg	August 14
Gold	Ryoko Tani	Judo	Women's 48 kg	August 14
Gold	Masato Uchishiba	Judo	Men's 66 kg	August 15
Gold	Kosuke Kitajima	Swimming	Men's 100 m breaststroke	August 15
Gold	Takehiro Kashima; Hisashi Mizutori; Daisuke Nakano; Hiroyuki Tomita; Naoya Tsukahara; Isao Yoneda	Gymnastics	Men's artistic team all-around	August 16
Gold	Ayumi Tanimoto	Judo	Women's 63 kg	August 17
Gold	Masae Ueno	Judo	Women's 70 kg	August 18
Gold	Kosuke Kitajima	Swimming	Men's 200 m breaststroke	August 18
Gold	Noriko Anno	Judo	Women's 78 kg	August 19
Gold	Keiji Suzuki	Judo	Men's +100 kg	August 20
Gold	Maki Tsukada	Judo	Women's +78 kg	August 20
Gold	Ai Shibata	Swimming	Women's 800 m freestyle	August 20
Gold	Koji Murofushi	Athletics	Men's hammer throw	August 22
Gold	Mizuki Noguchi	Athletics	Women's marathon	August 22
Gold	Saori Yoshida	Wrestling	Women's freestyle 55 kg	August 23
Gold	Kaori Icho	Wrestling	Women's freestyle 63 kg	August 23
Silver	Yuki Yokosawa	Judo	Women's 52 kg	August 15
Silver	Takashi Yamamoto	Swimming	Men's 200 m butterfly	August 17
Silver	Hiroshi Izumi	Judo	Men's 90 kg	August 18
Silver	Hiroshi Yamamoto	Archery	Men's individual	August 19
Silver	Toshiaki Fushimi; Masaki Inoue; Tomohiro Nagatsuka	Cycling	Men's team sprint	August 21
Silver	Hiroyuki Tomita	Gymnastics	Men's parallel bars	August 23
Silver	Chiharu Icho	Wrestling	Women's freestyle 48 kg	August 23
Silver	Miya Tachibana; Miho Takeda	Synchronized swimming	Women's duet	August 25
Silver	Michiyo Fujimaru; Saho Harada; Naoko Kawashima; Kanako Kitao; Emiko Suzuki; Miya Tachibana; Miho Takeda; Juri Tatsumi; Yoko Yoneda	Synchronized swimming	Women's team	August 27
Bronze	Tomomi Morita	Swimming	Men's 100 m backstroke	August 16
Bronze	Yuko Nakanishi	Swimming	Women's 200 m butterfly	August 18
Bronze	Reiko Nakamura	Swimming	Women's 200 m backstroke	August 20
Bronze	Kosuke Kitajima; Tomomi Morita; Yoshihiro Okumura; Takashi Yamamoto	Swimming	Men's 4 × 100 m medley relay	August 21
Bronze	Takehiro Kashima	Gymnastics	Men's pommel horse	August 22
Bronze	Emi Inui; Kazue Ito; Yumi Iwabuchi; Masumi Mishina; Emi Naito; Haruka Saito; Hiroko Sakai; Naoko Sakamoto; Rie Sato; Yuki Sato; Juri Takayama; Yukiko Ueno; Reika Utsugi; Eri Yamada; Noriko Yamaji	Softball	Women's tournament	August 23
Bronze	Isao Yoneda	Gymnastics	Men's horizontal bar	August 23
Bronze	Kyoko Hamaguchi	Wrestling	Women's freestyle 72 kg	August 23
Bronze	Ryoji Aikawa; Yuya Ando; Kosuke Fukudome; Hisashi Iwakuma; Hitoki Iwase; Kenji Jojima; Makoto Kaneko; Takuya Kimura; Masahide Kobayashi; Hiroki Kuroda; Daisuke Matsuzaka; Daisuke Miura; Shinya Miyamoto; Arihito Muramatsu; Norihiro Nakamura; Michihiro Ogasawara; Naoyuki Shimizu; Yoshinobu Takahashi; Yoshitomo Tani; Koji Uehara; Kazuhiro Wada; Tsuyoshi Wada	Baseball	Men's tournament	August 25
Bronze	Kazuto Seki; Kenjiro Todoroki	Sailing	Men's 470 class	August 28
Bronze	Chikara Tanabe	Wrestling	Men's freestyle 55 kg	August 28
Bronze	Kenji Inoue	Wrestling	Men's freestyle 60 kg	August 29

Medals by sport
Sport	1st place, gold medalist(s)	2nd place, silver medalist(s)	3rd place, bronze medalist(s)	Total
Judo	8	2	0	10
Swimming	3	1	4	8
Wrestling	2	1	3	6
Athletics	2	0	0	2
Gymnastics	1	1	2	4
Synchronized swimming	0	2	0	2
Archery	0	1	0	1
Cycling	0	1	0	1
Baseball	0	0	1	1
Sailing	0	0	1	1
Softball	0	0	1	1
Total	16	9	12	37

== Archery ==
Three Japanese archers qualified each for the men's and women's individual archery, and a spot each for both men's and women's teams.

Men

Athlete	Event	Ranking round		Round of 64	Round of 32	Round of 16	Quarterfinals	Semifinals	Final / BM	
Athlete	Event	Score	Seed	Opposition Score	Opposition Score	Opposition Score	Opposition Score	Opposition Score	Opposition Score	Rank
Takaharu Furukawa	Individual	646	37	Yong Fj (CHN); W 146–143	Jang Y-H (KOR); L 163–166	Did not advance				
Yuji Hamano	Individual	660	17	Prasad (IND); L 150–155	Did not advance					
Hiroshi Yamamoto	Individual	664	9	Fisseux (FRA); W 155-147	Frangilli (ITA); W 162–154	Serdyuk (UKR); W 168–160	Im D-H (KOR); W 111–110	Cuddihy (AUS); W 115 (10–115) (9)	Galiazzo (ITA); L 109–111	2nd place, silver medalist(s)
Takaharu Furukawa; Yuji Hamano; Hiroshi Yamamoto	Team	1970	5	—N/a		France; W 254–241	Ukraine; L 236–242	Did not advance		

Women

Athlete	Event	Ranking round		Round of 64	Round of 32	Round of 16	Quarterfinals	Semifinals	Final / BM	
Athlete	Event	Score	Seed	Opposition Score	Opposition Score	Opposition Score	Opposition Score	Opposition Score	Opposition Score	Rank
Yukari Kawasaki	Individual	622	37	Marcinkiewicz (POL); L 106–119	Did not advance					
Sayoko Kawauchi	Individual	601	53	Burdeyna (UKR); W 137–129	Williamson (GBR); L 150–154	Did not advance				
Sayami Matsushita	Individual	624	35	Fouace (FRA); W 165–157	Yun M-J (KOR); L 149–173	Did not advance				
Yukari Kawasaki; Sayoko Kawauchi; Sayami Matsushita	Team	1847	14	—N/a		Chinese Taipei; L 226–240	Did not advance			

== Athletics ==
Japanese athletes have so far achieved qualifying standards in the following athletics events (up to a maximum of 3 athletes in each event at the 'A' Standard, and 1 at the 'B' Standard). The team was selected based on the results of the 2004 Japan Championships in Athletics.

Koji Murofushi originally claimed a silver medal in men's hammer throw. On August 29, 2004, the International Olympic Committee stripped off Hungary's Adrián Annus hammer throw title after failing the doping test. Following the announcement of Annus' disqualification, Murofushi's medal was eventually upgraded to gold.

Key

- Note–Ranks given for track events are within the athlete's heat only
- Q = Qualified for the next round
- q = Qualified for the next round as a fastest loser or, in field events, by position without achieving the qualifying target
- NR = National record
- N/A = Round not applicable for the event
- Bye = Athlete not required to compete in round

Men
Track & road events

Athlete	Event	Heat		Quarterfinal		Semifinal		Final	
Athlete	Event	Result	Rank	Result	Rank	Result	Rank	Result	Rank
Shigeru Aburaya	Marathon	—N/a						2:13:11	5
Nobuharu Asahara	100 m	10.33	1 Q	10.24	4	Did not advance			
Tomoaki Kunichika	Marathon	—N/a						2:21:13	42
Ryo Matsuda	200 m	24.59	8	Did not advance					
Masato Naito	110 m hurdles	13.56	5 q	13.54	6	Did not advance			
Ryuji Ono	10000 m	—N/a						29:06.50	19
Ryuji Ono	3000 m steeplechase	8:29.07	6	—N/a				Did not advance	
Jun Osakada	400 m	46.39	5	—N/a		Did not advance			
Mitsuhiro Sato	400 m	46.70	6	—N/a		Did not advance			
Shingo Suetsugu	100 m	10.27	3 Q	10.19	5	Did not advance			
Toshinari Suwa	Marathon	—N/a						2:13:24	6
Shinji Takahira	200 m	21.05	6	Did not advance					
Dai Tamesue	400 m hurdles	48.80	3 Q	—N/a		48.46	3	Did not advance	
Satoru Tanigawa	110 m hurdles	13.39 NR	3 Q	13.70	7	Did not advance			
Takayuki Tanii	20 km walk	—N/a						1:23:38	15
Takayuki Tanii	50 km walk	—N/a						DSQ	
Hiroyasu Tsuchie	100 m	10.37	5	Did not advance					
Yuki Yamaguchi	400 m	46.16	5	—N/a		Did not advance			
Ken Yoshizawa	400 m hurdles	50.95	6	—N/a		Did not advance			
Yuki Yamazaki	20 km walk	—N/a						DNF	
Yuki Yamazaki	50 km walk	—N/a						3:57:00	16
Nobuharu Asahara; Shingo Suetsugu; Shinji Takahira; Hiroyasu Tsuchie	4 × 100 m relay	38.53	5 q	—N/a				38.49	4
Tomohiro Ito; Jun Osakada; Mitsuhiro Sato; Yuki Yamaguchi	4 × 400 m relay	3:02.71	2 Q	—N/a				3:00.99	4

Field events

Athlete	Event	Qualification		Final	
Athlete	Event	Distance	Position	Distance	Position
Yukifumi Murakami	Javelin throw	78.59	18	Did not advance	
Koji Murofushi	Hammer throw	79.55	3 Q	82.91	1st place, gold medalist(s)
Daichi Sawano	Pole vault	5.70	15 Q	5.55	=13
Takanori Sugibayashi	Triple jump	15.95	38	Did not advance	
Shinichi Terano	Long jump	7.70	29	Did not advance	

Women
Track & road events

Athlete	Event	Heat		Semifinal		Final	
Athlete	Event	Result	Rank	Result	Rank	Result	Rank
Kayoko Fukushi	10000 m	—N/a				33:48.66	26
Harumi Hiroyama	10000 m	—N/a				32:15.12	18
Mayumi Kawasaki	20 km walk	—N/a				1:37:56	40
Mizuki Noguchi	Marathon	—N/a				2:26:20	1st place, gold medalist(s)
Megumi Oshima	10000 m	—N/a				31:42.18	13
Naoko Sakamoto	Marathon	—N/a				2:31:43	7
Miho Sugimori	800 m	2:02.82	6	Did not advance			
Reiko Tosa	Marathon	—N/a				2:28:44	5

Field events

Athlete	Event	Qualification		Final	
Athlete	Event	Distance	Position	Distance	Position
Maho Hanaoka	Long jump	6.31	34	Did not advance	
Takayo Kondo	Pole vault	4.15	32	Did not advance	
Chinatsu Mori	Shot put	15.86	31	Did not advance	
Yuka Murofushi	Hammer throw	65.33	27	Did not advance	

Combined events – Heptathlon

Athlete	Event	100H	HJ	SP	200 m	LJ	JT	800 m	Final	Rank
Yuki Nakata	Result	13.94	1.76	11.54	25.76	NM	39.75	2:18.46	4871	28
Yuki Nakata	Points	987	928	631	818	0	662	845	4871	28

== Badminton ==
Men

Athlete	Event	Round of 32	Round of 16	Quarterfinal	Semifinal	Final / BM	
Athlete	Event	Opposition Score	Opposition Score	Opposition Score	Opposition Score	Opposition Score	Rank
Shōji Satō	Singles	Bao Cl (CHN); L 6–15, 5–15	Did not advance				
Hidetaka Yamada	Singles	Hidayat (INA); L 8–15, 10–15	Did not advance				
Keita Masuda; Tadashi Ohtsuka	Doubles	Bye	Cai Y / Fu Hf (CHN); L 7–15, 17–16, 9–15	Did not advance			

Women

Athlete	Event	Round of 32	Round of 16	Quarterfinal	Semifinal	Final / BM	
Athlete	Event	Opposition Score	Opposition Score	Opposition Score	Opposition Score	Opposition Score	Rank
Kaori Mori	Singles	Nieminen (FIN); W 11–5, 11–4	Zhou M (CHN); L 2–11, 4–11	Did not advance			
Miho Tanaka	Singles	Ponsana (INA); L 7–11, 11–5, 8–11	Did not advance				
Kanako Yonekura	Singles	Martin (DEN); L 4–11, 7–11	Did not advance				
Chikako Nakayama; Keiko Yoshitomi	Doubles	Bye	Chankrachangwong / Thungthongkam (THA); L 4–15, 11–15	Did not advance			
Seiko Yamada; Shizuka Yamamoto	Doubles	Chin E H / Wong P T (MAS); L 7–15, 9–15	Did not advance				

Mixed

Athlete	Event	Round of 32	Round of 16	Quarterfinal	Semifinal	Final / BM	
Athlete	Event	Opposition Score	Opposition Score	Opposition Score	Opposition Score	Opposition Score	Rank
Tadashi Ohtsuka; Shizuka Yamamoto	Doubles	Blair / Munt (GBR); L 15–13, 7–15, 13–15	Did not advance				

== Baseball ==
Roster

Manager: 33 – Kiyoshi Nakahata

Coaches: 31 – Yutaka Takagi, 32 – Yutaka Ohno

Pos.	No.	Player	Date of birth (age)	Bats	Throws	Club
OF	1	Kosuke Fukudome	April 26, 1972			(Japan) Chunichi Dragons
IF	2	Michihiro Ogasawara	October 25, 1973			(Japan) Hokkaido Nippon-Ham Fighters
IF	5	Norihiro Nakamura	July 24, 1973			(Japan) Osaka Kintetsu Buffaloes
IF	6	Shinya Miyamoto	November 5, 1970			(Japan) Yakult Swallows
IF	8	Makoto Kaneko	November 8, 1975			(Japan) Hokkaido Nippon-Ham Fighters
C	9	Kenji Johjima	June 8, 1976			(Japan) Fukuoka Daiei Hawks
OF	10	Yoshitomo Tani	February 9, 1973			(Japan) Orix BlueWave
P	11	Naoyuki Shimizu	November 24, 1975			(Japan) Chiba Lotte Marines
P	13	Hitoki Iwase	November 8, 1974			(Japan) Chunichi Dragons
P	15	Hiroki Kuroda	February 15, 1975			(Japan) Hiroshima Toyo Carp
P	16	Yuya Ando	December 27, 1977			(Japan) Hanshin Tigers
P	17	Daisuke Miura	December 25, 1973			(Japan) Yokohama BayStars
P	18	Daisuke Matsuzaka	September 13, 1980			(Japan) Seibu Lions
P	19	Koji Uehara	April 3, 1975			(Japan) Yomiuri Giants
P	20	Hisashi Iwakuma	April 12, 1981			(Japan) Osaka Kintetsu Buffaloes
P	21	Tsuyoshi Wada	February 21, 1981			(Japan) Fukuoka Daiei Hawks
OF	23	Arihito Muramatsu	December 12, 1972			(Japan) Orix BlueWave
OF	24	Yoshinobu Takahashi	April 3, 1975			(Japan) Yomiuri Giants
IF	25	Atsushi Fujimoto	October 4, 1977			(Japan) Hanshin Tigers
OF	27	Takuya Kimura	April 15, 1972			(Japan) Hiroshima Toyo Carp
P	30	Masahide Kobayashi	May 24, 1974			(Japan) Chiba Lotte Marines
OF	55	Kazuhiro Wada	June 19, 1972			(Japan) Seibu Lions
C	59	Ryoji Aikawa	July 11, 1976			(Japan) Yokohama BayStars
P	61	Hirotoshi Ishii	September 14, 1977			(Japan) Yakult Swallows

Preliminary round

Team	W	L	Tiebreaker
Japan	6	1	1-0
Cuba	6	1	0-1
Canada	5	2	-
Australia	4	3	-
Chinese Taipei	3	4	-
Netherlands	2	5	-
Greece	1	6	1-0
Italy	1	6	0-1

Team	1	2	3	4	5	6	7	R	H	E
Japan	2	0	3	1	1	4	1	12	13	0
Italy	0	0	0	0	0	0	0	0	4	0
WP: Koji Uehara (1-0) LP: Anthony Massimino (0-1); Home runs: JPN: N. Nakamura in 3rd, 2 RBIs; K. Fukudome in 4th, 1 RBI; ITA: None

Team	1	2	3	4	5	6	7	8	9	R	H	E
Netherlands	1	2	0	0	0	0	0	0	0	3	4	1
Japan	1	1	0	0	2	0	0	4	x	8	11	1
WP: Hiroki Kuroda (1-0) LP: Diego Markwell (0-1); Home runs: NED: None; JPN: A. Fujimoto in 8th, 2 RBIs

Team	1	2	3	4	5	6	7	8	9	R	H	E
Japan	0	2	0	2	0	0	1	0	1	6	12	2
Cuba	0	0	0	0	0	0	0	0	3	3	7	2
WP: Daisuke Matsuzaka (1-0) LP: Vicyohandri Odelín (0-1) Sv: Hirotoshi Ishii (1S); Home runs: JPN: K. Jojima in 4th, 1 RBI; N. Nakamura in 4th, 1 RBI; K. Wada in 2nd, 2 RBIs; CUB: None

Team	1	2	3	4	5	6	7	8	9	R	H	E
Australia	0	0	0	3	0	0	3	3	0	9	15	1
Japan	0	0	0	1	3	0	0	0	0	4	9	1
WP: Ryan Rowland-Smith (1-0) LP: Daisuke Miura (0-1) Sv: Jeff Williams (1S); Home runs: AUS: D. Nilsson in 8th, 1 RBI; JPN: K. Fukudome in 5th, 3 RBIs

Team	1	2	3	4	5	6	7	8	9	R	H	E
Canada	0	0	0	0	0	0	0	0	1	1	5	1
Japan	2	1	1	3	1	0	0	1	x	9	11	0
WP: Tsuyoshi Wada (1-0) LP: Mike Johnson (1-1); Home runs: CAN: None; JPN: Y. Takahashi in 1st, 2 RBIs; Y. Tani in 2nd, 1 RBI; K. Wada in 4th, 2 RBIs

Team	1	2	3	4	5	6	7	8	9	R	H	E
Chinese Taipei	0	0	3	0	0	0	0	0	0	3	10	1
Japan	0	0	0	0	0	3	0	0	1	4	10	0
WP: Hiroki Kuroda (2-0) LP: Tsao Chin-Hui (0-1-1); Home runs: TPE: Chen C. F. in 3rd, 3 RBIs; JPN: Y. Takahashi in 7th, 2 RBIs

Team	1	2	3	4	5	6	7	8	9	R	H	E
Japan	0	1	0	0	0	1	4	0	0	6	13	0
Greece	0	0	0	0	0	0	1	0	0	1	4	1
WP: Naoyuki Shimizu (1-0) LP: Meleti Ross Melehes (0-2); Home runs: JPN: K. Fukudome in 7th, 2 RBIs; Y. Takahashi in 7th, 2 RBIs; GRE: E. D. Pappas in 7th, 1 RBI

Semifinal

Team	1	2	3	4	5	6	7	8	9	R	H	E
Australia	0	0	0	0	0	1	0	0	0	1	5	2
Japan	0	0	0	0	0	0	0	0	0	0	5	0
WP: Chris Oxspring (2-0) LP: Daisuke Matsuzaka (1-1) Sv: Jeff Williams (2S)

Bronze Medal Final

Team	1	2	3	4	5	6	7	8	9	R	H	E
Japan	2	0	4	1	0	0	0	4	0	11	13	0
Canada	0	0	0	1	1	0	0	0	0	2	5	0
WP: Tsuyoshi Wada (2-0) LP: Mike Johnson (1-2); Home runs: JPN: K. Jojima in 1st, 2 RBIs; CAN: J. Ware in 5th, 1 RBI

Won Bronze Medal

== Basketball ==
=== Women's tournament ===
Roster

The following is the Japan roster in the women's basketball tournament of the 2004 Summer Olympics.

Japan women's national basketball team – 2004 Summer Olympics roster
Players
Coaches

Pos.	No.	Name	Age – Date of birth	Height	Club	Ctr.
C	4	Noriko Hamaguchi	30 – 15 January 1974	1.83 m (6 ft 0 in)	Japan Energy	(Japan)
F	5	Mari Konno	24 – 18 May 1980	1.78 m (5 ft 10 in)	Japan Energy	(Japan)
G	6	Taeko Oyama (C)	30 – 18 June 1974	1.73 m (5 ft 8 in)	Japan Energy	(Japan)
G	7	Natsumi Yabuuchi	27 – 21 July 1977	1.75 m (5 ft 9 in)	Japan Airlines Rabbits	(Japan)
F	8	Hiromi Kawabata	25 – 23 May 1979	1.80 m (5 ft 11 in)	Japan Energy	(Japan)
G	9	Kaori Kusuda	30 – 29 March 1974	1.65 m (5 ft 5 in)	Japan Energy	(Japan)
F	10	Ryoko Yano	25 – 20 December 1978	1.78 m (5 ft 10 in)	Japan Energy	(Japan)
C	11	Maki Eguchi	25 – 14 October 1978	1.84 m (6 ft 0 in)	Chanson Cosmetics	(Japan)
G	12	Masami Tachikawa	23 – 16 November 1980	1.71 m (5 ft 7 in)	Japan Energy	(Japan)
G	13	Yuko Oga	21 – 17 October 1982	1.70 m (5 ft 7 in)	Japan Energy	(Japan)
C	14	Naomi Yashiro	26 – 30 December 1977	1.82 m (6 ft 0 in)	Japan Airlines Rabbits	(Japan)
F	15	Mutsuko Nagata	27 – 26 September 1976	1.78 m (5 ft 10 in)	Chanson Cosmetics	(Japan)

Head coach

- (Japan) Tomohide Utsumi

Assistant coach(es)

- (Japan) Eiki Umezaki
- (Japan) Mikiko Hagiwara

Legend

- (C) Team captain
- nat field describes country
  of last club
  before the tournament
- Age as of August 13, 2004

Group play

Pos	Team	Pld	W	L	PF	PA	PD	Pts	Qualification
1	Australia	5	5	0	418	313	+105	10	Quarterfinals
2	Russia	5	4	1	389	333	+56	9	Quarterfinals
3	Brazil	5	3	2	430	361	+69	8	Quarterfinals
4	Greece (H)	5	2	3	353	392	−39	7	Quarterfinals
5	Japan	5	1	4	381	485	−104	6	
6	Nigeria	5	0	5	335	422	−87	5	

Source: FIBA archive
Rules for classification: 1) points; 2) head-to-head points; 3) head-to-head goal average; 4) head-to-head number of points scored.
(H) Hosts

14 August 2004
16:45

Japan	62–128	Brazil
Scoring by quarter: 22–26, 3–36, 17–33, 20–33
Pts: Hamaguchi 23; Rebs: Yano 5 Asts: Kusuda, Nagata 2		Pts: Oliveira 25; Rebs: Oliveira 13; Asts: Pinto 7

Helliniko Indoor Arena, Athens
Attendance: 950
Referees:
Giampaolo Cicoria (Italy)
Abreu Joao (Mozambique)

16 August 2004
11:15

Nigeria	73–79	Japan
Scoring by quarter: 22–22, 24–23, 16–20, 11–14
Pts: Udoka 19; Rebs: Udoka 16; Asts: Four players 1		Pts: Yano 21; Rebs: Kusuda, Yano 6 Asts: Kusuda, Hamaguchi 4

Olympic Indoor Hall, Athens
Attendance: 400
Referees:
Elizabeth Sisk (United States)
Dallas Pickering (New Zealand)

18 August 2004
11:15

Japan	78–97	Australia
Scoring by quarter: 20–26, 15–30, 10–26, 33–15
Pts: Oga 21; Rebs: Yano 4 Asts: Kawabata, Tachikawa 2		Pts: Jackson 31; Rebs: Jackson 9 Asts: Tranquilli 5

Helliniko Indoor Arena, Athens
Attendance: 500
Referees:
Alejandro Chiti (Argentina)
Song Yanping (China)

20 August 2004
9:00

Russia	94–71	Japan
Scoring by quarter: 29–21, 21–15, 24–15, 20–20
Pts: Baranova 22; Rebs: Stepanova 12; Asts: Shchegoleva 3		Pts: Hamaguchi 14; Rebs: Yabuuchi 4 Asts: Oyama, Tachikawa 2

Olympic Indoor Hall, Athens
Attendance: 185
Referees:
Abdelillah Chlif (Morocco)
Kim Ja Ok (South Korea)

22 August 2004
16:45

Greece	93–91	Japan
Scoring by quarter: 27–15, 20–26, 16–22, 30–28
Pts: Maltsi 33; Rebs: Maltsi 11; Asts: Kalentzou 3		Pts: Yano 28; Rebs: Kusuda 5 Asts: Kusuda

Helliniko Indoor Arena, Athens
Attendance: 7,223
Referees:
Chantal Julien (France)
Michael Aylen (Australia)

9th-10th Place Final

24 August 2004
11:15

9th place

Japan	63–82	China
Scoring by quarter: 12–20, 17–10, 19–21, 15–31
Pts: Kusuda, Koiso 13; Rebs: Oyama 6 Asts: Kusuda 2		Pts: Sui 25; Rebs: Wang 13; Asts: Miao 5

Helliniko Indoor Arena, Athens
Attendance: 253
Referees:
Abdellilah Chlif (Morocco)
Abreu Joao (Mozambique)

== Boxing ==
Japan sent one boxer to the 2004 Olympics.

Athlete	Event	Round of 32	Round of 16	Quarterfinals	Semifinals	Final	
Athlete	Event	Opposition Result	Opposition Result	Opposition Result	Opposition Result	Opposition Result	Rank
Toshiyuki Igarashi	Light flyweight	Kebede (ETH); L 21–26	Did not advance				

== Canoeing ==
=== Sprint ===
Athlete	Event	Heats		Semifinals		Final	
Athlete	Event	Time	Rank	Time	Rank	Time	Rank
Miyuki Shirata	Women's K-1 500 m	2:00.860	7 q	2:03.076	7	Did not advance	
Shinobu Kitamoto; Yumiko Suzuki	Women's K-2 500 m	1:44.730	4 q	1:47.614	8	Did not advance	
Miho Adachi; Shinobu Kitamoto; Yumiko Suzuki; Mikiko Takeya	Women's K-4 500 m	1:36.873	4 q	1:35.493	2 Q	1:40.188	9

Qualification Legend: Q = Qualify to final; q = Qualify to semifinal

== Cycling ==
=== Road ===
Athlete	Event	Time	Rank
Shinri Suzuki	Men's road race	Did not finish	
Yasutaka Tashiro	Men's road race	5:50:35	56
Miyoko Karami	Women's road race	3:30:30	41
Miho Oki	Women's road race	3:25:42	20

=== Track ===
Sprint

Athlete	Event	Qualification		Round 1	Repechage 1	Round 2	Repechage 2	Quarterfinals	Semifinals	Final	
Athlete	Event	Time Speed (km/h)	Rank	Opposition Time Speed (km/h)	Opposition Time Speed (km/h)	Opposition Time Speed (km/h)	Opposition Time Speed (km/h)	Opposition Time Speed (km/h)	Opposition Time Speed (km/h)	Opposition Time Speed (km/h)	Rank
Tomohiro Nagatsuka	Men's sprint	10.646; 67.631	14	Withdrew							
Toshiaki Fushimi; Masaki Inoue; Tomohiro Nagatsuka	Men's team sprint	44.355; 60.872	3 Q	Netherlands; W 44.081; 61.250	—N/a					Germany; L 44.246; 61.022	2nd place, silver medalist(s)

Time trial

Athlete	Event	Time	Rank
Sayuri Osuga	Women's time trial	35.045	10

Keirin

Athlete	Event	1st round	Repechage	2nd round	Final
Athlete	Event	Rank	Rank	Rank	Rank
Toshiaki Fushimi	Men's keirin	6 R	5	Did not advance	

Omnium

Athlete	Event	Points	Laps	Rank
Makoto Iijima	Men's points race	13	0	16

=== Mountain biking ===
Athlete	Event	Time	Rank
Kenji Takeya	Men's cross-country	LAP (1 lap)	38
Yukari Nakagome	Women's cross-country	LAP (1 lap)	22

== Diving ==
Japanese divers qualified two spots each in men's springboard and women's platform.

Men

Athlete	Event	Preliminaries		Semifinals		Final	
Athlete	Event	Points	Rank	Points	Rank	Points	Rank
Ken Terauchi	3 m springboard	456.15	4 Q	701.79	5 Q	690.00	8

Women

Athlete	Event	Preliminaries		Semifinals		Final	
Athlete	Event	Points	Rank	Points	Rank	Points	Rank
Takiri Miyazaki	10 m platform	315.78	12 Q	486.63	12 Q	479.10	11

== Equestrian ==
=== Show jumping ===
Athlete	Horse	Event	Qualification								Final					Total	
Athlete	Horse	Event	Round 1		Round 2			Round 3			Round A		Round B			Total	
Athlete	Horse	Event	Penalties	Rank	Penalties	Total	Rank	Penalties	Total	Rank	Penalties	Rank	Penalties	Total	Rank	Penalties	Rank
Tadayoshi Hayashi	Swanky	Individual	8	=47	17	25	54 Q	Retired			Did not advance						
Ryuichi Obata	Oliver Q	Individual	14	=66	Eliminated			Did not advance									
Taizo Sugitani	Lamalushi	Individual	12	=60	16	28	61 Q	9	37	=51 Q	8	=12 Q	12	20	=16	20	=16
Yuka Watanabe	Nike	Individual	3	18	3	6	=13 Q	18	24	=37 Q	17	39	Did not advance				
Tadayoshi Hayashi; Ryuichi Obata; Taizo Sugitani; Yuka Watanabe	See above	Team	—N/a								36	13	Did not advance			36	13

== Fencing ==
Five fencers, two men and three women, represented Japan in 2004.

Men

Athlete	Event	Round of 64	Round of 32	Round of 16	Quarterfinal	Semifinal	Final / BM	
Athlete	Event	Opposition Score	Opposition Score	Opposition Score	Opposition Score	Opposition Score	Opposition Score	Rank
Yuki Ota	Individual foil	Bye	Chumacero (MEX); W 15–9	Ganeyev (RUS); L 8–15	Did not advance			
Masashi Nagara	Individual sabre	Basmatzian (GRE); W 15–8	Pozdnyakov (RUS); L 9–15	Did not advance				

Women

Athlete	Event	Round of 64	Round of 32	Round of 16	Quarterfinal	Semifinal	Final / BM	
Athlete	Event	Opposition Score	Opposition Score	Opposition Score	Opposition Score	Opposition Score	Opposition Score	Rank
Megumi Harada	Individual épée	Wilson (RSA); W 15–6	Cascioli (ITA); L 14–15	Did not advance				
Chieko Sugawara	Individual foil	—N/a	Carbone (ARG); W 15–6	Trillini (ITA); L 2–15	Did not advance			
Madoka Hisagae	Individual sabre	—N/a	Nagy (HUN); W 15–14	Zagunis (USA); L 13–15	Did not advance			

== Field hockey ==
=== Women's tournament ===
Roster

The following is the Japanese roster in the women's field hockey tournament of the 2004 Summer Olympics.

Head coach: Kazunori Kobayashi

1. Rie Terazono (GK)
2. Keiko Miura (C)
3. Akemi Kato
4. Yukari Yamamoto
5. Sachimi Iwao
6. Chie Kimura
7. Rika Komazawa
8. Sakae Morimoto
9. Kaori Chiba
10. Naoko Saito
11. Tomomi Komori
12. Nami Miyazaki (GK)
13. Akiko Kitada
14. Rika Ishida
15. Emi Sakurai
16. Miyuki Nakagawa

Group play

Pos	Team	Pld	W	D	L	GF	GA	GD	Pts	Qualification
1	China	4	4	0	0	11	2	+9	12	Semi-finals
2	Argentina	4	3	0	1	12	4	+8	9	Semi-finals
3	Japan	4	2	0	2	5	7	−2	6	
4	New Zealand	4	1	0	3	3	9	−6	3	
5	Spain	4	0	0	4	3	12	−9	0	

Source: FIH
Rules for classification: 1) Points; 2) Matches won; 3) Goal difference; 4) Goals for; 5) Head-to-head result.

14 August 2004
10:30

China	3 – 0	Japan
Fu Baorong 7'; Tang Chunling 39'; Chen Qiuqi 67'	Report

Umpires:
Marelize de Klerk (RSA)
Renee Cohen (NED)

16 August 2004
08:30

Japan	1 – 3	Argentina
Komazawa 27'	Report	Arrondo 19'; García 37'; Di Giacomo 58'

Umpires:
Minka Woolley (AUS)
Lyn Farrell (NZL)

18 August 2004
20:00

Japan	2 – 0	New Zealand
Komori 18', 52'	Report

Umpires:
Carolina de la Fuente (ARG)
Gina Spitaleri (ITA)

20 August 2004
20:00

Spain	1 – 2	Japan
Termens 67'	Report	Morimoto 5'; Komazawa 34'

Umpires:
Jean Duncan (GBR)
Ute Conen (GER)

5th-8th Place Semifinal

24 August 2004
11:00

Japan	1 – 3	Australia
Komori 15'	Report	Gallagher 27'; Faulkner 33'; Powell 37'

Umpires:
Sarah Garnett (NZL)
Carolina de la Fuente (ARG)

7th-8th Place Final

27 August 2004
08:30

South Korea	3 – 1	Japan
Oh Ko-Woon 12', 18'; Kim Jin-Kyoung 19'	Report	Miura 35+'

Umpires:
Carolina de la Fuente (ARG)
Julie Ashton-Lucy (AUS)

== Football ==
=== Men's tournament ===
Roster

The following is the Japanese squad in the men's football tournament of the 2004 Summer Olympics.

Head coach: Masakuni Yamamoto

No.	Pos.	Player	Date of birth (age)	Caps	Goals	2004 club
1	GK	Hitoshi Sogahata*	2 August 1979 (aged 25)	4	0	(Japan Football Association) Kashima Antlers
2	DF	Marcus Tulio Tanaka	24 April 1981 (aged 23)	0	0	(Japan Football Association) Urawa Red Diamonds
3	DF	Teruyuki Moniwa	8 September 1981 (aged 22)	3	0	(Japan Football Association) FC Tokyo
4	DF	Daisuke Nasu	10 October 1981 (aged 22)	0	0	(Japan Football Association) Yokohama F. Marinos
5	MF	Yuki Abe	6 September 1981 (aged 22)	0	0	(Japan Football Association) JEF United Ichihara
6	MF	Yasuyuki Konno	25 January 1983 (aged 21)	0	0	(Japan Football Association) FC Tokyo
7	MF	Kōji Morisaki	9 May 1981 (aged 23)	0	0	(Japan Football Association) Sanfrecce Hiroshima
8	MF	Shinji Ono*	27 September 1979 (aged 24)	42	4	(Royal Dutch Football Association) Feyenoord
9	FW	Daiki Takamatsu	8 September 1981 (aged 22)	0	0	(Japan Football Association) Oita Trinita
10	MF	Daisuke Matsui	11 May 1981 (aged 23)	1	0	(Japan Football Association) Kyoto Purple Sanga
11	FW	Tatsuya Tanaka	27 November 1982 (aged 21)	0	0	(Japan Football Association) Urawa Red Diamonds
12	DF	Naoya Kikuchi	24 November 1984 (aged 19)	0	0	(Japan Football Association) Júbilo Iwata
13	MF	Yūichi Komano	25 June 1981 (aged 23)	0	0	(Japan Football Association) Sanfrecce Hiroshima
14	MF	Naohiro Ishikawa	12 May 1981 (aged 23)	2	0	(Japan Football Association) FC Tokyo
15	DF	Yūhei Tokunaga	25 September 1983 (aged 20)	0	0	(Japan Football Association) Waseda University
16	FW	Yoshito Ōkubo	9 June 1982 (aged 22)	15	0	(Japan Football Association) Cerezo Osaka
17	FW	Sōta Hirayama	6 June 1985 (aged 19)	0	0	(Japan Football Association) University of Tsukuba
18	GK	Takaya Kurokawa	7 April 1981 (aged 23)	0	0	(Japan Football Association) Shimizu S-Pulse

* Over-aged player.

Group play

Pos	Team	Pld	W	D	L	GF	GA	GD	Pts	Qualification
1	Paraguay	3	2	0	1	6	5	+1	6	Qualified for the quarterfinals
2	Italy	3	1	1	1	5	5	0	4	Qualified for the quarterfinals
3	Ghana	3	1	1	1	4	4	0	4	
4	Japan	3	1	0	2	6	7	−1	3	

12 August 2004
20:30

Paraguay	4 – 3	Japan
Giménez 5'; Cardozo 26', 37'; Torres 62'	Report	Ono 22' (pen.), 53' (pen.); Ōkubo 81'

Kaftanzoglio Stadium, Thessaloniki
Attendance: 5,381
Referee: Essam Abd El Fatah (Egypt)

15 August 2004
20:30

Japan	2 – 3	Italy
Abe 21'; Takamatsu 90+1'	Report	De Rossi 3'; Gilardino 8', 36'

Panthessaliko Stadium, Volos
Attendance: 9,487
Referee: Jorge Larrionda (Uruguay)

18 August 2004
20:30

Japan	1 – 0	Ghana
Ōkubo 37'	Report

Panthessaliko Stadium, Volos
Attendance: 6,813
Referee: Kyros Vassaras (Greece)

=== Women's tournament ===
Roster

Head coach: Eiji Ueda

Japan named a squad of 18 players and 4 alternates for the tournament.

No.	Pos.	Player	Date of birth (age)	Caps	Goals	Club
1	GK	Nozomi Yamago	16 January 1975 (aged 29)	58	0	(Japan Football Association) Saitama Reinas
2	DF	Kyoko Yano	3 June 1984 (aged 20)	7	1	(Japan Football Association) Kanagawa University
3	DF	Hiromi Isozaki (captain)	22 December 1975 (aged 28)	52	4	(Japan Football Association) Tasaki Perule
4	DF	Yumi Obe	15 February 1975 (aged 29)	78	7	(Japan Football Association) YKK AP Tohoku Flappers
5	DF	Naoko Kawakami	16 November 1977 (aged 26)	31	0	(Japan Football Association) Tasaki Perule
6	MF	Tomoe Sakai	27 May 1978 (aged 26)	54	2	(Japan Football Association) NTV Beleza
7	MF	Emi Yamamoto	9 March 1982 (aged 22)	11	0	(Japan Football Association) Tasaki Perule
8	MF	Tomomi Miyamoto	31 December 1978 (aged 25)	48	9	(Japan Football Association) Kunoichi
9	FW	Eriko Arakawa	30 October 1979 (aged 24)	12	5	(Japan Football Association) NTV Beleza
10	FW	Homare Sawa	6 September 1978 (aged 25)	79	48	(Japan Football Association) NTV Beleza
11	FW	Mio Otani	5 May 1979 (aged 25)	37	23	(Japan Football Association) Tasaki Perule
12	DF	Yasuyo Yamagishi	28 November 1979 (aged 24)	45	6	(Japan Football Association) Kunoichi
13	DF	Aya Shimokozuru	7 June 1982 (aged 22)	0	0	(Japan Football Association) Speranza
14	FW	Karina Maruyama	26 March 1983 (aged 21)	16	6	(Japan Football Association) Nippon Sport Science University
15	MF	Miyuki Yanagita	11 April 1981 (aged 23)	25	3	(Japan Football Association) Tasaki Perule
16	MF	Yayoi Kobayashi	18 September 1981 (aged 22)	43	11	(Japan Football Association) NTV Beleza
17	MF	Kozue Ando	9 July 1982 (aged 22)	0	0	(Japan Football Association) Saitama Reinas
18	GK	Shiho Onodera	18 November 1973 (aged 30)	43	11	(Japan Football Association) NTV Beleza

Group play

Pos	Team	Pld	W	D	L	GF	GA	GD	Pts	Qualification
1	Sweden	2	1	0	1	2	2	0	3	Qualified for the quarterfinals
2	Nigeria	2	1	0	1	2	2	0	3	Qualified for the quarterfinals
3	Japan	2	1	0	1	1	1	0	3	Qualified for the quarterfinals

August 11, 2004
18:00

Sweden	0 – 1	Japan
	Report	Arakawa 24'

Panthessaliko Stadium, Volos
Attendance: 10.104
Referee: Gaye (Senegal)

August 14, 2004
18:00

Japan	0 – 1	Nigeria
	Report	Okolo 55'

Karaiskakis Stadium, Piraeus
Attendance: 14.126
Referee: Ferreira-James (Guyana)

Quarterfinal

August 20, 2004
18:00

United States	2 – 1	Japan
Lilly 43'; Wambach 59'	Report	Yamamoto 48'

Kaftanzoglio Stadium, Thessaloniki
Attendance: 1.418
Referee: de Oliveira (Brazil)

== Gymnastics ==
=== Artistic ===
Men
Team

Athlete	Event	Qualification								Final							
Athlete	Event	Apparatus						Total	Rank	Apparatus						Total	Rank
Athlete	Event	F	PH	R	V	PB	HB	Total	Rank	F	PH	R	V	PB	HB	Total	Rank
Takehiro Kashima	Team	9.150	9.812 Q	—N/a	9.625	9.475	9.737	—N/a		—N/a	9.750	—N/a	9.600	9.737	9.825	—N/a	
Hisashi Mizutori	Team	—N/a	9.450	9.650	9.500	—N/a	9.737	—N/a		—N/a		9.625	—N/a				
Daisuke Nakano	Team	9.725 Q	—N/a	9.012	—N/a	9.800 Q	9.775 Q	—N/a		9.412	—N/a						
Hiroyuki Tomita	Team	8.987	9.750 Q	9.750 Q	9.650	9.787 Q	9.725	57.649	3 Q	—N/a	9.675	9.787	9.687	9.700	9.850	—N/a	
Naoya Tsukahara	Team	9.725	9.687	9.700	9.425	9.650	—N/a			9.312	9.650	9.712	—N/a	9.575	—N/a		
Isao Yoneda	Team	9.725 Q	8.450	9.625	9.637	9.687	9.800 Q	56.924	10 Q	9.587	—N/a		9.550	—N/a	9.787	—N/a	
Total	Team	38.325	38.699	38.725	38.412	38.924	39.049	232.134	1 Q	28.311	29.075	29.124	28.837	29.012	29.462	173.821	1st place, gold medalist(s)

Individual finals

Athlete	Event	Apparatus						Total	Rank
Athlete	Event	F	PH	R	V	PB	HB	Total	Rank
Takehiro Kashima	Pommel horse	—N/a	9.787	—N/a				9.787	3rd place, bronze medalist(s)
Daisuke Nakano	Floor	9.712	—N/a					9.712	6
Daisuke Nakano	Parallel bars	—N/a				9.762	—N/a	9.762	5
Daisuke Nakano	Horizontal bar	—N/a					8.750	8.750	9
Hiroyuki Tomita	All-around	9.062	9.737	9.762	9.625	9.637	9.662	57.485	6
Hiroyuki Tomita	Pommel horse	—N/a	9.062	—N/a				9.062	8
Hiroyuki Tomita	Rings	—N/a		9.800	—N/a			9.800	4
Hiroyuki Tomita	Parallel bars	—N/a				9.775	—N/a	9.775	2nd place, silver medalist(s)
Isao Yoneda	All-around	9.650	9.575	9.337	9.700	9.612	9.025	56.899	10
Isao Yoneda	Floor	9.662	—N/a					9.662	7
Isao Yoneda	Horizontal bar	—N/a					9.787	9.787	3rd place, bronze medalist(s)

Women

Athlete	Event	Qualification						Final					
Athlete	Event	Apparatus				Total	Rank	Apparatus				Total	Rank
Athlete	Event	V	UB	BB	F	Total	Rank	V	UB	BB	F	Total	Rank
Manami Ishizaka	All-around	9.125	9.187	8.637	9.262	36.211	33	Did not advance					
Kyoko Oshima	All-around	8.662	9.362	8.437	8.500	34.961	51	Did not advance					

=== Rhythmic ===
Athlete	Event	Qualification						Final					
Athlete	Event	Hoop	Ball	Clubs	Ribbon	Total	Rank	Hoop	Ball	Clubs	Ribbon	Total	Rank
Yukari Murata	Individual	21.775	22.425	22.400	21.550	88.150	18	Did not advance					

=== Trampoline ===
Athlete	Event	Qualification		Final	
Athlete	Event	Score	Rank	Score	Rank
Haruka Hirota	Women's	63.00	7 Q	37.20	7

== Judo ==
Fourteen Japanese judoka (seven males and five females) qualified for the 2004 Summer Olympics.

Men

Athlete	Event	Preliminary	Round of 32	Round of 16	Quarterfinals	Semifinals	Repechage 1	Repechage 2	Repechage 3	Final / BM	
Athlete	Event	Opposition Result	Opposition Result	Opposition Result	Opposition Result	Opposition Result	Opposition Result	Opposition Result	Opposition Result	Opposition Result	Rank
Tadahiro Nomura	−60 kg	Bye	Lara (DOM); W 1120–0000	Gussenberg (GER); W 1000–0000	Albarracín (ARG); W 1000–0000	Tsagaanbaatar (MGL); W 1000–0000	Bye			Khergiani (GEO); W 0100–0001	1st place, gold medalist(s)
Masato Uchishiba	−66 kg	—N/a	Lencina (ARG); W 1011–0000	Dashdavaa (MGL); W 1001–0000	Dzhafarov (RUS); W 1001–0000	Georgiev (BUL); W 1000–0000	Bye			Krnáč (SVK); W 1000–0000	1st place, gold medalist(s)
Masahiro Takamatsu	−73 kg	Bye	Kevkhishvili (GEO); L 0010–0101	Did not advance							
Masahiko Tomouchi	−81 kg	—N/a	Nossov (RUS); L 0001–0201	Did not advance			Meloni (ITA); L 0001–0102	Did not advance			
Hiroshi Izumi	−90 kg	—N/a	Kukharenka (BLR); W 1000–0000	Iliadis (GRE); W 1010–0010	Costa (ARG); W 0001–0000	Hwang (KOR); W 0101–0001	Bye			Zviadauri (GEO); L 0000–1001	2nd place, silver medalist(s)
Kosei Inoue	−100 kg	Mekić (BIH); W 1010–0000	Kovács (HUN); W 0002–0001	Kelly (AUS); W 1000–0000	van der Geest (NED); L 0010–1020	Did not advance	Bye	Miraliyev (AZE); L 0000–1011	Did not advance		
Keiji Suzuki	+100 kg	Bye	Tölzer (GER); W 0120–0010	Papaioannou (GRE); W 1101–0001	Rybak (BLR); W 1011-0100	Bianchessi (ITA); W 1010–0001	Bye			Tmenov (RUS); W 1000–0000	1st place, gold medalist(s)

Women

Athlete	Event	Round of 32	Round of 16	Quarterfinals	Semifinals	Repechage 1	Repechage 2	Repechage 3	Final / BM	
Athlete	Event	Opposition Result	Opposition Result	Opposition Result	Opposition Result	Opposition Result	Opposition Result	Opposition Result	Opposition Result	Rank
Ryoko Tani	−48 kg	Bye	Karagiannopoulou (GRE); W 0220–0001	Haddad (ALG); W 1011–0001	Dumitru (ROU); W 0211–0001	Bye			Jossinet (FRA); W 0112–0001	1st place, gold medalist(s)
Yuki Yokosawa	−52 kg	Ri S-S (PRK); W 1000–0000	Diédhiou (SEN); W 0101–0100	Singleton (GBR); W 1001–0000	Savón (CUB); W 1000–0000	Bye			Xian Dm (CHN); L 0000–1000	2nd place, silver medalist(s)
Kie Kusakabe	−57 kg	Fleming (VEN); W 1000–0000	Erdenet-Od (MGL); W 0020–0002	Bönisch (GER); L 0000–0200	Did not advance	Bye	Fernández (ESP); L 0001–0010	Did not advance		
Ayumi Tanimoto	−63 kg	Dhahri (TUN); W 1000–0000	Maza (ECU); W 1000–0000	Chisholm (CAN); W 1000–0000	Krukower (ARG); W WO	Bye			Heill (AUT); W 0200–0000	1st place, gold medalist(s)
Masae Ueno	−70 kg	Schutz (USA); W 1000–0001	Sraka (SVK); W 0012–0001	Jacques (BEL); W 1000–0000	Arlove (AUS); W 1002–0000	Bye			Bosch (NED); W 1000–0001	1st place, gold medalist(s)
Noriko Anno	−78 kg	Bye	Pinto (VEN); W 1011–0000	Morico (ITA); W 0101–0001	Lebrun (FRA); W 0010–0000	Bye			Liu X (CHN); W 1010–0001	1st place, gold medalist(s)
Maki Tsukada	+78 kg	Bye	Malone (AUS); W 1000–0000	Prokofyeva (UKR); W 1012–0100	Donguzashvili (RUS); W 0210–0000	Bye			Beltrán (CUB); W 1000–0100	1st place, gold medalist(s)

== Rowing ==
The Japanese rowers qualified the following boats:

Men

Athlete	Event	Heats		Repechage		Semifinals		Final	
Athlete	Event	Time	Rank	Time	Rank	Time	Rank	Time	Rank
Kazushige Ura; Daisaku Takeda	Lightweight double sculls	6:24.08	4 R	6:17.26	1 SA/B	6:18.51	3 FA	6:24.98	6

Women

Athlete	Event	Heats		Repechage		Final	
Athlete	Event	Time	Rank	Time	Rank	Time	Rank
Akiko Iwamoto; Kahori Uchiyama	Lightweight double sculls	7:14.04	5 R	7:07.07	4 FC	7:37.46	13

Qualification Legend: FA=Final A (medal); FB=Final B (non-medal); FC=Final C (non-medal); FD=Final D (non-medal); FE=Final E (non-medal); FF=Final F (non-medal); SA/B=Semifinals A/B; SC/D=Semifinals C/D; SE/F=Semifinals E/F; R=Repechage

== Sailing ==
Japanese sailors have qualified one boat for each of the following events.

Men

Athlete	Event	Race											Net points	Final rank
Athlete	Event	1	2	3	4	5	6	7	8	9	10	M*	Net points	Final rank
Motokazu Kenjo	Mistral	16	23	18	23	~~OCS~~	4	12	12	15	19	28	170	19
Kazuto Seki; Kenjiro Todoroki	470	3	7	~~21~~	18	7	12	1	9	5	17	11	90	3rd place, bronze medalist(s)

Women

Athlete	Event	Race											Net points	Final rank
Athlete	Event	1	2	3	4	5	6	7	8	9	10	M*	Net points	Final rank
Masako Imai	Mistral	12	14	17	11	5	16	17	10	16	17	~~18~~	135	17
Maiko Sato	Europe	~~24~~	16	24	16	23	11	23	10	24	22	23	192	24
Mitsuko Satake; Yuka Yoshisako	470	~~DSQ~~	17	16	10	8	12	4	12	3	18	1	101	11

Open

Athlete	Event	Race																Net points	Final rank
Athlete	Event	1	2	3	4	5	6	7	8	9	10	11	12	13	14	15	M*	Net points	Final rank
Kunio Suzuki	Laser	30	22	39	~~OCS~~	29	25	30	28	22	29	—N/a					27	281	35
Kenji Nakamura; Masato Takaki	49er	12	14	~~19~~	~~OCS~~	4	2	19	4	2	14	4	7	17	18	14	15	146	15

M = Medal race; OCS = On course side of the starting line; DSQ = Disqualified; DNF = Did not finish; DNS= Did not start; RDG = Redress given

== Shooting ==
Nine Japanese shooters (three men and six women) qualified to compete in the following events:

Men

Athlete	Event	Qualification		Final	
Athlete	Event	Points	Rank	Points	Rank
Masaru Nakashige	10 m air pistol	576	=23	Did not advance	
Masaru Nakashige	50 m pistol	537	38	Did not advance	
Shuji Tazawa	10 m air pistol	573	=30	Did not advance	
Shuji Tazawa	25 m rapid fire pistol	573	15	Did not advance	
Masaru Yanagida	10 m air rifle	594	=9	Did not advance	
Masaru Yanagida	50 m rifle prone	591	=24	Did not advance	
Masaru Yanagida	50 m rifle 3 positions	1159	=16	Did not advance	

Women

Athlete	Event	Qualification		Final	
Athlete	Event	Points	Rank	Points	Rank
Michiko Fukushima	10 m air pistol	378	25	Did not advance	
Michiko Fukushima	25 m pistol	577	=13	Did not advance	
Yoko Inada	10 m air pistol	382	=10	Did not advance	
Megumi Inoue	Double trap	109	3 Q	140	5
Yukari Konishi	25 m pistol	575	=19	Did not advance	
Hiromi Misaki	10 m air rifle	392	=22	Did not advance	
Hiromi Misaki	50 m rifle 3 positions	569	24	Did not advance	
Taeko Takeba	Trap	59	8	Did not advance	

== Softball ==
In the final game of the preliminary round, Yukiko Ueno of Japan pitched the first perfect game in Olympic softball history as Japan defeated China 2-0. Two days later, Japan again defeated China in the 3rd/4th semifinal to guarantee a medal. Their loss in the bronze medal game left them with the bronze.

Team Roster

Japan
Position	No.	Player	Birth	Club in 2004
IF	3	Masumi Mishina	MAR/12/1982	Hitachi Takasaki
IF	4	Emi Naito	OCT/06/1979	Toyota Industries Corp.
IF	5	Rie Sato	AUG/14/1980	Leo Palace 21
OF	7	Yumi Iwabuchi	SEP/10/1979	Hitachi Takasaki
OF	8	Eri Yamada	MAR/08/1984	Hitachi Software
P	12	Naoko Sakamoto	MAY/11/1985	Hitachi Takasaki
P	15	Yuki Sato	NOV/03/1980	Leo Palace 21
P	17	Yukiko Ueno	JUL/22/1982	Hitachi Takasaki
P	18	Juri Takayama	OCT/21/1976	Toyota Industries Corp.
IF	19	Kazue Ito	DEC/22/1977	Hitachi Takasaki
P	21	Hiroko Sakai	NOV/03/1978	Toda Chūō General Hospital
C	23	Emi Inui	OCT/26/1983	Hitachi Takasaki
C	25	Noriko Yamaji	SEP/17/1970	Taiyo Yuden
OF	26	Haruka Saito	MAR/14/1970	Hitachi Software
IF	28	Reika Utsugi	JUN/01/1963	Hitachi Takasaki
Bench Coaches
Team; Manager	30	Taeko Utsugi	APR/06/1953
Coach		Mitsufumi Urano	JAN/25/1953
Coach		Yoshimi Kobayashi	AUG/11/1968

Preliminary Round

Team	Pld	W	L	RF	RA	Pct
United States	7	7	0	41	0	1.000
Australia	7	6	1	22	14	0.857
Japan	7	4	3	17	8	0.571
China	7	3	4	15	20	0.429
Canada	7	3	4	6	14	0.429
Chinese Taipei	7	2	5	3	13	0.286
Greece	7	2	5	6	24	0.286
Italy	7	1	6	8	24	0.143

Team	1	2	3	4	5	6	7	R	H	E
Australia	0	1	0	2	1	0	0	4	7	0
Japan	2	0	0	0	0	0	0	2	0	2
WP: Tanya Harding (1-0) LP: Yukiko Ueno (0-1); Home runs: AUS: N.Titcume in 4th, 1 RBI; JPN: None

Team	1	2	3	4	5	6	7	R	H	E
Chinese Taipei	0	0	0	0	0	0	0	0	2	4
Japan	1	4	0	0	1	0	X	6	13	0
WP: Hiroko Sakai (1-0) LP: Lin Su-Hua (0-1)

Team	1	2	3	4	5	6	7	8	R	H	E
United States	0	0	0	0	0	0	0	3	3	3	0
Japan	0	0	0	0	0	0	0	0	0	1	3
WP: Cat Osterman (1-0) LP: Juri Takayama (0-1)

Team	1	2	3	4	5	6	7	8	R	H	E
Canada	0	0	0	0	0	0	0	1	1	1	2
Japan	0	0	0	0	0	0	0	0	0	3	1
WP: Lauren Bay (2-1) LP: Yukiko Ueno (0-2)

Team	1	2	3	4	5	6	7	R	H	E
Japan	0	3	1	0	0	0	2	6	12	1
Greece	0	0	0	0	0	0	0	0	2	3
WP: Hiroko Sakai (2-0) LP: Sarah Farnworth (2-3)

Team	1	2	3	4	5	6	7	R	H	E
Italy	0	0	0	0	0	0	0	0	3	0
Japan	0	0	1	0	0	0	X	1	8	1
WP: Yukiko Ueno (1-2) LP: Jennifer Spediacci (1-2)

Team	1	2	3	4	5	6	7	R	H	E
China	0	0	0	0	0	0	0	0	0	0
Japan	0	0	1	0	1	1	X	2	8	0
WP: Yukiko Ueno (2-2) LP: Lu Wei (2-2)

Semifinal

Team	1	2	3	4	5	6	7	8	R	H	E
Japan	0	0	0	0	0	0	0	1	1	6	0
China	0	0	1	0	0	0	0	0	0	3	4
WP: Yukiko Ueno (3-2) LP: Lu Wei (2-3)

Bronze Medal Game

Team	1	2	3	4	5	6	7	R	H	E
Australia	0	0	0	0	3	0	0	3	4	0
Japan	0	0	1	0	0	0	0	0	3	1
WP: Tanya Harding (4-0) LP: Juri Takayama (1-2)

Won Bronze Medal

== Swimming ==
Japanese swimmers earned qualifying standards in the following events (up to a maximum of 2 swimmers in each event at the A-standard time, and 1 at the B-standard time):

Men

Athlete	Event	Heat		Semifinal		Final	
Athlete	Event	Time	Rank	Time	Rank	Time	Rank
Genki Imamura	200 m breaststroke	2:14.10	11 Q	2:12.86	11	Did not advance	
Kosuke Kitajima	100 m breaststroke	1:00.03 OR	1 Q	1:00.01 OR	1 Q	1:00.08	1st place, gold medalist(s)
Kosuke Kitajima	200 m breaststroke	2:11.97	2 Q	2:10.86	3 Q	2:09.44 OR	1st place, gold medalist(s)
Takeshi Matsuda	400 m freestyle	3:49.05 AS	8 Q	—N/a		3:48.96 AS	8
Takeshi Matsuda	1500 m freestyle	15:16.42	13	—N/a		Did not advance	
Takeshi Matsuda	200 m butterfly	1:58.23	12 Q	1:58.13	14	Did not advance	
Jiro Miki	200 m individual medley	2:00.93	4 Q	2:01.09	8 Q	2:02.16	8
Jiro Miki	400 m individual medley	4:16.32	4 Q	—N/a		4:19.97	7
Takahiro Mori	200 m individual medley	2:01.33	9 Q	2:00.57	7 Q	2:00.60	6
Tomomi Morita	100 m backstroke	54.41	1 Q	54.62	3 Q	54.36 AS	3rd place, bronze medalist(s)
Tomomi Morita	200 m backstroke	2:01.19	16 Q	1:59.52	8 Q	1:58.40 AS	5
Yoshihiro Okumura	100 m freestyle	50.24	27	Did not advance			
Yoshihiro Okumura	200 m freestyle	1:49.54	13 Q	1:49.49	10	Did not advance	
Susumu Tabuchi	400 m individual medley	4:22.46	18	—N/a		Did not advance	
Takashi Yamamoto	100 m butterfly	52.71	10 Q	52.81	9	Did not advance	
Takashi Yamamoto	200 m Butterfly	1:57.36	2 Q	1:56.69	4 Q	1:54.56 AS	2nd place, silver medalist(s)
Kosuke Kitajima; Tomomi Morita; Yoshihiro Okumura; Takashi Yamamoto	4 × 100 m medley relay	3:37.04	4 Q	—N/a		3:35.22	3rd place, bronze medalist(s)

Women

Athlete	Event	Heat		Semifinal		Final	
Athlete	Event	Result	Rank	Result	Rank	Result	Rank
Misa Amano	200 m individual medley	2:17.88	17	Did not advance			
Misa Amano	400 m individual medley	4:45.61	10	—N/a		Did not advance	
Noriko Inada	100 m backstroke	1:01.67	5 Q	1:01.74	11	Did not advance	
Tomoko Nagai	100 m freestyle	55.76	12 Q	56.03	16	Did not advance	
Tomoko Nagai	200 m freestyle	2:00.73	13 Q	2:00.09	13	Did not advance	
Reiko Nakamura	100 m backstroke	1:01.39	2 Q	1:01.24	8 Q	1:01.05	4
Reiko Nakamura	200 m backstroke	2:11.14	2 Q	2:10.14	3 Q	2:09.88	3rd place, bronze medalist(s)
Yuko Nakanishi	100 m butterfly	1:00.16	17 Q	59.53	14	Did not advance	
Yuko Nakanishi	200 m butterfly	2:10.04	2 Q	2:08.83	2 Q	2:08.04	3rd place, bronze medalist(s)
Junko Onishi	100 m butterfly	59.22	7 Q	59.24	8 Q	59.83	8
Yukiko Osada	200 m butterfly	2:11.20	8 Q	2:11.35	13	Did not advance	
Ai Shibata	400 m freestyle	4:07.63	4 Q	—N/a		4:07.51	5
Ai Shibata	800 m freestyle	8:30.08	3 Q	—N/a		8:24.54	1st place, gold medalist(s)
Masami Tanaka	100 m breaststroke	1:09.44	10 Q	1:09.11	9	Did not advance	
Masami Tanaka	200 m breaststroke	2:26.91	5 Q	2:26.38	2 Q	2:25.87	4
Aya Terakawa	200 m backstroke	2:13.55	10 Q	2:12.21	7 Q	2:12.90	8
Sachiko Yamada	400 m freestyle	4:09.10	8 Q	—N/a		4:10.91	6
Sachiko Yamada	800 m freestyle	8:36.48	12	—N/a		Did not advance	
Noriko Inada*; Tomoko Nagai; Reiko Nakamura; Junko Onishi; Masami Tanaka	4 × 100 m medley relay	4:05.99	6 Q	—N/a		4:04.83	5

== Synchronized swimming ==
Nine Japanese synchronized swimmers qualified a spot in the women's team.

Athlete	Event	Technical routine		Free routine (preliminary)			Free routine (final)		
Athlete	Event	Points	Rank	Points	Total (technical + free)	Rank	Points	Total (technical + free)	Rank
Miya Tachibana; Miho Takeda	Duet	49.000	2	49.000	98.000	2 Q	49.417	98.417	2nd place, silver medalist(s)
Michiyo Fujimaru; Saho Harada; Naoko Kawashima; Kanako Kitao; Emiko Suzuki; Miya Tachibana; Miho Takeda; Juri Tatsumi; Yoko Yoneda	Team	49.167	2	—N/a			49.334	98.501	2nd place, silver medalist(s)

== Table tennis ==
Eight Japanese table tennis players (five men and three women) qualified for the following events.

Men

Athlete	Event	Round 1	Round 2	Round 3	Round 4	Quarterfinals	Semifinals	Final / BM	
Athlete	Event	Opposition Result	Opposition Result	Opposition Result	Opposition Result	Opposition Result	Opposition Result	Opposition Result	Rank
Shu Arai	Singles	Liu S (ARG); L 1–4	Did not advance						
Koji Matsushita	Singles	Brown (AUS); W 4–0	Heister (NED); W 4–0	Ryu S-M (KOR); L 0–4	Did not advance				
Ryo Yuzawa	Singles	Lin J (DOM); L 1–4	Did not advance						
Shu Arai; Ryo Yuzawa	Doubles	—N/a	Boudjadja / Djaziri (ALG); W 4–0	Boll / Fejer-Konnerth (GER); L 0–4	Did not advance				
Akira Kito; Toshio Tasaki	Doubles	—N/a	Bye	Gionis / Kreanga (GRE); W 4–3	Grujić / Karakašević (SCG); L 1–4	Did not advance			

Women

Athlete	Event	Round 1	Round 2	Round 3	Round 4	Quarterfinals	Semifinals	Final / BM	
Athlete	Event	Opposition Result	Opposition Result	Opposition Result	Opposition Result	Opposition Result	Opposition Result	Opposition Result	Rank
Ai Fujinuma	Singles	Bye	Wu X (DOM); W 4–0	Liu J (AUT); W 4–3	Zhang Xl (SIN); L 2–4	Did not advance			
Ai Fukuhara	Singles	Bye	Miao (AUS); W 4-3	Gao (USA); W 4–0	Kim K-A (KOR); L 1–4	Did not advance			
Aya Umemura	Singles	Bye		Schöpp (GER); W 4–2	Li Jw (SIN); L 2–4	Did not advance			
Ai Fujinuma; Aya Umemura	Doubles	Bye			Lau S F / Lin L (HKG); W 4–2	Guo Y / Niu Jf (CHN); L 2–4	Did not advance		

== Taekwondo ==
Japan has qualified one taekwondo jin.

Athlete	Event	Round of 16	Quarterfinals	Semifinals	Repechage 1	Repechage 2	Final / BM	
Athlete	Event	Opposition Result	Opposition Result	Opposition Result	Opposition Result	Opposition Result	Opposition Result	Rank
Yoriko Okamoto	Women's +67 kg	Chen Z (CHN); L 5–7	Did not advance		Carmona (VEN); L 2–5	Did not advance		

== Tennis ==
Athlete	Event	Round of 64	Round of 32	Round of 16	Quarterfinals	Semifinals	Final / BM	
Athlete	Event	Opposition Score	Opposition Score	Opposition Score	Opposition Score	Opposition Score	Opposition Score	Rank
Shinobu Asagoe	Women's singles	Schiavone (ITA); L 3–6, 6–7^{(4–7)}	Did not advance					
Akiko Morigami	Women's singles	Benešová (CZE); W 6–1, 6–4	Kuznetsova (RUS); L 6–7^{(5–7)}, 2–6	Did not advance				
Saori Obata	Women's singles	Matevžič (SLO); L 6–7^{(3–7)}, 5–7	Did not advance					
Ai Sugiyama	Women's singles	Zheng J (CHN); W 4–6, 6–3, 8–6	Perebiynis (UKR); W 7–5, 6–4	Šprem (CRO); W 7–6^{(8–6)}, 6–1	Molik (AUS); L 3–6, 4–6	Did not advance		
Shinobu Asagoe; Ai Sugiyama	Women's doubles	—N/a	Dementieva / Myskina (RUS); W 5–7, 7–5, 6–3	Kostanić / Šprem (CRO); W 6–3, 7–5	Navratilova / Raymond (USA); W 6–4, 4–6, 6–4	Martínez / Ruano Pascual (ESP); L 3–6, 0–6	Suárez / Tarabini (ARG); L 3–6, 3–6	4
Akiko Morigami; Saori Obata	Women's doubles	—N/a	Czink / Kapros (HUN); W 3–6, 7–5, 6–3	Suárez / Tarabini (ARG); L 4–6, 2–6	Did not advance			

== Triathlon ==
Five Japanese triathletes qualified for the following events.

Athlete	Event	Swim (1.5 km)	Trans 1	Bike (40 km)	Trans 2	Run (10 km)	Total Time	Rank
Hiroyuki Nishiuchi	Men's	18:20	0:18	1:05:34	0:19	33:49	1:57:43.51	32
Hirokatsu Tayama	Men's	18:03	0:17	1:01:43	0:17	33:42	1:53:28.41	13
Machiko Nakanishi	Women's	19:40	0:18	1:10:45	0:23	38:26	2:08:51.06	20
Kiyomi Niwata	Women's	20:35	0:22	1:09:54	0:23	37:13	2:07:42.79	14
Akiko Sekine	Women's	20:37	0:20	1:09:49	0:23	37:08	2:07:34.02	12

== Volleyball ==
=== Beach ===
Athlete	Event	Preliminary round	Standing	Round of 16	Quarterfinals	Semifinals	Final	
Athlete	Event	Opposition Score	Standing	Opposition Score	Opposition Score	Opposition Score	Opposition Score	Rank
Chiaki Kusuhara; Ryoko Tokuno	Women's	Pool A May – Walsh (USA); L 0 – 2 (9–21, 16–21); Celbová – Nováková (CZE); L 0 – 2 (21–23, 12–21); Kadijk – Leenstra (NED); W 2 – 1 (15–21, 21–17, 15–13)	3	Did not advance				

=== Indoor ===
==== Women's tournament ====
Roster

The following is the Japanese roster in the women's volleyball tournament of the 2004 Summer Olympics.

Head coach: Shoichi Yanagimoto

No.	Name	Date of birth	Height	Weight	Spike	Block	2004 club
1	Tomoko Yoshihara (c)	2 April 1970	1.80 m (5 ft 11 in)	63 kg (139 lb)	305 cm (120 in)	295 cm (116 in)	(Japan) Pioneer Red Wings
2	Chie Tsuji	9 August 1969	1.77 m (5 ft 10 in)	68 kg (150 lb)	298 cm (117 in)	285 cm (112 in)	(Japan) Mobara Alcas
3	Ikumi Narita (L)	1 January 1976	1.73 m (5 ft 8 in)	67 kg (148 lb)	299 cm (118 in)	276 cm (109 in)	(Japan) Hisamitsu Springs
4	Miki Sasaki	15 December 1976	1.82 m (6 ft 0 in)	76 kg (168 lb)	317 cm (125 in)	307 cm (121 in)	(Japan) Pioneer Red Wings
5	Kanako Omura	15 December 1976	1.84 m (6 ft 0 in)	69 kg (152 lb)	319 cm (126 in)	290 cm (110 in)	(Japan) Hisamitsu Springs
7	Yoshie Takeshita	18 March 1978	1.59 m (5 ft 3 in)	55 kg (121 lb)	280 cm (110 in)	270 cm (110 in)	(Japan) JT Marvelous
9	Miyuki Takahashi	25 December 1978	1.70 m (5 ft 7 in)	68 kg (150 lb)	285 cm (112 in)	280 cm (110 in)	(Japan) NEC Red Rockets
12	Sachiko Sugiyama	19 October 1979	1.84 m (6 ft 0 in)	69 kg (152 lb)	310 cm (120 in)	305 cm (120 in)	(Japan) NEC Red Rockets
13	Ai Otomo	24 March 1982	1.83 m (6 ft 0 in)	71 kg (157 lb)	312 cm (123 in)	305 cm (120 in)	(Japan) NEC Red Rockets
14	Kana Oyama	19 June 1984	1.87 m (6 ft 2 in)	82 kg (181 lb)	308 cm (121 in)	287 cm (113 in)	(Japan) Toray Arrows
16	Megumi Kurihara	31 July 1984	1.88 m (6 ft 2 in)	68 kg (150 lb)	305 cm (120 in)	285 cm (112 in)	(Japan) NEC Red Rockets
18	Saori Kimura	19 August 1986	1.82 m (6 ft 0 in)	66 kg (146 lb)	298 cm (117 in)	293 cm (115 in)	(Japan) Shimokitazawa Seitoku

Group play

Pos	Team	Pld	W	L	Pts	SW	SL	SR	SPW	SPL	SPR	Qualification
1	Brazil	5	5	0	10	15	2	7.500	410	326	1.258	Quarterfinals
2	Italy	5	4	1	9	14	3	4.667	392	305	1.285	Quarterfinals
3	South Korea	5	3	2	8	9	7	1.286	355	352	1.009	Quarterfinals
4	Japan	5	2	3	7	6	10	0.600	346	343	1.009	Quarterfinals
5	Greece	5	1	4	6	5	12	0.417	349	383	0.911	
6	Kenya	5	0	5	5	0	15	0.000	236	379	0.623	

Source: FIVB

14 August 2004; 14:00	Japan	0–3	Brazil	Peace and Friendship Stadium; Referees: Frank Leuthaeusser (GER), Patrick Richard (FRA)
14 August 2004; 14:00	(21–25, 22–25, 21–25) result			Peace and Friendship Stadium; Referees: Frank Leuthaeusser (GER), Patrick Richard (FRA)

16 August 2004; 14:00	Italy	3–0	Japan	Peace and Friendship Stadium; Referees: Mahmoud Abdel Nagid (EGY), Fernando Nava (Mex)
16 August 2004; 14:00	(25–16, 25–13, 25–17) result			Peace and Friendship Stadium; Referees: Mahmoud Abdel Nagid (EGY), Fernando Nava (Mex)

18 August 2004; 16:35	Japan	3–1	Greece	Peace and Friendship Stadium; Referees: Francisco Medina Guzmán (CUB), Valdir Dellaqua (BRA)
18 August 2004; 16:35	(25–10, 20–25, 25–21, 25–22) result			Peace and Friendship Stadium; Referees: Francisco Medina Guzmán (CUB), Valdir Dellaqua (BRA)

20 August 2004; 14:00	South Korea	3–0	Japan	Peace and Friendship Stadium; Referees: Frank Leuthaeusser (GER), Patrick Richard (FRA)
20 August 2004; 14:00	(25–21, 26–24, 25–21) result			Peace and Friendship Stadium; Referees: Frank Leuthaeusser (GER), Patrick Richard (FRA)

22 August 2004; 11:00	Japan	3–0	Kenya	Peace and Friendship Stadium; Referees: Georgios Karampetsos (GRE), Umit Sokullu (TUR)
22 August 2004; 11:00	(25–8, 25–17, 25–14) result			Peace and Friendship Stadium; Referees: Georgios Karampetsos (GRE), Umit Sokullu (TUR)

Quarterfinal

24 August 2004; 14:00	China	3–0	Japan	Peace and Friendship Stadium; Referees: Abdullah Al Khelaifi (EGY, Georgios Karampetsos (GRE)
24 August 2004; 14:00	(20–25, 22–25, 20–25) result			Peace and Friendship Stadium; Referees: Abdullah Al Khelaifi (EGY, Georgios Karampetsos (GRE)

== Weightlifting ==
Four Japanese weightlifters qualified for the following events:

Athlete	Event	Snatch		Clean & Jerk		Total	Rank
Athlete	Event	Result	Rank	Result	Rank	Total	Rank
Masaharu Yamada	Men's −56 kg	~~102.5~~	DNF	—	—	—	DNF
Toshio Imamura	Men's −62 kg	120	=12	150	=12	270	11
Takanobu Iwazaki	Men's +105 kg	170	14	215	12	385	12
Hiromi Miyake	Women's −48 kg	77.5	=9	97.5	8	175	9

== Wrestling ==
Key:

- VT – Victory by Fall.
- PP – Decision by Points – the loser with technical points.
- PO – Decision by Points – the loser without technical points.

Men's freestyle

Athlete	Event	Elimination Pool				Quarterfinal	Semifinal	Final / BM	
Athlete	Event	Opposition Result	Opposition Result	Opposition Result	Rank	Opposition Result	Opposition Result	Opposition Result	Rank
Chikara Tanabe	−55 kg	Abdullayev (AZE); W 3–1 ^{PP}	Dutt (IND); W 3–1 ^{PP}	—N/a	1 Q	Kim H-S (KOR); W 4–0 ^{ST}	Abas (USA); L 0–3 ^{PO}	Kardanov (GRE); W 3–0 ^{PO}	3rd place, bronze medalist(s)
Kenji Inoue	−60 kg	Zakhartdinov (UZB); L 1–3 ^{PP}	Jung Y-H (KOR); W 3–1 ^{PP}	Cikel (AUT); W 4–0 ^{ST}	1 Q	Bye	Mostafa-Jokar (IRI); L 1–3 ^{PP}	Fedoryshyn (UKR); W 3–1 ^{PP}	3rd place, bronze medalist(s)
Kazuhiko Ikematsu	−66 kg	Jessey (NGR); W 5–0 ^{VT}	Baek J-K (KOR); W 3–1 ^{PP}	—N/a	1 Q	Spiridonov (KAZ); L 1–3 ^{PP}	Did not advance	Taskoudis (GRE); W 3–1 ^{PP}	5
Kunihiko Obata	−74 kg	Maan (IND); W 3–0 ^{PO}	Fundora (CUB); L 0–3 ^{PO}	—N/a	2	Did not advance			12
Hidekazu Yokoyama	−84 kg	Khodaei (IRI); L 1–3 ^{PP}	Kumar (IND); W 3–1 ^{PP}	—N/a	2	Did not advance			10

Men's Greco-Roman

Athlete	Event	Elimination Pool				Quarterfinal	Semifinal	Final / BM	
Athlete	Event	Opposition Result	Opposition Result	Opposition Result	Rank	Opposition Result	Opposition Result	Opposition Result	Rank
Masatoshi Toyota	−55 kg	Majoros (HUN); L 1–3 ^{PP}	Ramírez (DOM); W 4–0 ^{ST}	—N/a	2	Did not advance			10
Makoto Sasamoto	−60 kg	Guzman (PER); W 4–0 ^{ST}	Štefanek (SCG); W 3–1 ^{PP}	—N/a	1 Q	Nazaryan (BUL); L 1–3 ^{PP}	Did not advance	Koizhaiganov (KAZ); W 3–0 ^{PO}	5
Katsuhiko Nagata	−74 kg	Kobonov (KGZ); L 1–3 ^{PP}	Yli-Hannuksela (FIN); L 0–3 ^{PO}	—N/a	3	Did not advance			16
Shingo Matsumoto	−84 kg	Abrahamian (SWE); L 0–3 ^{PO}	Kenjeev (KGZ); W 3–1 ^{PP}	Bátky (SVK); W 3–1 ^{PP}	2	Did not advance			7

Women's freestyle

Athlete	Event	Elimination Pool			Classification	Semifinal	Final / BM	
Athlete	Event	Opposition Result	Opposition Result	Rank	Opposition Result	Opposition Result	Opposition Result	Rank
Chiharu Icho	−48 kg	Belisle (CAN); W 4–0 ^{ST}	Wagner (GER); W 5–0 ^{VT}	1 Q	Bye	Berthenet (FRA); W 4–1 ^{SP}	Merleni (UKR); L 1–3 ^{PP}	2nd place, silver medalist(s)
Saori Yoshida	−55 kg	Sun Dm (CHN); W 4–0 ^{ST}	Giampiccolo (ITA); W 4–0 ^{ST}	1 Q	Bye	Gomis (FRA); W 3–1 ^{PP}	Verbeek (CAN); W 3–0 ^{PO}	1st place, gold medalist(s)
Kaori Icho	−63 kg	Holovchenko (UKR); W 4–0 ^{ST}	Kartashova (RUS); W 3–1 ^{PP}	1 Q	Bye	Legrand (FRA); W 3–0 ^{PO}	McMann (USA); W 3–1 ^{PP}	1st place, gold medalist(s)
Kyoko Hamaguchi	−72 kg	Montgomery (USA); W 3–1 ^{PP}	Zlateva (BUL); W 4–0 ^{ST}	1 Q	Bye	Wang X (CHN); L 1–3 ^{PP}	Saenko (UKR); W 3–0 ^{PO}	3rd place, bronze medalist(s)

== See also ==
- Japan at the 2002 Asian Games
- Japan at the 2004 Summer Paralympics
