= Yves Platel =

Swiss swimmer (born 1977)

Personal information
- Full name: Yves Platel
- National team: Switzerland
- Born: 7 December 1977 (age 48) Lausanne, Switzerland
- Height: 1.84 m (6 ft 0 in)
- Weight: 77 kg (170 lb)

Sport
- Sport: Swimming
- Strokes: Freestyle, medley
- Club: Genève Natation 1885
- Coach: Dirk Reinicke

Yves Platel (born December 7, 1977) is a Swiss former swimmer, who specialized in freestyle and individual medley events. He is a two-time Olympian (2000 and 2004), and currently holds four Swiss records in long-distance freestyle (800 and 1500 m) and the 400 m individual medley. Platel is a member of Genève Natation 1885 in Geneva, and is coached and trained by Dirk Reinecke.

Platel made his first Swiss team at the 2000 Summer Olympics in Sydney. There, he failed to advance into the succeeding round in any of his individual events, finishing twenty-eighth in the 200 m individual medley (2:05.19), and eighteenth in the 400 m individual medley (4:22.38).

In 2001, Platel posted a lifetime best and a short-course Swiss record of 4:11.70 to pull off a sixth-place effort in the 400 m individual medley at the European Short Course Swimming Championships in Antwerp, Belgium.

At the 2004 Summer Olympics in Athens, shortened his program by qualifying only for the 400 m individual medley. He cleared a FINA B-standard entry time of 4:23.16 from the World Championships in Barcelona, Spain. He challenged seven other swimmers on the second heat, including Olympic veteran Kim Bang-hyun of South Korea. He edged Latvia's Guntars Deičmans to take a sixth spot by 0.23 of a second in 4:28.94. Platel failed to advance into the final, as he placed twenty-ninth overall on the first day of preliminaries.
