= Naoko Sakamoto =

Naoko Sakamoto may refer to:

- Naoko Sakamoto (runner) (born 1980), Japanese long-distance runner
- Naoko Sakamoto (softball) (born 1985), Japanese softball player
