= Swimming at the 2004 Summer Olympics – Men's 400 metre individual medley =

Men's 400 metre individual medley at the Games of the XXVIII Olympiad
- Venue: Olympic Aquatic Centre
- Date: August 14, 2004 (heats & final)
- Competitors: 36 from 26 nations
- Winning time: 4:08.26 WR

Medalists
1st place, gold medalist(s)		Michael Phelps	United States
2nd place, silver medalist(s)		Erik Vendt	United States
3rd place, bronze medalist(s)		László Cseh	Hungary

The men's 400 metre individual medley event at the 2004 Olympic Games was contested at the Olympic Aquatic Centre of the Athens Olympic Sports Complex in Athens, Greece on August 14.

U.S. swimmer Michael Phelps broke a new world record of 4:08.26 to claim his first ever Olympic gold medal. Phelps' teammate Erik Vendt added a second silver to the one he earned behind Tom Dolan in Sydney four years earlier, finishing with a time of 4:11.81. Hungary's László Cseh, silver medalist at the 2003 FINA World Championships, held on for bronze in 4:12.15.

== Records ==
Prior to this competition, the existing world and Olympic records were as follows.

World record	Michael Phelps (USA)	4:08.41	Long Beach, United States	7 July 2004
Olympic record	Tom Dolan (USA)	4:11.76	Sydney, Australia	17 September 2000

The following new world and Olympic records were set during this competition.

Date	Event	Name	Nationality	Time	Record
August 14	Final	Michael Phelps	United States	4:08.26	WR

== Results ==
=== Heats ===
Rank	Heat	Lane	Name	Nationality	Time	Notes
1	5	4	Michael Phelps	United States	4:13.29	Q
2	4	4	László Cseh	Hungary	4:14.26	Q
3	3	4	Alessio Boggiatto	Italy	4:15.78	Q
4	3	5	Jiro Miki	Japan	4:16.32	Q
5	3	7	Ioannis Kokkodis	Greece	4:16.56	Q
6	4	3	Oussama Mellouli	Tunisia	4:16.68	Q
6	5	5	Erik Vendt	United States	4:16.68	Q
8	5	6	Travis Nederpelt	Australia	4:16.77	Q
9	4	2	Ioannis Drymonakos	Greece	4:16.83	
10	4	5	Luca Marin	Italy	4:16.85	
11	5	3	Justin Norris	Australia	4:16.90	
12	4	7	Robin Francis	Great Britain	4:18.34	
13	2	2	Dean Kent	New Zealand	4:18.55	
14	3	6	Wu Peng	China	4:19.32	
15	5	2	Brian Johns	Canada	4:21.10	
16	5	7	Keith Beavers	Canada	4:21.47	
17	3	2	Thiago Pereira	Brazil	4:22.06	
18	3	3	Susumu Tabuchi	Japan	4:22.46	
19	3	1	Lucas Salatta	Brazil	4:23.01	
20	2	1	Kim Bang-hyun	South Korea	4:23.05	NR
21	5	1	Igor Berezutskiy	Russia	4:23.20	
22	2	4	Jeremy Knowles	Bahamas	4:23.29	
23	4	6	Adrian Turner	Great Britain	4:23.53	
24	5	8	Alexey Kovrigin	Russia	4:23.77	
25	2	6	Bradley Ally	Barbados	4:24.70	
26	4	1	Dmytro Nazarenko	Ukraine	4:26.15	
27	2	7	Vytautas Janušaitis	Lithuania	4:26.30	
28	4	8	Liu Weijia	China	4:27.02	
29	2	5	Yves Platel	Switzerland	4:28.94	
30	2	8	Guntars Deičmans	Latvia	4:29.17	
31	3	8	Marko Milenkovič	Slovenia	4:30.99	
32	1	4	Saša Imprić	Croatia	4:32.02	
33	1	5	Andrew Mackay	Cayman Islands	4:32.38	
34	2	3	Miguel Molina	Philippines	4:33.25	
35	1	6	Lin Yu-an	Chinese Taipei	4:41.76	
36	1	3	Nikita Polyakov	Uzbekistan	5:09.66	

=== Final ===
Rank	Lane	Name	Nationality	Time	Notes
1st place, gold medalist(s)	4	Michael Phelps	United States	4:08.26	WR
2nd place, silver medalist(s)	1	Erik Vendt	United States	4:11.81	
3rd place, bronze medalist(s)	5	László Cseh	Hungary	4:12.15	
4	3	Alessio Boggiatto	Italy	4:12.28	
5	7	Oussama Mellouli	Tunisia	4:14.49	AF
6	2	Ioannis Kokkodis	Greece	4:18.60	
7	6	Jiro Miki	Japan	4:19.97	
8	8	Travis Nederpelt	Australia	4:20.08	
