= Lin Yu-an =

Taiwanese swimmer (born 1988)

Lin Yu-an OLY
Personal information
- Full name: Lin Yu-an
- National team: Chinese Taipei
- Born: 22 September 1988 (age 37) Taipei, Taiwan
- Height: 1.68 m (5 ft 6 in)
- Weight: 57 kg (126 lb)

Sport
- Sport: Swimming
- Strokes: Individual medley

Lin Yu-an (Chinese: 林昱安; pinyin: Lín Yù'ān; born September 22, 1988) is a Taiwanese swimmer, who specialized in individual medley events. Lin qualified for the men's 400 m individual medley at the 2004 Summer Olympics in Athens, by clearing a FINA B-cut of 4:33.10 from the National University Games in Taipei. He participated in the first heat against three other swimmers Saša Imprić of Croatia, Andrew Mackay of the Cayman Islands, and Nikita Polyakov of Uzbekistan. He raced to third place by a 9.74-second margin behind Impric in 4:41.76. Lin failed to advance into the top 8 final, as he placed thirty-fifth overall on the first day of preliminaries.
