= Alexey Kovrigin =

Russian swimmer (born 1981)

Personal information
- Full name: Aleksey Sergeyevich Kovrigin
- National team: Russia
- Born: 7 July 1981 (age 45) Krasnoyarsk, Russian SFSR, Soviet Union
- Height: 1.85 m (6 ft 1 in)
- Weight: 70 kg (154 lb)

Sport
- Sport: Swimming
- Strokes: Freestyle, medley
- Club: SDYuShO Krasnoyarsk
- Coach: Irina Rodina

Aleksey Sergeyevich Kovrigin (also Alexey Kovrigin, Russian: Алексей Серге́евич Ковригин; born 7 July 1981) is a Russian former swimmer, who specialized in freestyle and individual medley events. He is a three-time Russian swimming (2000, 2001, and 2004) in the 400 m individual medley, and a current president of the Krasnoyarsk Swimming Federation. He is also a graduate of physical education at Krasnoyarsk State Pedagogical University.

Kovrigin made his first Russian team, at the 2000 Summer Olympics in Sydney. There, he failed to advance into the final in any of his individual events, finishing seventeenth in the 400 m individual medley (4:22.21), and twenty-second in the 1500 m freestyle (15:30.69).

At the 2004 Summer Olympics in Athens, Kovrigin shortened his program by qualifying only for the men's 400 m individual medley. He placed second behind his teammate Igor Berezutskiy from the Russian Championships in Moscow, clearing a FINA A-standard entry time of 4:20.07. He challenged seven other swimmers on the final heat of five, including top medal favorite Michael Phelps of the United States. He rounded out the field to last place by 0.57 of a second behind Berezutskiy in 4:23.77. Kovrigin failed to advance into the final, as he placed twenty-fourth overall on the first day of preliminaries.
