= Gymnastics at the 2004 Summer Olympics – Men's floor =

Men's floor at the Games of the XXVIII Olympiad

Medalists
1st place, gold medalist(s)		Kyle Shewfelt	Canada
2nd place, silver medalist(s)		Marian Drăgulescu	Romania
3rd place, bronze medalist(s)		Yordan Yovchev	Bulgaria

These are the results of the men's floor exercise competition, one of eight events for male competitors of the artistic gymnastics discipline contested in the gymnastics at the 2004 Summer Olympics in Athens. The qualification and final rounds took place on August 14 and August 22 at the Olympic Indoor Hall.

== Results ==
=== Qualification ===
Seventy-seven gymnasts competed in the floor exercise event in the artistic gymnastics qualification round on August 14. The eight highest scoring gymnasts advanced to the final on August 22.

=== Final ===
Rank	Gymnast	Start Value	China	Latvia	Portugal	North Korea	Hungary	Israel	Penalty	Total
Gold medal	Kyle Shewfelt (CAN)	10.00	9.85	9.80	9.75	9.80	9.80	9.75	—	9.787
Silver medal	Marian Drăgulescu (ROU)	10.00	9.70	9.80	9.85	9.75	9.80	9.80	—	9.787
Bronze medal	Yordan Yovchev (BUL)	10.00	9.80	9.80	9.70	9.85	9.70	9.75	—	9.775
4	Gervasio Deferr (ESP)	10.00	9.80	9.70	9.80	9.65	9.70	9.65	—	9.712
5	Paul Hamm (USA)	10.00	9.70	9.80	9.70	9.65	9.70	9.75	—	9.712
6	Daisuke Nakano (JPN)	10.00	9.70	9.75	9.70	9.70	9.75	9.55	—	9.712
7	Isao Yoneda (JPN)	10.00	9.65	9.70	9.65	9.75	9.65	9.65	—	9.662
8	Morgan Hamm (USA)	10.00	9.70	9.80	9.75	9.75	9.75	9.75	0.10	9.650

Preceded by Gymnastics at the 2000 Summer Olympics – Men's floor	Men's Floor Event; 2004	Succeeded by Gymnastics at the 2008 Summer Olympics – Men's floor
