= Gymnastics at the 2004 Summer Olympics – Men's parallel bars =

Olympic gymnastics event

Men's parallel bars at the Games of the XXVIII Olympiad
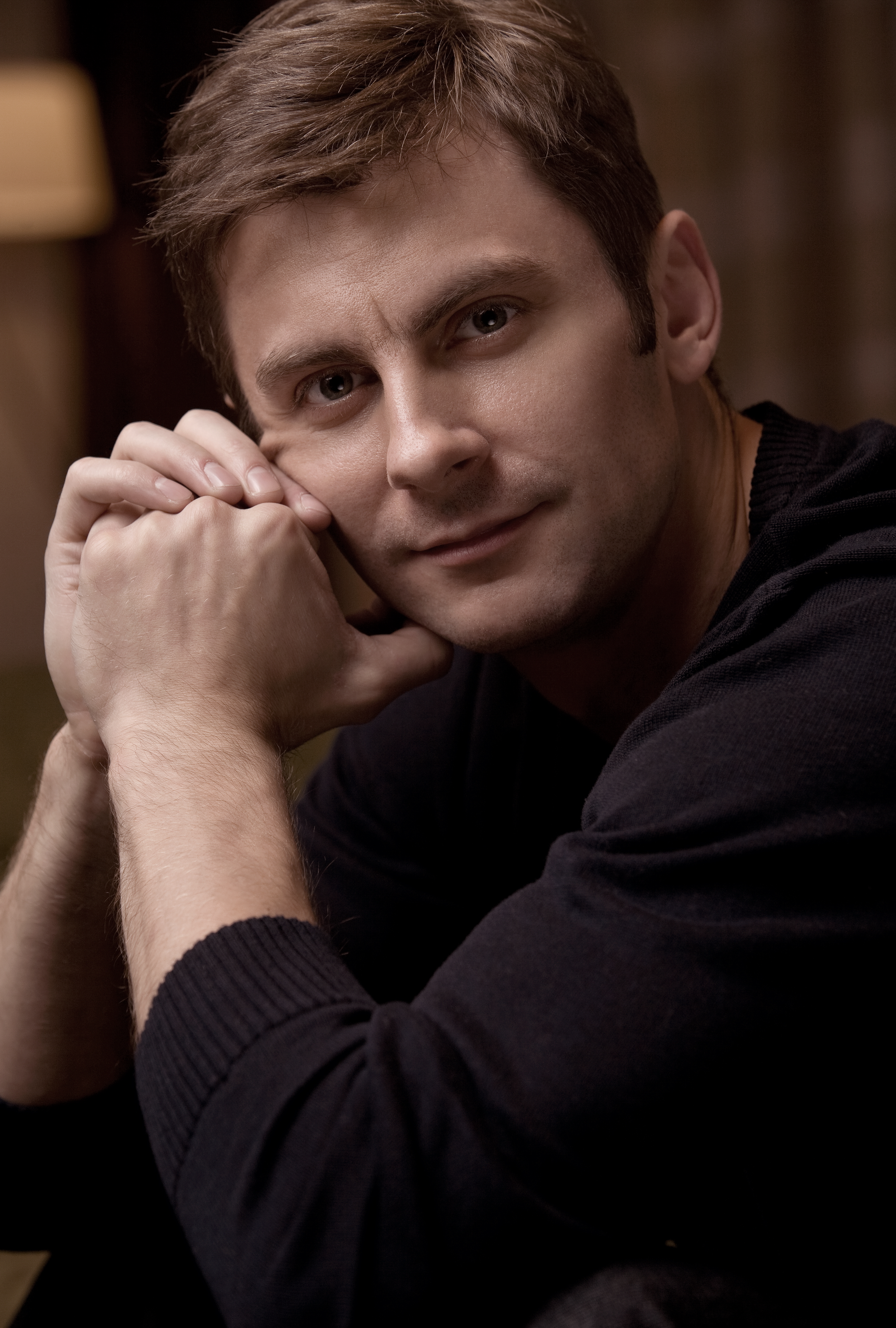
- Valeriy Honcharov (2008)
- Venue: Olympic Indoor Hall
- Dates: 14 August 2004 (qualifying); 23 August 2004 (final)
- Competitors: 81 from 30 nations
- Winning score: 9.787

Medalists
1st place, gold medalist(s)		Valeriy Honcharov; Ukraine
2nd place, silver medalist(s)		Hiroyuki Tomita; Japan
3rd place, bronze medalist(s)		Li Xiaopeng; China

The men's parallel bars competition was one of eight events for male competitors of the artistic gymnastics discipline contested in the gymnastics at the 2004 Summer Olympics in Athens. The qualification and final rounds took place on August 14 and August 23 at the Olympic Indoor Hall. There were 81 competitors from 31 nations, with nations competing in the team event having up to 5 gymnasts and other nations having up to 2 gymnasts. The event was won by Valeriy Honcharov of Ukraine, the nation's second victory in the parallel bars. Hiroyuki Tomita took silver, putting Japan above the Soviet Union on the all-time medal table for the event (both nations had four golds, the Soviet Union had led Japan 5–4 in silvers, and Japan had more bronzes 6–1). Li Xiaopeng of China became the seventh man to win multiple parallel bars medals with his bronze adding to his 2000 gold.

== Background ==
This was the 21st appearance of the event, which is one of the five apparatus events held every time there were apparatus events at the Summer Olympics (no apparatus events were held in 1900, 1908, 1912, or 1920). Six of the eight finalists from 2000 returned: gold medalist Li Xiaopeng of China, bronze medalist Alexei Nemov of Russia, fifth-place finisher Ivan Ivankov of Belarus, sixth-place finisher Yann Cucherat of France, seventh-place finisher Huang Xu of China, and eighth-place finisher Marius Urzică of Romania. Li had won the last two world champions in 2002 and 2003 and was the favorite to win Olympic gold again. American Sean Townsend had won the world championship in 2001, but was not competing in Athens.

Colombia, Malaysia, and Tunisia each made their debut in the men's parallel bars. The United States made its 19th appearance, most of any nation; the Americans had missed only the inaugural 1896 event and the boycotted 1980 Games.

== Competition format ==
The 1996 gymnastics competition had introduced the "7–6–5" format, in which each team had 7 members, designated 6 for each apparatus, and had 5 count for team scores. In 2000, this was reduced across the board to a "6–5–4" format; the 2004 competition kept this format. Further, while in 1996 all 7 team members could compete on each apparatus for individual purposes, in 2000 and 2004 only the 5 designated for that apparatus competed. The 2000 competition had also eliminated the compulsory exercises; only voluntary exercises were done on each apparatus. The qualifying round scores were used for qualification for the team all-around, individual all-around, and apparatus finals.

The top eight gymnasts, with a limit of two per nation, advanced to the final. Non-finalists were ranked 9th through 81st based on preliminary score. The preliminary score had no effect on the final; once the eight finalists were selected, their ranking depended only on the final exercise.

== Schedule ==
All times are Greece Standard Time (UTC+2)

Date	Time	Round
Saturday, 14 August 2004		Qualifying
Sunday, 23 August 2004		Final

== Results ==
=== Qualification ===
Eighty-one gymnasts competed in the parallel bars event in the artistic gymnastics qualification round on August 14. The eight highest scoring gymnasts advanced to the final on August 23.

=== Final ===
Rank	Gymnast	Nation	Start Value	Canada	Brazil	Georgia	Cuba	Bulgaria	Romania	Penalty	Total
1st place, gold medalist(s)	Valeri Goncharov	Ukraine	10.00	9.80	9.75	9.80	~~9.70~~	9.80	~~9.85~~	—	9.787
2nd place, silver medalist(s)	Hiroyuki Tomita	Japan	10.00	~~9.80~~	~~9.75~~	9.75	9.80	9.75	9.80	—	9.775
3rd place, bronze medalist(s)	Li Xiaopeng	China	10.00	~~9.80~~	9.80	9.70	9.80	9.75	~~9.65~~	—	9.762
4	Ivan Ivankov	Belarus	10.00	~~9.75~~	~~9.85~~	9.80	9.75	9.75	9.75	—	9.762
5	Daisuke Nakano	Japan	10.00	~~9.80~~	~~9.75~~	9.75	9.80	9.75	9.75	—	9.762
6	Yann Cucherat	France	10.00	~~9.75~~	~~9.80~~	9.80	9.75	9.75	9.75	—	9.762
7	Paul Hamm	United States	10.00	~~9.85~~	9.80	~~9.70~~	9.70	9.70	9.75	—	9.737
8	Yernar Yerimbetov	Kazakhstan	10.00	~~9.55~~	9.70	~~9.80~~	9.70	9.80	9.75	—	9.737
