= Nikita Polyakov =

Uzbekistani swimmer (born 1986)

Nikita Polyakov OLY
Personal information
- Full name: Nikita Polyakov
- National team: Uzbekistan
- Born: 16 May 1986 (age 40) Tashkent, Uzbek SSR, Soviet Union
- Height: 1.88 m (6 ft 2 in)
- Weight: 78 kg (172 lb)

Sport
- Sport: Swimming
- Strokes: Individual medley

Nikita Polyakov (Uzbek: Никита Поляков; born May 16, 1986) is an Uzbek former swimmer, who specialized in individual medley events. Polyakov qualified for the men's 400 m individual medley at the 2004 Summer Olympics in Athens, by clearing a FINA B-cut of 4:33.02 from the Russian Championships in Moscow. He participated in the first heat against three other swimmers Saša Imprić of Croatia, Andrew Mackay of the Cayman Islands, and Lin Yu-an of the Chinese Taipei. He rounded out a small field to last place and thirty-sixth overall by a 37.64-second margin behind Impric with a slowest time of 5:09.66.
