= Daisuke Nakano =

Japanese artistic gymnast

- Born: 10 October 1982 (age 43) Niigata, Japan
- Height: 1.68 m (5 ft 6 in)

Gymnastics career
- Discipline: Men's artistic gymnastics
- Country represented: Japan (2003–2005)
- Club: Kyushu Kyoritsu University
- Head coach: Tanji Horiuchi
Medal record
Men's artistic gymnastics
Representing Japan
Olympic Games
Gold medal – first place	2004 Athens	Team

Daisuke Nakano (中野 大輔, Nakano Daisuke; born 10 October 1982 in Niigata) is a retired Japanese gymnast. He helped his Japanese gymnastics team claim a gold medal in the all-around competition at the 2004 Summer Olympics in Athens.

== Career ==
Nakano started a sporting career under the influence of his sister and his parents, both of whom were former gymnasts. He attended Nippon Sport Science University in Setagaya, Tokyo, and grew as an independent gymnast. He had a natural talent for the sport, and the physical ability to try a "triple back" dismount on the parallel bars. Even though he had a good potential, Nakano could not produce a satisfied result because he committed numerous mistakes in the sport. In 1999, Nakano broke a thighbone at the Japanese national championships, almost prompting his decision to desist the sport.

Nakano was named to the Japanese gymnastics team for the 2002 Asian Games in Busan, South Korea, but he injured a left anterior cruciate ligament at the national championships which made him impossible to compete. In 2003, Nakano made his official debut at the Summer Universiade in Daegu, where he placed third as a member of the Japanese team in the team all-around competition.

Nakano qualified as part of the Japanese gymnastics team at the 2004 Summer Olympics in Athens by receiving an official place from the NHK Cup in Tokyo. On the first day of the Games, he occupied one of the top two spots in the horizontal bar (9.775) and in the parallel bars (9.800), after producing stellar performances for each in the prelim stage. In the team all-around, Nakano ended a 28-year-old drought to capture the gold medal for Japan, joining on top of the podium by Isao Yoneda, Hiroyuki Tomita, Naoya Tsukahara, Hisashi Mizutori, and Takehiro Kashima. During the competition, Nakano performed only a floor exercise in a score of 9.412 to sum up the team's total of 173.821. During the individual stages, Nakano failed to medal in any of his apparatus exercises, finishing fifth in the parallel bars (9.762), sixth in the floor (9.712), and ninth in the horizontal bar (8.750).
