= Guntars Deičmans =

Latvian swimmer (born 1983)

Personal information
- Full name: Guntars Deičmans
- National team: Latvia
- Born: 4 March 1983 (age 43) Jelgava, Latvian SSR, Soviet Union
- Height: 1.89 m (6 ft 2 in)
- Weight: 73 kg (161 lb)

Sport
- Sport: Swimming
- Strokes: Individual medley
- Club: JSPS
- Coach: Astra Ozolina

Guntars Deičmans (born 4 March 1983) is a Latvian former swimmer, who specialized in individual medley events. He is a 2004 Olympian, and a multiple-time Latvian champion and record holder in the same stroke (both 200 and 400 m).

Deicmans qualified for two swimming events at the 2004 Summer Olympics in Athens, by eclipsing FINA B-standard entry times of 2:03.77 (200 m individual medley) from the FINA World Championships in Barcelona and 4:28.44 (400 m individual medley) from the European Championships in Madrid. In the 400 m individual medley, Deicmans touched out Philippines' Miguel Molina to break a 4:30 barrier and capture a seventh spot on the second heat by four seconds, in a time of 4:29.17. In the 200 m individual medley, Deicmans challenged seven other swimmers on the fourth heat, including two-time Olympians Jeremy Knowles of the Bahamas and Ioannis Kokkodis of Greece. He cruised to fifth place by 0.39 of a second behind Barbados' Bradley Ally, breaking a Latvian record of 2:03.68. Deicmans failed to advance into the semifinals, as he placed twenty-fifth overall in the preliminaries.
