= Masami Tachikawa =

Japanese basketball player

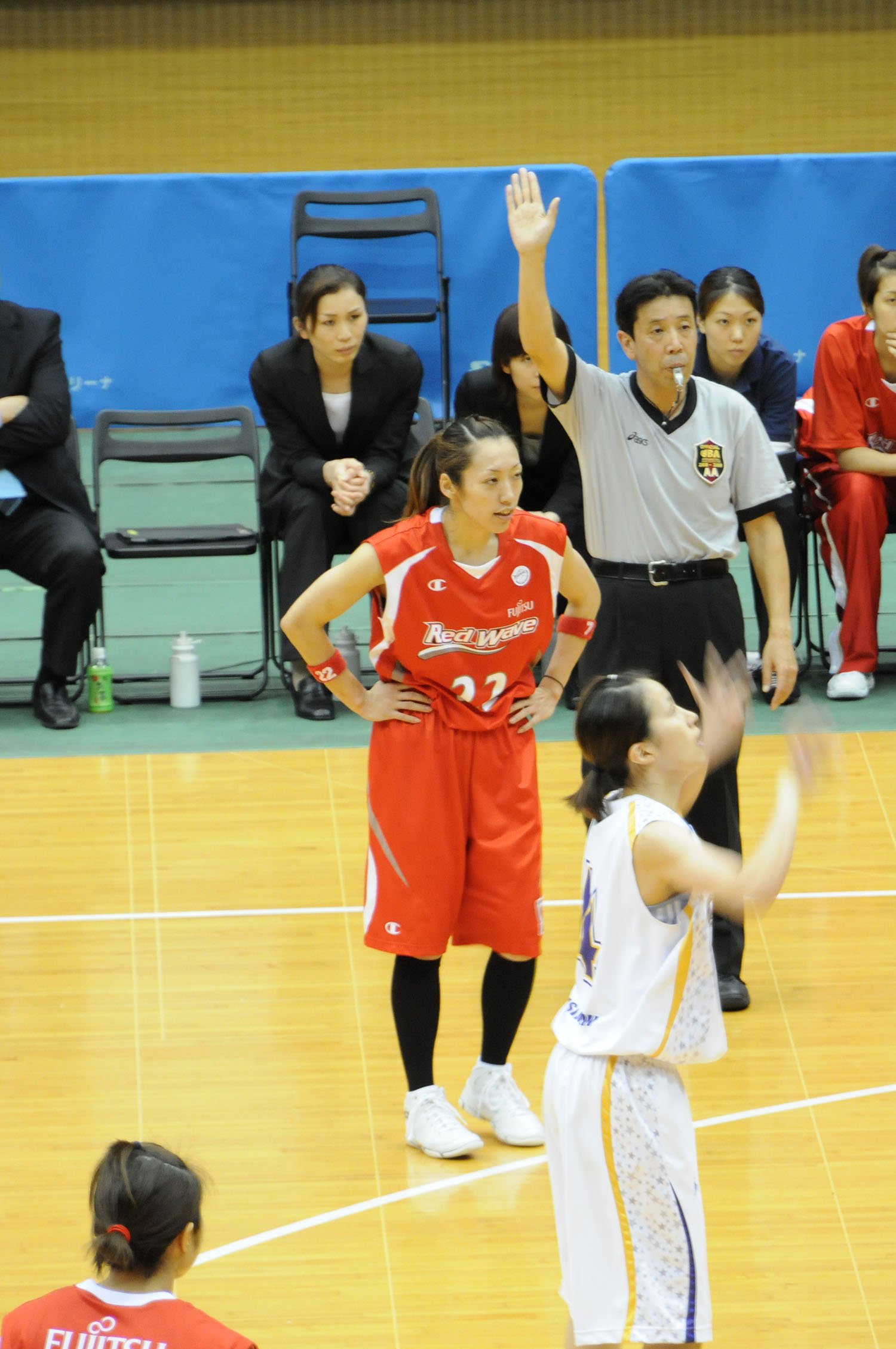
Masami Tachikawa

Masami Tachikawa (立川真紗美, born 16 November 1980) is a Japanese basketball player who competed in the 2004 Summer Olympics.
