= Ryoji Aikawa =

Japanese baseball player (born 1976)

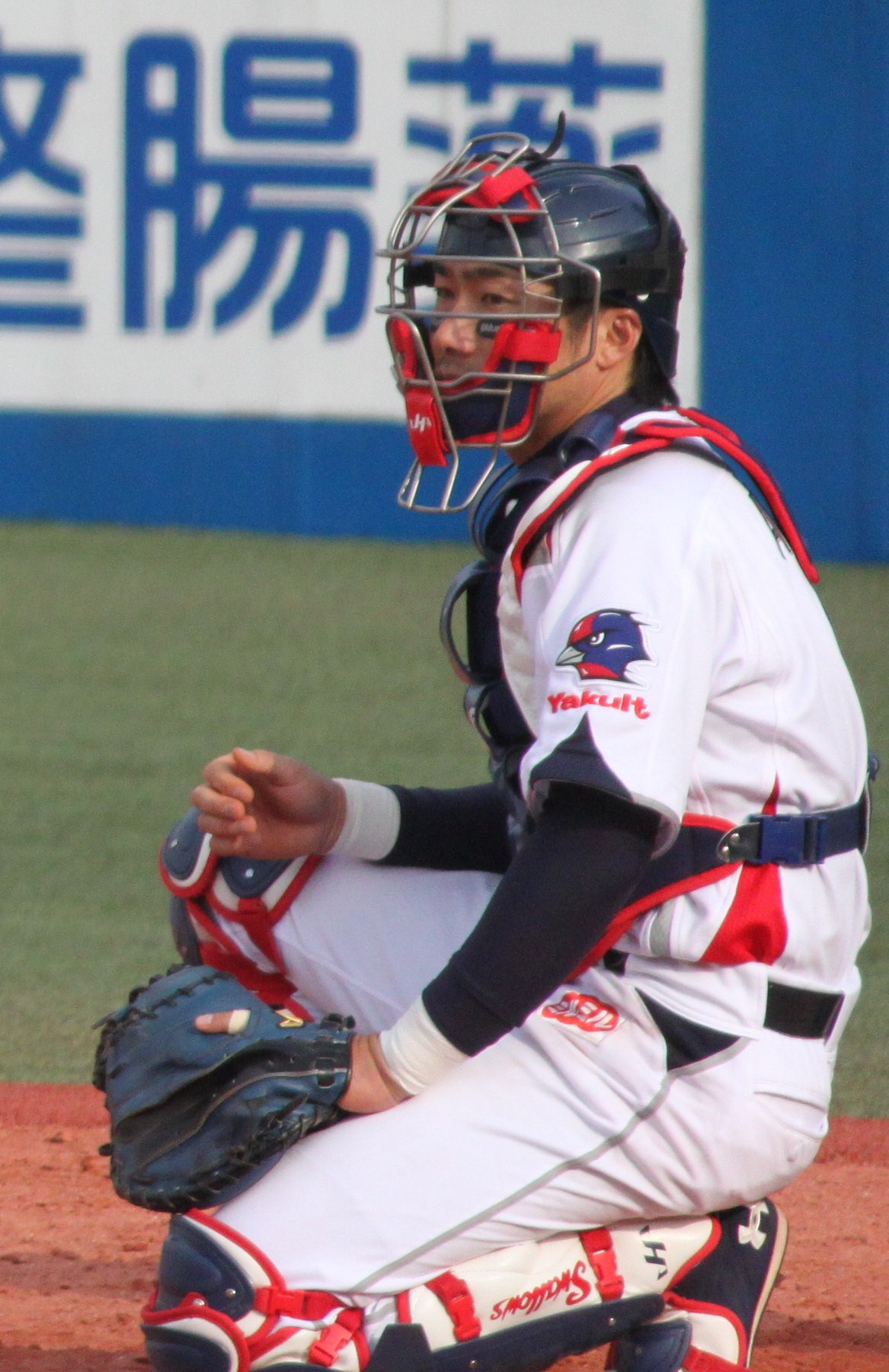
- Aikawa with the Tokyo Yakult Swallows

Yokohama DeNA BayStars – No. 81
- Catcher / Manager
- Born: July 11, 1976 (age 50); Ichikawa, Chiba, Japan
- Batted: Right Threw: Right

NPB debut
- August 21, 1999, for the Yokohama BayStars

Last NPB appearance
- October 3, 2017, for the Yomiuri Giants

NPB statistics
- Batting average: .260
- Home runs: 69
- Runs batted in: 475
- Stats at Baseball Reference

Teams
- As player: Yokohama BayStars (1995–2008); Tokyo Yakult Swallows (2009–2014); Yomiuri Giants (2015–2017); As manager: Yokohama DeNA BayStars (2026–present); As coach: Yomiuri Giants (2019–2021); Yokohama DeNA BayStars (2022–2025)
Medals
Representing Japan
Men's baseball
Olympic Games
Bronze medal – third place	2004 Athens	Team
World Baseball Classic
Gold medal – first place	2006 San Diego	Team

Ryoji Aikawa (相川 亮二, Aikawa Ryōji; born July 11, 1976) is a Japanese former professional baseball catcher who currently serves as the manager for the Yokohama DeNA BayStars of Nippon Professional Baseball (NPB). He played in NPB for the BayStars, Tokyo Yakult Swallows, and Yomiuri Giants from 1995 to 2017.

== Awards ==
Aikawa was a member of the Japanese national baseball team at the 2006 World Baseball Classic and 2013 World Baseball Classic. He also won the Bronze medal at the 2004 Olympic Games.

== Coaching career ==
On October 20, 2025, Aikawa was appointed as the manager of the Yokohama DeNA BayStars, replacing Daisuke Miura.

== Faith ==
Aikawa is a Christian. Aikawa has spoken about his faith saying, "There are always hurdles and obstacles to overcome in daily life, but knowing God is there helps me get through difficult times. I wish more Japanese people would find Jesus Christ as I have, and I am thankful I have been able to play professional baseball for such a long time."

== Family ==
His younger brother, Juri, is an actor and model.
