= Hiromi Kawabata =

Japanese basketball player

Hiromi Kawabata (川畑宏美, born 23 March 1979) is a Japanese former basketball player who competed in the 2004 Summer Olympics.
