= Naoko Sakamoto (softball) =

Japanese softball player (born 1985)

Personal information
- Born: 11 May 1985 (age 41) Osaka, Japan
- Height: 161 cm (5 ft 3 in)
- Weight: 67 kg (148 lb)
Medal record
Women's softball
Representing Japan
Olympic Games
Bronze medal – third place	2004 Athens	Team competition

Naoko Sakamoto (坂本 直子, Sakamoto Naoko; born 11 May 1985 in Osaka) is a Japanese softball player who won a bronze medal in the 2004 Summer Olympics.
